= List of King Crimson members =

Top row: McDonald, Lake, Collins, Muir, Bruford, Gunn, Rieflin Middle row: Giles, Wallace, Fripp, Belew, Harrison, Jakszyk Bottom row: Sinfield, Burrell, Wetton, Cross, Levin, Mastelotto, Stacey

King Crimson are an English progressive rock band from London. Formed in November 1968 (officially January 1969), the group originally included vocalist and bassist Greg Lake, guitarist and later keyboardist Robert Fripp, keyboardist and woodwind musician Ian McDonald, lyricist Peter Sinfield, and drummer Michael Giles. After a number of personnel changes, the group disbanded in 1974 but have since reformed on a number of occasions. As of the latest lineup change in 2020, King Crimson consisted of Fripp (the sole constant member of the band), saxophonist and flautist Mel Collins (who first joined in 1970), bassist Tony Levin (who first joined in 1981), drummers Pat Mastelotto (who first joined in 1994) and Gavin Harrison (since 2007), guitarist and vocalist Jakko Jakszyk (since 2013), and drummer and keyboardist Jeremy Stacey (since 2016).

== History ==
=== 1969–1974 ===
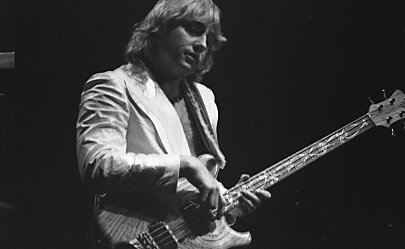
Greg Lake was the frontman on the first two King Crimson albums.

After some initial rehearsals starting in late November 1968, King Crimson were officially formed on 13 January 1969 with a lineup of Greg Lake on vocals and bass, Robert Fripp on guitar, Ian McDonald on woodwind and keyboards, Michael Giles on drums, and Peter Sinfield as the band's lyricist and operator of the band's light shows on stage (Sinfield later expanded his role to also playing synthesizer). After the recording of the band's debut album In the Court of the Crimson King, McDonald and Giles left King Crimson in January 1970 after playing their last show on 16 December 1969.

Fripp, Lake and Sinfield began recording the band's second album In the Wake of Poseidon, with the sessions also featuring Giles and his brother Peter Giles on drums and bass respectively, as well as saxophonist Mel Collins. Lake then departed to form Emerson, Lake & Palmer, while Fripp and Sinfield rebuilt the group with Collins, Gordon Haskell and Andy McCulloch in place of McDonald, Lake and Giles, respectively. After recording Lizard, both Haskell and McCulloch departed.

Ian Wallace replaced McCulloch in December 1970, and Raymond "Boz" Burrell took over from Haskell the following February. The group released Islands and returned to regular touring over the next year, Burrell, Collins and Wallace all left to join Alexis Korner's new group Snape in April 1972. Sinfield had left the group in January 1972.

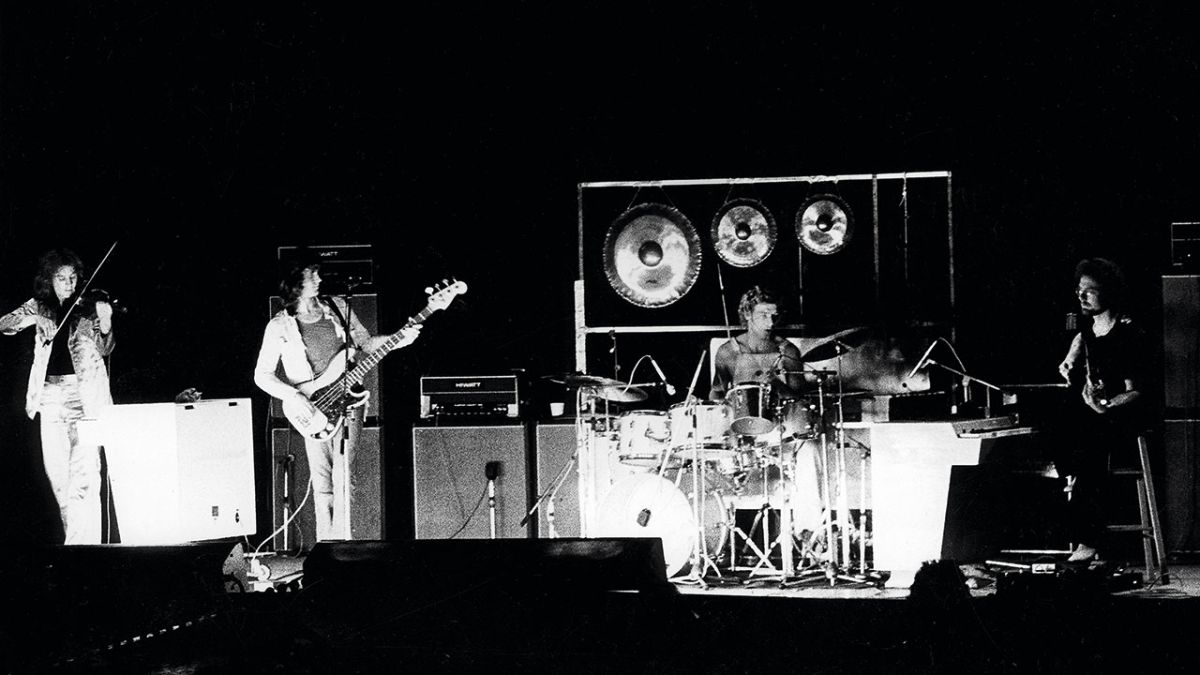
King Crimson playing in 1973

After the release of the live album Earthbound, Fripp rebuilt King Crimson again in July 1972 with the additions of former Family bassist and vocalist John Wetton, violinist and keyboardist David Cross, former Yes drummer Bill Bruford, and percussionist Jamie Muir. After the first of two live shows scheduled upon completion of the group's new album Larks' Tongues in Aspic, Muir abruptly left King Crimson to pursue Buddhism. The remaining four-piece issued Starless and Bible Black in March 1974.

By the time the group began recording the follow-up Red in July 1974, King Crimson were a trio following Cross's departure at the end of the previous tour. Later, on 25 September, Fripp announced that King Crimson had officially disbanded, claiming that the group were "completely over for ever and ever".

=== 1981–2008 ===
After several years of side projects, Fripp formed a group called Discipline in April 1981 with former King Crimson drummer Bruford, as well as vocalist and guitarist Adrian Belew, and bassist and Chapman stick player Tony Levin. By the time the band's debut album Discipline was released in October, they had adopted the King Crimson name. This lineup remained stable for three years, releasing follow-up albums Beat and Three of a Perfect Pair, before disbanding again upon the conclusion of a promotional touring cycle in July 1984.

After a ten-year break, King Crimson reformed again in 1994, with Fripp, Belew, Levin and Bruford joined by second bassist/Chapman stick player Trey Gunn and second drummer Pat Mastelotto. This lineup, dubbed the "Double Trio", began rehearsing in April 1994 and released its only studio effort THRAK the following year. After touring extensively, the group returned to the studio in May 1997 for the recording of their twelfth studio album, but faced difficulties making progress with the sessions. Instead of disbanding again, Fripp decided to initiate a process of "fraKctalisation", splitting the six band members into four "ProjeKcts" of various lineups. Each ProjeKct performed several live shows and wrote together, serving as "research and development" units for the full King Crimson incarnation.

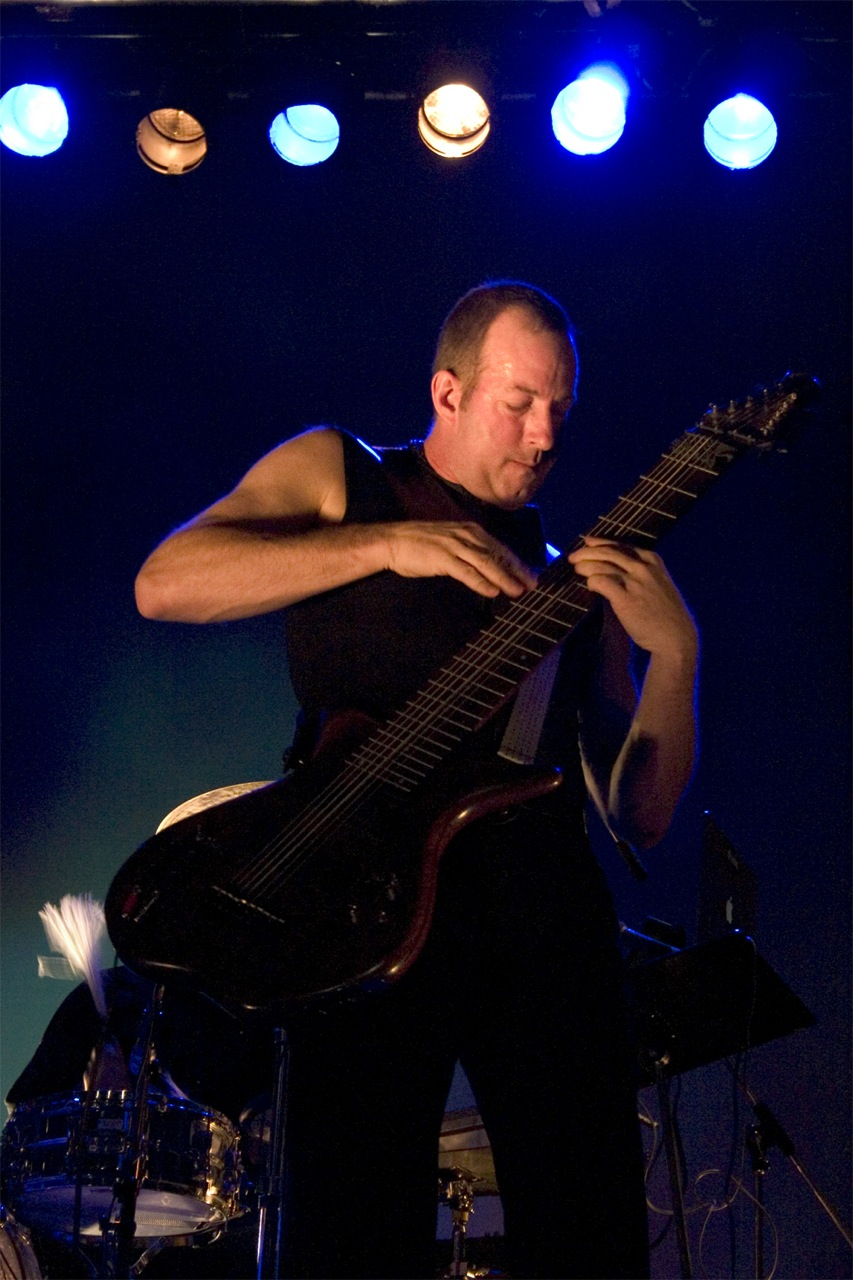
Touch guitarist Trey Gunn was a mainstay of the King Crimson lineup during the 1990s and early 2000s.

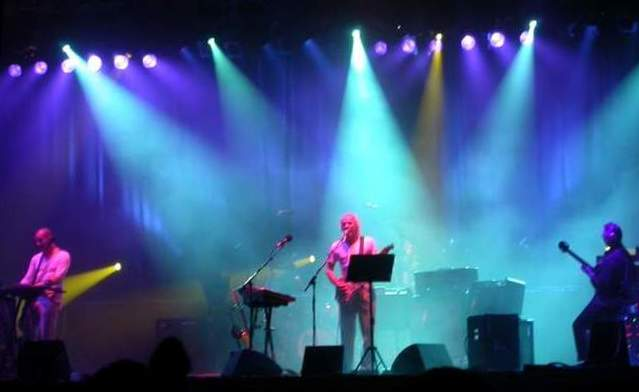
King Crimson playing in 2003

The ProjeKcts spawned several studio and live recordings, which were issued in 1999 as part of The ProjeKcts box set. By this time the lineup of King Crimson was a "Double Duo" consisting of Belew, Fripp, Gunn and Mastelotto, following the departures of Bruford and Levin. The band released two new studio albums, The ConstruKction of Light and The Power to Believe, before Gunn announced in November 2003 that he was leaving to explore new musical opportunities. Levin returned to take his place. Rehearsals subsequently began for planned new material, with a string of rehearsal sessions taking place in September 2004, before the group was placed "on hold" once again.

In June 2007, Fripp announced that a new lineup of King Crimson had been finalised for the band's 40th anniversary tour the following year. In addition to the members of the 2004 incarnation, Gavin Harrison of Porcupine Tree was added as a second drummer. The tour took place in August 2008, after which members returned to focus on other projects.

In December 2010, Fripp wrote that the King Crimson "switch" had been set to "off" since October 2008, citing several reasons for this decision. This was followed by Fripp's announcement of his retirement from the music industry in August 2012.

=== 2013 onwards ===
In September 2013, despite claiming the previous year that he was retiring, Fripp announced another reformation of King Crimson. In addition to Levin, Mastoletto and Harrison, the eighth lineup was confirmed to include returning saxophonist and flautist Mel Collins, new guitarist and vocalist Jakko Jakszyk, and third drummer Bill Rieflin. In March 2016, Jeremy Stacey replaced Rieflin for the year's touring, becoming a full member during the winter leg of the tour. Rieflin switched over to being the band's first full-time keyboardist upon his return in January 2017.

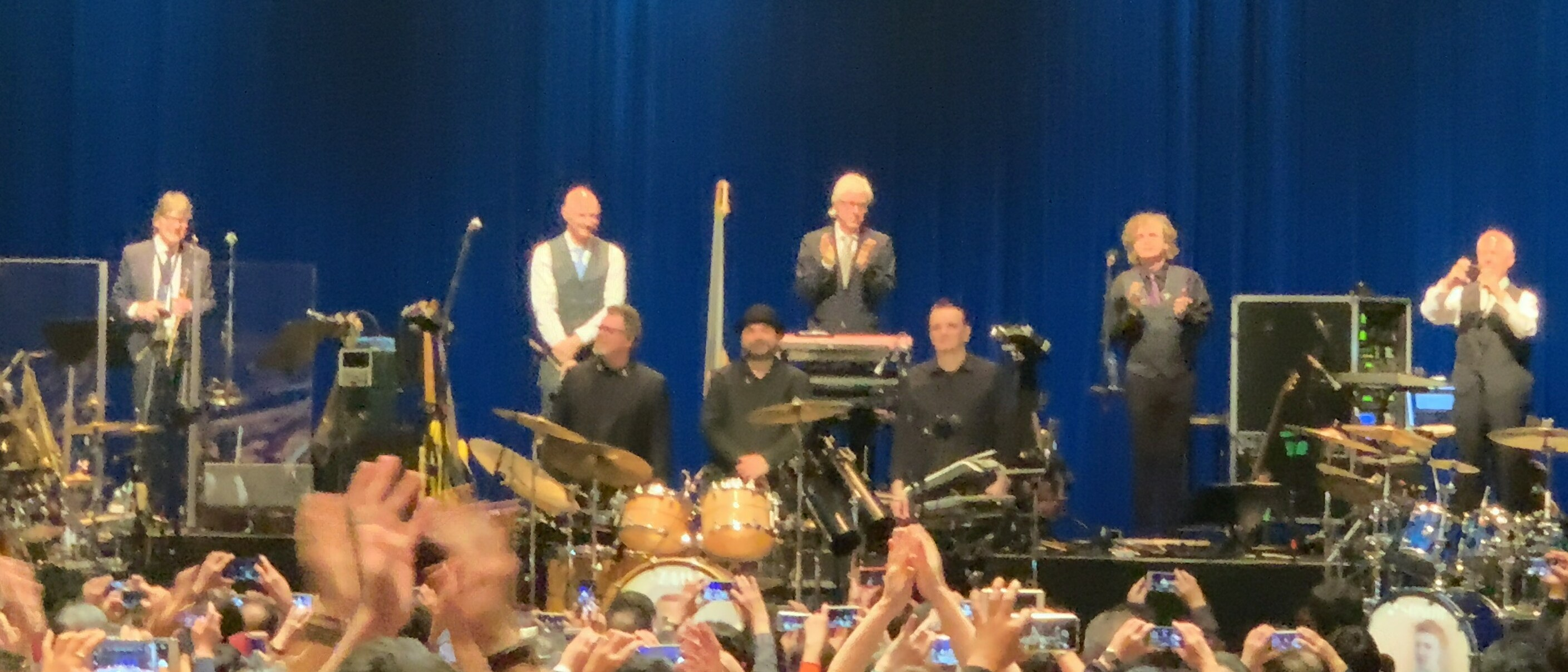
King Crimson in 2018

Rieflin was temporarily replaced again for an autumn 2017 tour by Chris Gibson. For the band's 50th anniversary tour in 2019, it was announced that Rieflin would once more be temporarily replaced, this time by Theo Travis. However, after a day of rehearsal, the band opted instead to do the 2019 tour as a seven-piece. Rieflin's parts were divided among other band members, with Jakszyk and Collins adding keyboards to their on-stage rigs, and Levin once again using the synthesizer he used during the 1980s tours. Rieflin died of cancer on March 23, 2020, reducing the line-up to a septet.

On December 8, 2021, the band played the last show of their "Music Is Our Friend" tour, after which Fripp tweeted out that the band had "Moved from sound to silence", Levin published in his blog “Tonight is the final concert of the tour, and quite possibly the final King Crimson concert." No announcements have been heard from the band since December, though Harrison has said that he is unsure whether the band is over. The band was not musically active in 2022, with Fripp re-stating that the band is unlikely to tour again. Some band members made later studio recordings of their parts for material written during the last phase of the band's live work, but Fripp confirmed in May 2026 that plans for a new record had stalled and the band were indeed over.

== Members ==
Note: Release contributions do not include albums issued as part of the King Crimson Collector's Club, or other limited releases.

=== Final line-up ===
Image	Name	Years active	Instruments	Release contributions
	Robert Fripp	1968–1974; 1981–1984; 1994–2008; 2013–2021	guitar; keyboards; Mellotron; electronics; samples; effects	all King Crimson releases
	Mel Collins	1970–1972; 2013–2021 (session contributor in 1974)	saxophones; flute; bass flute; Mellotron (1971–72); keyboards (2019–2021); backing vocals (1971)	all releases from In the Wake of Poseidon (1970) to Earthbound (1972); Red (1974) – as session contributor; Ladies of the Road (2002); all releases from Live at the Orpheum (2015) onwards
	Tony Levin	1981–1984; 1994–1999; 2003–2008; 2013–2021	bass; touch bass; Chapman stick; synthesisers (1981-94, 2019–2021); backing vocals	all releases from Discipline (1981) to Three of a Perfect Pair: Live in Japan (1984); all releases from Vrooom (1994) to Live in Japan (1996); Absent Lovers: Live in Montreal (1998); Live in Mexico City (1999); The ProjeKcts (1999); Vrooom Vrooom (2001); all releases from Live at the Orpheum (2015) onwards
	Pat Mastelotto	1994–2008; 2013–2021	electronic and acoustic drums; acoustic and electronic percussion	all releases from Vrooom (1994) to Live in Japan (1996); all releases from Live in Mexico City (1999) to Vrooom Vrooom (2001); all releases from Happy with What You Have to Be Happy With (2002) onwards
	Gavin Harrison	2007–2008; 2013–2021	acoustic and electronic drums; electronic and acoustic percussion	all releases from Live at the Orpheum (2015) onwards
	Jakko Jakszyk	2013–2021	guitar; keyboards (2019–2021); flute; lead vocals; lyrics	all releases from Live at the Orpheum (2015) onwards
	Jeremy Stacey	2016–2021	drums; keyboards; backing vocals	all releases from Heroes (2017) onwards

=== Former members ===
Image	Name	Years active	Instruments	Release contributions
	Peter Sinfield	1968–1971 (died 2024)	lyrics; light shows; synthesisers (1970-1971)	all releases from In the Court of the Crimson King (1969) to Islands (1971); Epitaph (1997); Ladies of the Road (2002)
	Michael Giles	1968–1970	drums; percussion; backing vocals	In the Court of the Crimson King (1969); In the Wake of Poseidon (1970); Epitaph (1997)
	Greg Lake	1968–1970 (died 2016)	bass; lead vocals	In the Court of the Crimson King (1969); In the Wake of Poseidon (1970); Epitaph (1997)
	Ian McDonald	1968–1970 (session contributor in 1974) (died 2022)	saxophones; flute; clarinet; bass clarinet; keyboards; Mellotron; vibraphone; backing and occasional lead vocals	In the Court of the Crimson King (1969); Red (1974) – as session contributor; Epitaph (1997)
	Peter Giles	1970	bass	In the Wake of Poseidon (1970)
	Gordon Haskell	1970 (session contributor earlier in 1970) (died 2020)	bass; lead vocals	In the Wake of Poseidon (1970) – as session contributor; Lizard (1970)
	Andy McCulloch	1970	drums	Lizard (1970)
	Raymond "Boz" Burrell	1971–1972 (died 2006)	bass; lead vocals	Islands (1971); Earthbound (1972); Ladies of the Road (2002)
	Ian Wallace	1971–1972 (died 2007)	drums; percussion; backing vocals	Islands (1971); Earthbound (1972); Ladies of the Road (2002)
	Bill Bruford	1972–1974; 1981–1984; 1994–1999	drums; percussion	all releases from Larks' Tongues in Aspic (1973) to Live in Japan (1996), and from The Night Watch (1997) to The ProjeKcts (1999); Vrooom Vrooom (2001)
	John Wetton	1972–1974 (died 2017)	bass; piano; lead vocals; violin	all releases from Larks' Tongues in Aspic (1973) to USA (1975); The Great Deceiver (1992); The Night Watch (1997)
	David Cross	1972–1974	violin; viola; flute; keyboards	all releases from Larks' Tongues in Aspic (1973) to USA (1975); The Great Deceiver (1992); The Night Watch (1997)
	Jamie Muir	1972–1973 (died 2025)	percussion; drums	Larks' Tongues in Aspic (1973)
	Adrian Belew	1981–1984; 1994–2008	guitar; lead vocals; occasional drums and percussion; lyrics	all releases from Discipline (1981) to Three of a Perfect Pair: Live in Japan (1984); all releases from Vrooom (1994) to Live in Japan (1996); all releases from Absent Lovers: Live in Montreal (1998) to Vrooom Vrooom (2001); all releases from Happy with What You Have to Be Happy With (2002) to Eyes Wide Open (2003)
	Trey Gunn	1994–2003	Warr guitar; Chapman stick; backing vocals; touch bass; bass (1999–2003)	all releases from Vrooom (1994) to Live in Japan (1996); all releases from Live in Mexico City (1999) to Vrooom Vrooom (2001); all releases from Happy with What You Have to Be Happy With (2002) to Eyes Wide Open (2003)
	Bill Rieflin	2013–2016; 2017–2019; (died 2020)	keyboards, synthesisers; Mellotron; drums, percussion, backing vocals (2013–2016)	Live at the Orpheum (2015); Radical Action to Unseat the Hold of Monkey Mind (2016); Live in Chicago (2017); Meltdown: Live in Mexico City (2018)

=== Touring musicians ===
Image	Name	Years active	Instruments	Details
	Chris Gibson	2017	keyboards; synthesisers; Mellotron	Gibson temporarily replaced Bill Rieflin during an autumn 2017 concert tour. He appears on the second half of the 2017 disc of Audio Diary 2014-2018.

=== Session contributors ===
Image	Name	Years active	Instruments	Release contributions
	Keith Tippett	1970–1971 (died 2020)	piano	In the Wake of Poseidon (1970); Lizard (1970); Islands (1971)
	Mark Charig	1970–1971; 1974	cornet	Lizard (1970); Islands (1971); Red (1974)
	Robin Miller	1970–1971; 1974; (died 2014)	oboe; english horn	Lizard (1970); Islands (1971); Red (1974)
	Nick Evans	1970	trombone	Lizard (1970)
	Jon Anderson	1970	vocals	Lizard (1970)
	Paulina Lucas	1971 (died 2010)	vocals	Islands (1971)
	Wilf Gibson	1971 (died 2014)	violin; string section conductor	Islands (1971)
	Harry Miller	1971 (died 1983)	double bass	Islands (1971)
	Richard Palmer-James	1973–1974	lyrics	Larks' Tongues in Aspic (1973); Starless and Bible Black (1974); Red (1974)
	Eddie Jobson	1975	violin; electric piano	Studio overdubs on USA (1975)

== Line-ups ==
=== King Crimson ===
Period	Members	Releases
November 1968 – January 1970	Robert Fripp – guitar; Michael Giles – drums, percussion, backing vocals; Greg Lake – lead vocals, bass; Ian McDonald – woodwinds, keyboards, backing vocals; Peter Sinfield – lyrics, lighting	In the Court of the Crimson King (1969); Frame by Frame: The Essential King Crimson – box set (1991); Epitaph (1997); The 21st Century Guide to King Crimson Volume One 1969–1974 – box set (2004); In the Court of the Crimson King (1969) – 40th Anniversary edition – box set (2010); The Complete 1969 Recordings – box set (2020)
January – April 1970	Robert Fripp – guitar, keyboards, electronics; Michael Giles – drums; Greg Lake – lead vocals; Peter Sinfield – lyrics; Mel Collins – woodwinds; Peter Giles – bass	In the Wake of Poseidon (1970); Frame by Frame: The Essential King Crimson – box set (1991); The 21st Century Guide to King Crimson Volume One 1969–1974 – box set (2004); Sailors' Tales (1970–1972) – 40th Anniversary edition – box set (2017)
August – November 1970	Robert Fripp – guitar, keyboards, electronics; Peter Sinfield – lyrics, synthesizers; Mel Collins – woodwinds; Gordon Haskell – lead vocals, bass; Andy McCulloch – drums	Lizard (1970); Frame by Frame: The Essential King Crimson – box set (1991); The 21st Century Guide to King Crimson Volume One 1969–1974 – box set (2004); Sailors' Tales (1970–1972) – 40th Anniversary edition – box set (2017)
February – December 1971	Robert Fripp – guitar, keyboards, electronics; Peter Sinfield – lyrics, synthesizers, lighting; Mel Collins – woodwinds, keyboards, backing vocals; Boz Burrell – lead vocals, bass; Ian Wallace – drums, percussion, backing vocals	Islands (1971); Frame by Frame: The Essential King Crimson – box set (1991); Ladies of the Road (2002); The 21st Century Guide to King Crimson Volume One 1969–1974 – box set (2004); Sailors' Tales (1970–1972) – 40th Anniversary edition – box set (2017)
December 1971 – April 1972	Robert Fripp – guitar, keyboards, electronics; Mel Collins – woodwinds, keyboards, backing vocals; Boz Burrell – lead vocals, bass; Ian Wallace – drums, percussion, backing vocals	Earthbound (1972); Ladies of the Road (2002); The 21st Century Guide to King Crimson Volume One 1969–1974 – box set (2004); Sailors' Tales (1970–1972) – 40th Anniversary edition – box set (2017)
July 1972 – February 1973	Robert Fripp – guitar, keyboards, electronics; Bill Bruford – drums, percussion; David Cross – violin, viola, keyboards; Jamie Muir – percussion; John Wetton – lead vocals, bass	Larks' Tongues in Aspic (1973); Frame by Frame: The Essential King Crimson – box set (1991); The 21st Century Guide to King Crimson Volume One 1969–1974 – box set (2004); Larks' Tongues in Aspic (1972–1973) – 40th Anniversary edition – box set (2012)
February 1973 – July 1974	Robert Fripp – guitar, keyboards, electronics; Bill Bruford – drums, percussion; David Cross – violin, viola, keyboards; John Wetton – lead vocals, bass	Starless and Bible Black (1974); Red (1974); USA (1975); Frame by Frame: The Essential King Crimson – box set (1991); The Great Deceiver – box set (1992); The Night Watch (1997); The 21st Century Guide to King Crimson Volume One 1969–1974 – box set (2004); The Road to Red (1974) – 40th Anniversary edition – box set (2013); Starless (1973–1974) – 40th Anniversary edition – box set (2014)
July – September 1974	Robert Fripp – guitar, keyboards, electronics; Bill Bruford – drums, percussion; John Wetton – lead vocals, bass	Red (1974); Frame by Frame: The Essential King Crimson – box set (1991); The 21st Century Guide to King Crimson Volume One 1969–1974 – box set (2004); The Road to Red (1974) – 40th Anniversary edition – box set (2013)
Band inactive September 1974 – April 1981
April 1981 – July 1984	Robert Fripp – guitar, keyboards, electronics; Bill Bruford – drums, percussion; Adrian Belew – lead vocals, guitar; Tony Levin – bass, Chapman stick, backing vocals	Discipline (1981); Beat (1982); Three of a Perfect Pair (1984); The Noise VHS (1984); Three of a Perfect Pair: Live in Japan VHS (1984); Frame by Frame: The Essential King Crimson – box set (1991); Absent Lovers: Live in Montreal (1998); Neal and Jack and Me DVD (2004); The 21st Century Guide to King Crimson Volume Two 1981–2003 – box set (2005); On (and off) The Road (1981–1984) – 40th Anniversary edition – box set (2016)
Band inactive July 1984 – April 1994
April 1994 – March 1999	Robert Fripp – guitar, keyboards, electronics; Bill Bruford – drums, percussion; Adrian Belew – lead vocals, guitar; Tony Levin – bass, Chapman stick, backing vocals; Trey Gunn – Warr guitar, Chapman stick, backing vocals; Pat Mastelotto – drums, percussion	Vrooom EP (1994); Thrak (1995); B'Boom: Live in Argentina (1995); Thrakattak (1996); Live in Japan VHS (1996); Live in Mexico City (1999); Déjà Vrooom DVD (1999); Vrooom Vrooom (2001); The 21st Century Guide to King Crimson Volume Two 1981–2003 – box set (2005); Live in Argentina DVD (2012); THRAK (1994–1997) – 40th Anniversary edition – box set (2014)
March 1999 – December 2003	Robert Fripp – guitar, keyboards, electronics; Adrian Belew – lead vocals, guitar; Trey Gunn – Warr guitar, touch bass, backing vocals; Pat Mastelotto – drums, percussion	The Construkction of Light (2000); Heavy ConstruKction (2000); Level Five EP (2001); Happy with What You Have to Be Happy With EP (2002); The Power to Believe (2003); EleKtrik: Live in Japan (2003); Eyes Wide Open DVD (2003); The 21st Century Guide to King Crimson Volume Two 1981–2003 – box set (2005); Heaven & Earth (1997–2008) – 50th Anniversary edition – box set (2019)
December 2003 – June 2007	Robert Fripp – guitar, keyboards, electronics; Adrian Belew – lead vocals, guitar; Pat Mastelotto – drums, percussion; Tony Levin – bass, Chapman stick, backing vocals	The 21st Century Guide to King Crimson Volume Two 1981–2003 – box set (2005)
June 2007 – August 2008	Robert Fripp – guitar, keyboards, electronics; Adrian Belew – lead vocals, guitar; Pat Mastelotto – drums, percussion; Tony Levin – bass, Chapman stick, backing vocals; Gavin Harrison – drums, percussion	Heaven & Earth (1997–2008) – 50th Anniversary edition – box set (2019)
Band inactive August 2008 – September 2013
September 2013 – March 2016	Robert Fripp – guitar, keyboards, electronics; Pat Mastelotto – drums, percussion; Tony Levin – bass, Chapman stick, backing vocals; Gavin Harrison – drums, percussion; Mel Collins – woodwinds; Jakko Jakszyk – lead vocals, guitar; Bill Rieflin – drums, keyboards, backing vocals	Live at the Orpheum (2015); Cyclops EP (2015); Live in Toronto (2016); Radical Action to Unseat the Hold of Monkey Mind (2016); Audio Diary 2014–2018 – box set (2019)
March 2016 – January 2017	Robert Fripp – guitar, keyboards, electronics; Pat Mastelotto – drums, percussion; Tony Levin – bass, Chapman stick, backing vocals; Gavin Harrison – drums, percussion; Mel Collins – woodwinds, keyboards; Jakko Jakszyk – lead vocals, guitar; Jeremy Stacey – drums, keyboards, backing vocals	Heroes EP (2017); Live in Vienna (2018); Audio Diary 2014–2018 – box set (2019)
January 2017 – April 2019	Robert Fripp – guitar, keyboards, electronics; Pat Mastelotto – drums, percussion; Tony Levin – bass, Chapman stick, backing vocals; Gavin Harrison – drums, percussion; Mel Collins – woodwinds, keyboards; Jakko Jakszyk – lead vocals, guitar; Jeremy Stacey – drums, keyboards, backing vocals; Bill Rieflin – keyboards	Live in Chicago (2017); Meltdown: Live in Mexico (2018); Audio Diary 2014–2018 – box set (2019)
April 2019 – December 2021	Robert Fripp – guitar, keyboards, electronics; Pat Mastelotto – drums, percussion; Tony Levin – bass, Chapman stick, backing vocals; Gavin Harrison – drums, percussion; Mel Collins – woodwinds, keyboards; Jakko Jakszyk – lead vocals, guitar; Jeremy Stacey – drums, keyboards, backing vocals	Music Is Our Friend: Live in Washington and Albany (2021)

=== Spin-off bands ===
Period	Members	Releases
ProjeKct One (December 1997; first ProjeKct conceived but second to undertake work)	Robert Fripp – guitar, electronics; Bill Bruford – drums, percussion; Tony Levin – bass, Chapman stick, synthesizers; Trey Gunn – touch guitar	Live at the Jazz Café (1998); The ProjeKcts – box set (1999); Jazz Café Suite (2003); Heaven & Earth (1997–2008) – 50th Anniversary edition – box set (2019)
ProjeKct Two (November 1997 – July 1998; second ProjeKct conceived but first to undertake work)	Robert Fripp – guitar, electronics; Adrian Belew – electronic drums; Trey Gunn – touch guitar, guitar synthesizers	Space Groove (1998); The ProjeKcts – box set (1999); Live in Northampton, MA, July 1, 1998 (2001); Live in Chicago, IL, June 04–05, 1998 (2007); Heaven & Earth (1997–2008) – 50th Anniversary edition – box set (2019)
ProjeKct Three (March 1999 and March 2003; third ProjeKct conceived but fourth to undertake work)	Robert Fripp – guitar, electronics; Pat Mastelotto – electronic drums, programming; Trey Gunn – touch guitar	The ProjeKcts – box set (1999); Live in Austin, TX, 1999 (2003); Live in Alexandria, Virginia, VA, March 3, 2003 (2007); Heaven & Earth (1997–2008) – 50th Anniversary edition – box set (2019)
ProjeKct Four (October – November 1998; fourth ProjeKct conceived but third to undertake work)	Robert Fripp – guitar, electronics; Tony Levin – bass, Chapman stick; Pat Mastelotto – electronic drums, programming; Trey Gunn – touch guitar	The ProjeKcts – box set (1999); Live in San Francisco/The Roar of P4 (1999); Heaven & Earth (1997–2008) – 50th Anniversary edition – box set (2019)
ProjeKct X (December 1999 – May 2000; same personnel as then-current King Crimson line-up)	Robert Fripp – guitar, electronics; Adrian Belew – guitar, electronic drums; Pat Mastelotto – electronic drums, programming; Trey Gunn – touch guitar, baritone guitar	Heaven and Earth (2000); Heaven & Earth (1997–2008) – 50th Anniversary edition – box set (2019)
21st Century Schizoid Band (2002–2003)	Ian McDonald – woodwinds, keyboards, backing vocals; Mel Collins – woodwinds, keyboards, backing vocals; Peter Giles – bass, backing vocals; Jakko Jakszyk – lead vocals, guitar; Michael Giles – drums, percussion, vocals	Official Bootleg Volume One (2002); Live in Japan (2003)
21st Century Schizoid Band (2003–2004)	Ian McDonald – woodwinds, keyboards, backing vocals; Mel Collins – woodwinds, keyboards, backing vocals; Peter Giles – bass, backing vocals; Jakko Jakszyk – lead vocals, guitar; Ian Wallace – drums, percussion, vocals	Live in Italy (2003); Pictures of a City: Live in New York (2006); Live in Barcelona (2024)
ProjeKct Six (October 2006)	Robert Fripp – guitar, electronics; Adrian Belew – electronic drums	East Coast Live (2006); Heaven & Earth (1997–2008) – 50th Anniversary edition – box set (2019)
Jakszyk, Fripp and Collins: A King Crimson ProjeKct (February 2009 – May 2011)	Jakko Jakszyk – lead vocals, guitar, keyboards; Robert Fripp – guitar, electronics; Mel Collins – woodwinds; Tony Levin – bass, Chapman stick; Gavin Harrison – drums, percussion	A Scarcity of Miracles (2011)
The Crimson ProjeKct (2011–2014)	Adrian Belew – lead vocals, guitar; Tony Levin – Chapman stick, bass, backing vocals; Pat Mastelotto – drums, percussion; Tobias Ralph – drums, percussion; Markus Reuter – touch guitar; Julie Slick – bass	Official Bootleg Live 2012 (2013); Official Bootleg Limited Edition (Live Record At Club Citta' On Mar.15.2013) (2013); Official Bootleg Limited Edition (Live Record At Club Citta' On Mar.16.2013) (2013); Official Bootleg Limited Edition (Live Record At Club Citta' On Mar.17.2013) (2013); Live in Tokyo (2014); Premium Pass (2014); Official Bootleg Live - Extended Edition (2014); Live (2015)
Beat (September 2024–present)	Adrian Belew – lead vocals, guitar; Tony Levin – bass, Chapman stick; Danny Carey – drums, percussion; Steve Vai – guitar	Neon Heat Disease: Live in Los Angeles (2025)

== Works cited ==
- Smith, Sid (2002). In The Court of King Crimson. Helter Skelter Publishing.
- Smith, Sid (2019). In The Court of King Crimson: An Observation over Fifty Years. Panegyric Publishing.
