= Meltdown: Live in Mexico City =

Live album by King Crimson
- Released: 20 October 2018
- Recorded: 14–19 July 2017
- Venue: Teatro Metropólitan in Mexico City
- Genre: Progressive rock
- Length: 218:07
- Label: Discipline Global Mobile
- Producer: Bill Rieflin (mix production), Robert Fripp, David Singleton

King Crimson chronology
Live in Vienna (2018)	Meltdown: Live in Mexico City (2018)	Music Is Our Friend: Live in Washington and Albany (2021)

Meltdown: Live in Mexico City is a Blu-ray and triple-disc CD live album by the English progressive rock band King Crimson. Recorded over five nights in July 2017, Meltdown was released on 20 October 2018 and was produced by the band's keyboardist Bill Rieflin from Multitrack recordings. The release was announced in August 2018 and was preceded by streaming of the track "Indiscipline" on 4 October.

== Content ==
Comprising three compact discs and a Blu-ray, Meltdown: Live in Mexico City documents an incarnation of King Crimson that the group's founder Robert Fripp described as "the best band I’ve been in, musically, personally, professionally." The three CDs distill King Crimson's five concerts in Mexico City from 14 to 19 July 2017 down to three and a half hours, and the Blu-ray video further condenses the performances to two and a half hours.

Meltdown marked the first release to feature recordings of the band's extended lineup playing "Breathless", "Discipline", "Moonchild" and the cadenzas of Tony Levin and Jeremy Stacey. These recordings are taken from concerts during the band's June–July 2018 European tour, and are featured at the end of the third disc as the 2018 Official Bootleg.

In his road diary, Levin surmised that the series of concerts would impact how the band played in the future.

== Critical reception ==
Professional ratings
Review scores
Source	Rating
All About Jazz	4.5/5 stars

Writing for All About Jazz, John Kelman praised Meltdown, highlighting the video recording of the performance as well-edited. He considered the release an improvement on 2016's similar box set, Radical Action to Unseat the Hold of Monkey Mind.

== Track listing ==
Disc one
No.	Title	Writers	Length
1.	"Walk On"	Robert Fripp, Mel Collins, Tony Levin	3:46
2.	"Larks' Tongues in Aspic, Part One"	David Cross, Fripp, John Wetton, Bill Bruford, Jamie Muir	9:28
3.	"Neurotica"	Adrian Belew, Fripp, Levin, Bruford	4:57
4.	"Cirkus"	Fripp, Peter Sinfield	7:40
5.	"Dawn Song" (Lizard: The Battle of Glass Tears, Part I)	Fripp, Sinfield	2:19
6.	"Last Skirmish" (Lizard: The Battle of Glass Tears, Part II)	Fripp	6:10
7.	"Prince Rupert's Lament" (Lizard: The Battle of Glass Tears, Part III)	Fripp	2:30
8.	"The Hell Hounds of Krim"	Gavin Harrison, Bill Rieflin, Pat Mastelotto	3:42
9.	"Red"	Fripp	6:42
10.	"Fallen Angel"	Fripp, Wetton, Richard Palmer-James	6:08
11.	"Islands"	Fripp, Sinfield	9:02
12.	"The Talking Drum"	Cross, Fripp, Wetton, Bruford, Muir	3:48
13.	"Larks' Tongues in Aspic, Part Two"	Fripp	7:02
Total length:			73:14

Disc two
No.	Title	Writers	Length
1.	"Indiscipline"	Belew, Fripp, Levin, Bruford	7:59
2.	"The ConstruKction of Light" (Part I only)	Belew, Fripp, Trey Gunn, Mastelotto	6:05
3.	"Epitaph"	Fripp, Ian McDonald, Greg Lake, Michael Giles, Sinfield	8:33
4.	"Banshee Legs Bell Hassle"	Harrison, Mastelotto, Rieflin	1:40
5.	"Easy Money"	Fripp, Wetton, Palmer-James	9:56
6.	"Interlude"	Fripp	2:47
7.	"The Letters"	Fripp, Sinfield	6:12
8.	"Sailor's Tale"	Fripp	6:24
9.	"CatalytiKc No. 9"	Harrison, Mastelotto, Jeremy Stacey	1:12
10.	"Meltdown"	Jakko Jakszyk, Fripp	4:22
11.	"Radical Action II"	Fripp	2:28
12.	"Level Five"	Belew, Fripp, Gunn, Mastelotto	7:08
13.	"Starless"	Cross, Fripp, Wetton, Bruford, Palmer-James	12:46
Total length:			77:32

Disc three
No.	Title	Writers	Length
1.	"Peace – An End"	Fripp, Sinfield	1:56
2.	"Pictures of a City"	Fripp, Sinfield	8:22
3.	"Devil Dogs of Tessellation Row"	Harrison, Rieflin, Mastelotto	3:10
4.	"Fracture"	Fripp	11:03
5.	"The Court of the Crimson King"	McDonald, Sinfield	7:03
6.	"'Heroes'"	David Bowie, Brian Eno	4:42
7.	"21st Century Schizoid Man"	Fripp, McDonald, Lake, Giles, Sinfield	13:13
8.	"Discipline"	Belew, Fripp, Levin, Bruford	5:29
9.	"Moonchild"	Fripp, McDonald, Lake, Giles, Sinfield	2:27
10.	"Tony's Cadenza"	Levin	1:20
11.	"Jeremy's Cadenza"	Stacey	1:06
12.	"Breathless"	Fripp	4:59
13.	"Cool Jam"		2:31
Total length:			67:35

Blu-ray video
No.	Title	Length
1.	"Walk On"	3:28
2.	"Neurotica"	4:51
3.	"Pictures of a City"	8:23
4.	"Cirkus"	7:34
5.	"Dawn Song" (Lizard: The Battle of Glass Tears, Part I)	2:19
6.	"Last Skirmish" (Lizard: The Battle of Glass Tears, Part II)	6:10
7.	"Prince Rupert's Lament" (Lizard: The Battle of Glass Tears, Part III)	2:26
8.	"Epitaph"	8:31
9.	"Devil Dogs of Tessellation Row"	3:09
10.	"Fracture"	11:05
11.	"Islands"	10:10
12.	"Indiscipline"	8:03
13.	"Peace – An End"	1:56
14.	"Easy Money"	9:55
15.	"Interlude"	2:47
16.	"The Letters"	6:13
17.	"The Sailor's Tale"	6:23
18.	"CatalytiKc No. 9"	1:13
19.	"Fallen Angel"	6:00
20.	"The Talking Drum"	3:48
21.	"Larks' Tongues in Aspic, Part Two"	6:51
22.	"Starless"	13:24
23.	"The Hell Hounds of Krim"	3:39
24.	"21st Century Schizoid Man"	13:58
Total length:		152:16

== Personnel ==
Credits adapted from liner notes

King Crimson

- Jakko Jakszyk – guitar, flute, voice
- Robert Fripp – guitar, keyboard, production, liner notes
- Mel Collins – saxophones, flute
- Bill Rieflin – keyboards, mix production
- Tony Levin – basses, Stick, backing vocals, photography
- Pat Mastelotto – drums, percussion, additional footage
- Gavin Harrison – drums, percussion
- Jeremy Stacey – drums, percussion, keyboards

Technical personnel

- David Singleton – production, compilation, mastering, photography
- Don Gunn – mixing
- Matt Skerritt – video director
- David Taylor – cameras
- Chris Porter – bonus tracks live mixing
- Neil Wilkes – Blu-ray mastering
- Bearhand Design – artwork, design

== Charts ==
Chart (2018)	Peak position
German Albums (Offizielle Top 100)	58
Italian Albums (FIMI)	84
Scottish Albums (OCC)	48
