= Live in Toronto (King Crimson album) =

Live album by King Crimson
- Released: 29 February 2016 digital download 17 March 2016 CD
- Recorded: 20 November 2015
- Venue: Queen Elizabeth Theatre, Toronto, Canada
- Genre: Progressive rock
- Length: 126:56
- Label: Discipline Global Mobile
- Producer: King Crimson

King Crimson chronology
Live at the Orpheum (2015)	Live in Toronto (2016)	Radical Action to Unseat the Hold of Monkey Mind (2016)

Live in Toronto is a live album by the English progressive rock band King Crimson, released by Discipline Global Mobile records in 2016. The album was recorded on 20 November at the Queen Elizabeth Theatre in Toronto, Canada during the band's The Elements of King Crimson tour of 2015. It is the second full-length release by the current seven-piece incarnation of the band and featured new compositions never before released by the band on record.

== Reception ==
Professional ratings
Review scores
Source	Rating
AllMusic	4.5/5 stars

The album has received positive reviews. John Kelman, writing for All About Jazz, praises the new lineup, noting "… with the triple drum set arrangements, twin guitars, reeds and woodwinds, and bass and stick, all played by top- drawer musicians capable of respecting every song's formal construction while, at the same time, introducing interpretive variations and impressive solos, this is no tribute band; this is a Crimson… bringing the music firmly into the 21st Century."

Regarding the new compositions, Dom Lawson writes for Prog magazine, "Part wholesale reinvention, part meticulous refinement, the… new material crackles and pops with exuberance and the infectious thump of hearts buoyed by fresh adrenalin."

== Track listing ==
=== Disc one ===
No.	Title	Writers	Length
1.	"Threshold Soundscape"	Robert Fripp, Tony Levin, Mel Collins	4:00
2.	"Larks’ Tongues in Aspic: Part One" (from Larks' Tongues in Aspic)	David Cross, Fripp, John Wetton, Bill Bruford, Jamie Muir	10:30
3.	"Pictures of a City" (from In the Wake of Poseidon)	Fripp, Peter Sinfield	8:32
4.	"VROOOM" (from Thrak)	Adrian Belew, Fripp, Levin, Trey Gunn, Bruford, Pat Mastelotto	5:19
5.	"Radical Action (To Unseat the Hold of Monkey Mind)"	Jakko Jakszyk, Fripp	3:21
6.	"Meltdown"	Jakszyk, Fripp	4:51
7.	"The Hell Hounds of Krim"	Gavin Harrison, Bill Rieflin, Mastelotto	3:31
8.	"The ConstruKction of Light" (from The Construkction of Light)	Belew, Fripp, Gunn, Mastelotto	6:45
9.	"Red" (from Red)	Fripp	6:47
10.	"Epitaph" (from In the Court of the Crimson King)	Fripp, Ian McDonald, Greg Lake, Michael Giles, Sinfield	9:02

=== Disc two ===
No.	Title	Writers	Length
1.	"Banshee Legs Bell Hassle"	Harrison, Rieflin, Mastelotto	1:44
2.	"Easy Money" (from Larks' Tongues in Aspic)	Fripp, Wetton, Richard Palmer-James	8:34
3.	"Level Five" (from The Power to Believe)	Belew, Fripp, Gunn, Mastelotto	7:04
4.	"The Letters" (from Islands)	Fripp, Sinfield	5:39
5.	"Sailor's Tale" (from Islands)	Fripp	6:57
6.	"Starless" (from Red)	Cross, Fripp, Wetton, Bruford, Palmer-James	15:19
7.	"The Court of the Crimson King" (from In the Court of the Crimson King)	McDonald, Sinfield	7:18
8.	"21st Century Schizoid Man" (from In the Court of the Crimson King)	Fripp, McDonald, Lake, Giles, Sinfield	11:42

== Personnel ==
King Crimson

Front Line

- Pat Mastelotto – drums, electronic percussion
- Bill Rieflin – drums, electronic percussion, keyboards
- Gavin Harrison – drums, electronic percussion

Back Line

- Mel Collins – saxophones, flutes
- Tony Levin – basses, Chapman Stick, backing vocals
- Jakko Jakszyk – guitar, lead vocals
- Robert Fripp – guitar, guitar synth, keyboard

Production

- Trevor Wilkens – audio recorder
