= Live in Chicago (King Crimson album) =

Live album by King Crimson
- Released: 14 October 2017
- Recorded: 28 June 2017
- Venue: Chicago Theatre, Chicago, Illinois
- Genre: Progressive rock
- Length: 155:45
- Label: Discipline Global Mobile
- Producer: King Crimson

King Crimson chronology
Radical Action to Unseat the Hold of Monkey Mind (2016)	Live in Chicago (2017)	Live in Vienna (2018)

Live in Chicago, or Official Bootleg: Live in Chicago, June 28, 2017, is a live album by the English progressive rock band King Crimson, released through Discipline Global Mobile records on 14 October 2017. The album was recorded on 28 June at the Chicago Theatre in Chicago, Illinois during the band's 2017 United States tour. It is the first full-length release by the eight-piece incarnation of the band and features new songs and rearrangements of compositions mostly from the early 1970s.

== The performance ==
For the American leg of King Crimson's 2017 tour, the band was composed of three drummers, two guitarists, a bassist, a keyboardist, and a saxophonist/flautist – a lineup known as the "double quartet". Much of the performance is made up of old King Crimson material rearranged to fit the band's new format. Founding King Crimson member Robert Fripp said about the performance, "If we are looking for a KC live show; Chicago was exceptional," and bassist Tony Levin called the show "one of our best."

== Critical reception ==
Professional ratings
Review scores
Source	Rating
All About Jazz	4.5/5 stars
The Spill Magazine	4/5 stars
Team Rock	4/5 stars

Live in Chicago received positive reviews. Writing for All About Jazz, John Kelman praised the album extensively, writing that it "is not just another superb entry in a series of fine live recordings from this current—and soon to be longest-lasting—edition of King Crimson. It's also reason enough, even for those who've seen the band many times since 2014, to make catching King Crimson on its next return to their neck of the woods a most definite slam dunk." Chris Roberts of Team Rock lauded the performances, saying the encore of "'Heroes'" was earned. The Spill Magazine critic Aaron Badgley wrote, "It is almost like a whole new album by King Crimson. This is an excellent live album, and an example of how good live albums can be."

== Track listing ==
Disc one
No.	Title	Writers	Length
1.	"Bellscape & Orchestral Werning"	Robert Fripp	2:29
2.	"Larks’ Tongues in Aspic: Part One"	David Cross, Fripp, John Wetton, Bill Bruford, Jamie Muir	9:27
3.	"Neurotica"	Adrian Belew, Fripp, Tony Levin, Bruford	4:54
4.	"The Errors"	Jakko Jakszyk, Fripp, Gavin Harrison	4:54
5.	"Cirkus"	Fripp, Peter Sinfield	7:31
6.	"The Lizard Suite"	Fripp, Sinfield	11:21
7.	"Fallen Angel"	Fripp, Wetton, Richard Palmer-James	6:01
8.	"Larks’ Tongues in Aspic: Part Two"	Fripp	7:08
9.	"Islands"	Fripp, Sinfield	9:50
10.	"Pictures of a City"	Fripp, Sinfield	9:59
Total length:			73:34

Disc two
No.	Title	Writers	Length
1.	"Indiscipline"	Belew, Fripp, Levin, Bruford	8:01
2.	"The ConstruKction of Light" (Part I only)	Belew, Fripp, Trey Gunn, Pat Mastelotto	6:20
3.	"Easy Money"	Fripp, Wetton, Palmer-James	9:34
4.	"The Letters"	Fripp, Sinfield	6:37
5.	"Interlude"	Fripp	2:29
6.	"Meltdown"	Jakszyk, Fripp	4:22
7.	"Radical Action II"	Fripp	2:28
8.	"Level Five"	Belew, Fripp, Gunn, Mastelotto	7:03
9.	"Starless"	Cross, Fripp, Wetton, Bruford, Palmer-James	14:55
10.	"'Heroes'" (David Bowie cover)	David Bowie, Brian Eno	4:27
11.	"21st Century Schizoid Man"	Fripp, Ian McDonald, Greg Lake, Michael Giles, Sinfield	15:55
Total length:			82:11

Notes

- "The Court of the Crimson King" was printed on the night's setlist but was not performed.
- On the setlist, "The Errors" was titled "Radical Action III".
- This show marked the first recording of "The Errors", though it was performed throughout the American leg of the summer 2017 tour starting in Seattle.

== Personnel ==
King Crimson

- Jakko Jakszyk – guitar, flute, voice
- Robert Fripp – guitar, keyboards, liner notes
- Mel Collins – saxophone, flute
- Bill Rieflin – keyboards
- Tony Levin – bass, Chapman Stick, voice, photography
- Pat Mastelotto – drums, percussion
- Gavin Harrison – drums, percussion
- Jeremy Stacey – drums, percussion, keyboards

Additional personnel

- David Singleton – photography, liner notes, production, mastering
- Chris Porter – mixing
