= Music Is Our Friend: Live in Washington and Albany =

Live album by King Crimson
- Released: 20 November 2021
- Recorded: August 22 & September 11, 2021
- Venue: The Anthem, Washington D.C. (Disc 1 & tracks 1–5 of Disc 2) and The Egg, Albany (Disc 2, tracks 6–9)
- Genre: Progressive rock
- Length: 136:15
- Label: Discipline Global Mobile
- Producer: David Singleton

King Crimson chronology
Meltdown: Live in Mexico City (2018)	Music Is Our Friend: Live in Washington and Albany (2021)

Music Is Our Friend: Live in Washington and Albany is a live album by the English progressive rock band King Crimson released on 20 November 2021. It is an "official bootleg" of the band's final performance in North America, from September of that year, ending with four songs from the pre-tour "Friends And Family" show in Albany, NY in August. The songs played span the band's entire lifetime.

== Tour ==
The Music Is Our Friend tour was scheduled for 2020, but was postponed a full year due to the COVID-19 pandemic. The tour began in July 2021 in Florida. There was a two-week break, and multiple shows had to be moved due to extreme weather, but none were cancelled. After North America, the tour concluded with 8 dates in Japan in November and December. According to Robert Fripp, it was most likely the final tour by King Crimson and there has been no activity from them since.

== Critical reception ==
Professional ratings
Review scores
Source	Rating
All About Jazz	4.5/5 stars

Writing for All About Jazz, John Kelman enjoyed the album, stating that the band had evolved and taken old music and made it new again. He considered the release to be a large step forward for the band, highlighting all of the band members' skills as musicians.

== Track listing ==
Disc 1
No.	Title	Writer(s)	Length
1.	"Introductory Soundscape"	Robert Fripp	6:53
2.	"The Hell Hounds Of Krim"	Gavin Harrison, Pat Mastelotto, William Rieflin	3:35
3.	"Larks' Tongues in Aspic, Part I"	David Cross, Fripp, John Wetton, Bill Bruford, Jamie Muir	8:04
4.	"Pictures of a City"	Fripp, Peter Sinfield	8:35
5.	"The Court of the Crimson King"	Ian McDonald, Sinfield	9:46
6.	"Red"	Fripp	6:07
7.	"Tony Cadenza Deals It Slitheryacious-To-The-Max"	Tony Levin	1:11
8.	"Neurotica"	Adrian Belew, Fripp, Levin, Bruford	4:46
9.	"One More Red Nightmare"	Fripp, Wetton	6:09
10.	"Indiscipline"	Belew, Fripp, Levin, Bruford	9:21
Total length:			64:27

Disc 2
No.	Title	Writer(s)	Length
11.	"Epitaph"	Fripp, McDonald, Greg Lake, Michael Giles, Sinfield	9:08
12.	"Radical Action II"	Fripp	2:29
13.	"Level Five"	Belew, Fripp, Trey Gunn, Mastelotto	7:06
14.	"Starless" (12:15)"	Cross, Fripp, Wetton, Bruford, Richard Palmer-James	15:22
15.	"21st Century Schizoid Man" (12:44)"	Fripp, McDonald, Lake, Giles, Sinfield	14:48
16.	"Tony Cadenza Serves It Piping Hot"	Levin	1:19
17.	"Discipline"	Belew, Fripp, Levin, Bruford	5:08
18.	"Larks' Tongues in Aspic, Part II"	Fripp	6:53
19.	"Islands"	Fripp, Sinfield	9:09
Total length:			71:48

== Personnel ==
King Crimson

- Jakko Jakszyk – guitar, vocals
- Robert Fripp – guitar, keyboard
- Mel Collins – saxophones, flute
- Tony Levin – basses, Chapman Stick
- Pat Mastelotto – drums, percussion
- Gavin Harrison – drums, percussion
- Jeremy Stacey – drums, percussion, keyboards

== Charts ==
Chart performance for Music Is Our Friend: Live in Washington and Albany
Chart (2021)	Peak position
Scottish Albums (OCC)	59
UK Independent Albums (OCC)	19
UK Progressive Albums (OCC)	8
UK Rock & Metal Albums (OCC)	6
