= Lark's tongue =

Lark's tongue may refer to:

- Lark's tongue (chamfer), a special type of chamfer end.
- Larks' Tongues in Aspic, a 1973 album by King Crimson
  - Larks' Tongues in Aspic (instrumental), a series of pieces by that band, the first two of which appear on the album of the same name
- the tongue of a lark, which was used in ancient recipes
