= Live in Vienna (King Crimson album) =

2017 live album by King Crimson

Live album by King Crimson
- Released: 6 April 2018
- Recorded: 1 December 2016
- Venue: Museumsquartier in Vienna, Austria
- Genre: Progressive rock
- Length: 187:11
- Label: Discipline Global Mobile
- Producer: King Crimson

King Crimson chronology
Live in Chicago (2017)	Live in Vienna (2018)	Meltdown: Live in Mexico City (2018)

Live in Vienna, or Live in Vienna, December 1, 2016, is a triple-disc live album by the English progressive rock band King Crimson, originally released in a limited capacity in Japan as Live in Vienna 2016 + Live in Tokyo 2015 on 27 September 2017. The expanded album, just titled Live in Vienna, was released through Discipline Global Mobile on 6 April 2018.

== Content ==
Live in Vienna was recorded on 1 December 2016 at Museumsquartier in Vienna, Austria. The first two discs of Live in Vienna cover the entire first and second sets of the concert. The third disc on the original Japanese release was a bonus disc featuring live tracks from King Crimson's 2015 tour of Japan. On the main release, the third disc comprises one of the band's first performances of "Fracture" since 1974, two encores from the show in Vienna, and newly sequenced pieces with excerpts from Robert Fripp's soundscapes edited into them, in the style of THRaKaTTaK.

== Critical reception ==
Professional ratings
Review scores
Source	Rating
All About Jazz	4.5/5 stars

Writing for All About Jazz, John Kelman praised the album, especially the third disc's version of "Fracture" and its live improvisations, which he called "a primary reason to consider Live in Vienna an essential listen."

== Track listing ==
Disc one
No.	Title	Writers	Length
1.	"Walk On: Monk Morph Music of the Chamber"	Robert Fripp, Mel Collins, Tony Levin	2:31
2.	"The Hell Hounds of Krim"	Gavin Harrison, Pat Mastelotto, Bill Rieflin	3:39
3.	"Pictures of a City"	Fripp, Peter Sinfield	8:40
4.	"Lizard" (The Battle of Glass Tears – Part I: Dawn Song)	Fripp, Sinfield	2:19
5.	"Suitable Ground for the Blues"	Jakko Jakszyk, Fripp	4:46
6.	"VROOOM"	Adrian Belew, Fripp, Trey Gunn, Levin, Bill Bruford, Mastelotto	5:13
7.	"The ConstruKction of Light" (Part I only)	Belew, Fripp, Gunn, Mastelotto	6:37
8.	"The Court of the Crimson King"	Ian McDonald, Sinfield	7:18
9.	"The Letters"	Fripp, Sinfield	6:14
10.	"Sailor's Tale"	Fripp	6:18
11.	"Interlude"	Fripp, Collins, Levin	2:45
12.	"Radical Action II"	Fripp	2:15
13.	"Level Five"	Belew, Fripp, Gunn, Mastelotto	7:28
Total length:			66:03

Disc two
No.	Title	Writers	Length
1.	"Fairy Dust of the Drumsons"	Harrison, Mastelotto, Jeremy Stacey	1:42
2.	"Peace: An End"	Fripp, Sinfield	1:54
3.	"Cirkus"	Fripp, Sinfield	7:32
4.	"Indiscipline"	Belew, Fripp, Levin, Bruford	8:50
5.	"Epitaph"	Fripp, McDonald, Greg Lake, Michael Giles, Sinfield	8:47
6.	"Easy Money"	Fripp, John Wetton, Richard Palmer-James	10:07
7.	"The Devil Dogs of Tessellation Row"	Harrison, Mastelotto, Rieflin	3:03
8.	"Red"	Fripp	6:41
9.	"Meltdown"	Jakszyk, Fripp	4:16
10.	"Larks' Tongues in Aspic: Part Two"	Fripp	7:00
11.	"Starless"	David Cross, Fripp, Wetton, Bruford, Palmer-James	13:03
Total length:			72:55

Disc three
No.	Title	Writers	Length
1.	"'Heroes'"	David Bowie, Brian Eno	5:23
2.	"Fracture"	Fripp	10:56
3.	"21st Century Schizoid Man"	Fripp, McDonald, Lake, Giles, Sinfield	13:07
4.	"Schoenberg Softened His Hat"	Fripp, Collins, Levin, David Singleton	11:45
5.	"Ahriman's Ceaseless Corruptions"	Fripp, Collins, Levin, Singleton	6:04
6.	"Spenta's Counter Claim"	Fripp, Collins, Levin, Singleton	0:58
Total length:			48:13

Notes

- "Fracture" was performed at Falconer Salen in Copenhagen, Denmark on 23 September 2016.
- "Schoenberg Softened His Hat" is sequenced from:
  - Teatro degli Arcimboldi in Milan, Italy, 5–6 November 2016.
  - Auditorium Conciliazione in Rome, Italy, 11–12 November 2016.
  - Teatro Verdi in Florence, Italy, 8 November 2016.
- "Ahriman's Ceaseless Corruptions" is sequenced from:
  - Auditori del Fòrum in Barcelona, Spain, 24–25 November 2016.
  - Le Silo in Marseille, France on 27 November 2016.
- "Spenta's Counter Claim" is sequenced from Stadsschouwburg in Antwerp, Belgium on 2 November 2016.

Live in Japan 2015 (Japanese bonus disc; replaces disc 3)
No.	Title	Writer(s)	Recorded at	Length
1.	"Walk On: Soundscape"	Fripp	Tokyo, 7 December 2015	6:53
2.	"Larks' Tongues in Aspic: Part One"	Cross, Fripp, Wetton, Bruford, Jamie Muir	Tokyo, 7 December 2015	10:22
3.	"One More Red Nightmare"	Fripp, Wetton	Tokyo, 8 December 2015	6:15
4.	"A Scarcity of Miracles"	Jakszyk, Fripp, Collins	Tokyo, 9 December 2015	6:51
5.	"Banshee Legs Bell Hassle"	Harrison, Rieflin, Mastelotto	Tokyo, 10 December 2015	1:50
6.	"Radical Action (To Unseat the Hold of Monkey Mind)"	Fripp	Osaka, 12 December 2015	3:19
7.	"Meltdown"	Fripp, Jakszyk	Osaka, 13 December 2015	4:22
8.	"Radical Action II"	Fripp	Tokyo, 16 December 2015	2:44
9.	"Peace - An End" (First two lines sung in Japanese)	Fripp, Sinfield	Tokyo, 17 December 2015	2:08
10.	"The Talking Drum"	Bruford, Cross, Muir, Wetton, Fripp	Takamatsu, 19 December 2015	3:52
11.	"21st Century Schizoid Man"	Lake, McDonald, Giles, Sinfield, Fripp	Nagoya, 21 December 2015	11:53
12.	"Islands" (Bonus track from Live in Chicago)	Fripp, Sinfield	Chicago, 28 June 2017	9:37
Total length:				1:10:10

== Personnel ==
Credits adapted from liner notes.

King Crimson

- Jakko Jakszyk – guitar, flute, voice
- Robert Fripp – guitar, keyboard, mastering, production
- Mel Collins – saxophone, flute
- Tony Levin – bass, chapman stick, voice, photography
- Pat Mastelotto – drums, percussion
- Gavin Harrison – drums, percussion
- Jeremy Stacey – drums, percussion, keyboards (Vienna 2016 and Chicago "Islands" only)
- Bill Rieflin – drums, percussion (Japan 2015 only); keyboards (Japan 2015 and Chicago "Islands" only)

Additional personnel

- David Singleton – photography, liner notes, production, mastering
- Ben Singleton – artwork
- Chris Porter – mixing, mastering
- Alan Jones – photography
- Dave Salt – photography
- Hugh O'Donnell – layout, design

== Charts ==
Chart (2018)	Peak position
US Independent Albums (Billboard)	36
