= Radical Action to Unseat the Hold of Monkey Mind =

Box set by King Crimson
- Released: 2 September 2016
- Recorded: September–December 2015
- Venues: UK, Canada, and Japan
- Genres: Progressive rock; art rock
- Length: 161:21
- Label: DGM
- Producers: Robert Fripp and David Singleton

King Crimson chronology
| Live in Toronto (2016) | Radical Action to Unseat the Hold of Monkey Mind (2016) | Live in Chicago (2017) |

Professional ratings
Review scores
| Source | Rating |
|---|---|
| AllMusic | 4/5 stars |
| All About Jazz | 5/5 stars |

Radical Action to Unseat the Hold of Monkey Mind is a box set of live performances by the English progressive rock band King Crimson, released on 2 September 2016. It is the first full-length release by the seven member incarnation of the group which formed in 2013, and their first release of new material since 2003.

The box set was recorded during King Crimson's 2015 tours of Japan, Canada and France, mostly in Takamatsu, Japan. The material performed is mostly from the 1969–1974 period, and in most cases had rarely been performed live since the 1970s. The songs were rearranged, sometimes drastically, to suit the current line-up. Also included are some pieces from 1995 and onward, alongside new material. The title is derived from a song of the same name that the band had been playing in concert.

The set was released in two editions: a 4-disc standard edition featuring the complete concert in one Blu-ray disc and three CDs (individually themed "virtual studio albums" with no audible audience); and a 6-disc deluxe limited edition, featuring the same as the standard edition plus two DVDs with the complete concert and an expanded booklet. The Blu-ray disc has a "picture off" mode which allows listening to the music without the video.

== Track listing ==
=== Disc one, Mainly Metal ===
| No. | Title | Writers | Length |
|---|---|---|---|
| 1. | "Larks’ Tongues in Aspic: Part One" | David Cross, Robert Fripp, John Wetton, Bill Bruford, Jamie Muir | 10:36 |
| 2. | "Radical Action (to Unseat the Hold of Monkey Mind)" | Fripp | 3:40 |
| 3. | "Meltdown" | Jakko Jakszyk, Fripp | 4:22 |
| 4. | "Radical Action II" | Fripp | 2:27 |
| 5. | "Level Five" | Adrian Belew, Fripp, Trey Gunn, Pat Mastelotto | 6:46 |
| 6. | "The Light of Day" | Jakszyk, Mel Collins, Fripp | 5:49 |
| 7. | "The Hell Hounds of Krim" | Gavin Harrison, Mastelotto, Bill Rieflin | 3:36 |
| 8. | "The ConstruKction of Light" (Part I) | Belew, Fripp, Gunn, Mastelotto | 6:24 |
| 9. | "The Talking Drum" | Cross, Fripp, Wetton, Bruford, Muir | 3:48 |
| 10. | "Larks’ Tongues in Aspic: Part Two" | Fripp | 6:39 |
| Total length: | | | 54:07 |

=== Disc two, Easy Money Shots ===
| No. | Title | Writers | Length |
|---|---|---|---|
| 1. | "Peace" | Fripp, Peter Sinfield | 2:07 |
| 2. | "Pictures of a City" | Fripp, Sinfield | 8:17 |
| 3. | "Banshee Legs Bell Hassle" | Harrison, Mastelotto, Rieflin | 1:40 |
| 4. | "Easy Money" | Fripp, Wetton, Richard Palmer-James | 8:26 |
| 5. | "VROOOM" | Belew, Fripp, Gunn, Tony Levin, Bruford, Mastelotto | 4:56 |
| 6. | "Suitable Grounds for the Blues" | Jakszyk, Fripp | 4:51 |
| 7. | "Interlude" | Fripp | 2:23 |
| 8. | "The Letters" | Fripp, Sinfield | 6:30 |
| 9. | "Sailor's Tale" | Fripp | 6:41 |
| 10. | "A Scarcity of Miracles" | Jakszyk, Fripp, Collins | 6:52 |
| Total length: | | | 52:43 |

=== Disc three, Crimson Classics ===
| No. | Title | Writers | Length |
|---|---|---|---|
| 1. | "Red" | Fripp | 6:31 |
| 2. | "One More Red Nightmare" | Fripp, Wetton | 6:03 |
| 3. | "Epitaph" | Fripp, Ian McDonald, Greg Lake, Michael Giles, Sinfield | 8:44 |
| 4. | "Starless" | Cross, Fripp, Wetton, Bruford, Palmer-James | 12:17 |
| 5. | "Devil Dogs of Tessellation Row" | Harrison, Mastelotto, Rieflin | 3:00 |
| 6. | "The Court of the Crimson King" | McDonald, Sinfield | 7:00 |
| 7. | "21st Century Schizoid Man" | Fripp, McDonald, Lake, Giles, Sinfield | 10:56 |
| Total length: | | | 54:31 |

Blu-ray
| No. | Title | Length |
|---|---|---|
| 1. | "Threshold Soundscape" |
| 2. | "Larks’ Tongues in Aspic: Part One" |
| 3. | "Pictures of a City" |
| 4. | "Peace" |
| 5. | "Radical Action (to Unseat the Hold of Monkey Mind)" |
| 6. | "Meltdown" |
| 7. | "Radical Action II" |
| 8. | "Level Five" |
| 9. | "Epitaph" |
| 10. | "The Hell Hounds of Krim" |
| 11. | "The ConstruKction of Light" (Part I only) |
| 12. | "A Scarcity of Miracles" |
| 13. | "Red" |
| 14. | "Backstage Adventures of the Crimson Kind" |
| 15. | "VROOOM" |
| 16. | "Banshee Legs Bell Hassle" |
| 17. | "Easy Money" |
| 18. | "Interlude" |
| 19. | "The Letters" |
| 20. | "Sailor's Tale" |
| 21. | "The Light of Day" |
| 22. | "The Talking Drum" |
| 23. | "Larks’ Tongues in Aspic: Part Two" |
| 24. | "Starless" |
| 25. | "Devil Dogs of Tessellation Row" |
| 26. | "The Court of the Crimson King" |
| 27. | "21st Century Schizoid Man" |

Blu-ray extras
| No. | Title | Length |
|---|---|---|
| 1. | "Suitable Grounds for the Blues" |
| 2. | "One More Red Nightmare" |

DVD disc one
| No. | Title | Length |
|---|---|---|
| 1. | "Threshold Soundscape" |
| 2. | "Larks’ Tongues in Aspic: Part One" |
| 3. | "Pictures of a City" |
| 4. | "Peace" |
| 5. | "Radical Action (to Unseat the Hold of Monkey Mind)" |
| 6. | "Meltdown" |
| 7. | "Radical Action II" |
| 8. | "Level Five" |
| 9. | "Epitaph" |
| 10. | "The Hell Hounds of Krim" |
| 11. | "The ConstruKction of Light" (Part I only) |
| 12. | "A Scarcity of Miracles" |
| 13. | "Red" |

DVD disc one extras
| No. | Title | Length |
|---|---|---|
| 14. | "Suitable Grounds for the Blues" |
| 15. | "One More Red Nightmare" |

DVD disc two
| No. | Title | Length |
|---|---|---|
| 1. | "Backstage Adventures of the Crimson Kind" |
| 2. | "VROOOM" |
| 3. | "Banshee Legs Bell Hassle" |
| 4. | "Easy Money" |
| 5. | "Interlude" |
| 6. | "The Letters" |
| 7. | "Sailor's Tale" |
| 8. | "The Light of Day" |
| 9. | "The Talking Drum" |
| 10. | "Larks’ Tongues in Aspic: Part Two" |
| 11. | "Starless" |
| 12. | "Devil Dogs of Tessellation Row" |
| 13. | "The Court of the Crimson King" |
| 14. | "21st Century Schizoid Man" |

== Personnel ==
King Crimson

- Jakko Jakszyk – guitar, voice, flute, audio pre-production
- Robert Fripp – guitar, guitar synth, keyboard with sampled Mellotron, Soundscapes, production, mixing, additional footage
- Mel Collins – saxophones, flutes
- Tony Levin – basses, funk fingers, electric upright bass, Chapman Stick, backing vocals
- Pat Mastelotto – drums, electronic drums, percussion
- Gavin Harrison – drums, electronic drums, percussion, audio pre-production
- Bill Rieflin – drums, electronic drums, percussion, keyboard with sampled Mellotron

Additional personnel

- DGM – management
- David Singleton – mixing, production, video compiling, liner notes
- Chris Porter – engineering, mixing
- Alex R. Mundy – digital assembly
- Trevor Wilkins – filming, editing, booklet photography
- Sid Smith – additional footage
- Patrick Cleasby – video transfer
- Opus Productions
  - Neil Wilkes – Blu-ray disc & DVD authoring & assembly
  - Claire Bidwell – Blu-ray disc & DVD layout & design
- Bob Romano, Tim McDonnel, Alberto Fas, John Kimber, "Philly" Bob Squires, Jon Urban, Adam Blue Buckely – disc testing
- Francesca Sundsten – "Cyclops" cover painting
- Ben Singleton – additional artwork, Cyclops re-imagining
- Steve Ball – DGM logo
- Claudia Hahn – booklet photography
- Scarlet Page – photography (gatefold inner sleeve photos)
- Hugh O'Donnell – design and layout

== Charts ==
| Chart (2016) | Peak position |
|---|---|
| German Albums (Offizielle Top 100) | 100 |
| Italian Albums (FIMI) | 100 |
| Scottish Albums (Official Charts) | 38 |
| UK Albums (Official Charts) | 71 |
