= USA (King Crimson album) =

Live album by King Crimson
- Released: April 1975
- Recorded: 28, 30 June 1974
- Venues: Casino, Asbury Park, New Jersey; Palace Theatre, Providence, Rhode Island
- Genre: Progressive rock
- Length: 38:48; 67:18 (2002 reissue)
- Labels: Island; Atlantic
- Producer: King Crimson

King Crimson chronology
| Red (1974) | USA (1975) | A Young Person's Guide to King Crimson (1976) |

Professional ratings
Review scores
| Source | Rating |
|---|---|
| AllMusic | 4/5 stars |
| Christgau's Record Guide | B+ |

USA is a live album by the English progressive rock band King Crimson, released in April 1975, some seven months after this incarnation had disbanded. It was recorded at the Casino, Asbury Park, New Jersey, United States on 28 June 1974, except for "21st Century Schizoid Man", which was recorded at the Palace Theatre, Providence, Rhode Island two days later. It was recorded by George Chkiantz and David Hewitt using the Record Plant Remote Truck. Violin and electric piano overdubs were added to three tracks at Olympic Studios, London in early 1975 and Chkiantz mixed the album at Olympic with Robert Fripp and John Wetton.

The album opens with a brief excerpt of "The Heavenly Music Corporation" from (No Pussyfooting), an experimental album which Robert Fripp had recorded with musician and producer Brian Eno in 1972. While it was not listed as a separate track on the original album, it is present on all releases.

Eddie Jobson, then a member of fellow E.G. artists Roxy Music along with Wetton, performed violin overdubs on “Larks’ Tongues in Aspic (Part II)” and “21st Century Schizoid Man” and electric piano on “Lament” to improve the poor sound quality of the original parts played by David Cross, who had been fired from the group shortly after the live recordings were made.

“Asbury Park” and “Easy Money” were edited to about half their original lengths for the LP release. The unedited versions were released digitally on DGMLive.com in 2005, along with the rest of the show in its original running order.

Original vinyl releases contain audio content in both the lead-in grooves to both sides of the album, and in side two's run-out groove. In the latter case, the audience's applause following "21st Century Schizoid Man" continues through side two's final locked groove, causing the applause to continue on manual turntables as long as the phonograph needle remains on the record.

There have been four releases of the album:

1. Original vinyl release in 1975. Includes tracks 1 - 6 (although track 1 & 2 are combined) with Eddie Jobson's overdubs.
2. 30th Anniversary Remaster released 2002. Added tracks 8 & 9 to original release, credited track 1.
3. 2005 mix from the original multi-track tapes by Ronan Chris Murphy at DGM HQ. Released as download from dgmlive.com in 2005 and on CD as disc two of The Collectable King Crimson, Vol. 1 in 2006. This edition is now the full Asbury Park concert, without Jobson's overdubs, and in the proper running order. Includes all tracks, with the uncut versions of "Asbury Park" and "Easy Money"; "21st Century Schizoid Man" is moved to be the last track and is now the version from Asbury Park rather than Providence.
4. 2013 mix from the original multi-track tapes by Robert Fripp, Tony Arnold and David Singleton at the Courthouse, Cranborne, Dorset. Same track order and versions as release #3. Splits the improv at the end of "Easy Money" into its own track. This mix is available on The Road to Red and the 40th Anniversary edition of USA.

== Cover ==
The cover is a photograph by British fashion photographer and film director Willie Christie, who also photographed the cover of the Fripp & Eno (No Pussyfooting) album. The idea for the cover came from Wetton and was inspired by the Statue of Liberty.

== Track listing ==
Side one
| No. | Title | Writer(s) | Length |
|---|---|---|---|
| 1. | "Larks' Tongues in Aspic (Part II)" | Fripp | 6:45 |
| 2. | "Lament" | Fripp, Wetton, Palmer-James | 4:05 |
| 3. | "Exiles" | Cross, Fripp, Palmer-James | 7:04 |

Side two
| No. | Title | Writer(s) | Length |
|---|---|---|---|
| 4. | "Asbury Park" | Cross, Fripp, Wetton, Bruford | 6:50 |
| 5. | "Easy Money" | Fripp, Wetton, Palmer-James | 6:32 |
| 6. | "21st Century Schizoid Man" | Fripp, McDonald, Lake, Giles, Sinfield | 7:32 |

2002 CD reissue
| No. | Title | Writer(s) | Length |
|---|---|---|---|
| 1. | "Walk On... No Pussyfooting" | Fripp, Eno | 0:35 |
| 2. | "Larks' Tongues in Aspic (Part II)" | Fripp | 6:25 |
| 3. | "Lament" | Fripp, Wetton, Palmer-James | 4:22 |
| 4. | "Exiles" | Cross, Fripp, Palmer-James | 7:24 |
| 5. | "Asbury Park" | Cross, Fripp, Wetton, Bruford | 6:54 |
| 6. | "Easy Money" | Fripp, Wetton, Palmer-James | 7:12 |
| 7. | "21st Century Schizoid Man" | Fripp, McDonald, Lake, Giles, Sinfield | 8:11 |
| 8. | "Fracture" | Fripp | 11:20 |
| 9. | "Starless" | Cross, Fripp, Wetton, Bruford, Palmer-James | 14:55 |

== Personnel ==
King Crimson

- David Cross – violin, viola, Mellotron, Hohner Pianet
- Robert Fripp – electric guitar, Mellotron, Hohner Pianet
- John Wetton – bass guitar, vocals
- Bill Bruford – drums, percussion

Additional personnel

- Eddie Jobson – violin overdubs (1, 6), Hohner Pianet overdub (2) on original release only
- George Chkiantz – recording and mixing engineer
- Peter Walmsley, Chris Kettle, Tex Read, Harvey Baker & Nick Bell – road team
- Nicholas de Ville – cover design
- Willie Christie – photography
- Bob Bowkett, C.C.S. – typography
- Joe Pizzo, David Zink & Riley Jackson of Lamar University, Texas – Kirlian photograph
- Dik Fraser – special thanks

== Charts ==
| Chart (1975) | Peak position |
|---|---|
| Japanese Albums (Oricon) | 52 |
| US Billboard 200 | 125 |
