= Live in Barcelona =

Live in Barcelona may refer to:

- Live in Barcelona (Bruce Springsteen video)
- Live in Barcelona (Elton John video)
- Live in Barcelona (21st Century Schizoid Band album)
