= Pictures of a City – Live in New York =

Official Bootleg Volume Four: Pictures of a City – Live in New York

Live album by 21st Century Schizoid Band
- Released: 2006
- Recorded: 27 April, 2004
- Venue: B.B. King Blues Club, New York City, U.S.A.
- Genre: Progressive rock
- Label: Iceni

21st Century Schizoid Band chronology
Live in Italy (2003)	Official Bootleg Volume Four: Pictures of a City – Live in New York (2006)	Live in Barcelona (2024)

Pictures of a City – Live in New York is the fourth installment of the "Official Bootleg" series from the 21st Century Schizoid Band. It is their second album to feature drummer Ian Wallace, who replaced Michael Giles the previous year.

== Track listing ==
=== Disc 1 ===
1. "Pictures of a City" (Robert Fripp, Peter Sinfield) – 8:34
2. "Cat Food" (Fripp, McDonald, Sinfied) – 4:24
3. "Let There Be Light" (McDonald, Sinfield) – 3:38
4. "Cirkus" (Fripp, Sinfield) – 8:16
5. "Spend Us Three" (Collins) – 1:44
6. "Cadence and Cascade" (Fripp, Sinfield) – 3:47
7. "The Court of the Crimson King" (McDonald, Sinfield) – 8:45
8. "Ladies of the Road" (Fripp, Sinfield) – 8:17
9. "Catley's Ashes" (Jakszyk) – 8:52
10. "Formentera Lady" (Fripp, Sinfield) – 9:50
11. "Sailor's Tale" (Fripp) – 6:02

=== Disc 2 ===
1. "I Talk to the Wind" (McDonald, Sinfield) – 6:59
2. "Epitaph" (Fripp, McDonald, Lake, Giles, Sinfield) – 10:00
3. "21st Century Schizoid Man" (Fripp, McDonald, Lake, Giles, Sinfield) – 11:58
4. "Starless" (Cross, Fripp, Wetton, Bruford, Palmer-James) – 11:30

== Personnel ==
- Mel Collins – baritone, tenor and alto sax, flute, keyboards and backing vocals
- Peter Giles – bass guitar and backing vocals
- Jakko M. Jakszyk – guitar, lead vocals, flute and keyboards
- Ian McDonald – alto sax, flute, keyboards and vocals
- Ian Wallace – drums, percussion and backing vocals
