= Live at the Orpheum =

Live album by King Crimson
- Released: 13 January 2015
- Recorded: 30 September–1 October 2014
- Genre: Progressive rock
- Length: 40:56
- Label: Discipline Global Mobile
- Producer: King Crimson

King Crimson chronology
The Elements of King Crimson (2014)	Live at the Orpheum (2015)	Live in Toronto (2016)

Professional ratings
Aggregate scores
Source	Rating
Metacritic	75/100
Review scores
Source	Rating
AllMusic	4/5 stars
All About Jazz	5/5 stars
PopMatters	7/10 stars

Live at the Orpheum is a live album by the English progressive rock band King Crimson, released by Discipline Global Mobile records in 2015. The album was recorded on 30 September and 1 October at the Orpheum Theatre in Los Angeles, California on the band's The Elements of King Crimson US tour of 2014.

King Crimson's 2014 tour marked guitarist, founder and leader Robert Fripp's return to active service after a long legal battle with Universal Music Group. This line-up of King Crimson is notable for featuring three drummers, Pat Mastelloto, Gavin Harrison and Bill Rieflin. The other members of the band are long standing bass player Tony Levin, Mel Collins who was previously in the band from 1970 to 1972, also playing on Red in 1974, Jakko Jakszyk on guitar and vocals, and Robert Fripp.

All the shows on the tour were recorded on multitrack with Jakko Jakszyk sorting through the recordings. The two shows at the Orpheum Theatre in Los Angeles were chosen for release. The album features 41 minutes of selections from the set and was released on 13 January 2015 on CD/DVD-A and heavy-weight vinyl.

== Track listing ==
No.	Title	Writers	Length
1.	"Walk On: Monk Morph Chamber Music"	Mel Collins, Robert Fripp, Tony Levin	2:34
2.	"One More Red Nightmare"	Fripp, John Wetton	6:07
3.	"Banshee Legs Bell Hassle"	Gavin Harrison	1:40
4.	"The ConstruKction of Light"	Adrian Belew, Fripp, Trey Gunn, Pat Mastelotto	6:32
5.	"The Letters"	Fripp, Peter Sinfield	4:57
6.	"Sailor's Tale"	Fripp	6:51
7.	"Starless"	David Cross, Fripp, Wetton, Bill Bruford, Richard Palmer-James	12:15

Other songs performed through the two shows but not included in either release: "Larks' Tongues in Aspic, Parts One and Two" (Cross, Fripp, Wetton, Bruford, Jamie Muir; Fripp), "VROOOM/Coda: Marine 475" (Belew, Fripp, Gunn, Levin, Bruford, Mastelotto), "A Scarcity of Miracles" (Jakko Jakszyk, Fripp, Collins), "Pictures of a City" (Fripp, Sinfield), "Level Five" (Fripp, Belew, Gunn, Mastelotto), "Red" (Fripp), "The Talking Drum" (Cross, Fripp, Wetton, Bruford, Muir), "Hell Hounds of Krim" (Mastelotto, Harrison, Bill Rieflin), "21st Century Schizoid Man" ( Fripp, Ian McDonald, Greg Lake, Michael Giles, Sinfield), and "The Light of Day" (Jakszyk, Fripp, Collins).

== Personnel ==
King Crimson

Front Line

- Pat Mastelotto – drums, electronic drums, percussion
- Bill Rieflin – drums, electronic drums, percussion, keyboards, backing vocals
- Gavin Harrison – drums, percussion, mixing

Back Line

- Mel Collins – saxophones, flutes
- Tony Levin – basses, electric upright bass, Chapman Stick, funk fingers, backing vocals, photography (cover and road photos)
- Jakko Jakszyk – guitar, lead vocals, mixing, production engineering
- Robert Fripp – guitar, guitar synth, keyboard, Soundscapes, mixing

Production personnel

- Mark Vreeken – live recording engineer
- John Dent (Live Mastering) – mastering (vinyl version)
- Neil Wilkes (Opus Productions) – DVD authoring (CD/DVD-A version)
- Scarlet Page – photography (back cover photo)
- Ben Singleton – "Elements" logos
- Hugh O'Donnell – design and layout

== Charts ==
Chart (2015)	Peak position
US Indie Store Album Sales (Billboard)	25
US Independent Albums (Billboard)	28
US Top Rock Albums (Billboard)	39
