= Lizard (song) =

- UK side two label

Song by King Crimson

from the album Lizard
- Released: December 11, 1970
- Recorded: September 1970
- Studio: Wessex, London
- Genre: Progressive rock
- Length: 23:15
- Label: Island
- Composer: Robert Fripp
- Lyricist: Peter Sinfield
- Producers: Robert Fripp; Peter Sinfield

"Lizard" is a song by the British progressive rock band King Crimson and the closing track to the album of the same name, released in 1970. Composed by Robert Fripp with lyrics by Peter Sinfield, the song features heavy jazz and classical influences, telling the story of a medieval battle. It is structured as a four-part suite and takes up the entire second side of the album. At 23 minutes and 15 seconds long, it is the longest song in the band's discography. In 2011, PopMatters ranked it the 13th best progressive rock song of all time.

== Background ==
"Lizard" was recorded during a turbulent period in King Crimson's history. After the recording of In the Wake of Poseidon concluded in April 1970, lead vocalist Greg Lake departed the band to form Emerson, Lake & Palmer, as did brothers Michael and Peter Giles, who left to pursue a short-lived collaboration with former King Crimson member Ian McDonald. Replacing them were vocalist and bassist Gordon Haskell and drummer Andy McCulloch, who joined returning members Robert Fripp, Mel Collins, and Peter Sinfield. This lineup was supplemented by a number of session musicians, including pianist Keith Tippett, oboist Robin Miller, cornetist Mark Charig, and trombonist Nick Evans. Jon Anderson of Yes was brought on to provide guest vocals, as his part was thought to be out of Haskell's vocal range.

While many passages were largely improvised, the writing process and overall creative direction were dominated by Fripp and Sinfield, and the recording process was acrimonious. Haskell and McCulloch were particularly dissatisfied, disliking both the music and Fripp's domineering attitude. The band's new lineup did not prove enduring. It did not perform live, and Lizard went on to be Haskell and McCulloch's only album with the band.

== Composition ==
"Lizard" is highly experimental, with considerable jazz and classical influences. Taking up the entire second side of the album, the full suite is 23 minutes and 15 seconds long, the longest song in the band's discography. It is structured as a four-part suite, comprising "Prince Rupert Awakes" (0:00–4:34), "Bolero – The Peacock's Tale" (4:34–11:06), "The Battle of Glass Tears" (11:06–22:07), and "Big Top" (22:07–23:15).

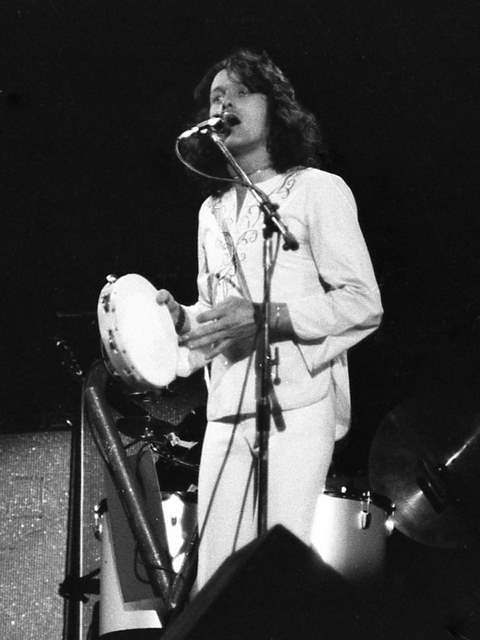
Jon Anderson, pictured here in 1973, contributed guest vocals on the first part of "Lizard".

"Prince Rupert Awakes" opens with Anderson's guest vocals, a "feint toward the light and airy," and maintains a pastoral tone. "Bolero – The Peacock's Tale" takes on a more jazz-infused style, akin to Miles Davis' Sketches of Spain, and alludes to Maurice Ravel's Boléro. The section foregrounds wind players Collins, Miller, Charig, and Evans alongside Tippett's erratic piano and McCulloch's consistent snare beat. While the second movement adapts and transforms much of the melody of the first movement in a different style, this melody is abandoned in the latter two movements. "The Battle of Glass Tears" is divided into three subsections: "Dawn Song," showcasing Haskell's vocals; the "howling maelstrom" of "Last Skirmish"; and "Prince Rupert's Lament," featuring sustained guitar notes from Fripp that "cut through the funereal aftermath" of the prior section. "Big Top" concludes the suite by reusing and intensifying themes from "Cirkus," the album's opening track, suggesting that its throughlines are cyclical in nature.

== Lyrics ==
"Lizard" tells the story of Prince Rupert, a fictionalized version of the historical Prince Rupert of the Rhine, and the "Battle of Glass Tears", a reference to both the Battle of Naseby and the Prince Rupert's drop. The suite's story is visually depicted on the album's rear cover art, commissioned by Sinfield and created by Gini Barris, which consists of the word "King" in medieval historiated lettering (the front cover art consisting of the word "Crimson").

== Live performances ==
The King Crimson lineup that created Lizard never performed live, and while the lineup that created their next album (1971's Islands) performed some tracks from Lizard live, including "Cirkus" and "Lady of the Dancing Water," it never played any portion of the title suite. The band first played part of the "Lizard" suite live during their 2016 European tour, debuting "Dawn Song" (the first section of "The Battle of Glass Tears") at the Aylesbury Waterside Theatre in September. The band debuted "The Battle of Glass Tears" in full during their 2017 North American tour, and they debuted "Bolero – The Peacock's Tale," the suite's second section, during their 2018 European tour. Portions of "Lizard" have been released on live albums recorded during these tours, including Live in Chicago, Live in Vienna, and Meltdown: Live in Mexico City.

== Reception ==
In 2011, Sean Murphy of PopMatters ranked "Lizard" the 13th best progressive rock song of all time, opining "nothing like this exists on any other record from any other genre. It is a seamless integration of jazz, classical and rock, the sum total making complete sense once you accept it on its own terms." Writing for AllMusic, Dave Lynch appraised the suite as the highlight of its eponymous album.

== Personnel ==
- Robert Fripp – electric guitar, Mellotron, Hohner Pianet
- Mel Collins – saxophone, flute
- Gordon Haskell – bass guitar, vocals
- Andy McCulloch – drums
- Peter Sinfield – lyrics

with:

- Keith Tippett – piano
- Robin Miller – oboe, English horn
- Mark Charig – cornet
- Nick Evans – trombone
- Jon Anderson – vocals
