= Live in Barcelona (21st Century Schizoid Band album) =

Official Bootleg Volume Five: Live in Barcelona

Live album by 21st Century Schizoid Band
- Released: 2024
- Recorded: 20 October, 2003
- Venue: Sala Luz de Gas, Barcelona, Spain
- Genre: Progressive Rock
- Label: Cleopatra

21st Century Schizoid Band chronology
Pictures of a City – Live in New York (2006)	Official Bootleg Volume Five: Live in Barcelona (2024)

Live in Barcelona is the fifth installment of the "Official Bootleg" series from the 21st Century Schizoid Band. It features the band's second lineup, with drummer Ian Wallace, in October 2003.

== Track listing ==
=== Disc 1 ===
1. "Schizoid Intro" (Jakszyk) – 2:07
2. "A Man, A City" (Robert Fripp, Ian McDonald, Greg Lake, Michael Giles, Peter Sinfield) – 8:34
3. "Cat Food" (Fripp, McDonald, Sinfied) – 5:27
4. "Let There Be Light" (McDonald, Sinfield) – 3:49
5. "Cirkus" (Fripp, Sinfield) – 8:14
6. "Spend Us Three" (Collins) – 1:56
7. "Cadence and Cascade" (Fripp, Sinfield) – 3:37
8. "The Court of the Crimson King" (McDonald, Sinfield) – 8:49
9. "Ladies of the Road" (Fripp, Sinfield) – 7:11
10. "Catley's Ashes" (Jakszyk) – 8:12

=== Disc 2 ===
1. "Formentera Lady" (Fripp, Sinfield) – 12:28
2. "Sailor's Tale" (Fripp) – 7:07
3. "I Talk to the Wind" (McDonald, Sinfield) – 7:07
4. "Epitaph" (Fripp, McDonald, Lake, Giles, Sinfield) – 5:07
5. "21st Century Schizoid Man" (Fripp, McDonald, Lake, Giles, Sinfield) – 11:33
6. "Starless" (Cross, Fripp, Wetton, Bruford, Palmer-James) – 11:58

== Personnel ==
- Mel Collins – baritone, tenor and alto sax, flute, keyboards and backing vocals
- Peter Giles – bass guitar and backing vocals
- Jakko M. Jakszyk – guitar, lead vocals, flute and keyboards
- Ian McDonald – alto sax, flute, keyboards and vocals
- Ian Wallace – drums, percussion and backing vocals
