= Lizard (album) =

Studio album by King Crimson
- Released: 11 December 1970
- Recorded: September 1970 (Note: The exact recording dates of the songs on the album are not in the session notes; the dates given in the posts are tentative and based on estimates on when they were recorded.)
- Studios: Wessex, London
- Genres: Progressive rock; avant-garde jazz
- Length: 42:30
- Labels: Island; Atlantic
- Producers: Robert Fripp; Peter Sinfield

King Crimson chronology
In the Wake of Poseidon (1970)	Lizard (1970)	Islands (1971)

Lizard is the third studio album by English progressive rock band King Crimson, released on 11 December 1970 by Island Records in the United Kingdom, and in January 1971 by Atlantic Records in the United States and Canada. It was the second consecutive King Crimson album recorded by a line-up of the group that ultimately never played any live shows, following In the Wake of Poseidon. Lizard was written and produced by the band's two remaining original members, guitarist Robert Fripp and lyricist Peter Sinfield. It was the band's second album with saxophonist/flautist Mel Collins and the only with vocalist/bass guitarist Gordon Haskell (besides having sung one song on the previous album) and drummer Andy McCulloch.

== Background and production ==
King Crimson's previous album, In the Wake of Poseidon, had been recorded by a fluctuating line-up. Gordon Haskell was previously a classmate of guitarist Robert Fripp at Queen Elizabeth's grammar school in Wimborne near Bournemouth, the pair having subsequently played together in the local band The League of Gentlemen. Haskell provided the lead vocal on the track "Cadence and Cascade" on In the Wake of Poseidon, after Greg Lake left the band during the sessions to join Emerson, Lake & Palmer. Fripp asked Haskell to become King Crimson's full-time vocalist and bass guitarist shortly after the album was released. Another In the Wake of Poseidon musician, saxophonist/flautist Mel Collins, was also asked to continue with the band full-time, while new member Andy McCulloch replaced Michael Giles on drums. The group was augmented with session musicians for the recording of Lizard, including another In the Wake of Poseidon alumnus, the noted jazz pianist Keith Tippett, together with Yes vocalist Jon Anderson, and brass/woodwind players Robin Miller, Mark Charig, and Nick Evans.

"At the end of one song, 'Indoor Games', I just burst out laughing. You can hear it on the album. They thought it was really freaky, that I'd understood the lyrics and my part - but the truth of the matter is, it was a lousy song, the lyrics were ludicrous and my singing was atrocious so I just burst out laughing. And they thought it was wonderful!"

— Gordon Haskell, critical of the album in a 1991 interview

Haskell and McCulloch had an unhappy experience recording Lizard, finding it difficult to connect with the material, especially Haskell as a devotee of soul and Motown music. In later years, Haskell charged that Fripp "bullied us all"—even pushing McCulloch to the point of tears—and summarized his experience in the band as "24 hours of listening to bullshit hailed as 'art'". During rehearsals for a prospective tour following the album's completion, Haskell left King Crimson. He sought legal redress for the next 19 years because he believed he had been cheated out of royalties owed him for the album. Shortly after Haskell left the group, McCulloch did likewise. The press release drafted by lyricist Peter Sinfield to promote Lizard wryly quoted Max Ehrmann's poem "Desiderata", which contains advice on how to chart a true course through confusion.

Collins, on the other hand, remained in King Crimson with Fripp and Sinfield for the recording of the group's next album, Islands. Haskell was replaced with Boz Burrell on bass guitar and vocals, while McCulloch was replaced with his sometime housemate Ian Wallace. The Islands line-up of the group would finally give some of the Lizard material a live airing, with "Cirkus" and "Lady of the Dancing Water" becoming part of King Crimson's touring repertoire. "Cirkus" would also later become part of the touring repertoire of the 21st Century Schizoid Band, whose members included Mel Collins and Jakko Jakszyk.

In 2016, for the band's biggest European tour since 1974, "Cirkus" was included in the repertoire, as well as "Dawn Song", which is part of the "Lizard" suite and was played live for the first time ever. For the 2017 North American tour, "Dawn Song" was expanded to the entire "Battle of Glass Tears" section (adding "Last Skirmish" and "Prince Rupert's Lament", neither of which had ever been performed live). The "Bolero" section was added to the live repertoire for the band's 2018 European tour.

== Album cover ==
Lizard's outside cover art is by Gini Barris, who was commissioned to produce it by Peter Sinfield. The inside cover consists of the song lyrics and credits printed over a marbled pattern, credited to Koraz Wallpapers, a company run by Barris' boyfriend at the time.

The album's outside cover consists of the words 'King Crimson' spelled out in ornate medieval illuminated or historiated lettering, the word 'King' on the back cover and the word 'Crimson' on the front cover, with each letter incorporating one or two discrete images. These images in turn represent Sinfield's lyrics from the album – the images in the word 'King' representing the lyrics of the various sections and subsections of track 5, "Lizard"; while the images in the word 'Crimson' represent the lyrics of tracks 1–4. Whereas the images representing "Lizard" are medieval in content – depicting Prince Rupert, his environs (including a peacock), and the Battle of Glass Tears – the images representing the other four tracks juxtapose medieval and contemporary scenes. The image around the letter 'i' in 'Crimson', for example, depicts the Beatles, corresponding with their pseudonymous appearance in the lyrics to "Happy Family". Around the "n" on the front cover, there is a depiction of children's comic character Rupert the Bear piloting a yellow aeroplane. Another notable feature below the letter "n" depicts a trio of Ginger Baker (ex-drummer from the power trio Cream), Jimi Hendrix, and Barris' partner Dave Wade.

In his book Prog Rock FAQ, Will Romano called Barris' work "one of the era's most beautifully strange pieces of album cover artwork". In an interview with Romano, Barris said that Lizard was "one of my first jobs" since studying graphics at the Central School of Art and Design in London. She contacted Sinfield after hearing he needed an artist to produce a cover for Lizard. When she suggested creating medieval miniatures, a passion of hers, Sinfield "went for it" and commissioned her to do the job. Barris recalled that she did not hear the music until after the album's release, but worked from the lyrics Sinfield had given her. She cited the Lindisfarne Gospel and Très Riches Heures du Duc de Berry illuminated manuscripts as inspiration for her work.

== Release ==
Released on 11 December 1970 by Island Records (catalog no. ILPS 9141), Lizard reached number 29 in the UK Albums Chart. The album was released in the United States and Canada by Atlantic Records in January 1971 (catalog no. SD 8278), where it would reach number 113 in Billboard. Lizard was released by Atlantic at the same time as two other albums on the label featuring ex-King Crimson members: Emerson, Lake & Palmer's debut album (featuring Greg Lake), and the lone release by Ian McDonald and Michael Giles.

The album had CD releases in 1989 and 2001, each newly remastered by Fripp at the time. A new version was released in October 2009, containing a 5.1 Surround Sound mix on DVD-Audio, created by British musician and producer Steven Wilson in collaboration with Fripp, as well as a new stereo mix based on the surround one. In 2025 a CD/Blu-Ray edition was issued containing new stereo mixes of the album, Atmos and 5.1 mixes, instrumental and elemental remixes alongside extensive recording session reels.

== Reception ==
Professional ratings
Review scores
Source	Rating
AllMusic	4.5/5 stars
Christgau's Record Guide	B−
Classic Rock	8/10 stars
MusicHound	2.5/5

Since the album's sound is more jazz-inflected than much of the band's other work and many of its tracks idiosyncratic and experimental in nature, responses towards the album have been varied since its release. Music critic Robert Christgau rated the album a B−, saying that the "jazziness" of the album projected a "certain cerebral majesty" but criticized Peter Sinfield's lyrics, qualifying them as "overwrought".

In his retrospective review, AllMusic's Dave Lynch described it as, "Seamlessly blending rock, jazz, and classical in a way that few albums have successfully achieved, Lizard is epic, intimate, cacophonic, and subtle by turn – and infused with the dark moods first heard when "21st Century Schizoid Man" and "Epitaph" reached listeners' ears the previous year." Classic Rock reviewer described Lizard as "a decidedly Miles Davis-influenced hodgepodge of classical and jazz influences brought to their logical, near-chaotic end" and defined its music "mind-bending, unclassifiable creative stuff."

Robert Fripp has been very critical of the album since its release, calling it "unlistenable" and lovers of it as "very strange". However, he revised his opinion upon listening to Steven Wilson's surround-sound mix of the album for the 40th anniversary reissue, proclaiming, "For the first time I have heard the Music in the music."

In 2011, PopMatters listed the title track at number 13 in their list "The 25 Best Progressive Rock Songs of All Time."

== Track listing ==
All lyrics are written by Peter Sinfield; all music is composed by Robert Fripp.

Side one
No.	Title	Length
1.	"Cirkus" (including "Entry of the Chameleons")	6:27
2.	"Indoor Games"	5:37
3.	"Happy Family"	4:22
4.	"Lady of the Dancing Water"	2:47

Side two
No.	Title	Length
1.	"Lizard" a. "Prince Rupert Awakes" (4:32) b. "Bolero – The Peacock's Tale" (6:32) c. "The Battle of Glass Tears" (11:05) I. "Dawn Song" II. "Last Skirmish" III. "Prince Rupert's Lament" d. "Big Top" (1:18)	23:25

== Personnel ==
- Robert Fripp – guitar, Mellotron, electric keyboards, devices
- Mel Collins – saxophone, flute
- Gordon Haskell – bass guitar, vocals
- Andy McCulloch – drums
- Peter Sinfield – words, pictures

With:

- Robin Miller – oboe, English horn
- Mark Charig – cornet
- Nick Evans – trombone
- Keith Tippett – acoustic and electric pianos
- Jon Anderson of Yes – vocals on "Prince Rupert Awakes"

Technical

- Robin Thompson – recording engineer
- Geoff Workman – tapes

Artwork

- Peter Sinfield – sleeve conception
- Gini Barris – outside painting
- Koraz Wallpapers – inside marbling
- C.C.S. – typography

Production

- Robert Fripp – producer
- Peter Sinfield – producer

== Charts ==
Chart (1970–71)	Peak position
Australian Albums (Kent Music Report)	19
Canada Top Albums/CDs (RPM)	60
UK Albums (Official Charts)	26
US Billboard 200	113
