= Larks' Tongues in Aspic =

Studio album by King Crimson
- Released: 23 March 1973
- Recorded: January and February 1973
- Studios: Command, London
- Genres: Progressive rock; avant-garde metal; free improvisation
- Length: 46:36
- Labels: Island; Atlantic
- Producer: King Crimson

King Crimson chronology
Earthbound (1972)	Larks' Tongues in Aspic (1973)	Starless and Bible Black (1974)

King Crimson studio chronology
Islands (1971)	Larks' Tongues in Aspic (1973)	Starless and Bible Black (1974)

Larks' Tongues in Aspic is the fifth studio album by the English progressive rock band King Crimson, released on 23 March 1973 through Island Records in the UK and Atlantic Records in the United States and Canada. It marked the debut of a new incarnation of King Crimson, featuring co-founder and guitarist Robert Fripp along with four new members: bass guitarist and vocalist John Wetton, violinist and keyboardist David Cross, drummer Bill Bruford, and percussionist Jamie Muir. It is a key album in the band's evolution, drawing on Eastern European modernist classical music and free improvisation as central influences.

== Background ==
At the end of the tour to promote King Crimson's previous album, Islands, Fripp parted company with the three other members of the band (Mel Collins, Boz Burrell and Ian Wallace). Collins has stated that he was asked to stay on with the new lineup of the band but decided not to. The previous year had also seen the ousting of the band's lyricist and artistic co-director Peter Sinfield. Fripp had cited a developing musical and sometimes personal incompatibility with the other members. He was now writing starker music drawing on influences such as Béla Bartók, Igor Stravinsky, Jimi Hendrix and free improvisation.

In order to pursue these ideas, Fripp first recruited bass guitarist and vocalist John Wetton, a longstanding friend of the band who had lobbied to join at least once before but had joined Family in the meantime. The second recruit was Jamie Muir, a free-improvising percussionist who had previously been performing in the Music Improvisation Company with Derek Bailey and Evan Parker, as well as in Sunship (with Alan Gowen and Allan Holdsworth) and Boris (with Don Weller and Jimmy Roche, both later of jazz-rock band Major Surgery). Muir occasionally played a conventional drum kit, but more often used a range of small percussion instruments.

On drums, Fripp recruited Bill Bruford of Yes. Another longstanding King Crimson admirer, Bruford felt that he had done all he could with Yes at that point. He was keen to leave the band before they embarked on their Close to the Edge tour, believing that the experimentation-oriented King Crimson would be a more expansive outlet for his musical ideas. The final member of the new band was David Cross, a violinist, keyboardist and occasional flute player.

== Production ==
Larks' Tongues in Aspic showed several significant changes in King Crimson's sound. Having previously relied on woodwinds as significant melodic and textural instruments, the band now replaced them with Cross' violin. Muir's percussion rig featured eccentric instrumentation including chimes, bells, mbira, musical saw, shakers, rattles, found objects (such as sheet metal, toys and baking trays), an autoharp, and miscellaneous drums and chains. The Mellotron, a staple part of King Crimson's instrumentation since their debut album, was retained for this new phase, played by Fripp and Cross; both also played the Hohner Pianet electric piano. The instrumental pieces carried strong jazz fusion and European free-improvisation influences, and some aggressive portions verging on heavy metal.

Wetton and Muir played additional violin and trombone respectively on occasion at early gigs; Wetton and Cross contributed additional piano and flute respectively to the track "Exiles". As Muir left the group in February 1973, shortly after the album was completed and before they could embark on a supporting tour, Larks' Tongues in Aspic would be the only King Crimson album to feature this lineup.

"Easy Money" was composed piecemeal, with Fripp writing the verses and Wetton later adding the chorus.

The album title came from Muir, who thought that it aptly described the music. "It may or may not be an actual dish available at your neighborhood delicatessen," Fripp stated, "but what it means to me is something precious which is stuck, but visible. Something precious, which is encased in form."

The album spawned the concert staple "Exiles", whose Mellotron introduction had been adapted from an instrumental piece called "Mantra" which the band's original lineup had performed throughout 1969. At that time, as well as in late 1972, the melody was played by Fripp on guitar. In addition, a section of "Larks' Tongues in Aspic, Part One" was reworked from a piece entitled "A Peacemaking Stint Unrolls", which was recorded by the Islands-era band and released in 2010 as a bonus track on that album's 40th anniversary edition.

== Release and reissues ==
The album peaked at number 20 on the UK Albums Chart and at number 61 on the US Billboard album chart. In 2012 Larks' Tongues in Aspic was issued as part of the King Crimson 40th Anniversary Series, including the release of an expansive box set subtitled "The Complete Recordings". This CD, DVD-A and Blu-ray set includes every available recording of the short-lived five-man line-up, through live performances and studio sessions.

== Critical reception ==
Professional ratings
Review scores
Source	Rating
All About Jazz	5/5 stars
AllMusic	4.5/5 stars
Christgau's Record Guide	B−
Encyclopedia of Popular Music	4/5 stars
The Great Rock Discography	8/10
Mojo	4/5 stars
MusicHound	3.5/5 stars
Record Collector	4/5 stars
The Rolling Stone Album Guide	5/5 stars

In his contemporary review, Alan Niester of Rolling Stone gave a mixed assessment of the album: "You can't dance to it, can't keep a beat to it, and it doesn't even make good background music for washing the dishes," recommending listeners to "approach it with a completely open mind." He described the songs on the album as "a total study in contrasts, especially in moods and tempos – blazing and electric one moment, soft and intricate the next." While not fully appreciative of the music on the record, he complimented the violin playing as "tasteful [...] in the best classical tradition."

Billboard said that Larks' Tongues in Aspic was "without doubt the finest set yet" from King Crimson, adding "though it is spacey, it is tasteful and well arranged."

Bill Martin wrote in 1998, "[f]or sheer formal inventiveness, the most important progressive rock record of 1973 was... Larks' Tongues in Aspic", adding that listening to this album and Yes's Close to the Edge would demonstrate "what progressive rock is all about".

AllMusic's retrospective review was resoundingly positive, marking every aspect of the band's transition from a jazz-influenced vein to a more experimental one as a complete success. It deemed John Wetton "the group's strongest singer/bassist since Greg Lake's departure," and gave special praise to the remastered edition.

Robert Christgau's retrospective review gave a more ambivalent view, saying of the band's instrumental work: "not only doesn't it cook, which figures, it doesn't quite jell either."

== Legacy ==
In the Q & Mojo Classic Special Edition Pink Floyd & The Story of Prog Rock, the album was ranked number 22 on its list of "40 Cosmic Rock Albums". Rolling Stone ranked Larks' Tongues in Aspic at number 20 in its "50 Greatest Prog Rock Albums of All Time" list. The album is also featured in the book 1001 Albums You Must Hear Before You Die.

The progressive metal bands Dream Theater and Murmur have both covered "Larks' Tongues in Aspic, Part Two". Dream Theater's version is featured on the special edition of their album Black Clouds & Silver Linings.

== Track listing ==
Side one
No.	Title	Writer(s)	Length
1.	"Larks' Tongues in Aspic, Part One" (instrumental)	David Cross; Robert Fripp; John Wetton; Bill Bruford; Jamie Muir	13:36
2.	"Book of Saturday"	Fripp; Wetton; Richard Palmer-James	2:53
3.	"Exiles"	Cross; Fripp; Palmer-James	7:40
Total length:			24:09

Side two
No.	Title	Writer(s)	Length
1.	"Easy Money"	Fripp; Wetton; Palmer-James	7:54
2.	"The Talking Drum" (instrumental)	Cross; Fripp; Wetton; Bruford; Muir	7:26
3.	"Larks' Tongues in Aspic, Part Two" (instrumental)	Fripp	7:07
Total length:			22:27

== Personnel ==
King Crimson

- Robert Fripp – electric guitar, acoustic guitar (3), Mellotron, Hohner Pianet, devices, production
- John Wetton – bass guitar, vocals, piano (3), production
- David Cross – violin, viola, Mellotron, Hohner Pianet, flute (3), production
- Bill Bruford – drums, production
- Jamie Muir – percussion, drums, "allsorts" (assorted found items and sundry instruments), autoharp (1), production

Additional personnel

- Nick Ryan – recording engineer
- Tantra Designs – cover design
- Kettle, Simmons & Walmsley – equipment

== Charts ==
Chart (1973)	Peak position
Canada Top Albums/CDs (RPM)	56
Finnish Albums (The Official Finnish Charts)	15
Italian Albums (Musica e Dischi)	8
Japanese Albums (Oricon)	26
UK Albums (Official Charts)	20
US Billboard 200	61

Chart (2012)	Peak position
UK Independent Albums (Official Charts)	35
UK Rock & Metal Albums (Official Charts)	19

== Sources ==
- Hoffmann, Frank (2004). Encyclopedia of Recorded Sound. Routledge. ISBN 978-1-135-94950-1.
