= The Court of the Crimson King =

- French picture sleeve

Single by King Crimson

from the album In the Court of the Crimson King
- A-side: "The Court of the Crimson King, Pt. 1"
- B-side: "The Court of the Crimson King, Pt. 2"
- Released: October 1969 (UK) December 1969 (US)
- Recorded: 21–23 July 1969
- Studio: Wessex, London
- Genre: Progressive rock
- Length: 9:25 (album version); 7:16 (edited version); 3:22 (single version, Part One); 4:30 (single version, Part Two); 10:00 (album version with Hidden Track)
- Label: Island (UK WIP-6071); Atlantic (US 2703)
- Composer: Ian McDonald
- Lyricist: Peter Sinfield
- Producer: King Crimson

King Crimson singles chronology
| "The Court of the Crimson King" (1969) | "Cat Food" (1970) |

"The Court of the Crimson King", sometimes billed "In the Court of the Crimson King", is the titular fifth and final track from the British progressive rock band King Crimson's debut album, In the Court of the Crimson King. Released as a single, it reached No. 80 on the Billboard Hot 100 chart, the only King Crimson single to chart on the Hot 100.

== Background ==
The track was developed over the course of three days and is dominated by a distinctive, repeated four-bar riff performed on a Mellotron. The main part of the song is split into four stanzas, divided by an instrumental section called "The Return of the Fire Witch". The song climaxes at seven minutes, but after a pause continues with a brief instrumental interlude called "The Dance of the Puppets", before ending with a reprise of the main theme. The music was composed by Ian McDonald, and the lyrics were written by Peter Sinfield.

Cashbox said "Unusual lyric imagery and instrumental impact with a 'Jude' hypnotism should set the side on a breakout path." Record World called it "a heavy hard rock item with some classy jazz overtones." Billboard characterised the song as a "driving blues ballad" with a "top vocal workout".

== Track listing ==
7" single
| No. | Title | Length |
|---|---|---|
| 1. | "The Court of the Crimson King, Part 1" | 3:22 |
| 2. | "The Court of the Crimson King, Part 2" | 4:30 |

US promotional 7" single
| No. | Title | Length |
|---|---|---|
| 1. | "The Court of the Crimson King, Part 1" (Short Version) | 2:18 |
| 2. | "The Court of the Crimson King, Part 1" (Long Version) | 3:22 |

== Personnel ==
- Robert Fripp – guitars
- Ian McDonald – Mellotron, flute, reed organ, harpsichord, backing vocals
- Greg Lake – bass guitar, lead and backing vocals
- Michael Giles – drums, percussion, backing vocals
- Peter Sinfield – lyrics

== Chart performance ==
| Chart (1970) | Peak position |
|---|---|
| US Billboard Hot 100 | 80 |
