= Larks' Tongues in Aspic (instrumental) =

Suite of music by King Crimson, 1973–2003

- Promotional artwork for "Larks' Tongues in Aspic, Part Two"

Composition by King Crimson

from the album: Larks' Tongues in Aspic; Three of a Perfect Pair; The Construkction of Light; The Power to Believe
- Released: 23 March 1973 (parts I and II); 27 March 1984 (part III); 23 May 2000 (part IV); 4 March 2003 (part V)
- Genre: Progressive rock; avant-garde; avant-garde metal; free improvisation
- Length: 47:18 (43:37) Individual parts: 13:36 (part I) 7:19 (part II) 6:05 (part III) 13:03 (inc' Coda) 9:07 (without Coda) (part IV) 7:15 (part V)
- Label: Island; E.G.; Virgin; Sanctuary
- Songwriter: Various: Part I Robert Fripp, David Cross, John Wetton, Bill Bruford, Jamie Muir Part II Fripp Part III Fripp, Bruford, Adrian Belew, Tony Levin Parts IV and V Fripp, Belew, Trey Gunn, Pat Mastelotto
- Producers: King Crimson; Machine; David Singleton

"Larks' Tongues in Aspic" is a musical suite by the English progressive rock band King Crimson. Spanning thirty years and four albums, the series comprises five parts, all of which carry unifying musical motifs. Parts I and II were released as the introductory and final tracks on King Crimson's 1973 album of the same name, part III was featured on their 1984 album Three of a Perfect Pair, part IV (itself divided into three identically titled parts) appeared on 2000's The Construkction of Light, and the final part, "Level Five", was included on the 2003 album The Power to Believe. Despite breaking the naming convention, Robert Fripp, King Crimson founder and only constant contributor to the suite, insists that "Level Five" is part of the pentalogy.

In 2011, PopMatters ranked the first part of "Larks' Tongues in Aspic" as the eighth best progressive rock song ever.

== Part I ==
According to Fripp, Part I was conceived as the beginning of a King Crimson performance, and Part II as the end. "Larks' Tongues in Aspic, Part One", the longest entry in the pentalogy, was first released as the introductory track to the album of the same name. The song is guided by the shifting guitar of Robert Fripp, but it is in the tense violin of David Cross and the chaotic percussion of Jamie Muir that Part I is defined.

The track goes through numerous varied acts and passages, with somber moments and a calm violin solo falling alongside periods of heightened aggression where Fripp's guitar borders on heavy metal and Muir's clangs reach cacophony. Bird calls, metallic clangs, horns, breaking crockery and tin ripping are all featured in Muir's repertoire, and, along with his percussive contributions, he coined the title "Larks' Tongues in Aspic". Muir had also placed chains on his tom-toms and attached a baking tray to his bass drum. In a 1991 interview, Muir said it was a "very admirable creative decision" for Fripp to work with him.

=== Composition ===
Much of track originated from full-band improvisations that began in 1971, with Cross calling it "grown" instead of written. Fripp had introduced the song to the King Crimson lineup that recorded Islands and said that the song "wasn't recognized" by the musicians. Drummer Bill Bruford said the songs were "hell" to make given the deliberate lack of in-studio structure. An early version of Part I recorded by the 1971 lineup appeared as a bonus track on the 40th-anniversary edition of Islands under the name "A Peacemaking Stint Unrolls".

Part I is a multi-sectioned composition. The song opens with an African mbira played by Muir over a glockenspiel pattern. This section lasts for three minutes and transitions into a staccato violin ostinato played by Cross. This passage primarily follows a 3-3-2-2 rhythmic grouping in quintuple metre, with further deviations in common time and sextuple metre. A drum roll than leads into a six-chord riff. During the second build-up, Muir played two-tone brass lines on a set of car horns. Another part in 7/8 time follows with John Wetton playing his bass through a wah-wah. Later, the song transitions a quieter intermezzo passage that Muir called the "water music section". This part features Cross and Muir duetting on a violin and hammered zither respectively. Bruford discussed this passage in a 2023 interview with Prog magazine.

David and Jamie play a small tune that they got together on the spot. And I’ve always seen that, in a way, as the lark’s tongue in the aspic. A little jewel, a perfect moment of stillness right in the middle of all this mayhem.

— Bill Bruford

After the water music section, the same ostinato from the second part of the song returns, with Fripp playing the part on his electric guitar. Muir augmented this section with a radio programme recording of a judge handing down a death sentence by hanging. Cross remembered that the dialogue consisted of the lines "'You will be taken from this place and hanged by the neck until you are dead', and the word ‘dead’ coincided with the first note of the final section." The song's final section consists of prominent bass and murmurs from Bruford, Muir, and Cross reciting magazine passages.

"Larks' Tongues in Aspic, Part One" was performed from 1972 to 1974, predominantly in a shortened seven-minute version that left out most of the violin solo and protracted ending passage. Part I was not performed again until 2014, when it was reintroduced as a setlist staple; it remained there through 2019. The new arrangement featured all of the violin segments played on guitar save for the solo, which was performed by Mel Collins on flute.

"Larks' Tongues in Aspic, Part One"
The first part of the pentalogy features heavy metal aspects, complex musical structuring and improvisation.

"Larks' Tongues in Aspic, Part Two"
The second part narrows its focus to Fripp's guitar.

== Part II ==
"Larks' Tongues in Aspic, Part Two" is a riff-focused composition, with the sole writing credit going to Fripp. PopMatters called the track a "roller-coaster of wrath and control". The main riff of part II, which emerged in 1972 during a rehearsal at the Richmond Athletic Club in London, is heavy and driving, drawing its host album to a dramatic climax. While the guitar in part II may be the most immediately obvious aspect, John Goldsby of Bass Player called the bass in the song something that "bass players will still be talking about four decades later". Fripp considered the first two parts of "Larks' Tongues in Aspic" as the refinement of his role as composer in King Crimson.

As the closing track on Larks' Tongues in Aspic, Part Two is followed by a momentary hidden track, which was a tradition for King Crimson up to this point. After the slow fade, the sound of someone asking "Could I do one more immediately?" is heard. Stylus Magazine's Colin Wolfowitz interpreted this Fripp using the hidden track device "to remind himself not to take himself too seriously."

Part II persisted in King Crimson's sets throughout most of their career.

=== Critical reception ===
Both the first and second parts of "Larks' Tongues in Aspic" have been met with critical acclaim. In 2011, Sean Murphy of PopMatters ranked the "Larks' Tongues in Aspic, Part One" as the eighth best progressive rock song ever. He revised his placement in 2017, putting part I as number fifteen and "Larks' Tongues in Aspic, Part Two" as eighty-five. Marc Malitz of Louder Sound judged the first part as the forty-second best progressive song ever.

No.	Title	Writer(s)	Length
1.	"Larks' Tongues in Aspic, Part One"	David Cross, Robert Fripp, John Wetton, Bill Bruford, Jamie Muir	13:34
2.	"Larks' Tongues in Aspic, Part Two"	Robert Fripp	7:14

=== Personnel ===
All credits adapted from Larks' Tongues in Aspic liner notes.

- David Cross – violin, viola
- Robert Fripp – guitar
- John Wetton – bass
- Bill Bruford – drums, woodblock
- Jamie Muir – percussion, drums, autoharp

== Part III ==
"Larks' Tongues in Aspic Part III" was released as the closing track on 1984's Three of a Perfect Pair. This part marks a drastic shift in style from the previous two entries, being created a decade later with two new people, Adrian Belew, and Tony Levin, involved. Part III opens with the same melodic motif seen in parts I and II, but the rhythms and tones are significantly different, with Bruford playing a mix of acoustic and electronic drums. Greg Prato of AllMusic counted "Larks' Tongues in Aspic Part III" as one of his favourite songs from Three of a Perfect Pair.

No.	Title	Writer(s)	Length
1.	"Larks' Tongues in Aspic Part III"	Adrian Belew, Bill Bruford, Robert Fripp, Tony Levin	6:07

=== Personnel ===
"Larks' Tongues in Aspic Part III"
Part III marks a stylistic departure from the preceding entries.

All credits adapted from Three of a Perfect Pair liner notes.

- Adrian Belew – guitar
- Robert Fripp – guitar
- Tony Levin – bass guitar, bass synthesizer
- Bill Bruford – acoustic and electronic drums

== Part IV and "Coda: I Have a Dream" ==
Seeds of the fourth part of the suite were gestating as early as 1995 and appeared as early as 1997 during the band's rehearsals at Nashville. It was not until 2000 that "Larks' Tongues in Aspic – Part IV" was released, appearing on the album The Construkction of Light. Like part II, part IV is heavily guitar-driven, but it introduces new rhythmic and melodic motifs to the series, which would be explored further in part V. "Coda: I Have a Dream" shares some of the series' motifs, but also features lyrics and vocals from Adrian Belew. Though "Coda" was performed live with vocals in 2000, it was later performed live as an instrumental in 2001 and 2003.

On The Construkction of Light, "Larks' Tongues in Aspic - Part IV" is divided into three identically titled tracks that segue into "Coda: I Have a Dream", which is followed by a minute of silence. However, part IV and "Coda" are indexed together in live releases of the 2000-2003 period, as well as the "Expanded Edition" of The Construkction of Light, which also removes the silence after "Coda".

No.	Title	Writer(s)	Length
1.	"Larks' Tongues in Aspic – Part IV"	Adrian Belew, Robert Fripp, Trey Gunn, Pat Mastelotto	3:41
2.	"Larks' Tongues in Aspic – Part IV"	Adrian Belew, Robert Fripp, Trey Gunn, Pat Mastelotto	2:50
3.	"Larks' Tongues in Aspic – Part IV"	Adrian Belew, Robert Fripp, Trey Gunn, Pat Mastelotto	2:36
4.	"Coda: I Have a Dream"	Adrian Belew, Robert Fripp, Trey Gunn, Pat Mastelotto	4:54
Total length:			14:01

iTunes version
No.	Title	Writer(s)	Length
1.	"Larks' Tongues in Aspic, Pt. 4" (including "Coda: I Have a Dream")	Adrian Belew, Robert Fripp, Trey Gunn, Pat Mastelotto	13:03

=== Personnel ===
"Larks' Tongues in Aspic – Part IV"
The fourth part shifts the rhythm of part II and reintroduces its main riff.

All credits adapted from The Construkction of Light liner notes.

- Adrian Belew – guitar, vocals
- Robert Fripp – guitar
- Trey Gunn – Warr guitar
- Pat Mastelotto – electronic drums and percussion

== "Level Five" ==
Originally, the fifth part of "Larks' Tongues in Aspic" was the song "FraKctured" off of The Construkction of Light, but, seeing how it bore closer resemblance to "Fracture" from 1974's Starless and Bible Black, the band agreed to change the name late in the song's development. The fifth part was ultimately released on 2003's The Power to Believe with the title "Level Five". Though nothing in the album's packaging confirmed that the song was part of "Larks' Tongues in Aspic", it shared elements of the series' rhythmic structure and form. While the relationship to the suite was hinted with an early 2001 tour jam combining a riff from part 1 of the suite with part of this piece, official confirmation only first appeared in the Elements 2017 box set, where it was included in sequence with the rest of the suite and called "truly LTIA Pt V in all but name." The following year, Fripp confirmed that "Level Five" was the fifth entry in the suite, but was renamed to "unseat" the expectations associated with the "Larks' Tongues in Aspic" title. It has since appeared on setlists and DGM Live downloads as "Larks' Tongues in Aspic Part V". The track is also listed on various streaming services as "Level V" with a Roman numeral, making it more consistent with the naming of the other parts.

"Level Five" is a heavy guitar-driven track with glitchy and electronic drums that provide a rare, almost industrial groove. Several critics noted the sonic aggression of the song, and some compared the guitar interplay between Fripp and Belew as similar to the music on 1981's Discipline. AllMusic's Lindsay Planer called "Level Five" so intense "that it could easily be mistaken for the likes of Tool, Ministry, Nine Inch Nails, or KMFDM".

No.	Title	Writer(s)	Length
1.	"Level Five"	Adrian Belew, Robert Fripp, Trey Gunn, Pat Mastelotto	7:17

=== Personnel ===
"Level Five"
"Level Five" features a darker, more aggressive tone than previous entries in the suite.

All credits adapted from The Power to Believe liner notes.

- Adrian Belew – guitar
- Robert Fripp – guitar
- Trey Gunn – Warr guitar
- Pat Mastelotto – drums, electronic percussion
