= Starless =

Song by King Crimson

from the album Red
- Released: 6 October 1974
- Recorded: August 1974
- Studio: Olympic, London
- Genre: Progressive rock; jazz-rock; heavy metal
- Length: 12:18
- Label: Island (UK & Europe), Atlantic (USA)
- Composers: John Wetton; Bill Bruford; Robert Fripp; David Cross
- Lyricists: Richard Palmer-James; John Wetton
- Producer: King Crimson

"Starless" is a composition by the English progressive rock band King Crimson. It is the final track on their seventh studio album, Red, released on 6 October 1974.

== Background ==
The original chords and melody for "Starless" were written by King Crimson bassist John Wetton, who had intended for the song to be the title track of Starless and Bible Black. Guitarist Robert Fripp and drummer Bill Bruford initially disliked the song and declined to record it for that album. Fripp justified the decision to omit "Starless" from Starless and Bible Black over his belief that the song "wasn't complete" when Wetton first presented it to King Crimson, citing the unfinished lyrics as one of the reasons for temporarily shelving it.

However, the song was revived during subsequent tours between March and May 1974, with its lyrics altered and a long instrumental section added, based on a riff written by Bruford, which consisted of what Fripp described as a "very simple" one note guitar pattern that does "virtually nothing other than move up slowly and incrementally until it really opens out widely." Fripp said that for these renditions, there were some lines where Wetton would vocalize sounds as placeholders for the actual lyrics.

For the Red recording sessions, the lyrics were again altered by lyricist Richard Palmer-James, and the introductory theme originally played by violinist David Cross, who had since left the band, was instead played by Fripp with some alterations. As the title "Starless and Bible Black" had already been used, the original title was shortened to "Starless". Bruford mentioned in his autobiography that Robin Miller contributed a variation on the song's main theme on oboe towards the end of the song and was encouraged by people in the control room to play a 30 second solo over the chord changes without any sheet music, but was ultimately unable to do so.

King Crimson included "Starless" in their live setlists from 2014-2021. "Starless" was also the final song King Crimson played before Fripp announced in 2021 that the band would go from "sound to silence".

== Composition ==
The piece is 12 minutes and 18 seconds in length, the longest on Red. It starts with mellotron strings, electric guitar, bass, and a soprano saxophone. These introduce a vocal segment in conventional verse-chorus structure.

The middle section of the song builds, in 13/8. Starting with John Wetton's bass, Bill Bruford joins shortly afterwards on percussion. Robert Fripp's guitar repeats a single note theme on two adjacent guitar strings. Bruford's drumming maintains its irregularity.

The song's final section begins with an abrupt transition to a fast, jazzy saxophone solo with distorted guitars and bass, expressive tribal drumming, and the tempo doubling up to a time signature of 13/16. Variations of the middle section's bassline are played under Fripp's layered and overdriven guitar parts. The saxophone returns to play a reprise of the vocal melody, then the final section is repeated with more overdubs from Fripp. Finally, the song ends with a reprise of the opening melody, removing the guitar in favour of a deeper bass.

== Critical reception ==
Sean Murphy of PopMatters characterised "Starless" as "one of the all-time progressive rock masterworks", adding that it was "brooding and heavy, fraught with feeling and foreboding". Guitar World referred to the song as "sprawlingly beautiful". In May 2026, Collider ranked "Starless" No. 1 on its list of "10 Best Classic Rock Songs of the 1970s".

== Personnel ==
- Robert Fripp – electric guitar, Mellotron, Hohner Pianet
- John Wetton – bass guitar, vocals
- Bill Bruford – drums, percussion

with:

- Mel Collins – soprano saxophone
- Ian McDonald – alto saxophone
- uncredited – double bass, cello

== Cover versions ==
Artists who have covered "Starless" include Neal Morse, Mike Portnoy and Randy George (under the name Morse/Portnoy/George); Craig Armstrong, on his album As If to Nothing as "Starless II"; Banco de Gaia, on their album Memories Dreams Reflections; The Unthanks, on their 2011 album Last; the Crimson Jazz Trio, on their album King Crimson Songbook Volume One (2005).

The song has been covered live by Asia, a supergroup of which John Wetton was a founding member; 21st Century Schizoid Band, a group made up of former and future members of King Crimson; After Crying, a Hungarian symphonic rock band, with guest vocals by Wetton; U.K., one of whose members was Wetton; and District 97 with Wetton.

FM performed a live version of "Starless" in 1977 which was released on the compilation Lost in Space in 2001.

== In other media ==
The first part of "Starless" is used in the opening of the 2018 film Mandy.
