= Frame by Frame: The Essential King Crimson =

Frame By Frame: The Essential King Crimson

Box set by King Crimson
- Released: 4 November 1991
- Recorded: 1969–1984; 1991 (overdubs)
- Genre: Progressive rock
- Length: 256:46
- Label: Caroline
- Producer: King Crimson

King Crimson chronology
Heartbeat: The Abbreviated King Crimson (1991)	Frame By Frame: The Essential King Crimson (1991)	Sleepless: The Concise King Crimson (1993)

Frame by Frame: The Essential King Crimson is a 4-CD retrospective box set by the English progressive rock band King Crimson, released in 1991. A follow-up 4-CD box set, The Great Deceiver, appeared the next year, followed by the 1-CD compilation album Sleepless: The Concise King Crimson in 1993.

== Track listing ==
=== Disc 1: 1969–1971 ===
1. "21st Century Schizoid Man" (Robert Fripp, Ian McDonald, Greg Lake, Michael Giles, Peter Sinfield) - 7:20
2. "I Talk to the Wind" (McDonald, Sinfield) - 6:05
3. "Epitaph" (Fripp, McDonald, Lake, Giles, Sinfield) - 8:44
4. "Moonchild" (Fripp, McDonald, Lake, Giles, Sinfield) - 2:26
  Abridged version, omitting the improv section of the song
5. "The Court of the Crimson King" (McDonald, Sinfield) - 9:25
6. "Peace: A Theme" (Fripp) - 1:16
7. "Cat Food" (Fripp, McDonald, Sinfield) - 2:45
  Single version
8. "Groon" (Fripp) - 3:31
  Previously unreleased on CD; also featured on the 2-LP compilation A Young Person's Guide to King Crimson (1976)
9. "Cadence and Cascade" (Fripp, Sinfield) - 4:10
  New mix, replacing Gordon Haskell's original vocals with vocals performed by Adrian Belew, July 1991
10. "The Sailor's Tale" (Fripp) - 7:27
  Abridged version, removing approximately 3.5 seconds' worth of the cymbal introduction
11. "Ladies of the Road" (Fripp, Sinfield) - 5:31
12. "Bolero" (Fripp, Sinfield) - 6:45
  New mix, replacing Gordon Haskell's original bass guitar with bass guitar performed by Tony Levin, June 1991

Tracks 1–5 from In the Court of the Crimson King (1969)
Tracks 6–7 & 9 from In the Wake of Poseidon (1970)
Tracks 7–8 released as the single "Cat Food/Groon" in 1970
Track 12 from Lizard (1970)
Tracks 10–11 from Islands (1971)

Total Running Time - 67:47

=== Disc 2: 1972–1974 ===
1. "Larks' Tongues in Aspic (Part I)" (David Cross, Fripp, John Wetton, Bill Bruford, Jamie Muir) - 10:53
  Abridged version
2. "Book of Saturday" (Fripp, Wetton, Richard Palmer-James) - 2:53
3. "Easy Money" (Fripp, Palmer-James, Wetton) - 7:55
4. "Larks' Tongues in Aspic (Part II)" (Fripp) - 7:09
5. "The Night Watch" (Fripp, Wetton, Palmer-James) - 4:40
6. "The Great Deceiver" (Fripp, Wetton, Palmer-James) - 4:03
7. "Fracture" (Fripp) - 6:57
  Abridged version
8. "Starless" (Cross, Fripp, Wetton, Bruford, Palmer-James) - 4:38
  Abridged version
9. "Red" (Fripp) - 6:17
10. "Fallen Angel" (Fripp, Wetton, Palmer-James) - 5:59
11. "One More Red Nightmare" (Fripp, Wetton) - 7:09

Tracks 1–4 from the album Larks' Tongues in Aspic (1973)
Tracks 5–7 from the album Starless and Bible Black (1974)
Tracks 8–11 from the album Red (1974)

Total Running Time - 69:08

=== Disc 3: 1981–1984 ===
All tracks on disc 3 written by Adrian Belew, Bruford, Fripp and Tony Levin, unless otherwise indicated.

1. "Elephant Talk" - 4:42
2. "Frame by Frame" - 5:08
3. "Matte Kudasai" - 3:48
4. "Thela Hun Ginjeet" - 6:26
5. "Heartbeat" - 3:54
6. "Waiting Man" - 4:22
7. "Neurotica" - 4:48
8. "Requiem" - 6:36
9. "Three of a Perfect Pair" - 4:11
10. "Sleepless" - 5:22
11. "Discipline" - 5:05
12. "The Sheltering Sky" - 8:16
13. "The King Crimson Barber Shop" (Levin) - 1:31
  Also featured on the compilation Heartbeat: The Abbreviated King Crimson (1991), subsequently featured on the reissued version of the album Three of a Perfect Pair (1984)

Tracks 1–4 & 11–12 from the album Discipline (1981)
Tracks 5–8 from the album Beat (1982)
Tracks 9–10 from the album Three of a Perfect Pair (1984)

Total Running Time - 64:08

=== Disc 4: Live 1969–1984 ===
1. "Get Thy Bearings" (Donovan Leitch) - 9:21
  Recorded at Plumpton Racetrack (at the Ninth National Jazz and Blues Festival), Streat, UK, 9 August 1969
  subsequently featured on the live album (4-CD set) Epitaph
2. "Travel Weary Capricorn" (Fripp, McDonald, Lake, Giles, Sinfield) - 4:23
  Recorded at Plumpton Racetrack (at the Ninth National Jazz and Blues Festival), Streat, UK, 9 August 1969
  Subsequently featured on the live 4-CD set Epitaph (1997)
3. "Mars" (Gustav Holst) - 8:09
  Recorded at the Fillmore West, San Francisco, California, United States, 14 December 1969*
  subsequently featured on the live 4-CD set Epitaph
4. "The Talking Drum" (Cross, Fripp, Wetton, Muir, Bruford) - 8:30
  Recorded at the Concertgebouw, Amsterdam, the Netherlands, 23 November 1973;
  subsequently featured on the live 2-CD set The Night Watch (1997)
5. "21st Century Schizoid Man" (Fripp, McDonald, Lake, Giles, Sinfield) - 9:15
  Recorded at the Concertgebouw, Amsterdam, the Netherlands, 23 November 1973
  subsequently featured on the live 2-CD set The Night Watch
6. "Asbury Park" (Cross, Fripp, Wetton, Bruford) - 6:52
  Recorded at the Casino, Asbury Park, New Jersey, 28 June 1974; previously featured on the live album USA (1975)
7. "Larks' Tongues in Aspic (Part III)" (Belew, Bruford, Fripp, Levin) - 2:35
  recorded at Le Spectrum, Montreal, Quebec, Canada, 11 July 1984; excerpt version from the afternoon show. A complete performance from the evening show was subsequently featured on the live 2-CD set Absent Lovers: Live in Montreal (1998)
8. "Sartori in Tangier" (Belew, Bruford, Fripp, Levin) - 4:08
  recorded at Le Spectrum, Montreal, Quebec, Canada, 11 July 1984
  subsequently featured on the live album (2-CD set) Absent Lovers: Live in Montreal
9. "Indiscipline" (Belew, Bruford, Fripp, Levin) - 5:26
  Recorded at the Arena, Fréjus, France, 27 August 1982; subsequently featured on the live album (King Crimson Collectors' Club release) Live at Cap D'Agde (April 1999)

Total Running Time - 61:20

(*) The Frame by Frame booklet incorrectly lists the date as 10 December 1969.
