= Sleepless: The Concise King Crimson =

Compilation album by King Crimson
- Released: 4 October 1993
- Recorded: 1969–1983
- Genre: Progressive rock
- Length: 75:30
- Label: Caroline
- Producer: Robert Fripp

King Crimson chronology
Frame by Frame: The Essential King Crimson (1991)	Sleepless: The Concise King Crimson (1993)	The 21st Century Guide to King Crimson - Volume One - 1969-1974 (2004)

Professional ratings
Review scores
Source	Rating
AllMusic	3/5 stars

Sleepless: The Concise King Crimson is a compilation album by the English progressive rock band King Crimson. A 1-CD distillation of the 1991 4-CD box set Frame by Frame: The Essential King Crimson, Sleepless was released on 4 October 1993.

== Track listing ==
No.	Title	Writer(s)	Original album	Length
1.	"21st Century Schizoid Man" (including "Mirrors")	Robert Fripp, Ian McDonald, Greg Lake, Michael Giles, Peter Sinfield	In the Court of the Crimson King (1969)	7:20
2.	"Epitaph" (including "March for No Reason" and "Tomorrow and Tomorrow")	Fripp, McDonald, Lake, Giles, Sinfield	In the Court of the Crimson King	8:45
3.	"The Court of the Crimson King" (Abridged version; including "The Return of the Fire Witch" and "The Dance of the Puppets")	McDonald, Sinfield	In the Court of the Crimson King	5:19
4.	"Cat Food" (Single edit)	Fripp, McDonald, Sinfield	In the Wake of Poseidon (1970)	2:45
5.	"Ladies of the Road"	Fripp, Sinfield	Islands (1971)	5:30
6.	"Starless" (Abridged version)	David Cross, Fripp, John Wetton, Bill Bruford, Richard Palmer-James	Red (1974)	4:36
7.	"Red"	Fripp	Red	6:16
8.	"Fallen Angel"	Fripp, Wetton, Palmer-James	Red	6:00
9.	"Elephant Talk"	Adrian Belew, Bruford, Fripp, Tony Levin	Discipline (1981)	4:43
10.	"Frame by Frame"	Belew, Bruford, Fripp, Levin	Discipline	5:07
11.	"Matte Kudasai"	Belew, Bruford, Fripp, Levin	Discipline	3:45
12.	"Heartbeat"	Belew, Bruford, Fripp, Levin	Beat (1982)	3:53
13.	"Three of a Perfect Pair"	Belew, Bruford, Fripp, Levin	Three of a Perfect Pair (1984)	4:11
14.	"Sleepless"	Belew, Bruford, Fripp, Levin	Three of a Perfect Pair	5:22
