= The Compact King Crimson =

Compilation album by King Crimson
- Released: 8 December 1986
- Recorded: 1969–1984
- Genre: Progressive rock
- Length: 79:13 (Vinyl); 70:10 (CD)
- Label: EG
- Producer: King Crimson

King Crimson chronology
Three of a Perfect Pair (1984)	The Compact King Crimson (1986)	Heartbeat: The Abbreviated King Crimson (1991)

Professional ratings
Review scores
Source	Rating
AllMusic	4.5/5 stars
Kerrang!	(3.7/5)

The Compact King Crimson is a compilation of songs by the English progressive rock band King Crimson, selected by Robert Fripp from the then-two different eras of the band.

The cover art features the Fergus Hall painting Il Divino. Paintings by Hall emblazoned the previous King Crimson compilation, A Young Person's Guide to King Crimson.

== Track listing ==
=== LP/cassette version ===
==== Side one ====
No.	Title	Writer(s)	Original album	Length
1.	"Discipline"	Adrian Belew, Bill Bruford, Robert Fripp, Tony Levin	Discipline, 1981	5:01
2.	"Thela Hun Ginjeet"	Belew, Bruford, Fripp, Levin	Discipline	6:27
3.	"Matte Kudasai"	Belew, Bruford, Fripp, Levin	Discipline	3:48
4.	"Three of a Perfect Pair"	Belew, Bruford, Fripp, Levin	Three of a Perfect Pair, 1984	4:13

==== Side two ====
No.	Title	Writer(s)	Original album	Length
1.	"Frame by Frame"	Belew, Bruford, Fripp, Levin	Discipline	5:08
2.	"Sleepless"	Belew, Bruford, Fripp, Levin	Sleepless" 12" single A-side, 1984 (mixed by Bob Clearmountain)	5:24
3.	"Heartbeat"	Belew, Bruford, Fripp, Levin	Beat, 1982	3:56
4.	"Elephant Talk"	Belew, Bruford, Fripp, Levin	Discipline	4:36

==== Side three ====
No.	Title	Writer(s)	Original album	Length
1.	"21st Century Schizoid Man" (including "Mirrors")	Fripp, Ian McDonald, Greg Lake, Michael Giles, Peter Sinfield	In the Court of the Crimson King, 1969	7:20
2.	"I Talk to the Wind"	Fripp, McDonald, Lake, Giles, Sinfield	In the Court of the Crimson King	6:06
3.	"Epitaph" (including "March for No Reason" and "Tomorrow and Tomorrow")	Fripp, McDonald, Lake, Giles, Sinfield	In the Court of the Crimson King	8:49

==== Side four ====
No.	Title	Writer(s)	Original album	Length
1.	"Red"	Fripp	Red, 1974	6:17
2.	"Cat Food" (Single version)	Fripp, Sinfield, McDonald	"Cat Food/Groon" 7" single A-side, 1970	2:46
3.	"The Court of the Crimson King" (including "The Return of the Fire Witch" and "The Dance of the Puppets")	McDonald, Sinfield	In the Court of the Crimson King	9:22

=== CD version ===
No.	Title	Writer(s)	Original album	Length
1.	"Discipline"	Belew, Bruford, Fripp, Levin	Discipline, 1981	5:01
2.	"Thela Hun Ginjeet"	Belew, Bruford, Fripp, Levin	Discipline	6:27
3.	"Matte Kudasai"	Belew, Bruford, Fripp, Levin	Discipline	3:48
4.	"Three of a Perfect Pair"	Belew, Bruford, Fripp, Levin	Three of a Perfect Pair, 1984	4:13
5.	"Frame by Frame"	Belew, Bruford, Fripp, Levin	Discipline	5:08
6.	"Sleepless"	Belew, Bruford, Fripp, Levin	Three of a Perfect Pair	5:24
7.	"Heartbeat"	Belew, Bruford, Fripp, Levin	Beat, 1982	3:56
8.	"Elephant Talk"	Belew, Bruford, Fripp, Levin	Discipline	4:36
9.	"21st Century Schizoid Man" (including "Mirrors")	Fripp, Giles, Lake, McDonald, Sinfield	In the Court of the Crimson King, 1969	7:20
10.	"I Talk to the Wind"	Fripp, Giles, Lake, McDonald, Sinfield	In the Court of the Crimson King	6:06
11.	"Epitaph" (including "March for No Reason" and "Tomorrow and Tomorrow")	Fripp, Giles, Lake, McDonald, Sinfield	In the Court of the Crimson King	8:49
12.	"The Court of the Crimson King" (including "The Return of the Fire Witch" and "The Dance of the Puppets")	McDonald, Sinfield	In the Court of the Crimson King	9:22

== Personnel ==
- Robert Fripp – guitars, devices (all tracks)
- Adrian Belew – guitar, lead vocals (on "Discipline", "Thela Hun Ginjeet", "Matte Kudasai", "Three of a Perfect Pair", "Frame by Frame", "Sleepless", Heartbeat", "Elephant Talk")
- Bill Bruford – drums, percussion (on "Discipline", "Thela Hun Ginjeet", "Matte Kudasai", "Three of a Perfect Pair", "Frame by Frame", "Sleepless", Heartbeat", "Elephant Talk", "Red")
- Tony Levin – Chapman Stick, basses, backing vocals (on "Discipline", "Thela Hun Ginjeet", "Matte Kudasai", "Three of a Perfect Pair", "Frame by Frame", "Sleepless", Heartbeat", "Elephant Talk")
- Michael Giles – drums, percussion, vocals (on "21st Century Schizoid Man", "I Talk to the Wind", "Epitaph", "Cat Food", "The Court of the Crimson King")
- Greg Lake – lead vocals, basses (on "21st Century Schizoid Man", "I Talk to the Wind", "Epitaph", "Cat Food", "The Court of the Crimson King")
- Ian McDonald – woodwinds, reeds, keyboards, Mellotron, vocals (on "21st Century Schizoid Man", "I Talk to the Wind", "Epitaph", "The Court of the Crimson King")
- John Wetton – bass (on "Red")
- Peter Giles – bass (on "Cat Food")
- Keith Tippett – piano (on "Cat Food")
