= Heartbeat: The Abbreviated King Crimson =

Compilation album by King Crimson
- Released: October 1991
- Recorded: 1969–1984
- Genre: Progressive rock
- Length: 22:44
- Label: Caroline
- Producer: King Crimson

King Crimson chronology
The Compact King Crimson (1986)	Heartbeat: The Abbreviated King Crimson (1991)	Frame by Frame: The Essential King Crimson (1991)

Heartbeat: The Abbreviated King Crimson is a compilation by English progressive rock band King Crimson, originally intended for radio stations as a promo vehicle to accompany Frame by Frame: The Essential King Crimson 4-CD boxed set. It was released in 1991. The medley was prepared to present an intensive overview of the catalogue to Virgin Records.

== Track listing ==
1. "The King Crimson Barber Shop" (Tony Levin) (1:31)
  Also featured on the compilation (4-CD set) Frame by Frame: The Essential King Crimson (1991); subsequently featured on the reissued version of the album Three of a Perfect Pair (1984)
2. "21st Century Schizoid Man" (Robert Fripp, Ian McDonald, Greg Lake, Michael Giles, Peter Sinfield) (4:43)
  Abbreviated version from the album In the Court of the Crimson King (1969)
3. "The Court of the Crimson King" (McDonald, Sinfield) (4:54)
  Single version from the album In the Court of the Crimson King
4. "Elephant Talk" (Adrian Belew, Bill Bruford, Fripp, Levin) (3:33)
  Edited version from the album Discipline (1981)
5. "Matte Kudasai" (Belew, Bruford, Fripp, Levin) (3:46)
  From the album Discipline
6. "Heartbeat" (Belew, Bruford, Fripp, Levin) (2:57)
  Edited version from the album Beat (1982)
7. "Medley" (1:20)
  Consisting of the following songs: "The King Crimson Barber Shop," "21st Century Schizoid Man," "Ladies of the Road," "Red," "Starless,"
  "Epitaph," "The Court of the Crimson King," "Elephant Talk," "Cat Food," "Matte Kudasai," "Sleepless," and "Heartbeat."
