= The Road to Red =

Box set by King Crimson
- Released: 2013
- Studios: Olympic Studios, London, England
- Genres: Progressive rock, Heavy metal
- Labels: Discipline Global Mobile; Panegyric
- Producer: King Crimson

King Crimson chronology
Larks' Tongues in Aspic (2012)	The Road to Red (2013)	Starless (2014)

The Road to Red is the third of the major box set releases from English progressive rock group King Crimson, released in 2013 by Discipline Global Mobile & Panegyric Records.

Whilst the focus of this release is the Red studio album, it is just one of 24 discs featuring live concert material from 1974, including the majority of King Crimson's US tour from that year.

Over 21 audio CDs, 1 DVD, 2 Blu-ray Discs, sleeve notes and replica memorabilia, The Road to Red captures the process leading to one of the band's most important albums, and what would be their final work for seven years.

A total of 16 complete concerts are featured across 20 discs, with a new 2013 Steven Wilson and Robert Fripp stereo mix of Red as the 21st CD.

2 album prints, a 36 page album sized booklet with rare photos, eye witness accounts of the concerts and sleevenotes incorporating new interviews with John Wetton, Bill Bruford, David Cross and others, plus postcards and other memorabilia.

== Track listing ==
The Road to Red, Disc 1 (Veterans Memorial Coliseum, Columbus, Ohio, 28 April 1974)
No.	Title	Writer(s)	Length
1.	"The Great Deceiver" (Incomplete recording)	Fripp, Wetton, Palmer-James	3:26
2.	"Lament"	Fripp, Wetton, Palmer-James	4:19
3.	"Improv I"	Cross, Fripp, Wetton, Bruford	2:15
4.	"Exiles"	Cross, Fripp, Wetton, Palmer-James	7:00
5.	"Fracture"	Fripp	11:04
6.	"Easy Money"	Fripp, Wetton, Palmer-James	6:45
7.	"Improv II"	Cross, Fripp, Wetton, Bruford	2:40
8.	"The Night Watch"	Fripp, Wetton, Palmer-James	4:53
9.	"RF Announcement"	Fripp	2:06

The Road to Red, Discs 2 & 3 (Stanley Warner Theatre, Pittsburgh, 29 April 1974)
No.	Title	Writer(s)	Length
1.	"Walk On: (No Pussyfooting)"	Fripp, Brian Eno	0:59
2.	"The Great Deceiver"	Fripp, Wetton, Palmer-James	3:42
3.	"Lament"	Fripp, Wetton, Palmer-James	4:58
4.	"Bartley Butsford" (Improv)	Cross, Fripp, Wetton, Bruford	3:13
5.	"Exiles"	Cross, Fripp, Wetton, Palmer-James	6:47
6.	"Fracture"	Fripp	11:11
7.	"Easy Money"	Fripp, Wetton, Palmer-James	6:04
8.	"Daniel Dust" (Improv)	Cross, Fripp, Wetton, Bruford	4:40
9.	"The Night Watch"	Fripp, Wetton, Palmer-James	4:36
10.	"Doctor Diamond"	Cross, Fripp, Wetton, Bruford, Palmer-James	5:17
11.	"Starless"	Cross, Fripp, Wetton, Bruford, Palmer-James	12:25
12.	"Wilton Carpet" (Improv)	Cross, Fripp, Wetton, Bruford	5:43
13.	"The Talking Drum"	Cross, Fripp, Wetton, Bruford, Jamie Muir	5:39
14.	"Larks' Tongues in Aspic (Part II)"	Fripp	10:26
15.	"21st Century Schizoid Man"	Fripp, Ian McDonald, Greg Lake, Michael Giles, Peter Sinfield	8:27

The Road to Red, Disc 4 (Hofheinz Pavilion, Houston, Texas, 5 June 1974)
No.	Title	Writer(s)	Length
1.	"The Great Deceiver" (Incomplete recording)	Fripp, Wetton, Palmer-James	2:31
2.	"Lament"	Fripp, Wetton, Palmer-James	4:12
3.	"Improv"	Cross, Fripp, Wetton, Bruford	2:03
4.	"Exiles"	Cross, Fripp, Wetton, Palmer-James	6:29
5.	"Fracture"	Fripp	10:56
6.	"Starless"	Cross, Fripp, Wetton, Bruford, Palmer-James	11:40
7.	"The Talking Drum"	Cross, Fripp, Wetton, Bruford, Muir	5:48
8.	"Larks' Tongues in Aspic (Part II)" (Incomplete recording)	Fripp	4:21

The Road to Red, Disc 5 (Tarrant County Convention Center, Fort Worth, Texas, 6 June 1974)
No.	Title	Writer(s)	Length
1.	"Walk On: No Pussyfooting"	Fripp, Eno	1:45
2.	"Easy Money"	Fripp, Wetton, Palmer-James	5:38
3.	"Lament"	Fripp, Wetton, Palmer-James	4:49
4.	"Fracture"	Fripp	11:14
5.	"Improv"	Cross, Fripp, Wetton, Bruford	6:32
6.	"The Talking Drum"	Cross, Fripp, Wetton, Bruford, Muir	5:19
7.	"Larks' Tongues in Aspic (Part II)"	Fripp	6:41
8.	"21st Century Schizoid Man"	Fripp, McDonald, Lake, Giles, Sinfield	7:05

The Road to Red, Disc 6 (Fairground Arena, Oklahoma City, Oklahoma, 7 June 1974)
No.	Title	Writer(s)	Length
1.	"The Great Deceiver" (Incomplete recording)	Fripp, Wetton, Palmer-James	2:51
2.	"Lament"	Fripp, Wetton, Palmer-James	5:09
3.	"Improv I"	Cross, Fripp, Wetton, Bruford	2:06
4.	"Exiles"	Cross, Fripp, Wetton, Palmer-James	6:48
5.	"Fracture"	Fripp	10:51
6.	"Starless"	Cross, Fripp, Wetton, Bruford, Palmer-James	11:56
7.	"Improv II"	Cross, Fripp, Wetton, Bruford	3:22
8.	"The Talking Drum" (Incomplete recording)	Cross, Fripp, Wetton, Bruford, Muir	3:46
9.	"The Talking Drum insert" (to maintain continuity, taken from Disc 5 show)	Cross, Fripp, Wetton, Bruford, Muir	2:35
10.	"Larks' Tongues in Aspic (Part II)" (Incomplete recording)	Fripp	5:20

The Road to Red, Disc 7 (Civil Auditorium, El Paso, Texas, 8 June 1974)
No.	Title	Writer(s)	Length
1.	"Larks' Tongues in Aspic (Part II)" (Incomplete recording)	Fripp	6:03
2.	"Lament"	Fripp, Wetton, Palmer-James	4:25
3.	"Improv"	Cross, Fripp, Wetton, Bruford	2:34
4.	"Exiles"	Cross, Fripp, Wetton, Palmer-James	7:20
5.	"Easy Money"	Fripp, Wetton, Palmer-James	5:53
6.	"Fracture"	Fripp	11:13
7.	"RF Announcement"	Fripp	1:24
8.	"Starless (Part I)"	Cross, Fripp, Wetton, Bruford, Palmer-James	7:31
9.	"Starless (Part II)"	Cross, Fripp, Wetton, Bruford, Palmer-James	2:51

The Road to Red, Disc 8 (Coliseum, Denver, Colorado, 16 June 1974)
No.	Title	Writer(s)	Length
1.	"The Great Deceiver" (Incomplete recording)	Fripp, Wetton, Palmer-James	3:48
2.	"Lament"	Fripp, Wetton, Palmer-James	4:10
3.	"Exiles"	Cross, Fripp, Wetton, Palmer-James	6:44
4.	"Easy Money"	Fripp, Wetton, Palmer-James	5:19
5.	"Starless"	Cross, Fripp, Wetton, Bruford, Palmer-James	11:53
6.	"The Talking Drum" (Incomplete recording)	Cross, Fripp, Wetton, Bruford, Muir	5:25

The Road to Red, Disc 9 (Performing Arts Center, Milwaukee, Wisconsin, 22 June 1974)
No.	Title	Writer(s)	Length
1.	"Larks' Tongues in Aspic (Part II)" (Incomplete recording)	Fripp	6:08
2.	"Lament"	Fripp, Wetton, Palmer-James	4:23
3.	"Improv I"	Cross, Fripp, Wetton, Bruford	1:37
4.	"Exiles"	Cross, Fripp, Wetton, Palmer-James	6:57
5.	"Improv II"	Cross, Fripp, Wetton, Bruford	8:29
6.	"The Night Watch"	Fripp, Wetton, Palmer-James	4:42
7.	"Starless"	Cross, Fripp, Wetton, Bruford, Palmer-James	12:27

The Road to Red, Disc 10 (Aquinas College, Grand Rapids, Michigan, 23 June 1974)
No.	Title	Writer(s)	Length
1.	"Larks' Tongues in Aspic (Part II)" (Incomplete recording)	Fripp	5:59
2.	"Lament"	Fripp, Wetton, Palmer-James	4:12
3.	"Improv I"	Cross, Fripp, Wetton, Bruford	1:19
4.	"Exiles"	Cross, Fripp, Wetton, Palmer-James	6:04
5.	"Easy Money" (Incomplete recording)	Fripp, Wetton, Palmer-James	1:29
6.	"Improv II"	Cross, Fripp, Wetton, Bruford	4:18
7.	"The Great Deceiver"	Fripp, Wetton, Palmer-James	3:45
8.	"Fracture"	Fripp	11:08
9.	"Starless"	Cross, Fripp, Wetton, Bruford, Palmer-James	12:23

The Road to Red, Discs 11 & 12 (Massey Hall, Toronto, Ontario, 24 June 1974)
No.	Title	Writer(s)	Length
1.	"Walk On: No Pussyfooting"	Fripp, Eno	1:31
2.	"Larks' Tongues in Aspic (Part II)"	Fripp	6:16
3.	"Lament"	Fripp, Wetton, Palmer-James	5:07
4.	"Exiles"	Cross, Fripp, Wetton, Palmer-James	8:23
5.	"The Golden Walnut" (Improv)	Cross, Fripp, Wetton, Bruford	11:39
6.	"The Night Watch"	Fripp, Wetton, Palmer-James	4:36
7.	"Fracture"	Fripp	11:08
8.	"Clueless and Slightly Slack" (Improv)	Cross, Fripp, Wetton, Bruford	9:58
9.	"Easy Money"	Fripp, Wetton, Palmer-James	7:11
10.	"Starless"	Cross, Fripp, Wetton, Bruford, Palmer-James	14:52
11.	"21st Century Schizoid Man"	Fripp, McDonald, Lake, Giles, Sinfield	9:35

The Road to Red, Disc 13 (Convention Center, Quebec City, Quebec, 25 June 1974)
No.	Title	Writer(s)	Length
1.	"21st Century Schizoid Man"	Fripp, McDonald, Lake, Giles, Sinfield	7:20
2.	"Lament"	Fripp, Wetton, Palmer-James	4:18
3.	"Improv I"	Cross, Fripp, Wetton, Bruford	1:18
4.	"Exiles"	Cross, Fripp, Wetton, Palmer-James	7:14
5.	"Easy Money"	Fripp, Wetton, Palmer-James	7:05
6.	"Improv II"	Cross, Fripp, Wetton, Bruford	6:31
7.	"Fracture"	Fripp	10:53
8.	"Starless" (Incomplete recording)	Cross, Fripp, Wetton, Bruford, Palmer-James	10:44

The Road to Red, Disc 14 (Kennedy Centre, Washington, D.C., 27 June 1974)
No.	Title	Writer(s)	Length
1.	"Lament"	Fripp, Wetton, Palmer-James	4:23
2.	"Improv I"	Cross, Fripp, Wetton, Bruford	1:55
3.	"Exiles"	Cross, Fripp, Wetton, Palmer-James	6:40
4.	"Easy Money"	Fripp, Wetton, Palmer-James	8:26
5.	"Improv II"	Cross, Fripp, Wetton, Bruford	3:13
6.	"Fracture"	Fripp	10:55
7.	"Starless"	Cross, Fripp, Wetton, Bruford, Palmer-James	13:01

The Road to Red, Discs 15 & 16 (Casino Arena, Asbury Park, New Jersey, 28 June 1974)
No.	Title	Writer(s)	Length
1.	"Walk On: No Pussyfooting"	Fripp, Eno	1:39
2.	"Larks' Tongues in Aspic (Part II)"	Fripp	6:24
3.	"Lament"	Fripp, Wetton, Palmer-James	4:20
4.	"Exiles"	Cross, Fripp, Wetton, Palmer-James	7:16
5.	"Asbury Park" (Improv)	Cross, Fripp, Wetton, Bruford	11:41
6.	"Easy Money"	Fripp, Wetton, Palmer-James	11:07
7.	"Fracture"	Fripp	11:02
8.	"Starless"	Cross, Fripp, Wetton, Bruford, Palmer-James	15:50
9.	"21st Century Schizoid Man"	Fripp, McDonald, Lake, Giles, Sinfield	9:33

The Road to Red, Disc 17 (Penn State University, University Park, Pennsylvania, 29 June 1974)
No.	Title	Writer(s)	Length
1.	"Walk On: No Pussyfooting"	Fripp, Eno	1:56
2.	"Larks' Tongues in Aspic (Part II)"	Fripp	6:26
3.	"Lament"	Fripp, Wetton, Palmer-James	5:03
4.	"Exiles"	Cross, Fripp, Wetton, Palmer-James	7:22
5.	"Is There Life Out There?" (Improv)	Cross, Fripp, Wetton, Bruford	14:14
6.	"Easy Money"	Fripp, Wetton, Palmer-James	2:22
7.	"It Is for You, but Not for Us" (Improv)	Cross, Fripp, Wetton, Bruford	7:37
8.	"Fracture"	Fripp	10:54
9.	"Starless"	Cross, Fripp, Wetton, Bruford, Palmer-James	15:44

The Road to Red, Discs 18 & 19 (Palace Theater, Providence, Rhode Island, 30 June 1974)
No.	Title	Writer(s)	Length
1.	"Walk On: No Pussyfooting"	Fripp, Eno	0:49
2.	"Larks' Tongues in Aspic (Part II)"	Fripp	6:22
3.	"Lament"	Fripp, Wetton, Palmer-James	4:39
4.	"Exiles"	Cross, Fripp, Wetton, Palmer-James	8:57
5.	"A Voyage to the Centre of the Cosmos" (Improv)	Cross, Fripp, Wetton, Bruford	15:03
6.	"Easy Money"	Fripp, Wetton, Palmer-James	6:41
7.	"Providence" (Improv)	Cross, Fripp, Wetton, Bruford	10:33
8.	"Fracture"	Fripp	11:29
9.	"Starless"	Cross, Fripp, Wetton, Bruford, Palmer-James	15:07
10.	"21st Century Schizoid Man"	Fripp, McDonald, Lake, Giles, Sinfield	9:23

The Road to Red, Disc 20 (Live in Central Park, NYC, 1 July 1974)
No.	Title	Writer(s)	Length
1.	"Walk On: No Pussyfooting"	Fripp, Eno	1:51
2.	"21st Century Schizoid Man"	Fripp, McDonald, Lake, Giles, Sinfield	7:45
3.	"Lament"	Fripp, Wetton, Palmer-James	4:41
4.	"Improv"	Cross, Fripp, Wetton, Bruford	1:28
5.	"Exiles"	Cross, Fripp, Wetton, Palmer-James	6:15
6.	"Cerberus" (Improv)	Cross, Fripp, Wetton, Bruford	8:17
7.	"Easy Money"	Fripp, Wetton, Palmer-James	6:16
8.	"Fracture" (Incomplete recording)	Fripp	11:05
9.	"Starless"	Cross, Fripp, Wetton, Bruford, Palmer-James	12:13
10.	"The Talking Drum"	Cross, Fripp, Wetton, Bruford, Muir	5:21
11.	"Larks' Tongues in Aspic (Part II)"	Fripp	6:44

The Road to Red, Disc 21 (a new Steven Wilson and Robert Fripp stereo mix of Red)
No.	Title	Writer(s)	Length
1.	"Red"	Robert Fripp	6:20
2.	"Fallen Angel"	Fripp, John Wetton, Richard Palmer-James	6:00
3.	"One More Red Nightmare"	Fripp, Wetton	7:07
4.	"Providence"	David Cross, Fripp, Wetton, Bill Bruford	8:08
5.	"Starless"	Cross, Fripp, Wetton, Bruford, Palmer-James	12:18

The Road to Red, Disc 22 (DVD audio disc)
No.	Title	Writer(s)	Length
1.	"Walk On: No Pussyfooting" (Casino Arena, Asbury Park, NJ 2013 Mix - LPCM Stereo (24/96))	Fripp/Eno
2.	"Larks’ Tongues In Aspic (Part II)" (Casino Arena, Asbury Park, NJ 2013 Mix - LPCM Stereo (24/96))	Fripp
3.	"Lament" (Casino Arena, Asbury Park, NJ 2013 Mix - LPCM Stereo (24/96))	Fripp/Wetton/Palmer-James
4.	"Exiles" (Casino Arena, Asbury Park, NJ 2013 Mix - LPCM Stereo (24/96))	Cross/Fripp/Wetton/Palmer-James
5.	"Improv: Asbury Park" (Casino Arena, Asbury Park, NJ 2013 Mix - LPCM Stereo (24/96))	Cross/Fripp/Wetton/Bruford
6.	"Easy Money" (Casino Arena, Asbury Park, NJ 2013 Mix - LPCM Stereo (24/96))	Fripp/Wetton/Palmer-James
7.	"Improv" (Casino Arena, Asbury Park, NJ 2013 Mix - LPCM Stereo (24/96))	Cross/Fripp/Wetton/Bruford
8.	"Fracture" (Casino Arena, Asbury Park, NJ 2013 Mix - LPCM Stereo (24/96))	Fripp
9.	"Starless" (Casino Arena, Asbury Park, NJ 2013 Mix - LPCM Stereo (24/96))	Cross/Fripp/Wetton/Bruford/Palmer-James
10.	"21st Century Schizoid Man" (Casino Arena, Asbury Park, NJ 2013 Mix - LPCM Stereo (24/96))	Fripp/McDonald/Lake/Giles/Sinfield
11.	"Walk On: No Pussyfooting" (Casino Arena, Asbury Park, NJ 2013 Mix - LPCM Stereo (24/48))	Fripp/Eno
12.	"Larks’ Tongues In Aspic (Part II)" (Casino Arena, Asbury Park, NJ 2013 Mix - LPCM Stereo (24/48))	Fripp
13.	"Lament" (Casino Arena, Asbury Park, NJ 2013 Mix - LPCM Stereo (24/48))	Fripp/Wetton/Palmer-James
14.	"Exiles" (Casino Arena, Asbury Park, NJ 2013 Mix - LPCM Stereo (24/48))	Cross/Fripp/Wetton/Palmer-James
15.	"Improv: Asbury Park" (Casino Arena, Asbury Park, NJ 2013 Mix - LPCM Stereo (24/48))	Cross/Fripp/Wetton/Bruford
16.	"Easy Money" (Casino Arena, Asbury Park, NJ 2013 Mix - LPCM Stereo (24/48))	Fripp/Wetton/Palmer-James
17.	"Improv" (Casino Arena, Asbury Park, NJ 2013 Mix - LPCM Stereo (24/48))	Cross/Fripp/Wetton/Bruford
18.	"Fracture" (Casino Arena, Asbury Park, NJ 2013 Mix - LPCM Stereo (24/48))	Fripp
19.	"Starless" (Casino Arena, Asbury Park, NJ 2013 Mix - LPCM Stereo (24/48))	Cross/Fripp/Wetton/Bruford/Palmer-James
20.	"21st Century Schizoid Man" (Casino Arena, Asbury Park, NJ 2013 Mix - LPCM Stereo (24/48))	Fripp/McDonald/Lake/Giles/Sinfield
21.	"Walk On: No Pussyfooting" (USA, 30th Anniversary Remaster - LPCM Stereo (24/48))	Fripp/Eno
22.	"Larks’ Tongues In Aspic (Part II)" (USA, 30th Anniversary Remaster - LPCM Stereo (24/48))	Fripp
23.	"Lament" (USA, 30th Anniversary Remaster - LPCM Stereo (24/48))	Fripp/Wetton/Palmer-James
24.	"Exiles" (USA, 30th Anniversary Remaster - LPCM Stereo (24/48))	Cross/Fripp/Wetton/Palmer-James
25.	"Improv: Asbury Park" (USA, 30th Anniversary Remaster - LPCM Stereo (24/48))	Cross/Fripp/Wetton/Bruford
26.	"Easy Money" (USA, 30th Anniversary Remaster - LPCM Stereo (24/48))	Fripp/Wetton/Palmer-James
27.	"21st Century Schizoid Man" (USA, 30th Anniversary Remaster - LPCM Stereo (24/48))	Fripp/McDonald/Lake/Giles/Sinfield
28.	"Fracture" (USA, 30th Anniversary Remaster - LPCM Stereo (24/48))	Fripp
29.	"Starless" (USA, 30th Anniversary Remaster - LPCM Stereo (24/48))	Cross/Fripp/Wetton/Bruford/Palmer-James
30.	"Larks’ Tongues In Aspic (Part II)" (USA, Original UK Vinyl Transfer - LPCM Stereo (24/96))	Fripp
31.	"Lament" (USA, Original UK Vinyl Transfer - LPCM Stereo (24/96))	Fripp/Wetton/Palmer-James
32.	"Exiles" (USA, Original UK Vinyl Transfer - LPCM Stereo (24/96))	Cross/Fripp/Wetton/Palmer-James
33.	"Asbury Park" (USA, Original UK Vinyl Transfer - LPCM Stereo (24/96))	Cross/Fripp/Wetton/Bruford
34.	"Easy Money" (USA, Original UK Vinyl Transfer - LPCM Stereo (24/96))	Fripp/Wetton/Palmer-James
35.	"21st Century Schizoid Man" (USA, Original UK Vinyl Transfer - LPCM Stereo (24/96))	Fripp/McDonald/Lake/Giles/Sinfield

The Road to Red, Disc 23 (Blu-ray audio 1 LPCM Stereo (24/192))
No.	Title	Writer(s)	Length
1.	"Walk On: No Pussyfooting" (Stanley Warner Theatre, Pittsburgh, PA)	Fripp/Eno
2.	"The Great Deceiver" (Stanley Warner Theatre, Pittsburgh, PA)	Wetton/Fripp/Palmer-James
3.	"Lament" (Stanley Warner Theatre, Pittsburgh, PA)	Fripp/Wetton/Palmer-James
4.	"Improv: Bartley Butsford" (Stanley Warner Theatre, Pittsburgh, PA)	Cross/Fripp/Wetton/Bruford
5.	"Exiles" (Stanley Warner Theatre, Pittsburgh, PA)	Cross/Fripp/Wetton/Palmer-James
6.	"Fracture" (Stanley Warner Theatre, Pittsburgh, PA)	Fripp
7.	"Easy Money" (Stanley Warner Theatre, Pittsburgh, PA)	Fripp/Wetton/Palmer-James
8.	"Improv: Daniel Dust" (Stanley Warner Theatre, Pittsburgh, PA)	Cross/Fripp/Wetton/Bruford
9.	"The Night Watch" (Stanley Warner Theatre, Pittsburgh, PA)	Fripp/Wetton/Palmer-James
10.	"Doctor Diamond" (Stanley Warner Theatre, Pittsburgh, PA)	Cross/Fripp/Wetton/Bruford/Palmer-James
11.	"Starless" (Stanley Warner Theatre, Pittsburgh, PA)	Cross/Fripp/Wetton/Bruford/Palmer-James
12.	"Improv: Wilton Carpet" (Stanley Warner Theatre, Pittsburgh, PA)	Cross/Fripp/Wetton/Bruford
13.	"The Talking Drum" (Stanley Warner Theatre, Pittsburgh, PA)	Cross/Fripp/Wetton/Bruford/Muir
14.	"Larks’ Tongues In Aspic (Part II)" (Stanley Warner Theatre, Pittsburgh, PA)	Fripp
15.	"21st Century Schizoid Man" (Stanley Warner Theatre, Pittsburgh, PA)	Fripp/McDonald/Lake/Giles/Sinfield
16.	"Walk On: No Pussyfooting" (Massey Hall, Toronto, Ontario)	Fripp/Eno
17.	"Larks’ Tongues In Aspic (Part II)" (Massey Hall, Toronto, Ontario)	Fripp
18.	"Lament" (Massey Hall, Toronto, Ontario)	Fripp/Wetton/Palmer-James
19.	"Exiles" (Massey Hall, Toronto, Ontario)	Cross/Fripp/Wetton/Palmer-James
20.	"Improv: The Golden Walnut" (Massey Hall, Toronto, Ontario)	Cross/Fripp/Wetton/Bruford
21.	"The Night Watch" (Massey Hall, Toronto, Ontario)	Fripp/Wetton/Palmer-James
22.	"Fracture" (Massey Hall, Toronto, Ontario)	Fripp
23.	"Improv: Clueless And Slightly Slack" (Massey Hall, Toronto, Ontario)	Cross/Fripp/Wetton/Bruford
24.	"Easy Money" (Massey Hall, Toronto, Ontario)	Fripp/Wetton/Palmer-James
25.	"Starless" (Massey Hall, Toronto, Ontario)	Cross/Fripp/Wetton/Bruford/Palmer-James
26.	"21st Century Schizoid Man" (Massey Hall, Toronto, Ontario)	Fripp/McDonald/Lake/Giles/Sinfield
27.	"Walk On: No Pussyfooting" (Penn State University, University Park, PA)	Fripp/Eno
28.	"Larks’ Tongues In Aspic (Part II)" (Penn State University, University Park, PA)	Fripp
29.	"Lament" (Penn State University, University Park, PA)	Fripp/Wetton/Palmer-James
30.	"Exiles" (Penn State University, University Park, PA)	Cross/Fripp/Wetton/Palmer-James
31.	"Improv: Is There Life Out There?" (Penn State University, University Park, PA)	Cross/Fripp/Wetton/Bruford
32.	"Easy Money" (Penn State University, University Park, PA)	Fripp/Wetton/Palmer-James
33.	"Improv: It Is For You, But Not For Us" (Penn State University, University Park, PA)	Cross/Fripp/Wetton/Bruford
34.	"Fracture" (Penn State University, University Park, PA)	Fripp
35.	"Starless" (Penn State University, University Park, PA)	Cross/Fripp/Wetton/Bruford/Palmer-James
36.	"Walk On: No Pussyfooting"
37.	Untitled (Palace Theatre, Providence, RI)	Fripp/Eno
38.	"Larks’ Tongues In Aspic (Part II)" (Palace Theatre, Providence, RI)	Fripp
39.	"Lament" (Palace Theatre, Providence, RI)	Fripp/Wetton/Palmer-James
40.	"Exiles" (Palace Theatre, Providence, RI)	Cross/Fripp/Wetton/Palmer-James
41.	"Improv: A Voyage To The Centre Of The Cosmos" (Palace Theatre, Providence, RI)	Cross/Fripp/Wetton/Bruford
42.	"Easy Money" (Palace Theatre, Providence, RI)	Fripp/Wetton/Palmer-James
43.	"Improv: Providence" (Palace Theatre, Providence, RI)	Cross/Fripp/Wetton/Bruford
44.	"Fracture" (Palace Theatre, Providence, RI)	Fripp
45.	"Starless" (Palace Theatre, Providence, RI)	Cross/Fripp/Wetton/Bruford/Palmer-James
46.	"21st Century Schizoid Man" (Palace Theatre, Providence, RI)	Fripp/McDonald/Lake/Giles/Sinfield

The Road to Red, Disc 24 (Blu-ray audio 2 LPCM Stereo (24/192))
No.	Title	Writer(s)	Length
1.	"Walk On: No Pussyfooting" (Casino Arena, Asbury Park, NJ 2013 Mix)	Fripp/Eno
2.	"Larks’ Tongues In Aspic (Part II)" (Casino Arena, Asbury Park, NJ 2013 Mix)	Fripp
3.	"Lament" (Casino Arena, Asbury Park, NJ 2013 Mix)	Fripp/Wetton/Palmer-James
4.	"Exiles" (Casino Arena, Asbury Park, NJ 2013 Mix)	Cross/Fripp/Wetton/Palmer-James
5.	"Improv: Asbury Park" (Casino Arena, Asbury Park, NJ 2013 Mix)	Cross/Fripp/Wetton/Bruford
6.	"Easy Money" (Casino Arena, Asbury Park, NJ 2013 Mix)	Fripp/Wetton/Palmer-James
7.	"Improv" (Casino Arena, Asbury Park, NJ 2013 Mix)	Cross/Fripp/Wetton/Bruford
8.	"Fracture" (Casino Arena, Asbury Park, NJ 2013 Mix)	Fripp
9.	"Starless" (Casino Arena, Asbury Park, NJ 2013 Mix)	Cross/Fripp/Wetton/Bruford/Palmer-James
10.	"21st Century Schizoid Man" (Casino Arena, Asbury Park, NJ 2013 Mix)	Fripp/McDonald/Lake/Giles/Sinfield
11.	"Walk On: No Pussyfooting" (Casino Arena, Asbury Park, NJ 2005 Mix)	Fripp/Eno
12.	"Larks’ Tongues In Aspic (Part II)" (Casino Arena, Asbury Park, NJ 2005 Mix)	Fripp
13.	"Lament" (Casino Arena, Asbury Park, NJ 2005 Mix)	Fripp/Wetton/Palmer-James
14.	"Exiles" (Casino Arena, Asbury Park, NJ 2005 Mix)	Cross/Fripp/Wetton/Palmer-James
15.	"Improv: Asbury Park" (Casino Arena, Asbury Park, NJ 2005 Mix)	Cross/Fripp/Wetton/Bruford
16.	"Easy Money" (Casino Arena, Asbury Park, NJ 2005 Mix)	Fripp/Wetton/Palmer-James
17.	"Improv" (Casino Arena, Asbury Park, NJ 2005 Mix)	Cross/Fripp/Wetton/Bruford
18.	"Fracture" (Casino Arena, Asbury Park, NJ 2005 Mix)	Fripp
19.	"Starless" (Casino Arena, Asbury Park, NJ 2005 Mix)	Cross/Fripp/Wetton/Bruford/Palmer-James
20.	"21st Century Schizoid Man" (Casino Arena, Asbury Park, NJ 2005 Mix)	Fripp/McDonald/Lake/Giles/Sinfield
21.	"Walk On: No Pussyfooting" (USA, 30th Anniversary Remaster - LPCM Stereo (24/96))	Fripp/Eno
22.	"Larks’ Tongues In Aspic (Part II)" (USA, 30th Anniversary Remaster - LPCM Stereo (24/96))	Fripp
23.	"Lament" (USA, 30th Anniversary Remaster - LPCM Stereo (24/96))	Fripp/Wetton/Palmer-James
24.	"Exiles" (USA, 30th Anniversary Remaster - LPCM Stereo (24/96))	Cross/Fripp/Wetton/Palmer-James
25.	"Improv: Asbury Park" (USA, 30th Anniversary Remaster - LPCM Stereo (24/96))	Cross/Fripp/Wetton/Bruford
26.	"Easy Money" (USA, 30th Anniversary Remaster - LPCM Stereo (24/96))	Fripp/Wetton/Palmer-James
27.	"21st Century Schizoid Man" (USA, 30th Anniversary Remaster - LPCM Stereo (24/96))	Fripp/McDonald/Lake/Giles/Sinfield
28.	"Fracture" (USA, 30th Anniversary Remaster - LPCM Stereo (24/96))	Fripp
29.	"Starless" (USA, 30th Anniversary Remaster - LPCM Stereo (24/96))	Cross/Fripp/Wetton/Bruford/Palmer-James
30.	"Larks’ Tongues In Aspic (Part II)" (USA, Original UK Vinyl Transfer - LPCM Stereo (24/96))	Fripp
31.	"Lament" (USA, Original UK Vinyl Transfer - LPCM Stereo (24/96))	Fripp/Wetton/Palmer-James
32.	"Exiles" (USA, Original UK Vinyl Transfer - LPCM Stereo (24/96))	Cross/Fripp/Wetton/Palmer-James
33.	"Asbury Park" (USA, Original UK Vinyl Transfer - LPCM Stereo (24/96))	Cross/Fripp/Wetton/Bruford
34.	"Easy Money" (USA, Original UK Vinyl Transfer - LPCM Stereo (24/96))	Fripp/Wetton/Palmer-James
35.	"21st Century Schizoid Man" (USA, Original UK Vinyl Transfer - LPCM Stereo (24/96))	Fripp/McDonald/Lake/Giles/Sinfield
36.	"Red" (Red The 2009 Surround Mix - DTS-HD Master Surround LPCM 5.1 Surround)	Fripp
37.	"Fallen Angel" (Red The 2009 Surround Mix - DTS-HD Master Surround LPCM 5.1 Surround)	Fripp/Wetton/Palmer-James
38.	"One More Red Nightmare" (Red The 2009 Surround Mix - DTS-HD Master Surround LPCM 5.1 Surround)	Fripp/Wetton
39.	"Providence" (Red The 2009 Surround Mix - DTS-HD Master Surround LPCM 5.1 Surround)	Cross/Fripp/Wetton/Bruford
40.	"Starless" (Red The 2009 Surround Mix - DTS-HD Master Surround LPCM 5.1 Surround)	Cross/Fripp/Wetton/Bruford/Palmer-James
41.	"Fallen Angel Trio Version (instrumental)" (Red The 2009 Surround Mix - Bonus studio track - DTS-HD Master Surround LPCM 5.1 Surround)	Fripp/Wetton
42.	"Providence" (Red The 2009 Surround Mix - Bonus live track - DTS-HD Master Surround LPCM 5.1 Surround)	Cross/Fripp/Wetton/Bruford
43.	"A Voyage To The Centre Of The Cosmos" (Red The 2009 Surround Mix - Bonus live track - DTS-HD Master Surround LPCM 5.1 Surround)	Cross/Fripp/Wetton/Bruford
44.	"Red" (Red 30th Anniversary Remaster - LPCM Stereo (24/96))	Fripp
45.	"Fallen Angel" (Red 30th Anniversary Remaster - LPCM Stereo (24/96))	Fripp/Wetton/Palmer-James
46.	"One More Red Nightmare" (Red 30th Anniversary Remaster - LPCM Stereo (24/96))	Fripp/Wetton
47.	"Providence" (Red 30th Anniversary Remaster - LPCM Stereo (24/96))	Cross/Fripp/Wetton/Bruford
48.	"Starless" (Red 30th Anniversary Remaster - LPCM Stereo (24/96))	Cross/Fripp/Wetton/Bruford/Palmer-James
49.	"Red" (Red 2013 Stereo Mix - LPCM Stereo (24/96))	Fripp
50.	"Fallen Angel" (Red 2013 Stereo Mix - LPCM Stereo (24/96))	Fripp/Wetton/Palmer-James
51.	"One More Red Nightmare" (Red 2013 Stereo Mix - LPCM Stereo (24/96))	Fripp/Wetton
52.	"Providence" (Red 2013 Stereo Mix - LPCM Stereo (24/96))	Cross/Fripp/Wetton/Bruford
53.	"Starless" (Red 2013 Stereo Mix - LPCM Stereo (24/96))	Cross/Fripp/Wetton/Bruford/Palmer-James
54.	"Red Trio Version" (Red 2013 Stereo Mix - Bonus studio track - LPCM Stereo (24/96))	Fripp
55.	"Fallen Angel Trio Version (instrumental)" (Red 2013 Stereo Mix - Bonus studio track - LPCM Stereo (24/96))	Fripp/Wetton

== Personnel ==
King Crimson

- David Cross – violin, Mellotron, Hohner Pianet (live material only)
- Robert Fripp – guitar, Mellotron, Hohner Pianet
- John Wetton – bass guitar, vocals
- Bill Bruford – drums, percussion

Additional personnel

- Richard Palmer-James – lyrics

Red studio musicians

- Mel Collins – soprano saxophone (5)
- Ian McDonald – alto saxophone (3, 5)
- Mark Charig – cornet (2)
- Robin Miller – oboe (2)
- uncredited – cello (1, 2, 5), double bass (5)
