= Frame by Frame =

Frame by Frame may refer to:

== Film and video ==
- Frame by Frame (film), a 2015 documentary about photographers in Afghanistan
- Frame by Frame, a 1996 film starring Brenda Bakke
- Frame by Frame, a video series and blog on film history and related topics by Wheeler Winston Dixon

== Music ==
=== Albums ===
- Frame by Frame (album), a 2013 album by country artist Cassadee Pope
- Frame by Frame: The Essential King Crimson, a 1991 4-CD compilation by King Crimson

=== Songs ===
- "Frame by Frame", a song by King Crimson from the album Discipline

== See also ==
- Animation
- Film frame
- Stop motion
- Frame (disambiguation)
