= The Great Deceiver (album) =

1992 Box Set by King Crimson

Live album by King Crimson
- Released: 16 November 1992
- Recorded: 23 October 1973 – 30 June 1974
- Genres: Progressive rock, experimental rock
- Length: 264:31
- Labels: E.G. Virgin
- Producer: Robert Fripp

King Crimson chronology
Three of a Perfect Pair (1984)	The Great Deceiver (1992)	Vrooom (1994)

Vol. 1 of 2007 double CD re-release
- The original release was a four-CD box set. It was re-released in 2007 as two double-disc sets.

Professional ratings
Review scores
Source	Rating
All About Jazz	5/5 stars
AllMusic	4.5/5 stars
Baltimore Sun	4/4 stars
Entertainment Weekly	B
Record Collector	3/5 stars

The Great Deceiver is a 4-CD box set by the band King Crimson, consisting of live recordings from 1973 and 1974, released on Virgin Records in 1992. In 2007, it was reissued on Fripp's Discipline Global Mobile label as two separate 2-CD sets, each featuring new artwork. The box set is titled after a song from the group's 1974 album Starless and Bible Black.

A follow-up to the previous year's Frame by Frame: The Essential King Crimson box set, The Great Deceiver features portions of concert recordings of the band from 1973 to 1974. All tracks are performed by the lineup of guitarist/keyboardist Robert Fripp, bassist/vocalist John Wetton, violinist/keyboardist David Cross and drummer Bill Bruford. Percussionist Jamie Muir left the band in early 1973, and hence is not featured on the set. The band's 30 June 1974 concert from Providence, Rhode Island is presented in its entirety on CDs 1 and 2; this was the second-to-last live concert ever performed by this incarnation of King Crimson.

== Background ==
King Crimson's "Walk On" music in 1973–74 found on disc one was an excerpt of "The Heavenly Music Corporation", from the album (No Pussyfooting) by Robert Fripp and Brian Eno. These "walk-ons" are reproduced here, and indexed as separate tracks.

Many of the recordings on this album are band improvisations. One such piece is "The Law of Maximum Distress", which was played in November 1973 at a performance in Zurich. The two discovered a break in the tape where the performance cut off after six and a half minutes and attributed this to the tape running out in the middle of the performance. This supposed incident gave the piece its title, a reference to Sod's law ("Whatever can go wrong will go wrong, at the worst possible moment"). As Robert Fripp noted in the CD jacket, "Most live recording follows the policy of two machines in use simultaneously to meet an eventuality such as this. We learn."

During the compiling of the 2009 Live in Zurich Collectors' Club release, Singleton discovered that King Crimson had severed the middle portion of "The Law of Maximum Distress" from the tapes and dubbed over it for "The Mincer", which was included on Starless and Bible Black. The complete track was later digitally reassembled and released in 2014, as part of the Starless box set.

The track "Exiles" is credited to Fripp/Wetton/Palmer-James on this box set. The correct credit, as listed on Larks' Tongues in Aspic and confirmed by BMI's records, is Cross/Fripp/Palmer-James. Despite having no legal co-writing credit for the song, John Wetton has indicated in interviews that he wrote the bridge for "Exiles."

Three recordings from this box set were previously available on other King Crimson albums, albeit in slightly altered forms. An abbreviated version of "We'll Let You Know" appears on the Starless and Bible Black album, released in 1974. Similarly, an abbreviated version of "Providence" was included on the Red album, also released in 1974. The live performance of "21st Century Schizoid Man" on CD Two was issued in 1975 as part of the album USA, featuring overdubbed violin from Eddie Jobson.

The liner notes to The Great Deceiver runs to 68 pages. These notes feature comments from Fripp, Wetton and Cross, annotated excerpts from Fripp's 1974 diary, reviews of the Frame by Frame box set, and a complete listing of all concerts performed by the band in 1973 and 1974.

== Track listing ==
=== Disc 1: Things Are Not as They Seem... ===
- Recorded at the Palace Theatre, Providence, Rhode Island, United States, 30 June 1974.
1. "Walk On ... No Pussyfooting" (Fripp, Eno) – 0:49
2. "Larks' Tongues in Aspic, Part Two" (Fripp) – 6:25
3. "Lament" (Fripp, Wetton, Palmer-James) – 4:38
4. "Exiles" (Cross, Fripp, Palmer-James) – 8:57
5. "Improv – A Voyage to the Centre of the Cosmos" (Cross, Fripp, Wetton, Bruford) – 15:03
6. "Easy Money" (Fripp, Wetton, Palmer-James) – 7:13
7. "Providence" (Cross, Fripp, Wetton, Bruford) – 10:18
8. "Fracture" (Fripp) – 11:14
9. "Starless" (Cross, Fripp, Wetton, Bruford, Palmer-James) – 12:03

=== Disc 2: Sleight of Hand (or Now You Don't See It Again) and... ===
- Tracks 1–2 recorded at the Palace Theatre, Providence, Rhode Island, United States, 30 June 1974.
- Tracks 3–12 recorded at the Glasgow Apollo, Glasgow, Scotland, UK, 23 October 1973.
- Tracks 13–14 recorded at Pennsylvania State University, State College, Pennsylvania, United States, 29 June 1974.

(Note: Only the first half of "The Night Watch" is taken from the Glasgow performance; the second half was taken from the Zurich show featured on CD Four. The liner notes indicate that there were technical problems with both recordings, and that the splice was done "to honour the spirit and sense of Glasgow's performance".)

1. "21st Century Schizoid Man" (Fripp, McDonald, Lake, Giles, Sinfield) – 8:01
2. "Walk off from Providence ... No Pussyfooting" (Fripp, Eno) – 1:21
3. "Walk on to Glasgow" – 0:48
4. "Sharks' Lungs in Lemsip" (Cross, Fripp, Wetton, Bruford) – 2:30
5. "Larks' Tongues in Aspic, Part One" (Cross, Fripp, Wetton, Bruford, Muir) – 7:50
6. "Book of Saturday" (Fripp, Wetton, Palmer-James) – 2:49
7. "Easy Money" (Fripp, Wetton, Palmer-James) – 6:40
8. "We'll Let You Know" (Cross, Fripp, Wetton, Bruford) – 4:55
9. "The Night Watch" (Fripp, Wetton, Palmer-James) – 5:16
10. "Improv – Tight Scrummy" (Cross, Fripp, Wetton, Bruford) – 8:57
11. "Peace – A Theme" (Fripp) – 1:01
12. "Cat Food" (Fripp, Sinfield, McDonald) – 4:31
13. "Easy Money..." (Fripp, Wetton, Palmer-James) – 2:17
14. "...It is for You, but Not for Us" (Cross, Fripp, Wetton, Bruford) – 7:57

=== Disc 3: ...Acts of Deception (the Magic Circus, or Weasels Stole Our Fruit) ===
- Tracks 1–11 recorded at the Stanley Warner Theatre, Pittsburgh, Pennsylvania United States, 29 April 1974.
- Tracks 12–13 recorded at Pennsylvania State University, State College, Pennsylvania, United States, 29 June 1974.
1. "Walk On ... No Pussyfooting" (Fripp, Eno) – 0:59
2. "The Great Deceiver" (Fripp, Wetton, Palmer-James) – 4:27
3. "Improv – Bartley Butsford" (Cross, Fripp, Wetton, Bruford) – 3:13
4. "Exiles" (Cross, Fripp, Palmer-James) – 7:19
5. "Improv – Daniel Dust" (Cross, Fripp, Wetton, Bruford) – 4:40
6. "The Night Watch" (Fripp, Wetton, Palmer-James) – 4:39
7. "Doctor Diamond" (Cross, Wetton, Fripp, Bruford, Palmer-James) – 5:11
8. "Starless" (Cross, Fripp, Wetton, Bruford, Palmer-James) – 12:26
9. "Improv – Wilton Carpet" (Cross, Fripp, Wetton, Bruford) – 5:52
10. "The Talking Drum" (Cross, Fripp, Wetton, Bruford, Muir) – 5:29
11. "Larks' Tongues in Aspic, Part Two" (abbreviated) (Fripp) – 2:57
12. "Applause and announcement" – 2:12
13. "Improv – Is There Life Out There?" (Cross, Fripp, Wetton, Bruford) – 12:01

=== Disc 4: ...But Neither Are They Otherwise ===
- Tracks 1–4 recorded at Massey Hall, Toronto, Ontario, Canada, 24 June 1974.
- Tracks 5–12 recorded at the Volkshaus, Zurich, Switzerland, 15 November 1973.
1. "Improv – The Golden Walnut" (Cross, Fripp, Wetton, Bruford) – 11:45
2. "The Night Watch" (Fripp, Wetton, Palmer-James) – 4:37
3. "Fracture" (Fripp) – 11:52
4. "Improv – Clueless and Slightly Slack" (Cross, Fripp, Wetton, Bruford) – 8:14
5. "Walk On ... No Pussyfooting" (Fripp, Eno) – 0:52
6. "Improv – Some Pussyfooting" (Cross, Fripp, Wetton, Bruford) – 2:28
7. "Larks' Tongues in Aspic, Part One" (Cross, Fripp, Wetton, Bruford, Muir) – 8:16
8. "Improv – The Law of Maximum Distress, Part One" (Bruford, Cross, Fripp, Wetton) – 6:32
9. "Improv – The Law of Maximum Distress, Part Two" (Bruford, Cross, Fripp, Wetton) – 2:34
10. "Easy Money" (Fripp, Wetton, Palmer-James) – 7:32
11. "Improv – Some More Pussyfooting" (Cross, Fripp, Wetton, Bruford) – 5:53
12. "The Talking Drum" (Cross, Fripp, Wetton, Bruford, Muir) – 6:03

== Personnel ==
King Crimson

- David Cross – violin, viola, Mellotron, Hohner Pianet
- Robert Fripp – electric guitar, Mellotron, Hohner Pianet
- John Wetton – bass guitar, vocals
- Bill Bruford – drums, percussion

Additional personnel

- Executive producer: Robert Fripp
- Mixing by Fripp, Tony Arnold and David Singleton
- Design (original 1992 release): Bill Smith Studio
- Photography (original 1992 release): The Douglas Brothers
- Design (2007 reissue): Hugh O'Donnell
- Cover paintings (2007 reissue): P.J. Crook

== Charts ==
Chart (1992)	Peak position
Japanese Albums (Oricon)	68
