= Starless and Bible Black =

1974 studio album / live album by King Crimson

Studio album / live album by King Crimson
- Released: 29 March 1974
- Recorded: 23 October, 15 and 23 November 1973 (live); January 1974 (studio)
- Venue: Apollo Theatre, Glasgow; Volkshaus, Zürich; Concertgebouw, Amsterdam
- Studios: AIR, London
- Genres: Progressive rock; experimental rock; free improvisation
- Length: 46:41
- Labels: Island; Atlantic
- Producer: King Crimson

King Crimson chronology
Larks' Tongues in Aspic (1973)	Starless and Bible Black (1974)	Red (1974)

Singles from Starless and Bible Black
- 1. "The Night Watch" Released: 22 March 1974

Starless and Bible Black is the sixth studio album by the English progressive rock band King Crimson, released in March 1974 by Island Records in the United Kingdom and by Atlantic Records in the United States. It features most of the personnel which appeared on the group's preceding album, Larks' Tongues in Aspic, with only percussionist Jamie Muir not returning, and is the band's final album with violinist David Cross as a member, although he would appear on one track on Red. Much of the album was recorded live and edited together with studio recordings and overdubs. The album includes multiple fully improvised pieces.

== Background and production ==
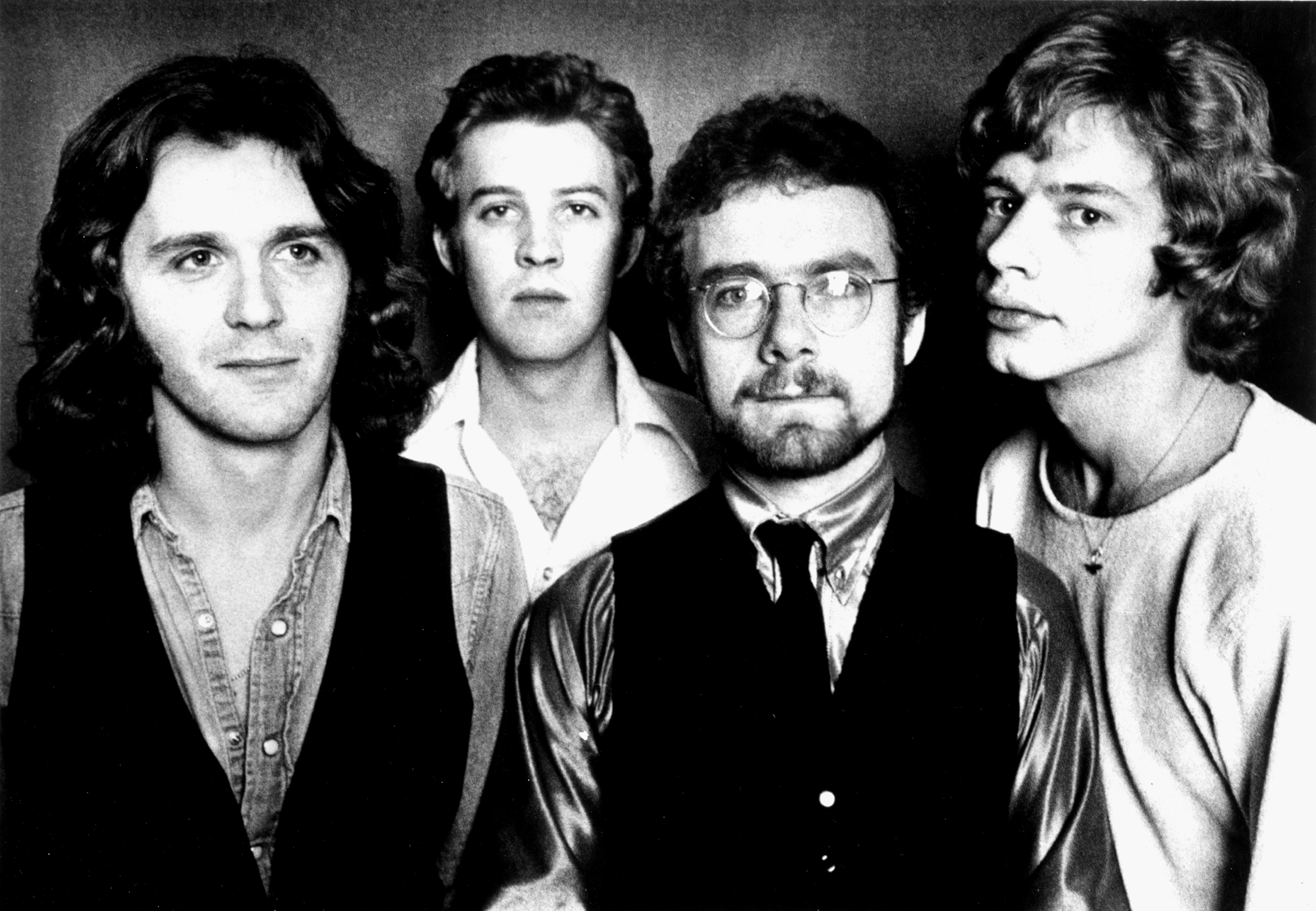
King Crimson in 1974. From left: John Wetton, David Cross, Robert Fripp and Bill Bruford.

King Crimson's previous album, Larks' Tongues in Aspic (on which they had moved decisively away from a more traditional progressive rock sound drawing on American jazz, and towards the influence of European free improvisation), had been recorded by a quintet lineup including percussionist Jamie Muir. Early in 1973, Muir abruptly left the band, ostensibly due to an onstage injury, but in fact to retire from music and join a monastery (something that was not communicated to his bandmates at that time). Bill Bruford subsequently absorbed Muir's percussion role in addition to his own kit drumming, and the band continued to tour as a quartet.

These upheavals and the pressure of touring left King Crimson short of new written material when it came to the time to record their next album. Having increased their level of onstage improvisation during recent tours, the band opted to take advantage of this to solve the problem. New compositions tried out in concert and captured on several live recordings were presented as part of the new album material, alternating and in some cases blending with studio recordings.

The only songs recorded entirely in the studio were "The Great Deceiver" and "Lament". "We'll Let You Know" was an entirely improvised piece recorded in Glasgow. "The Mincer" was a section of another improvised piece recorded in concert at the Volkshaus in Zurich, with Wetton's vocals later overdubbed. The other parts of this improvisation were released on the box set The Great Deceiver as "The Law of Maximum Distress, Parts One & Two". "Trio", "Starless and Bible Black" and "Fracture", the last of which Robert Fripp has cited as one of the most difficult pieces he has ever played, were recorded live at the Concertgebouw in Amsterdam. The introduction to "The Night Watch" was recorded at this same performance, but the band's Mellotron broke down during the performance, meaning that the remainder of the song needed to be recorded in the studio. Live applause was removed from the recordings wherever possible. The complete Amsterdam concert was released in 1997 as The Night Watch.

Bruford spent the entirety of "Trio" with his drumsticks crossed over his chest, waiting for the right moment to join in, but eventually realized that the piece was progressing better without him. His decision not to add any percussion was seen by the rest of the band as a crucial choice, and so he received co-writing credit. "Trio" was later included on the 1975 compilation album A Young Person's Guide to King Crimson, the performance credits of which cite Bruford's contribution to the piece as "admirable restraint."

The track "FraKctured" from the band's 2000 album The ConstruKction of Light serves as a sequel to "Fracture".

== Music and lyrics ==
Only four tracks on the album have lyrics; as with Larks' Tongues in Aspic, these were written by John Wetton's friend Richard Palmer-James. "The Great Deceiver" refers to Satan and is an ironic comment on commercialism; Fripp contributed the line "cigarettes, ice cream, figurines of the Virgin Mary" after seeing souvenirs being marketed in Vatican City. "Lament" is about fame. "The Night Watch" reflects on Rembrandt's painting of the same name. "The Mincer" has more ambiguous lyrics, though lines such as "fingers reaching, linger shrieking", "you're all alone, baby's breathing", and the song's title could be references to a home invader or killer. Original issues of the album include the lyrics to "The Great Deceiver", "Lament" and "The Night Watch" on the album's inner sleeve.

The phrase "Starless and Bible Black" is a quotation from the first two lines of Dylan Thomas' radio drama Under Milk Wood. The band's next album, Red, contains a song called "Starless", which contains the phrase, whereas "Starless and Bible Black" from this album is an edit of an improvised instrumental from the Amsterdam performance.

The album art is by painter Tom Phillips. The phrase "this night wounds time", which appears on the back cover, is a quotation from Phillips' A Humument.

== Reception ==
Professional ratings
Review scores
Source	Rating
AllMusic	4.5/5 stars
Christgau's Record Guide	B
Encyclopedia of Popular Music	3/5 stars
The Great Rock Discography	8/10
Mojo	4/5 stars
MusicHound Rock: The Essential Album Guide	3/5 stars
Rolling Stone	favourable
The Rolling Stone Album Guide	3.5/5 stars

Rolling Stone called the album "as stunningly powerful as In the Court of the Crimson King", particularly praising the performances of Bruford and Cross, and finding the variety of tones and lengthy instrumental improvisations particularly impressive. They concluded: "Fripp has finally assembled the band of his dreams – hopefully it'll stay together long enough to continue producing albums as excellent as this one."

Robert Christgau's review was more ambiguous, deeming it "as close as this chronically interesting group has ever come to a good album", though he would eventually give higher ratings to Red and the live album USA.

AllMusic also praised the album's variety of tones in their retrospective review, and remarked that the album's second side "threw the group's hardest sounds right in the face of the listener, and gained some converts in the process."

== Legacy ==
In 2004, Pitchfork ranked it at number 94 in their list of the "Top 100 Albums of the 1970s."

The Japanese band Acid Mothers Temple recorded an album entitled Starless and Bible Black Sabbath in 2006, referencing Starless and Bible Black and Black Sabbath's 1970 self-titled album.

== Track listing ==
Side one
No.	Title	Writer(s)	Length
1.	"The Great Deceiver"	Robert Fripp, John Wetton, Richard Palmer-James	4:02
2.	"Lament"	Fripp, Wetton, Palmer-James	4:00
3.	"We'll Let You Know" (instrumental)	David Cross, Fripp, Wetton, Bill Bruford	3:46
4.	"The Night Watch"	Fripp, Wetton, Palmer-James	4:37
5.	"Trio" (instrumental)	Cross, Fripp, Wetton, Bruford	5:41
6.	"The Mincer"	Cross, Fripp, Wetton, Bruford, Palmer-James	4:10
Total length:			26:16

Side two
No.	Title	Writer(s)	Length
1.	"Starless and Bible Black" (instrumental)	Cross, Fripp, Wetton, Bruford	9:11
2.	"Fracture" (instrumental)	Fripp	11:14
Total length:			20:25

== Personnel ==
King Crimson

- Robert Fripp – electric guitar, Mellotron, Hohner Pianet, devices, production
- John Wetton – bass guitar, vocals, additional guitar (1), production
- David Cross – violin, viola, Mellotron, Hohner Pianet, production
- Bill Bruford – drums, percussion, production

Additional personnel

- George Chkiantz – recording engineer
- Peter Henderson – engineering assistance
- Tom Phillips – cover design
- "Equipment by Chris and Tex"

== Charts ==
Chart (1974)	Peak position
Australian Albums (Kent Music Report)	73
Canada Top Albums/CDs (RPM)	75
French Albums (SNEP)	8
Italian Albums (Musica e Dischi)	7
Japanese Albums (Oricon)	38
UK Albums (Official Charts)	28
US Billboard 200	64

Chart (2011)	Peak position
UK Independent Albums (Official Charts)	49
