= Fergus Hall =

Scottish artist

Fergus Hall is a Scottish artist, whose work has been exhibited, at among other venues, the Portal Gallery in London.

== Early life ==
Hall is a native of Paisley in Scotland.

== Career ==
Hall is a painter, illustrator and high school teacher. He is best known for the original tarot that he created for James Bond film Live and Let Die. His tarot deck, the James Bond "Tarot of the Witches" has been issued in several incarnations, with a guide book by tarot aficionado and author, Stuart Kaplan.

Hall's paintings have been published on two LP sleeves (A Young Person's Guide to King Crimson and The Compact King Crimson) for the group King Crimson, and these three paintings ("The Landscape Player", "Earth" and "Il Divino") were bought by Robert Fripp from the Portal gallery during the mid-1970s.

During this time, while working on the film tarot, he was a teacher at St. Aelred's Junior High in Glenburn, Paisley; he later worked as an art teacher at Trinity High School, Renfrew and St. Cuthbert's High School, Johnstone.

In 1982 his children's book Groundsel was published by Jonathan Cape and won a prize for best picture book in Japan.
