= The Night Watch (album) =

Live album by King Crimson
- Released: 17 October 1997
- Recorded: 23 November 1973
- Venue: Concertgebouw, Amsterdam, Netherlands
- Genre: Progressive rock, heavy metal, hard rock, free improvisation
- Length: 84:34
- Label: Discipline Global Mobile
- Producer: Robert Fripp and David Singleton

King Crimson chronology
Epitaph (1997)	The Night Watch (1997)	Absent Lovers: Live in Montreal (1998)

Professional ratings
Review scores
Source	Rating
Allmusic	4/5 stars

The Night Watch is a live album (2-CD set) by the English progressive rock band King Crimson, recorded in Amsterdam in November 1973 and released in 1997.

== Contents ==
This album contains an important performance in King Crimson's career, being the source of the improvisations "Trio" and "Starless and Bible Black", the Fripp instrumental "Fracture" and the intro to the song "The Night Watch", all of which were included, with some editing, on the 1974 album Starless and Bible Black. Prerecorded excerpts of (No Pussyfooting) appear at the end of "21st Century Schizoid Man" similarly to what was included at the beginning of USA.

== Production ==
The concert was performed on 23 November 1973 at the Concertgebouw in Amsterdam, the Netherlands. Most of the concert was also broadcast live by the BBC and taped by listeners; bootlegs of the broadcast circulated among fans. The concert began with a version of "Larks' Tongues in Aspic (Part I)", a recording which has never been found. Some bootlegs claim to have it, but these are recordings from other sources. It was one of the first releases of archival recordings by Discipline Global Mobile, the record label founded by Robert Fripp and David Singleton.

== Art ==
Like the covers of many King Crimson albums, The Night Watch's cover features a painting by P. J. Crook, which is also entitled The Nightwatch. The sleeve was designed by the Bill Smith Studio of London.

== Track listing ==
=== Disc 1 ===
1. "Easy Money" (Fripp, Wetton, Palmer-James) – 6:14
2. "Lament" (Fripp, Wetton, Palmer-James) – 4:14
3. "Book of Saturday" (Fripp, Wetton, Palmer-James) – 4:07
4. "Fracture" (Fripp) – 11:28
5. "The Night Watch" (Fripp, Wetton, Palmer-James) – 5:28
6. "Improvisation: Starless and Bible Black" (Cross, Fripp, Wetton, Bruford) – 9:11

=== Disc 2 ===
1. "Improvisation: Trio" (Cross, Fripp, Wetton, Bruford) – 6:09
2. "Exiles" (Cross, Fripp, Wetton, Palmer-James) – 6:37
3. "Improvisation: The Fright Watch" (Cross, Fripp, Wetton, Bruford) – 6:03
4. "The Talking Drum" (Cross, Fripp, Wetton, Bruford, Muir) – 6:34
5. "Larks' Tongues in Aspic (Part II)" (Fripp) – 7:51
6. "21st Century Schizoid Man" (Fripp, McDonald, Lake, Giles, Sinfield) – 10:38

== Personnel ==
King Crimson

- David Cross – violin, viola, Mellotron, Hohner Pianet
- Robert Fripp – electric guitar, Mellotron, Hohner Pianet
- John Wetton – bass guitar, vocals
- Bill Bruford – drums, percussion

Production personnel

- George Chkiantz – recording engineer
- David Singleton and Robert Fripp – mixing
- David Singleton – mixing and mastering engineer
- Alex R. Mundy – assistant engineer
- P.J. Crook – cover artwork
- Bill Smith Studio – design

== Charts ==
Chart (1997)	Peak position
Japanese Albums (Oricon)	61
