= Moonchild (King Crimson song) =

Song by King Crimson

from the album In the Court of the Crimson King
- Released: 12 October 1969
- Recorded: 31 July 1969
- Genre: Progressive rock; avant-garde; art rock; free improvisation
- Length: 12:13 (album version): 9:02 (2009 remix, edited version)
- Label: Atlantic
- Composers: Robert Fripp; Ian McDonald; Greg Lake; Michael Giles
- Lyricist: Peter Sinfield
- Producer: King Crimson

"Moonchild" is the fourth track from British progressive rock band King Crimson's debut album, In the Court of the Crimson King.

After having been rehearsed in 2013–2014 by King Crimson VIII, the song made its live debut after 48 years on 18 October 2017 in Austin, Texas.

== Composition ==
The first section, "The Dream", is a mellotron-driven ballad, but after two and a half minutes it changes to a completely free-form instrumental improvisation by Fripp, Giles and McDonald (called "The Illusion"), which lasts until the end of the song. At 9:50 min., Fripp played a twelve-second passage reminiscent of The Surrey with the Fringe on Top. In the 2009 remix of the album, the track was edited by Fripp and colleague Steven Wilson, with around 2:50 minutes of the original improvisation (the reference by Fripp to "The Surrey With the Fringe on Top") being removed. This issue of the album does, however, offer the original version as a bonus track.

The song contains drummer Michael Giles performing a unique alternation between the ride cymbals, which was praised by music critics and writers. The song was described as a "space jam." Giles describes the radical "Moonchild" as "an opportunity. We had recorded the material that we wanted to be on the album, so we thought, why not record something that is not improvisation in a jazz way, but is free of structure? You are just dealing with time and space. Music, of all the art forms, is just abstract; you can't pick it up or hold it, or put it on the wall. We started off with this little ditty and then we just took off into outer space, into nothingness, to see what happened. If it had been rubbish we wouldn't have left it on there. I keep looking at the other side of things. What about if we hadn't done it? What about if it wasn't there?"

"What is rarely ever mentioned about In the Court of the Crimson King is that a quarter of its running time is given over to free improvisation," writes Mike Barnes in his book A New Day Yesterday: UK Progressive Rock & the 70s (2020), adding: "'Moonchild' rarely got more than a passing mention in contemporary reviews and is still barely mentioned in more recent commentaries. One gets the feeling that it was a track that some listeners would skip – in the way that Beatles fans might have passed on 'Revolution 9' – but in its own contemplative way, 'Moonchild' was both beautifully played and the most adventurous track by a British rock group to date."

The song was used in the 1998 movie Buffalo '66, in the scene in which Christina Ricci tap dances at the bowling alley.

== Personnel ==
- Robert Fripp – electric guitar
- Ian McDonald – Mellotron, vibraphone, woodwind
- Greg Lake – vocals
- Michael Giles – drums, percussion
- Peter Sinfield – lyrics

== Sources ==
- Barker, David (2006). 33 1/3 Greatest Hits, Volume 1. Continuum International Publishing Group. ISBN 0826419038.
- Everett, Walter (2008). The Foundations of Rock : From "Blue Suede Shoes" to "Suite: Judy Blue Eyes": From "Blue Suede Shoes" to "Suite: Judy Blue Eyes". Oxford University Press. ISBN 978-0199718702.
- Macan, Edward (1997). Rocking the Classics: English Progressive Rock and the Counterculture. Oxford University Press. ISBN 0195098870.
- Martin, Bill (1998). Listening to the Future: The Time of Progressive Rock, 1968-1978. Open Court Publishing. ISBN 081269368X.
- Smith, Chris (2009). One Hundred One Albums that Changed Popular Music. Oxford University Press. ISBN 978-0195373714.
