= Red (King Crimson album) =

Studio album by King Crimson
- Released: 7 October 1974
- Recorded: 30 June 1974 (Note: "Providence" only); 8 July – August 1974
- Venues: Palace Theater, Providence
- Studios: Olympic, London
- Genres: Progressive rock; progressive metal; heavy metal
- Length: 39:57
- Labels: Island; Atlantic
- Producer: King Crimson

King Crimson chronology
Starless and Bible Black (1974)	Red (1974)	USA (1975)

King Crimson studio chronology
Starless and Bible Black (1974)	Red (1974)	Discipline (1981)

Red is the seventh studio album by the English progressive rock band King Crimson, released on 7 October 1974 on Island Records in the United Kingdom and Atlantic Records in North America and Japan. The album was recorded at Olympic Studios in London in July and August 1974, and produced by the band themselves.

Red is a progressive rock album with a noticeably heavier sound than their previous albums; it was later called one of the 50 "heaviest albums of all time" by Q. This was achieved with the performances of just three band members: guitarist and keyboardist Robert Fripp, bassist and vocalist John Wetton and drummer Bill Bruford. The dense sound of the album was created through multiple guitar and keyboard overdubs and guest appearances by musicians including former King Crimson members Ian McDonald and Mel Collins on saxophones, classical oboist Robin Miller and English jazz trumpeter Mark Charig. Many of the album's motifs were conceived during the band's live improvisations. The track "Providence" was edited down from an improvisation recorded by the previous lineup of the band, with violinist and keyboardist David Cross in addition to Fripp, Wetton and Bruford, at a live performance in Providence, Rhode Island; Cross had been fired from the band by the time the album sessions began. "Starless" was written for their previous album, Starless and Bible Black (1974), but was considered too primitive to be released at the time; the lengthy version included on Red was refined and performed during concerts throughout 1974. The lyrics describe anxiety, tension, violence, entrapment and existential dread, reflecting the band's internal turmoil and impending breakup.

Fripp disbanded King Crimson roughly two weeks before the release of the album. Red became their lowest-charting album at that time, spending only one week in the UK Albums Chart at No. 45 and in the US Billboard 200 at No. 66. However, it was well received among fans and critics. It has received further praise retrospectively, being recognised as one of the band's best works, and has been reissued many times.

== Background and recording ==
Near the conclusion of King Crimson's 1974 tour of the US and Canada, the decision was made to ask violinist and keyboardist David Cross to leave the band. EG, the band's management, urged Fripp not to tell Cross until after the final date of the tour, but he would not have been able to do this anyway as Fripp would not return from the US until after Cross arrived in Europe. Fripp agreed that EG management would tell Cross, "on proviso that [Cross] was told that I objected to not telling him personally." However, EG failed to inform Cross at all, waiting until 7 July, the day before the recording of Red began.

With the exception of "Providence", which had been recorded live during the tour, Red was recorded in July and August 1974 at Studio 2 of Olympic Studios in Barnes, London. The band reunited with recording engineer George Chkiantz, who had previously worked with them on Starless and Bible Black. Chkiantz remembered Fripp placing himself and his guitar amplifier in the drummer's booth, "sitting on a stool with the light off, quite possibly with the door pulled to, basically playing when the stuff was counted in." Once Bruford was no longer needed in the studio, he cycled home, leaving Wetton and Chkiantz to record the vocals. With the backing tracks put down, the band brought back several contributors to past albums in Cross's stead: Robin Miller on oboe, Mark Charig on cornet, former King Crimson members Ian McDonald and Mel Collins on saxophones, and multiple uncredited players on cello and double bass.

On Red, King Crimson followed in the direction established by its predecessors Larks' Tongues in Aspic (1973) and Starless and Bible Black (1974). However, in contrast to those albums, Red features a more "layered" production, characterized by guitar and keyboard overdubs and the use of McDonald and Collins as session musicians. The rhythm section of Wetton and Bruford, whom Fripp referred to as "a flying brick wall", led the album's style towards heavy metal. Fripp, increasingly unsure of the group's direction, took a "backseat" when making large decisions during the sessions, leaving them to Wetton and Bruford; the two believed Fripp was merely "pulling another moody", but in the week prior to recording Red, Fripp had discovered the works of mystic John G. Bennett and decided to take "a year's sabbatical ... at Bennett's Institute" afterwards. He offered the idea of McDonald rejoining the band in his absence to EG; in light of the label's lack of interest in this idea, Fripp abruptly disbanded King Crimson on 24 September. Red was released two weeks later.

== Music and lyrics ==
Much of the material on Red has origins in the band's live improvisations. Motifs that would eventually be used for "Fallen Angel" were first played by Fripp in 1972 as part of improvisations performed with the quintet line-up that recorded Larks' Tongues in Aspic; these improvisations are documented as "Fallen Angel" and "Fallen Angel Hullabaloo" on the Larks' Tongues in Aspic: The Complete Recordings box set and in standalone releases of their respective concerts. The song also used the chorus of a then-unreleased ballad by Wetton, "Woman", as an instrumental passage. Wetton later released the complete song on his first solo album, Caught in the Crossfire, in 1980.

The distinctive introduction to "One More Red Nightmare" was deployed by Wetton and Fripp in various improvisations throughout 1974, which can be heard in the Starless and The Road to Red box sets. "Providence" was edited down from a recording of an improvisation on 30 June 1974 at the Palace Theater in Providence, Rhode Island. It was released in its uncut form as "Improv: Providence" on several subsequent releases, such as the 1992 The Great Deceiver live box set and the 40th-anniversary edition of Red.

The opening instrumental "Red" was composed solely by Fripp. Composer Andrew Keeling described it as "one of the more muscular pieces of Robert Fripp's, in particular the deployment of open strings and heavily attacked and syncopated bass and drums." In an online diary from 2012, Fripp wrote about its development: "A motif; moved from [the missing piece] 'Blue' to 'Red': the opening and closing theme of 'Red' itself. The driving, relentless figure that follows it, and the middle figure played by the basses, weren't enough for a complete piece." Fripp recalled that once the track was recorded, "We played it back and Bill said, 'I don't get it, but if you tell me it's good, I trust you.' ... I said, 'We don't have to use it.' John was in no doubt: 'We'll use it.'" An unused variation of the song's middle section would later emerge in the rehearsals for Three of a Perfect Pair (1984), as later collected on Rehearsals & Blows, and finally saw light as part of "VROOOM VROOOM" on THRAK (1995).

"Starless" was originally written by Wetton, with the intent of it being the title track for Starless and Bible Black. At the time, the piece consisted only of the vocal section of the song, and Wetton claims that it got a "cold reception" from Fripp and Bruford. Fripp later wrote an introductory theme performed on violin by Cross, and two additional sections were added after Wetton's contributions, one being contributed by Bruford. The final section reprises various themes heard earlier in the song and reuses a bass part written for the Starless and Bible Black track "Fracture". This early arrangement of "Fracture" can be heard on the Starless box set, as well as the standalone releases of various concerts. The lyrics, co-written by Wetton and lyricist Richard Palmer-James, went through several iterations, with Wetton later including an unused verse in the U.K. track "Caesar's Palace Blues". Since the title "Starless and Bible Black" had already been used on the previous album, the song's title was shortened to "Starless". The track has been described as "Brooding and heavy, fraught with feeling and foreboding." According to Sean Murphy of PopMatters, "it’s an exercise in precision, the apotheosis of their 'dread and release' formula. It builds an almost unbearable tension, breaking at last through the darkness; less like the tide retreating and more like an ocean disintegrating into the air."

== Packaging and album name ==
During the mixing stage, ideas for the album's title and artwork were discussed. The needles on the VU meters on the studio's mixing desk were observed to be "bouncing and crashing sharply into the red"; for Wetton, this symbolised the direction of the band's music and was to influence the planned front cover of Red. However, EG suggested that a group photograph would be easier to sell, particularly for the American market. EG director Mark Fenwick pitched to hire John Kosh, who subsequently commissioned Gered Mankowitz to produce photographs of the meters (for the album's back cover) and the group, but tensions within the group led to each member being photographed alone and being combined into a composite. The resulting cover's chiaroscuro style has been compared to that of the Beatles' 1963 album With the Beatles; Fripp recalled that "I loathed the session and was ill at ease with all of it."

The album's lyrics were not originally included as part of the packaging, unlike all previous King Crimson studio albums. The first printing of the lyrics would occur in a 2000 reissue.

== Release and reception ==
Professional ratings
Review scores
Source	Rating
AllMusic	4.5/5 stars
Christgau's Record Guide	A−
Classic Rock	8/10 stars
Encyclopedia of Popular Music	4/5 stars
The Great Rock Discography	8/10
Mojo	5/5 stars
MusicHound	5/5 stars
Pitchfork	9.0/10
The Rolling Stone Album Guide	4.5/5 stars
Sputnikmusic	5/5 stars
DownBeat	/

Released in October 1974, Red spent only one week on the British charts, at No. 45, whereas all the band's previous studio albums had reached the top 30. In the United States, it reached No. 66 on the Billboard 200. However, it remained popular with fans and critics. Critic Robert Christgau applauded the album despite having been critical of the group's past work; he deemed it "grand, powerful, grating, and surprisingly lyrical" and commented that it "does for classical-rock fusion what John McLaughlin's Devotion did for jazz-rock fusion." Alan Heineman of DownBeat was more reserved in his assessment; he praised side B, claiming it's "almost as strong and interesting as their earliest albums", but dismissed side A as "more boring than King Crimson has ever been." At the time of release, Sounds reporter Steve Peacock believed the group disbanding was merely a marketing ploy to boost sales.

Retrospective reviews were resoundingly positive. Bruce Eder of AllMusic declared Red to be weaker than its two predecessors, but nonetheless a superlative work: "few intact groups could have gotten an album as good as Red together. The fact that it was put together by a band in its death throes makes it all the more impressive an achievement." Greg Kot of The Chicago Tribune praised Red as "progressive rock's finest hour" in 1997. A Classic Rock reviewer considered it "a walk down a lightless corridor and an unhappy and ferocious counterbalance to the frolics of King Crimson's beginnings" and "laden with heavily distorted sections and a decidedly melancholic vibe". In 2023, Sean Murphy of PopMatters wrote that "If ever a rock album could be said to invoke Poe's famous 'unity of effect' theory, Red remains one of the most fully felt, affecting artistic statements in the genre."

Like most of King Crimson's catalogue, Red has been re-released numerous times. First issued on compact disc in 1986, it has also been released as part of the "Definitive Edition" series in 1989 and the "30th Anniversary Edition" series in 1999. In 2009, Red, In the Court of the Crimson King and Lizard were chosen to launch the band's "40th Anniversary Edition" series, in which each album was presented in a CD/DVD-A package with new stereo and 5.1 surround sound mixes by Steven Wilson; unlike the other editions in the series, however, Red launched with no new stereo mix. In 2013, Wilson and Fripp created a new stereo mix for The Road to Red box set, which was also issued separately as part of a 2-CD package. On 25 October 2024, a 50th Anniversary Edition was released on vinyl, CD/Blu-ray and digital formats, with a new elemental mix by David Singleton, which included elements not on the original mixes, and both a new stereo and Dolby Atmos remix by Steven Wilson. Also included were session tracks detailing the creation of "Starless".

== Legacy ==
In 2001, Q magazine named Red as one of the "50 Heaviest Albums of All Time" and Pitchfork ranked Red number 72 in its "Top 100 Albums of the 1970s" list, stating: "For a band that was very obviously about to splinter, King Crimson's music sounds remarkably of a single mind. On Red, they achieved a remarkable balance between bone-crushing brutality and cerebral complexity." Rolling Stone ranked the album at number 15 on their 2015 list of the 50 best progressive rock albums of all time.

The title track was also ranked as the twentieth best progressive rock song of all time by PopMatters, as well as number 87 in Rolling Stone's list of "The 100 Greatest Guitar Songs". Red has been regarded as being highly influential to the development of avant-garde metal and math rock. Nirvana frontman Kurt Cobain mentioned Red as an influence on the band's 1993 album In Utero.

In 2023, Sean Murphy of PopMatters referred to "Starless" as "one of the all-time progressive rock masterworks." The track is played over the opening titles of the 2018 horror film Mandy.

== Track listing ==
Side one
No.	Title	Lyrics	Music	Length
1.	"Red"	(instrumental)	Robert Fripp	6:20
2.	"Fallen Angel"	John Wetton; Richard Palmer-James	Fripp; John Wetton	6:03
3.	"One More Red Nightmare"	Wetton	Wetton; Fripp	7:08
Total length:				19:31

Side two
No.	Title	Lyrics	Music	Length
1.	"Providence" (instrumental)	(instrumental)	Fripp; Wetton; Bill Bruford; David Cross	8:08
2.	"Starless"	Wetton; Palmer-James	Wetton; Bruford; Fripp; Cross	12:18
Total length:				20:26 39:57

== Personnel ==
King Crimson

- Robert Fripp – guitar, Mellotron, Hohner Pianet (3, 4, 5), production
- John Wetton – bass guitar, vocals (2, 3, 5), production
- Bill Bruford – drums, percussion, production

Additional personnel

- David Cross – violin (4)
- Mel Collins – soprano saxophone (5)
- Ian McDonald – alto saxophone (3, 5)
- Robin Miller – oboe (2)
- Mark Charig – cornet (2)
- Uncredited/unknown musician(s) – cello (1, 2, 5), double bass (5)
- George Chkiantz – recording engineer
- Rod Thear – assistant engineer
- Chris, Tex, Harvey and Peter Walmsley – equipment
- John Kosh – cover artwork
- Gered Mankowitz – photography

== Charts ==
1974 chart performance for Red
Chart (1974)	Peak position
Australian Albums (Kent Music Report)	94
UK Albums (Official Charts)	45
US Billboard 200	66

2024 chart performance for Red
Chart (2024)	Peak position
German Albums (Offizielle Top 100)	80
Japanese Albums (Oricon)	43
Japanese Hot Albums (Billboard Japan)	54
