= Thela Hun Ginjeet =

Single by King Crimson

from the album Discipline
- B-side: "Elephant Talk"
- Released: 1981 (Spain)
- Recorded: 1981
- Genre: New wave; art rock; funk rock
- Length: 6:26
- Label: Warner Records
- Songwriters: Adrian Belew, Bill Bruford, Robert Fripp and Tony Levin
- Producers: King Crimson, Rhett Davies

King Crimson singles chronology
"Matte Kudasai" (1981)	"Thela Hun Ginjeet" (1981)	"Heartbeat" (1982)

"Thela Hun Ginjeet" is a single by the band King Crimson, released in 1981 and on the album Discipline (1981). The song name is an anagram of "heat in the jungle", itself a euphemism for city-based crime. (The term "heat" is American slang for firearms or for police.)

While "Thela Hun Ginjeet" is in 4/4 time, Robert Fripp's electric guitar plays in 7/8 time during much of the song, creating a polymetric effect. The middle section of the song features a recording of Adrian Belew's voice, which was covertly recorded at Fripp's direction. An agitated Belew related a story about how he was wandering around the Notting Hill Gate neighborhood of London where Discipline was recorded at Island Studios, while carrying a portable tape recorder and hoping to find inspiration for lyrics. Instead, he was confronted by a street gang who found his actions suspicious, and subsequently questioned by the police who thought he was possibly a drug dealer.

== Live versions ==
During King Crimson's tours in support of Discipline and its successor Beat, Belew would tell the story while the song was being performed. During the Beat tour, the story-telling portion was somewhat improvised. From the Three of a Perfect Pair tour onwards this spoken part was dropped, leaving only the sung lyrics, although the original recording was played during tours in the band's mid-1990s "double trio" era. This practice of using the original recording of Belew continued during the 2024 and 2025 tour of the group Beat, which featured Belew and Levin performing the music of early 1980's King Crimson.

== Cover versions ==
- Groups with Discipline-era King Crimson members (e.g. Adrian Belew Power Trio, Stick Men, The Crimson ProjeKCt) have covered the song live.
- Les Claypool has covered this song live, along with Primus, his musical project Colonel Les Claypool's Fearless Flying Frog Brigade (as included on their live album Live Frogs Set 1), and The Claypool Lennon Delirium.
- Supergroup Gizmodrome, of which Belew is a member, performed the song in concert during their 2018 tours and included a live version on the album Gizmodrome Live.

== Track listing ==
=== 7" version ===
1. "Thela Hun Ginjeet" (Adrian Belew, Bill Bruford, Robert Fripp, Tony Levin)
2. "Elephant Talk" (Belew, Bruford, Fripp, Levin)

=== 12" version ===
1. "Thela Hun Ginjeet" (dance mix) (Belew, Bruford, Fripp, Levin)
2. "Elephant Talk" (Belew, Bruford, Fripp, Levin)
3. "Indiscipline" (Belew, Bruford, Fripp, Levin)

== Personnel ==
- Adrian Belew – electric guitar, lead vocals, spoken word
- Robert Fripp – electric guitar
- Tony Levin – bass guitar, backing vocals
- Bill Bruford – drums, percussion
