= Fallen Angel (King Crimson song) =

Song by King Crimson

from the album Red
- Released: 6 October 1974
- Recorded: August 1974
- Studio: Olympic, London
- Genre: Progressive rock; progressive metal
- Length: 6:03
- Label: Island (UK & Europe), Atlantic (USA)
- Composers: Robert Fripp; John Wetton; Bill Bruford
- Lyricists: Richard Palmer-James; John Wetton
- Producer: King Crimson

"Fallen Angel" is a composition by English progressive rock band King Crimson. It is the second track on their seventh studio album, Red, released on 6 October 1974.

The lyrics are a man's lament over the tragedy of his young brother, who joined a gang and was stabbed to death on the streets of New York City, sung by John Wetton.

The motif used in "Fallen Angel" is an arpeggio by Robert Fripp, which originated during an improvisation for the recording of Larks' Tongues in Aspic in 1972. Guest musicians Mark Charig (cornet) and Robin Miller (oboe) appear during select musical passages. Charig and Miller had previously played on the albums Lizard (1970) and Islands (1971).

It was the last of King Crimson's studio albums to include acoustic guitar played by Fripp. This is also the last time the acoustic guitar appears on a studio-recorded song by the band, with the exception of an acoustic version of "Eyes Wide Open" (performed by Adrian Belew) on the 2002 EP Happy with What You Have to Be Happy With.

The band did not perform the song live until a concert in Chicago in 2017.

== Personnel ==
- Robert Fripp – electric guitar, acoustic guitar, Mellotron
- John Wetton – bass guitar, vocals
- Bill Bruford – drums, percussion

with:

- Mark Charig – cornet
- Robin Miller – oboe
- uncredited – cello
