= Matte Kudasai =

Single by King Crimson

from the album Discipline
- B-side: "Elephant Talk"
- Released: November 1981
- Recorded: 1981
- Genre: Progressive pop
- Length: 3:47
- Label: Warner Records
- Songwriters: Adrian Belew, Bill Bruford, Robert Fripp, Tony Levin
- Producers: King Crimson, Rhett Davies

King Crimson singles chronology
| "Epitaph/21st Century Schizoid Man" (1976) | "Matte Kudasai" (1981) | "Thela Hun Ginjeet" (1981) |

"Matte Kudasai" (Japanese: 待ってください) literally "Wait, Please" in Japanese, is a ballad by the progressive rock band King Crimson. Featuring vocals by Adrian Belew, it was released as the first single from the album Discipline (1981). In the UK, the single just missed the chart.

"Matte Kudasai" evolved out of a guitar riff played by Robert Fripp during 1980 tour rehearsals for Fripp's short-lived new wave band The League of Gentlemen. That riff, in turn, had similarities to Fripp's song "North Star", which had appeared on his 1979 album Exposure (with vocals, and lyrics, by Daryl Hall). The League of Gentlemen practiced playing along with Fripp; the rehearsal recording was later posted online by Discipline Global Mobile archivist Alex R. "Stormy" Mundy, who dubbed the resulting song "Northa Kudasai" to reflect its intermediate state.

While Belew was crafting material for Discipline, Fripp presented him with the chord progression to "Matte Kudasai" on guitar. Belew described this as "a breakthrough" moment, as he had previously struggled to craft suitable material for the band. He subsequently created a slide guitar part and some lyrics to accompany the composition.

For the 1989 Definitive Edition remaster of Discipline, the song was remixed to remove the Frippertronics parts that dotted the original 1981 version. The 30th and 35th anniversary editions, meanwhile, contain both mixes of the song: the 1989 version is kept as track three, while the 1981 version (billed as an "Alternative Version") is featured at the end of the album as a bonus track.

== Personnel ==
- Adrian Belew – guitar, vocals
- Robert Fripp – Roland G-303 guitar synthesizer controller, Roland GR-300 guitar synthesizer
- Tony Levin – Music Man Stingray 4 bass
- Bill Bruford – drums

== Covers ==
The short-lived jazz group Crimson Jazz Trio, founded by former King Crimson drummer Ian Wallace to play instrumental jazz versions of King Crimson songs, included "Matte Kudasai" on their first album, The King Crimson Songbook, Volume One (2005). Kurt Elling covered the song as the opening track of his 2011 album The Gate.

On 20 April 2011, k.d. lang and her band the Siss Boom Bang covered the song as part of her concert at the BBC Radio Theater. The audio and video of that performance were broadcast on 21 April 2011 on BBC Radio 2. Lang noted in her introduction to the song that it was influential on the sound of her fifth album, Ingenue.

The Levin Brothers (keyboardist/arranger Pete Levin and King Crimson bassist Tony Levin) included an instrumental version of "Matte Kudasai" on their 2014 album Levin Brothers.
