= David Cross (musician) =

English musician (born 1949)

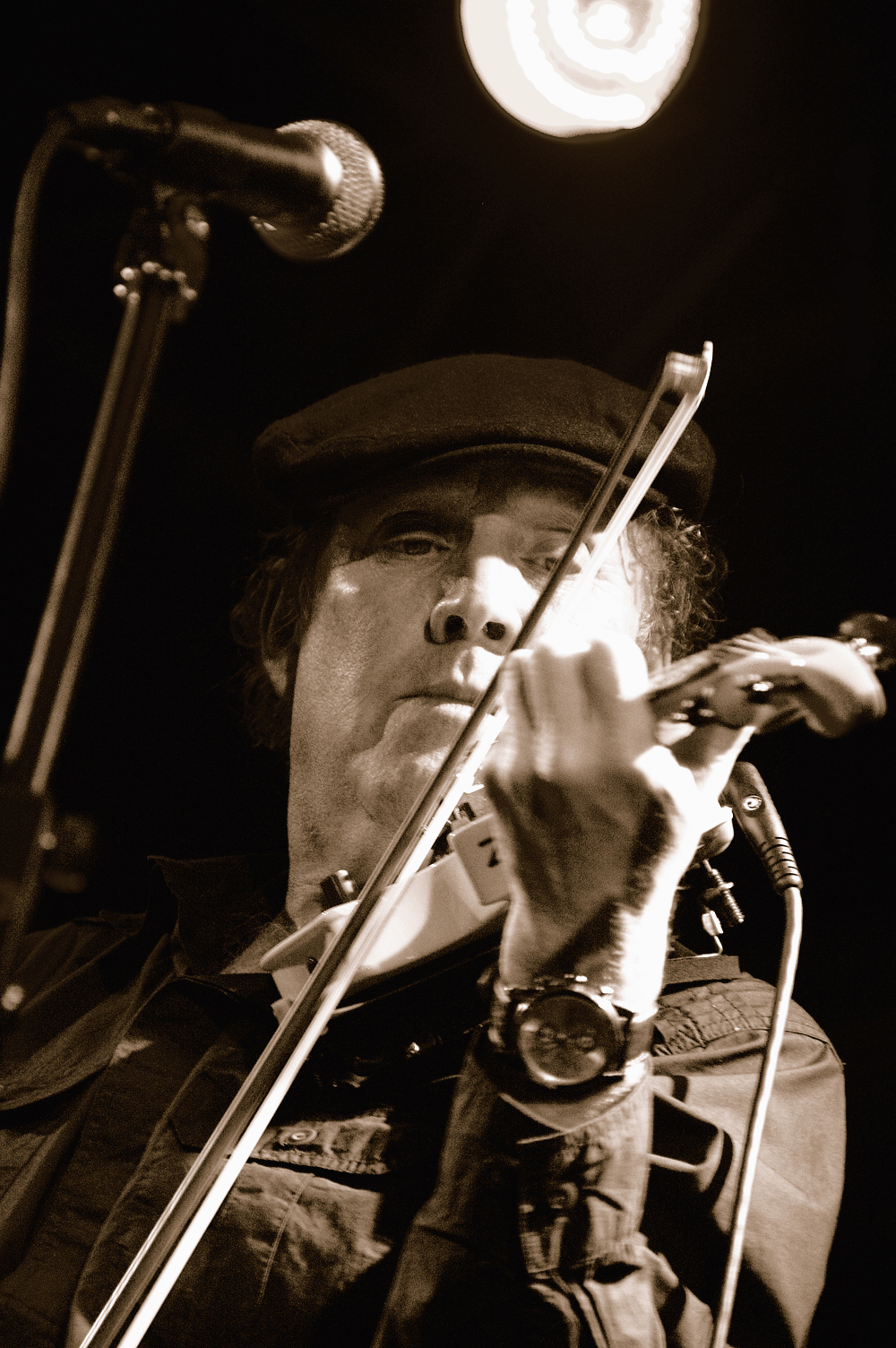
- Cross in 2010

Background information
- Born: 23 April 1949 (age 77); Plymouth, England
- Instruments: Violin; viola; keyboards; flute
- Years active: 1972–present
- Labels: Noisy; Discipline Global Mobile
- Member of: David Cross Band
- Formerly of: King Crimson; Radius; Electric Chamber Music
- Website: davidcrossband.com

David Francis Cross (born 23 April 1949 in Turnchapel near Plymouth, England) is an English electric violinist and keyboardist best known for playing with progressive rock band King Crimson from 1972 to 1974.

== Biography ==
Cross appeared on the King Crimson studio albums Larks' Tongues in Aspic (1973) and Starless and Bible Black (1974), as well as "Providence", a live track on Red (1974), in addition to live albums USA (1975) and The Night Watch (recorded 1973, released 1997). Cross also appears on numerous concert recordings from his time in the group that have been released by Robert Fripp's Discipline Global Mobile label in the decades since. Cross was voted out of the group after a 1974 tour. He had withdrawn personally from the other musicians over time, and had expressed frustration as his violin was increasingly overwhelmed by the other instruments during live performances.

After his time with King Crimson, Cross travelled extensively, eventually returning to music through his work in theatre. In 1987 he formed an ensemble called Low Flying Aircraft with Keith Tippett on piano. In 1988, he was invited by keyboardist Geoff Serle to join Radius, with whom he has recorded five studio albums.

Since the late 1980s, Cross has toured and recorded with his own eponymous band (see below). Over a 30-year period, the group has at different times included saxophonist Pete McPhail, guitarists Paul Clark and Peter Claridge, bassists Simon Murrell, John Dillon (who also sang) and Mick Paul, drummers Dan Maurer, Lloyd, Craig Blundell, Pat Garvey, Steve Roberts and Jack Summerfield, keyboardists Sheila Maloney and Alex Hall, and lead singers Arch Stanton (Jonathan Casey) and Jinian Wilde. Former King Crimson musicians Robert Fripp, Pat Mastelotto and John Wetton, as well as former Crimson lyricists Peter Sinfield and Richard Palmer-James, have all contributed to the group's albums, or Cross solo projects.

Prominent session work includes recordings with Clearlight, Jade Warrior and Tony Levin's Stick Men (with whom Cross toured).

Recently, Cross has released a series of duo recordings with Robert Fripp, Andrew Keeling, Andrew Booker (of No-Man), David Jackson (formerly of Van der Graaf Generator) and the late Peter Banks (formerly of Yes), the latter two including a full band.

Cross has composed music for theatre and also worked as an actor. He runs his own record label, Noisy Records.

Cross has cited John Coltrane, Miles Davis, Jimi Hendrix, Eric Clapton, David Oistrach and Itzhak Perlman as musical influences.

== David Cross Band ==
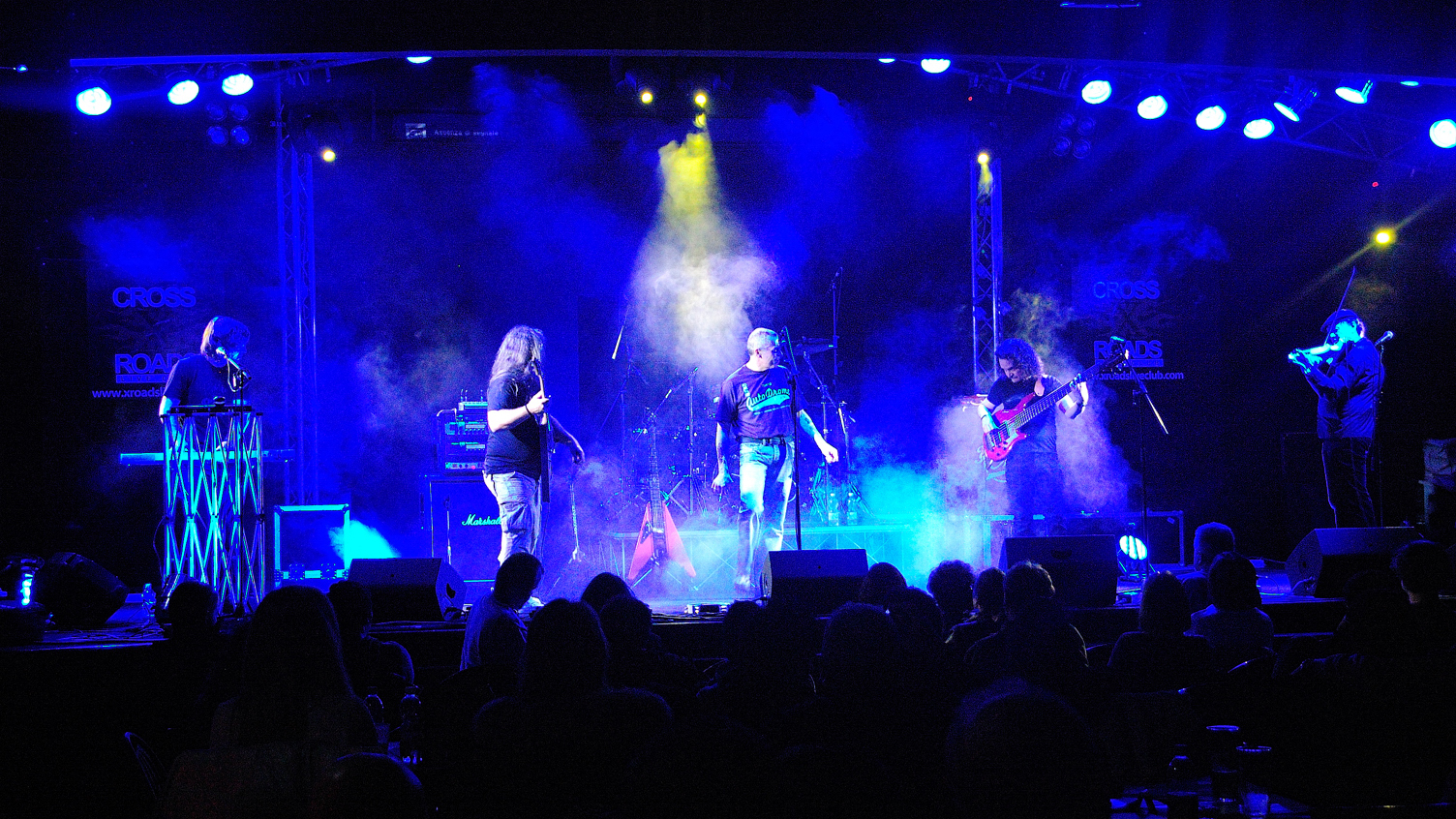
The David Cross Band performing in 2010

The David Cross Band was established in 1988/89. The first edition of the group consisted of keyboardist Sheila Maloney, bassist Simon Murrell (soon replaced by John Dillon), saxophonist Pete McPhail and drummer Dan Maurer. The longest serving members of the group are guitarist Paul Clark (since 1994) and bassist Mick Paul (since 1995). The David Cross Band have released seven albums that blend elements of progressive rock, heavy metal, classical, ambient, jazz and experimental music.

== Academic work ==
Cross has been a senior lecturer in Music Education at London Metropolitan University.

== Discography ==
=== With King Crimson ===
- Larks' Tongues in Aspic (1973)
- Starless and Bible Black (1974)
- Red (1974) (“Providence” as a performer/ co-composer and “Starless” as co-composer)

Live albums

- USA (1975) (recorded in June, 1974)
- The Great Deceiver (1992) (boxed set, 1973–1974)
- The Night Watch (1997) (recorded in November, 1973)

=== With Robert Fripp ===
- Starless Starlight (2015)

=== Solo / David Cross Band ===
- Memos from Purgatory (1989)
- The Big Picture (1992) (David Cross Band)
- Testing to Destruction (1994) (David Cross Band)
- Exiles (1997) (David Cross Band + guests)
- Closer Than Skin (2005) (David Cross Band)
- Alive in the Underworld (2008) (David Cross Band)
- Sign of the Crow (2016) (David Cross Band)
- Crossing the Tracks (2018)
- Ice Blue, Silver Sky (2023) (David Cross Band)

=== With Naomi Maki ===
- Unbounded (2006)

=== With Radius ===
- Arc Measuring (1988)
- Sightseeing (1989)
- Elevation (1992)
- There Is No Peace (1995)
- Civilisations (2000)

=== With Andrew Keeling ===
- English Sun (2009)
- October Is Marigold (2021)

=== Collaborations ===
- The Butterfly Ball (With Rod Edwards and Roger Hand) (1975)
- Clearlight: Forever Blowing Bubbles (1975)
- Paul Egan: Island of Dreams (1978)
- Shock Headed Peters: Life Extinguisher EP (1986)
- Low Flying Aircraft: Low Flying Aircraft (1987)
- Danielle Dax: Blast The Human Flower (1990)
- Jade Warrior: Distant Echoes (1993)
- Rime of the Ancient Sampler: A Mellotron Compilation (1993)
- Joe Hisaishi: Chijou no Rakuen (1994)
- Stick Men + featuring David Cross: Midori (2016)
- David Cross and Sean Quinn: Cold Sky Blue (2016)
- David Cross and David Jackson: Another Day (2018)
- David Cross and Andrew Booker: Ends Meeting (2018)
- David Cross and Peter Banks: Crossover (2020)
- David Cross and Peter Banks: The Other Horizon (2026)

== Theatre ==
- 1995: That World by Dean Allen - role of 'Shades' (Hades)
