= Epitaph (song) =

1969 song by King Crimson

Song by King Crimson

from the album In the Court of the Crimson King
- Released: 10 October 1969
- Recorded: 30 July 1969
- Genre: Symphonic rock; folk rock; progressive rock
- Length: 8:47
- Label: Atlantic
- Composers: Robert Fripp; Ian McDonald; Greg Lake; Michael Giles
- Lyricist: Peter Sinfield
- Producer: King Crimson

"Epitaph"
- UK picture sleeve

Single by King Crimson

from the album A Young Person's Guide to King Crimson
- B-side: "21st Century Schizoid Man"
- Released: February 1976
- Length: 8:47
- Label: Atlantic

King Crimson singles chronology
"The Night Watch" (1974)	"Epitaph" (1976)	"Matte Kudasai" (1981)

"Epitaph" is the third track on British progressive rock band King Crimson's 1969 album In the Court of the Crimson King. It was written by Robert Fripp, Ian McDonald, Greg Lake, and Michael Giles with lyrics written by Peter Sinfield.

The song is noted for its heavy use of the Mellotron. As with the album's first track, "21st Century Schizoid Man", the song's lyrics have a distinctly dystopian feel to them and are presented as a protest to the Cold War.

The song's title was used as the name for a live album of recordings done by the original King Crimson, Epitaph. Epitaph Records also took its name from the song.

Emerson, Lake & Palmer would later incorporate an excerpt from this song after the "Battlefield" portion of the live version of their song "Tarkus", from the Tarkus album, as documented in the live album Welcome Back My Friends to the Show That Never Ends... Ladies and Gentlemen.

== Track listing ==
In 1976, "Epitaph" was released as a single with "21st Century Schizoid Man" as the B-side, a companion to the compilation A Young Person's Guide to King Crimson (1976).

1. "Epitaph" (including "March for No Reason" and "Tomorrow and Tomorrow") (Robert Fripp, Michael Giles, Greg Lake, Ian McDonald, Peter Sinfield)
2. "21st Century Schizoid Man" (including "Mirrors") (Fripp, Giles, Lake, McDonald, Sinfield)

== Personnel ==
- Robert Fripp – acoustic guitar, electric guitar
- Ian McDonald – Mellotron, harpsichord, piano, flute, organ, clarinet, bass clarinet
- Greg Lake – bass guitar, vocals
- Michael Giles – drums, percussion, timpani
- Peter Sinfield – lyrics
