= Discipline (King Crimson album) =

Studio album by King Crimson
- Released: 2 October 1981
- Recorded: May and June 1981
- Studios: Island (Notting Hill, London)
- Genres: Art rock; progressive rock; new wave; post-progressive; dance-rock
- Length: 38:15
- Labels: E.G.; Warner Bros.
- Producers: King Crimson; Rhett Davies

King Crimson chronology
A Young Person's Guide to King Crimson (1976)	Discipline (1981)	Beat (1982)

King Crimson studio chronology
Red (1974)	Discipline (1981)	Beat (1982)

Singles from Discipline
- 1. "Matte Kudasai" Released: November 1981; 2. "Thela Hun Ginjeet" Released: 1981 (Spain)

Discipline is the eighth studio album by the English progressive rock band King Crimson. It was released on 2 October 1981 by E.G. Records in the United Kingdom, where it peaked at No. 41. Warner Bros. Records released the album in the United States, reaching a peak position of No. 45.

This album was King Crimson's first following a seven-year hiatus; only co-founder and guitarist Robert Fripp and drummer Bill Bruford remained from previous incarnations of the band. They were joined by two American musicians: vocalist, guitarist and frontman Adrian Belew, previously a member of Frank Zappa and David Bowie's backing bands and a touring member of Talking Heads, and bassist, Chapman Stick player, and backing vocalist Tony Levin, a session musician Fripp had met while both were working with Peter Gabriel.

Discipline introduced a new sound for the band, influenced by new wave, post-punk, minimalism and Indonesian gamelan music, while retaining an experimental character, helping lay the groundwork for what would eventually become known as post-progressive rock. Music publications have described Discipline as having elements of art rock, progressive rock, and dance-rock.

== Background ==
Shortly before the release of Red in 1974, King Crimson bandleader Robert Fripp decided to disband the group, stating in an interview with Trouser Press magazine that "King Crimson is completely over. For ever and ever." In the interim, following a brief period of retirement from the music industry, Fripp collaborated with musicians including Brian Eno, Peter Gabriel and David Bowie and released a series of albums. A King Crimson reunion was considered in 1977 but ultimately rejected by Fripp, so the two other members from the Red lineup, Bill Bruford and John Wetton, formed the band U.K. In 1979, Fripp released the solo album Exposure, kickstarting a period that he dubbed the "Drive to 1981"; this concluded once his band The League of Gentlemen dissolved in late 1980.

Fripp had sought to assemble a new band that would grant him "access to the latest, current ideas, [and] the best musicians" while still touring with The League of Gentlemen. He then recruited Bruford, Tony Levin, and Adrian Belew to form the band Discipline, which performed live with the Lounge Lizards in the United Kingdom throughout parts of 1981. Fripp later opted to rename Discipline to King Crimson after concluding that "there was no doubt that the band playing was King Crimson."

== Composition and recording ==
"Frame By Frame" features phasing between two guitar parts playing versions of the same melody, in a manner which writer Sid Smith compared to the work of American minimalist composer Steve Reich.

The title of the ballad "Matte Kudasai" means "please wait" in Japanese (待って下さい). The original release of Discipline featured a guitar part on this track by Fripp that was removed from the 1989 "Definitive Edition" remaster and most subsequent editions. The 30th and 35th anniversary editions of the album include both versions of the song.

The lyrics of "Indiscipline" were adapted from a letter written to Adrian Belew by his then-wife Margaret concerning a painting that she had made, with all direct references to its subject removed.

The title of "Thela Hun Ginjeet" is an anagram of "heat in the jungle", a euphemism for urban crime. When it was first performed live, some of its lyrics were improvised around an illicit recording made by Robert Fripp of his neighbours having a vicious argument when he was living in Manhattan; this recording is featured on the track "NY3" on Fripp's solo album Exposure. While "Thela Hun Ginjeet" was being recorded, Adrian Belew, walking around Notting Hill Gate with a tape recorder looking for lyrical inspiration, was harassed first by a gang that took and played the tape and then by police who searched the tape recorder for drugs. On returning to the studio, he gave his bandmates a distraught account of what had just happened to him. Fripp covertly signaled to the recording engineer to record Belew, and this recording is featured on the Discipline version of the track.

"The Sheltering Sky", which heavily features Belew and Fripp on the Roland GR-300 guitar synthesizer, is named after and partially inspired by the 1949 novel of the same name by Paul Bowles. Bowles is often associated with the Beat Generation, the writings of which would inform King Crimson's subsequent studio album Beat.

Later versions of Discipline featured this design by Steve Ball.

Some live versions of "Elephant Talk", "Indiscipline", and "Thela Hun Ginjeet" included vocal improvisation during the spoken-word sections.

The back cover features the statement, "Discipline is never an end in itself, only a means to an end". The original front cover features a variation on a copyrighted Celtic knot design by George Bain. As it was found to be used without proper licensing, it was replaced on later releases by a knotwork designed by Steve Ball on commission from Fripp. Ball's design is also used as the logo of Fripp's record label, Discipline Global Mobile.

== Reception ==
Professional ratings
Review scores
Source	Rating
All About Jazz	5/5 stars
AllMusic	4.5/5 stars
The Encyclopedia of Popular Music	3/5 stars
Mojo	4/5 stars
MusicHound Rock	4.5/5 stars
Pitchfork	8.8/10
Record Mirror	4/5 stars
Rolling Stone	3/5 stars
The Rolling Stone Album Guide	4.5/5 stars
The Village Voice	B

Discipline reached number 41 on the UK Albums Chart and received mixed to positive reviews. John Piccarella's review in Rolling Stone praised King Crimson's talent and artistry, particularly Belew and Fripp's "visionary approach to guitar playing", but criticised the "arty content" of the album itself, hoping that "this band of virtuosos [would stay] together long enough to transform all of their experiments into innovations." Record Mirror's Alan Entwistle was generally enthusiastic, writing that the band "tests new ground and revitalises older ground"; he highlighted the "more mature" second side of the album, noting its "distinct songs that are danceable as well as disciplined".

Record World said that Discipline demonstrated that King Crimson "continues to pursue the highest standards in innovation". Cashbox commented that the project was "original and interesting". Billboard wrote that "those who expected a rerun of Court Of The Crimson King may be disappointed, even though the LP is still in the 'progressive rock vein". They believed that the album was more similar to the work of Talking Heads than Yes.

Robert Christgau of The Village Voice described the album as "musically, not bad—the [Talking] Heads meet the League of Gentlemen". In The Village Voice's year-end Pazz & Jop poll, Discipline was voted by critics as the 35th best album of the year.

Greg Prato's retrospective review in AllMusic commended the album's "inspired performances", particularly applauding the unexpectedly successful combination of Belew and Fripp's disparate playing styles: "the pairing of these two originals worked out magically." Trouser Press characterised the album's songs as "unfolding musical sculptures, played with precision and rare imagination" and "a mostly successful synthesis of ambition, simplicity and Kraftwerkian clarity."

== Legacy ==
In 2002, Pitchfork ranked Discipline at number 56 on its list of "The Top 100 Albums of the 1980s"; in the album's entry on the list, staff writer Dominique Leone cited it as an influence on math rock and called it "as angular and tense as any post-punk group while as precise and rhythmically propulsive as a Bartók string quartet."

In 2024, Adrian Belew and Tony Levin formed BEAT with Steve Vai and Tool drummer Danny Carey, performing music by the 1980s incarnation of King Crimson. This included material from Discipline as well as the subsequent albums Beat and Three of a Perfect Pair.

== Track listing ==
All music written by Adrian Belew, Robert Fripp, Tony Levin and Bill Bruford; all lyrics written by Adrian Belew.

Side one
No.	Title	Length
1.	"Elephant Talk"	4:43
2.	"Frame by Frame"	5:09
3.	"Matte Kudasai"	3:47
4.	"Indiscipline"	4:33
Total length:		18:12

Side two
No.	Title	Length
1.	"Thela Hun Ginjeet"	6:26
2.	"The Sheltering Sky" (instrumental)	8:22
3.	"Discipline" (instrumental)	5:13
Total length:		20:01

== Personnel ==
King Crimson

- Adrian Belew – electric guitar, Roland GR-300 guitar synthesizer, lead vocals
- Robert Fripp – electric guitar, Roland GR-300 guitar synthesizer, organ, devices
- Tony Levin – Chapman Stick, bass guitar, backing vocals
- Bill Bruford – drums, Simmons electronic drums, slit drum, percussion

Additional personnel

- Rhett Davies – production
- Nigel Mills – assistant engineer
- Graham Davies – gear
- Peter Saville – graphic design
- John Kyrk – knotwork (uncredited; original release and all pre-2001 reissues)
- Steve Ball – knotwork (all reissues since 2001)
- Paddy Spinks – strategic management

== Charts ==
Chart (1981–82)	Peak position
Canada Top Albums/CDs (RPM)	18
Dutch Albums (Album Top 100)	43
French Albums (SNEP)	17
Japanese Albums (Oricon)	33
New Zealand Albums (RMNZ)	13
Swedish Albums (Sverigetopplistan)	37
UK Albums (Official Charts)	41
US Billboard 200	45
