= In the Court of the Crimson King =

Studio album by King Crimson
- Released: 10 October 1969
- Recorded: 7 July – 13 August 1969
- Studios: Wessex, London
- Genres: Progressive rock; art rock
- Length: 43:54
- Labels: Island; Atlantic; E.G.
- Producer: King Crimson

King Crimson chronology
In the Court of the Crimson King (1969)	In the Wake of Poseidon (1970)

Singles from In the Court of the Crimson King
- 1. "The Court of the Crimson King" Released: October 1969

In the Court of the Crimson King (subtitled An Observation by King Crimson) is the debut studio album by English progressive rock band King Crimson, released on 10 October 1969, by Island Records. Often regarded as the first true progressive rock album, it combined rock music influences with elements of jazz, classical, and symphonic music while describing the devastating effects of war and conflict, societal alienation and disillusionment, the perceived futility of human efforts against powerful, corrupt forces, unchecked authority and corrupt leadership.

In the Court of the Crimson King was King Crimson's most commercially successful album, and is widely lauded as one of the greatest progressive rock albums ever released. It reached number five on the UK Albums Chart and number 28 on the US Billboard 200, where it was certified Gold by the Recording Industry Association of America (RIAA). In 2015, the album was ranked number 2 on Rolling Stone's list of the "50 Greatest Prog Rock Albums of All Time", behind 1973's The Dark Side of the Moon by Pink Floyd.

== Background and recording ==
King Crimson made their live debut on 9 April 1969 at the Speakeasy Club in London. Another concert at the Speakeasy Club circa August 1969, was disrupted by members of the Pink Fairies Drinking Club (including Steve Peregrin Took, hours before his flight out to the US for Tyrannosaurus Rex's August/September 1969 debut American tour) who were out celebrating the completion of Twink's solo album Think Pink. King Crimson opened for the Rolling Stones in Hyde Park, London, in July 1969, before an estimated 250,000 to 500,000 people, which brought them positive attention.

Initial sessions for the album were held in early 1969 with producer Tony Clarke, most famous for his work with the Moody Blues. After these sessions failed to work out, the group were given permission to produce the album themselves. The album was recorded on a 1" 8-channel recorder at Wessex Sound Studios in London, engineered by Robin Thompson and assisted by Tony Page. In order to achieve the characteristic lush, orchestral sounds on the album, Ian McDonald spent many hours overdubbing layers of Mellotron and various woodwind and reed instruments. In some cases, the band went through five tape generations to attain deeply layered, segued tracks. On "Epitaph", McDonald recorded two separate Mellotron parts and continually shifted their volumes against each other while mixing, saying the technique gave a "sense of motion" to the sustained chords, which would otherwise "sound rather flat sonically".

== Composition ==
The music on In the Court of the Crimson King is considered by critics to be stylistically diverse and rhythmically complex. John Cunningham of WhatCulture said the album "threw the bluesy sound of rock at the time out the window. In its place, the group displayed a psychedelic hybrid style composed of acid rock, jazz and classical overtones." Sean Murphy of PopMatters assessed: "This was not a pose, and it was not reactionary; it still manages to seem somehow ahead of its time as well as—it must be said—out of time. Of course, it came out of an era and the minds from which it was conceived, a dark, sensitive, and undeniably psychedelic space." He said that musically, the album "speaks from the underground, but is grounded in history and looks forward, not backward". According to music historian Jeff Gold, "King Crimson abandoned most of rock's R&B roots to embrace a kind of guitar and Mellotron-based, crypto-classical style that went well beyond what Procol Harum and the Moody Blues had previously attempted." The album contains what music critic Jim DeRogatis describes as "symphonic arrangements," with flute and saxophone sections performed by Ian McDonald. His Mellotron is said to be the "dominant" instrument on the album, and is described as "fierce and overpowering". Robert Fripp's guitar work has been characterized as "strangely [fusing] elegant classical, Hendrix-like rock explosions, and jazz noodling." Lake's voice has been described as "plaintive." The album's lyrics have been described as "portentous," and explore socially conscious themes like war, societal collapse and alienation. They have been characterized as being "filled with dark and doom-laden visions". Gold also noted that the lyrics consist of "oblique wordplay".

"21st Century Schizoid Man" has been called "perhaps the first alternative anthem" by Manish Agarwal of Time Out, and DeRogatis said Fripp "never rocked harder" than he did on the track, likening the stylings to heavy metal. The song "I Talk to the Wind" was written for King Crimson predecessor group Giles, Giles and Fripp (the only song on the album for which this was the case), but was retained by King Crimson in order to show the group's soft side. According to lyricist Peter Sinfield, the song was influenced by Joni Mitchell; in a 1997 interview, he said it is still his favourite lyric that he ever wrote. Agarwal described "Epitaph" as a ballad. He described "Moonchild" as a "spooky pastoral love song". The song contains what is described as an "improvised ambient-jazz interlude." The album's title track is said to invoke a "medieval" atmosphere, and contains what has been characterized as "folky arabesques, bombastic drum rolls, and baroque flute." The track was written by keyboardist/woodwinds player Ian McDonald and Sinfield for their earlier group The Creation, and started as a country and western song before its final progressive rock configuration.

== Artwork ==
Barry Godber (1945–1970), a computer programmer friend of Sinfield's, painted the artwork for the album using watercolors. He used his own face, viewed through a mirror, as the model. Godber died in February 1970 from a heart attack, shortly after the album's release. He was 24 years old. It was his only painting; the original painting is now owned by Robert Fripp. Fripp had said about Godber's artwork: "Peter [Sinfield] brought this painting in and the band loved it. I recently recovered the original from [managing label E.G. Records's] offices because they kept it exposed to bright light, at the risk of ruining it, so I ended up removing it. The face on the outside is the Schizoid Man, and on the inside it's the Crimson King. If you cover the smiling face, the eyes reveal an incredible sadness. What can one add? It reflects the music."

Manish Agarwal of Time Out called the cover artwork "scary", and suggested it to be "best enjoyed on gatefold vinyl."

== Release ==
In the Court of the Crimson King was released on 10 October 1969. The album reached No. 5 on the UK Albums Chart and No. 28 on the US Billboard 200, where it was certified Gold by the Recording Industry Association of America (RIAA) for equivalent sales of 500,000 units in the United States. The album also charted within the top 10 of the Australian Album Chart, and charted within Canada and Japan.

=== Reissues ===
In the Court of the Crimson King was reissued several times in the 1980s and 1990s through Polydor and E.G. Records, with pressings made from copies that were several generations removed from the stereo sub-master tape. This resulted in sub-par audio quality and audible tape hiss. While supervising a mastering cut, Ian McDonald discovered that the copy master had a problem on the right track, and because the first generation master tapes were missing since 1969, this problem was compensated for by EQ until 2002. Fripp speculated that the problem was caused by incompetent mastering engineers or "some tapes were mastered in different countries on machines that were not very well maintained or from copies made in the source country (normally US or UK in the case of rock music) where the second machine was inadequately maintained/monitored. These tapes were then sent out to licensee countries who had no adequate measure of comparison and trusted the source material from the record company office. Tape machines running at different speeds occasionally resulted in albums being a couple of seconds shorter/longer".

In 1982, Mobile Fidelity Sound Lab released a half speed mastered version of the album on vinyl, cut by Stan Ricker with the Ortofon Cutting System. In 1989 the album was remastered for its debut on CD by Robert Fripp and Tony Arnold; this version was part of "The Definitive Edition" series, which consisted of other remastered albums by the band. In 1999, in commemoration of its 30th anniversary, the album was remastered again, this time using 24 bit and HDCD technology by Simon Heyworth, Robert Fripp and David Singleton; this edition was part of the "30th Anniversary Edition" series, which consisted of remastered editions of King Crimson's back-catalogue for their 30th anniversaries.

Three years later, in 2002, the original masters were discovered in the Virgin archives, with splicing tape still present between the various songs, and crossfade between "I Talk to the Wind" and "Epitaph" yet to be created. In 2004, a new remaster was done by Simon Heyworth using these first-generation stereo master tapes and it was released the same year with a 12-page booklet. This release was called "Original Master Edition" and used the same HDCD and 24 bit technology as the 1999 remaster.

In October 2009, Fripp collaborated with musician and producer Steven Wilson to remix the original master recordings in a new stereo and 5.1 surround sound mix, released as the album's 40th Anniversary edition. The album was sold as three different packages: a two-CD set with the old and new stereo versions, a CD and DVD set with the new stereo and surround sound mixes, and a six-disc (5 CD/1 DVD) box with all mixes and bonus audio and video tracks. In 2010, the original 1969 stereo mix was remastered and reissued on 200-gram super-heavyweight vinyl. This edition was cut by John Dent at Loud Mastering, it was approved by Robert Fripp and included a download code for a 320 kbit/s transfer of the original 1969 vinyl.

In 2019, the album was remixed in 5.1 and stereo by Steven Wilson once again for a 50th anniversary box set of the album. Wilson expressed satisfaction with his 2009 remix, but stated that his 50th anniversary mixes are a significant improvement, being more faithful to the original 1969 mix and benefitting from his 10 years of ensuing experience. The box set includes 3 CDs and a Blu-ray. The Blu-ray features the all-new 2019 stereo and 5.1 mixes encoded at 24/96 resolution, the 2004 "Original Master Edition" with the 1969 mix (also encoded at 24/96), a complete alternate version of the album comprising 2019 Steven Wilson mixes and 2019 instrumental mixes, while the three CDs in the box set feature the new 2019 stereo mix, an expanded edition of the alternate album in the Blu-ray and the "Original Master Edition" plus additional tracks.

== Critical reception ==
Professional ratings
Review scores
Source	Rating
All About Jazz	5/5 stars
AllMusic	5/5 stars
Classic Rock	9/10 stars
Encyclopedia of Popular Music	5/5 stars
The Great Rock Discography	9/10
Mojo	5/5 stars
MusicHound	4/5 stars
Pitchfork	10/10
The Rolling Stone Album Guide	3.5/5 stars
The Village Voice	D+

In the Court of the Crimson King received acclaim in the British music press. In NME, Nick Logan said that although the album lacked the impact of their live concerts, the diverse musical influences from pop, jazz and classical music had produced a result that was "totally original and always captivating", and stating that "King Crimson, on this showing, have it in them to be huge." Melody Maker also noted that the album did not fully capture the power of the band's live performances, but that it "still packs tremendous impact", and that "this is one you should try to hear". Disc and Music Echo described the album as "a brilliant mixture of melody and freakout, fast and slow, atmospheric and electric, all heightened by the words of Peter Sinfield". The magazine stated that "this must be heard as a complete entity" and concluded that it would "establish King Crimson as a major talent".

In the US, John Morthland of Rolling Stone said King Crimson had "combined aspects of many musical forms to create a surreal work of force and originality". Cashbox called the album a "tour-de-force" with "no loose ends" and also praised the band's musicianship, compositional skills, and arrangements. Record World listed the album as one of its album picks of the week in its 29 November 1969 publication and said that the album material was "tonsil scorching". Billboard highlighted the band's "towering sound and foreboding poetry" and singled out the title track as a song that reflected the band's "depth and deliberateness". Village Voice critic Robert Christgau called the album "ersatz shit".

Later reviews of In the Court of the Crimson King have been positive, with many noting its influence. Reviewing the 1987 reissue, David Hepworth said, "What's most striking about the above 1969 recording is how reliable a blueprint it subsequently turned out to be. In just one album, Fripp and his cohorts ... demonstrated just how limited a thing pop music could be once released from the constraints of the three minute hit single." Hepworth said that many artists had copied the album, but "in the fullness of time nobody really did it very much better". In 1999, Colin Shearman stated that the album's "manic energy and compressed imagery captures the violent downside of the hippy years better than almost any other recording from the time". AllMusic praised it "[a]s if somehow prophetic, King Crimson projected a darker and edgier brand of post-psychedelic rock" in its original review by Lindsay Planer, and called it "definitive" and "daring" in its current review. In Classic Rock reviews of King Crimson's 2009 reissues, Alexander Milas described In the Court of the Crimson King as the album which "blew off the doors of musical convention and cemented these quintessentially British innovators' place in rock history for all time".

In his 1997 book Rocking the Classics, critic and musicologist Edward Macan notes that In the Court of the Crimson King "may be the most influential progressive rock album ever released". Macan went on to argue that In the Court of the Crimson King presented an example of every significant element of a mature progressive rock genre. Further, Macan mentions that the album coalesces prog rock tropes and conventions, some of which are only established in the future, into a single congestable medium. The impact of these developments, in his eyes, is the album representing but also influencing the overall musical impact of progressive rock as a whole for decades to come. Paul Stump's History of Progressive Rock, published the same year, stated that "If Progressive rock as a discrete genre can be said to have had a starting point, In the Court of the Crimson King is probably it. All the elements that characterize Progressive's maturity are in place: jazz and blues influences are subservient to intense compositional rigour characterized by Mellotron-induced Western classical symphonic arrangements ... Individual and collective passages of arresting virtuosity and a rhythmic discontinuity bordering on the perverse are also components of an essentially tonal, approachable whole inoffensive to any classical or pop listener." Stump further commented that while the album is defined by avant-garde sensibility and subtle arrangements, it still communicates through the accessible language of rockers.

== Legacy ==
In the book Turn On Your Mind, music critic Jim DeRogatis cited In the Court of the Crimson King as "the album that got the progressive ball rolling". The Who's Pete Townshend was quoted as calling the album "an uncanny masterpiece". In the Q & Mojo Classic Special Edition Pink Floyd & The Story of Prog Rock, the album came fourth in its list of "40 Cosmic Rock Albums". The album was named as one of Classic Rock magazine's "50 Albums That Built Prog Rock". In 2014, readers of Rhythm voted it the eighth greatest drumming album in the history of progressive rock. In 2015, Rolling Stone named In the Court of the Crimson King the second greatest progressive rock album of all time, behind Pink Floyd's The Dark Side of the Moon. The album is also featured in the book 1001 Albums You Must Hear Before You Die. It was voted number 193 in Colin Larkin's All Time Top 1000 Albums.

Sean Murphy of PopMatters referred to the album as "The Rosetta Stone, and still the purest and most perfect expression of the progressive rock aesthetic." He further explained, "to fully fathom what In the Court of the Crimson King signifies, it's useful to consider it as less an uncompromised statement of purpose, and perhaps the first influential album that forsook even the pretense of commercial appeal. To understand, much less appreciate, what these mostly unknown Brits were doing you have to accept their sensibility completely on their terms." In the book 101 Essential Rock Records, author and music historian Jeff Gold called the album the "first true masterwork" of the progressive rock genre.

Bruce Elder of AllMusic referred to In the Court as King Crimson's "definitive album", and "one of the most daring debut albums ever recorded by anybody". He explained, "At the time, it blew all of the progressive/psychedelic competition out of the running, although it was almost too good for the band's own good – it took King Crimson nearly four years to come up with a record as strong or concise." John Cunningham of WhatCulture assessed: "Spitting in the face of British rock conventions, In The Court of the Crimson King is a landmark in prog rock history. [...] Surreal, dark and unpredictable, the album was unlike anything that had come before it at the time. [...] Arguably the original prog rock album, it remains one of the best to this day."

Hip hop artist Kanye West used samples of "21st Century Schizoid Man" in his song "Power", from his 2010 album My Beautiful Dark Twisted Fantasy. In a 2022 lawsuit by Declan Colgan Music Ltd, the owners of the mechanical licence for the song, they claimed that West had sampled it without a licence. The case was settled in May 2024.

== Track listing ==
All lyrics are written by Peter Sinfield.

Side one
No.	Title	Music	Length
1.	"21st Century Schizoid Man" (including "Mirrors")	Robert Fripp, Ian McDonald, Greg Lake, Michael Giles	7:24
2.	"I Talk to the Wind"	McDonald	6:05
3.	"Epitaph" (including "March for No Reason" and "Tomorrow and Tomorrow")	Fripp, McDonald, Lake, Giles	8:47
Total length:			22:16

Side two
No.	Title	Music	Length
1.	"Moonchild" (including "The Dream" and "The Illusion")	Fripp, McDonald, Lake, Giles	12:13
2.	"The Court of the Crimson King" (including "The Return of the Fire Witch" and "The Dance of the Puppets")	McDonald	9:25
Total length:			21:38 43:54

- After the end of "The Court of the Crimson King", there is a hidden track run from 9:41 to 10:00 on streaming services.
- The timings on the inner sleeve of original pressings, giving a total album time of 42:00, are incorrect.

== Personnel ==
King Crimson

- Robert Fripp – electric guitar; acoustic guitar (3, 5); production
- Ian McDonald – vocals; alto saxophone (1), flute (2, 3, 5), clarinet, piano (2, 3), bass clarinet (3), vibraphone (4), Mellotron Mk II (3-5), reed organ (all ext. 4), harpsichord (5); production
- Greg Lake – lead vocals, bass guitar; production
- Michael Giles – vocals, drum set; timpani (3); production
- Peter Sinfield – lyrics, illumination; production

Additional personnel

- Robin Thompson – recording engineer
- Tony Page – assistant engineer
- Barry Godber – cover illustrations

== Charts ==
Chart (1969–70)	Peak position
Australian Albums (Kent Music Report)	7
Canada Top Albums/CDs (RPM)	27
Japanese Albums (Oricon)	96
UK Albums (Official Charts)	5
US Billboard 200	28

Chart (2019–20)	Peak position
Italian Albums (FIMI)	89
UK Progressive Albums (Official Charts)	9

Chart (2022)	Peak position
German Albums (Offizielle Top 100)	73
Scottish Albums (Official Charts)	39
UK Rock & Metal Albums (Official Charts)	3
UK Independent Albums (Official Charts)	6

== Certifications ==
Region	Certification	Certified units/sales
Canada (Music Canada)	Platinum	100,000^{^}
France (SNEP)	2× Gold	200,000^{*}
Italy (FIMI) 2004 release	Gold	25,000^{*}
Japan (RIAJ)	Gold	100,000^{^}
United Kingdom (BPI) 2004 release	Gold	100,000^{^}
United States (RIAA)	Gold	500,000^{^}
^{*} Sales figures based on certification alone.^{^} Shipments figures based on certification alone.
