= 21st Century Schizoid Man =

1969 song by King Crimson

- UK single release

Song by King Crimson

from the album In the Court of the Crimson King
- A-side: "Epitaph"
- Released: 10 October 1969 (album); 1976 (B-side)
- Recorded: 1, 4, 20–21 August 1969
- Genre: Progressive rock; jazz rock; heavy metal
- Length: 7:24 (album version): 6:42 (2014 radio version); 4:46 (KC50 radio edit)
- Label: Island
- Composers: Robert Fripp; Ian McDonald; Greg Lake; Michael Giles
- Lyricist: Peter Sinfield
- Producer: King Crimson

"21st Century Schizoid Man" is a song by the progressive rock band King Crimson, released in October 1969 as the opening track on their debut album In the Court of the Crimson King. Often regarded as the group's signature song, it was described by Rolling Stone as "a seven-and-a-half-minute statement of purpose: rock power, jazz spontaneity, and classical precision harnessed in the service of a common aim" and as an early example of heavy metal.

== Lyrical content ==
The lyrics of "21st Century Schizoid Man" were written by Peter Sinfield and consist chiefly of disconnected phrases which present a series of images in a fixed pattern. The first line of each verse consists of two short phrases, while the second line is a single, more specific image, and the third is a longer phrase or a full sentence. The fourth and last line of each verse is the song's title.

The song criticizes the Vietnam War with the lyrics "Politicians' funeral pyre/Innocents raped with napalm fire" and "death seed", which according to Sinfield refers to a "harvest of bad things" created by the use of Agent Orange. The line "Cat's foot, iron claw" refers to the French fable "The Monkey and the Cat".

Before a live performance of the song on 14 December 1969 (later included on the live album Epitaph), guitarist Robert Fripp sarcastically remarked that the song was dedicated to then-Vice President of the United States Spiro Agnew, "an American political personality whom we all know and love dearly."

== Musical structure ==
The eerie intro sound was created by woodwind and keyboard player Ian McDonald pressing his forearm onto the keys of the studio's bellows-driven reed organ, causing the instrument to malfunction and "wheeze" unpredictably.

The song proper begins with a heavy adagio C minor hexatonic riff in 4/4 played in unison by McDonald on alto saxophone and Robert Fripp on overdriven electric guitar, over a pedal point bass from Greg Lake, until the last three notes, which the bass follows. The first six notes were composed by Lake and the final three longer ones – mostly played as power chords – were added by McDonald. The riff is interspersed with heavily distorted vocals, sung by Lake, accompanied only by staccato C minor seventh chords from Fripp. After two verses the song transitions, via an accelerando on six repeats of the final three power chords of the riff, into a lengthy allegro instrumental middle section in 6/8 called "Mirrors".

"Mirrors" begins with an alternately rising and falling syncopated theme written by Fripp, with saxophone and guitar still playing in unison, before moving into a second section written by McDonald during his army band days called "Three Score and Four", which features an upbeat jazz saxophone riff overlaid with long, sustained guitar notes.

Next comes Robert Fripp's dissonant and almost atonal guitar solo, which was rated number 82 in Guitar World's list of the "Top 100 Greatest Guitar Solos" in 2008. Louder Sound ranked the solo at No. 56 in its "100 greatest guitar solos in rock" poll in 2018. Fripp recorded his solo on 4 August 1969 as an overdub with an alternating down-up fingerpicking technique. It is followed by a double tracked alto saxophone solo from Ian McDonald. McDonald believed that his earlier attempts at the solo were unsatisfactory, so he recorded the solo in a crouching position, believing that it would add a sense of "angst" to his playing.

After a reprise of "Three Score and Four", the song transitions immediately into a "start-stop" section written by Fripp consisting of sixteenth-note lines played by the guitar and saxophone in unison once again, accompanied by snare drum and pedal point bass guitar. Fripp explained to Guitar Player magazine in 1974: "It's all picked down-up. The basis of the picking technique is to strike down on the on-beat and up on the off-beat. Then one must learn to reverse that. I'll generally use a downstroke on the down-beat except where I wish to accent a phrase in a particular way or create a certain kind of tension by confusing accents, in which case I might begin a run on the upstroke."

After a reprise of the main riff and a final verse, the song concludes with an abstract chaotic outro with no discernible meter, inspired by the Duke Ellington Orchestra.

== Reception and legacy ==
Melody Maker wrote in a 1969 review that the song was "brutally exciting" and contributed to the "tremendous impact" of In the Court of the Crimson King. In 2006, Pitchfork ranked "21st Century Schizoid Man" at number 104 on its list of "The 200 Greatest Songs of the 1960s", with Joe Tangari calling it a "seven-minute hellstorm of gonzo guitar, shifting meters, and nasty sax".

The song has been described as heavy metal, jazz-rock and progressive rock, and is considered to be an influence on the later development of progressive metal and industrial music.

Bad Religion's 1990 song "21st Century (Digital Boy)" pays homage to "21st Century Schizoid Man", both in the title and by incorporating some words from the original song.

== Sampling lawsuit ==
American rapper Kanye West sampled "21st Century Schizoid Man" on the song "Power" from his 2010 album My Beautiful Dark Twisted Fantasy. Declan Colgan Music Ltd, the owners of the mechanical licence for "21st Century Schizoid Man", sued Universal Music Group in 2022, alleging that West had originally sampled the song without a licence and that Universal thus owed them unpaid royalties. The case was settled in May 2024.

== Personnel ==
- Robert Fripp – electric guitar
- Ian McDonald – alto saxophone, reed organ
- Greg Lake – bass guitar, vocals
- Michael Giles – drums
- Peter Sinfield – lyrics

== Chart performance ==
Chart (1996)	Peak position
UK Singles (OCC)	89

== See also ==
- List of anti-war songs
