= Live in Japan (21st Century Schizoid Band album) =

Official Bootleg Volume Two: Live in Japan

Live album by 21st Century Schizoid Band
- Released: 2003
- Recorded: 6 November, 2002
- Venues: Shinjuku Kōsei Nenkin Hall, Tokyo, Japan
- Genre: Progressive Rock
- Length: 79:00
- Label: 21st Century Schizoid Band

21st Century Schizoid Band chronology
Official Bootleg Volume One (2002)	Official Bootleg Volume Two: Live in Japan (2003)	Live in Italy (2003)

Live in Japan is the second "Official Bootleg" release by the 21st Century Schizoid Band. It was released on CD and DVD, the DVD containing the extra tracks "Tomorrow's People" and "If I Was", as well as bonus features.

== Track listing ==
1. "Schizoid Intro" (Jakko Jakszyk) – 2:00
2. "A Man, A City" (Robert Fripp, Ian McDonald, Greg Lake, Michael Giles, Peter Sinfield) – 8:35
3. "Cat Food" (Fripp, McDonald, Sinfield) – 4:26
4. "Let There Be Light" (McDonald, Sinfield) – 3:26
5. "Progress" (M. Giles) – 7:04
6. "The Court of the Crimson King" (McDonald, Sinfield) – 7:51
7. "Formentera Lady" (Fripp, Sinfield) – 12:07
8. "Tomorrow's People" (M. Giles) – 8:04 [DVD only]
9. "If I Was" (McDonald, Leray) – 4:51 [DVD only]
10. "Ladies of the Road" (Fripp, Sinfield) – 7:46
11. "I Talk to the Wind" (McDonald, Sinfield) – 6:25
12. "Epitaph" (Fripp, Lake, McDonald, Giles, Sinfield) – 9:30
13. "Birdman" (McDonald) – 4:36
14. "21st Century Schizoid Man" (Fripp, McDonald, Lake, Giles, Sinfield) – 10:29

=== Bonus features ===
- Interviews with:
1. Ian McDonald – 3:58
2. Mike Giles – 3:45
3. Peter Giles – 6:36
4. Jakko Jakszyk – 2:36
5. Mel Collins – 1:53
- In the Studio 22-08-02 – 9:37
- Canterbury Fayre 24-08-02 – 12:17
- Queen Elizabeth Hall 30-09-02 – 10:19

== Personnel ==
- Jakko Jakszyk – guitar, lead vocals, keyboards, flute
- Ian McDonald – alto saxophone, flute, keyboards, lead and backing vocals
- Mel Collins – alto, tenor and baritone saxophones, flute, keyboards, backing vocals
- Peter Giles – bass, backing vocals
- Michael Giles – drums, percussion, lead and backing vocals

== Song origins ==
- "A Man, A City" was originally performed live by King Crimson, subsequent to the release of their debut studio album In the Court of the Crimson King. It became "Pictures of a City", which appeared on the second King Crimson studio album In the Wake of Poseidon. Live performances of the piece by King Crimson in 1969 were released in 1997, on the compilation Epitaph, and in 2004, on Live at Fillmore East.
- The Court of the Crimson King, I Talk to the Wind, Epitaph, and 21st Century Schizoid Man originally appeared on "In the Court of the Crimson King".
- Cat Food originally appeared on "In the Wake of Poseidon".
- "Let There Be Light" and "If I Was" originally appeared on Ian McDonald's solo studio release, Drivers Eyes.
- "Progress" originally appeared on Michael Giles' solo studio release, Progress.
- "Formentera Lady" and "Ladies of the Road" originally appeared on King Crimson's fourth studio album, Islands.
- "Tomorrow's People" and "Birdman" originally appeared on the 1971 studio album McDonald and Giles.
