= Progress (Michael Giles album) =

Studio album by Michael Giles
- Released: 4 November 2002
- Recorded: 1978
- Studio: The Cottage Studio, Dorset, England
- Genre: Jazz fusion, progressive rock
- Producer: Michael Giles

Michael Giles chronology
McDonald and Giles (With Ian McDonald) (1970)	Progress (2002)	Official Bootleg V.1 (With 21st Century Schizoid Band) (2002)

Progress is a solo album recorded by original King Crimson drummer Michael Giles. It was recorded in 1978, but unreleased until 2002.

== Overview ==
The album was recorded in the 70s (mostly in 1978) in Giles home studio after he and former King Crimson keyboardist and woodwind player Ian McDonald recorded their 1970 collaborative album McDonald and Giles. It was released in 2002, 24 years after being completed. It was only released on CD, with no vinyl or (official) digital release.

The album features extensive contributions from Caravan multi-instrumentalist Geoffrey Richardson, who plays guitar, viola, flute, and fretless bass. The album also features Giles, Giles and Fripp alumni and Giles' brother, Peter Giles, who plays bass guitar on most tracks. With the exception of track 6, John G. Perry played bass on some of the remaining songs. Keyboards were played by Giles, Canterbury-based keyboardist Dave MacRae and Strawbs keyboardist John Mealing

Giles handles vocals & voices on 4 of the 12 tracks on the album (with contributions from Perry and Richardson on 3 & 5 respectively) with 6 of the tracks being instrumentals and the other 2 tracks feature voices by folk singer Catherine Howe. The album features a small brass section on two tracks which was arranged by Derek Wadsworth and features the alto sax, trumpet, flugelhorn and trombone.

== Track listing ==
All words and music composed, recorded and produced by Michael Giles.

No.	Title	Vocals	Length
1.	"Sunrise"	Instrumental	0:56
2.	"Departure"	Instrumental	3:13
3.	"Rolling"	Giles with John G. Perry	3:47
4.	"Daydream"	Instrumental	1:00
5.	"Moving"	Giles with Geoffrey Richardson	4:14
6.	"Midsummer Day"	Giles	6:01
7.	"Progress"	Giles	6:03
8.	"Sunset"	Catherine Howe	3:46
9.	"Shunter"	Instrumental	2:43
10.	"Rocking"	Instrumental	2:10
11.	"Night Dream"	Instrumental	2:08
12.	"Arrival"	Howe	6:08
Total length:			42:08

== Personnel ==
Per Discogs

=== Musicians ===
- Michael Giles – drums (2, 3, 5, 7, 8, 9, 10, 11, 12), percussion (1, 2, 3, 6, 9, 11, 12), keyboards (9), piano (1, 2, 4, 6), electric piano (2, 3), clavinet (10), vocals & voices (3, 5, 6, 7), "naive guitar" (6)
- Geoffrey Richardson – guitar (1, 2, 3, 6, 7, 12), flute (4, 5, 6, 8, 12), viola (4, 6, 8), voice (5), fretless bass (6)
- Dave MacRae – piano solo (2), electric piano (5, 12), Hammond organ (10)
- John Mealing – electric piano solo (3), electric piano (4, 10), piano (8)
- Peter Giles – bass guitar (2, 4, 5, 7, 10, 12)
- John G. Perry – bass guitar (3, 8), voice (3)
- Catherine Howe – voice (8, 12)
- Ray Warleigh – alto saxophone (7, 12)
- Martin Drover – trumpet (7), flugelhorn (7, 12)
- Pete Thoms – trombone (7, 12)
- Michael Blakesley – trombone (8, 10)
- Colin Bryant – clarinet (10)
- Jimmy Hastings – tenor saxophone (10)

=== Production ===
- Derek Wadsworth – brass arranger (7, 12)
- Rob Ayling – coordination
- Hugh O'Donnell – design
- Michael Giles – liner notes, photograph [Cottage And Rainbow Photos] (as M. G)
- Simon Heyworth – Mastering at HDCD mastering
- William Giles – painting
- David K. Wells – photograph [Photography And Image Preparation]
- Hugh Padgham – post production
