= Live in Italy (21st Century Schizoid Band album) =

Official Bootleg Volume Three: Live in Italy

Live album by 21st Century Schizoid Band
- Released: 2003
- Recorded: 25 March, 2003
- Venue: Naima Club, Forli, Emilia-Romagna, Italy
- Genre: Progressive Rock
- Length: 53:00
- Label: 21st Century Schizoid Band

21st Century Schizoid Band chronology
Live in Japan (2002)	Official Bootleg Volume Three: Live in Italy (2003)	Pictures of a City – Live in New York (2006)

Live in Italy is the third installment of the "Official Bootleg" series from the 21st Century Schizoid Band. It is the first album to feature new drummer Ian Wallace, who replaced founder member Michael Giles earlier that year.

== Track listing ==
1. "Schizoid Intro" (Jakszyk) – 2:00
2. "A Man, A City" (Robert Fripp, Ian McDonald, Greg Lake, Michael Giles, Peter Sinfield) – 8:36
3. "Let There Be Light" (McDonald, Sinfield) – 3:26
4. "The Court of the Crimson King" (McDonald, Sinfield) – 7:53
5. "Ladies of the Road" (Fripp, Sinfield) – 7:10
6. "Improv - Sailor's Tale" (Fripp) – 11:55
7. "Birdman" (McDonald) – 4:40
8. "Epitaph" (Fripp, McDonald, Lake, Giles, Sinfield) – 8:41
9. "Catley's Ashes" (Studio track; Jakszyk) – 7:06

== Personnel ==
- Mel Collins – baritone, tenor and alto sax, flute, keyboards and backing vocals
- Peter Giles – bass guitar and backing vocals
- Jakko M. Jakszyk – guitar, lead vocals, flute and keyboards
- Ian McDonald – alto sax, flute, keyboards and vocals
- Ian Wallace – drums, percussion and backing vocals
