= Trendsetters Limited =

- Genres: Beat music
- Years active: 1964–1967
- Label: Parlophone
- Past members: Michael Giles; Peter Giles; Mike Blakesley; Geoff Robinson; Al Kirtley; Bruce Turner; Allan Azern

Trendsetters Limited was a manufactured pop band, active in the 1960s. The group is best known for featuring future King Crimson members Michael Giles and his brother Peter.

== History ==
Trendsetters Limited was a beat group created in early 1964 by Bournemouth businessman, Roy Simon. Prior to engaging a local music agent to find suitable local musicians, Simon claimed to have carried out extensive market research to identify the key characteristics desired by young, mostly female, record-buyers. Although musicianship had scored lower than a sense of humour, sex-appeal and personality, the members actually selected were all experienced musicians and included drummer Michael Giles and his brother, bassist Peter, later of Giles, Giles and Fripp and King Crimson, who had already recorded with Joe Meek. As a lover of big band music, Roy Simon had also decided to add trombone to the line-up to give the band a distinctive sound, and local jazz trombonist Mike Blakesley was recruited. The original line-up was completed by guitarist and songwriter Geoff Robinson and pianist Al Kirtley, formerly of Zoot Money's Big Roll Band, who had previously worked with the Giles brothers as lead guitarist in Dave Anthony and the Rebels. All members of the band were required to have at least some vocal ability. At an early stage Robinson decided not to pursue a full-time musical career (although some of his original songs were subsequently recorded by the band) and was replaced by Bruce Turner, a guitarist/vocalist from Andover. Trendsetters Limited released their first single, "In a Big Way", on 26 March 1964 on Parlophone Records, but despite widespread publicity, including an appearance alongside Henry Mancini on Southern Television's "Three-Go-Round", airplay on BBC Television's Juke Box Jury and subsequently four 15-minute shows on Radio Luxembourg, the record failed to enter the charts. Al Kirtley left the band shortly afterwards and was replaced on piano by a local club-owner, Allan Azern. The band's second single, "Hello Josephine" also failed to make the charts, as did a third single, "I'm Coming Home", released in 1965. Trendsetters Limited continued to tour England and Germany but in 1966 Bruce Turner left. They continued for a short time as a four-piece under the name "The Trend" and later "The Brain" and recorded a number of tracks at Abbey Road, for some of which former band-member Al Kirtley was brought back on piano and piano-accordion. These were eventually released in 2009 as part of The Giles Brothers 1962–1967 album. The band finally disbanded in 1967.

== Discography ==
- 1964: "In a Big Way"/"Lucky Date", Parlophone R5118
- 1964: "Hello Josephine"/"Move on Over", Parlophone R5161 ("Move on Over" was re-released in 2007 as an album track on Try Me Out: Ballroom Beat Vol. 2.)
- 1964: "Go Away"/"Lollipops and Roses", Parlophone R5191
- 1965: "You've Sure Got a Funny Way of Showing Your Love"/I'm Coming Home", Parlophone R5324 (as Trendsetters)
