= Tomorrow People =

Tomorrow People or variant may refer to:

- The Tomorrow People, a British science fiction franchise, with a 1970s TV show, 1990s TV show, 2000s CD audio series
- The Tomorrow People (American TV series), 2013 American remake of the British franchise
- The Tomorrow People (novel), a 1960 science fiction novel by Judith Merril
- Tomorrow People (band), a seven-member New Zealand reggae band formed in 2010
- "Tomorrow People", a 1988 song by Ziggy Marley from the album Conscious Party
- "Tomorrow People", a 1993 song by Billy Idol from the album Cyberpunk
- "Tomorrow's People", a 2001 song by 21st Century Schizoid Band from the album Live in Japan
- "Tomorrow's People – The Children of Today", a track from the 1971 album McDonald and Giles
- "The Tomorrow People", a 1963 melody by Raymond Scott featured on the album Manhattan Research, Inc.
- "People of Tomorrow", a 2001 song by Eiffel 65 from the album Contact!
- The Tomorrow People (Ultimate X-Men), a story arc in the Ultimate X-Men comics
