= 21st Century Schizoid Band =

Band formed by members of King Crimson (2002–2004)

- Origin: England
- Genres: Rock; progressive rock
- Years active: 2002–2004
- Spinoff of: King Crimson
- Past members: Ian McDonald; Jakko Jakszyk; Mel Collins; Peter Giles; Michael Giles; Ian Wallace

21st Century Schizoid Band were a King Crimson alumnus group formed in 2002.

The name derives from the famous song "21st Century Schizoid Man" from the first King Crimson album, In the Court of the Crimson King. The initial band featured Mel Collins on saxophones, flute and keyboards, Michael Giles on drums, Peter Giles on bass, Ian McDonald on alto saxophone, flute and keyboards, and Jakko Jakszyk on guitar and vocals. All but Jakszyk had previously been members of King Crimson in its early years. Ian Wallace, another former Crimson member from that period, replaced Michael Giles in early 2003 after the band's Japanese tour. Further international touring followed in 2003/04.

The band played live with sets concentrating on compositions from King Crimson's first four albums and other works from the band members' back catalogues, including McDonald and Giles. They have released four albums, mostly of live work but including newer and/or recent compositions, such as Ian McDonald's "Let There Be Light" (from his solo album Driver's Eyes) and "Catley's Ashes", a Jakszyk instrumental which later appeared on his solo album The Bruised Romantic Glee Club (2006).

The band has been inactive since 2004; with members based in different countries, touring proved to be logistically and financially difficult. The possibility of performing again in 2005 was considered following offers from festivals, possibly with Guy Evans (of Van der Graaf Generator) on drums to replace Wallace who had other commitments, but the idea was abandoned. Wallace's death in February 2007 would seem to have closed the lid on the band for good.

Jakszyk and Collins went on to record as a trio with founding Crimson guitarist Robert Fripp (and with rhythmic support from fellow members Tony Levin and Gavin Harrison) on the Scarcity of Miracles album in 2011. This was followed in 2013 by the announcement of a new King Crimson formation including all five, plus two additional members.

== Average setlists ==
=== 2002 ===
1. Pictures of a City (In the Wake of Poseidon by King Crimson)^{[a]}
2. Cat Food (In the Wake of Poseidon by King Crimson)
3. Let There Be Light (Drivers Eyes by Ian McDonald)
4. Progress (Progress by Michael Giles)
5. The Court of the Crimson King (In the Court of the Crimson King by King Crimson)
6. Formentera Lady (Islands by King Crimson)
7. Tomorrow's People (McDonald and Giles by McDonald and Giles)
8. If I Was (Drivers Eyes by Ian McDonald)
9. Ladies of the Road (Islands by King Crimson)
10. I Talk to the Wind (In the Court of the Crimson King by King Crimson)
11. Epitaph (In the Court of the Crimson King by King Crimson)
12. Birdman (McDonald and Giles by McDonald and Giles)

Encore:

1. 21st Century Schizoid Man (In the Court of the Crimson King by King Crimson)

=== 2003 ===
1. Pictures of a City (In the Wake of Poseidon by King Crimson)^{[a]}
2. Cat Food (In the Wake of Poseidon by King Crimson)
3. Let There Be Light (Drivers Eyes by Ian McDonald)
4. Cirkus (Lizard by King Crimson)
5. Spend Us Three (Original song; flute trio intro to "Cadence and Cascade")
6. Cadence and Cascade (In the Wake of Poseidon by King Crimson)
7. The Court of the Crimson King (In the Court of the Crimson King by King Crimson)
8. Ladies of the Road (Islands by King Crimson)
9. Catley's Ashes (Then original song, later recorded and released by Jakko M. Jakszyk on The Bruised Romantic Glee Club, featuring Mel Collins)
10. 21st Century Schizoid Man (In the Court of the Crimson King by King Crimson)
11. Formentera Lady (Islands by King Crimson)
12. I Talk to the Wind (In the Court of the Crimson King by King Crimson)
13. Epitaph (In the Court of the Crimson King by King Crimson)
14. Birdman (McDonald and Giles by McDonald and Giles)

Encore:

1. Starless (Red by King Crimson)

=== 2004 ===
1. Pictures of a City (In the Wake of Poseidon by King Crimson)^{[a]}
2. Cat Food (In the Wake of Poseidon by King Crimson)
3. Let There Be Light (Drivers Eyes by Ian McDonald)
4. Cirkus (Lizard by King Crimson)
5. Spend Us Three (Original song; flute trio intro to "Cadence and Cascade")
6. Cadence and Cascade (In the Wake of Poseidon by King Crimson)
7. The Court of the Crimson King (In the Court of the Crimson King by King Crimson)
8. Ladies of the Road (Islands by King Crimson)
9. Catley's Ashes (Then original song, later recorded and released by Jakko M. Jakszyk on The Bruised Romantic Glee Club, featuring Mel Collins)
10. Formentera Lady (Islands by King Crimson)
11. Sailor's Tale (Islands by King Crimson)
12. I Talk to the Wind (In the Court of the Crimson King by King Crimson)
13. Epitaph (In the Court of the Crimson King by King Crimson)
14. 21st Century Schizoid Man (In the Court of the Crimson King by King Crimson)
15. Birdman (McDonald and Giles by McDonald and Giles)

Encore:

1. Starless (Red by King Crimson)

== Band members ==
- Jakko Jakszyk – lead vocals, guitar, flute (2002–2004; became member of King Crimson 2013–2021)
- Mel Collins – saxophones, flute, keyboards, backing vocals (2002–2004; member of King Crimson 1970–1972 and 2013–2021, also sessions 1970 and 1974)
- Ian McDonald – alto saxophone, flute, keyboards, vocals (2002–2004; member of King Crimson 1968–1969; also sessions in 1974 and member of Giles, Giles and Fripp; died 2022)
- Peter Giles – bass, backing vocals (2002–2004; sessions in 1970 also member of Giles, Giles and Fripp)
- Michael Giles – drums, percussion, vocals (2002–2003; member of King Crimson 1968–1969, also sessions in 1970 and member of Giles, Giles and Fripp)
- Ian Wallace – drums, percussion, vocals (2003–2004; member of King Crimson 1970–1972; died 2007)

== Discography ==
- Official Bootleg Volume One (2002)
- Live in Japan (2003, CD and DVD)
- Live in Italy (2003)
- Pictures of a City – Live in New York (2006, recorded 2004)
- Live in Barcelona (2024, recorded 2003)

=== Albums performed members contributed to ===
Artist	King Crimson					McDonald and Giles	Ian McDonald	Michael Giles	Jakko M. Jakszyk
Member	In the Court of the Crimson King (1969)	In the Wake of Poseidon (1970)	Lizard (1970)	Islands (1971)	Red (1974)	McDonald and Giles (1970)	Drivers Eyes (1999)	Progress (2002)	The Bruised Romantic Glee Club (2006)
Ian McDonald	•				•	•	•		•
Michael Giles	•	•				•	•	•	
Peter Giles		•				•		•	
Mel Collins		•	•	•	•				•
Ian Wallace				•					•
Jakko Jakszyk									•

== Notes ==
a.^{1} ^{2} ^{3} Titled "A Man, a City" on some live albums. This title was used by the 1969 lineup of King Crimson, which played the song live before it was recorded for In the Wake of Poseidon. However, "A Man, a City" had a different arrangement and lyrics from the album version. The Schizoid Band based their arrangement on the latter, so this article uses that title for consistency.
