= Official Bootleg Volume One =

Live album by 21st Century Schizoid Band
- Released: 2002
- Recorded: Thursday 22 August, 2002
- Studio: Mark Angelo Studios, London, England
- Genre: Progressive Rock
- Length: 53:49
- Label: 21st Century Schizoid Band

21st Century Schizoid Band chronology
Official Bootleg Volume One (2002)	Live in Japan (2002)

Official Bootleg Volume One is the first CD release by the 21st Century Schizoid Band. It features the band live in the studio, playing songs which they had previously performed in King Crimson.

== Track list ==
1. "A Man, A City" (Robert Fripp, Ian McDonald, Greg Lake, Michael Giles, Peter Sinfield) – 8:25
2. "Cat Food" (Fripp, McDonald, Sinfield) – 4:50
3. "The Court of the Crimson King" (McDonald, Sinfield) – 7:26
4. "Formentera Lady" (Fripp, Sinfield) – 12:42
5. "Ladies of the Road" (Fripp, Sinfield) – 7:14
6. "I Talk to the Wind" (McDonald, Sinfield) – 5:23
7. "21st Century Schizoid Man" (Fripp, McDonald, Lake, Giles, Sinfield) – 7:37

== Personnel ==
- Jakko Jakszyk – guitar, lead vocals
- Ian McDonald – saxophones, flute, keyboards, backing vocals
- Mel Collins – saxophones, flute, keyboards, backing vocals
- Peter Giles – bass, backing vocals
- Michael Giles – drums, percussion
