= Drivers Eyes =

Studio album by Ian McDonald
- Released: 1999
- Studio: Clinton Recording Studios, NY; Pie Studios, Glen Cove, NY; Pilot Recording Studios, New York; RPM Studios, New York, NY
- Genre: Hard rock, progressive rock
- Length: 45:44
- Label: Camino Records
- Producer: Ian McDonald

Ian McDonald chronology
McDonald and Giles (With Michael Giles) (1970)	Drivers Eyes (1999)	Official Bootleg V.1 (With 21st Century Schizoid Band) (2002)

Drivers Eyes is the first and only solo album by former King Crimson and Foreigner member Ian McDonald. It features contributions from Peter Frampton, Ian Lloyd, Gary Brooker, Steve Hackett and Hugh McCracken and King Crimson alumni, Michael Giles and John Wetton.

== Overview ==
The album appears nearly 20 years after his double-platinum days with Foreigner and practically 30 years to the day after his debut with King Crimson. The record contains the influences of both bands, which isn't surprising since McDonald was a central creative force in both. McDonald is backed by most of the people that he had been a sideman for and also been sidemen and band members with.

The album features McDonald on guitars, keyboards, synthesizers and woodwinds on various tracks. He also sings lead vocals on 3 of the 11 tracks with 3 tracks being instrumental and the other 5 tracks being handled by various singers Including John Wetton, Gary Brooker and former Foreigner bandmate, Lou Gramm. The album's overall sound benefitted from guest singers as "his vocals lack some range and power, probably more ideally suited to backing vocals than lead singing." His instrumental ability on synthesizers and saxophone is well complemented by various guitarists including former Saturday Night Live guitarist, G. E. Smith (who is also based in New York) and ex-Genesis guitarist Steve Hackett (who McDonald had performed with as a sideman with on his live album The Tokyo Tapes and Genesis Revisited project). The final track was co-written by his former writing partner in King Crimson, Peter Sinfield.

== Track listing ==
per AllMusic and Discogs

All tracks are written by Ian McDonald (except noted)

No.	Title	Writer(s)	Vocals	Length
1.	"Overture"		Instrumental	2:38
2.	"In Your Hands"	Ian McDonald, Brian Stanley	Ian McDonald	4:19
3.	"You Are a Part of Me"		John Waite	5:04
4.	"Sax Fifth Avenue"		Instrumental	4:21
5.	"Forever and Ever"	Ian McDonald, John Wetton	John Wetton	5:08
6.	"Saturday Night in Tokyo"		Ian McDonald with Mitch Weissman	2:52
7.	"Hawaii"		Instrumental	5:14
8.	"Straight Back to You"	Lou Gramm, Ian McDonald	Lou Gramm	4:46
9.	"If I Was"	Ken Leray, Ian McDonald	Ian McDonald with Ian Lloyd	4:28
10.	"Demimonde"		Ian McDonald and Michael Giles	3:28
11.	"Let There Be Light"	Ian McDonald, Peter Sinfield	Gary Brooker	3:26
Total length:				45:44

== Personnel ==
=== Musicians ===
- Ian McDonald – flute (1, 5, 11), alto sax (4, 8, 10), bass clarinet and clarinet (11), acoustic guitar (1, 3, 4, 5), guitars (2, 6, 7, 8, 9, 10), bass and Hammond organ (10), electric piano (3, 4, 10), piano (5, 7, 9), synthesizer (all but 6), string arrangements and clavinet (11), percussion (3, 10), vocals (2, 6, 9, 10), backing vocals (5)
- G.E Smith – lead guitar (2, 3, 6)
- Hugh McCracken – lead guitar (4)
- Steve Hackett – harmonica (3), lead guitar (8)
- Peter Frampton – lead guitar (9)
- Stephen Gosling – piano (2)
- Park Stickney – harp (7)
- Immanuel Davis and Keith Underwood – flute and piccolo (11)
- Paul Ossola – bass (1, 4)
- Kenny Aaronson – bass (all but 1, 4 and 10)
- Steve Holley – drums (all but 10), percussion (1, 3, 4, 9)
- Michael Giles – drums, percussion and vocals (10)

=== Production ===
- Dan Coleman – string arrangements (1, 3, 6, 9, 11)
- Harry Pearce – design
- Greg Calbi – mastering at Sterling Sound
- Dominick Maita – mixing at RPM Studios
- Ian McDonald – production and mixing
