= McDonald and Giles =

Studio album by McDonald and Giles
- Released: November 1970
- Recorded: May–July 1970
- Studio: Island Studios, London
- Genre: Progressive rock
- Length: 46:04; 45:23 (2002 reissue)
- Label: Island (UK & Europe); Cotillion (US & Canada); Atlantic (Australia, New Zealand, Japan & South America); Polydor (1977 UK reissue); Virgin (2002 CD reissue)
- Producer: Ian McDonald, Michael Giles

Ian McDonald chronology
McDonald and Giles (1970)	Drivers Eyes (1999)

Michael Giles chronology
McDonald and Giles (1970)	Progress (2002)

McDonald and Giles is an album released by British musicians Ian McDonald and Michael Giles in 1970. The album was first issued on Island Records (ILPS 9126) in the UK and Cotillion Records (SD 9042), a division of Atlantic Records, in the US. (The album was released on Atlantic itself in several countries.) The album was recorded at Island Studios between May and July 1970. Although McDonald and Giles remains popular among King Crimson fans, its commercial success was limited. The duo did not record a second album, but Giles did contribute drums and vocals to "Demimonde" on McDonald's solo album Drivers Eyes.

== Background and recording ==
Full outer gatefold of original international LP pressing; from left to right: Charlotte Bates (McDonald's girlfriend), Ian McDonald, Michael Giles and Mary Land (Giles' wife)

Ian McDonald and Michael Giles were members of the original King Crimson line-up, and were featured performers on the band's debut album, In the Court of the Crimson King (1969). Both left the group at the end of its first United States tour in early 1970, although Giles agreed to play on the second King Crimson album, In the Wake of Poseidon (1970). Two other King Crimson members also worked on McDonald and Giles: Peter Giles and Peter Sinfield.

The music on McDonald and Giles emulates many of the pastoral and musically complex elements of King Crimson, while generally avoiding that band's darker tendencies. The song "Flight of the Ibis" has a melody and rhythm similar to King Crimson's "Cadence and Cascade," with different lyrics. The album contains a guest appearance by Steve Winwood, playing organ and piano on "Turnham Green". Winwood's group Traffic were working on John Barleycorn Must Die at Island Studios at the same time.

Michael Giles' drum solo in "Tomorrow's People – The Children of Today" has been sampled by a number of rap and hip-hop artists, most notably the Beastie Boys, on the track "Body Movin'", from the album Hello Nasty.

The first CD edition was released in Japan in the early 1990s. It came in both jewel box and paper sleeve versions. This version was the same as the original vinyl but was mastered from a tape copy several generations removed from the original master. In 2002 the group members authorised a revised version of the CD with improved sound. The revised version can be recognised by the use of green lettering on the cover instead of pink. A phrase near the beginning of "Suite in C" has slightly different lyrics. Some of the tracks of the 2002 edition have very minor editing. There are a few slightly different segues in the song "Birdman" and the sections of this song are marked as separate tracks on the CD.

== Critical reception ==
Professional ratings
Review scores
Source	Rating
AllMusic	4/5 stars
Hi-Fi News & Record Review	50 : A

Fred Dellard gave the record a perfect score of "50 : A" in Hi-Fi News & Record Review, indicating a "top class recording" "of special merit". He wrote that Giles and McDonald "take the best of King Crimson and turn it into a highly personal series of sketches that stun with their pure majesty. If Debussy had been working within the confines of modern pop music perhaps he would have produced something like this." A reviewer in Cash Box called the two sides of the record "gentle complex music that moves from one important statement to another with free-wheeling grace", comparing it to the albums of Mountain, Elton John and Emerson, Lake & Palmer in that Giles and McDonald "create their own musical world that is the mark of rock in its highest and purest form".

Record World was less enthusiastic, writing that the duo "specialize in a kind of pretty-rock that, at its best, is reminiscent of Beatles–Bee Gees ballads, and, at its worst, is reminiscent of Muzak". A review in The Guardian Journal opined that "one can't help wishing [Giles and McDonald] would employ a little more discipline and a little less self-indulgence in their work" despite the duo's "undeniable musical accomplishments". In particular the reviewer thought that, with "Birdman", "moods are created and then snatched away just as they begin to develop, and the effect is often patchy". The reviewer singled out "Turnham Green" and "Flight of the Ibis" as the album's best tracks. Writing retrospectively in AllMusic, Steven McDonald wrote that the main draw of the record "is really the performances turned in by McDonald and the Giles brothers—they all sound fabulous, even when waffling musically, while Michael Giles has a unique drum tone that never has been duplicated".

== Track listing ==
Side A
No.	Title	Writer(s)	Length
1.	"Suite in C" (including "Turnham Green", "Here I Am" and others)	Ian McDonald	11:21
2.	"Flight of the Ibis"	McDonald, B. P. Fallon	3:18
3.	"Is She Waiting?"	McDonald	2:40
4.	"Tomorrow's People – The Children of Today"	Michael Giles	7:00

Side B
No.	Title	Writer(s)	Length
1.	"Birdman", involving: 1. "The Inventor's Dream (O.U.A.T.)"; 2. "The Workshop"; 3. "Wishbone Ascension"; 4. "Birdman Flies!"; 5. "Wings in the Sunset"; 6. "Birdman – The Reflection"	McDonald, Peter Sinfield	21:45

From the liner notes:

- "Suite in C" was written by Ian McDonald in Detroit, Los Angeles and Earl's Court between December 1969 and February 1970.
- "Is She Waiting?" was written in Earls Court in the summer of 1969, between King Crimson gigs.
- "Birdman" was mostly written in the spring of 1968, apart from the Flying bit which was done in 1970. Original idea by Peter Sinfield. "Wishbone Ascension" was performed live by King Crimson in 1969 as a part of the once performed live prog epic "Trees", which also included Fripp's penned "Pictures of a City." The transition to the bridge part appear in both "Wishbone Ascension" and "Pictures of a City"
- "Tomorrow's People" was written by Michael Giles in 1967, and expanded and arranged in 1970. The song was dedicated to Tina and Mandy, his children.
- The lyrics for "Birdman" begin "Long ago / In Walthamstow". Walthamstow Marshes was the location of Alliott Verdon Roe's attempts to build and fly his early aeroplanes. (A. V. Roe was the first British aviator and founder of Avro Aircraft Company).
- The parenthetical acronym in the title of "The Inventor's Dream (O.U.A.T.)" stands for "Once Upon a Time".
- "Flight of the Ibis" shares similarities to "Cadence & Cascade" on "In The Wake of Poseidon" in melody and, indeed, "Ibis" had the "Cadence & Cascade" lyric at one point. When McDonald left the band he took his music with him, while Sinfield retained the lyric. Fripp composed a song that used the lyric and had some similarities to "Ibis" in terms of structure, melody and chord progression to provide enough material for the second King Crimson album.

== Personnel ==
=== Musicians ===
- Ian McDonald – guitar, piano, organ, saxes, flute, clarinet, zither, vocals and sundries
- Michael Giles – drums, percussion (including milk bottle, handsaw, lip whistle and nutbox), vocals
- Peter Giles – bass guitar
- Steve Winwood – organ, and piano solo on "Turnham Green"
- Michael Blakesley – trombone on "Tomorrow's People"

=== Technical ===
- Ian McDonald and Michael Giles – producers & arrangers
- Brian Humphries – engineer
- Richard Digby Smith – assistant engineer
- Mike Gray – strings and brass arrangements on "Birdman" and "Suite in C"
- Richard DiLello – photography
- Charlotte Bates – painting
