= Michael Giles =

- Born: Michael Rex Giles; 1 March 1942 (age 84); Waterlooville, Hampshire, England
- Genres: Jazz rock, progressive rock
- Occupation: Musician
- Instruments: Drums, percussion, vocals
- Years active: 1960–present

Michael Rex Giles (born 1 March 1942) is an English drummer, percussionist, and vocalist, best known as one of the co-founders of King Crimson in 1968. Prior to the formation of King Crimson, he was part of the eccentric pop and freakbeat trio Giles, Giles and Fripp along with his brother, bassist Peter, and guitarist Robert Fripp. They were active between 1967–1968.

== Life and career ==
Giles was born in Waterlooville, Hampshire, England.

His drumming technique is complex and polyrhythmic, based primarily on the jazz tradition, but also on the then developing progressive rock tradition. His playing dictated much of the compositional structure of the first King Crimson album, In the Court of the Crimson King. Giles's compositional ear is evidenced by his ability to weave seamless tempo changes and subtle melodic deviations into his drumming throughout the album.

Giles and Ian McDonald both left King Crimson in January 1970, though Giles played on the band's second album, In the Wake of Poseidon, as part of a temporary line-up before the remaining members had a set new line-up in place. He and McDonald recorded an album called McDonald and Giles, which was lighter in style than King Crimson, but still technically demanding. Giles then worked as a session player for the duration of the 1970s, appearing on albums by Anthony Phillips, Leo Sayer, and Kevin Ayers. He also played on McDonald's 1999 solo album Driver's Eyes.

Giles first solo album, Progress, was released in 2001. He released a second solo album titled Shadows/Solo in 2026, which consisted of archival material spanning multiple decades.

In 2002, he co-founded the 21st Century Schizoid Band, a group composed of former King Crimson musicians, with the exception of his son-in-law, guitarist and vocalist Jakko Jakszyk, who later joined King Crimson. After one studio session and a single tour, Giles passed the drum stool to another former King Crimson drummer, Ian Wallace.

In late 2008, an experimental group focused on improvisation was announced, Michael Giles' MAD Band, with Adrian Chivers and Dan Pennie.

He was often cited by Rush drummer Neil Peart as an influence.

== Selected discography ==
=== Giles, Giles and Fripp ===
- 1968 One in a Million/Newly Weds, Thursday Morning/Elephant Song (Singles)
- 1968 The Cheerful Insanity of Giles, Giles and Fripp
- 2001 The Brondesbury Tapes
- 2001 Metamorphosis

=== King Crimson ===
- 1969 In the Court of the Crimson King
- 1970 In the Wake of Poseidon
- 1997 Epitaph

=== McDonald & Giles ===
- 1970 McDonald and Giles

=== Leo Sayer ===
- 1973 Silverbird
- 1974 Just a Boy
- 1975 Another Year

=== Kevin Ayers ===
- 1974 The Confessions of Dr. Dream and Other Stories

=== Roger Glover & Guests ===
- 1974 The Butterfly Ball and the Grasshopper's Feast

=== Neil Sedaka ===
- 1974 Live At The Royal Festival Hall

=== Anthony Phillips ===
- 1978 Wise After the Event
- 1979 Sides

=== Greg Lake ===
- 1980 Greg Lake
- 2015 Ride the Tiger (by Greg Lake & Geoff Downes)

=== Ian McDonald ===
- 1999 Drivers Eyes

=== Penguin Cafe Orchestra ===
- 1984 Broadcasting From Home

=== Bryan Ferry ===
- 1993 Taxi (Title Track)

=== The Michael Giles MAD BAND ===
- 2009 The Adventures of The Michael Giles MAD BAND
- 2011 In The Moment (with Keith Tippett)

=== 21st Century Schizoid Band ===
- 2002 Official Bootleg Volume One
- 2002 Live in Japan – Official Bootleg Volume Two

=== Solo ===
- 2001 Progress (recorded in 1978)
- 2026 Shadows / Solo (compilation)

=== Movie score ===
- 1996 Ghost Dance (recorded in 1983, with Jamie Muir and David Cunningham)
