= In the Wake of Poseidon =

Studio album by King Crimson
- Released: 15 May 1970
- Recorded: 3 February – 6 April 1970
- Studios: Wessex, London
- Genre: Progressive rock
- Length: 41:05
- Labels: Island; Atlantic; Vertigo
- Directors: Robert Fripp; Peter Sinfield
- Producers: Fripp; Sinfield

King Crimson chronology
In the Court of the Crimson King (1969)	In the Wake of Poseidon (1970)	Lizard (1970)

Singles from In the Wake of Poseidon
- 1. "Cat Food" Released: 13 March 1970

In the Wake of Poseidon is the second studio album by the English progressive rock band King Crimson, released in May 1970 by Island Records in Europe, Atlantic Records in the United States, Philips Records in Australia, and Vertigo Records in New Zealand. To date the album is their highest-charting in the UK, reaching number 4.

The album was recorded during a period of instability within the band owing to a fluctuating lineup. It follows a musical style and track sequence very similar to their first album, In the Court of the Crimson King. The album was well received by contemporary critics, who commended the overall execution and production quality as an improvement over that of the band's debut, although later assessments have faulted its heavy reliance on the template established by its predecessor.

== Background ==
Ian McDonald and Michael Giles left the band following their first American tour in late 1969. Around the same time Greg Lake was approached by Keith Emerson to join what would become Emerson, Lake & Palmer. With the absence of McDonald, Robert Fripp took on part of the keyboard-playing role in addition to guitar. As Lake's position in the band was unclear, then-unknown Elton John was booked to sing on the recording sessions for In the Wake of Poseidon, but Fripp had second thoughts and cancelled the booking. Lake ultimately decided to leave, but agreed to sing on the recordings, negotiating to receive King Crimson's PA equipment as payment. He ended up singing on all but one of the album's vocal tracks. The exception was "Cadence and Cascade", which was sung by Fripp's old schoolfriend and teenage bandmate Gordon Haskell. An early mix of the song with Lake singing a guide vocal was later unearthed and featured on the DGM site as a download. Other musicians involved with the album were the briefly returning Michael Giles and his brother Peter on drums and bass respectively, Mel Collins (formerly of the band Circus) on saxophones and flute, and jazz musician Keith Tippett on piano.

During the recording of the album in early 1970, Fripp, Lake, Tippett and the Giles brothers appeared on Top of the Pops miming "Cat Food". This would be King Crimson's only ever appearance on the show.

With the album on sale, Fripp and Sinfield remained in the awkward position of having King Crimson material and releases available, but no band to play it. Fripp persuaded Mel Collins and Gordon Haskell to join the band, with the latter providing bass as well as vocals, and recruited drummer Andy McCulloch, another Dorset musician moving in the West London progressive rock circle, who had previously been a member of Shy Limbs (alongside Greg Lake, who recommended him to Fripp) and Manfred Mann's Earth Band.

== Composition and music ==
The album opens with an a cappella piece called "Peace – A Beginning". An extended version of this piece, "Peace – A Theme", adds a middle eight and is performed on an unaccompanied acoustic guitar. This track appears at the beginning of side two, perhaps conceived as the mid-point of the album, and a third version, "Peace – An End" appears at the conclusion of the album. "Peace – An End" is to some extent a combination of the other two versions, containing both vocals and acoustic guitar as well as the middle eight, but the lyrics are entirely different from those of "Peace – A Beginning".

The strongly jazz fusion-influenced "Pictures of a City" was originally performed live, often extended to over ten minutes and was called "A Man, a City". An example of such a performance appears on the live compilation album Epitaph and in the most recent reissues of In The Court Of The Crimson King as a bonus track. The track was originally a part of the 18 minute jam called Trees. Pieces from the track were also reworked onto tracks like Wishbone ascension (from the mcdonald and giles album) and this song.

The ballad "Cadence and Cascade" is about two groupies the band met while on tour.

The longest track on the album is a dissonant instrumental piece called "The Devil’s Triangle" that is both mechanical and turbulent, eventually descending into chaos. This was adapted from the 1969 band's live arrangement of Gustav Holst's "Mars: Bringer of War" (from his The Planets suite), later released on Epitaph (where the title is shortened to "Mars"). "The Devil's Triangle" employs a different staccato riff than the one from "Mars". In 1971, a brief excerpt from "The Devil’s Triangle" was featured in The Mind of Evil, the second serial of the eighth season of the BBC television series Doctor Who. The track includes part of the chorus from "The Court of the Crimson King", a track from the band's first album, using a studio technique known as xenochrony. Despite this, Ian McDonald, who composed "The Court of the Crimson King", is not given co-writing credit on this segment of "The Devil's Triangle", only on the opening section, "Merday Morn".

== Artwork ==
The work is called The 12 Archetypes or The 12 Faces of Humankind. The colour pictures were painted by Tammo De Jongh in 1967.

The twelve faces in the picture are as follows:

1. The Fool (Fire and Water): The laughing man with a wispy beard.
2. The Actress (Water and Fire): The Egyptian girl with long pearl earrings and many pearl necklaces around her neck, she has tears in her eyes.
3. The Observer (Air and Earth): A scientist type person with round spectacles pushed up above his brow, mostly bald head with white hair at the sides; his left hand is held up to his chin, he looks thoughtful.
4. The Old Woman (Earth and Air): A woman with much wrinkled face wrapped up against the cold.
5. The Warrior (Fire and Earth): A dark and powerful warrior's face in blacks and reds. He wears a steel helmet, broad square face, open mouth with square teeth and a full black beard.
6. The Slave (Earth and Fire): A black African with large gold earrings and a ring through her nose; the lips are full and pink, the eyes half-closed, sultry and sensuous; the expression is warm and friendly.
7. The Child (Water and Air): A picture of innocence; a girl with delicate sweet smile and butterfly shaped bows at each side in her long golden hair; her eyes are large and watery and she has a delicate sweet smile on her mouth. She wears a gold chain, on the end of which is a small golden key.
8. The Patriarch (Air and Water): An old philosopher, with a long face and long white hair and long white beard and moustache; white bushy eyebrows; all around are shapes like flowers or snowflakes; the brow is furrowed upwards from the nose in a fan-like fashion.
9. The Logician (Air and Fire): A scientist or wizard type man with long face, dark hair and long dark beard; he appears to hold a long stick or wand with his right hand and his left is held aloft and surrounded by stars.
10. The Joker (Fire and Air): The picture in bright reds and yellows is of a smiling twinkle-eyed Harlequin with his typical gold-stuccoed, triangular hat.
11. The Enchantress (Water and Earth): A sad girl with watery eyes; her long dark hair is blown sideways across her face and brow from right to left.
12. Mother Nature (Earth and Water): Lying asleep in the long grass; their face in silhouette is viewed from the left side and all around are the flowers and butterflies.

== Release ==
Released on 15 May 1970, In the Wake of Poseidon was King Crimson's highest-charting album to date in the UK, reaching number 4.

The album was re-released in 2010 with a near-complete new stereo mix by Steven Wilson and Robert Fripp as part of the 40th Anniversary release sequence. As tape for one track, "The Devil's Triangle", could not be located, the original stereo was included instead. The CD also includes a new mix of "Groon" ("Cat Food"'s B-side), an alternate take of "Peace – An End", and Greg Lake's guide vocal take of "Cadence and Cascade". The DVD-A features a 5.1 mix by Steven Wilson, with "The Devil's Triangle" up-mixed to 5.1 by Simon Heyworth, hi-res stereo versions of the 30th anniversary stereo master, the 2010 album mixes and ten hi-res bonus tracks including the original single "Cat Food"/"Groon", the bonus tracks from the CD, and a number of other session takes, rehearsals and mixes.

== Reception ==
Professional ratings
Review scores
Source	Rating
AllMusic	4.5/5 stars
Christgau's Record Guide	C+
MusicHound	3.5/5
Sputnikmusic	4/5 stars
The Daily Vault	A−

Robert Christgau rated the album higher than the debut, describing it as "more muddled conceptually than In the Court of the Crimson King" but commenting that "they're not afraid to be harsh, they command a range of styles, and their dynamics jolt rather than sledgehammer".

In his retrospective review, AllMusic's Bruce Eder praised the album, saying that it was better produced than their debut, but he also said that it "doesn't tread enough new ground to precisely rival In the Court of the Crimson King". An editor's postscript praised a 24-bit digitally remastered edition released in March 2000. Paul Stump, in his History of Progressive Rock, said the album "marks a decisive shift away from the Baroque pictorialism of Court; as [Robert Fripp biographer Eric] Tamm has observed, Fripp assumed more production duties and took it upon himself to distil the band's sound, introducing a raw, airless edge of asperity to it he would later gloss as 'audio vérité'." However, he criticized the band's adaptation of "Mars".

== Track listing ==
All lyrics are written by Peter Sinfield; all music is composed by Robert Fripp, except where noted.

Side one
No.	Title	Length
1.	"Peace – A Beginning"	0:51
2.	"Pictures of a City" (including "42nd at Treadmill")	7:57
3.	"Cadence and Cascade"	4:35
4.	"In the Wake of Poseidon" (including "Libra's Theme")	8:24
Total length:		21:47

Side two
No.	Title	Music	Length
1.	"Peace – A Theme" (instrumental)		1:15
2.	"Cat Food"	Fripp, Ian McDonald	4:52
3.	"The Devil's Triangle" (instrumental) I. "Merday Morn" (3:47) II. "Hand of Sceiron" (4:01) III. "Garden of Worm" (3:45)	Fripp, McDonald	11:30
4.	"Peace – An End"		1:54
Total length:			19:31

Note: All European LPs issued by Island and Polydor have erroneously printed labels that leave off "Peace – A Theme" and list "The Devil's Triangle" and its three movements as four distinct tracks. Most US and Japanese Atlantic LPs use the correct track listing.

== Personnel ==
Musicians

- Robert Fripp – electric guitar (2, 6, 7), acoustic guitar (1, 3–6, 8), Mellotron Mk II (2, 4, 7), celesta (3), piano (4), devices
- Greg Lake – vocals (1, 2, 4, 6, 8)
- Michael Giles – drums (2–4, 6, 7)
- Peter Giles – bass guitar (2–4, 6, 7)
- Keith Tippett – piano (3, 6, 7), harpsichord (7)
- Mel Collins – alto & baritone saxophones (2), flute (3)
- Gordon Haskell – vocal (3)
- Peter Sinfield – lyrics

Technical

- Robert Fripp – producer, director
- Peter Sinfield – producer, director
- Robin Thompson – recording engineer
- Geoff Workman & Tony Page – assistant engineers

Visual

- Peter Sinfield – sleeve design & inside painting
- Virginia – typography
- Tammo de Jongh – cover painting

== Charts ==
Chart (1970–71)	Peak position
Australian Albums (Kent Music Report)	17
Canada Top Albums/CDs (RPM)	28
UK Albums (Official Charts)	4
US Billboard 200	31
