= Ian McDonald (musician) =

English composer and instrumentalist (1946–2022)

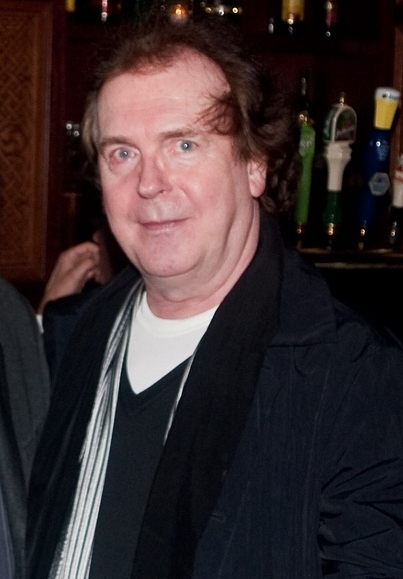
- McDonald in 2009

Background information
- Born: 25 June 1946; Osterley, Middlesex, England
- Died: 9 February 2022 (aged 75) New York City, US
- Genres: Rock; progressive rock; jazz fusion; hard rock
- Occupations: Musician; songwriter
- Instruments: Saxophone; flute; keyboards; guitar; vocals
- Years active: 1968–2022
- Formerly of: King Crimson; Foreigner; Steve Hackett band

Ian Richard McDonald (25 June 1946 – 9 February 2022) was an English musician, composer and multi-instrumentalist, best known as a founding member of the progressive rock band King Crimson in 1968, as well as the hard rock band Foreigner in 1976.

McDonald began his music career as an army musician, where he learned the clarinet and taught himself music theory. He also taught himself to play flute, saxophone, guitar and piano. He co-founded King Crimson and appeared on their 1969 debut album In the Court of the Crimson King, playing Mellotron, keyboards and woodwinds. In the mid-1970s, he moved to New York City where he co-founded Foreigner, appearing on the group's first three albums. He later collaborated with Steve Hackett and played in the King Crimson spin-off group 21st Century Schizoid Band. He was also a session musician, predominantly as a saxophonist. In 2024, McDonald was posthumously inducted into the Rock and Roll Hall of Fame, as a member of Foreigner.

== Biography ==
=== Early life and army ===
McDonald was born on 25 June 1946 in Osterley, Middlesex, the son of Ada (née May) and Keith McDonald, an architect. He grew up in a musical family, regularly listening to records, and taught himself the guitar. His music interests ranged from classical orchestra to dance bands to rock. He was educated at Emanuel School, in Battersea, southwest London. At 15, he left school and began a five-year stint in the British Army as a bandsman. In 1963 he enrolled at the Royal Military School of Music at Kneller Hall, where he took clarinet and learned to read music. He later learned piano, flute and saxophone and taught himself music theory. His experience of playing with army bands gave him great musical adaptability as he had to learn many different musical styles such as show tunes, classical, jazz, and military marches. It was this that honed his style to what eventually became the beginnings of the Prog Rock movement.

=== King Crimson ===
After leaving the army, McDonald moved back to London, and began making music with his girlfriend, former Fairport Convention singer Judy Dyble. The pair were introduced to Robert Fripp and Michael Giles, joining their freakbeat group Giles, Giles and Fripp which led to the formation of King Crimson. However, the relationship ended and she left the band before they played their first gig in 1969, by which time McDonald, Fripp and Giles were joined by Greg Lake and Peter Sinfield.

Three months after their first gig, they supported the Rolling Stones at a free concert in Hyde Park. They stole the show, with The Guardian reporting that the Stones' performance was "indifferent", but that King Crimson were "sensational". McDonald's saxophone solo was a high point on their track "21st Century Schizoid Man", and he went on to play this on their first album In the Court of the Crimson King. He also played harpsichord, piano, organ, clarinet, zither, flute, and Mellotron, which he used extensively on the album. This album jump-started the prog rock era, and paved the way for similar bands such as Yes and Genesis. McDonald composed 2 of the 5 album tracks, including the title track and "I Talk to the Wind" and co-wrote the other 3 tracks with the other group members.

McDonald and drummer Giles left the band due to growing friction. They formed a duo that released one album titled McDonald and Giles, which featured an orchestral backing instead of a Mellotron as used with King Crimson. He reappeared with King Crimson in 1974, guesting on the album Red. After the album's completion, McDonald was asked to rejoin the band as a full member to which he agreed, but ultimately Fripp dissolved the band before any further work could be undertaken.

In 1997, the release of the King Crimson four-CD set Epitaph, consisting of rare live recordings of the 1969 version of King Crimson, renewed interest in the early Crimson material. Out of that interest, the 21st Century Schizoid Band was formed in 2002 and several tours and live albums have followed. The band included former King Crimson members Michael Giles (drums and percussion), Peter Giles (bass), McDonald (sax, flute, keyboards), Mel Collins (alto/tenor sax, flute, keyboards) and also Jakko Jakszyk, who later joined King Crimson in 2013, on guitar and lead vocals. After the first tour, Michael Giles was replaced with another former King Crimson drummer Ian Wallace.

=== Foreigner ===
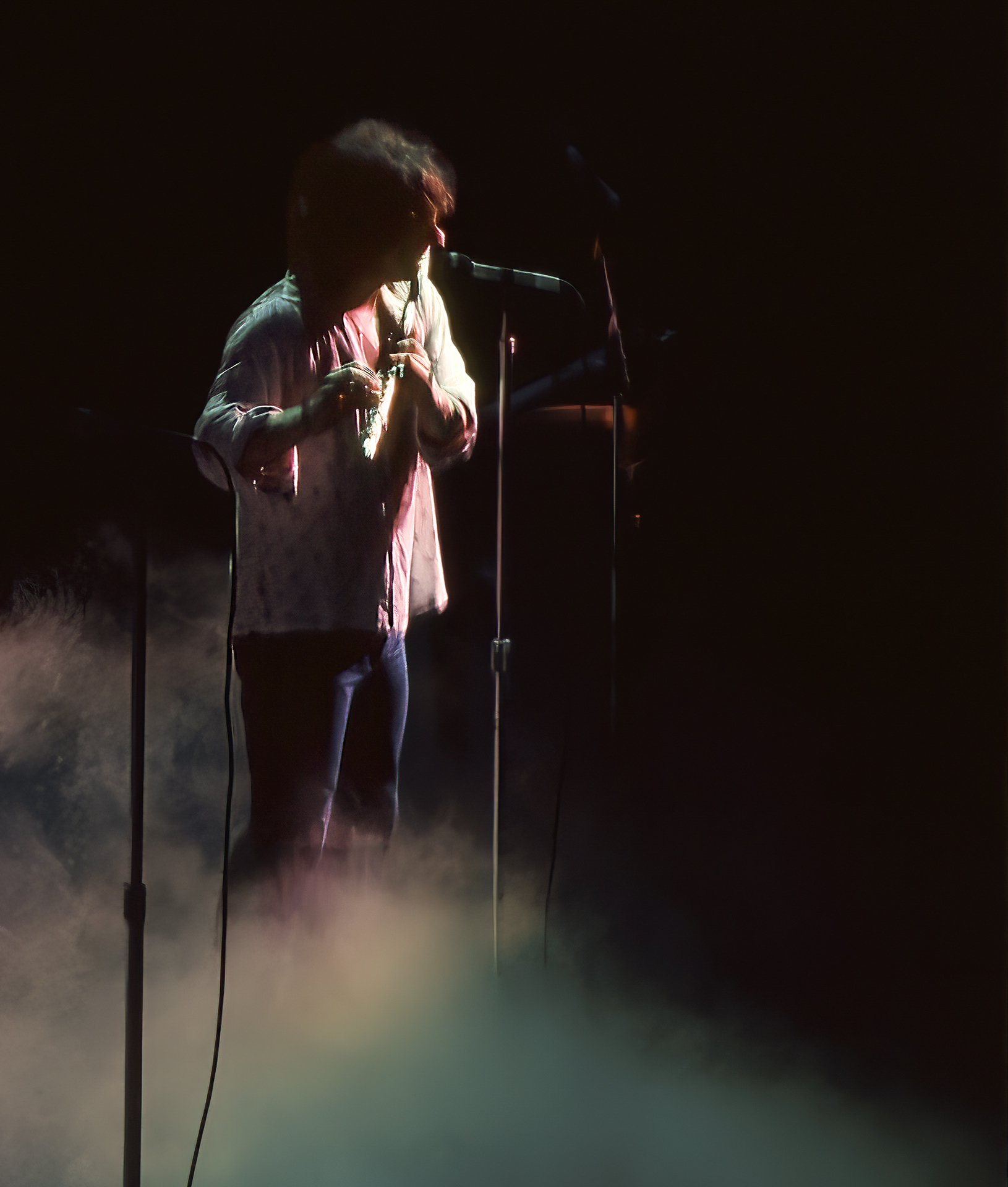
Ian McDonald performing with Foreigner in 1979

McDonald moved to New York City in the mid-1970s. In 1976, he co-formed the band Foreigner with Mick Jones, Lou Gramm, Dennis Elliott, Al Greenwood and Ed Gagliardi, with Gagliardi replaced by Rick Wills in 1979. With Foreigner, McDonald played guitar as well as his woodwinds and keyboards. Although Foreigner was a more conventional rock band compared to King Crimson, McDonald still made significant contributions to the group's arrangement and production. He was with the band for their first three albums - Foreigner (1977), Double Vision (1978) and Head Games (1979) - all of which went multi-platinum and made Foreigner a huge success. McDonald and Al Greenwood both left the band in 1980, after disagreements with group leader Mick Jones.

=== Other work ===
McDonald appeared on To Cry You a Song, a Jethro Tull tribute album released 1996 by Magna Carta Records, appearing on Nothing Is Easy and New Day Yesterday. McDonald was also a session musician and played on T. Rex's hit "Bang a Gong (Get It On)", where he borrowed Mel Collins' baritone saxophone. He also appeared on Centipede's album Septober Energy. He produced the Darryl Way's Wolf album Canis Lupus (1973) and Fruupp's Modern Masquerades (1975). The closing track on Canis Lupus, "McDonald's Lament", was dedicated to him. In 1999, he released a solo album, Drivers Eyes, which featured John Wetton, Lou Gramm, John Waite and Gary Brooker.

In 1996, McDonald toured with former Genesis guitarist Steve Hackett, which was included on the album The Tokyo Tapes. The group included a performance of King Crimson's "The Court of the Crimson King", and "I Talk to the Wind", the tour also included fellow King Crimson alumni John Wetton.

McDonald contributed saxophone and flute to several tracks on Judy Dyble's 2009 release Talking With Strangers. The album saw McDonald reunited with Fripp on the 20-minute "Harpsong".

In 2017, McDonald and singer-guitarist Ted Zurkowski formed the band Honey West, which released an album Bad Old World in 2017.

=== Death ===
McDonald died from colon cancer at his home in New York City on 9 February 2022, at the age of 75. A trailer for a King Crimson documentary was released a week before his death, in which McDonald apologised to Fripp for leaving the band in 1970.

== Selected discography ==
=== Giles, Giles & Fripp ===
- The Brondesbury Tapes (2001) - Recorded between 1967 and 1968. It features Ian McDonald and Judy Dyble.

=== King Crimson ===
- In the Court of the Crimson King (1969)
- In the Wake of Poseidon (1970, co-composer)
- Red (1974, guest)
- Epitaph (1997, recorded 1969)

=== Foreigner ===
- Foreigner (1977)
- Double Vision (1978)
- Head Games (1979)

=== Steve Hackett ===
- Genesis Revisited (1997)
- The Tokyo Tapes (1998)

=== Honey West ===
- Bad Old World (2017)

=== Solo ===
- McDonald and Giles (1970); with Michael Giles
- Drivers Eyes (1999)
