= Peter Giles (musician) =

British singer and bassist

- Genres: Rock, progressive rock, jazz fusion
- Occupation: Musician
- Instruments: Bass guitar, vocals
- Years active: 1960–present

Peter Giles is a British singer and bassist. He is the brother of drummer Michael Giles.

== Biography ==
=== Early career ===
Giles began his career in 1960 with the band Johnny King and The Raiders, composed of Johnny King (vocals), Graham "Wes" Douglas (guitar), Roger Collins (guitar), Giles (bass), and brother Michael (drums). The group never recorded any singles. After Roger Collins left the group, the group disbanded shortly thereafter. In August 1961 the Giles brothers joined Dave Anthony and the Rebels - with singer Tony "Dave Anthony" Head and Al Kirtley (pianist/guitarist). The group mainly played the Bure Club in Mudeford until they disbanded after Al Kirtley left the group and joined Zoot Money's Big Roll Band.

Giles and his brother Michael joined Roy Phillips of The Dovers, which were a backing band for The Dowlands. They played their first date together as The Dowlands & The Soundtracks in November 1961. During their two-year tenure, they accompanied The Dowlands on three unsuccessful singles released on the independent UK label Oriole Records, “Little Sue” (August 1962), “Big Big Fella” (November 1962) and “Break Ups” (April 1963). These three singles can be found on The Dowlands' compilation album All My Loving, released in 1998. Roy Phillips left The Soundtracks in the spring of 1963, being replaced by Alan "Bowery" Barry, formerly of Johnny and the Giants. Six months later in September, Peter and Michael Giles left the group and were replaced by Mike Piggott (bass), formerly of Dave La Kaz and the G Men and former The Dovers member, Johnny Hammond (drums).

The Giles brothers would later play with two rather obscure bands, The Sands Combo and The Interns during the year 1963. In 1964, the brothers formed Trendsetters Limited with which they had recorded four singles. This band later changed its name to The Trend. They were Geoff Robinson (guitar), Al Kirtley (piano), who was later replaced by Allan Azern, Peter (bass), Michael Blakesley (trombone) and Michael Giles (drums). After the group disbanded in 1966, Peter and his brother then opted for another band called The Brain, which released two singles in 1967.

=== From Giles, Giles and Fripp to King Crimson ===
In 1967, Robert Fripp responded to an advertisement placed by Peter and Michael Giles, who wanted to work with a singing organist. Though Robert Fripp was not what they sought, his audition with them was a success and the trio relocated to London and became Giles, Giles and Fripp. Their only studio album, The Cheerful Insanity of Giles, Giles and Fripp, was released in 1968. Despite the recruitment of two further members – singer Judy Dyble (formerly with Fairport Convention and later of Trader Horne) and multi-instrumentalist Ian McDonald – Robert Fripp felt that he was outgrowing the eccentric pop approach favoured by Peter Giles (preferring the more ambitious compositions being written by McDonald) and the band broke up in 1968. Demo recordings from the same time were later released as The Brondesbury Tapes

Following the departure of Peter Giles to other avenues and Judy Dyble to form Trader Horne with keyboardist and singer Jackie McAuley, formerly of the group Them, Michael Giles and Fripp recruited guitarist-bassist-singer Greg Lake and the songwriter Peter Sinfield, which formed King Crimson. King Crimson produced their first album In the Court of the Crimson King in 1969. After a tour in America, Ian McDonald and Michael Giles were disillusioned and left the band to record the album, McDonald and Giles, released in 1971, on which Peter Giles plays bass. Subsequently, both Peter and Michael Giles were part of a temporary line-up of King Crimson for the recording of their second album In The Wake Of Poseidon.

=== 21st Century Schizoid Band ===
Subsequently, Giles appeared on Todd Dillingham's album "Vast Empty Spaces" in 1994 with Mike Wedgwood, Andy Ward and Anthony Aldridge. He returned to music in 2002 with the group 21st Century Schizoid Band who produced four albums with former Crimson musicians, Ian McDonald, Mel Collins on flute, saxophone and keyboards, and Michael Giles on drums, who was replaced in 2003 by another former Crimson, Ian Wallace. In 2009, the compilation album The Giles Brothers 1962 – 1967, on which are found the majority of the singles engraved by the bands with which they played during these years. One of the songs of the band The Brain, One in a Million was covered by Giles, Giles & Fripp on their 1968 album.

=== Personal life ===
Giles is still making original material with his wife Yasmine under the banner name Aluna. One of their more recent albums, released in 2022 is called "Insights."

== Discography ==
=== The Dowlands and The Soundtracks ===
Singles

- 1962 : Little Sue / Julie
- 1962 : Big Big Fella / Don't Ever Change
- 1963 : Breakups / A Love Like Ours

Compilation album (The Dowlands)

- 1998 : All My Loving

=== Trendsetters Limited ===
Singles

- 1964 : In A Big Way / Lucky Date
- 1964 : Go Away / Lollipops And Roses
- 1964 : Hello Josephine / Move On Over
- 1964 : You Sure Got A Funny Way Of Showing Your Love / I'm Coming Home

=== The Trend ===
Singles

- 1966 : Boyfriends And Girlfriends / Shot On Sight

=== The Brain ===
Singles

- 1967 : Kick The Donkey / Nightmares in Red

=== Giles, Giles and Fripp ===
Albums

- 1968 : The Cheerful Insanity Of Giles, Giles And Fripp
- 2001 : The Brondesbury Tapes (1968)
- 2001 : Metaphormosis

=== King Crimson ===
Album

- 1970 : In The Wake Of Poseidon

=== McDonald and Giles ===
Album

- 1970 : McDonald & Giles

=== Todd Dillingham ===
Album

- 1994 : Vast Empty Spaces

=== Michael Giles ===
Solo album

- 2002 : Progress – (Recorded in 1978).

=== 21st Century Schizoid Band ===
CDs

- 2002 : Official Bootleg Volume One
- 2004: Tokyo 2002
- 2004 : Live in Italy
- 2005 : Live in Japan
- 2006 : Pictures of a City – Live in New York – 2 CD

=== Peter Giles and Michael Giles ===
Compilation album

- 2009 : The Giles Brothers 1962 – 1967
