= King Crimson =

English progressive rock band

- Collage of King Crimson members from throughout the band's history. Top: McDonald, Lake, Collins, Muir, Bruford, Gunn, Rieflin; middle: Giles, Wallace, Fripp, Belew, Harrison, Jakszyk; bottom: Sinfield, Burrell, Wetton, Cross, Levin, Mastelotto, Stacey.

Background information
- Origin: London, England
- Genres: Progressive rock; art rock; experimental rock; post-progressive
- Works: Discography
- Years active: 1968–1974; 1981–1984; 1994–2008; 2013–2021
- Labels: Island; Atlantic; Vertigo; Polydor; EG; Virgin; Warner Bros.; Caroline; Discipline Global Mobile
- Spinoffs: McDonald and Giles; Emerson, Lake & Palmer; U.K.; ProjeKcts; 21st Century Schizoid Band; Crimson Jazz Trio; Tuner; Stick Men; Beat
- Spinoff of: Giles, Giles and Fripp
- Past members: Robert Fripp; Michael Giles; Greg Lake; Ian McDonald; Peter Sinfield; Mel Collins; Peter Giles; Gordon Haskell; Andy McCulloch; Boz Burrell; Ian Wallace; Bill Bruford; David Cross; Jamie Muir; John Wetton; Adrian Belew; Tony Levin; Trey Gunn; Pat Mastelotto; Gavin Harrison; Jakko Jakszyk; Bill Rieflin; Jeremy Stacey
- Website: dgmlive.com

King Crimson were an English progressive rock band formed in London in 1968. Led by guitarist and primary composer Robert Fripp – the group's sole constant member throughout their history – the band are widely regarded as a foundational catalyst of the progressive rock movement. They drew inspiration from an expansive array of musical styles, incorporating elements of classical, jazz, folk, heavy metal, gamelan, post-punk, industrial, and experimental music. Beyond shaping contemporaries such as Yes and Genesis, King Crimson's genre-spanning innovations have exerted a lasting influence on subsequent generations of alternative rock, metal, and math rock artists, earning the band an enduring global cult following.

The band was formed by Fripp, Michael Giles, Greg Lake, Ian McDonald, and Peter Sinfield. Their debut album, In the Court of the Crimson King (1969), achieved immediate critical and commercial success, and is widely cited by music historians as a definitive cornerstone of progressive rock. Following the rapid dissolution of the original line-up, the group endured a period of personnel instability, during which time they released In the Wake of Poseidon, Lizard (both 1970), and Islands (1971). In 1972, Fripp refashioned the band's direction by recruiting Bill Bruford (formerly of Yes), John Wetton, David Cross, and Jamie Muir. Leaning heavily into European free improvisation and avant-garde classical structures, the group produced three acclaimed studio albums during this period – Larks' Tongues in Aspic (1973), Starless and Bible Black, and Red (both 1974) – before Fripp disbanded the group at the end of 1974.

King Crimson returned from a seven-year hiatus in 1981 with a revamped, transatlantic line-up featuring Fripp, Bruford, and American musicians Adrian Belew and Tony Levin. Incorporating elements of New York minimalism, gamelan, and contemporary new wave, this iteration recorded a distinct trilogy of studio albums: Discipline (1981), Beat (1982), and Three of a Perfect Pair (1984). After another decade-long dormancy, the band reconstituted in 1994 as a "Double Trio" sextet, adding Pat Mastelotto and Trey Gunn to release Thrak (1995). During the late 1990s, the band members also operated in smaller, improvised sub-groups known as "ProjeKcts". The main group continued into the early 2000s as a "Double Duo" quartet, releasing The ConstruKction of Light (2000) and The Power to Believe (2003), which showcased a heavier, industrial-influenced sound.

Following a brief 40th-anniversary tour in 2008 that introduced drummer Gavin Harrison, Fripp placed the group on hold until 2013. King Crimson then re-emerged as a highly structured touring septet (and later octet) featuring an unusual three-drummer frontline and lead vocalist Jakko Jakszyk. This final incarnation spent seven years performing extensively rearranged material from across the band's entire historical discography, backed by a massive archive of live releases. King Crimson permanently ceased activity at the conclusion of their December 2021 Japanese tour, with Fripp announcing that the band had officially "moved from sound to silence".

== History ==
=== 1967–1968: Giles, Giles & Fripp ===
In August 1967, brothers Michael and Peter Giles, drummer and singer/bassist respectively, and professional musicians in working bands since their mid-teens in Dorset, England, advertised for a "singing organist" to join a new group they were forming. Fellow Dorset musician Robert Fripp – a guitarist who neither sang or played organ – responded, and Giles, Giles & Fripp was born. The trio signed to Deram Records and recorded one album, The Cheerful Insanity of Giles, Giles & Fripp, released in 1968. They hovered on the edge of success, but were never able to make a commercial breakthrough.

Attempting to expand their sound, the three recruited Ian McDonald on keyboards and woodwinds. McDonald brought along two other participants: his then-girlfriend, former Fairport Convention singer Judy Dyble, whose brief tenure with the group ended when the two split, and lyricist, roadie, and art strategist Peter Sinfield, with whom he had been writing songs – a partnership initiated when McDonald had said to Sinfield (regarding his band Creation), "Peter, I have to tell you that your band is hopeless, but you write some great words. Would you like to get together on a couple of songs?" Fripp, meanwhile, saw Clouds at the Marquee Club in London, which spurred him to incorporate classical-inspired melodies into his writing and utilise improvisation to find new ideas.

No longer interested in Peter Giles's more whimsical pop songs, Fripp recommended that his old friend, fellow guitarist and singer Greg Lake, could join to replace either Peter or Fripp himself. Peter Giles later called it one of Fripp's "cute political moves". According to Michael Giles, his brother had become disillusioned with the band's lack of success and departed before Fripp ever made this suggestion.

=== 1968–1969: Original line-up and In the Court of the Crimson King ===
The first incarnation of King Crimson – Fripp, Michael Giles, Lake, McDonald, and Sinfield – was formed on 30 November 1968 with rehearsals beginning on 13 January 1969. Sinfield coined the band's name in "a moment of pressured panic". Sinfield had already used the term "crimson king" in a set of lyrics before his involvement with Giles, Giles & Fripp. Sinfield insisted that the name did not refer to Beelzebub, prince of demons, and that a "crimson king" was any ruler during whose reign there were "societal rumblings" and "sort of the dark forces of the world". According to Fripp, King Crimson is a synonym for Beelzebub, which is an anglicised form of the Arabic phrase "B'il Sabab", meaning "the man with an aim", to which he related.

At this early point, McDonald was the primary composer, with vital contributions from Fripp and Lake, while Sinfield wrote all the lyrics on his own, and also designed and operated the band's unique stage lighting, being credited with "words and illumination" on the album sleeve. Inspired by the Moody Blues, McDonald suggested the group purchase a Mellotron keyboard, and this became a key component of the early Crimson sound. Sinfield described the original Crimson thus: "If it sounded at all popular, it was out. So it had to be complicated, it had to be more expansive chords, it had to have strange influences. If it sounded, like, too simple, we'd make it more complicated, we'd play it in 7/8 or 5/8, just to show off".

"The Court of the Crimson King" (1969)
37-second sample from King Crimson's "The Court of the Crimson King", demonstrating the sound of the first incarnation of the band, with its classically influenced style and use of the Mellotron instrument.

King Crimson's first live performance was at the Speakeasy Club in London on 9 April 1969 (with Yes guitarist Peter Banks and David Bowie among the audience). Their big breakthrough came on 5 July 1969 by playing as a support act at the Rolling Stones' free concert in Hyde Park, London, before an estimated 500,000 people.

The debut album, In the Court of the Crimson King, was released in October 1969 on Island Records. Fripp would later describe it as having been "an instant smash" and "New York's acid album of 1970" (notwithstanding Fripp and Giles's assertion that the band never used psychedelic drugs). The Who guitarist and composer Pete Townshend called the album "an uncanny masterpiece". The album contains Sinfield's gothic lyrics, and its sound was described as having "dark and doom-laden visions". Its opening track "21st Century Schizoid Man" has been described as "proto-metal" and the song's lyrics criticise the Vietnam War. In contrast to the blues-based hard rock of the contemporary British and American scenes, King Crimson presented a more Europeanised approach that blended antiquity and modernity. The band's music drew on a wide range of influences provided by all five group members. These elements included classical music, the psychedelic rock spearheaded by Jimi Hendrix, folk, jazz, military music (partially inspired by McDonald's stint as an army musician) and free improvisation.

After playing gigs across England, the band toured the United States with various pop and rock acts, their first show being at Goddard College in Plainfield, Vermont. While the band found success and critical acclaim, creative tensions were already developing. Giles and McDonald, still striving to cope with King Crimson's rapid success and the realities of touring life, became uneasy with their musical direction. Although he was neither the dominant composer nor the frontman, Fripp was very much the group's driving force and spokesman, leading them into progressively darker and more intense musical areas. McDonald and Giles, now favouring a lighter and more nuanced romantic style, became increasingly uncomfortable, and told Fripp they would be leaving the band upon the conclusion of the US tour. To keep the band together, Fripp offered to resign himself, but McDonald declared that King Crimson was "more (him) than them" and that he and Giles should therefore be the ones to leave. McDonald later said he "was probably not emotionally mature enough to handle it" and made a "rash decision to leave without consulting anyone". The original line-up played their last show at the Fillmore West in San Francisco on 14 December 1969, a little over one year after forming, with McDonald's and Giles's departures made official in January 1970. Live recordings of the band from 1969 were released in 1997 on Epitaph and in 2010 on the In the Court of the Crimson King (1969) box set. McDonald and Giles, as a spin-off duo from King Crimson, released a self-tiled album in 1971. Giles would go on to work as a session drummer, while McDonald would co-form Foreigner in 1976.

=== 1970: In the Wake of Poseidon and Lizard ===
King Crimson spent 1970 in a state of flux with various line-up changes, thwarted tour plans, and difficulties in finding a satisfactory musical direction, while Fripp was learning and developing as a songwriter during the writing process of the next three albums. As well as guitar, Fripp took on keyboard duties, while Sinfield expanded his creative role to operating synthesizers.

Following McDonald's and Giles's departure, Lake, unsure of the band's future without them, began discussions with Keith Emerson of the Nice about possibly forming a new band together. With Fripp and Sinfield planning the recording of the second King Crimson album, and Lake's position uncertain, the band's management booked Elton John to sing on the album, a decision cancelled by Fripp after he listened to John's then-only album, Empty Sky, and deemed his singing style to be not right for King Crimson. Lake agreed to stay with the band until Emerson had completed remaining commitments with the Nice, at which point he left to form Emerson, Lake & Palmer with Emerson and Carl Palmer of Atomic Rooster. On the resulting In the Wake of Poseidon album, Lake provided all the lead vocals except on "Cadence and Cascade", which featured Fripp's old school friend Gordon Haskell. The sessions also included Michael and Peter Giles on drums and bass respectively, saxophonist Mel Collins (formerly of the band Circus), and jazz pianist Keith Tippett.

Upon its release in May 1970, In the Wake of Poseidon reached No. 4 in the UK and No. 31 in the US. It received some criticism from those who thought it sounded too similar to their first album. With no set band to perform the new material, Fripp and Sinfield brought Mel Collins and Gordon Haskell in as full-time members, with Haskell doubling as lead vocalist and bassist and Collins playing woodwinds and keyboards, while Andy McCulloch joined as the band's new drummer.

Fripp and Sinfield wrote the band's third album, Lizard, with Haskell, Collins, and McCulloch having no say in the direction of the material. In addition to the core band, several session musicians contributed to the Lizard recording, including the returning Keith Tippett, who was offered to be a member of the new line-up, but due to other commitments could only work with the band as an occasional guest musician, and two members of Tippett's band, Mark Charig on cornet and Nick Evans on trombone. Oboe and cor anglais player Robin Miller also appeared, while Jon Anderson of Yes was brought in to sing a section of the album's title track, "Prince Rupert Awakes", which Fripp and Sinfield considered to be outside Haskell's natural range and style. Lizard featured stronger jazz and chamber-classical influences than previous albums. The album contains Sinfield's "phantasmagorical" lyrics, including "Happy Family" (an allegory of the break-up of the Beatles), and the title track, a suite which took up the entire second side, describing a medieval battle and its outcome.

Released in December 1970, Lizard reached No. 29 in the UK and No. 113 in the US. Described retrospectively as an "outlier", the album had been made by a group in disagreement over method and taste. The more rhythm-and-blues-oriented Haskell and McCulloch both found the music difficult to relate to, and tedious and confusing to record. Collins disliked how his parts were composed, while both Fripp and Haskell detested Sinfield's lyrics. This line-up of the band did not survive much longer than the Lizard recording sessions. Haskell quit the band acrimoniously during initial tour rehearsals, after refusing to sing live with distortion and electronic effects on his voice, and McCulloch departed soon after. With Sinfield not being a musician and Fripp having seemingly given up on the band, Collins was left to search for new members.

=== 1971–1972: Islands ===
After a search for a drummer to replace McCulloch, Ian Wallace was secured. Fripp was re-energised by the addition of a new member, and he joined Collins and Wallace to audition singers and bassists. Singers who tried out included Bryan Ferry of Roxy Music (Sinfield would produce Roxy Music's first album in 1972) and even one of the band's managers, John Gaydon. The position eventually went to Raymond "Boz" Burrell. John Wetton was invited to join on bass, but declined in order to join Family instead. Rick Kemp (later of Steeleye Span) rehearsed with the band, but declined the final offer to formally join. Fripp decided to teach Burrell to play bass rather than continue the labored auditions. Though he had not played bass before, Burrell had played enough acoustic guitar to assist him in learning the instrument quickly. Wallace was able to further instruct Burrell in functioning on the instrument in a rhythm section.

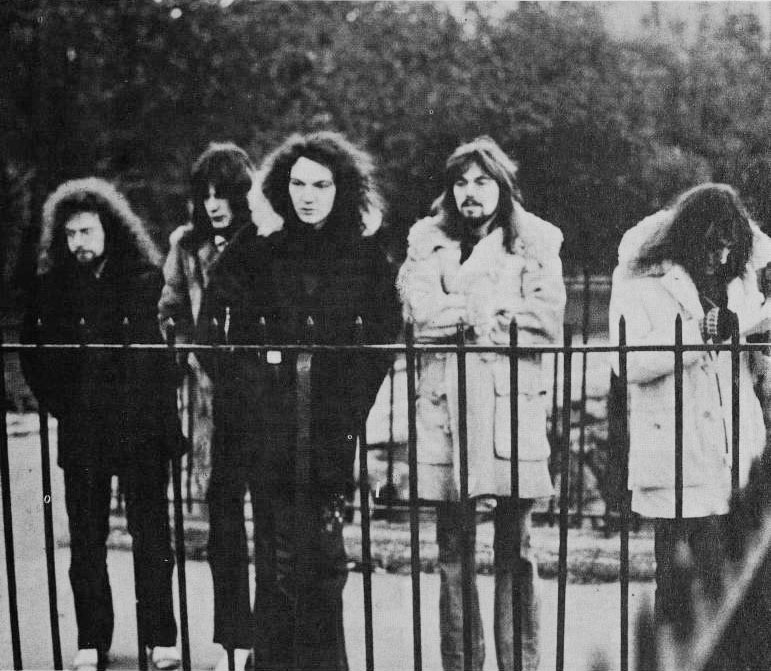
King Crimson in 1971. From left: Robert Fripp, Mel Collins, Ian Wallace, Boz Burrell, and Peter Sinfield

With a line-up now complete, King Crimson began touring in May 1971, the first time they had played live since the original line-up's last show on 14 December 1969. The concerts were well received, but musical differences and the somewhat wilder lifestyles of Collins, Wallace, and Burrell alienated the non-drug-taking Fripp, who began to withdraw socially from his bandmates, creating further tension.

In 1971, the new King Crimson formation recorded Islands. Sinfield, who now favoured a softer approach, took lyrical inspiration from Homer's Odyssey, musical inspiration from jazz players like Miles Davis and Ahmad Jamal, and a trip to the Balearic Islands. Islands featured the instrumental "Sailor's Tale", with a droning Mellotron and Fripp's banjo-inspired guitar solo; the raunchy blues-rocker "Ladies of the Road", a tribute to groupies that featured Wallace and Collins singing Beatlesque backing vocals; and "Song of the Gulls", which was developed from the instrumental "Suite No. 1" from Giles, Giles & Fripp's 1968 album and would be the only time the band would utilize an orchestra. Burrell disliked Sinfield's lyrics, and one of the band members allegedly called Islands "an airy-fairy piece of shit".

Released in December 1971, Islands charted at No. 30 in the UK and No. 76 in the US. That same month, the band undertook a short tour of the United States, after which Fripp informed Sinfield that he could no longer work with him and asked him to leave King Crimson. In January 1972, the remaining four members broke up acrimoniously in rehearsals, owing partially to Fripp's refusal to play a composition by Collins. He later cited this as "quality control", with the idea that King Crimson would perform the "right" kind of music.

In order to fulfill touring contracts in the United States in 1972, Fripp, Collins, Burrell, and Wallace reformed with the intention of disbanding immediately after the tour. Recordings from various North American dates during January and February 1972 were released as Earthbound in June of that year. The album was noted for its performance style, that occasionally veered towards funk, and for Burrell's scat singing on the improvised pieces, but was criticised for its poor sound quality. Better-quality live recordings from this era would be released in 2002 as Ladies of the Road and in 2017 on the Sailors' Tales (1970–1972) box set.

By this time the musical rift between Fripp and the rest of the band had grown very wide. Wallace, Burrell, and Collins favoured improvised blues- and funk-influenced music; Fripp would later describe the 1971–1972 line-up as more of a jam band than an "improvising" band, an opinion with which Wallace disagreed. Personal relations, however, improved during the tour to the point where most of the band wanted to continue; nonetheless, Fripp opted to part company with the other three and reconstitute King Crimson with new musicians, as he felt the other members would not fully engage with the musical direction he now had in mind. Collins went on to join Camel, Burrell co-formed Bad Company, and Wallace became a session musician, most notably playing on several Bob Dylan albums and the Traveling Wilburys' first album.

=== 1972–1975: Larks' Tongues in Aspic, Starless and Bible Black, Red and hiatus ===
"It was going to be an interesting ride when ... I wasn't given a setlist when I joined the band, more a reading list. Ouspensky, J. G. Bennett, Gurdjieff and Castaneda were all hot. Wicca, personality changes, low-level magic, pyromancy – all this from the magus in the court of the Crimson King. This was going to be more than three chords and a pint of Guinness."

— Bill Bruford.

The next incarnation of King Crimson was radically different from the previous configurations. Fripp's four new recruits were free-improvising percussionist Jamie Muir; drummer Bill Bruford, who had left Yes at a critical and commercial peak in their career in favour of the "darker" Crimson; bassist and vocalist John Wetton, who left Family; and violinist, keyboardist and flautist David Cross, whom Fripp had met when he was invited to a rehearsal of Waves, a band Cross was working in.

Fripp and Wetton were this incarnation's primary composers, each writing segments independently and fitting together those which they found compatible. With Sinfield gone, the band asked Wetton's friend Richard Palmer-James, formerly of Supertramp, to be their new lyricist. Unlike Sinfield, Palmer-James was not an official member of King Crimson, having no involvement with the band other than writing lyrics, which he would mail to them from his home in Germany. Following a period of rehearsals, King Crimson resumed touring on 13 October 1972 at the Zoom Club in Frankfurt, with the band's penchant for improvisation and Muir's startling stage presence gaining them renewed press attention.

"Larks' Tongues in Aspic, Part One" (1973)
An excerpt of "Larks' Tongues in Aspic, Part One", demonstrating the heavy metal influences, complex structure of the music, improvisation, and the percussion of Jamie Muir.

In January and February 1973, King Crimson recorded Larks' Tongues in Aspic in London; the album was released that March. The band's new sound was exemplified by the album's two-part title track, which emphasised the sharp instrumental interplay of the band and drew influence from modernist classical music, noisy free improvisation, and heavy metal. The record displayed Muir's unusual approach to percussion, which included a self-modified drum kit, assorted toys, a bullroarer, mbira, gongs, balloons, a thunder sheet and chains. On stage, Muir also employed unpredictable, manic movements, bizarre clothing, and fake blood capsules which he occasionally spit or applied to the head; this was the sole example of such on-stage theatrics in the band's long history. The album reached No. 20 in the UK and No. 61 in the US.

After a period of further touring, Muir departed in 1973, quitting the music industry altogether. Muir told King Crimson's management that a musician's life was not for him, and he had chosen to join a Scottish Buddhist monastery. He offered to serve a period of notice which the management declined. Instead of giving the real reason for Muir's departure, the management informed the rest of the band and the public that Muir had sustained an onstage injury caused by a gong landing on his foot.

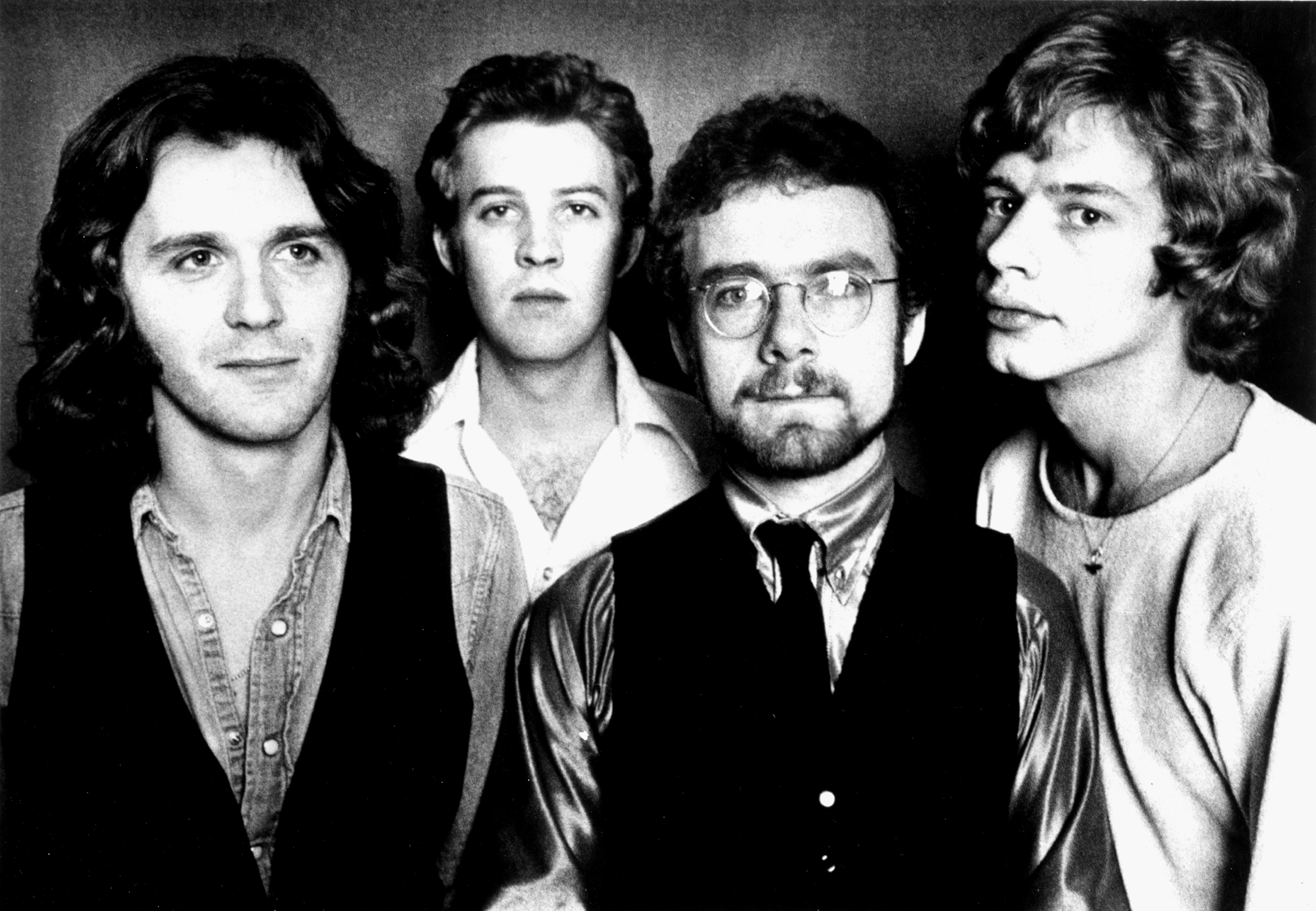
King Crimson in 1974. From left: John Wetton, David Cross, Robert Fripp, and Bill Bruford

With Muir gone, the remaining members continued as a four-piece, releasing Starless and Bible Black in March 1974. Earning a positive Rolling Stone review, most of the album was recorded live during the band's late 1973 tour, with the recordings carefully edited and overdubbed to sound like studio recordings, while "The Great Deceiver", "Lament" and the second half of "The Night Watch" were recorded entirely in the studio. The album reached No. 28 in the UK and No. 64 in the US.

Following the album's release, the band began to divide once more, this time over performance. Musically, Fripp found himself positioned between Bruford and Wetton, who played with such force and increasing volume that Fripp once compared them to "a flying brick wall", and Cross, whose amplified acoustic violin was consistently drowned out by the rhythm section, leading him to concentrate more on keyboards. An increasingly frustrated Cross began to withdraw both musically and personally, with the result being that he was voted out of the group following the band's 1974 tour. Wilfred Gibson (who'd played uncredited violin on Islands and worked with Fripp on the Centipede project) was approached to replace Cross, but declined.

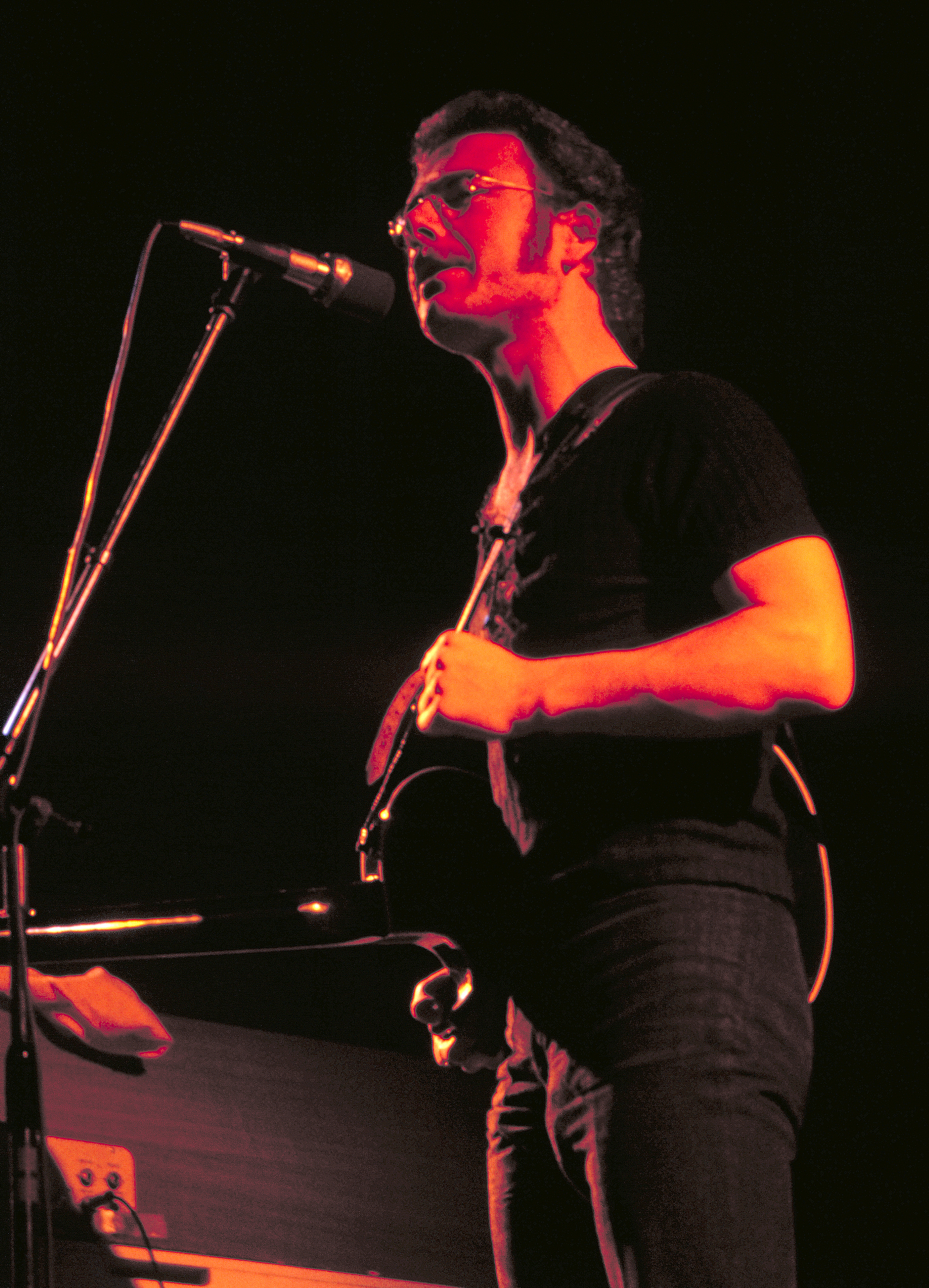
Fripp performing at the Auditorium Theatre, Chicago, 25 April 1974

In July 1974, Fripp, Bruford, and Wetton began recording Red. Before recording began, Fripp, now increasingly disillusioned with the music industry, turned his attention to the works of English mystic John G. Bennett and had a spiritual experience in which "the top of my head blew off". Most of the album had been developed during live improvisations before Fripp "withdrew his opinion", leaving his bandmates to direct the sessions. The album contains one live track, "Providence", recorded on 30 June 1974 in Providence, Rhode Island with Cross on violin. Several guest musicians, including former members Ian McDonald and Mel Collins on saxophones, contributed to the album. Released on 6 October 1974, Red went to No. 45 in the UK and No. 66 in the US. AllMusic later called it "an impressive achievement" for a group about to disband, with "intensely dynamic" musical chemistry between the band members.

Two months before the release of Red, King Crimson's future looked bright, with talks regarding the possibility of McDonald rejoining the group. However, Fripp wished not to tour as he felt increasingly disenchanted by the group and the music industry. He also felt the world was going to drastically change by 1981 and that he had to prepare for it. Despite a band meeting while touring the US in which Fripp expressed a desire to end the band, the group did not formally disband until 25 September 1974; the following month Fripp announced in an interview with Trouser Press magazine that King Crimson had "ceased to exist" and was "completely over for ever and ever". It was later revealed that Fripp had attempted to replace himself with McDonald and Steve Hackett of Genesis, but this was rejected by the managers.

Following the band's disbandment, the live album USA was released in May 1975, formed of recordings from their 1974 North American tour. It received some positive reviews, including being deemed "a must" for fans of the band and "insanity you're better off having". Issues with the tapes rendered some of Cross's playing inaudible, so Eddie Jobson of Roxy Music was hired to perform violin and keyboard overdubs; further edits were also made to allow the music to fit on a single LP. More live recordings from the 1972–1974 era would be issued as The Night Watch in 1997, and as part of the box sets The Great Deceiver (1992), Larks' Tongues in Aspic (1972–1973) (2012), The Road to Red (1974), and Starless (1973–1974) (both 2014). After short stints with Roxy Music and Uriah Heep, Wetton went on to co-form U.K. with Bruford in 1977, and Asia in 1981; Bruford, in addition to U.K., formed the jazz fusion band Bruford. From 1975 to 1980, King Crimson were completely inactive.

=== 1981–1984: Discipline, Beat, Three of a Perfect Pair and second hiatus ===
For legal reasons, all reissues of Discipline since 2001 feature this knotwork design by Steve Ball (which has been the official logo of DGM since 1992), replacing the John Kyrk knotwork design of the original 1981 release

In the late autumn of 1980, having spent several years on spiritual pursuits and then gradually returning to music (including playing guitar for David Bowie, Brian Eno, Peter Gabriel and Daryl Hall; pursuing an experimental solo career; and leading the instrumental new wave band The League of Gentlemen), Fripp decided to form a new "first division" rock group.

Having recruited Bruford as drummer, Fripp then asked the American singer and guitarist Adrian Belew, who had previously played with Bowie and Frank Zappa, to join; this was the first time Fripp would actively seek collaboration with another guitarist in a band, and therefore indicative of his desire to create something unlike any of his previous work. After touring with Talking Heads, Belew agreed to join and also become the band's lyricist. Bruford's suggestion of bassist Jeff Berlin was rejected as Fripp thought his playing was "too busy", so auditions were held in New York; on the third day, Fripp left after roughly three auditions, only to return several hours later with session bassist Tony Levin (who got the job after playing a single chorus of "Red"). Fripp later confessed that, had he known that Levin (whom Fripp had played with in Peter Gabriel's group) was available and interested, he would have selected him without holding auditions. Fripp named the new quartet Discipline, and they went to England to rehearse and write new material. They made their live debut at Moles Club in Bath, Somerset on 30 April 1981, and completed a short UK tour supported by the Lounge Lizards. By October 1981, the band had opted to change their name to King Crimson.

"The Sheltering Sky" (1981)
An excerpt of "The Sheltering Sky" (1981), showing gamelan influences, Bruford's use of an African slit drum, and Fripp and Belew's use of a guitar synthesiser, a staple of much of their 1980s albums.

Fripp intended to create the sound of a "rock gamelan", with an interlocking rhythmic quality to the paired guitars that he found similar to Indonesian gamelan ensembles. In 1981, King Crimson recorded Discipline in London with producer Rhett Davies, who had previously worked with Belew on Talking Heads' Remain in Light and with Fripp on Eno's Another Green World and Before and After Science. The album displayed a very different version of the band, with newer influences including post-punk, new wave, funk, minimalism, pointillism, world music and African percussion, and a sound described in The New Rolling Stone Album Guide as having a "jaw-dropping technique" of "knottily rhythmic, harmonically demanding workouts". The title track was described as a postminimalist rock song. Fripp concentrated on playing complex picked arpeggios, while Belew provided an arsenal of guitar sounds that "often mimic animal noises"; both also experimented with guitar synthesisers. In addition to bass guitar, Levin used the Chapman Stick, a ten-string hybrid guitar and bass instrument played by two-handed tapping, in an "utterly original style". Bruford experimented with Simmons SDSV electronic drums and largely eschewed cymbals. The band's songs were shorter in comparison to previous King Crimson albums, shaped by Belew's pop sensibilities and quirky approach to writing lyrics. Though the band's previous taste for improvisation was now tightly reined in, one instrumental ("The Sheltering Sky") emerged from group rehearsals, while the noisy, half-spoken/half-shouted "Indiscipline" was a part-written, part-improvised piece created in order to give Bruford a chance to escape from the strict rhythmic demands of the rest of the album. Released in September 1981, Discipline reached No. 41 in the UK and No. 45 in the US.

In June 1982, King Crimson followed Discipline with Beat, the first King Crimson album recorded with the same line-up as the album preceding it. Beat was also the group's only album where Fripp had no involvement in the original mixing, with Davies and Belew undertaking production duties. The album was themed around the lives and works of Beat Generation writers, reflected in song titles such as "Neal and Jack and Me" (inspired by Neal Cassady and Jack Kerouac), "Heartbeat" (inspired by Carolyn Cassady's memoir Heart Beat: My Life with Jack and Neal), "The Howler" (inspired by Allen Ginsberg's "Howl") and "Waiting Man" (inspired by William S. Burroughs). The album contained themes of life on the road, existential angst and romanticism. While Beat was more pop-influenced than Discipline, it also featured the improvised "Requiem", which featured Frippertronics, a guitar technique invented by Eno and Fripp using a tape loop system.

The recording of Beat was marred by tension within the band, with Belew suffering stress over his duties as frontman, lead singer, and principal songwriter. On one occasion, he clashed with Fripp and ordered him out of the studio. As Beat reached No. 39 in the UK and No. 52 in the US, King Crimson resumed touring. "Heartbeat" was released as a single (paired with the band's first music video), which peaked at No. 57 on the Billboard Mainstream Rock chart. Around this time the band released the VHS The Noise: Live in Frejus, a document of a show played at the Arena in Fréjus, France on 27 August 1982, co-headlining with Roxy Music (whose set from the same show was also released on VHS as The High Road). This footage was later re-released as part of the Neal and Jack and Me DVD in 2004.

King Crimson's next album, Three of a Perfect Pair, was recorded in 1983 in the UK and US and released in March 1984. Having encountered difficulty in both writing and determining a direction for the album, the band chose to record and call the album's first half a "left side" – four pop-oriented songs and an instrumental – and the second, mostly-instrumental half a "right side" which contained more experimental work, improvisations that drew influence from industrial music and a third movement of "Larks' Tongues in Aspic". Stress during the writing process and the tension between the band members manifested in both lyrical content and music. The 2001 remaster of the album included an "other side", a collection of remixes and improvisational out-takes plus Levin's humorous song, "The King Crimson Barbershop". Three of a Perfect Pair peaked at No. 30 in the UK and No. 58 in the US, with the title track and "Sleepless" being released as singles. The live video Three of a Perfect Pair: Live in Japan was released later in 1984 on VHS (and later also included on the Neal and Jack and Me DVD). The last concert of the Three of a Perfect Pair tour, at the Spectrum in Montreal on 11 July 1984, was recorded and released in 1998 as Absent Lovers: Live in Montreal. Further live recordings of the 1980s band would be released in 2016 as part of the On (and off) The Road (1981–1984) box set. Despite their conflict, the musicians remained professional on stage.

"Robert broke up the group, again, for the umpteenth time, dwelling at length, I suppose, on our lack of imagination, ability, direction and a thousand other things we were doubtless missing. I suppose this only because I remember not listening to this litany of failures. Might as well quit while you're ahead, I thought."

— Bill Bruford on the band's 1984 disbanding.

Following the 1984 tour, Fripp dissolved King Crimson for the second time, exactly ten years after the band's 1974 split. Bruford and Belew expressed frustration over this; Belew recalled the first he had heard of it was through a report in Musician magazine.

=== 1994–1999: The Double Trio, Vrooom, Thrak and the ProjeKcts ===
In the summer of 1991, Belew met with Fripp in England to express an interest in reviving King Crimson. That year saw the release of the retrospective box set Frame by Frame: The Essential King Crimson. A follow-up box set, The Great Deceiver, appeared the following year as the first release on Fripp's newly-established record label Discipline Global Mobile (DGM), formed with producer David Singleton. Subsequently, DGM would be the primary home for Fripp's work, with larger album releases distributed to bigger record companies (initially Virgin Records), and smaller releases handled by DGM. This afforded Fripp and his associates greater creative freedom and more control over all aspects of their work.

Drummer/percussionist Pat Mastelotto joined the band as part of the "Double Trio" line-up, alongside Trey Gunn.

In late 1991, Fripp asked former Japan singer David Sylvian to join a new King Crimson line-up. Sylvian declined the offer, but agreed to work with Fripp on a collaborative album; the resulting album The First Day was issued in 1993 under the name Sylvian/Fripp. In June 1993, Fripp began to assemble a larger version of King Crimson featuring Belew and Levin, Chapman Stick player Trey Gunn (a veteran of Fripp's Guitar Craft courses and a session musician on The First Day) and drummer Jerry Marotta, with whom Fripp and Levin had played in Peter Gabriel's band. After Sylvian/Fripp's closing concerts at the Royal Albert Hall in December 1993, Fripp decided to ask the tour's drummer Pat Mastelotto, formerly of Mr. Mister, to join instead of Marotta. Bruford would become the last member of the 1980s quartet to return to the band. Bruford later said he had lobbied Fripp at the last minute because he believed that Crimson was still very much "his gig", and that Fripp had come up with a philosophical explanation for utilizing both Mastelotto and Bruford later. One of the conditions Fripp imposed upon Bruford if he were to return was to give up all creative control to Fripp. Fripp later explained that he had a vision of a "Double Trio" with two guitarists, two bassists, and two drummers while driving along the Chalke Valley in Wiltshire one afternoon in 1992.

Following rehearsals in Woodstock, New York, the group released the EP Vrooom in October 1994. This revealed the new King Crimson sound, which featured the interlocking guitars of the 1980s mixed with the layered, heavier feel of the 1973–74 line-up. There was also a vague influence from the industrial music of that time. Many of the songs were written or finalised by Belew, and displayed stronger elements of 1960s pop than before; in particular, a Beatles influence. Bruford would refer to this line-up as sounding like "a dissonant Shadows on steroids". As with previous line-ups, new technology was utilised, including MIDI (which Belew and Gunn used to control guitar synthesisers and Fripp used to replace Frippertronics with "Soundscapes") and the Warr Guitar with which Gunn replaced his Chapman Stick in 1995. The double trio began touring on 28 September 1994 in Buenos Aires, Argentina; portions of these concerts were released on the double live CD set B'Boom: Live in Argentina in 1995.

"The meaning of THRAK ... the first one is: a sudden and precise impact moving from direction and commitment in service of an aim ... The second definition is: 117 guitars almost hitting the same chord simultaneously. So, the album THRAK, what is it? 56 minutes and 37 seconds of songs and music about love, dying, redemption and mature guys who get erections."

— Robert Fripp's press release for Thrak and the sleeve notes to Vrooom Vrooom

In October and December 1994, King Crimson recorded their eleventh studio album, Thrak, at Peter Gabriel's Real World Studios. Containing revised versions of the songs from Vrooom, plus some new tracks, the album was described by Q magazine as having "jazz-scented rock structures, characterised by noisy, angular, exquisite guitar interplay" and an "athletic, ever-inventive rhythm section", while being in tune with the sound of alternative rock of the mid-1990s. Examples of the band's efforts to integrate their multiple elements could be heard on the accessible (but complex) songs "Dinosaur" and "Sex Sleep Eat Drink Dream", the more straightforward ballad "One Time", as well as "Radio I" and "Radio II"- a pair of Fripp's Soundscapes instrumentals.

King Crimson resumed touring in 1995 and into 1996. Dates from October and November 1995 were recorded and released on the live album Thrakattak in May 1996, which is an hour of improvised music integrating sections from performances of Thrak's title track in the United States and Japan as mixed and arranged into a single work by David Singleton. A more conventional live recording from the period was later made available as the double CD release Vrooom Vrooom (2001), while a full 1995 concert was released on VHS in 1996 as Live in Japan and re-released on DVD in 1999 as Déjà Vrooom. The double trio would be further honoured by the Thrak (1994–1997) box set in 2015.

The band began rehearsing again in May 1997 in Nashville, Tennessee. Fripp was dissatisfied with the quality of the new music being developed by the band, and longstanding friction between himself and Bruford resurfaced. The resulting atmosphere and the lack of workable material almost broke the band up altogether. Instead, the six members opted to work in four smaller groups (or "fraKctalisations", as Fripp called them) known as ProjeKcts. This enabled the group to continue developing ideas and searching for a new direction without the practical difficulty and expense of convening all six musicians at once. From late 1997 to early 1999, ProjeKct One (Fripp, Bruford, Levin, Gunn), ProjeKct Two (Fripp, Belew, Gunn), ProjeKct Three (Fripp, Gunn, Mastelotto), and ProjeKct Four (Fripp, Levin, Gunn, Mastelotto) played live in the United States and the United Kingdom, with recordings from these performances released on The ProjeKcts box set in 1999. These largely-improvised recordings, along with ProjeKct Two's 1998 studio album Space Groove, showed influences including jazz, industrial, techno and drum and bass. Music critic J. D. Considine considered the ProjeKcts' work "frequently astonishing" but lacking in melody. The four live performances of ProjeKct One in December 1997 would be Bruford's last involvement with King Crimson.

=== 1999–2003: The Double Duo, The ConstruKction of Light and The Power to Believe ===
King Crimson reconvened in 1999. With Levin busy with session work, and believing Bruford to be more concerned with his jazz band Earthworks than Crimson, Fripp decided the next phase of King Crimson would be a "Double Duo" of himself, Belew, Gunn, and Mastelotto. This line-up recorded The ConstruKction of Light at Belew's home studio in Mount Juliet, Tennessee. Fripp was inspired by Tool's album Undertow during the writing process of The ConstruKction of Light. Released in May 2000, the album reached No. 129 in the UK. Most of the pieces were metallic, harsh and industrial metal–influenced, featuring Mastelotto performing exclusively on electronic drums, Gunn taking over the bass role on Warr Guitar, and a different take on the interlocking guitars of the 1980s quartet. With the exception of an "industrial blues" sung by Belew through a voice changer (under the pseudonym of "Hooter J. Johnson"), the songs were dense and complex. The album also contained the fourth installment of "Larks' Tongues in Aspic". It received a negative reception for lacking new ideas. At the same time as recording The ConstruKction of Light, the band also recorded an album of improvised instrumentals, Heaven and Earth, released under the name ProjeKct X.

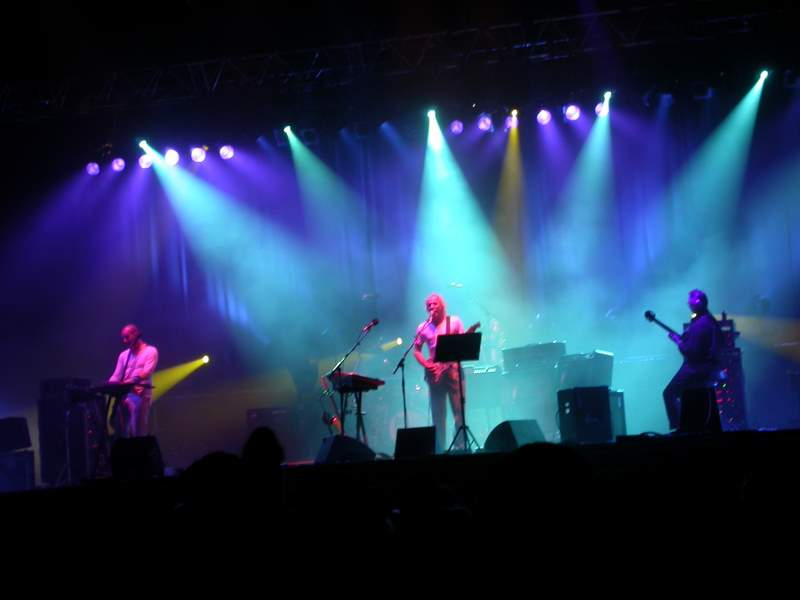
The band performing in 2003. Left to right: Trey Gunn, Adrian Belew, and Robert Fripp (Pat Mastelotto is hidden)

King Crimson toured to support both albums, including double bill shows with Tool. The tour was documented on the live album Heavy ConstruKction in 2000 and the Heaven & Earth (1997–2008) box set in 2019. Led Zeppelin bassist John Paul Jones and his band supported Crimson on some live shows.

On 9 November 2001, King Crimson released a limited edition live EP called Level Five, featuring three new pieces: "Dangerous Curves", "Level Five" and "Virtuous Circle", plus versions of "The ConstruKction of Light" and ProjeKct's "The Deception of the Thrush", followed by an unlisted track called "ProjeKct 12th and X" after one minute of silence. A second EP followed in October 2002, Happy with What You Have to Be Happy With. This featured eleven tracks (including a live version of "Larks' Tongues in Aspic, Part IV"). Half of the tracks were processed vocal snippets by Belew, and the songs themselves varied between Soundscapes, gamelan, heavy metal and blues.

The double duo line-up released King Crimson's thirteenth album, The Power to Believe, in March 2003. Fripp described it as "the culmination of three years of Crimsonising". The album incorporated, reworked and retitled versions of "Deception of the Thrush" ("The Power to Believe III"), tracks from their previous two EPs, and an extract from a Fripp Soundscape with added instrumentation and vocals, alongside "Level Five" (the final installment of the "Larks' Tongues in Aspic" suite). The Power to Believe reached No. 162 in the UK and No. 150 in the US. King Crimson toured in 2003 to support the album; recordings from it were used for the live album EleKtrik: Live in Japan. 2003 also saw the release of the DVD Eyes Wide Open, a compilation of the band's shows Live at the Shepherds Bush Empire (London, 3 July 2000) and Live in Japan (Tokyo, 16 April 2003).

In November 2003, Gunn left the group to pursue solo projects and was replaced by Levin. The band reconvened in early 2004 for rehearsals, but nothing developed from these sessions; they then went on another hiatus. At this point, Fripp was publicly reassessing his desire to work within the music industry, often citing the unsympathetic aspects of the life of a touring musician, such as "the illusion of intimacy with celebrities". Two retrospective box sets, The 21st Century Guide to King Crimson Volume One 1969–1974 and The 21st Century Guide to King Crimson Volume Two 1981–2003, were issued in 2004 and 2005 respectively.

On 21 September 2006, former King Crimson member Boz Burrell died of a heart attack, followed by another former member, Ian Wallace, who died of esophageal cancer on 22 February 2007.

=== 2008: 40th Anniversary tour and third hiatus ===
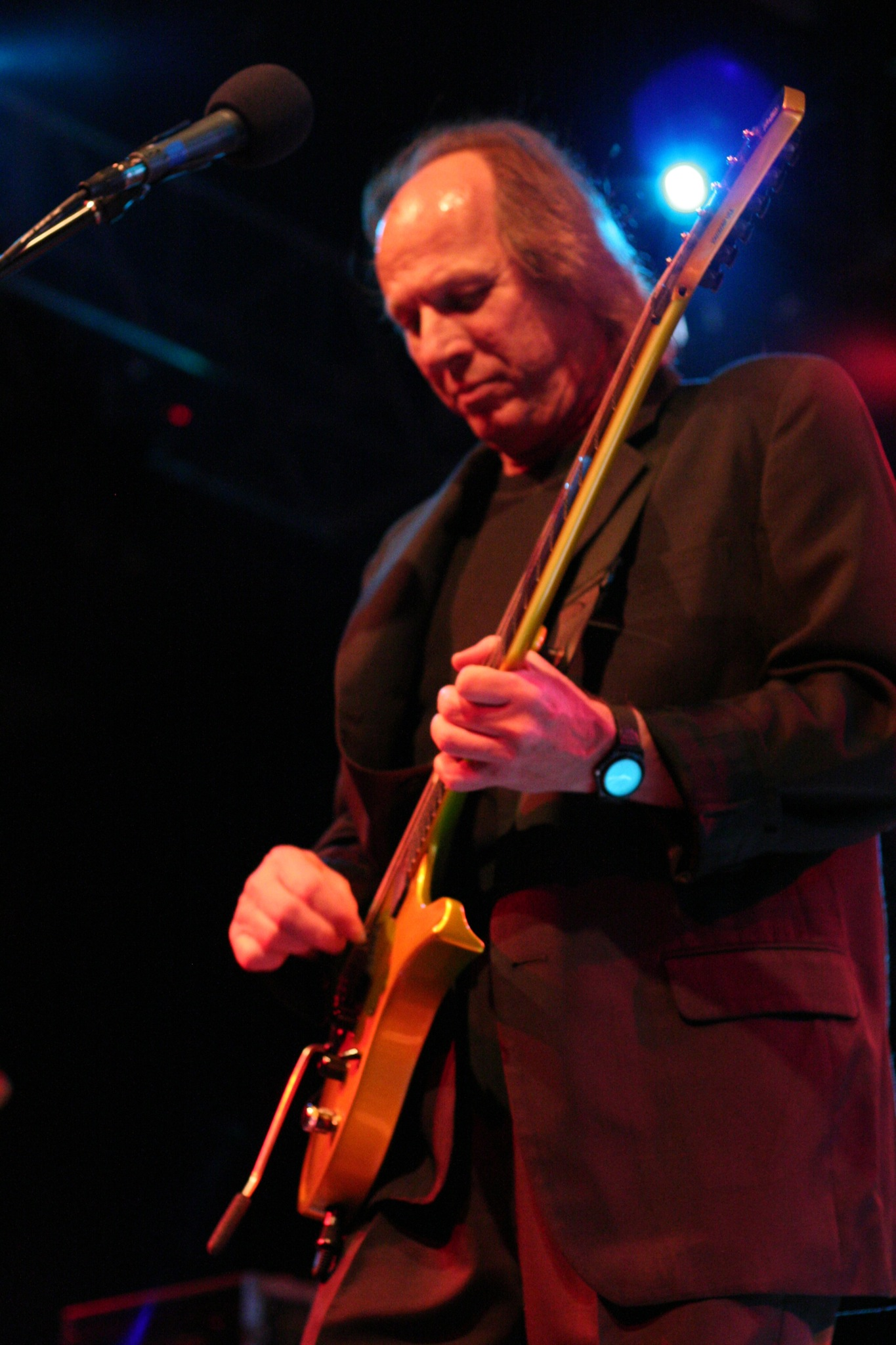
Adrian Belew performing in 2006

A new King Crimson formation was announced in 2007: Fripp, Belew, Levin, Mastelotto, and a new second drummer, Gavin Harrison of Porcupine Tree. In August 2008, after a period of rehearsals, the five completed the band's 40th Anniversary Tour. The setlists featured no new material, drawing instead from the existing Larks' Tongues-era/Discipline-era/Double Trio/Double Duo repertoire. Additional shows were planned for 2009, but were cancelled due to scheduling clashes with Belew.

King Crimson began another hiatus after the 40th Anniversary Tour. Belew continued to lobby for reviving the band, and discussed it with Fripp several times in 2009 and 2010. Among Belew's suggestions was a temporary reunion of the 1980s line-up for a thirtieth anniversary tour: an idea declined by both Fripp and Bruford, the latter commenting "I would be highly unlikely to try to recreate the same thing, a mission I fear destined to failure." In December 2010, Fripp wrote that the King Crimson "switch" had been set to "off" since October 2008, citing several reasons for this decision.

In August 2012, Fripp announced his planned retirement from the music industry, leaving the future of King Crimson uncertain.

=== 2014–2021: The Seven-Headed Beast and Three Over Five line-ups ===
Prior to Fripp's retirement announcement, a band called Jakszyk, Fripp and Collins (subtitled "A King Crimson ProjeKct") had released an album called A Scarcity of Miracles in 2011. The band featured guitarist and singer Jakko Jakszyk (who had previously performed King Crimson material alongside former members with 21st Century Schizoid Band), Fripp and Mel Collins, with Tony Levin playing bass and Stick and Gavin Harrison drumming. At one point, Fripp referred to the band as "P7" (ProjeKct Seven). Unusually for a ProjeKct, it was based around "finely crafted" and "mid-paced" original songs derived from improvised sessions.

In September 2013, Fripp announced King Crimson's return to activity with a "very different reformation to what has gone before: seven players, four English and three American, with three drummers". He cited several reasons to make a comeback, varying from the practical to the whimsical: "I was becoming too happy. Time for a pointed stick." The new line-up drew from both the previous line-up (retaining Fripp, Levin, Harrison and Mastelotto) and the Scarcity of Miracles project (Jakszyk and Collins), with Guitar Craft alumnus and former R.E.M./Ministry drummer Bill Rieflin as the seventh member. Belew was not asked to take part, thus ending his 32-year tenure in King Crimson. This version of the group took on the nickname of "the Seven-Headed Beast".

This drastically revamped King Crimson had no plans to record in the studio, focusing instead on playing "reconfigured" versions of past material live. According to Levin, the band "were instructed/advised by Robert Fripp to look at the older classic King Crimson material as if we had written it. And so we did that with a lot of older material that the band had done before the '80s. We didn't actually cover that much of the '80s material outside of a few songs."

For the most part, this approach would remain consistent for the remainder of the band's lifetime. In early 2014, the band's repertoire included songs from the run of albums between In the Court of the Crimson King and Larks' Tongues in Aspic for the first time since 1974, as well as reviving song material from Red. No songs with vocals by Belew were included in the setlist, although some instrumentals from his tenure were played. Some material from A Scarcity of Miracles was also incorporated into the band's repertoire.

After rehearsing in England, King Crimson toured North America from 9 September to 6 October. Recordings from the Los Angeles dates were released as Live at the Orpheum; this included the newly-written instrumentals "Banshee Legs Bell Hassle" and "Walk On: Monk Morph Chamber Music".

Tours of Europe, Canada, and Japan followed in the later half of 2015. Brand-new songs mainly written by Fripp and Jakszyk were debuted at the concerts, as well as drum showcases. A live recording from the Canadian leg of the tour was released at the end of February 2016 as Live In Toronto, which included the new songs "Radical Action (To Unseat the Hold of Monkey Mind)" and "Meltdown". A European tour was planned for 2016. Following Rieflin's decision to take a break from music, drummer Jeremy Stacey of Noel Gallagher's High Flying Birds was called in place for dates from September.

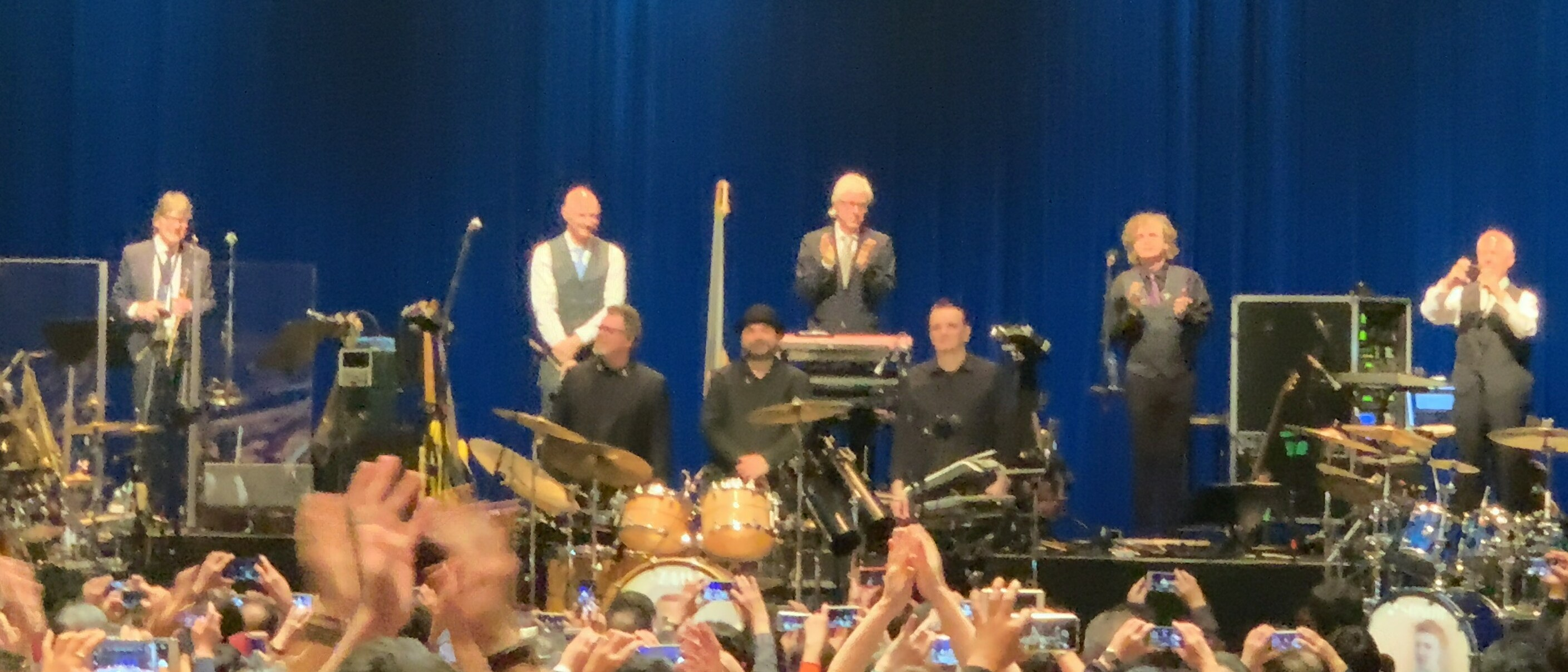
The band with its "Three Over Five" line-up following a show in Takamatsu, Japan on 7 December 2018. Top from left: Mel Collins, Tony Levin, Bill Rieflin, Jakko Jakszyk, Robert Fripp. Bottom from left: Pat Mastelotto, Jeremy Stacey, Gavin Harrison

The live album Radical Action to Unseat the Hold of Monkey Mind, was released in September 2016, drawing from 2015 concert dates of Japan, Canada and France featuring Rieflin. A 4-disc set aimed at documenting the band's ever-evolving live setlist, it included one performance of every song the band presented onstage during the tour and concert footage mostly recorded in Takamatsu, Japan, on 19 December 2015.

On 7 December 2016, founding King Crimson member Greg Lake died of cancer. Another former King Crimson member, John Wetton, died of colon cancer on 31 January 2017.

On 3 January 2017, Rieflin returned to King Crimson. Since the band also wished to retain Stacey, King Crimson became an octet, which Fripp initially referred to as the "Double Quartet Formation". Rieflin later eschewed drumming with the group and became King Crimson's first full-time keyboardist, with Fripp rechristening the line-up the "Three Over Five" (or "Five Over Three") formation.

On 2 June 2017, King Crimson released a new live EP named Heroes, featuring a cover of the David Bowie song of the same name. The EP was intended as a tribute to Bowie, for whom Fripp had provided distinctive guitar work on the albums "Heroes" (1977) and Scary Monsters (and Super Creeps) (1980). The video for King Crimson's version of "Heroes" won "Video of the Year" at the 2017 Progressive Music Awards. Shortly afterwards, King Crimson embarked on the first leg of a North American tour, from 11 June until 19 July. On 3 September, Robert Fripp said that his differences with Adrian Belew had been resolved and that, while there were "no current plans for [him] to come out with the current formation," he could potentially be invited back to the band in the future. Belew subsequently confirmed this.

On 14 October 2017, King Crimson released another contemporary live album, Live in Chicago, recorded on tour in June of the same year. As had been the case with its two predecessors, it included new material (in this case "Bellscape & Orchestral Werning", "The Errors" and "Interlude"); it also documented the return to the live set of material from Lizard (in the form of "Cirkus", which the band had begun adding to their sets in 2016, and the second half of the title suite), as well as new arrangements of some Belew-era songs.

On 13 October 2017, it was announced that Rieflin would be unable to join the Three Over Five Formation on the 2017 Autumn tour in the U.S. He was temporarily replaced by Seattle-based Crafty Guitarist Chris Gibson. During 2018, King Crimson performed the extensive 33-date Uncertain Times tour through the UK and Europe between 13 June and 16 November.

Although the band continued to avoid studio recording, April 2018 saw the full release of another live album, Live in Vienna, presenting the complete concert in Vienna on 1 December 2016. The album was originally scheduled for worldwide release in 2017, but was postponed in lieu of Live in Chicago; however, it was only released in Japan in September 2017, with a bonus disc with recordings from the band's tour there in December 2015. The worldwide release added a performance of "Fracture", plus three pieces drawn from the nightly Fripp-composed introductory soundscapes with improvisations by Collins and Levin: these pieces were arranged and realised by David Singleton, reflecting similar work he'd performed for Thrakattak twenty years earlier. On 20 October 2018, a further live album/video was released, Meltdown: Live in Mexico City, recorded during dates in July 2017.

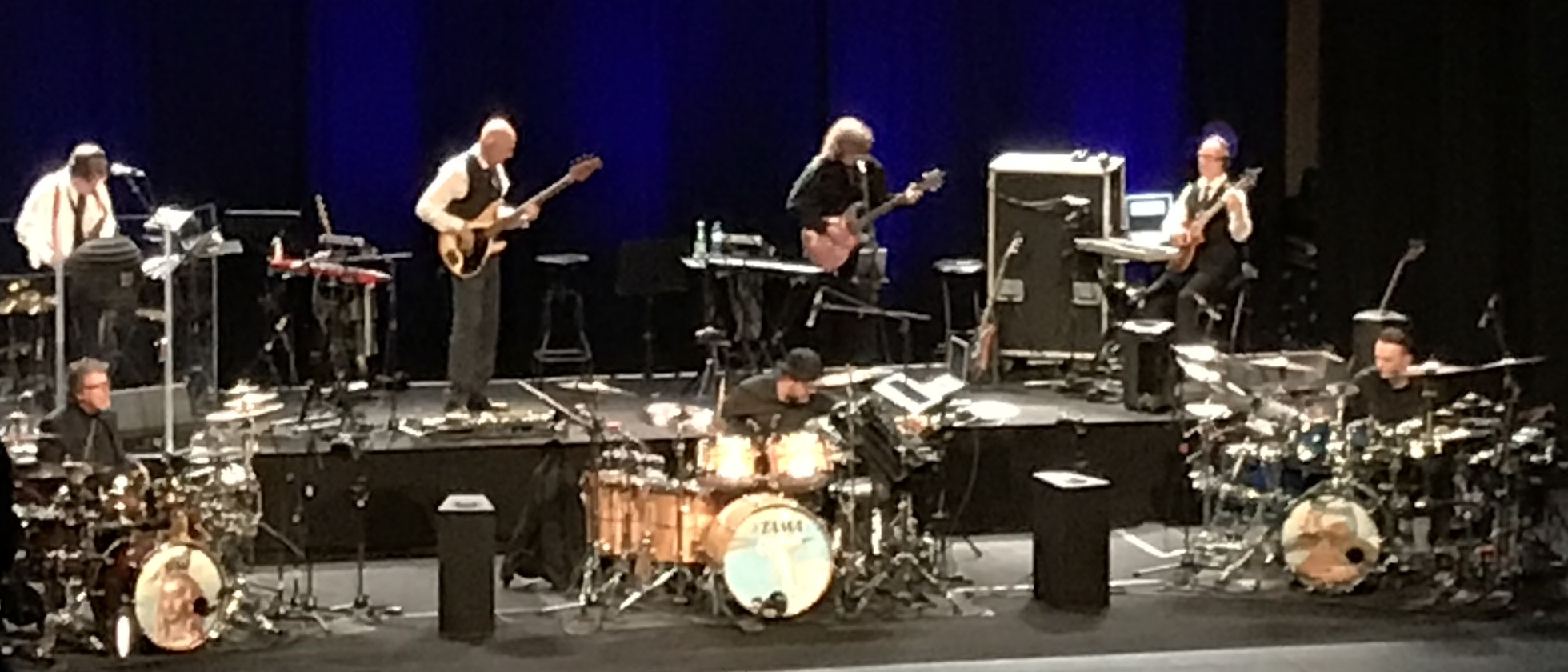
King Crimson in Nijmegen on 22 June 2019. Top L–R: Mel Collins, Tony Levin, Jakko Jakszyk, Robert Fripp. Bottom L–R: Pat Mastelotto, Jeremy Stacey, and Gavin Harrison.

On 6 April 2019, it was announced at a press conference that Rieflin would take another break from King Crimson to attend to family matters; his place on keyboards for the 2019 50th anniversary tour was set to be taken by Theo Travis of Soft Machine, an occasional duo collaborator with Fripp. Although Travis joined the band for rehearsals, Fripp said on 2 May that the band had decided that it was no longer possible to have other musicians deputising for Rieflin and for this reason would "proceed as a Seven-Headed Beast" without Travis. Rieflin's parts were divided among Fripp, Stacey, Jakszyk, Collins, and Levin. On 11 June, King Crimson's entire discography was made available on streaming services, as part of the band's 50th anniversary celebration.

On 24 March 2020, Rieflin died of cancer. In the same year, King Crimson collaborator Keith Tippett died after several years of illness on 14 June, and former bassist and singer Gordon Haskell died from lung cancer on 15 October.

King Crimson toured North America and then Japan in 2021. Recordings from dates on the American leg of the tour were released as the "official bootleg" live album Music Is Our Friend: Live in Washington and Albany, featuring music from across the band's lifetime plus two new Tony Levin cadenzas.

=== 2022: In the Court of the Crimson King documentary; end of band activity ===
Following the band's 2021 tour dates, King Crimson ceased activity without expressly announcing a breakup. Fripp cited practical reasons for concluding the band's touring career, such as the old age of several of the members and the rising cost of services during the COVID-19 pandemic.

On 9 February 2022, founding King Crimson member Ian McDonald died of cancer.

In March 2022, the documentary film In the Court of the Crimson King was premiered at the 2022 SXSW Film Festival. Directed by Toby Amies and filmed between 2019 and 2021, it covered live and backstage activity by the then-current band but also featured a historical overview plus contributions from Crimson alumni Ian McDonald, Michael Giles, Bill Bruford, Adrian Belew and Trey Gunn (as well as prolonged interview footage with the late Bill Rieflin). Amies described the film's development as follows: "What began as a traditional documentary about the legendary band King Crimson as it turned fifty, mutated into an exploration of time, death, family, and the transcendent power of music to change lives; but with jokes."

As of 2022, no King Crimson activity was planned for the future, excepting ongoing archive/curatorial matters. Levin said in a late 2022 interview that "the sense I got from Robert [Fripp] was that it's over. Maybe King Crimson will speak to him in the future in some way, and will revive its head with who-knows-what line up?" At a post-screening Q&A session for In the Court of the Crimson King, Fripp referred to the seven-member 2021 line-up of King Crimson as "the final incarnation" of the band. Asked if there could ever be a line-up that did not include him, he answered negatively, stating "I see the whole. I see the music. I see the musicians. I see the audience and I see the music industry [...] and you have to engage with all of that to have the overview. So that's the quick answer".

=== 2021–present: Post-breakup activity and abandoned fourteenth studio album ===
The 2021 retirement of King Crimson's "Seven-Headed Beast" line-up, and Fripp's subsequent statement that the band had finished, left a certain amount of written/performed King Crimson music unrecorded in the studio, although some of that material had appeared on live recordings from the time. New original songs performed in concert by the band had included "Meltdown", "Radical Action", "Radical Action II", "The Errors", and more. Versions of two Fripp/Jakszyk songs originally intended for King Crimson ("Uncertain Times" and "Separation") had also emerged on Jakszyk's 2020 solo album Secrets and Lies, with participation from Fripp, Harrison, Levin and Collins.

Following the most recent retirement of the band, Jakko Jakszyk hinted, suggested and ultimately stated that this material will see formal release as a studio album, the band's first in over twenty years since the release of The Power to Believe. In August 2021, Jakszyk referred to the existence of "about forty to fifty minutes' worth of new (King Crimson) stuff, a number of songs I've co-written with Robert and some instrumental things he's written. During the lockdown Gavin suggested, 'Why don't we record these things so we've at least got studio recordings of this material?' That doesn't mean we're going to make a new album or it's ever gonna come out, but we have started this process."

In a November 2024 interview with Louder Sound, Jakszyk was questioned about the band's future and mentioned the possibility of new studio recordings being released, stating: "The honest answer is, you'll have to ask Robert. It's all in his hands. He's retired a million times before, but he is 78. One of the things we have been doing of late is recording studio versions of the new material [only previously played live]. We've used the live recordings as a template, and I've done guitars, overdubs and backing vocals. Whether that comes out as a King Crimson album or whether it lies in the vaults, I don't know."

Eight months later, in a July 2025 interview with Goldmine magazine, Jakszyk stated that "as we speak, we're doing a King Crimson studio album" and confirmed that it featured the most recent band line-up. He cautioned "when that will come out and what format or how – that's beyond my brief. But yeah, we've been doing it piecemeal, and then a couple of months ago, the management said, 'Can we?' So, yeah. I've been recording that with a view to it coming out in some format at some point. But who knows when?... There also are future plans for some live film of us playing in various places. There's an ongoing thread. Whether that ever means we'll ever play live again, I don't know, especially after Robert's recent [heart attack]." He confirmed that the new album would feature the studio versions of new songs performed by the band between 2014 and 2021, and that "some other bits and pieces will emerge from putting it together. I think so." This news suggests that despite Fripp's 2021 announcement, King Crimson may still be active (albeit as a studio project).

In a DGM homepage and Facebook post on 11 July 2025, while suggesting the possibility of "an album the very sound of which no-one has ever heard before. A sound driven by the three drummers," David Singleton both clarified and cautioned speculation about the album. He commented that "it is true that [the three] drummers have now recorded studio versions of their parts – separately, so that there is perfect separation. So there is indeed the seed of a new recording. Whether it is an album, whether it sees the light of day, whether it is something else is unknown. As is the outcome of any creative process. So yes, recordings have taken place. We are building a new studio, and when it is complete I am looking forward to seeing what may, or may not, exist. Getting excited about the possibility of a new album, as has been happening in some quarters, is however somewhat premature. Carts before horses."

In a May 2026 interview, Fripp stated that the rumoured new album never came to fruition, that he would not play live again, and that King Crimson's career was over for good.

== Artistry ==
=== Musical style and influences ===
When it comes to the absurdly resourceful bench of progressive rock bands, King Crimson were probably the most versatile of them all. [...] Ceaselessly shifting line-ups [inspired] entirely new sounds. One could play a song from their first, third, and fifth albums and the average listener would have no clue it was the same band. And that, in some regards, is the premise and essence of progressive rock.

— Sean Murphy, Pop Matters (7 March 2023)

King Crimson have been described musically as progressive rock, art rock, and post-progressive, with their earlier works being described as proto-prog. Their music was initially grounded in the rock of the 1960s, especially the acid rock and psychedelic rock movements. The band played Donovan's "Get Thy Bearings" in concert, and were known to play the Beatles' "Lucy in the Sky with Diamonds" in their rehearsals. However, for their own compositions, King Crimson (unlike the rock bands that had come before them) largely stripped away the blues-based foundations of rock music and replaced them with influences derived from classical composers. The first incarnation of King Crimson played the Mars section of Gustav Holst's suite The Planets live and later the band used Mars as a foundation for the song "Devil's Triangle". As a result of this influence, In the Court of the Crimson King is frequently viewed as the nominal starting point of the progressive rock movements. King Crimson also initially displayed strong jazz influences, especially on its signature track "21st Century Schizoid Man". The band also drew on English folk music for compositions such as "Moonchild" and "I Talk to the Wind". In the 1972 lineup, Fripp's intention was to combine the music of Jimi Hendrix, Igor Stravinsky and Béla Bartók.

The 1981 reunion of the band brought in even more elements, displaying the influence of funk, post-punk, new wave, gamelan music and minimalist classical composers such as Philip Glass, Steve Reich and Terry Riley. For its 1994 reunion, King Crimson reassessed both the mid-1970s and 1980s approaches in the light of new technology, intervening music forms such as drum and bass and techno, and further developments in industrial music, as well as expanding the band's ambient textural content via Fripp's Soundscapes.

The 2013 version of the band returned, for the most part, to the band's 1960s and 1970s influences and repertoire but addressed them via current technology and rearrangements suited to a larger ensemble of more experienced musicians, while also incorporating the new standard tuning used by Fripp since 1984.

=== Compositional approaches ===
Several King Crimson compositional approaches remained constant throughout the band's lifetime. These included:

- The use of a gradually building rhythmic motif. These include "The Devil's Triangle" (an adaptation and variation on the Gustav Holst piece Mars played by the original King Crimson, based on a complex pulse in 5/4 time over which a skirling melody is played on a Mellotron), 1973's "The Talking Drum" (from Larks' Tongues in Aspic), 1984's "Industry" (from Three of a Perfect Pair) and 2003's "Dangerous Curves" (from The Power to Believe).
- An instrumental piece (often embedded as a break in a song) in which the band played an ensemble passage of considerable rhythmic and polyrhythmic complexity. An early example is the band's initial signature tune "21st Century Schizoid Man", but the "Larks' Tongues in Aspic" series of compositions (as well as pieces of similar intent such as "THRAK" and "Level Five") went deeper into polyrhythmic complexity, delving into rhythms that wander into and out of general synchronisation with each other, but with all 'finishing' together through polyrhythmic synchronisation. These polyrhythms were particularly abundant in the band's 1980s work, which contained gamelan-like rhythmic layers and continual overlaid staccato patterns in counterpoint.
- The composition of difficult solo passages for individual instruments, such as the guitar break on "Fracture" on Starless and Bible Black.
- The juxtaposition of ornate tunes and ballads with unusual, often dissonant noises (such as "Cirkus" from Lizard, "Ladies of the Road" from Islands and "Eyes Wide Open" from The Power to Believe).
- The use of improvisation.
- Ascending note structure (e.g. "Facts of Life" and "THRAK").

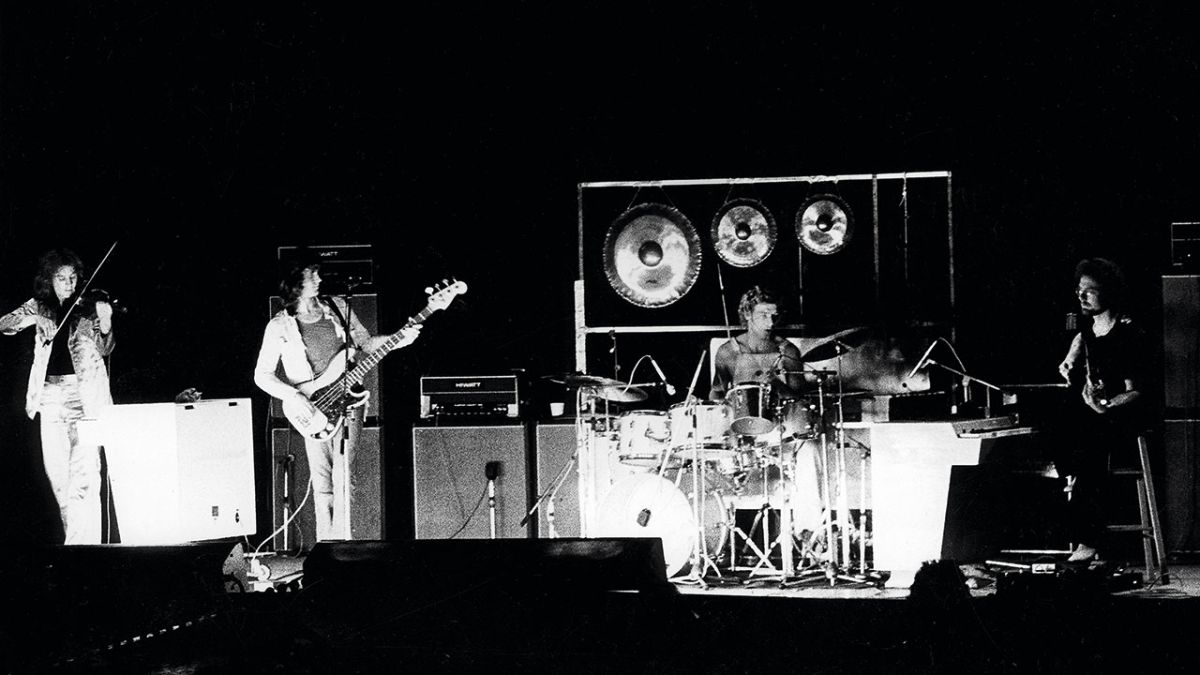
King Crimson playing in 1973

=== Improvisation ===
"We're so different from each other that one night someone in the band will play something that the rest of us have never heard before and you just have to listen for a second. Then you react to his statement, usually in a different way than they would expect. It's the improvisation that makes the group amazing for me. You know, taking chances. There is no format really in which we fall into. We discover things while improvising and if they're really basically good ideas we try and work them in as new numbers, all the while keeping the improvisation thing alive and continually expanding."

— King Crimson violinist David Cross on the mid-1970s band's approach to improvisation.

King Crimson incorporated improvisation into their performances and studio recordings from the beginning, some of which was embedded into pieces such as "Moonchild", "Providence", "Requiem" and "No Warning", including passages of restrained silence, as with Bill Bruford's contribution to the improvised "Trio". Rather than using the standard jazz or rock "jamming" format for improvisation (in which one soloist at a time takes centre stage while the rest of the band lies back and plays along with established rhythm and chord changes), King Crimson improvisation consisted of musicians collectively making creative decisions and contributions as the music is being played. Individual soloing was largely eschewed; each musician was to listen to each other and to the group sound, to be able to react creatively within the group dynamic. Fripp has used the metaphor of "magic" to describe this process, in particular when the method works particularly well.

Similarly, King Crimson's improvised music was varied in sound and the band has been able to release several box sets and albums consisting mostly or entirely of improvised music, such as the Thrakattak album, and the band's series of ProjeKcts. Occasionally, particular improvised pieces were recalled and reworked in different forms at different shows, becoming more and more refined and eventually appearing on official studio releases.

== Influence and legacy ==
King Crimson have been influential both on the early 1970s progressive rock movement and numerous contemporary artists. Genesis and Yes were directly influenced by the band's usage of the mellotron, and many King Crimson band members were involved in other notable bands: Bruford in Yes; Lake in Emerson, Lake & Palmer; McDonald in Foreigner; Burrell in Bad Company, and Wetton in King Crimson spin-off U.K. and Asia. Canadian rock band Rush's drummer Neil Peart credited the adventurous and innovative style of Michael Giles as an influence on his own approach to percussion. King Crimson also influenced progressive rock keyboardist Michael Quatro, who included a cover of The Court of the Crimson King featuring guitar by Ted Nugent on his 1972 debut album Paintings.

King Crimson's influence extends to many bands from diverse genres, especially of the 1990s and 2000s. Kurt Cobain, the frontman of the grunge band Nirvana, had stated that the album Red had a major influence on the sound of their final studio album In Utero. Tool are known to be heavily influenced by King Crimson, with vocalist Maynard James Keenan joking on a tour with them: "Now you know who we ripped off. Just don't tell anyone, especially the members of King Crimson." Modern progressive, experimental, psychedelic and indie rock bands have cited them as an influence as well, including MGMT, The Fierce and the Dead, the Mars Volta, Primus, Black Country, New Road, Mystery Jets, Fanfarlo, Phish, and Anekdoten, who first practiced together playing King Crimson songs. Steven Wilson, the leader of Porcupine Tree, was responsible for remixing King Crimson's back catalogue in surround sound and said that the process had an enormous influence on his solo albums, and his band was influenced by King Crimson. In November 2012 the Flaming Lips in collaboration with Stardeath and White Dwarfs released a track-by-track reinterpretation of In the Court of the Crimson King entitled Playing Hide and Seek with the Ghosts of Dawn. Colin Newman, of Wire, said he saw King Crimson perform many times, and that they influenced him deeply. The seminal hardcore punk group Black Flag acknowledge Wetton-era King Crimson as an influence on their experimental period in the mid-1980s. Melvin Gibbs said that the Rollins Band was influenced most by King Crimson, using similar chords. Bad Religion cites the lyrics of "21st Century Schizoid Man" on their single "21st Century (Digital Boy)" and the name of their record label, Epitaph (founded by their guitarist Brett Gurewitz), comes from the song of the same name on Crimson's debut album. Living Colour guitarist Vernon Reid considered Robert Fripp as one of his guitar influences.

King Crimson have frequently been cited as pioneers of progressive metal and as an influence on bands of this genre, including Dream Theater, Opeth, Mastodon, Between the Buried and Me, Leprous, Haken, the Ocean, Caligula's Horse, Last Chance to Reason, and Indukti. Members of metal bands Testament, Mudvayne, Voivod, Enslaved, Yob, Pyrrhon, and Pallbearer have cited King Crimson as an influence. Heavy experimental and avant-garde acts like the Dillinger Escape Plan, Neurosis, Zeni Geva, Ancestors, and Oranssi Pazuzu all cite King Crimson's influence.

Other artists affected by King Crimson include video game composer Nobuo Uematsu, noise music artist Masami Akita of Merzbow, jazz guitarist Dennis Rea of Land, folktronica exponent Juana Molina, hip hop producer RJD2, hip hop and soul composer Adrian Younge, film director Hal Hartley, and folk-pop singer Ian Kelly.

Golden Wind, the fifth part of the Japanese manga and anime franchise JoJo's Bizarre Adventure, has its main antagonist Diavolo possess a Stand known as King Crimson. Stephen King's The Dark Tower also has its main antagonist, the Crimson King, named after the band.

== Related legacy/cover bands featuring former King Crimson members ==
Since the early 2000s, several bands containing former, recent or current King Crimson members have toured and recorded, performing King Crimson music.

Active between 2002 and 2005, the 21st Century Schizoid Band reunited several former King Crimson members who had played on the band's first four albums. The band featured Ian McDonald, Mel Collins, Peter Giles and Michael Giles (the latter subsequently replaced by Ian Wallace), and was fronted by Jakko Jakszyk, a decade prior to his own recruitment into King Crimson. The band engaged in several tours, played material from King Crimson's '60s and '70s catalogue, and recorded several live albums. The band disbanded upon Wallace's death in 2007.

Since 2007, Tony Levin has led the trio Stick Men, which also features Pat Mastelotto. The band was initially completed by Chapman Stick player Michael Bernier, replaced in 2010 by touch guitarist and former Fripp student Markus Reuter. This band includes (and reinterprets) King Crimson compositions in their live sets. Reuter and Mastelotto also play together as a duo (previously called "Tuner"), within which they have been known to rework the mid-1980s King Crimson instrumental "Industry" live. Starting in 2023, Reuter, Mastelotto and Trey Gunn revived the moniker "Tuner" (re-styled as "Tu-ner") to perform music from the Double Duo era of King Crimson, plus material from each of their respective solo and combined careers.

Between 2011 and 2014, Stick Men and Adrian Belew's Power Trio band (Belew plus drummer Tobias Ralph and bass player Julie Slick) joined forces to play and tour as The Crimson ProjeKCt, covering the music made during the '80s and '90s. Following the return of King Crimson in 2014, the Crimson ProjeKct name has been formally abandoned, but the Stick Men and the Power Trio have still performed together from time to time, usually under names like "Belew, Levin, Mastelotto and friends".

During his solo career, including performances with the Power Trio, Adrian Belew has performed various versions of King Crimson songs.

In March 2024, a new spin-off supergroup called Beat performing the 1980s King Crimson repertoire was announced: this featured former members Adrian Belew and Tony Levin along with guitarist Steve Vai and drummer Danny Carey of Tool. Fripp and Bruford had both declined offers to join, but gave their blessings to the group. Fripp also suggested the eventual project name, "Beat" (after the 1982 King Crimson album). The band went on to tour the United States during the latter half of 2024.

== Band members ==
Final line-up

- Robert Fripp – guitar, keyboards, Mellotron, electronics (1968–1974, 1981–1984, 1994–2008, 2013–2021)
- Mel Collins – saxophones, flute, bass flute, clarinet, bass clarinet, Mellotron, backing vocals (1970–1972, 2013–2021)
- Tony Levin – bass guitar, Chapman Stick, upright bass, synthesisers, backing vocals (1981–1984, 1994–1999, 2003–2008, 2013–2021)
- Pat Mastelotto – drums, percussion, programming (1994–2008, 2013–2021)
- Gavin Harrison – drums, percussion (2007–2008, 2013–2021)
- Jakko Jakszyk – lead vocals, guitar, flute, keyboards (2013–2021)
- Jeremy Stacey – drums, keyboards, backing vocals (2016–2021)

== Discography ==
- In the Court of the Crimson King (1969)
- In the Wake of Poseidon (1970)
- Lizard (1970)
- Islands (1971)
- Larks' Tongues in Aspic (1973)
- Starless and Bible Black (1974)
- Red (1974)
- Discipline (1981)
- Beat (1982)
- Three of a Perfect Pair (1984)
- Thrak (1995)
- The Construkction of Light (2000)
- The Power to Believe (2003)

== General references ==
- Buckley, Peter (2003). The Rough Guide to Rock. London: Rough Guides. ISBN 1-85828-201-2.
- Tamm, Eric (1990). Robert Fripp: From Crimson King to Crafty Master. Faber and Faber. ISBN 978-0571129126.
