= Island (disambiguation) =

An island is a land mass entirely surrounded by water.

Island(s) may also refer to:

== Places ==
- Any of various islands around the world, see the list of islands
- Iceland (Icelandic: Ísland, German: Island), a Nordic island country in the North Atlantic Ocean
- Island, Belfast, Northern Ireland, an electoral ward in the UK
- Island, Kentucky, a city in the US
- Island, Yonne, a commune of the Yonne département in France
- Island County, Washington, US
- Islands (barony), in County Clare, Ireland
- Islands (regional unit), a division of Attica, Greece

== Books and publications ==
=== Fiction ===
- The Island, an 1888 novel by Richard Whiteing
- The Island, a 1914 short story collection by Elinor Mordaunt
- The Island, a 1921 novel by Bertha Runkle
- "The Island", a 1924 short story by L. P. Hartley, from his collection Night Fears
- The Island, a 1930 novel by Naomi Royde-Smith
- The Islands, a 1936 novel by Gerald Warner Brace
- The Island, a 1948 novel by Nard Jones
- The Island (French: L'île), a 1962 novel by Robert Merle
- Island (Huxley novel), 1962, by Aldous Huxley
- The Island, a 1963 novel by Robert Creeley
- Islands, a 1976 novel by Marta Randall
- The Island (Benchley novel), 1979, by Peter Benchley
- Islands, a 1980 novel by Laird Koenig
- The Island, a 1984 novel by Isabelle Holland
- Island, a 1987 novel by Thomas Perry
- The Island, a 1988 novel by Gary Paulsen
- The Island, a 1988 novel by Guy N. Smith
- The Island, a 1988 novel by T. M. Wright
- Island (Laymon novel), 1991, by Richard Laymon
- Island, a 1999 novel by Peter Lerangis, book five in the Watchers series
- Island (Rogers novel), 1999, by Jane Rogers
- Island (novel series), 2000–2006, by Gordon Korman
- Island (short story collection), 2000, by Alistair MacLeod
- The Island (Hislop novel), 2005, by Victoria Hislop
- The Islands, a 2008 novel by Di Morrissey
- The Island, a 2010 novel by Elin Hilderbrand
- The Island, a 2010 novel by Sarah Singleton
- Island, a 2015 novel by Nicky Singer, illustrated by Chris Riddell
- Island, a 2017 World Book Day (UK and Ireland) short story by David Almond
- The Island, a 2021 novel by Ben Coes
- The Island, a 2022 novel by Adrian McKinty
- The Island, a 2023 novel by Natasha Preston
- Minecraft: The Island, a 2017 novel by Max Brooks

=== Non-fiction ===
- Islands, a 1978 essay by John Fowles and Fay Godwin

=== Periodicals ===
- Islands, a travel magazine published by Bonnier Corporation

=== Poetry ===
- "The Island" (Byron), an 1823 poem by Lord Byron
- "The Island" (poem), a 1944 epic poem by Francis Brett Young
- Islands, a 1999 collection of poems by Andrew Krivak

== Music ==
=== Albums ===
- Island (Bob Brookmeyer and Kenny Wheeler album), 2003
- Island (David Arkenstone album), 1989
- Island (G-Side album), 2011
- Island (HÖH and Current 93 album), 1991
- Island, by Bear's Den (band), 2014
- Islands (Ash album), 2018
- Islands (The Band album), 1977
- Islands (Kajagoogoo album), 1984
- Islands (King Crimson album), 1971
- Islands (The Mary Onettes album), 2009
- Islands (Mike Oldfield album), 1987

=== Songs ===
- "Island" (song), by Eddy Raven, 1990
- "Island (Float Away)", by the Starting Line, 2007
- "Island", by Heather Nova from Oyster, 1994
- "Island", by Mastodon from Leviathan, 2004
- "Island", by Miley Cyrus from Endless Summer Vacation, 2023
- "Island", by the Whitest Boy Alive from Rules, 2009
- "The Island" (Paul Brady song), 1985
- "Islands" (King Crimson song), 1971
- "Islands" (Mike Oldfield song), 1987
- "Islands", by Oingo Boingo from Nothing to Fear, 1982
- "Islands" (The xx song), 2009
- "An Island", by Chevelle from La Gárgola, 2014
- "An Island", by Owen from The King of Whys, 2016

=== Other uses in music ===
- Island (band), which represented Cyprus in the Eurovision Song Contest in 1981
- Islands (band), a Canadian indie rock band
- Island Records (disambiguation), several music industry record labels

== Transport ==
- Island, a synonym for a traffic roundabout
- Island platform, a railway platform with tracks running around each side
- Refuge island, for pedestrians crossing a road
- Traffic island, dividing the lanes of travel in a road

== Visual media ==
=== Film ===
- The Island (1980 film), an American film based on the novel by Peter Benchley
- Island (1989 film), an Australian film directed by Paul Cox
- The Island (2005 film), a science fiction film
- The Island (2006 film), also known as Ostrov, a Russian film directed by Pavel Lungin
- Island (2011 film), a British film directed by Brek Taylor, Elizabeth Mitchell
- Islands (2011 film), an Italian drama
- The Island (2018 Chinese film), a Chinese fantasy comedy
- The Island (2018 Nigerian film), a Nigerian action film
- Islands (2021 film), a Canadian drama
- Islands (2025 German film), a German drama
- Islands (2025 Spanish film), a Spanish drama

=== Television ===
- Islands (miniseries), a Cartoon Network miniseries, aired as part of the eighth season of Adventure Time
- Island (South Korean TV series), a 2022 television series
- Island (Iranian TV series)

=== Video games ===
- Island (video game), 2016, by Front Wing
- Islands: Non-Places, 2016, by Carl Burton

== Other uses ==
- Islands (restaurant), a casual dining restaurant chain in the US
- Island Company, clothing brand
- Island ECN, a network for stock trading, now part of Inet
- Island-class patrol boat, a class of US Coast Guard cutters
- Ecological island, a micro-habitat within a larger differing ecosystem
- Extraction island, in linguistics, phrases out of which extraction is impossible

== See also ==
- The Island (disambiguation)
