= The Island =

The Island(s) may refer to:

== Places ==
- Any of various islands around the world, see the list of islands
- The Island (Cache County, Utah), an island on the Bear River, Utah
- The Island, Chennai, a river island in India
- The Island (Cheesman Reservoir), Douglas County, Colorado, United States
- The Island, Chicago, a neighborhood of Chicago, Illinois, United States
- The Island, Croydon, a residential building in Croydon, England
- The Island, an enclave within Hilltop, Jersey City, New Jersey, United States
- The Island, Hythe End, an island on the River Thames in England
- The Island (Jefferson County, Oregon), a United States wilderness research area
- The Island, Trenton, New Jersey, a neighborhood in Mercer County, New Jersey, United States
- The Island, a neighborhood of Waltham, Massachusetts, United States
- The Island, Western Cape, in Great Brak River, South Africa
- The Islands, a defunct provincial electoral district in British Columbia
- The Islands, a region encompassing southern Florida and the Caribbean as defined in Joel Garreau's The Nine Nations of North America.

== Books and publications ==
=== Fiction ===
- Leila: or, The Island, an 1839 novel by Ann Fraser Tytler
- The Island, an 1888 novel by Richard Whiteing
- The Island, a 1914 short story collection by Elinor Mordaunt
- The Island, a 1921 novel by Bertha Runkle
- "The Island", a 1924 short story by L. P. Hartley, from his collection Night Fears
- The Island, a 1930 novel by Naomi Royde-Smith
- The Islands, a 1936 novel by Gerald Warner Brace
- The Island, a 1948 novel by Nard Jones
- The Island, a 1963 novel by Robert Creeley
- The Island (Benchley novel), 1979, by Peter Benchley
- The Island, a 1984 novel by Isabelle Holland
- The Island, a 1988 novel by Gary Paulsen
- The Island, a 1988 novel by Guy N. Smith
- The Island, a 1988 novel by T. M. Wright
- The Island (Hislop novel), 2005, by Victoria Hislop
- The Islands, a 2008 novel by Di Morrissey
- The Island, a 2010 novel by Elin Hilderbrand
- The Island, a 2010 novel by Sarah Singleton
- The Island, a 2021 novel by Ben Coes
- The Island, a 2022 novel by Adrian McKinty
- The Island, a 2023 novel by Natasha Preston
- L'île, 1962, by Robert Merle, published in the US as The Island (1964)

=== Poetry and plays ===
- The Island (Byron), an 1823 poem by Lord Byron
- The Island (play), 1973, by Athol Fugard, John Kani, and Winston Ntshona
- The Island (poem), 1944, an epic poem by Francis Brett Young

=== Periodicals ===
- The Island (Sri Lanka), a newspaper in Sri Lanka
- Die Insel, three German magazines

== Music ==
- Island, a band which represented Cyprus in the Eurovision Song Contest in 1981
- The Island (album), by Johnny Mathis, 2017

=== Songs ===
- "An Island" (Chevelle song), 2014
- "An Island", by Owen from The King of Whys, 2016
- "The Island" (Pendulum song), 2010
- "The Island" (Paul Brady song), 1985
- "The Island", by Ivan Lins and Vítor Martins
- "The Island", by Ladytron from eponymous album Ladytron, 2019

== Transport ==
- "The island", the superstructure of an aircraft carrier

== Entertainment ==
=== Film ===
- The Island, the U.S. title of the 1960 Japanese film The Naked Island
- The Island (1934 film), a German film directed by Hans Steinhoff
- The Island (1979 film), an Argentine film directed by Alejandro Doria
- The Island (1980 film), a film directed by Michael Ritchie with Michael Caine based on Peter Benchley's novel of 1979
- The Island (2005 film), a science fiction film directed by Michael Bay
- The Island (2006 film) (Russian: Остров, or Ostrov), a 2006 film directed by Pavel Lungin
- The Island (2007 film), an Egyptian film directed by Sherif Arafa
- The Island (2011 film), a Bulgarian film directed by Kamen Kalev with Laetitia Casta
- The Island (2018 Chinese film), a Chinese comedy film directed by Huang Bo
- The Island (2018 Nigerian film), a 2018 Nigerian action film directed by Toka McBaror

=== Television ===
==== Elements ====
- The Island (Lost), setting of the TV series

==== Episodes ====
- "The Island", episode twenty-three of The Count of Monte Cristo (1956)
- "The Island" (Danger Man), a 1960 episode
- "The Island", episode eleven of Blue Thunder, 1984
- "The Island", a 1984 episode of The A-Team
- "The Island", a 1993 episode of King Arthur and the Knights of Justice
- "The Island", a 2003 episode of He-Man and the Masters of the Universe (2002)
- "The Island", a 2011 episode of Deadliest Catch
- "The Island", a 2011 episode of Redakai: Conquer the Kairu
- "The Island", a 2014 episode of Unforgettable (American)
- "The Island", a 2016 episode of The Great Food Truck Race
- "The Island", a 2019 episode of New Amsterdam (2018)
- "The Island", episode three of Jeffrey Epstein: Filthy Rich, 2020
- "The Island", a 2020 episode of Siren
- "The Island", a 2025 episode of Tales of the Teenage Mutant Ninja Turtles
- "The Island", episode two of Love, Siargao, 2026

==== Shows ====
- An t-Eilean ('The Island'), a 2025 Scottish Gaelic-language crime drama series
- To Nisi ('The Island'), a 2010 Greek TV series
- The Island with Bear Grylls, a 2014 British survival TV show
  - The Island (American TV series), a 2015 variant
- Real World/Road Rules Challenge: The Island, a 2008 reality game show
- Ninjago: The Island, a 2021 miniseries

=== Video games ===
- The Island (video game), a 1984 ZX Spectrum video game

== See also ==
- Island (disambiguation)
- Ecological island, a micro-habitat within a larger differing ecosystem
- Extraction island, in linguistics, phrases out of which extraction is impossible
- Islands (restaurant), a casual dining restaurant chain in the United States
- The Island, a Chicago radio program on WLRA
- Island Company, clothing brand
- Island-class patrol boat, class of the United States Coast Guard Cutters
