= Sailors' Tales (1970–1972) =

Box set by King Crimson
- Released: 10 November 2017
- Recorded: 1970–1971 (studio); 1971–1972 (live)
- Genre: Progressive rock
- Labels: Discipline Global Mobile; Panegyric
- Producer: King Crimson

King Crimson chronology
On (and off) The Road (1981–1984) (2016)	Sailors' Tales (1970–1972) (2017)	Heaven & Earth (2019)

Sailors' Tales (1970–1972) is the seventh of the major box set releases from English progressive rock group King Crimson, released in 2017 by Discipline Global Mobile and Panegyric Records.

Covering the period between the band's highly successful debut, In the Court of the Crimson King in 1969, and its complete reinvention prior to 1973's Larks' Tongues in Aspic, band biographer Sid Smith claims the set "documents a crucial period in King Crimson's history and shows it to be brimming with innovation, experimentation, and boundary-pushing energy."

Sailors' Tales includes the remixed and original versions of the studio albums In the Wake of Poseidon, Lizard and Islands, along with previously unheard studio recordings and a large selection of live material, most of which is available for the first time (including four recently found concert recordings) across 21 CDs, 4 blu-ray discs and 2 DVDs (all audio content), plus a booklet containing sleeve-notes by Sid Smith, Jakko Jakszyk and David Singleton. It also includes memorabilia and a further downloadable concert.

== Track listing ==
Sailors' Tales, Disc 1: In the Wake of Poseidon (1970) 2010 Stereo Mix + Bonus Tracks
No.	Title	Writer(s)	Length
1.	"Peace – A Beginning"	Fripp, Sinfield	0:50
2.	"Pictures of a City"	Fripp, Sinfield	8:01
3.	"Cadence and Cascade"	Fripp, Sinfield	4:37
4.	"In the Wake of Poseidon"	Fripp, Sinfield	8:25
5.	"Peace – A Theme"	Fripp	1:14
6.	"Cat Food"	Fripp, Sinfield, McDonald	4:53
7.	"The Devil’s Triangle (part I)"	Fripp	3:46
8.	"The Devil’s Triangle (part II)"	Fripp	4:00
9.	"The Devil’s Triangle (part III)"	Fripp	3:44
10.	"Peace – An End"	Fripp, Sinfield	1:57
11.	"Cat Food" (Bonus track – single A side)	Fripp, Sinfield, McDonald	2:56
12.	"Groon" (Bonus track – single B side)	Fripp	3:34
13.	"Cadence and Cascade" (Bonus track – Guide Vocal: Greg Lake)	Fripp, Sinfield	4:34
14.	"In the Wake of Poseidon" (Bonus track – take 3)	Fripp, Sinfield	9:15
15.	"The Devil’s Triangle (part I)" (Bonus track – part I early running mix)	Fripp	3:33
16.	"The Devil’s Triangle (part II)" (Bonus track – part II Fripp/Tippett overdubs)	Fripp	3:10
17.	"The Devil’s Triangle (part III" (Bonus track – part III Steven Wilson mix)	Fripp	3:40
18.	"Peace – An End" (Bonus track – Alternate Mix)	Fripp, Sinfield	2:08

Sailors' Tales, Disc 2: Lizard (1970) 2009 Stereo Mix + Bonus Tracks
No.	Title	Writer(s)	Length
1.	"Cirkus"	Fripp, Sinfield	6:42
2.	"Indoor Games"	Fripp, Sinfield	5:35
3.	"Happy Family"	Fripp, Sinfield	4:17
4.	"Lady of the Dancing Water"	Fripp, Sinfield	2:48
5.	"Lizard"	Fripp, Sinfield	23:35
6.	"Indoor Games" (Bonus track – Alternate Take)	Fripp, Sinfield	5:39
7.	"Happy Family" (Bonus track – Alternate Take)	Fripp, Sinfield	4:32
8.	"Lady of the Dancing Water" (Bonus track – Alternate Take)	Fripp, Sinfield	2:50
9.	"Prince Rupert Awakes" (Bonus track – Jon Anderson, vocals 2017 Mix by David Singleton)		2:35
10.	"Prince Rupert Awakes" (Bonus track – Keith Tippett, piano)		3:21
11.	"Bolero – The Peacock's Tale" (Bonus track – Original Studio Recording, Bass Overdub: Tony Levin)		6:45
12.	"Prince Rupert's Lament" (Bonus track – Alternate Take, 2015 Mix by Jakko Jakszyk)		2:36

Sailors' Tales, Disc 3: Islands (1971) 2010 Stereo Mix + Bonus Tracks
No.	Title	Writer(s)	Length
1.	"Formentera Lady"	Fripp, Sinfield	10:17
2.	"Sailor's Tale"	Fripp	7:34
3.	"The Letters"	Fripp, Sinfield	4:29
4.	"Ladies of the Road"	Fripp, Sinfield	5:34
5.	"Prelude – Song of the Gulls"	Fripp	4:16
6.	"Islands"	Fripp, Sinfield	12:02
7.	"Formentera Lady" (Bonus track – Take 2, 2010 Mix by Steven Wilson)	Fripp, Sinfield	2:23
8.	"Sailor's Tale" (Bonus track – Alternate Guitar Takes, Remix by Alex R. Mundy)	Fripp	6:19
9.	"Ladies of the Road"	Fripp, Sinfield	5:17
10.	"Prelude – Song of the Gulls" (Bonus track – String Section, Take 2)	Fripp	4:45
11.	"Islands" (Bonus track – Original Studio Recording, Vocal Overdub: Jakko Jakszyk)	Fripp, Sinfield	9:17
19.	Untitled (Bonus track – Rehearsal/Outtake, 2010 Mix by Steven Wilson)

Sailors' Tales, Disc 4: Live at The Zoom Club, Frankfurt, 12 April 1971
No.	Title	Writer(s)	Length
1.	"Cirkus" (Incomplete recording)	Fripp, Sinfield	5:18
2.	"Get Thy Bearings"	Donovan	12:28
3.	"The Court of the Crimson King"	McDonald, Sinfield	7:54
4.	"Lady of the Dancing Water"	Fripp, Sinfield	3:59
5.	"21st Century Schizoid Man"	Fripp, McDonald, Lake, Giles, Sinfield	8:18
6.	"Pictures of a City" (Incomplete recording)	Fripp, Sinfield	8:27
7.	"The Sailor's Tale"	Fripp	15:23
8.	"Cadence and Cascade"	Fripp, Sinfield	6:51
9.	"The Devil’s Triangle"	Fripp	8:41

Sailors' Tales, Disc 5: Live at The Zoom Club, Frankfurt, 13 April 1971
No.	Title	Writer(s)	Length
1.	"The Sailor's Tale" (Incomplete recording)	Fripp	10:06
2.	"Cirkus"	Fripp	7:39
3.	"Get Thy Bearings"	Donovan	10:27
4.	"Cadence and Cascade"	Fripp, Sinfield	4:14
5.	"The Court of the Crimson King"	McDonald, Sinfield	7:14
6.	"21st Century Schizoid Man" (Incomplete recording)	Fripp, McDonald, Lake, Giles, Sinfield	7:08
7.	"Pictures of a City"	Fripp, Sinfield	8:01
8.	"The Sailor's Tale"	Fripp	14:40
9.	"Lady of the Dancing Water"	Fripp, Sinfield	2:53
10.	"Get Thy Bearings"	Donovan	4:58

Sailors' Tales, Disc 6: Live at The Zoom Club, Frankfurt, 14 April 1971
No.	Title	Writer(s)	Length
1.	"Cirkus" (Incomplete recording)	Fripp, Sinfield	7:24
2.	"Get Thy Bearings"	Donovan	14:11
3.	"The Court of the Crimson King"	McDonald, Sinfield	8:19
4.	"21st Century Schizoid Man"	Fripp, McDonald, Lake, Giles, Sinfield	8:18
5.	"Pictures of a City"	Fripp, Sinfield	8:31
6.	"The Sailor's Tale"	Fripp	13:59
7.	"Cadence and Cascade"	Fripp, Sinfield	5:46
8.	"The Devil’s Triangle"	Fripp	8:32

Sailors' Tales, Disc 7: Live at The Zoom Club, Frankfurt, 15 April 1971
No.	Title	Writer(s)	Length
1.	"Pictures a City" (Incomplete recording)	Fripp, Sinfield	7:26
2.	"The Sailor's Tale"	Fripp	13:56
3.	"The Court of the Crimson King"	McDonald, Sinfield	7:42
4.	"Cadence and Cascade"	Fripp, Sinfield	5:53
5.	"The Devil’s Triangle"	Fripp	8:43
6.	"The Devil’s Triangle" (Bonus track – The Zoom Club, 13 April 1971)	Fripp	7:53

Sailors' Tales, Disc 8: Live at The Marquee, London, 10 August 1971
No.	Title	Writer(s)	Length
1.	"Pictures of a City"	Fripp, Sinfield	10:17
2.	"Formentera Lady"	Fripp, Sinfield	6:09
3.	"The Sailor's Tale"	Fripp	8:39
4.	"Cirkus"	Fripp, Sinfield	8:56
5.	"The Letters"	Fripp, Sinfield	4:57
6.	"Cadence and Cascade"	Fripp, Sinfield	4:43

Sailors' Tales, Disc 9: Live at The Marquee, London, 10 August 1971
No.	Title	Writer(s)	Length
1.	"Improv"	Fripp, Collins, Burrell, Wallace	27:38
2.	"Ladies of the Road"	Fripp, Sinfield	6:07
3.	"RF Announcement"		3:25
4.	"21st Century Schizoid Man"	Fripp, McDonald, Lake, Giles, Sinfield	11:29

Sailors' Tales, Disc 10: Live at The Armoury, Wilmington, 11 February 1972 (early show)
No.	Title	Writer(s)	Length
1.	"Pictures of a City"	Fripp, Sinfield	10:12
2.	"Formentera Lady"	Fripp, Sinfield	9:42
3.	"The Sailor's Tale"	Fripp	6:23
4.	"Cirkus"	Fripp, Sinfield	8:45
5.	"RF Announcement"		0:58
6.	"Ladies of the Road"	Fripp, Sinfield	6:19
7.	"Groon"	Fripp	15:49
8.	"21st Century Schizoid Man"	Fripp, McDonald, Lake, Giles, Sinfield	8:51

Sailors' Tales, Disc 11: Live at The Academy of Music, New York, 12 February 1972 (early show)
No.	Title	Writer(s)	Length
1.	"Pictures of a City"	Fripp, Sinfield	2:43
2.	"Formentera Lady"	Fripp, Sinfield	8:29
3.	"The Sailor's Tale"	Fripp	6:27
4.	"RF Announcement"		0:51
5.	"Cirkus"	Fripp, Sinfield	9:55
6.	"Ladies of the Road"	Fripp, Sinfield	6:23
7.	"Groon"	Fripp	16:10
8.	"21st Century Schizoid Man"	Fripp, McDonald, Lake, Giles, Sinfield	10:26

Sailors' Tales, Disc 12: Live at The Academy of Music, New York, 12 February 1972 (late show)
No.	Title	Writer(s)	Length
1.	"Pictures of a City" (Incomplete recording)	Fripp, Sinfield	2:28
2.	"Formentera Lady"	Fripp, Sinfield	10:04
3.	"The Sailor's Tale"	Fripp	5:53
4.	"RF Announcement"		1:28
5.	"Cirkus"	Fripp, Sinfield	9:10
6.	"RF Announcement"		1:09
7.	"Ladies of the Road"	Fripp, Sinfield	6:33
8.	"Groon"	Fripp	21:55
9.	"21st Century Schizoid Man"	Fripp, McDonald, Lake, Giles, Sinfield	13:08
10.	"Cadence and Cascade" (Incomplete recording)	Fripp, Sinfield	1:35

Sailors' Tales, Disc 13: Live at Cinderella Ballroom, Detroit, 18 February 1972
No.	Title	Writer(s)	Length
1.	"Pictures of a City"	Fripp, Sinfield	9:41
2.	"Formentera Lady"	Fripp, Sinfield	9:34
3.	"The Sailor's Tale"	Fripp	7:00
4.	"Cirkus"	Fripp, Sinfield	8:49
5.	"RF Announcement"		1:12
6.	"Ladies of the Road"	Fripp, Sinfield	6:00
7.	"Groon"	Fripp	19:24
8.	"21st Century Schizoid Man"	Fripp, McDonald, Lake, Giles, Sinfield	11:05

Sailors' Tales, Disc 14: Live at Stanley Theatre, Pittsburgh, 6 March 1972
No.	Title	Writer(s)	Length
1.	"Pictures of a City"	Fripp, Sinfield	8:38
2.	"Formentera Lady"	Fripp, Sinfield	8:43
3.	"The Sailor's Tale"	Fripp	7:00
4.	"Cirkus"	Fripp, Sinfield	9:09
5.	"Ladies of the Road"	Fripp, Sinfield	6:21
6.	"Groon"	Fripp	16:56
7.	"21st Century Schizoid Man"	Fripp, McDonald, Lake, Giles, Sinfield	10:52
8.	"Improv"	Fripp, Collins, Burrell, Wallace	6:35

Sailors' Tales, Disc 15: Live at Riverside Theatre, Milwaukee, 8 March 1972
No.	Title	Writer(s)	Length
1.	"Pictures of a City"	Fripp, Sinfield	9:39
2.	"Formentera Lady"	Fripp, Sinfield	9:33
3.	"The Sailor's Tale"	Fripp	8:28
4.	"Cirkus"	Fripp, Sinfield	9:54
5.	"Ladies of the Road"	Fripp, Sinfield	6:36
6.	"Groon" (Incomplete recording)	Fripp	15:54
7.	"21st Century Schizoid Man"	Fripp, McDonald, Lake, Giles, Sinfield	13:39
8.	"Cadence and Cascade"	Fripp, Sinfield	4:40

Sailors' Tales, Disc 16: Live at The Barn, Peoria, 10 March 1972
No.	Title	Writer(s)	Length
1.	"Cirkus" (Incomplete recording)	Fripp, Sinfield	1:50
2.	"RF Announcement"		1:04
3.	"Ladies of the Road"	Fripp, Sinfield	5:53
4.	"Groon – Peoria" (Incomplete recording)	Fripp, Collins, Burrell, Wallace	19:31
5.	"21st Century Schizoid Man" (Incomplete recording)	Fripp, McDonald, Lake, Giles, Sinfield	7:37
6.	"Improv" (Incomplete recording)	Fripp, Collins, Burrell, Wallace	5:56
7.	"Cadence and Cascade"	Fripp, Sinfield	4:47

Sailors' Tales, Disc 17: Live at Summit Studios, Denver, 12 March 1972
No.	Title	Writer(s)	Length
1.	"Pictures of a City"	Fripp, Sinfield	9:35
2.	"Cadence and Cascade"	Fripp, Sinfield	4:49
3.	"Groon"	Fripp	13:51
4.	"21st Century Schizoid Man"	Fripp, McDonald, Lake, Giles, Sinfield	10:14
5.	"Improv: Summit Going On"	Fripp, Collins, Burrell, Wallace	11:44
6.	"My Hobby"	Wallace	1:28
7.	"The Sailor's Tale"	Fripp	7:01
8.	"Improv: Summit And Something Else (including The Creator Has A Master Plan)"	Fripp, Collins, Burrell, Wallace, Pharoah Sanders	15:31

Sailors' Tales, Disc 18: Earthbound (1972, live album) + Bonus Tracks
No.	Title	Writer(s)	Length
1.	"21st Century Schizoid Man" (Wilmington, 11 February 1972)	Fripp, McDonald, Lake, Giles, Sinfield	11:38
2.	"Peoria" (Peoria, 10 March 1972)	Fripp, Collins, Burrell, Wallace	7:22
3.	"The Sailor's Tale" (Jacksonville, 26 February 1972)	Fripp	4:49
4.	"Earthbound" (Orlando, 27 February 1972)	Fripp, Collins, Burrell, Wallace	6:14
5.	"Groon" (Wilmington, 11 February 1972)	Fripp	15:33
6.	"Pictures of a City" (Bonus track – Milwaukee, 8 March 1972)	Fripp, Sinfield	8:21
7.	"Formentera Lady" (Bonus track – Milwaukee, 8 March 1972)	Fripp, Sinfield	9:30
8.	"Cirkus" (Bonus track – Orlando, 27 February 1972)	Fripp, Sinfield	8:24

Sailors' Tales, Disc 19: Blu-ray disc 1 – In the Wake of Poseidon (1970) – plus extras
No.	Title	Length
1.	"Peace – A Beginning" (Original Stereo/New Stereo/5.1 24/96)	0:50
2.	"Pictures of a City" (Original Stereo/New Stereo/5.1 24/96)	8:01
3.	"Cadence and Cascade" (Original Stereo/New Stereo/5.1 24/96)	4:37
4.	"In the Wake of Poseidon" (Original Stereo/New Stereo/5.1 24/96)	8:25
5.	"Peace – A Theme" (Original Stereo/New Stereo/5.1 24/96)	1:14
6.	"Cat Food" (Original Stereo/New Stereo/5.1 24/96)	4:53
7.	"The Devil's Triangle (Part I)" (Original Stereo/5.1 24/96 only)	3:46
8.	"The Devil's Triangle (Part II)" (Original Stereo/5.1 24/96 only)	4:00
9.	"The Devil's Triangle (Part III)" (Original Stereo/5.1 24/96 only)	3:44
10.	"Peace – An End" (Original Stereo/New Stereo/5.1 24/96)	1:57
11.	"Groon" (Stereo/5.1 24/96 – Additional Material – 2010 Mix)	3:34
12.	"The Devil's Triangle" (Stereo/5.1 24/96 – Additional Material – Mixed from Surviving Multitrack Elements by Steven Wilson)	3:40
13.	"Peace – A Beginning" (Stereo 24/96 – In the Wake of Poseidon – An Alternative Album Selection – Live: Japan, 2015 from Japanese Heroes EP)	2:08
14.	"A Man, a City" (Stereo 24/96 – In the Wake of Poseidon – An Alternative Album Selection – Live: Fillmore West, 15 December 1969 from Epitaph)	11:19
15.	"Cadence and Cascade" (Stereo 24/96 – In the Wake of Poseidon – An Alternative Album Selection – Guide Vocal: Greg Lake from 40th anniversary DVD-A)	4:34
16.	"In the Wake of Poseidon" (Stereo 24/96 – In the Wake of Poseidon – An Alternative Album Selection – Unedited Master, Rough Mix)	9:15
17.	"Peace – A Theme" (Stereo 24/96 – In the Wake of Poseidon – An Alternative Album Selection – Robert Fripp, Rehearsal)	2:06
18.	"Cat Food" (Stereo 24/96 – In the Wake of Poseidon – An Alternative Album Selection – Mono Single Mix)	2:45
19.	"The Devil's Triangle (Part I)" (Stereo 24/96 – In the Wake of Poseidon – An Alternative Album Selection – Early Recording, Rough Mix)	3:33
20.	"The Devil's Triangle (Part II)" (Stereo 24/96 – In the Wake of Poseidon – An Alternative Album Selection – Mars, Part II,4 Track Recording)	3:10
21.	"The Devil's Triangle (Part III)" (Stereo 24/96 – In the Wake of Poseidon – An Alternative Album Selection – Mixed from Surviving Multitrack Elements by Steven Wilson)	3:40
22.	"Peace – An End" (Stereo 24/96 – In the Wake of Poseidon – An Alternative Album Selection – Alternate Mix from 40th anniversary DVD-A)	2:08
23.	"Cadence and Cascade" (Stereo 24/96 – Additional Material – Original Studio Recording, Vocal Overdub: Jakko Jakszyk)	5:37
24.	"Groon" (Stereo 24/96 – Additional Material – Single B Side)	3:34
25.	"Cat Food" (Stereo 24/96 – Additional Material – Single A Side)	2:56
26.	"In The Wake of Poseidon" (Stereo 24/96 – Additional Material – Instrumental Mix)	4:02
27.	"The Devil's Triangle" (Stereo 24/96 – Additional Material – Mars, Pt III piano prominent)	3:32
28.	"Cadence and Cascade" (Stereo 24/96 – Additional Material – Unedited Master)	5:44
29.	"Cat Food" (Stereo 24/96 – Additional Material – Rehearsal Take)	5:33
30.	"Groon" (Stereo 24/96 – Additional Material – Take 1)	3:31
31.	"The Devil's Triangle" (Stereo 24/96 – Additional Material – Rehearsal Take, Wessex Studios)	10:55
32.	"Cadence and Cascade" (Stereo 24/96 – Additional Material – Original Studio Recording, Vocal Overdub: Adrian Belew)	4:09
33.	"Groon" (Stereo 24/96 – Additional Material – Take 4)	2:52
34.	"Groon" (Stereo 24/96 – Additional Material – Take 5)	3:45
35.	"Groon" (Stereo 24/96 – Additional Material – Take 6)	3:48
36.	"The Devil's Triangle (Part III)" (Stereo 24/96 – Additional Material – Mars, Part III, 4 Track Recording)	3:35
37.	"Cadence and Cascade" (Stereo 24/96 – Additional Material – Rehearsal take, Wessex Studios)	5:32
38.	"Groon" (Stereo 24/96 – Additional Material – Take 15)	3:55
39.	"Peace – A Beginning" (Stereo 24/96 – Needledrops: ILPS 9127 – In the Wake of Poseidon –)	0:55
40.	"Pictures of a City" (Stereo 24/96 – Needledrops: ILPS 9127 – In the Wake of Poseidon –)	8:00
41.	"Cadence and Cascade" (Stereo 24/96 – Needledrops: ILPS 9127 – In the Wake of Poseidon –)	4:37
42.	"In the Wake of Poseidon" (Stereo 24/96 – Needledrops: ILPS 9127 – In the Wake of Poseidon –)	8:28
43.	"Peace – A Theme" (Stereo 24/96 – Needledrops: ILPS 9127 – In the Wake of Poseidon –)	1:17
44.	"Cat Food" (Stereo 24/96 – Needledrops: ILPS 9127 – In the Wake of Poseidon –)	4:56
45.	"The Devil's Triangle (Part I)" (Stereo 24/96 – Needledrops: ILPS 9127 – In the Wake of Poseidon –)	3:49
46.	"The Devil's Triangle (Part II)" (Stereo 24/96 – Needledrops: ILPS 9127 – In the Wake of Poseidon –)	3:57
47.	"The Devil's Triangle (Part III)" (Stereo 24/96 – Needledrops: ILPS 9127 – In the Wake of Poseidon –)	3:46
48.	"Peace – An End" (Stereo 24/96 – Needledrops: ILPS 9127 – In the Wake of Poseidon –)	1:56
49.	"Cat Food" (Stereo 24/96 – Needledrops: WIP 6080 a/b – Cat Food – Single A Side)	2:47
50.	"Groon" (Stereo 24/96 – Needledrops: WIP 6080 a/b – Cat Food – Single B Side)	3:34

Sailors' Tales, Disc 20: Blu-ray disc 2 – Lizard (1970) – plus extras
No.	Title	Length
1.	"Cirkus" (Original Stereo/New Stereo/5.1 24/96)	6:42
2.	"Indoor Games" (Original Stereo/New Stereo/5.1 24/96)	5:35
3.	"Happy Family" (Original Stereo/New Stereo/5.1 24/96)	4:17
4.	"Lady of the Dancing Water" (Original Stereo/New Stereo/5.1 24/96)	2:48
5.	"Lizard" (Original Stereo/New Stereo/5.1 24/96)	23:35
6.	"Cirkus" (Stereo 24/96 Lizard: An Alternative Album Selection – Live, Moore Theatre, Seattle, 11 June 2017)	7:44
7.	"Indoor Games" (Stereo 24/96 Lizard: An Alternative Album Selection – Alternate Take)	5:39
8.	"Happy Family" (Stereo 24/96 Lizard: An Alternative Album Selection – Alternate Take)	4:32
9.	"Lady of the Dancing Water" (Stereo 24/96 Lizard: An Alternative Album Selection – Alternate Take)	2:50
10.	"Prince Rupert Awakes" (Stereo 24/96 Lizard: An Alternative Album Selection – Jon Anderson, vocals, 2017 Mix by David Singleton)	2:35
11.	"Prince Rupert Awakes" (Stereo 24/96 Lizard: An Alternative Album Selection – Keith Tippett, piano)	3:21
12.	"Bolero – The Peacock's Tale" (Stereo 24/96 Lizard: An Alternative Album Selection – Original Studio Recording, Bass Overdub: Tony Levin)	6:45
13.	"The Lizard Suite" (Stereo 24/96 Lizard: An Alternative Album Selection – Live, Centre Videotron, Quebec City, Canada, 7 July 2017)	11:21
14.	"Cirkus" (Additional Material – Extract: Robert Fripp, guitar)	0:42
15.	"Cirkus" (Additional Material – Studio Run Through with Guide Vocal)	6:31
16.	"Cirkus" (Additional Material – Extract 2: Robert Fripp, guitar)	0:29
17.	"Indoor Games" (Additional Material – Redux Mix)	2:22
18.	"Happy Family" (Additional Material – Redux Mix)	2:09
19.	"Mel&Tron" (Additional Material – Mel Collins, Robert Fripp, Working Idea)	0:56
20.	"Lady of the Dancing Water" (Additional Material – Take 1: Robert Fripp, guitar)	1:57
21.	"Dawn Song" (Additional Material – Take with Metronome)	3:12
22.	"Last Skirmish" (Additional Material – Keith Tippett, piano; Gordon Haskell, bass; Andy McCulloch, drums)	1:06
23.	"Cirkus" (Additional Material – Mark Charig, Cornet; Gordon Haskell, bass; Andy McCulloch, drums)	1:43
24.	"Happy Family" (Additional Material – Fulham Palace Café Rehearsal)	3:29
25.	"Prince Rupert's Lament" (Additional Material – Alternate Take, 2015 Mix by Jakko Jakszyk)	2:36
26.	"Big Top" (Additional Material – Keith Tippett, piano)	1:33
27.	"Prince Rupert Awakes" (Additional Material – Endpiece: Jon Anderson, vocals 2017 Mix by David Singleton)	0:47
28.	"Cirkus" (Stereo 24/96 – Needledrop: ILPS 9141 – Lizard)	6:30
29.	"Indoor Games" (Stereo 24/96 – Needledrop: ILPS 9141 – Lizard)	5:37
30.	"Happy Family" (Stereo 24/96 – Needledrop: ILPS 9141 – Lizard)	4:20
31.	"Lady of the Dancing Water" (Stereo 24/96 – Needledrop: ILPS 9141 – Lizard)	2:46
32.	"Lizard" (Stereo 24/96 – Needledrop: ILPS 9141 – Lizard)	23:17
33.	"Blow No. 1" (Rehearsals for 1971/72 band line-up)	45:09
34.	"Blow No. 2" (Rehearsals for 1971/72 band line-up)	27:38
35.	"Blow No. 3" (Rehearsals for 1971/72 band line-up)	24:23

Sailors' Tales, Disc 21: Blu-ray disc 3 – Islands (1971) – plus extras
No.	Title	Length
1.	"Formentera Lady" (Original Stereo/New Stereo/5.1 24/96)	10:17
2.	"Sailor's Tale" (Original Stereo/New Stereo/5.1 24/96)	7:34
3.	"The Letters" (Original Stereo/New Stereo/5.1 24/96)	4:29
4.	"Ladies of the Road" (Original Stereo/New Stereo/5.1 24/96)	5:34
5.	"Prelude: Song of the Gulls" (Original Stereo/New Stereo/5.1 24/96)	4:16
6.	"Islands" (Original Stereo/New Stereo/5.1 24/96)	12:02
7.	"Formentera Lady" (Stereo 24/48 – Islands: An Alternative Album Selection – Take 2, 2010 Mix by Steven Wilson)	2:23
8.	"Sailor's Tale" (Stereo 24/48 – Islands: An Alternative Album Selection – Alternate guitar takes, Remix by Alex R. Mundy)	6:19
9.	"The Letters" (Stereo 24/48 – Islands: An Alternative Album Selection – Outtake)	2:43
10.	"Ladies of the Road" (Stereo 24/48 – Islands: An Alternative Album Selection – Rehearsal/Outtake, 2010 Mix by Steven Wilson)	5:17
11.	"Prelude: Song of the Gulls" (Stereo 24/48 – Islands: An Alternative Album Selection – String Section, Take 2)	4:45
12.	"Islands Fragment" (Stereo 24/48 – Islands: An Alternative Album Selection – Reference Cassette Fragment: Robert Fripp, Mellotron)	0:33
13.	"Islands" (Stereo 24/48 – Islands: An Alternative Album Selection – Original Studio Recording, Vocal overdub: Jakko Jakszyk)	9:17
14.	"Islands" (Stereo 24/48 – Islands: An Alternative Album Selection – Early Rehearsal Fragment: Robert Fripp and Paulina Lucas)	0:39
15.	"Formentera Lady" (Additional Material – Early Take, Rough Mix)	8:14
16.	"Sailor's Tale" (Additional Material – Edit, Alternate Mix, 2010 by Steven Wilson)	3:37
17.	"Drop In" (Additional Material – Early Rehearsal)	3:47
18.	"Ladies of the Road" (Additional Material – Robert Fripp and David Singleton Remix)	5:42
19.	"Islands" (Additional Material – Studio run through with oboe prominent)	2:01
20.	"Formentera Lady" (Additional Material – Take 1)	2:30
21.	"A Peacemaking Stint Unrolls" (Additional Material – Islands Session: Outtake)	3:55
22.	"Ladies of the Road" (Additional Material – Take 5)	5:27
23.	"Islands" (Additional Material – Early Studio Run Through)	10:58
24.	"Formentera Lady" (Additional Material – Take 3)	2:21
25.	"Studio Soundcheck" (Additional Material – Boz Burrell, Robert Fripp, Ian Wallace, July 1971)	1:08
26.	"Fulham Palace Café Rehearsal" (Additional Material – Mel Collins, Robert Fripp, Ian Wallace, December 1970)	2:43
27.	"Ladies of the Road" (Additional Material – Early Rough Mix)	5:48
28.	"Formentera Lady" (Additional Material – Take 4)	2:51
29.	"Formentera Lady" (Stereo 24/96 – Needledrop: ILPS 9175 – Islands)	10:19
30.	"Sailor's Tale" (Stereo 24/96 – Needledrop: ILPS 9175 – Islands)	7:27
31.	"The Letters" (Stereo 24/96 – Needledrop: ILPS 9175 – Islands)	4:27
32.	"Ladies of the Road" (Stereo 24/96 – Needledrop: ILPS 9175 – Islands)	5:36
33.	"Prelude: Song of the Gulls" (Stereo 24/96 – Needledrop: ILPS 9175 – Islands)	4:16
34.	"Islands" (Stereo 24/96 – Needledrop: ILPS 9175 – Islands)	11:57
35.	"Cirkus" (Stereo 24/48 – Live, Zoom Club, Frankfurt, 12 April 1971 – Incomplete recording)	5:18
36.	"Get Thy Bearings" (Stereo 24/48 – Live, Zoom Club, Frankfurt, 12 April 1971 – Incomplete recording)	12:28
37.	"The Court of the Crimson King" (Stereo 24/48 – Live, Zoom Club, Frankfurt, 12 April 1971)	7:54
38.	"Lady of the Dancing Water" (Stereo 24/48 – Live, Zoom Club, Frankfurt, 12 April 1971)	3:59
39.	"21st Century Schizoid Man" (Stereo 24/48 – Live, Zoom Club, Frankfurt, 12 April 1971)	8:18
40.	"Pictures of a City" (Stereo 24/48 – Live, Zoom Club, Frankfurt, 12 April 1971 – Incomplete recording)	8:27
41.	"The Sailor's Tale" (Stereo 24/48 – Live, Zoom Club, Frankfurt, 12 April 1971)	15:23
42.	"Cadence and Cascade" (Stereo 24/48 – Live, Zoom Club, Frankfurt, 12 April 1971)	6:51
43.	"The Devil's Triangle" (Stereo 24/48 – Live, Zoom Club, Frankfurt, 12 April 1971)	8:41
44.	"The Sailor's Tale" (Stereo 24/48 – Live, Zoom Club, Frankfurt, 13 April 1971 – Incomplete recording)	10:06
45.	"Cirkus" (Stereo 24/48 – Live, Zoom Club, Frankfurt, 13 April 1971)	7:39
46.	"Get Thy Bearings" (Stereo 24/48 – Live, Zoom Club, Frankfurt, 13 April 1971)	10:27
47.	"Cadence and Cascade" (Stereo 24/48 – Live, Zoom Club, Frankfurt, 13 April 1971)	4:14
48.	"The Court of the Crimson King" (Stereo 24/48 – Live, Zoom Club, Frankfurt, 13 April 1971)	7:14
49.	"21st Century Schizoid Man" (Stereo 24/48 – Live, Zoom Club, Frankfurt, 13 April 1971 – Incomplete recording)	7:08
50.	"Pictures of a City" (Stereo 24/48 – Live, Zoom Club, Frankfurt, 13 April 1971)	8:01
51.	"The Sailor's Tale" (Stereo 24/48 – Live, Zoom Club, Frankfurt, 13 April 1971)	14:40
52.	"Lady of the Dancing Water" (Stereo 24/48 – Live, Zoom Club, Frankfurt, 13 April 1971)	2:53
53.	"Get Thy Bearings" (Stereo 24/48 – Live, Zoom Club, Frankfurt, 13 April 1971 – Incomplete recording)	4:58
54.	"The Devil's Triangle" (Stereo 24/48 – Live, Zoom Club, Frankfurt, 13 April 1971)	7:53
55.	"Cirkus" (Stereo 24/48 – Live, Zoom Club, Frankfurt, 14 April 1971 – Incomplete recording)	7:24
56.	"Get Thy Bearings" (Stereo 24/48 – Live, Zoom Club, Frankfurt, 14 April 1971)	14:11
57.	"The Court of the Crimson King" (Stereo 24/48 – Live, Zoom Club, Frankfurt, 14 April 1971)	8:19
58.	"21st Century Schizoid Man" (Stereo 24/48 – Live, Zoom Club, Frankfurt, 14 April 1971)	8:18
59.	"Pictures of a City" (Stereo 24/48 – Live, Zoom Club, Frankfurt, 14 April 1971 – Incomplete recording)	8:31
60.	"The Sailor's Tale" (Stereo 24/48 – Live, Zoom Club, Frankfurt, 14 April 1971)	13:59
61.	"Cadence and Cascade" (Stereo 24/48 – Live, Zoom Club, Frankfurt, 14 April 1971)	5:46
62.	"The Devil's Triangle" (Stereo 24/48 – Live, Zoom Club, Frankfurt, 14 April 1971)	8:32
63.	"Pictures of a City" (Stereo 24/48 – Live, Zoom Club, Frankfurt, 15 April 1971 – Incomplete recording)	7:26
64.	"The Sailor's Tale" (Stereo 24/48 – Live, Zoom Club, Frankfurt, 15 April 1971)	13:56
65.	"The Court of the Crimson King" (Stereo 24/48 – Live, Zoom Club, Frankfurt, 15 April 1971)	7:42
66.	"Cadence and Cascade" (Stereo 24/48 – Live, Zoom Club, Frankfurt, 15 April 1971)	5:53
67.	"The Devil's Triangle" (Stereo 24/48 – Live, Zoom Club, Frankfurt, 15 April 1971)	8:43
68.	"Cirkus" (Stereo 24/48 – Live, Guildhall, Plymouth, 11 May 1971)	8:11
69.	"Pictures of a City" (Stereo 24/48 – Live, Guildhall, Plymouth, 11 May 1971)	8:52
70.	"The Sailor's Tale" (Stereo 24/48 – Live, Guildhall, Plymouth, 11 May 1971)	15:31
71.	"The Letters" (Stereo 24/48 – Live, Guildhall, Plymouth, 11 May 1971)	4:48
72.	"Lady of the Dancing Water" (Stereo 24/48 – Live, Guildhall, Plymouth, 11 May 1971)	2:53
73.	"Cadence and Cascade" (Stereo 24/48 – Live, Guildhall, Plymouth, 11 May 1971)	4:21
74.	"Get Thy Bearings" (Stereo 24/48 – Live, Guildhall, Plymouth, 11 May 1971 – Incomplete recording)	10:48
75.	"The Court of the Crimson King" (Stereo 24/48 – Live, Guildhall, Plymouth, 11 May 1971)	8:09
76.	"Ladies of the Road" (Stereo 24/48 – Live, Guildhall, Plymouth, 11 May 1971)	5:39
77.	"RF Announcement" (Stereo 24/48 – Live, Guildhall, Plymouth, 11 May 1971)	3:26
78.	"21st Century Schizoid Man" (Stereo 24/48 – Live, Guildhall, Plymouth, 11 May 1971)	8:55
79.	"The Devil's Triangle" (Stereo 24/48 – Live, Guildhall, Plymouth, 11 May 1971)	9:14
80.	"Pictures of a City" (Stereo 24/48 – Live, Green's Playhouse, Glasgow, 28 May 1971 – Incomplete recording)	7:51
81.	"The Sailor's Tale" (Stereo 24/48 – Live, Green's Playhouse, Glasgow, 28 May 1971)	14:28
82.	"The Court of the Crimson King" (Stereo 24/48 – Live, Green's Playhouse, Glasgow, 28 May 1971)	8:42
83.	"Cadence and Cascade" (Stereo 24/48 – Live, Green's Playhouse, Glasgow, 28 May 1971 – Incomplete recording)	1:25
84.	"Get Thy Bearings" (Stereo 24/48 – Live, Green's Playhouse, Glasgow, 28 May 1971)	13:23
85.	"RF Announcement" (Stereo 24/48 – Live, Green's Playhouse, Glasgow, 28 May 1971)	0:50
86.	"Ladies of the Road" (Stereo 24/48 – Live, Green's Playhouse, Glasgow, 28 May 1971)	5:36
87.	"RF Announcement" (Stereo 24/48 – Live, Green's Playhouse, Glasgow, 28 May 1971)	1:59
88.	"21st Century Schizoid Man" (Stereo 24/48 – Live, Green's Playhouse, Glasgow, 28 May 1971)	9:23
89.	"The Devil's Triangle" (Stereo 24/48 – Live, Green's Playhouse, Glasgow, 28 May 1971)	9:54
90.	"Cirkus" (Stereo 24/48 – Live, Green's Playhouse, Glasgow, 28 May 1971 – Incomplete recording)	4:13
91.	"Pictures of a City" (Stereo 24/48 – Live, Marquee Club, London, 10 August 1971)	10:17
92.	"Formentera Lady" (Stereo 24/48 – Live, Marquee Club, London, 10 August 1971)	6:09
93.	"The Sailor's Tale" (Stereo 24/48 – Live, Marquee Club, London, 10 August 1971)	8:39
94.	"Cirkus" (Stereo 24/48 – Live, Marquee Club, London, 10 August 1971)	8:56
95.	"The Letters" (Stereo 24/48 – Live, Marquee Club, London, 10 August 1971)	4:57
96.	"Cadence and Cascade" (Stereo 24/48 – Live, Marquee Club, London, 10 August 1971)	4:43
97.	"Improv" (Stereo 24/48 – Live, Marquee Club, London, 10 August 1971)	27:38
98.	"Ladies of the Road" (Stereo 24/48 – Live, Marquee Club, London, 10 August 1971)	6:07
99.	"RF Announcement" (Stereo 24/48 – Live, Marquee Club, London, 10 August 1971)	3:25
100.	"21st Century Schizoid Man" (Stereo 24/48 – Live, Marquee Club, London, 10 August 1971)	11:29
101.	"Pictures of a City" (Stereo 24/48 – Live, Eastown Theatre, Detroit, 13 November 1971)	9:02
102.	"Formentera Lady" (Stereo 24/48 – Live, Eastown Theatre, Detroit, 13 November 1971)	9:09
103.	"The Sailor's Tale" (Stereo 24/48 – Live, Eastown Theatre, Detroit, 13 November 1971)	5:54
104.	"Cirkus" (Stereo 24/48 – Live, Eastown Theatre, Detroit, 13 November 1971)	9:16
105.	"Ladies of the Road" (Stereo 24/48 – Live, Eastown Theatre, Detroit, 13 November 1971)	7:55
106.	"Groon" (Stereo 24/48 – Live, Eastown Theatre, Detroit, 13 November 1971 – Incomplete recording)	17:58
107.	"21st Century Schizoid Man" (Stereo 24/48 – Live, Eastown Theatre, Detroit, 13 November 1971)	9:27
108.	"RF Announcement" (Stereo 24/48 – Live, Eastown Theatre, Detroit, 13 November 1971)	3:53
109.	"The Devil's Triangle" (Stereo 24/48 – Live, Eastown Theatre, Detroit, 13 November 1971)	13:25
110.	"The Court of the Crimson King" (Stereo 24/48 – Live, Eastown Theatre, Detroit, 13 November 1971)	3:27
111.	"Lady of the Dancing Water" (Stereo 24/48 – Live, Eastown Theatre, Detroit, 13 November 1971)	2:20

Sailors' Tales, Disc 22: Blu-ray disc 4 – Earthbound – U.S.A. Live 1972 – plus extras
No.	Title	Writer(s)	Length
1.	"21st Century Schizoid Man" (Wilmington, 11 February 1972 – New sequence Stereo (24/96))
2.	"Peoria" (Peoria, 10 March 1972 – New sequence Stereo (24/96))
3.	"The Sailor's Tale" (Jacksonville, 26 February 1972 – New sequence Stereo (24/96))
4.	"Earthbound" (Orlando, 27 February 1972 – New sequence Stereo (24/96))
5.	"Groon" (Wilmington, 11 February 1972 – New sequence Stereo (24/96))
6.	"Pictures of a City" (Milwaukee, 8 March 1972 – New sequence Stereo (24/96))
7.	"Formentera Lady" (Milwaukee, 8 March 1972 – New sequence Stereo (24/96))
8.	"Cirkus" (Orlando, 27 February 1972 – New sequence Stereo (24/96))
9.	"Ladiesof tf The Road" (Orlando, 27 February 1972 – New sequence Stereo (24/96))
10.	"The Letters" (Denver, 13 March 1972 – New sequence Stereo (24/96))
11.	"The Sailor's Tale" (Jacksonville, 26 February 1972 – extended version – New sequence Stereo (24/96))
12.	"Groon" (Peoria, 10 March 1972 – New sequence Stereo (24/96))
13.	"Pictures of a City" (Live at Summit Studios, Denver,12 March 1972 – New Stereo and Quadraphonic 24/96)
14.	"Cadence and Cascade" (Live at Summit Studios, Denver,12 March 1972 – New Stereo and Quadraphonic 24/96)
15.	"Groon" (Live at Summit Studios, Denver,12 March 1972 – New Stereo and Quadraphonic 24/96)
16.	"21st Century Schizoid Man" (Live at Summit Studios, Denver,12 March 1972 – New Stereo and Quadraphonic 24/96)
17.	"Summit Going On" (Live at Summit Studios, Denver,12 March 1972 – New Stereo and Quadraphonic 24/96)
18.	"My Hobby" (Live at Summit Studios, Denver,12 March 1972 – New Stereo and Quadraphonic 24/96)
19.	"The Sailor's Tale" (Live at Summit Studios, Denver,12 March 1972 – New Stereo and Quadraphonic 24/96)
20.	"The Creator Has a Master Plan (including Summit And Something Else)" (Live at Summit Studios, Denver,12 March 1972 – New Stereo and Quadraphonic 24/96)
21.	"Schizoid Men 1" (Schizoid Men – Stereo 24/48)
22.	"Schizoid Men 2" (Schizoid Men – Stereo 24/48)	Fripp
23.	"Schizoid Men 3" (Schizoid Men – Stereo 24/48)
24.	"Schizoid Men 4" (Schizoid Men – Stereo 24/48)
25.	"Schizoid Men 5" (Schizoid Men – Stereo 24/48)
26.	"Schizoid Men 6" (Schizoid Men – Stereo 24/48)
27.	"Schizoid Men 7" (Schizoid Men – Stereo 24/48)
28.	"Schizoid Men 8" (Schizoid Men – Stereo 24/48)
29.	"Schizoid Men 9" (Schizoid Men – Stereo 24/48)
30.	"Schizoid Men 10" (Schizoid Men – Stereo 24/48)
31.	"Schizoid Men 11" (Schizoid Men – Stereo 24/48)
32.	"21st Century Schizoid Man" (from the DGM album, Ladies of the Road – Stereo 24/96 – Needledrop: Help 6 (Earthbound))
33.	"Peoria" (from the DGM album, Ladies of the Road – Stereo 24/96 – Needledrop: Help 6 (Earthbound))
34.	"The Sailor's Tale" (from the DGM album, Ladies of the Road – Stereo 24/96 – Needledrop: Help 6 (Earthbound))
35.	"Earthbound" (from the DGM album, Ladies of the Road – Stereo 24/96 – Needledrop: Help 6 (Earthbound))
36.	"Groon" (from the DGM album, Ladies of the Road – Stereo 24/96 – Needledrop: Help 6 (Earthbound))
37.	"Pictures of a City" (Live, 1972 – Soundboard Concerts – Stereo 24/96 – Unidentified 1972 Show No.1 (Note: Later identified as Santa Monica Civic Auditorium, Santa Monica, 19 March 1972.) – Incomplete recording)
38.	"Cirkus" (Live, 1972 – Soundboard Concerts – Stereo 24/96 – Unidentified 1972 Show No.1)
39.	"Ladies of the Road" (Live, 1972 – Soundboard Concerts – Stereo 24/96 – Unidentified 1972 Show No.1)
40.	"21st Century Schizoid Man" (Live, 1972 – Soundboard Concerts – Stereo 24/96 – Unidentified 1972 Show No.1)
41.	"RF Announcement" (Live, 1972 – Soundboard Concerts – Stereo 24/96 – Unidentified 1972 Show No.1)
42.	"The Letters" (Live, 1972 – Soundboard Concerts – Stereo 24/96 – Unidentified 1972 Show No.1)
43.	"Pictures of a City" (Live, 1972 – Soundboard Concerts – Stereo 24/96 – Unidentified 1972 Show No.2 – Incomplete recording)
44.	"Cirkus" (Live, 1972 – Soundboard Concerts – Stereo 24/96 – Unidentified 1972 Show No.2)
45.	"Ladies of the Road" (Live, 1972 – Soundboard Concerts – Stereo 24/96 – Unidentified 1972 Show No.2)
46.	"Formentera Lady: Improv Section" (Live, 1972 – Soundboard Concerts – Stereo 24/96 – Unidentified 1972 Show No.2)
47.	"The Sailor's Tale" (Live, 1972 – Soundboard Concerts – Stereo 24/96 – Unidentified 1972 Show No.2)
48.	"21st Century Schizoid Man" (Live, 1972 – Soundboard Concerts – Stereo 24/96 – Unidentified 1972 Show No.2)
49.	"Pictures of a City" (Live, 1972 – Soundboard Concerts – Stereo 24/96 – Wilmington, 11 February, Early Show)
50.	"Formentera Lady" (Live, 1972 – Soundboard Concerts – Stereo 24/96 – Wilmington, 11 February, Early Show)
51.	"The Sailor's Tale" (Live, 1972 – Soundboard Concerts – Stereo 24/96 – Wilmington, 11 February, Early Show)
52.	"Cirkus" (Live, 1972 – Soundboard Concerts – Stereo 24/96 – Wilmington, 11 February, Early Show)
53.	"RF Announcement" (Live, 1972 – Soundboard Concerts – Stereo 24/96 – Wilmington, 11 February, Early Show)
54.	"Ladies of the Road" (Live, 1972 – Soundboard Concerts – Stereo 24/96 – Wilmington, 11 February, Early Show)
55.	"Groon" (Live, 1972 – Soundboard Concerts – Stereo 24/96 – Wilmington, 11 February, Early Show)
56.	"21st Century Schizoid Man" (Live, 1972 – Soundboard Concerts – Stereo 24/96 – Wilmington, 11 February, Early Show)
57.	"Pictures of a City" (Live, 1972 – Soundboard Concerts – Stereo 24/96 – New York, 12 February, Early Show – Incomplete recording)
58.	"Formentera Lady" (Live, 1972 – Soundboard Concerts – Stereo 24/96 – New York, 12 February, Early Show)
59.	"The Sailor's Tale" (Live, 1972 – Soundboard Concerts – Stereo 24/96 – New York, 12 February, Early Show)
60.	"RF Announcement" (Live, 1972 – Soundboard Concerts – Stereo 24/96 – New York, 12 February, Early Show)
61.	"Cirkus" (Live, 1972 – Soundboard Concerts – Stereo 24/96 – New York, 12 February, Early Show)
62.	"Ladies of the Road" (Live, 1972 – Soundboard Concerts – Stereo 24/96 – New York, 12 February, Early Show)
63.	"Groon" (Live, 1972 – Soundboard Concerts – Stereo 24/96 – New York, 12 February, Early Show)
64.	"21st Century Schizoid Man" (Live, 1972 – Soundboard Concerts – Stereo 24/96 – New York, 12 February, Early Show)
65.	"Pictures of a City" (Live, 1972 – Soundboard Concerts – Stereo 24/96 – New York, 12 February, Late Show – Incomplete recording)
66.	"Formentera Lady" (Live, 1972 – Soundboard Concerts – Stereo 24/96 – New York, 12 February, Late Show)
67.	"The Sailor's Tale" (Live, 1972 – Soundboard Concerts – Stereo 24/96 – New York, 12 February, Late Show)
68.	"RF Announcement" (Live, 1972 – Soundboard Concerts – Stereo 24/96 – New York, 12 February, Late Show)
69.	"Cirkus" (Live, 1972 – Soundboard Concerts – Stereo 24/96 – New York, 12 February, Late Show)
70.	"RF Announcement" (Live, 1972 – Soundboard Concerts – Stereo 24/96 – New York, 12 February, Late Show)
71.	"Ladies of the Road" (Live, 1972 – Soundboard Concerts – Stereo 24/96 – New York, 12 February, Late Show)
72.	"Groon" (Live, 1972 – Soundboard Concerts – Stereo 24/96 – New York, 12 February, Late Show)
73.	"21st Century Schizoid Man" (Live, 1972 – Soundboard Concerts – Stereo 24/96 – New York, 12 February, Late Show)
74.	"Cadence and Cascade" (Live, 1972 – Soundboard Concerts – Stereo 24/96 – New York, 12 February, Late Show – Incomplete recording)
75.	"Cirkus" (Live, 1972 – Soundboard Concerts – Stereo 24/96 – Chicago, 17 February)
76.	"Groon" (Live, 1972 – Soundboard Concerts – Stereo 24/96 – Chicago, 17 February)
77.	"Pictures of a City" (Live, 1972 – Soundboard Concerts – Stereo 24/96 – Detroit, 18 February)
78.	"Formentera Lady" (Live, 1972 – Soundboard Concerts – Stereo 24/96 – Detroit, 18 February)
79.	"The Sailor's Tale" (Live, 1972 – Soundboard Concerts – Stereo 24/96 – Detroit, 18 February)
80.	"Cirkus" (Live, 1972 – Soundboard Concerts – Stereo 24/96 – Detroit, 18 February)
81.	"RF Announcement" (Live, 1972 – Soundboard Concerts – Stereo 24/96 – Detroit, 18 February)
82.	"Ladies of the Road" (Live, 1972 – Soundboard Concerts – Stereo 24/96 – Detroit, 18 February)
83.	"Groon" (Live, 1972 – Soundboard Concerts – Stereo 24/96 – Detroit, 18 February)
84.	"21st Century Schizoid Man" (Live, 1972 – Soundboard Concerts – Stereo 24/96 – Detroit, 18 February)
85.	"Pictures of a City" (Live, 1972 – Soundboard Concerts – Stereo 24/96 – Jacksonville, 26 February)
86.	"Cirkus" (Live, 1972 – Soundboard Concerts – Stereo 24/96 – Jacksonville, 26 February)
87.	"Ladies of the Road" (Live, 1972 – Soundboard Concerts – Stereo 24/96 – Jacksonville, 26 February)
88.	"Formentera Lady" (Live, 1972 – Soundboard Concerts – Stereo 24/96 – Jacksonville, 26 February)
89.	"The Sailor's Tale" (Live, 1972 – Soundboard Concerts – Stereo 24/96 – Jacksonville, 26 February)
90.	"21st Century Schizoid Man" (Live, 1972 – Soundboard Concerts – Stereo 24/96 – Jacksonville, 26 February)
91.	"Pictures of a City" (Live, 1972 – Soundboard Concerts – Stereo 24/96 – Orlando, 27 February)
92.	"Formentera Lady" (Live, 1972 – Soundboard Concerts – Stereo 24/96 – Orlando, 27 February)
93.	"The Sailor's Tale" (Live, 1972 – Soundboard Concerts – Stereo 24/96 – Orlando, 27 February)
94.	"Cirkus" (Live, 1972 – Soundboard Concerts – Stereo 24/96 – Orlando, 27 February)
95.	"Ladies of the Road" (Live, 1972 – Soundboard Concerts – Stereo 24/96 – Orlando, 27 February)
96.	"Groon" (Live, 1972 – Soundboard Concerts – Stereo 24/96 – Orlando, 27 February)
97.	"21st Century Schizoid Man" (Live, 1972 – Soundboard Concerts – Stereo 24/96 – Orlando, 27 February)
98.	"Earthbound" (Live, 1972 – Soundboard Concerts – Stereo 24/96 – Orlando, 27 February)
99.	"Cadence and Cascade" (Live, 1972 – Soundboard Concerts – Stereo 24/96 – Orlando, 27 February)
100.	"Pictures of a City" (Live, 1972 – Soundboard Concerts – Stereo 24/96 – Pittsburgh, 6 March)
101.	"Formentera Lady" (Live, 1972 – Soundboard Concerts – Stereo 24/96 – Pittsburgh, 6 March)
102.	"The Sailor's Tale" (Live, 1972 – Soundboard Concerts – Stereo 24/96 – Pittsburgh, 6 March)
103.	"Cirkus" (Live, 1972 – Soundboard Concerts – Stereo 24/96 – Pittsburgh, 6 March)
104.	"Ladies of the Road" (Live, 1972 – Soundboard Concerts – Stereo 24/96 – Pittsburgh, 6 March)
105.	"Groon" (Live, 1972 – Soundboard Concerts – Stereo 24/96 – Pittsburgh, 6 March)
106.	"21st Century Schizoid Man" (Live, 1972 – Soundboard Concerts – Stereo 24/96 – Pittsburgh, 6 March)
107.	"Improv 1" (Live, 1972 – Soundboard Concerts – Stereo 24/96 – Pittsburgh, 6 March)
108.	"Cadence and Cascade" (Live, 1972 – Soundboard Concerts – Stereo 24/96 – Pittsburgh, 6 March – Incomplete recording)
109.	"Pictures of a City" (Live, 1972 – Soundboard Concerts – Stereo 24/96 – Milwaukee, 8 March)
110.	"Formentera Lady" (Live, 1972 – Soundboard Concerts – Stereo 24/96 – Milwaukee, 8 March)
111.	"The Sailor's Tale" (Live, 1972 – Soundboard Concerts – Stereo 24/96 – Milwaukee, 8 March)
112.	"Cirkus" (Live, 1972 – Soundboard Concerts – Stereo 24/96 – Milwaukee, 8 March)
113.	"Ladies of the Road" (Live, 1972 – Soundboard Concerts – Stereo 24/96 – Milwaukee, 8 March)
114.	"Groon" (Live, 1972 – Soundboard Concerts – Stereo 24/96 – Milwaukee, 8 March – Incomplete recording)
115.	"Groon" (Live, 1972 – Soundboard Concerts – Stereo 24/96 – Milwaukee, 8 March – Incomplete recording)
116.	"21st Century Schizoid Man" (Live, 1972 – Soundboard Concerts – Stereo 24/96 – Milwaukee, 8 March – Incomplete recording)
117.	"21st Century Schizoid Man" (Live, 1972 – Soundboard Concerts – Stereo 24/96 – Milwaukee, 8 March)
118.	"Cadence and Cascade" (Live, 1972 – Soundboard Concerts – Stereo 24/96 – Milwaukee, 8 March)
119.	"Cirkus" (Live, 1972 – Soundboard Concerts – Stereo 24/96 – Peoria, 10 March – Incomplete recording)
120.	"Announcement" (Live, 1972 – Soundboard Concerts – Stereo 24/96 – Peoria, 10 March)
121.	"Ladies of the Road" (Live, 1972 – Soundboard Concerts – Stereo 24/96 – Peoria, 10 March)
122.	"Groon Peoria" (Live, 1972 – Soundboard Concerts – Stereo 24/96 – Peoria, 10 March – Incomplete recording)
123.	"21st Century Schizoid Man" (Live, 1972 – Soundboard Concerts – Stereo 24/96 – Peoria, 10 March – Incomplete recording)
124.	"Improv" (Live, 1972 – Soundboard Concerts – Stereo 24/96 – Peoria, 10 March – Incomplete recording)
125.	"Cadence and Cascade" (Live, 1972 – Soundboard Concerts – Stereo 24/96 – Peoria, 10 March)
126.	"Pictures of a City" (Live, 1972 – Soundboard Concerts – Stereo 24/96 – Indianapolis, 11 March – Incomplete recording)
127.	"The Sailor's Tale" (Live, 1972 – Soundboard Concerts – Stereo 24/96 – Indianapolis, 11 March)
128.	"Drum Solo" (Live, 1972 – Soundboard Concerts – Stereo 24/96 – Indianapolis, 11 March)
129.	"21st Century Schizoid Man" (Live, 1972 – Soundboard Concerts – Stereo 24/96 – Indianapolis, 11 March)
130.	"Formentera Lady" (Live, 1972 – Soundboard Concerts – Stereo 24/96 – Denver, 13 March – Incomplete recording)
131.	"The Sailor's Tale" (Live, 1972 – Soundboard Concerts – Stereo 24/96 – Denver, 13 March)
132.	"Ladies of the Road" (Live, 1972 – Soundboard Concerts – Stereo 24/96 – Denver, 13 March)
133.	"The Letters" (Live, 1972 – Soundboard Concerts – Stereo 24/96 – Denver, 13 March)
134.	"21st Century Schizoid Man" (Live, 1972 – Soundboard Concerts – Stereo 24/96 – Denver, 13 March)
135.	"Formentera Lady" (Live, 1972 – Soundboard Concerts – Stereo 24/96 – Denver, 14 March)
136.	"The Sailor's Tale" (Live, 1972 – Soundboard Concerts – Stereo 24/96 – Denver, 14 March)
137.	"Cirkus" (Live, 1972 – Soundboard Concerts – Stereo 24/96 – Denver, 14 March)
138.	"Ladies of the Road" (Live, 1972 – Soundboard Concerts – Stereo 24/96 – Denver, 14 March)
139.	"The Letters" (Live, 1972 – Soundboard Concerts – Stereo 24/96 – Denver, 14 March)
140.	"Improv" (Live, 1972 – Soundboard Concerts – Stereo 24/96 – Denver, 14 March)
141.	"21st Century Schizoid Man" (Live, 1972 – Soundboard Concerts – Stereo 24/96 – Denver, 14 March)
142.	"Cadence and Cascade" (Live, 1972 – Soundboard Concerts – Stereo 24/96 – Denver, 14 March)

Sailors' Tales, Disc 23: DVD disc 1 – Earthbound (1972 live) Extended – New sequence Stereo 24/48 – plus extras
No.	Title	Writer(s)	Length
1.	"21st Century Schizoid Man" (Wilmington, 11 February)
2.	"Peoria" (Peoria, 10 March)
3.	"The Sailor's Tale" (Jacksonville, 26 February)
4.	"Earthbound" (Orlando, 27 February)
5.	"Groon" (Wilmington, 11 February)
6.	"Pictures of a City" (Milwaukee, 8 March)
7.	"Formentera Lady" (Milwaukee, 8 March)
8.	"Cirkus" (Orlando, 27 February)
9.	"Ladies of the Road" (Orlando, 27 February)
10.	"The Letters" (Denver, 13 March)
11.	"The Sailor's Tale" (Jacksonville, 26 February [extended version])
12.	"Groon" (Peoria, 10 March [extended version])
13.	"Pictures of a City" (Live at Summit Studios, Denver, 12 March – New Stereo and Quadraphonic 24/48)
14.	"Cadence and Cascade" (Live at Summit Studios, Denver, 12 March – New Stereo and Quadraphonic 24/48)
15.	"Groon" (Live at Summit Studios, Denver, 12 March – New Stereo and Quadraphonic 24/48)
16.	"21st Century Schizoid Man" (Live at Summit Studios, Denver, 12 March – New Stereo and Quadraphonic 24/48)
17.	"Summit Going On" (Live at Summit Studios, Denver, 12 March – New Stereo and Quadraphonic 24/48)
18.	"My Hobby" (Live at Summit Studios, Denver, 12 March – New Stereo and Quadraphonic 24/48)
19.	"The Sailor's Tale" (Live at Summit Studios, Denver, 12 March – New Stereo and Quadraphonic 24/48)
20.	"The Creator Has a Master Plan (including Summit and Something Else)" (Live at Summit Studios, Denver, 12 March – New Stereo and Quadraphonic 24/48)
21.	"Schizoid Men 1" (Schizoid Men – Stereo 24/48)
22.	"Schizoid Men 2" (Schizoid Men – Stereo 24/48)	Fripp
23.	"Schizoid Men 3" (Schizoid Men – Stereo 24/48)
24.	"Schizoid Men 4" (Schizoid Men – Stereo 24/48)
25.	"Schizoid Men 5" (Schizoid Men – Stereo 24/48)
26.	"Schizoid Men 6" (Schizoid Men – Stereo 24/48)
27.	"Schizoid Men 7" (Schizoid Men – Stereo 24/48)
28.	"Schizoid Men 8" (Schizoid Men – Stereo 24/48)
29.	"Schizoid Men 9" (Schizoid Men – Stereo 24/48)
30.	"Schizoid Men 10" (Schizoid Men – Stereo 24/48)
31.	"Schizoid Men 11" (Schizoid Men – Stereo 24/48)
32.	"21st Century Schizoid Man" (from the DGM album, Ladies of the Road – Stereo 24/96 – Needledrop: Help 6 (Earthbound))
33.	"Peoria" (from the DGM album, Ladies of the Road – Stereo 24/96 – Needledrop: Help 6 (Earthbound))
34.	"The Sailor's Tale" (from the DGM album, Ladies of the Road – Stereo 24/96 – Needledrop: Help 6 (Earthbound))
35.	"Earthbound" (from the DGM album, Ladies of the Road – Stereo 24/96 – Needledrop: Help 6 (Earthbound))
36.	"Groon" (from the DGM album, Ladies of the Road – Stereo 24/96 – Needledrop: Help 6 (Earthbound))

Sailors' Tales, Disc 24: DVD disc 2 – King Crimson 1972 Live
No.	Title	Length
1.	"Pictures of a City" (Live, 1972 – Soundboard Concerts – Stereo 24/96 – Unidentified 1972 Show No.1 – Incomplete recording)
2.	"Cirkus" (Live, 1972 – Soundboard Concerts – Stereo 24/96 – Unidentified 1972 Show No.1)
3.	"Ladies of the Road" (Live, 1972 – Soundboard Concerts – Stereo 24/96 – Unidentified 1972 Show No.1)
4.	"21st Century Schizoid Man" (Live, 1972 – Soundboard Concerts – Stereo 24/96 – Unidentified 1972 Show No.1)
5.	"RF Announcement" (Live, 1972 – Soundboard Concerts – Stereo 24/96 – Unidentified 1972 Show No.1)
6.	"The Letters" (Live, 1972 – Soundboard Concerts – Stereo 24/96 – Unidentified 1972 Show No.1)
7.	"Pictures of a City" (Live, 1972 – Soundboard Concerts – Stereo 24/96 – Unidentified 1972 Show No.2 – Incomplete recording)
8.	"Cirkus" (Live, 1972 – Soundboard Concerts – Stereo 24/96 – Unidentified 1972 Show No.2)
9.	"Ladies of the Road" (Live, 1972 – Soundboard Concerts – Stereo 24/96 – Unidentified 1972 Show No.2)
10.	"Formentera Lady: Improv Section" (Live, 1972 – Soundboard Concerts – Stereo 24/96 – Unidentified 1972 Show No.2)
11.	"The Sailor's Tale" (Live, 1972 – Soundboard Concerts – Stereo 24/96 – Unidentified 1972 Show No.2)
12.	"21st Century Schizoid Man" (Live, 1972 – Soundboard Concerts – Stereo 24/96 – Unidentified 1972 Show No.2)
13.	"Pictures of a City" (Live, 1972 – Soundboard Concerts – Stereo 24/96 – New York, 12 February, Early Show – Incomplete recording)
14.	"Formentera Lady" (Live, 1972 – Soundboard Concerts – Stereo 24/96 – New York, 12 February, Early Show)
15.	"The Sailor's Tale" (Live, 1972 – Soundboard Concerts – Stereo 24/96 – New York, 12 February, Early Show)
16.	"RF Announcement" (Live, 1972 – Soundboard Concerts – Stereo 24/96 – New York, 12 February, Early Show)
17.	"Cirkus" (Live, 1972 – Soundboard Concerts – Stereo 24/96 – New York, 12 February, Early Show)
18.	"Ladies of the Road" (Live, 1972 – Soundboard Concerts – Stereo 24/96 – New York, 12 February, Early Show)
19.	"Groon" (Live, 1972 – Soundboard Concerts – Stereo 24/96 – New York, 12 February, Early Show)
20.	"21st Century Schizoid Man" (Live, 1972 – Soundboard Concerts – Stereo 24/96 – New York, 12 February, Early Show)
21.	"Pictures of a City" (Live, 1972 – Soundboard Concerts – Stereo 24/96 – New York, 12 February, Late Show – Incomplete recording)
22.	"Formentera Lady" (Live, 1972 – Soundboard Concerts – Stereo 24/96 – New York, 12 February, Late Show)
23.	"The Sailor's Tale" (Live, 1972 – Soundboard Concerts – Stereo 24/96 – New York, 12 February, Late Show)
24.	"RF Announcement" (Live, 1972 – Soundboard Concerts – Stereo 24/96 – New York, 12 February, Late Show)
25.	"Cirkus" (Live, 1972 – Soundboard Concerts – Stereo 24/96 – New York, 12 February, Late Show)
26.	"RF Announcement" (Live, 1972 – Soundboard Concerts – Stereo 24/96 – New York, 12 February, Late Show)
27.	"Ladies of the Road" (Live, 1972 – Soundboard Concerts – Stereo 24/96 – New York, 12 February, Late Show)
28.	"Groon" (Live, 1972 – Soundboard Concerts – Stereo 24/96 – New York, 12 February, Late Show)
29.	"21st Century Schizoid Man" (Live, 1972 – Soundboard Concerts – Stereo 24/96 – New York, 12 February, Late Show)
30.	"Cadence and Cascade" (Live, 1972 – Soundboard Concerts – Stereo 24/96 – New York, 12 February, Late Show – Incomplete recording)

Sailors' Tales, Disc 25: 1971/1972 Auditions/Rehearsals from reel-to-reel tapes. Audio restored at DGM by David Singleton & Alex R. Mundy – Previously unreleased
No.	Title	Length
1.	"Blow No. 1" (Rehearsals for 1971/72 band line-up)	45:09
2.	"Blow No. 2" (Rehearsals for 1971/72 band line-up)	27:38

Sailors' Tales, Disc 26: Auditions/Rehearsals & Unidentified 1972 Show No.1 – Previously unreleased
No.	Title	Writer(s)	Length
1.	"Blow No. 3" (from reel-to-reel tape)		24:23
2.	"Pictures of a City" (from a soundboard cassette recording – Incomplete recording)	Fripp, Sinfield	5:28
3.	"Cirkus" (from a soundboard cassette recording)	Fripp, Sinfield	8:57
4.	"Ladies of the Road" (from a soundboard cassette recording)	Fripp, Sinfield	6:07
5.	"21st Century Schizoid Man" (from a soundboard cassette recording)	Fripp, McDonald, Lake, Giles, Sinfield	11:28
6.	"RF Announcement" (from a soundboard cassette recording)		1:36
7.	"The Letters" (from a soundboard cassette recording)	Fripp, Sinfield	9:06

Sailors' Tales, Disc 27: Unidentified 1972 Show No. 2 – Previously unreleased
No.	Title	Writer(s)	Length
1.	"Pictures of a City" (from a soundboard cassette recording – Incomplete recording)	Fripp, Sinfield	7:41
2.	"Cirkus" (from a soundboard cassette recording)	Fripp, Sinfield	9:31
3.	"Ladies of the Road" (from a soundboard cassette recording)	Fripp, Sinfield	6:11
4.	"Formentera Lady: Improv Section" (from a soundboard cassette recording)	Fripp, Collins, Burrell, Wallace, Sinfield	7:02
5.	"The Sailor's Tale" (from a soundboard cassette recording)	Fripp	20:22
6.	"21st Century Schizoid Man" (from a soundboard cassette recording)	Fripp, McDonald, Lake, Giles, Sinfield	10:50

Bonus Downloadable Concert: Live at Hyde Park, London, 4 September 1971
No.	Title	Writer(s)	Length
1.	"Formentera Lady" (from a bootleg cassette recording)	Fripp, Sinfield	5:07
2.	"The Sailor's Tale" (from a bootleg cassette recording)	Fripp	7:15
3.	"Pictures of a City" (from a bootleg cassette recording)	Fripp, Sinfield	9:03
4.	"Lady of the Dancing Water" (from a bootleg cassette recording)	Fripp, Sinfield	2:50
5.	"Cadence and Cascade" (from a bootleg cassette recording)	Fripp, Sinfield	4:13
6.	"21st Century Schizoid Man" (from a bootleg cassette recording)	Fripp, McDonald, Lake, Giles, Sinfield	8:58

== Personnel ==
For the studio albums In the Wake of Poseidon, Lizard and Islands, see the individual articles.

King Crimson live 1971-72

- Robert Fripp – electric guitar, Mellotron, Hohner Pianet
- Mel Collins – saxophone, flute, Mellotron
- Boz Burrell – bass guitar, lead vocals
- Ian Wallace – drums, percussion, backing vocals
- Peter Sinfield – live sound mixing, VCS3, stage lighting (1971)

Additional personnel

- Hunter MacDonald & John Robson – live sound mixing, VCS3, stage lighting (1972)
