= The Island, New Jersey =

The Island, New Jersey may refer to the following places in New Jersey:

- The Island section of Hilltop, Jersey City
- The Island, Trenton, New Jersey
