= Ernest Milton (actor) =

American-British actor (1890–1974)

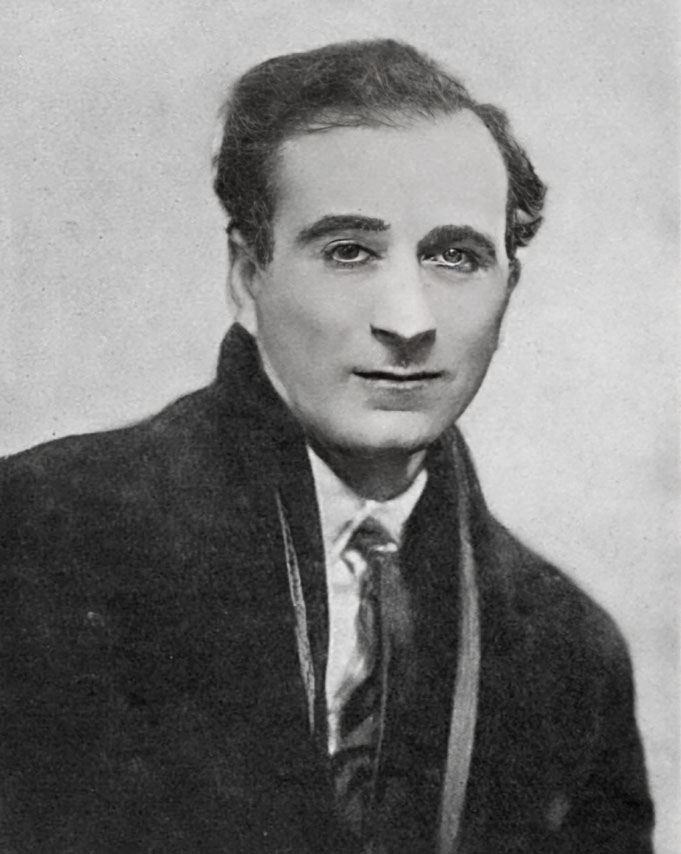
Milton around 1928

Ernest Gianello Milton (10 January 1890 – 24 July 1974) was an American-born, naturalised British actor, who was prominent in the 1920s through to the 1940s for his roles in London with the Old Vic Theatre and on the West End stage. In his day, he was considered an outstanding interpreter of William Shakespeare's Hamlet, playing the role several times in the 1920s.

== Early life ==
Milton was born in San Francisco on 10 January 1890.

== Career ==
Milton joined the Old Vic in 1918. He later acted with the Royal Shakespeare Company from 1962. Unlike many of his peers, he made very few feature film appearances. A notable supporting role was Robespierre in the 1934 Leslie Howard comedy drama The Scarlet Pimpernel. He voiced the White Rabbit in the 1949 film version of Alice in Wonderland. He also had supporting roles in The Foreman Went to France (1942) and Cat Girl (1957).

He was a pioneer in Shakespeare on BBC television. His first appearance was in 1937 as Richard, Duke of Gloucester in the 'wooing scene' from Richard III and he took the title role in the 1938 live production of Julius Caesar set in Fascist Italy. This was the first full-length production of a Shakespeare play on television. Later he repeated on television his stage role in Luigi Pirandello's Henry IV . Having starred in the original 1929 West End production of Patrick Hamilton's Rope, he played the role again in a 1939 BBC TV adaptation.

== Personal life ==
Milton was married to writer Naomi Royde-Smith from 1926 until her death in 1964. He died in London on 24 July 1974, at the age of 84.
