= Island Records (disambiguation) =

Island Records may refer to the following music industry record labels:

- Island Records founded in Jamaica in 1959, and its subsidiary labels:
  - Island Records Australia
  - Island Masters
  - Island Reggae Greats
  - Island Blue Records
- The Island Def Jam Music Group, the name of the Island Records group after its merger with Def Jam Music

== See also ==
- Island (disambiguation)
- List of former Island Records artists
