= Islands (King Crimson song) =

Song by King Crimson

from the album Islands
- Released: 3 December 1971
- Recorded: October 1971
- Genre: Progressive rock, jazz rock, chamber music
- Length: 11:51 (full version); 9:20 (without the hidden track)
- Label: Island; Atlantic; Polydor; E.G. Virgin
- Composer: Robert Fripp
- Lyricist: Peter Sinfield
- Producer: King Crimson

Islands track listing
- 1. "Formentera Lady"; 2. "Sailor's Tale"; 3. "The Letters"; 4. "Ladies of the Road"; 5. "Prelude: Song of the Gulls"; 6. "Islands"

"Islands" is the title and closing track of the album of the same name by the progressive rock band, King Crimson, released in 1971. The song's pastoral, mellow, and quiet feeling (the lyrics talk of a peaceful island) distinguish it from the album's first four tracks. The song was played live only a few times in 1971, with Collins using a regular concert flute, and Fripp playing guitar in place of Mark Charig's cornet.

"Islands" was revived on the band's 2017 North American summer tour with the Radical Action lineup of Fripp, Collins (with bass flute, and covering the oboe and cornet parts on soprano saxophone), bassist Tony Levin, guitarist/vocalist Jakko Jakszyk, keyboardist Bill Rieflin (playing the harmonium part), drummers Pat Mastelotto and Gavin Harrison, and drummer/keyboardist Jeremy Stacey (on piano). The band has continued to perform the track live in subsequent tours.

== Personnel ==
- Robert Fripp – guitar, harmonium, Mellotron
- Mel Collins – bass flute
- Boz Burrell – vocals
- Ian Wallace – drums, percussion
- Peter Sinfield – lyrics

with:

- Keith Tippett – piano
- Mark Charig – cornet
- Robin Miller – oboe
