= Earthbound (King Crimson album) =

Live album by King Crimson
- Released: 9 June 1972
- Recorded: 11 February – 10 March 1972
- Genres: Progressive rock; jazz fusion; lo-fi music
- Length: 46:38
- Labels: Island; Polydor; E.G.; Virgin
- Producer: Robert Fripp

King Crimson chronology
Islands (1971)	Earthbound (1972)	Larks' Tongues in Aspic (1973)

Earthbound is a live album by English progressive rock band King Crimson, released in June 1972 as a budget record shortly after the line-up that recorded it had broken up. It contains the band's first official live release of their signature song "21st Century Schizoid Man", and an extended live version of their 1970 non-LP B-side song "Groon". It also contains two improvised tracks with scat vocals from Boz Burrell.

The album's sound quality is poor, due to being recorded onto cassette tape (a low-fidelity recording medium, even by 1972 standards) by live sound engineer Hunter MacDonald. The liner notes to the original LP cover and recent CD reissues of the album state that it was "captured live on an Ampex stereo cassette fed from a Kelsey Morris custom built mixer ... in the rain from the back of a Volkswagen truck." Atlantic Records, the original distributor for King Crimson in the United States and Canada, declined to release Earthbound because of its poor sound. Because of the origins of the masters, the sound could not be significantly improved on later CD reissues of the album.

An expanded CD-DVD version of the album was released on 13 November 2017. The CD is expanded to eight tracks, whereas the DVD features hi-res audio of the album along with much additional audio material including a live radio session in surround sound.

== Content ==
In his book A New Day Yesterday: UK Progressive Rock & the 70s (2020), Mike Barnes describes Earthbound as a "rather ropey sounding" document of the harder-edged performances that King Crimson played on their US tour subsequent to Islands (1971). Fripp uses the wah-wah pedal on Earthbound, despite otherwise not using the effect because – as he said in a 1974 interview – it "bores [him] intensely" if used conventionally. "Earthbound" (also known as "Orlando") and "Peoria" are essentially jams centred on two chords. On "Groon", Ian Wallace's drum kit is processed through a EMS VCS 3 synthesiser operated from the mixing desk by live sound engineer Hunter MacDonald, an effect that Barnes opines "must have sounded amazingly new in 1971, [even if it] now comes over as something very much of its time."

== Release ==
Released on 9 June 1972, Earthbound was priced at the low cost of £1.35. Fripp said: "It didn't cost us very much to make, so it seems reasonable it shouldn't cost anybody else much to listen to. It's a very earthbound album, it has a lot of energy and a lot of vitality. It's not very spiritual, not like the first Crimson album which was magic, it reflects exactly where the band was at during the American tour." Fripp commented that Earthbound is "on a completely opposite plain" from the Walli Elmlark album he was working on by the time the King Crimson album saw release, but added "I don't have any difficulty moving from one to the other — it's a question of balance. One can't produce an earthbound King Crimson album and remain on a particularly esoteric level." At one point, it was the seventh best-selling album in Britain, according to the Sounds chart. The album reached No. 24 on the Italian charts in September 1972.

In a 1974 Trouser Press interview, Fripp said that "Earthbound wasn't King Crimson", deeming it the band's "own bootleg" and adding that it was released "to show why the band broke up". Ira Robbins of the magazine commented that it "showed what, maybe, American touring was like" and highlighted it sounding like "an awful bootleg". In 1975, Fripp repeated the claim that "Earthbound isn't a Crimson album". In 2002, Earthbound was released on CD for the first time, alongside the subsequent live record USA (1975).

== Legacy ==
Professional ratings
Review scores
Source	Rating
Allmusic	2/5 stars
BBC Online	favourable
Encyclopedia of Popular Music	2/5 stars
The Great Rock Discography	4/10
The Rolling Stone Album Guide	2/5 stars

In The Rough Guide to Rock (2003), Chris Dinsdale writes that Earthbound "distinguished itself only by being one of the most poorly recorded live albums ever." The Rolling Stone Album Guide (2004) names it a "mediocre live album" that, as a representation of this lineup of King Crimson in concert, had since been supplanted by the "much-superior" Ladies of the Road (2002). Jon Young of Trouser Press calls it "wretchedly unlistenable", while Chris Salewicz of Let It Rock quips: "One of the titles on Earthbound is 'Groon'. Replace the second vowel with an 'a' and the album is summed up."

More favourably, Chris Jones of BBC Online named Earthbound perhaps King Crimson's most atypical album. Noting the infamy of its "utterly non-digital genesis" as a cassette-recorded album, Jones believes that "its 'official bootleg' ambience sits strangely in the canon of a band infamous for their sonic precision. The truth is that at this point Fripp had hooked up with a bunch of musicians who, as he once put it, loved to 'blow'. Improvisation, always a key part of Crimson's modus operandi, here becomes 'jamming'." Jones believes that "Peoria" is the closest King Crimson ever got to funk, chiefly due to Collins' sax and Burrell's scat singing, and considers "Groon" to be "one of the most adventurous things [the band] ever attempted". Jones considers the overall album to be "a snapshot of a touring band primarily having fun."

Lindsay Planer of AllMusic believes that what the album lacks in fidelity is "more than compensated for with raw, unrelenting energy and magnetic musicianship." Planer adds that the "quartet's strength as improvisational members of a cohesive central unit are amply displayed throughout every sonic twist and turn.". Dan Nooger of The Village Voice recommends the album to those who are interested in hearing a "goodly portion" of the tour it was recorded on, in which King Crimson "rewarded us with furious pure music of almost unbearable intensity." Discoveries writer Chris Nickson writes that on Earthbound, "King Crimson had certainly gone for the physical", but believed that its cheap price was justified "given its appalling sound." Commenting on the music, Nickson commented: "It had its moments, especially on the truly apocalyptic take on '21st Century Schizoid Man,' but overall [it exhibits] a much funkier, earthier departure from Crimson's flights of fancy."

In a 1997 interview, noise artist Merzbow credited Earthbound as an influence, and covered some of its songs without vocals in what he called "brutal arrangements". He has since named it an early inspiration, and in 1999 said that Earthbound "still [sounds] stimulating even today. It is a great Noise album. When I first heard it, it sounded just incredible. You could say that album is a way-out great hard rock album as well." In a 2014 list for The Quietus, Mika Vainio from the group Pan Sonic named Earthbound among his thirteen favourite albums, crediting it for helping him discover a wealth of jazz and progressive rock. Vainio adds that while the album is "famous for bad sound quality", it works for the album fantastically, adding that "the sound quality really introduced me to the beauty of distortion. The recording quality is a really important part of the record. The performances are really great also."

== Track listing ==
Side one
No.	Title	Writer(s)	Recorded	Length
1.	"21st Century Schizoid Man" (including "Mirrors")	Fripp, McDonald, Lake, Giles, Sinfield	The Armoury, Wilmington, Delaware, United States, 11 February 1972 (late show)	11:45
2.	"Peoria"	Fripp, Collins, Burrell, Wallace	The Barn, Peoria, Illinois, United States, 10 March 1972	7:30
3.	"Sailor's Tale" (instrumental)	Fripp	The Baseball Park, Jacksonville, Florida, United States, 26 February 1972	4:45

Side two
No.	Title	Writer(s)	Notes	Length
1.	"Earthbound"	Fripp, Collins, Burrell, Wallace	The Kemp Coliseum, Orlando, Florida, United States, 27 February 1972	6:08
2.	"Groon" (instrumental)	Fripp	The Armoury, Wilmington, Delaware, United States, 11 February 1972 (late show)	15:30

== Personnel ==
King Crimson

- Robert Fripp – electric guitar, Mellotron, Hohner Pianet (Fripp's keyboards only feature on expanded versions of the album)
- Mel Collins – alto, tenor and baritone saxophone, Mellotron
- Boz Burrell – bass guitar, lead vocals
- Ian Wallace – drums, percussion, backing vocals

Additional personnel

- Hunter MacDonald – live sound mixing (1–5), VCS3 (1, 5)
- John Robson – live sound mixing (1, 5)
