= Islands (King Crimson album) =

Studio album by King Crimson
- Released: 3 December 1971
- Recorded: 22 July – 3 October 1971
- Studios: Island (London); Command (London)
- Genres: Progressive rock; jazz fusion; jazz-rock
- Length: 43:49
- Labels: Island; Atlantic
- Producer: King Crimson

King Crimson chronology
Lizard (1970)	Islands (1971)	Earthbound (1972)

King Crimson studio chronology
Lizard (1970)	Islands (1971)	Larks' Tongues in Aspic (1973)

Islands is the fourth studio album by English progressive rock band King Crimson, released on 3 December 1971 by Island Records in the United Kingdom, and in January 1972 by Atlantic Records in the United States and Canada. Islands is the only studio album to feature the line-up of Robert Fripp, Peter Sinfield, Mel Collins, Boz Burrell and Ian Wallace. Of these five members, only Fripp would still be in the band by the time of their next studio album, 1973's Larks' Tongues in Aspic.

Like its predecessor, Islands incorporates elements of jazz improvisation. The album reached number 30 in the UK Albums Chart. It received a mixed response from critics and fans.

== Background and release history ==
Sinfield was fired by Fripp following Islands, after what the latter musician viewed as a year and a half of increasing hostility. While Sinfield believed creative tensions were essential for the creativity of the band, he has since opined that his suggestions on the band's future being so unlike Fripp's sowed the seeds of the discontent, saying: "I think the famous 'big' problems really occurred leading up to Islands, where I musically wanted to find a softer, Miles Davis-with-vocals sexy package." Over time, Sinfield has been quoted as referring to the album as "my Islands", an assertion denied by Fripp who has said: "I'm not sure why Peter Sinfield would consider Islands to be his album, although it became clear at the time that Peter was increasingly using KC as a vehicle for his personal ambitions, rather than a joint/group undertaking. [...] But realistically, how was Islands Peter's album? Peter didn't compose or play music."

The album was re-released in 2010 as the fifth release in King Crimson's 40th Anniversary series, featuring new stereo and 5.1 surround mixes by Steven Wilson and Robert Fripp, Sid Smith sleeve notes and extra tracks and alternative versions. The DVD-A presents a 5.1 surround sound mix by Wilson, a hi-res stereo version of the 2010 mix, a hi-res stereo version of the original album mix taken from the 30th anniversary master source and previously unreleased material, including studio takes mixed from the original recording sessions.

== Music and lyrics ==
Musically, the album expands on the improvisational jazz leanings of King Crimson's previous album, Lizard.

The harmonic basis for the tune "The Letters" is derived from the Giles, Giles and Fripp song "Why Don't You Just Drop In", available on The Brondesbury Tapes compilation. The bridge section is also taken from the King Crimson version of the song, performed by the original line-up, titled simply "Drop In" and later released on the live album Epitaph.

The lyrics to "Ladies of the Road" are a series of male sexual fantasies revolving around "girls of the road", i.e. groupies. Lyricist Peter Sinfield later commented on the song: "... everybody writes at least one groupie song. We shouldn't. But we do. It is the ultimate sexist lyric of all time. I couldn't imagine anyone taking it too seriously, because in those days you were still able to say things like 'my lady' with a capital M and a capital L." [emphasis in original]

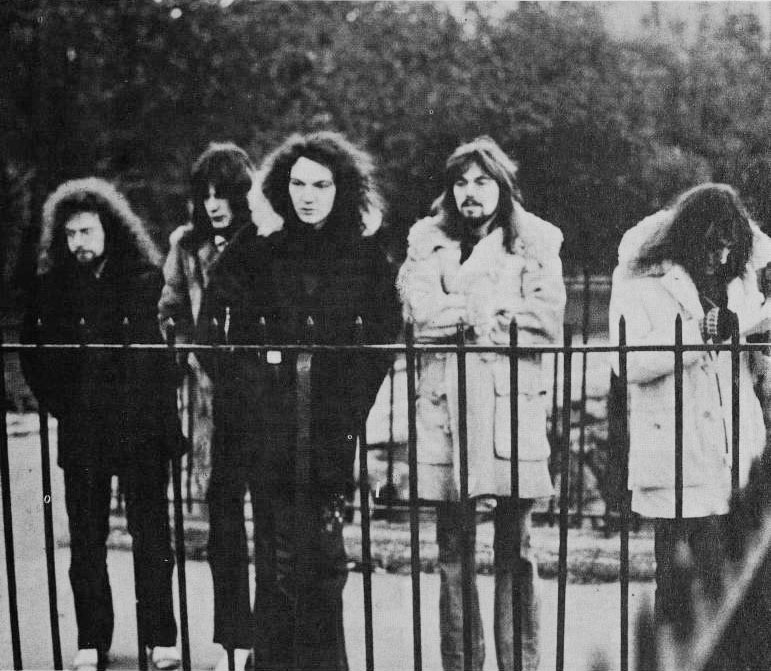
King Crimson in 1971. From left: Fripp, Collins, Wallace, Burrell, Sinfield

The original basis for the song "Prelude: Song of the Gulls" is derived from the Giles, Giles and Fripp song "Suite No. 1".

The first vinyl release of the album features a hidden track. At the end of side two there is a recording of studio chatter followed by Robert Fripp saying, among other things, "...What we're going to do, umm... do it twice more, once with the oboe, once without it, and then... we finish." This was included on the initial CD release but was accidentally left off some Japanese vinyl editions and the first pressings of the 1989 Definitive Edition CD remaster. It was restored on all subsequent reissues, and has been used as "walk on" music for all shows starting in 2014.

== Artwork ==
The original cover used in the United Kingdom and most other countries depicts a photograph of the Trifid Nebula in Sagittarius taken by the Carnegie Institution for Science. No text is featured on the front or back cover. The original United States and Canadian album cover (as released by Atlantic) was the off-white Peter Sinfield painting - with coloured "islands" - which featured on the internal gatefold in the rest of the world. When the King Crimson catalogue was re-issued, the "Trifid Nebula" cover was standardised worldwide; initial CD releases added the band name & album title to the front cover and a track list to the back, while the 30th anniversary remaster moves the front cover's text to the rear alongside the tracklist.

== Critical reception ==
Professional ratings
Review scores
Source	Rating
All About Jazz	5/5 stars
AllMusic	2.5/5 stars
Christgau's Record Guide	C
DownBeat	3.5/5 stars
Encyclopedia of Popular Music	2/5 stars
The Great Rock Discography	7/10
Mojo	4/5 stars
MusicHound	2/5 stars
Rolling Stone	mixed
The Rolling Stone Album Guide	1.5/5 stars
Sputnikmusic	4/5 stars

Retrospective reviews have been mixed, with critics generally praising the band's performances while finding the compositions and album structure aimless. AllMusic called it "the weakest Crimson studio album from their first era" that "is only a real disappointment in relation to the extraordinarily high quality of the group's earlier efforts." Conversely, All About Jazz described the album as a "well-conceived, tremendously executed and perfectly sequenced collection", and complimented Fripp's use of "a more sophisticated jazz vernacular" in a rock context.

In The Rough Guide to Rock (2003), Chris Dinsdale wrote that, despite being "a little directionless", Islands advances the jazz-rock fusion that King Crimson last explored on side two of Lizard (1970), and comments that "Sailor's Tale" is a "masterful instrumental" that ranks among Fripp's finest moments. In Christgau's Record Guide (1981), however, Robert Christgau criticised the album and quipped: "When I feel the need for contemporary chamber music or sexist japes, jazz libre or vers ordinaire, I'll go to the source(s)." A contributor to The New Rolling Stone Album Guide (2004) writes that the songs on Islands rank among King Crimson's most pretentious, with the exception of "Ladies of the Road", which "sets its groupie-adoration lyric to a lean, edgy blues."

According to authors Paul Hegarty and Martin Halliwell, Islands is "very much dominated by a stately mood development", especially on "Formentera Lady" and the title track, a development of the Miles Davis-style use of tone first found on "Bolero – The Peacock's Tale" from Lizard. In particular, "Formentera Lady" is described by writer Sid Smith as being reminiscent of the "modal explorations of Miles Davis' 'Shhh/Peaceful' on In a Silent Way." In his book A New Day Yesterday: UK Progressive Rock & the 70s (2020), Mike Barnes describes Islands as "another oddity, encompassing sleazy R&B, pastoralia and pseudo-baroque", and deems it "generally more direct than Lizards", despite expansive moments like "Formentera Lady". Martin C. Strong pinpoints Islands as the third in a four-album run from 1970 to 1973 in which King Crimson moved into avant-jazz territory.

== Track listing ==
All lyrics are written by Peter Sinfield; all music is composed by Robert Fripp.

Side one
No.	Title	Length
1.	"Formentera Lady"	10:18
2.	"Sailor's Tale" (instrumental)	7:29
3.	"The Letters"	4:28

Side two
No.	Title	Length
1.	"Ladies of the Road"	5:31
2.	"Prelude: Song of the Gulls" (instrumental)	4:14
3.	"Islands"	11:51

Note: A hidden track appears at the end of "Islands" following a minute of silence. The track is an excerpt from a studio session for the song "Prelude: Song of the Gulls". It features the sound of the ensemble tuning their instruments alongside Robert Fripp talking in the studio.

== Personnel ==
King Crimson

- Robert Fripp – electric guitar, acoustic guitar (1, 3), Mellotron (2, 6), Hohner Pianet (4), pedal harmonium (6), devices, production
- Mel Collins – saxophones, flute, bass flute (6), backing vocals (4), production
- Boz Burrell – bass guitar, lead vocals, production
- Ian Wallace – drums, percussion, backing and co-lead vocals (4), production
- Peter Sinfield – lyrics, VCS3 (2, 3), cover design and painting, production

Additional personnel

- Keith Tippett – piano (1, 6)
- Paulina Lucas – soprano vocals (1)
- Robin Miller – oboe (5)
- Mark Charig – cornet (6)
- Harry Miller – double bass (1)
- Wilf Gibson – violin, string orchestra leader (1, 5, 6 (hidden track only)) (uncredited)
- Uncredited musicians – strings (1, 5, 6 (hidden track only))
- Andy Hendrikson – recording engineer
- Vick & Mike – equipment
- Robert Ellis – band photography
- The Institute of Technology and Carnegie Institution of Washington – cover photographs

== Charts ==
Chart (1971–72)	Peak position
Australian Albums (Kent Music Report)	49
Canada Top Albums/CDs (RPM)	52
Finnish Albums (The Official Finnish Charts)	21
German Albums (Offizielle Top 100)	35
Italian Albums (Musica e Dischi)	21
Japanese Albums (Oricon)	61
UK Albums (Official Charts)	30
US Billboard 200	76
