= The Island, Trenton, New Jersey =

Populated place in Mercer County, New Jersey, US

The Island
- Neighborhood of Trenton
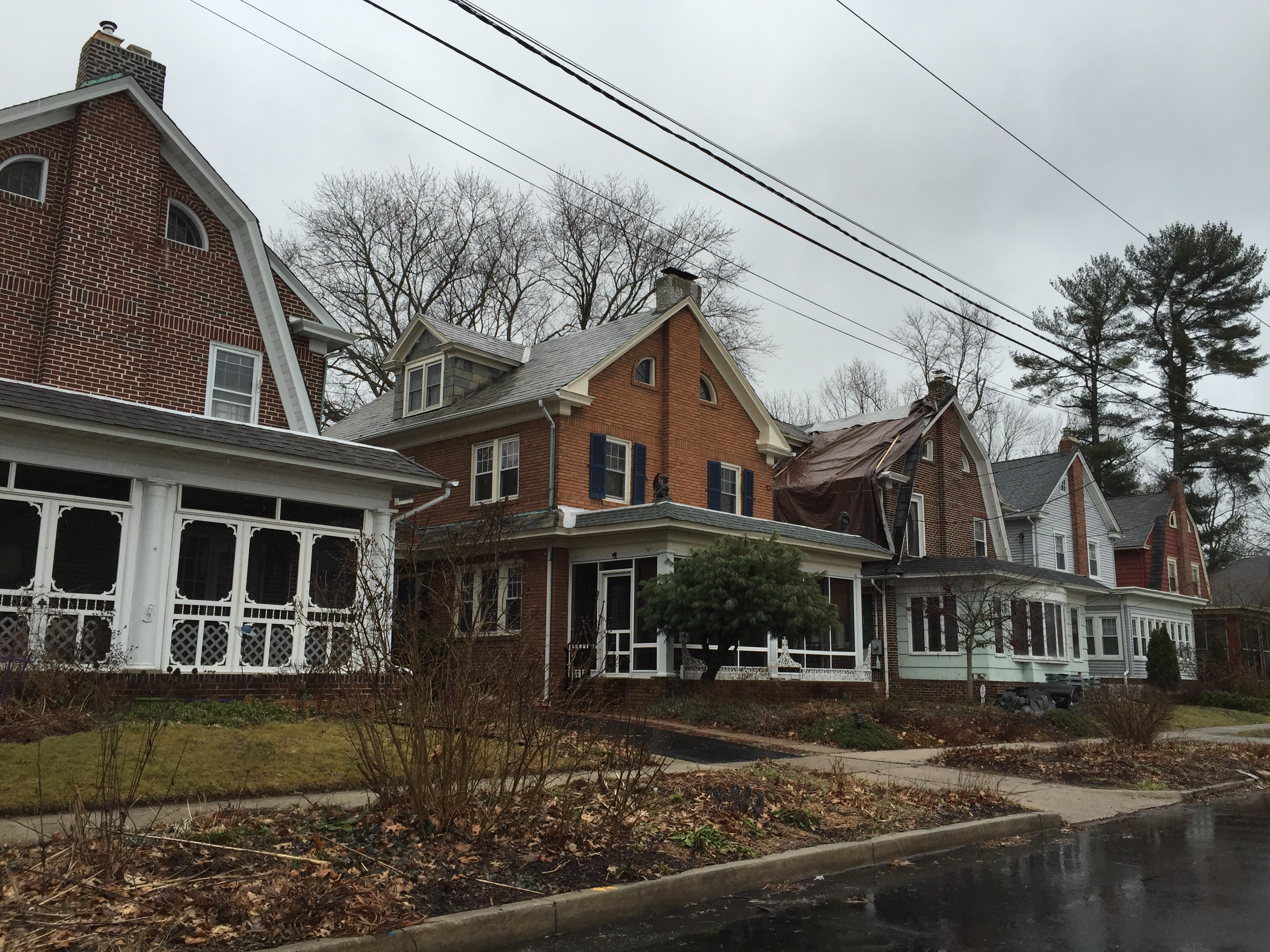
- Homes along Riverside Drive in The Island

- Location of The Island in Mercer County Inset: Location of county within the state of New Jersey The Island (New Jersey) The Island (the United States)
- Coordinates: 40°14′09″N 74°48′09″W
- Country: United States
- State: New Jersey
- County: Mercer
- City: Trenton

The Island is a neighborhood in the city of Trenton in Mercer County, in the U.S. state of New Jersey. It is primarily a residential neighborhood consisting of detached, single-family homes and semi-attached (twin) residences built in the 1920s. The name is derived from it formerly being located on a man-made island bounded on the south and west by the Delaware River and on the north and east by the Trenton Water Power Canal. The canal was filled in to provide space for present-day Route 29 during the 1950s.
