= Sarah Singleton =

British journalist and author

Sarah Singleton is a British journalist and author of adult and young adult fiction. She received the Booktrust Teenage Prize for her novel Century in 2005.

== Biography ==
Singleton was born in Thornbury in 1966, and was educated at the University of Nottingham in England. She has travelled in Europe, India and Nepal. She has two daughters, Fuchsia and Poppy.

She worked as a reporter for local weekly newspapers, including the Wiltshire Gazette & Herald, before becoming a writer and freelance journalist in 2007. Her novella In The Mirror (Enigmatic Novellas #4) was reprinted by Cosmos Books in 2001. Her first adult novel, The Crow Maiden, was published by Cosmos in 2000 and short-listed for the IAFA Crawford Award. Singleton's short stories have been published in magazines and anthologies, including Black Static, QWF magazine, Enigmatic Tales and Interzone.

== Bibliography ==
- In the Mirror (1999)
- The Crow Maiden (2000)
- Century (2005)
- Heretic (2006) (US title: Out of the Shadows)
- Sacrifice (2007)
- The Amethyst Child (2008)
- The Poison Garden (2009)
- The Island (2010)
- The Stranger (2011) (a sequel to The Island)
- Dark Storm (2012)
