= Naomi Royde-Smith =

British writer (1875–1964)

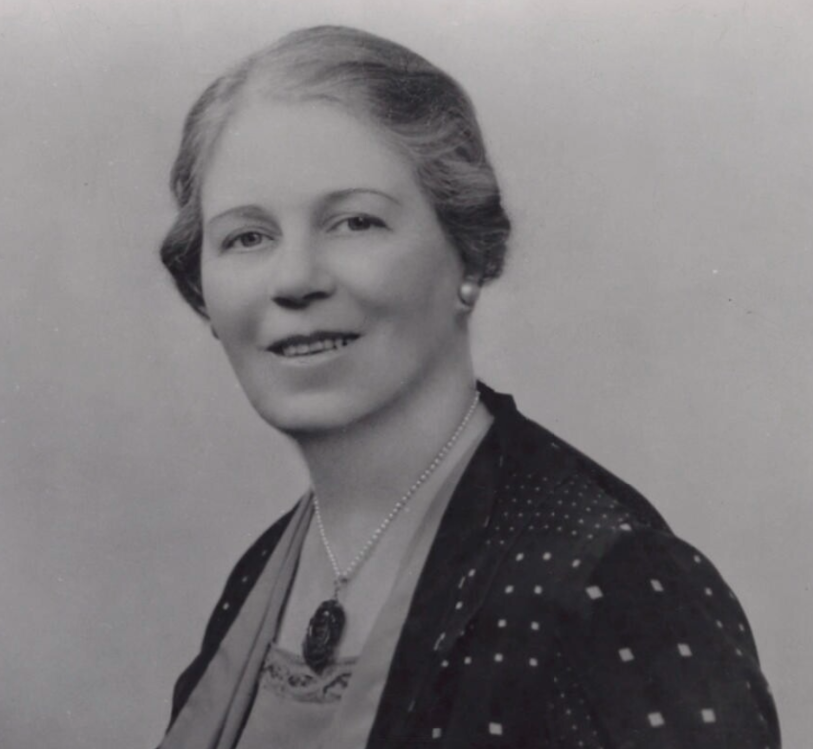
Naomi Gwladys Royde-Smith, 1933 by Elwin Neame Ltd

Naomi Royde-Smith (1875–1964) was a British writer who published nearly four dozen novels, biographies, and plays. She was the first woman literary editor of the Westminster Gazette and in that capacity published the early work of Rupert Brooke, Graham Greene, Elizabeth Bowen, Rose Macaulay and others.

== Early life and education ==
Naomi Gwladys Royde-Smith was born in Halifax, Yorkshire, on 30 April 1875. She was the oldest child of Michael Holroyd Smith, an electrical engineer, and Anne (Williams) Holroyd Smith. The painter Matthew Smith was a cousin, and she had five sisters and two brothers. The family moved to London and all eight of the siblings adopted the hyphenated surname Royde-Smith. Naomi was educated at Clapham High School and at a private finishing school in Switzerland.

== Literary career ==
On leaving school, Royde-Smith moved to Chelsea and began to write for the Westminster Gazette (also known as the Saturday Westminster Gazette), a small magazine that enjoyed visibility beyond its size due in part to the patronage of the Fifth Earl of Rosebery. Royde-Smith rose from being a contributor to the editor of the "problems and prizes" page, a responsibility she shared with her sister Leslie (who would marry George Maitland Lloyd Davies). She moved on to writing drama reviews and then, in 1912, became the Westminster Gazette's literary editor, the first woman to attain this position. As editor, she championed the work of Rupert Brooke (whose early poems she published), Graham Greene (whose career she helped to launch), Elizabeth Bowen and Rose Macaulay (both of whose first stories she published), D. H. Lawrence, and Walter de la Mare. Beginning after World War I and continuing after the Westminster Gazette folded in 1928, she hosted a literary salon with her then-flatmate Macaulay that was attended by Edith Sitwell, Osbert Sitwell, Aldous Huxley, W. B. Yeats, and de la Mare.

In the mid 1920s, Royde-Smith published the first of her novels, along with plays, biographies, and other works, an occupation that she was able to take up full time after the Gazette closed. Her books examine mundane lives, especially those of women, and often progress from a slow start to a faster-paced, suspenseful finish. Two of her novels—her first, The Tortoise-Shell Cat (1925), and The Island (1930)—deal openly if somewhat bleakly with lesbian themes. The Tortoise-Shell Cat, which has been held to be her best book, is about a thwarted relationship between a young teacher and a predatory older woman; it has gone in and out of print several times. Royde-Smith converted to Catholicism in 1942, and three of her novels have Catholic themes: For Us in the Dark (1937), Miss Bendix (1947), and The Iniquity of Us All (1949).

Several of her books are histories: The Private Life of Mrs. Siddons (1933) and her biography of Julie de Lespinasse, which has been praised as a model of its kind. Outside Information: A Diary of Rumour (1941) started out as a diary of World War II in which Royde-Smith intended to focus on how little ordinary people knew about what was going on and ended as a memoir of the Blitz. The novel In the Wood (1928) is partly autobiographical, describing aspects of her Yorkshire childhood.

As its title suggests, Jane Fairfax: A New Novel (1940) is inspired by Jane Austen's novel Emma. It is experimental in that it mixes together characters from Emma, characters devised by Royde-Smith, and the two authors themselves.

Royde-Smith published her last novel in 1960, her eyesight by then was rapidly deteriorating. She died in 1964 of renal failure. She is buried in Hampstead Cemetery.

== Personal life ==
Royde-Smith met Walter de la Mare in 1911 and he fell in love with her. Over the next five years he wrote her almost 400 love letters even though he was married and had no intention of leaving his family. Royde-Smith was ambivalent about the relationship, though she enjoyed being de la Mare's muse, and she inspired some of his most significant work.

Later, in 1926, she married Ernest Milton, a London-based Italian-American actor who played many roles with the Old Vic from 1918 and who also appeared as Robespierre in Alexander Korda’s 1934 film of The Scarlet Pimpernel. They lived in Hatfield, Chelsea, Wells, and Winchester, returning to London towards the end of Royde-Smith's life.

== Quotes ==
I know two things about a horse
And one of them is rather coarse.

== In popular culture ==
The character Aunt Evelyn in Rose Macaulay's 1926 novel Crewe Train—an intelligent, stylish, gossipy person of an interfering disposition—is said to have been based on Royde-Smith.

De la Mare referred to her under the private name 'Ann' and wrote of her:

Poor tired Ann tries all she can
To dream like a child & work like a man;
What wonder she's weary, what wonder she's wan.

== Works ==
=== Novels ===
- The Tortoise-Shell Cat (1925)
- The Housemaid: A Novel in Three Parts (1926)
- Skin-Deep or Portrait of Lucinda (1927)
- John Fanning's Legacy (1927)
- In the Wood: A Novel in Three Parts (1928)
- Summer Holiday: Or, Gibraltar (1929)
- Give Me My Sin Again: A Novel (1929)
- The Lover (1929)
- The Island (1930)
- The Delicate Situation (1931)
- The Mother (1931, 1932)
- Incredible Tale (1932)
- The Bridge (1932)
- David (1933)
- The Private Life of Mrs. Siddons (1933)
- Jake: A Novel (1935)
- All Star Cast (1936)
- For Us in the Dark (1937)
- Miss Bendix (1938)
- Urchin Moor (1939)
- The Younger Venus (1939)
- The Altar-Piece: An Edwardian Mystery (1939)
- Jane Fairfax: A New Novel (1940)
- The Unfaithful Wife (1942)
- Mildensee: A Romance (1943)
- Fire-Weed (1944)
- Love in Mildensee (1948)
- The Iniquity of Us All: A Prelude (1949)
- Rosy Trodd (1950)
- The New Rich (1951)
- She Always Caught the Post: A Story (1953)
- Melilot (1955)
- The Whistling Chambermaid (1957)
- How White is My Sepulchre (1958)
- A Blue Rose (1959)
- Love and a Birdcage (1960)

=== Short story collections ===
- Madam Julia's Tale, and Other Stories (1932)

=== Biographies and historical studies ===
- The Double Heart: A Study of Julie de Lespinasse (1931)
- The Private Life of Mrs. Siddons: A Psychological Investigation (Victor Gollancz, 1933)
  - published in America as Portrait of Mrs. Siddons: A Study in Four Parts (Viking Press, 1933)
- The State of Mind of Mrs. Sherwood (Macmillan, 1946)
- The Idol and the Shrine: Being the Story of Maurice de Guérin (1949)

=== Plays ===
- A Balcony: A Play in Three Acts (1928)
- Mrs. Siddons: A Play in Four Acts (1931)

=== Memoir and travelogue ===
- Pictures and People, a Transatlantic Criss-Cross between Roger Hinks in London and Naomi Royde-Smith (Mrs. Ernest Milton) in New York, Boston, Philadelphia during the Months of January, February, March of the Year 1930 (1930)
- Pilgrim from Paddington: The Record of an Experiment in Travel Made (1933)
- Van Lords, or: The Sport of Removing (1934)
- Outside Information: A Diary of Rumour (1941)

=== Anthologies, compilations, miscellaneous works ===
- Una and the Red Cross Knight and Other Tales from Spenser’s Faery Queene (1905)
- The Pillow Book, a Garner of Many Moods (1906)
- Poets of Our Day (1908)
- Westminster Problems Book, prose and verse compiled by N. G. Royde Smith from the Saturday Westminster Gazette Competitions, 1904–1907 (1908)
- Second Problems Book, prizes and proximes from the Saturday Westminster Gazette, 1908–1909, edited by N. G. Royde Smith (1909)
- A Private Anthology (1924)
