= Islands (restaurant) =

Tropical-themed restaurant chain in California and Arizona, USA

Islands Restaurants, LP

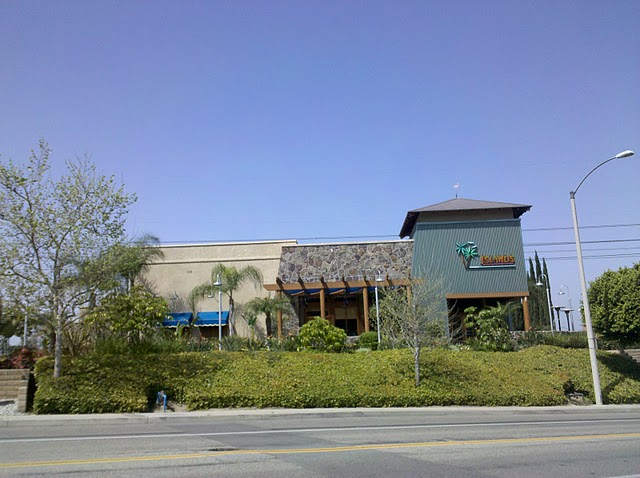
- A location in Anaheim Hills
- Trade name: Islands Fine Burgers & Drinks
- Company type: Private
- Industry: Restaurants
- Genre: Casual dining
- Founded: May 1982; 44 years ago, in West Los Angeles, California
- Founder: Tony DeGrazier
- Headquarters: Carlsbad, California, U.S.
- Number of locations: 39 (2024)
- Key people: Michael Smith (CEO); Neil Mactaggart (President)
- Products: Burgers, tacos, chicken sandwiches, salads, alcoholic beverages
- Owner: Tony DeGrazier
- Website: islandsrestaurants.com

Islands Fine Burgers & Drinks (also known as Islands) is a casual dining restaurant chain that specializes in burgers, fresh cut fries, and specialty drinks.

Their tropical-themed restaurants are decorated to evoke the Hawaiian concept of "ohana" (family). Despite being known for their burgers and fries, various other types of food are also offered, such as tacos, chicken sandwiches, and multiple entree salads.

== History ==
The company was founded in May 1982 by entrepreneur Tony DeGrazier in West Los Angeles. DeGrazier got the idea for his business while serving in the US Navy in O‘ahu in the 1960s.

By the late 2000s, the chain had grown to more than 50 locations throughout the Southwestern United States. The original Islands in West LA closed in 2018 due to rising rent costs.

Islands closed eight locations during the course of the COVID-19 pandemic, including its only locations in Nevada and Hawaii. It was also during this time when DeGraizer left the restaurant and retired in 2020, selling his company to private investors.

In 2023, the restaurant launched Tortilla Beach by Islands, a delivery and take-out based concept specializing in Mexican-inspired food such as burritos, tacos and bowls.

== Corporate ==
The company is based in Carlsbad, California. It does not offer franchise opportunities.

== See also ==
- List of hamburger restaurants
- List of restaurant chains in the United States
