= Ian Wallace (drummer) =

English drummer (1946–2007)

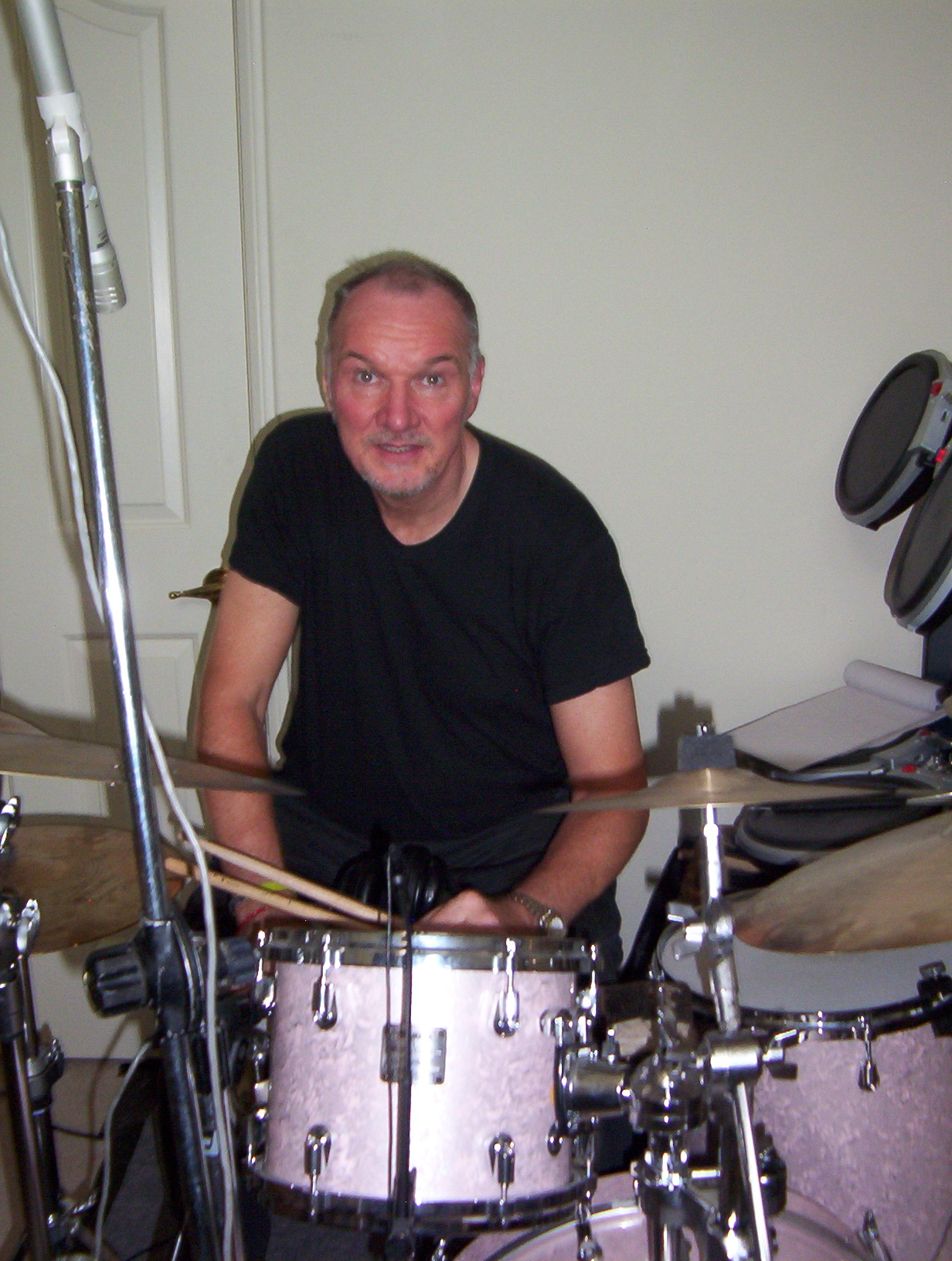
- Wallace in 2005

Background information
- Born: Ian Russell Wallace; 29 September 1946; Bury, Lancashire, England
- Died: 22 February 2007 (aged 60) Los Angeles, California, US
- Genres: Rock; pop; jazz
- Occupation: Musician
- Instruments: Drums; percussion; vocals
- Years active: 1968–2007
- Formerly of: King Crimson; El Rayo-X; Nalle; Big Sound; Procol Harum; 21st Century Schizoid Band; The Crimson Jazz Trio
- Spouse: Jenny Boyd (m. 1984)

Ian Russell Wallace (29 September 1946 – 22 February 2007) was an English rock and jazz drummer, most visibly as a member of progressive rock band King Crimson, as a member of David Lindley's El Rayo-X and as Don Henley's drummer.

== Early years ==
Wallace was born in Bury and educated at Bury Grammar School. He formed his first band, The Jaguars, at school, before going on to join The Warriors with Jon Anderson in his pre-Yes days. (Wallace later played with Yes once in November 1968 during Bill Bruford's hiatus from the band).

From The Warriors, Wallace went on to join Big Sound. In the 1960s, Big Sound worked in Denmark, Norway and Sweden as a backing band of Danish rock musician Nalle. The Big Sound and The Warriors had been mates, and had gigged together in the Storyville Club, Frankfurt, Cologne and Copenhagen. The Big Sound's drummer and bass player left, after which Ian and The Warriors bass player, Dave Foster, joined the band. When the Big Sound split at the end of 1967 during a tour of Norway, some members, including Wallace, moved to London to back other artists such as Sandie Shaw, David Garrick, Marv Johnson and Lou Christie.

== Prime years ==
Wallace later joined Vivian Stanshall's BiG GrunT, and then The World with Neil Innes before King Crimson. He appeared on the album Islands in 1971, and on the live album Earthbound in 1972, as well as a number of later archival releases. In May 1972, at the end of a US tour, he and fellow Crimson members Mel Collins and Boz Burrell left the band and went to work for Alexis Korner's Snape. By 1974, he was the drummer with blues rock band Oily Rags, featuring alongside pianist Chas Hodges and bassist Dave Peacock; when that duo launched themselves as Chas & Dave a year later, Wallace contributed to their first album.

Wallace subsequently worked with Steve Marriott's All-Stars and was invited to join Bob Dylan's band in 1978 and accompanied Dylan during his tour of Japan. Wallace's heavy drum style was the driving force behind the pop-heavy album Street-Legal. He toured again with Dylan in the early 1990s. In 1977 he also worked briefly with Foreigner subbing some dates after their regular drummer, Dennis Elliott, injured his hand.

Other notable work includes Ry Cooder in 1979 and Don Henley in the 1980s and 1990s. Wallace's studio and live credits also include El Rayo-X with David Lindley, Bonnie Raitt, Joe Walsh, Bob Dylan, Johnny Hallyday, Keith Emerson, Roy Orbison, Jackson Browne, the Traveling Wilburys, Eric Clapton, Jon Anderson, Alvin Lee, Crosby, Stills and Nash, the Quireboys, Larry Coryell, Stevie Nicks, Lindsey Buckingham, Steve Marriott, Al Kooper, Tim Buckley, Lonnie Mack, Procol Harum (1993 tour), and Warren Zevon.

== Later years and death ==
Following a move to Nashville, Tennessee, in 1998, Wallace worked as a producer and player. Among his later studio recordings there were sessions with Kim Richey, Tim Krekel, Rick Vito, Dean Dillon, Rosie Flores, Jessi Alexander, producer Gary Nicholson, Steve Ripley, Jan Pulsford, Tim Hinkley, Charlie Taylor, Rodney Crowell and the legendary songwriter Dan Penn. He also performed live with T. Graham Brown, the Nashville Chamber Orchestra, Rick Vito, Jessi Alexander, and Billy Burnette, the latter in a quartet that included bassist Dave Roe (Johnny Cash) and Kenny Vaughan (Lucinda Williams).

In 2003, he joined the 21st Century Schizoid Band, and released his only solo studio album, Happiness with Minimal Side Effects.

In 2005 he formed the Crimson Jazz Trio with Tim Landers on bass and Jody Nardone on piano, which released King Crimson Songbook Volume One in November 2005 and King Crimson Songbook Volume Two in early 2009.

On 10 August 2006, Wallace was diagnosed with oesophageal cancer. He chronicled his illness in his online blog in the hope his story would encourage others with similar symptoms to pursue treatment. He died, aged 60, with his wife, Marjorie Pomeroy, at his side.

== Selected discography ==
=== The Warriors ===
Single :

- 1964: You came along/Don't make me blue – Decca Records

Albums :

- 2003: The Warriors : Bolton Club 1965
- 2003: The Warriors '65

=== The World ===
- 1970: The World – Lucky Planet

=== King Crimson ===
- 1971: Islands
- 1972: Earthbound
- 1998: Live at Jacksonville, 1972
- 2000: Live at Summit Studios: Denver, 03/12/1972
- 2001: Live in Detroit 1971
- 2002: Ladies of the Road
- 2003: Live in Orlando, 1972
- 2017: Sailors' Tales 1970-1972, 27-disc boxed set

=== Snape ===
- 1973: Accidentally Born in New Orleans
- 1974: Snape Live on Tour in Germany

=== Oily Rags ===
- 1974: Oily Rags

=== David Lindley and El Rayo-X ===
- 1981: El Rayo-X
- 1982: Win This Record
- 1983: El Rayo Live
- 1985: Mr Dave

=== Johnny Hallyday ===
- 1995: Lorada
- 1996: Destination Vegas
- 1996: Lorada Tour
- 2003: À La Cigale
- 2003: Live at the Aladdin Theatre

=== The Wallace/Trainor Conspiracy ===
- 1998: Take A Train

=== Crimson Jazz Trio ===
- 2005: King Crimson Songbook, Volume One
- 2009: King Crimson Songbook, Volume Two

=== 21st Century Schizoid Band ===
- 2006: Pictures of a City: Live in New York

=== Solo ===
- 2003: Happiness With Minimal Side Effects

=== Collaborations ===
- 1972: Billy Burnette – Billy Burnette
- 1973: Jackson Heights – Bump & Grind
- 1973: Alvin Lee & Mylon LeFevre – On the Road to Freedom
- 1973: Esther Phillips – Black-Eyed Blues
- 1974: Alexis Korner – Alexis Korner
- 1974: Big Jim Sullivan – Big Jims Back
- 1974: Alvin Lee – In Flight
- 1975: Alvin Lee – Pump Iron!
- 1975: Labi Siffre – Remember My Song
- 1975: Chas & Dave – One Fing 'n' Anuvver
- 1976: Steve Marriott – Marriott
- 1978: Bob Dylan – Street-Legal
- 1979: Bob Dylan – Bob Dylan at Budokan
- 1981: Ronnie Wood – 1234
- 1982: Don Henley – I Can't Stand Still
- 1983: Jon Anderson – Animation
- 1983: Stevie Nicks – The Wild Heart
- 1984: Don Henley – Building the Perfect Beast
- 1986: Graham Nash – Innocent Eyes
- 1986: Jackson Browne – Lives in the Balance
- 1986: Bonnie Raitt – Nine Lives
- 1988: Traveling Wilburys – Traveling Wilburys Vol. 1
- 1989: Roy Orbison – Mystery Girl
- 1990: London Quireboys – A Bit of What You Fancy
- 1991: Jump in the Water – Jump in the Water
- 1995: Alvin Lee & Ten Years After – Pure Blues
- 1995: Joe Walsh – A Future to This Life: Robocop – The Series Soundtrack
- 1997: Humble Pie – The Scrubbers Sessions
- 1998: Bruce Donnola - Vaudeville
- 2000: Billy Burnette – Are You With Me Baby
- 2000: Alvin Lee & Ten Years After – Solid Rock
- 2001: Rodney Crowell – The Houston Kid
- 2003: Bob Dylan – Street-Legal [Remastered]
- 2005: Fission Trip – Fission Trip, Volume One
- 2005: Adrian Belew – Side One
- 2006: Skye Edwards – Mind How You Go
- 2007: Traveling Wilburys – Traveling Wilburys
- 2007: Steve Marriott's All Stars – Wham Bam
