= Nard Jones =

American writer (1904–1972)

- Born: 1904; Seattle, Washington, U.S.
- Died: 1972 (aged 67–68)
- Education: Whitman College
- Occupation: Writer

Nard Jones (1904–1972) was an American writer, best known for his novels set in Oregon and the Pacific Northwest.

== Life ==
According to Jones' self-description in "Puget Sound Profiles", he was born in Seattle and graduated with honors from Whitman College, beginning his career as a campus correspondent for the Walla Walla Daily Bulletin. He was chief editorial writer for the Seattle Post-Intelligencer.

He lived in the city of Weston, Oregon, with his parents between 1919 and 1927. Jones described himself as an "un-reconstructed Puget Sounder – a salmon eater, an apple knocker, a rain worshiper, a sage-brusher, a whistle punk from the big woods and a fancier of mountain peaks at sunrise".

He wrote and narrated short stories for the radio program "Puget Sound Profiles" broadcast in the early 1960s on over a dozen stations in Washington State, including KOMO, KTAC, and KAGT, among others.

Jones lived and worked in several parts of the United States but focused most of his career on the Puget Sound Country. He wrote over 300 short stories for magazines and 17 books, 12 of them novels.

== Oregon Detour ==
Jones' first novel, Oregon Detour, was set in a fictional Oregon town of 600 inhabitants called Creston. When his novel, written according to the tenets of the New Realism literary movement (established years before by Sherwood Anderson, Sinclair Lewis and others), was published in 1930, many of the residents of Weston were convinced that his characters were based on local inhabitants, and considered the work a slander against the town.

While the legend that Jones was sued and run out of town for his book is not true, some residents of the town did in fact make an effort to suppress local access to the book. Copies of the novel were stolen from the local library; after the novel became the subject for a high school student's book report, his English teacher removed the book from both the reading list and the high school library. According to George Venn, local literary historian, even in the 1980s "trying to figure out or trying to remember who the 'real people' in the novel is still a local pastime."

== Works ==
- Oregon Detour. New York: Payson & Clarke. 1930. ISBN 0-87071-500-3. OCLC 4351177.
- The Petlands ... New York: Brewer, Warren, & Putnam, Inc. 1931. OCLC 9520415.
- Wheat Women. New York: Duffield and Green. 1933. OCLC 7535858.
- All Six Were Lovers, a novel. New York: Dodd, Mead & Company. 1934. OCLC 7518080.
- Jack Gordon Gose (1937). West, Young Man!. Portland, Or.: Metropolitan Press. OCLC 5524160.
- The Case of the Hanging Lady. New York: Dodd, Mead & Company. 1938. OCLC 18596019.
- Swift Flows the River. New York: Dodd, Mead & company. 1940. OCLC 152006170.
- Scarlet Petticoat. New York: Dodd, Mead & Company. 1941. OCLC 1570829.
- Still to the West. New York: Dodd, Mead. 1946. OCLC 1550544.
- Evergreen Land, a Portrait of the State of Washington. New York: Dodd, Mead & Co. 1947. OCLC 1506398.
- Washington State. Philadelphia, Pa.: Curtis Pub. Co. 1947. OCLC 41815671.
- The Island, a novel. New York: W. Sloane. 1948. OCLC 1310528.
- I'll Take What's Mine. New York: Fawcett Publications. 1954. OCLC 18595969.
- Ride the Dark Storm. New York: Fawcett Publications. 1955. OCLC 18595935.
- The Great Command; the Story of Marcus and Narcissa Whitman and the Oregon Country Pioneers. Boston: Little, Brown. 1959. OCLC 807482.
- Rediscovering Washington State. Washington State Dept. of Commerce and Economic Development. 1960. OCLC 15691201.
- Stewart Hall Holbrook; Nard Jones; Roderick Langmere Haig-Brown; Anthony Netboy (1963). The Pacific Northwest. Garden City, N.Y.: Doubleday. OCLC 1336269.
- Puget Sound Profiles. Seattle: Puget Sound Power & Light. 1967. OCLC 27156647.
- Seattle. Garden City, N.Y.: Doubleday. 1972. ISBN 0-385-01875-4.
