= List of My Hero Academia characters =

Some of the main characters from My Hero Academia. From left to right: Tenya "Ingenium" Ida, Ochaco "Uravity" Uraraka, Izuku "Deku" Midoriya, Katsuki "Dynamight" Bakugo, and Shoto Todoroki

The My Hero Academia manga and anime series features various characters created by Kōhei Horikoshi. The series takes place in a fictional world where over 80% of the population possesses a superpower, commonly referred to as a "Quirk" (個性, Kosei). People's acquisition of these abilities has given rise to both professional heroes and villains.

== U.A. High School students ==
In the series, U.A. High School (雄英高校, Yūei Kōkō) is a top-ranked academy for training heroes. The school is located atop a forested hill somewhere near Shizuoka Prefecture, Japan. There are four academic tracks, or courses, available to students: Hero, General, Support, and Management. Students who are not accepted into the Hero Course are included in the General Course. However, they can still be transferred into the Hero Course by impressing the faculty at the Sports Festival and by making passing grades. As stated by Class 1-A's homeroom teacher, Shota Aizawa, U.A. does not adhere to traditional school methods and allows their faculty to teach their classes however they like. This includes teachers having the authority to expel students for any reason, no matter how minor.^{[ch. 5]} Students who are expelled can be re-enrolled, although the expulsion will remain on their permanent records.^{[ch. 257]}

=== Class 1-A students ===
Izuku Midoriya (緑谷 出久, Midoriya Izuku) / Deku (デク)

Voiced by: Daiki Yamashita (Anime and Vomic), Akeno Watanabe (Anime; young), Yuna Taniguchi (Vomic; young) (Japanese); Justin Briner, Lara Woodhull (young) (English)

The main protagonist of the series, Izuku, is a timid, selfless, and Quirkless teenager from a place near Shizuoka Prefecture who dreams of becoming a superhero. He is initially portrayed as insecure, tearful, vulnerable, and unexpressive, due to years of his childhood friend Bakugo looking down on him for lacking a Quirk. He is also a diligent and strong-willed student, being very enthusiastic about topics related to heroes. His dream drives him to write notes about everything he learns regarding heroes' Quirks and fighting capabilities. He sometimes even surprises the heroes themselves with his vast knowledge. Thanks to this practice, Izuku has developed a keen analytical mind and can quickly form complex battle plans, factoring in the ways he can use the Quirks of allies and enemies alike to best advantage. He helps, or lectures, people with personal and emotional problems, regardless whether it is any of his business, claiming that a hero should meddle in other people's lives. He externalizes his observations by mumbling, a habit that annoys his peers, including All Might.^{[ch. 1]}^{[ep 2]}^{[ep 5]}^{[ep 40]} It is implied that he has a crush on Ochaco, as he has been shown to blush around her more than other girls. After attempting to save Bakugo from a villain, All Might chooses him to inherit his abilities and become the ninth user of One For All (ワン・フォー・オール, Wan Fō Ōru), a transferable Quirk that allows a hero to stockpile power and thus grants immense strength, speed, stamina, and durability.^{[ep 3]} Eventually, Izuku becomes the first user to manifest a psychic link with the spirits of past One For All users and inherit their Quirks. After nearly a year of school activities and internships, some of which are interrupted by villain attacks, Izuku learns that All for One's apprentice Tomura Shigaraki has become powerful enough to steal One for All. As a result, Izuku decides to leave U.A. in order to combat Shigaraki and his army of villains without endangering his classmates. Prior to leaving, he informs his classmates and several top heroes about One for All, the latter of whom assist him in hunting down the villains.

Katsuki Bakugo (爆豪 勝己, Bakugō Katsuki) / Kacchan (かっちゃん, Katchan) / Dynamight (ダイナマイト, Dainamaito)

Voiced by: Nobuhiko Okamoto (Anime), Yūichirō Umehara (Vomic), Sachi Kokuryu (Anime; young), Rie Takahashi (Vomic; young) (Japanese); Clifford Chapin, Kate Oxley (young) (English)

Izuku's high-tempered childhood friend turned archrival and classmate in Class 1-A, who is from a place near Shizuoka Prefecture. His Quirk is Explosion (爆破/破裂/爆発, Bakuha/Haretsu/Bakuhatsu) which enables him to secrete sweat with nitroglycerin-like properties from his hands and ignite it on command to produce powerful explosions. The Ultra Analysis guidebook states that Bakugo describes his own personality as an "abusive egotist".^{[GB p. 25]} He is a crude, arrogant, short-tempered, and aggressive person, especially at the beginning of the series.^{[ep 1]} Because of his Quirk and talents, Katsuki is very confident and brave, to the point he will go against anyone who challenges him. He never backs down from a fight and will go all out when facing powerful opponents. As a result of, in childhood, having been excessively praised by his peers for his strong Quirk and natural-born talent, Bakugo became very egotistical and disrespectful, especially towards Izuku. Both characters share an emotionally laden history with each other, with Katsuki being unable to overcome his issues with Izuku. However, this has not stopped them from working together, especially during the Final Exams Arc.^{[ep 37]} Katsuki prefers to reflect in silence and solitude, becoming a bit more brooding during those periods. His unchecked pride and aggressiveness frequently cost him victories, as shown during the Battle Trial and the Provisional Hero License Exam, and this worsens when Izuku is involved. Despite having bullied Izuku since they were kids, over the course of the series Katsuki comes to care for Izuku's well-being, especially after learning the truth about One For All. After Izuku leaves U.A. to keep his friends and family safe from All For One, Bakugo finally mends his relationship with him by apologizing to him for his behavior over the years and calling him by his real name.^{[ep 136]} In the Final War arc, Bakugo was assigned to fight in "Coffin in The Sky" by All Might. During his time there he uses his well-developed move, Cluster, on Shigaraki. Unfortunately he is fatally injured as Shigaraki pierces Bakugo's heart, killing him. Later on, Best Jeanist and Edgeshot, who sacrifices his life to reviveBakugo. Fortunately, their attempts were able to revive him, allowing him to continue fighting Shigaraki with Izuku.

Ochaco Uraraka (麗日 お茶子, Uraraka Ochako) / Uravity (ウラビティ, Urabiti)

Voiced by: Ayane Sakura (Japanese); Luci Christian (English)

Ochaco is a bubbly and cheerful girl whose Quirk, Zero Gravity (無重力(ゼログラビティ)Mujūryoku, Zero Gurabiti), enables her to make any object weightless by touching it with the extended pads on her fingertips. However, overusing this Quirk will cause her to suffer from severe nausea.^{[ep 4]} She is from Mie Prefecture, and is the only student in her class to come from the Kansai region. Horikoshi describes Ochaco as "honest". In a prototype concept made by Horikoshi, Ochaco was originally named Yu Takeyama, the full name later given to Mt. Lady as well as the Quirk. However, Horikoshi thought that it would have made her too powerful.^{[vol. 1, character notes]} Ochaco has been described as "the most laid back girl" in her class, but she is often blunt without being aware of it. She often becomes amused at certain personality traits others exhibit, bursting into laughter that she tries to suppress. She is the one who inspires and embraces Izuku's hero name, saying that "Deku" sounds similar to "dekiru" (出来る), roughly translating to "[you] can do it". She is a warm individual who often thinks positively but is objective enough to see flaws, as well as virtues. She is empathetic and friendly to those she meets, and will try to help anyone who is kind to her or needs help.^{[ep 6]} Despite her usually cheery manner, she can be determined and focused when the situation calls for it. She has feelings for Izuku, but keeps them private, to focus on her goal of becoming a hero and providing for her parents. Unlike all of her classmates, who use smartphones, Ochaco still owns a flip phone, due to coming from a poor household.^{[ep 22]} In terms of heroism, Ochaco has preferred rescue, admiring Thirteen for the latter's expertise in the area. She is aware of her physical limitations, deciding to choose the combat-oriented hero Gunhead for her internship, to increase her fighting repertoire.^{[ep 26]} Over time, she develops a new sense of battle awareness and becomes a more instinctive fighter.^{[ch. 67]} After her classmates successfully bring Izuku back to U.A. and the civilians begin to protest about having to pay the price for the heroes' mistakes, she pleads with the crowd and convinces them to let Izuku rest, as heroes also deserve to be saved.^{[ep 137]}During the Final War arc, she fights Toga on Okuto Island, which is dragged into the Gunga Villa battleground by the awakened Kurogiri. In a near fatal battle with Toga, she is saved by Toga through a blood transplant that kills Toga. In More+ she confesses her feelings to Izuku.

Shoto Todoroki (轟 焦凍, Todoroki Shōto) / Shoto (ショート, Shōto)

Voiced by: Yūki Kaji, Kei Shindō (young) (Japanese); David Matranga, Mikaela Krantz (young) (English)

Shoto Todoroki is a self-composed and aloof student in Class 1-A, who is from a place near Shizuoka Prefecture. His Quirk Half-Cold Half-Hot (半分冷たく半分熱い/半冷半燃, Hanbun Tsumetaku Hanbun Atsui/Hanrei Han'nen) enables him to generate ice from the right side of his body and fire from the left. He is one of the few students in U.A. High School who received an application through taking the Recommendation Entrance Exam.^{[ch. 11]} He was originally cold and aloof as a result of his abusive upbringing and complicated family life, and preferred to keep to himself instead of socializing. He is the youngest child of Endeavor and, as a result of the harsh abuse he suffered, refused to use his left side's powers for years, until Izuku helped him understand that using his fire powers does not mean that he has to accept his heritage.^{[ep 23]} After the events of the U.A. Sports Festival, he notably becomes more sociable and kind, even gaining a sense of humor and occasionally smiling, although still retaining some of his previous distant attitude. After he goes to visit his mother Rei Todoroki in the hospital, their interactions are awkward as a result of how much time they spent apart.^{[LN 1]} He remains relatively cold towards Endeavor and has made clear that forgiveness for his past treatment of him and his mother is difficult; but he has shown concern for their safety. Ever since Endeavor tried to repair his relationship with his family, Shoto has taken a cautious, yet hopeful approach to further development.^{[ep 90]}

Tenya Ida (飯田 天哉, Īda Ten'ya) / Ingenium (インゲニウム, Ingeniumu)
Voiced by: Kaito Ishikawa (Japanese); J. Michael Tatum (English)

Tenya Ida is the strait-laced president of Class 1-A, who is from Tokyo. His Quirk Engine (エンジン発動機/機関/エンジン, Enjin Hatsudō-ki/Kikan/Enjin) gives him super speed and superhuman kicking strength from the jet engines in his calves. In the first volume, Horikoshi mentions that Tenya was created during the serialization meeting and that the character and his design ended up deviating from the original concept.^{[vol. 1]} Tenya initially appears to be unfriendly and intimidating, but is actually a straightforward, earnest, disciplined, and noble person, although clueless about personal interactions as a result of his elite upbringing. He takes everything seriously and is known for his habit of jumping to conclusions, then enthusiastically speaking or acting based on these conclusions. For example, after Izuku perceives Tenya's true nature during the Entrance Exam, Tenya sees him as a worthy peer and has since held him in high esteem.^{[ch. 5]} As Class 1-A's president, Tenya is obsessed with organization and discipline and expects his classmates to follow suit, which often annoys them. He is also humble and willing to admit to his mistakes, apologize for his behavior, and improve himself in areas he is lacking. Being a member of the highly esteemed Ida family, Tenya is proud of his lineage and works hard to meet high expectations. He admires his older brother Tensei, and aspires to become a hero like him.^{[ep 9]} After Tensei is forced to retire, after being critically injured by the Hero Killer Stain, Tenya takes up his mantle.

Eijiro Kirishima (切島 鋭児郎, Kirishima Eijirō) / Red Riot (烈怒頼雄斗(レッドライオット), Reddo Raiotto)
Voiced by: Toshiki Masuda (Japanese); Justin Cook (English)

Eijiro Kirishima is a boisterous, chivalrous student in Class 1-A; he is from Chiba Prefecture. His Quirk Hardening (固め/焼入れ/硬化, Katame/Yakiire/Kōka) enables him to harden his body; however, there is a limit to how much damage his hardened body can withstand, and the Hardening itself slowly dissipates. Also, he loses stamina from keeping his Quirk active.^{[ep 24]} Eijiro is fond of a concept of manliness, often using the terms "manly" and "unmanly" to describe things and people he does or does not like.^{[ep 100]} He is determined and selfless, bravely putting the safety of others before his own. Thanks to his respectful and encouraging behavior, he can make friends with most people he encounters, particularly those that show as much passion and resolve as he does. He is loyal and dedicated to his friends and will break laws and rules to help them, becoming regretful if he is unable to aid them. He has a strong sense of responsibility, sometimes being very hard on himself for any negative outcomes that befall him or his friends. When he was younger, Kirishima tried to become a hero with his less-developed hardening Quirk; to fight against actual villains, he needed a boost to truly pursue his heroic dreams. Prior to enrolling at U.A. High, he knew Ashido when they were in middle school, and he tried to stop students from getting bullied. He was hesitant to save some of his classmates when a mysterious villain threatened them, but regained his resolve thanks to a speech from his favorite hero, Crimson Riot.

Tsuyu Asui (蛙吹 梅雨, Asui Tsuyu) / Froppy (フロッピー, Furoppi)
Voiced by: Aoi Yūki (Japanese); Monica Rial (English)

Tsuyu Asui is a sincere frog-like girl in Class 1-A; she is from Aichi Prefecture. Her Quirk Frog (蛙/がま, Gama/Kaeru) gives her abilities such as enhanced swimming and jumping, sticking to and climbing up walls, and a long prehensile tongue. She was originally going to be male, but Horikoshi made her female because of the lack of girls in Class 1-A.^{[vol. 2]} She is a straightforward and aloof individual who bluntly speaks her mind. She prefers to be called "Tsu", but only by those she views as friends.^{[ch. 80]} Her usual expression is a vacant stare, which makes reading her thoughts and emotions difficult for those around her. Tsuyu has a habit of putting her finger against her mouth while speaking, pondering, or showing curiosity. She says "ribbit" ("kero" in Japanese), emulating a frog's croaking at the end of her sentences, or as a replacement for many single-word replies. When several members of Class 1-A agree to rescue Bakugo after the Vanguard Action Squad Invasion, Tsuyu is the most outspoken against it, asserting that acting emotionally and breaking the law to rescue him makes them essentially the same as villains.^{[ep 46]} She rarely shows her feelings outside of the dormitories.^{[ep 51]}

Momo Yaoyorozu (八百万 百, Yaoyorozu Momo) / Creati (クリエイティ, Kurieiti)
Voiced by: Marina Inoue (Japanese); Colleen Clinkenbeard (English)

Momo Yaoyorozu is the mature and level-headed vice president of Class 1-A; she is from Aichi Prefecture. Her Quirk Creation (設定/創造/クリエーション, Settei/Sōzō/Kuriēshon) allows her to create any non-biological object from the lipids stored in her body as long as she knows its molecular structure. Horikoshi states that Momo cannot create living beings, correcting a previous statement that erroneously claimed that Momo could not produce any organic material. Her Quirk was originally going to belong to a Pro Hero, but Horikoshi thought that such an overpowering ability would be more interesting if handled by an inexperienced character.^{[vol. 2]} She is one of the few students to apply at U.A. High School through official recommendations.^{[ch. 11]} Momo is a prudent and dedicated person who is a natural leader. She is kind and polite and quite reserved, yet can be blunt with her criticism of people's mistakes and miscalculations. She wishes to help her peers improve and become great heroes, such as when she tutors her classmates at her home.^{[ch. 60]} While originally confident of herself, her pride is crushed after losing to Tokoyami in the U.A. Sports Festival^{[ch. 35]} and her invidious comparisons with Shoto Todoroki. She thereby loses confidence in her ability to act on instinct, but thanks to Shoto's encouragement on their final exams, she regains confidence in her quick thinking, learning that people have different skills that can complement each other.^{[ep 35]}

Minoru Mineta (峰田 実, Mineta Minoru) / Grape Juice (グレープジュース, Gurēpu Jūsu)
Voiced by: Ryō Hirohashi (Japanese); Brina Palencia (English)

Mineta Minoru is a diminutive, cowardly, and lecherous boy from Kanagawa Prefecture; his Quirk Pop Off (もぎもぎ/ポップオフ, Mogimogi/Poppuofu) causes to grow on his head many small, highly adhesive grape-like balls, which he can remove and use as weapons. He can also use the balls as trampolines, as his body bounces off them instead of sticking. Overuse of his Quirk will cause his scalp to bleed. The concept for his character was conceived early on, but Horikoshi struggled to balance Minoru's likeability with his perversion. Horikoshi enjoys drawing Minoru, as he sees a bit of himself in him.^{[vol. 2]} Minoru can be very hypocritical, criticizing others for perceived perverted behavior, even if it turns out to be a misunderstanding. He is easily scared in moments of stress or fear and tends to act impulsively, abusing his Quirk recklessly to the point of hurting himself. He is not a confident fighter and may attempt to flee in disadvantageous situations. Despite this, he is smart, able to score very high on tests, and is in the top half of Class 1-A's grades, despite being considered a slacker by most of the class.^{[ch. 60]} He is mostly disliked by the girls of Class 1-A for his perverted tendencies, which have annoyed even Eraser Head.^{[ep 64]}

Denki Kaminari (上鳴 電気, Kaminari Denki) / Chargebolt (チャージズマ, Chājizuma)
Voiced by: Tasuku Hatanaka (Japanese); Kyle Phillips (English)

Denki Kaminari is a flirty, laid-back, and friendly boy from Saitama Prefecture. His Quirk Electrification (充電/電化/帯電, Jūden/Denka/Taiden) allows him to absorb and emit electricity; overusing it causes his brain to "short circuit", in which case he gives a thumbs-up to let others know he is fine. His hero name is a combination of the English word charge (チャージ, chāji), which roughly translates to the name of his Quirk in Japanese, and the end of the Japanese word for lightning (イナズマ, inazuma).^{[ch. 45]} In English, his hero name is translated to "Chargebolt". Horikoshi thinks Denki is fun to draw, but struggles to draw his hair consistently.^{[vol. 3]} Denki is also social and full of energy. He is rather casual when interacting with others, including Bakugo, but is apt to overreact and make petty complaints. He can be blunt and appear to be reckless, but is always well-behaved. Denki is flirtatious towards girls, both in and out of his class. He does not appear to pay attention in class, gets easily bored with lectures, and suffers anxiety attacks when taking tests.^{[ch. 60]} During combat, he is quick to panic and may accidentally activate his Quirk in the face of imminent danger, leaving himself vulnerable. He becomes more reluctant to use his full power when there are allies close to him, as he is afraid of accidentally hurting them. When he is assured that his allies are safe from his powers, he becomes more confident in his fighting abilities. During the Paranormal Liberation War, Denki gets a scar on his upper left forehead after being injured by Mr. Compress' attack.^{[vol. 31, omake]}

Kyoka Jiro (耳郎 響香, Jirō Kyōka) / Earphone Jack (イヤホン = ジャック, Iyahon Jakku)

Voiced by: Kei Shindō (Japanese); Trina Nishimura (English); Chrissy Costanza (singing, both languages)

Kyoka Jiro is a pragmatic, music-loving girl in Class 1-A from Shizuoka Prefecture. Her Quirk Earphone Jack (イヤホンジャック, Iyahon Jakku) allows her to plug her extremely long earlobes into objects to hear minuscule sounds and vibrations from her surroundings or channel the sound of her heartbeat as sonic attacks. Horikoshi has stated that Kyoka may have been the first character he came up with. He was inspired to make a character that could plug their ears into objects while listening to music on his earphones during a trip back home.^{[vol. 3]} Aside from being pragmatic, Kyoka has an unenthusiastic and teasing personality that is mostly shown to those she finds irritating, such as her classmate Denki, whose cluelessness makes him an easy target for her sarcastic comments. However, she enjoys socializing with others. Kyoka often gesticulates through her elongated earlobes in place of her hands.^{[ep 26]} She can also be quite aggressive, as she can use the Earphone Jacks her Quirk provides to physically punish people when provoked or to keep them in line, most notably Denki and Mineta. Despite being seemingly cold and indifferent, she also has a more sensitive side, as she is defensive about her friends, empathetic with others' feelings, and gets flustered when her talents and capabilities are brought up.^{[ep 33]}^{[ep 36]}^{[ep 41]} Like her parents, Kyoka has an interest in rock music and owns several instruments, which she can play to some extent. However, she seems to be initially embarrassed about her interests because she perceives them as completely unrelated to heroism. However, thanks to a great presentation during the U.A. School Festival, she could outgrow that mindset.^{[ch. 182]}

Fumikage Tokoyami (常闇 踏陰, Tokoyami Fumikage) / Tsukuyomi (ツクヨミ)
Voiced by: Yoshimasa Hosoya (Japanese); Jessie James Grelle (English)

Fumikage Tokoyami is a stoic crow-head student in Class 1-A from Shizuoka Prefecture. His Quirk Dark Shadow (黒影(ダークシャドウ)Kokuei, Dāku Shadōu) allows him to manifest and control a sentient shadow monster that grows more powerful in the dark. His hero name is refers to Tsukuyomi, the god of the moon in Japanese mythology and Shinto faith. Horikoshi considered him to be outstanding, but notes this is not the general opinion in the world of My Hero Academia. He also stated that he struggles to draw him.^{[vol. 3]} Fumikage is reserved, serious, and focused, but a bit noble and valiant. Though he does not talk much,^{[ch. 11]} when he teams up with others, he becomes more sociable. During combat, Fumikage is fierce and dependable, with his strength and capabilities rarely being questioned. During his internship, Fumikage describes how Hawks essentially resolves everything by himself and doubts his ability to become a hero. However, thanks to Hawks, his new ability seems to improve, which carries over to the Joint Training Battle.^{[ep 93]} While he is initially quiet and sometimes timid in dangerous situations, such as when he believed the Pro Heroes should rescue Katsuki after his capture, he later proves himself to be worthy of the hero title when he risks his life to save Hawks from Dabi.^{[ch. 271]} The guidebook reveals that Fumikage's choker is worn in honor of a Pro Hero he idolizes, Dark Crystal.^{[GB p. 39]}

Mina Ashido (芦戸 三奈, Ashido Mina) / Pinky (ピンキー, Pinkī)
Voiced by: Eri Kitamura (Japanese); Caitlin Glass (English)

Mina Ashido is an upbeat and outgoing girl in Class 1-A, with pink skin, black eyes, and horns. Her Quirk Acid (酸い/酸っぱい/酸, Sui/Suppai/San) allows her to secrete an acidic fluid from her body, where she can control the solubility and viscosity levels of that fluid. She is from Chiba Prefecture. Mina has the best reflexes out of Class 1-A's students.^{[vol. 4, omake]} She is social and excitable and is shown to become very upset when denied an opportunity to be at a gathering. She possesses a strong fashion sense and likes to go shopping.^{[ch. 38]} Her academic performance is quite poor, which she pretends to dismiss, despite being anxious and frustrated about it. However, she can dedicate herself to her studies if she gets proper tutoring.^{[ch. 60]} Because of her energetic demeanour, Mina enjoys, and is very skilled at, dancing. She is a strict perfectionist when teaching others how to dance, in contrast to her usual happy-go-lucky nature.^{[ch. 169]} She has known Kirishima since they were in middle school and enjoys teasing Uraraka over her romantic feelings towards Izuku. According to the Ultra Analysis guidebook, Mina has "never liked anyone, but wishes she can be in love".^{[GB p. 51]}

Yuga Aoyama (青山 優雅, Aoyama Yūga) / Can't Stop Twinkling
Voiced by: Kōsuke Kuwano (Japanese); Joel McDonald, Meredith McCoy (young) (English)

Yuga Aoyama is a boy whose Quirk Navel Laser (ネビル/へそレーザー, Nebiru/Heso Rēzā) allows him to fire a laser blast from his belly button. His Quirk was inspired by the X-Men member Cyclops. Yuga was born in France, making him the only Class 1-A student to be born outside Japan. Horikoshi has stated that although he does not really understand the character, he is fine with him and has fun drawing him.^{[vol. 1]} Yuga initially appears to be vain and prideful, thinking of himself as superior to the rest of his classmates, especially regarding his Quirk. His expression rarely changes from a closed smile, even when he speaks or is hurt; and he is also apt to get upset if interrupted or questioned. Yuga's sentences often end with a star (☆) symbol, showing a fancy tone. He also plays up his heritage, occasionally employing French words. However, this persona is a façade, as he has severe insecurities and guilt because of the true nature of his Quirk and upbringing. As overusing his Quirk causes him stomach pains, Yuga feels a sense of kinship with Izuku, who has a similar issue with his Quirk.^{[ep 80]} Yuga has always related to Izuku in this sense and wants to know him better. However, it also eliminates any possibility that Yuga acted out of malice. After Izuku thanks him for a surprise the previous night, the two become good friends, with Mina noting Yuga's more cheerful attitude. Yuga is later revealed to have been born Quirkless before acquiring his Quirk after his parents made a deal with All For One; he was forced to serve as the villain's spy within U.A. out of fear for his parents' safety.^{[ch. 336]} For helping the heroes in the final battle against All For One, Yuga and his family are pardoned but he decides to leave U.A. in order to atone for his crimes, promising to one day return to his friends and join them as a true superhero.^{[ch. 425]}

Mezo Shoji (障子 目蔵, Shōji Mezō) / Tentacole (テンタコル, Tentakoru)
Voiced by: Masakazu Nishida (Japanese); Ian Sinclair (English)

Mezo Shoji is a masked student whose Quirk Dupli-Arms (複製腕/デュプリアームズ, Fukuseiwan/Dyupuriāmuzu) allows him to grow individual body organs at the tips of the four webbed tentacles growing from his shoulders. He is from Fukuoka Prefecture and is the only Class 1-A student from the Kyushu region. Despite his frightening appearance, Mezo is a friendly and gentle person who works well with anyone. He was bullied as a child for his appearance, due to his hometown being prejudiced against those whose Quirks make them monstrous, which resulted in him having to wear a mask to not make children cry. However, he took pride in his body when he saved a girl and was inspired to become a hero to fight against prejudice.^{[ch. 371]} He is not the type to hold grudges, as he shows no ill will towards those who unwittingly harm him. He is quite selfless and willing to risk his life for anyone. He can be empathetic and understanding, but still has maturity and a sense of responsibility that prevents him from giving into emotional impulses. He is very protective of his classmates, especially if they are hurt or injured. The guidebook states that his feelings for his friends are stronger than anyone else's and that he does not mind sacrificing himself.^{[GB p. 53]}

Hanta Sero (瀬呂 範太, Sero Hanta) / Cellophane (セロファン, Serofan)
Voiced by: Kiyotaka Furushima (Japanese); Christopher Bevins (English)

Hanta Sero is a sociable and humorous boy from Tokyo. His Quirk Tape (テープにする/ひも/テープ, Tēpu ni Suru/Himo/Tēpu) allows him to shoot cellophane tape from the tape dispenser-like organs on his elbows. Hanta's abilities are similar to that of Spider-Man, as the tape has similar functions to Spider-Man's webs, such as facilitating swinging along buildings and past enemies. The guidebook acknowledges the connection between them by stating that Hanta has a deep admiration for "someone" that fits Spider-Man's description.^{[GB p. 47]} Despite being a background character, Horikoshi likes him enough to consider giving him more prominent roles. He came up with his Quirk and character during a trip to a convenience store. He notes that Hanta's Quirk is his favorite.^{[vol. 3]} Hanta is often the only person to call his classmates out when they are acting crazy. He is quite humorous and often jokes with his classmates. However, when push comes to shove, Hanta is a brave hero-in-training who wishes to prosper on his own while helping others do the same. He makes friends with those around him and is a very laid-back guy. Though not openly flirtatious like Denki or Minoru, Hanta still possesses some interest in girls, as shown during the Provisional License Exam, when Izuku informs him of the girl who transformed into a clone of Ochaco.^{[ep 54]}

Mashirao Ojiro (尾白 猿夫, Ojiro Mashirao) / Tailman (テイルマン, Teiruman)
Voiced by: Kosuke Miyoshi (Japanese); Mike McFarland (Seasons 1-7), Jim Foronda (Season 8) (English)

Mashirao Ojiro is a humble and honest student from Tokyo whose Quirk Tail (尾/尻尾/しっぽ/テイル, O /Shippo/Shippo/Teiru) gives him a thick prehensile tail. Horikoshi has explained that people like Mashirao, who possess mutant appendages, can order custom-made clothing that suits their needs.^{[vol. 2]} Mashirao has a very calm and noble attitude and a deep sense of dignity, which prevents him from accepting results he feels he did not earn with his own abilities. He is also described as a hard worker. Prior to Izuku's fight against Hitoshi Shinso in the Sports Festival event, he told Izuku to avoid talking to Hitoshi because of the latter's brainwashing ability.^{[ch. 33]} Along with a strong sense of dignity, Mashirao can also be described as sheepish and bashful, as he tends to not enjoy the spotlight and is easily embarrassed. He is also shocked easily, such as when he sees Ochaco punch herself in the face during the Joint Training Arc,^{[ch. 194]} as well as when Eri receives a sword much bigger than her during Class 1-A's Christmas party.^{[ep 101]}

Koji Koda (口田 甲司, Kōda Kōji) / Anima (アニマ)
Voiced by: Takuma Nagatsuka (Japanese); Greg Ayres (English)

Koji Koda is a shy and quiet student with rock-like skin whose Quirk Anivoice (生き物ボイス/アニボイス, Ikimono Boisu/Aniboisu) enables him to talk to animals and interact with them in ways that others cannot. He appears to enjoy the company of animals. Because of his shyness, Koda rarely speaks, preferring to use sign language to converse with his classmates. He is from Iwate Prefecture, making him the only student in Class 1-A to be from the Tōhoku region. Horikoshi likes his non-human design.^{[vol. 5]} Koda is the only Class 1-A student to have a pet; a rabbit named "Yuwai-chan" who is dubbed "Kawaii-chan" by his female classmates. He also owns a few animal dolls and decorations in his room, implying he likes cute things.^{[ch. 98]} In the First Term Final Exam, Koda is shown to have entomophobia;^{[ep 36]} however, he can put his fear aside if it means helping his comrades, as shown during the Joint Training Arc.^{[ch. 196]}

Rikido Sato (砂藤 力道, Satō Rikidō) / Sugarman (シュガーマン, Shugāman)
Voiced by: Tōru Nara (Japanese); Cris George (English)

Rikido Sato is a sweets-loving student whose Quirk Sugar Rush (シュガードープ/シュガーラッシュ, Shugā Dōpu/Shugārasshu) enhances his physical strength, at the cost of his cognitive functions, whenever he consumes sugar. For every additional 10 grams of sugar he ingests, he extends the time of his having increased strength by another three minutes. He is from Tottori Prefecture, making him the only student in Class 1-A to be from the Chūgoku region. Horikoshi wanted to show his Quirk earlier, deeming it as "very strong".^{[vol. 5]} Because his Quirk needs sugar to work, Rikido is a very talented baker. He is surprised by the positive reaction to his baking, suggesting that he does not think much of his abilities as a confectioner.^{[ep 51]} Every week in the dorms, he bakes sweets and shares them with his classmates, which he calls "Sugar Time". He pairs his sweets with Yaoyorozu's tea to create a gourmet night. He can also cook other food, as shown during the Christmas party.^{[ch. 242]} The guidebook reveals he has daily tea meetings with Momo.^{[GB p. 59]}

Toru Hagakure (葉隠 透, Hagakure Tōru) / Invisible Girl (インビジブルガール, Inbijiburu Gāru)
Voiced by: Kaori Nazuka (Japanese); Felecia Angelle (English)

Toru Hagakure is a cheery and outgoing girl in Class 1-A from Tokyo whose Quirk Invisibility (不可視/透明化, Fukashi/Tōmeika) makes her entire body invisible and gives her the ability to refract light. Because of her Quirk, her features have only been partially revealed in-series and her hero uniform consists solely of a pair of gloves and boots to maximize her stealth. Like Tsuyu, Toru was supposed to be male, but Horikoshi changed the character to female because of the lack of female students in Class 1-A, as well as thinking that a girl with an invisible body would be a funny concept.^{[vol. 2]} She has described her face as "a combination of Yang Guifei and Francis Xavier".^{[vol. 22: my heroine academia]} Toru is aggressively sociable and appears to like shopping. Her room suggests that she likes plushies and other cute things.^{[ch. 99]} While in battle, she believes that taking off her clothes is a tactical advantage, much to the embarrassment of those around her. She seems to be unaware of what it means to be invisible, such as displaying slight embarrassment at the idea of being seen undressing even when she is wearing her hero costume.^{[ch. 67]} During the U.A. Traitor Arc, Toru is shown to be observant, as she notices that Yuga had not been his usual self after Izuku's return to U.A. Her curiosity led to her discovering that he was a traitor who had, albeit painfully and unwillingly, given intel to All For One. She has also been shown to be emotionally fragile as, after reprimanding Yuga for having betrayed his classmates, she is shown crying about how he had the gall to attend classes with them, as well as during Yuga's interrogation.^{[ch. 337]}

=== Class 1-B students ===
Neito Monoma (物間 寧人, Monoma Neito) / Phantom Thief (ファントムシーフ, Fantomu Shīfu)
Voiced by: Kōhei Amasaki (Japanese); Austin Tindle (English)

Neito Monoma is a boastful student from Kanagawa Prefecture. His Quirk Copy (真似る/写す/原稿/写し/複写/コピー, Maneru/Utsusu/Genkō/Utsushi/Fukusha/Kopi) allows him to temporarily duplicate and use another person's Quirk by simply touching them. He can store four Quirks, but can only activate one at a time.^{[ep 18]} However, he cannot effectively use copied Quirks that require a previously stored resource, such as One For All, Fat Absorption, and Rewind. Horikoshi has revealed he based Neito on a real person.^{[vol. 4]} This was later revealed to be Dane DeHaan's performance as Harry Osborn/Green Goblin in The Amazing Spider-Man 2. For unknown reasons, Neito harbors an intense dislike of Class 1-A and occasionally comes up with plans for him or his class to upstage them. He has an inferiority complex, likely stemming from being told since he was young that his Quirk was that of a villain's, as "heroes don't steal Quirks". His manner of speaking is like that of Shishikura, as he tends to speak more eloquently than necessary, especially when addressing the students of Class 1-A, as shown in the Joint Training Arc. Despite his impressive analytical and tactical skills, one of his weaknesses is his poor scholarship, as he fails the Summer written exams, is forced to take part in remedial lessons during the Quirk Training Camp, and barely passes the Fall written exams.^{[LN 5]}

Itsuka Kendo (拳藤 一佳, Kendō Itsuka) / Battle Fist (バトルフィスト, Batoru Fisuto)
Voiced by: Saki Ogasawara (Japanese); Jad Saxton (English)

Itsuka Kendo, from Chiba Prefecture, is the spirited and sensible president of Class 1-B.^{[vol. 4, omake]} Her Quirk Big Fist (大拳/ビッグフィスト, Taiken/Biggufisuto) allows her to enlarge her fists, which was inspired by the Kamala Khan version of Ms. Marvel. Her creation may have also been inspired by Mister Fantastic, who has the same powers as Kamala. Itsuka is friendly to people outside her class and seems to hold no signs of ill will towards Class 1-A, making her a minority among the 1-B students. She is usually the one who keeps Monoma in check whenever his antics get out of line.^{[ep 62]} Itsuka has displayed sympathy towards others, even if she is far away. She shows concern for Izuku Midoriya and Tenya Ida after hearing about their run-in with Stain, and helps Class 1-A cheat by telling them what is on the First Term Final Exam's practical portion. She and Yaoyorozu have developed a friendly rivalry.^{[ep 95]}

Ibara Shiozaki (塩崎 茨, Shiozaki Ibara) / Vine (ヴァイン, Vain)
Voiced by: Miho Sakurazaka (Japanese); Bryn Apprill (English)

Ibara Shiozaki is a highly religious girl from Kanagawa Prefecture whose Quirk Vines (ブドウの木/ツル, Budō no ki/Tsuru) gives her a head of vines for hair that she can extend and use in combat. In an interview, Horikoshi stated that Ibara's hair was hard to draw.^{[vol. 4]} It was originally planned for her to be in Class 1-A. Ibara is modest and courteous, and behaves with humility after Present Mic calls her an assassin. Despite being graceful and soft-spoken, she is not afraid to make her intentions known. She is seemingly of a religious inclination, as she talks about heaven and divine beings on multiple occasions, and her combat tactics have somewhat religious names, such as Faith's Shield and Crucifixion. She shows her gratitude after receiving a second chance to take part in the U.A. Sports Festival and makes it her aim to spread good will before her fight with Denki. Denki has referred to her as "acorn-eyed", a slang term for someone with large, dark eyes.^{[ch. 35]} Notably, the only person Ibara ever deceives is Minoru, as she takes his headband during the Sports Festival and lies in order to lure him out during the Summer Training Camp.^{[LN 2]}

Tetsutetsu Tetsutetsu (鉄哲 徹鐵, Tetsutetsu Tetsutetsu) / Real Steel (リアルスティール, Riaru Sutīru)
Voiced by: Kōji Okino (Japanese); David Wald (English)

Tetsutetsu Tetsutetsu is a fiery and outspoken student from Saitama Prefecture whose Quirk Steel (鍛える/鋼鉄/鋼/スティール, Kitaeru/Kōtetsu/Hagane/Sutīru) allows him to turn his skin into steel. However, if he uses it for too long, he will suffer from iron fatigue, resulting in his metal form losing its durability. His Quirk is a reference to a junior version of Colossus. Horikoshi has stated that he likes Tetsutetsu's design and wants to draw more of him.^{[vol. 4]} Tetsutetsu is confident, stubborn, and straightforward in his motivations and actions. He is very vocal about his intentions and has a one-track mind, often looking for the simplest and most direct solution to problems. He appears to care deeply about his peers. He and Kirishima eventually develop a friendly rivalry because of their similar Quirks.^{[ep 22]} During battle, his direct personality shows through his tenacious and upfront fighting style. He does not attack the villains before ensuring Shiozaki's safety and does not hesitate to take a bullet for Kendo.^{[ch. 78–79]}

Juzo Honenuki (骨抜 柔造, Honenuki Jūzō) / Mudman (マッドマン, Maddoman)
Voiced by: Masamichi Kitada (Japanese); Dallas Reid (English)

Juzo Honenuki is a skull-faced boy from Kanagawa Prefecture whose Quirk Softening (軟化/柔化, Nanka/Jūka) enables him to soften anything that he touches. Juzo is one of the U.A. students who applied through the Recommendation Entrance Exam.^{[ch. 203]} He hates losing, but, like the rest of his class, does not feel bad letting others receive what they deserve, as shown when he lets his classmates continue losing at the Sports Festival. He is shown to have a calm demeanor when dealing with his classmates' antics, notably during the Joint Training Battle. When Tenya activates his Recipro Turbo, Juzo realizes that puts him at a grave disadvantage and retreats, showing his good judgment.^{[ep 96]}

Nirengeki Shoda (庄田 二連撃, Shōda Nirengeki) / Mines (マインズ, Mainzu)
Voiced by: Kenta Ōkuma (Japanese); Dallas Reid (English)

Nirengeki Shoda is a humble and apologetic boy from Tokyo whose Quirk Twin Impact (ツインインパクト, Tsuin Inpakuto) allows him to, at the site of an initial weapon impact, create a second impact, which he can activate at any time. Along with Ibara, Nirengeki was originally planned to be in Class 1-A. It is implied that, as the vice president of Class 1-B, his classmates trust him and find him reliable. He is described as Class 1-B's conscience, and appears to be more amicable and less competitive than his classmates. In battle, he is focused and collaborates well with others, as he works in unison with Reiko Yanagi and Yui Kodai. He also compliments Mina Ashido on her uppercut afterwards, implying that he is mature and does not hold grudges.^{[ch. 210]}

Yosetsu Awase (泡瀬 洋雪, Awase Yōsetsu) / Welder (ウェルダー, Werudā)
Voiced by: Yoshitsugu Matsuoka (Japanese); Orion Pitts (English)

Yosetsu Awase is a boy from Niigata Prefecture whose Quirk Weld (溶接する/溶接, Yōsetsu Suru/Yōsetsu) allows him to physically connect to anything he contacts. Yosetsu is also a reference to his first name. He is not as sociable as others; Yosetsu is foul-mouthed and tense, except in serious or life-or-death situations, wherein he becomes easily startled and more talkative while maintaining his harsh tone.^{[ch. 81]} He is selfless, as he continues to carry Yaoyorozu even though Chainsaw Nomu was catching up with them. He is willing to put himself in danger to fulfill a plan, despite showing fear. He has a crush on Momo.^{[GB p. 95]} While preparing for the School Festival, since Itsuka was busy with the Beauty Contest, Yosetsu is the one to knock out Neito Monoma for mocking Izuku and Class 1-A. He apologizes to Izuku, Eri, and Mirio Togata for Neito's behavior afterwards.^{[ep 83]}

Kosei Tsuburaba (円場 硬成, Tsuburaba Kōsei) / Tsubaraba (ツブラバ)
Voiced by: Masakazu Nishida (Japanese); Aaron Dismuke (Season 2–3), Nazeeh Tarsha (Season 5–present) (English)

Kosei Tsuburaba is a boy whose Quirk Solid Air (固体空気/空気凝固, Kotai Kūki/Kūkigyōko) enables him to solidify air into a wall or platform. He is from Kagawa Prefecture, making him the only person in his class to be from the Shikuoku region. Kosei is enthusiastic and competitive and holds himself to a high standard as he attempts to avoid descending to the level of his rivals. However, he is not above taunting Bakugo after stopping him with his Quirk. Like Neito Monoma, Kosei has no problem settling for less rather than aiming for the top.^{[ch. 30]} While Kosei is not the sort to attack offensively, he is described as a great backup player who uses his Quirk to aid others.^{[GB p. 87]} Kosei likes live-action television that features superheroes and uses special effects.^{[vol. 23, omake]}

Sen Kaibara (回原 旋, Kaibara Sen) / Spiral (スパイラル, Supairaru)
Voiced by: Masakazu Nishida (Japanese); Ian Fergunson (Season 2), Matt Shipman (Season 3–present) (English)

Sen Kaibara is a student from Tokyo whose Quirk Gyrate (回転する/旋回/ジャイレート, Kaiten Suru/Senkai/Jairēto) allows him to rotate any part of his body at incredibly high speeds, similar to a drill. Senkai is also a reference to his name. Sen is a levelheaded student who frequently is calm and focused. He is also more mature than Neito Monoma, telling the latter to quit provoking Katsuki Bakugo and focus on his goal during the Cavalry Battle.^{[ch. 29]} Despite his serious demeanor, Sen can sometimes show warmth, such as when he shows enthusiasm in fighting against Mashirao Ojiro during the Joint Training Arc.^{[ch. 203]} He is apt to be belligerent and often gets dragged along in his friends' antics. Sen is also described as an "ikeman", a good-looking man.^{[vol. 22]}

Kojiro Bondo (凡戸 固次郎, Bondo Kojirō) / Plamo (プラモ, Puramo)
Voiced by: Kōji Okino (Japanese); Tyler Walker (English)

Kojiro Bondo is a tall boy, made of rubber, from Tokyo, whose Quirk Cemedine (セメダイン, Semedain) enables him to excrete a glue-like liquid from the seven "eyeholes" on his glue dispenser-shaped head. He is described as a gentle giant and a "shrinking violet" compared to the rest of his classmates. He often stammers when speaking with his teammates during the Joint Training Arc, but despite this, he is easygoing and seems to get along well with his classmates, even Yui Kodai.^{[vol. 22, omake]}

Reiko Yanagi (柳 レイ子, Yanagi Reiko) / Emily (エミリー, Emirī)
Voiced by: Ayane Sakura (Japanese); Ryan Reynolds (English)

Reiko Yanagi is a mysterious girl from Aichi Prefecture whose Quirk Poltergeist (騒霊/ポルターガイスト, Sōrei/Porutāgaisuto) grants her the ability to telekinetically manipulate objects around her. Her hero name is a reference to the American horror/drama film The Exorcism of Emily Rose. She is quiet, seemingly emotionless, and often shows an odd body posture, wherein she keeps her elbows to her side and lets her hands dangle, which somewhat resembles ancient depictions of zombies, ghosts, and undead creatures, alluding to her Quirk. She can also be quite verbose, causing her classmates to simplify what she says to those not familiar with her. Reiko revealed she likes searching the internet for spooky stories.^{[vol. 23, omake]}

Jurota Shishida (宍田 獣郎太, Shishida Jūrōta) / Gevaudan (ジェボーダン, Jebōdan)
Voiced by: Junichi Suwabe (Japanese); Patric Carroll (English)

Jurota Shishida is a tall student from Akita Prefecture whose Quirk Beast (野獣/獣/ビースト/ケダモノ, Yajū/Kemono/Bīsuto/Kedamono) grants him the ability to transform into a monstrous beast. Jurota seems to be intelligent, as he has a verbose manner of speaking and often addresses others by respectful titles such as 'sir' and 'miss'. This is because he was brought up in a well mannered and doting family. While transformed, however, Jurota is rather boisterous and energetic, which is likely a side effect of his Quirk. He admires Hound Dog and wishes he could throw everything away like he does, but cannot because of his upbringing.^{[vol. 21, omake]} He is a reference to Henry Philip "Hank" McCoy/Beast.

Yui Kodai (小大 唯, Kodai Yui) / Rule (ルール, Rūru)
Voiced by: Yurianne Eve (Japanese); Madeleine Morris (English)

Yui Kodai is a quiet and unexpressive girl whose Quirk Size (大小/寸法/サイズ, Daishō/Sunpō/Saizu) enables her to change the size of any object she interacts with. She is from Shimane Prefecture, making her the only one in her class to be from the Chūgoku region. In early sketches drawn by Horikoshi, a prototype concept for Ochaco's original name and Quirk showed her drawn with a U.A. school uniform and hair that resembles her current style. Despite her silence, Yui is shown to care about her classmates during the Forest Training Camp Arc, when she looks after Juzo Honenuki and Ibara Shiozaki after they are knocked unconscious by Mustard's poisonous gas.^{[ch. 74]} She has revealed that she was unaware of a group of boys forming a fan club for her during her middle school years.^{[vol. 22, omake]}

Hiryu Rin (鱗 飛竜, Rin Hiryū; pinyin: Lín Fēilóng) / Dragon Shroud (龍帷子(ロンウェイヅゥ), Ron Wei Dzū; pinyin: Lóng Wéizǐ)
Voiced by: Kosuke Kuwano (Japanese); Anthony Bowling (English)

Hiryu Rin is a boy whose Quirk Scales (天秤座/天秤/鱗, Tiānchèngzuò/Tenbin/Uroko) enables him to form scales on his body for combat and other purposes. He was born in China, making him one of two Class 1-B students born outside of Japan. Hiryu is willing to work with others, as shown during the obstacle course when he suggests everyone use their Quirks together to clear the way through the fallen 0-point robots. He has a serious demeanor and the ability to turn his capabilities into action. He is diligent about his academic studies and in using his Quirk abilities. He has revealed that he dislikes winter since his Quirk makes it hard to keep himself warm.^{[vol. 21, omake]}

Kinoko Komori (小森 希乃子, Komori Kinoko) / Shemage (シーメイジ, Shīmeiji)
Voiced by: Kei Shindō (Japanese); Amanda Gish (English)

Kinoko Komori is a girl from Gunma Prefecture whose Quirk Mushroom (榎茸/マッシュルーム/キノコ, Enoki Dake/Masshurūmu/Kinoko) grants her the ability to create spores from her cells, allowing her to grow mushrooms on the surfaces of her surroundings. Her hero name was originally going to be "Gnocchi Nyokonyoko", but was changed because it was difficult to pronounce.^{[GB p. 73]} Her dream is to become an Idol Hero.^{[vol. 21]} In the Joint Training Battle, when her teammate Shihai Kuroiro's plan fails, Kinoko excitedly executes her part of the plan using her Mushroom Quirk, suggesting that her confidence has increased. After the battle, she is shown to have a kind side, as she apologizes to Fumikage Tokoyami for using her Quirk too much on him.^{[ep 95]} She also seems to be a fan of Hawks, as she asks Fumikage if he had any pictures of him in his private life.^{[ch. 217]}

Togaru Kamakiri (鎌切 尖, Kamakiri Togaru) / Jack Mantis (ジャックマンティス, Jakku Mantisu)
Voiced by: Kiyotaka Furushima (Japanese); Jean-Luc Hester (English)

Togaru Kamakiri is a student with a mantis-shaped head whose Quirk Razor Sharp (カミソリの鋭さ/刃鋭, Kamisori no Surudosa/Jin'ei) grants him the ability to produce large, sharp blades from all over his body. He is from Nagasaki Prefecture, making him the only student in his class to be from the Kyushu region. Horikoshi has stated that Togaru's design was influenced by Jean-Henri Fabre's Souvenirs entomologies and collected insects.^{[vol. 22]} Togaru is hot-blooded and aggressive, like Katsuki. He seems to have a passion for fighting against his enemies, as demonstrated by his desire to battle Class 1-A in the Joint Training Arc. Because of their similar personalities, Togaru views Katsuki as a personal rival.^{[ep 97]}

Pony Tsunotori (角取 ポニー, Tsunotori Ponī) / Rocketti (ロケッティ, Roketti)
Voiced by: Aoi Yūki (Japanese); Sarah Wiedenheft (English)

Pony Tsunotori is a timid girl whose Quirk Horn Cannon (角砲(ホーンキャノン)Hōnkyanon, Hōnhou) allows her to grow gazelle-like horns on her head. She was born in the United States, making her one of two Class 1-B students born outside of Japan; as a foreigner, she does not have much knowledge of Japanese. She is rather naïve and innocent, learning nasty phrases from Neito Monoma without realizing what they mean, as shown when Neito gives her phrases with which to unwittingly insult Class 1-A.^{[ch. 121]} When Pony gets angry or is thrown off by something, she speaks in English.^{[ch. 202]}^{[LN 5]} She has a bond with Manga Fukidashi over their love of anime and manga, with her classmates learning about anime and manga thanks to her.^{[GB p. 77]}

Setsuna Tokage (取蔭 切奈, Tokage Setsuna) / Lizardy (リザーディ, Rizādi)
Voiced by: Aoi Yūki (Japanese); Dawn M. Bennett (English)

Setsuna Tokage is a girl from Saitama Prefecture whose Quirk Lizard Tail Splitter (トカゲのしっぽ切り/トカゲテールスプリッター, Tokage no Shippokiri/Tokagetērusupurittā) allows her to split her body into several pieces and control them telekinetically. The Tokage part of Tokage no Shippokiri is a reference to her last name. She is one of the students of U.A. High School who applied through recommendations. She has been described as chatty, confident, and provocative, and is one of the few students in Class 1-B who apparently does not bear ill will toward Class 1-A. She is wily and thoughtful and has a great aptitude for leadership and cooperation. Her attitude is different in combat and non-combat situations, as she has a more serious disposition when in battle.^{[ch. 206]} Because of her strong personality and skills, Setsuna has total confidence in herself and her potential. She does not doubt or hesitate.^{[ch. 207]} Setsuna is noted to have been a gyaru when she was in middle school.^{[GB p. 79]}

Shihai Kuroiro (黒色 支配, Kuroiro Shihai) / Vantablack (ベンタブラック, Bentaburakku)
Voiced by: Kōhei Amasaki (Japanese); Howard Wang (English)

Shihai Kuroiro is a mysterious and cunning boy from Fukushima Prefecture whose Quirk Black (黒(ブラック)Kuro, Burakku) grants him the ability to merge into anything black-colored and control it. Shihai struggles to talk to girls and thinks they have a crush on him if they talk to him. The Ultra Analysis guidebook mentions that he has a crush on Kinoko,^{[GB p. 83]} whom he is seen standing jealously behind as she talks to Fumikage.^{[ep 100]} Due to his and Tokoyami's similar natures, they have developed a friendly rivalry.^{[vol. 21]}

Manga Fukidashi (吹出 漫我, Fukidashi Manga) / Comicman (コミックマン, Komikkuman)
Voiced by: Kaito Ishikawa (Japanese); Alex Mai (English)

Manga Fukidashi is a student with a speech bubble for a head whose Quirk Comic (漫画/コミック, Manga/Komikku) allows him to manifest different onomatopoeias into reality as katakana. Overusing his Quirk will cause him to suffer from a sore throat.^{[ch. 200]} He is from Wakayama Prefecture, making him the only student in his class to be from the Kansai region. He appears to be expressive, as is shown by his enthusiasm during the Cavalry Battle and Joint Training Session with Class 1-A. He also seems to have a soft spot for children, as he enjoys making them smile.^{[vol. 21]} He has a crush on Class 3-G student Bibimi Kenranzaki.^{[GB p. 93]}

=== The Big Three ===
The Big Three (ビッグ3, Biggu Surī) are third-year students who represent the top hero candidates of U.A. High School in terms of strength. They are widely known as the strongest three hero students in Japan. Shota Aizawa introduces them to Class 1-A following the second-term orientation; they are brought in to explain the Hero Work-Studies that students take part in on their own merit.^{[ch. 122–123]} Thanks to Hero Work-Studies, they have improved their skills and mastered their powerful Quirks at a young age. They are considered to be above Pro Hero levels. After the final battle against the League of Villains, they return to U.A. to have a proper graduation ceremony.^{[ch. 425]}

Mirio Togata (通形 ミリオ, Tōgata Mirio) / Lemillion (ルミリオン, Rumirion)
Voiced by: Tarusuke Shingaki, Wakana Minami (young) (Japanese); Ricco Fajardo, Megan Shipman (young) (English)

Mirio Togata is a third-year student at U.A. and the leader of the Big 3. His Quirk Permeation (浸出/浸潤/浸透/透過, Shinshutsu/Shinjun/Shintō/Tōka) allows him to phase his body through anything solid, including the ground.^{[ep 63]} He chose the hero name Lemillion because he wanted to help at least a million people. Horikoshi considers him to be an easy character to draw because of his simple facial features. Mirio appears to be goofy with a corny sense of humor, but is loyal to his cause. He is an optimist and is almost always smiling. His personality leads Sir Nighteye to believe he could succeed All Might as the Symbol of Peace.^{[ch. 127]} He is also brave and, in contrast to his laid-back nature, is experienced in dealing with dangerous people and is not easily scared. He is shown talking to Overhaul in his normal, cheerful manner, despite knowing about his background as a dangerous yakuza member.^{[ep 67]} Mirio is also confident during battle, as he is bold enough to face four of the Shie Hassaikai members alone.^{[ch. 124, 150]} He loses his Quirk during the Shie Hassaikai Raid, but thanks to Eri, he eventually regains his powers and arrives in time to help the other heroes in their battle with the Final War Arc.^{[ep 125]} In My Hero Academia: You're Next, he is seen to be using his abilities when he has not revealed the reason. This occurs before the Final War, which is when he truly shown to have his abilities back. During the events of the final chapter, which occurred eight years later, Mirio had already become Japan's new number one hero.^{[ch. 430]}

Tamaki Amajiki (天喰 環, Amajiki Tamaki) / Suneater (サンイーター, San'ītā)
Voiced by: Yūto Uemura (Japanese); Aaron Dismuke, Apphia Yu (young) (English)

Tamaki Amajiki is a third-year student at U.A. His Quirk Manifest (見かけ上/はっきりした/明らかにする/再現/マニフェスト, Mikake-jō/Hakkiri Shita/Akiraka ni Suru/Saigen/Manifesuto) gives him the characteristics of anything he eats. Ironically, despite his talent with his Quirk, Amajiki suffers from social anxiety and has low self-esteem. According to Horikoshi, Tamaki's anxiety was inspired by his own experiences attending the Jump Festa in 2017, when he had to face an enormous crowd. Tamaki is shy, aloof, depressed, and introverted, especially in front of large crowds. He gets nervous easily when talking to other people, and will often face away and lean into a wall to hide his face from others.^{[ch. 123]} This also happens whenever he has bad feelings or feels insulted.^{[ch. 133]} When he was in middle school, Tamaki did not make any friends because he was considered to be a boring person. However, Mirio approached him after realizing he was trying to say he liked Heroes, and the two began their friendship. After being inspired by Mirio's bravery during the yakuza raid, Tamaki steps up to the challenge of facing three villains alone, so the others can complete the mission. During the battle, Tamaki pushes himself to his limits to uphold the expectations set by Fat Gum, Mirio, and others who believe in him. Tamaki voiced his disapproval to Overhaul of the way Toya Setsuno, Yu Hojo, and Soramitsu Tabe consider themselves expendable, but he appears to well understand the bond between allies.^{[ep 71]}

Nejire Hado (波動 ねじれ, Hadō Nejire) / Nejire Chan (ねじれちゃん, Nejire Chan)
Voiced by: Kiyono Yasuno (Japanese); Lindsay Seidel (English)

Nejire Hado is a third-year student at U.A. Her Quirk Wave Motion (波動/うねり, Hadō/Uneri) allows her to convert her stamina into energy and release it as spiral shockwaves; overusing it will cause her to suffer from exhaustion and lose stamina. Horikoshi stated he struggled to draw her long hair, which later gets cut after it gets burned by Dabi during the war. Nejire is enthusiastic, affable, and curious. She is also compassionate.^{[ep 87]} However, she has shown a more stoic nature in certain situations. She is not very concerned for Tamaki after learning of his attack, and takes part in Beauty Pageant during the U.A. School Festival, having lost the first two times to Class 3-G student Bibimi Kenranzaki,^{[ch. 173]} before winning the third and final time.^{[ch. 183]} Despite her happy-go-lucky personality, Nejire is fierce in battle; but when the situation calls for it, she can be calm and focused. Her compassion never seems to extend to the enemy, and she always maintains her focus on taking them down. During her battle against Tomura and High-Ends, Nejire shows great judgement and anger, a side which she rarely displays. Her strong heart has allowed her to climb the ranks and become one of U.A.'s top three students.^{[ch. 294–295]}

=== Other students ===
Mei Hatsume (発目 明, Hatsume Mei)
Voiced by: Azu Sakura (Japanese); Alexis Tipton (English)

Mei Hatsume is a creative first-year Support Course student from Class 1-H whose Quirk Zoom (ズーム, Zūmu) allows her to zoom in to objects up to 5 kilometers away.^{[ep 21]} Mei was originally a male character, but Horikoshi stated in the 35th chapter of the manga that he changed this because he thought it would be more interesting if he made the character female. Mei loves creating gadgets, which she refers to as her "super cute babies", although her creations often explode. She has a habit of "going straight to the point"^{[ch. 27]} and is shameless in advertising her inventions. She is seemingly absent-minded, as she is easily distracted and can sometimes be unaware of her surroundings, as shown by her inability to sense one of her inventions catching on fire as she was speaking with Izuku.^{[ch. 101]} She is seemingly inept at reading body language and social cues, as she is frequently oblivious to Izuku's discomfort when she is near. Mei's Power Suit invention is a reference to a prototype battle suit created by Justin Hammer in Iron Man 2, which seemingly killed its test pilot. Izuku is also almost killed, but Mei disables the suit before he is hurt.

Hitoshi Shinso (心操 人使, Shinsō Hitoshi)/ NightHide (ナイトハイド, Naitohaido)
Voiced by: Wataru Hatano (Japanese); Jarrod Greene (English)

Hitoshi Shinso is a first-year student from the General Course whose Quirk Brainwashing (洗脳, Sen'nō) allows him to control those who answers him. Hitoshi's purple hair and mental abilities were inspired by Purple Man. At first, Hitoshi struggles with his Quirk, as it is a "villainous" Quirk despite his heroic intentions. Hitoshi desires to become a Pro Hero to refute those who made him feel ashamed of his abilities.^{[ch. 34]} While he has stated he is not interested in making friends, he knows several students who see him as a friend, including Izuku, Denki, and Neito. After proving his potential to be a capable hero at the school festival, Hitoshi is taken in as Eraser Head's apprentice. He trains for Eraser Head's fighting style but struggles to develop the use of the Capturing Weapon. After several months of training, he comes to use his ability properly, showing his skill in the Joint Training Battle.^{[ep 92]} Eventually, he earns the right to transfer to the Hero Course for his second year^{[ch. 216]} which he does, joining Izuku and the others in class 2-A after Yuga's departure.^{[ch. 425]}

== Pro Heroes ==
The Pro Heroes (プロヒーロー, Puro Hīrō) are those who are licensed to use their Quirks to protect the civilians and save the world from the villains, natural disasters, or any other kind of harm. The overall hero activity is managed by the World Heroes Association.

To become a Pro Hero, the students in U.A. High School must work as interns through Hero Agencies.^{[ch. 48]} The students can also take part in Hero-Work Studies under the guidance of a Pro Hero, and the permission to fight the villains in emergency situations, by passing the exam for the Provisional Hero License.^{[ch. 114]}

In the aftermath of the Paranormal Liberation War, many Pro Heroes have retired or quit due to the massive destruction left by Gigantomachia's rampage and the prison breakouts by All For One's escape from Tartarus, causing them to receive excessive criticism from the public especially where they were vandalized by the anti-hero protestors.^{[ch. 300]}

=== Top Heroes ===
Enji Todoroki (轟 炎司, Todoroki Enji) / Endeavor (エンデヴァー, Endevā)
Voiced by: Tetsu Inada (Japanese); Patrick Seitz (English)

Enji Todoroki is a hotheaded and stern hero whose Quirk Hellflame (ヘルフレイム, Heru Fureimu) gives him powerful pyrokinetic abilities. He himself is immune to flames and can easily control the shape and temperature of a blaze.^{[ep 30]} As a Pro Hero, Enji is depicted as confident, reliable, and imposing, thanks to his excellent track record of solving cases. His rude and aggressive personality is well known to the public, with his fans thinking of that as a selling point while others are scared by his overall violent attitude.^{[ch. 115]} His obsessive drive to surpass All Might in terms of strength and power has followed Enji throughout his entire life, with repeated failures having plagued him since his youth. Dedicated to his studies and hero work, Enji strives to become the absolute strongest Pro Hero in the country, but the figure of All Might proved itself too much of an insurmountable obstacle for him or anyone else to overcome, leaving Enji in a growing state of despair as he becomes more and more aware of the impossibility closing the gap between him and the Symbol of Peace.^{[ep 49]} Even though he dislikes his longtime rival All Might, Enji still respects his power and feats as the No. 1 Hero, to the point of not believing that the "real" All Might was a sick and weak-looking man.^{[ch. 93]} Enji is the husband of Rei Himura and the father of Shoto and his three older siblings. Enji has a strained relationship with his wife and children due to having projected his obsession of surpassing All Might on them, particularly on his sons Toya and Shoto. However, after becoming Japan's No. 1 hero following All Might's forced retirement, Enji starts to realize his mistakes and resolves to make amends to his family. During the series epilogue, Enji begins using a wheelchair as a result of his injuries from the war, forcing him to retire and focusing on a new goal of making amends for his own past misdeeds against his family, which includes regularly visiting Toya at the prison.^{[ch. 426]}

Keigo Takami (鷹見 啓悟, Takami Keigo) / Hawks (ホークス, Hōkusu)
Voiced by: Yuichi Nakamura (Japanese); Zeno Robinson (English)

Keigo Takami is an affable, relaxed, and optimistic hero whose Quirk, Fierce Wings (激しい翼/剛翼, Hageshī Tsubasa/Gōyoku) grants him a pair of red feathered wings that allow him to fly at high speed. He can also detach his feathers to use as blades and telekinetically control them from a distance.^{[ch. 187]} Keigo's design was inspired by Takahiro, a character from Oumagadoki Zoo (逢魔ヶ刻動物園, Ōmagadoki Dōbutsuen), one of Kōhei Horikoshi's previous works. He is the first and highest-ranking Pro Hero to not attend the U.A. High School; instead, the Hero Public Safety Commission decided to train him before he rose up to the top ranks of Pro Heroes. During the interview on the Honyasan mobile app, Hawks' backstory was mentioned by the manga editor Yoritomi, who revealed that it is based on the soccer player Lionel Messi's childhood life. Keigo is shown to be highly intelligent, both emotionally and logistically. He projects a carefree and jovial attitude, while his constant vigilance often hides under his outward serenity and equanimity. He follows the orders of the Hero Public Safety Commission without hesitation, but with subliminated cynicism. Nevertheless, Keigo dislikes formalities, often acting unpredictably while being cocky and taunting.^{[ch. 243]} On orders from the Hero Commission, Hawks infiltrates the Paranormal Liberation Front as a double agent and gains the trust of the villains within the organization, especially Twice. After he is outed as a double agent, Hawks is severely burned by Dabi but is later rescued by Tokoyami.^{[ep 118]} He later leads the final battle against All For One alongside Endeavor but is later defeated and loses his quirk to the latter. In the epilogue, he retires from heroism due to the loss of his quirk and became the new president of the Hero Public Safety Commission, focusing on building a better hero society than the last commission.

Tsunagu Hakamada (袴田 維, Hakamada Tsunagu) / Best Jeanist (ベストジー二スト, Besuto Jīnisuto)
Voiced by: Hikaru Midorikawa (Japanese); Micah Solusod (English)

Tsunagu Hakamata is a flamboyant and elegant hero whose Quirk Fiber Master (ファイバーマスター, Faibā Masutā) allows him to freely control fiber in clothes. He is the recipient of the "Best Jeanist" award for eight consecutive years.^{[ch. 3]} Tsunagu believes very strongly that people with influence must maintain a positive appearance both physically and socially. He often uses metaphors referencing jeans, denim, and uses various other fabric-based phrases, often inspiring his recruits with speeches, telling them to keep their life straight like their jeans.^{[ep 31]} He admits to not being fond of brutish individuals such as Katsuki Bakugo,^{[ch. 48]} whose attitude he attempted to correct, only to be frustrated by the young man's stubbornness.^{[ch. 86]} He loses a lung in his brief battle with All For One and is seemingly killed by Hawks to gain the trust of the League of Villains. However, this is later revealed to be a ruse and Best Jeanist ultimately returns alive and well after Hawks is exposed as a double agent.^{[ep 124]}In the Final War arc, he is fighting alongside with Mirko, Suneater, Nejire, Bakigo, Edgeshot and Deku in The Coffin in the Sky. When Bakugo dies in the fight due to a severe injury to his major organs, Best Jeanist attempts to resurrect Bakugo with Edgeshot, using his quirk to control clothing fibres in attempt to stop bleeding.

Rumi Usagiyama (兎山 ルミ, Usagiyama Rumi) / Mirko (ミルコ)
Voiced by: Sayaka Kinoshita (Japanese); Anairis Quiñones (English)

Rumi Usagiyama is a tough and aggressive heroine whose Quirk Rabbit (兎/うさぎ, Usagi) gives her rabbit-like features, such as superhuman leg strength and big rabbit-like ears. According to the 20th volume of the manga, Horikoshi noted that Rumi's hero name was inspired by the former professional mixed martial arts fighter Mirko "Cro Cop" Filipović. Rumi hates to be left out of action, and seems to believe that heroes who join teams are cowards, as they could only be relying on their teammates' strength rather than their own.^{[ch. 184]} As a Pro Hero, she proves to be fearless and independent, freely traversing Japan while bravely facing any villain that she comes across. The guidebook shows that she only works alone, instead of working in the agency or affiliated with some other institution.^{[GB p. 188]} Despite her brash demeanor, Rumi is not above assisting others, such as when she came to the aid of Endeavor and Hawks after seeing their battle with Hood on the news.^{[ch. 191]} She also requested Endeavor's help on one occasion while fighting a villain, showing that she is not unwilling to ask for help from other heroes despite her solitary disposition.^{[LN 5]} During the Jaku Hospital Raid, she is severely wounded by several High-End Nomus and ends up losing part of her right ear with her left forearm and right leg, after losing them, being replaced with interchangeable protheses.

Crust (クラスト, Kurasuto)
Voiced by: Tsuguo Mogami (Japanese); Larry Brantley (English)

Crust is an emotional and noble hero whose Quirk Shield (被う/覆う/匿/盾/シールド, Ōu/Ōu/Nì/Tate/Shīrudo) allows him to grow stone-like, hexagon-shaped shields from his body. Crust was crying out of sorrow for All Might's retirement and crying in regret for not being involved in the Kamino Incident.^{ep 87} During the Jaku Hospital Raid, he saves Eraser Head's life at the cost of his own, being killed by the effects of Tomura Shigaraki's Quirk.^{[ch. 272]}

Susugu Mitarai (御手洗 濯, Mitarai Susugu) / Wash (ウォッシュ, Wosshu)
Voiced by: Hiro Shimono (Japanese); Alese Watson-Johnson (English)

Susugu Mitarai is the current No. 8 Pro Hero. His costume resembles a washing machine and leaves only his large eyes visible. He hires Koji and Manga for their internship. His Quirk Clean Bubbler (クリーンボブル, Kurīn Boburu) allows him to create and control soapy water.

Yoroi Musha (ヨロイムシャ, Yoroimusha)
Voiced by: Yasuhiro Fujiwara (Japanese); Bill Jenkins (English)

Equipped Hero: Yoroi Musha is an elderly man who was originally the No. 9 Pro Hero. Following the backlash against the Pro Heroes in the aftermath of the Paranormal Liberation War, which he was involved in, Yoroi Musha was among those who announced their retirements.^{[ch. 184]}

Ryuko Tatsuma (竜間 龍子, Tatsuma Ryūko) / Ryukyu (リューキュウ, Ryūkyū)
Voiced by: Kaori Yagi (Japanese); Katelyn Barr (English)

Ryuko Tatsuma is a humble and gentle heroine who takes Nejire, Uraraka, and Tsuyu as her interns. Her Quirk Dragon (竜/ドラゴン, Ryū/Doragon) enables her to transform into a European dragon. Ryuko seems to have a soft spot for children, as shown by her caring for and tutoring her trainees. She was also saddened upon learning that Overhaul was using his own "daughter" to create Quirk-Destroying Drugs and made it clear to the other heroes that rescuing Eri should be their top priority.^{[ch. 135]} Her humble side is further highlighted when she considers herself the only one responsible for dropping to the tenth spot on the Japanese Hero Billboard Chart, and admitting that she could have done better after failing to save a civilian.^{[ep 87]}

Kugo Sakamata (逆俣 空悟, Sakamata Kūgo) / Gang Orca (ギャングオルカ, Gyangu Oruka)
Voiced by: Shuhei Matsuda (Japanese); Tyler Walker (English)

Kugo Sakamata is a Pro Hero whose Quirk Orcinus (オルキヌス/シャチ, Orukinusu/Shachi) gives him the abilities and appearance of a killer whale, which he can use in the water or on land. He appears to be a calm and focused hero who treats every situation seriously. He is friendly and a good comrade towards his fellow Pro Heroes. He was relieved that Tiger was able to rescue his ally and calmed him when he was worried about her condition.^{[ch. 88]} He also teased Best Jeanist on being unable to change Katsuki Bakugo's personality and reform his crude attitude.^{[ch. 86]} He played the antagonist during the second phase of the Provisional Hero License Exam. He is not above calling out the students on their mistakes. Despite his hard exterior, Gang Orca admits that he enjoys seeing the students redeeming themselves.^{[ch. 113]} However, he was very rude and belittling to the students who failed the licensing exam. Despite his harsh words and his menacing demeanor, he does really care about the students put under his care and desires to help motivate them so they can become heroes with heart.^{[ep 80]}

=== Faculty of U.A. ===
Toshinori Yagi (八木 俊典, Yagi Toshinori) / All Might (オールマイト, Ōru Maito)
Voiced by: Kenta Miyake (Anime), Tesshō Genda (Vomic) (Japanese); Christopher Sabat (English)

Toshinori Yagi is the eighth holder of the Quirk One For All and the world's greatest hero, also known as the Symbol of Peace (平和の象徴, Heiwa no Shōchō). In drawing All Might, Horikoshi stated that the frontal shot of the character was extremely taxing due to having an excessive amount of shading present in his design.^{[vol. 1]} He was inspired by a combination of Superman and Captain America. All Might's habit of smiling was ingrained by his mentor, Nana Shimura, who believed that the ones who smile are the ones who are the strongest. Though he can be annoying at times, Toshinori is usually friendly and amicable, always taking time to interact with fans. During his time as a hero, the true details of All Might's Quirk were kept secret, to the point where it was one of the world's greatest mysteries. Whenever asked about it in interviews, he would simply tell a joke and dodge the question. He is very charismatic and has a fatherly attitude towards his students, especially Izuku. Also, much like Izuku, he was born Quirkless. He is considered to be a non-drinker, likely due to him lacking a stomach as well as health reasons related to his injury.^{[LN 3]} Due to a crippling injury that he sustained from his first fight with All For One in the past, he ultimately selects Izuku as his successor. Whenever he addresses a student, as well as speaking out loud or thinking to himself, he has a habit to prefixing "young" to the student's surname: for example, Young Midoriya.^{[ch. 3]} As a U.A. teacher, he can sometimes underestimate his students and is outsmarted as a result. Lacking teaching experience, he required a script to convey his first lesson to Class 1-A. He is also reprimanded on occasion by his fellow teacher, Eraser Head, for being sometimes unavailable from his teaching duties. However, All Might bringing his typical attitude into his teaching can be beneficial, creating an energetic and motivating environment.^{[ch. 7]} During the Final Exams Arc, out of all the teachers, he is the most ruthless so far. He can theatrically play a villain, doing so to bring out the full potential of others with tough love. His sheer intimidation alone was, according to Izuku, similar to that of Stain. When Katsuki stated that he would rather lose than seek Izuku's assistance, All Might was more than willing to force Katsuki to lose. He also punched Katsuki hard enough for him to vomit, showing he will not hold back and is willing to injure his students if that motivates them to pass the exams.^{[ep 37]} After winning his rematch with All For One, All Might loses the ability to use One For All completely and dedicates himself to raising Izuku to eventually take his place as the world's greatest hero.

Nezu (根津)
Voiced by: Yasuhiro Takato (Japanese); Jerry Jewell (English)

Nezu is a humanoid, mouse-headed animal who serves as the principal of U.A High. He is one of the few non-human animals in history to develop a Quirk. His Quirk High Spec (ハイスペック, Hai Supekku) gives him anthropomorphic abilities and superhuman intelligence. Sometime before becoming U.A. High's principal, Nezu was experimented on by humans. This mistreatment led to Nezu developing a sadistic side to his otherwise polite personality. He eventually became the principal of U.A. High and hired Shota Aizawa as a teacher, who asked the principal for the ability to expel and re-enroll students, feeling that they should know the difference between self-sacrifice and throwing one's life away, so that they strive more. Nezu was unsure about Shota's proposition, but accepted it.^{[ch. 254]} As a result of abuse and mistreatment by humans in the past, Nezu's true character reveals itself whenever he is in combat. He enjoys "toying" with humans, especially Denki Kaminari and Mina Ashido. He still holds a grudge over the many experiments he underwent, coming off as slightly insane and unpredictable as a result.^{[ch. 66]} His dedication to educating goes as far as assessing villains, especially young ones, and wondering if they could be put on the right path if they were taught properly, although he admits the naivety of the idea. He is told about the secret of One For All by All Might, so Nezu suggested looking for a successor by giving All Might the opportunity to take up a teaching position at U.A. High.^{[ep 62]}

Shota Aizawa (相澤 消太, Aizawa Shōta) / Eraser Head (イレイザーヘッド, Ireizā Heddo)

Voiced by: Junichi Suwabe (Japanese); Alex Organ (Season 1), Christopher Wehkamp (Seasons 2–8) (English)

Shota Aizawa is the pragmatic and lethargic homeroom teacher of Class 1-A. His Quirk Erasure (抹殺/消去/抹消, Massatsu/Shōkyo/Masshō) enables him to nullify another person's Quirk within his line of vision until he blinks. He can use his Quirk on multiple targets; it remains active, even if he looks elsewhere, as long as he does not blink. Because he suffers from dry eye and his Quirk tends to strain his eyes, Eraser Head is somewhat irritable and has a constantly tired appearance. Shota is loosely based on the DC Comics hero Batman. Unlike the original Batman and Joker, who have clashing personalities and worldviews, he and Ms. Joke get along well. He is a very stern and reserved man who has lofty expectations of his students. He often comes off as cold, apathetic, and impatient, exerting very little energy in most situations, preferring to take naps in his sleeping bag instead.^{[ep 9]} As a teacher with notoriously high expectations, Shota is known to expel students he feels are not suited for U.A. High. However, it was revealed that the high expulsion rate is only on paper and that he actually re-enrolls the students he expels.^{[ch. 254]} When he and Izuku Midoriya first met, he had zero faith in Izuku's ability to become a hero. He referred to him as a "problem child" due to Izuku's habit of causing trouble and putting himself in danger. Since then, he has come to respect Izuku, though he is still strict with him. Despite his personality, Shota has shown on several occasions that he is not completely devoid of joy; he often grins whenever he is impressed by one of his students^{[ch. 6, 63]} or after he tricks them with one of his 'rational deceptions'.^{[ch. 7, 68]} His time before being a teacher is seen in his recurring role in My Hero Academia: Vigilantes, in which he deals with street crime in Naruhata and often works alongside the Crawler.^{[VGLS ch. 2]}^{[VGLS ch. 67]} Eraser Head gained a scar below one of his eyes fighting a Nomu that accompanied Tomura, Kurogiri, and their underlings in their attack on the Unforeseen Simulation Joint.^{[ch. 16]} During the Jaku Hospital Raid, Tomura throws one of Overhaul's Quirk-destroying bullets into Eraser Head's right leg, forcing him to amputate it on the spot to prevent himself from losing his Quirk.^{[ch. 281]}

Hizashi Yamada (山田 ひざし, Yamada Hizashi) / Present Mic (プレゼントマイク, Purezento Maiku)
Voiced by: Hiroyuki Yoshino (Japanese); Sonny Strait (Eps. 1–16), Dave Trosko (Eps. 17–170) (English)

Hizashi Yamada is the school's English teacher whose Quirk Voice (言い表す/音声/声/ヴォイス/ボイス, Iiarawasu/Onsei/Koe/Voisu/Boisu) amplifies his voice from a boombox-like collar. In the anime, Present Mic occasionally breaks the fourth wall by explaining a character's Quirk. The character's real name was based on a Japanese radio host named Hisashi Yamada, who hosts "Hisashi Yamada's Radi-Unlimited" on Tokyo FM. Hizashi was originally going to be a fat, bald old man who hosts the school orientation ceremony. However, Horikoshi thought that that was boring; instead he made him more excited. Hizashi often poses when he talks and maintains a certain level of excitement or volume, regardless of the situation. His attitude made Kyoka Jiro mistake him for a simple announcer, rather than an actual Pro Hero.^{[ch. 61]} When in front of a crowd of people, he often attempts to bring his audience up to his level by getting them involved (he sometimes refers to them as his 'listeners', even while on a live stage). He continues to act this way regardless of the crowds' response, as shown during the Sports Festival.^{[ep 21]} He also volunteers to commentate rather than sitting through a boring event such as during the Remedial Hero License Training.^{[ep 79]} Though he tends to be a jovial individual, Hizashi is capable of great rage, as demonstrated by his reaction to discovering that Kurogiri is a Nomu created from the corpse of his late friend, Oboro Shirakumo and his confrontation with the man responsible, Kyudai Garaki. He expressed further grief and outrage over how the doctor's scientific gifts and knowledge could have helped humanity, instead of being used for evil. Much later, he angrily punches the doctor for what he did to his friend.^{[ch. 260, 269]}

Sekijiro Kan (管 赤慈郎, Kan Sekijirō) / Vlad King (ブラドキング, Burado Kingu)
Voiced by: Shuhei Matsuda (Japanese); Ben Bryant (English)
Sekijiro Kan is Class 1-B's homeroom teacher. His Quirk Blood Control (血液管理/操血, Ketsueki Kanri/Sōketsu) allows him to control his blood after it leaves his body. He can spread the blood out to form a variety of constructs. As a teacher, Vlad King has a caring attitude towards his students. He is willing to go out of his way to protect them and encourages them to do their absolute best. He also views Class 1-A as rivals but also values their growth and safety. He often uses them to motivate his own class to reach greater and greater heights. Although he cares for Class 1-A's well-being, Sekijiro has shown to have a bias towards his class, as shown in the Joint Training Arc.^{[ch. 196]} He is one of the few people who knew about All Might's true form. He has been friends with Hound Dog for a long time.^{[GB p. 189]} Despite being two years younger than Ryo Inui, Sekijiro attended the same class at U.A. High with him, being in the same class event, a drag café. This may imply that either Ryo was held back or Sekijiro has skipped grades.^{[LN 4]}
Chiyo Shuzenji (修善寺 治与, Shūzenji Chiyo) / Recovery Girl (リカバリーガール, Rikabarī Gāru)
Voiced by: Etsuko Kozakura (Japanese); Juli Erickson (Season 1), Luci Christian (Seasons 2–8) (English)

Chiyo Shuzenji is the elderly school nurse whose Quirk Heal (治る/治す/癒す/回復, Naoru/Naosu/Iyasu/Kaifuku) allows her to heal others' injuries by kissing them. Chiyo has worked at U.A. for over forty years and her words hold just as much authority as that of Principal Nezu's. Horikoshi describes her as the mainstay of the school.^{[vol. 8]} Chiyo has a kind and compassionate personality, where she treats everyone kindly, as she is usually shown giving her patients sweets to help their energy levels rise from her Quirk's stamina draining effects. Despite this, she does have a strict and reproachful attitude towards foolish behavior that can lead to injuries. She is mostly like this with All Might for not teaching Izuku Midoriya on how to use his Quirk properly or with Izuku for using his Quirk recklessly and injuring himself in the process. She eventually refuses to heal Izuku's injuries caused by One For All to prevent it from becoming habitual, and encourages Izuku to find another way to master his Quirk's power without leading to self-injury.^{[ch. 41]} She can also be quite harsh and critical, as when she rebuked Present Mic for being defeated by a swarm of bugs during his practical battle in the First Term Final Exam, despite his entomophobia.^{[ch. 66]}

Nemuri Kayama (香山 睡, Kayama Nemuri) / Midnight (ミッドナイト, Middonaito)
Voiced by: Akeno Watanabe (Japanese); Elizabeth Maxwell (English)

Nemuri Kayama is a dominatrix-themed Pro Heroine and a modern art history teacher at U.A. whose Quirk Somnambulist (夢遊病者/眠り香, Muyūbyō-sha/Nemurika) allows her to produce a sleep-inducing fragrance from her body. Midnight was originally planned as the homeroom teacher of Class 1-A, but Horikoshi decided to give the role to Shota Aizawa because the author preferred someone who could be sharp-tongued with the kids. She is a very playful and flirtatious woman with an unpredictably serious and temperamental side to her. She gets angry whenever someone interrupts her or when they insult her, and she is especially sensitive about her age. Midnight has no shame about dressing or acting sexually in front of young students and appears to act on whim much of the time. When she accepted Mashirao Ojiro and Nirengeki Shoda's request to resign from the tournament, she commented that their naivety "turned her on".^{[ch. 32]} She was also very excited to see the chivalry displayed by Eijiro Kirishima during the tournament when he shook Tetsutetsu Tetsutetsu's hand.^{[ep 22]} During the First Term Final Exams, Midnight admitted to Minoru Mineta that she has a sadistic side and enjoys dominating others. She can be impressed by those who resort to genius plans, as she was amazed by Minoru using tactical thinking.^{[ep 36]} She was also a recurring character in the Vigilantes manga spin-off,^{[VGLS ch. 5]} having formed a strong friendship with Kazuho Haneyama/Pop☆Step. Midnight is killed during the Paranormal Liberation War during her attempt to defeat Gigantomachia.^{[ep 125]}

Ken Ishiyama (石山 堅, Ishiyama Ken) / Cementoss (セメントス, Sementosu)
Voiced by: Kenta Ōkuma (Japanese); Chris Rager (English)

Ken Ishiyama is a Pro Hero and literature teacher at U.A. whose Quirk Cement (凝る/痼る/セメント, Koru/Shikoriru/Semento) allows him to control concrete. Cementoss is a serious yet pleasant individual. He is very careful of the well-being of others. He is a big fan of All Might, despite being a Pro Hero himself. Like the rest of the professors at the U.A. High, he knows All Might's secret identity, and he tried his best to prevent others from discovering it.^{[ep 13]} During the fight between Izuku and Shoto, Cementoss contacts Midnight and asks her if they should stop their fight because of Izuku's recklessness.^{[ep 23]} During the Jaku Hospital Raid, Cementoss defeats Geten. He is immediately sent to the hospital after the Paranormal Liberation War.^{[ch. 296]}

Anan Kurose (黒瀬 亜南, Kurose Anan) / Thirteen (13号, Jūsan-gō)
Voiced by: Inuko Inuyama (Japanese); Morgan Berry (English)

Anan Kurose is a Pro Hero specializing in search and rescue, and is a teacher at U.A. Her Quirk Black Hole (ブラックホール, Burakku Hōru) allows her to summon a black hole, with her fingers, that turns anything it sucks in into dust. She wears a full-body spacesuit that conceals her features. In a prototype concept, Thirteen was initially named No. 6 while her real name would have been Hirooki Anakuro (穴黒央宙, Anakuro Hirooki). She is a wise, well-mannered woman. As a rescue hero, Thirteen has shown how passionate she is about saving people through her teachings. She even developed her own training facility named the Unforeseen Simulation Joint, which is used to train future heroes in search-and-rescue tactics.^{[ch. 13]} She has also been shown to be very brave. Despite not being a combat type, she does not hesitate to use her Quirk to fight against villains for the sake of protecting others. During the Paranormal Liberation War, Thirteen lost her left arm to Tomura's attack. Despite her injuries, Thirteen and other surviving heroes tried to prevent Tomura/All For One from escaping with a handful of allies and Nomus, but they were unsuccessful.^{[ch. 296]}

Ectoplasm (エクトプラズム, Ekutopurazumu)
Voiced by: Masakazu Nishida (Japanese); Mike McFarland (English)

Ectoplasm is a Pro Hero and math teacher at U.A. whose Quirk Clones (クローン人間/分身/クローン, Kurōn Ningen/Bunshin/Kurōn) allows him to spew out an ectoplasm-like dust from his helmet, dust that can form into a clone of himself. Ectoplasm is a steadfast and unrelenting hero, which has made him highly popular.^{[vol. 7, omake]} As a teacher, he desires the best from his students and is not afraid to push them; he openly warned Fumikage Tokoyami and Tsuyu Asui that he would do his best to crush them during their final exams. He also told them that he was looking for his students to shine under pressure. After the two passed the exam, Ectoplasm releases the students from the giant clone and commends them on their clever synergy.^{[ch. 61, 66]}

Snipe (スナイプ, Sunaipu)
Voiced by: Tōru Nara (Japanese); David Wald (English)

Snipe is a gas mask–wearing Pro Hero and teacher at U.A. whose Quirk Homing (帰途/帰宅/ホーミング, Kito/Kitaku/Hōmingu) allows him to alter the trajectory of his bullets. He is dressed in cowboy-like clothes. He is also in charge of the third-year students.^{[GB p. 128]} As the head of U.A.'s senior students in the Hero Course, Snipe shows himself to be intelligent and knowledgeable when it comes to battle practice, as he points out that having the first year students face robots during the Final Exams would not help them when they encounter live villains in the future.^{[ch. 61]} While often calm, he is shown to be excitable upon realising he accidentally bumped Toru Hagakure's chest with his elbow during his Final Exam battle, and frantically apologized to her.^{[ep 36]}

Higari Maijima (埋島 干狩, Maijima Higari) / Power Loader (パワーローダー, Pawārōdā)
Voiced by: Yō Kitazawa (Japanese); David Wilson-Brown (English)

Higari Maijima is a Pro Hero and the support-course teacher at U.A. whose Quirk Iron Claws (鉄爪/アイアンクロー, Tessō/Aiankurō) gives him metallic claws at the ends of his fingers, which allow him to dig and burrow underground. Horikoshi found out that drawing Higari's costume/armor was quite difficult. He describes the character as a prodigy who can create support items with self-assurance.^{[vol. 12]} Because of his being a strict teacher who desires to see his students excel without constraint, Power Loader has developed a love-hate relationship with Mei Hatsume. Although he is easily angered by her carelessness, he still acknowledges her inventiveness and productivity.^{[ch. 101]}

Ryo Inui (犬井 猟, Inui Ryō) / Hunting Dog Hero Hound Dog (猟犬ヒーローハウンドドッグ, Ryōken Hīrō Haundodoggu)
Voiced by: Eiji Hanawa (Japanese); Zach Bolton (English)

Ryo Inui is a Pro Hero and the lifestyle guidance counselor at U.A. whose Quirk Dog (犬, Inu) gives him the appearance of a dog. When he is angry, Hound Dog speaks in an incoherent and violent manner with a mix of words and a sound akin to a dog's growling. During the opening ceremony, he has some final comments to say. Unfortunately, his anger causes his speech to come out as a mix of words and incoherent growls, ending with a howl which scares a few of the students.^{[ch. 122, 183]}

=== Faculty of Ketsubutsu Academy High School ===
Emi Fukukado (福門 笑, Fukukado Emi) / Ms. Joke (ミスジョーク, Misu Jōku)
Voiced by: Mariko Nagai (Japanese); Amber Lee Connors (English)

Emi Fukukado is a Pro Hero and the teacher of Second Year, Class 2 at Ketsubetsu Academy High School. Her Quirk Outburst (勃発/激発/爆笑/爆発/バースト, Boppatsu/Gekihatsu/Bakushō/Bakuhatsu/Basuto) forces her targets to burst into uncontrollable laughter that dulls their motor skills and impairs their cognitive abilities.^{[ch. 103, p. 4–5]} Ms. Joke's general aesthetic was inspired by the DC Comics supervillain Joker. Her theme is clearer when she is around Shota Aizawa. Unlike the original Batman and Joker, who have clashing personalities and worldviews, she and Shota get along well and understand one another. Ms. Joke is known for her cheerful and outgoing personality. She always has a goofy and somewhat obnoxious sense of humor on full display and jumps at the chance to make others laugh. She has no shame in flirting with Shota, endlessly trying to break his cold exterior to get him to smile. Though her behavior appears to be unprofessional, Ms. Joke takes her job as a teacher and Pro Hero very seriously, and clearly has a thorough understanding of heroics, as demonstrated by her commentary throughout the license exam. After the exam concludes with a substantial portion of both Ms. Joke's and Shota's classes passing, she suggests that they carry out joint training in the future and Shota agrees.^{[ch. 114]}

=== Oki Mariner Crew ===
The Oki Mariner Crew (隠岐マリナークルー, Oki marinākurū) is a Hero group that specializes in marine-based missions. Froppy once interned with this group.^{[ch. 58]}

Selkie (セルキー, Serukī)
Voiced by: Tomokazu Seki (Japanese); Ray Hurd (English)

Sea Rescue Hero Selkie is a sea captain of the Oki Mariner Crew. His Quirk Spotted Seal (ゴマフアザラシ, Gomafuazarashi) gives him the appearance and the abilities of a spotted seal.

Sirius (シリウス, Shiriusu)
Voiced by: Ami Koshimizu (Japanese); Emily Neves (English)

Sirius is a member of the Oki Mariner Crew, and the sidekick of Selkie, who wears earpieces that are in the shape of fish fins. Her Quirk Good Ear (グッドイヤー, Guddo Iyā) allows her to hear high frequencies that a normal person cannot.

=== The Wild Wild Pussycats ===
The Wild Wild Pussycats (ワイルドワイルドプッシーキャッツ, Wairudo Wairudo Pusshīkyattsu) are a group of four cat-themed Heroes. This hero group specialize in mountain rescue operations and are veterans in their respective fields. They even own a large forested mountain. They have twelve years of rescuing experience. They were enlisted by U.A. during the Forest Training Arc to help train the students.^{[ch. 70]} Among its members are:

Shino Sosaki (送崎 信乃, Sōsaki Shino) / Mandalay (マンダレイ, Mandarei)
Voiced by: Meiko Kawasaki (Japanese); Jill Harris (English)

Shino Sosaki is the leader of the Pussycats, whose Quirk Telepath (テレパス, Terepasu) allows her to advise and instruct multiple people at once through mental telepathy.^{[ch. 72, p. 5]} She also has an ability in sending messages to people one at a time. Although she can send messages, her drawbacks is that she cannot receive them.^{[ch. 74, p. 3]} Her personality contrasts with that of her partner, Pixie-Bob. While Pixie-Bob is often loud and energetic, Mandalay remains calm and gentle. Even so, she remains just as eccentric and demanding as the rest of her teammates. She often shows great concern for others including her nephew Kota, as well as the students from U.A. High. Despite being genuinely caring, Mandalay is not above poking fun at others' expense. She had no problem teasing Class 1-A about how much longer it would take them to cross Beast's Forest than the Pussycats. She extended this to her nephew by pointing out his shoes being like Izuku's.^{[ep 87]}

Ryuko Tsuchikawa (土川 流子, Tsuchikawa Ryūko) / Pixie-Bob (ピクシーボブ, Pikushī Bobu)
Voiced by: Serina Machiyama (Japanese); Cherami Leigh (English)

Ryuko Tsuchikawa is a member of the Pussycats whose Quirk Earth Flow (土流/アースフロー, Doryū/Āsufurō) allows her to freely manipulate the ground.^{[ep 41]} Described as hyperactive and a loud person, Pixie-Bob is very self-conscious about her age and punished Izuku Midoriya when he nearly brought it up, saying that she is still eighteen at heart. Mandalay stated that Pixie-Bob is in a rush to find love and that her impatience has only grown worse over the years. Pixie-Bob seems to have a fondness for young promising heroes such as Izuku, Tenya Ida, Shoto Todoroki, and Katsuki Bakugo, and is unafraid to show it.^{[ch. 70]} During the Vanguard Action Squad Invasion, she was attacked by Magne and Spinner, and knocked unconscious by Magne's iron rod.^{[ch. 73]} Following the incident, Pixie-Bob was taken to the hospital to have her wound treated.^{[ch. 96]}

Tomoko Shiretoko (知床 知子, Shiretoko Tomoko) / Ragdoll (ラグドール, Ragudōru)
Voiced by: Chisa Suganuma (Japanese); Tia Ballard (English)

Tomoko Shiretoko is a member of the Pussycats whose former Quirk Search (捜す/探す/捜索/検索/サーチ, Sagasu/Sagasu/Sōsaku/Kensaku/Sāchi) allows her to observe and monitor up to 100 people at a time.^{[ep 41]} Even among the overzealous and eccentric Pussycats, Ragdoll stands out as the most hyperactive among them. She is very energetic and can be identified by her body language, such as constantly blinking or being unable to keep still. She was kidnapped by the League of Villains during the Vanguard Action Squad Invasion,^{[ch. 86]} but she was later rescued by Tiger when the Pro Heroes began to infiltrate the villains' hideout.^{[ch. 87]} Even after her Quirk was stolen by All For One offscreen so that he can find Tomura, Ragdoll remains a part of the team and is now taking care of the office duties. All For One has offered to return the Quirk to Ragdoll while incarcerated.

Yawara Chatora (茶虎 柔, Chatora Yawara) / Tiger (虎, Tora)
Voiced by: Shinosuke Ogami (Japanese); Marcus D. Stimac (English)

Yawara Chatora is the only male member of the Pussycats. His Quirk Pliabody (軟体/プリアボディ, Nantai/Puriabodi) allows him to stretch and bend his body. Tiger is a transgender man. Born female, he transitioned in Thailand a long time ago, bringing his external appearance and social presentation in line with his male identity.^{[vol. 9, omake]} He is a very macho, strict, and intimidating man who always seems to have a fear-inducing aura. At the same time, he maintains the same level of goofy eccentricity as his teammates. He is unafraid to push his students, even inviting them to tear their muscles so they can grow back stronger. He does not tolerate any slacking off, and is willing to physically punish students who are not "Plus Ultra".^{[ch. 72, p. 4–8]} Tiger also has a caring side, being very adamant about protecting both his students and teammates. He became enraged at the sight of Pixie-Bob's being assaulted at the hands of Magne.^{[ep 42]}

=== The Lurkers ===
The Lurkers (潜伏者/ラーカーズ, Senpuku-sha/Rākāzu) are a group of Heroes. Although the team consists of only three heroes, it can be considered as quite powerful since they are highly ranked on the Japanese Hero Billboard Chart. This implies that the team is strong and versatile. Among its members are:

Shinya Kamihara (紙原 伸也, Kamihara Shinya) / Edgeshot (エッジショット, Ejjishotto)
Voiced by: Kenta Kamakari (Japanese); John Burgmeier (English)

Shinya Kamihara is a Pro Hero, and the leader of The Lurkers, whose Quirk Foldabody (紙肢/フォルダボディ, Shishi/Forudabodi) enables him to manipulate the thinness of his body. He can use his Quirk to move around quickly, slip through tight spaces, and pierce targets by folding himself into sharp shapes.^{[ch. 88]} Befitting the nature of a shinobi, Edgeshot is calm and focused. He is able to maintain a levelhead even in crisis situations and consoles his teammates when they begin to panic. He is quite intelligent and good at analyzing situations and formulating strategies. He was able to discern the nature of All For One's warping Quirk after only seeing it in action once. Edgeshot is quick to take the initiative in preventing conflict, and is brave enough to take action in the worst of circumstances. To assist All Might, Edgeshot along with Endeavor, even took on the likes of All For One.^{[ep 49]} He is also a recurring character in the My Hero Academia: Vigilantes manga spin-off, where he gets invited by Makoto Tsukauchi to participate in the farewell show dedicated to Captain Celebrity at the Tokyo Sky Egg on the occasion of his return to the United States.^{[VGLS ch. 47]}

Shinji Nishiya (西屋 森児, Nishiya Shinji) / Kamui Woods (シンリンカムイ, Shinrin Kamui)
Voiced by: Masamichi Kitada (Japanese); Aaron Roberts (English)

Shinji Nishiya is a Pro Hero and member of The Lurkers whose Quirk Arbor (東屋/樹木/めずまや, Azumaya/Jumoku/Mezu Maya) gives him the ability to manipulate his tree-like limbs. Kamui Woods had a very dark childhood and it is said that his childhood was portrayed in a popular documentary.^{[vol. 10, omake]} Shinji is a very serious and focused person when it comes to his hero duties; however, he easily feels depressed when someone else takes credit for something he did. At the same time, he also appears to be rather emotional, such as when he was invited by Edgeshot to be part of The Lurkers, he cried in happiness for two hours.^{[GB p. 175]}

Yu Takeyama (岳山 優, Takeyama Yū) / Mt. Lady (Mt.レディ, Maunto Redi)
Voiced by: Kaori Nazuka (Japanese); Jamie Marchi (English)

Yu Takeyama is a Pro Hero, and the only female member of The Lurkers, whose Quirk Gigantification (巨大化, Kyodai-ka) allows her to grow to a gigantic height. Mt. Lady was originally conceived by Horikoshi to be the female lead, but was replaced by Ochaco due to his not knowing how to utilize her Quirk in the story. Her original design was created from Ochaco's prototype concept, and also would end up being given to Class 1-B's student Yui Kodai. In the 10th manga volume, she starts her own Hero Agency at a young age, and despite her high number of successes, she causes unintentional destruction to the city by her Quirk. While she works hard to earn money for reparations, she ends up causing destruction again and this cycle repeats itself. Her hard work is also what brought her to the Hideout Raid Team.^{[vol. 10]} During Minoru Mineta's internship, she appears to be very lazy because she forces him to work instead of teaching him.^{[ep 17]} Furthermore, she also has a lecherous side, as seen when she takes interest in Shoto Todoroki.^{[ch. 241]} She relishes the media attention that comes with her heroic deeds, although she is willing to take her work seriously when needed.

=== Nighteye Agency ===
Mirai Sasaki (佐々木 未来, Sasaki Mirai) / Sir Nighteye (サーナイトアイ, Sā Naitoai)
Voiced by: Shin-ichiro Miki (Japanese); Brandon McInnis (English)

Mirai Sasaki is a Pro Hero, and former sidekick to All Might, whose Quirk Foresight (予見/先見/先見の明/予知, Yoken/Senken/Senken no Mei/Yochi) allows him to see a person's future. He was designed after the stereotypical look of a Japanese salaryman, contrasting with All Might's American looks.^{[vol. 14]} At first, Nighteye showed that he disapproved of All Might choosing Izuku Midoriya, who was previously Quirkless, to be his successor and inherit One For All. He protested against this strongly, saying that there would be any number of people more suitable, and declared that Izuku could not become the successor on good intentions and willpower alone. However, he hired Izuku into his agency after learning that he did not damage any of Sir Nighteye's merchandise of All Might.^{[ch. 127]} He was shown to be caring for All Might and expressed grave concern when he would continue with his hero duties after receiving horrific injuries in his first battle with All For One. He pleaded with All Might to retire and focus on finding a successor, foreseeing that he would meet a horrible death should he continue serving as the Symbol of Peace.^{[ep 67]} Nighteye is fatally wounded by Overhaul during the Shie Hassaikai raid, and later dies in the hospital in All Might's company.

Juzo Moashi (百足 従造, Moashi Jūzō) / Centipeder (センチピーダー, Senchipīdā)
Voiced by: Kenta Ōkuma (Japanese); Zach Bolton (English)

Juzo Moashi is a centipede–headed Nighteye Agency member. His Quirk Centipede (蜈蚣/蚰蜒/百足/ムカデ, Mukade/Yóu Yán/Mukade/Mukade) grants him long, centipede-like limbs filled with agonizing poison. He is a gentleman and a very well-mannered person. Following Sir Nighteye's death, Centipeder takes over the Nighteye Agency.^{[ch. 135]}

Kaoruko Awata (泡田 薫子, Awata Kaoruko) / Bubble Girl (バブルガール, Baburu Gāru)
Voiced by: Rie Murakawa (Japanese); Kara Edwards (English)

Kaoruko Awata is one of Sir Nighteye's assistants, whose Quirk Bubble (沸かす/泡立つ/泡沫/泡/バブル, Wakasu/Awadatsu/Utakata/Awa/Baburu) allows her to make bubbles filled with an aroma that she has smelled at least once before. Bubble Girl is shown to be a fairly serious and dedicated hero. She appears to be calm, even when she feels worried about Sir Nighteye, who would fire her, which happens quite frequently.^{[ch. 126]} She remains at the Nighteye Agency following Sir Nighteye's death.^{[ch. 135]}

=== Foreign Heroes ===
Cathleen Bate (キャスリーン・ベイト, Kyasurīn Beito) / Star and Stripe (スターアンドストライプ, Sutā Ando Sutoraipu)
Voiced by: Romi Park (Japanese); Natalie Van Sistine (English)

Cathleen Bate is the top hero from the United States. She was saved by All Might in her childhood and, inspired by him, became a Hero. Her Quirk New Order (新体制/新しい秩序/ニューオーダー, Shintaisei/Atarashī Chūmon/Nyūōdā) allows her to alter the nature of objects and beings in contact with her. Her hero name was based on a nickname for the flag of the United States ("Stars and Stripes"), after which her costume was designed. Horikoshi describes her as "cool, cute, and strong". She was killed during an attempt to defeat Tomura. However, before she died, she used New Order's ability to destroy All for One's many Quirks, while also severely injuring Tomura.^{[ch. 333]}

Clair Voyance (クレア ボヤンス, Kurea Boyansu)
Voiced by: Yōko Honna (Japanese); Sarah Roach (English)

Claire Voyance is a pro hero from Otheon introduced in My Hero Academia: World Heroes' Mission. Her Quirk Voyance (透視/ヴォヤンス, Tōshi/Voyansu) allows her to see through anything. Claire has a calm, resolved, and relatively serious composure. She is a dutiful hero who assists others when needed, such as during the raid on Humarise Headquarters.

Salaam (サラーム, Sarāmu)
Voiced by: Takuma Miyazono (Japanese); Frank Todaro (English)

Salaam is the top hero from Egypt, introduced in My Hero Academia: World Heroes' Mission. His Quirk Papyrus (パピルス, Papirusu) allows him to make his body paper-thin. He was described as the one who spends his time protecting Egypt and "has a strange aura that makes the citizens feel at ease" when he fights. It is said that no one has ever seen his back to this day, and his Quirk makes him flexible, which is similar to Edgeshot. He is later introduced into the manga, where he and Big Red Dot express frustration at being kept from assisting Japan against All For One.

Big Red Dot (ビッグ・レッド・ドット, Biggu Reddo Dotto)

Big Red Dot is the top hero from Singapore, introduced in My Hero Academia: World Heroes' Mission. His Quirk Tidal Bore (潮汐/大海嘯, Chōseki/Daikaishō) allows him to fire powerful blasts of water from his mouth. His appearance and Quirk is based on the Merlion folk creature. He is later introduced into the manga, where he and Salaam expressed frustration at being kept from assisting Japan against All For One.

Christopher Skyline (クリストファー・スカイライン, Kurisutofā Sukairain) / Captain Celebrity (キャプテン・セレブリティ, Kyaputen Sereburiti)
Voiced by: Toshiyuki Morikawa (Japanese); Sean Schemmel (English)

Christopher Skyline is a pro hero from the United States with the Quirk Flight (飛翔/便/飛行/フライト, Hishō/Ben/Hikō/Furaito), and who appears in My Hero Academia: Vigilantes^{[VGLS ch. 14]} as a recurring character who is forced to relocate to Japan due to his arrogant playboy ways causing problems with his marriage and numerous lawsuits filed against him. Despite his initial arrogance he becomes good friends with Vigilante the Crawler and manages to improve himself over time, eventually allowing him to return home. In the finale, he gets the Crawler out of legal trouble by claiming him as his sidekick,^{[VGLS ch. 124, p. 5–6]} effectively recruiting him into his company.^{[VGLS ch. 125, p. 16–19]}

=== Other Heroes ===
Death Arms (デスアームズ, Desutegoro)
Voiced by: Shinnosuke Ogami (Japanese); Cris George (English)

Death Arms (デスアームズ, Desuāmuzu) is a very tall man who wields an unknown Quirk that gives his arms super-strength. He once criticized Izuku for his attempts to rescue Bakugo and was responsible for exposing Slidin' Go's connection with the Paranormal Liberation Front. Due to the many criticisms levied at him during the Dark Hero Arc, Death Arms briefly retired from the Pro Hero business.^{[ch. 317]} However, he came out of retirement and resumed his work after the Final War.^{[ch. 431]}

Taishiro Toyomitsu (豊満 太志郎, Toyomitsu Taishirō) / Fat Gum (ファットガム, Fatto Gamu)
Voiced by: Kazuyuki Okitsu (Japanese); Kyle Hebert (English)

Taishiro Toyomitsu is a Pro Hero who employs Tamaki Amajiki and Eijiro Kirishima as interns. His Quirk Fat Absorption (脂肪吸着/の吸収, Shibō Kyūchaku/no kyūshū) allows him to use his fat to absorb impact from collisions, although the more impacts his fat absorbs, the thinner he gets. Fat Gum appears to be constantly hungry, which leads him to eat a lot. He is friendly towards civilians and other heroes, appearing to be a playful and carefree person. However, he gets extremely serious when the situation demands it, always having the work ethic of a hero.^{[ch. 132–133]} He is also a recurring character in the Vigilantes manga spin-off, where he witnesses All Might defeating the villains.^{[VGLS ch. 93–94]} Fat Gum is a kind man and will prioritize helping people and saving lives. He cares deeply about the well-being of others, especially those in his care, which is why he becomes so angry when villains threaten the lives of others. He was very worried about Eijiro's state after the fight with Eight Precepts of Death and cried tears of relief when he realized Eijiro was fine.^{[ch. 146]}

Ken Takagi (高木 鍵, Takagi Ken) / Rock Lock (ロックロック, Rokku Rokku)
Voiced by: Yasuhiro (Japanese); Gabe Kunda (English)

Takagi Ken is a Pro Hero whose Quirk Lock Down (施錠/ロックダウン, Sejō/Rokku Daun) enables him to lock any non-living item in position. Takagi is a decisive and blunt man who is quick to judge whether or not someone is an asset. His confidence sometimes borders on arrogance, as when he tells Sir Nighteye to use his foresight on him to prove it is fallible, believing himself entirely capable of escaping whatever fate Sir Nighteye sees.^{[ch. 136]} He is often annoyed by inexperience in people, though this may be due to the stakes of their mission against Overhaul. However, his critical attitude is not malicious as he is glad that Tamaki Amajiki does not get injured. Though he makes quick judgement of others and strongly doubts the capabilities of the students, his first impressions are not set in stone, as he is very impressed and proud when the students exceed his expectations and goes so far as to say they are better heroes than the adult ones.^{[ch. 153]}

Masaki Mizushima (水島 正樹, Mizushima Masaki) / Manual (マニュアル, Manyuaru)
Voiced by: Kenta Ōkuma (Japanese); Ethan Gallardo (English)

Masaki Mizushima is a Pro Hero whose unnamed Quirk allows him to control water. Despite Manual being a side character, Horikoshi stated that he likes drawing him.^{[vol. 6]} Manual is very kind and attentive. He has an inspiring attitude, as he wants to become a role model for all modern heroes and can complete any task simply. It was revealed that he chose Tenya Ida because he feels similar to Tenya.^{[vol. 6, p. 126]} He tells Tenya that he is very excited to be mentoring Ingenium's younger brother, and is confused as to why Tenya would not have chosen a more famous hero to intern with.^{[ch. 47]} He also has a keen mind and could figure out the reason that Tenya chose his office was to find the Hero Killer: Stain.^{[ch. 50]}

Sorahiko Torino (酉野 空彦, Torino Sorahiko) / Gran Torino (グラントリノ, Guran Torino)
Voiced by: Kenichi Ogata, Masamichi Kitada (young) (Japanese); Charles Campbell (English)

Sorahiko Torino is a retired hero, and a former mentor of All Might and Izuku Midoriya, whose Quirk Jet (噴射/ジェット, Funsha/Jetto) allows him to shoot air from the soles of his feet. Elements of Sorahiko's character are based on Yoda. Initially, Gran Torino appeared to be a senile old man who forgot Izuku Midoriya's name, often calling him "Toshinori", even though it was he who sent Izuku the internship offer. In reality, this proved to be nothing more than a façade for messing with his newfound protégé.^{[ch. 46]} As a mentor, Gran Torino appears to be very hard on his students. Every time All Might speaks about, or to, Gran Torino, he becomes agitated, and shakes profusely, because of his memories of their brutal training.^{[ep 26]}^{[ep 31]} Nevertheless, he does not hesitate to praise his students when they deserve it, such as when he complimented Izuku for his increased skill with his power, and when he complimented All Might's victory over All For One.^{[ch. 49, 95]} Since the Hideout Raid Arc, he continued assisting the Police Force in investigating the League of Villains, and later the Paranormal Liberation Front.^{[ch. 259]} After the Paranormal Liberation War, he is inactive in hero work due to his injuries.^{[ch. 298]}

Tensei Ida (飯田 天晴, Īda Tensei) / Ingenium (インゲニウム, Ingeniumu)
Voiced by: Masamichi Kitada (Japanese); Phil Parsons (English)

Tensei Ida is Tenya's older brother, and a former Pro Hero, whose Quirk Engine (エンジン発動機/機関/エンジン, Enjin Hatsudō-ki/Kikan/Enjin) allows him to release propulsion jets from his elbows and shoot himself forward at great speed. Compared to his younger brother, Tensei has a more an easy-going attitude. When he took up the hero mantle of his family, his image for himself was that he wanted to 'be cool' and be the type of hero that helps others. He was joyful that his younger brother admired his work as a pro hero as a result. Unfortunately, he resigned after being badly injured by Stain and asks Tenya to take up his hero name.^{[ep 26]} Tensei is shown to be proud of Tenya's heroic intentions. He congratulated his brother for obtaining the Provisional Hero License and considering that he was already prepared, he told him the familiar method of how to improve his Quirk and make Recipro more powerful, faster, and last longer than before.^{[ch. 203]}

Moe Kamiji (上路 萌, Kamiji Moe) / Burnin (バーニン, Bānin)
Voiced by: Misato Kawauchi (Japanese); Lisa Ortiz (English)

Moe Kamiji is a Pro Hero and one of over thirty sidekicks who work at the Endeavor Agency. Her Quirk Blazing Hair (燃髪/ブレイジングヘア, Nenpatsu/Bureijinguhea) allows her to weaponize her fire-like hair. As her hero name suggests, Moe possesses a burning hot personality, which tends to clash with that of Katsuki Bakugo. In the 25th volume of the manga, she is shown to be in love with festivals.^{[vol. 25, omake]}

Gunhead (ガンヘッド, Ganheddo)
Voiced by: Koji Okino (Japanese); Brandon Potter (English)

Battle Hero: Gunhead specializes in hand-to-hand combat, he fights using his own close combat martial arts, Gunhead Martial Arts (GMA). He is muscular, has a protector as a face, and appears rough, but his tone is calm. His Quirk is Gatling. His arms have several organs that work similarly to muzzles, and he can fire collagen masses that harden similar to teeth and nails in a similar manner to bullets. He mainly uses warning shots, but he uses martial arts in decisive blows. He trained Ochaco Uraraka to use Gunhead Martial Arts.^{[ch. 48]}^{[ep 26]}

== Villains ==
Zen Shigaraki (死柄木 全, Shigaraki Zen) / All For One (オール・フォー・ワン, Ōru Fō Wan)
Voiced by: Akio Otsuka, Hiroshi Kamiya (young) (Japanese); John Swasey, Ryan Negrón (young) (English)

The overarching antagonist of the series, the arch-enemy of All Might and numerous other characters, and once the world's most powerful supervillain, also known as the Symbol of Evil (悪の象徴, Aku no Shōchō). His Quirk All For One (オール・フォー・ワン, Ōru Fō Wan) enables him to both steal and bestow Quirks, as well as wield multiple Quirks at once. A being of pure genius, sadism and egomania mixed with charisma, All for One seeks to slaughter the majority of humanity and subjugate the survivors he deems worthy of his orders, with the ultimate intention of ruling over what's left as a self-described "Demon Lord". To this end, he has enacted numerous plans with lasting consequences over the past century, ruling each of them from the shadows. His actions are responsible for the majority of villainous ideology across the series, including the founding of the League of Villains, the proliferation of the Quirk Doomsday Theory, and the rise to prominence of the Meta Liberation Army. His primary objective towards his goal is stealing One For All, both because it is the only Quirk that can successfully defy him and also as an attempt to further look down on his brother. The character was inspired by the Star Wars antagonist Darth Vader and the X-Men villain Cassandra Nova. In the past, he looked after his younger brother Yoichi, although he was condescending towards him. He mocked his frail brother for harboring ideals of justice.^{[ep 90]} He has a firm contempt for ideals of morality and justice, dismissing them as beliefs that shackle personal freedom.^{[ch. 237]} All For One is a patient mentor of his protégé, Tomura. He gives constructive criticism and encouragement to his successor. He also prefers to teach Tomura by giving him varied experiences that he can learn from. However, this apparent benevolence is a façade, because All For One views Tomura merely as a valuable tool with which to steal One For All. Although he is initially defeated by All Might and imprisoned in Tartarus for his crimes, it is revealed that All For One arranged for his original Quirk to be transplanted into Tomura. All For One eventually escapes when Tomura and Garaki's surviving Nomus launch an assault on the prison and free all of its inmates.^{[ch. 273]} Acquiring a drug that Kyudai reverse-engineered from Overhaul's Quirk-Destroying Drug to function like Eri's Quirk and warned that it would eventually revert him into nothingness, All For One uses it on himself during the final battle to fight at his prime while adamant that his visage within Tomura would see him through to the end.^{[ch. 365]} But All For One senses his visage destroyed by Tomura and makes his way towards his ward to regain control of him.^{[ch. 379]} During the final battle, All For One becomes emotionally unstable due to the side effects of the drug, which made him lose control of his Quirk factors, and eventually is defeated by Katsuki Bakugo. With the drug accelerating the rejuvenation process after taking fatal injuries, All For One is turned into an infant before vanishing for good.^{[ch.. 410]} He later returns as a vestige and takes over Tomura's body when his resolvé falters as a final ditch effort to survive, revealing in the process that he engineered every step of Tomura's road to villainy from before his birth, up to and including influencing his father's negative opinion on heroes, but is annihilated for the final time with the combined efforts of Izuku, Tomura, One For All vestiges, and all the remaining heroes from both inside and outside.

=== League of Villains ===
The League of Villains (敵(ヴィラン)連合, Viran Rengō) is an organization, originally established and led by All For One, that intends to destroy hero society and return villains to prominence as they were before the rise of All Might.

After the League wins their war with the Meta Liberation Army, Tomura merges both organizations to form the Paranormal Liberation Front.^{[ch. 240]}

Tenko Shimura (志村 転弧, Shimura Tenko) / Tomura Shigaraki (死柄木 弔, Shigaraki Tomura)
Voiced by: Koki Uchiyama, Arisa Sekine (young) (Japanese); Eric Vale, Emily Fajardo (young) (English)

The main antagonist of the series, All For One's apprentice, and Izuku's archnemesis. Born the grandson of All Might's master Nana Shimura, as a child he was rescued from the streets by All For One after he accidentally slaughtered his entire family with his Quirk, Decay (崩壊, Hōkai), which enables him to disintegrate whatever he touches with his fingers and anything connected to it. The character is based on the protagonist of the author's first one-shot titled Tenko, which starred the eponymous boy during wartime in feudal Japan. While Horikoshi was drawing his character, he discovered that drawing inexpressive hands was extremely difficult. He stated that he was on the verge of tears every week due to having to draw a particular character which is assumed to be Tomura.^{[vol. 2, omake]} Tomura made the villains known to the heroes by leading the attack on the Unforeseen Simulation Joint.^{[ch. 13]} He has a twisted, malevolent, and malicious personality, which is the polar opposite of Izuku Midoriya's. He does not care for his own or almost anyone else's life, having no qualms about performing evil deeds such as murdering innocent people.^{[ch. 17, 68]} Much like a child, he seems unable to cope with his own feelings, instead lashing out and abusing himself and others, tearing at his own neck when he becomes frustrated or stressed. This particular agony stems from the abuse he suffered from his hero-hating father and being alone during his childhood, with All For One claiming that it represented his suppressed urge to kill and destroy.^{[ep 111]} During his fight with Re-Destro, he overcame the past shackles of guilt, through his childhood feelings and his memories of being alone, and now looks forward to end the hero society.^{[ep 112]} After All For One is arrested, Tomura takes full control of the League and eventually becomes the Grand Commander of the Paranormal Liberation Front, a combined villain army that consists of the League and the Meta Liberation Army.^{[ch. 240]} Eventually, Tomura inherits All For One's Quirk as part of the villain's scheme to acquire One For All, with All For One's visage gradually absorbing and reflecting Tomura's consciousness.^{[ch. 273, 336]} During the final battle, Tomura finally destroys All For One's visage and regains control of his body with the intention of destroying everything.^{[ch. 379]} Before dying he concedes defeat to Deku and encourages him to improve society, his heart finally saved.

Oboro Shirakumo (白雲 朧, Shirakumo Oboro) / Loud Cloud (ラウドクラウド, Raudo Kuraudo) / Kurogiri (黒霧; lit. 'Black Fog')
Voiced by: Takahiro Fujiwara (Kurogiri), Kensho Ono (Oboro Shirakumo/Loud Cloud) (Japanese); Chuck Huber (Kurogiri), Stephen Sanders (Oboro Shirakumo/Loud Cloud) (English)

Tomura's caretaker and the League's second-in-command. His Quirk Warp Gate (ワープゲート, Wāpu Gēto) allows him to generate a dark purple fog from his body and use it to create weaponized long-ranged portals. Kurogiri is levelheaded, which often serves to ground Tomura's immaturity. He is intensely loyal to both All For One and Tomura, having been created to watch over the latter. As a Nomu, he is programmed to only obey commands from a select few and remain silent in the face of any attempt to extract compromising information about the League from him. Kurogiri is very polite and well-spoken, even to his enemies, sometimes introducing himself in a formal manner. However, just like his fellow villains of the League, he possesses a truly sinister nature, having no qualms in putting hero students in situations where they would be tortured or killed. Kurogiri assisted Tomura in leading a number of underlings in the attack on the Unforeseen Simulation Joint.^{[ch. 13]} After he is captured by Gran Torino and imprisoned in Tartarus, he is revealed to be a Nomu created from the corpse of Oboro Shirakumo, Eraserhead and Present Mic's high school classmate and close friend with an unnamed Cloud Quirk who died years ago in a villain attack. At the time when Kurogiri was among the Nomu held at Central Hospital, Neito Monoma was able to use his Copy Quirk to copy Warp Gate to surprise the villains and divide them up. Spinner, some Paranormal Liberation Front members, and the Paranormal Liberation Front supporters raided the hospital. Despite resistance from Present Mic, Spinner was successful in awakening Kurogiri through a special device that All For One placed on him.^{[ch. 344, 372–373]} During the "Final War" arc, Kurogiri was killed by Bakugo following Tomura's death.^{[ch. 423]}

Dr. Kyudai Garaki (殻木 球大 博士, Garaki Kyūdai Hakase) / Daruma Ujiko (氏子 達磨, Ujiko Daruma) / Doctor (ドクター, Dokutā)
Voiced by: Minoru Inaba (Japanese); Mark Stoddard (English)

All For One's personal doctor and a genius mad scientist. His Quirk Life Force (摂生/ライフフォース, Sessei/Raifufōsu) grants him an extended lifespan and makes him look younger than he actually is. Because of his Quirk, Kyudai is one of the oldest characters in the series, having been alive since the beginning of Quirks, although it is unclear whether he is older than All For One. He is also responsible for creating the Nomu. Kyudai dutifully follows All For One's will. Similar to Gigantomachia, he did not believe that Tomura was yet worthy of succeeding All For One. Due to a compromise he made with his former master, he was willing to give Tomura the chance to prove him wrong.^{[ch. 222]} While under the alias of Dr. Tsubasa at one of his clinics, he pointed out to Izuku's mother Inko Midoriya that Izuku should give up aspiring to be a hero due to being diagnosed as Quirkless.^{[ep 1]} During the Jaku Hospital Raid, Kyudai was apprehended. Police Force member Gori was outside his cell when Kyudai talked about the day when All For One first met Dabi.^{[ch. 350]} The character's name was previously Maruta Shiga (志賀 丸太, Shiga Maruta), but was changed following the backlash in relation to the war crimes committed by Unit 731 during the Second World War.

Kagero Okuta (憶田 影朧, Okuta Kagerō) / Giran (義爛)
Voiced by: Seirou Ogino (Japanese); Ben Phillips (English)

A bespectacled villain who works as a broker for the League of Villains. His Quirk Muddiness (芥/濁り/混濁, Akuta/Nigori/Kondaku) allows him to cause a person to suffer mild amnesia by making physical contact with their head. Giran appears to be indifferent and unsympathetic towards others, focused only on getting money from his clients. Despite being only interested in profitability, Giran does have standards. He refuses to have dealings with anyone he hates, and no amount of money or threats will change his mind.^{[ch. 219]} He also has an affable and even kind side towards some of his clients, most notably Jin Bubaigawara, who had been left alone and mentally scarred after an incident involving his Quirk. Seeing that Jin was at such a low point, Giran encouraged him to join a group who could use his talents, saying that outcasts like him are more common than he thinks.^{[ch. 229]} During the "Paranormal Liberation" Arc, Giran was seen in a bunker.^{[ch. 266]}

Toya Todoroki (轟 燈矢, Todoroki Tōya) / Dabi (荼毘)
Voiced by: Hiro Shimono, Ryoko Shiraishi (young) (Japanese); Jason Liebrecht, Sara Ragsdale (young) (English)

The archnemesis of Shoto Todoroki, a disdainful and sociopathic villain whose Quirk Blueflame (蒼炎, Sōen) allows him to generate and control a stronger variant of Endeavor's "Hellflame", possessing a high cold resistance but unable to withstand his own flames for a prolonged amount of time, which explains the burns and staples on parts of his body. Dabi is a stoic, calculative, aloof, confident, and focused individual who rarely shows emotion. While rather crude and violent, he is cautious, choosing to retreat when Mirko arrives to aid Endeavor and make sure not to divulge too much information to Hawks about High-End because of the infancy of their relationship.^{[ch. 191]} Despite his usual expressionless behavior, Dabi finds joy in establishing himself as a villain fighting what he believes to be false heroes, an ideology proposed by his apparent inspiration, Stain. He is dedicated to Stain's mission and desires to destroy superhuman society, sharing Stain's belief that one person with the necessary conviction can do so.^{[ch. 72]} He is later revealed to be Toya Todoroki, Endeavor's eldest son, who was thought to have died years ago in a training accident and was driven to villainy after his father ultimately deems him useless for lacking the right Quirk to surpass All Might.^{[ep 124]} Initially energetic and boisterous as a child with a desire to learn from his father, Toya went through an existential crisis when he was replaced by his younger brother Shoto, which led to him despising both his younger brother and his father. While Dabi intended to kill Shoto in revenge, he takes advantage of Endeavor becoming Japan's new Number One Hero to expose their family life to the nation. During Class 1-A's battle with the Paranormal Liberation Front^{[ch. 298]} and during the Final War Arc^{[ch. 345–352]} Shoto faces his brother, seeing himself in him due their pasts with their father. In the Final War Arc, Dabi is defeated after a fierce battle, but his Quirk evolved during the fight as he replicates Shoto's Phosphor to avoid being frozen, making his way to Endeavor when Skeptic relays that his father is fighting All For One.^{[ch. 363]} Dabi is revealed to have been building up his body heat during the conflict with the intent of turning himself into a bomb to kill everyone, but the Todoroki family prevents his detonation with a near-dead Dabi cursing Endeavor.^{[ch. 388–390]} He is placed on life support with Endeavor pledging to make amends and shoulder the burden of his hatred by promising to visit Dabi daily.^{[ch. 424]}

Himiko Toga (渡我 被身子, Toga Himiko)
Voiced by: Misato Fukuen (Japanese); Leah Clark (English)

The archnemesis of Ochaco Uraraka, a demented yandere-type girl who is able to assume the physical appearance of another with her Quirk Transform (化する/変ずる/変じる/変身, Kasuru/Henzuru/Henjiru/Henshin), which involves her drinking a person's blood in order to turn into that person, this ability later evolving to allow her to use the Quirk of whomever she turns into, provided that she has access to information about that quirk. Horikoshi stated that Toga is the hardest female character to illustrate so far, her eyes and hair being particularly difficult. She is a cheerful girl, to the point of smiling even after having presumably killed someone, displaying sadistic tendencies.^{[ch. 57]} But she has shown to be easily embarrassed, such as when she thinks people are flirting with her,^{[ch. 91]} or when she is naked while copying the clothes of the people that she has transformed into.^{[ch. 149]} Toga was driven to villainy when her parents spurned her for her morbid blood obsession, she eventually ran away from home after attacking a bleeding student she liked in a moment of weakness.^{[ep 109]} She is considered to be an arch-enemy of Ochaco Uraraka, although she also fought Tsuyu Asui, thus causing Tsuyu to feel hatred towards Toga. Despite her attempt to kill both girls, she tries to befriend them as they fight, affectionately calling Tsuyu by her first name and describing the former as "lovely". When talking to Ochaco, she said that it is only natural to want to be like the one you love, and for Toga this means physically becoming whoever it is that she has romantic feelings towards. This warped idea of how romance works, is due to her psychotic nature and obsession with blood. Her obsession with blood plays into her warped perception of how romantic relationships work.^{[ch. 80]} During the Provisional Hero License Exam, she disguised herself as Camie while fighting Izuku. She also transforms into Ochaco and tries to tag Izuku, but he sees through her disguise. He saves her despite knowing she was not the real Ochaco. Toga then transforms back into Camie once she finds that Izuku saw through her disguise. She leaves the area afterwards, which later makes Hanta, Denki and Minoru feel suspicious about Izuku having a naked encounter with "Camie".^{[ep 54]}^{[ep 57]} Toga's obsession with Deku and Ochaco also motivates her desire to be accepted by society, deciding to kill Ochaco in response to both Ochaco's refusal to accept her warped sense of love and in response to Twice's death.^{[ch. 347–349]} Using a sample of Twice's blood to replicate his Quirk in order to overwhelm the heroes who are preventing All for One from reaching Tomura in the final battle, she later battles Ochaco again with the latter successfully reaching out to her. In the aftermath of their battle, Toga sacrifices her own life by performing a blood transfusion that saves Ochaco from the verge of death.^{[ch. 395]}

Jin Bubaigawara (分倍河原 仁, Bubaigawara Jin) / Twice (トゥワイス, Tuwaisu)
Voiced by: Daichi Endō (Japanese); Newton Pittman (English)

A villain who initially suffered an existential crisis along with having an apparent form of dissociative personality disorder due to an Existential crisis that resulted from abusing his Quirk Double (倍にする/折り曲げる/倍/代り役/二重/身代わり/替え玉/代役/二塁打/倍増/二倍/ダブル, Bai ni Suru/Orimageru/Bai/Kawari-yaku/Nijū/Migawari/Kaedama/Daiyaku/Niruida/Baizō/Ni-bai/Daburu). This Quirk allows him to create copies of anything he touches. He twice enjoyed assuming dramatic poses and eccentric facial expressions, constantly contradicting himself, making a statement in his normal voice and then immediately saying the opposite in a different tone.^{[ch. 77]} During his confrontation with Skeptic's clones, Jin was revealed to create clones to compensate for his loneliness, before being traumatized when his clones got tired of being bossed around and then ending up killing each other after he was knocked out. He has since refused to use the quirk on himself. He joined the League of Villains because they accepted his flaws and made him feel comfortable in his own skin. His desperation to find friends leads him to trust others very quickly. This also leaves him vulnerable to betrayal and emotionally devastated when people such as Overhaul or Hawks turn on him. When injured by the fake clones Skeptic created, he moved past his trauma after realizing that he was the original, and he did not hesitate to protect Himiko Toga.^{[ch. 229–230]} Though his clones were still conflicted over not being originals, they are able to work past it to achieve their goals. It is shown that even after conquering his inner demons Jin still occasionally experiences relapses, suggesting that he still has split personality issues.^{[ch. 240]} He is fatally wounded by Hawks during the Jaku Hospital Raid, dying in Toga's arms after saving her from being captured by the heroes.^{[ep 116]}

Atsuhiro Sako (迫 圧紘, Sako Atsuhiro) / Mr. Compress (Mr. コンプレス, Misutā Konpuresu)
Voiced by: Tsuguo Mogami (Japanese); Kent Williams (English)

A flashy villain and former stage magician whose Quirk Compress (圧縮する/湿布/コンプレス, Asshuku Suru/Shippu/Konpuresu) allows him to instantly shrink anything in a spherical area into a small marble without actually damaging it. Before he was recruited by the League of Villains, Atsuhiro worked as an entertainer and was the great-great-grandson of Oji Harima, a criminal from the distant past, who stole from false heroes and preaching reformation while giving back to the people on the streets. As a member of the peerless thief's lineage, Atsuhiro was instilled with the values of fighting corruption and exposing injustices.^{[ch. 81, 294]} During the League's meeting with the Shie Hassaikai, Atsuhiro loses his left arm when he attempts to take down Overhaul; he has it replaced with a prosthetic.^{[ch. 125]} During the Jaku Hospital Raid, he sustains grievous injuries while saving the other members of the League from being captured by heroes and is left behind on the battlefield by All For One.^{[ch. 296]}

Shuichi Iguchi (伊口 秀一, Iguchi Shūichi) / Spinner (スピナー, Supinā)
Voiced by: Ryō Iwasaki (Japanese); Larry Brantley (English)

The archnemesis of Mezo Shoji, a villain whose Quirk Gecko (守宮/ヤモリ, Yamori) gives him the appearance and abilities of a gecko. He was inspired to join the League by Stain and admires that Hero Killer so much that he modeled his look and fighting style on his. He wants to change society due to the prejudice he suffered on account of his appearance.^{[ep 111]} Spinner has little respect for heroes, purposely treading on Pixie-Bob's face, grinning as she lies on the ground beneath his foot, unconscious and bleeding as a result of his and Magne's earlier attack, due to the fact that he believes heroes are corrupt.^{[ch. 73]} Despite being a villain, he seems to have a sense of morality and is shocked upon learning of Tomura's true goal of eradicating society altogether, rather than reshaping it to make it better. His dedication to Stain's ideology also has him question some of the League's actions, such as attacking a police convoy to exact revenge on Overhaul.^{[ch. 160]} During the Paranormal Liberation War, he tells Himiko Toga to come back to them safely when she leaves to confront Ochaco Uraraka, and also aids Tomura when he was unconscious, and gives him a signature hand mask to wake him up, which helps him to achieve his dream.^{[ch. 295]} While facing Tentacole, Spinner is revealed to have been enhanced with two additional Quirks: a Body Bulk Quirk to increase his muscles and size along with the Quirk Scalemail to augment his strength and defense, both of which come at the cost of his higher functions, thus undermining the heteromorphs' uprising and allowing Mezo to reach out and end the riot peacefully.^{[ch. 371]} Izuku later passes Tomura's last words on to a convalescent Spinner and he pledges to make Tomura's history known once he recovers.^{[ch. 426]} In the Epilogue Arc, Spinner is visited in the Central Hospital by Izuku where a doctor informs Izuku that Spinner is slowly becoming a Nomu because of the extra Scalemale and Body Bulk Quirks. After a breakdown, Spinner plans to write about Tomura's legacy.^{[ch. 427]}

Kenji Hikiishi (引石 健磁, Hikīshi Kenji) / Magne (マグネ, Magune)
Voiced by: Satoru Inoue (Japanese); Jeremy Inman (English)

A transgender woman whose Quirk Magnetism (磁性/磁気/磁力, Jisei/Jiki/Jiryoku) allows her to magnetize others near her. Magne has a cruel and brutal personality, befitting a murderous criminal. According to Tiger, she has committed nine armed robberies, three murders, and twenty-nine attempted murders.^{[ch. 75]} During her time in the League, Magne was shown to be quite perceptive and quick thinking, as shown when she deduced Izuku Midoriya had been the one to defeat Muscular and he needed to be put down. And she was the one who came up with the idea to go after the students, after they rescued Katsuki Bakugo.^{[ch. 77, 91]} It was revealed that she had an unnamed friend who still supported her decision to live life the way she chose, despite not possessing the courage to do the same thing herself. She is brutally killed by Overhaul after recklessly attacking the latter with her Quirk.

Goto Imatsuji (今筋強斗, Imasuji Gōto) / Muscular (マスキュラー, Masukyurā)
Voiced by: Kousuke Takaguchi (Japanese); Jim Foronda (English)

A malefic villain whose Quirk Muscle Augmentation (筋肉増強, Kin'niku Zōkyō) allows him to manipulate and enlarge the muscle fibers beneath his skin, granting him immense strength, speed, stamina, and durability. Befitting his appearance, Muscular has a very sadistic and bloodthirsty personality. He openly admits that he wants to use his Quirk freely to kill. Muscular was responsible for killing the Water Hose duo. During the Forest Training Arc, Muscular took part in the mission to capture Bakugo for the League of Villains and was imprisoned in Tartarus after being defeated by Izuku.^{[ch. 83, p. 4]} Although he later escapes from Tartarus during a prison break led by All For One, he is ultimately defeated again by Izuku and re-imprisoned for his crimes.^{[ep 132]}

Mustard (マスタード, Masutādo)
Voiced by: Kiyotaka Furushima (Japanese); Daman Mills (English)

A teenage villain whose Quirk Gas (喋る/瓦斯/気体/ガス, Shaberu/Kitai/Gasu) allows him to generate vast amounts of a toxic sleeping gas from his body. As he is not immune to his own Quirk, Mustard wears a gas mask that is attached to two oxygen tanks on his back. He has been shown to be pragmatic. Mustard believes that no matter how impressive a person's Quirk is, it does not change the fact that they are still only human. During the Forest Training Arc, Mustard took part in the mission to capture Bakugo for the League of Villains, but he was defeated by Tetsutetsu and arrested by the police.^{[ch. 79]}

Moonfish (ムーンフィッシュ, Mūnfisshu)
Voiced by: Shuhei Matsuda (Japanese); Daman Mills (English)

An insane and cannibalistic villain whose Quirk Blade-Tooth (歯刃/ブレードトゥース, Shijin/Burēdotūsu) allows him to lengthen, sharpen, and manipulate his teeth into arrays of powerful blades. During the Jump Festa '21 event, Horikoshi confirmed that the character was inspired by the Cenobites from the Hellraiser franchise. Moonfish is an insane, laconic individual who talks to himself and is fascinated with consuming flesh. He has a habit of repeating key information to himself in order to stay focused on his objectives.^{[ep 41]} During the Forest Training Arc, Moonfish took part in the mission to capture Bakugo for the League of Villains and was imprisoned in Tartarus after being defeated by Tokoyami's Quirk.^{[ch. 83, p. 4]} He later escaped from Tartarus during the prison break led by All For One.^{[ch. 297]} During the "Final War" arc, Moonfish sported a new outfit and fights the Pro Heroes at Okuto Island.^{[ch. 347]} He was defeated by the Pro Heroes and arrested.^{[ch. 406]}

Gigantomachia (ギガントマキア, Gigantomakia)
Voiced by: Yasuhiro Mamiya (Japanese); Cris George (English)

An immensely powerful kaiju-sized villain who has multiple Quirks and is deeply loyal to All For One. According to Garaki, the Nomu were based on him. Gigantomachia appears to be a polite person at first, but he becomes impatient and aggressive to those who are uncooperative with him. If someone manages to help him out though, he will leave and avoid a confrontation.^{[ch. 144]} He is a faithful servant to All For One and questions Tomura's worthiness as his successor. His devotion and obedience to All For One are so great that simply hearing a recording of All For One's voice can keep him from breaking out into a blind rage.^{[ep 108]} Eventually, Gigantomachia begins to acknowledge Tomura as All For One's successor after the fight with Re-Destro, even shedding a tear of joy at Tomura standing proud over his defeated foe.^{[ch. 239]} During the Jaku Hospital Raid, he is sedated by Kirishima, defeated by Endeavor, and left behind on the battlefield by All For One.^{[ch. 297]} During the final battle, he is reawakened from his incarceration at the Jaku Hospital. Once Gigantomachia reaches All For One, he lashes out at him for his betrayal leading All For One to kill him.

==== Underlings ====
When Shigaraki promoted the campaign of the League of Villains, he led an assortment of Underlings to the U.S.J. to attack it with the plans to eliminate All Might only to be defeated by the students and teachers where most of them were subdued by Eraserhead's fighting skills. None of them were named until My Hero Academia: The Strongest Hero.

Victor (ビクター, Bikutā)
An underling who sports a Quirk that gives him gun-tipped fingers that shoot bullets.
Needle Hair (針髪, Hari Kami)
An underling who sports a Quirk that enables her to harden and control her hair as well as launching her dreadlocks like a missile.
Stitched Giant (ステッチジャイアント, Sutetchijaianto)
A hulking underling in a three-horned gas mask who sports a Quirk that enables him to shoot lasers from his face.
Steel Bulwark (鋼の防波堤, Hagane no bōhatei)
An underling with rocky skin who sports a body morph Quirk that enables him to have two extra arms.
Chomper (チャンパー, Chanpā)
A Venus flytrap-headed underling who sports a Quirk that enables him to turn his body parts into different plants that can also heal his allies.
Martial Hair (マーシャルヘア, Māsharuhea)
An underling who sports a Quirk that enables her to control her hair and shape the tip of her ponytails into weapons.
Muscle Man (筋肉質な男性, Kin'nikushitsuna dansei)
A muscular underling in a face mask that covers his mouth who sports a Quirk that charges his muscles up for a severe blow. If he overcharges it, his muscles get severely sore.
Sickle Claw (鎌の爪, Kama no tsume)
An underling with an elongated head, eyestalks, and a Quirk that gives him sharp iron claws.
Thousand Eyes (サウザンドアイズ, Sauzandoaizu)
A genderless humanoid paper rune underling with red eyes on it whose Quirk enables it to split into many paper runes and create clones of itself.
Minotaurus (ミノタウロス, Minotaurosu)
A one-eyed hulking underling with blue skin. In the anime, he sported horns which is associated with his unnamed Quirk.
Four-Armed Zealot (四腕の熱狂者, Shi ude no nekkyō-sha)
A lean underling in a gas mask whose Quirk grants him extra arms.
Hanzo Suiden (半電水伝, Han-den suiden)
Voiced by: Kenta Okuma
A tall muscular underling whose Quirk enables him to manipulate water. He and his fellow aquatic underlings attacked Izuku, Tsuyu, and Minoru in the Shipwreck Zone before being defeated when Izuku used the Delaware Smash to trap them in a water vortex.
Sharkyonara (シャルキオナラ, Sharukionara)
A humanoid shark underling whose Quirk grants him the abilities of a shark except for breathing underwater causing him to wear a diving cylinder.
Oxy-Man (オキシマン, Okishiman)
An underling whose Quirk enables him to produce oxygen which comes in handy when swimming underwater.
Invisible Wall (見えない壁, Mienai kabe)
A humanoid chameleon underling whose Quirk grants him the abilities of a chameleon including camouflage. He and the underlings with him ambushed Kirishima and Bakugo in the Haunted Zone before he was defeated by Bakugo.
Gravitational Spring (重力の春, Jūryoku no haru)
A skinny underling whose Quirk enables him to stretch his arms in order to grab things from a distance. He and the underlings with him ambushed Kyoka, Momo, and Denki in the Mountain Zone where he was defeated by Denki when he slams his fist into Denki's electrified state.
Hard Head (ハードヘッド, Hādoheddo)
A well-built underling in a full helmet whose Quirk enables him to expand his muscles and strengthen them. He was incapacitated by Denki.
Tesla (テスラ, Tesura)
A tall lean underling in a skull mask whose Quirk enables him to harvest and control electrical currents which comes in handy when blocking other electrical signals. Tesla bested Denki in battle before being defeated by Snipe.

==== Nomu ====
The League of Villains also makes use of the Nomu (脳無, Nōmu; lit. 'Brainless'), monsters with exposed brains and different Quirks who were created by All For One and Daruma from deceased individuals. They are also called Artificial Humans and lack brain function, making them obedient to whoever uses them. The Nomu have been used by the League of Villains even after they merged with the Meta-Liberation Army to form the Paranormal Liberation Front.

Each of the Nomu are separated into different tiers:

- The Lower Tier Nomu serve as the foot soldiers and are the weakest of the Nomu. Some of the useful members of this tier are by Doctor Garaki's side.
- The Middle Tier Nomu have more colors to them.
- The Upper Tier Nomu can match blows with the Heroes. Each one is supposed to be as strong as 10 people.
- The Near High-End Nomu are incomplete Nomu that lack any intelligence.
- The High-End Nomu are the strongest of the Nomu and possess six Quirks including Super Regeneration.

The prequel manga My Hero Academia: Vigilantes reveals that the current version of the Nomu was created in response to how they can defeat even the mightiest hero through sheer force of will.^{[VGLS ch. 125, p. 12–15]}

Besides Kurogiri, the following are the known Nomu:

Nomu that attacked U.S.J.
Voiced by: Tsuguo Mogami (Japanese); Justin Cook (English)

A Nomu with Shock Absorption and Super Radiation that accompanied Tomura, Kurogami, and some League of Villains recruits to attack the Unforeseen Simulation Joint.^{[ch. 11]} This Nomu was responsible for giving Eraser Head his scar before he was defeated by All Might.^{[ch. 21]}

Nomu Trio

Three Nomu who were responsible for attacking Hosu City. The Four-Eyed Nomu possessed the Quirks Possession and Release, Muscle Augmentation, and Tongue Web. The Winged Nomu possessed an unnamed wing Quirk. The Eyeless Nomu sports Super Regeneration. During the attack on Hosu City, the Four-Eyed Nomu was defeated by Gran Torino, the Winged Nomu was killed by Endeavor, and the Eyeless Nomu was killed by Stain.^{[ch. 50]}

Chainsaw Nomu
Voiced by: Daman Mills

A Nomu with an unnamed tool arm quirk that enabled it to grow different tool-tipped arms where four of them had chainsaws, one had a drill, and another had a claw hammer. It accompanied Dabi and the Vanguard Action Squad to crash the U.A.'s forest training. The Chainsaw Nomu attacked Momo Yaoyorozu and Yosetsu Awase before being recalled by Dabi following Bakugo's capture.^{[ch. 81]} During the "Hideout Raid" arc, the Chainsaw Nomu was restrained by Mt. Lady.

Hood (フード, Fūdo)
Voiced by: Tsuguo Mogami (Japanese); Daman Mills (English)

A highly advanced and sentient High-End Nomu, made from an unnamed street punk, who attacks Endeavor and Hawks in Kyushu. Hood showed signs of obedience and loyalty to his master. He speaks with a stutter and uses broken grammar.^{[ep 87]} He is revealed to possess six different Quirks and is able to severely injure Endeavor before the latter incinerates him with his ultimate super move Prominence Burn.^{[ch. 190]}

Chubs (おでぶ, Odebu)

A sentient High-End Nomu with robotic thrusters for legs, mouths on his hands, and a metal grid grafted to his head that is kept in Daruma's lab beneath Jaku Hospital. His Quirks include an unnamed body expansion Quirk, an unnamed mouth Quirk, and an unnamed metal teeth Quirk.^{[ch. 221]} Dring the Jaku Hospital Raid, Chubs was defeated by Eraser Head and Crust and is later among the Nomu killed by Tomura's Decay.^{[ch. 262]}

Woman (ウーマン, Ūman)
Voiced by: Arisa Sekine (Japanese); Bryson Baugus (English)

A sentient High-End Nomu with a feminine body and a mouth hidden in her chin that is kept in Daruma's lab beneath Jaku Hospital. Her Quirks include Liquifecation and Rupture.^{[ch. 221]} During the Jaku Hospital Raid, Woman tried to keep the Pro Heroes from reaching Daruma only to be defeated by Present Mic and X-Less^{[ch. 269]} Woman was among the Nomu that were killed by Tomura's Decay.^{[ch. 271]}

Robot (ロボット, Robotto)

A sentient High-End Nomu with implanted robotic parts and wearing a robotic helmet that is kept in Daruma's lab beneath Jaku Hospital. His Quirks involve an unnamed spacial distortion ability and an unnamed eye beam ability.^{[ch. 221]} During the Jaku Hospital Raid, Robot was killed by Mirko after it tore off one of her arms.^{[ch. 262]}

Johnny (ジョン, Jon)

A small Nomu with a cable-like bottom that is owned by Daruma and has the ability to teleport people by spraying a goo that makes its recipient a medium for the teleportation. Johnny wears a helmet that enables Daruma to control where anyone is teleported to.^{[ch. 222]} During the Jaku Hospital Raid, he was killed by the falling door as Mirko breaks through to the laboratory.^{[ch. 261]}

Mocha (モカ, Moka)
Voiced by: Bryson Baugus

A small Nomu with human noses for ears and a spinal tail that is owned by Daruma. He has the Quirk Double that enables him to make a copy of someone.^{[ch. 261]}

Eleph (ゾウ, Zō)

A sentient bulky elephant-like High-End Nomu that is kept in Daruma's lab beneath Jaku Hospital. His Quirks include an unnamed elephant Quirk and an unnamed arm bulk up Quirk.^{[ch. 261]} During the Jaku Hospital Raid, Eleph tried to prevent the Pro Heroes from getting to Daruma only to be defeated by them. He was later among the Nomu killed by Tomura's Decay.^{[ch. 271]}

Ribby (アバラ, Abara)
Voiced by: Matthew David Rudd

A sentient High End Nomu that is kept in Daruma's lab beneath Jaku Hospital. His Quirks include an unnamed antennae Quirk and an unnamed rib cage Quirk. During the Jaku Hospital Raid, Ribby tried to prevent the Pro Heroes from getting to Daruma only to be defeated by them.^{[ch. 261]} When Tomura awakened and started using his decay, Ribby tried to grab Eraser Head only for Crust to sacrifice himself so that Eraser Head can get away.^{[ch. 271]}

=== Meta Liberation Army ===
The Meta Liberation Army (異能解放軍, Inō Kaihō-gun; M.L.A.) is a powerful organization of villains originally founded and led by the infamous villain Destro (デストロ, Desutoro). They refer to Quirks as Meta Abilities (メタ能力, Meta Nōryoku) and believe that the free usage of Quirks is a basic human right. They also serve as the titular main antagonists in the Meta Liberation Army Arc.^{[ch. 218–240]}

They are considered as one of the most infamous villain groups, and their leader is compared to the likes of All For One.^{[ch. 171]} During the time of his imprisonment, Destro wrote the Meta Liberation War, an autobiography in which he expresses his ideology of Quirks liberation, and which undergoes several reprints due to its popularity.^{[ch. 218]}

After the Meta Liberation Army is defeated by the League of Villains, Tomura merges the two organizations to create the Paranormal Liberation Front.

Rikiya Yotsubashi (四ツ橋 力也, Yotsubashi Rikiya) / Re-Destro (デストロ再, Desutoro-sai)
Voiced by: Hiroaki Hirata (Japanese); Sonny Strait (English)

The condescending grand commander of the Meta Liberation Army and a descendant of Destro. His Quirk Stress (アクセントをつける/重視/応力/ストレス, Akusento o Tsukeru/Jūshi/Ōryoku/Sutoresu) grants him the ability to convert his stress and anger into raw power, which turns him into a hulking monster and significantly enhances his strength.^{[ch. 232–233, 238]} At first, Re-Destro seems to be a completely normal and balanced person. However, this persona is merely a façade, for he is a devout follower of his ancestor's ideals and believes that Quirks should be celebrated rather than suppressed and controlled. Re-Destro does not hesitate to torture and kill people in order to achieve his goals, and he does not tolerate lack of respect for either Destro or the Meta Liberation Army. When his secretary Miyashita defined Destro's book as pretentious and the Liberation Army as terrorists, he snaps his neck and kills him on the spot. However, he seemed to show some remorse by shedding tears afterwards.^{[ch. 218]} He attempts to wipe out the League of Villains, but ultimately fails when Tomura defeats him in battle and damages his lower legs, prompting him to submit. He joined the Paranormal Liberation Front as one of its lieutenants and now uses a high-tech wheelchair due to his damaged legs being amputated. He later got his legs replaced with cybernetics.^{[ch. 239–240]} During the Jaku Hospital Raid, he is defeated by Edgeshot and arrested for his crimes.^{[ch. 296]}

Koku Hanabata (花畑 孔腔, Hanabata Kōkū) / Trumpet (トランペット, Toranpetto)
Voiced by: Junji Majima (Japanese); Adam McArthur (English)

A manipulative and levelheaded politician who serves as one of the executives of the Meta Liberation Army. His Quirk Incite (そそる/そそのかす/促す/煽る/煽動, Sosoru/Sosonokasu/Unagasu/Aoru/Sendō) allows him to boost the physical and mental abilities of his subordinates with his voice. Koku portrays himself as a calm and levelheaded man, as he was not fazed by Curious' death, and instead displayed his intelligence and skills in manipulation by instead taking advantage of her death, along with using his Quirk to further motivate and strengthen his comrades instead.^{[ch. 227]} He is also shown to be arrogant as seen when Spinner compares himself to the Meta Liberation Army and states how they were equal, earning his malice by insinuating that Spinner was his equal.^{[ep 111]} He is later defeated by the heroes during the Jaku Hospital Raid and arrested for his crimes.

Tomoyasu Chikazoku (近属 友保, Chikazoku Tomoyasu) / Skeptic (スケプティック, Sukeputikku)
Voiced by: Tomokazu Sugita (Japanese); Benjamin Diskin (Season 5), Anthony Bowling (Season 6–present) (English)

A tech-savvy executive member of the Meta Liberation Army whose Quirk Anthropomorph (擬人化/人形, Gijin-ka/Hitogata) allows him to take a human-sized object and turn it into an exact lookalike of any given person, which he can then control like a puppet. In battle, Skeptic is a ruthless and calculating opponent. He calmly ordered his puppets to break Twice's arms to stop him from resisting further, and he reacted to Himiko's reawakening with only the minor irritation that he would have to adjust his puppets' strength to kill her.^{[ch. 228]} As he initially failed to capture Twice and kill Toga, he immediately became obsessed with not failing and falsely assuring himself and his superior that everything was as predicted. He later acted recklessly by entering into the front lines of combat himself in order not to fail, despite knowing that he was completely abandoning the strategic advantage afforded to him by his Quirk in being able to combat someone in a safe location.^{[ch. 229–230, 233]} He is very loyal to Re-Destro: even after the Army merged with the League of Villains to become the Paranormal Liberation Front, he still cared for and abided by his former master's wishes. He is the only executive member of the Meta Liberation Army who was not captured by the heroes during the Jaku Hospital Raid.^{[ch. 295]} When his hideout is found during the Final War arc, Skeptic was apprehended by the Pro Heroes led by Hound Dog.^{[ch. 406]}

Chitose Kizuki (気月 置歳, Kizuki Chitose) / Curious (キュリオス, Kyuriosu)
Voiced by: Takako Honda (Japanese); Tara Sands (English)

A blue-skinned executive member of the Meta Liberation Army who gets her villain name from her very inquisitive personality. Her Quirk Landmine (地雷, Jirai) allows her to turn anything she touches into a bomb. As described by her Liberation Army code name, Chitose is an immensely curious woman who is highly invested in her journalistic pursuits. She had been inspired to claim the hearts of the people with her stories, all for the benefit of their villain group.^{[ch. 225]} She is killed by Toga during the war between the League of Villains and the Meta Liberation Army that takes place in Deika City, where Toga copies Uravity's abilities and uses them on Curious and those with her.^{[ch. 226]}

Geten (外典) / Iceman (氷男, Kōriotoko)
Voiced by: Seiichirō Yamashita (Japanese); Khoi Dao (English)

An Inuit-like member of the Meta Liberation Army whose Quirk Ice Manipulation (氷操/の操作, Kōri Misao/no Sōsa) allows him to freely control all nearby ice. Geten is a loyal warrior of the Meta Liberation Army and is a devout believer in its principles. He feels greatly indebted to Re-Destro for granting him more power, and he desires to create a world where the strongest supervillains stand at the top of the hierarchy. During the war between the League of Villains and the Meta Liberation Army, Geten faces off against Dabi and fights the latter to a stalemate.^{[ch. 227–238]} He is later defeated by Cementoss during the Jaku Hospital Raid and arrested for his crimes.

Tatsuyuki Tokoname (常滑達行, Tokoname Tatsuyuki) / Slidin' Go (スライディン・ゴー, Suraidin Gō)
Voiced by: Takumu Miyazono (Japanese); Bill Butts (English)

A false hero who possesses an unnamed sliding Quirk and works as a double agent for the Meta Liberation Army. Tatsuyuki is fiercely loyal to his superiors, and he is strict with others for not following proper etiquette. This was shown when he chastised Hawks for not notifying them of his leave, stating that he is of a higher rank within the Liberation Army, only to back down when confronted by Skeptic.^{[ch. 243]} During the Jaku Hospital Raid, he is exposed by Death Arms and arrested for his crimes.^{[ch. 259, 296]}

=== Shie Hassaikai ===
The Shie Hassaikai (死穢八斎會/四絵八彩会, Shie Hassaikai/Shi e Hachi Aya-kai) (lit. "Eight Precepts of Death") is a Yakuza group that intends to gain power by producing and dealing Quirk-destroying drugs on the black market. It is one of many Yakuza groups that run the criminal underworld in Japan. A man known only as "The Boss" originally led this organization and brought Kai Chisaki into it. His generation fell from prominence during the rise of All Might and Heroes. The Yakuza were pushed into the shadows and lived under constant surveillance.^{[ch. 125]} They also serve as the titular main antagonists of the Shie Hassaikai Arc.^{[ch. 122–162]}

Boss (八斎會組長, Hassaikai Kumichō)
Voiced by: Naomi Kusumi (Japanese); R. Bruce Elliott (English)

The unnamed former crime boss of the Shie Hassaikai, Overhaul's foster father, and Eri's maternal grandfather. After refusing to consent to Overhaul's inhumane master plan to bring the Yakuza back to power through a Quirk-destroying drug, he is secretly put into a comatose state by Overhaul. Overhaul intended to revive the Boss after using his position as the new head of the Shie Hassaikai to realize his goals.^{[ch. 158]} But that becomes impossible after the League of Villains mutilates Overhaul's arms to render him unable to restore his leader. Overhaul later escapes Tartarus so he can visit his former leader and beg for his forgiveness.^{[ch. 159–160, 297]} Overhaul realizes that Eri can restore him.^{[ch. 316]}

Kai Chisaki (治崎 廻, Chisaki Kai) / Overhaul (オーバーホール, Ōbāhōru)
Voiced by: Kenjiro Tsuda (Japanese); Kellen Goff, Caitlin Glass (young) (English)

The mysophobic crime boss of the Shie Hassaikai. His Quirk Overhaul (オーバーホール, Ōbāhōru) enables him to disassemble anything he touches, as well as reassemble it in any configuration he desires. He can also use his Quirk to fuse himself with others, which enables him to use their Quirks, and heal himself of any injuries he sustains in combat. Prior to being adopted by the boss, he endorsed the hypothesis that a Quirk is a viral disease that is spread through rats. After he was adopted by the boss, he was seen as trouble but tried to hone himself into an honorable Yakuza. He is obsessed with restoring the Yakuza to their former glory and attempts to turn his dreams into reality by creating a Quirk-destroying drug and serum and then monopolizing it on the black market. But he was defeated by Deku and sent to Tartarus for his crimes. The League of Villains, having sabotaged the Shie Hassaikai to avenge Magne, intercept Overhaul's prison transport and destroy Overhaul's hands so that he cannot use his Quirk again.^{[ch. 159–160]} Escaping during the Tartarus breakout, Overhaul becomes Lady Nagant's partner in leading her to Deku in return to be taken to see the former Shie Hassakai boss so he can beg for his forgiveness.^{[ch. 297]} After being sent back to prison and realizing that Eri can restore the boss in his stead, Overhaul agrees to Deku's condition of seeking the girl's forgiveness in return for visitation rights.^{[ch. 316]}

Hari Kurono (玄野 針, Kurono Hari) / Chronostasis (クロノスタシス, Kuronosutashisu)
Voiced by: Takumi Asahina (Japanese); Anthony Bowling (English)

Overhaul's childhood friend and loyal personal assistant. His Quirk Chronostasis (クロノスタシス, Kuronosutashisu) enables him to slow down the movements of anything he hits with his clock-hand-like hair.^{[ep 75]} Hari is a composed and cold-hearted individual, as shown when he was unfazed that Overhaul kills a fellow subordinate, and does not have objections to Eri's inhumane treatment. Being Overhaul's assistant, he is loyal to his leader.^{[ch. 129]} During the Shie Hassaikai Raid, he is defeated by Suneater and arrested by the police.

Joi Irinaka (入中 常衣, Irinaka Jōi) / Mimic (ミミック, Mimikku)
Voiced by: Yasuhiro Mamiya (Japanese); Derick Snow (English)

The general manager of the Shie Hassaikai. His Quirk Mimicry (人真似/物真似/真似/擬態, Hitomane/Monomane/Mane/Gitai) allows him to transfer his own body and mind into solid objects, which he can then manipulate and control like his actual body. He generally uses his Quirk to disguise himself as a black-beaked hand puppet. Like all of the members of the Shie Hassaikai group, Joi is loyal to Overhaul, and he becomes enraged whenever people show disrespectful or threatening behavior towards his boss.^{[ch. 132, p. 5]} He is hot-tempered and easily lets his emotions run wild, even if it costs him his stealth advantage.^{[ch. 149]} During the Shie Hassaikai Raid, he is defeated by Deku and Eraser Head, and arrested by the police.

==== Eight Bullets ====
The Eight Bullets (八つの弾丸/鉄砲玉 八斎衆, Yattsu no Dangan/Teppōdama Hassaishū) are Overhaul's eight elite henchman. Most of them were cast out by society and had no reason to live until they were given a purpose by Overhaul. Ironically, despite the fact that they are fiercely loyal to him, Overhaul regards the Eight Bullets as expendable pawns and only sees them for their utilitarian value to his cause.

Shin Nemoto (音本 真, Nemoto Shin)
Voiced by: Takayuki Masuda (Japanese); John Burgmeier (English)

A former con artist whose Quirk Confession (懺悔/自白/告白/真実吐き, Zange/Jihaku/Kokuhaku/Makoto Tsuki) enables him to force people to answer his questions truthfully. He became disillusioned with society when he could not find someone worthy of his trust and joined the Hassaikai upon realizing Overhaul's villainous but honest intentions.^{[ch. 151]} During the Shie Hassaikai Raid, he is defeated by Lemillion and arrested by the police.

Rikiya Katsukame (活瓶 力也, Katsukame Rikiya)
Voiced by: Hiroaki Okuda (Japanese); Chris Guerrero (English)

A hulking gangster whose Quirk Vitality Stealing (活力 吸収/バイタリティスティール, Katsuryoku Kyūshū/Baitaritisutīru) allows him to absorb the stamina of his adversaries, simultaneously strengthening himself and weakening his opponents. During the Shie Hassaikai Raid, he is defeated by the combined efforts of Nejire, Uravity, Froppy, and Ryukyu, and arrested by the police.

Toya Setsuno (窃野 トウヤ, Setsuno Tōya)
Voiced by: KENN (Japanese); Derek Whitener (English)

A fanatic villain whose Quirk Larceny (窃取/強盗/窃盗, Sesshu/Gōtō/Settō) allows him to telekinetically steal any objects that his target possesses. The objects that can be stolen include even manifestations of others' Quirks. He joined the Hassaikai after losing everything he had to a traitorous lover and being put in tremendous debt.^{[ch. 141, p. 11]} During the Shie Hassaikai Raid, he is defeated by Suneater and arrested by the police.

Yu Hojo (宝生 結, Hōjō Yū)
Voiced by: Kenichirou Matsuda (Japanese); Eric Lopez (English)

A masked villain whose Quirk Crystallize (結晶化する/させる, /Kesshō-ka Suru/sa Suru) allows him to grow sharp, durable crystals all over his body. He joined the Hassaikai after being beaten almost to death by a former colleague and discarded on the street. During the Shie Hassaikai Raid, he is defeated by Suneater and arrested by the police.

Soramitsu Tabe (多部 空満, Tabe Soramitsu)
Voiced by: Kengo Tsuji (Japanese); Jeramey Kraatz (English)

An insane villain who is obsessed with eating. His Quirk Food (召し上がり物/兵糧/兵粮/飯/食べ物/食料/食物/食/フード, Meshiagarimono/Hyōrō/Hyōrō/Meshi/Tabemono/Shokuryō/Shokumotsu/Shoku/Fūdo) allows his teeth to easily chew through and consume any solid substance, no matter how durable it is. Soramitsu appears to be insane. He is always hungry and thus obsessed with eating. He joined the Hassaikai after being spurned by society for his abnormal personality. During the Shie Hassaikai Raid, he is defeated by Suneater and arrested by the police.

Kendo Rappa (乱波 肩動, Rappa Kendō) / The Rapper (ザ ラッパー, Za Rappā)
Voiced by: Shouhei Kajikawa (Japanese); Eric Rolon (English)

A battle-crazed villain who thrives on bloodshed and only cares about seeking battle. His Quirk Strongarm (強肩/ストロングアーム, Kyōken/Sutoronguāmu) enables him to rotate his shoulders at extreme speeds, allowing him to attack his targets with a near-endless barrage of bullet punches. He believes that it is unbecoming for a fighter to use weapons and that everyone should fight only with the power of their bodies.^{[ch. 142]} He joined the Hassaikai after being easily defeated by Overhaul in a fight. Since then, he has followed Overhaul's orders but has no loyalty to him.^{[ch. 146]} During the Shie Hassaikai Raid, he is defeated by Red Riot and Fat Gum and arrested by the police.

Hekiji Tengai (天蓋 壁慈, Tengai Hekiji)
Voiced by: Jun Miyamoto (Japanese); Shawn Gann (English)

A monk-like villain whose Quirk Barrier (関所/支障/難関/障害/関門/障壁/バリアー, Sekisho/Shishō/Nankan/Shōgai/Kanmon/Shōheki/Baria) allows him to create a dome-shaped force field around himself and his allies. Hekiji used to be a devout Buddhist. He is recruited by Overhaul after Kendo Rappa's tendency to challenge people to fights became obnoxious.^{[vol. 16, omake]} During the Shie Hassaikai Raid, he is defeated by Red Riot and Fat Gum and arrested by the police.

Deidoro Sakaki (酒木 泥泥, Sakaki Deidoro)
Voiced by: Kouji Takahashi (Japanese); Zeno Robinson (English)

An alcoholic villain whose Quirk Sloshed (ばちゃばちゃさせる/泥酔/スロッシュド, Bachaba Cha sa Seru/Deisui/Surosshudo) enables him to subject anyone near him to severe dizziness, throwing off their sense of balance and putting them in a state similar to being drunk. Befitting his Quirk, Deidoro seems to be an alcoholic, as he keeps drinking even while talking or engaging his enemy. He is shown to anger easily.^{[ch. 150]} During the Shie Hassaikai Raid, he is defeated by Lemillion and arrested by the police.

=== Humarise ===
Humarise (ユマライズ, Yumaraizu) is a global cult and the main villains of My Hero Academia: World Heroes' Mission. They seek to eliminate Quirks from the world to avert the catastrophe foretold by the Quirk Singularity Doomsday Theory.

Flect Turn (フレクト・ターン, Furekuto Tān)
Voiced by: Kazuya Nakai (Japanese); Robbie Daymond (English)

The main antagonist of My Hero Academia: World Heroes' Mission and the leader of Humarise. His Quirk Reflect (案ずる/按ずる/照り返す/写し出す/写す/省みる/映す/反映する/リフレクト, Anzuru/Anzuru/Terikaesu/Utsushidasu/Utsusu/Kaerimiru/Utsusu/Han'ei Suru/Rifurekuto) enables him to reflect all types of energy, including any attack and its effects, back to the user, as well as storing it for later use. He was defeated by Deku and later arrested by the Otheon police.

Beros (ベロス, Berosu)
Voiced by: Mariya Ise (Japanese); Michelle Rojas (English)

A female member of Humarise. Her Quirk Long Bow (ロング ボウ, Rongu Bou) allows her to morph her left hand into a bow, as well as being able to control the object she shoots out of it. However, she cannot create her own ammunition.

Sidero (シデロ, Shidero)
Voiced by: Yūichirō Umehara (Japanese); D.C. Douglas (English)

A masked member of Humarise. His Quirk Iron Ball (鉄球/アイアン ボール, Tekkyū/Aian Bōru) allows him to create iron balls and shoot them from his knuckles. He was defeated by Shoto and later arrested by the Otheon police.

Serpenters (サーペンターズ, Sāpentāzu)
Voiced by: Junya Enoki (Japanese); Mike Haimoto (English)

A villain duo of two twin brothers – Ena (エナ, Ena) and Dio (ディオ, Dio) – who are members of Humarise. Their Quirk Sword Kill (ソード キル, Sōdo Kiru) allows each of them to manifest flexible swords from their arms and shoulders. Both of them are defeated by Bakugo and later arrested by the Otheon police.

Leviathan (レヴィアタン, Reviatan)
Voiced by: Shogo Sakata (Japanese); Marcus D. Stimac (English)

A hulking monstrous villain who is a member of Humarise. His Quirk Helical Scythe (ヘリカルサイズ, Herikarusaizu) allows him to create a powerful water current from his fingertips and horns. He was defeated by Shoto and later arrested by the Otheon police.

Rogone (ロゴーネ, Rogōne)
Voiced by: Yuki Hayashi (Japanese); Jason Douglas (English)

A red-haired member of Humarise. His Quirk Iron Club (アイアンクラブ, Aian Kurabu) enables him to transform into an Oni-like creature, where his arms can transform into spiked clubs. He was defeated by Deku.

Alan Kay (アラン・ケイ, Aran Kei)
Voiced by: Hirofumi Nojima (Japanese); Brent Mukai (English)

A researcher and member of Humarise. While he was forced to join Humarise and develop the Trigger Bombs, he escaped from the organization to get the deactivation key created by his colleague Eddie Soul, at the cost of his life, to the right people, to stop the cult's genocidal plan to eradicate Quirk users around the world.

=== Villain Factory ===
The Villain Factory (ヴィランファクトリー, Viran Fakutorī) is a separate villain group in My Hero Academia: Vigilantes created by All For One. It is responsible for distributing Quirk-enhancing drugs and turning innocent victims into Instant Villains.

Number 6 (No. 6, Nanbā Shikkusu) / Rokuro Nomura (野村六郎, Nomura Rokurō) / Scarred Man (傷顔の男, Kizugao no Otoko)
Voiced by: Taku Yashiro (Japanese); Aaron Campbell (English)

The main antagonist of the prequel manga series My Hero Academia: Vigilantes and a member of the Villain Factory. All For One bestowed upon him the Quirks Overlock, Self-Detonation, Radio Waves, Regeneration, and Bombify. Number 6 is responsible for a number of actions that occurred throughout the series, including turning Kazuho Haneyama into the second Queen Bee after she politely rejected his advances, causing him to develop a rivalry with the Crawler. In the finale, he blows himself up in a fit of rage, having been unable to kill his rival.^{[VGLS ch. 123]}

=== Other villains ===
The following villains are not associated with any of the villain groups above:

Chizome Akaguro (赤黒 血染, Akaguro Chizome) / Stain (ステイン, Sutein)
Voiced by: Go Inoue (Japanese); Robert McCollum (English)

A former hero trainee who became disillusioned with the hero system after seeing how many became heroes for money and fame, and following his brief career as a vigilante known as Stendhal (スタンダール, Sutandāru), as seen in the Vigilantes spin-off series prior to his defeat by Knuckleduster,^{[VGLS ch. 8–11]} turned into a serial killer with the mission of purging society of both villains and "fake" heroes. His Quirk is Bloodcurdle (凝血, Gyōketsu), which allows him to paralyze a person for a certain period of time by ingesting their blood. Izuku and Shoto defeated him, and he was later imprisoned in Tartarus.^{[ch. 56]} In the aftermath of the Paranormal Liberation War, Stain escaped during All For One's Nomu attack on the prison with a data disk containing Tartarus' security records.^{[ch. 328]}^{[ep 128]} Stain presented the disk to All Might a month later helping the former hero realize his legacy he had with others.^{[ch. 326]} He later assists All Might in his battle against All For One, resulting in All For One killing him, and stealing his Quirk.^{[ch. 401]}

Danjuro Tobita (飛田 弾柔郎, Tobita Danjūrō) / Gentle Criminal (ジェントル・クリミナル, Jentoru Kuriminaru)
Voiced by: Koichi Yamadera (Japanese); John Gremillion (English)

A villain who commits crimes for fame through posting video recordings of his criminal acts. His Quirk Elasticity (反発力/伸び縮み/伸縮性/屈伸/軟性/伸度/柔軟性/弾力/伸縮/弾性, Hanpatsu-ryoku/Nobichidjimi/Shēnsuō Xìng/Kusshin/Nansei/Shin-do/Jūnansei/Danryoku/Shinshuku/Dansei) allows him to bestow the property of elasticity to anything he touches. When he was a teenager, Danjuro wanted to be a hero whose name would go down in history and be in the textbooks, and so he enrolled in an unnamed high school with a Hero course. However, his grades were terrible, he was repeating years at a high school that was not highly regarded, and he failed the Provisional Hero License Exam four times. His dream of becoming a hero came to an end after he was expelled from school for interfering with a Pro-Hero's work, received a strike from the Police Force, was disowned by his parents as a result of a lawsuit filed by the family of the injured window washer that put them in deep debt, and saw his old classmate Takeshita becoming a successful Pro Hero while not remembering Danjuro. Danjuro has little-to-no interest in money or other objects of value. Instead, he chases after fame, which he tries to achieve through video recordings of his criminal acts.^{[ch. 171]} He and La Brava are defeated by Deku and handed over to the police, where Gentle Criminal is interrogated by Gori and where Danjuro lies to save La Brava from being punished with him.^{[ch. 181–183]} Following the events of the Paranormal Liberation War, during All For One's prison breakouts, a reformed Danjuro helps stop several of the prisoners from his prison from escaping, and joins the heroes' side in the Final War.^{[ch. 377-378]} Following the war, Denjuro is officially released from prison as a reward for his services and reunites with La Brava.^{[ch. 426]}

Manami Aiba (相場 愛美, Aiba Manami) / La Brava (ラブラバ, Ra Buraba)
Voiced by: Yui Horie (Japanese); Megan Shipman (English)

La Brava is Gentle's loyal admirer, who films and posts videos of his criminal activities online. Her Quirk Love (恋心/想い/思い/愛着/愛好/恋愛/愛情/恋/好き/愛/ラブ, Koigokoro/Omoi/Omoi/Aichaku/Aikō/Ren'ai/Aijō/Koi/Suki/Ai/Rabu) allows her to boost the power of whomever she loves the most by declaring her love to them (although she is only able to activate her Quirk once a day). In her younger days, La Brava became sensitive to rejection after her lover rejected her love letter; and she fell into a deep depression where she became a withdrawn shut-in who had no aspirations, spending every day glued to her computer, and even contemplating suicide. However, her hope and energy was restored after seeing Danjuro's videos, and she wanted to accompany him and help even if doing so made her a criminal as well.^{[ch. 178]} She and Gentle are defeated by Deku and handed over to the police, where La Brava was interrogated by two detectives.^{[ch. 181–183]} She later joins the heroes' side during the Final War.^{[ch. 378]}

Ending (エンディング, Endingu)
Voiced by: Kishō Taniyama (Japanese); Belsheber Rusape Jr. (English)

A masked villain who attacks Endeavor while he is interning Midoriya, Bakugo, and Todoroki. His Quirk Whiteline (白線/ホワイトライン, Hakusen/Howaito Rain) allows him to control and manipulate any lane lines that are painted on the road. Ending is mentally ill and noticeably infatuated with Endeavor. He is completely suicidal whilst disregarding of other peoples' lives if it serves to provoke Endeavor into killing him. He is defeated by the Endeavor Agency trainees and later arrested by the police.^{[ch. 252]}

Kaina Tsutsumi (筒美 火伊那, Tsutsumi Kaina) / Lady Nagant (レディ・ナガン, Redi Nagan)
Voiced by: Atsumi Tanezaki (Japanese); Erica Lindbeck (English)

A former hero who worked as an assassin for the Public Safety Commission, killing both villains and corrupt heroes. Her Quirk Rifle (小銃/ライフル, Shōjū/Raifuru) grants her the ability to transform her right forearm into a rifle at will. She uses her hair to create ammunition. Kaina is a serious and disciplined woman, who does not hesitate to hurt people to fulfill her mission. She can be very casual and rather fearless, showing no visible fear upon meeting All For One and even addressing him in a familiar way. Disillusioned with the hero society, she attacks the Public Safety president, causing her to be sent to Tartarus. During the Tartarus Break-in, she escaped, helping Kai Chisaki in the process. She then was sent by All for One to capture Izuku Midoriya, receiving an Air Walk Quirk as payment.^{[ch. 312]} Kaina was defeated by Izuku. All For One triggered a Quirk-infused bomb for her failure, which exploded her, but she managed to survive.^{[ch. 316]} Albeit still recovering from her injuries, a reformed Kaina rejoins the heroes' side during the Final War.^{[ch. 378]} In the epilogue, Kaina decides to stay in Tartarus for a shorter while despite being offered a pardon from Hawks, since she still has not regained her trust in the hero society, but still puts her faith in Izuku since she believes he would show the best in the hero society.^{[ch. 426]}

Wolfram (ウォルフラム, Worufuramu)
Voiced by: Rikiya Koyama (Japanese); Keith Silverstein (English)

Wolfram is the main antagonist of My Hero Academia: Two Heroes who was an old acquaintance of All For One and the boss of Swordkill, Daigo, and Nobu. His Quirk Metal Manipulation (金属操作/の加工, Kinzoku Sōsa/no Kakō) enables him to reshape and manipulate all types of metal. All For One also gave Wolfram the Quirk Muscle Augmentation (筋肉増強, Kin'niku Zōkyō), which enables Wolfram to increase his muscle mass. Wolfram and his group attacked I-Island where the I-Expo was being held. He was defeated by Izuku and All Might.

=== Wolfram's Minions ===
The following below are the three minions of Wolfram:

Swordkil (ソキル, Sokiru)
Voiced by: Adam Gibbs

A minion of Wolfram who has an unnamed Quirk that enables him to cover his forearms with cone-shaped blades that can collapse. He was defeated by Izuku.

Daigo (大悟, Daigo)
Voiced by: Daigo (Japanese); Nazeeh Tarsha (English)

An obese minion of Wolfram whose unnamed Quirk enables him to transform into a purple gorilla-like beast. He was defeated by Bakugo.

Nobu (ノブ, Nobu)
Voiced by: Nobu (Japanese); Ben Bryant (English)

A mantis-like minion of Wolfram whose unnamed Quirk enables him to enlarge his hands and displace anything they touch. He was defeated by Bakugo and Todoroki.

Nine (ナイン, Nain)
Voiced by: Yoshino Inoue (Japanese); Johnny Yong Bosch (English)

The main antagonist of My Hero Academia: Heroes Rising and the boss of Chimera, Mummy, and Slice, seeking to create a new world order where those with strong Quirks rule over the weak. While his Quirk Weather Manipulation (気象/天候操作, Kishō/Tenkō Sōsa) allows him to control the weather, its use gradually causes cellular damage. Nine sought out Dr. Kyudai Garaki to modify his body, receiving a copy of All For One's Quirk in the process. The operation only worsened Nine's condition, forcing him to wear a special life-support system that pumps special drugs in him. He proceeds to track down someone with a Quirk that can repair his body. This leads him to target the Shimano family, only to be defeated by Deku and a One For All-powered Bakugo before being killed by Tomura.

=== Nine's Minions ===
The following below are the three minions of Nine:

Chojuro Kon (今鳥獣郎, Kon Chojuro) / Chimera (キメラ, Kimera)
Voiced by: Shunsuke Takeuchi (Japanese); Greg Dulcie (English)

An animalistic minion of Nine with the head of a wolf, hands that are similar to the talons of an eagle, and the tail of a crocodile. His Quirk Chimera (キメラ, Kimera) enables him to have the characteristics of any animal.

Hoyo Makihara (巻原包傭, Makihara Hōyō) / Mummy (マミー, Mamī)
Voiced by: Kōsuke Toriumi (Japanese); Brendan Blaber (English)

A mummy-like minion of Nine whose body is wrapped in burgundy-colored bandages. His Quirk Mummification (木乃伊化/ミイラ化, Kino Ika/Mīra-ka) enables him to ensnare anyone with the bandages.

Kiruka Hasaki (羽咲斬香, Hasaki Kiruka) / Slice (スライス, Suraisu)
Voiced by: Mio Imada (Japanese); Lydia Mackay (English)

A female minion of Nine. Her Quirk Slice (剪む/切る/ひと切れ/切身/切り身/一片/切れ/スライス, Hasamu/Kiru/Hito-gire/Kirimi/Ippen/Kire/Suraisu) enables her to harden and sharpen her hair.

== Other Hero Schools ==
=== Shiketsu High School ===
The primary rival of U.A. High School, Shiketsu High School (士傑 高校, Shiketsu Kōkō) is regarded as the top hero school in West Japan. Shiketsu has very strict regulations compared to those of U.A. and has a more militaristic environment. During the Dark Hero Arc, it is revealed that Shiketsu allied itself with U.A. to help provide security; and it also established a protocol in light of the events caused by Himiko Toga.

Inasa Yoarashi (夜嵐 イナサ, Yoarashi Inasa) / Gale Force (レップウ, Reppu)
Voiced by: Ryota Iwasaki (Japanese); Matt Shipman (English)

A first-year student whose Quirk Whirlwind (旋風, Senpū) allows him to control the wind. He was the top-recommended student for U.A. High School but he withdrew his application.^{[ch. 102]} Inasa is a hyperactive and enthusiastic young man who expresses himself with vigor. He is loud and can come off as obnoxious, but he is oddly polite and speaks very formally most of the time. Inasa claims that there is almost nothing that he dislikes, and growing up as a kid he enjoyed everything, even bugs.^{[ch. 112]} He has a habit of approaching strangers to try and make friends with them. Sometimes, he becomes so excited that he will start talking emphatically about being passionate, and the person or people he is talking to tends to get confused. He developed a rivalry with Todoroki, at first, which arose from a moment in his childhood where Endeavor denied him an autograph. However, he is shown to have apologized to Shoto after the Provisional Hero License Exam, despite admitting that he still hated him. Inasa was truly sincere, showing that his hatred of Shoto had at least diminished. In the Remedial Course Arc, the relationship between the two appears to have improved quite a bit, although their differing personalities and tastes still clash every so often.

Camie Utsushimi (現見 ケミィ, Utsushimi Kemii) / Maboromicamie (マボロミカミィ, Maboromikamii)
Voiced by: Minori Chihara (Japanese); Brittney Karbowski (English)

A second-year student whose Quirk Glamour (蠱惑/哀れ/優れ/色気/魅力/幻惑/グラマー, Kowaku/Aware/Sugure/Iroke/Miryoku/Genwaku/Guramā) allows her to create illusions that form from a mist-like substance that she emits from her mouth. Camie is perceived as less serious than most of her Shiketsu peers, easily brushing off that she has been targeted by the League of Villains who impersonated her to infiltrate the Provisional Hero License Exam. Seiji Shishikura believes that she is an utter fool, but their teacher describes her as simply being bubbly. She is very laid back, straightforward, and tends to be quite talkative.^{[ch. 164]} While she appears to be naïve to a fault, in hindsight Camie is seen as rather clever. During the remedial course, she came up with the idea of the remedial students using their Quirks to impress the children rather than fighting violence with violence. She is also truthful and to a point, insightful, telling Katsuki Bakugo that he does well when putting his loud and aggressive attitude aside.

Seiji Shishikura (肉倉 精児, Shishikura Seiji) / Sisicross (シシクロス, Shishikurosu)
Voiced by: Makoto Furukawa (Japanese); Stephen Fu (English)

A second-year student whose Quirk Meatball (精肉/ミートボール, Seiniku/Mītobōru) allows him to mold others into restrained globs of flesh. Seiji is a proud and dignified individual who values Shiketsu's teachings about obligation and dignity above all else. He often stands with his arms behind his back and is eloquent when speaking, which causes people to refer to him as "Senpai". He has a lot of respect for U.A. High School, but he believes that the students of Class 1-A sully its reputation because they lack dignity. He dislikes Katsuki Bakugo especially and lectured him several times during their fight about how Katsuki needs to reflect on how his actions reflect on U.A. High. He agrees with Stain's denouncement of corruption in the heroics industry, but refuses to acknowledge sharing sentiments with a serial killer.^{[ch. 110]} His father was a respected warden at Tartarus, with the similarity of Shiketsu's mariner's caps to his father's workplace being a deciding factor in Seiji's attendance;^{[GB p. 144-145]} after his father was killed by All For One in the prison break from Tartarus, Seiji harbored a desire to kill the villain and avenge his father, but refused to act on it out of his duty to protect civilians.^{[ch. 384]}

Nagamasa Mora (毛原 長昌, Mōra Nagamasa) / Chewyee (チューイー, Chūī)
Voiced by: Volcano Ōta (Japanese); Randy E. Aguebor (ep. 56), Jim Johnson (eps. 57; 59–60) (English)

A second-year student and class representative from Shiketsu High whose Quirk Extend-o-Hair (髪を伸ばす/伸毛, Kami o Nobasu/Shinmō) allows him to lengthen and manipulate his body hair. Unlike Inasa Yoarashi and Seiji Shishikura, Nagamasa is far more polite and reasonable and is willing to build a good relationship with Class 1-A. As a class representative, he has strict standards and will rebuke his classmates for reckless behavior. He values Shiketsu's reputation greatly and will not tolerate others debasing it. His appearance and hero name is an homage to the Star Wars character Chewbacca.

=== Ketsubutsu Academy ===
Ketsubutsu Academy (傑物 学園高校, Ketsubutsu Gakuen Kōkō) is a high-ranking hero academy that claims a rivalry with U.A. High School, although it is much more one-sided than the rivalry between Shiketsu and U.A. High. Ms. Joke is the school's teacher, making it the only other school to have a member of its teaching staff named.

Yo Shindo (真堂揺, Shindō Yō) / Grand (グランド, Gurand)
Voiced by: Yuuta Kasuya (Japanese); Bryce Papenbrook (English)

A third-year^{[ch. 307]} student at Ketsubutsu Academy whose Quirk Vibrate (振動する/震う/揺らす, Shindō Suru/Furuu/Yurasu) allows him to channel powerful vibrations through any surface he touches with his hands. The Shindo in Shindo Suru is a reference to his last name. At first glance, Yo appears to be a polite and friendly individual. He gives others the benefit of the doubt and believes they have pure hearts. However, this is a facade to get others to lower their guard. Preferring to be tactful, he is a natural leader and a talented strategist who can remain calm and rational in chaotic situations. Although he is very competitive, he appears to respect the effort put forth by his competitors. Even so, he is not afraid to exploit their weaknesses. During the Dark Hero Arc, Yo was pinned down by Muscular and is seemingly about to be killed, until he is rescued by the masked figure who is none other than Izuku Midoriya. The former regains consciousness, thinks about how the masked figure looks like a kid that he met at the Provisional Hero License Exam, and wonders if they are the same person.^{[ch. 309]}

Tatami Nakagame (中瓶 畳, Nakagame Tatami) / Turtle Neck (タートルネック, Tātorunekku)
Voiced by: Megumi Han (Japanese); Kristen McGuire (English)

A third-year student at Ketsubutsu Academy who is a fan of U.A. Her Quirk Telescopic (伸縮式/折りたたみ, Shinshuku-shiki/Oritatami) allows her to retract parts of her body, like a turtle. Described as a cheerful and sociable person, Tatami follows Class 1-A and was not ashamed of asking her rival students for an autograph. She appears to show affection for her own classmates and works for them. However, during the Dark Hero Arc, she can be fault-finding, a trait that is seen after Yo Shindo fails at persuading a group of civilians to evacuate to a safe area.^{[ch. 308]}

Shikkui Makabe (真壁 漆喰, Makabe Shikkui) / Mr. Smith (Mr. スミス, Misutā Sumisu)
Voiced by: Hiromichi Kogami (Japanese); Brad Hawkins (English)

A third-year student at Ketsubutsu Academy with an odd appearance due to his blue rock-like skin. His Quirk Stiffening (硬直する/勃起/引き締める/凝る/痼る/硬化する/硬質化, Kōchoku Suru/Bokki/Hikishimeru/Shikoriru/Koru/Kōka Suru/Kōshitsu-ka) allows him to make any object he rubs with his hands extremely hard, although it does not work on living beings. Like his classmates, Shikkui works hard to become a hero and believes in the strength of his class.

Itejiro Toteki (投擲 射手次郎, Tōteki Itejirō) / Boomerang Man (ブーメランマン, Būmeran Man)
Voiced by: Kenta Ōkuma (Japanese); Lee George (English)
A student whose Quirk Boomerang (跳ね返る/ブーメラン, Hanekaeru/Būmeran) grants him the ability to throw objects with incredible accuracy and change their trajectory in mid-air. Despite his shy personality, Itejiro is confident of his own abilities and tries to imbue his performances with gracefulness.

=== Seiai Academy ===
Seiai Academy (聖愛 学院, Seiai Gakuen) is an all-girls hero academy that is exclusive to the anime.

Saiko Intelli (印照 才子, Interi Saiko)
Voiced by: Reina Ueda (Japanese); Jeannie Tirado (English)

A second-year student at Seiai Academy, Saiko Intelli is exclusive to the anime and does not appear in the manga. Her Quirk, IQ (アイキュー, Ai Kyū), allows her to temporarily boost her intelligence by drinking tea and closing her eyes. The strength of the intelligence boost depends on the type of tea she drinks. Although Saiko is intelligent, it has been shown that she was not able to predict or comprehend emotion-driven actions (EQ) as shown when she questioned why Tsuyu, Mezo, and Kyoka had come back to rescue Momo, when it would likely have been that their friend had already been eliminated; they should have been worrying about themselves instead.

=== Isamu Academy High School ===
Isamu Academy High School (勇 学園 高校, Isamu Gakuen Kōkō) is a hero academy that is exclusive to the anime, featured in the OVA Training of the Dead.

Romero Fujimi (藤見 露召呂, Fujimi Romero)
Voiced by: Ryōhei Kimura

An arrogant student whose Quirk Zombie Virus (ゾンビ ウィルス, Zonbi Wirusu) enables him to create a gas that temporarily turns those who inhale it into zombies. However, he is not immune to his own Quirk. Similar to Katsuki Bakugo, Romero was shown to be gruff and unkind, while also being arrogant and reckless. Like many of the other students, he idolizes All Might. He has a condescending manner and appears to look down on Class 1-A, as he tells his peers to not be friendly with them.

Kashiko Sekigai (赤外 可視子, Sekigai Kashiko) / Sensor Girl (センサーガール, Sensāgāru)
Voiced by: Asami Yoshikawa

A class representative from Isamu Academy. Her unnamed Quirk allows her to create a holographic page which can be used to locate and detect people. Kashiko shares her personality with Momo Yaoyorozu, as she is also very responsible and has great leadership skills.

Dadan Tadan (多弾 打弾, Tadan Dadan) / Lucky Strike (ラッキーストライク, Rakkīsutoraiku)
Voiced by: Kei Minegishi

A timid boy whose unnamed Quirk enables his sweat to create a bright flash of light and sound on impact.

Habuko Mongoose (万偶数 羽生子, Mangūsu Habuko)
Voiced by: Maaya Uchida

A friend of Tsuyu Asui from their middle school days who sports the head and neck of a snake. Her unnamed Quirk allows her to paralyze her targets for three seconds by looking them straight in the eye. She also appears in the first bonus chapter of the manga.

== Other characters ==
=== Civilians ===
Inko Midoriya (緑谷 引子, Midoriya Inko)
Voiced by: Aya Kawakami (Japanese); Jessica Cavanagh (English)

Izuku's mother. Initially supportive of her son's dreams, the constant villain attacks on U.A. make her briefly doubt the safety of the school. Her unnamed Quirk allows her to draw small objects to her with telekinesis-like power.

Kota Izumi (出水 洸汰, Izumi Kōta)
Voiced by: Michiru Yamazaki, Aoi Ichikawa (teen) (Japanese); Cassandra Lee Morris, Yussef Benelbar (teen) (English)

A young boy who lost his Hero parents, the Water Hose duo, to Muscular and was taken in by the Pussycats due to Mandalay being his aunt. His Quirk Water Gun (水鉄砲, Mizudeppō) allows him to release water from his hands.

Taneo Tokuda (特田 種男, Tokuda Taneo)
Voiced by: Eiji Hanawa (Japanese); Jay Hickman, Monica Rial (young) (English)

Exclusive to the anime, Taneo Tokuda is a freelance journalist who sought out All Might's successor for personal reasons. His Quirk Whole-Body Lens (全身レンズ, Zenshin Renzu) allows him to manifest camera lenses on any part of his body and print the photographs from his chest.

Eri (エリ)
Voiced by: Seiran Kobayashi (Japanese); Emily Neves (English)

The young granddaughter of the Shie Hassaikai's former crime boss. She was abused and experimented on by Overhaul to create the Quirk-destroying drug that he planned to use to bring the Yakuza back to power. She developed a deep fear of him in consequence. After she is saved by Deku and Lemillion, she is taken in by the teachers at U.A. and eventually adjusts to normal life, becoming a much more cheerful and optimistic child as a result. Her Quirk Rewind (巻き戻す/巻き戻し/リワインド, Maki Modosu/Maki Modoshi/Riwaindo) enables her to revert a living individual's body back to a previous state, allowing her to make them younger, heal injuries, and undo any bodily modifications.

Rei Todoroki (轟 冷, Todoroki Rei)
Voiced by: Michiko Neya (Japanese); Morgan Garrett (English)

Endeavor's wife and the mother of their four children. She has a powerful ice Quirk that has yet to be shown in-series. Born as Rei Himura (氷叢 冷, Himura Rei), she was essentially sold off to Endeavor by her family for unknown reasons and decided to sire more than one child with him so the children could encourage each other. Although their relationship was actually quite healthy during the early years of their marriage, it started to sour when Endeavor lost himself in his obsession to surpass All Might. The abuse he put her through also caused Rei to become mentally unstable, and she finally threw boiling water on the left side of Shoto's face in a fit of madness, prompting an unsympathetic Endeavor to send her to a mental hospital. Currently, Rei still resides in that same hospital, but she has recovered her sanity and returned to her normal self. Rei also maintains loving relationships with her children and has come to look past her husband's faults as she is aware of his attempts to face his past and atone for his mistakes. Rei was among those who found out that Dabi was her long-lost son Toya. She is later released from the hospital where she was reunited with her children to confront her husband about being responsible for Dabi's upbringing.

Fuyumi Todoroki (轟 冬美, Todoroki Fuyumi)
Voiced by: Kei Shindo (Japanese); Kate Oxley (English)

Shoto's older sister. She works as an elementary school teacher and has an ice Quirk like her mother. As noted by Bakugo, she is also an excellent chef. Out of all of Enji's children, she is the only one who has forgiven her father for his mistakes and supports his attempts to atone and mend his relationships with his family. Fuyumi was among those in the Todoroki family who learned that Dabi is her long-lost brother Toya.

Natsuo Todoroki (轟 夏雄, Todoroki Natsu)
Voiced by: Yuuki Shin (Japanese); Adam Gibbs, Kimmie Britt (young) (English)

Shoto's older brother. He is a university student majoring in medicine and has an ice Quirk like his mother. Unlike his sister, Natsuo openly resents his father for his abuse toward his mother and causing Toya's apparent death; he has a hard time even talking to him without losing his composure even when Endeavor saved him from Ending. Natsuo was among those in the Todoroki family to learned that Dabi is his long-lost brother Toya and was gravely shocked by this revelation. While holding his father accountable for Toya's descent into villainy, Natsuo blames himself for not speaking against his father from the start, which might have prevented Toya from becoming a villain. In the finale, Natsuo realizes he can never truly forgive his father and decides to disown him, and start his own family with his girlfriend to whom he is now engaged to, something that Enji understands.^{[ch. 426]}

Hiroshi Tameda (為田 浩, Tameda Hiroshi)
Voiced by: Serina Machiyama (Japanese); Todd Haberkorn (English)

Endeavor's loyal fan. He is a plain-looking young man who looks somewhat similar to Kosei Tsuburaba. Hiroshi is rather supportive of Endeavor, notably when he spoke out to say that the public still need to believe in Endeavor for his protecting society from powerful villains such as High-End.

David Shield (デヴィット・シールド, Devitto Shīrudo)
Voiced by: Katsuhisa Namase, Ryohei Kimura (young) (Japanese); Ray Chase (English)

Appearing in My Hero Academia: Two Heroes, David Shield is a scientist at I-Island; he is All Might's old friend and the father of Melissa Shield.

Melissa Shield (メリッサ・シールド, Merissa Shīrudo)
Voiced by: Mirai Shida (Japanese); Erica Mendez (English)

Appearing in My Hero Academia: Two Heroes, Melissa is the Quirkless daughter of David Shield; she bonds with Izuku.

Katsuma Shimano (島乃 活真, Shimano Katsuma)
Voiced by: Yuka Terasaki (Japanese); Maxey Whitehead (English)

A little boy living on Nabu Island who befriends Deku and the students. His Quirk Cell Activation (細胞の活性化, Saibō no Kassei-ka) allows its user to activate the cells in anyone's body through touch, which increases regeneration and improves their physical condition. Katsuma's Quirk is sought out by Nine in the movie My Hero Academia: Heroes Rising. Unlike his sister Mahoro, he has an admiration of Heroes and openly wears an enamel pin of Edgeshot on the front of his satchel, along with dreaming of growing up to become a hero himself one day.

Mahoro Shimano (島乃 真幌, Shimano Mahoro)
Voiced by: Tomoyo Kurosawa (Japanese); Dani Chambers (English)
A little girl living on Nabu Island who is Katsuma's older sister. Her Quirk Hologram (ホログラム, Horoguramu) allows her to create holograms of anything she wishes. She is a character in the movie My Hero Academia: Heroes Rising. Mahoro is a stubborn girl who is quick to judge others. She believes that the heroes are not as great as they appear to be. However, after she and her brother are rescued by Izuku, she begins to acknowledge the heroes' greatness.
Rody Soul (ロディ ソウル, Rodi Sōru)
Voiced by: Ryo Yoshizawa, Asisa Sekine (young) (Japanese); Ryan Colt Levy, Cristina Vee (young) (English)

A character introduced in My Hero Academia: World Heroes' Mission. His Quirk Soul (清祥/魂胆/亡魂/人影/精/気骨/魂魄/精霊/気迫/真髄/霊/霊魂/精神/魂/ソウル, Seishō/Kontan/Bōkon/Hitokage/Sei/Kikotsu/Konpaku/Seirei/Kihaku/Shinzui/Rei/Reikon/Seishin/Tamashī/Sōru) manifests as a small, pink, bird-like creature named Pino (ピノ), which changes facial expressions based on how Rody is feeling, due to a link to his soul. Rody is also a resident of Otheon.

Pino (ピノ)
Voiced by: Megumi Hayashibara (Japanese); Cristina Vee (English)

A small, pink bird-like creature who changes facial expressions based on how Rody is feeling due to a link to his soul. Pino is Rody's quirk.

Giulio Gandini (ジュリオ・ガンディーニ, Jurio Gandīni)
Voiced by: Mamoru Miyano (Japanese); Mauricio Ortiz-Segura (English)

A character introduced in My Hero Academia: You're Next. Giulio is the butler who serves the wealthy Scervino family. His Quirk Neutralization (中和/因子相殺, Chūwa/Inshi Sōsai) allows him to temporarily nullify a target's Quirk by touching them, which is activated from the right arm of the user. Due to the Scervino's Mansion falling debris after an invasion, he loses some limbs and replaces them with engineered parts. These parts are: (continue because I forgot)

Anna Scervino (アンナ・シェルビーノ, Anna Sheruvīno)
Voiced by: Meru Nukumi (Japanese); Kayli Mills (English)

A character introduced in My Hero Academia: You're Next. Anna is a daughter of the Scervino family. Her Quirk Overmodification (過剰変容/改造, Kajō Henyō/Kaizō) allows her to modify the Quirk of anyone who is touching her. Each use of her Quirk causes her hair to turn from peach-colored to black, and it only works on people who are compatible. After being brainwashed by Deborah and getting rescued, she decided to stay with Giulio.

=== Police Force ===
The Police Force is responsible for working alongside the Pro-Heroes, conducting investigations, and arresting the defeated villains.

Kenji Tsuagamae (面構犬嗣, Tsuragamae Kenji)
Voiced by: Ryōta Takeuchi (Japanese); Chris Guerrero (English)

The chief of police whose unnamed Quirk gives him the head of a beagle.^{[ch. 56]}

Naomasa Tsukauchi (塚内 直正, Tsukauchi Naomasa) / True Man (トゥルーマン, Turūman)
Voiced by: Tokuyoshi Kawashima (Japanese); Alejandro Saab (English)

Tsukauchi is a detective who is All Might's client on the Police Force, and therefore knows of his and Izuku's Quirk. He is also a recurring character in the prequel series My Hero Academia: Vigilantes,^{[VGLS ch. 3]} where it is revealed that he is the older brother of Makoto Tsukauchi who is Captain Celebrity's business manager, though their differing views towards the Naruhata Vigilantes had created tension between them.

Sansa Tamakawa (玉川さんさ, Tamagawa Sansa)
Voiced by: Ryu Inui (Japanese); Zach Bolton (English)

A member of the Police Force whose unnamed Quirk gives him the head of a tabby cat.^{[ch. 21]}

Gori (ゴリ, Gori)

A member of the Police Force whose unnamed Quirk gives him the head of a mountain gorilla. He was the one who interrogated Gentle Criminal.^{[ch. 183]} During the Final War Arc, Gori was outside Dr. Kyudai's cell when the latter tells Gori about how All For One first met Dabi.^{[ch. 350]} Gori's name was revealed in My Hero Academia: Ultra Analysis: The Official Character Guide.

=== Past Users of One for All ===
All of the past users of One for All (to the extent their names are known) had names corresponding to their order of ownership of the power. Some are literal inclusions of the number: such as in Shigaraki Yoichi's case, "Ichi" being literally "one"; and in All Might's case, his real last name "Yagi" containing the word "eight". Some are more nuanced or a matter of word-play: such as in Shimura Nana's case, where although the word "seven" is not written out, the Japanese pronunciation of "seven" is "nana"; in Banjo Daigoro's case, where although his "go" is a different word from "five", it sounds the same and contains the word "five"; in Izuku's case, the word "ku" is a word play on "nine". The sixth user's name is an exception, but "En" does not appear to be a real name.

Yoichi Shigaraki (死柄木 与一, Shigaraki Yoichi)
Voiced by: Sōichirō Hoshi (Japanese); Stephen Fu (English)

The first user of One For All and sickly younger twin brother of All For One. He was initially believed to have been born Quirkless, but in reality he once had a Quirk called Quirk Bestowal, which had no other ability than to transfer itself to another person through their DNA. After his brother forcibly gave Yoichi a power-stockpiling Quirk, it merged with the Quirk that he already had, resulting in the creation of One For All. "Ichi", in "Yoichi", means "one".

Toshitsugu Kudo (駆藤 敏次, Kudō Toshitsugu)
Voiced by: Daisuke Ono (Japanese); Ben Balmaceda (English)

The second user of One For All and the leader of a resistance who fought against All For One. His Quirk was Gearshift (変速/ギアシフト, Hensoku/Giashifuto), which allows him to change the speed of anything it touches, that accelerates through space, while ignoring the laws of inertia.

Bruce Lee (ブルース・リー, Burūsu Rī)
Voiced by: Ryōta Suzuki (Japanese); Nazeeh Tarsha (English)

The third user of One For All and a member of Kudo's resistance. His Quirk was Fa Jin (発勁/ファジン, Hakkei/Fajin), which allows him to store kinetic energy inside his body, by repetitive movements, for later use. When the user chooses to release the energy, they unleash an explosive burst of speed and power.

Hikage Shinomori (四乃森 避影, Shinomori Hikage)
Voiced by: Toshiyuki Morikawa (Japanese); Bradley Gareth (English)

The fourth user of One For All, he was a white-haired man with a long scar running down the left side of his face. Unlike the users before him, he opted to hide from All For One and train with One For All to make the Quirk as strong as possible. He died 18 years after inheriting One For All as a result of his body being unable to withstand the stress of using multiple Quirks for long periods of time. His Quirk was Danger Sense (危機/険感知/察知, Kiki/en Kanchi/Satchi) which allowed him to detect any potential threats in his surroundings. "Shi" in "Shinomori" means "four".

Daigoro Banjo (萬繩 大悟郎, Banjō Daigorō) / Lariat (ラリアット, Rariatto)
Voiced by: Hiroki Yasumoto (Japanese); Andrew Love (English)

The fifth user of One For All, he was a muscular, bald man with an energetic personality. During the time that he possessed One For All, All For One attempted to steal it from him twice, but failed at both attempts. His Quirk was Blackwhip (黒鞭/ブラックウィップ, Kuro Muchi/Burakkuwippu) which enabled him to create tendrils of black energy from his hands that he could use to capture enemies as well as increase his mobility. He first appeared during the Joint Training Battle as a spirit inside One For All to give Izuku instructions on how to use his Quirk. "Go" in "Daigoro" contains the word "five" (五).

En Tayutai (揺蕩井 煙, Tayutai En) / Smoke-Eater (ガエン, Gaen)
Voiced by: Tetsuya Kakihara (Japanese); Davon Oliver (English)

The sixth user of One For All, he was a quiet, dark-haired man who wore a high-collared jacket that covered his mouth and nose. His Quirk was Smokescreen (煙幕, Enmaku) which enabled him to generate thick clouds of smoke from his body.

Nana Shimura (志村 菜奈, Shimura Nana)
Voiced by: Mie Sonozaki (Japanese); Stephanie Young (English)

The seventh user of One For All and Tenko Shimura's grandmother, she was a beautiful and compassionate woman with a strong sense of justice. She was also All Might's master and died protecting him from All For One when the villain attempted to kill them both. Her Quirk was Float (流す/浮ぶ/漂う/浮き上がる/浮かべる/浮く/屋台/浮き/浮遊/フロート, Nagasu/Ukabu/Tadayou/Ukiagaru/Ukaberu/Uku/Yatai/Uki/Fuyū/Furōto) which allowed her to levitate and fly. "Nana" is the Japanese pronunciation for "seven," although a different Kanji has been chosen for the name.

=== Naruhata Vigilantes ===
Koichi Haimawari (灰廻 航一, Haimawari Kōichi) / The Crawler (ザ・クロウラー, Za Kurourā)
Voiced by: Shūichirō Umeda (Japanese); Jack Broadbent (English)

A 19-year-old college student whose Quirk Slide and Glide (滑走/スライド&グライド, Kassō/Suraido & Guraido) allows him to quickly travel across any flat surface. However, he must make contact with the surface in at least three places (typically he chooses both of his hands and one or both of his feet). He became a vigilante after being unable to become a Pro Hero. During the finale following his final battle with Number 6, his friend Captain Celebrity vouches for him by claiming him as a sidekick.^{[VGLS ch. 124, p. 5–6]} Since then, Koichi has moved to America and joined CC's company in New York, under a new codename Skycrawler^{[VGLS ch. 125, p. 16–19]} due to his previous status as a wanted outlaw in Japan, while trying to win over public support.^{[VGLS ch. 126, p. 4–8]}

Kazuho Haneyama (羽根山 和歩, Haneyama Kazuho) / Pop☆Step (ポップ☆ステップ, Poppu☆Suteppu)
Voiced by: Ikumi Hasegawa (Japanese); Macy Anne Johnson (English)

A high school student whose Quirk Leap (刎ね上がる/跳ね起きる/はね上がる/跳ねる/跳ね上がる/跳ぶ/飛躍する/跳躍, Hane Agaru/Hane Okiru/Haneru/Haneagaru/Tobu/Hiyaku Suru/Chōyaku) allows her to jump several meters high. She was briefly possessed by a villain known as Queen Bee, though she is saved from possession after she is shot through the chest, becoming gravely injured.

Iwao Oguro (雄黒 巌, Oguro Iwao) / Knuckleduster (ナックルダスター, Nakkurudasutā)
Voiced by: Yasuhiro Mamiya (Japanese); Jason Marnocha (English)

An old man who is investigating the trafficking of a mysterious drug around town, in order to find his daughter. His tenacity in battle makes others believe he possesses a Quirk related to physical prowess, when he actually has no Quirk at all. He was later revealed to formerly have been the former hero O'Clock whose Quirk Overclock (オーバークロック, Ōbākurokku) had been stolen by All-For-One ^{[VGLS ch. 44, 75]} and had been given to Number 6. In the finale, he continues his work as a lone vigilante in Naruhata.^{[VGLS ch. 126, p. 20–21]}
