= Salad Days (Adrian Belew album) =

Compilation album by Adrian Belew
- Released: February 9, 1999
- Genre: Rock
- Label: Thirsty Ear Recordings
- Producer: Adrian Belew

Adrian Belew chronology
Belew Prints: The Acoustic Adrian Belew, Vol. 2 (1998)	Salad Days (1999)	Coming Attractions (2000)

Professional ratings
Review scores
Source	Rating
AllMusic	4/5 stars

Salad Days is a compilation album by Adrian Belew, originally released on February 9, 1999. It is a collection of acoustic recordings old and new.

The album consists primarily of acoustic reworkings of Belew's own songs along with three King Crimson songs and two sonic collages, the latter being the only tracks exclusive to this album. All other tracks were compiled from the albums The Acoustic Adrian Belew and Belew Prints: The Acoustic Adrian Belew, Vol. 2, or the sessions thereof.

== Reviews ==
CMJ (2/1/99, p. 26)
"...Belew's most penetrating pop songs may exude goofiness, tenderness or both....If Belew's altar wasn't so crowded with guitar geeks, singer-songwriter fans would be lining up to praise the guitarist's equally noteworthy talents with the pen."

== Track listing ==
1. "The Lone Rhinoceros" (Adrian Belew) – 2:36, original version on Lone Rhino
2. "Men in Helicopters" (Belew) – 3:08, original version on Young Lions
3. "The Rail Song" (Belew) – 3:42, original version on Twang Bar King
4. "Everything" (Belew) – 2:55, original version on Inner Revolution
5. "Three of a Perfect Pair" (Belew, Bill Bruford, Robert Fripp, Tony Levin) – 4:08, Recorded live in Argentina 1996, original version on the King Crimson album Three of a Perfect Pair
6. "Return of the Chicken" (Belew) – 1:34
7. "Never Enough" (Belew) – 3:30, original version on Here
8. "The Man in the Moon" (Belew) – 2:11, original version on Lone Rhino
9. "I Remember How to Forget" (Belew) – 3:34, original version on Op Zop Too Wah
10. "Bad Days" (Belew) – 2:55, original version on Mr. Music Head
11. "Fly" (Belew) – 3:54, Recorded live in Argentina 1996, original version on Here
12. "Young Lions" (Belew) – 3:06, original version on Young Lions
13. "Things You Hit with a Stick" (Belew) – 2:05
14. "Cage" (Belew, Bruford, Fripp, Levin, Pat Mastelotto, Trey Gunn) – 2:23, original version on the King Crimson EP Vrooom
15. "Dinosaur" (Belew, Bruford, Fripp, Levin, Mastelotto, Gunn) – 5:43 original version on the King Crimson album Thrak
16. "One of Those Days" (Belew) – 3:01, original version on Mr. Music Head

== Personnel ==
=== Musicians ===
- Adrian Belew – vocals, guitar, additional instrumentation
- Kristin Wilkinson – viola
- John Catchings – cello
- David Davidson, Dave Angell – violins

=== Technical ===
- Adrian Belew – producer
- Ken Latchney – engineer
- Noah Evens – engineer
- Kevin Hodge – mastering
