= Gulf, Mobile and Ohio Railroad =

Former American railroad

Overview
- Headquarters: Mobile, Alabama
- Reporting mark: GMO
- Locale: central United States
- Dates of operation: 1938–1972
- Predecessor: Mobile and Ohio Railroad; Gulf, Mobile and Northern Railroad; Alton Railroad
- Successor: Illinois Central Gulf

Technical
- Track gauge: 4 ft 8 1/2 in (1,435 mm) standard gauge

The Gulf, Mobile and Ohio (reporting mark GMO) was a Class I railroad in the central United States whose primary routes extended from Mobile, Alabama, and New Orleans, Louisiana, to St. Louis and Kansas City, Missouri, as well as Chicago, Illinois. From its two parallel lines through eastern Mississippi, the GM&O also served Montgomery and Birmingham, Alabama, as well as Memphis, Tennessee.

== History ==
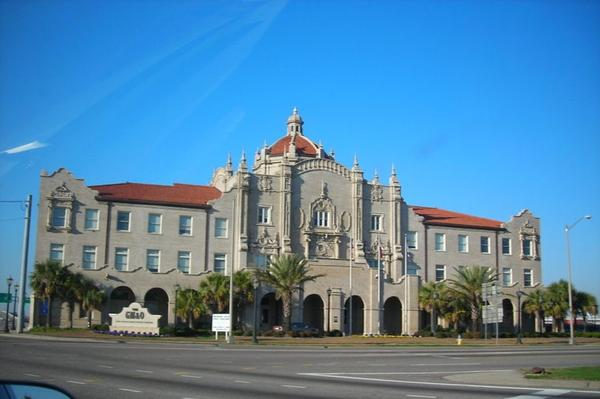
The Gulf, Mobile and Ohio terminal in Mobile, Alabama.

The Gulf, Mobile and Northern Railroad was created as the reorganization of the New Orleans, Mobile and Chicago Railroad in 1917. The GM&O was incorporated in 1938 to merge the Gulf, Mobile and Northern Railroad and the Mobile and Ohio Railroad, which was accomplished in 1940. The GM&O later bought and merged the Alton Railroad in 1947.

Isaac B. Tigrett, a native of Jackson, Tennessee, was president of the GM&N from 1920 and of the GM&O from 1938 to 1952, and oversaw the development of the road from a nearly bankrupt operation into a thriving success. He was the great-uncle of Hard Rock Cafe founder Isaac Tigrett, also a native of Jackson.

In 1945 a branch line inherited from the Mobile and Ohio Railroad from Millstadt Junction to Millstadt, Illinois was sold by the GM&O to form an independent line, the Colombia and Millstadt Railroad.

From 1952 to 1972 the headquarters of the GM&O were in Mobile, Alabama at 104 St. Francis Street. The President of the GM&O Railroad during this period was Glen Porter Brock, Sr. The Railroad retained the passenger terminal at Beauregard Street for additional offices.

At the end of 1944 GM&O operated 1950 miles of road, including NOGN; at the end of 1950 it operated 2898 route-miles. At the end of 1970 route mileage was 2734 (3946 miles of track); GM&O reported 8285 million ton-miles of revenue freight and 44 million passenger-miles for that year.

In 1967, GM&O abandoned its connection from Artesia, Mississippi to Starkville, Mississippi.

The GM&O Railroad was the first "large" railroad in the United States to replace all its steam locomotives with diesels.

On August 10, 1972 the Gulf, Mobile and Ohio Railroad merged into the Illinois Central Railroad, forming the 9600-mile north-south Illinois Central Gulf Railroad. In 1988, the railroad dropped the "Gulf" from its name, reverting its name to the Illinois Central Railroad. In 1996 Illinois Central spun off some of its redundant trackage, including most of the former Gulf, Mobile and Ohio. Most of this trackage was acquired by other railroads.

On February 11, 1998 the Illinois Central was purchased by the Canadian National Railway (CN) with the integration of operations beginning on July 1, 1999.

== Passenger operations ==
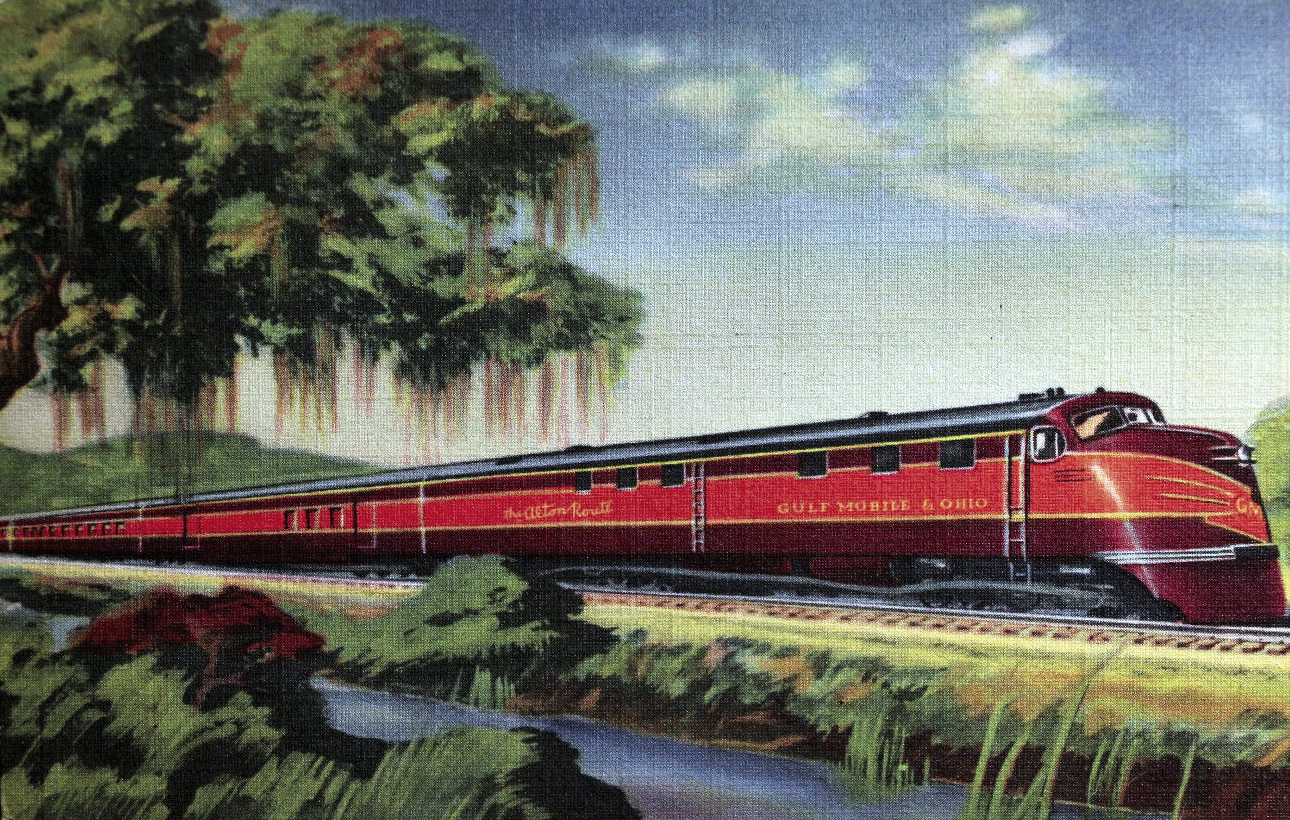
Postcard c. 1940 depicting one of the Rebel streamliners

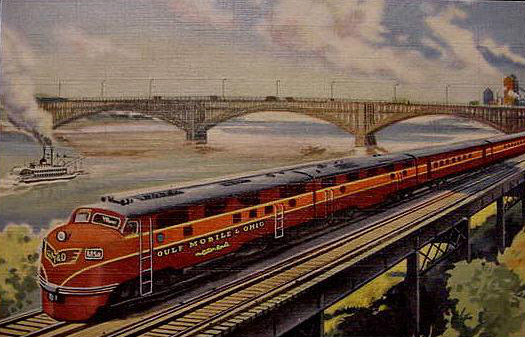
Streamliner circa 1940s between Chicago and St. Louis.

In addition to the GM&O's most popular train, the streamlined Rebel (New Orleans - Jackson, Tennessee 1935-1941; extended to St. Louis thereafter), the railroad also operated other named trains including:

- Alton Limited (later simply The Limited): (Chicago - St. Louis)
- Abraham Lincoln: (Chicago - St. Louis)
- Ann Rutledge: (Chicago - St. Louis) (operated 1937-1947 by the Alton, 1947-1971 by GM&O, 1971-2009 by Amtrak)
- Gulf Coast Rebel: (originally Mobile - Union, Mississippi, later extended to St. Louis)
- The Mail: (Chicago - St. Louis)
- Midnight Special: (Chicago - St. Louis)
- Night Hawk: (St. Louis - Kansas City)
- Prairie State Express: (St. Louis - Chicago)
- Rebel: (St. Louis - New Orleans)

== Preservation ==
- Gulf, Mobile and Ohio caboose #2825 is on display in Kiroli Park in West Monroe, Louisiana.
- Gulf, Mobile and Ohio caboose #2867 is privately owned and on display in Rienzi, Mississippi.
- Gulf, Mobile and Ohio caboose #2951 is on display in downtown Madison, Mississippi.
- Gulf, Mobile and Ohio caboose #2954: re-numbered by ICG as #199044, preserved by the Monticello Railway Museum in Monticello, Illinois.
- Gulf, Mobile and Ohio caboose #2994 is on display at the depot in downtown Corinth, Mississippi.
- Gulf, Mobile and Ohio caboose #2997 is on display at the depot in downtown Booneville, Mississippi.
- Gulf, Mobile and Ohio SD40 #950: the first SD40, currently in Illinois Central marking as #6071, donated to the Monticello Railway Museum in Monticello, Illinois.
- Gulf, Mobile and Ohio GP35 #631 currently owned by the SARM in Oak Ridge, Tennessee. The unit is non-operational and in much disrepair.
- Gulf, Mobile & Ohio parlor-observation #5998 from the 1935 "Abraham Lincoln" train is on display at the Museum of Transportation in St. Louis, Missouri.
- Gulf, Mobile & Ohio EMD AA Boxcab #1200 is currently on display at the Museum of Transportation in St. Louis, Missouri as B&O 50.
- Gulf, Mobile, & Ohio ALCO RS1 #1053 is currently preserved at the Danbury Railroad Museum in Danbury, Connecticut as New Haven #0673.
- Gulf, Mobile and Ohio Pullman "Judge Milton Brown" is on display and used by American Family Radio at the Casey Jones Village in Jackson, Tennessee.
- Gulf, Mobile and Ohio #580, originally Gulf, Mobile and Northern #425, is currently operational at the Blue Mountain and Reading Railroad in Port Clinton, Pennsylvania.
- Gulf, Mobile and Ohio F3 #800A is currently inoperable on display as the Seaboard Air Line #4033 at the Gold Coast Railroad Museum, in Miami, Florida.
- Gulf, Mobile and Ohio Azalea passenger car located in Liberty, New Jersey 1421 US-46 visible on Google Maps.

== In popular culture ==
Sonny Boy Williamson recorded the song GM&O Blues in 1945.

A GM&O EMD E7 and passenger cars were featured in the 1967 film In the Heat of the Night.

In popular music, the GM&O line is referenced in Adrian Belew's "The Rail Song," a nostalgic song about the heyday and subsequent decline of the American railroads. Originally on 1983's Twang Bar King album, the song can also be found on the Desire of the Rhino King compilation and in an acoustic version on both The Acoustic Adrian Belew and the Salad Days compilation.

The album cover of the 1989 Traveling Wilburys song End of the Line features an upside down photograph of the Ann Rutledge at Lincoln, Illinois in 1953.

== See also ==
- Rebels, lightweight streamlined trains, built for GM&O predecessor GM&N by American Car and Foundry
- The only locomotive built by Ingalls Shipbuilding, the Ingalls 4-S, was operated by the GM&O.
