= Live Overseas =

Live album by Adrian Belew
- Released: June 5, 2009
- Label: Adrian Belew Records
- Producer: Adrian Belew

https://dgmlive.com/news/live-overseas

Live Overseas is a live album by Adrian Belew recorded after the release of Side One, Side Two and Side Three.

== Track listing ==
All tracks composed by Adrian Belew; except where noted.

1. "Writing on the Wall"
2. "Dinosaur" (Belew, Bruford, Levin, Fripp, Gunn, Mastelotto)
3. "Ampersand" (4:22)
4. "Young Lions"
5. "Beat Box Guitar"
6. "A Little Madness"
7. "Drive"
8. "Neurotica"*
9. "Of Bow and Drum" (4:48)
10. "Frame by Frame" (Belew, Bruford, Fripp, Levin) (3:06)
11. "Three of a Perfect Pair" (Belew, Bruford, Fripp, Levin) (3:49)
12. "Thela Hun Ginjeet" (Belew, Bruford, Fripp, Levin) (6:19)

== Personnel ==
- Adrian Belew – guitar, vocals
- Julie Slick – bass
- Eric Slick – drums
