= The Bears (band) =

American power pop band

- Also known as: The Psychodots
- Origin: Cincinnati, Ohio, Ohio, US
- Genres: Power pop, indie pop, art rock, avant-garde music
- Years active: 1985–1989; 2001–present
- Labels: Primitive Man Recording Company, Pony Canyon
- Members: Adrian Belew; Chris Arduser; Rob Fetters; Bob Nyswonger

The Bears are an American power pop band formed in 1985 in Cincinnati, Ohio. It features the distinctive avant-garde guitar playing of Adrian Belew, the band's most prominent member.

In addition to guitarist, vocalist and producer Belew, the Bears consists of guitarist/vocalist Rob Fetters, drummer/vocalist Chris Arduser, and bassist Bob Nyswonger.

== Band history ==
Fetters, Nyswonger and Arduser are all former members of the Raisins, a Cincinnati-based band that was a local success in the early 1980s. In 1983, the Raisins, who then consisted of Fetters, Nyswonger, Rick Neiheisel (keyboards, vocals) and Rick "Bam" Powell (drums, vocals), recorded an eponymous album, produced by Belew. Belew's friendship with the Raisins dated back to the mid-70s, when he crossed paths with them as a member of a band named Sweetheart before being discovered by Frank Zappa. The Raisins album, which was released on the small Cincinnati-based label Strugglebaby, produced a local No. 1 hit, "Fear is Never Boring" (later re-recorded for the Bears' first album), on popular Cincinnati radio stations. Clive Davis, then head of Arista Records, considered signing the band, but the Raisins didn't break through nationally.

In 1985, the Raisins broke up. Fetters and Nyswonger joined forces with Belew (who had recently completed a stint with King Crimson) to form a new band, the Bears. The band name was chosen in order to get their albums placed in the alphabetically ordered record store racks next to The Beatles. Arduser, who had left the Raisins years before, was recruited to play drums after Larrie Londin became unavailable for touring. The Bears had some initial trouble getting signed to a major record label, but eventually hooked up with Primitive Man Recording Company (P.M.R.C.), a short-lived subsidiary of I.R.S. Records. The band released two albums, The Bears and Rise And Shine, and embarked on a nearly continuous 3-year period of touring, playing smaller venues across the U.S., with some overseas expeditions. After weathering disappointing album sales, despite warm audience and critical response and a bit of MTV exposure, the Bears broke up after P.M.R.C. closed and Adrian's 1989 solo album Mr. Music Head spawned an MTV hit with "Oh Daddy."

Fetters, Nyswonger and Arduser continued playing together after the Bears disbanded, first re-appropriating the moniker the Raisins, then changing their name to psychodots upon the 1991 release of an eponymous album, released on Strugglebaby. Two more album releases followed in the next few years, but the band was unable to secure a national recording contract, and went on hiatus in 1996. During this time, Belew released solo albums and rejoined King Crimson. Belew's Inner Revolution album from 1992 featured Arduser on drums, and Fetters played in Belew's backing band for the tour supporting its release. On the tour for Belew's 1994 album Here, psychodots served dual roles as the opening band as well as the Belew's backing band, and they played a few Bears songs despite it not being billed as a reunion of the group. Fetters released a solo CD in 1998 on which Belew cowrote two songs, and he, Nyswonger and Arduser all performed on various cuts. Arduser's band the Graveblankets, which also featured Nyswonger, released a series of albums through the late '90s. Arduser and Nyswonger also played live with other local Cincinnati bands.

In 1997, the Bears began recording together again in occasional weekend sessions at Belew's home studio. These sessions finally resulted in a new album, Car Caught Fire, in 2001. The CD was released independently by the band, and also by the Pony Canyon label in Japan. The band toured small clubs in early and late 2002, mainly in the Midwest and South. The Bears Live CD was released in between the two tours. In 2004, a concert DVD featuring a show recorded in 2002 at the Club Cafe in Pittsburgh was released. A documentary filmed during several shows of the early 2002 tour, titled The Bears: Out Of Hibernation and directed by D.P. Carlson, was given limited screenings in Chicago and Cincinnati in 2005, but has not been widely released.

Following the 2002 Bears tours, Belew re-focused on his solo career, releasing the albums Side One, Side Two and Side Three in 2005 and 2006 and touring as a "power trio." The other three members regrouped as psychodots in 2005 to record and release the first psychodots studio album in a decade, Terminal Blvd.. Arduser, Fetters and Nyswonger all released solo albums around this time as well.

Starting in 2003, the Bears regrouped for more weekend sessions to record a new album, which was released independently on April 3, 2007, and titled Eureka!, followed by a quick eight-date tour. The band's first two albums remained out of print until becoming available as digital downloads in February 2009.

Drummer Chris Arduser passed away on September 27, 2023

== Discography ==
=== Studio albums ===
- The Bears (1987)
- Rise and Shine (1988)
- Car Caught Fire (2001)
- Eureka! (2007)

=== Live albums ===
- The Bears Live (2002)
- The Bears Live at Club Cafe (DVD 2004)
