= Desire of the Rhino King =

Compilation album by Adrian Belew
- Released: November 5, 1991
- Genres: Experimental rock, AOR
- Length: 71:58
- Label: Island
- Producer: Adrian Belew

Adrian Belew chronology
Young Lions (1990)	Desire of the Rhino King (1991)	Inner Revolution (1992)

Professional ratings
Review scores
Source	Rating
Allmusic	4/5 stars

Desire of the Rhino King is a compilation album released in 1991 by experimental rock musician and guitarist Adrian Belew. It includes songs from Belew's first three solo albums for Island Records: Lone Rhino (1982), Twang Bar King (1983), and Desire Caught By the Tail (1986).

Track 18 is an outtake from the Desire sessions, appearing for the first time on CD. It was first released on a Flexi disc included with the March 1987 issue of Guitar Player.

== Track listing ==
All tracks are written by Adrian Belew except where noted.

No.	Title	Writer(s)	Original album	Length
1.	"The Final Rhino"		Lone Rhino (1982)	1:25
2.	"The Lone Rhinoceros"		Lone Rhino	3:59
3.	"Big Electric Cat"		Lone Rhino	4:52
4.	"The Momur"		Lone Rhino	3:48
5.	"Hot Sun"		Lone Rhino	1:31
6.	"The Man in the Moon"		Lone Rhino	3:48
7.	"Swingline"		Lone Rhino	3:29
8.	"Adidas in Heat"		Lone Rhino	2:46
9.	"Fish Head"		Twang Bar King (1983)	4:31
10.	"The Ideal Woman"		Twang Bar King	4:09
11.	"Sexy Rhino"		Twang Bar King	0:37
12.	"Twang Bar King"		Twang Bar King	1:27
13.	"Paint the Road"	Belew, Bill Janssen	Twang Bar King	3:21
14.	"She Is Not Dead"		Twang Bar King	4:43
15.	"The Rail Song"		Twang Bar King	5:38
16.	"Ballet for a Blue Whale"		Twang Bar King	4:45
17.	"The Gypsy Zurna"		Desire Caught by the Tail (1986)	3:06
18.	"Joan Miro's Procession Through the Insides of a Purple Antelope Across a Sea of Tuna Fish"		Guitar Player magazine (March 1987)	3:05
19.	"Portrait of Margaret"		Desire Caught by the Tail	3:58
20.	"Laughing Man"		Desire Caught by the Tail	5:31
21.	"Guernica"		Desire Caught by the Tail	2:18
Total length:				71:58

== Personnel ==
=== Musicians ===
- Adrian Belew – guitar, percussion, piano, drums, vocals,
- Audie Belew – piano
- Christy Bley – keyboards, vocals
- Larrie Londin – drums
- Clif Mayhugh – bass, vocals
- Bill Janssen – saxophone, vocals

=== Technical ===
- Adrian Belew – producer, liner notes, cover art concept
- Stan Hertzman – executive producer, photography
- Gary Platt – engineer
- Rich Denhart – assistant engineer
- Greg Calbi – remastering
- Christine Rodin – photography
- Margaret Belew – cover design, cover art
