= Young Lions (album) =

Studio album by Adrian Belew
- Released: May 8, 1990
- Recorded: 1989–90
- Studio: Royal Recorders, Lake Geneva, WI
- Genre: Rock
- Length: 38:17
- Label: Atlantic
- Producer: Adrian Belew

Adrian Belew chronology
Mr. Music Head (1989)	Young Lions (1990)	Desire of the Rhino King (1991)

Singles from Young Lions
- 1. "Pretty Pink Rose" Released: May 1990

Professional ratings
Review scores
Source	Rating
AllMusic	3.5/5 stars

Young Lions is the fifth solo album by Adrian Belew released in May 1990 by Atlantic Records. The album featured David Bowie singing on two tracks, "Pretty Pink Rose" and "Gunman", the latter of which Bowie and Belew co-wrote since he was acting as musical director and lead guitarist on the Sound+Vision Tour with Bowie.

Two cover versions appear on the album: "Heartbeat", a song Belew had co-written and performed with King Crimson while he was a member; and "Not Alone Anymore", a Traveling Wilburys song from Traveling Wilburys Vol. 1. This was Belew's tribute to Roy Orbison who had recently died.

The other songwriting "collaboration" on the album is with Nashville radio evangelist Prophet Omega. Working decades-old tapes of Omega's broadcasts into "I Am What I Am", Belew, "listed him as a co-author, so in case a couple of hefty guys drop by my place some day, I can say 'here's your money.' " Al Kooper, who collects "oddball" recordings, gave a 47-minute recording of Omega preaching and Belew made two further recordings: "I Know What I Know" on Coming Attractions and "Troubles" on Side Three.

Belew was pressed for time for the cover artwork and it was hurriedly completed by Atlantic's art department. It features a then five-year-old Robert S. Belew on his way to Sunday school carrying a stuffed animal.

== Track listing ==
All songs written by Adrian Belew unless noted:

1. "Young Lions" – 3:48
2. "Pretty Pink Rose" (David Bowie) – 4:44
3. "Heartbeat" (Belew, Bill Bruford, Robert Fripp, Tony Levin) – 3:59
4. "Looking for a U.F.O." – 3:36
5. "I Am What I Am" (Belew, Prophet Omega) – 4:11
6. "Not Alone Anymore" (Jeff Lynne, Tom Petty, George Harrison, Bob Dylan, Roy Orbison) – 3:13
7. "Men in Helicopters" – 3:17
8. "Small World" – 3:45
9. "Phone Call from the Moon" – 3:38
10. "Gunman" (music: Belew; lyrics: Bowie) – 3:51

== Personnel ==
=== Musicians ===
- Adrian Belew – vocals, multi-instruments
- David Bowie – vocals (tracks 2, 10)
- Mike Barnett – string bass (track 9)
- Van Kampen – percussion ensemble (track 1)
  - Ellen Gieles – percussion
  - Dree Van Beeck – percussion
  - Willem Van Kruysdijk – percussion
  - Mies Wilbrink – percussion
- The Prophet Omega – spoken word (track 5)

=== Technical ===
- Adrian Belew – producer
- Ron Fajerstein – executive producer
- Justin Hertzman – executive producer
- Rich Denhart – engineer
- Michael White – engineer
- Dan Harjung – assistant engineer
- Ted Jensen – digital mastering, mastering
- Carol Bobolts – design
- Bob Defrin – art direction
- Sotto Vocé – cover art concept
- John M. Stevens – lettering
- Curtice Taylor – photo tinting
