= Beat (American band) =

American rock supergroup

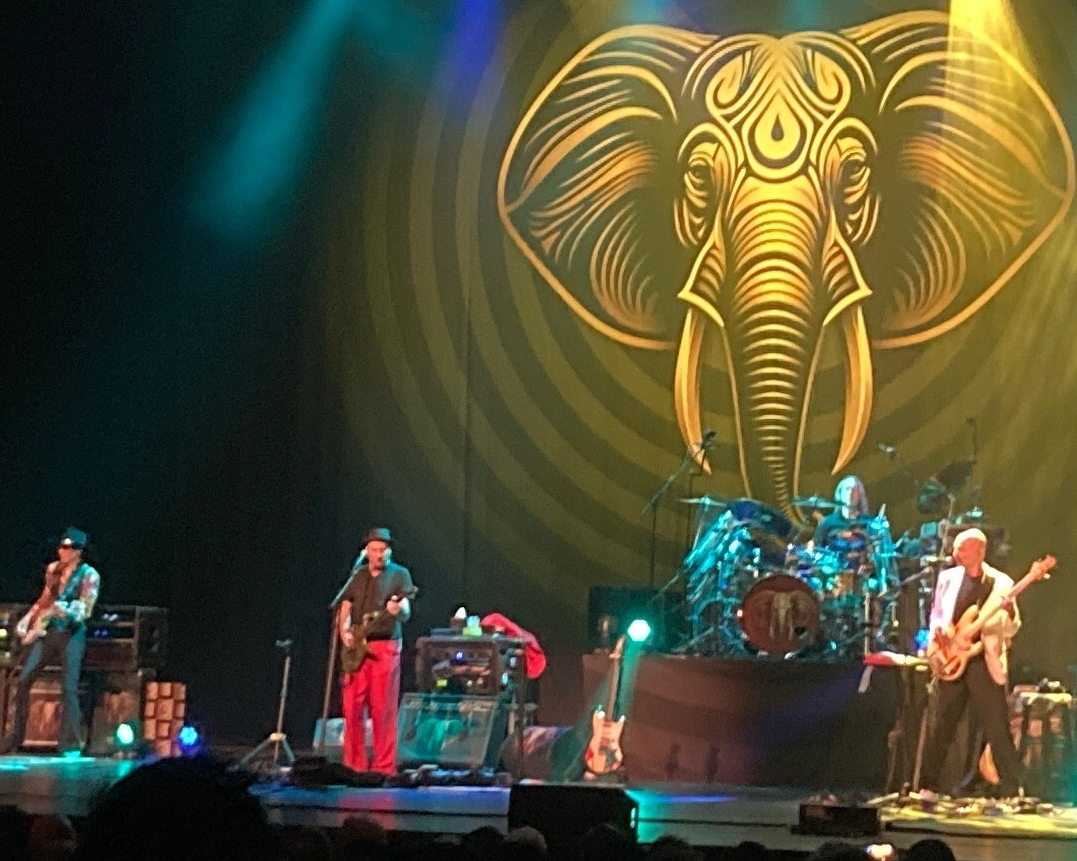
- Beat in 2024

Background information
- Origin: United States
- Genres: Progressive rock; new wave
- Years active: 2024–present
- Label: Inside Out Music
- Spinoff of: King Crimson
- Members: Adrian Belew; Tony Levin; Steve Vai; Terry Bozzio
- Past members: Danny Carey
- Website: beat-tour.com

Beat, stylized in all caps as BEAT, is an American rock supergroup and touring project formed in 2024. It originally featured former King Crimson members Adrian Belew and Tony Levin alongside guitarist Steve Vai, and drummer Danny Carey. Terry Bozzio filled in for Carey during their Fall 2026 tour. The project was assembled to reinterpret and perform material from King Crimson’s albums Discipline (1981), Beat (1982), and Three of a Perfect Pair (1984), which featured Belew and Levin.

== History ==
Beat's tour began with a North American leg in 2024, where in excess of 60 dates were performed, featuring music drawn from the three King Crimson albums that inspired the project.

In 2025, the group continued touring across Mexico and South America, and later announced a return to Japan with a performance at the Nippon Budokan on September 1.

In December 2025, Beat announced an extensive summer 2026 tour across Europe. The itinerary includes headline performances in major European cities such as London, Paris, Munich, Vienna, Madrid, and Barcelona, followed by additional festival appearances at venues like the Amphitheatre of Pompeii in Italy.

Due to Carey's commitments with Tool, he will be replaced by former Frank Zappa and U.K. drummer Terry Bozzio for Beat's Fall 2026 US tour.

== Band members ==
Official members

- Adrian Belew – lead vocals, guitar (2024–present)
- Tony Levin – bass guitar, Chapman Stick, synthesizer, backing vocals (2024–present)
- Steve Vai – guitar (2024–present)
- Danny Carey – drums, percussion (2024–present; not touring since October 2026)

Touring member

- Terry Bozzio – drums (2026–present)

== Discography ==
- Live (2025) — live album documenting performances from the 2024–25 US tour.
