= Prophet Omega =

American radio evangelist

Prophet Omega (real name Omega Townsend; August 27, 1927 – February 28, 1992) was a weekly radio evangelist broadcasting in Nashville, Tennessee on Music Row’s WNAH in the 1970s. He was the founder of the Peaceway Temple, then located at "Apartment Q-258 at 488 Lemont Drive" (the Kenmont Apartments). He has become most known for the recordings of his sermons, which became popular among musicians in the 1980s. Before entering the "prophet circuit," Townsend was a carnival worker.

== Music subculture ==
By way of cassette recordings Prophet Omega's sermons developed a cult following among road musicians in the late 1980s and early 1990s. The cassettes were favorites on musician tour buses. Excerpts of his sermons have been sampled into rock music, and quotes from his sermons have become the namesake of music projects. The Rolling Stones and David Bowie were among the many fans. Melissa Etheridge and Adrian Belew both have used his excerpts in their works, and Ramsay Midwood does a spoken word prologue using sermon citations for a new version of the old blues standard "Chicago" (on his album Undone: Bootleg Recordings, 2003, Vanguard Records 833-2). Al Kooper contributed largely to the initial spreading of Prophet Omega recordings among musicians. He considers the recordings to be a form of folk art.

Musicians have noted Omega's sense of rhythm, soul artist sound (like James Brown), and blues artist sound. Also, they noted a sense of 'knowing' in association with the ingroup that had heard his recordings. The following is an excerpt from one of his more popularized sermons:

...repeat these words, I am what I am and that's all I am is what I am. That's all I am is what I am ...and I am It. Now, repeat those words. If you repeat those words and continually to repeat those words Blessings gonna come to you. You got to remain to being your self. You cannot be nobody else. Ain't no use in tryin' bein' no whirlwind and jumping here and playing checkers with your own life. That ain't gonna work, baby. Now, repeat these words behind me, I am what I am. Now, that's all you are! You are what you believe you are....

A half-hour documentary about Prophet Omega entitled Friends Seen and Unseen was created by Kathy Conkwright and Demetria Kalodimos, and edited by Bobby F. Dowd. It was released by Genuine Human Productions in 2000. It was presented at the 2000 Nashville Independent Film Festival. The film won a Tennessee Spirit Award.

An excerpt from one of Prophet Omega's sermons can be heard in the background in a scene from the 2007 horror film Side Sho, directed by Nashville filmmaker Michael D'Anna.

Upon his death, the original reel-to-reel recordings of his show were disposed of by his family. However in 2006, a 2-CD set of his recordings gathered from collectors was released entitled The Complete Sermons.
