= Heartbeat (King Crimson song) =

Single by King Crimson

from the album Beat
- B-side: "Requiem"
- Released: 4 June 1982
- Recorded: 1982
- Genre: New wave; pop rock
- Length: 3:54
- Label: Warner Records
- Songwriters: Adrian Belew, Bill Bruford, Robert Fripp, Tony Levin
- Producer: Rhett Davies

King Crimson singles chronology
"Thela Hun Ginjeet" (1981)	"Heartbeat" (1982)	"Sleepless" (1984)

"Heartbeat" is a song by the band King Crimson, released as a single in 1982. The music video stars Jill Kroesen and was innovative for its use of blending faces with a dissolving /morphing technique that would later be employed in music videos for Godley & Creme's "Cry" (1985) and Michael Jackson's "Black or White" (1991).

The song was later recorded by King Crimson guitarist and singer Adrian Belew for his 1990 solo album, Young Lions.

== Track listing ==
=== 7" version ===
1. "Heartbeat" (Adrian Belew, Bill Bruford, Robert Fripp, Tony Levin)
2. "Requiem" (Edited version) (Belew, Bruford, Fripp, Levin)

=== 12" version ===
1. "Heartbeat" (Belew, Bruford, Fripp, Levin)
2. "Neal and Jack and Me" (Belew, Bruford, Fripp, Levin)
3. "Sartori in Tangier" (Belew, Bruford, Fripp, Levin)

== Personnel ==
- Adrian Belew – guitar, lead vocals
- Robert Fripp – guitar
- Tony Levin – bass guitar, Chapman stick, backing vocals
- Bill Bruford – drums

== Charts ==
Chart (1982)	Peak position
US Mainstream Rock (Billboard)	57
