= Sleepless (King Crimson song) =

Single by King Crimson

from the album Three of a Perfect Pair
- B-side: "Nuages"
- Released: 2 March 1984
- Genre: Rock, funk, dance
- Length: 5:24
- Label: Warner Records
- Songwriters: Adrian Belew, Bill Bruford, Robert Fripp, and Tony Levin.
- Producer: King Crimson

King Crimson singles chronology
"Heartbeat" (1984)	"Sleepless" (1984)	"Dinosaur" (1995)

"Sleepless" is a song by the band King Crimson from their 1984 album Three of a Perfect Pair. The song was released as a single in March 1984 and mixed for radio by Bob Clearmountain. The track features a bass-line played by Tony Levin consisting of a slapping technique to create a pulsating beat. "Sleepless" received a music video that includes all four members of the band.

Music Week characterised the song as "a classy contemporary dance track that has general pop appeal."

== Track listing ==
All tracks are written by Adrian Belew, Bill Bruford, Robert Fripp, and Tony Levin.

7" version
No.	Title	Length
1.	"Sleepless" (single mix)	3:46
2.	"Nuages (That Which Passes, Passes Like Clouds)"	4:47
Total length:		8:33

UK 12" version
No.	Title	Length
1.	"Sleepless" (dance mix)	7:18
2.	"Sleepless" (instrumental mix)	6:15
3.	"Sleepless" (single mix)	3:35
Total length:		17:08

US 12" version
No.	Title	Length
1.	"Sleepless" (dance mix)	7:07
2.	"Sleepless" (instrumental mix)	5:45
Total length:		12:52

== Personnel ==
King Crimson

- Adrian Belew – guitar, lead vocals
- Robert Fripp – guitar
- Tony Levin – bass, Chapman stick, synthesizer, backing vocals
- Bill Bruford – drums

Additional personnel

- François Kevorkian – mixing (dance and instrumental versions)
- Bob Clearmountain – mixing (single version)

== Charts ==
Chart (1982)	Peak position
UK Singles (Official Charts)	79
US Mainstream Rock (Billboard)	51

== Uses in popular culture ==
A remixed version has been used as the interlude music for the long-running Australian Broadcasting Commission music video program Rage. The accompanying video clip features excerpts from the original music video for the song.
