= Belew Prints: The Acoustic Adrian Belew, Vol. 2 =

Belewprints

Studio album by Adrian Belew
- Released: 1998
- Recorded: December 9, 1996 – April 21, 1997
- Genre: Rock
- Length: 48:14
- Label: DGM
- Producer: Adrian Belew

Adrian Belew chronology
Op Zop Too Wah (1996)	Belewprints (1998)	Salad Days (1999)

Professional ratings
Review scores
Source	Rating
AllMusic	3/5 stars

Belew Prints: The Acoustic Adrian Belew Volume Two is the eleventh solo album by Adrian Belew, released in 1998. A sequel to 1993's The Acoustic Adrian Belew, it features stripped-down acoustic arrangements of previously recorded Belew songs. The instrumentation mainly consists of acoustic guitars- but Belew also plays piano, acoustic bass, drums and percussion on some songs. "Men In Helicopters" is performed with a string quartet.

The album contains two reworked King Crimson songs which Belew co-wrote and performed with the band's 1990s incarnation ("Cage" and "Dinosaur"), and a Beatles cover ("Free as a Bird").

== Track listing ==
1. "Men in Helicopters" (Belew) – 3:09
2. "Cage" (Belew, Bill Bruford, Robert Fripp, Trey Gunn, Tony Levin, Pat Mastelotto) – 2:25
3. "I Remember How to Forget" (Belew) - 3:36
4. "Young Lions" (Belew) – 3:07
5. "Never Enough" (Belew) – 3:31
6. "Things You Hit with a Stick" (Belew) – 2:05
7. "Everything" (Belew) – 2:56
8. "Big Blue Sun" (Belew) – 2:58
9. "Bad Days" (Belew) – 2:58
10. "One of Those Days" (Belew) – 3:01
11. "Return of the Chicken" (Belew) – 1:36
12. "Dinosaur" (Belew, Bruford, Fripp, Gunn, Levin, Mastelotto) – 5:44
13. "1967" (Belew) – 5:36
14. "Free as a Bird" (John Lennon) (Live at the Longacre Theater, NYC) – 3:19
15. "Nude Wrestling with a Christmas Tree" (Belew) – 2:08

The Japanese CD release running order is different and includes “Inner Revolution” and “Brave New World”, but not “Young Lions” and “Everything”.
The booklet contains a detailed diary of the work’s progress.

== Personnel ==
=== Musicians ===
- Adrian Belew – acoustic guitars, piano, string bass, acoustic drums, percussion, vocals
- David Davidson – first violin on “Men in Helicopters”
- David Angell – second violin on “Men in Helicopters”
- Kristin Wilkinson – viola on “Men in Helicopters”
- John Catchings – cello on “Men in Helicopters”

=== Technical ===
- Adrian Belew – producer
- Ken Latchney – engineer
- Julie Schrader – layout
- Michael Wilson – photography
- Stan Hertzman – photography
