= Mr. Music Head =

Studio album by Adrian Belew
- Released: April 24, 1989
- Recorded: 1988–89
- Studio: Royal Recorders, Lake Geneva, Wisconsin
- Genre: Electronic rock; new wave
- Length: 45:37
- Label: Atlantic
- Producer: Adrian Belew

Adrian Belew chronology
Desire Caught by the Tail (1986)	Mr. Music Head (1989)	Young Lions (1990)

Singles from Mr. Music Head
- 1. "Oh Daddy" Released: July 1989

Professional ratings
Review scores
Source	Rating
AllMusic	3/5 stars
Rolling Stone	3/5 stars

Mr. Music Head is the fourth solo album by Adrian Belew, released in April 1989, and his first for Atlantic Records. It features the single "Oh Daddy", which reached number 5 in the weekly Billboard Modern Rock Tracks chart.

== Background ==
The album was recorded following the unwilling split of Belew's mid-1980s band the Bears, which dissolved due to a lack of record company support (following which Belew managed to secure a solo deal). Belew recorded the majority of the album by himself, making use of his own multi-instrumental skills and his ability to create assorted sonic and instrumental impressions via processed guitar sound. The album also features prominent use of piano, an instrument on which Belew was not particularly confident but which he included on several songs that he believed required it.

The album features Belew's second duet with his daughter Audie, with whom he had previously recorded the piano-and-guitar duet "The Final Rhino" on his Lone Rhino album in late 1981, when Audie was four. This time, Belew wrote "Oh Daddy", a humorous father-and-daughter pop duet for Audie (now 11) and him to sing, with lyrics poking gentle fun at Belew's own pop ambitions and career to date. Its video features Belew playing the rubber-necked guitar prop which he'd previously employed for the Home of the Brave project with Laurie Anderson.

== Track listing ==
All songs written by Adrian Belew, except where noted.

1. "Oh Daddy" – 3:05
2. "House of Cards" – 3:44
3. "One of Those Days" – 3:21
4. "Coconuts" (Belew, Stan Hertzman) – 3:29
5. "Bad Days" – 3:06
6. "Peaceable Kingdom" – 3:36
7. "Hot Zoo" – 4:24
8. "Motor Bungalow" – 3:36
9. "Bumpity Bump" – 3:46
10. "Bird in a Box" – 3:16
11. "1967" – 5:23
12. "Cruelty to Animals" – 4:23
- The last track, "Cruelty to Animals", is not included on vinyl or audio cassette releases.

== Personnel ==
Musicians

- Adrian Belew – vocals, guitars, piano, bass guitar, drums, percussion, additional instrumentation
- Mike Barnett – string bass (tracks 2, 11)
- Audie Belew – vocal ("Oh Daddy")

Technical

- Adrian Belew – producer
- Rich Denhart – engineer
- Dan Harjung – assistant engineer
- Adrian (Sotto Vocé) – cover design
- Sandy Ostroff – photography
- Stan Hertzman – photography
