= Desire Caught by the Tail (album) =

Studio album by Adrian Belew
- Released: 1986
- Recorded: 1985–86
- Studios: Creative Audio, Urbana, IL
- Genre: Experimental
- Length: 32:59
- Label: Island
- Producer: Adrian Belew

Adrian Belew chronology
Twang Bar King (1983)	Desire Caught by the Tail (1986)	Mr. Music Head (1989)

Desire Caught by the Tail is the third solo album by Adrian Belew, released in 1986. It is an instrumental record that was written, arranged and performed by Belew alone.

Unlike its predecessors Lone Rhino and Twang Bar King, Desire Caught By the Tail is an entirely experimental album. It was recorded using treated, multi-tracked electric guitars, guitar synthesizer, keyboards and assorted percussion instruments.

The title Desire Caught by the Tail is from the play 'Le Désir attrapé par la queue', written by Pablo Picasso. The album is in part inspired by Picasso, with both the sound and the composition style being more abstract, harsh and loosely structured than much of Belew's other solo repertoire.

== Critical reception ==
Professional ratings
Review scores
Source	Rating
AllMusic	3.5/5 stars

The New York Times wrote that "by multitracking guitars and percussion, [Belew] can follow odder whims - inventing quasi-Middle Eastern folk melodies (and making his guitar sound like a musette), melting down tunes halfway through, piling up electronic yowls and twitters. Mr. Belew mixes eerie resonances and slapstick timing; even in instrumentals, his grin comes through."

== Trivia ==
Belew reused a part of "Tango Zebra" as "Peace on Earth" on his 1994 album Here.

== Track listing ==
All tracks written and arranged by Adrian Belew.

1. "Tango Zebra" – 7:30
2. "Laughing Man" – 5:28
3. "The Gypsy Zurna" – 3:03
4. "Portrait of Margaret" – 4:00
5. "Beach Creatures Dancing Like Cranes" – 3:28
6. "At the Seaside Café" – 1:50
7. "Guernica" – 2:00
8. ""Z"" – 5:40

== Personnel ==
- Adrian Belew – guitar, Roland GR-700 guitar synthesizer, pedals, assorted percussion
- Stan Hertzman – executive producer
- Rich Denhart – engineer
- Jim Bartz – assistant engineer
- Ted Jensen at Sterling Sound, NYC – mastering
- Bruce Breckenfeld – technician
- Paul Hixson – photography (front cover)
- Chris Covatta – photography (back cover)
- Margaret Belew – paintings
- Sotto Vocé – cover design
