= Side Four =

Live album by Adrian Belew
- Released: November 16, 2007
- Recorded: February 16, 2007
- Venues: Canal Street Tavern, Dayton, OH
- Genre: Progressive rock
- Length: 67:09
- Label: Adrian Belew Presents
- Producer: Adrian Belew

Adrian Belew chronology
Side Three (2006)	Side Four (2007)	e (2009)

Side Four is a live album by the artist Adrian Belew, originally released on November 16, 2007.

The album was recorded live at Canal Street Tavern in Dayton, Ohio on February 16, 2007. The tracks "Dinosaur", "Three of a Perfect Pair" and "Thela Hun Ginjeet" were originally recorded by King Crimson.

The album features Belew performing with Julie Slick (bass guitar) and Eric Slick (drums), the two sibling musicians with whom he'd later form the Adrian Belew Power Trio.

== Track listing ==
All songs written by Adrian Belew except where noted.

1. "Writing on the Wall" – 4:09
2. "Dinosaur" (Belew, Bill Bruford, Robert Fripp, Tony Levin, Pat Mastelotto, Trey Gunn) – 4:59
3. "Ampersand" – 4:39
4. "Young Lions" – 4:13
5. "Beat Box Guitar" – 11:07
6. "Matchless Man" – 4:49
7. "A Little Madness" – 6:07
8. "Drive" – 7:21
9. "Of Bow and Drum" – 4:45
10. "Big Electric Cat" – 3:44
11. Acknowledgements – :50
12. "Three of a Perfect Pair" (Belew, Bruford, Fripp, Levin) – 4:07
13. "Thela Hun Ginjeet" (Belew, Bruford, Fripp, Levin) – 6:11

== Personnel ==
=== Musicians ===
- Adrian Belew – guitars, vocals
- Julie Slick – bass
- Eric Slick – drums
- Biff Blumfumgagne – backing vocals

=== Technical ===
- Adrian Belew – producer, artwork
- John Sinks – engineer
- Saul Zonana – mastering
- Julie Rust – layout
- Mark Colman – photography
