= The Bears (album) =

Studio album by the Bears
- Released: 1987
- Recorded: 1987
- Studios: Royal, Lake Geneva WI
- Genres: Pop, rock
- Labels: Primitive Man, I.R.S.
- Producer: Adrian Belew

The Bears chronology
The Bears (1987)	Rise and Shine (1988)

The Bears is the debut studio album by the rock band the Bears, released in 1987.

The cover art was created by Mort Drucker.

== Critical reception ==
Professional ratings
Review scores
Source	Rating
AllMusic	4.4/5 stars
The Encyclopedia of Popular Music	4/5 stars

AllMusic wrote that "the tunes are tight, smart pop gems, distinguished from so many other bands by the wild antics of Belew's guitar." The Washington Post called the album "a little too precious and labored ever to attain the unforced grace of good old rock 'n' roll."

Trouser Press wrote: "Challenging, muscular, tuneful, idiosyncratic and accessible, The Bears ... is a superlative record." The Encyclopedia of Popular Music remarked that the album "invoked comparisons with Squeeze and XTC, and for good reason."

== Track listing ==
1. "None of the Above" (Adrian Belew, Bob Nyswonger, Chris Arduser, Rob Fetters)
2. "Fear Is Never Boring" (Fetters)
3. "Honey Bee" (Belew)
4. "Man Behind the Curtain" (Belew, Nyswonger, Fetters)
5. "Wavelength" (Belew)
6. "Trust" (Nyswonger)
7. "Raining" (Belew, Nyswonger, Fetters)
8. "Superboy" (Belew, Fetters)
9. "Meet Me in the Dark" (Belew)
10. "Figure It Out" (Belew, Nyswonger, Arduser, Fetters)

== Personnel ==
- Adrian Belew – guitar, vocals
- Rob Fetters – guitar, vocals
- Bob Nyswonger – bass
- Chris Arduser – drums
