= Rise and Shine (The Bears album) =

Studio album by the Bears
- Released: 1988
- Recorded: November and December 1987
- Studios: Royal, Lake Geneva, Wisconsin
- Label: Primitive Man Recording Company
- Producer: Adrian Belew

The Bears chronology
The Bears (1987)	Rise and Shine (1988)	Car Caught Fire (2001)

Rise and Shine is a studio album by the American band the Bears, released in 1988. The band supported the album with a North American tour.

It was digitally recorded and mixed at Royal Recorders in Lake Geneva, Wisconsin, in November and December 1987. It was mastered at Sterling Sound, in New York City, by Ted Jensen.

== Critical reception ==
Professional ratings
Review scores
Source	Rating
AllMusic	3/5 stars

The Sun-Sentinel wrote that "Rise and Shine has a much harder instrumental edge than The Bears ... Belew's guitar stands up and roars on the dance-groove running through 'Rabbit Manor,' and on 'Complicated Potatoes,' a lyrically silly song with unexpectedly vicious guitar riffs." The Chicago Tribune argued that the band traded "bouncy good humor for serious concerns and simple upbeat melodies for a more angular, oblique approach." The Richmond Times-Dispatch opined that "the necessity of arranging around curious progressions, meter and lyrics leaves the group little room to sound relaxed."

== Track listing ==
1. "Aches and Pains"
2. "Save Me"
3. "Robobo's Beef"
4. "Not Worlds Apart"
5. "Nobody's Fool"
6. "Highway 2"
7. "Little Blue River"
8. "Rabbit Manor"
9. "Holy Mack"
10. "Complicated Potatoes"
11. "You Can Buy Friends"
12. "The Best Laid Plans"
13. "Old Fat Cadillac"
14. "Girl with Clouds"

== Personnel ==
- Adrian Belew – guitar, vocals
- Rob Fetters – guitar, vocals
- Bob Nyswonger – bass
- Chris Arduser – drums
