= Rob Fetters =

- Born: Toledo, Ohio, United States
- Occupations: Musician, guitarist, vocalist
- Instrument: Guitar
- Years active: 1971–present
- Website: https://robfetters.net/

Rob Fetters is an American musician, songwriter, and commercial music composer. He has performed as a guitarist and singer for power pop bands The Raisins, The Bears, psychodots, and has also released solo albums.

== Early life ==
Fetters was born on September 28, 1954, in Toledo, Ohio, and grew up in neighboring Sylvania. Fetters met fellow artists Chris Arduser and Bob Nyswonger while attending Sylvania High School. Fetters, Arduser and Nyswonger have been playing together off and on since 1971.

== Career ==
Fetters, Arduser, Nyswonger, and Adrian Belew formed The Bears in 1985 and began touring and recording until 1988. The trio "psychodots" recorded and performed starting in 1990, sometimes as Belew's tour support or backing band members.

The Bears regrouped in 2000 and continued performing until 2007. The psychodots continue to perform in the Cincinnati area.

Fetters has released five solo albums. His commercial scoring and commissioned work has included clients such as ABC, Disney, Nickelodeon, and PBS, as well as Microsoft, Crest and Kellogg’s.

As of the late 2010s, Fetters still performed occasionally with psychodots, most notably for the group's annual Thanksgiving concerts held in or near his hometown of Cincinnati, Ohio. Drummer Chris Arduser of psychodots died in 2023.

== Instruments ==
Fetters’ guitars include Fender Stratocasters, a Taylor 612-CE Acoustic, a 1974 Les Paul Custom, a 1967 Martin 00-18, a 1965 Rickenbacker 625, and a 2012 “partscaster” created by David Schneider. His amplifiers include a Vox AC-15 and Wavelength Audio Rob Fetters Signature designed by Gordon Rankin.

== Discography ==
=== Solo discography ===
- Lefty Loose Righty Tight (CD) – Baby Ranch Records (1998)
- Musician (CD) – Baby Ranch Records (2005)
- Saint Ain’t (CD) – Baby Ranch Records (2014)
- Ship Shake (CD) – Baby Ranch Records (2020)
- Mother (CD) – Baby Ranch Records (2023)

=== psychodots ===
- Psychodots (CD) Strugglebaby Recording Company (1991)
- On The Grid (CD) – Strugglebaby Recording Company (1993)
- Awkwardsville (CD) – Strugglebaby Recording Company (1995)
- Official Bootleg (CD) – Strugglebaby Recording Company (1998)
- Terminal Blvd (CD) – Baby Ranch Records (2005)

=== The Bears ===
- The Bears (LP) – Primitive Man Recording Company (1987)
- Rise and Shine (LP) – Primitive Man Recording Company (1988)
- Car Caught Fire (CD) – The Bears Music (2001)
- Live (CD) – The Bears Music (2002)
- Live at Club Café (DVD) – Merging Media (2004)
- Eureka! (CD) – The Bears Music (2007)

=== The Raisins ===
- Quarters / Tour Guide (Vinyl 45 rpm) Raisin Records (1981)
- The Raisins (LP) Strugglebaby Recording Company 1983 (CD 1993)
- Sucker Punch / Interspecies Love (Vinyl 45 rpm) Strugglebaby Recording Company 1983
- Valentine / Hoy Hoy Hoy (Vinyl 45 rpm) Raisin Records (1984)
- Everything and More (Cassette) 1985 Baby Ranch Recording Company (CD) 2000

=== As the sole producer ===
- Purple Kisses by 33 People (1995)
- Dinosaur Love by Lucky Spaulding (2001)
- Okodoro Oro by Baoku Moses (2004)
- Two Hearted by Dawg Yawp (2015)
