= Side Two =

Studio album by Adrian Belew
- Released: July 12, 2005
- Studios: StudioBelew, Mt. Juliet, Tennessee
- Genres: Rock, experimental rock, avant-garde, electronic
- Length: 33:12
- Label: Sanctuary
- Producer: Adrian Belew

Adrian Belew chronology
Side One (2005)	Side Two (2005)	Side Three (2006)

Professional ratings
Review scores
Source	Rating
AllMusic	4/5 stars

Side Two is the fourteenth solo album by Adrian Belew, released in 2005. It was recorded in his home studio and he played all the instruments himself on most tracks.

It is part of a series of albums. The other three are Side One, Side Three and Side Four. This album features the song "Dead Dog On Asphalt", inspired by the event (and Belew's cover painting of said event) mentioned below.

== Cover artwork ==
Previously, Adrian Belew was driving his truck and nearly hit a dog, when another ended up in front of him and couldn't get away. He had always wanted to be a painter, but never had something that he was inspired to paint. After dragging the dead dog off the road, he decided that he knew what he should paint. The result of this is the album's cover: resembling a 'dead dog on asphalt' (the opening track).

== Track listing ==
All songs written by Adrian Belew.

1. "Dead Dog on Asphalt" – 4:05
2. "I Wish I Knew" – 3:19
3. "Face to Face" – 3:03
4. "Asleep" – 5:23
5. "Sex Nerve" – 3:06
6. "Then What" – 3:02
7. "Quicksand" – 3:19
8. "I Know Now" – 1:26
9. "Happiness" – 1:53
10. "Sunlight" – 4:32

== Personnel ==
- Adrian Belew – vocals, guitars, keyboards, bass guitar, drums, percussions, electronics, additional instrumentation
- Erick Cole – left acoustic guitar (2), balalaika (3), Roland HandSonic Theremin (4)
- Peter Hyrka – violin (4)
- Gary Tussing – cello (4)
- Leah Belew – whispering voice (4)

=== Technical ===
- Adrian Belew – producer, cover art
- Ken Latchney – engineer
- Andrew Mendelson – mastering
- Julie Rust – layout
- Rick Malkin – photography
