= Twang Bar King =

Studio album by Adrian Belew
- Released: September 5, 1983
- Recorded: 1982–1983
- Studio: Cwazy Wabbit, C.V. Lloyde Complex, Champaign, IL
- Genre: New wave, pop rock, art rock, rock and roll
- Length: 42:59
- Label: Island
- Producer: Adrian Belew

Adrian Belew chronology
Lone Rhino (1982)	Twang Bar King (1983)	Desire Caught By the Tail (1986)

Twang Bar King is the second solo album by American musician Adrian Belew. It was released in 1983 on Island Records.

The album peaked at No. 146 on the Billboard 200.

== Production ==
Made while Belew was the frontman of King Crimson, Twang Bar King was recorded in between the sessions and tours for Beat and Three of a Perfect Pair in 1982 and 1983. Like Belew's debut album Lone Rhino, it features the members of Belew's pre- King Crimson band GaGa (this time augmented by session drummer Larrie Londin). This would be the last album on which Belew would feature the GaGa band, and he would largely perform all the instruments on his future albums himself. The R&B parody interlude "Sexy Rhino" continues the "rhino" theme from Lone Rhino and utilizes a Roland TR-808 drum machine and vocoder.

== Critical reception ==
Professional ratings
Review scores
Source	Rating
AllMusic	4/5 stars
The Encyclopedia of Popular Music	3/5 stars
MusicHound Rock: The Essential Album Guide	0/5 stars
The Rolling Stone Album Guide	2/5 stars

Trouser Press wrote that the album "does underscore his contributions to King Crimson: the distinctive vocabulary of extra-musical noises, the personality and, especially, the humor, which is in abundant evidence here." The Globe and Mail wrote that "despite Belew's cleverness, the rhythm section of J. Clifton Mayhugh and Larrie Londin does little that can be considered interesting."

== Track listing ==
All songs written and arranged by Adrian Belew except “I’m Down” written by John Lennon & Paul McCartney and “Paint the Road” written by William Janssen

1. "I'm Down" – 2:54
2. "I Wonder" – 4:39
3. "Life Without a Cage" – 3:20
4. "Sexy Rhino" – 0:37
5. "Twang Bar King" – 1:26
6. "Another Time" – 3:02
7. "The Rail Song" – 5:39
8. "Paint the Road" – 3:19
9. "She Is Not Dead" – 4:41
10. "Fish Head" – 4:30
11. "The Ideal Woman" – 4:08
12. "Ballet for a Blue Whale" – 4:44

== Personnel ==
Musicians

- Adrian Belew – guitars, percussion, lead vocals, arrangements
- Christy Bley – piano, backing vocals
- William Janssen – saxophones, bass clarinet, backing vocals
- Larrie Londin – drums
- J. Clifton Mayhugh – bass, backing vocals
- Gary Platt – bass trombone

Technical

- Stan Hertzman – executive producer
- Rich Denhart – assistant producer
- Gary Platt – engineer
- Rytt Hershberg – assistant engineer
- Mike Getz – artwork, design
