= Side One =

Studio album by Adrian Belew
- Released: January 25, 2005
- Recorded: 2004
- Studios: Rancho Relaxo; StudioBelew, Mt. Juliet, Tennessee
- Genre: Rock
- Length: 33:02
- Label: Sanctuary
- Producer: Adrian Belew

Adrian Belew chronology
Raven Songs 101 (2004)	Side One (2005)	Side Two (2005)

Professional ratings
Review scores
Source	Rating
AllMusic	link
The Music Box	2.5/5 link
Rolling Stone	favorable link

Side One is the thirteenth solo album by Adrian Belew, originally released in 2005. The album features bassist Les Claypool (from Primus) and drummer Danny Carey (from Tool) on its first three tracks.

The track "Beat Box Guitar" was nominated for a Grammy in the "Best Rock Instrumental Performance" category in 2005. (It lost to "69 Freedom Special" by Les Paul & Friends.) "Ampersand" & "Beat Box Guitar" had new versions appear on Side Three (2006).

== Track listing ==
All songs written by Adrian Belew, except where noted.

1. "Ampersand" – 4:23
2. "Writing on the Wall" – 3:53
3. "Matchless Man" – 2:32
4. "Madness" (Adrian Belew, Aram Khachaturian) – 6:54
5. "Walk Around the World" – 4:58
6. "Beat Box Guitar" – 5:08
7. "Under the Radar" – 1:39
8. "Elephants" – 2:15
9. "Pause" – 1:20

== Personnel ==
=== Musicians ===
- Adrian Belew – all instruments and vocals
- Les Claypool – bass (tracks 1–3)
- Danny Carey – drums (tracks 1–2), tabla (track 3)
- Gary Tussing – cello (track 4)
- Peter Hyrka – violin (tracks 4, 9)
- Ian Wallace – "voice of the BBC"

=== Technical ===
- Adrian Belew – producer, cover art
- Ken Latchney – engineer, mixing
- Andrew Mendelson – mastering
- Julie Rust – layout design
