= Inner Revolution =

Studio album by Adrian Belew
- Released: February 1992
- Recorded: March 24 – November 9, 1991
- Studio: Royal Recorders, Lake Geneva, WI
- Genre: Rock
- Length: 39:59
- Label: Atlantic
- Producer: Adrian Belew

Adrian Belew chronology
Desire of the Rhino King (1990)	Inner Revolution (1992)	The Acoustic Adrian Belew (1993)

Professional ratings
Review scores
Source	Rating
Allmusic	4/5 stars

Inner Revolution is the sixth solo album by Adrian Belew, originally released in 1992. Recorded in the wake of Belew's divorce from his first wife Margaret, the album is a collection of 1960s inspired pop songs. Along with his trademark guitar, Belew plays bass guitar, drums and occasional keyboards. Several other musicians appear, including Bears drummer Chris Arduser, acoustic bassist Mike Barnett, and a string quartet on "Big Blue Sun". Inner Revolution was re-released in 2003 by Wounded Bird Records.

== Track listing ==
All tracks composed by Adrian Belew.

1. "Inner Revolution" – 3:12
2. "This Is What I Believe In" – 3:28
3. "Standing in the Shadow" – 3:45
4. "Big Blue Sun" – 3:49
5. "Only a Dream" – 3:32
6. "Birds" – 2:22
7. "I’d Rather Be Right Here" – 3:08
8. "The War in the Gulf Between Us" – 3:29
9. "I Walk Alone" – 2:47
10. "Everything" – 2:55
11. "Heaven's Bed" – 4:04
12. "Member of the Tribe" – 3:11

== Personnel ==
=== Musicians ===
- Adrian Belew – vocals, guitar, bass guitar, drums, percussion, piano, keyboards.
- Mike Barnett – double bass (2)
- Chris Arduser – drums (2–3, 11–12)
- Jean Dickinson – violin (4)
- Lizbeth Getman – viola (4)
- Alison Lee Jewer – violin, string arrangement (4)
- Martha Pickart – cello (4)

=== Technical ===
- Adrian Belew – producer
- Ron Fajerstein, Stan Hertzman – executive producers
- Rich Denhart – engineer
- Dan Harjung – assistant engineer
- Ted Jensen – mastering
- Sotto Vocé – cover design
- Michael Wilson – photography
