= Michael D'Anna =

American film director

- Born: February 16, 1972 (age 54); Nashville, Tennessee, U.S.
- Occupations: Film director, writer, editor

Michael D'Anna (born February 16, 1972) is an American film director, best known for his work in horror films.

== Biography ==
D'Anna was born in Nashville, Tennessee. He began his filmmaking career in the early 1990s editing commercials and documentaries for clients throughout the southeastern United States. He then made the move into documentary filmmaking in 1998 with the television series Religions of the World, hosted by Academy Award winner Ben Kingsley.

A lifelong devotee of the horror film genre, he made his feature directorial debut in 2007 with the Lionsgate release Side Sho, taking home the award for Best Feature Film at the 2007 Terror Film Festival.

As of 2011, D'Anna teaches directing and documentary filmmaking at the Nashville Film Institute in Franklin, Tennessee. He is also a dealer & collector of rare movie posters and memorabilia, with one of the largest collections in the southeastern United States.

== Filmography ==
- Religions of the World (1998) – Director, film editor
- The Shelter (2005 film) – Editor
- Side Sho (2007) – Director, editor
- Chainsaw Cheerleaders (2009) – Editor
- Dogheads (2010) – Director, writer
- Dark as a Dungeon (2011) – Director, writer
