= Coming Attractions (album) =

Studio album by Adrian Belew
- Released: February 8, 2000
- Studio: Home recording
- Genre: Rock
- Length: 49:44
- Label: Thirsty Ear Recordings
- Producer: Adrian Belew

Adrian Belew chronology
Salad Days (1998)	Coming Attractions (2000)	Raven Songs 101 (2004)

Professional ratings
Review scores
Source	Rating
AllMusic	2.5/5 stars

Coming Attractions is the twelfth solo album by the musician Adrian Belew, originally released on February 8, 2000. As the title suggests, it collects material that was then otherwise unavailable that Belew intended to act as a "preview" of his forthcoming work. Tracks included were intended for a (then untitled) new solo album, an (eventually abandoned) third acoustic record, a series of instrumental compositions (from the eventually abandoned "Experimental Guitar Series"), and a then unfinished box set of rarities to be called DUST that would serve as an overview of his previous 20 years of activity.

== Reviews ==
Alternative Press (05/00, p. 76) - 3 out of 5
"...an engaging testament to the wide range of his formidable talents....Eclectic but cohesive [the album] is a perfect introduction to Belew's complex musical persona."

CMJ (1/31/00, p. 30)
"...humorously 'normal'. Ranging from a more traditional and song-focused Beatles tribute like '117 Valley Drive' to the experimental 'No Such Guitar,' COMING ATTRACTIONS shows the breadth of Belew's talent."

== Track listing ==
All tracks written by Adrian Belew except where noted.

1. "Inner Man" – 3:33
2. "Predator Feast" – 4:16
3. "117 Valley Drive" – 3:43
4. "Inner Revolution" – 3:21
5. "Time Waits" – 2:38
6. "I Know What I Know and That Is All I Know and I Know It" – 2:27
7. "People" (Adrian Belew, Bill Bruford, Robert Fripp, Trey Gunn, Tony Levin) – 3:47
8. "No Such Guitar" – 3:56
9. "Bird in a Box" – 3:33
10. "House of Cards" – 4:06
11. "The Man in the Moon" – 2:13
12. "Animal Kingdom" – 12:13

== Personnel ==
=== Musician ===
- Adrian Belew – vocals, guitars, bass guitar, keyboards, acoustic & electric drums, percussion, additional instrumentation

=== Technical ===
- Adrian Belew – producer, liner notes
- Ken Latchney – engineer
- Stan Hertzman – photography front cover
- Robert Ascroft – photography back cover
