= Johnson Amplification =

Subsidiary of DigiTech

Johnson Amplification was a subsidiary of DigiTech by the Harman Music Group, which manufactured and sold amplifiers using a design by John Johnson. Johnson amplifiers used tube integrated modeling technology, a method of emulating the sounds of several different types of classic and modern amplifier with a high degree of accuracy and ease of operation. The design incorporated the use of tubes as well as solid state circuitry. Among the popular products Johnson offered were the JM-150 combo amp, JM-250 Amplifier head and cabinets, the J-12 foot controller, the J-Station, and the JT-50 practice amp.

Johnson ceased operation in July 2002 and is no longer manufacturing these products, however their amplifiers remain quite popular in the after-market.
