= Op Zop Too Wah =

Studio album by Adrian Belew
- Released: September 24, 1996
- Recorded: March, April & May 1996
- Studio: Adrian Belew's Home Studio, Williams Bay, Wisconsin
- Genre: Experimental pop, electronic rock
- Length: 56:04
- Label: Adrian Belew Presents
- Producer: Adrian Belew

Adrian Belew chronology
The Experimental Guitar Series Volume 1: The Guitar as Orchestra (1995)	Op Zop Too Wah (1996)	Belew Prints: The Acoustic Adrian Belew, Vol. 2 (1998)

Professional ratings
Review scores
Source	Rating
Allmusic	3/5 stars

Op Zop Too Wah is the tenth solo album by Adrian Belew. The original title was On with a close-up of an on/off switch as the cover. However, Belew noticed an English band, Echobelly, had released an album with the same title. Op Zop Too Wah comes from a series of nonsensical words Belew invented in high school with his friend, Mike Wilshire.

Following the indifferent reception given to Belew's previous album (the experimental The Guitar As Orchestra), Op Zop Too Wah is a return to more traditional songwriting. The album's mood is reminiscent of the more avant-garde approach carried out by The Beatles in the late 1960s on albums such as Sgt. Pepper's Lonely Hearts Club Band. "I Remember How To Forget" was originally recorded with King Crimson in 1994, but never released.

== Reviews ==
Musician (12/96, pp. 89–91):
"...his best overall `pop' album yet....besides the usual winning, Beatles-inflected rockers...and craftily melodic ballads...there are also strong hints of Belew's non-pop output....the bruising riffs of `I Remember How To Forget' recall his work with King Crimson..."

== Track listing ==
All tracks written by Adrian Belew.

1. "Of Bow and Drum" – (4:34)
2. "Word Play Drum Beat" – (1:31)
3. "Six String" – (3:30)
4. "Conversation Piece" – (1:10)
5. "All Her Love Is Mine" – (4:28)
6. "I Remember How To Forget" – (3:53)
7. "What Do You Know (Part I)" – (1:01)
8. "Op Zop Too Wah" – (3:42)
9. "A Plate of Words" – (0:50)
10. "Time Waits" – (3:09)
11. "What Do You Know (Part II)" – (1:11)
12. "Modern Man Hurricane Blues" – (3:42)
13. "In My Backyard" – (0:56)
14. "A Plate of Guitar" – (0:47)
15. "Live in a Tree" – (1:05)
16. "Something to Do" – (2:40)
17. "Beautiful" – (2:49)
18. "High Wire Guitar" – (3:43)
19. "Sky Blue Red Bird Green House" – (3:03)
20. "The Ruin After the Rain" – (3:51)
21. "On" – (4:19)

== Personnel ==
=== Musicians ===
- Adrian Belew – guitars, piano, bass guitar, synthesizers, samplers, electronics, vocals
- Martha Belew, Sherry Webb, Iris Belew, Ken Latchney, Stan Hertzman – voices (2)

=== Technical ===
- Adrian Belew – producer, artwork, design
- Noah Evens – engineer
- Ken Latchney – engineer
- Glenn Meadows – mastering engineer
- Anna Valencia – art direction
- Grant Lovett – photography
