= Side Sho =

- Directed by: Michael D'Anna
- Written by: Frank Fox
- Produced by: Paula Fox
- Starring: John David Hart; Toni Robider; J. R. Reynolds; Dana Poulson
- Cinematography: Lou Chanatry
- Music by: Leonard Wolf
- Distributed by: Lionsgate
- Release date: August 1, 2007
- Running time: 89 minutes
- Country: United States
- Language: English

Side Sho is a 2007 horror film directed by Michael D'Anna. The film was shot in and around Savannah, Georgia, and won the awards for Best Feature Film and Best Original Score at the 2007 Terror Film Festival.

It was released on DVD July 29, 2008 by Lionsgate Entertainment.

== Premise ==
A suburban family on vacation in the backwoods of Florida venture off the main highway in search of historic roadside attractions, but find much more than they bargained for, including a forgotten tourist attraction that houses a dark secret.

== Production ==
Side Sho was inspired by writer Frank Fox's experiences visiting odd roadside attractions and carny exhibits as a child. Director Michael D'Anna took inspiration from classic horror films of the 1970s, such as Tobe Hooper's Eaten Alive (1977), Wes Craven's original The Hills Have Eyes (1977), and the southern gothic films of S. F. Brownrigg. Several reviewers have pointed out the plot similarities with Rob Zombie's House of 1000 Corpses (2003), but the director had not seen Zombie's film until he was already well into production.

The low budget production was fraught with problems, including the sudden loss of scheduled filming locations, special effects that refused to work properly, equipment malfunctions, and a rushed shooting schedule. Nevertheless, the film was completed on time and budget, in time for its July, 2007 premiere at the historic Belcourt Theater in Nashville, Tennessee. Many of the trials and tribulations of the films' production are related by director D'Anna and star John David (J.D.) Hart on the DVD commentary track.

It was released on DVD by Lionsgate in July 2008 with an audio commentary featuring the director and star, a making-of featurette, a blooper reel, and many other extras.

Side Sho was released without an MPAA rating.

== Reception ==
Side Sho received mixed reviews from critics. While many viewer reactions were negative, reviews from publications associated with the horror genre were considerably more favorable.

Horror website Dread Central commented that the film "isn't one of those movies you should skip given the chance to see it. It may have an audience out there, but for some it may be a excessive exercise in 'been there, done that'." Bloody Disgusting, Film Apocalypse, and Horror Junk, however, all gave the film positive notices. Fangoria magazine also gave the film a complimentary review.
