= Beat (King Crimson album) =

1982 progressive rock album

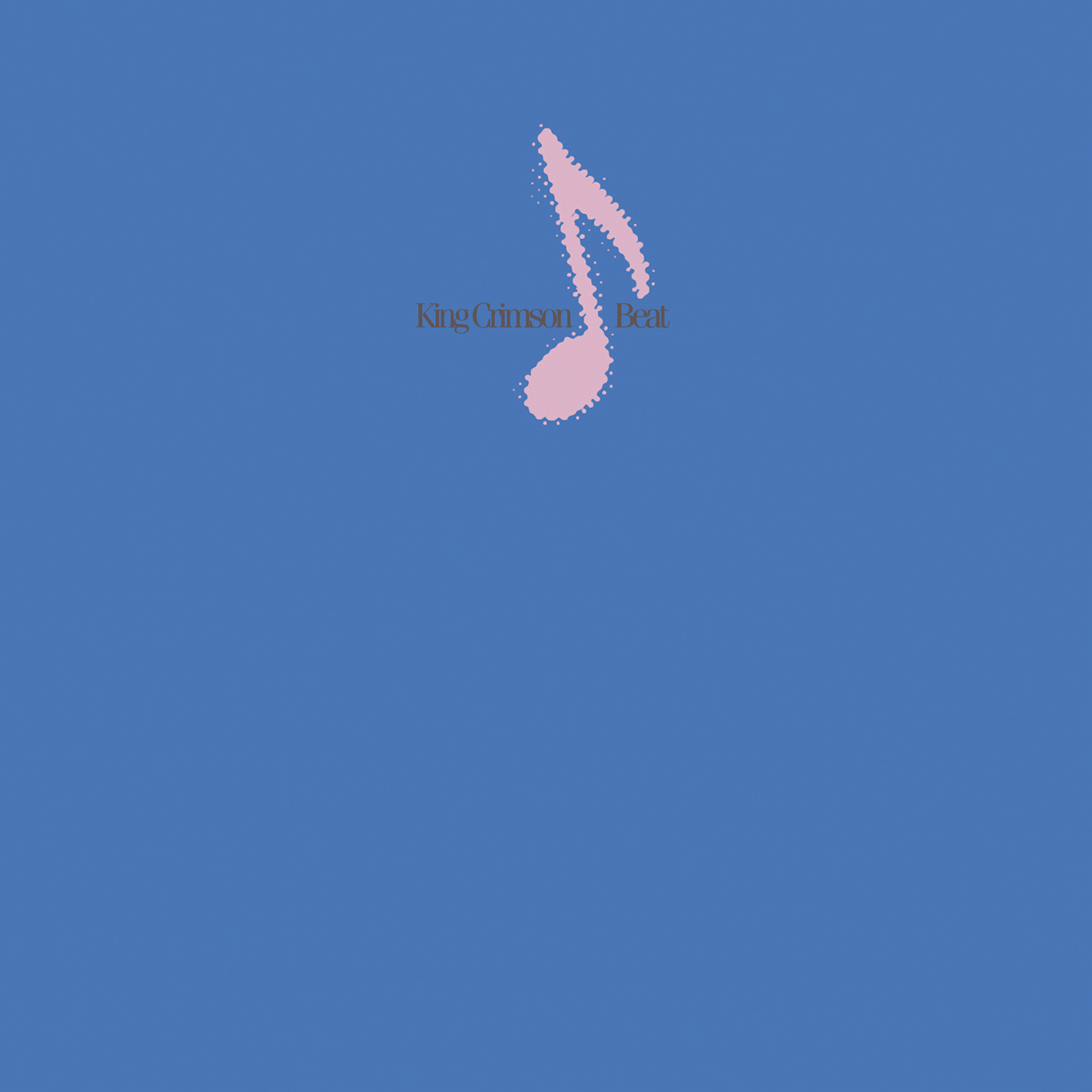

Studio album by King Crimson
- Released: 18 June 1982
- Recorded: March and April 1982
- Studios: Odyssey, London
- Genres: Progressive rock; new wave
- Length: 35:29; 45:08 (2016 reissue)
- Label: E.G.
- Producer: Rhett Davies

King Crimson chronology
Discipline (1981)	Beat (1982)	Three of a Perfect Pair (1984)

Singles from Beat
- 1. "Heartbeat" Released: 4 June 1982

Beat is the ninth studio album by the English progressive rock band King Crimson, released on 18 June 1982 by E.G. Records. It was the second King Crimson album to feature the lineup of Robert Fripp, Adrian Belew, Tony Levin and Bill Bruford, and the first ever King Crimson album to feature the same lineup as its predecessor.

== Background and production ==
Beat was inspired by the history and writings of the Beat Generation, spurred on by the twenty-fifth anniversary of the publication of Beat writer Jack Kerouac's novel On the Road. Adrian Belew recalls being "prompted by a note saying 'I'm wheels, I am moving wheels'" given to him by Robert Fripp, who suggested that Beat writings become the "lyrical underpinning" of the album after he saw Belew reading a work by Kerouac.

Opening track "Neal and Jack and Me" references Kerouac and Neal Cassady. Besides On the Road, the lyrics also mention Kerouac's novels The Subterraneans, Visions of Cody and Satori in Paris. The song was released as a B-side to "Heartbeat", the album's lone single. Musically, "Neal and Jack and Me" picks up where Discipline left off, with Fripp and Belew playing patterns in 5/4 and 7/8. "Heartbeat" is also the name of a book written by Cassady's wife Carolyn. "Sartori in Tangier" derives its title from Kerouac's Satori in Paris and the city of Tangier in Morocco, where a number of Beat writers and Paul Bowles (whose The Sheltering Sky provided the title for a track on Discipline) spent time. The instrumental's distinctive intro was performed by Tony Levin on the Chapman Stick; the introduction was longer on early live versions.

"Neurotica" shares its title with Neurotica, a Beat-era magazine. The song's Frippertronics intro is lifted directly from "Hååden Two" from Fripp's 1979 solo album Exposure. It had been performed live in 1981 as an instrumental titled "Manhattan". "The Howler" refers to Beat writer Allen Ginsberg's 1955 poem "Howl", which Fripp suggested to Belew as inspiration for the lyrics. The 15/8 guitar riff heard halfway through the song can be likened to the one Belew played on Tom Tom Club's "Genius of Love" in 1981. The song was first performed in early 1982 as an instrumental. Another instrumental track, entitled "Absent Lovers", was also performed during this time but not included on the album.

The recording of the final track, "Requiem", created tension between Fripp and Belew. The instrumental was built on a Frippertronics loop from Fripp's 1979 solo tour. After Levin and Bruford recorded rhythm tracks, Belew returned to the studio alone to record additional guitar overdubs. Fripp later did the same, though when the group had re-convened, Belew told Fripp to leave the studio in response. Fripp, though visibly upset, complied and headed for his home in Wimborne Minster. He was not heard from for several days, though a letter from Bruford and a phone call from manager Paddy Spinks led the group to "piece it all back together" and Belew would later apologise. However, the group did not reconvene until the beginning of their subsequent tour.

Fripp recalled that "at the time, Bill and Adrian thought that Beat was better than Discipline. For me, this [was] an indication of how far the band had already drifted from its original vision. The group broke up at the end of [the sessions]...I had nothing to do with the mixing of Beat, nor did I feel able to promote it. Somehow we absorbed that fact, and kept going." Belew considered the sessions "the most awful record-making experience of [his] life and one [he] would never choose to repeat", and both he and Bruford have stated in retrospect that "Heartbeat" and "Two Hands" should not have been included on the album.

== Release and reception ==
Professional ratings
Review scores
Source	Rating
AllMusic	4/5 stars
Rolling Stone	4/5 stars

Released on 18 June 1982, Beat peaked at number 39 in the UK Albums Chart. In a positive review, Trouser Press wrote that "the players push their instruments into a new form, akin to fusion and art-rock, but miles beyond either, and beyond description as well."

A 5.1 surround sound mix of the album by Fripp and Steven Wilson, started in 2009 and finished in 2013, was released in October 2016 for King Crimson's 40th Anniversary Series as a standalone CD/DVD package and as part of the On (and off) The Road (1981–1984) box set.

== Track listing ==
All music written by Adrian Belew, Robert Fripp, Tony Levin and Bill Bruford; all lyrics written by Adrian Belew except "Two Hands", by Margaret Belew.

Side one
No.	Title	Length
1.	"Neal and Jack and Me"	4:22
2.	"Heartbeat"	3:54
3.	"Sartori in Tangier" (instrumental)	3:34
4.	"Waiting Man"	4:27
Total length:		16:17

Side two
No.	Title	Length
5.	"Neurotica"	4:48
6.	"Two Hands"	3:23
7.	"The Howler"	4:13
8.	"Requiem" (instrumental)	6:48
Total length:		19:12

2016 CD reissue
No.	Title	Length
8.	"Requiem" (extended version)	12:15
9.	"Absent Lovers" (instrumental, bonus track)	4:12
Total length:		45:08

== Personnel ==
King Crimson

- Adrian Belew – electric guitar, guitar synthesizer, lead vocals
- Robert Fripp – electric guitar, guitar synthesizer, organ, Frippertronics
- Tony Levin – bass guitar, Chapman Stick, backing vocals
- Bill Bruford – acoustic and electronic drums, percussion

Additional personnel

- Rhett Davies – producer
- Graham Davies – equipment
- Rob O'Conner – cover design
- Tex Read – social services
- Patrick Spinks – management

== Charts ==
Album

Chart (1982)	Peak position
Canada Top Albums/CDs (RPM)	47
Japanese Albums (Oricon)	75
Norwegian Albums (VG-lista)	24
UK Albums (Official Charts)	39
US Billboard 200	52

Chart (2016)	Peak position
UK Rock & Metal Albums (Official Charts)	40

Single

Year	Single	Chart	Position
1982	"Heartbeat"	Billboard Mainstream Rock	57
