= Side Three =

Studio album by Adrian Belew
- Released: April 18, 2006
- Studios: StudioBelew, Mt. Juliet, Tennessee; Rancho Relaxo
- Genre: Rock
- Length: 38:40
- Label: Sanctuary
- Producer: Adrian Belew

Adrian Belew chronology
Side Two (2005)	Side Three (2006)	Side Four (2007)

Professional ratings
Review scores
Source	Rating
AllMusic	4/5 stars

Side Three is the fifteenth solo album by Adrian Belew, released in 2006. It is the third installment of Belew's four-album series, each titled "Side" and their installment number in the series.

The album features contributions from various other musicians including Tool's Danny Carey on drums, Primus' Les Claypool on bass guitar and a single guest appearance by Belew's (at the time) King Crimson bandmate Robert Fripp.

== Track listing ==
All songs written by Adrian Belew.

1. "Troubles" – 3:14
2. "Incompetence Indifference" – 5:02
3. "Water Turns to Wine" – 3:47
4. "Crunk" – 1:17
5. "Drive" – 3:27
6. "Cinemusic" – 1:37
7. "Whatever" – 3:18
8. "Men in Helicopters v4.0" – 3:07
9. "Beat Box Car" – 4:30
10. "Truth Is" – 1:34
11. "The Red Bull Rides a Boomerang Across the Blue Constellation" – 4:34
12. "&" – 3:18

== Personnel ==
=== Musicians ===
- Adrian Belew – vocals, guitar, instrumentation
- Robert Fripp – flute, guitar (track 3)
- Les Claypool – bass (tracks 7–8)
- Danny Carey – drums (tracks 7–8)
- Mel Collins – saxophone (track 9), flute (track 10)
- The Prophet Omega – voice (track 1)
- Martha Belew – telephone message (track 2)

=== Technical ===
- Adrian Belew – producer, artwork
- Ken Latchney – engineer
- Andrew Mendelson – mastering
- Julie Rust – layout
- Mark Coleman – photography
