= The Acoustic Adrian Belew =

Studio album by Adrian Belew
- Released: 1993
- Genre: Rock
- Length: 29:20
- Label: DGM
- Producer: Adrian Belew

Adrian Belew chronology
Inner Revolution (1992)	The Acoustic Adrian Belew (1993)	Here (1994)

Professional ratings
Review scores
Source	Rating
Allmusic	4/5 stars

The Acoustic Adrian Belew is the seventh solo album by Adrian Belew, released in 1993. While Belew is predominantly known as an experimental electric guitarist who typically utilizes electronic effects, this album was an effort to feature his skills as a solo performer/songwriter/interpreter. Belew plays all the songs on acoustic guitar (with very minimal overdubs). At under 30 minutes, it is Adrian Belew's shortest album.

The album features new versions of songs from Belew's past (including 'Matte Kudasai', which he originally recorded with King Crimson), and two cover versions (a Beatles song, and a Roy Orbison tune). Of the four new songs on the record, both 'Burned By the Fire We Make' and 'Dream Life' would appear in full electric versions on Belew's next album Here the following year; 'Peace On Earth' is a rearrangement of 'Tango Zebra' (from Belew's 1986 instrumental album Desire Caught By the Tail) with new lyrics; and 'Martha Adored' is a tape-reversed presentation of an earlier album track ('Dream Life'), with additional overdubs.

== Track listing ==
1. "The Lone Rhinoceros" (Belew) – 2:37
2. "Peace on Earth" (Belew) – 2:49
3. "The Man in the Moon" (Belew) – 2:12
4. "The Rail Song" (Belew) – 3:42
5. "If I Fell" (Lennon–McCartney) – 2:18
6. "Burned by the Fire We Make" (Belew) – 2:50
7. "Matte Kudasai" (Belew, Bill Bruford, Robert Fripp, Tony Levin) – 2:18
8. "Dream Life" (Belew) – 2:19
9. "Old Fat Cadillac" (Belew) – 3:12
10. "Crying" (Roy Orbison, Joe Melson) – 2:39
11. "Martha Adored" (Belew) – 2:19

== Personnel ==
=== Musician ===
- Adrian Belew – acoustic guitar, vocals

=== Technical ===
- Adrian Belew – producer
- Noah Evens – engineer
