= Adrian Belew =

American musician, songwriter, and record producer (born 1949)

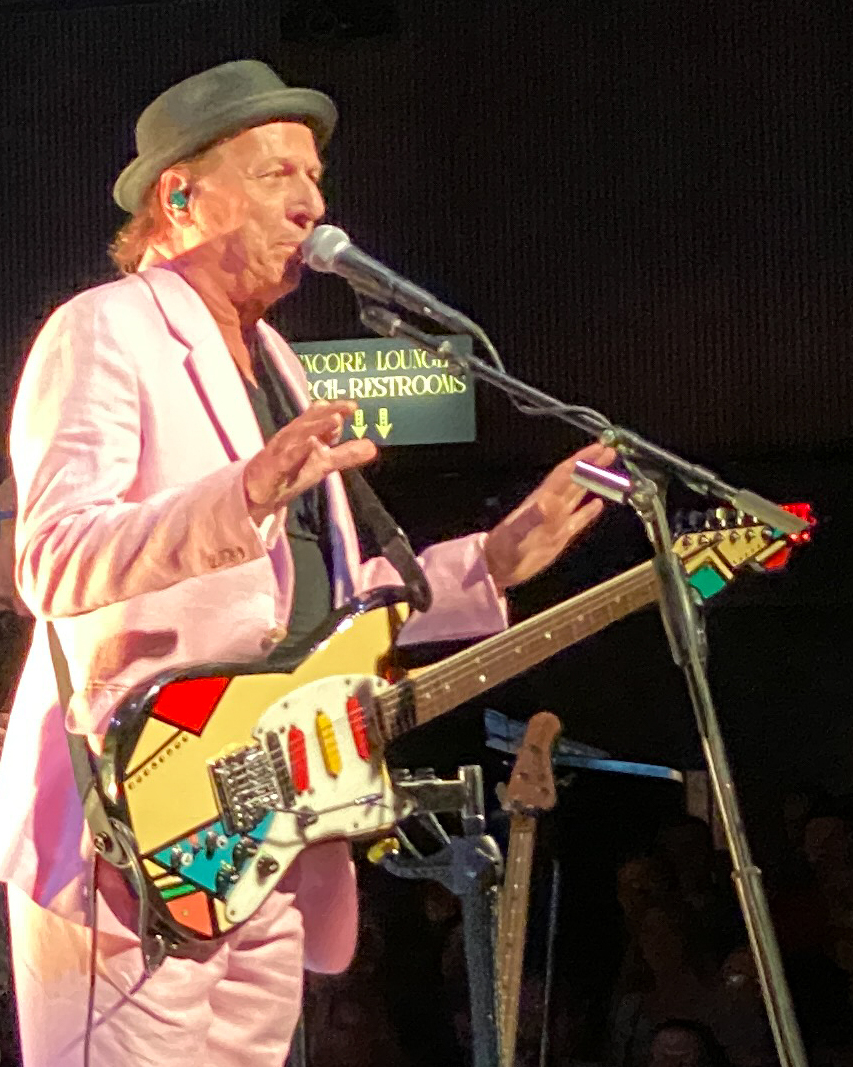
- Belew in 2024

Background information
- Born: Robert Steven Belew; December 23, 1949 (age 76); Covington, Kentucky, U.S.
- Genres: Progressive rock; industrial rock; experimental rock; new wave
- Occupations: Musician; singer; songwriter; record producer
- Instruments: Guitar; vocals; drums
- Years active: 1977–present
- Labels: Island; Atlantic; Caroline; Virgin
- Member of: Gizmodrome; Beat
- Formerly of: King Crimson; Tom Tom Club; the Bears
- Website: adrianbelew.net

Robert Steven "Adrian" Belew (born December 23, 1949) is an American musician, singer, songwriter, and record producer. A multi-instrumentalist primarily known as a guitarist and singer, he is noted for his unusual approach to the instrument, his playing cited as fluid, expressive, and often resembling "animal noises or mechanical rumblings".

Widely recognized as an "incredibly versatile [guitar] player", Belew is perhaps best known for his tenure as guitarist and frontman in the progressive rock group King Crimson between 1981 and 2009, and became the band's longest-tenure frontman. He has also released nearly twenty solo albums for Island Records and Atlantic Records in various styles. In addition, Belew has been a member of the intermittently active band the Bears, and fronted GaGa in the late 1970s and early 1980s.

Belew has also worked extensively as a session, guest, and touring musician, including periods with Frank Zappa, David Bowie, Talking Heads, Laurie Anderson, and Nine Inch Nails, as well as contributing to hit singles by Paul Simon, Tom Tom Club, and others. His 1989 solo single "Oh Daddy" charted on the US Billboard Hot 100 and his 2005 single "Beat Box Guitar" was nominated for a Grammy Award for Best Rock Instrumental Performance. Belew has also worked in instrument design and multimedia, collaborating with Parker Guitars to help design his Parker Fly signature guitar, and designing two iOS mobile apps.

== Biography ==
=== Early life (1949–1977) ===
Robert Steven Belew was born into a middle-class family in Covington, Kentucky, on December 23, 1949. Initially known to friends and classmates as "Steve", he played drums in his adolescence, playing with the Ludlow High School marching band and later with the high school cover band the Denems. Inspired by Jimi Hendrix, he took up guitar while bedridden with mononucleosis. At the age of 17, he was further inspired after witnessing a live performance by Lonnie Mack, who later became a close friend.

Not inclined to formal music study, Belew primarily taught himself guitar by listening to records. He was not aware of the studio sound manipulation used to create particular guitar lines, and so found ways of replicating them himself manually using unusual playing techniques and effects pedals. While maturing as a player and mastering various playing styles, Belew became increasingly preoccupied with ways to avoid "sounding like everybody else". He eventually found his own sound and style by learning how to make his guitar mimic sound effects such as car horns, animal noises, or industrial sounds.

In the mid-1970s, Belew began using the first name "Adrian" and moved to Nashville to pursue a full-time career as a professional musician. By 1977, he was playing with the regionally popular cover band Sweetheart, but wondered whether he had missed his chance to make a living with original music.

=== Work with Frank Zappa (1977–1978) ===
In 1977, while playing with Sweetheart at Fanny's Bar in Nashville, Belew was discovered by Frank Zappa, who had been tipped off regarding the band's talents by his chauffeur. Zappa approached Belew and discussed auditioning him for an upcoming tour, although Belew did not receive an official invitation to audition for the better part of a year. During this time Sweetheart split up. Once the formal invitation came, Belew flew out to Los Angeles and found himself auditioning alongside more formally trained musicians. Believing that he had performed poorly, Belew persuaded Zappa to give him a second audition, a more intimate experience which took place in Zappa's living room. Zappa was impressed enough to hire Belew as a guitarist and vocalist for a year.

Belew toured with Zappa in 1977 and 1978, and appeared on Zappa's 1979 album Sheik Yerbouti and concert film Baby Snakes. While with Zappa, Belew was mostly credited as a rhythm guitarist, although he also played lead, melody, or noise lines, and sang lead vocals on the songs "Jones Crusher" and "City of Tiny Lites". According to Belew, "Frank either played or sang, never both at the same time, so ultimately my role became covering his parts. When he sang I played his guitar part. When he played I sang his vocal part." He also took on the role of band clown, performing impressions (such as the Bob Dylan impersonation on the song "Flakes"), wearing unusual clothing, and performing visual stunts. ("Need someone to wear a flashing helmet and bounce around like a robot? How about Adrian? Need someone to wear a dress onstage? There's always Adrian.")

Belew has described his year in Zappa's band as a "crash course" in music theory, due to Zappa's rigorous rehearsals and often technically demanding music; he has stated that he "went to the Frank Zappa School of Rock."

=== Work with David Bowie (1978–1979) ===
On the recommendation of Brian Eno, David Bowie approached Belew after a Zappa concert in Berlin with an offer to hire him as a member of his touring band. Belew accepted the offer, as Zappa intended to spend the next four months editing Baby Snakes. Belew served as lead guitarist and backing vocalist on Bowie's Isolar II world tour in 1978, as documented on the live album Stage, and also contributed to Bowie's 1979 studio album Lodger. Twelve years later, he returned to working with Bowie, acting as musical director on his 1990 Sound+Vision Tour.

=== Talking Heads, GaGa and the Tom Tom Club (1979–1982) ===
In 1980, Belew formed a new band, GaGa, for which he served as the singer, guitarist, drummer, and primary songwriter. By now a frequent visitor to New York City, Belew had also befriended the New York-based new wave band Talking Heads. After being invited to join the band onstage for a performance of "Psycho Killer", he became an occasional guest performer at their concerts. Around this time, Belew also met King Crimson guitarist Robert Fripp at a Steve Reich concert. In July of that year, GaGa was invited to open several New York City-area concerts for Fripp's band the League of Gentlemen.

Talking Heads and Brian Eno subsequently hired Belew to add guitar solos and vocals to several tracks on their 1980 album Remain in Light. He then joined an expanded nine-piece Talking Heads live band which toured in 1980 and 1981. These concerts were documented on the second disc of the band's 1982 live double album The Name of This Band Is Talking Heads. Belew also played on Talking Heads member Jerry Harrison's solo album The Red and the Black and frontman David Byrne's The Catherine Wheel.

At this time, the internal relationships in Talking Heads were becoming strained. The band's rhythm section, Tina Weymouth and Chris Frantz, allegedly approached Belew with the suggestion that he should replace Byrne as the band's frontman, an offer which Belew immediately but politely turned down. (In his book Remain in Love, Frantz denied that this offer was ever made.) Belew did, however, go on to work with Weymouth and Frantz in Tom Tom Club. Joining them for recordings at Compass Point Studios in Nassau, Bahamas, Belew played guitar on the sessions for the band's self-titled debut album, including the hit single "Genius of Love". However, recording engineer Steven Stanley erased the majority of Belew's solos during the mixing sessions, and Weymouth stopped talking to Belew after he asked to receive songwriting credits on the album. Belew did not play live with Tom Tom Club or contribute to any further recordings, and instead focused on other projects.

=== Beginning of solo career (1981) ===
Belew's rising profile gained him a solo record contract with Island Records. During the recording of the debut Tom Tom Club album, members of GaGa joined Belew at Compass Point and backed him on a set of parallel sessions which would result in Belew's first solo album, Lone Rhino (1982). The album provided a home for GaGa material and blended various elements of Belew's work over the past decade. It also included an instrumental duet between Belew and his four-year-old daughter Audie on piano.

=== King Crimson (1981–2009) ===
Adrian Belew was the frontman, second guitarist, and occasional drummer for King Crimson from 1981 to 2009, one of the longest tenures in King Crimson by any member other than bassist Tony Levin and co-founder, bandleader, and sole constant member Robert Fripp. He maintained this position despite several splits or hiatuses in group activity, notwithstanding a brief period in the early 1990s when Fripp unsuccessfully asked singer David Sylvian of Japan to front a new version of the band.

Belew's involvement with King Crimson began while he was still involved with Talking Heads. Having been impressed by Belew's work with GaGa and David Bowie, Fripp asked him to join a new four-piece band, at that time called Discipline. While Belew was busy with Talking Heads and associated side projects at the time, he chose to leave and join Fripp's band due to the deteriorating relationships within Talking Heads. One of his conditions for joining the new band was that he would be allowed to continue his solo career, to which Fripp agreed.

Former King Crimson and Yes drummer Bill Bruford and New York session bassist and Chapman Stick player Tony Levin completed the Discipline lineup. During initial touring, the members of the band discussed the possibility of renaming themselves King Crimson, which they ultimately agreed to. This made Belew the first guitarist to formally play alongside Fripp within King Crimson on an equal footing (although Ian McDonald and John Wetton had occasionally contributed extra guitar to previous King Crimson recordings). He was also the first King Crimson singer to write most of his own lyrics.

The renamed band released and toured the album Discipline later in 1981. The follow-up, 1982's Beat, proved harder to record. Finding himself responsible for the bulk of the band's songwriting and dealing with the extra pressures of being the frontman in a high-level group, Belew argued with Fripp over the group's approach and sound. Disagreements were mostly resolved and the band continued to find success as a live act. However, writing and recording 1984's Three of a Perfect Pair proved yet more difficult, and Fripp opted to split the band following the conclusion of the Three of a Perfect Pair tour later that year.

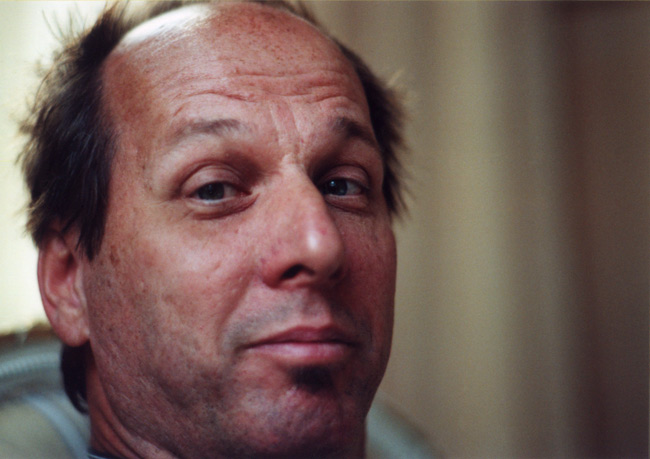
Belew in 2000

Despite these tensions, the members of this King Crimson incarnation maintained enough camaraderie and mutual respect to reunite in 1994, forming a sextet with the addition of drummer Pat Mastelotto and Warr guitarist Trey Gunn. This lineup toured successfully until 1997, releasing the 1995 album Thrak and several live recordings. From 1997 onward, Belew participated in several of the ProjeKcts, a series of King Crimson side projects active during the band's hiatuses, in which he predominantly played electronic drums.

King Crimson was then reduced to a quartet with the departures of Bruford and Levin, subsequently releasing the albums The ConstruKction of Light (2000) and The Power to Believe (2003). After a further four-year hiatus, the band returned to active work in 2008 as a five-piece, with Levin returning to replace Gunn and Porcupine Tree drummer Gavin Harrison joining. From 2000 through 2008, King Crimson used Belew's home studio in Mount Juliet, Tennessee, as a rehearsal space and studio.

In September 2013, Fripp announced the formation of a new King Crimson lineup which did not include Belew.

=== Solo career, part two (1983–1986) ===
Following the release of his first solo album Lone Rhino in 1982, Belew recorded a 1983 follow-up called Twang Bar King, which once again featured GaGa as backing band (now augmented by former Elvis Presley drummer Larrie Londin).

His next solo album was recorded in 1986, and was an experimental all-instrumental album of processed guitar, guitar synthesizer, and percussion called Desire Caught By the Tail. According to Belew, this album cost him his contract with Island Records due to its highly experimental nature.

From 1986 to 1989, Belew's solo career was on hold while he concentrated on the Bears.

=== The Bears (1985–1989, 1997–present) ===
Following King Crimson's breakup/entry into hiatus in 1984, Belew formed the Bears with fellow guitarist and singer Rob Fetters, drummer Chris Arduser, and bass guitarist Bob Nyswonger. All three were close friends of Belew whom he had met during his Sweetheart days in the mid-1970s, and were also ex-members of the Raisins, a Cincinnati-based band that had some local success in the early 1980s and had an album produced by Belew.

As a band, the Bears was a conscious attempt to create a more unified and collective group, with Belew and Fetters sharing lead vocal duties. Although Belew's guitar skills were still in evidence, they took second place to the band's commitment to songs. Signing to the I.R.S. Records subsidiary Primitive Man Recording Company, the Bears recorded and released two albums, 1987's The Bears, and 1988's Rise and Shine. After three years of constant recording, promotion, and touring, the band broke up in 1989 following the collapse of PMRC. The success of Belew's solo hit single "Oh Daddy" led to him touring with David Bowie. The remaining three Bears regrouped as psychodots.

All four musicians remained friends, stayed in contact with each other, and continued to help each other. Arduser drummed on Belew's 1992 solo album, Inner Revolution (with Fetters joining the 1992 touring band). On the tour supporting Belew's Here album in 1994, psychodots played as both the opening act and as Belew's backing band. Belew would also co-write two songs on Rob Fetters' Lefty Loose – Righty Tight album in 1998.

Starting in 1997, the Bears regularly reunited in the studio for intermittent recording sessions. This resulted in two further albums, 2001's Car Caught Fire, and 2007's Eureka. The band performed short tours to promote these releases, and continued to work together around its members varied schedules. Drummer Chris Arduser died on September 27, 2023.

=== Solo career, part three (1989–present) ===
Belew revived his solo career with 1989's Mr. Music Head, on which he played virtually all the instruments (with the exception of double bass). The album was split between relatively straightforward pop and more experimental songs, with a strong emphasis on Belew's signature electric tones, plus plenty of percussion and an unusual approach to acoustic production. Mr. Music Head also generated a hit single (No. 5 on the US Modern Rock chart) in the shape of "Oh Daddy", on which Belew duetted with his 11-year-old daughter Audie.

In 1990, Belew produced a similar follow-up with Young Lions. This featured a number of cover versions, plus two guest appearances by his past and current employer David Bowie, who'd hired Belew as musical director for his then-current Sound+Vision Tour. The album generated another US Modern rock chart hit (No. 2) with the Belew-and-Bowie duet "Pretty Pink Rose", and a minor hit on the same chart with the subsequent single, "Men In Helicopters" (No. 17).

The following year, Belew released Desire of the Rhino King, a compilation of digitally remastered material from his first three (now out-of-print) albums.

The next phase in Belew's career saw him pursuing a more traditional singing and songwriting style (albeit with his trademark unusual guitar tones), which owed a lot to his old heroes the Beatles. 1992's Inner Revolution, and 1994's Here (as well as 1993's self-explanatory and back-catalogue-revisiting The Acoustic Adrian Belew) were all heavily song-oriented and accessible, but sold less than Belew expected. 1996's Op Zop Too Wah blended Belew's songwriting approach with more avant-garde instrumental parts.

In parallel to Belew's work with a revived King Crimson, he released the first in a proposed Experimental Guitar Series, The Guitar as Orchestra: Experimental Guitar Series, Vol. 1, in 1997. This was an album of atonal contemporary classical music entirely realized on MIDI guitar using digital models of orchestral instruments. Belew has mentioned plans for releasing more records in the Experimental Guitar series, including one called The Animal Kingdom, but no more yet have been released.

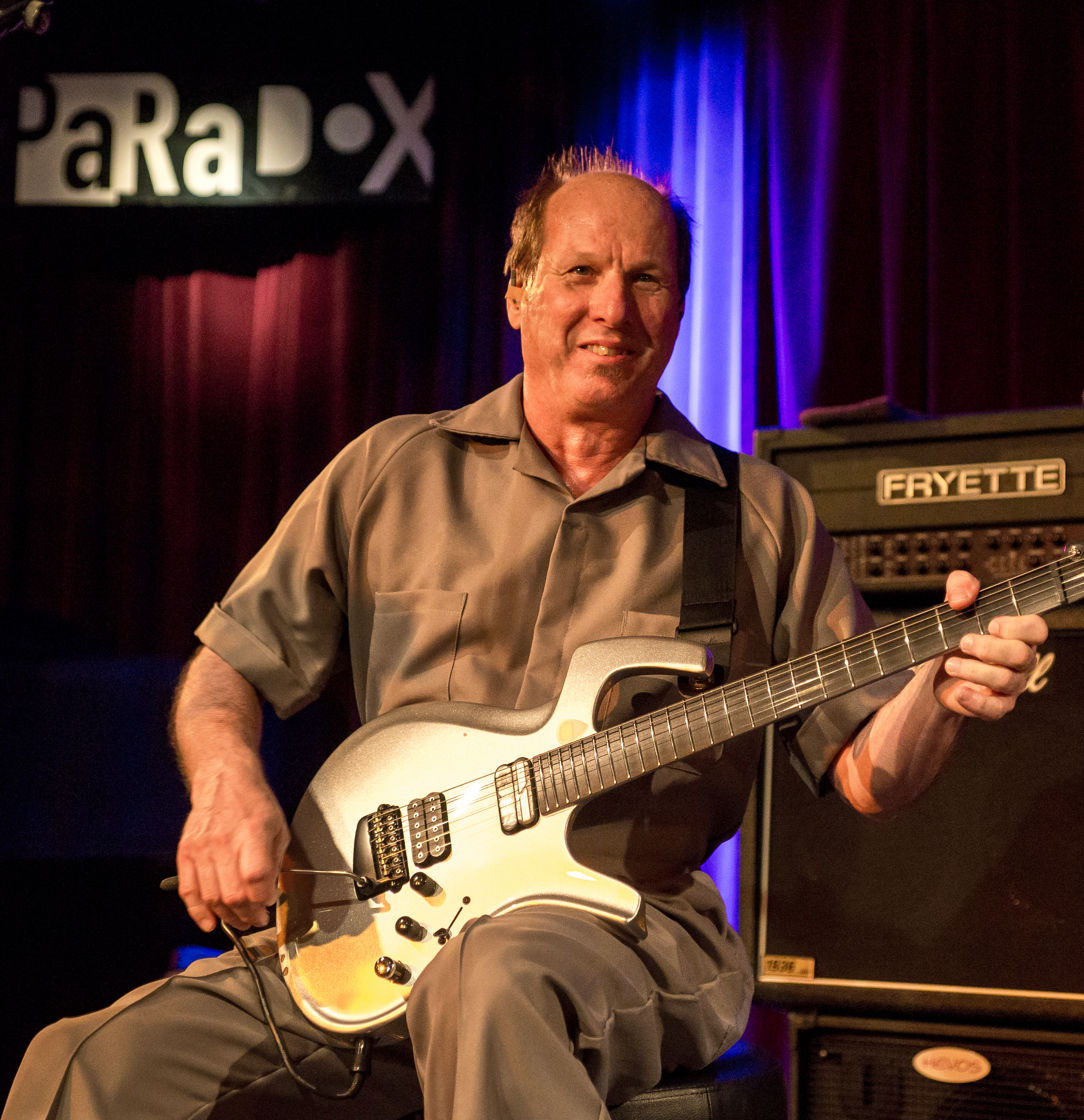
Belew live in 2016

Belew's subsequent releases were two more acoustic albums, 1998's Belew Prints: The Acoustic Adrian Belew, Vol. 2, and the 1999 Salad Days compilation, as well as the Coming Attractions album of works-in-progress. In 2004, he collaborated on a spoken-word-and-instrumentation album with Kevin Max, called Raven Songs 101. Between 2005 and 2007, Belew released the Side series of albums: 2005's Side One and Side Two, 2006's Side Three, and 2007's Side Four, with a variety of guest performers, including Tool's Danny Carey and Primus' Les Claypool.

In April and May 2006, Adrian toured Australia with local musicians John Prior from Matt Finish playing drums, and Al Slavik playing bass guitar and Stick (as well as singing backing vocals). In August 2006, he performed in Atlanta, Georgia, on The Acoustic Planet Tour with Bela Fleck & the Flecktones and Umphrey's McGee.

Later in 2006, Belew formed a new long-term trio, which his fans rapidly christened the Adrian Belew Power Trio, featuring former Paul Green School of Rock students Eric Slick on drums and Julie Slick on bass. This band featured on the 2007 live recording Side Four and the 2009 download-only Live Overseas.

In 2008, Belew played at the Adelaide Guitar Festival. In June 2009, the Adrian Belew Power Trio released an all-new studio record titled simply e., featuring a five-part long-form Belew instrumental composition. During the same month, Belew released A Cup of Coffee and a Slice of Time, an album credited to "Clay & Belew". This was an album of improvised classical-based interpretations of Belew songs (both solo and from King Crimson) mostly performed by pianist Michael Clay, with additional guitar, cello, and music concrete contributions from Belew.

Belew has been a frequent collaborator of Nine Inch Nails, appearing on the albums The Downward Spiral, The Fragile, Ghosts I–IV, and Hesitation Marks. Bandleader Trent Reznor briefly named Belew as the group's touring guitarist in 2013, but he ultimately left the group before playing any live dates.

On January 16, 2019, Belew announced an expansion of his "Power Trio" to a quartet with the addition of Saul Zonana and a 2019 tour.

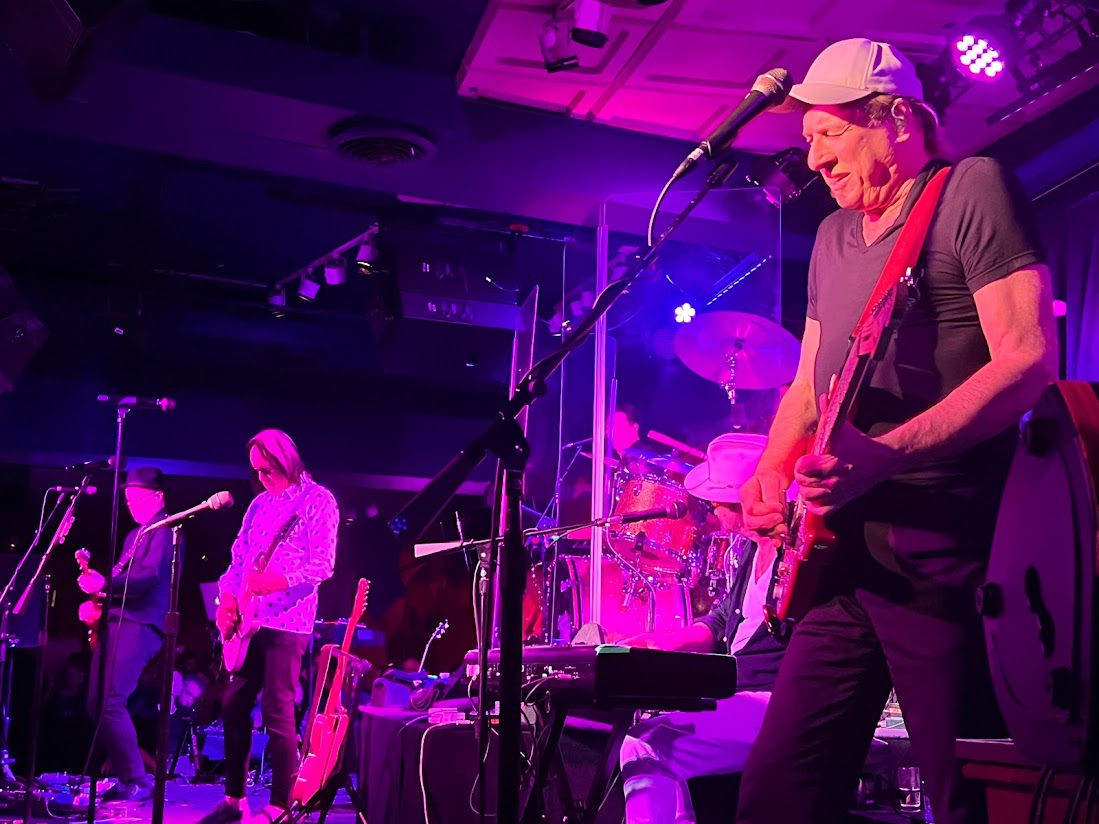
Belew in 2022, performing with Todd Rundgren on the "Celebrating David Bowie" tour

In 2022, Belew participated in the "Celebrating David Bowie" tour, featuring Angelo Moore, Todd Rundgren, and others.

In 2023, Belew joined Jerry Harrison of Talking Heads on the Remain In Light tour, which featured music from the Talking Heads album Remain in Light.

In 2024, Belew began a tour with Tony Levin, Steve Vai, and Tool drummer Danny Carey as Beat, performing music by the 1980s incarnation of King Crimson.

=== FLUX apps ===
Most recently, Belew has moved into working with mobile app platforms via his self-designed iOS apps FLUX:FX – the professional audio multi-effects app and FLUX by belew, which contain over three hundred audio tracks and pieces of artwork that he describes as "never playing the same twice". FLUX:FX is a real-time audio manipulation app for the iPad that he said "lets me make sounds that I can't get with any other gear." Both apps have gathered significant industry recognition, including being honored twice in the 2015 Webby Awards and receiving a 'best of the best' at the 2015 Red Dot Design Awards.

== Musical style ==
Although he has frequently worked as a lead singer, Belew is primarily known as a guitarist noted for his experimental playing style, which incorporates unconventional sonic effects, guitar synthesis and sound impressions of animals, birds, insects, vehicles, and mechanical noise.

Belew's playing style involves extended techniques such as tapping, pick scrapes, bending the neck, unorthodox styles of slide guitar, and occasional employment of objects such as files to attack the strings. In his riffs, he generally includes fret intonation work, and is even known to produce sounds from off the fretboard, including the stringed portion of the nut and bridge. He also makes extensive use of the vibrato arm.

Belew uses a wide variety of heavily synthesized and electronically altered guitar tones. Over the years he has become known for playing various guitars processed through an immense array of electronic effects devices ("I'm surrounded by guitar pedals, though. I can't step out the ring I'm surrounded in without stepping on a pedal," he told Adelaide.now in 2008.) He has also stated that he composes specifically for certain amps and effects. Lamenting the demise of one specific amplifier made by now-defunct Johnson Amplification, he said, "I wrote specific sounds and types of looping and things that I just can't seem to make other amps do." While he has used many brands of effects pedals, Electro Harmonix was one of his mainstays.

Belew is a pioneer of guitar synthesizers, having been one of the first players to bring them to, and consistently use them in, popular music. In the late 1970s and early 1980s, he was a user of the Roland GR-300 (alongside Andy Summers, Pat Metheny, and Robert Fripp). In the late 1980s and the 1990s, he used the Roland GR-1. He now favors the Line 6 Variax digital modelling system. In the early 1980s, Belew was notable for owning and using a rare Roland GR-505 fretless guitar synthesizer.

Belew's first guitar was a Gibson Firebird that he bought for $170. Belew now has a signature Parker Fly guitar, the company's first.

Belew has also been seen playing an extraordinarily flexible rubber-neck guitar in the Laurie Anderson film Home of the Brave and in the video for his 1989 single "Oh Daddy". In 2007, he revealed that the guitar's neck was rubber containing "metal vertebrae" and that it was solely a visual (and unplayable) prop.

Belew's singing voice is often compared to that of Talking Heads' David Byrne. In addition to his singing and guitar playing talents, Belew is an accomplished drummer and percussionist, and also plays bass guitar, upright bass, keyboards, and cello.

Belew has cited Jimi Hendrix, the Beatles, Jeff Beck, Igor Stravinsky, and George Gershwin as particular influences. He has also cited comedian Spike Jones as an influence on the absurdist humor of his lyrics.

=== Equipment setup ===
In 2010, Guitar Geek interviewed Belew's guitar technician André Cholmondeley, creating a list and diagram of Belew's guitar setup at the time.

An instructional video from 1984 shows he also used an A/DA Flanger, an Electro-Harmonix Octave Multiplexer, an Electro-Harmonix 16 Second Digital Delay, an Electro-Harmonix Frequency Analyzer, two Foxx Tone Machine Fuzzes, a Boss DM-2 Delay, an Electro-Harmonix Micro Synthesizer, an MXR Dyna Comp, a Pitch-Voltage Synthesizer, three Boss volume pedals, two MXR 10-band graphic equalizers, a Roland GR-300 Guitar Synthesizer, a Boss pedal switcher, an Electro-Harmonix Big Muff, an Electro-Harmonix Foot Controller, a tape loop machine, and an Electro-Harmonix Stereo Polychorus.

Belew is always adjusting his live setup, and according to audio engineer Daniel Rowland, he uses a Fractal Audio Axe-FX II, Liquid Foot 12+ controller, Roland VG-99, Kemper Profiler, a Keeley Compressor pedal, Ableton Live (running on an Apple Macbook), Soundblox Multi-wave distortion, DigiTech HarmonyMan, iConnectMidi 4+, MOTU Ultralite 3 hybrid, Keith Mcmillen Instruments Softstep 2, and his own NOIISE FLUX:FX iPad app through the Bose L1 and Atomic monitoring wedges. This was the rig seen by fans on his 2019 tour.

== Legacy ==
Many artists have expressed their admiration for Belew or have cited him as an influence, including Adam Jones of Tool, Steven Wilson, Henry Rollins, Red Hot Chili Peppers guitarists Hillel Slovak and John Frusciante,St. Vincent, Anneke van Giersbergen of the Gathering, Garry Roberts of the Boomtown Rats, William Rees of Mystery Jets, Nick Reinhart of Tera Melos, Josh Christian of Toxik, and Sean Worrell of Nero di Marte. In a 1994 interview with Guitar Player magazine, Trent Reznor described Belew as "the most awesome musician in the world".

== Session credits and other work ==
Belew is well regarded for his contributions, particularly on guitar, to various other artists' recordings.

In the 1980s, following his work with Talking Heads, Belew became an in-demand session player. Among the albums he contributed to during this period were Ryuichi Sakamoto's Left-handed Dream in 1981, Joan Armatrading's The Key in 1983, Peter Wolf's Lights Out and Jean Michel Jarre's Zoolook (both in 1984), Cyndi Lauper's True Colors and Paul Simon's Graceland (both in 1986), and Mike Oldfield's Earth Moving in 1989. During the mid-1980s, he frequently worked with Laurie Anderson, appearing on 1983's Mister Heartbreak album and her subsequent concert film, Home of the Brave. In his 1984 instructional video Electronic Guitar, Belew explained and demonstrated the technology and techniques used to create some of his signature music.

In 1993, Belew played "synthesized guitar" on the song "God Shuffled His Feet" by Crash Test Dummies and also contributed to Sara Hickman's Necessary Angels album. In 1994, he established himself as Trent Reznor's guest guitarist of choice, contributing to four Nine Inch Nails albums over the next nineteen years (The Downward Spiral, The Fragile, Ghosts I–IV, and Hesitation Marks). He worked again with Laurie Anderson on her 1994 album, Bright Red. During the 2000s, Belew was prominently featured on Tori Amos's 2001 album of cover versions, Strange Little Girls, and played on William Shatner's second musical album, Has Been, in 2004. In 2005, he featured as "primary guitarist" on the album Habitat by progressive rock band Man on Fire and contributed two solos to Porcupine Tree's album Deadwing. In 2006 and 2007, Belew contributed to two Pink Floyd tribute albums produced by Billy Sherwood: Back Against the Wall, and Return to the Dark Side of the Moon.

In 2016, Belew scored the Pixar short film Piper, which was shown before Finding Dory in theaters. He also featured on the album The News by Italian progressive/eclectic rock band N.y.X.

== Record production ==
In 1983, Belew produced the eponymous debut album for the Raisins. In 1985, he produced the Elvis Brothers' second album, Adventure Time.

During the 1990s, he began making more of a name for himself as a producer, most notably producing two tracks on Jars of Clay's debut album in 1995 (including the crossover Christian hit "Flood"), but also producing the Irresponsibles' 1999 album, When Pigs Fly.

Belew has also produced and played on albums by three Mexican rock bands: Caifanes's 1992 album, El silencio; Santa Sabina's 1994 album, Símbolos, and Jaguares' 2005 album, Cronicas de un Laberinto.

Belew was credited as co-producer and musician on Kevin Max's 2001 album, Stereotype Be.

Belew established a recording studio in his home in Williams Bay, Wisconsin in the early 1990s before relocating the studio, now named StudioBelew to the Nashville, Tennessee suburb of Mount Juliet in 1995.

== Instrument design ==
Belew has also worked in instrument design, collaborating with Parker Guitars to help design his own Parker Fly signature guitar. This guitar is noticeably different from the standard design, containing advanced electronics, such as a sustainer pickup and a Line 6 Variax guitar modelling system. It is also MIDI-capable, allowing it to be used with any synthesizer with MIDI connectivity.

== Discography ==
=== Studio albums ===
- Lone Rhino (1982, Island)
- Twang Bar King (1983, Island)
- Desire Caught By the Tail (1986, Island)
- Mr. Music Head (1989, Atlantic)
- Young Lions (1990, Atlantic)
- Inner Revolution (1992, Atlantic)
- The Acoustic Adrian Belew (1993, Adrian Belew Presents)
- Here (1994, Adrian Belew Presents)
- The Experimental Guitar Series Volume 1: The Guitar as Orchestra (1995, Adrian Belew Presents)
- Op Zop Too Wah (1996, Adrian Belew Presents)
- Belew Prints: The Acoustic Adrian Belew, Vol. 2 (1998, Adrian Belew Presents)
- Coming Attractions (2000, Thirsty Ear Recordings)
- Side One (2004, Adrian Belew Presents)
- Side Two (2005, Adrian Belew Presents)
- Side Three (2006, Adrian Belew Presents)
- e (2009, Adrian Belew Presents)
- Pop-Sided (2019, Adrian Belew Presents)
- Elevator (2022, Adrian Belew Presents)

=== Live albums ===
- Side Four (2007)
- Live At Rockpalast 2008 (2008) CD & DVD
- Live In Germany (2009)
- Live Overseas (2009) digital
- Adrian Belew's E For Orchestra: Live (2011) DVD

=== Compilations ===
- Desire of the Rhino King (1991, Island) – compilation derived from first three albums
- Salad Days (1999, Thirsty Ear) – a collection of acoustic recordings old and new
- Dust (2014, Adrian Belew Presents) – collection of demos and studio outtakes
- Idiom' on Classwar Karaoke 0031 Survey (2015)
- Sixteen (2015, Adrian Belew Presents)
- Twenty (2015, Adrian Belew Presents)
- A Toe in the Ocean (2024, Adrian Belew Presents)

=== Other releases ===
- with Kevin Max: Raven Songs 101 (2004)
- as Michael Clay & Adrian Belew: A Cup Of Coffee and a Slice of Time (2009)
- with the New Czars: Doomsday Revolution (2010)
- with Metropole Orchestra:Adrian Belew's e For Orchestra (2011, Adrian Belew Presents) studio recording CD
- FLUX Volume One (2016, Adrian Belew Presents), as part of the FLUX project
- FLUX Volume Two (2017, Adrian Belew Presents), as part of the FLUX project
- FLUX Volume Three (2018, Adrian Belew Presents), as part of the FLUX project

=== Contributions (selection) ===
with Frank Zappa

- 1979: Sheik Yerbouti ("Flakes", "Jones Crusher", "City of Tiny Lites")
- 1983: Baby Snakes Soundtrack
- 1992: You Can't Do That on Stage Anymore, Vol. 6 [2CD] ("The Poodle Lecture", "Is That Guy Kidding Or What?", "White Person", "Tryin' To Grow A Chin")
- 2006: Trance-Fusion ("Bowling On Charen", recorded Oct 28, 1977)
- 2008: One Shot Deal ("Heidelberg", recorded February 24, 1978)
- 2010: Hammersmith Odeon (recorded Jan–Feb 1978) [3CD]
- 2017: Halloween 77 (recorded Oct 28–31, 1977) [3CD]

with David Bowie

- 1978: Stage (recorded Apr–May 1978) [2CD]
- 1978: Welcome to the Blackout (Live London '78) (recorded 30 June-1 July 1978, released 21 April 2018) [2CD]
- 1979: Lodger ("Fantastic Voyage", "Move On", "Red Sails", "DJ", "Boys Keep Swinging", "Repetition", "Red Money")

with Talking Heads / Tom Tom Club / Jerry Harrison / David Byrne

- 1980: Remain in Light
- 1981: Tom Tom Club
- 1981: The Red and the Black
- 1981: The Catherine Wheel
- 1982: The Name of This Band Is Talking Heads
- 1990: Walk on Water

with King Crimson

- 1981: Discipline
- 1982: Beat
- 1984: Three of a Perfect Pair
- 1994: Vrooom EP
- 1995: Thrak
- 1996: Thrakattak
- 1998: Absent Lovers [Live in Montreal 1984]
- 2000: The ConstruKction Of Light
- 2001: Vrooom Vrooom
- 2002: Happy with What You Have to Be Happy With EP
- 2003: The Power to Believe

with Herbie Hancock

- 1981: Magic Windows

with Ryuichi Sakamoto

- 1981: Left-handed Dream
- 1990: The Arrangement
- 1994: Soundbytes

with Joe Cocker

- 1982: Sheffield Steel

with Jean Michel Jarre

- 1984: Zoolook

with Laurie Anderson

- 1984: Mister Heartbreak
- 1986: Home of the Brave (soundtrack)
- 1994: Bright Red

with Cyndi Lauper

- 1986: True Colors

with Paul Simon

- 1986: Graceland
- 1990: The Rhythm of the Saints

with the Bears

- 1987: The Bears
- 1988: Rise and Shine
- 2001: Car Caught Fire
- 2007: Eureka!

with Mike Oldfield

- 1989: Earth Moving

with Nine Inch Nails

- 1994: The Downward Spiral
- 1999: The Fragile
- 2008: Ghosts I–IV
- 2013: Hesitation Marks

with Sara Hickman

- 1998 Two Kinds of Laughter

with Béla Fleck & the Flecktones

- 2000: Outbound

with William Shatner

- 2004: Has Been

with Porcupine Tree

- 2005: Deadwing

with Tony Levin

- 2006: Resonator

with N.y.X

- 2016: The News

with Gizmodrome

- 2017: Gizmodrome
- 2021: Gizmodrome Live

with Turkuaz

- 2020: Ophidiophobia (single)
- 2022: Apollyon

with BEAT

- 2025: Live performances from the 2024–25 US tour

=== Singles ===
Year	Title	Chart positions				Album
Year	Title	US Hot 100	US Modern Rock	US Mainstream Rock	UK	Album
1989	"Oh Daddy"	58	5	–	–	Mr. Music Head
1990	"Pretty Pink Rose" (with David Bowie)	–	2	24	89	Young Lions
1990	"Men in Helicopters"	–	17	–	–	Young Lions
