= Lone Rhino =

Studio album by Adrian Belew
- Released: April 26, 1982
- Recorded: August–September 1981
- Studio: Compass Point, Nassau, Bahamas
- Genre: Pop rock, avant-garde
- Length: 36:34
- Label: Island
- Producer: Adrian Belew

Adrian Belew chronology
Lone Rhino (1982)	Twang Bar King (1983)

Professional ratings
Review scores
Source	Rating
AllMusic	4/5 stars

Lone Rhino is the debut solo album by American musician Adrian Belew, released on April 26, 1982. It features the musicians and much of the repertoire of Belew's pre-King Crimson band GaGa.

The album was recorded following years of Belew playing as lead guitarist for Frank Zappa, David Bowie, Talking Heads and Tom Tom Club, and seven months after his 1981 debut as the lead singer, lyricist, and second guitarist of King Crimson with Discipline. A video was produced for the track "Big Electric Cat", filmed in 1982 in New York City that opens with a shot of the World Trade Center.

The song "Animal Grace" was originally called "Buy That Face" and was written about David Bowie. Members of a Springfield, Illinois, high school band were enlisted to play the 7/8 coda on "Adidas in Heat". Belew's daughter Audie (four years old at the time) duets with her father on the last track, "The Final Rhino" (which was produced when Belew secretly recorded a piano piece improvised by Audie and then added a guitar line). She also coined the word "momur" which meant anything that frightened her (monster).

== Track listing ==
All tracks are written by Adrian Belew except where noted.

No.	Title	Writer(s)	Length
1.	"Big Electric Cat"		4:51
2.	"The Momur"		3:45
3.	"Stop It"		2:45
4.	"The Man in the Moon"		3:45
5.	"Naive Guitar"		4:05
6.	"Hot Sun"		1:29
7.	"The Lone Rhinoceros"		3:57
8.	"Swingline"		3:25
9.	"Adidas in Heat"		2:44
10.	"Animal Grace"		3:58
11.	"The Final Rhino"	Adrian Belew, Audie Belew	1:24

== Personnel ==
- Adrian Belew – guitars, drums, percussion, lead vocals, electronics

GaGa

- Christy Bley – acoustic piano, backing vocals
- Bill Janssen – alto and baritone saxophone, backing vocals
- J. Clifton Mayhugh – fretted and fretless bass guitars, backing vocals

Additional musician

- Audie Belew – acoustic piano on "The Final Rhino"

Technical

- Adrian Belew – producer
- Stan Hertzman – executive producer
- Gary "Plattski" Platt – engineer
- Rich Denhart – assistant engineer
- Benjamin Armbrister – recording
- Masayoshi Sukita – photography
