= Three of a Perfect Pair =

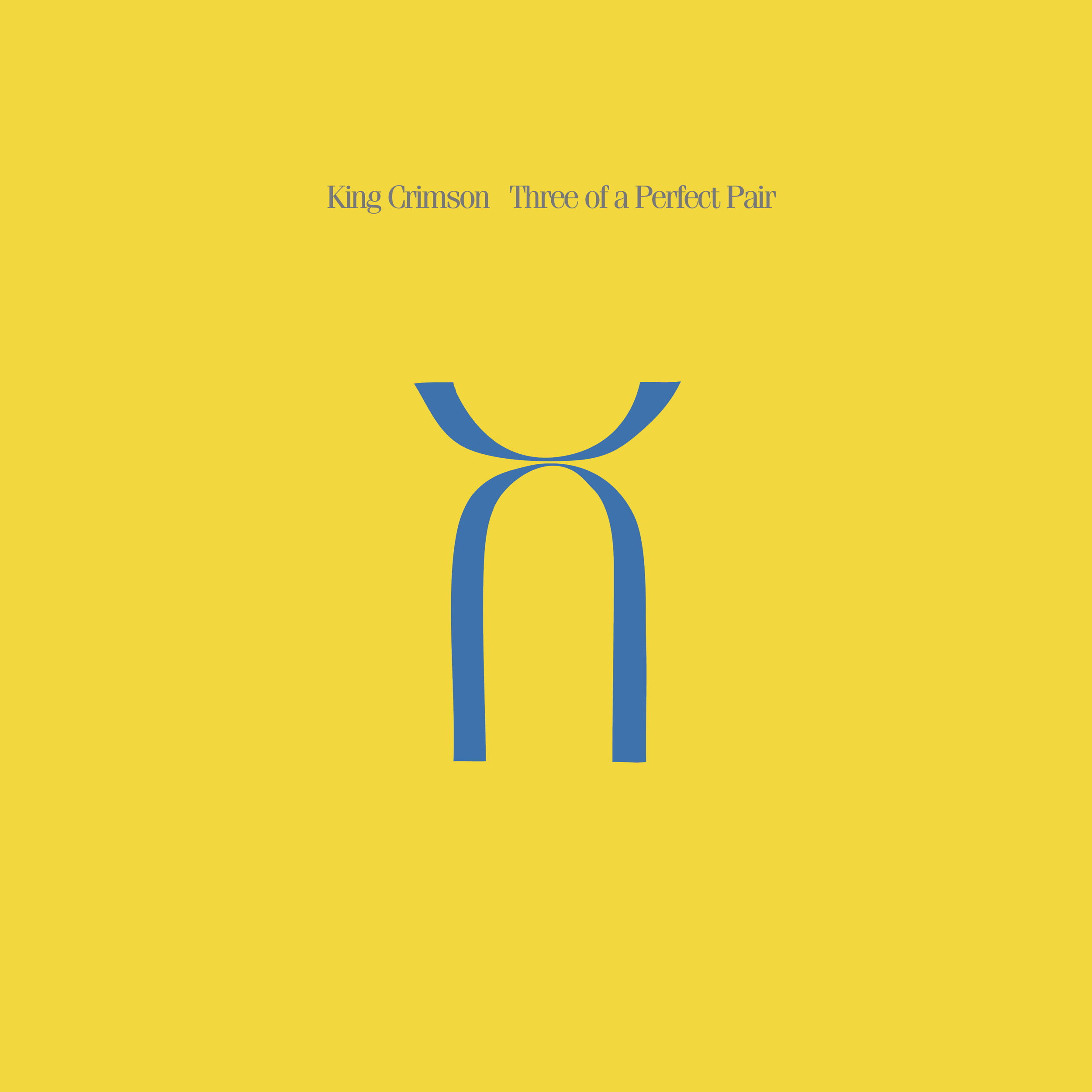

Studio album by King Crimson
- Released: 23 March 1984
- Recorded: May – November 1983
- Studios: Arny's Shack (Poole, Dorset); Marcus (London); Bearsville (Woodstock, New York)
- Genres: Progressive rock; new wave; post-punk; industrial
- Length: 41:15; 1:08:14 (2001 remaster)
- Labels: E.G.; Warner Bros.
- Producer: King Crimson

King Crimson chronology
Beat (1982)	Three of a Perfect Pair (1984)	The Compact King Crimson (1986)

King Crimson studio chronology
Beat (1982)	Three of a Perfect Pair (1984)	Thrak (1995)

Singles from Three of a Perfect Pair
- 1. "Sleepless" Released: 2 March 1984

Three of a Perfect Pair is the tenth studio album by the English progressive rock band King Crimson, released on 23 March 1984 by E.G. Records. It is the group's final studio album to feature the quartet of Adrian Belew, Robert Fripp, Tony Levin and Bill Bruford, which broke up later that year, though all four would appear in the sextet lineup featured on THRAK in 1995.

== Music ==
According to Robert Fripp, the album "presents two distinct sides of the band’s personality, which has caused at least as much confusion for the group as it has the public and the industry. The left side is accessible, the right side excessive."

The "other side" of bonus material on the 2001 CD remaster consists of two instrumental outtakes from the 1983 sessions, three alternate mixes of "Sleepless", and a 1989 a cappella recording (first published in the 1991 Frame by Frame box set) in which Tony Levin performs all parts of the barbershop quartet "The King Crimson Barber Shop".

American hip hop duo Gang Starr would sample "Dig Me" on "Words I Manifest (Remix)" from their 1989 debut album No More Mr. Nice Guy.

== Title and artwork ==
The title of the album is based on the idea of "perfect opposites", or someone's truth, someone else's truth, and an objective truth (the idea of "three sides to every story").

The Peter Willis designed artwork illustrates the sacred–profane dichotomy while being a simplified version of the Larks' Tongues in Aspic cover; a rising phallic object represents a male solar deity about to penetrate the crescent figure, a female lunar deity. According to Fripp, the artwork is "a presentation of a reconciliation of Western & Eastern Christianity...the front cover has the two elements, representing the male & female principles. The back cover has the third element drawing together & reconciling the preceding opposite terms".

== Release and reception ==
Professional ratings
Review scores
Source	Rating
AllMusic	3/5 stars
Robert Christgau	B−
Kerrang!	mixed
Rolling Stone	3/5 stars

Released in March 1984, Three of a Perfect Pair peaked at number 30 in the UK Albums Chart.

Trouser Press described it in a mixed review as "a most disjunct album from a band that prided itself on carefully matched contradictions. The Left Side sports four of Adrian Belew's poorer songs and a self-derivative instrumental; the flip is nearly all-instrumental, nearly free-form, nearly brilliant...apparently the Frippressive 'discipline' that forged the critically acclaimed pop/art synthesis of the first two latter-day Crimson albums is not a permanent condition."

A 5.1 surround sound mix of the album by Fripp and Steven Wilson was released in October 2016 for the band's 40th Anniversary Series as a standalone CD/DVD package and as part of the On (and off) The Road (1981–1984) box set.

== Track listing ==
All music written by Adrian Belew, Robert Fripp, Tony Levin and Bill Bruford; all lyrics written by Adrian Belew. "The King Crimson Barber Shop" music & lyrics by Tony Levin.

Side one (The Left Side)
No.	Title	Length
1.	"Three of a Perfect Pair"	4:13
2.	"Model Man"	3:49
3.	"Sleepless"	5:24
4.	"Man with an Open Heart"	3:05
5.	"Nuages (That Which Passes, Passes Like Clouds)" (instrumental)	4:47
Total length:		21:18

Side two (The Right Side)
No.	Title	Length
1.	"Industry" (instrumental)	7:04
2.	"Dig Me"	3:16
3.	"No Warning" (instrumental)	3:29
4.	"Larks' Tongues in Aspic (Part III)" (instrumental)	6:05
Total length:		19:54

2001 bonus tracks (The Other Side)
No.	Title	Length
10.	"The King Crimson Barber Shop"	1:37
11.	"Industrial Zone A" (instrumental)	1:44
12.	"Industrial Zone B" (instrumental)	4:33
13.	"Sleepless" (Tony Levin mix)	7:26
14.	"Sleepless" (Bob Clearmountain mix)	5:24
15.	"Sleepless" (Dance mix – F. Kevorkian)	6:18

== Personnel ==
King Crimson

- Adrian Belew – electric guitar, guitar synthesizer, fretless electric guitar, lead vocals
- Robert Fripp – electric guitar, guitar synthesizer, Frippertronics
- Tony Levin – bass guitar, Chapman Stick, synthesizer, backing vocals; lead and backing vocals (10)
- Bill Bruford – acoustic and electronic drums, percussion

Additional personnel

- Brad Davis – engineering
- Tony Arnold (Arny's Shack) – engineering (6, 7)
- Nick James, Ray Niznik, Peter Hefter – assistant engineers
- Tex Read – social services
- Peter Willis (Trevall Mill Studio) – cover symbol design basis
- Timothy Eames – cover art

== Charts ==
Chart (1984)	Peak position
Canada Top Albums/CDs (RPM)	43
German Albums (Offizielle Top 100)	58
Japanese Albums (Oricon)	37
UK Albums (Official Charts)	30
US Billboard 200	58
