= Android 18 =

Fictional character

- Dragon Ball character
- Android 18 as depicted in Dragon Ball Z: Resurrection 'F' (2015)
- First appearance: Dragon Ball chapter #349: "The Androids Awake!", November 12, 1991 (Weekly Shōnen Jump 1991)
- Created by: Akira Toriyama
- Voiced by: Japanese: Miki Itō; English: Meredith McCoy (Funimation); Colleen Clinkenbeard (Funimation, Dragon Ball Z Kai); Farrell Spence (Ocean Group, Cell Saga); Willow Johnson (Ocean Group, Buu Saga); Amber Lee Connors (Dragon Ball Z Abridged); Sharon Mann (AB Groupe); Tamara Ryan (Bang Zoom)

In-universe information
- Species: Cyborg
- Family: Android 17 (twin brother)
- Spouse: Krillin
- Children: Marron (daughter)
- Relatives: Dr. Gero (creator)
- Abilities: Super strength; Super speed, agility, reflexes; Stamina; Flight; Energy projection; Durability; Force Fields; Unlimited energy

Android 18 (Japanese: 人造人間18号, Hepburn: Jinzōningen Jūhachigō; lit. "Artificial Human #18"), born as Lazuli (ラズリ, Razuri) is a fictional character in the Dragon Ball series created by Akira Toriyama. Android 18 makes her debut in Chapter #349 "The Androids Awake!", first published in Weekly Shōnen Jump on November 12, 1991.

She and her twin brother, Android 17, were forcibly turned into cyborgs by Dr. Gero to serve his vendetta against Goku. The main-timeline version of the character has very little to no interest in fulfilling Gero's orders and becomes a major character in the series after marrying Goku's best friend Krillin.

In an alternate future timeline, Android 18 is a ruthless killer who started a reign of terror along with Android 17 over Earth that lasted for twenty years until they were both killed by adult Trunks.

== Creation and conception ==
Android 18, along with Android 17, was conceived after Akira Toriyama's former editor Kazuhiko Torishima expressed disapproval with Androids #19 and #20 as villains. Following their introduction into the series, Torishima soon afterward became dissatisfied with her and 17 as well, resulting in the creation of Cell. Toriyama stated that he was pleased with Android 18 because she was a type of girl he had not drawn before, and that he liked her slanted eyes. In 2014, he revealed her real name was Lazuli (ラズリ, Razuri).

Yūsuke Watanabe, who wrote the screenplay for the film Dragon Ball Z: Battle of Gods, had originally written the film to take place at Android 18 and Krillin's wedding, but Akira Toriyama wrote it to take place at Bulma's birthday party. Watanabe thought Toriyama made the change because he wanted fans to imagine the wedding for themselves. In promotional material for Battle of Gods, Toriyama drew her with purple hair.

=== Voice actors ===
In the Japanese version of the entire Dragon Ball anime series and subsequent related media, Android 18 is voiced by Miki Itō.

In English, Android 18 is voiced by Meredith McCoy in the Funimation dub of Dragon Ball Z and Dragon Ball GT except for Dragon Ball Z Kai, where she is voiced by Colleen Clinkenbeard. However, since Battle of Gods, McCoy has returned to the role. In the Ocean Group dub of the Cell arc, 18 was voiced by Farrell Spence, and later by Willow Johnson in the Buu arc. In Bang Zoom! dub, Android 18 is voiced by Tamara Ryan.

== Abilities ==
Despite being referred to as an Android, commonly regarded as such, Android 18 is a cyborg. Bulma stated while looking at 17's blueprint that he and 18 were human-based, but just about everything has been enhanced with bio-organic components. Her only mechanical parts are the emergency deactivation controller, a self-destruction device (removed), and a small perpetual energy reactor that provides her with inexhaustible energy and stamina.

Dragon Ball Super reaffirms this, with Gohan stating that the androids have been modified on a cellular level to be superhuman. Furthermore, Gero's experiments on her do not impede her ability to reproduce, as evidenced by her giving birth to a healthy daughter, Marron.

== Appearances ==
=== In Dragon Ball Z ===
Before their introductions and present in both timelines, Androids 17 and 18 were converted into androids by Dr. Gero with the intent of murdering Goku. In the main timeline, Android 18 is activated by Dr. Gero along with Android 17 after he returns to his laboratory following his unsuccessful attempt to defeat Goku's allies, the Z Fighters. After Gero is killed by Android 17, Android 18 activates Android 16 before surviving the following blast meant to kill her from Trunks, as the three begin their quest to find and kill Goku. When they encounter Vegeta, Android 18 decides to fight him and easily bests him in battle, receiving only damage to her clothing and breaking his arm. When Trunks, Tenshinhan and Piccolo become involved, she and Android 17 easily defeat the trio. Before leaving to continue her quest, she kisses Krillin on the cheek. The androids go to Goku's home and unsuccessfully discovering him there, leading them to journey to Master Roshi's house, but they never found him there either due to his departure unbeknownst to them after recovering form the heart virus. 18 watches Android 17's battle against Piccolo, at one point becoming impatient and offering her assistance to her brother's refusal, until Cell arrives, who reveals his intention to absorb the pair. Piccolo is dispatched by Cell and Android 17 is absorbed, Android 18 nearly being convinced to be absorbed as well by Cell's impersonation of Android 17 until he mistakenly mischaracterizes him. Androids 18 and 16 are given time to escape thanks to Tenshinhan holding Cell back. She and Android 16 hide on an island after this, where she refuses to leave his side and watches Vegeta's fight against Cell before Krillin approaches her with a remote to turn her off, but he destroys it, realizing his love for her, thus Android 18 is soon afterwards absorbed by Cell, who blinds everyone with Solar Flare (太陽拳, Taiyōken), allowing him to reach his final "Perfect" form. For the next ten days, until the Cell Games tournament that Cell sets up following his disillusionment with the strength of both Vegeta and Trunks, 18 remains trapped and unconscious inside of his body. However, a strong blow from Gohan causes him to regurgitate her. After Gohan defeats Cell, she is healed and declines Krillin's advances for the time-being, despite him using the Dragon Balls to have her self-destruct device removed.

In the timeline that Future Trunks comes from, 17 and 18 are mass murderers, whereas the main timeline versions of the pair never killed innocents. They are identical in appearance to the versions of the two in the present timeline, Android 18 wearing the ensemble she wore in the main timeline upon her activation by Dr. Gero. Within the months of their release, shortly after the death of Goku, they kill their timeline's versions of the Z Fighters (Piccolo, Vegeta, Krillin, Yamcha, Tien, and Yajirobe), with Gohan managing to escape. Several years later, they kill Gohan and then nearly kill Trunks three years later when he confronts the pair during one of their killing sprees. When Trunks returns from the past, now vastly stronger than he was in their previous encounter as a result of his training, she shows interest in finally ending his life after he confronts her and Android 17, but is killed by him instead.

Seven years later in the main timeline, she has married Krillin and has a daughter with him named Marron (マーロン, Māron). She convinces Krillin to participate in the 25th World Martial Arts Tournament for the money along with her. Thanks to a lack of interest in being exposed as super-powered, she disguises her strength in hitting the Punching Machine, hitting it lightly and thereby altering who she is matched to fight. During the competition, she competes against Goten and Trunks when the pair enter the competition as Mighty Mask (マイティマスク, Maiti Masuku), having stolen the identity of another competitor. After the duo reveal themselves by transforming into Super Saiyans, Android 18 wins the match by default, advancing to the next round against Mr. Satan, who she outclasses in strength, but throws the fight nonetheless after she secretly arranged to have the prize money shared with him so as not to ruin his reputation. After Majin Buu is released, thanks to the energy used by both Goku and Vegeta while the two fought, Android 18 joins the others in searching for the Dragon Balls to resurrect everyone killed by Vegeta and resides at Dende's while taking refuge. After Buu finds them the following day, kills the majority of people on Earth, and escapes the Hyperbolic Time Chamber, leaving Gotenks and Piccolo inside, Android 18 is killed alongside her daughter when they are simultaneously turned into chocolate, being eaten by him afterward. She is later brought back to life and gives energy to Goku's Genki-dama, successfully destroying Majin Buu. Ten years later, 18 is last seen attending another World Martial Arts Tournament.

=== In Dragon Ball Super ===
in the film Dragon Ball Z: Battle of Gods, Android 18 is present at Bulma's birthday party, attempting to fight Beerus following him being enraged by Boo taking his pudding, but being defeated with a single strike to the neck; in Dragon Ball Z: Resurrection 'F', she shaves Krillin's head before he goes off to fight a resurrected Frieza, being killed after Frieza destroys the planet but having her death undone when the timeline is reversed. After the events of the last two films, she informs Krillin of a supposed space picnic, leading to his investigation into the matter and she later travels off Earth to watch the tournament between the fighters from her universe and those of Universe 6. After Trunks returns from the future, he discovers Android 18 and Krillin's marriage, meeting 18 again and preparing to engage her before she greets him. Android 18 later wants to get a gift for Krillin and unsuccessfully tries using the Dragon Balls. Android 18 scolds Krillin for being injured by a bullet while he is reluctant to train with Goku, later citing her as a factor in his choice to resume training.

Android 18 and Krillin are approached by Goku and Gohan to join the Tournament of Power, 18 agreeing due to the 10 million Zeni reward and revealing Android 17's location. During the tournament, Android 18 chooses to fight on her own, defeating Universe 9's Sorrel, Universe 4's Shosa, and Universe 11's Tupper. Rozie and Ribrianne launch a combined attack at Goku that Androids 17 and 18 deflect, and the two then battle Rozie and Ribrianne. Android 18 knocks Ribrianne out of her transformation, and she reverts to Brianne, who catches Android 18 in an energy trap while her comrades from Universe 2 send their love to her and enable her to transform back into Ribrianne, but with an increase in size. Android 18 concedes that she is finished before hearing Krillin screaming her name from the sidelines and breaking through Ribrianne's trap. With assistance from Android 17, 18 blasts through Ribrianne's giant form and eliminates her. Universe 3's Paparoni and Koichiarator merge to form Anilaza, and Goku, Gohan, Vegeta, Frieza, 17, and 18 attempt to coordinate their attacks against the being. Anilaza attempts to eat 18 before Goku intervenes, and Anilaza corners Android 17 with a series of beams that lead him off the ledge of the arena. Android 18 jumps off and grabs him, telling him that the rest is up to him before kicking him back to the arena while descending to her own elimination. She apologizes to Universe 7 for being eliminated and tells Android 17 he better not lose.

Shortly after the Tournament of Power, 18, along with 17, helps the Z fighters fight off henchmen that Moro has sent to Earth. She, along with the other allies, lends Goku some of her power to finish off Moro once and for all. Years later, Android 18 is approached by Piccolo to follow him to the newly found Red Ribbon army base and along with Gohan, Piccolo, Krillin, Goten, and Trunks. There, she participates in the battle against Cell Max, a revamped version of Cell created by Dr. Gero's grandson, Dr. Hedo.

Android 18 appears in Dragon Ball Super: Super Hero alongside Krillin, to assist Gohan and company in countering the resurrected Red Ribbon Army.

=== In other media ===
Android 18 appears in two non-canonical Dragon Ball Z films; she briefly appears at the beginning of the seventh; In the eleventh, Android 18 tries to retrieve money from Mr. Satan that he owed her from their deal that she would lose the tournament so she would not publicly upstage him, later fighting against Bio-Broly along with Krillin, Goten, and Trunks, and saves civilians from being killed by him.

In a filler episode of Dragon Ball Z, Android 18 attends a party with her family. Android 18 is featured in the special Yo! Son Goku and His Friends Return!!, being saved by Krillin from having a building collapse on both her and her daughter after it was hit by Aka's Super Wahaha no Ha (スーパーワハハノ波, Supā Wahahanoha).

In the anime-only sequel, Dragon Ball GT, Android 18 falls under Baby's control when the latter takes over Earth, avoiding being killed by Baby despite being caught in a blast from his Super Galick Gun. She is freed of his control with the use of the Sacred Water, though has to abandon Earth the following year to avoid the planet's explosion thanks to a wish he made with the unstable Black Star Dragon Balls. Later she is nearly possessed by Android 17 to merge with him, but is helped out of his control by Krillin, who is then killed. Android 18 tries to fight him, but is defeated and left for dead. Android 18 comes to Goku's aid when he is fighting Super 17, the combination of Android 17 and Hell Fighter 17, a clone of her brother, in retaliation for Krillin's death which Goku was unaware of until she mentioned it. It is through her intervention that Goku can defeat him as she goads Super 17 to finish them both off and in doing so causes him to undergo an internal struggle that Goku exploits by attacking him while he is distracted by 18. After being assured that Krillin would be resurrected with the Dragon Balls, Android 18 is last seen at Capsule Corporation.

Android 18 has made several appearances in music. Her voice actress Meredith McCoy recorded vocals for a theme song by Bruce Faulconer for Android 18, the track being named after her. The American soundtrack also had a 2003 release titled Dragonball Z American Soundtrack – Android 18: The Android Sagas, dedicated to the character. The band Seraphim has a song titled "Android 18", describing her mixture of human and machine. Android 18 is also referenced in the song "Blessing" by Chance the Rapper when the lyricist raps that he laughs when Krillin mentions blonde hair.

Android 18 also made a guest appearance in an episode of the hit YouTube show "Death Battle". In the episode, her weapons, skills, and abilities were analyzed against the Marvel Comics hero Captain Marvel (Carol Danvers). In the end, Android 18 proved herself the better fighter and beat her opponent.

She is one of the main villains in the video series Dragon Ball Z: Light of Hope, portrayed by Amy Johnston.

==== Video games ====
Her first appearance in a Dragon Ball game was Dragon Ball Z III: Ressen Jinzōningen. She is a playable character in most Dragon Ball Z fighting games, including the Budokai series and Raging Blast series. Android 18 is the only playable android in both Dragon Ball Z: Shin Budokai and Dragon Ball Z: Shin Budokai - Another Road, having an original story in Shin Budokai where she defeats Freeza, who intended to kidnap her so she could assist him in his acquiring of the Dragon Balls on Namek and has her programming to terminate Goku erased after summoning Shenlong. In the 2010 arcade game Dragon Ball Heroes, after Super 17 is defeated by Android 18, Gohan, Vegeta, and Goku, she is forcefully merged with her brother by Towa to power him up against the three Saiyans. In addition to her role as a playable character, she has also served as a boss in other games.

In the 2015 game Dragon Ball Xenoverse, Androids 17 and 18 experience an increase in power from Demigra and attack Trunks in the alternate timeline, the possible fatality of Trunks through their encounter causing him to start disappearing. The player travels to Trunk's timeline and helps him fight 17 and 18, the latter being the first to notice. The combined force of Trunks and the player causes 17 and 18 to flee, and they are later absorbed by Cell. Android 18 can be a mentor to the player character and teach Power Blitz, Endless Shoot, Deadly Dance and Dual Destructo-Disc She explains her motives for helping out are only due to Supreme Kai of Time (Toki no Kaiōshin) having agreed to pay her in exchange for training the player.

In the 2016 game Dragon Ball Xenoverse 2, Android 17 charges Cell after his Villainous Mode allows him to defeat Piccolo and Android 16, causing him to fall back into Android 18 and knock both of them out, allowing Cell to absorb both. In downloadable content, Android 18 assists Dabura in his fight against Krillin and the player after Dabura admits that he cannot fight the two by himself. Android 18 says that she is surprised to see Krillin there as she had ordered him to look after Marron, leading Krillin to state his intent to leave the battle before realizing that he had said the same thing to 18, and Android 18 reveals that she purposely said that to trick him. As the pair fight, Android 18 admits that her personal feelings for Krillin are going to make it harder for her to fight him, and states that she will protect the Krillin and Marron of her timeline no matter the cost.

In the 2018 game Dragon Ball FighterZ, Krillin and Goku come across Android 21 and an unconscious Android 18 as Cell hovers over them, preparing to attack. Android 21 pleads for Cell to spare 18, and Goku decides to fight Cell while Krillin checks on 18. While Krillin tends to her, Android 21 explains that 18 stood up for her against Cell. In another story, 18 begins having a headache she believes is brought on by Krillin being in trouble when she is encountered by Android 16, passing out shortly thereafter. She wakes up in a laboratory with Androids 16 and 21 hovering over her, Android 16 revealing that the player is now in control of 18's body while the latter's actual soul is internally deep inside. The player makes contact with 18's soul, who admits trying to force the player out and recounts the story before requesting the player interact with 16 and 21 to find out what's happened. Android 21 admits her culpability in linking the player and 18 together for the purpose of defeating the Red Ribbon Army's clone fighters, and Android 16 stipulates that the two will return to their normal selves following all of the clones being disposed of. During the matches, Android 21 has repeated instances of losing her composure as she breaks down, culminating in her ordering 18 to fight Krillin when he stumbles across the group. After the group defeats Cell and Android 21 tries to kill him, Android 18 makes an unsuccessful attempt at linking with her to stop the murder. After 21 splits with her evil half, the evil half kills Android 16 and merges with Cell, Android 18 travels off planet to participate in the fight against 21's evil half. Goku fires a Spirit Bomb at the evil half, and Android 21 requests Android 18 look after the player before the player returns to Android 18, and 21 sacrifices herself to kill her evil half.

== Reception ==
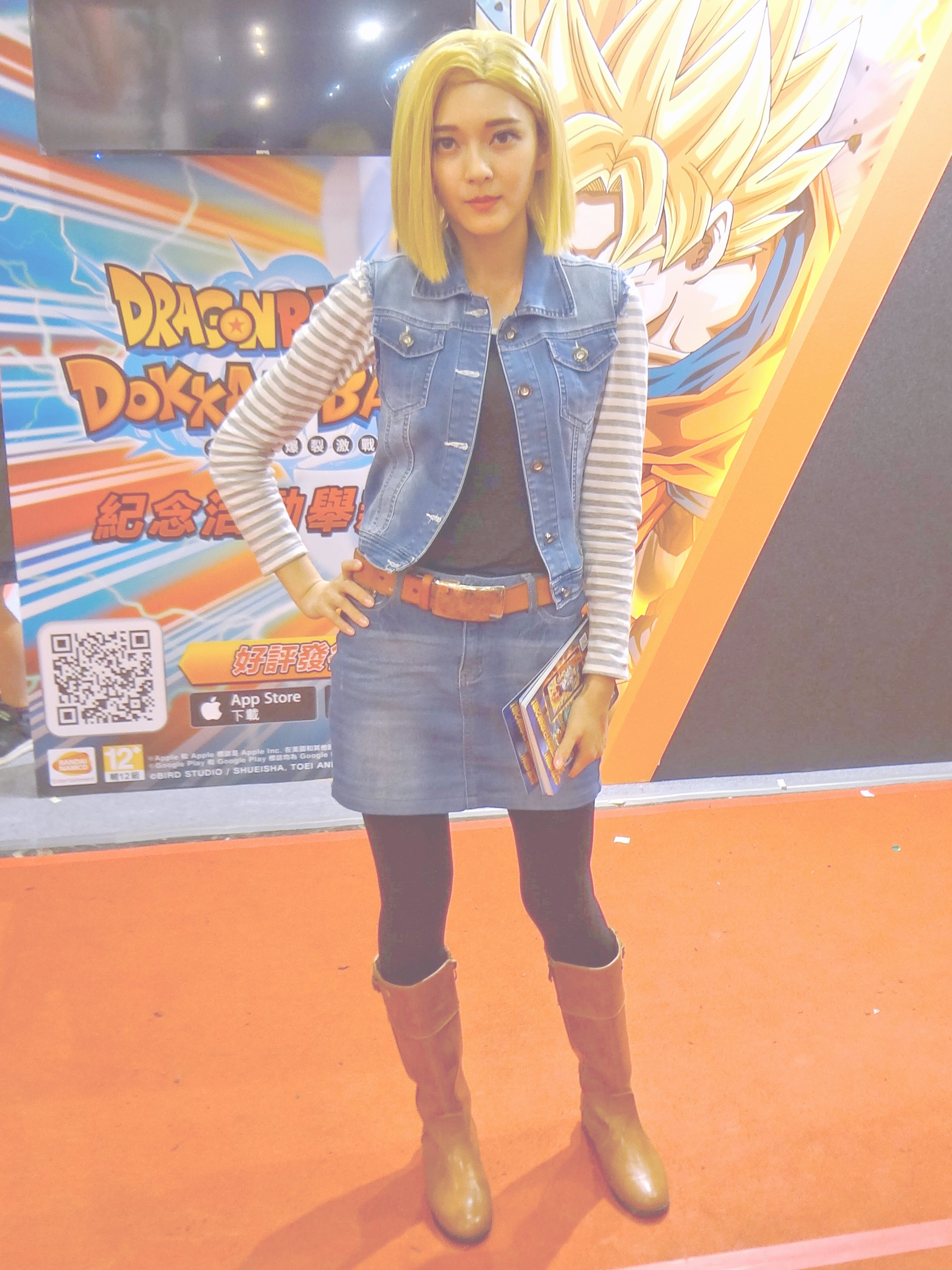
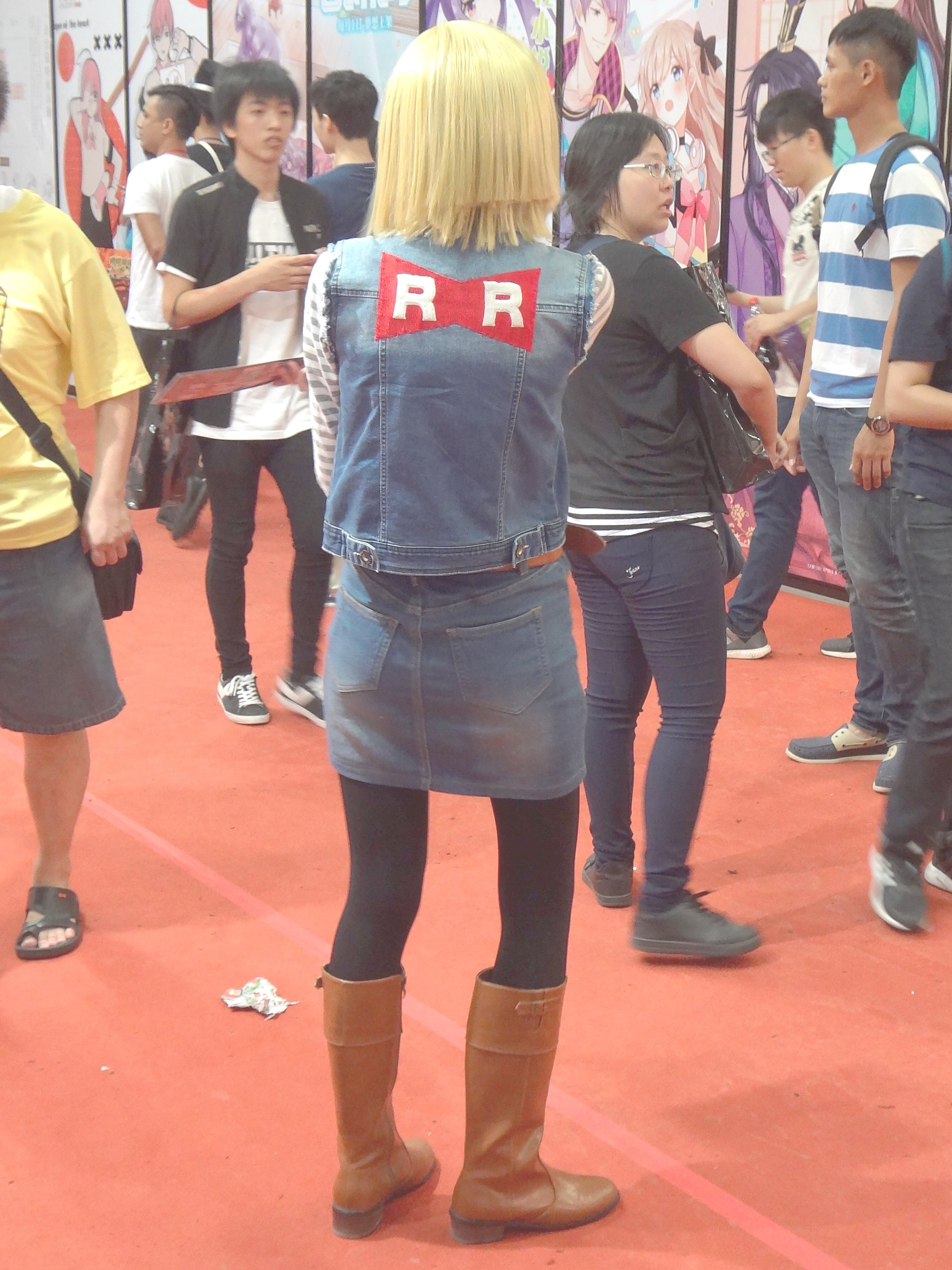
A cosplayer for Android 18 at a Bandai Namco Entertainment event in Taiwan, dressed in the character's original costume

Android 18 is a generally well-liked character, praised for her status as the sole female character to physically compete with the male cast for a time as well as her personality. In a 2004 poll among Japanese fans, Android 18 was voted the tenth most popular character in the series. In the 2025 Dragon Ball The One popularity poll, Android 18 was voted as the 8th most popular character. Her relationship with Krillin has also been met with favorability among commentators. Sheldon Pearce of Complex dubbed her the "most compelling" of the androids and credited her with keeping Krillin a relevant character after her introduction. David F. Smith of IGN believed the subplot of the relationship between Android 18 and Krillin helped to keep the Cell arc "a little more interesting". Smith ranked the development of the relationship #6 on his list "Dragon Ball Z: Top 10 Plot Twists". However, Android 18's role in the franchise past the Cell storyline has been met with mixed reception. Android 18 was ranked #4 on Santiago Rashad's list "Top Ten Misused Dragon Ball Characters" who felt that she was underused barring two later films, Bio-Broly and Battle of Gods, and that she was possibly used less due to not being a Saiyan. Aaron Hubbard of Moviepilot observed her shift from fighter to mother and wife as "unjust" given that she had been a threat to the protagonists in her first appearances, though still thought highly of the character. Chris Homer of The Fandom Post felt Android 18's "getting in the spotlight" was one of the decent moments in the Super 17 storyline.

Android 18 is a popular subject for cosplay activities by Dragon Ball fandom. Japanese mixed martial artist Itsuki Hirata has cosplayed as the character on at least one occasion. She was the visual inspiration for the Fatal Fury and The King of Fighters character Blue Mary. American mixed martial artist Ronda Rousey revealed in 2015 that she wanted to be Android 18 when she was a child.
