= Daniel Millican =

American writer (born 1965)

Daniel Millican (born June 6, 1965) is an American writer/director in the film industry and YouTube personality. His most recent film The Imposter, starring Kevin Max of dcTalk was released in 2010. His previous movie, Striking Range, starring Lou Diamond Phillips, was released in 2006 by Sony Pictures.

== Biography ==
=== Early life ===
Millican was born in Austin, Texas. He attended and graduated from the University of Texas at Arlington from 1983 to 1989 with a bachelor's degree in communications with a major in Radio/TV.

=== Filmography ===
- The Keyman: Finding Redemption
- A Promise Kept
- Striking Range
- The Imposter
- "Taking Off" and "In The Hangar" on YouTube

== Personal life ==
Millican lives with wife Jill and his two children.
