= Mary-Kate and Ashley in Action! =

Children's animated series

- Mary-Kate and Ashley Olsen as their animated counterparts
- Genre: Action/Adventure; Comedy; Children's television series
- Created by: Robin Riordan
- Developed by: Dianne Dixon; Robin Riordan
- Directed by: Jose Luis Marco; Pascal Gaugry; Jeff Wunderlich
- Starring: Mary-Kate Olsen; Ashley Olsen
- Theme music composer: S. Hoffer; G. Smith
- Opening theme: "Mary-Kate And Ashley In Action! Theme"
- Ending theme: "Mary-Kate And Ashley In Action! Theme"
- Composers: L.A. Piccirillo; Jean-Michel Guirao
- Country of origin: United States
- Original language: English
- No. of seasons: 1
- No. of episodes: 26

Production
- Executive producers: Mary-Kate Olsen; Ashley Olsen; Robert Thorne
- Producers: Neil Steinberg; Kaaren Lee Brown
- Running time: 22 minutes
- Production companies: DIC Entertainment; Dualstar Animation; WunderFilm, Inc.

Original release
- Network: ABC
- Release: October 20, 2001 – June 29, 2002

Mary-Kate and Ashley in Action! is an animated children's television series featuring the voices and likeness of Mary-Kate and Ashley Olsen. It is also a series of books that spun off, from the show. The show aired from October 20, 2001 to June 29, 2002, on the ABC block Disney's One Saturday Morning, and was cancelled after one season due to low ratings.

== Cast ==
- Mary-Kate Olsen as Herself / Special Agent Misty
- Ashley Olsen as Herself / Special Agent Amber
- Terry Chen as Rodney Choy
- Michael Heyward as Ivan Quintero
- Brendan Beiser as Quincy
- Michael Dobson as Clive Hedgemorton-Smythe
- Lenore Zann as Renee La Rouge
- Maggie Blue O'Hara as Romy Bates
- Sam Vincent as Capital D
- Kim Hawthorne as Bernice Shaw and Dr. Sandy
- Jason Connery as Bennington
- Christopher Gray as Oliver Dickens

=== Additional voices ===
- Alistair Abell
- Leanne Adachi
- Carmen Aguirre
- Sean Amsing
- Brian Arnold
- Michael Benyaer
- Suzanne Coy
- Kaj Ericsen
- Gweem Eyre
- Colin Foo
- Jean Forgie
- Glen Gould
- Mackenzie Gray
- Mark Hildreth
- Britt Irvin
- Dan Joffre
- Ellen Kennedy
- Gabe Khouth
- Kaleena Kiff
- Viv Leacock
- Santo Lombardo
- Kirstie Marsden
- Jason Michas
- Maxine Miller
- Sara Mitchell
- Vanessa Morley
- Kirby Morrow
- Jesse Moss
- Colin Murdock
- Richard Newman
- Nicole Oliver
- Alonso Oyarzun
- John Payne
- Robert O. Smith
- Tracey-Lee Smyth
- Farrell Spence
- Moneca Stori
- Lee Tockar
- Yee Jee Tso
- Valerie Sing Turner
- Kimberly Warnat
- Dale Wilson
- Nelson Wong
- Donna Yamamoto
- Chiara Zanni

== Episodes ==
No.	Title	Written by	Original release date
1	"SPF 5000"	Paul Quinn and Michel Trouillet	October 20, 2001
Clive Hedgemorton-Smythe, eccentric villain and collector of stinky cheese, triggers a global solar eclipse and Mary-Kate and Ashley must use their special agent skills and their recent astronomy homework to defeat this cheesy villain.
2	"Gift With Purchase"	Paul Quinn and Michel Trouillet	October 27, 2001
The beautiful yet villainous cosmetics queen Renee La Rouge is plotting to rule the world through mind-controlling make-up, and Mary-Kate and Ashley must leap into action to stop Renee before she gives the world (and Quincy) a permanent makeover.
3	"The Mean Team"	Dianne Dixon	November 3, 2001
Mary-Kate and Ashley dust off their gymnastics skills to go undercover at the Global Games where they must prevent Romy Bates, a brilliant but selfish computer genius and her team of mechanical robo-gymnasts from ruining the Games for everyone.
4	"Who Turned the Music Off?"	Paul Francis and Michel Trouillet	November 10, 2001
When music of all kinds is mysteriously replaced by the driving techno-beat of songs from the egotistical music mogul, Capital D, Mary-Kate and Ashley must go undercover as hot new deejays to shut down CD's evil plan to control all the music in the world.
5	"Operation Evaporation"	Pamela Pettler	November 17, 2001
When rivers, lakes and oceans begin to rapidly evaporate, Mary-Kate and Ashley must outsmart and outmaneuver their old nemesis, the eccentric, cheese-munching Clive Hedgemorton-Smythe, in order to stop his plans to control all of the world's water.
6	"Puppy Love"	Paul Francis and Michel Trouillet	December 22, 2001
When people begin neglecting their dogs in favor of their new "Bot Puppies" (robotic toys that are supposed to be "better than a real dog") Mary-Kate and Ashley must travel to the Black Forest to unmask evil toymaker (and pet hater) Fritz Doberman.
7	"Tout Sweet"	Paul Francis and Michel Trouillet	December 29, 2001
Mary-Kate and Ashley have an assignment to find out how a delicious new candy is interfering with the world's communication devices, but things get sticky when they discover that the candy's inventor is evil computer genius and spoiled brat, Romy Bates.
8	"The Cat's Meow"	Paul Francis and Michel Trouillet	January 19, 2002
When the world's largest cat show in Cairo is disrupted by a series of cat-nappings Mary-Kate and Ashley head to Cairo to investigate, and this time it is Quincy's turn to go undercover as a cat to expose Renee La Rouge's latest evil plan.
9	"Faster Food"	Paul Francis and Michel Trouillet	January 26, 2002
Mary-Kate and Ashley go undercover at the new "Quick Food" restaurant to try to unmask the evil villains behind an apparent plan to take over the world's dining establishments and discover an out-of-control sibling rivalry of two brothers.
10	"Out of Her Hair"	Paul Francis and Michel Trouillet	February 2, 2002
A rash of daring art thefts leaves a trail of evidence that points directly to Mary-Kate and Ashley. The girls must use all their special agent skills to stay at large while they clear their names, unmask the real culprits and return the stolen artwork.
11	"Snow Much Fun"	Paul Francis and Michel Trouillet	February 9, 2002
A New Zealand summit of the world's most talented teens is disrupted when the teens inexplicably lose their special abilities, and it is up to two teenage special agents, Mary-Kate and Ashley, to unravel the mystery.
12	"In a Lather"	Paul Francis and Michel Trouillet	February 16, 2002
The girls go undercover as trapeze artists to find out why professional clowns attending an international circus convention are suddenly bickering with one another. They trace the mysterious personality change to a special soap created by Renee La Rouge, who hates clowns because they use greasepaint for their face painting instead of her makeup.
13	"Pants on Fire"	Paul Francis and Michel Trouillet	February 23, 2002
Mary-Kate and Ashley take on their toughest challenge ever when they become the personal trainers for out-of-shape villains Clive Hedgemorton-Smythe and his butler Bennington, who promise to go straight if the girls help them climb K2, the world's second tallest mountain.
14	"Just Kidding"	Paul Francis and Michel Trouillet	April 6, 2002
On vacation in New Orleans with Rod and his cousin Jenna, Mary-Kate and Ashley investigate a series of bizarre ghost sightings (which turn out to be holograms, courtesy of Romy Bates) and Jenna learns what it really takes to be brave.
15	"Big Trouble"	Paul Francis and Michel Trouillet	April 13, 2002
When elephants in zoos and animal parks around the world begin to suddenly vanish without a trace, Mary-Kate and Ashley find themselves battling a clever and idealistic new adversary: Oliver Dickens, a master illusionist-turned-crusader for animal rights.
16	"Catch a Wave"	Paul Francis and Michel Trouillet	April 20, 2002
On a field trip to the Galapagos Islands, Mary-Kate and Ashley must unravel a mystery involving sea monsters, bubble wrap and fruitcake, but all comes clear when they discover the Shred Squad, consisting of Zack and Jack, who are in search for the perfect wave.
17	"Up in the Air"	Paul Francis and Michel Trouillet	April 27, 2002
Mary-Kate and Ashley enter a vintage plane race when entrants' planes begin mysteriously disappearing, and discover a Bermuda Triangle-style mystery which they can solve only by going down with their plane, leading them to their magician-nemesis Oliver Dickens.
18	"Boy Stuff"	Paul Francis and Michel Trouillet	May 4, 2002
In Antarctica, cheesy villain Clive Hedgemorton-Smythe kidnaps Rod, Ivan and Quincy, thinking the girls will "fall apart" without their male friends to help them. Mary-Kate and Ashley must not only rescue their friends but also make it home in time to host a dinner party.
19	"Bug Off"	Pamela Pettler	May 11, 2002
Clive is back and this time he has kidnapped the charismatic host of a popular nature show. Mary-Kate and Ashley must rescue the TV star from the Cheeseman's clutches while helping Ivan to deal with his fear of bugs, and stop Clive from trashing the ecosystem of the Costa Rican rainforest.
20	"Dog Gone"	Paul Francis and Michel Trouillet	May 18, 2002
It is thrills and chills on the De Luxe Express as Mary-Kate and Ashley solve the mystery of the missing Quincy, who has been kidnapped by a master magician Oliver Dickens, who masquerades as a mysterious princess. They also must rescue an imprisoned pooch.
21	"Can You Dig It?!"	Paul Francis and Michel Trouillet	May 25, 2002
Mary-Kate and Ashley head to Mexico, to the site of an ancient Mayan pyramid where archeologists are being terrorized by the ghost of King Michu Pachu, and expose a heinous plot by Renee La Rouge to plunder the King's tomb in search of the secret of eternal youth.
22	"Alien Encounters"	Paul Francis and Michel Trouillet	June 1, 2002
In Las Vegas, Ivan is kidnapped during a huge sci-fi convention. Mary-Kate and Ashley go undercover to rescue Ivan from the high-tech illusion of the Black Hole before the clock strikes midnight and Ivan will be Oliver Dickens' prisoner forever.
23	"Bad Hair Day"	Paul Francis and Michel Trouillet	June 8, 2002
Clive Hedgemorton-Smythe causes a worldwide bad hair day which immobilizes everyone on the planet. Mary-Kate and Ashley must join forces with their usual nemesis, Renee La Rouge, who will do anything - even "go good" - to get her hairdo back.
24	"Rave Reviews"	Paul Francis and Michel Trouillet	June 15, 2002
Mary-Kate and Ashley go to Moscow in search of The Butterflie Girls, who mysteriously disappeared in the "Battle of the Girl Bands" and must outwit the villainous music producer known as CD and his protégé Raven to get the Butterflies back out of their cocoons.
25	"Horsing Around"	Paul Francis and Michel Trouillet	June 22, 2002
Mary-Kate and Ashley decide to investigate a sudden disappearance of the world horse population. At first they suspect Oliver Dickens of pulling another master illusion, but when a group of horses they have under surveillance suddenly shrinks before their very eyes, they learn that Clive Hedgemorton-Smythe is attempting to create his own private pony collection.
26	"Tourist Traps"	Paul Francis and Michel Trouillet	June 29, 2002
When Mary-Kate and Ashley investigate mysterious "earthquakes" toppling famous landmarks, they discover rogue skateboarders, the Shred Squad, are triggering the quakes to create radical "skate parks" and the Great Wall of China is next.

== Production ==
The series was first announced by DualStar and the then-Disney-owned DIC Entertainment in March 1999. Initially, the series was going to be based on the Trenchcoat Twins personas.

By 2000, the series had become a co-production of DIC and Canal J, under the tentative title Action Girls. 52 episodes were tentatively planned for the series.

After its premiere on ABC in the United States, in November 2001, DIC pre-sold the series internationally to CITV (and later Nickelodeon as well) in the UK, Canal J in France, Mediaset in Italy, YTV in Canada and Fox Kids Latin America.

In April 2002, Televisa in Mexico and RTÉ in Ireland purchased broadcast rights to the series in their respective countries.

== Broadcast ==
From September 2002 – 2003, following the channel's rebrand, Toon Disney reaired the series alongside other ex-One Saturday Morning shows.

In April 2015, Nickelodeon acquired several US broadcast rights to DualStar's content library, including this series, although it was never re-ran on the channel.

== Home media ==
In June 2005, Warner Home Video released a single-disc volume called "Misty and Amber vs. Renee la Rouge", featuring five episodes of the series focusing on the villain Renee la Rouge. The episodes come with English, Spanish and French audio tracks, as well as featuring a Trivia Challenge and a Villain Bio as bonus features.

In 2016, the series was released to iTunes, but it contained the same episodes only available on the Volume 1 DVD.

== Books ==
The series spun-off a series of books published by Dualstar Books and HarperEntertainment in 2002. In the books, the twins are special agents assigned to solve different mysteries around the fashion and sports world, and have to travel to such cities as New York City, Paris, and Rome to do it.

The series includes:

- Book number 1: Makeup Shakeup. Setting: New York and Paris.
- Book number 2: The Dream Team. Setting: Rome.
- Book number 3: Fubble Bubble Trouble. Setting: The Mall of Malls, a fictional mall that appears to be based on the Mall of America
- Book number 4: Operation Evaporation. Setting: Bermuda.
- Book number 5: Dog Gone Mess: Setting: Germany.
- Book number 6: The Music Meltdown. Setting: Washington, D.C.
- Book number 7: Password: Red Hot Setting: England.
- Book number 8: Fast Food Fight Setting: Anytown, USA
