= Broken Temples =

Studio album by Kevin Max
- Released: March 10, 2015
- Genres: Contemporary Christian music, Christian rock
- Length: 37:51
- Label: Blind Thief/Motion (independent)

Kevin Max chronology
Cotes d'Armor (True Rebels) (2010)	Broken Temples (2015)

Broken Temples is the sixth album from Kevin Max. Blind Thief Recordings alongside Motion Records released the project on March 10, 2015.

== Reception ==
Professional ratings
Review scores
Source	Rating
365 Days of Inspiring Media	4.5/5 stars
Christian Music Review	3.0/5
Christian Review Magazine	4.5/5 stars
CM Addict	3/5 stars
Jesus Freak Hideout	4/5 stars 3.5/5 stars 2.5/5 stars
Louder Than the Music	4/5 stars
New Release Tuesday	4/5 stars
The Phantom Tollbooth	4/5

Specifying in a four star review by Jesus Freak Hideout, Michael Weaver realizes, "Broken Temples has shown that he isn't done." Sarah Fine, indicating for New Release Tuesday in a four star review, recognizes, "While the lyrics feel a bit safer than what most of his fans are used to at this point, they still boast the tried and true fingerprint of honesty and artistry that his work is known for, and indeed do display a rejuvenated and spiritually awoken Kevin Max." Signaling in a four out of five clocks review from The Phantom Tollbooth, Bert Saraco replies, "Broken Temples is 38 minutes of crisply-produced music featuring a modern pop sound and the unmistakable imprint of Kevin Max's vocals." Justin Sarachik, mentioning in a review by BREATHEcast, reports, "The long awaited album sees the vocalist back at his pure pop experimental goodness as his thought provoking lyrics continue to be as poignant as ever."

In the other three review for Jesus Freak Hideout, Roger Gelwicks declares in a four star second opinion that "Listeners are truly fortunate that powerhouse songwriters like Kevin Max are still creating quality music, and his latest effort will most assuredly be one of the finest achievements of CCM this year." The three and a half star 2 Cents review by Alex Caldwell describes "It's unfortunate and head-scratchingly odd though that the album is only eight original tracks long, with the two re-mixes oddly sequenced in the track running order. With just a few more songs, Max would have had a truly outstanding album." David Craft depicts in a two and a half star review that "Nothing is poorly done or of bad quality, but there's not a whole lot in play to distinguish Broken Temples."

Jonathan Andre, awarding the album four and a half stars for 365 Days of Inspiring Media, writes, "Kevin’s songwriting and lyrical flawlessness creates a moment of realisation that out of something so left field (leaving AA) can bring about something so unique, powerful and hopefully life changing for many who listen (Kevin’s new album)." Rating the album four out of five stars for Louder Than the Music, Philip Aldis says he's, "glad Kevin Max took the time to capture what he heard, so we can listen in." In a 3.0 out of five review at Christian Music Review, Lauren McLean describes, "It has beautiful reminders along with a few remixes to make the album a little bit more funky." David Ownbey, rating the album three stars, writes, "Broken Temples is well crafted and can completely stand on its own." Writing a review for Christian Review Magazine, Christian St. John rating the album four and a half stars states, "Broken Temples proves to be Kevin Max's biggest and boldest solo release to date."

== Track listing ==
No.	Title	Writer(s)	Length
1.	"Good Kings Highway"	Kevin Max, Joshua Silverberg, Kipp Williams	4:15
2.	"Light Me Up"	Kevin Max, Jonathan Steingard	4:08
3.	"Just as I Am"	Kevin Max, Joshua Silverberg, Kipp Williams	3:32
4.	"Clear"	Kevin Max, Jeff Pardo	3:20
5.	"When We Were Young"	Kevin Max, Josh Bronleewe, Sam Tinnesz	3:10
6.	"That Was Then and This is Now"	Kevin Max, Cory Basil, Stu Garrard	3:58
7.	"White Horse"	Kevin Max, Brennan Strawn, Brent Kutzle	4:02
8.	"Another Big Mistake" (Derek Webb remix)		3:42
9.	"Going Clear" (Derek Webb remix)		3:19
10.	"Infinite" (Featuring Rachael Lampa)	Kevin Max, Kyle Lee	4:25
Total length:			37:51

Deluxe edition
No.	Title	Length
11.	"Memoria"	3:39
12.	"Lay Down Your Weapons My Friend"	3:05
13.	"Freak Flag"	3:30
14.	"Desperate Heart"	4:33
15.	"That Was Then And This Is Now" (demo version)	3:59

== Charts ==
Chart (2015)	Peak position
US Top Christian Albums (Billboard)	32
US Heatseekers Albums (Billboard)	22
