= Crashing Gates =

EP by Kevin Max
- Released: December 9, 2008
- Recorded: 2008
- Studios: X Marks the Spot, Nashville, Tennessee
- Genre: Alternative rock
- Length: 30:15
- Label: dPulse
- Producers: Kevin Max, Jonathan Smith a.k.a. TheRealJonSmith

Kevin Max chronology
The Blood (2007)	Crashing Gates (2008)	Cotes d'Armor (True Rebels) (2010)

Professional ratings
Review scores
Source	Rating
Christianity Today	4/5 stars
Cross Rhythms	9/10 stars
Jesus Freak Hideout	2.5/5 stars
The Phantom Tollbooth	4/5 stars
Soul-Audio	8.5/10 stars

Crashing Gates is an EP by Kevin Max, released on December 9, 2008 on iTunes Store. It is a continuation of The Imposter—"a more focused collection of songs about the Apocalypse."

According to Max, Universal (dPulse's parent label) considered releasing a "full package with added songs" in 2009. The "full package," Cotes d'Armor (True Rebels), was eventually released in 2010 and featured five new songs in addition to remixes of the seven on Crashing Gates.

== Track listing ==
1. "Traveler" – 4:35
2. "Baby, I'm Your Man" – 3:39
3. "The Saint of Lonely Hearts" – 2:07
4. "Future Love Song" – 5:51
5. "Out of the Wild" – 3:42
6. "Crashing Gates and Passing Keepers" – 6:11
7. "Your Beautiful Mind 2009" – 4:14

== Personnel ==
- Kevin Max – vocals, keyboards
- Erick Cole – guitars
- Cary Barlowe – guitars
- Jonathan Smith (a.k.a. TheRealJonSmith) – acoustic piano, synthesizers, electric guitars, bass, drums, percussion, producer, recording, mixing
- Abigail Johnson – backing vocals on "Baby, I'm Your Man"
