= Life After Death (TobyMac album) =

Studio album by TobyMac
- Released: August 19, 2022
- Recorded: 2019–2022
- Genre: CCM; pop; pop rock; hip hop
- Length: 51:02
- Label: ForeFront
- Producer: Toby McKeehan • Bryan Fowler • Micah Kuiper • Dave Lubben • Tommie Profitt • Kyle Williams • Cole Walowac • Jon Reddick • Jacob Reske

TobyMac chronology
Live in Denver (2021)	Life After Death (2022)	Heaven On My Mind (2025)

Singles from Life After Death
- 1. "21 Years" Released: January 10, 2020; 2. "I'm Sorry (A Lament)" Released: October 2, 2020; 3. "Help Is on the Way (Maybe Midnight)" Released: February 19, 2021; 4. "Promised Land" Released: September 17, 2021; 5. "The Goodness" Released: June 2, 2022; 6. "Cornerstone" Released: February 17, 2023; 7. "Faithfully" Released: September 29, 2023

Life After Death is the ninth studio album by Christian hip hop artist TobyMac. It was released on August 19, 2022. It is his sixth album to top the Billboard Christian Albums chart. The album's third single, "Help Is On the Way (Maybe Midnight)", peaked at No. 3 on the Hot Christian Songs chart.

== Background ==
TobyMac claimed that this was his most emotional album that he ever recorded. In October 2019, his eldest son Truett died after an accidental drug overdose. TobyMac said, "I immediately went to write, because that's what I know to do when I'm in so much pain. You go to [write] what you know, what you love and what brings you peace. I immediately started writing – and I wrote '21 Years'. Then I wrote a song called 'Faithfully', and I wrote 'Everything About You' in the first few months after Truett passed."

== Singles ==
"21 Years" was released on January 10, 2020, and is about TobyMac's son Truett Foster, who died a couple months prior, at the age of 21. The song peaked at No. 3 on the US Hot Christian Songs Chart.

"I'm Sorry (A Lament)" was released on October 2, 2020. The song peaked at No. 25 on the US Hot Christian Songs Chart.

"Help Is On the Way (Maybe Midnight)" was released on February 19, 2021. The song peaked at No. 3 on the US Hot Christian Songs Chart.

"Promised Land" was released on September 17, 2021. The song peaked at No. 9 on the US Hot Christian Songs Chart. The song featured pop rock artist Sheryl Crow on the OG Collab version.

"The Goodness" was released on June 2, 2022. The song featured new artist Blessing Offor, and peaked at No. 1 on the US Hot Christian Songs Chart. This song was then performed at the 53rd GMA Dove Awards.

"Cornerstone" was released on February 17, 2023. The song features CCM artist Zach Williams.

"Faithfully" was released on September 29, 2023.

== Critical reception ==
Professional ratings
Review scores
Source	Rating
AllMusic	4/5 stars
Jesus Freak Hideout	4.5/5 stars
JubileeCast	4/5 stars
New Release Today	2/5 stars
365 Days of Inspiring Media	5/5 stars

Life After Death received mostly positive ratings from critics. Jesus Freak Hideout said of the album, "With a lyrical cohesion and an almost theatrical community feel throughout, Life After Death is a tough album (if you understand the sad context of it) that nevertheless gives hope...is well worth your time, and shows that in Christ, believers 'do not weep as those who have no hope.' Tragedy is not the end of the story." Giving the album a perfect 5, 365 Days of Inspiring Media said that the album was “very powerful, heartfelt, compelling, and challenging, while also laced in the joyfulness colliding with lament and sorrow that comes after a death of a loved one. It's knowing the promise of God while still reconciling how it looks like, this side of eternity. And that is what is seen all through Toby's album, and it's been a blast to listen to it." AllMusic's Marcy Donelson rated the album 4 out of 5, stating that "[TobyMac's] eventual ninth album, Life After Death, finds the genre-blurring Christian artist navigating the aftermath [of his son's death] alongside a slew of guests with a poignant mix of warm appreciations and invigorated motivational song." JubileeCast gave 4 out of 5 and said, "Though not perfect, the album does have many powerful moments. Most importantly, this is an honest set of songs. TobyMac doesn't give us recycled answers to the problem of suffering. Rather, using the space of 15 songs, he works with us through these issues. Reflective of life, there are some downers as well as some sparks of joy and hope." New Release Today's Average NRTeam rating was 2 out of 5.

== Accolades ==
Awards
Year	Organization	Award	Result	Ref.
2023	Grammy Awards	Best Contemporary Christian Music Album	Nominated	

Year-end lists
Publication	Accolade	Rank	Ref.
Jesus Freak Hideout	2022 Staff Picks: Christopher Smith's Album Picks	5	
Jesus Freak Hideout	2022 Staff Picks: Alex Caldwell's Album Picks	4	

== Commercial performance ==
The album peaked at No. 34 on the US Billboard 200 and No. 1 on the Top Christian Albums chart with 16,000 album-equivalent units.

== Track listing ==
Life After Death track listing
No.	Title	Writer(s)	Producer(s)	Length
1.	"Help Is on the Way (Maybe Midnight)"	Toby McKeehan, Micah Kuiper	Micah Kuiper, Toby McKeehan	3:01
2.	"The Goodness" (featuring Blessing Offor)	McKeehan, Kyle Williams, Gabriel Patillo, Bryan Fowler	Bryan Fowler, Kyle Williams, McKeehan	3:45
3.	"Deeper" (featuring Tauren Wells)	McKeehan, Kuiper	Kuiper, McKeehan	3:14
4.	"Show Up Choose Love" (featuring Jon Reddick)	McKeehan, Jon Reddick, Tommy Sims, Janice Gaines, Kuiper, Benji Cowart, Tony Wood	Kuiper, Jon Reddick, McKeehan	3:32
5.	"Promised Land (Collab OG)" (featuring Sheryl Crow)	McKeehan, Adam Agee	Kuiper, McKeehan	3:30
6.	"Everything About You" (featuring Marlee)	McKeehan, Marlee McKeehan, Reddick	Fowler, Williams, McKeehan	3:27
7.	"Life On It" (featuring Sarah Reeves)	McKeehan, Fowler, Cole Walowac, Jacob Reske, Frank Dukes	Fowler, Cole Walowac, Kuiper, McKeehan	3:39
8.	"Faithfully"	McKeehan, Williams	Williams, Kuiper, McKeehan	2:46
9.	"Cornerstone" (featuring Zach Williams)	McKeehan, Kuiper, Fowler	Fowler, Kuiper, McKeehan	3:39
10.	"Found" (featuring Terrian, Anike)	McKeehan, Lydia Lubben, Dave Lubben, Mutiat Isola	Dave Lubben, McKeehan	3:29
11.	"Fire's Burnin'" (featuring Cory Asbury)	McKeehan, Kuiper, Fowler	Fowler, Kuiper, McKeehan	3:04
12.	"Space" (featuring DC Talk, Michael Tait, Kevin Max)	McKeehan, Lubben	Lubben, McKeehan	3:04
13.	"21 Years"	McKeehan, Fowler, Blake NeeSmith	Fowler, McKeehan	4:03
14.	"I'm Sorry (A lament)"	McKeehan, Tommee Profitt	Tommee Profitt, McKeehan	4:23
15.	"Rest" (featuring Terrian, Gabe Real)	McKeehan, Lubben	Lubben, McKeehan	2:19
Total length:				51:02

== Personnel ==
Credits adapted from liner notes.

- TobyMac — songwriting, vocals, producer
- Bryan Fowler — producer on tracks 2, 6, 7, 9, 11, & 13, engineering, guitar, bass, background vocals on tracks 2, 6, 7, 9, & 11
- Dave Lubben — producer on tracks 10, 12 & 15, percussion, guitar, engineering, keyboards, strings, acoustic guitar, background vocals on tracks 10 & 12
- Jon Reddick — producer on track 4, guest vocals on track 4, background vocals on tracks 1, 4 & 5, keyboards
- Micah Kuiper — producer on tracks 1, 3, 4, 5, 7, 8, 9, & 11, engineering, programming, guitar, bass, keyboards, drums, background vocals on tracks 1, 7, 9, & 11
- Tommee Profitt — producer on track 14, instrumentation
- Kyle Williams — producer on tracks 2, 6, & 8, background vocals on tracks 2, 6 & 8, guitar
- Cole Walowac — producer on track 7
- Serban Ghenea — mixing
- Nick Rad — mixing
- Bob Boyd — mastering
- Doug Sarrett — mastering, engineering
- Chris Gehringer — mastering
- Reske — co-producer on track 7
- Zach Williams — guest vocals on track 9
- Blessing Offor — guest vocals on track 2, background vocals on track 4
- Gabe Real — guest vocals on track 15, background vocals on tracks 1, 2, 4 & 5
- Terrian — guest vocals on tracks 10 & 15
- Anike — guest vocals on track 10
- Marlee McKeehan — guest vocals on track 6
- Tauren Wells — guest vocals on track 3
- Sarah Reeves — guest vocals on track 7
- Sheryl Crow — guest vocals on track 5
- Michael Tait — guest vocals on track 12
- Kevin Max — guest vocals on track 12
- Cory Asbury — guest vocals on track 11
- Lydi Lynn — piano, background vocals on track 10
- Tony Lucido — bass
- Sterloid — drums
- Terence F. Clark — drums
- Aaron Sterling — drums
- Paul Mabury — drums
- Tim Rosenau — guitar
- Scott Mills — guitar
- Tyler Summers — baritone saxophone, tenor saxophone
- Jeff Bailey — trumpet
- Keith Everette Smith — trumpet, string arrangement, horn arrangement, brass arrangement
- Steve Patrick — trumpet
- Barry Green — trombone
- Bob McChesney — trombone
- Raymond Mason — trombone
- Anna Spina — French horn
- Jennifer Kummer — French horn
- David Gerald Sutton — strings
- Betsy Lamb — viola
- Kristin Wilkinson — viola
- Carolyn Bailey — violin
- David Angell — violin
- David Davidson — violin
- Janet Darnall — violin
- Jenny Bifano — violin
- Karen Winklemann — violin
- Anthony LaMarchina — cello
- Sari Reist — cello
- Janice Gaines — background vocals on track 4
- Andrew Thompson — background vocals on track 5
- Tasha Smith — background vocals on track 5
- Debi Selby — choir on track 14
- Emoni Wilkins — background vocals on track 5, choir on track 14
- Jason Eskridge — choir on track 14
- Moiba Mustapha — choir on track 14
- Nickie Conley — choir on track 14
- Travis Cottrell — choir on track 14
- Ryan Stevenson — background vocals on track 2
- Michael Cochren — background vocals on track 1

== Charts ==
=== Weekly charts ===
Weekly chart performance for Life After Death
Chart (2022)	Peak position
US Billboard 200	34
US Top Christian Albums (Billboard)	1

=== Year-end charts ===
Year-end chart performance for Life After Death
Chart (2022)	Position
US Christian Albums (Billboard)	44
Chart (2023)	Position
US Christian Albums (Billboard)	16
