= Promised Land (TobyMac song) =

2021 single by TobyMac

Single by TobyMac
- Released: September 17, 2021
- Genre: Contemporary Christian music
- Length: 3:29
- Label: ForeFront; Capitol CMG
- Songwriters: Adam Agee; Toby McKeehan
- Producers: Micah Kuiper; Toby McKeehan

TobyMac singles chronology
| "Like You" (2021) | "Promised Land" (2021) | "The Goodness" (2022) |

Music videos
- "Promised Land" on YouTube

"Promised Land" is a song by American Christian hip hop musician TobyMac. The song was released as a single on September 17, 2021. TobyMac co-wrote the song with Adam Agee, and collaborated with Micah Kuiper in the production of the single.

"Promised Land" peaked at No. 9 on the US Hot Christian Songs chart. "Promised Land" received a GMA Dove Award nomination for Short Form Video of the Year (Concept) at the 2022 GMA Dove Awards.

In January 2022, TobyMac released two new versions of the song, "Promised Land (Collab New)" and "Promised Land (Collab OG)", both of which feature Sheryl Crow.

== Background ==
In June 2021, "Promised Land" was reported to be TobyMac's next single following "Help Is On the Way (Maybe Midnight)" which was released in February 2021, with TobyMac expecting its release in September or October. The song was dedicated to TobyMac's grandfather, a miner in West Virginia who died from black lung disease.

TobyMac released "Promised Land" with its accompanying music video on September 17, 2021.

== Composition ==
"Promised Land" is composed in the key of G with a tempo of 84 beats per minute and a musical time signature of 4/4.

== Reception ==
=== Critical response ===
Jonathan Andre of 365 Days of Inspiring Media gave a positive review of the song, concluding: "Toby’s new song is one of hope and poignancy, and one that can maybe call us into action, too. As we as people living in this COVID-19 world need to ask ourselves where our promised land is, hopefully Toby can bring us into a space where we can be ok with asking the hard question of where our promised land lies, and who it lies in, and if we don’t know where, then why not, and maybe we should just start going on that journey, sooner than later." In his review for Jesus Freak Hideout, Alex Caldwell wrote a favourable review of the single, concluding "With an honest, plainspoken delivery, and with only a hint of a triumphal ending, "Promised Land" flies in the face of most Prosperity Gospel-type teachings, and wisely insinuates that not every challenge or hard time down here will have a traditional happy ending. But TobyMac rightly states that "through the seasons" of life, the Lord is the sustainer, and His presence is the "promised land". The single is a new side of this music veteran and a refreshing bit of honesty in Christian music."

=== Accolades ===
Awards
| Year | Organization | Award | Result | Ref |
|---|---|---|---|---|
| 2022 | GMA Dove Awards | Short Form Video of the Year (Concept) | Nominated | |

Year-end lists
| Publication | Accolade | Rank | Ref. |
|---|---|---|---|
| 365 Days of Inspiring Media | Top 50 Songs of 2021 | 9 | |

== Commercial performance ==
"Promised Land" debuted on the Christian Airplay chart dated September 25, 2021, at No. 49.

"Promised Land" debuted at No. 37 on the US Hot Christian Songs chart dated October 9, 2021,

== Music videos ==
The official music video of "Promised Land" was published on TobyMac's YouTube channel on September 19, 2021. The music video was filmed at Beckley Exhibition Coal Mine in West Virginia, featuring TobyMac as a miner.

On November 25, 2021, TobyMac released the official lyric video of the song.

== Track listing ==
"Promised Land"
| No. | Title | Writer(s) | Length |
|---|---|---|---|
| 1. | "Promised Land" | Adam Agee; Toby McKeehan | 3:29 |

"Promised Land" — Apple Music re-release bonus content
| No. | Title | Length |
|---|---|---|
| 2. | "Promised Land" (music video) | 3:29 |

== Personnel ==
Adapted from AllMusic.

- Josh Bailey — A&R
- Chad Chrisman — A&R
- Chris Gehringer — mastering engineer
- Micah Kuiper — background vocals, guitar, producer
- Scott Mills — guitar
- Gabe Patillo — background vocals
- Nick Rad — mixing
- Jon Reddick — background vocals
- Tim Rosenau — guitar
- Tasha Smith — background vocals
- Aaron Sterling — drums
- Andrew Thompson — background vocals
- TobyMac — primary artist, background vocals, producer
- Emoni Wilkins — background vocals

== Charts ==
=== Weekly charts ===
Weekly chart performance for "Promised Land"
| Chart (2021–2022) | Peak position |
|---|---|
| US Hot Christian Songs (Billboard) | 9 |
| US Christian Airplay (Billboard) | 5 |
| US Christian AC (Billboard) | 3 |

=== Year-end charts ===
Year-end chart performance for "Promised Land"
| Chart (2022) | Position |
|---|---|
| US Christian Songs (Billboard) | 27 |
| US Christian Airplay (Billboard) | 23 |
| US Christian AC (Billboard) | 21 |

== Release history ==
Release dates and formats for "Promised Land"
| Region | Date | Format | Label | Ref. |
|---|---|---|---|---|
| Various | September 17, 2021 | Digital download; streaming | ForeFront Records | |
| Various | September 20, 2021 | Digital download; streaming; (Apple Music re-release) | ForeFront Records | |
| United States | October 8, 2021 | Christian radio | Capitol CMG | |
