= The Imposter (album) =

Studio album by Kevin Max
- Released: October 11, 2005
- Recorded: 2004–2005
- Studios: Sonikwire Studios (Irvine, California); Northern Records (Yorba Linda, California).
- Genre: Progressive rock
- Length: 59:58
- Label: Northern Records
- Producer: Kevin Max

Kevin Max chronology
Between the Fence & the Universe (2004)	The Imposter (2005)	The Blood (2007)

Professional ratings
Review scores
Source	Rating
allmusic	4.5/5 stars
Jesus Freak Hideout	4.5/5 stars
Christianity Today	4/5 stars
Jesus Freak Hideout	4.5/5 stars
The Phantom Tollbooth	(favorable)

The Imposter is the second full-length album by American singer-songwriter Kevin Max and was released on October 11, 2005 on Northern Records. The title and overall themes of the album draw inspiration from the writings of theologian (and friend of Max's) Brennan Manning, particularly Manning's books Ragamuffin Gospel and Abba's Child. The title track, according to Max, concerns "the fight between the flesh and the spirit."

The Imposter's musical textures are different from those found on Stereotype Be. Gone are the Middle Eastern musical influences in favor of a mixture of ballads and faster rock songs with more pronounced classic rock and blues influences. The album's lyrics are also more straightforward than those on Stereotype Be and, perhaps in keeping with a simpler feel, no spoken-word segments are on The Imposter, although there is a reading that opens "Fade to Red."

Songs from The Imposter album were used in a film of the same name. The songs used were "The Imposter," "Sanctuary," "Your Beautiful Mind," and "The Imposter's Song."

== Track listing ==
Album release
No.	Title	Writer(s)	Length
1.	"Confessional Booth"	Erick Cole, Kevin Max, Andrew D. Prickett	3:08
2.	"The Imposter"	Max, Prickett	3:47
3.	"Sanctuary"	Max, Prickett	3:54
4.	"Your Beautiful Mind"	Max, Prickett	4:15
5.	"Jumpstart Your Electric Heart!"	Max, Prickett	3:39
6.	"Platform"	Max, Dave Perkins	4:42
7.	"The Royal Path of Life"	Max, Prickett	3:39
8.	"The Imposter's Song"	Max	3:02
9.	"Stay"	Max, Prickett	4:21
10.	"I Need You, the End"	Cole, Max	6:54
11.	"When He Returns"	Bob Dylan	5:00
12.	"Fade to Red"	Max, Prickett	6:12
13.	"Letting Go"	Max	3:30
Total length:			56:03

== Personnel ==
- Kevin Max – vocals
- Byron Hagen – keyboards, acoustic piano, programming
- Andrew D. Prickett – keyboards, programming, guitars
- Erick Cole – guitars
- Elijah Thomson – bass
- Aaron Sterling – drums
- Frank Lenz – drums, string arrangements
- Holly Nelson – backing vocals

== Production ==
- Jeff Anderson – executive producer
- Andrew D. Prickett – producer, engineer, mixing
- Kevin Max – co-producer, mixing
- Elijah Thomson – engineer
- Chris Colbert – mixing
- Mark Rodriguez – mastering at Vision Mastering (Stanton, California)
- Lance Alton Troxel – art direction, design
- Melinda DiMauro – photography
