= Raven Songs 101 =

Studio album by Kevin Max & Adrian Belew
- Released: 2003 (Independent); April 7, 2009 (dPulse)
- Recorded: 2002
- Genre: Spoken word
- Length: 29:20
- Label: Independent (2003) dPulse (2009)
- Producer: Kevin Max; Adrian Belew

Kevin Max chronology
| Stereotype Be (2001) | Raven Songs 101 (2003) | Between the Fence & the Universe (2004) |

Adrian Belew chronology
| Coming Attractions (2000) | Raven Songs 101 (2003) | Side One (2005) |

Professional ratings
Review scores
| Source | Rating |
|---|---|
| AllMusic | 3.5/5 stars |

Raven Songs 101 is a spoken-word album by Kevin Max and Adrian Belew. It features Max reading several poems from his book The Detritus of Dorian Gray. Belew provides the music and sound effects.

Raven Songs was re-released as a digital download on April 7, 2009, by Max's current label, dPulse Recordings.

== Track listing ==
1. "One" – 2:34
2. "Raven Song 101" – 1:45
3. "Whalers Tales" – 1:58
4. "Black Leather and a Microphone" – 3:25
5. "And You Tremble at His Feet" – 1:18
6. "Swing" – 1:59
7. "River" – 5:07
8. "When the Dawn Comes" – 1:13
9. "Raising Cain" – 3:37
10. "Untitled" – 2:26
11. "Time the Fever to a Boil" – 4:04
