= Between the Fence & the Universe =

EP by Kevin Max
- Released: August 1, 2004
- Recorded: 2003–2004
- Studio: The Noise Floor Studios
- Genre: Alternative rock
- Length: 28:18
- Label: Northern
- Producers: Kevin Max; Jonathan Smith; Doug Grean

Kevin Max chronology
Raven Songs 101 (2003)	Between the Fence & the Universe (2004)	The Imposter (2005)

Professional ratings
Review scores
Source	Rating
Cross Rhythms	9/10 stars
Jesus Freak Hideout	4.5/5 stars
The Phantom Tollbooth	3.5/5 stars

Between the Fence & the Universe is an EP by recording artist Kevin Max, initially released independently and later by Northern Records in 2004. It is a compilation of previously unreleased songs that Max initially recorded for his second album for Nashville-based ForeFront Records. However, Max and Forefront parted ways before a second record could ever be released. Max eventually moved to Los Angeles and released the songs on this EP.

== Track listing ==
=== Original independent release ===
1. "Seek" – 3:38
2. "21st-Century Darlings" – 2:32
3. "Irish Hymn" – 3:43
4. "Stranded 72.5" – 3:43
5. "Golden" – 5:57
6. "To the Dearly Departed" – 3:59

=== Northern Records re-release ===
1. "Seek" – 3:38
2. "21st-Century Darlings" – 2:32
3. "Irish Hymn" – 3:43
4. "Stranded 72.5" – 3:43
5. "Golden" – 5:57
6. "Hallelujah" (Leonard Cohen) – 4:53
7. "To the Dearly Departed" – 3:59

== Personnel ==
- Kevin Max – vocals, keyboards (1–5, 7), backing vocals (5)
- Erick Cole – programming (1, 7), guitars (1–5, 7), backing vocals (5)
- Jason Garner – programming (1, 7)
- Jesse Supalla – acoustic piano (3, 5)
- Doug Grean – keyboards (6), bass (6)
- Cary Barlowe – guitars (2, 3, 4)
- Andy Prickett – guitars (6)
- Tony Lucido – bass (1–5, 7)
- Jonathan Smith (a.k.a. TheRealJonSmith) – drums (1–5, 7), percussion (1–5, 7)

== Production ==
- Jonathan Smith (a.k.a. TheRealJonSmith) – producer (1–5, 7), recording (1–5, 7), engineer (1–5, 7), mixing (1–5, 7)
- Erick Cole – recording (1–5, 7)
- Kevin Max – recording (1–5, 7), producer (6)
- Doug Grean – producer (6), engineer (6), mixing (6)
- Skye McCaskey – assistant engineer (1–5, 7)
- Dwayne Larring – additional mixing (1–5, 7)
- Lyndon Perry – design
- Melissa Barnes – design, photography
- Randy Spencer – management
