= The Blood (album) =

Studio album by Kevin Max
- Released: December 26, 2007
- Studios: The Underground and IHOF Studio (Nashville, Tennessee)
- Genre: Gospel
- Length: 34:29
- Label: Infinity
- Producers: Will Owsley, Kevin Max

Kevin Max chronology
The Imposter (2005)	The Blood (2007)	Crashing Gates (2008)

Professional ratings
Review scores
Source	Rating
Christian Music Central	(91%)
Grand Rapids Press	3.5/4 stars
Jesus Freak Hideout	4.5/5 stars
The Phantom Tollbooth	5/5 stars

The Blood is an album by Christian alternative rock artist Kevin Max that was released December 26, 2007.

== Overview ==
Unlike Max's previous albums (both solo and as part of dc Talk), The Blood is a gospel album instead of having his usual rock stylings. Max had commented for the press release, stating, "It has taken me almost two decades to come full circle and realize how much gospel music has inspired me and influenced my decisions in music." He also explains a bit more on the style, stating, "The Blood is not a classic hymns cover project or a white/homogenized version of black gospel or soul music, it's a sensitive and stylized adaptation of the music that was at the root of rock and roll, blues, and popular culture."

== Track listing ==
No.	Title	Writer(s)	Length
1.	"The Old Rugged Cross"	George Bennard	1:33
2.	"The Cross" (featuring dc Talk)	Prince	3:23
3.	"Run On for a Long Time" (featuring Chris Sligh)	Chris Goldsmith, John Chelew, The Blind Boys of Alabama	3:14
4.	"Trouble of the World"	Mahalia Jackson	4:49
5.	"I Know His Blood Can Make Me Whole"	Blind Willie Johnson	2:49
6.	"Up Above My Head I Hear Music in the Air" (featuring Vince Gill & Amy Grant)	Sister Rosetta Tharpe	2:55
7.	"They Won't Go When I Go"	Stevie Wonder, Yvonne Wright	4:46
8.	"The Blood Will Never Lose Its Power" (featuring Ashley Cleveland, Judson Spence, Kim Keyes)	Andraé Crouch	3:21
9.	"People Get Ready" (featuring Erica Campbell of Mary Mary, Vince Gill)	Curtis Mayfield	4:14
10.	"One Way, One Blood" (featuring Joanne Cash)	Kevin Max	3:25
Total length:			34:21

== Personnel ==
- Kevin Max – lead vocals, backing vocals, keyboards, handclaps
- John Fields – keyboards (2), guitars (2), bass (2)
- Phil Madeira – Hammond B3 organ (7), organ (7)
- Ronald Rawls – Rhodes piano (9)
- Will Owsley – guitars, bass
- Vince Gill – guitars (6, 9)
- John Mark Painter – bass (3, 4), horns (3, 4)
- Dorian "Wookie" Crozier – drums (2, 6, 9)
- Bobby Huff – drums (3, 4, 8)
- Ashley Cleveland – backing vocals (6, 8, 9)
- Judson Spence – backing vocals (6, 8, 9)
- Kim Keyes – backing vocals (6, 8, 9)

== Production ==
- Jamie Warden – executive producer
- Will Owsley – producer, engineer, mixing
- Kevin Max – co-producer, additional lyrics
- Hank Williams – mastering at MasterMix (Nashville, Tennessee)
- Dave Darr – design, layout
- Allen Clark – photography
