= 3kStatic =

Electronica music group

3kStatic is an electronica music group founded in 1998, consisting of Dean Capone, Jeremy Dickens, Justin Katz.

== Releases ==
In 2004, they released the album Perversion: for Profit; using audio sampled from the 1965 propaganda film Perversion for Profit. The group's work was featured on the soundtrack of the new season of MTV's Real World. The band's subsequent release The Great Republic was released in 2005, and distributed by Cargo Records (Germany).

The band's 2006 album release, Where's Our Piece of the Groovy World, and 2007 effort Voodoo Science were entry candidates (Best Electronic/Dance Album) for the 50th and 51st GRAMMY Awards, respectively. Both albums included collaborations with artists outside the electronic music genre. In February 2009, Sony Creative Software released the 3kStatic album Evolver and the companion sound library Evolver; Distinctive Electronica, the first Sony release of an original album and sound library.

On August 28, 2009, the 3kStatic track 'Projected Tones' entered the National Dance Chart(Canada) at #12 (#16 overall). The single 'Ma-Ma-Ma Belle', a reworking of the Electric Light Orchestra song recorded with Orchestra/ELO and Parthenon Huxley was released the same year.

The Kevin Max album 'Cotes d' Armor (True Rebels)' was released on August 24, 2010. Produced by 3kStatic in association with Kevin Max, the album also features guest performances and contributions from Graham Crabb, Adrian Belew, Tedd T., Lynn Nichols and others.

A new EP 'Apokrifa Digital was officially released on November 16, 2010. 'Black Body Radiator', released on the same day, while the band's remix of the KMFDM track 'Godlike 2010' was released September 14.

The album The Society of the Spectacle was released in 2012, with Theme From Cultural Unwind, released as a free download. The music of 3kStatic also appears in the 2010 theatrical release of the films Crackhead Jesus, Townies and others.

The 3kStatic 'Suburban Secrets Remix' single 'Little Mighty Rabbit' by band Lords Of Acid was released September 27, 2011 by Metropolis Records. Additional commissioned 3kStatic remixes include work for Chris Vrenna, Billie Ray Martin and many others.

The collective's album The New Truth was released April 2015, with Capone now the sole continuing member since 2014.

An expanded version of The New Truth, including previously unreleased archival tracks, was released June 2015.

The album Active Measures was released December 2, 2016, and included the single 'No Better Than The Bad'.

Released October 20, 2017, the album Deform Over Dysfunction included ten new tracks, with the compact disc version also including additional audio material.

The album Idol Pleasures was released December 6, 2019 on digital, disc and vinyl formats, with the lead single 'Lust For Conquest' released in advance to DJ promotional pools.

A follow-up EP, Hypnotic Response, was released March 6, 2020, with an additional single Writing on the Wall released June 26, 2020.

The collaborative album Radio Teknika with Kevin Max was released July 3, 2020 on disc, digital and visual album formats.

The album Babalon Working was released on disc, digital and vinyl January 15, 2021. The album includes contributions on the track Magazine Trash by former Public Image Ltd. and Department S bassist Pete Jones.

The album Gunrubber was released on disc, digital, vinyl and cassette January 28, 2022. The album featured an instrumental version of the Cabaret Voltaire single I Want You.
