= Kenny Willekes =

American football player (born 1997)

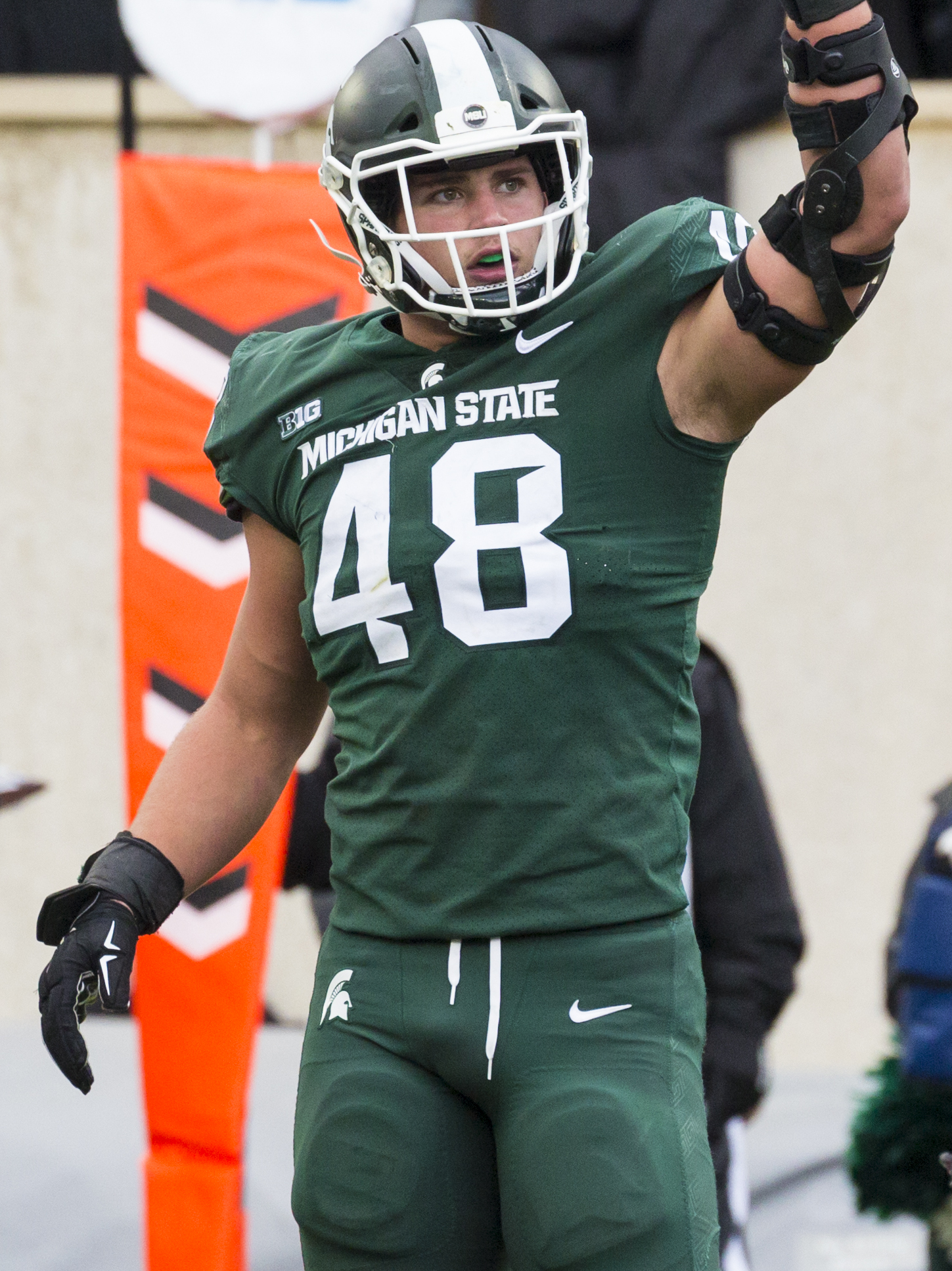
- Willekes with the Michigan State Spartans in 2018

No. 48 – Columbus Aviators
- Position: Defensive end
- Roster status: Active

Personal information
- Born: July 22, 1997 (age 29); Rockford, Michigan, U.S.
- Listed height: 6 ft 3 in (1.91 m)
- Listed weight: 263 lb (119 kg)

Career information
- High school: NorthPointe Christian (Grand Rapids, Michigan)
- College: Michigan State (2015–2019)
- NFL draft: 2020: 7th round, 225th overall pick

Career history
- Minnesota Vikings (2020–2022); Michigan Panthers (2024–2025); Pittsburgh Steelers (2025)*; Columbus Aviators (2026–present)
- * Offseason or practice squad member only

Awards and highlights
- Big Ten Defensive Lineman of the Year (2018); Burlsworth Trophy (2019); 2× First-team All-Big Ten (2018, 2019); Third-team All-Big Ten (2017)

Career NFL statistics
- Total tackles: 16
- Sacks: 2.5
- Pass deflections: 1
- Stats at Pro Football Reference

Kenny Willekes (born July 22, 1997) is an American professional football defensive end for the Columbus Aviators of the United Football League (UFL). He played college football at Michigan State, and was three times named to the All-Big Ten team. He was selected by the Minnesota Vikings in the 2020 NFL draft.

== Early life ==
Willekes attended NorthPointe Christian High School in Grand Rapids, Michigan. He played linebacker and running back in high school. He had 423 tackles during his high school football career.

== College career ==
Willekes joined Michigan State University as a walk-on in 2015. He redshirted his first year and played in one game in 2016. In 2017, Willekes became a starter, starting 12 of 13 games. He finished the season with 72 tackles and seven sacks. In 2018, he was named the Big Ten Conference Smith-Brown Defensive Lineman of the Year after recording 78 tackles and 8.5 sacks. Willekes returned to Michigan State his senior year in 2019 rather than enter the 2019 NFL draft. During the season he broke Julian Peterson's school record for career tackles for loss. He was named the 2019 recipient of the Burlsworth Trophy on December 9, 2019, in Springdale, Arkansas, during a reception hosted by the Brandon Burlsworth Foundation in conjunction with the Springdale Rotary Club at the Springdale Convention Center.

== Professional career ==
Pre-draft measurables
Height	Weight	Arm length	Hand span	Wingspan	40-yard dash	10-yard split	20-yard split	Three-cone drill	Vertical jump	Broad jump	Bench press
6 ft 3 1/2 in (1.92 m)	264 lb (120 kg)	31 1/4 in (0.79 m)	9 1/2 in (0.24 m)	6 ft 5 7/8 in (1.98 m)	4.87 s	1.69 s	2.82 s	7.39 s	32.5 in (0.83 m)	9 ft 11 in (3.02 m)	32 reps
All values from NFL Combine

=== Minnesota Vikings ===
Willekes was selected by the Minnesota Vikings with the 225th pick in the seventh round of the 2020 NFL draft. He was placed on injured reserve on September 2, 2020.

On August 31, 2021, Willekes was waived by the Vikings and re-signed to the practice squad the next day. He was promoted to the active roster on January 8, 2022.

On June 2, 2022, Willekes was waived/injured by the Vikings and placed on injured reserve.

On May 23, 2023, Willekes was released.

=== Michigan Panthers ===
On December 8, 2023, Willekes signed with the Michigan Panthers of the United States Football League (USFL). He re-signed with the team on August 23, 2024.

=== Pittsburgh Steelers ===
On August 19, 2025, Willekes signed with the Pittsburgh Steelers. He was released by the Steelers on August 22.

=== Columbus Aviators ===
On January 12, 2026, Willekes was allocated to the Columbus Aviators of the United Football League (UFL).
