= The Imposter (2008 film) =

- Directed by: Daniel Millican
- Written by: Daniel Millican
- Produced by: Jeff Rodgers
- Starring: Kevin Max; Kerry Livgren; Jeff Deyo
- Cinematography: Ron Gonzalez
- Edited by: Daniel Millican
- Music by: Josh Goode
- Production company: Serendipitous Films
- Distributed by: Pure Flix Entertainment
- Release date: October 12, 2008
- Running time: 120 minutes
- Country: United States
- Language: English
- Budget: $1 million

The Imposter is a 2008 Christian film that was shot in January and February 2008 in and around Burleson, Texas. The movie stars Kevin Max, Kerry Livgren, and Jeff Deyo, and is produced by Jeff Rodgers and Daniel Millican, who also wrote and directed it.

== Plot ==
The Imposter deals with the lifestyle and subsequent breakdown of Christian rock singer Johnny C (Kevin Max), a talented singer addicted to oxycodone. After his wife and child leave him, he's fired from his band by its leader James (Jeff Deyo). Trying to make it on his own, Johnny gets swindled by a sleazy record producer and beaten up by his drug suppliers. Finally out of options, he travels home to see if his family will take him back.

== Cast ==
- Kevin Max as Johnny C
- Kerry Livgren as Proff
- Jeff Deyo as James
- Tom Wright as Homeless Man
- Arianne Martin as Tara
- Troy Baker as Jerome
- Daniel Millican as Tony
- Meredith Mauldin as Sydney
- Seth Kozak as Man Driving Truck
- Stephanie Mulligan as brain check girl, front desk

== Production ==
The film is a contemporary take on the parable of the Prodigal Son. It is Millican's fourth feature film. He wrote the script in mid-2007 and began to cast later in the same year. Troy Baker, the producer of the film, was a friend of Kevin Max and recommended him to Millican. In addition, Millican, Baker, and producer Jeff Rodgers approached Kerry Livgren and Jeff Deyo to round out the principals.

Veteran Hollywood actor Tom Wright has been in Millican's films. Millican relied heavily on director of photography Ron Gonzalez for the look, locations, and production value.

Troy Baker said the movie was terrible and he cope with filming this movie by playing "Uncharted."

== Release ==
The movie is released by Pure Flix Entertainment. The DVD's street date is February 23, 2010.

== Related projects ==
Four songs from Kevin Max's 2005 album The Imposter (album) were used in the film. In 2009 the filmmaker, Serendipitous Films, released an album of songs from the movie entitled Music From The Motion Picture The Imposter.
