= Meredith McCoy =

American actress

- Born: Meredith Rae Thompson; Fort Worth, Texas, U.S.
- Other names: Meredith Thompson; Meredith Mauldin
- Occupations: Actress; singer
- Years active: 1999–present
- Spouse: Michael Mauldin (m. 2005)
- Children: 3
- Musical career
- Genres: Jazz; Contemporary Christian
- Instrument: Vocals

Meredith Rae Mauldin (née Thompson), known professionally by her stage name Meredith McCoy, is an American actress and singer best known as the English voice of Android #18 in the Japanese anime Dragon Ball series as dubbed by Funimation. She also voiced Kagura Sohma in Fruits Basket (2001), Maria Ross in Fullmetal Alchemist, and Atsuko Urameshi in Yu Yu Hakusho.

== Early life ==
McCoy was born Meredith Rae Thompson. She is the step-daughter of the late Jaan Kalmes, a long-time radio personality in the Dallas/Fort Worth area and Rebecca Kalmes. She has 3 brothers (Andy, Paul and Isaac) and 2 sisters (Caroline and Elizabeth).

McCoy graduated from Collin County Community College and attended with fellow voice actor Laura Bailey.

== Personal life ==
In 2005, McCoy married Michael Mauldin, a former Texas Senate candidate and executive director of worship ministry UpperRoom. She and Mauldin have three children together: Ellia, Jonathan and Noah.

== Acting ==
McCoy's voice acting career began as Android #18 in the anime, Dragon Ball Z. She has also been the voice for several other anime characters including Kagura Sohma in Fruits Basket, Maria Ross in Fullmetal Alchemist, Kari Simmons in Case Closed and Lu Li Chang in Blue Gender.

McCoy has also acted in several films including: Graduation Day (2003), Saving Jessica Lynch (2003), The Deadbeat Club (2004), Life Is Not a Fairytale: The Fantasia Barrino Story (2006) and The Imposter (2008). McCoy was also featured in the Kenny Chesney music video for "There Goes My Life".

== Music ==
McCoy began her singing career as part of the singing group, Paper Dolls. She has sung with the Cary Richards orchestra, traveled all over the U.S. with Vince Vance and the Valiants, and has performed with Ricky Derek's Night 'Oh' Cabaret. She performed with Corner Pocket, a six-piece jazz/swing band based in Dallas, Texas, as a lead female vocalist and released their album, On Cue.

In 2008, McCoy released her debut album, Releasing Angels. Her song, Empty, was featured in the film, The Imposter. McCoy was featured on the opening theme song 'Believe' for the Funimation English dub of One Piece, Episodes 48-116. She has also been featured on several of The Upper Room's albums as a featured singer and previously sang with The Glory of Zion International Worship Team.

== Filmography ==
=== Anime ===
- Blue Gender – Lu Li Chang, Su Li Chang
- Burst Angel – Yoko (Ep. 5-6)
- Case Closed – Kari Simmons (Ep. 6), Mazy Mitchel (Ep. 43), Suzu Mikami (Ep. 63-64)
- Dragon Ball – Launch
- Dragon Ball GT – Android #18
- Dragon Ball Super – Android #18
- Dragon Ball Z – Android #18, Launch
- Dragon Ball Z: Battle of Gods – Android #18
- Dragon Ball Z: Resurrection 'F' – Android #18
- Dragon Ball Super: Super Hero – Android #18
- Fruits Basket (2001) – Kagura Sohma, Mai Gotou
- Fullmetal Alchemist – Maria Ross, Kyle (Ep. 9)
- Fullmetal Alchemist: Brotherhood – Maria Ross
- The Galaxy Railways – Karen (Ep. 4)
- Gunslinger Girl – Patricia (Ep. 8)
- Gunslinger Girl -Il Teatrino- – Patricia (Ep. 5, 7)
- Kiddy Grade – Bonita
- Kodocha – Jackie O
- Lupin III – Fujiko Mine
- Rumbling Hearts – Hitomi
- Yu Yu Hakusho – Atsuko Urameshi, Sasuga

=== Live action ===
- Graduation Day – Maddie
- Saving Jessica Lynch – Beth
- Midnight Clear – Caroler Gretchen
- The Imposter (2008) – Sydney

=== Video games ===
- Dragon Ball series – Android 18 (2002-2009, 2015–present), Launch
- Seven Samurai 20XX – Additional voices
- Spikeout: Battle Street – Additional voices

== Discography ==
Studio Albums

- Releasing Angels (2007) – debut studio album

Albums with Vince Vance & The Valiants

- We Don't Run (2003)

Albums with CornerPocket

- On Cue (2004)

Albums with The Glory of Zion International Worship Team

- Freed to Enter the Glory Realm (2010)
- Descending into Triump (2010)
- Contending for a New Beginning (2010)

Albums with The Upper Room

- God You Are (2014)
- Live from Upper Room (2016)
- Center of Your Love (2017)
- Moments (2018)
- To the One. Joy. (2018)
- The Turning (2022)

Anime song covers

- Android #18 – character song found on Dragon Ball Z American Soundtrack: Android 18 – The Android Sagas
- Daydream Generation – 5th ending theme song for Yu Yu Hakusho
- Believe – 2nd opening theme song for One Piece
- For Fruits Basket – English dub of opening theme song for Fruits Basket (2001)
