= NorthPointe Christian Schools =

Location
- 3101 Leonard Street NE; Grand Rapids, Michigan 49525; United States; 42°59′2″N 85°35′38″W

Information
- School type: Private Christian
- Religious affiliation: Christian
- Established: 1972
- Founder: George Berends
- Superintendent: Todd Tolsma
- High School Principal: Tom Molenkamp
- Middle School Principal: Megan Wilink
- Elementary School Principal: Karen Vanderberg
- Teaching staff: 66 (on a FTE basis)
- Grades: 3s - 12th Grade
- Enrollment: 1,150 (2022-2023)
- Student to teacher ratio: 23:1
- Colors: Royal blue, yellow, white, gold
- Athletics conference: Ottawa-Kent Conference
- Nickname: Mustangs
- Accreditation: North Central Accreditation, Christian Schools International
- Publication: The Advantage (Newsletter)
- Website: www.npchristian.org

NorthPointe Christian Schools is a private Christian school located on the North East side of Grand Rapids, Michigan. NorthPointe Christian Schools is committed to 'equipping students to impact their world for Jesus Christ'. This commitment is accomplished through academics, spiritual life, athletics, and extracurricular activities.

== History ==
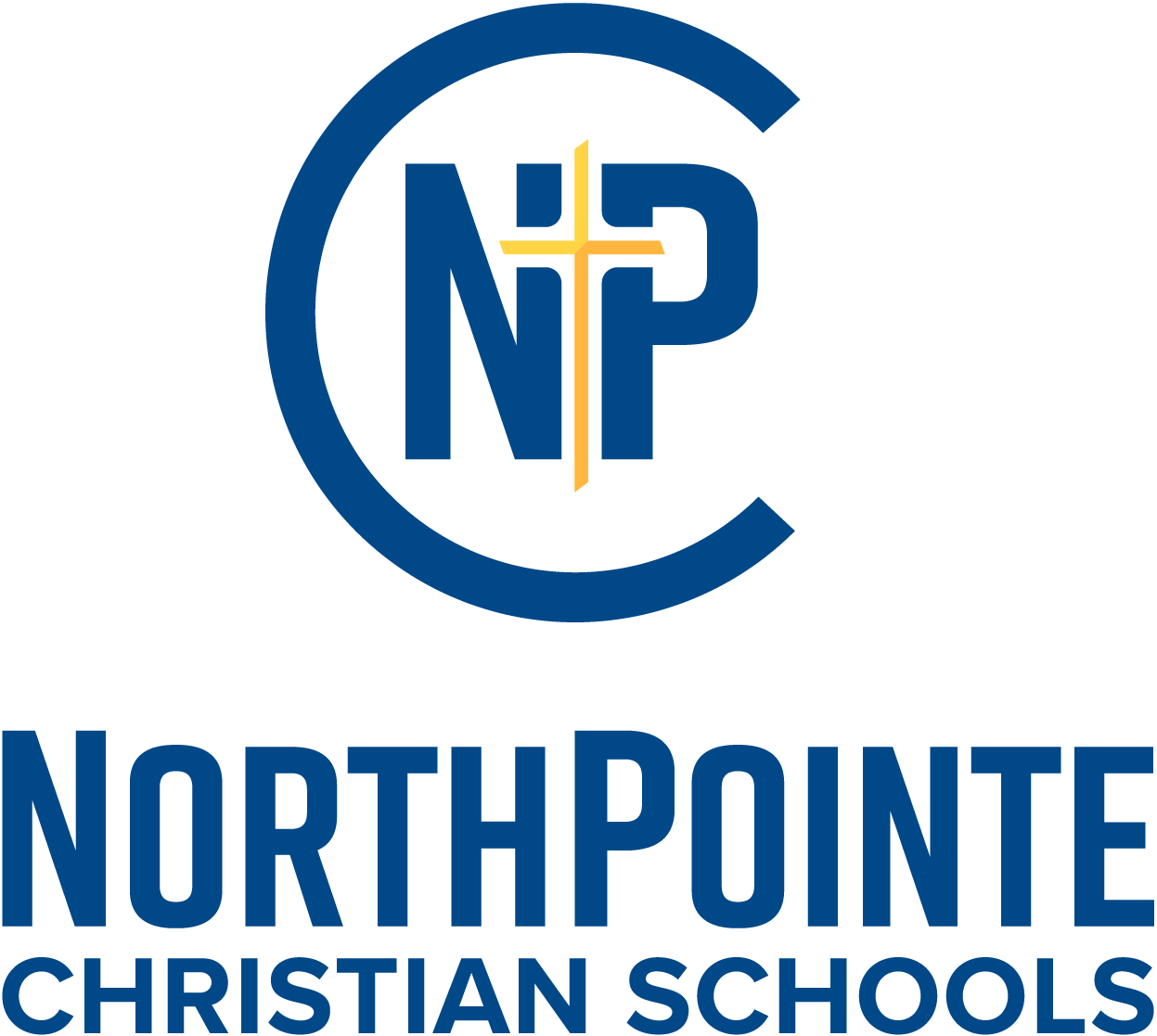

NorthPointe Christian Schools was founded as Grand Rapids Baptist Academy in 1972, with 90 students Kindergarten through 8th grade attending. In the spring of 1973, 19 acres of property was purchased on Leonard Street, where an 18,000 square foot building was constructed by Visser Brothers Construction. The Leonard Street campus opened in September 1973, with 280 students in attendance from Kindergarten through 10th grade.

From 1974 to 1976, portable classrooms were purchased, and Crestview Elementary School was leased from Grand Rapids Public Schools, opening its doors to 300 elementary-age students. The graduating class of 1976 (the school's first class) had 14 graduates. During the 1978–1979 school year, Crestview Elementary School was purchased by Grand Rapids Baptist Academy. By 1982, Grand Rapids Baptist Academy had 4 elementary campuses (Crestview and 3 satellite schools), and 125 new high school students were added, alongside a special education program. A December 1982 letter reported 1,194 students enrolled in Kindergarten through 12th grade.

In 1990, Grand Rapids Baptist Academy updated their Statement of Purpose: “Grand Rapids Baptist Academy exists in partnership with the home and the church to train each student to integrate the absolute truth of God into every area of life. The primary goal of the Academy is to equip students to strive to be fully mature in Christ; so that students may manifest a Christlikeness in character, conduct, and knowledge to the world in which they live.”

The school's name was later changed to Grand Rapids Baptist Schools in 1996, to avoid confusion with local charter 'academies'. By 1999–2000, Grand Rapids Baptist Schools had been dually accredited by North Central Association and the Association of Christian Schools International, and became a member of Christian Schools International. Throughout the 1990s and early 2000s, new facilities were added to the school, including athletic fields, a media center, additional classrooms, a cafeteria, locker rooms, and offices.

In 2004, the school announced the change of its name from Grand Rapids Baptist Schools to NorthPointe Christian Schools. In 2006, Jim Hofman became the Superintendent, a football program was started, and homeschool options were offered. In 2008, the Love, Mission and Image mandates were integrated into the NorthPointe Christian Schools curriculum. During the same year, the Home & School Hybrid Program started, welcoming 11 students into a 3rd-5th grade class.

In 2011, NorthPointe Christian Schools opened their Spanish Immersion program and moved their 6th grade students from the Preschool and Elementary campus to the Middle and High School campus. During the following years, childcare programs opened, a new technology initiative was announced, and Joel Westa was hired as Superintendent in 2013. NorthPointe Christian Schools announced their largest graduating class (102 graduates) in 2015, along with the hiring of Todd Tolsma as Head of Schools. In 2016, four new academic programs were launched: Nature-Based Preschool, Intergenerational Preschool, Big Picture Learning, and Spanish Immersion at the Middle School campus. In 2018, the Forward in Faith Capital Campaign was launched, with the goal of building additional classrooms and a fine arts wing.

As of the 2022–2023 school year, enrollment from 3s to 12th Grade was 1,150 students.

== Academics ==
NorthPointe Christian Schools offers a variety of academic programs for students age 3 through 12th grade:

- Early Childhood (3s - Developmental Kindergarten) - English Preschool, Spanish Immersion Preschool, Nature-Based Preschool, Developmental Kindergarten
- Elementary (Kindergarten - 5th Grade) - English, Spanish Immersion, Home & School Hybrid
- Middle School (6th - 8th Grade) - English, Spanish Immersion, Home & School Hybrid
- High School (9th - 12th Grade)- English, Big Picture Learning, college dual enrollment for juniors and seniors

Each faculty or staff member at NorthPointe Christian Schools is a professing Christian. In addition, NorthPointe Christian's teachers have an average of 12 years of experience and are certified in their area of speciality. The current student to teacher ratio is 23:1.

== Spiritual Life ==
The Bible is the core of academics and student life at NorthPointe Christian Schools. Each teacher is a professing Christian, and over 100 churches are represented across the student body. In addition to integrating the Bible throughout all subjects, daily Bible class is required for all students at every grade level. All students also participate in weekly chapels, Scripture memory, Spiritual Emphasis Weeks, small groups, service projects, and other opportunities for spiritual mentorship.

== Athletics ==
NorthPointe Christian Mustangs are a member of the Ottawa-Kent Conference. The school colors are royal blue, white and gold. The following MHSAA sanctioned sports are offered:

- Baseball (boys)
- Basketball (girls and boys)
- Bowling (girls and boys)
- Competitive Cheer (girls)
- Cross Country (girls and boys) - Girls State Champions - 2006, 2007
- Football (boys)
- Golf (girls and boys) - Girls State Champions - 2019; Boys State Champions - 1993, 1996, 2018
- Soccer (girls and boys)
- Softball (girls
- Swim and Dive (girls)
- Tennis (girls and boys) - Boys State Champions - 2006
- Track and Field (girls and boys)
- Volleyball (girls)
- Wrestling (boys)

== Extracurricular Activities ==
NorthPointe Christian Schools offers the following courses, programs and extracurricular activities to aid in students' academic

- Fine Arts - band, choir and orchestra
- Theatrical Productions
- National Honor Society
- Robotics
- Service Projects
- Mission Trips
- January Term classes
- Middle School Marketplace

== Demographics ==
The demographic breakdown of the 952 students enrolled in grades K-12 for 2022-2023 was as follows:

- Asian - 2.62%
- African American - 3.67%
- Caucasian - 66.7%
- Hispanic - 4.83%
- Native American - 0.21%
- Other / Unclassified - 21.95%
- Pacific Islanders - 0%

== Notable Alumni & Staff ==
- Katie Feenstra, WNBA basketball player and head women's basketball coach at Cornerstone University
- Kevin Max, member of Christian band DC Talk.
- Chad Curtis, professional baseball player; former athletic director and weight training instructor at the school
- Kenny Willekes, Defensive End at Michigan State University & Burlsworth Trophy recipient (2015-2019); current Defensive End for the Minnesota Vikings (2019–Present)
