= Cotes d'Armor (True Rebels) =

Cotes d' Armor (true rebels)

Studio album by Kevin Max
- Released: July 27, 2010
- Genre: Rock, electronica
- Length: 62:10
- Label: dPulse

Kevin Max chronology
Crashing Gates (2008)	Cotes d' Armor (true rebels) (2010)	Fiefdom of Angels-Side One (2012)

Alternative cover

Côtes d'Armor (True Rebels) is an album by Kevin Max, released on August 24, 2010 on the record label dPulse Records. On July 27, 2010, a digital download was made available for those who pre-ordered the album. On September 14, 2010, an expanded edition was released in digital format. The expanded release contained 12 new remixes and demos of tracks appearing on the album and removed "2099" and "Magadhi Prakrit (Slow)".

== Track listing ==
1. "On Yer Bike!" – 5:09
2. "2099" – 0:51
3. "Out of the Wild" – 3:40
4. "Walking Through Walls (Just to Get to You)" – 4:56
5. "Even When It Hurts" – 4:06
6. "Magadhi Prakrit (Slow)" – 2:16
7. "Baby, I'm Your Man" – 3:48
8. "We Love Dangerous" – 5:28
9. "Train to Transylvania" – 4:01
10. "Future Love Song" – 4:42
11. "Your Beautiful Mind" – 4:38
12. "Traveler" – 4:50
13. "Abyssmal (More Than This)" – 1:50
14. "Saint of Lonely Hearts" – 2:50
15. "Death of CCM" – 5:54
16. "Unholy Triad" – 3:02

== Expanded edition track listing ==
1. "On Yer Bike!"
2. "Out of the Wild"
3. "Walking Through Walls (Just to Get to You)"
4. "Even When It Hurts"
5. "Baby, I'm Your Man"
6. "We Love Dangerous"
7. "Train to Transylvania"
8. "Future Love Song"
9. "Your Beautiful Mind"
10. "Traveler"
11. "Abyssmal (More Than This)"
12. "Saint of Lonely Hearts"
13. "Death of CCM (Cybergenic Cyclic Machines)"
14. "Unholy Triad"
15. "Out of the Wild (Graham Crabb Spook Mix)"
16. "Out of the Wild (Graham Crabb Mix)"
17. "Baby, I'm Your Man (Graham Crabb Mix)"
18. "Future Love Song (Graham Crabb Mix)"
19. "Saint of Lonely Hearts (Graham Crabb Mix)"
20. "Traveler (Graham Crabb Mix)"
21. "Out of The Wild (Knapsackheroes! Mix)"
22. "Your Beautiful Mind (Robert Bond Mix)"
23. "Walking Through Walls (Demo)"
24. "On Yer Bike! (Demo)"
25. "Walking Through Walls (Reconstructed Instrumental)"
26. "We Love Dangerous (Unfinished Electro-Rock Version)"
