= Help Is On the Way (Maybe Midnight) =

2021 single by TobyMac

Single by TobyMac

from the album Life After Death
- Released: February 19, 2021
- Genre: CCM; pop rock
- Length: 3:01
- Label: ForeFront; Capitol CMG
- Songwriter(s): Micah Kuiper; Toby McKeehan
- Producer(s): Micah Kuiper; Toby McKeehan

TobyMac singles chronology
"I'm Sorry (A Lament)" (2020)	"Help Is On the Way (Maybe Midnight)" (2021)	"Like You" (2021)

Music videos
- "Help Is On the Way (Maybe Midnight)" on YouTube
- "Help Is On the Way (Maybe Midnight)" (Live) on YouTube

"Help Is On the Way (Maybe Midnight)" is a song by American Contemporary Christian artist TobyMac as the third single from his ninth studio album Life After Death. The song was released on February 19, 2021. TobyMac collaborated with Micah Kuiper in songwriting and production of the single.

"Help Is On the Way (Maybe Midnight)" peaked at No. 24 on Billboard's Bubbling Under Hot 100 chart, and at No. 3 on the US Hot Christian Songs chart. The music video of the song won the GMA Dove Award for Short Form Video of the Year at the 2021 GMA Dove Awards.

== Background ==
TobyMac released "Help Is On the Way (Maybe Midnight)" with its accompanying music video on February 19, 2021. TobyMac shared the story behind the song, saying:

I wrote "Help is on the Way (Maybe Midnight)" after a season in the valley of sad songs. With a broken heart after losing my firstborn son and stepping almost immediately into quarantine everything was dark. I woke up one day and turned to the Psalms. I read that 'God is rolling up His sleeves.' What beautiful imagery. This picture turned me from having hope to yelling it from the rooftops. The God of all creation is rolling up His sleeves on our behalf. What a promise. We are not forgotten, not at all.

== Composition ==
"Help Is on the Way (Maybe Midnight)" is composed in the key of C♯ minor with a tempo of 142 beats per minute and a musical time signature of 4/4.

== Reception ==
=== Critical response ===
Jonathan Andre of 365 Days of Inspiring Media gave a positive review of the song, concluding: "A song that has reminded me of help being on the way during the moments where we so desperately need it, well done Toby for this track, a meaningful one, and one that can remind us of the very hope we have in Christ, that help comes for the weary and downtrodden, and the seemingly all-together, alike."

=== Accolades ===
Awards
Year	Organization	Award	Result	Ref
2021	GMA Dove Awards	Short Form Video of the Year	Won	

Year-end lists
Publication	Accolade	Rank	Ref.
365 Days Of Inspiring Media	Top 50 Music Videos of 2021	13	
Jesus Freak Hideout	2022 Staff Picks: Alex Caldwell's Song Picks	4	

== Commercial performance ==
"Help Is on the Way (Maybe Midnight)" debuted at No. 11 on the US Hot Christian Songs chart dated March 6, 2021, concurrently charting at No. 1 on the Christian Digital Song Sales chart. It went on to peak at number 3 on the chart, and spent a total of twenty-six consecutive weeks on the Hot Christian Songs Chart.

The song debuted on the Christian Airplay chart dated February 27, 2021, at No. 35. "Help Is on the Way (Maybe Midnight)" reached number one on the Christian Airplay chart dated June 13, 2021, becoming TobyMac's tenth chart-topping entry.

== Music videos ==
The official music video of "Help Is on the Way (Maybe Midnight)" was published on TobyMac's YouTube channel on February 19, 2021. The music video was directed by Eric Welch, and it features TobyMac's son, Judah McKeehan, as a special guest.

TobyMac released the official live performance video of "Help Is on the Way (Maybe Midnight)" recorded during the Drive-In Theater Tour stops in Mt. Sterling, Kentucky, Dayton, Ohio, and Summersville, Kentucky locations, on June 11, 2021.

== Personnel ==
Adapted from AllMusic.

- Chris Gehringer — mastering engineer
- Serban Ghenea — mixing
- Micah Kuiper — producer
- TobyMac — primary artist, producer

== Charts ==
=== Weekly charts ===
Weekly chart performance for "Help Is on the Way (Maybe Midnight)"
Chart (2021)	Peak position
US Bubbling Under Hot 100 Singles (Billboard)	24
US Christian Songs (Billboard)	3
US Christian Airplay (Billboard)	1
US Christian AC (Billboard)	1
US Digital Song Sales (Billboard)	15

=== Year-end charts ===
Year-end chart performance for "Help Is on the Way (Maybe Midnight)"
Chart (2021)	Position
US Christian Songs (Billboard)	9
US Christian Airplay (Billboard)	4
US Christian AC (Billboard)	2
US Weekend 22	1
US Weekend Top 20	4

== Certifications ==
Region	Certification	Certified units/sales
United States (RIAA)	Gold	500,000^{‡}
^{‡} Sales+streaming figures based on certification alone.

== Release history ==
Release dates and formats for "Help Is on the Way (Maybe Midnight)"
Region	Date	Format	Label	Ref.
Various	February 19, 2021	Digital download; streaming	ForeFront Records	
United States	March 12, 2021	Christian radio	Capitol CMG	
