= Kevin Max =

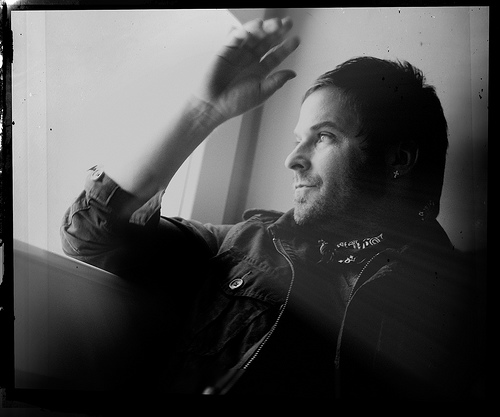
- Max in July 2008

Background information
- Born: Kevin Max Smith; August 17, 1967 (age 59)
- Origin: Grand Rapids, Michigan, U.S.
- Genres: Christian rock, alternative rock
- Instruments: Piano, vocals
- Years active: 1988–present
- Labels: Northern, ForeFront, Motion, Blind Thief Recordings
- Website: kevinmax.com

Kevin Max Smith (born August 17, 1967) is an American singer, songwriter, painter, and poet. He is best known for being a member of the Christian pop group dc Talk. As a solo artist following the band going on hiatus, he has recorded 12 full-length studio albums, including a Christmas album. From 2012 until 2014, he was the lead singer of the band Audio Adrenaline.

== Early life ==
Adopted as a baby to Max and Elaine Smith, Kevin Smith was raised in Grand Rapids, Michigan. Kevin went to high school at Grand Rapids Baptist (now Northpointe Christian). He went to college at Liberty University in Lynchburg Virginia. Kevin Max Smith legally changed his name to "Kevin Max" in 1997 as a tribute to his adoptive father, Max Smith.

== Career ==
=== dc Talk years (1989–2000) ===
While at Liberty University, he met fellow dc Talk bandmates Toby McKeehan ("tobyMac") and Michael Tait. They formed DC Talk in 1988 and went on to achieve great success in both Christian and mainstream music, winning numerous Dove Awards and Grammys. The band went on to win four Grammy Awards and 16 GMA Dove Awards. The band went on hiatus in 2000 as each member pursued their own solo careers.

=== Going solo (2001–2012) ===
Max's first solo album, Stereotype Be, released on August 28, 2001, was praised by Allmusic for "[combining] pop, rock, and world music to create a versatile and intriguing project.". Artists Adrian Belew and Tony Levin of King Crimson, Larry Norman and drummer Matt Chamberlain contributed to the album along with Max's collaborator Erick Cole. It became a turning point in Max's career, as the project was a foreshadowing of Max's own brand of alternative music.

While Stereotype Be has developed a considerable cult following, it was not well received in the Christian music market. Soon after its release, Max was dropped from his Christian label, ForeFront Records. Undeterred, Max began to slowly build his solo career through live shows and word-of-mouth. He released independent albums via his website, including Between the Fence & the Universe and a spoken-word collaboration with Adrian Belew, Raven Songs 101, both in 2004.

In fall of 2004, Max's word-of-mouth strategy finally began to pay off. He played the title role in the Visalia Theatre Company / Hutson-Cavale Productions revival of the classic Tim Rice and Andrew Lloyd Webber musical Joseph and the Amazing Technicolor Dreamcoat. Later that year, he signed a new deal with Northern Records and released a second full-length album, The Imposter on October 11, 2005. He released a Christmas album, Holy Night, in time for the 2005 Christmas season.

In April 2007, Infinity Music announced that Max had been signed to their label for his next project. The Blood was released on December 26, 2007. According to Max, "The Blood is not a classic hymns cover project or a white/homogenized version of black gospel or soul music. It's a sensitive and stylized adaption of the music that was at the root of rock and roll, blues and popular culture."

Max has attempted to create a name for himself apart from DC Talk. While he does not shy away from vocally defending his faith, he has expressed a desire to create art with a universal appeal. He insists, "My music is for a Christian and a Buddhist to pick up and still enjoy, as well as for an atheist. But it is there to prod and ask questions: What is my worldview? What do I believe in, and why do I believe it?"

In February 2008, Max starred in the independent film The Imposter. In the film, Kevin plays a character named "Johnny C", a singer who becomes addicted to OxyContin and loses his family and job as a Christian music star. The movie also features Tom Wright and Troy Baker.

In 2009, Max released Crashing Gates through dPulse records. It was critically praised as returning to his experimental side in the rock and pop genres.

In February 2011, Max formed a supergroup with Broadway singer Tony Vincent and longtime collaborator David Larring. The band was tentatively named "Bad Omens". The three were writing songs when Vincent decided to drop out to pursue theater interests, leaving the new band in a state of pause. A song, "Control", can be heard on Max's SoundCloud.

On February 27, 2012, Max released Fiefdom of Angels-Side One, the first of two albums to coincide with the forthcoming novel series of the same name. The overall project were chosen covers of well known 80s rock songs, with one Kevin Max original and a Muse cover set to lush orchestration. Ology Magazine describes the work as "a new wave mix-tape played at full volume through the Sistine Chapel".

=== Audio Adrenaline years (2012–2014) ===
In August 2012, Max became the new lead vocalist in a reunited Audio Adrenaline. He continued with the band until June 2014, when the band opted to take a different creative direction.

Max has also contributed vocally to other artists projects including Mark Heard, Jonathan Thulin, Marc Martel, Michael McDonald, 3kStatic, and many others.

=== Return to solo career (2014–present) ===
In late 2014, Max released two singles, "Infinite" and "Light Me Up". On March 10, 2015, the album Broken Temples was released.

In 2015, Max released another studio album of covers of pop standards Starry Eyes Surprise. Max released Playing Games With the Shadow in 2016, Serve Somebody in 2017, and both AWOL and Romeo Drive in 2018.

In 2020, Max released spoken word album Radio Teknika with electronic pioneers 3Kstatic and in the same summer released Revisiting This Planet a tribute to legendary rock artist Larry Norman. Later that year, Max announced a new indie rock band called Sad Astronauts.

In 2022, Max released the album FANTASY with co-production by Old Bear Records, Chris Hoisington. Singles Pure Imagination and David Bowie's As The World Falls Down were also released.

A Kickstarter campaign was successful in supporting the new album Winter Woods to be released before December 25, 2022.

In a statement made on his Facebook page, Max announced that he would be creating an album with Father John Misty Bassist, Eli Thomson in the spring of 2023. Elijah Thomson was also featured on Max's album The Imposter.

== Personal life ==
In 1997, Max married Alayna Bennett. They divorced in 2003. In April 2005, he married Amanda Lynn MacDonald, but stated in an interview that earlier the two had "a secret wedding and marriage vows were spoken and we had binding agreement together in front of a spiritual leader, but we decided to go with the public ceremony a little bit later." They have four children. In August 2010, Max and family moved back to Grand Rapids, Michigan. In 2016, Kevin Max bought a farm an hour southwest of Nashville in Centerville, Tennessee, and called it "Blind Thief Farm and Studio". In 2018, the Max family moved to the Westhaven community in Franklin, Tennessee. The Max family frequently tours the states in a Winnebago/Mercedes RV titled Bilbo Waggons. Following a divorce from Amanda Lynn MacDonald in October 2025, Max married Candace Thompson in February 2026.

Max became vocal on social media about his politics and spiritual deconstruction in 2019 and 2020 during the pandemic. On the song "Shock Ra" from his 2020 album Radio Teknika, he proclaims himself a "gothic, hippie, inclusive, Jesus freak wanting peace", alongside other political commentary on the album. Politically, Max has identified as an anarchist and expressed support for a number of left-wing causes. By 2021, he specifically identified as an "exvangelical", though he rejected claims that he was no longer a Christian and said that he followed "the Universal Christ".

== Discography ==
=== With dc Talk ===
- DC Talk (1989)
- Nu Thang (1990)
- Free at Last (1992)
- Jesus Freak (1995)
- Live in Concert: Welcome to the Freak Show (1997)
- Supernatural (1998)
- Intermission: the Greatest Hits (2000)
- Solo (EP) (2001)
- Free at Last: The Movie (2002)

=== Solo ===
Studio albums

Year	Title	Peak chart positions	
Year	Title	US Christ	US Heat
2001	Stereotype Be: Released: August 28, 2001; Label: ForeFront Records	12	20
2005	The Imposter: Released: October 11, 2005; Label: Northern Records	—	—
2005	Holy Night: Released: November 15, 2005; Label: Northern Records	—	—
2007	The Blood: Released: December 18, 2007; Label: Infinity Music	—	—
2010	Cotes d'Armor (True Rebels): Released: August 24, 2010; Label: dPulse Recordings	—	—
2015	Broken Temples: Released: March 10, 2015; Label: Blind Thief Recordings/Motion Records	32	22
2015	Starry Eyes Surprise: Released: October 30, 2015; Label: Blind Thief Recordings	—	—
2016	Playing Games With The Shadow: Released: June 10, 2016; Label: Blind Thief Recordings	—	—
2017	Serve Somebody: Released: July 7, 2017; Label: Gotee Records/SMLXL	—	—
2018	AWOL: Released: June 8, 2018; Label: Blind Thief Recordings	—	—
2018	Romeo Drive: Released: October 31, 2018; Label: Blind Thief Recordings	—	—
2020	Radio Teknika: Released: July 3, 2020; Label: Blind Thief Recordings	—	—
2020	Revisiting This Planet: Released: November 20, 2020; Label: Blind Thief Recordings	—	—
2022	Winter Woods: Released: December 25, 2022; Label: Old Bear Records	—	—

Compilation albums

- Black Sheep of the Fold (2019)
- Frozen in Time Since Two Thousand and Nine (2023)

Extended plays

- Between the Fence and the Universe (2004)
- Crashing Gates (2008)
- Fiefdom of Angels: Side One (2012)
- Fantasy (2022)
- Horror (2024)

=== Other notable projects ===
- (1994) At the Foot of Heaven: a Mini Audio Book (spoken word, Starsong)
- (2010) Traveler (Mora Brothers Remixes) (dPulse Recordings)
- (2010) Unholy Triad (dPulse Recordings)
- (2010) Unholy Triad Remix (dPulse Recordings)
- (2015) Same Wavelength (Kevin Max & Service Unicorn) (Blind Thief Recordings)

=== With Audio Adrenaline ===
- (2013) Kings & Queens (Fair Trade Services)

=== Collaborations ===
- (1995) In the Bleak Mid-Winter from Noel, (as Kevin Smith), produced by Steve Hindalong & Derri Dougherty
- (1996) Lonely Moon (from Strong Hand of Love: A Tribute to Mark Heard)
- (1996) Louie's Solo Petra cover with Passafist, from Never Say Dinosaur)
- (1997) The Canticle of the Plains, (musical written by Rich Mullins)
- (1998) Save Me (from Awesome God: A Tribute to Rich Mullins)
- (1998) Birthday The Beatles cover, from ForeFront Records' Ten: The Birthday Album)
- (1999) There's Something About That Name (with Sonicflood, from Listen Louder)
- (2002) Just an Illusion (from Songs For a Purpose Driven Life, Maranatha! Music)
- (2003, 2009) Raven Songs 101 (collaboration with Adrian Belew, Blind Thief Publishing)
- (2006) Help Me Rhonda (from Making God Smile: An Artists' Tribute to the Songs of Beach Boy Brian Wilson)
- (2006) The Day Is Dawning (with Jill Phillips), from The Prayer Of Jabez...A Worship Experience
- (2007) Blue (feature appearance for Manic Drive, Whiplash Records)
- (2009) Sugar Evolver (with 3kStatic, from Evolver, Sony Music)
- (2010) Come Together Now (Music City Unites for Haiti) (charity single, relief effort led by Michael W. Smith)
- (2011) I Am Second (feature appearance for Newsboys on God's Not Dead, Inpop)
- (2011) A Name, A Day (from "of Shadows and Scars"] with Atlantic
- (2013) Man On Fire (feature appearance for Newsboys on Restart: Deluxe Edition, Inpop)
- (2013) The Living Years (feature appearance for Newsboys on Restart, Inpop)
- (2019) Love One Another (feature appearance for Newsboys on United, Fair Trade)
- (2020) Under Pressure (feature appearance with Marc Martel)
- (2022) You Did Not Have A Home (from Bellsburg album release) Old Bear Records)

=== Guest appearances ===
- Marc Martel - "Under Pressure "
- Michael McDonald – "Ain't That Peculiar"
- Audio Adrenaline – "My World View"
- Manic Drive – "Blue"
- Jimmy Abegg – "These Daughters of Mine"
- Rich Mullins – "To Tell Them"
- TobyMac – "Atmosphere (Remix)" on 2004's Welcome to Diverse City
- SONICFLOOd – "Something About That Name"
- Raze – "Forgive Me"
- Newsboys – "God's Not Dead (Like a Lion)", "I Am Second", "Man on Fire", "The Living Years", and "Love One Another"
- Michael Sweet - "This Time" on 2014's I'm Not Your Suicide
- tobyMac – "Love Feels Like" on 2015's This Is Not a Test
- Philippa Hanna – "Embers" on 2016's Speed of Light
- TobyMac – "Space" on 2022's Life After Death

=== Singles ===
Year	Single	Album	
2001	"Be"	Stereotype Be	
2001	"Existence"	Stereotype Be	
2001	"You"	Stereotype Be	
2005	"Seek"	Between the Fence & the Universe	
2005	"Sanctuary"	The Imposter	
2006	"Confessional Booth"	The Imposter	
2007	"Run on for a Long Time" (featuring Chris Sligh)	The Blood	
2007	"The Cross" (featuring dc Talk)	The Blood	
2009	"Traveler"	Cotes d'Armor (True Rebels)	
2010	"On Yer Bike!"	Cotes d'Armor (True Rebels)	
2010	"Unholy Triad"	Cotes d'Armor (True Rebels)	
2010	"Exorcist"	non-album single	
2011	"Take a Bow"	Fiefdom of Angels: Side One	
2012	"Kings & Queens"	Kings & Queens (Audio Adrenaline)	
2013	"Believer"	Kings & Queens (Audio Adrenaline)	
2013	"King of the Comebacks"	Kings & Queens (Audio Adrenaline)	
2014	"He Moves You Move"	Kings & Queens (Audio Adrenaline)	
2014	"Infinite" (featuring Rachael Lampa)	Broken Temples	
2014	"Light Me Up"	Broken Temples	
2014	"Cave of a Million Songs"	Praise and Arrows (soundtrack)	
2015	"Clear"	Broken Temples	
2016	"Girl with the Tiger Eyes"	Playing Games with the Shadow	
2017	"Let the Day Begin"	Serve Somebody	
2017	"Plans"	non-album single	
2018	"Moonracer"	AWOL	
2019	"Have Yourself a Merry Little Christmas" |(with Michael Tait)	non-album single	
2021	"A Pearl To Hide"	non-album single	
2022	"As The World Falls Down'	"Pure Imagination"	"Coventry Carol"

=== Filmography ===
Music videos

- (2001) Existence (ForeFront Records)
- (2003) Seek (Live) (Northern Records)
- (2010) Carry On My Wayward Son (with Kerry Livgren of Kansas) (Unknown)
- (2015) Moon Over Bourbon Street (Blind Thief Recordings)
- (2016) Girl With the Tiger Eyes (Blind Thief Recordings)
- (2018) Moonracer (Blind Thief Recordings)

Film

- (2010) The Imposter
- (2014) As Dreamers Do

=== Books ===
- (1994) At the Foot of Heaven (poetry/artwork, Starsong)
- (2001) Unfinished Work (autobiography, T. Nelson)
- (2002) Slip of the Ink
- (2003) The Detritus of Dorian Gray (poetry, Blind Thief Publishing)
- (2004) Divine Erotica
- (2005) PO/ET/RY (poetry, Blind Thief Publishing)
- (2014) Fiefdom of Angels

== See also ==
- dc Talk - Christian Band, 1988–2001 with tobyMac, Kevin Max and Michael Tait
- tobyMac - Solo artist, former bandmate in dc Talk
- Newsboys - Christian band (lead singer Michael Tait 2009–2024)
- Adrian Belew - guitarist, producer, frequent collaborator
- Tait - Band of former dcTalk member Michael Tait.
