= Stereotype Be =

Studio album by Kevin Max
- Released: August 28, 2001
- Recorded: 2000–2001
- Studios: Ocean Way, Nashville; The Bennett House, Franklin; Sound Kitchen, Franklin; Royaltone, Los Angeles; Channel-Land, Santa Rosa
- Genres: Art pop; experimental rock
- Length: 60:59
- Label: ForeFront
- Producers: Kevin Max; Adrian Belew

Kevin Max chronology
At the Foot of Heaven: a Mini Audio Book] (1994)	Stereotype Be (2001)	Raven Songs 101 (2003)

Professional ratings
Review scores
Source	Rating
AllMusic	4/5 stars
Christianity Today	favorable
Cross Rhythms	8/10 stars
Jesus Freak Hideout	4/5 stars
The Phantom Tollbooth	5/5 stars

Stereotype Be is the solo debut album of Kevin Max. The album blends progressive rock, world music (particularly Middle Eastern), spoken word, and traditional pop, with spiritual lyrics.

== Track listing ==
Album release
No.	Title	Writer(s)	Length
1.	"Return of the Singer"	Kevin Max, Mark Lee Townsend	3:49
2.	"Existence"	Max, Townsend	4:13
3.	"Be"	Erick Cole, Max	3:47
4.	"Angel with No Wings"	Cole, Max	4:22
5.	"Shaping Space"	Max	4:00
6.	"Dead End Moon"	Max, Townsend	5:32
7.	"Union of the Soul"	Max	1:15
8.	"The Secret Circle"	Cole, Max	3:56
9.	"I Don't Belong"	Max	3:33
10.	"Blind"	Cole, Max	5:19
11.	"On and On"	Cole, Max	4:20
12.	"Her Game"	Max	4:08
13.	"Deconstructing Venus"	Cole, Max	5:11
14.	"I Went Over the Edge of the World" (includes hidden song "You")	Max	7:34
Total length:			60:59

== Demo Sessions track listing ==
1. "My Sweet Lord" (George Harrison) – 4:32
2. "Shaping Space" – 4:05
3. "Deconstructing Venus" – 5:01
4. "Dead End Moon" – 5:23
5. "End of the Beginning" – 6:06
6. "Angel Without Wings" – 4:29
7. "Mojo Reckoning" – 5:05
8. "The Revolution" – 3:52
9. "Burn Me Up" – 4:43
10. "Leaving the Planet" – 4:10
11. "Dark Night" – 4:22
12. "You" - 4:24

The working title of the album was given as London Cowboy in February 2001 before its eventual renaming.

"End of the Beginning" was revamped by Max and used as the second track of his 2012 EP, Fiefdom of Angels-Side One.

In 2015 Kevin released Stereotype Be-Sides which included these tracks and others not before heard.

== Personnel ==
- Kevin Max – vocals, tambourine, backing vocals (1, 9), keyboards (4, 5, 12, 14.1), acoustic piano (10)
- Mark Lee Townsend – programming (1, 2, 6)
- Jamie Kenney – programming (11)
- George Cocchini – guitars (1, 2)
- J.R. McNeely – acoustic guitar (2)
- Adrian Belew – sitar (2), guitars (3, 8, 10, 13, 14.1), pedal steel guitar (3), string arrangements (6, 8, 10, 12), koto (10), electric guitars (12), Roland V-drums (12), vibraphone (12)
- Will Owsley – guitars (3, 4, 5, 9), acoustic guitar (4, 5, 11), backing vocals (9)
- Erick Cole – acoustic guitar (4, 5, 11), guitars (10, 14.1), additional guitars (13)
- John Mark Painter – guitars (6), theremin (6), baglama (6), string arrangements (6, 8, 10, 12), flugelhorn (10, 11), electric guitar (11), slide guitar (11), bass (11)
- Tony Levin – bass (1–6, 8, 9, 10, 12, 13, 14.1), Chapman Stick (6)
- Matt Chamberlain – drums (1–6, 8, 9, 10, 12, 13, 14.1), percussion
- Scott Lenox – loops (8)
- Lee Thornburg – trumpet, flugelhorn, French horn
- Larry Norman – Jew's harp (11), backing vocals (11)
- Alisa Gyse – backing vocals (1)
- Stacy "Coffee" Jones – bridge rap (2)

Handclaps on "Blind"

- Adrian Belew, Matt Chamberlain, Erick Cole, Graham Elvis, Tony Levin and Kevin Max

== Production ==
- Adrian Belew – producer
- Kevin Max – producer, art direction
- David Bach – A&R
- Kevin Latchney – engineer
- J.R. McNeely – engineer, mixing
- Ted Jensen – mastering at Sterling Sound (New York City, New York)
- Susannah Parrish – creative coordinator
- Scott McDaniel – art direction
- Neal Ashby – design
- Danny Clinch – photography
- CL Entertainment, Inc. – management
