= Farrell Spence =

Farrell Spence is a Canadian Roots/Americana singer and songwriter from Vancouver, British Columbia, Canada.

== Career ==
In April 2007, Spence released her first CD, A Town Called Hell. It received positive reviews from various UK, Irish and American music magazines who focus on the Americana/Bluegrass scene. In 2008 in Vancouver, Spence joined with Trish Klein and Frazey Ford of The Be Good Tanyas, Simon Kendall of Doug and The Slugs, Rob Wilson, Mark Beatty, Khari McClelland and John Raham for a series of live gospel shows titled The Sweet Sounds Gospel Show.

In June 2008, Spence moved to Cork, Ireland to write songs for a new CD, Song for the Sea. She worked with Eoghan Regan, David Murphy, and NC Lawlor. However, she did not complete the project with them. In 2008 she also participated in live gospel show together with some other musicians such as Trish Klein and Frazey Ford of "The Be Good Tanyas" to be contributed to the Greater Vancouver Food Bank.

In the spring of 2009, Spence and Italian guitar player and lyricist, Francesco Forni, began playing live dates in Italy, Ireland and Northern Ireland. They were then invited to an interview and live performance on BBC Radio in May 2009 after they were seen performing at The Errigle Inn in Belfast.

Spence and Forni collaborated on the recording of Spence's second album, Song for the Sea in room 501 of the Ripa Hotel in Rome, Italy. The duo were seeking an organic and natural sound. In September 2011, they released the CD recordings at live shows in Rome, Italy and at Teatro Valle and Riunione Di Condiminio.

Two of Spence's songs were licensed for Showtime's 'The Chris Isaak Show'. Her songs were heard on CBC Radio in Canada, RTÉ Radio in Ireland, BBC Radio in the UK along with college and independent radio stations and net-stations.

She currently lives in Ireland where she makes live shows as well as in Canada.

== Discography ==
- A Town Called Hell (2007)
- Song for the Sea (2011)

== Reviewers' comments ==
Nowadays it is common for songs to be over produced, so it is comforting to hear the simplicity that can be found in Farrell's honest and exposed vocals and lyrics as well as guitar playing, yet still get a very confident delivery of an album.

— Fiona Clark, Maverick Magazine (England)

She has a haunting quality all her own which hints at longevity and suggests shows of this nature will become a thing of the past as her popularity grows. Discover her before she moves to the next level.

— Tim Peacock, Suite 101 (Ireland)

Farrell Spence delivers an album of sweet backwoods ballads charting the claustrophobic relationships and stunted dreams of isolated prairie town life: "Nothing ever happens in a town called hell". She's no Judith Chalmers that's for sure. It has a dusty wind blown lonesome flavour with clear and crisp playing of acoustic and steel guitar and occasional fiddle; sweet sounding but at the same time an indie album that steers clear of schmaltz and over production.

— Andrew Duwall, The Line of the Best Fit (England)

A Town Called Hell – A stunning debut album from Canadian-based singer-songwriter Farrell Spence, whose songs of life on the edge are both real and completely compelling. Real songs, real feelings / raw songs, raw feelings…this is an album for those of us who know the world around us is not and is never going to be perfect, but for as long as we have the Farrell Spences of this world giving us just that flicker of hope in their vocals that maybe, just maybe, there's a chance it might just get better, we should support and cherish the music they make that gets the rest of us through. A stunning debut and a collection of songs that deserved to be heard.

— Malcolm Carter, Penny Black Music Magazine (England)
