= Starless (box set) =

Box set by King Crimson
- Released: 2014
- Genres: Progressive rock, Heavy metal
- Labels: Discipline Global Mobile; Panegyric; Inner Knot
- Producer: King Crimson

King Crimson chronology
The Road to Red (2013)	Starless (2014)	THRAK (2015)

Starless is the fourth major box set release from English progressive rock group King Crimson, released in 2014 by Discipline Global Mobile & Panegyric Records.

Over 23 CDs, 2 Blu-ray audio discs and 2 DVDAs, it is a limited edition box set featuring studio and live recordings – many previously unreleased – from King Crimson's celebrated mid-1970s live line-up.

It includes the 2011 stereo mix and 5.1 surround mix of Starless and Bible Black by Steven Wilson and Robert Fripp.

== Track listing ==
Disc 1 – Apollo Theatre, Glasgow, Scotland, 23 October 1973 (part 1)
No.	Title	Writer(s)	Length
1.	"Improv: Sharks' Lungs in Lemsip"	David Cross, Robert Fripp, John Wetton, Bill Bruford	3:33
2.	"Larks' Tongues in Aspic (Part I)"	Cross, Fripp, Wetton, Bruford, Jamie Muir	8:02
3.	"RF Announcement"	n/a	2:00
4.	"Easy Money"	Fripp, Wetton, Richard Palmer-James	6:41
5.	"Improv: We'll Let You Know"	Cross, Fripp, Wetton, Bruford	4:55
6.	"The Night Watch"	Fripp, Wetton, Palmer-James	5:16
7.	"Fracture"	Fripp	14:07
8.	"Lament"	Fripp, Wetton, Palmer-James	5:12

Disc 2 – Apollo Theatre, Glasgow, Scotland, 23 October 1973 (part 2)
No.	Title	Writer(s)	Length
1.	"Book of Saturday"	Fripp, Wetton, Palmer-James	3:27
2.	"Improv: Tight Scrummy"	Cross, Fripp, Wetton, Bruford	8:25
3.	"Exiles"	Cross, Fripp, Wetton, Palmer-James	6:43
4.	"Improv: Loose Scrummy"	Cross, Fripp, Wetton, Bruford	3:00
5.	"The Talking Drum"	Cross, Fripp, Wetton, Bruford, Muir	6:07
6.	"Larks' Tongues in Aspic (Part II)" (Length includes 6:09 encore break)	Fripp	12:42
7.	"Peace – A Theme"	Fripp	1:03
8.	"Cat Food"	Fripp, Peter Sinfield, Ian McDonald	4:55

Disc 3 – Volkshaus, Zürich, Switzerland, 15 November 1973 (part 1)
No.	Title	Writer(s)	Length
1.	"Walk On: No Pussyfooting"	Fripp, Brian Eno	0:19
2.	"Improv: Some Pussyfooting"	Cross, Fripp, Wetton, Bruford	2:26
3.	"Larks' Tongues in Aspic (Part I)"	Cross, Fripp, Wetton, Bruford, Muir	8:13
4.	"RF Announcement"	Fripp	2:39
5.	"Lament"	Fripp, Wetton, Palmer-James	4:07
6.	"Peace – A Theme"	Fripp	0:54
7.	"Cat Food"	Fripp, Sinfield, McDonald	4:14
8.	"The Night Watch"	Fripp, Wetton, Palmer-James	6:01
9.	"Fracture"	Fripp	11:16

Disc 4 – Volkshaus, Zürich, Switzerland, 15 November 1973 (part 2)
No.	Title	Writer(s)	Length
1.	"The Law of Maximum Distress: Part I" (Improv)	Cross, Fripp, Wetton, Bruford	6:55
2.	"Improv: The Mincer" (Original album mix with additional ambience from audience bootleg)	Cross, Fripp, Wetton, Bruford, Palmer-James	3:54
3.	"The Law of Maximum Distress: Part II" (Improv)	Cross, Fripp, Wetton, Bruford	2:39
4.	"Easy Money"	Fripp, Wetton, Palmer-James	7:47
5.	"Exiles"	Cross, Fripp, Wetton, Palmer-James	7:02
6.	"Improv: Some More Pussyfooting"	Cross, Fripp, Wetton, Bruford	5:53
7.	"The Talking Drum"	Cross, Fripp, Wetton, Bruford, Muir	6:00
8.	"Larks' Tongues in Aspic (Part II)" (Length includes 4:07 encore break)	Fripp	10:06
9.	"21st Century Schizoid Man"	Fripp, McDonald, Greg Lake, Michael Giles, Sinfield	8:48

Disc 5 – Concertgebouw, Amsterdam, Netherlands, 23 November 1973 (part 1)
No.	Title	Writer(s)	Length
1.	"Easy Money" (Also in Surround mix and LPCM stereo on Disc 22 and Disc 24)	Fripp, Wetton, Palmer-James	6:13
2.	"Lament"	Fripp, Wetton, Palmer-James	4:13
3.	"Book of Saturday"	Fripp, Wetton, Palmer-James	2:52
4.	"RF Announcement"		1:02
5.	"Fracture"	Fripp	11:31
6.	"The Night Watch"	Fripp, Wetton, Palmer-James	5:05
7.	"Improv: Starless and Bible Black" (Also in Surround mix and LPCM stereo on Disc 22 and Disc 24)	Cross, Fripp, Wetton, Bruford	9:15

Disc 6 – Concertgebouw, Amsterdam, Netherlands, 23 November 1973 (part 2)
No.	Title	Writer(s)	Length
1.	"Improv: Trio" (Original album mix, with the original multitracks missing)	Cross, Fripp, Wetton, Bruford	6:07
2.	"Exiles" (Also in Surround mix and LPCM stereo on Disc 22 and Disc 24)	Cross, Fripp, Wetton, Palmer-James	6:39
3.	"Improv: The Fright Watch" (Also in Surround mix and LPCM stereo on Disc 22 and Disc 24)	Cross, Fripp, Wetton, Palmer-James	6:04
4.	"The Talking Drum" (Also in Surround mix and LPCM stereo on Disc 22 and Disc 24)	Cross, Fripp, Wetton, Bruford, Muir	6:32
5.	"Larks' Tongues in Aspic (Part II)" (Also in Surround mix and LPCM stereo on Disc 22 and Disc 24)	Fripp	7:31
6.	"21st Century Schizoid Man" (Also in Surround mix and LPCM stereo on Disc 22 and Disc 24)	Fripp, McDonald, Lake, Giles, Sinfield	10:52

Disc 7 – Palazzo dello Sport, Udine, Italy, 19 March 1974 (balance of show from restored from bootleg on Disc 27)
No.	Title	Writer(s)	Length
1.	"Exiles"	Cross, Fripp, Wetton, Palmer-James	6:47
2.	"Fracture"	Fripp	11:27
3.	"Larks' Tongues in Aspic (Part II)"	Fripp	6:34

Disc 8 – Palazzo dello Sport, Brescia, Italy, 20 March 1974
No.	Title	Writer(s)	Length
1.	"Improv I"	Cross, Fripp, Wetton, Bruford	2:30
2.	"Larks' Tongues in Aspic (Part I)"	Cross, Fripp, Wetton, Bruford, Muir	8:39
3.	"Doctor Diamond"	Cross, Fripp, Wetton, Bruford, Palmer-James	5:36
4.	"Easy Money"	Fripp, Wetton, Palmer-James	7:09
5.	"Lament"	Fripp, Wetton, Palmer-James	4:00
6.	"The Night Watch"	Fripp, Wetton, Palmer-James	4:09
7.	"Improv II"	Cross, Fripp, Wetton, Bruford	8:55
8.	"Starless"	Cross, Fripp, Wetton, Bruford, Palmer-James	12:05
9.	"Exiles" (Incomplete recording)	Cross, Fripp, Wetton, Palmer-James	4:02

Disc 9 – ORTF T.V., Paris, France, 22 March 1974
No.	Title	Writer(s)	Length
1.	"Larks' Tongues in Aspic (Part II)" (Video of Disc 9 available on Disc 24)	Fripp	6:13
2.	"Improv"	Cross, Fripp, Wetton, Bruford	2:45
3.	"The Night Watch"	Fripp, Wetton, Palmer-James	4:25
4.	"Lament"	Fripp, Wetton, Palmer-James	4:07
5.	"Starless"	Cross, Fripp, Wetton, Bruford, Palmer-James	11:31

Disc 10 – Palais Paul Videl, Avignon, France, 24 March 1974
No.	Title	Writer(s)	Length
1.	"Walk On: No Pussyfooting"	Fripp, Eno	0:16
2.	"Doctor Diamond"	Cross, Fripp, Wetton, Bruford, Palmer-James	5:23
3.	"Lament"	Fripp, Wetton, Palmer-James	4:13
4.	"Fracture"	Fripp	11:17
5.	"The Night Watch"	Fripp, Wetton, Palmer-James	4:49
6.	"The Great Deceiver"	Wetton, Fripp, Palmer-James	3:56
7.	"Starless"	Cross, Fripp, Wetton, Bruford, Palmer-James	12:03
8.	"Exiles"	Cross, Fripp, Wetton, Palmer-James	6:56
9.	"The Talking Drum"	Cross, Frupp, Wetton, Bruford, Muir	6:21
10.	"Larks' Tongues in Aspic (Part II)" (Incomplete recording)	Fripp	3:44

Disc 11 – Palais des Sports, Besançon, France, 25 March 1974
No.	Title	Writer(s)	Length
1.	"Doctor Diamond" (Incomplete recording)	Cross, Fripp, Wetton, Bruford, Palmer-James	2:02
2.	"Lament"	Fripp, Wetton, Palmer-James	4:15
3.	"Fracture"	Fripp	11:10
4.	"The Night Watch"	Fripp, Wetton, Palmer-James	4:47
5.	"The Great Deceiver"	Wetton, Fripp, Palmer-James	3:58
6.	"Improv I"	Cross, Fripp, Wetton, Bruford	8:02
7.	"Starless"	Cross, Fripp, Wetton, Bruford, Palmer-James	11:56
8.	"Exiles"	Cross, Fripp, Wetton, Palmer-James	6:45
9.	"Improv II"	Cross, Fripp Wetton, Bruford	3:33

Disc 12 – Stadttheater, Augsburg, Germany, 27 March 1974
No.	Title	Writer(s)	Length
1.	"Walk On: No Pussyfooting"	Fripp, Eno	0:29
2.	"Doctor Diamond"	Cross, Fripp, Wetton, Bruford, Palmer-James	5:23
3.	"Lament"	Fripp, Wetton, Palmer-James	4:11
4.	"Easy Money"	Fripp, Wetton, Palmer-James	7:12
5.	"Fracture"	Fripp	11:04
6.	"The Night Watch"	Fripp, Wetton, Palmer-James	4:29
7.	"The Great Deceiver"	Wetton, Fripp, Palmer-James	3:48
8.	"Starless"	Cross, Fripp, Wetton, Bruford, Palmer-James	11:16
9.	"Improv: Augsburg"	Cross, Fripp, Wetton, Bruford	1:41
10.	"Exiles"	Cross, Fripp, Wetton, Palmer-James	6:36
11.	"Larks' Tongues in Aspic (Part II)" (Incomplete recording)	Fripp	2:52

Disc 13 – Halle der Fachhochschule, Dieburg, Germany, 28 March 1974
No.	Title	Writer(s)	Length
1.	"Doctor Diamond"	Cross, Fripp, Wetton, Bruford, Palmer-James	5:37
2.	"RF Announcement"	Fripp	0:48
3.	"Lament"	Fripp, Wetton, Palmer-James	4:18
4.	"The Night Watch"	Fripp, Wetton, Palmer-James	4:46
5.	"Fracture"	Fripp	11:28
6.	"Improv I"	Cross, Fripp, Wetton, Bruford	9:29
7.	"Exiles"	Cross, Fripp, Wetton, Palmer-James	6:51
8.	"The Great Deceiver"	Wetton, Fripp, Palmer-James	3:54
9.	"Improv II"	Cross, Fripp, Wetton, Bruford	6:41
10.	"Starless" (Incomplete recording)	Cross, Fripp, Wetton, Bruford, Palmer-James	4:36

Disc 14 – Stadthalle, Heidelberg, Germany, 29 March 1974
No.	Title	Writer(s)	Length
1.	"Walk On: No Pussyfooting"	Fripp, Eno	0:26
2.	"Improv I"	Cross, Fripp, Wetton, Bruford	2:42
3.	"Doctor Diamond"	Cross, Fripp, Wetton, Bruford, Palmer-James	5:36
4.	"RF Announcement"		1:38
5.	"Improv II"	Cross, Fripp, Wetton, Bruford	3:12
6.	"Exiles"	Cross, Fripp, Wetton, Palmer-James	6:53
7.	"Improv III"	Cross, Fripp, Wetton, Bruford	7:32
8.	"Starless"	Cross, Fripp, Wetton, Bruford, Palmer-James	12:03
9.	"The Night Watch"	Fripp, Wetton, Palmer-James	4:39
10.	"Lament"	Fripp, Wetton, Palmer-James	4:19
11.	"Easy Money"	Fripp, Wetton, Palmer-James	6:31
12.	"Fracture" (Incomplete recording)	Fripp	3:07

Disc 15 – Elzer Hof, Mainz, Germany, 30 March 1974 (end of concert from restored bootleg source on Disc 26)
No.	Title	Writer(s)	Length
1.	"Walk On: No Pussyfooting"	Fripp, Eno	1:16
2.	"Improv: The Savage"	Cross, Fripp, Wetton, Bruford	2:49
3.	"Doctor Diamond"	Cross, Fripp, Wetton, Bruford, Palmer-James	6:13
4.	"Improv: Arabica"	Cross, Fripp, Wetton, Bruford	3:38
5.	"Exiles"	Cross, Fripp, Wetton, Palmer-James	7:17
6.	"Improv: Atria"	Cross, Fripp, Wetton, Palmer-James	6:22
7.	"The Night Watch"	Fripp, Wetton, Palmer-James	5:04
8.	"Starless"	Cross, Fripp, Wetton, Bruford, Palmer-James	12:26
9.	"Lament"	Fripp, Wetton, Palmer-James	4:22
10.	"Improv: Trio"	Cross, Fripp, Wetton, Bruford	5:07
11.	"Easy Money"	Fripp, Wetton, Palmer-James	7:46

Disc 16 – Jahnhalle, Pforzheim, Germany, 31 March 1974
No.	Title	Writer(s)	Length
1.	"The Great Deceiver"	Wetton, Fripp, Palmer-James	3:56
2.	"Improv I"	Cross, Fripp, Wetton, Bruford	3:24
3.	"Doctor Diamond"	Cross, Fripp, Wetton, Bruford, Palmer-James	5:21
4.	"Improv II"	Cross, Fripp, Wetton, Bruford	7:04
5.	"Exiles"	Cross, Fripp, Wetton, Palmer-James	7:11
6.	"The Night Watch"	Fripp, Wetton, Palmer-James	4:55
7.	"Lament"	Fripp, Wetton, Palmer-James	4:16
8.	"Starless"	Cross, Fripp, Wetton, Bruford, Palmer-James	12:14
9.	"Easy Money"	Fripp, Wetton, Palmer-James	6:37
10.	"Fracture" (Incomplete recording)	Fripp	3:08

Disc 17 – Stadthalle, Kassel, Germany, 1 April 1974
No.	Title	Writer(s)	Length
1.	"The Great Deceiver" (Incomplete recording)	Wetton, Fripp, Palmer-James	3:53
2.	"Improv I"	Cross, Fripp, Wetton, Bruford	2:05
3.	"Doctor Diamond"	Cross, Fripp, Wetton, Bruford, Palmer-James	5:08
4.	"Improv II"	Cross, Fripp, Wetton, Bruford	5:02
5.	"Exiles"	Cross, Fripp, Wetton, Palmer-James	7:03
6.	"The Night Watch"	Fripp, Wetton, Palmer-James	4:55
7.	"Lament"	Fripp, Wetton, Palmer-James	4:18
8.	"Starless"	Cross, Fripp, Wetton, Bruford, Palmer-James	12:13
9.	"Improv III"	Cross, Fripp, Wetton, Bruford	2:05
10.	"Easy Money"	Fripp, Wetton, Palmer-James	6:57
11.	"Fracture" (Incomplete recording)	Fripp	4:06

Disc 18 – Stadthalle, Göttingen, Germany, 2 April 1974
No.	Title	Writer(s)	Length
1.	"The Great Deceiver" (Incomplete recording)	Wetton, Fripp, Palmer-James	3:51
2.	"Doctor Diamond"	Cross, Fripp, Wetton, Bruford, Palmer-James	5:27
3.	"Exiles"	Cross, Fripp, Wetton, Bruford, Palmer-James	7:12
4.	"Fracture"	Fripp	11:02
5.	"RF Announcement"		1:37
6.	"Lament"	Fripp, Wetton, Palmer-James	4:11
7.	"Starless"	Cross, Fripp, Wetton, Bruford, Palmer-James	11:50
8.	"Improv I"	Cross, Fripp, Wetton, Bruford	8:45
9.	"The Night Watch"	Fripp, Wetton, Bruford	4:22

Disc 19 – Concertgebouw, Amsterdam, Netherlands, 23 November 1973 (preparatory mix for radio broadcast by George Chkiantz in 1974)
No.	Title	Writer(s)	Length
1.	"Easy Money"	Fripp, Wetton, Palmer-James	6:19
2.	"Lament"	Fripp, Wetton, Palmer-James	4:15
3.	"Book of Saturday"	Fripp, Wetton, Palmer-James	2:49
4.	"Exiles"	Cross, Fripp, Wetton, Palmer-James	6:07
5.	"Improv: The Fright Watch"	Cross, Fripp, Wetton, Bruford	6:16
6.	"The Talking Drum"	Cross, Fripp, Wetton, Bruford, Muir	6:34
7.	"Larks' Tongues in Aspic (Part II)"	Fripp	7:53
8.	"21st Century Schizoid Man"	Fripp, McDonald, Lake, Giles, Sinfield	9:46

Disc 20 – Starless and Bible Black, 2011 Stereo Mix
No.	Title	Length
1.	"The Great Deceiver"
2.	"Lament"
3.	"We'll Let You Know"
4.	"The Night Watch"
5.	"Trio"
6.	"The Mincer"
7.	"Starless and Bible Black"
8.	"Fracture"

Disc 21 – DVD-A One
No.	Title	Length
1.	"The Great Deceiver" (Starless and Bible Black 5.1 Surround Mix)
2.	"Lament" (Starless and Bible Black 5.1 Surround Mix)
3.	"We'll Let You Know" (Starless and Bible Black 5.1 Surround Mix)
4.	"The Night Watch" (Starless and Bible Black 5.1 Surround Mix)
5.	"Trio" (Starless and Bible Black 5.1 Surround Mix - upmixed from to 5.1 from original stereo masters)
6.	"The Mincer" (Starless and Bible Black 5.1 Surround Mix - upmixed from to 5.1 from original stereo masters)
7.	"Starless And Bible Black" (Starless and Bible Black 5.1 Surround Mix)
8.	"Fracture" (Starless and Bible Black 5.1 Surround Mix)
9.	"The Great Deceiver" (Starless and Bible Black 2011 Stereo Mix)
10.	"Lament" (Starless and Bible Black 2011 Stereo Mix)
11.	"We'll Let You Know" (Starless and Bible Black 2011 Stereo Mix)
12.	"The Night Watch" (Starless and Bible Black 2011 Stereo Mix)
13.	"Trio" (Starless and Bible Black 2011 Stereo Mix - taken from 30th anniversary edition as multitracks are missing)
14.	"The Mincer" (Starless and Bible Black 2011 Stereo Mix - taken from 30th anniversary edition as multitracks are missing)
15.	"Starless And Bible Black" (Starless and Bible Black 2011 Stereo Mix)
16.	"Fracture" (Starless and Bible Black 2011 Stereo Mix)
17.	"The Great Deceiver" (Starless and Bible Black Original Stereo Mix 30th Anniversary Master)
18.	"Lament" (Starless and Bible Black Original Stereo Mix 30th Anniversary Master)
19.	"We'll Let You Know" (Starless and Bible Black Original Stereo Mix 30th Anniversary Master)
20.	"The Night Watch" (Starless and Bible Black Original Stereo Mix 30th Anniversary Master)
21.	"Trio" (Starless and Bible Black Original Stereo Mix 30th Anniversary Master)
22.	"The Mincer" (Starless and Bible Black Original Stereo Mix 30th Anniversary Master)
23.	"Starless And Bible Black" (Starless and Bible Black Original Stereo Mix 30th Anniversary Master)
24.	"Fracture" (Starless and Bible Black Original Stereo Mix 30th Anniversary Master)
25.	"Lament" (Volkshaus, Zürich, Switzerland, 15 November 1973 - LPCM Stereo (24/48))
26.	"The Night Watch" (Volkshaus, Zürich, Switzerland, 15 November 1973 - LPCM Stereo (24/48))
27.	"Fracture" (Volkshaus, Zürich, Switzerland, 15 November 1973 - LPCM Stereo (24/48))
28.	"The Law Of Maximum Distress: Part I" (Volkshaus, Zürich, Switzerland, 15 November 1973 - LPCM Stereo (24/48))
29.	"Improv: The Mincer" (Volkshaus, Zürich, Switzerland, 15 November 1973 - LPCM Stereo (24/48))
30.	"The Law Of Maximum Distress: Part II" (Volkshaus, Zürich, Switzerland, 15 November 1973 - LPCM Stereo (24/48))
31.	"We’ll Let You Know" (Additional Tracks - LPCM Stereo (24/48) - Unedited From The Great Deceiver)
32.	"Doctor Diamond" (Additional Tracks - LPCM Stereo (24/48) - Live, 23 June 1973, Richards Club, Atlanta, Georgia)
33.	"Guts On My Side" (Additional Tracks - LPCM Stereo (24/48) - Live, 19 March 1974, Palazzo Dello Sport, Udine, Italy)
34.	"The Night Watch" (Additional Tracks - LPCM Stereo (24/48) - Single Edit - Stereo)
35.	"The Night Watch" (Additional Tracks - LPCM Stereo (24/48) - US Radio Single Edit - Mono)
36.	"30 Second Radio Advert" (Additional Tracks - LPCM Stereo (24/48))
37.	"60 Second Radio Advert" (Additional Tracks - LPCM Stereo (24/48))
38.	"Easy Money" (Video Content - Central Park, New York, 25 June 1973)
39.	"Fragged Dusty Wall Carpet" (Video Content - Central Park, New York, 25 June 1973)

Disc 22 – DVD-A Two
No.	Title	Length
1.	"Walk On: No Pussyfooting" (Elzer Hof, Mainz, Germany, 30 March 1974 - Multi-channel audio mix, LPCM stereo mix (24/48))
2.	"Improv: The Savage" (Elzer Hof, Mainz, Germany, 30 March 1974 - Multi-channel audio mix, LPCM stereo mix (24/48))
3.	"Doctor Diamond" (Elzer Hof, Mainz, Germany, 30 March 1974 - Multi-channel audio mix, LPCM stereo mix (24/48))
4.	"Improv: Arabica" (Elzer Hof, Mainz, Germany, 30 March 1974 - Multi-channel audio mix, LPCM stereo mix (24/48))
5.	"Exiles" (Elzer Hof, Mainz, Germany, 30 March 1974 - Multi-channel audio mix, LPCM stereo mix (24/48))
6.	"Improv: Atria" (Elzer Hof, Mainz, Germany, 30 March 1974 - Multi-channel audio mix, LPCM stereo mix (24/48))
7.	"The Night Watch" (Elzer Hof, Mainz, Germany, 30 March 1974 - Multi-channel audio mix, LPCM stereo mix (24/48))
8.	"Starless" (Elzer Hof, Mainz, Germany, 30 March 1974 - Multi-channel audio mix, LPCM stereo mix (24/48))
9.	"Lament" (Elzer Hof, Mainz, Germany, 30 March 1974 - Multi-channel audio mix, LPCM stereo mix (24/48))
10.	"Improv: Trio" (Elzer Hof, Mainz, Germany, 30 March 1974 - Multi-channel audio mix, LPCM stereo mix (24/48))
11.	"Easy Money" (Elzer Hof, Mainz, Germany, 30 March 1974 - Multi-channel audio mix, LPCM stereo mix (24/48))
12.	"Fracture" (Elzer Hof, Mainz, Germany, 30 March 1974 - Multi-channel audio mix, LPCM stereo mix (24/48) - Fragment)
13.	"Easy Money" (Concertgebouw, Amsterdam, Netherlands, 23 November 1973 - Multi-channel audio mix, LPCM stereo mix (24/48))
14.	"Improv: Starless And Bible Black" (Concertgebouw, Amsterdam, Netherlands, 23 November 1973 - Multi-channel audio mix, LPCM stereo mix (24/48))
15.	"Exiles" (Concertgebouw, Amsterdam, Netherlands, 23 November 1973 - Multi-channel audio mix, LPCM stereo mix (24/48))
16.	"Improv: The Fright Watch" (Concertgebouw, Amsterdam, Netherlands, 23 November 1973 - Multi-channel audio mix, LPCM stereo mix (24/48))
17.	"The Talking Drum" (Concertgebouw, Amsterdam, Netherlands, 23 November 1973 - Multi-channel audio mix, LPCM stereo mix (24/48))
18.	"Larks’ Tongues In Aspic (Part II)" (Concertgebouw, Amsterdam, Netherlands, 23 November 1973 - Multi-channel audio mix, LPCM stereo mix (24/48))
19.	"21st Century Schizoid Man" (Concertgebouw, Amsterdam, Netherlands, 23 November 1973 - Multi-channel audio mix, LPCM stereo mix (24/48))
20.	"The Great Deceiver" (Stanley Theatre, Pittsburgh, USA, 29 April 1974 - Quad mix by George Chkiantz 1974)
21.	"Lament" (Stanley Theatre, Pittsburgh, USA, 29 April 1974 - Quad mix by George Chkiantz 1974)
22.	"The Night Watch" (Stanley Theatre, Pittsburgh, USA, 29 April 1974 - Quad mix by George Chkiantz 1974)
23.	"Starless" (Stanley Theatre, Pittsburgh, USA, 29 April 1974 - Quad mix by George Chkiantz 1974)

Disc 23 – Blu-ray Disc One Audio Content
No.	Title	Length
1.	"Walk On" (Apollo Theatre, Glasgow, UK, 23 October 1973 - LPCM Stereo (24/192) / DTS-HD Master Audio)
2.	"Improv: Sharks’ Lungs In Lemsip" (Apollo Theatre, Glasgow, UK, 23 October 1973 - LPCM Stereo (24/192) / DTS-HD Master Audio)
3.	"Larks’ Tongues In Aspic (Part I)" (Apollo Theatre, Glasgow, UK, 23 October 1973 - LPCM Stereo (24/192) / DTS-HD Master Audio)
4.	"Book Of Saturday" (Apollo Theatre, Glasgow, UK, 23 October 1973 - LPCM Stereo (24/192) / DTS-HD Master Audio)
5.	"Easy Money" (Apollo Theatre, Glasgow, UK, 23 October 1973 - LPCM Stereo (24/192) / DTS-HD Master Audio)
6.	"Improv: We'll Let You Know" (Apollo Theatre, Glasgow, UK, 23 October 1973 - LPCM Stereo (24/192) / DTS-HD Master Audio)
7.	"The Night Watch" (Apollo Theatre, Glasgow, UK, 23 October 1973 - LPCM Stereo (24/192) / DTS-HD Master Audio)
8.	"Improv: Tight Scrummy" (Apollo Theatre, Glasgow, UK, 23 October 1973 - LPCM Stereo (24/192) / DTS-HD Master Audio)
9.	"Improv: Loose Scrummy" (Apollo Theatre, Glasgow, UK, 23 October 1973 - LPCM Stereo (24/192) / DTS-HD Master Audio)
10.	"The Talking Drum" (Apollo Theatre, Glasgow, UK, 23 October 1973 - LPCM Stereo (24/192) / DTS-HD Master Audio)
11.	"Larks’ Tongues In Aspic (Part II)" (Apollo Theatre, Glasgow, UK, 23 October 1973 - LPCM Stereo (24/192) / DTS-HD Master Audio)
12.	"Peace - A Theme" (Apollo Theatre, Glasgow, UK, 23 October 1973 - LPCM Stereo (24/192) / DTS-HD Master Audio)
13.	"Cat Food" (Apollo Theatre, Glasgow, UK, 23 October 1973 - LPCM Stereo (24/192) / DTS-HD Master Audio)
14.	"Walk On: No Pussyfooting" (Volkshaus, Zurich, Switzerland, 15 November 1973 - LPCM Stereo (24/192) / DTS-HD Master Audio)
15.	"Improv: Some Pussyfooting" (Volkshaus, Zurich, Switzerland, 15 November 1973 - LPCM Stereo (24/192) / DTS-HD Master Audio)
16.	"Larks' Tongues In Aspic: Part I" (Volkshaus, Zurich, Switzerland, 15 November 1973 - LPCM Stereo (24/192) / DTS-HD Master Audio)
17.	"RF Announcement" (Volkshaus, Zurich, Switzerland, 15 November 1973 - LPCM Stereo (24/192) / DTS-HD Master Audio)
18.	"Lament" (Volkshaus, Zurich, Switzerland, 15 November 1973 - LPCM Stereo (24/192) / DTS-HD Master Audio)
19.	"Peace - A Theme" (Volkshaus, Zurich, Switzerland, 15 November 1973 - LPCM Stereo (24/192) / DTS-HD Master Audio)
20.	"Cat Food" (Volkshaus, Zurich, Switzerland, 15 November 1973 - LPCM Stereo (24/192) / DTS-HD Master Audio)
21.	"Fracture" (Volkshaus, Zurich, Switzerland, 15 November 1973 - LPCM Stereo (24/192) / DTS-HD Master Audio)
22.	"The Law Of Maximum Distress: Part I" (Volkshaus, Zurich, Switzerland, 15 November 1973 - LPCM Stereo (24/192) / DTS-HD Master Audio)
23.	"Improv: The Mincer" (Volkshaus, Zurich, Switzerland, 15 November 1973 - LPCM Stereo (24/192) / DTS-HD Master Audio)
24.	"The Law Of Maximum Distress: Part II" (Volkshaus, Zurich, Switzerland, 15 November 1973 - LPCM Stereo (24/192) / DTS-HD Master Audio)
25.	"Easy Money" (Volkshaus, Zurich, Switzerland, 15 November 1973 - LPCM Stereo (24/192) / DTS-HD Master Audio)
26.	"Exiles" (Volkshaus, Zurich, Switzerland, 15 November 1973 - LPCM Stereo (24/192) / DTS-HD Master Audio)
27.	"Improv: Some More Pussyfooting" (Volkshaus, Zurich, Switzerland, 15 November 1973 - LPCM Stereo (24/192) / DTS-HD Master Audio)
28.	"The Talking Drum" (Volkshaus, Zurich, Switzerland, 15 November 1973 - LPCM Stereo (24/192) / DTS-HD Master Audio)
29.	"Larks’ Tongues In Aspic (Part II)" (Volkshaus, Zurich, Switzerland, 15 November 1973 - LPCM Stereo (24/192) / DTS-HD Master Audio)
30.	"21st Century Schizoid Man" (Volkshaus, Zurich, Switzerland, 15 November 1973 - LPCM Stereo (24/192) / DTS-HD Master Audio)
31.	"Easy Money" (Concertgebouw, Amsterdam, Netherlands, 23 November 1973. 2014 Stereo Mix by Steven Wilson - LPCM Stereo (24/96) / DTS-HD Master Audio)
32.	"Lament" (Concertgebouw, Amsterdam, Netherlands, 23 November 1973. 2014 Stereo Mix by Steven Wilson - LPCM Stereo (24/96) / DTS-HD Master Audio)
33.	"Book Of Saturday" (Concertgebouw, Amsterdam, Netherlands, 23 November 1973. 2014 Stereo Mix by Steven Wilson - LPCM Stereo (24/96) / DTS-HD Master Audio)
34.	"RF Announcement" (Concertgebouw, Amsterdam, Netherlands, 23 November 1973. 2014 Stereo Mix by Steven Wilson - LPCM Stereo (24/96) / DTS-HD Master Audio)
35.	"Fracture" (Concertgebouw, Amsterdam, Netherlands, 23 November 1973. 2014 Stereo Mix by Steven Wilson - LPCM Stereo (24/96) / DTS-HD Master Audio)
36.	"The Night Watch" (Concertgebouw, Amsterdam, Netherlands, 23 November 1973. 2014 Stereo Mix by Steven Wilson - LPCM Stereo (24/96) / DTS-HD Master Audio)
37.	"Improv: Starless And Bible Black" (Concertgebouw, Amsterdam, Netherlands, 23 November 1973. 2014 Stereo Mix by Steven Wilson - LPCM Stereo (24/96) / DTS-HD Master Audio)
38.	"The Great Deceiver" (Concertgebouw, Amsterdam, Netherlands, 23 November 1973. 2014 Stereo Mix by Steven Wilson - LPCM Stereo (24/96) / DTS-HD Master Audio)
39.	"Exiles" (Concertgebouw, Amsterdam, Netherlands, 23 November 1973. 2014 Stereo Mix by Steven Wilson - LPCM Stereo (24/96) / DTS-HD Master Audio)
40.	"Improv: The Fright Watch" (Concertgebouw, Amsterdam, Netherlands, 23 November 1973. 2014 Stereo Mix by Steven Wilson - LPCM Stereo (24/96) / DTS-HD Master Audio)
41.	"The Talking Drum" (Concertgebouw, Amsterdam, Netherlands, 23 November 1973. 2014 Stereo Mix by Steven Wilson - LPCM Stereo (24/96) / DTS-HD Master Audio)
42.	"Larks’ Tongues In Aspic (Part II)" (Concertgebouw, Amsterdam, Netherlands, 23 November 1973. 2014 Stereo Mix by Steven Wilson - LPCM Stereo (24/96) / DTS-HD Master Audio)
43.	"21st Century Schizoid Man" (Concertgebouw, Amsterdam, Netherlands, 23 November 1973. 2014 Stereo Mix by Steven Wilson - LPCM Stereo (24/96) / DTS-HD Master Audio)
44.	"Easy Money" (Additional Material: Concertgebouw, Amsterdam, Netherlands 1973 Stereo Mix by George Chkiantz)
45.	"Lament" (Additional Material: Concertgebouw, Amsterdam, Netherlands 1973 Stereo Mix by George Chkiantz)
46.	"Book Of Saturday" (Additional Material: Concertgebouw, Amsterdam, Netherlands 1973 Stereo Mix by George Chkiantz)
47.	"Exiles" (Additional Material: Concertgebouw, Amsterdam, Netherlands 1973 Stereo Mix by George Chkiantz)
48.	"Improv: The Fright Watch" (Additional Material: Concertgebouw, Amsterdam, Netherlands 1973 Stereo Mix by George Chkiantz)
49.	"The Talking Drum" (Additional Material: Concertgebouw, Amsterdam, Netherlands 1973 Stereo Mix by George Chkiantz)
50.	"Larks’ Tongues In Aspic (Part II)" (Additional Material: Concertgebouw, Amsterdam, Netherlands 1973 Stereo Mix by George Chkiantz)
51.	"21st Century Schizoid Man" (Additional Material: Concertgebouw, Amsterdam, Netherlands 1973 Stereo Mix by George Chkiantz)

Disc 24 – Blu-ray Disc Two Audio Content
No.	Title	Length
1.	"The Great Deceiver" (Starless And Bible Black - 5.1 Surround Mix - DTS-HD Master Surround and LPCM 5.1 Surround)
2.	"Lament" (Starless And Bible Black - 5.1 Surround Mix - DTS-HD Master Surround and LPCM 5.1 Surround)
3.	"We’ll Let You Know" (Starless And Bible Black - 5.1 Surround Mix - DTS-HD Master Surround and LPCM 5.1 Surround)
4.	"The Night Watch" (Starless And Bible Black - 5.1 Surround Mix - DTS-HD Master Surround and LPCM 5.1 Surround)
5.	"Trio" (Starless And Bible Black - 5.1 Surround Mix - DTS-HD Master Surround and LPCM 5.1 Surround)
6.	"The Mincer" (Starless And Bible Black - 5.1 Surround Mix - DTS-HD Master Surround and LPCM 5.1 Surround)
7.	"Starless And Bible Black" (Starless And Bible Black - 5.1 Surround Mix - DTS-HD Master Surround and LPCM 5.1 Surround)
8.	"Fracture" (Starless And Bible Black - 5.1 Surround Mix - DTS-HD Master Surround and LPCM 5.1 Surround)
9.	"The Great Deceiver" (Starless And Bible Black - 2011 Stereo Mix - LPCM Stereo (24/96))
10.	"Lament" (Starless And Bible Black - 2011 Stereo Mix - LPCM Stereo (24/96))
11.	"We’ll Let You Know" (Starless And Bible Black - 2011 Stereo Mix - LPCM Stereo (24/96))
12.	"The Night Watch" (Starless And Bible Black - 2011 Stereo Mix - LPCM Stereo (24/96))
13.	"Trio" (Starless And Bible Black - 2011 Stereo Mix - LPCM Stereo (24/96))
14.	"The Mincer" (Starless And Bible Black - 2011 Stereo Mix - LPCM Stereo (24/96))
15.	"Starless And Bible Black" (Starless And Bible Black - 2011 Stereo Mix - LPCM Stereo (24/96))
16.	"Fracture" (Starless And Bible Black - 2011 Stereo Mix - LPCM Stereo (24/96))
17.	"The Great Deceiver" (Starless And Bible Black - Original Stereo Mix 30th Anniversary Master)
18.	"Lament" (Starless And Bible Black - Original Stereo Mix 30th Anniversary Master)
19.	"We’ll Let You Know" (Starless And Bible Black - Original Stereo Mix 30th Anniversary Master)
20.	"The Night Watch" (Starless And Bible Black - Original Stereo Mix 30th Anniversary Master)
21.	"Trio" (Starless And Bible Black - Original Stereo Mix 30th Anniversary Master)
22.	"The Mincer" (Starless And Bible Black - Original Stereo Mix 30th Anniversary Master)
23.	"Starless And Bible Black" (Starless And Bible Black - Original Stereo Mix 30th Anniversary Master)
24.	"Fracture" (Starless And Bible Black - Original Stereo Mix 30th Anniversary Master)
25.	"The Great Deceiver" (Starless And Bible Black - Original UK Vinyl Transfer)
26.	"Lament" (Starless And Bible Black - Original UK Vinyl Transfer)
27.	"We’ll Let You Know" (Starless And Bible Black - Original UK Vinyl Transfer)
28.	"The Night Watch" (Starless And Bible Black - Original UK Vinyl Transfer)
29.	"Trio" (Starless And Bible Black - Original UK Vinyl Transfer)
30.	"The Mincer" (Starless And Bible Black - Original UK Vinyl Transfer)
31.	"Starless And Bible Black" (Starless And Bible Black - Original UK Vinyl Transfer)
32.	"Fracture" (Starless And Bible Black - Original UK Vinyl Transfer)
33.	"The Night Watch" (Additional Tracks - LPCM Stereo (24/48) - Single Edit - Stereo)
34.	"The Night Watch" (Additional Tracks - LPCM Stereo (24/48) - US Radio Single Edit - Mono)
35.	"30 Second Radio Advert" (Additional Tracks - LPCM Stereo (24/48))
36.	"60 Second Radio Advert" (Additional Tracks - LPCM Stereo (24/48))
37.	"Walk On: No Pussyfooting" (Elzer Hof, Mainz, Germany, 30 March 1974 - DTS-HD Master Surround, LPCM Surround, LPCM Stereo (24/96))
38.	"Improv: The Savage" (Elzer Hof, Mainz, Germany, 30 March 1974 - DTS-HD Master Surround, LPCM Surround, LPCM Stereo (24/96))
39.	"Doctor Diamond" (Elzer Hof, Mainz, Germany, 30 March 1974 - DTS-HD Master Surround, LPCM Surround, LPCM Stereo (24/96))
40.	"Improv: Arabica" (Elzer Hof, Mainz, Germany, 30 March 1974 - DTS-HD Master Surround, LPCM Surround, LPCM Stereo (24/96))
41.	"Exiles" (Elzer Hof, Mainz, Germany, 30 March 1974 - DTS-HD Master Surround, LPCM Surround, LPCM Stereo (24/96))
42.	"Improv: Atria" (Elzer Hof, Mainz, Germany, 30 March 1974 - DTS-HD Master Surround, LPCM Surround, LPCM Stereo (24/96))
43.	"The Night Watch" (Elzer Hof, Mainz, Germany, 30 March 1974 - DTS-HD Master Surround, LPCM Surround, LPCM Stereo (24/96))
44.	"Starless" (Elzer Hof, Mainz, Germany, 30 March 1974 - DTS-HD Master Surround, LPCM Surround, LPCM Stereo (24/96))
45.	"Lament" (Elzer Hof, Mainz, Germany, 30 March 1974 - DTS-HD Master Surround, LPCM Surround, LPCM Stereo (24/96))
46.	"Improv: Trio" (Elzer Hof, Mainz, Germany, 30 March 1974 - DTS-HD Master Surround, LPCM Surround, LPCM Stereo (24/96))
47.	"Easy Money" (Elzer Hof, Mainz, Germany, 30 March 1974 - DTS-HD Master Surround, LPCM Surround, LPCM Stereo (24/96))
48.	"Fracture" (Elzer Hof, Mainz, Germany, 30 March 1974 - DTS-HD Master Surround, LPCM Surround, LPCM Stereo (24/96) - Fragment)
49.	"Easy Money" (Concertgebouw, Amsterdam, Netherlands, 23 November 1973 - DTS-HD Master Surround, LPCM Surround, LPCM Stereo (24/96))
50.	"Improv: Starless And Bible Black" (Concertgebouw, Amsterdam, Netherlands, 23 November 1973 - DTS-HD Master Surround, LPCM Surround, LPCM Stereo (24/96))
51.	"Exiles" (Concertgebouw, Amsterdam, Netherlands, 23 November 1973 - DTS-HD Master Surround, LPCM Surround, LPCM Stereo (24/96))
52.	"Improv: The Fright Watch" (Concertgebouw, Amsterdam, Netherlands, 23 November 1973 - DTS-HD Master Surround, LPCM Surround, LPCM Stereo (24/96))
53.	"The Talking Drum" (Concertgebouw, Amsterdam, Netherlands, 23 November 1973 - DTS-HD Master Surround, LPCM Surround, LPCM Stereo (24/96))
54.	"Larks’ Tongues In Aspic (Part II)" (Concertgebouw, Amsterdam, Netherlands, 23 November 1973 - DTS-HD Master Surround, LPCM Surround, LPCM Stereo (24/96))
55.	"21st Century Schizoid Man" (Concertgebouw, Amsterdam, Netherlands, 23 November 1973 - DTS-HD Master Surround, LPCM Surround, LPCM Stereo (24/96))
56.	"The Great Deceiver" (Stanley Theatre, Pittsburgh, USA, 29 April 1974 - Quad mix by George Chkiantz 1974)
57.	"Lament" (Stanley Theatre, Pittsburgh, USA, 29 April 1974 - Quad mix by George Chkiantz 1974)
58.	"The Night Watch" (Stanley Theatre, Pittsburgh, USA, 29 April 1974 - Quad mix by George Chkiantz 1974)
59.	"Starless" (Stanley Theatre, Pittsburgh, USA, 29 April 1974 - Quad mix by George Chkiantz 1974)
60.	"Larks’ Tongues In Aspic (Part II)" (Video Content - ORTF T.V, Paris, France, 22 March 1974)
61.	"Improv" (Video Content - ORTF T.V, Paris, France, 22 March 1974)
62.	"The Night Watch" (Video Content - ORTF T.V, Paris, France, 22 March 1974)
63.	"Lament" (Video Content - ORTF T.V, Paris, France, 22 March 1974)
64.	"Starless" (Video Content - ORTF T.V, Paris, France, 22 March 1974)
65.	"Easy Money" (Video Content - Central Park, New York, 25 June 1973)
66.	"Fragged Dusty Wall Carpet" (Video Content - Central Park, New York, 25 June 1973)

Disc 25 – Bonus Audio 1 – University of Texas, Arlington, Texas, 6 October 1973
No.	Title	Writer(s)	Length
1.	"Walk On"	Fripp, Eno	2:05
2.	"Improv I"	Cross, Fripp, Wetton, Bruford	3:15
3.	"Larks' Tongues in Aspic (Part I)"	Cross, Fripp, Wetton, Bruford, Muir	8:29
4.	"RF Announcement"		3:01
5.	"Easy Money"	Fripp, Wetton, Palmer-James	7:41
6.	"The Night Watch"	Fripp, Wetton, Palmer-James	5:21
7.	"Fracture"	Fripp	14:40
8.	"Book of Saturday"	Fripp, Wetton, Palmer-James	3:02
9.	"Lament"	Fripp, Wetton, Palmer-James	4:28
10.	"Improv II"	Cross, Fripp, Wetton, Bruford	9:32
11.	"Exiles"	Cross, Fripp, Wetton, Palmer-James	7:03

Disc 26 – Bonus Audio 2 – Audio Curios
No.	Title	Writer(s)	Length
1.	"The Talking Drum" (University of Texas, Arlington, Texas, 6 October 1973; end of Disc 25 concert)	Cross, Fripp, Wetton, Bruford, Muir	6:16
2.	"Larks' Tongues in Aspic (Part II)" (University of Texas, Arlington, Texas, 6 October 1973; end of Disc 25 concert)	Fripp	8:51
3.	"21st Century Schizoid Man" (University of Texas, Arlington, Texas, 6 October 1973; end of Disc 25 concert)	Fripp, McDonald, Lake, Giles, Sinfield	9:30
4.	"Doctor Diamond" (Richards Club, Atlanta, 23 June 1973)	Cross, Fripp, Wetton, Bruford, Palmer-James	4:00
5.	"The Law of Maximum Distress: Part I" (Improv; Volkshaus, Zurich, Switzerland, 15 November 1973)	Cross, Fripp, Wetton, Bruford	6:42
6.	"Improv: The Mincer" (complete improv minus the overdubs from bootleg source; Volkshaus, Zurich, Switzerland, 15 November 1973)	Cross, Fripp, Wetton, Bruford	4:22
7.	"The Law of Maximum Distress: Part II" (Improv; Volkshaus, Zurich, Switzerland, 15 November 1973)	Cross, Fripp, Wetton, Bruford	2:28
8.	"Easy Money" (Elzer Hof, Germany, 30 March 1974; bootleg source; end of Disc 15 concert)	Fripp, Wetton, Palmer-James	6:52
9.	"Fracture" (Elzer Hof, Germany, 30 March 1974; bootleg source; end of Disc 15 concert)	Fripp	11:25
10.	"Larks' Tongues in Aspic (Part II)" (Elzer Hof, Germany, 30 March 1974; bootleg source; end of Disc 15 concert)	Fripp	6:16

Disc 27 – Bonus Audio 3 – Palazzo dello Sport, Udine, Italy, 19 March 1974 (missing portion of Disc 7, with audio restored from bootleg)
No.	Title	Writer(s)	Length
1.	"Walk On: No Pussyfooting"	Fripp, Eno	0:28
2.	"Improv: Some Pussyfooting"	Cross, Fripp, Wetton, Bruford	1:28
3.	"Larks' Tongues in Aspic (Part I)"	Cross, Fripp, Wetton, Bruford, Muir	9:06
4.	"Lament"	Fripp, Wetton, Palmer-James	4:10
5.	"Doctor Diamond"	Cross, Fripp, Wetton, Bruford, Palmer-James	4:49
6.	"The Night Watch"	Fripp, Wetton, Palmer-James	4:36
7.	"The Great Deceiver"	Wetton, Fripp, Palmer-James	3:54
8.	"Guts on My Side"	Fripp, Wetton, Palmer-James	4:55
9.	"Improv II"	Cross, Fripp, Wetton, Bruford	9:50
10.	"Starless"	Cross, Fripp, Wetton, Bruford, Palmer-James	12:21
11.	"Book of Saturday"	Fripp, Wetton, Palmer-James	2:45
12.	"Exiles"	Cross, Fripp, Wetton, Palmer-James	7:03
13.	"Fracture"	Fripp	11:07

Bonus Download – Jahrhunderthalle, Frankfurt, Germany, 3 November 1973 (audio restored from bootleg)
No.	Title	Writer(s)	Length
1.	"Improv I"	Cross, Fripp, Wetton, Bruford	2:11
2.	"Larks' Tongues in Aspic (Part I)"	Cross, Fripp, Wetton, Bruford, Muir	7:51
3.	"RF Announcement"		0:44
4.	"Easy Money"	Fripp, Wetton, Palmer-James	6:28
5.	"The Night Watch"	Fripp, Wetton, Palmer-James	5:16
6.	"Fracture"	Fripp	11:23
7.	"Book of Saturday"	Fripp, Wetton, Palmer-James	3:05
8.	"Lament"	Fripp, Wetton, Palmer-James	4:23
9.	"Improv II"	Cross, Fripp, Wetton, Bruford	7:55
10.	"Exiles"	Cross, Fripp, Palmer-James	6:41
11.	"Larks' Tongues in Aspic (Part II)"	Fripp	5:12

== Personnel ==
King Crimson

- David Cross – violin, Mellotron, Hohner Pianet
- Robert Fripp – guitar, Mellotron, Hohner Pianet
- John Wetton – bass guitar, vocals
- Bill Bruford – drums, percussion

Additional personnel

- Richard Palmer-James – lyrics
