= Nashville Rehearsals =

Compilation album by King Crimson
- Released: November 2000
- Recorded: May 1997
- Studios: SIR Studios, Nashville, Tennessee, United States
- Genre: Progressive rock
- Label: Discipline Global Mobile
- Producers: Robert Fripp and David Singleton

King Crimson Collector's Club chronology
Live in Hyde Park (2000)	Nashville Rehearsals (2000)	Live at Plymouth Guildhall (2000)

Professional ratings
Review scores
Source	Rating
Allmusic	4/5 stars

Nashville Rehearsals is an album of studio writing sessions and rehearsals by the band King Crimson, released through the King Crimson Collector's Club in November 2000. The band were working towards a new King Crimson studio album, but decided progress was unsatisfactory and did not develop most of these ideas further, opting instead to 'fraKctalize' into the 'ProjeKcts', a succession of exploratory improvising sub-groups, in order to find new ideas.

The album includes liner notes by the band's official biographer, Sid Smith.

== Track listing ==
All music by Adrian Belew, Robert Fripp, Trey Gunn, Tony Levin, Bill Bruford and Pat Mastelotto

1. "Presidents" – 7:04
2. "Scapeplay" – 3:37
3. "Snugel" – 5:45
4. "Off Sets" – 4:24
5. "Big Funk" – 3:30
6. "Jimmy Bond" – 7:07
7. "Have U Got?" – 1:05
8. "Mulundrum" – 0:39
9. "Too Many eeee's" – 1:11
10. "Nice to Start" – 0:13
11. "Pat's Meckanical [sic] Fives" – 3:04
12. "Seizure" – 0:51
13. "Circulation" – 1:03
14. "KCF" – 0:32
15. "Ragin' Drone" – 3:42
16. "JB in 7" – 2:41
17. "Split Hands" – 4:36
18. "Sad Woman Jam" – 2:36
19. "Tony's Jam" – 12:59
20. "Trey, Pat and Bill" – 0:47

== Personnel ==
King Crimson

- Adrian Belew – guitar
- Robert Fripp – guitar
- Trey Gunn – Warr guitar
- Tony Levin – bass guitar, electric upright bass, Chapman Stick
- Bill Bruford – drums, percussion
- Pat Mastelotto – drums, percussion

Production personnel

- Ken Latchney – recording engineer
- Pat Mastelotto & Alex R. Mundy – digital editing
- David Singleton – mastering
- Tony Levin – photography
- Steve Jennings – live photo
- Hugh O'Donnell – design
