= Cirkus: The Young Persons' Guide to King Crimson Live =

Live album by King Crimson
- Released: 25 May 1999
- Recorded: 1969–1998
- Genre: Progressive rock
- Length: 144:12
- Label: Virgin
- Producer: Robert Fripp and David Singleton

King Crimson chronology
Absent Lovers: Live in Montreal (1998)	Cirkus: The Young Persons' Guide to King Crimson Live (1999)	Live in Mexico City (1999)

Professional ratings
Review scores
Source	Rating
Allmusic	3/5 stars

Cirkus: The Young Persons' Guide to King Crimson Live is a double live compilation album by the English progressive rock band King Crimson released in 1999 by Virgin Records, covering the first thirty years of the band's career.

== Track listing ==
All tracks are written by Belew, Fripp, Levin, Bruford except where noted.

Vol. 1 - Neon Heat Disease 1984-1998
No.	Title	Writer(s)	Date/venue	Length
1.	"Dinosaur"	Belew, Fripp, Gunn, Levin, Bruford, Mastelotto	2–4 August 1996 at Teatro Metropólitan, Mexico City	5:05
2.	"Thela Hun Ginjeet"		11 July 1984 at the Spectrum, Montreal	5:17
3.	"Red"	Fripp	2–4 August 1996 at Teatro Metropólitan, Mexico City	6:10
4.	"B'Boom"	Belew, Fripp, Gunn, Levin, Bruford, Mastelotto	2–4 August 1996 at Teatro Metropólitan, Mexico City	4:54
5.	"THRAK"	Belew, Fripp, Gunn, Levin, Bruford, Mastelotto	2–4 August 1996 at Teatro Metropólitan, Mexico City	1:04
6.	"1 ii 2" (ProjeKct One)	Fripp, Gunn, Levin, Bruford	1 December 1997 at the Jazz Cafe, London	2:43
7.	"Neurotica"		2–4 August 1996 at Teatro Metropólitan, Mexico City	3:43
8.	"Indiscipline"		5–6 October 1995 at Nakano Sun Plaza, Tokyo	6:40
9.	"VROOOM VROOOM"	Belew, Fripp, Gunn, Levin, Bruford, Mastelotto	2–4 August 1996 at Teatro Metropólitan, Mexico City	4:42
10.	"Coda: Marine 475"	Belew, Fripp, Gunn, Levin, Bruford, Mastelotto	2–4 August 1996 at Teatro Metropólitan, Mexico City	2:38
11.	"The Deception of the Thrush" (ProjeKct Two)	Fripp, Gunn, Belew	1 July 1998 at Pearl Street, Northampton, MA	6:05
12.	"Heavy ConstruKction" (ProjeKct Two)	Fripp, Gunn, Belew	1 July 1998 at Pearl Street, Northampton, MA	3:52
13.	"Three of a Perfect Pair"		11 July 1984 at the Spectrum, Montreal	4:23
14.	"Sleepless"		11 July 1984 at the Spectrum, Montreal	6:10
15.	"Elephant Talk"		5–6 October 1995 at Nakano Sun Plaza, Tokyo	4:36

Musicians (disc 1)

- Adrian Belew – guitar & lead vocals (except 6, 11, 12), V-Drums (11 & 12)
- Robert Fripp – guitar
- Trey Gunn – touch guitar (except 2, 13 & 14)
- Tony Levin – basses & Stick (except 11 & 12)
- Bill Bruford – drums & percussion (except 11 & 12)
- Pat Mastelotto – drums & percussion (1, 3–5, 7–10, 15)

Vol. 2 - Fractured 1969-1996
No.	Title	Writer(s)	Date/venue	Length
1.	"21st Century Schizoid Man"	Fripp, McDonald, Lake, Giles, Sinfield	26 February 1972 at the Baseball Park, Jacksonville, FL	9:26
2.	"Ladies of the Road"	Fripp, Sinfield	27 February 1972 at Kemp Coliseum, Orlando, FL	6:00
3.	"A Man, A City"	Fripp, McDonald, Lake, Giles, Sinfield	14 December 1969 at Fillmore West, San Francisco, CA	10:00
4.	"The Court of the Crimson King"	McDonald, Sinfield	14 December 1969 at Fillmore West, San Francisco, CA	6:50
5.	"Fracture"	Fripp	24 June 1974 at Massey Hall, Toronto	11:04
6.	"Easy Money"	Fripp, Wetton, Palmer-James	23 November 1973 at Concertgebouw, Amsterdam	6:12
7.	"Improv: Besançon"	Cross, Fripp, Wetton, Bruford	25 March 1974 at Palais des Sports, Besançon	1:37
8.	"The Talking Drum"	Cross, Fripp, Wetton, Bruford, Muir	23 November 1973 at Concertgebouw, Amsterdam	6:25
9.	"Larks' Tongues in Aspic (Part II)"	Fripp	2–4 August 1996 at the Teatro Metropólitan, Mexico City	6:29
10.	"Starless"	Cross, Fripp, Wetton, Bruford, Palmer-James	29 April 1974 at Stanley Warner Theatre, Pittsburgh, PA	12:07

Musicians (disc 2)

- Robert Fripp: Guitar, Mellotron & Hohner Pianet
- Mel Collins – saxes & flute (1–2)
- Boz Burrell – bass guitar & lead vocals (1–2)
- Ian Wallace – drums, percussion & vocals (1–2)
- Ian McDonald – alto sax, flute, Mellotron & vocals (3–4)
- Greg Lake – bass guitar & lead vocals (3–4)
- Michael Giles – drums, percussion & vocals (3–4)
- David Cross – violin, Mellotron & Hohner Pianet (5–8, 10)
- John Wetton – bass guitar & lead vocals (5–8, 10)
- Bill Bruford – drums & percussion (5–10)
- Adrian Belew – guitar (9)
- Trey Gunn – touch guitar (9)
- Tony Levin – basses & Stick (9)
- Pat Mastelotto – drums & percussion (9)

Production personnel

- Robert Fripp and David Singleton – editing and mastering
- P.J. Crook – cover artwork
- Hugh O'Donnell – design
