= THRAK (box set) =

THRAK (King Crimson Live and Studio Recordings 1994–1997)

Box set by King Crimson
- Released: 2015
- Genres: Progressive rock, Heavy metal
- Labels: Discipline Global Mobile; Panegyric; Inner Knot
- Producer: King Crimson

King Crimson chronology
Starless (2014)	THRAK (King Crimson Live and Studio Recordings 1994–1997) (2015)	On (and off) The Road (1981–1984) (2016)

THRAK (King Crimson Live and Studio Recordings 1994–1997) is the fifth of the major box set releases from English progressive rock group King Crimson, released in 2015 by Discipline Global Mobile & Panegyric Records.

Based around the studio album THRAK (1995), the release expands on it with various mixes, alternate takes and live recordings.

The collection consists of 12 CDs, 2 Blu-ray discs, 1 DVD-A and 1 DVD. It is a limited edition which features both studio and live recordings by King Crimson's during the period of the mid-1990s line-up referred to as the double trio. It includes Jakko Jakszyk and Robert Fripp remixed reinterpretation of THRAK (1995), a set of improvisations known as "ATTAKcATHRAK", also Maximum VROOOM and the mini-album VROOOM (1994).

== Track listing ==
Disc 1 – JurassiKc THRAK
No.	Title	Length
1.	"JurassiKc THRAK"	67:22

Disc 2 – Maximum VROOOM
No.	Title	Length
1.	"VROOOM" (includes "Coda: Marine 475")	7:34
2.	"Sex Sleep Eat Drink Dream"	4:42
3.	"Cage"	1:35
4.	"THRAK"	7:19
5.	"When I Say Stop, Continue"	5:20
6.	"One Time"	4:28
7.	"Funky Jam"	4:30
8.	"Fashionable"	4:22
9.	"Krim 3"	3:16
10.	"Bass Groove"	4:13
11.	"Calliope"	4:03
12.	"No Questions Asked"	3:21
13.	"Monster Jam"	8:16

All lyrics are written by Adrian Belew, except "Coda: Marine 475" by Robert Fripp; all music is composed by Belew, Bill Bruford, Fripp, Trey Gunn, Tony Levin and Pat Mastelotto.

Disc 3 – THRAK original mix (2002 Remaster)
No.	Title	Length
1.	"VROOOM" (instrumental)	4:38
2.	"Coda: Marine 475"	2:42
3.	"Dinosaur"	6:37
4.	"Walking on Air"	4:38
5.	"B'Boom" (instrumental)	4:11
6.	"THRAK" (instrumental)	3:59
7.	"Inner Garden I"	1:47
8.	"People"	5:53
9.	"Radio I" (instrumental)	0:44
10.	"One Time"	5:21
11.	"Radio II" (instrumental)	1:03
12.	"Inner Garden II"	1:16
13.	"Sex Sleep Eat Drink Dream"	4:50
14.	"VROOOM VROOOM" (instrumental)	5:50
15.	"VROOOM VROOOM: Coda" (instrumental)	3:01

Disc 4 – ATTAKcATHRAK (The Vicar's THRAK)
No.	Title	Length
1.	"ATTAKcATHRAK: Part I"	10:41
2.	"Fans, Sloth, Nuns, Felons"	9:31
3.	"ATTAKcATHRAK: Part II"	7:59
4.	"Declamatory Doth Madden"	10:23
5.	"Witnessing Dumb Whodunnits"	10:46

All lyrics are written by Adrian Belew, except "Coda: Marine 475" by Robert Fripp; all music is composed by Belew, Bill Bruford, Fripp, Trey Gunn, Tony Levin and Pat Mastelotto.

Disc 5 – THRAK (2015 mix)
No.	Title	Length
1.	"VROOOM" (instrumental)	4:34
2.	"Coda: Marine 475"	2:36
3.	"Dinosaur"	6:37
4.	"Walking on Air"	4:43
5.	"B'Boom" (instrumental)	4:10
6.	"THRAK" (instrumental)	3:59
7.	"Inner Garden I"	1:47
8.	"People"	5:51
9.	"Radio I" (instrumental)	0:42
10.	"One Time"	5:22
11.	"Radio II" (instrumental)	0:57
12.	"Inner Garden II"	1:16
13.	"Sex Sleep Eat Drink Dream"	4:46
14.	"VROOOM VROOOM" (instrumental)	5:52
15.	"VROOOM VROOOM: Coda" (instrumental)	2:57

Disc 6 – Byte-Size THRAK
No.	Title	Writer(s)	Length
1.	"Cloudscape"	Fripp	1:17
2.	"Elephant Talk" (Live at the Broadway Theatre, Buenos Aires, Argentina, October 1994)	Belew, Bruford, Fripp, Levin	4:19
3.	"Red" (Live at the Broadway Theatre, Buenos Aires, Argentina, October 1994)	Fripp	6:08
4.	"Walking on Air" (Live at the Wiltern Theatre, San Francisco, 1 July 1995)		5:25
5.	"Heartbeat" (Live in Córdoba, Argentina, 10 October 1994)	Belew, Bruford, Fripp, Levin	3:52
6.	"Dinosaur" (Single edit)		3:43
7.	"One Time" (Edited version)		4:00
8.	"Sex Sleep Eat Drink Dream" (Edited version)		3:43
9.	"People" (Edited version)		3:49
10.	"Walking on Air" (Edited version)		3:16
11.	"Dinosaur" (Album edit)		4:41
12.	"People" (Remix)		5:43
13.	"Jimmy Bond" (1997 rehearsal)		7:06
14.	"Sad Woman Jam" (1997 rehearsal)		2:36
15.	"Tony's Jam" (1997 rehearsal)		12:29
16.	"Silent Night à la Frippertronics" (Recorded in New York City, 1979)	Franz Xaver Gruber, Fripp	2:55

Disc 7 – Kcensington THRAK: Royal Albert Hall, Kensington and Chelsea, London, England, 17–18 May 1995 (part 1)
No.	Title	Writer(s)	Length
1.	"Entry of the Crims" (Walk On: Improv)		0:36
2.	"VROOOM"		4:03
3.	"Coda: Marine 475" (Coda)		2:52
4.	"Frame by Frame"	Belew, Bruford, Fripp, Levin	5:21
5.	"Dinosaur"		7:02
6.	"One Time"		5:45
7.	"Red"	Fripp	6:06
8.	"B'Boom"		6:02
9.	"THRAK"		5:31

Disc 8 – Kcensington THRAK: Royal Albert Hall, Kensington and Chelsea, London, England, 17–18 May 1995 (part 2)
No.	Title	Writer(s)	Length
1.	"Heartbeat"	Belew, Bruford, Fripp, Levin	3:52
2.	"Matte Kudasai" (待ってください, Please Wait for Me)	Belew, Bruford, Fripp, Levin	3:40
3.	"Sex Sleep Eat Drink Dream"		4:48
4.	"People"		6:20
5.	"VROOOM VROOOM"		4:58
6.	"Two Sticks" (Improv)	Gunn, Levin	1:19
7.	"Elephant Talk"	Belew, Bruford, Fripp, Levin	4:06
8.	"Indiscipline"	Belew, Bruford, Fripp, Levin	10:08
9.	"Prism"	Pierre Favre	2:17
10.	"The Talking Drum"	David Cross, Fripp, John Wetton, Bruford, Jamie Muir	2:44
11.	"Larks' Tongues in Aspic (Part II)"	Fripp	9:20
12.	"Walking on Air"		5:24

Disc 9 – New YorKc THRAK: On Broadway, 20–25 November 1995 (part 1)
No.	Title	Writer(s)	Length
1.	"Conundrum"	Bruford, Mastelotto	1:56
2.	"Thela Hun Ginjeet"	Belew, Bruford, Fripp, Levin	6:43
3.	"Red"	Fripp	6:27
4.	"Dinosaur"		7:17
5.	"VROOOM VROOOM"		4:47
6.	"Frame by Frame"	Belew, Bruford, Fripp, Levin	5:11
7.	"Walking on Air"		5:27
8.	"B'Boom"		5:37
9.	"THRAK"		6:31
10.	"Neurotica"	Belew, Bruford, Fripp, Levin	4:33
11.	"Sex Sleep Eat Drink Dream"		4:57

Disc 10 – New YorKc THRAK: On Broadway, 20–25 November 1995 (part 2)
No.	Title	Writer(s)	Length
1.	"People"		6:12
2.	"One Time"		5:55
3.	"Indiscipline"	Belew, Bruford, Fripp, Levin	7:15
4.	"Two Sticks" (Improv)	Gunn, Levin	1:51
5.	"Elephant Talk"	Belew, Bruford, Fripp, Levin	4:28
6.	"Prism"	Favre	3:56
7.	"The Talking Drum"	Cross, Fripp, Wetton, Bruford, Muir	2:58
8.	"Larks' Tongues in Aspic, Part Two"	Fripp	7:28
9.	"Three of a Perfect Pair"	Belew, Bruford, Fripp, Levin	4:22
10.	"VROOOM"		3:56
11.	"Coda: Marine 475"		2:39
12.	"Fearless and Highly THRaKked" (Improv)		1:53
13.	"Free as a Bird" (Solo Belew performance based on a demo)	John Lennon	3:13

Disc 11 – AzteKc THRAK: Live in Mexico City, 2–4 August 1996 (part 1)
No.	Title	Writer(s)	Length
1.	"Conundrum"	Bruford, Mastelotto	2:01
2.	"Thela Hun Ginjeet"	Belew, Bruford, Fripp, Levin	5:53
3.	"Red"	Fripp	6:32
4.	"Frame by Frame"	Belew, Bruford, Fripp, Levin	5:17
5.	"Dinosaur"		6:49
6.	"One Time"		5:53
7.	"VROOOM VROOOM"		5:05
8.	"Matte Kudasai" (待ってください, Please Wait for Me)	Belew, Bruford, Fripp, Levin	3:23
9.	"B'Boom"		4:52
10.	"THRAK"		6:31

Disc 12 – AzteKc THRAK: Live in Mexico City, 2–4 August 1996 (part 2)
No.	Title	Writer(s)	Length
1.	"Waiting Man"	Belew, Bruford, Fripp, Levin	4:35
2.	"Neurotica"	Belew, Bruford, Fripp, Levin	3:45
3.	"The Sheltering Sky"	Belew, Bruford, Fripp, Levin	6:37
4.	"Three of a Perfect Pair"	Belew, Bruford, Fripp, Levin	4:20
5.	"VROOOM"		3:54
6.	"Marine 475" (Coda)		2:42
7.	"Sex Sleep Eat Drink Dream"		4:58
8.	"Two Sticks" (Improv)	Gunn, Levin	0:33
9.	"Elephant Talk"	Belew, Bruford, Fripp, Levin	4:21
10.	"Indiscipline"	Belew, Bruford, Fripp, Levin	7:52
11.	"Prism"	Favre	4:22
12.	"The Talking Drum"	Cross, Fripp, Wetton, Bruford, Muir	3:57
13.	"Larks' Tongues in Aspic (Part II)"	Fripp	7:10
14.	"Biker Babes of the Rio Grande" (Improv)		2:25
15.	"21st Century Schizoid Man"	Fripp, Ian McDonald, Greg Lake, Michael Giles, Peter Sinfield	7:35

Disc 13 – DVD-A audio content: THRAK 2015 mix in 24/96, THRAK original mix (2002 remaster) in 24/96, THRAK in 5.1 surround mix
No.	Title	Length
1.	"VROOOM" (THRAK 2015 Mix – instrumental)	4:34
2.	"Coda: Marine 475" (THRAK 2015 Mix)	2:36
3.	"Dinosaur" (THRAK 2015 Mix)	6:37
4.	"Walking on Air" (THRAK 2015 Mix)	4:43
5.	"B'Boom" (THRAK 2015 Mix – instrumental)	4:10
6.	"THRAK" (THRAK 2015 Mix – instrumental)	3:59
7.	"Inner Garden I" (THRAK 2015 Mix)	1:47
8.	"People" (THRAK 2015 Mix)	5:51
9.	"Radio I" (THRAK 2015 Mix – instrumental)	0:42
10.	"One Time" (THRAK 2015 Mix)	5:22
11.	"Radio II" (THRAK 2015 Mix – instrumental)	0:57
12.	"Inner Garden II" (THRAK 2015 Mix)	1:16
13.	"Sex Sleep Eat Drink Dream" (THRAK 2015 Mix)	4:46
14.	"VROOOM VROOOM" (THRAK 2015 Mix – instrumental)	5:52
15.	"VROOOM VROOOM: Coda" (THRAK 2015 Mix – instrumental)	2:57
16.	"VROOOM" (THRAK Original Mix 2002 Remaster – instrumental)	4:38
17.	"Coda: Marine 475" (THRAK Original Mix 2002 Remaster)	2:42
18.	"Dinosaur" (THRAK Original Mix 2002 Remaster)	6:37
19.	"Walking on Air" (THRAK Original Mix 2002 Remaster)	4:38
20.	"B'Boom" (THRAK Original Mix 2002 Remaster – instrumental)	4:11
21.	"THRAK" (THRAK Original Mix 2002 Remaster – instrumental)	3:59
22.	"Inner Garden I" (THRAK Original Mix 2002 Remaster)	1:47
23.	"People"
24.	Untitled (THRAK Original Mix 2002 Remaster)	5:53
25.	"Radio I" (THRAK Original Mix 2002 Remaster – instrumental)	0:44
26.	"One Time" (THRAK Original Mix 2002 Remaster)	5:21
27.	"Radio II" (THRAK Original Mix 2002 Remaster – instrumental)	1:03
28.	"Inner Garden II" (THRAK Original Mix 2002 Remaster)	1:16
29.	"Sex Sleep Eat Drink Dream" (THRAK Original Mix 2002 Remaster)	4:50
30.	"VROOOM VROOOM" (THRAK Original Mix 2002 Remaster – instrumental)	5:50
31.	"VROOOM VROOOM: Coda" (THRAK Original Mix 2002 Remaster – instrumental)	3:01

Disc 14 – DVD video content: Live at the Warfield Theatre, Tony's Road Movies, THRAK EPK in stereo 24/48 and surround
No.	Title	Writer(s)	Length
1.	"Red" (The Warfield Theatre, San Francisco, CA, June 26, 1995)	Fripp	5:16
2.	"B'Boom" (The Warfield Theatre, San Francisco, CA, June 26, 1995)		6:14
3.	"THRAK" (The Warfield Theatre, San Francisco, CA, June 26, 1995)		5:45
4.	"Matte Kudasai" (The Warfield Theatre, San Francisco, CA, June 26, 1995 – 待ってください, Please Wait for Me)	Belew, Bruford, Fripp, Levin	3:41
5.	"VROOOM" (The Warfield Theatre, San Francisco, CA, June 26, 1995)		4:09
6.	"Coda: Marine 475" (The Warfield Theatre, San Francisco, CA, June 26, 1995)		2:36
7.	"Dinosaur" (The Warfield Theatre, San Francisco, CA, June 26, 1995)		7:09
8.	"One Time" (The Warfield Theatre, San Francisco, CA, June 26, 1995)		6:12
9.	"People" (The Warfield Theatre, San Francisco, CA, June 26, 1995)		6:16
10.	"VROOOM VROOOM" (The Warfield Theatre, San Francisco, CA, June 26, 1995)		4:54
11.	"Two Sticks" (The Warfield Theatre, San Francisco, CA, June 26, 1995 – Improv)	Gunn, Levin	2:53
12.	"Elephant Talk" (The Warfield Theatre, San Francisco, CA, June 26, 1995)	Belew, Bruford, Fripp, Levin	4:16
13.	"Indiscipline" (The Warfield Theatre, San Francisco, CA, June 26, 1995)	Belew, Bruford, Fripp, Levin	9:22
14.	"Prism" (The Warfield Theatre, San Francisco, CA, June 26, 1995)	Favre	2:23
15.	"The Talking Drum" (The Warfield Theatre, San Francisco, CA, June 26, 1995)	Cross, Fripp, Wetton, Bruford, Muir	3:03
16.	"Larks' Tongues in Aspic, Part Two" (The Warfield Theatre, San Francisco, CA, June 26, 1995)	Fripp	9:37
17.	"Walking on Air" (The Warfield Theatre, San Francisco, CA, June 26, 1995)		5:54
18.	"The Race" (Tony's Road Movies)		6:18
19.	"Rehearsal I" (Tony's Road Movies)		0:48
20.	"Rehearsal II" (Tony's Road Movies)		2:57
21.	"Dressing Room" (Tony's Road Movies)		2:19
22.	"Tokyo" (Tony's Road Movies)		0:55
23.	"From the Hotel" (Tony's Road Movies)		0:53
24.	"Mr. Bill at the Station" (Tony's Road Movies)		3:11

Disc 15 – Blu-ray Disc 1 audio content: THRAK, ATTAKcATHRAK, Kcensington THRAK in surround mixes and stereo mixes; THRaKaTTaK, JurrassiKc THRAK, B'Boom in stereo 24/48
No.	Title	Writer(s)	Length
1.	"VROOOM" (THRAK 2015 Mix)		4:34
2.	"Coda: Marine 475" (THRAK 2015 Mix)		2:36
3.	"Dinosaur" (THRAK 2015 Mix)		6:37
4.	"Walking On Air" (THRAK 2015 Mix)		4:43
5.	"B'Boom" (THRAK 2015 Mix)		4:10
6.	"THRAK" (THRAK 2015 Mix)		3:59
7.	"Inner Garden I" (THRAK 2015 Mix)		1:47
8.	"People" (THRAK 2015 Mix)		5:51
9.	"Radio I" (THRAK 2015 Mix)		0:42
10.	"One Time" (THRAK 2015 Mix)		5:22
11.	"Radio II" (THRAK 2015 Mix)		0:57
12.	"Inner Garden II" (THRAK 2015 Mix)		1:16
13.	"Sex Sleep Eat Drink Dream" (THRAK 2015 Mix)		4:46
14.	"VROOOM VROOOM" (THRAK 2015 Mix)		5:32
15.	"VROOOM VROOOM: Coda" (THRAK 2015 Mix)		2:57
16.	"ATTAKcATHRAK: Part I" (ATTAKcATHRAK)		10:41
17.	"Fans, Sloth, Nuns, Felons" (ATTAKcATHRAK)		9:31
18.	"ATTAKcATHRAK: Part II" (ATTAKcATHRAK)		7:59
19.	"Declamatory Doth Madden" (ATTAKcATHRAK)		10:23
20.	"Witnessing Dumb Whodunnits" (ATTAKcATHRAK)		10:46
21.	"VROOOM" (THRAK Original Mix – 2002 Remaster)		4:38
22.	"Coda: Marine 475" (THRAK Original Mix – 2002 Remaster)		2:42
23.	"Dinosaur" (THRAK Original Mix – 2002 Remaster)		6:37
24.	"Walking On Air" (THRAK Original Mix – 2002 Remaster)		4:36
25.	"B'Boom" (THRAK Original Mix – 2002 Remaster)		4:11
26.	"THRAK" (THRAK Original Mix – 2002 Remaster)		3:59
27.	"Inner Garden I" (THRAK Original Mix – 2002 Remaster)		1:47
28.	"People" (THRAK Original Mix – 2002 Remaster)		5:53
29.	"Radio I" (THRAK Original Mix – 2002 Remaster)		0:44
30.	"One Time" (THRAK Original Mix – 2002 Remaster)		5:21
31.	"Radio II" (THRAK Original Mix – 2002 Remaster)		1:03
32.	"Inner Garden II" (THRAK Original Mix – 2002 Remaster)		1:16
33.	"Sex Sleep Eat Drink Dream" (THRAK Original Mix – 2002 Remaster)		4:48
34.	"VROOOM VROOOM" (THRAK Original Mix – 2002 Remaster)		5:35
35.	"VROOOM VROOOM: Coda" (THRAK Original Mix – 2002 Remaster)		3:01
36.	"THRAK" (THRaKaTTaK)		2:20
37.	"Fearless and Highly THRAKked" (THRaKaTTaK)		6:36
38.	"Mother Hold the Candle Steady While I Shave the Chicken's Lip" (THRaKaTTaK)		11:19
39.	"THRaKaTTaK Part I" (THRaKaTTaK)		3:42
40.	"The Slaughter of the Innocents" (THRaKaTTaK)		8:03
41.	"This Night Wounds Time" (THRaKaTTaK)		11:17
42.	"THRaKaTTaK Part II" (THRaKaTTaK)		11:08
43.	"THRAK" (THRaKaTTaK)		2:52
44.	"Entry Of The Crims" (Kcensington THRAK)		0:36
45.	"VROOOM" (Kcensington THRAK)		4:03
46.	"Coda: Marine 475" (Kcensington THRAK)		2:52
47.	"Frame By Frame" (Kcensington THRAK)		5:21
48.	"Dinosaur" (Kcensington THRAK)		7:02
49.	"One Time" (Kcensington THRAK)		5:45
50.	"Red" (Kcensington THRAK)		6:06
51.	"B'Boom" (Kcensington THRAK)		6:02
52.	"THRAK" (Kcensington THRAK)		5:31
53.	"Heartbeat" (Kcensington THRAK)	Belew, Bruford, Fripp, Levin	3:52
54.	"Matte Kudasai" (Kcensington THRAK – 待ってください, Please Wait for Me)	Belew, Bruford, Fripp, Levin	3:40
55.	"Sex Sleep Eat Drink Dream" (Kcensington THRAK)		4:48
56.	"People" (Kcensington THRAK)		6:20
57.	"VROOOM VROOOM" (Kcensington THRAK)		4:58
58.	"Two Sticks" (Kcensington THRAK – Improv)	Gunn, Levin	1:19
59.	"Elephant Talk" (Kcensington THRAK)	Belew, Bruford, Fripp, Levin	4:06
60.	"Indiscipline" (Kcensington THRAK)	Belew, Bruford, Fripp, Levin	10:08
61.	"Prism" (Kcensington THRAK)	Pierre Favre	2:17
62.	"The Talking Drum" (Kcensington THRAK)	David Cross, Fripp, John Wetton, Bruford, Jamie Muir	2:44
63.	"Larks' Tongues in Aspic (Part II)" (Kcensington THRAK)	Fripp	9:20
64.	"Walking on Air" (Kcensington THRAK)		5:24
65.	"VROOOM" (B'Boom – includes "Coda: Marine 475")		7:07
66.	"Frame by Frame" (B'Boom)	Belew, Bruford, Fripp, Levin	5:28
67.	"Sex Sleep Eat Drink Dream" (B'Boom)		5:23
68.	"Red" (B'Boom)	Fripp	4:58
69.	"One Time" (B'Boom)		5:45
70.	"B'Boom" (B'Boom)		6:54
71.	"THRAK" (B'Boom)		6:29
72.	"Two Sticks" (B'Boom – Improv)	Gunn, Levin	1:26
73.	"Elephant Talk" (B'Boom)	Belew, Bruford, Fripp, Levin	4:25
74.	"Indiscipline" (B'Boom)	Belew, Bruford, Fripp, Levin	7:38
75.	"VROOOM VROOOM" (B'Boom)		6:18
76.	"Matte Kudasai" (B'Boom – 待ってください, Please Wait for Me)	Belew, Bruford, Fripp, Levin	3:43
77.	"The Talking Drum" (B'Boom)	Cross, Fripp, Wetton, Bruford, Muir	5:52
78.	"Larks' Tongues in Aspic (Part II)" (B'Boom)	Fripp	7:31
79.	"Heartbeat" (B'Boom)	Belew, Bruford, Fripp, Levin	5:02
80.	"Sleepless" (B'Boom)	Belew, Bruford, Fripp, Levin	6:11
81.	"People" (B'Boom)		5:51
82.	"B'Boom" (B'Boom – Reprise)		4:26
83.	"THRAK" (B'Boom)		5:33
84.	"JurassiKc THRAK"		67:22

Disc 16 – Blu-ray Disc 2 video content: Live at the Warfield Theatre, Live at the Nakano Sun Plaza, Tony's Road Movies, THRAK EPK in stereo 24/48 and surround
No.	Title	Writer(s)	Length
1.	"Red" (The Warfield Theatre, San Francisco, CA, June 26, 1995)	Fripp	5:16
2.	"B'Boom" (The Warfield Theatre, San Francisco, CA, June 26, 1995)		6:14
3.	"THRAK" (The Warfield Theatre, San Francisco, CA, June 26, 1995)		5:45
4.	"Matte Kudasai" (The Warfield Theatre, San Francisco, CA, June 26, 1995 – 待ってください, Please Wait for Me)	Belew, Bruford, Fripp, Levin	3:41
5.	"VROOOM" (The Warfield Theatre, San Francisco, CA, June 26, 1995)		4:09
6.	"Coda: Marine 475" (The Warfield Theatre, San Francisco, CA, June 26, 1995)		2:36
7.	"Dinosaur" (The Warfield Theatre, San Francisco, CA, June 26, 1995)		7:09
8.	"One Time" (The Warfield Theatre, San Francisco, CA, June 26, 1995)		6:12
9.	"People" (The Warfield Theatre, San Francisco, CA, June 26, 1995)		6:16
10.	"VROOOM VROOOM" (The Warfield Theatre, San Francisco, CA, June 26, 1995)		4:54
11.	"Two Sticks" (The Warfield Theatre, San Francisco, CA, June 26, 1995 – Improv)	Gunn, Levin	2:53
12.	"Elephant Talk" (The Warfield Theatre, San Francisco, CA, June 26, 1995)	Belew, Bruford, Fripp, Levin	4:16
13.	"Indiscipline" (The Warfield Theatre, San Francisco, CA, June 26, 1995)	Belew, Bruford, Fripp, Levin	9:22
14.	"Prism" (The Warfield Theatre, San Francisco, CA, June 26, 1995)	Favre	2:23
15.	"The Talking Drum" (The Warfield Theatre, San Francisco, CA, June 26, 1995)	Cross, Fripp, Wetton, Bruford, Muir	3:03
16.	"Larks' Tongues in Aspic, Part Two" (The Warfield Theatre, San Francisco, CA, June 26, 1995)	Fripp	9:37
17.	"Walking on Air" (The Warfield Theatre, San Francisco, CA, June 26, 1995)		5:54
18.	"Intro" (déjà VROOOM – Live At The Nakano Sun Plaza, Tokyo, Japan, 5–6 October 1995)		0:30
19.	"Walk On" (déjà VROOOM – Live At The Nakano Sun Plaza, Tokyo, Japan, 5–6 October 1995)		2:54
20.	"Circular Improv" (déjà VROOOM – Live At The Nakano Sun Plaza, Tokyo, Japan, 5–6 October 1995)		2:09
21.	"VROOOM" (déjà VROOOM – Live At The Nakano Sun Plaza, Tokyo, Japan, 5–6 October 1995)		3:58
22.	"Coda: Marine 475" (déjà VROOOM – Live At The Nakano Sun Plaza, Tokyo, Japan, 5–6 October 1995)		2:36
23.	"Frame by Frame" (déjà VROOOM – Live At The Nakano Sun Plaza, Tokyo, Japan, 5–6 October 1995)	Belew, Bruford, Fripp, Levin	5:19
24.	"Dinosaur" (déjà VROOOM – Live At The Nakano Sun Plaza, Tokyo, Japan, 5–6 October 1995)		6:54
25.	"One Time" (déjà VROOOM – Live At The Nakano Sun Plaza, Tokyo, Japan, 5–6 October 1995)		5:41
26.	"Red" (déjà VROOOM – Live At The Nakano Sun Plaza, Tokyo, Japan, 5–6 October 1995)	Fripp	6:16
27.	"B'Boom" (déjà VROOOM – Live At The Nakano Sun Plaza, Tokyo, Japan, 5–6 October 1995)		7:26
28.	"THRAK" (déjà VROOOM – Live At The Nakano Sun Plaza, Tokyo, Japan, 5–6 October 1995)		6:19
29.	"Matte Kudasai" (déjà VROOOM – Live At The Nakano Sun Plaza, Tokyo, Japan, 5–6 October 1995 – 待ってください, Please Wait for Me)	Belew, Bruford, Fripp, Levin	3:30
30.	"Three of a Perfect Pair" (déjà VROOOM – Live At The Nakano Sun Plaza, Tokyo, Japan, 5–6 October 1995)	Belew, Bruford, Fripp, Levin	4:14
31.	"VROOOM VROOOM" (déjà VROOOM – Live At The Nakano Sun Plaza, Tokyo, Japan, 5–6 October 1995)		4:59
32.	"Sex Sleep Eat Drink Dream" (déjà VROOOM – Live At The Nakano Sun Plaza, Tokyo, Japan, 5–6 October 1995)		4:51
33.	"Two Sticks" (déjà VROOOM – Live At The Nakano Sun Plaza, Tokyo, Japan, 5–6 October 1995 – Improv)	Gunn, Levin	2:19
34.	"Elephant Talk" (déjà VROOOM – Live At The Nakano Sun Plaza, Tokyo, Japan, 5–6 October 1995)	Belew, Bruford, Fripp, Levin	4:00
35.	"Indiscipline" (déjà VROOOM – Live At The Nakano Sun Plaza, Tokyo, Japan, 5–6 October 1995)	Belew, Bruford, Fripp, Levin	6:41
36.	"The Talking Drum" (déjà VROOOM – Live At The Nakano Sun Plaza, Tokyo, Japan, 5–6 October 1995)	Cross, Fripp, Wetton, Bruford, Muir	3:26
37.	"Larks' Tongues in Aspic (Part II)" (déjà VROOOM – Live At The Nakano Sun Plaza, Tokyo, Japan, 5–6 October 1995)	Fripp	6:16
38.	"People" (déjà VROOOM – Live At The Nakano Sun Plaza, Tokyo, Japan, 5–6 October 1995)		5:48
39.	"Walking on Air" (déjà VROOOM – Live At The Nakano Sun Plaza, Tokyo, Japan, 5–6 October 1995)		5:42
40.	"The Race" (Tony's Road Movies)		6:18
41.	"Rehearsal I" (Tony's Road Movies)		0:48
42.	"Rehearsal II" (Tony's Road Movies)		2:57
43.	"Dressing Room" (Tony's Road Movies)		2:19
44.	"Tokyo" (Tony's Road Movies)		0:55
45.	"From the Hotel" (Tony's Road Movies)		0:53
46.	"Mr. Bill at the Station" (Tony's Road Movies)		3:11
47.	"Electronic Press Kit" (THRAK EPK)		16:39

== Personnel ==
- Adrian Belew – guitar, lead vocals
- Robert Fripp – guitar, Mellotron, soundscapes
- Trey Gunn – Chapman Stick, Warr guitar, backing vocals
- Tony Levin – bass guitar, electric upright bass, Chapman Stick, backing vocals
- Bill Bruford – drums
- Pat Mastelotto – drums, custom percussion
