= Live at Moles Club, Bath =

Live album by Discipline
- Released: June 2000
- Recorded: April 30, 1981
- Venue: Moles Club, Bath, Somerset, England
- Genre: Progressive rock, new wave
- Length: 53:46
- Label: Discipline Global Mobile
- Producer: Robert Fripp and David Singleton

King Crimson Collector's Club chronology
| Live in Central Park, NYC (2000) | Live at Moles Club, Bath (2000) | Live in Hyde Park (2000) |

Professional ratings
Review scores
| Source | Rating |
|---|---|
| Allmusic | 3/5 stars |

Live at Moles Club, Bath is a live album by the band King Crimson derived from a lo-fi audience bootleg recorded on April 30, 1981 and originally made available through the King Crimson Collector's Club in June 2000. The original Collector's Club release credits the album to "Discipline", the name that Robert Fripp gave this lineup before changing it to King Crimson. Despite its poor quality, the recording is of historical significance as it documents the first live performance by the Discipline-era band.

The album includes liner notes by the band's bass player, Tony Levin.

== Track listing ==
All songs written by Adrian Belew, Robert Fripp, Tony Levin and Bill Bruford, except tracks 3 and 9 which were written by Robert Fripp.

1. "Discipline" – 5:57
2. "Thela Hun Ginjeet" – 5:42
3. "Red" – 6:11
4. "Elephant Talk" – 4:45
5. "Matte Kudasai" – 3:43
6. "The Sheltering Sky" – 8:48
7. "Indiscipline" – 7:02
8. "Frame by Frame" – 4:58
9. "Larks' Tongues in Aspic (Part II)" – 6:37

== Personnel ==
Discipline

- Adrian Belew – guitar, lead vocals
- Robert Fripp – guitar
- Tony Levin – bass guitar, Chapman Stick, backing vocals
- Bill Bruford – drums, percussion

Production personnel

- Alex R. Mundy – digital editing
- David Singleton – mastering
- Tony Levin – photography
- Hugh O'Donnell – design
