= Live at Plymouth Guildhall =

Live album by King Crimson
- Released: December 2000
- Recorded: May 11, 1971
- Venue: Guildhall, Plymouth, Devon, UK
- Genre: Progressive rock
- Label: Discipline Global Mobile
- Producer: David Singleton and Alex R. Mundy

King Crimson Collector's Club chronology
Nashville Rehearsals (2000)	Live at Plymouth Guildhall (2000)	Live in Mainz (2001)

Professional ratings
Review scores
Source	Rating
Allmusic	3/5 stars

Live at Plymouth Guildhall is a live album (2-CD set) by the band King Crimson, released through the King Crimson Collector's Club in December 2000. The album was recorded at the Guildhall in Plymouth, England on 11 May 1971, the fifth-ever live performance by the Islands version of King Crimson and their first in the UK. The CD release was derived from the original soundboard tape, mixed by Peter Sinfield. An audience bootleg was added to repair the missing introduction to "Get Thy Bearings".

The liner notes were written by drummer Ian Wallace. Referring to his drum part in "Sailor's Tale", Wallace writes, "I really like what I'm doing, so much so that I might have to steal it back from myself!"

== Track listing ==
=== Disc 1 ===
1. "Cirkus" (Fripp, Sinfield) – 10:08
2. "Pictures of a City" (Fripp, Sinfield) – 8:53
3. "Sailor's Tale" (Fripp) – 15:32
4. "The Letters" (Fripp, Sinfield) – 4:48
5. "Lady of the Dancing Water" – (Fripp, Sinfield) 2:52
6. "Cadence and Cascade" – (Fripp, Sinfield) 4:24

=== Disc 2 ===
1. "Get Thy Bearings" (Donovan) – 13:24
2. "The Court of the Crimson King" (McDonald, Sinfield) – 8:09
3. "Ladies of the Road" – (Fripp, Sinfield) 9:05
4. "21st Century Schizoid Man" (Fripp, McDonald, Lake, Giles, Sinfield) – 8:58
5. "The Devil's Triangle" (Fripp, McDonald) – 9:12

== Personnel ==
King Crimson

- Robert Fripp – electric guitar, Mellotron, Hohner Pianet
- Mel Collins – saxophone, flute, Mellotron
- Boz Burrell – bass guitar, lead vocals
- Ian Wallace – drums, percussion, backing vocals
- Peter Sinfield – live sound mixing, VCS3, stage lighting

Production personnel

- Alex R. Mundy – digital editing
- David Singleton – mastering
- Robert Ellis – photography
- Hugh O'Donnell – design
