= Live in Mainz =

Live album by King Crimson
- Released: February 2001
- Recorded: March 30, 1974
- Venue: Eltzer Hof, Mainz, West Germany
- Genre: Progressive rock
- Length: 58:11
- Label: Discipline Global Mobile
- Producer: David Singleton and Alex R. Mundy

King Crimson Collector's Club chronology
Live at Plymouth Guildhall (2000)	Live in Mainz (2001)	Live in Berkeley, CA (2001)

Professional ratings
Review scores
Source	Rating
AllMusic	4.5/5 stars

Live in Mainz is a live album by the band King Crimson, released through the King Crimson Collector's Club in March 2001. The album was recorded at Eltzer Hof, Mainz, West Germany, on March 30, 1974.

Like other concerts from the European tour of early 1974, this show was recorded directly from the soundboard. Four tracks ("The Savage", "Arabica", "Atria" and "Trio") were improvisations.

The album includes liner notes written by the band's bass player, John Wetton.

== Track listing ==
1. "Improv: The Savage" (Cross, Fripp, Wetton, Bruford) – 2:12
2. "Doctor Diamond" (Cross, Fripp, Wetton, Bruford, Palmer-James) – 5:48
3. "Improv: Arabica" (Cross, Fripp, Wetton, Bruford) – 2:29
4. "Exiles" (Cross, Fripp, Palmer-James) – 7:01
5. "Improv: Atria" (Cross, Fripp, Wetton, Bruford) – 6:14
6. "The Night Watch" (Fripp, Wetton, Palmer-James) – 5:07
7. "Starless" (Cross, Fripp, Wetton, Bruford, Palmer-James) – 12:27
8. "Lament" (Fripp, Wetton, Palmer-James) – 4:20
9. "Improv: Trio" (Cross, Fripp, Wetton, Bruford) – 4:36
10. "Easy Money" (Fripp, Wetton, Palmer-James) – 7:51

== Personnel ==
King Crimson

- David Cross – violin, Mellotron, Hohner Pianet
- Robert Fripp – guitar, Mellotron, Hohner Painet
- John Wetton – bass guitar, vocals
- Bill Bruford – drums, percussion

Production personnel

- Alex R. Mundy – digital editing
- David Singleton – mastering
- Hugh O'Donnell – design
