= Live in Berkeley, CA =

Live album by King Crimson
- Released: May 2001
- Recorded: August 13, 1982
- Venues: Greek Theatre, Berkeley, California, United States
- Genres: Progressive rock, new wave
- Label: Discipline Global Mobile
- Producers: David Singleton and Alex R. Mundy

King Crimson Collector's Club chronology
Live in Mainz (2001)	Live in Berkeley, CA (2001)	Live in Northampton, MA (2001)

Professional ratings
Review scores
Source	Rating
Allmusic	4/5 stars

Live in Berkeley, CA is a live album by the band King Crimson, recorded at the Greek Theatre, Berkeley, California on 13 August 1982. It was released through the King Crimson Collector's Club in May 2001.

The album includes liner notes by guitarist Robert Fripp's sister Patricia, who attended the concert.

== Track listing ==
All songs written by Belew, Fripp, Levin, Bruford, except "Red", written by Fripp; all lyrics by Belew.

1. "Waiting Man" – 9:25
2. "Thela Hun Ginjeet" – 7:41
3. "Red" – 6:16
4. "The Howler" – 4:58
5. "Frame by Frame" – 4:57
6. "Matte Kudasai" (待ってください, "Please Wait for Me") – 3:30
7. "The Sheltering Sky" – 9:10
8. "Discipline" – 5:28
9. "Neal and Jack and Me" – 5:48
10. "Neurotica" – 5:34
11. "Elephant Talk" – 5:22
12. "Indiscipline" – 10:42

== Personnel ==
King Crimson

- Adrian Belew – electric guitar, lead vocals
- Robert Fripp – electric guitar
- Tony Levin – bass guitar, Chapman Stick, backing vocals
- Bill Bruford – drums, percussion

Production personnel

- Alex R. Mundy – digital editing
- David Singleton – mastering
- Tony Levin – photography
- Hugh O'Donnell – design
