= Live in Hyde Park (King Crimson album) =

Live in Hyde Park, London

Live album by King Crimson
- Released: September 2000
- Recorded: July 5, 1969; June 12, 1969; 15 March 1997
- Venue: Hyde Park, London
- Genre: Progressive rock
- Length: 39:55 (live performance); 62:02 (entire album)
- Label: Discipline Global Mobile
- Producers: Robert Fripp and David Singleton

King Crimson Collector's Club chronology
Live at Moles Club, Bath (2000)	Live in Hyde Park, London (2000)	Nashville Rehearsals (2000)

Professional ratings
Review scores
Source	Rating
Allmusic	4/5 stars

Live in Hyde Park is a live album by the band King Crimson derived from a low-quality audience bootleg and released through the King Crimson Collector's Club in September 2000.

The album documents King Crimson's performance at the Hyde Park Festival of July 5, 1969, held in London, England. It has been estimated that half a million people attended this outdoor concert, which was headlined by the Rolling Stones. King Crimson were the opening act. Their setlist was cut for the occasion, and the last track, Mars, was much shorter than usual. Nonetheless, the consensus was that their performance was a success, which significantly increased the band's reputation.

The CD also includes two bonus tracks. The first is a series of excerpts from a press conference, held by all five members of the original King Crimson along with the band's road management. This conference was recorded at the release of King Crimson's Epitaph box set, featuring four CDs of concert material by the original band. The conference was held at the InterContinental London hotel on March 15, 1997.

The second bonus track is an instrumental recording of "21st Century Schizoid Man", recorded at Morgan Studios in London on June 12, 1969. Guitarist Robert Fripp has acknowledged that his solo on this version is "dismal in extremis", though noting that it was intended only as a guide track (and was subsequently replaced by a "proper" solo).

The album was originally scheduled to be released in August 2000, but was held up by a dispute between members of the 1969 line-up of King Crimson. The liner notes include comments from Fripp, Ian McDonald, Michael Giles, Peter Sinfield and manager David Enthoven.

== Track listing ==
All tracks written by Robert Fripp, Ian McDonald, Greg Lake, Michael Giles and Peter Sinfield, unless otherwise indicated.

No.	Title	Length
1.	"21st Century Schizoid Man"	6:35
2.	"The Court of the Crimson King" (McDonald, Sinfield)	6:31
3.	"Get Thy Bearings" (Donovan, arr. by Fripp, McDonald, Lake, Giles)	9:41
4.	"Epitaph"	4:28
5.	"Mantra"	3:04
6.	"Travel Weary Capricorn"	5:37
7.	"Mars: The Bringer of War" (Gustav Holst, arr. Fripp, McDonald, Lake, Giles)	3:59
8.	"Band reunion meeting" (Recorded on March 15, 1997 at InterContinental London hotel)	15:19
9.	"21st Century Schizoid Man" (Instrumental version)	6:48

== Personnel ==
King Crimson

- Robert Fripp – electric guitar
- Ian McDonald – alto saxophone, flute, Mellotron, vocals
- Greg Lake – bass guitar, lead vocals
- Michael Giles – drums, percussion, vocals
- Peter Sinfield – lyrics, live sound mixing, illumination

Production personnel

- Alex R. Mundy – digital editing
- David Singleton – mastering
- Hugh O'Donnell – design
