= Live in Mexico City (King Crimson album) =

Live album by King Crimson
- Released: 1999
- Recorded: 2–4 August 1996
- Venue: Teatro Metropólitan, Mexico City, Mexico
- Genre: Progressive rock
- Label: Discipline Global Mobile
- Producer: Robert Fripp and David Singleton

King Crimson chronology
Cirkus: The Young Persons' Guide to King Crimson Live (1999)	Live in Mexico City (1999)	The ProjeKcts (1999)

Live in Mexico City is a live album by the English progressive rock band King Crimson which was first released as a free Windows Media Audio download in 1999. Some tracks later appeared on the live albums Cirkus: The Young Persons' Guide to King Crimson Live (1999) and Vrooom Vrooom (2001), and as part of the expanded THRAK box in 2015. The album was recorded at the Teatro Metropólitan, Mexico City, Mexico, 2–4 August 1996

== Track listing ==
1. "Dinosaur" (Belew, Fripp, Gunn, Levin, Bruford, Mastelotto)
2. "One Time" (Belew, Fripp, Gunn, Levin, Bruford, Mastelotto)
3. "VROOOM VROOOM" (Belew, Fripp, Gunn, Levin, Bruford, Mastelotto)
4. "B’Boom" (Belew, Fripp, Gunn, Levin, Bruford, Mastelotto)
5. "THRAK" (Belew, Fripp, Gunn, Levin, Bruford, Mastelotto)
6. "Sex Sleep Eat Drink Dream" (Belew, Fripp, Gunn, Levin, Bruford, Mastelotto)
7. "The Talking Drum" (Cross, Fripp, Wetton, Bruford, Muir)
8. "Larks’ Tongues in Aspic (Part II)" (Fripp)
9. "Neurotica" (Belew, Fripp, Levin, Bruford)
10. "21st Century Schizoid Man" (Fripp, McDonald, Lake, Giles, Sinfield)
11. "Prism" (Favre)
12. "Red" (Fripp)

== Personnel ==
King Crimson

- Adrian Belew – guitar, vocals
- Robert Fripp – guitar
- Trey Gunn – Warr guitar
- Tony Levin – bass guitar, electric upright bass, Chapman Stick, backing vocals
- Bill Bruford – drums, percussion
- Pat Mastelotto – drums, percussion

Production personnel

- Ronan Chris Murphy – mixing
- David Singleton – mastering
