= Eltzer Hof =

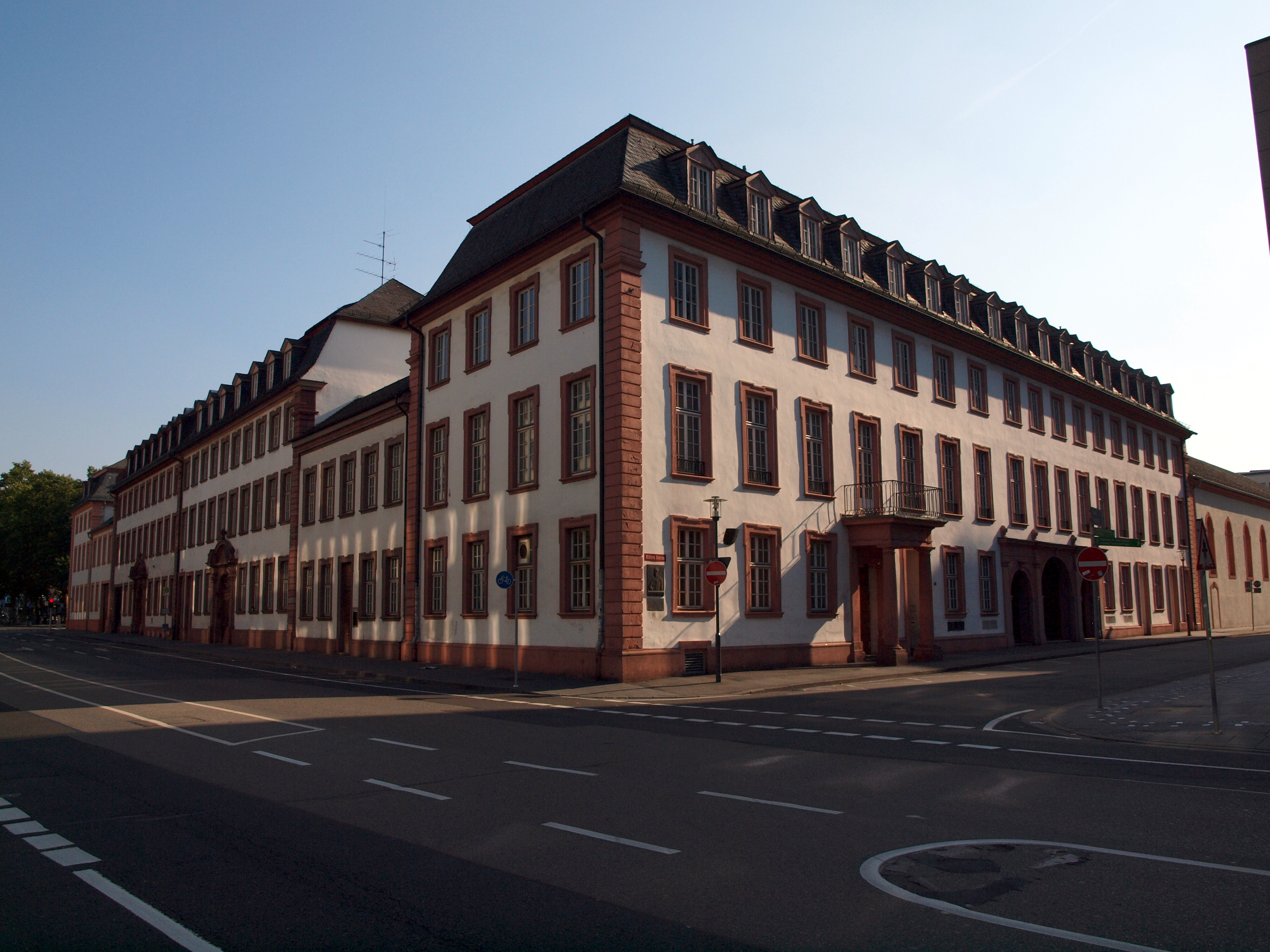
Eltzer Hof

Eltzer Hof was a music venue located in Mainz, Germany. The building was constructed in 1742 in a Baroque style architecture on behalf of the Eltz dynasty. During the Bombing of Mainz in World War II the building burnt down starting 11 August 1942. The three-storey eighteen-axle baroque building with a hipped mansard roof, at Bauhofstraße 3/5 corner Mittlere Bleiche, is listed in the list of cultural monuments in Mainz-Altstadt and together with the adjacent buildings forms a monument zone.

== History ==
The Eltzer Hof mansion was built 1742 in the Bleichenviertel (bleaching quarter) and shows a simplicity that is rather rare for that time. The parts of the building are divided by rusticated pilaster strips, covered with a mansard hipped roof and decorated only by two baroque portals. Almost 24 years later, the Golden Ross Barracks were built in the immediate vicinity between 1766 and 1767. In 1774 the Counts of Eltz took over the Dalberg-Hammelburger Hof mansion and merged it with the neighbouring Eltzer Hof, since then the Eltzer yards have also been mentioned. In August 1792 Minister Johann Wolfgang von Goethe visited the Prussian statesman Heinrich Friedrich Karl vom und zum Stein, residing there.

Between 1965 and 1970, the yards were rebuilt comprising a concert hall for the Mainzer Liedertafel and used as an event venue for the Mainz carnival, among other things. During renovation work on the hall in 2004, asbestos contamination was discovered, since then the former concert hall was not in operation. In 2008, the Ministry of Finance of Rhineland-Palatinate announced an architectural competition for a "multifunctional event venue". The plans of the Kassel-based firm Atelier 30 Architekten, which won the award in 2009, were not implemented due to the high costs of almost 22 million euros. In March 2015 it became known that the state intends to sell the property in the Mainz government district to an investor who is to create apartments as well as office and retail space there. A study also suggests a cultural use. Starting in 2018, the ensemble was renovated according to plans by Wiesbaden architects Willen Associates. The aristocratic palace was partially demolished and gutted, with only the façades being preserved. For this purpose, a breach was made in the façade itself to technically facilitate the demolition. In August 2024, the renovated property was presented to the media.
