= Music for Civic Recovery Centre =

Studio album by Brian Eno
- Released: 2000
- Recorded: 2000
- Genre: Ambient, dark ambient
- Length: 44:50
- Label: Opal
- Producer: Brian Eno

Brian Eno chronology
Music for Onmyo-Ji (2000)	Music for Civic Recovery Centre (2000)	Compact Forest Proposal (2001)

Professional ratings
Review scores
Source	Rating
Allmusic	2.5/5 stars

Music for Civic Recovery Centre is the nineteenth solo studio album by Brian Eno, released in 2000. Part of Eno's Quiet Club series of Installations, is Eno's third release that has a sole composition (the previous releases being Thursday Afternoon and Neroli).

The music on the album is taken from an Installation—a show featuring music and visuals—that took place at the Sonic Boom exhibition of the Hayward Gallery, London, from April–June 2000. The event, featuring over 30 other artists, was curated by David Toop. Music for Civic Recovery Centre combined 12 audio elements with 10 visual light-sculpture generative elements, which was, itself, part of a series of multi-dimensional generative music pieces using asynchronous CD players, carousel projectors and video monitors used in other Installation pieces.

== Overview ==
An Opal release, with no catalogue number, this title is only available from EnoShop.

In a conversation with David Toop, Eno's view is of a quiet "recovery area" situated within a city area, a theory which he has spoken of since the mid-eighties; a "critically functioning public space", a (preferably) darkened room containing large-format screens, and many CD players and sculptures.

Eno has said of his Installations "I want to make places that feel like music. I want to make things which are like music for the eyes. I want to extend music out into space, into the three dimensions of space, and into colour".

The album contains only one track, which is based upon, and essentially an extended remix / melding of the tracks Ikebukuro, from his 1992 album The Shutov Assembly and Kites II & Kites III from his 1999 album Kite Stories.

The heavily treated, slowed-down vocals of the Kite Stories part are based on a Japanese ghost-story, Onmyo-Ji, by Reiko Otano and was read by Kyoko Inatome, a waitress from his favorite sushi restaurant.

Eno calls this process "composting" .... "...so many processings and reprocessings - it's a bit like making soup from the leftovers of the day before, which in turn was made from leftovers...", "some earlier pieces I worked on became digested by later ones, which in turn became digested again. The technique is like composting: converting what would otherwise have been waste into nourishment".

In that same year, 2000, Eno issued a limited-edition 2-CD album with Reiko Okano, Baku Yumemakura & Peter Schwalm called Music for Onmyo-Ji, the first CD of which consists of Japanese music played on traditional instruments.

== Track listing ==
1. The Quiet Club - 44:50

== Credits ==
- Music: Brian Eno
- Main Voice: Kyoko Inatome
- Translation: Charmian Norman-Taylor

A "Quiet Club by Brian Eno" Installation was held in the Galleria of Frankfurt Fair and Exhibition Centre, 18 to 24 April 2004, as the contribution of Light+Building 2004 to Luminale. The music was remixed each time by a different musician.
