= ForeverAndEverNoMore =

Studio album by Brian Eno
- Released: 14 October 2022
- Genre: Ambient pop
- Length: 44:54
- Label: Opal; UMC
- Producer: Brian Eno

Brian Eno chronology
Mixing Colours (2020)	ForeverAndEverNoMore (2022)	Secret Life (2023)

Singles from ForeverAndEverNoMore
- 1. "There Were Bells" Released: 28 July 2022

ForeverAndEverNoMore is the twenty-eighth studio album by Brian Eno, released on 14 October 2022 through Opal Music and UMC. It was preceded by the lead single "There Were Bells", and received acclaim from critics. The album reached the top 40 on the UK Albums Chart.

The album was reissued in April 2023 with a bonus disc of instrumental versions of the album's tracks, titled Forever Voiceless.

== Background ==
The album was announced as Eno's first vocal-based album since Another Day on Earth (2005) (although The Ship (2016) also prominently featured vocals), and regards his "concerns about the future from both an environmental and geopolitical standpoint", with particular focus on the climate crisis and "the prospect of humankind's demise". An ambient pop album, it mostly features Eno on instrumentation.

== Critical reception ==
Professional ratings
Aggregate scores
Source	Rating
AnyDecentMusic?	7.3/10
Metacritic	81/100
Review scores
Source	Rating
AllMusic	3.5/5 stars
Clash	8/10
Classic Rock	4/5 stars
The Guardian	4/5 stars
MusicOMH	4/5 stars
Mojo	4/5 stars
NME	3/5 stars
Pitchfork	7.5/10
Slant Magazine	3.5/5 stars
Uncut	4.5/5 stars

ForeverAndEverNoMore received a score of 81 out of 100 based on 17 critics' reviews at review aggregator Metacritic, indicating "universal acclaim". Tal Rosenberg of Pitchfork felt that "the singing isn't straightforwardly melodic; it's just one more textural layer in smoothly reverberating sound design that's full of arcing synth notes, periodic pings and chimes, and shimmering background tones. There's no percussion, no major chords, and no choruses or bridges." Rosenberg remarked that as "glossily stark as the album might be, the music isn't entirely grim", and, noting Eno's niece appearing as a vocalist and his granddaughter's handwriting being used in the video for "Let It In", summarised it as "an album about something vast and daunting, made with and for the people closest to you".

Sophie Harris of The Guardian noted that "these are songs rather than ambient pieces, and Eno's voice is deeper now and more commanding, even as it ripples with anger, regret – flashing like a chameleon's skin in flux". NME's Patrick Clarke found that ForeverAndEverNoMore "doesn't offer any solutions to humanity's existential threats, but it does offer hope for the future", as it is "never quite an album that is completely comforting or despairing" that utilises "introspection as a means of finding stability in the chaos". James Mellen of Clash called it "a record generated from, in its purest form, feelings", with a "steady balance of electronica and organic sounds; Baroque motifs are scattered throughout, along with almost hymn-style vocal work". Mellen concluded that it is simultaneously "nostalgic, melancholic, hopeful and hopeless, existentialist and nihilist".

Reviewing the album for Slant Magazine, Paul Attard opined that while its "intentions are certainly noble, and its overall assessment of the state of things is, sadly, on point, the album is hampered by Eno's overly didactic messaging", writing that at times, "the songwriting feels counterintuitive to Eno's elegant musicianship".

For the album's Forever Voiceless edition, Christopher J. Lee of PopMatters called the absence of Eno's voice "something of an improvement" as they "ruin the ambiance" and, despite his good intentions, they have a "plangent quality that, against his signature backdrop of electronic instrumentation, assumes a God-like quality, as if Eno is a New Age shaman dispensing prophecies and other divine insights".

== Track listing ==
ForeverAndEverNoMore track listing
No.	Title	Length
1.	"Who Gives a Thought"	3:59
2.	"We Let It In"	3:28
3.	"Icarus or Blériot"	4:23
4.	"Garden of Stars"	4:19
5.	"Inclusion"	4:55
6.	"There Were Bells"	4:52
7.	"Sherry"	3:25
8.	"I'm Hardly Me"	3:50
9.	"These Small Noises"	3:22
10.	"Making Gardens Out of Silence"	8:21
Total length:		44:54

Forever Voiceless track listing
No.	Title	Length
1.	"A Thought"	3:59
2.	"And Let It In"	3:28
3.	"Who Are We"	4:23
4.	"Crystal Light"	4:18
5.	"Inclusion"	4:56
6.	"Bells Above"	4:51
7.	"Chéri"	3:25
8.	"Hardly Me"	3:50
9.	"Small Noise"	3:22
10.	"Silence"	8:21
Total length:		44:53

== Charts ==
Chart performance for ForeverAndEverNoMore
Chart (2022)	Peak position
Belgian Albums (Ultratop Flanders)	78
German Albums (Offizielle Top 100)	83
Scottish Albums (OCC)	7
Swiss Albums (Schweizer Hitparade)	57
UK Albums (OCC)	32
US Top Album Sales (Billboard)	33
US New Age Albums (Billboard)	1
