= I Dormienti =

Studio album by Brian Eno
- Released: 1999
- Recorded: 1999
- Genre: Ambient
- Length: 39:40
- Label: Opal
- Producer: Brian Eno

Brian Eno chronology
Lightness: Music for the Marble Palace (1998)	I Dormienti (1999)	Kite Stories (1999)

Professional ratings
Review scores
Source	Rating
AllMusic	4/5 stars

I Dormienti is the seventeenth solo studio album Brian Eno, released in 1999. It is also the title of an art-book by Eno and Italian painter, sculptor and set designer Mimmo Paladino, released in 2000, packaged with a copy of the album and featuring pictures & sketches of the installation from which the music is drawn. The music on the album is taken from an installation that took place at the undercroft of the Roundhouse, Chalk Farm Road, Camden, London, from 9 September to 6 October 1999.

The event featured the works of Eno and Paladino, who became established in the early 1980s as one of the main exponents of the so-called Transavanguardia, a form of neo-expressionism and lyrical abstraction. This was the second of his exhibitions; the first did not feature Eno's collaboration.

== Overview ==
An Opal release, with no catalogue number, this title is only currently available from EnoShop.

The exhibition was in the form of drawings and terracota sculptures – about 30 reclining figures with about 20 attendant crocodiles he called I Dormienti, "The Sleepers". The publicity notice said of it, "in the centre of a labyrinth of tunnels", Paladino created "an installation of primordial life forms" that were accompanied by Eno's "unique sound and light production". In actuality, Eno had nothing to do with the lighting; illumination was provided by the venue's dim emergency lights, which imparted a pallor to the sculptures and drawings.

The music came from well-concealed speakers and consisted mainly of a three-note Neroli-esque sequence, and electronic noise. In his recent installations at Bonn and Amsterdam, stories spoken very slowly, one or two words at a time, were used in the performance, and here the method was developed further with treated, sampled voices speaking in syllables – an idea which would be used in his next album, Kite Stories.

The material condensed onto the album in a single track consists of ten or so layers of the aforementioned syllables, speech excerpts, the standard Eno treated piano, and various drones and echoes.

== The book ==
The book was edited by Demetrio Paparoni and published by Alberico Cetti Serbelloni Editore of Milan, in 2000, ISBN 88-88098-00-3. Two editions were printed:

- A presentation-boxed luxury edition of a print-run of 2000.
- A 100-copy special edition accompanied by an aquatint etching with drypoint and presented in a fired terracotta case, both designed by Paladino.

It features a five-colour "pentachrome" printing-process, 250 gram card stock, silk screen printed cloth cover, protective sleeve, monochrome and colour photographs by Peppe Avallone of the Roundhouse exhibition, sketches by Paladino and Eno, a dialogue between the two artists, and the text is in Italian and English. 108 pages, 12 1/4 × 12 1/4 inches.

The CD is also included, with a different label from the album.

== Track listing ==
All tracks are written by Brian Eno.

No.	Title	Length
1.	"I Dormienti"	39:40
Total length:		39:40
