= Reflection (Brian Eno album) =

Studio album by Brian Eno
- Released: 1 January 2017
- Genre: Ambient
- Length: ∞ (iOS app); 54:00 (all other media)
- Label: Warp
- Producer: Brian Eno

Brian Eno chronology
The Ship (2016)	Reflection (2017)	Mixing Colours (2020)

Reflection is the twenty-seventh studio album by Brian Eno, released on 1 January 2017 on Warp Records. It is a piece of generative ambient music produced by Eno, which plays indefinitely via an app, modulating its output at different times of the day. A pre-recorded version of the album is available on CD and vinyl, which runs for 54 minutes. Digital streaming versions of the album update on a seasonal basis. It was nominated for the 2017 Grammy Award for Best New Age Album and was released to a positive acclaim by critics.

== Background ==
Reflection was released as part of Eno's series of ambient albums. Its structure is similar to that of Thursday Afternoon (1985), an earlier album of his that consists of a single track that runs for 60 minutes in length. Reflection has a length of 54 minutes. Eno decided on its title as the piece "makes [him] think back. It makes me think things over. It seems to create a psychological space that encourages internal conversation. And external ones actually—people seem to enjoy it as the background to their conversations". He considers the work the most sophisticated of all his ambient releases, and that the physical editions are a mere static excerpt of the "full" piece contained in the iOS app.

== Release ==
On 1 January 2017, an album listening event was held at several Rough Trade shops worldwide. During the event, an edition of Reflection limited to 500 copies was available on CD, where each disc contained a "uniquely generated, one-of-a-kind" version of the piece inside of an autographed case sleeve.

Subsequently, 1 April, 1 July, and 9 October saw Eno release a new excerpt of the generative piece to streaming services Apple Music and Spotify, with varying lengths (the "autumn" iteration being 65:24 in length.) Each of these seasonal excerpts took the place of the previous version to represent the album. The generative iOS app also received updates on these same days.

== Critical reception ==
Professional ratings
Aggregate scores
Source	Rating
AnyDecentMusic?	7.3/10
Metacritic	75/100
Review scores
Source	Rating
AllMusic	3.5/5 stars
The A.V. Club	B
Consequence of Sound	B
Drowned in Sound	9/10
Financial Times	4/5 stars
The Guardian	3/5 stars
The Line of Best Fit	9/10
Pitchfork	7.7/10
Slant Magazine	3.5/5 stars
Uncut	4/5 stars

Upon release, Reflection received positive reviews from critics. Writing for The Guardian, Kitty Empire wrote, "The overall effect is deeply, magnificently peaceful, meditative, even; ambient certainly monopolises certain sections of the thesaurus."

== Track listing ==
Written, recorded, and produced by Brian Eno.

CD, vinyl and original digital purchase editions
No.	Title	Length
1.	"Reflection"	54:00

Current digital streaming edition
No.	Title	Length
1.	"Reflection"	65:24

== Personnel ==
Credits are adapted from the album's liner notes.

- Brian Eno – writer, performer, producer

Additional personnel

- Peter Chilvers – mutation software

Production

- Matt Colton – mastering at Alchemy Studios
- Brian Eno – cover image, photography
- Nick Robertson – layout, design

== Charts ==
Chart (2017)	Peak position
Belgian Albums (Ultratop Flanders)	46
Belgian Albums (Ultratop Wallonia)	153
Dutch Albums (Album Top 100)	92
Japanese Albums (Oricon)	107
New Zealand Heatseekers Albums (RMNZ)	7
Scottish Albums (OCC)	60
Swiss Albums (Schweizer Hitparade)	97
UK Albums (OCC)	78
UK Independent Albums (OCC)	9
US Independent Albums (Billboard)	17
US Top Dance Albums (Billboard)	2
