= Compact Forest Proposal =

Studio album by Brian Eno
- Released: February 2001
- Recorded: 2001
- Genre: Ambient; dark ambient
- Length: 48:00
- Label: Opal
- Producer: Brian Eno

Brian Eno chronology
Music for Civic Recovery Centre (2000)	Compact Forest Proposal (2001)	Drawn from Life (2001)

Compact Forest Proposal (subtitled: 5 Studies for "010101", San Francisco Museum of Modern Art, 2001) is the twentieth solo studio album from Brian Eno, released in February 2001.

The music on the album was made for an installation—a show featuring music and visuals—that took place at the San Francisco Museum of Modern Art's "010101: Art in Technological Times" exhibition which opened on 3 March 2001. His piece was titled New Urban Spaces Series #4: "Compact Forest Proposal". Since then, the museum has acquired the Installation for its permanent collection.

== Overview ==
An Opal release, with no catalogue number, this title is only available from EnoShop.

The piece was installed in a dark room, featuring strings of tiny white lights rising to the ceiling from gossamer pods that reminded Eno of "jellyfish", while his music played. "It's an idea for a kind of retreat people can go to in the city". Part of Eno's Quiet Club series of Installations, he described it as a sort of "simulated forest" of the future. He gave it a "deliberately clunky" title "because I want it to be like an architectural submission for a new space."

The CD notes explain

"There are 10 active CD players in this installation. Each is playing a specially cut CD, a single layer of the total music. The CDs have different numbers of tracks, some of which are silent, and each player is set to play these tracks in random order. The final music is therefore an ever-changing combination, unlikely to exactly repeat itself in any individual user's experience".

"The studies on the CD represent possible conditions of the installation piece (i.e. conditions that it might randomise itself into sometime during the several months that it will play), although there are some elements in the studies that were not finally used in the installation itself".

"My other installation pieces to date have been relatively "steady state" in that they've remained faithful to a specific harmonic palette. In this piece, however, one of the 10 playing CDs carries two quite different harmonic sub-strata. Since these are different tracks on the same single CD, they are never heard together, but alternate with each other. The other elements of the piece float over these backdrops: it's as though the weather changes".

The music can be seen as a "sequel" to his Music for Civic Recovery Centre album (2000) as it continues to explore variations on the same tracks that were featured there, ie Ikebukuro, from his 1992 album The Shutov Assembly and Kites II & Kites III from his 1999 album Kite Stories; this is particularly true on the longest piece. Two different "backdrop" tracks change the mood of the album from its "prequel".

== Track listing ==
1. Compact Forest Proposal, Condition 5 - 6:09
2. Compact Forest Proposal, Condition 3 - 5:54
3. Compact Forest Proposal, Condition 4 - 20:04
4. Compact Forest Proposal, Condition 8 - 5:44
5. Compact Forest Proposal, Condition 7 - 10:02

== Credits ==
Music and cover art: Brian Eno

== Inspirations ==
A segment of the album was featured on Fabric 11 (Radio Mix) - Swayzak 3. Birdstance, an album by Bangsplat, was inspired by the album 4, 5.
