= Brian Eno =

English musician and producer (born 1948)

Brian Eno RDI
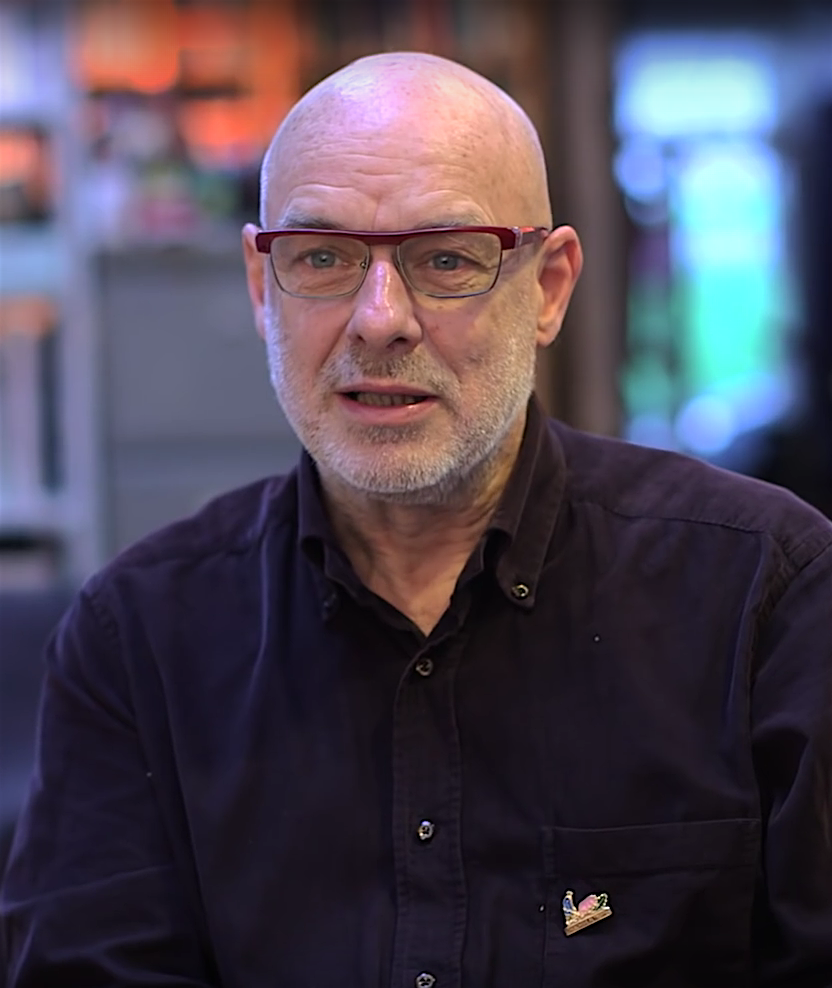
- Eno in 2015
- Born: Brian Peter George Eno; 15 May 1948 (age 78); Melton, Suffolk, England
- Other names: A.N. Bonier; Ben Arion; Ben O'Rian; Brian Peter George St. Jean-Baptiste de la Salle Eno; CSJ Bofop; Eno; Ibn'Aroen; Nick Kool and the Koolaids; Nina Bore; Sweetdome
- Education: Winchester School of Art (DFA)
- Occupations: Musician; songwriter; record producer; visual artist; sound designer; author; political activist
- Years active: 1969–present
- Organization: Long Now Foundation
- Spouses: Sarah Grenville (m. 1967, divorced) Anthea Norman-Taylor (m. 1988)
- Children: 3
- Relatives: Roger Eno (brother)
- Musical career
- Genres: Ambient; electronic; minimalism; pop; rock
- Instruments: Keyboards; synthesisers; vocals
- Works: Discography
- Labels: Island; Polydor; E.G.; Obscure; Opal; Virgin; Astralwerks; All Saints; Rykodisc; Warner Bros.; Warp
- Formerly of: Scratch Orchestra; Portsmouth Sinfonia; Roxy Music; Fripp & Eno; 801; Harmonia 76; Passengers; Fovea Hex; No More Landmine; Africa Express; Together for Palestine
- Website: brian-eno.net

Brian Eno (/ˈiːnoʊ/ EE-no; born Brian Peter George Eno, 15 May 1948) is an English musician, record producer and artist. He is known for his pioneering contributions to ambient, electronic and generative music, and for producing, recording, and writing works in rock and pop music. He describes himself as a "non-musician" uninterested in virtuosity, and advocates for using the studio as a compositional tool. He has been described as one of popular music's most influential and innovative figures.

Eno was born in Melton, Suffolk, and studied at Ipswich School of Art and the Winchester School of Art. He joined the glam rock band Roxy Music in 1971, contributing to their first two albums, and left in 1973. In 1974, Eno released his first solo albums, Here Come the Warm Jets and Taking Tiger Mountain (By Strategy). His third, Another Green World (1975), combined rock with minimal instrumental tracks. Eno coined the term "ambient music" to describe music he conceived to be "as ignorable as possible", and released a string of albums in the genre, including Discreet Music (1975) and Ambient 1: Music for Airports (1979).

Eno's profile rose when he contributed to the David Bowie albums Low (1977), Heroes (1977) and Lodger (1979), known as the Berlin Trilogy, and produced the Talking Heads albums More Songs About Buildings and Food (1978), Fear of Music (1979) and Remain in Light (1980). With Daniel Lanois, Eno produced the U2 albums The Unforgettable Fire (1984), The Joshua Tree (1987) — one of the highest-selling albums in history — and Achtung Baby (1991). Eno produced Coldplay's album Viva la Vida or Death and All His Friends, the highest-selling album of 2008, and co-wrote their next album, Mylo Xyloto (2011). He has also produced albums by Ultravox, Devo, Harold Budd, Laraaji, James, Laurie Anderson and Paul Simon, and released music with artists including 801, Robert Fripp, David Byrne, Jon Hassell, Cluster, Roger Eno, John Cale, Karl Hyde, Jon Hopkins, Kevin Shields, Tom Rogerson and Fred Again. Eno composed the startup music for Windows 95 and has scored films including The Lovely Bones (2009). His visual art includes 77 Million Paintings, a generative art installation first exhibited in 2006.

Rolling Stone's 2023 list of the 500 greatest albums includes Here Come the Warm Jets and Another Green World, plus albums Eno created with Roxy Music, Bowie, Devo, Talking Heads and U2. In 2019, Eno was inducted into the Rock and Roll Hall of Fame as a member of Roxy Music. He is an activist on behalf of humanitarian, environmental, anti-war and pro-Palestinian causes and is a founding member of the Long Now Foundation.

== Early life ==
Brian Peter George Eno was born on 15 May 1948 in the village of Melton, Suffolk, and grew up in the nearby town of Woodbridge. His parents were William Arnold Eno, a postal worker and clock and watch repairer, and Maria Alphonsine (née Buslot), a Belgian national. His grandfather played the saxophone and bassoon and built and repaired pianos and church organs. Eno has a younger brother, the musician Roger Eno, and a younger sister, Arlette. They have a half-sister, Rita, from their mother's previous relationship. The surname Eno derives from the Huguenot surname Hennot.

Eno was raised Catholic. In 1959, he began attending St Joseph's College, Ipswich, a Catholic grammar school of the De La Salle Brothers order. His confirmation name, Brian Peter George St. Jean-Baptiste de la Salle Eno, is taken from Jean-Baptiste de La Salle. There was a large American population due to the nearby US airbases RAF Bentwaters and RAF Woodbridge, through which Eno was exposed to American R&B, blues and doo-wop artists such Don and Juan and the Silhouettes. He was also inspired by the Dutch painter Piet Mondrian, whom he discovered while staying with his uncle, an art collector. At school, Eno used a tape recorder as a musical instrument. In 1964 he formed his first group, the Black Aces, with friends he met at a Melton youth club, with Eno on drums.

By 1964, after earning four O-levels, including in art and mathematics, Eno had developed an interest in art and music and had no interest in a conventional job. He enrolled at the Ipswich School of Art, taking the newly established Groundcourse foundation art degree established by the new media artist Roy Ascott. One of Eno's teachers was the artist Tom Phillips, who became a lifelong friend and encouraged his musical ability. Phillips recalled the pair stripping pianos, aligning them in a hall and striking them with tennis balls.

At the Winchester School of Art, Eno attended a lecture by the Who guitarist Pete Townshend, another former student of Ascott. He cited this as the moment when he realised he could make music without formal training. In late 1967, Eno formed the Merchant Taylor's Simultaneous Cabinet, an avant-garde performance trio with Winchester undergraduates. This was followed by short stints in avant-garde and college groups, including the Maxwell Demon and Dandelion and the War Damage, with Eno as frontman who adopted a theatrical persona on stage and played the guitar. In 1968, Eno published an essay titled "Music for non-musicians", in which he argued for systems as a means to create music. Eno graduated in 1969 with a diploma in Fine Arts.

== Career ==
=== Early work and Roxy Music (1969—1971) ===
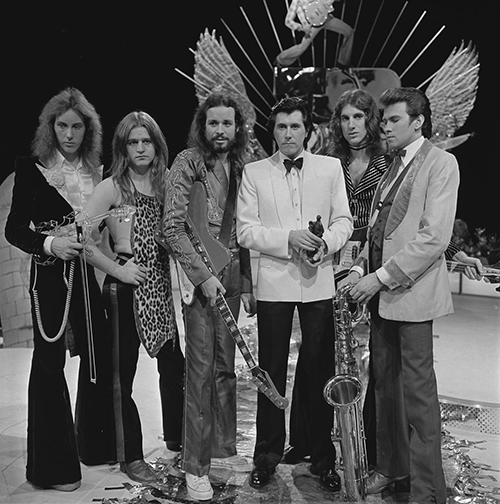
Eno rose to fame as a member of Roxy Music (pictured without Eno in 1974) and performed on their first two albums.

In 1969, after separating from his wife, Eno moved to London. He worked initially as Phillips' painting assistant. Eno's first appearance on a commercially released recording is the Deutsche Grammophon edition of The Great Learning (1971) by Cornelius Cardew and the Scratch Orchestra, which features Eno as one of the voices on the track "Paragraph 7". He also composed the soundtrack to Berlin Horse (1970), a nine-minute experimental film by Malcolm Le Grice. For three months, Eno worked as paste-up assistant for the advertisement section of a local paper. Finding it uncreative, he quit and became an electronics dealer, making cabinets for old speakers and selling them to friends.

Between 1970 and 1974, Eno played clarinet with the Portsmouth Sinfonia, an orchestra founded by Gavin Bryars that accepted players of any skill, and produced their first two albums. Eno said the mixture of skilled and unskilled players "was like a very blurry version, a soft-focus version, of classical music, and it produced some beautiful music ... There were some exquisite moments — the mixture of chance and choice."

In 1971, Eno joined the glam rock band Roxy Music following a chance meeting with the saxophonist, Andy Mackay. Eno said later: "If I'd walked ten yards further on the platform, or missed that train, or been in the next carriage, I probably would have been an art teacher now." GQ said this began "for Eno a decade so productive it arguably ranks with the '60s heydays of the Beatles, Hendrix or Dylan". Roxy Music were managed by EG Records and signed a record contract with Island Records. With his advance, Eno purchased a flat in Maida Vale, London, which became his home and studio.

Eno played on the first two Roxy Music albums, Roxy Music (1972) and For Your Pleasure (1973). He used the EMS VCS 3 synthesiser and is credited for tape effects, backing vocals and production. Initially, Eno did not appear on stage at Roxy Music shows, but operated the mixing desk, where he had a microphone to sing backup vocals. After they signed a record deal, Eno played the synthesiser onstage and became known for his flamboyant and androgynous costumes and makeup. After the For Your Pleasure tour ended in mid-1973, Eno quit Roxy Music due to disagreements with the singer, Bryan Ferry.

=== Here Come the Warm Jets and Taking Tiger Mountain (By Strategy) (1973—1974) ===
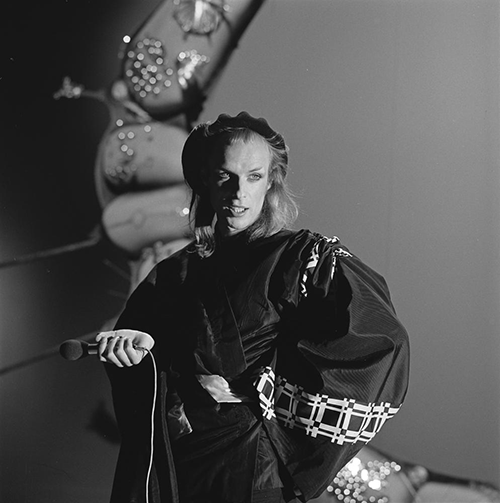
Eno on Dutch television in 1974

In 1973, Eno released (No Pussyfooting), a collaboration with the King Crimson guitarist Robert Fripp. It was recorded using tape loops and delay systems, techniques both Eno and Fripp developed in their later work. Eno's released his first solo album, Here Come the Warm Jets, in February 1974, with Fripp on guitar. It came to be regarded as a classic. That year, Eno embarked on his only solo tour, backed by the pub rock band the Winkies, and recorded a Peel session. The tour ended early when Eno suffered a collapsed lung. Eno disliked touring, finding it uncreative, and spent the rest of his career working mostly in studios.

In mid-1974, Eno performed at the Rainbow Theatre, London, with Kevin Ayers, John Cale and Nico. Sections of the performance were released as the live album June 1, 1974. Eno, Cale and Nico also performed at the Berlin Metamusik Festival. Eno worked as a creative consultant and advisor for Cale on his 1974 album Fear. Critics described Cale as a chaotic force tempered by Eno, and their relationship was sometimes fraught. Eno also contributed to Lady June's Linguistic Leprosy by Lady June, and to The Lamb Lies Down on Broadway by Genesis, both released in 1974.

Eno released his second solo album, Taking Tiger Mountain (By Strategy), in November 1974. It features musicians including the Genesis drummer Phil Collins, the Roxy Music guitarist Phil Manzanera and the Portsmouth Sinfonia, with lyrics about travel and dislocation inspired by a Chinese revolutionary opera. The critic Dave Thompson wrote that the song "Third Uncle" is "a near punk attack of riffing guitars and clattering percussion" that approached heavy metal. As of 1975, both Here Come the Warm Jets and Taking Tiger Mountain had sold more than 100,000 copies each.

In 1974, Eno and the artist Peter Schmidt conceived Oblique Strategies, a set of cards intended to help artists overcome creative problems. Each card bears an instruction, such as "honour thy error as a hidden intention" or "discard an axiom". Eno used them in his work and with artists he worked with.

=== Another Green World and Discreet Music (1975—1976) ===
In 1975, Eno and Fripp performed several shows together. In the same year, Eno founded a record label, Obscure Records, an imprint of Island Records, bridging pop and classical music. Between 1975 and 1978, Obscure released ten albums by experimental and minimalist composers including Eno, John White, Christopher Hobbs, John Adams, Gavin Bryars and Harold Budd.

In November 1975, Eno released his third album, Another Green World, featuring musicians including Collins, Fripp and the bassist Percy Jones. It was a turning point in Eno's career, bridging the guitar-oriented experimental rock of his first two albums with the synthesiser-oriented minimalism of his subsequent work. J. D. Considine wrote in the 2004 Rolling Stone Album Guide that Eno had used the recording studio as an instrument, "moulding directed improvisations, electronic effects, and old-fashioned songcraft into perfectly balanced aural ecosystems". In 2016, Pitchfork called Another Green World Eno's definitive album. AllMusic described it as "a universally acknowledged masterpiece".

In December 1975, Eno released his fourth album, Discreet Music, on Obscure Records. Pitchfork described it as Eno's first ambient record, though Eno had yet to coin the term. It was inspired by Eno's experience recuperating at home following a traffic accident, when his friend, the artist Judy Nylon, visited him and put on a record of harp music. After she had left, Eno realised the amplifier volume was too low and that one speaker was not playing, but he was too weak to get up and correct it. He wrote: "This presented what was for me a new way of hearing music – as part of the ambience of the environment just as the colour of the light and sound of the rain were parts of the ambience." The first side of Discreet Music comprises synthesiser notes in varying patterns, while the second comprises variations on Pachelbel's Canon, creating a "constantly shifting blanket of sound". According to Eno, it was "universally despised by the English pop press".

Also in December 1975, Eno and Fripp released their second album, Evening Star. Pitchfork described it as "confidently serene" compared to the "brashly abrasive" "(No Pussyfooting)", with improved technique and attention to theme, which became crucial to Eno's later work. In 1976, Eno formed the band with 801 musicians including the Roxy Music guitarist, Phil Manzanera. They performed three concerts and released a live album, 801 Live, before disbanding. That September, Eno recorded with the German band Harmonia, living and working in farm buildings in Forst, Lower Saxony. The work was not intended for release; in 1997, it was included on the compilation album Tracks and Traces 1997.

=== David Bowie and Before and After Science (1977) ===
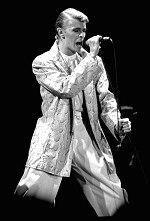
David Bowie in 1978. Eno contributed to Bowie's albums Low (1977), Heroes (1977) and Lodger (1979), known as the Berlin Trilogy, and again on Outside (1995).

After returning to London, Eno co-produced Ultravox! (1977), the debut album by Ultravox. It was the first production role in which Eno demonstrated his potential as an artistic "catalyst", and his facility to combine conventional rock with experimental elements, which became his production hallmark.

Eno was invited to collaborate by the English singer David Bowie on his next album in France, Low, working under the producer Tony Visconti. Though Eno had previously been unenthusiastic about Bowie, saying his music was "better than pleasant" but had "never given me a single new idea", he had enjoyed Bowie's latest album, Station to Station (1976). Bowie had enjoyed Discreet Music and planned to have Eno provide sounds and textures. Eno's initial role was to assist with overdubbing. When Bowie left for Paris to attend legal proceedings, Eno used the time to develop his own compositions, promising to pay for the studio time for any Bowie did not use; Bowie used almost all of them.

On its release in 1977, Low divided listeners, but reached number 2 in the UK Album Chart and helped "cement Bowie's status as an art rock icon". The success boosted Eno's profile; according to his biographer, David Sheppard, Eno's "status as grand vizier to the crowned heads of British art rock was all but assured". In 2017, The Guardian suggested that the Low track "Warszawa" was Eno's best-known work. With Visconti, Eno co-produced Bowie's next album, Heroes (1977), in Berlin. He took a more involved role and received co-writing credits for three tracks, including the successful single "Heroes". Eno declined Bowie's invitation to join the Heroes tour. While in Germany, Eno recorded Cluster & Eno (1977) with the German duo Cluster, comprising former members of Harmonia.

Eno was frustrated by the media attention generated by his work with Bowie and found it difficult to create new music. His systems-based compositional approach was no longer working, and he endlessly edited, saying he was "going mad". Facing pressure from the record company, his health suffered and he experienced stress and insomnia. Eventually, following advice from Bowie, Fripp, and Robert Wyatt, he assembled an album from disparate elements, Before and After Science, released in December 1977. It comprises uptempo art rock with "more pastoral" material on the second half. The critic Jim DeRogatis described its as Eno's coldest and "most clinical" pop record. Before and After Science was voted the year's 12th-best album in Pazz & Jop, an annual poll of American critics published in The Village Voice.

=== More Songs About Buildings and Food and No New York (1978) ===
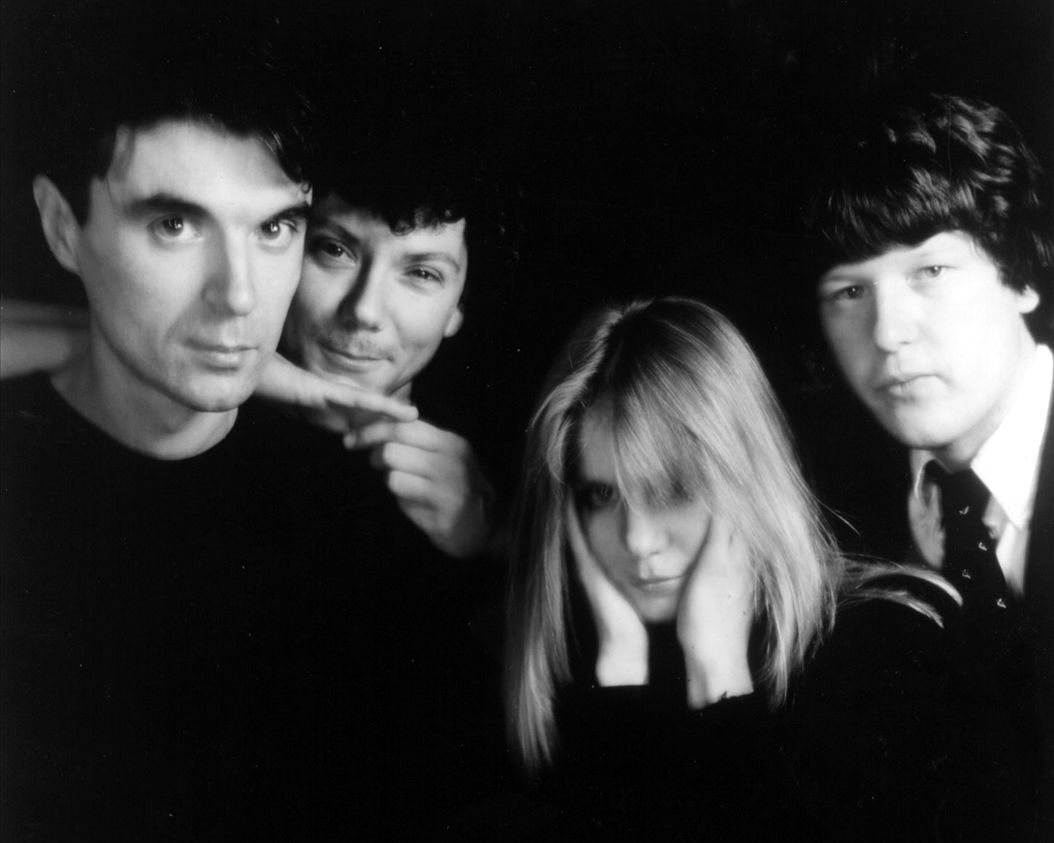
Talking Heads in 1980. Eno produced their records More Songs About Buildings and Food (1978), Fear of Music (1979) and Remain in Light (1980).

In May 1977, Eno befriended the American band Talking Heads after attending one of their shows in London. Eno enjoyed their combination of conceptual lyrics, unorthodox chord structures and groove. He produced their second album, More Songs About Buildings and Food (1978), at Compass Point Studios in Nassau, Bahamas. He processed and augmented the songs with synthesisers and effects such as delay, tremolo and phasers, and experimented with dub reggae production with the engineer Carl Peterson, who was recording Althea & Donna at the same studio. He also moved Talking Heads towards funk, blurring notions of white music and black music when the disco backlash was at its height. More Songs About Buildings and Food reached number 29 on the Billboard 200 and number 21 on the UK Albums Chart.

In April 1978, Eno moved to New York City, initially to mix More Songs About Buildings and Food, and stayed there for five years. In May, he moved into an apartment in Greenwich Village sublet from Steve Maas, the owner of the Mudd Club. He wrote later that his first months in the city were formative: "I didn't know many people, and I had time on my hands, so I was open to things in a way that I might not have been in a more familiar landscape." The critic Simon Reynolds described Eno's years in New York as his "golden period ... without doubt the most fertile and impressive stretch of his life's work". The Talking Heads singer, David Byrne, believed the British press still connected Eno with Roxy Music, and that he was able to escape this in New York.

Eno discovered the emerging New York no wave music scene, a group of dissonant and experimental bands. He produced a no wave compilation, No New York, released by Island Records in early 1978, composed of songs by Mars, DNA, the Contortions and Teenage Jesus and the Jerks. Eno recorded the bands in live takes, with few additions of his own. No New York drew little attention on release, but later became a cult record. In April 1978, Eno and the Cluster members Dieter Moebius and Hans-Joachim Roedelius released After the Heat. It was more song-focused than their previous collaboration, Cluster & Eno, and featured Eno's last vocals on a record for a decade. It also featured the Can bassist, Holger Czukay, whose painstaking tape editing inspired Eno's later work.

=== Devo and Lodger (1978) ===
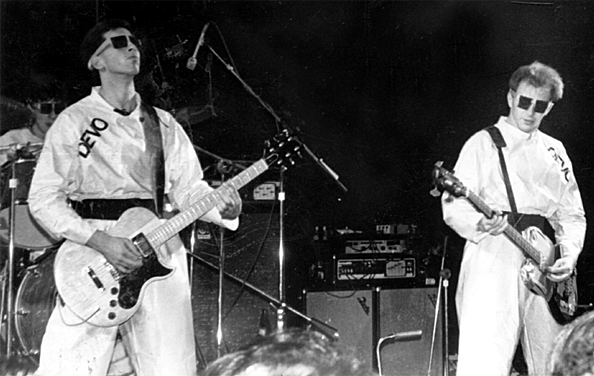
Bob Casale (left) and Gerald Casale of Devo in 1978. Eno produced Devo's debut album, Q. Are We Not Men? A: We Are Devo! (1978).

Eno produced the debut album by the American band Devo, Q. Are We Not Men? A: We Are Devo! (1978). Devo had lobbied for Eno's involvement and he covered all expenses for recording and transportation. The recording was fraught, as Devo resisted Eno's experimental methods and his attempts to add elements, and instead sought to replicate sounds on their demos. Eno called the experience "a nightmare". The vocalist, Mark Mothersbaugh, later conceded that Devo had been too resistant and that "in those days we thought we knew everything". The album was a critical and commercial success, described by Ultimate Classic Rock as one of the most influential new wave albums.

Eno contributed two ambient compositions to the 1978 feature film Jubilee by Derek Jarman. In September, Eno began work at Mountain Studios in Montreux with Visconti on Bowie's next album, Lodger. Eno acted as assistant director, providing feedback and suggesting unusual approaches. For example, he had the guitarist Adrian Belew record his parts without hearing any backing tracks or knowing the key. According to Visconti, whereas Low and Heroes had been more balanced, Eno exerted more control on Lodger. Bowie and Eno's friendship became strained, and Bowie tired of Eno's experimental approach and "endless conceptualising". Lodger received mixed reviews; many critics felt Eno and Bowie's collaboration had lost momentum. The three albums Eno created with Bowie in the 1970s came to be known as the Berlin Trilogy.

Eno returned to visual art, building a light installation he called the Patented Invention and experimenting with video. After the Low recording session ended, Eno visited Pete Sinfield, who had produced Roxy Music's first album, in his home in Ibiza. They recorded an album, In a Land of Clear Colours. It was released in 1,000 copies in a local art gallery and became a collector's item. In September 1978, Eno released Music for Films, a library album of compositions Eno proposed could be licensed for film, television and theatre, including outtakes from Another Green World.

=== Music for Airports and Fear of Music (1979) ===
All the signs were in the air all around with ambient music in the mid-1970s, and other people were doing a similar thing. I just gave it a name. Which is exactly what it needed ... Giving something a name can be just the same as inventing it. By naming something you create a difference. You say that this is now real. Names are very important.

— Eno, 2010

In February 1979, Eno released the first album in his Ambient series, Ambient 1: Music for Airports, conceived as a soundtrack that could be played in airports. Eno created tape loops from sounds including notes sung by a trio of female singers and piano played by Wyatt and used them to create cycles of overlapping sounds. He coined the term ambient music to describe his work.

Music for Airports initially divided listeners and the term "Eno-esque" became a pejorative in NME reviews. Eno said critics felt he had "abandoned the 'true flame' of passionate, rebellious rock 'n' roll for something that was variously described as 'cold', 'emotionless', 'dull', 'tuneless', 'comfortable' and 'Muzak'." However, Music for Airports later attracted acclaim and became one of Eno's highest-selling solo albums, selling 200,000 copies. In 2016, Pitchfork named it the greatest ambient album. Eno's biographer, David Sheppard, called it his "most iconic and enduring work".

Eno produced the third Talking Heads record, Fear of Music (1979), recorded in the Manhattan loft where Talking Heads rehearsed. Eno exerted greater creative input, dramatically altering arrangements, treating songs with effects and synthesisers, and using unusual methods to encourage performances, such as having Byrne sing while exercising. Eno also began experimenting with video art, filming the view from his apartment with a video camera. His first video installation, displayed on three upturned television sets, was displayed at the Kitchen, Manhattan, in July, accompanied by a performance by Fripp. In the same month, Eno gave a lecture at the Kitchen about using the studio as compositional tool. He argued that the recording studio was not simply a means to document a performance but a "laboratory" in which sounds could be created.

=== Remain in Light (1980) ===
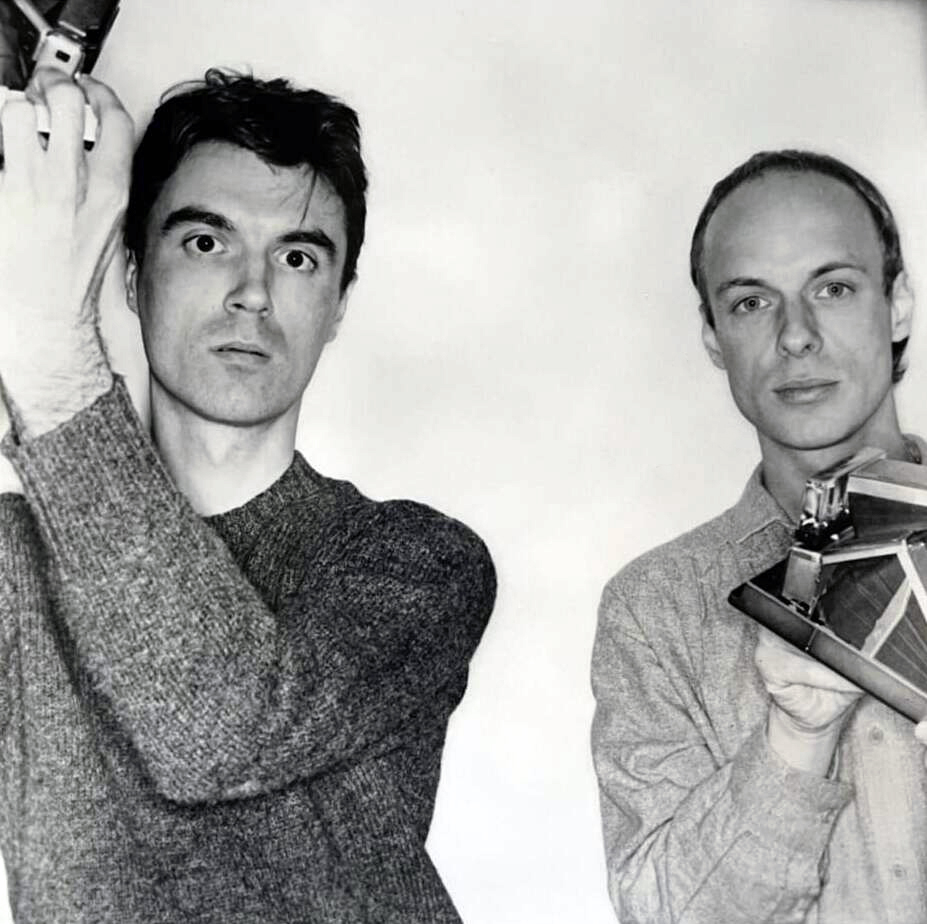
Eno (right) with David Byrne of Talking Heads in 1981. Eno and Byrne released the albums My Life in the Bush of Ghosts (1981) and Everything That Happens Will Happen Today (2008).

In April 1980, Eno released Ambient 2: The Plateaux of Mirror, a collaboration with the composer Harold Budd, comprising processed piano pieces. In the same month, he and the trumpeter Jon Hassell released the album Fourth World, Vol. 1: Possible Musics, melding minimalism, jazz and ambient sounds. Eno scored Herbert Vesely's film Egon Schiele – Exzess und Bestrafung (1980).

In 1980, Eno produced his final album with Talking Heads, Remain in Light. Inspired by Afrobeat, Byrne and Eno's concept was to record numerous simple parts that would interlock to create complexity, with few chord changes. Tensions arose with the other band members, who felt Eno and Byrne were too controlling. The band agreed to split songwriting credits with Eno, but rejected his request to credit the record to "Talking Heads and Brian Eno". Eno later said he and Byrne had received too much credit for Remain in Light, and that had not been able to take it as far as he had wanted for fear of "usurping the compositional role any more than I had done already". The English band Wire decided against working with Eno for fear that he would divide them.

Remain in Light was a critical and commercial success. Rolling Stone wrote in 2023 that Eno had been the ideal producer for Talking Heads and that "their trilogy of albums with him made the band's reputation". Reynolds wrote that they and Eno developed a "group identity", likening them to George Martin and the Beatles.

=== My Life in the Bush of Ghosts and Apollo (1981–1983) ===
Eno produced Ambient 3: Day of Radiance (1981) by Laraaji, with ringing tones and repetitive rhythms reminiscent of gamelan music. In February 1981, Eno and Byrne released My Life in the Bush of Ghosts. Recorded before Remain in Light, it integrates samples of sources including Arabic singers, radio DJs and an exorcist. Musicians had used similar techniques before, but, according to the Guardian writer Dave Simpson, never "to such cataclysmic effect". Eno felt the album's innovation was to make samples "the lead vocal". Though it came to be seen as groundbreaking, My Life in the Bush of Ghost initially received weak reviews, disappointing Eno and leading him further from song-based music.

Broome Street, Lower Manhattan, where Eno lived between 1981 and 1984

In early 1981, Eno purchased a loft apartment on Broome Street, Manhattan, and fitted it with a home studio. That year, Eno's video artworks Two Fifth Avenue and White Fence were displayed in Grand Central Terminal and in galleries across North America. His first major video work, Mistaken Memories of Medieval Manhattan, comprised slowed-down footage of New York filmed from his apartment displayed on a television lying on its side. Eno aimed to create a "video painting" that would function less as a short film and more as "something beautiful to look at, like a picture". Though Mistaken Memories of Medieval Manhattan was exhibited in Europe, including in London and Oxford, Eno's visual art received little attention in the UK.

In March 1982, Eno released Ambient 4: On Land, inspired by his childhood memories of the Suffolk countryside. Pitchfork described it as "fantastically creepy ... a dark piece of music with a serious sense of tension". In 1983, EG released a box set of Eno's solo work, Working Backwards 1983–1973, including the compilation album Music for Films Volume 2. It was Eno's final release on EG before it was absorbed into Virgin Records. That year, Eno released the ambient album Apollo: Atmospheres and Soundtracks, written and recorded with his brother, Roger Eno, and Daniel Lanois. It was commissioned by Al Reinert for his 1985 film For All Mankind, a documentary about the Apollo 11 landing. It includes "zero-gravity country music", with slide guitar treated with long reverb. In 2017, The Guardian described the track "An Ending (Ascent)" as one of Eno's "crowning achievements".

=== First U2 work (1984–1993) ===
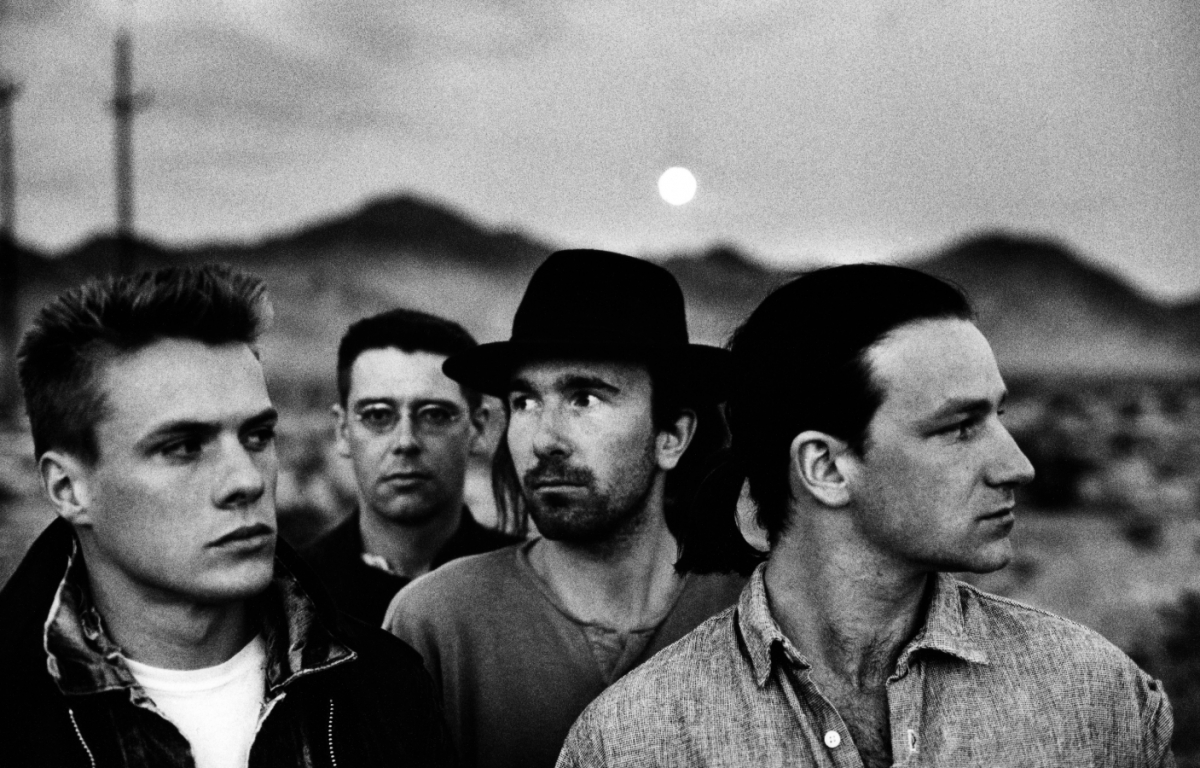
A promotional image of U2 for their 1987 album The Joshua Tree, one of several U2 albums produced by Eno.

Eno contributed "Prophesy Theme" to the soundtrack of the 1984 film Dune by David Lynch. In August 1984, Eno and Budd released their second ambient album, The Pearl. In late 1984, after his home and studio was burgled, Eno moved back into his flat in London. He said later: "My first feeling was relief: I didn't have to go back there. New York is both thrilling, because it's intense, and wearing, because it's so inward-looking. It wasn't until the apartment looting that I allowed myself to realise I had no further reason to stay."

The Irish rock band U2 enlisted Eno and Lanois to produce their fourth album, The Unforgettable Fire (1984). The bassist, Adam Clayton, said U2 were "looking for something that was a bit more serious, more arty". Eno was hesitant to work with a rock band and initially told U2 he was considering retiring from music to become a video artist. The guitarist, the Edge, said Eno was intimidated by their "lack of irony". Eno was eventually persuaded by what he called their "lyrical soul in abundance". The Unforgettable Fire was voted the year's 29th-best record in Pazz & Jop.

In 1984, Eno and his manager and future wife, Anthea Norman-Taylor, founded Opal Records, a management company, publisher and record label. Norman-Taylor said their aim was to be like EG but "without the sharp practice". It released records by "outsider" acts such as Lanois, Hassell, Budd, Cale, Roger Eno, Budd, Michael Brook and Laraaji. In 1987, Opal signed a worldwide distribution deal with Warner Bros. In 1985, Eno released Thursday Afternoon, comprising a single hour-long track of "shimmering" loops of piano and electronics. Its length was impossible on vinyl, and it was promoted as the first album composed with the compact disc in mind. It was accompanied a video work commissioned by Sony, designed to be viewed on a television set placed on its side. In 1986, Eno and Russel Mills published a book of lyrics and art, More Dark Than Shark.

Eno and Lanois produced U2's next album, The Joshua Tree (1987). It sold more than 25 million copies worldwide, becoming one of the highest-selling albums in history. It was nominated for four Grammy Awards, winning Album of the Year and Best Rock Performance by a Duo or Group with Vocal. Rolling Stone included The Joshua Tree in its 2012 list of the 500 greatest albums.

=== Generative music and Achtung Baby (1990–1991) ===
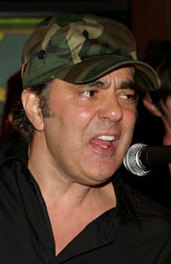
Daniel Lanois (pictured in 2007) co-produced four U2 albums with Eno, and contributed to several of Eno's ambient albums.

In 1990, Eno released a pop album with John Cale, Wrong Way Up, the first record to feature vocals from Eno in years. The recording was tense, as Cale found Eno controlling and Eno found Cale irrational. Eno said he urinated into "Fountain", the urinal sculpture by Marcel Duchamp, while it was on display in the New York Museum of Modern Art in 1990. Eno objected to the level of prestige around the sculpture, saying it missed its message that any object can be art, and so decided "somebody should piss in that thing, to sort of bring it back to where it belonged". He had to apply the urine through a tube due to security glass.

Eno and Lanois produced U2's seventh album, Achtung Baby (1991). Eno took on an assisting role, working with U2 for a week at a time to review their songs before leaving for a month or two. Eno said his role was "to come in and erase anything that sounded too much like U2". He stripped away overdubbing he considered excessive, which U2 believed "saved the album". Eno and Lanois used lateral thinking and a philosophical approach popularised by Eno's Oblique Strategies. Achtung Baby sold more than 18 million copies and has been acclaimed as one of the greatest albums.

Between sessions with U2, Eno recorded his next solo album, My Squelchy Life, his first song-based solo album since Before and After Science. After Opal was restructured as an administrative office, Eno signed to Warner Records. When Warner delayed My Squelchy Life to 1992, Eno cancelled its release, feeling it did not represent the "cutting edge" of his work. It was eventually released on the 2014 reissue of his 1992 album Nerve Net. Pitchfork called it Eno's most enjoyable solo 1990s album "by a wide margin".

=== Zooropa, James and Windows 95 (1992–1995) ===
James in 2011. Eno produced the James albums Laid (1993), Wah Wah (1994) and Millionaires (1999).

In 1992, Eno released Nerve Net, comprising a mixture of instrumental and vocal tracks, and The Shutov Assembly, comprising electronic sketches for future orchestral works. In 1993, he released Neroli, comprising a single hour-long ambient composition. Eno and his assistant Mark "Flood" Ellis produced U2's eighth album, Zooropa (1993). As with the Achtung Baby sessions, Eno worked two-week shifts. U2 often gave him in-progress songs to adjust and add his own personality. Eno contributed to the Jane Siberry album When I Was a Boy and the Geoffrey Oryema album Beat the Border, and co-wrote one song on Souvlaki by the shoegaze band Slowdive, all released in 1993.

Eno produced Bright Red (1994) by Laurie Anderson. Whereas album production usually begins with recording the rhythm section, Eno began by recording Anderson's voice and building instruments around it, a technique he used in later work. Eno produced the James albums Laid (1993) and Wah Wah (1994), recorded simultaneously. Laid, comprising more accessible songs, was a critical and commercial success, while Wah Wah, a more experimental record assembled from improvisations, received mixed reviews.

In 1994, Microsoft commissioned Eno to compose the Microsoft Sound, the startup music for the Windows 95 operating system. Eno enjoyed the challenge of composing a very short piece of music intended to evoke emotion, a concept he found "funny and amazing". The Microsoft Sound is likely Eno's most heard composition; Pitchfork suggested it was one of the most frequently heard pieces of music in North America. In 2025, it was selected for preservation in the US National Recording Registry by the Library of Congress. After they met by chance on holiday, Eno reunited with Bryan Ferry to contribute to his 1994 album Mamouna.

=== Bowie, War Child, generative music and Passengers (1995–1999) ===
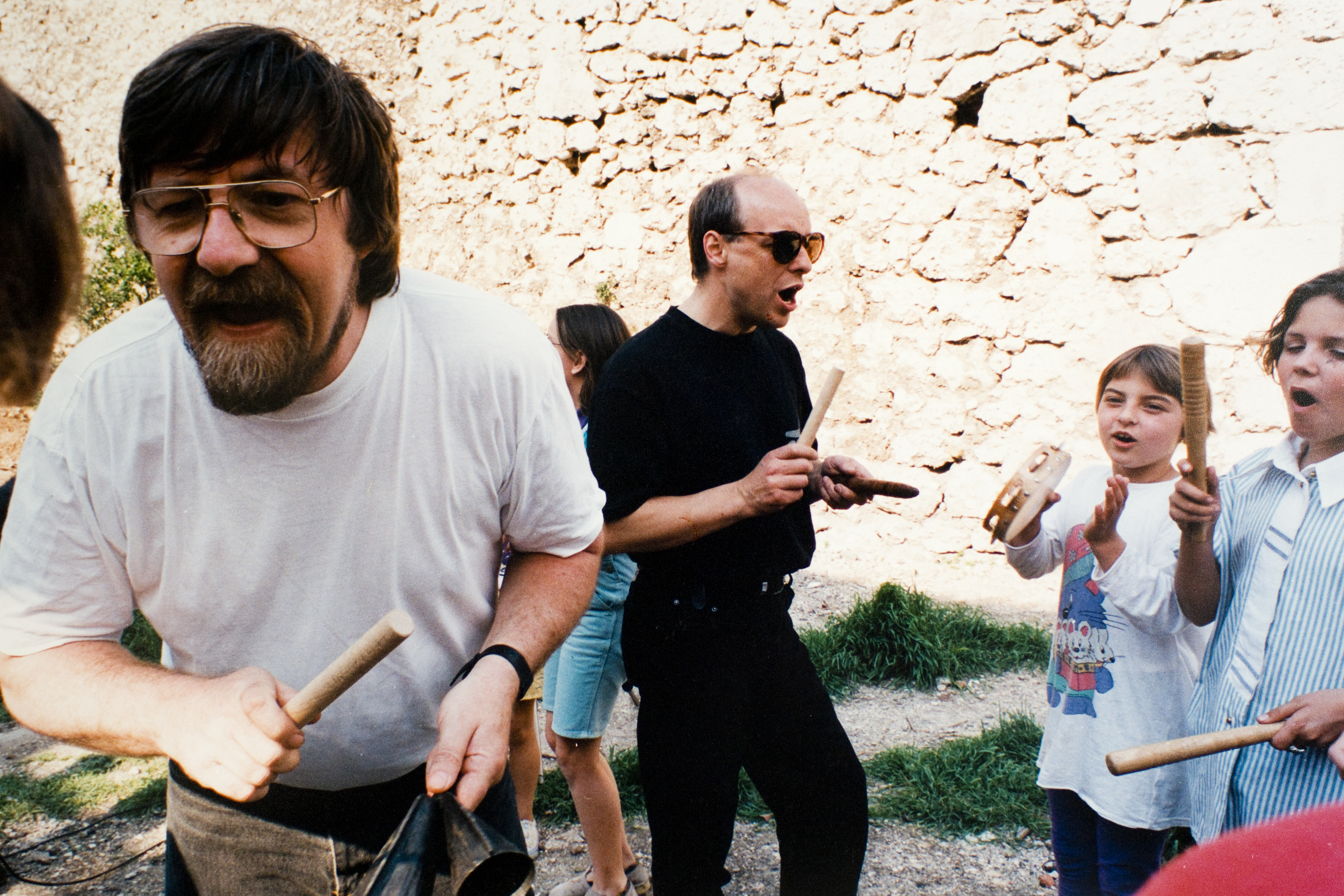
Nigel Osborne and Eno (centre) in 1995, leading music workshops in Mostar, Bosnia

Eno reunited with Bowie to co-produce his 1995 album Outside. It was Bowie's most experimental album since the Berlin period, and confused listeners. In 1995, Eno travelled with the composer and aid worker Nigel Osborne to Bosnia in the aftermath of the Bosnian War to work with war-traumatised children, many of whom had been orphaned. Osborne and Eno led music therapy projects run by the War Child charity in Mostar. Eno mixed and mastered The Help Album, a 1995 compilation album by various artists released to raise funds for War Child.

From 1995, Eno began using the term generative music to describe music created through parameters set by the artist to generate evolving and unpredictable compositions. This produces music that slowly unfolds in almost infinite combinations of sound. In 1995, he released Generative Music 1 on floppy disk, a music application created with the software Koan. It generates music differently each time it runs, using rules defined by Eno. The Independent wrote that it would please fans of Eno's ambient music, but that it required an expensive sound card.

In 1995, Eno and U2 released the album Original Soundtracks 1, featuring the tenor Luciano Pavarotti. Due to its experimental nature and Eno's participation, it was released under the name Passengers. It received mixed reviews and sold fewer copies than U2 standards, but the single "Miss Sarajevo" reached number 6 in the UK singles chart. In 1996, Eno published A Year with Swollen Appendices, a diary covering 1995. Eno scored the 1996 television series Neverwhere, based on the novel by Neil Gaiman. At the 1996 Brit Awards, Eno won the Freddie Mercury Award for outstanding consciousness-raising, for the Help! album. At the ceremony, the Pulp singer, Jarvis Cocker, ran on stage to protest Michael Jackson's performance, which he found tasteless. After the tabloid press criticised Cocker, Eno took out an advert in broadsheet newspapers the following week to support him.

In 1997, Eno and his family spent around six months living in Saint Petersburg, Russia. Eno wanted to challenge himself by living somewhere where he was unknown: "Once you reach a certain level of celebrity in England you can coast for the rest of your life without having another idea, and the prospect of that distressed me. I turn 50 next year and going there was a way of finding out what was left if I eliminated all the distractions and flattering invitations that fill my life." In Saint Petersburg, Eno staged installations, including a generative music piece at the Pavlovsk Palace and an audio-visual work, Lightness, in the Marble Palace. He also wrote a column for The Observer about his life there.

Also in 1997, Eno also contributed to the Can remix album Sacrilege, remixed an unreleased Roy Orbison song for the film The End of Violence, and contributed synthesiser and backing vocals to the album Shleep by Robert Wyatt. In July, Eno released his fourteenth album, The Drop, comprising generative music made using piano, drum machines and voice samples. Eno conceived it as "jazz that nobody asked for". It received mainly negative reviews. Eno followed The Drop with a string of limited-edition soundtracks to installation artworks. He appeared as Father Brian Eno in "Going to America", the final episode of the sitcom Father Ted, broadcast on 1 May 1998 on Channel 4. Eno produced the James album Millionaires (1999).

=== All That You Can't Leave Behind, apps and 77 Million Paintings (2000–2007) ===
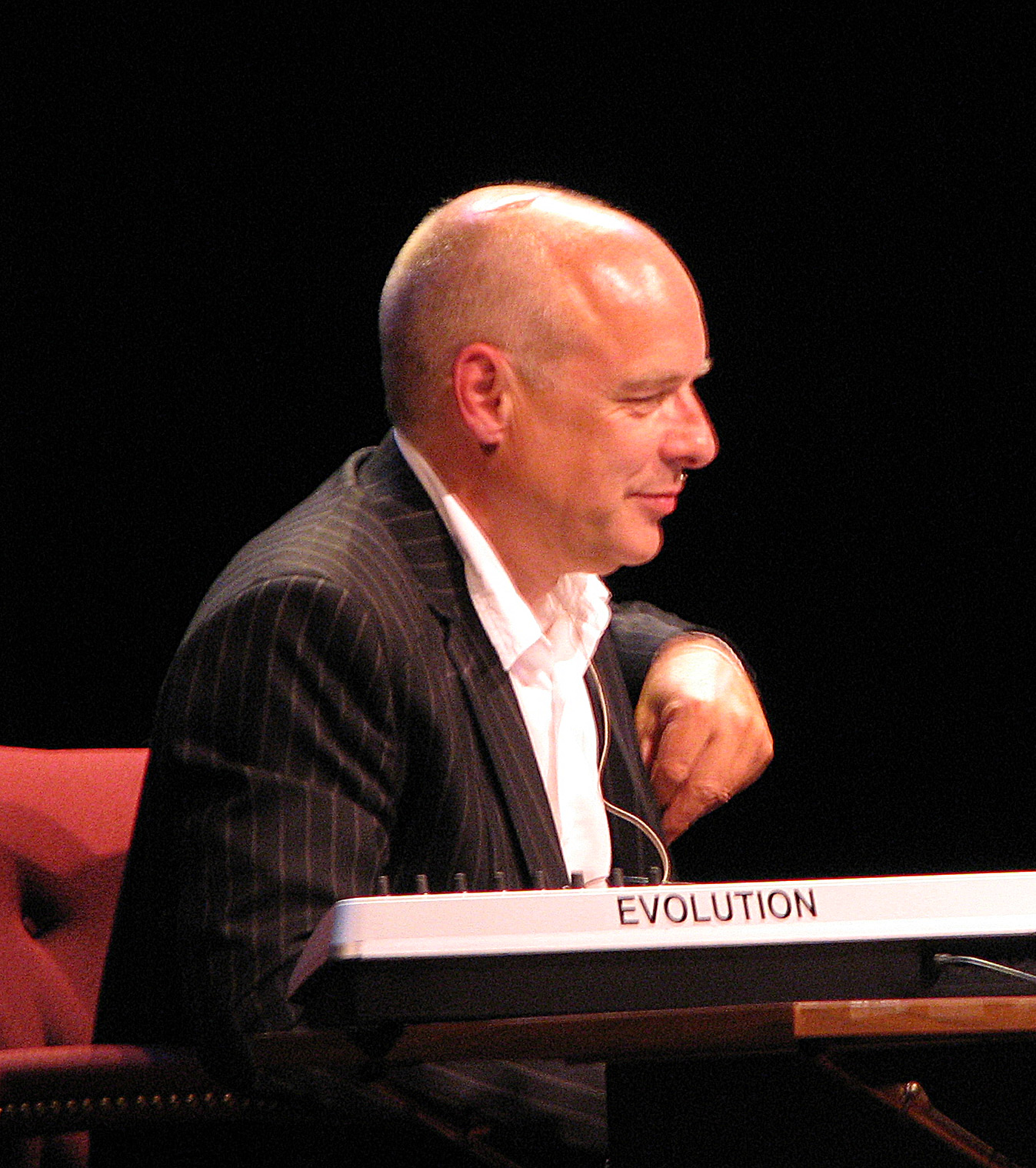
Eno at the Long Now Foundation, 26 June 2006

Eno and Lanois produced U2's tenth album, All That You Can't Leave Behind (2000). U2 had wanted to write new material before beginning recording, but Eno convinced them to write quickly in the studio. Rolling Stone declared it "U2's third masterpiece", alongside The Joshua Tree and Achtung Baby. It became the fourth-highest-selling U2 album, with sales of more than 12 million as of 2014. In 2001, Eno released an ambient album with the German composer J. Peter Schwalm, Drawn from Life. In 2004, Fripp and Eno released their third album, The Equatorial Stars.

Eno contributed to Tékitoi (2004) and Zoom (2013) by the French-Algerian Raï singer Rachid Taha. In June 2005, Eno released his 13th album, Another Day on Earth, comprising mostly electronic pop songs. Eno contributed keyboards to the Coldplay album X&Y (2005) and composed the score for the 2005 film The Jacket. In 2005, he worked with Travis on the early stages of their album The Boy With No Name (2007). Eno is credited for "sonic landscape" on Paul Simon's 2006 album Surprise. The Guardian wrote that his "provocative, liberating influence ... is all over Surprise ... Eno's production ebbs and flows like a digitalised Greek chorus." Eno initially found Simon controlling, but they eventually formed "a very good relationship".

A generative art installation by Eno, 77 Million Paintings, debuted in Tokyo in 2006 and made its North American premiere in San Francisco in 2007. Eno developed software to overlap images randomly, creating constantly moving patterns.

=== Coldplay and Everything That Happens Will Happen Today (2008–2010) ===
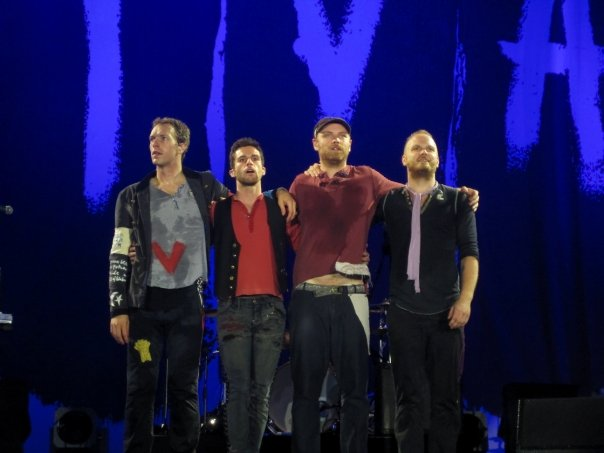
Coldplay in 2008 on their Viva la Vida Tour. Eno collaborated with Coldplay on their albums Viva la Vida or Death and All His Friends (2008) and Mylo Xyloto (2011).

Eno created a procedural soundtrack for the video game Spore (2008), which changes in response to player actions. In 2008, Eno and the software designer Peter Chilvers released Bloom, an iOS app for creating generative music. It was followed in 2012 by another app, Scape.

Eno and Markus Dravs produced the fourth album by Coldplay, Viva la Vida or Death and All His Friends (2008). After their previous album received mixed reviews, Coldplay enlisted Eno to help them improve. The singer, Chris Martin, said Eno "broke us down in a sort of military boot-camp way", telling them: "Your songs are too long and you're too repetitive, and you use the same tricks too much, and big things aren't necessarily good things, and you use the same sounds too much, and your lyrics are not good enough." Eno encouraged Coldplay to pursue different instrumentation and song structures. Viva la Vida was the world's highest-selling album that year, at nine million copies.

Eno contributed to the 2008 Grace Jones album Hurricane. In 2008, Eno and Byrne released their second album together, Everything That Happens Will Happen Today. Pitchfork said it was "nothing whatsoever" like their previous album, My Life in the Bush of Ghosts; Eno and Byrne described it as "electronic gospel". Eno, Lanois and Steve Lillywhite produced the 12th album by U2, No Line on the Horizon, released in February 2009. In June, Eno curated the inaugural Luminous Festival in Sydney, where 77 Million Paintings was projected into the sails of the Sydney Opera House. Eno scored Peter Jackson's film The Lovely Bones, released in December. With Chris Martin, Eno wrote "Lukas" on the 2009 album Come to Life by Natalie Imbruglia.

Eno was the artistic director for the 2010 Brighton Festival, where he gave a lecture and performed with artists including the Necks, Karl Hyde (of Underworld), Jon Hopkins and Leo Abrahams. Eno signed to Warp Records in 2010. His first Warp release was Small Craft on a Milk Sea with Hopkins and Abrahams, based on compositions Eno wrote for The Lovely Bones. On 4 July 2011, Eno and the poet Rick Holland released the album Drums Between the Bells. Eno co-produced Lifelines, an album of covers by Andrea Corr (2011). He also contributed to Coldplay's fifth album, Mylo Xyloto, released in 2011. Coldplay used the term "enoxification" to describe his role, which they said involved fearless experimentation.

=== Further ambient work (2012–2019) ===
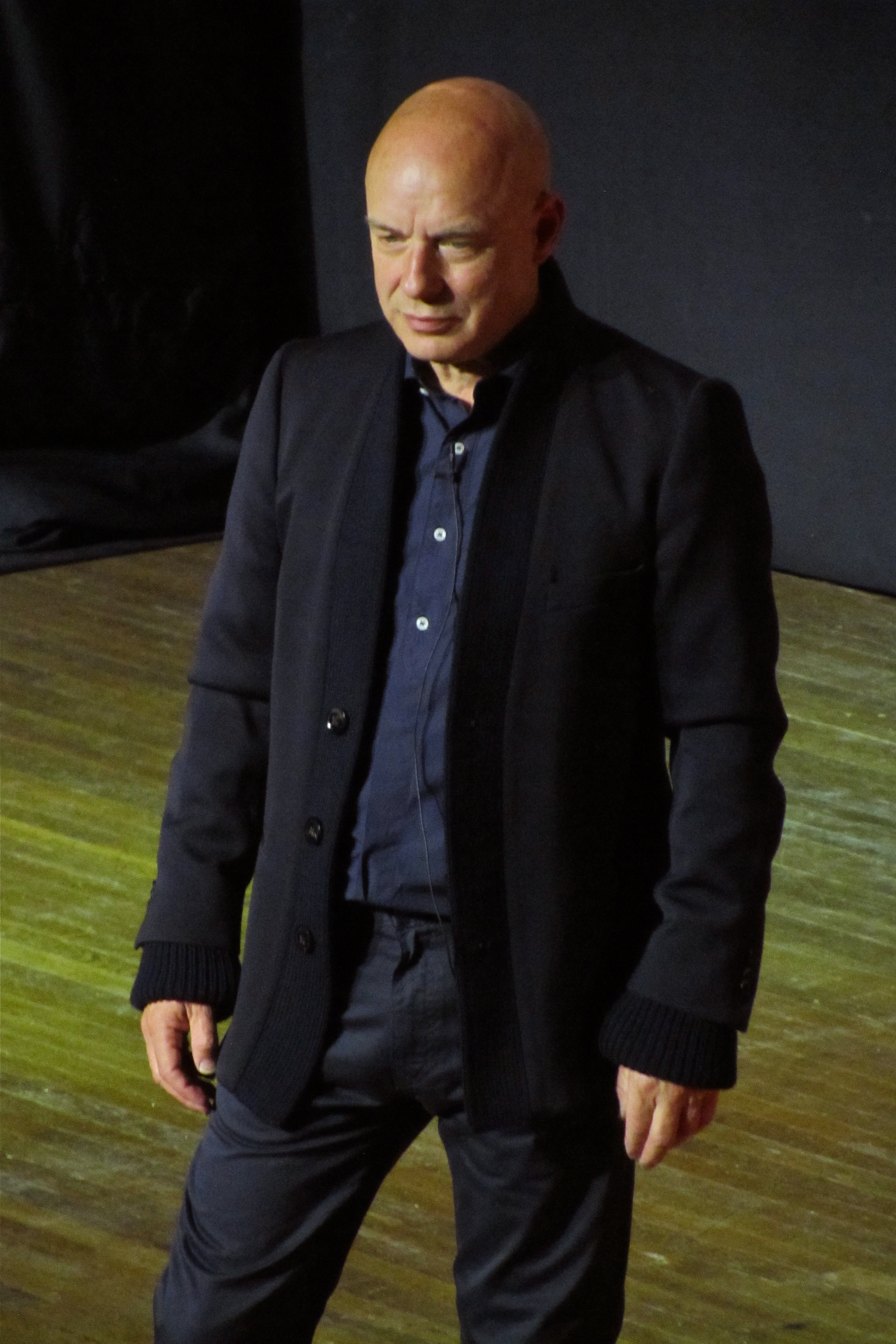
Eno at Moogfest, Asheville, North Carolina, 2011

For his soundtrack for the Channel 4 thriller series Top Boy, Eno won the 2012 BAFTA for best original music. In November 2012, Eno released Lux through Warp. It comprises a 76-minute ambient composition in four sections created for an art installation. In 2013, a "quiet room" featuring Eno's ambient music and video art was installed at the Montefiore Hospital in Hove.

In May 2014, Eno and Hyde released Someday World, featuring musicians including Will Champion of Coldplay, Andy Mackay of Roxy Music and Fred Again. A second album by Eno and Hyde, High Life, followed in June. In July, Eno announced that he would contribute soothing music to the A&E department of Chelsea and Westminster Hospital in London. Eno sang on, co-wrote, and co-produced "Heavy Seas of Love" from the debut solo album by Damon Albarn, Everyday Robots (2014). In January 2016, Anthony Kiedis, the singer of the Red Hot Chili Peppers, said Eno had declined eight requests to produce them.

Eno contributed music to the "Otherworlds" exhibition of planetary photography by Michael Benson, which was displayed in the London Natural History Museum in 2016. In April, Eno released his 26th album, The Ship, on Warp, a mixture of ambient and pop. It was the first Eno album to feature vocals since Another Day on Earth (2005). It includes a poem read by Peter Serafinowicz and a cover of the 1969 Velvet Underground song "I'm Set Free". Eno co-produced and contributed to the album Love Without Violins by the Gift, released on 30 September 2016.

Eno released Reflection, an album of ambient generative music, on Warp on 1 January 2017. It was nominated for the 2017 Grammy Award for Best New Age Album. Eno co-wrote and co-produced "Aliens" from Coldplay's 2017 EP Kaleidoscope. In October, Eno and Kevin Shields released the single "Only Once Away My Son". In December, Eno released an album with the pianist Tom Rogerson, Finding Shore, through Dead Oceans. Eno manipulated Rogerson's piano via MIDI, creating a combination of classical, ambient and jazz.

In April 2018, Eno and Shields released a second track, "The Weight of History", for Record Store Day. Eno also released Music for Installations, a compilation of ambient and generative music created for art installations and exhibitions. In 2019, Eno participated in DAU, an immersive art installation in Paris by Ilya Khrzhanovsky that recreated life under Soviet rule. That March, Eno was inducted into the Rock and Roll Hall of Fame as a member of Roxy Music. He did not attend the induction ceremony, as he was avoiding flying for environmental reasons.

=== ForeverAndEverNoMore, Secret Life and documentary (2020–present) ===
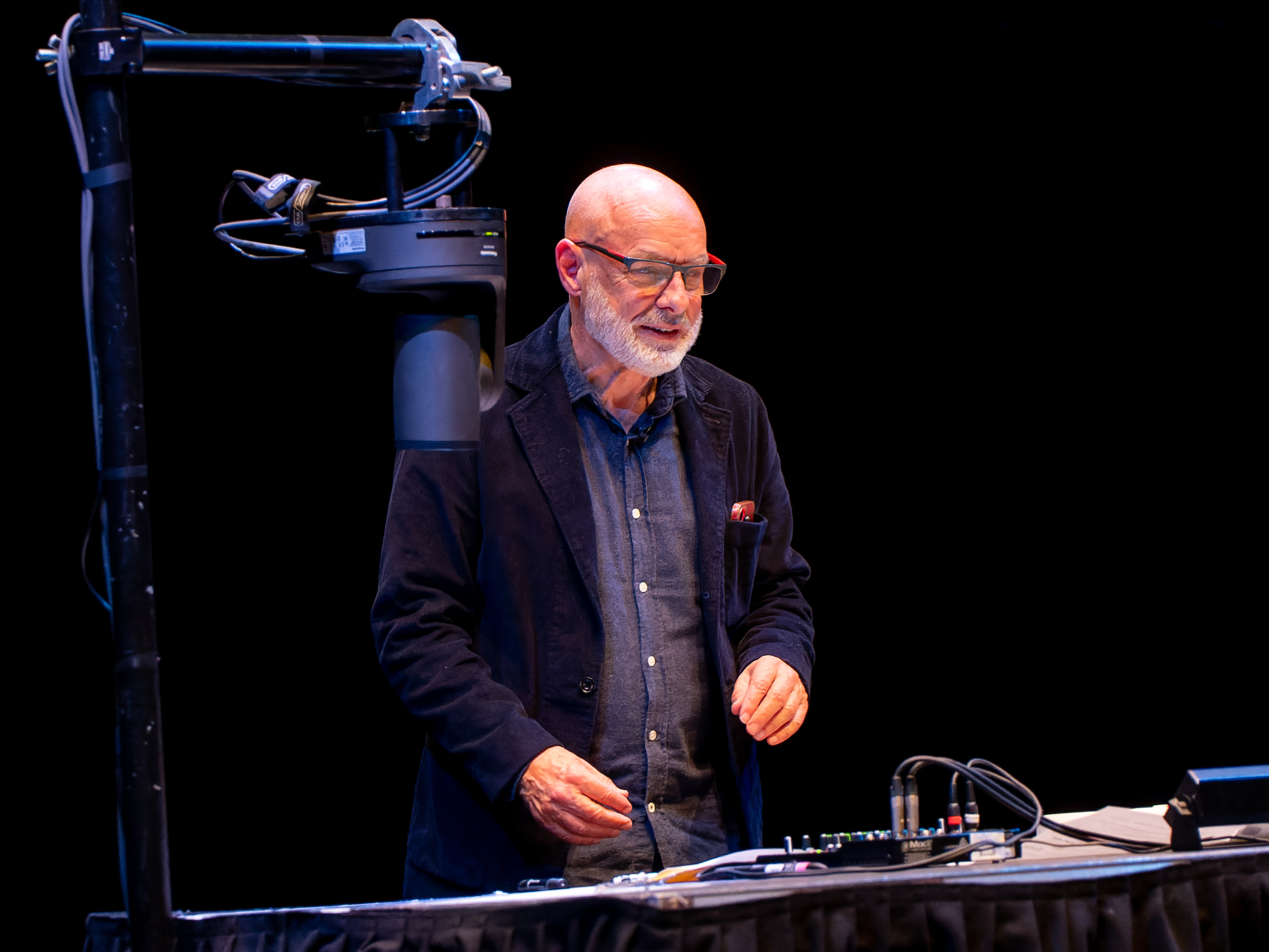
Eno at the Barbican Centre, London, on 23 October 2022

Eno contributed production and synthesiser programming to "Homing" from Don't Shy Away (2020) by Loma. Eno collaborated with Laurie Anderson and Ebe Oke on Dokument #2, released exclusively on 500 vinyl copies in 2020. It was recorded over five days in Copenhagen in 2016. In March 2020, Brian and Roger Eno released the album Mixing Colours. It was created over the course of 15 years, with the brothers exchanging and manipulating MIDI files. In August 2021, Brian and Roger performed Mixing Colours live at the Acropolis of Athens as part of the annual Epidaurus Festival. It was released as a concert film, Live at the Acropolis, in March 2023.

Eno scored Ben Lawrence's 2021 documentary Ithaka, about the incarceration of Julian Assange. In June, he launched a Sonos radio station, the Lighthouse, that plays random selections of his music, including hundreds of new and unreleased tracks. In October 2022, Eno released the album ForeverAndEverNoMore, comprising songs rather than ambient music. Reviewing it for The Guardian, Sophie Harris wrote that "Eno 's voice is deeper now and more commanding". Eno met Fred Gibson, also known as Fred Again, at a singing group organised by Eno and became his mentor. They released an album, Secret Life, in May 2023. "Enough" was nominated for the Ivor Novello Award for best contemporary song on 23 May 2024.

Eno programmed part of the lighting show for U2's 2023 residency residency at the Sphere, Las Vegas, based on his visual artwork. That year Eno toured Europe on his first solo tour, Ships, based on The Ship, backed by Serafinowicz, the Baltic Sea Philharmonic, Leo Abrahams and Peter Chilvers. A documentary, Eno, directed by Gary Hustwit, was released in 2024. Software randomly selected from hours of interviews and archival footage to create a unique film on each screening, thereby creating the first "generative" feature film. In 2025, Faber & Faber published a book by Eno and Bette Adriaanse, What Art Does, that examines the role of art in society and its impact on human experience. In March, Eno released an ambient album exclusively on Apple Music, Aurum, which uses spatial audio. That year, he and Beatie Wolfe released three ambient albums on Verve Records: Luminal, Lateral and Liminal. Eno contributed to the 2026 EP Easter Lily by U2. In September, Eno relaunched Opal Records to reissue Another Day on Earth and Drawn from Life, which had been unavailable outside Japan for several years.

== Artistry ==
Eno came to prominence as a member of Roxy Music in the 1970s. Pitchfork described him as once "the very embodiment of glam panache", with eyeliner and feather boas, but later became known as a "sort of kindly philosophy professor". His 1970s costumes were created with the designer Carol McNicoll. Eno did not like being "in the spotlight" in Roxy Music and preferred a behind-the-scenes role. Pitchfork wrote that in the 1970s Eno had been "one of our most dynamic, flamboyant live performers. Eno had what it took to be a genuine rock star." Eno said later that he did not enjoy touring and did not find it creative, and that he was instead "a technologist, manipulating studios and musicians in a funny way".

Sasha Frere-Jones wrote that Eno opposes the notion of genius, and instead "emphasises the power of collaboration within systems: instructions, rules, and self-imposed limits". Eno coined the word "scenius", a portmanteau of "genius" and "scene", to describe the power of groups working collaboratively. He argued that "the quality of works produced in a certain time and place is more indebted to the friction between the people on hand than to the work of any single artist". In 2015, Eno gave a John Peel lecture on the question of why humans create art. He defined art as activity humans undertake which is not strictly unnecessary, such as baking and dancing, and argued that its purpose is to simulate experiences which might be otherwise dangerous.

=== Musicianship ===
Eno describes himself as a "non-musician", a term he once attempted to list as his profession in his passport. He has no formal music training and cannot read music notation, feeling music theory can prevent artists from exploring certain areas. The Roxy Music guitarist Phil Manzanera recalled the difficulty of teaching Eno how to interpret time signatures.

Eno mostly writes melodies by searching for notes that fit and discovering notes that "don't fit in a very interesting way". In 1974, he told Rolling Stone that he could not play any instruments "in any technically viable" sense, and that technique can be a barrier. Eno opposes the assumption that virtuosity is essential to music, which he felt was particularly untrue for rock, and that calling himself a "non-musician" was the best way to describe his approach. He said the term "musician" usually describes "someone with a digital skill that they then apply to an instrument"; by comparison, his skills were not manual but "to do with ingenuity".

Eno's collaborator David Byrne said: "He calls himself a non-musician even though he can play really well. But he plays as a non-musician, which allows him to step back and not get wrapped up in the technique of fingering or chords. He can see the big picture, the structure, the texture of it." Manzanera said: "Though Brian may have called himself a non-musician, he was obviously applying musician-type criteria to everything he did ... You can hear the musician in him because he's singing melodies and writing lyrics."

Eno sings on many of his records, and sang on records he made with Bowie, Talking Heads, U2 and Cluster. In the 1990s, Eno said he had performed uncredited backing vocals on several well known songs.

=== Methods ===
Eno has spread his techniques and theories primarily through his production. His style informed projects in which he has been involved, including Bowie's Berlin Trilogy (helping to popularise minimalism) and the albums he produced for Talking Heads (incorporating, on Eno's advice, African music and polyrhythms), Devo, and other groups. Eno's first collaboration with David Byrne, 1981's My Life in the Bush of Ghosts, used sampling techniques and broke ground by incorporating world music into popular Western music forms. Eno's "unconventional studio predilections", in common with those of Peter Gabriel, were an influence on the recording of "In the Air Tonight", the single which launched the solo career of the Genesis drummer Phil Collins. Collins said he learned from working with Eno.

The academic Adam Bell credits Eno with popularising the concept of the recording studio as an instrument. Under producers such as Eno, "using the studio as an instrument became less about working the system as it were, and working the systems". Daniel Lanois, who contributed to several of Eno's ambient albums and co-produced several U2 records with him, said Eno's "genius" was his ability to quickly present a new way to look at things and act as a "catalyst". According to Jason Ankeny of AllMusic, "Eno champions theory over practice, serendipity over forethought, and texture over craft." According to the writer Sasha Frere-Jones, "Eno often works with highly skilled musicians, and then asks them to play against their own virtuosity."

Eno and Peter Schmidt's Oblique Strategies have been used by many bands, and Eno's production style has proven influential in several general respects: "his recording techniques have helped change the way that modern musicians;– particularly electronic musicians;– view the studio. No longer is it just a passive medium through which they communicate their ideas but itself a new instrument with seemingly endless possibilities." According to Vinyl Me, Please writer Jack Riedy, Eno's peak as an artist coincided with the album era – a period in popular music during which the album surpassed the single as the dominant recorded-music format – "and Eno took full advantage of the format to pursue all his musical ideas on wax".

=== Influences ===
Eno's interest in art was sparked by a tiny reproduction of a canvas by Piet Mondrian he received when he was 10. Eno said his music is minimalistic, similarly to Mondrian's work. The Who and the Velvet Underground were other early influences, as Eno felt they successfully combined music and art. In 1995, Eno said African music "underlies practically everything I do", including ambient music: "That kind of free float – these peculiar mixtures of independence and interdependence, and the oscillation between them – is a characteristic of West African drumming patterns."

Early in his career, Eno was interested in both pop music, which he said produces "incredible sounds with great musicians who really feel what they play", and the experimental music of Steve Reich, Cornelius Cardew, John Cage and Gavin Bryars. However, he disliked how experimental composers such as Reich performed and recorded music, which he described as "stiffly played and badly recorded". Eno sought to combine experimental music processes with the "results-oriented" world of pop. In 1974, Eno said he strove for a meeting between avant-garde music, which is "fiercely intellectual, fiercely anti-physical", and rock music, which is "fiercely physical and fiercely anti-intellectual". According to Linda Kohanov of AllMusic, Eno "was in part striving to create music that approximated the effect of visual art".

=== Ambient music ===
While inspired by minimalist composers including John Cage, Terry Riley, Steve Reich and Erik Satie, Eno coined the term ambient music to describe his own work. The Ambient Music Guide states that Eno brought from "relative obscurity into the popular consciousness" fundamental ideas about ambient music, including "the idea of modern music as subtle atmosphere, as chill-out, as impressionistic, as something that creates space for quiet reflection or relaxation". In 2002, Mark Richardson wrote in Pitchfork that ambient music remained associated with Eno: "Rarely has a genre, indeed an entire musical idea, been so completely owned by a single individual ... For all practical purposes, Brian Eno is ambient music." According to Linda Kohanov of AllMusic, Eno "was in part striving to create music that approximated the effect of visual art".

Eno's work in ambient music is sometimes credited for leading to new age music. In 1989, he said he generally disliked it: "There is more bad than good because of the mindless use of electronics that current technology has given birth to — it has become very easy for anyone to produce a tape of blurring noises mixed with 'pretty' sounds and call it new age. I realise I am partly responsible for this and regret the misunderstanding."

=== Generative music ===
Eno cited wind chimes as an example of generative music.

Eno coined the term "generative music" to describe music that emerges randomly through conditions created by the composer. He gave the example of wind chimes: the creator of the chimes determines their number, pitches and material, but how and when they strike is determined randomly by the wind. The creator did not compose the music generated by the chimes, but instead built the system from which music emerges.

Eno became interested in such processes in the 1960s after hearing composers such as Terry Riley, and began experimenting with tape loops. He said he found it exciting to "lose control" of the music: "You'd then feed inputs into it, and it would reconfigure it and make something beyond what you had predicted." He cited his albums Discreet Music (1975) and Ambient 1: Music for Airports (1979) as early examples of generative music systems. Eno worked with software developers to create generative music applications, such as Koan and Bloom.

=== Equipment ===
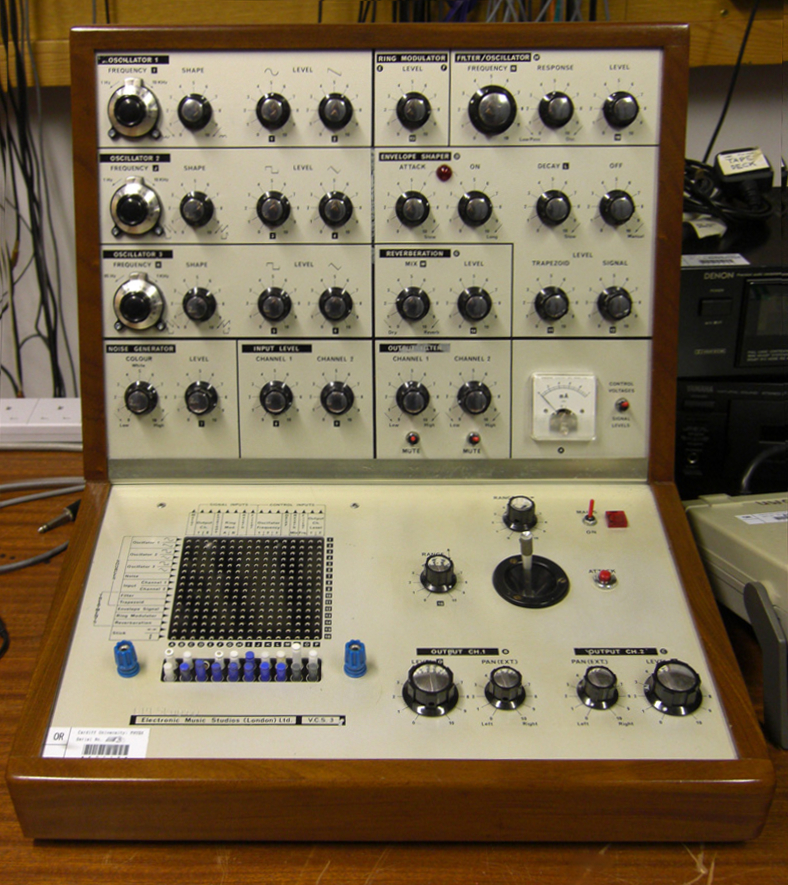
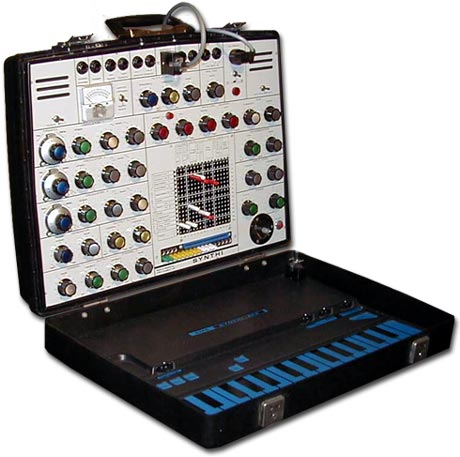

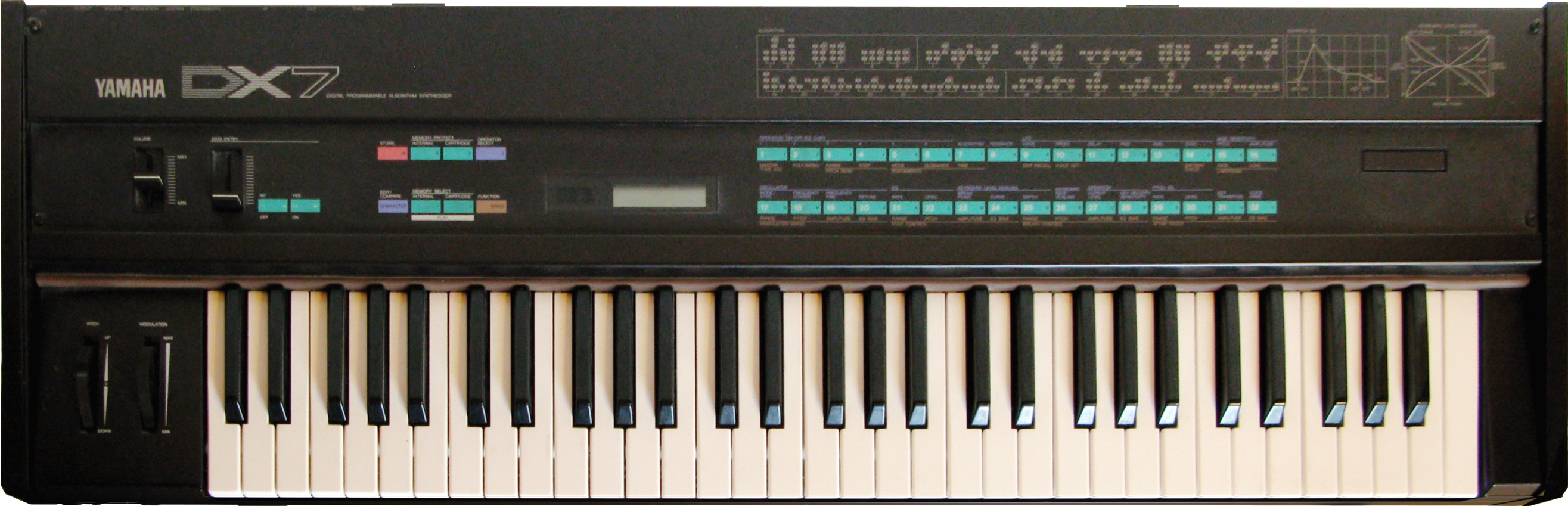
Synthesisers used by Eno. From top: EMS VCS 3, EMS Synthi AKS, Yamaha DX7

Eno said he enjoyed discovering how technology could be put to purposes beyond the designer's intention, citing distortion as an example. Eno felt that whereas traditional instruments, such as pianos, are tied to cultural convention and musical history, he found newer instruments such as synthesisers freeing: "You're designing a new instrument ... It's a constantly unfinished instrument. You finish it when you tweak it, and play around with it, and decide how to use it. You can combine a number of cultural references into one new thing." He did not note down his synthesiser settings for fear of falling into habits.

He enjoys working with complex equipment, as this creates a complex and rich sound that suggests a mood. In the 1970s, Eno's primary instrument was the tape recorder; he once owned 31. In the late 1960s or early 1970s, Eno purchased a Starway electric guitar that he used on several albums. He never changed its strings, and often processed it with a fuzz effect, creating "saturated wedges of sound". It was listed as "Snake guitar" in the credits of Eno's 1970s albums.

Eno used an EMS VCS 3 synthesiser on tracks such as "Ladytron" (1972) by Roxy Music. He also used it to process live instruments. He used a similar model, the EMS Synthi AKS, on the 1997 David Bowie song "Heroes" to create a "shuddering, chattering" effect. With Roxy Music, Eno processed Manzanera's guitar using his VC3, Sel-Sync multitracking and Varispeed controls, creating unique sounds in an era with limited effects units.

In the 1980s, Eno was one of the few musicians who learned to program the Yamaha DX7 synthesiser in depth, and used it to create ambient music on his 1983 album Apollo: Atmospheres and Soundtracks. He shared instructions for recreating his DX7 sounds in a 1987 issue of Keyboard, and used the DX7 on records he produced by U2 and Coldplay. As of 2022, Eno mostly used software synthesisers with Logic Pro.

Eno and Tony Visconti used the Eventide H910 Harmoniser, a pitch-shifting unit, on Bowie's Berlin Trilogy in the 1970s. Eno wrote to Eventide saying their updated 1986 model was the best-designed and most enjoyable piece of equipment he had ever owned. Eno was an early adopter of the Kaoss Pad, a sampler and effects unit that uses a touchscreen launched in 1999. He described it as "a way of taking sounds into the domain of muscular control" as opposed to working with computers.

In 1995, Eno said he was sceptical of sequenced music, which "locks music in time". Instead, he preferred human players creating "tension between those moments of lock and those moments of drift ... a lot of things competing for attention and overlapping in different ways, and sometimes miraculously locking together". In 2025, Eno said he valued the convenience of modern recording technology but worried it created "super-pasteurised music where everything has been nicely finished and ironed out, and there's no fibre left at all". He cited the pitch-correcting software AutoTune, saying: "I love the sound of AutoTune when it's used for what it can do that human voices can't do; I hate the sound of it when it just turns a voice into every other voice."

== Influence ==
Eno is frequently referred to as one of popular music's most influential artists. In 2025, the GQ writer Grayson Haver Currin wrote that Eno "has built one of the most impressive résumés of any musician, artist, or thinker since the arrival of rock and roll ... Turn on rock radio or launch the meditation app on your phone: you will soon hear something Eno has made, touched, graced, or inspired." The musician and producer Jon Brion described him as the most influential artist since the Beatles. Critic Jason Ankeny of AllMusic argued that Eno "forever altered the ways in which music is approached, composed, performed, and perceived, and everything from punk to techno to new age bears his unmistakable influence". He has influenced genres including acid house, ambient house, jungle, krautrock, dubstep and techno. Mark Richardson of Pitchfork wrote that Eno's "dual role in experimental and popular music is without precedent, and his influence on the music scene as a whole is difficult to overstate".

The Guardian critic Rob Fitzpatrick wrote that "by circumventing the norms in song structure and melodic progression, [Eno] changed the way we hear and process music by other others". Eno's early albums, with songs such as "Blank Frank" and "Third Uncle", influenced gothic rock and "provided the entire blueprint" for Warsaw, later known as Joy Division. The Icelandic singer Björk credited Eno as a primary influence. James Murphy of LCD Soundsystem described Eno's work with Bowie in the 1970s as a major influence. The Pink Floyd keyboardist, Rick Wright, said he "often eulogised" Eno's abilities. MGMT named a song after Eno on their 2010 album Congratulations.

Eno met Fred Gibson, also known as Fred Again, at a singing group organised by Eno and became his mentor. Eno said he learnt about contemporary music from watching Gibson work: "It's a two-way relationship. I'm very flattered to be called a mentor of someone whose work I like a lot, but actually, it worked both ways round. I started listening to music differently when I watched how Fred was making it." Eno dislikes discussing his past work, saying: "It's all designed to reinforce the idea that artists are somehow otherworldly beings who exist on a different plane."

== Accolades and honours ==
Rolling Stone's 2023 list of the 500 greatest albums includes Eno's albums Here Come the Warm Jets and Another Green World, plus several Eno produced or contributed to: For Your Pleasure by Roxy Music, Q: Are We Not Men? A: We Are Devo! by Devo, More Songs About Buildings and Food and Remain in Light by Talking Heads, Achtung Baby and The Joshua Tree by U2 and Low by David Bowie.

In 1995, Eno received honorary doctorates from Plymouth University and the Royal College of Art, London. Eno won the Brit Award for British Producer of the Year in 1994 and again in 1996. Berlin University of the Arts appointed him honorary professor in 1998. By the mid-1990s, Eno had earned the nickname "Professor Eno" in the press.

In 2007, Eno declined to become a Commander of the Order of the British Empire, and did not discuss his reasons. He won the Music Producers Guild trophy in 2009. He was appointed a Royal Designer for Industry in 2012. In 2016, he was added to Edinburgh University's roll of honour. In 2017, Eno delivered the Andrew Carnegie Lecture at Edinburgh University. In 2019, he was awarded the Stephen Hawking Medal for Science Communication from the Starmus Festival. That March, Eno was inducted into the Rock and Roll Hall of Fame as a member of Roxy Music.

In 2011, Belgian academics from the Royal Museum for Central Africa named a species of Afrotropical spider Pseudocorinna brianeno in Eno's honour. The asteroid 81948 Eno, discovered by Marc Buie at Cerro Tololo in 2000, was named after Eno. The official naming citation was published by the Minor Planet Center on 18 May 2019 (M.P.C. 114955).

== Politics and activism ==
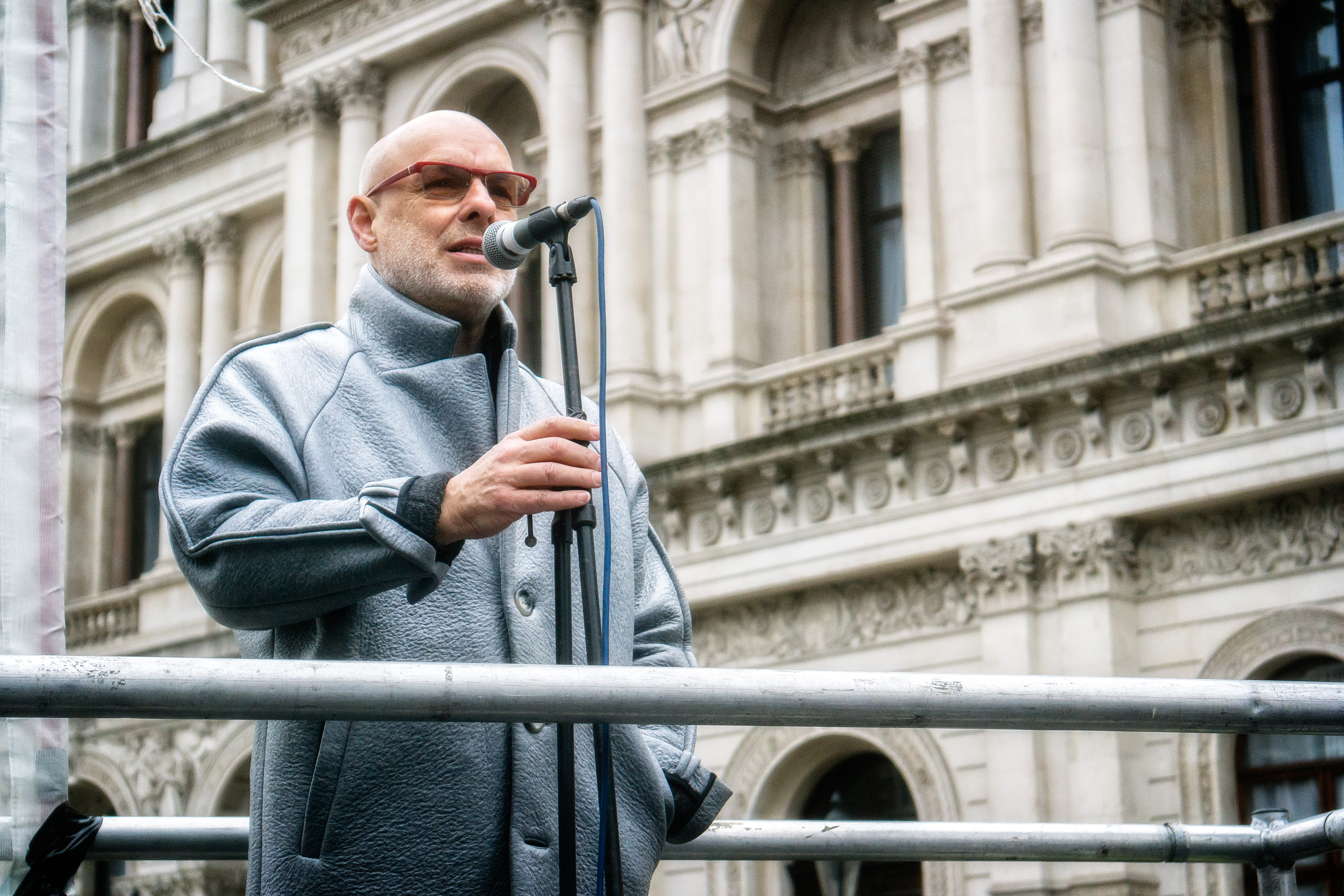
Eno in 2015 at a Stop the War anti-war advocacy protest at Whitehall, London

Eno voted for Labour in every election until the Iraq War, after which he voted for the Liberal Democrats in the 2005 and 2010 general elections. Ahead of the 2005 election, Eno launched a campaign urging public figures to support the Liberal Democrats. Eno said he wanted to break down the UK's two-party politics. In 2007, Eno joined the Liberal Democrats as youth adviser under the leader, Nick Clegg.

In August 2015, Eno endorsed Jeremy Corbyn for the Labour Party leadership election. He said at a rally in Camden Town Hall: "I don't think electability really is the most important thing. What's important is that someone changes the conversation and moves us off this small-minded agenda." He later wrote in The Guardian that Corbyn had "been doing this with courage and integrity and with very little publicity. This already distinguishes him from at least half the people in Westminster, whose strongest motivation seems to have been to get elected, whatever it takes." Eno opposed Brexit. Following the Brexit referendum in 2016, Eno was one of several British musicians who signed a letter to the prime minister, Theresa May, calling for a second referendum.

In November 2019, along with other public figures, Eno signed a letter supporting Corbyn, describing him as "a beacon of hope in the struggle against emergent far-right nationalism, xenophobia and racism in much of the democratic world" and endorsed him for in the 2019 UK general election. In December 2019, along with 42 other leading cultural figures, Eno signed a letter endorsing the Labour Party under Corbyn's leadership in the 2019 general election. The letter stated that "Labour's election manifesto under Jeremy Corbyn's leadership offers a transformative plan that prioritises the needs of people and the planet over private profit and the vested interests of a few."

=== Support for Palestine ===
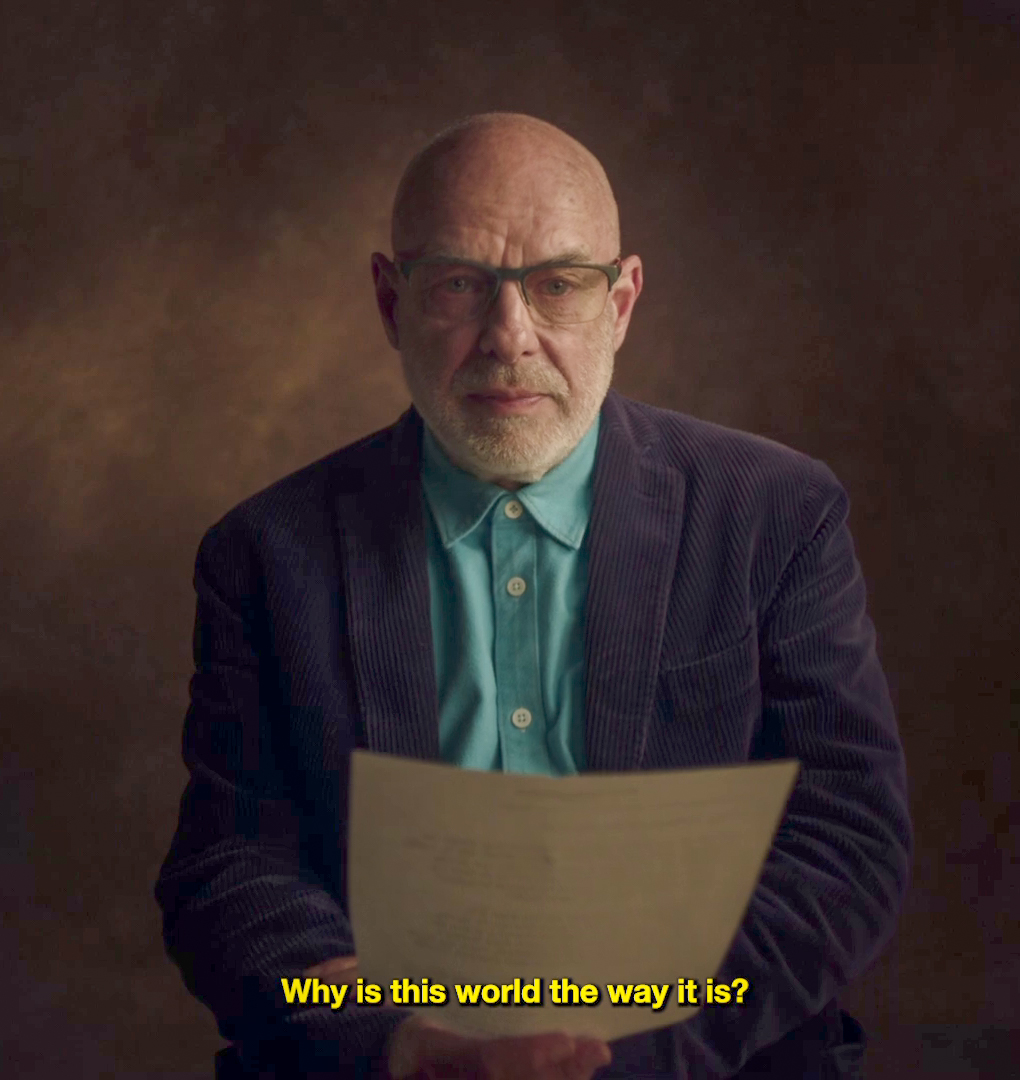
Eno participating in a plea to end the Gaza genocide in 2024

In 2006, Eno was one of more than 100 artists and writers who signed an open letter calling for an international boycott of Israeli political and cultural institutions. In January 2009, he spoke out against Israel's military action on the Gaza Strip by writing an opinion for CounterPunch and participating in a large-scale protest in London. In 2014, Eno protested against what he called a "one-sided exercise in ethnic cleansing" and a "war [with] no moral justification", in reference to the 2014 military operation of Israel into Gaza. Along with Archbishop Desmond Tutu, Noam Chomsky, Alice Walker and others, Eno signed a letter published in The Guardian calling the conflict an "inhumane and illegal act of military aggression" and called for a military embargo on Israel similar to that imposed on South Africa during apartheid.

Eno is a supporter of Boycott, Divestment and Sanctions movement, which asks artists to boycott Israel. In April 2021, Eno was a participant in the "Live for Gaza", online concert which was held in April. 2021 Artists from Gaza included Gaza's first rock group Osprey V, Wafaa Alnjeili, and Badeel Band. In October 2023, Eno signed an open letter of artists calling for a ceasefire during the Israeli bombardment of Gaza. In November 2023, he signed an open letter calling for a ceasefire and an end to Israel's blockade of the Gaza Strip.

In April 2024, Eno was one of 130 public figures to sign a letter to the Court of Appeal in support of the British direct action group Palestine Action after they were banned as a terrorist organisation. In May 2025, Eno accused Microsoft of complicity in Israeli war crimes in the Gaza war for providing Israel with AI and cloud services. He pledged to donate his fee for the Windows 95 Microsoft Sound to the victims in Gaza. He was also one of 380 public figures and groups to sign a letter declaring the Gaza war a genocide and calling for a ceasefire. That September, Eno organised and performed at the Together for Palestine benefit concert at Wembley Arena, London. It raised over $2 million for Palestinian charities. That month, he signed an open pledge with Film Workers for Palestine, pledging not to work with Israeli film institutions "that are implicated in genocide and apartheid against the Palestinian people". In April 2026, Eno signed a letter organised by No Music for Genocide calling for Israel to be banned from that year's Eurovision Song Contest.

=== Climate ===
In the late 2010s, Eno decided to reduce his flying to reduce his carbon footprint. In 2021, Eno co-founded the charity EarthPercent, which asks members of the music industry to pledge a small percent of its income to projects halting climate change. Its advisory panel includes the climate scientist Tamsin Edwards, the physicist Brian Cox and the activist Tori Tsui. In August 2026, Eno was among 211 artists to sign a letter calling for the prime minister, Andy Burnham, to reject proposals for further drilling in the Rosebank oil and gas field.

=== Other issues ===
In 1996, Eno and others started the Long Now Foundation to educate the public about the very long-term future of society and to encourage long-term thinking in the exploration of enduring solutions to global issues. In 2013, Eno became a patron of Videre est Credere, a UK human rights charity. Videre gives activists equipment and training to training to capture video evidence of human rights violations. Eno participates alongside the film producers Uri Fruchtmann and Terry Gilliam and executive director of Greenpeace UK John Sauven.

Eno was appointed president of the Stop the War Coalition in 2017. He has had a long involvement with the organisation since it was set up in 2001. Eno is also a trustee of the environmental law charity ClientEarth, Somerset House, and the Institute for Innovation and Public Purpose, set up by Mariana Mazzucato.

In 2025, Eno said social media had been simultaneously useful and catastrophic, and had had an "toxic" effect on politics. While he said he welcomes new technology, he expressed concern that AI, like social media, was owned by a small number of people motivated by profit. Eno is an early and prominent member of Democracy in Europe Movement 2025 (DiEM25), where he contributes, issues statements, and takes part in media events and discussions. According to a 2025 profile in GQ, Eno had begun giving away most of his life earnings. In July 2026, Eno was among 120 people who wrote an open letter organised by Patriotic Millionaires to the prime minister, Andy Burnham, asking to be taxed more.

== Personal life ==
In March 1967, at the age of 18, Eno married Sarah Grenville. They had a daughter, Hannah Louise (born 1967), and separated by 1969. They did not divorce until the 1980s. During his time living in Manhattan in the late 1970s and early 1980s, Eno lived with his girlfriend, Alex Blair, in a loft apartment on Broome Street. In 1988, Eno married his manager, Anthea Norman-Taylor. They have two daughters, Irial Violet (born 1990) and Darla Joy (born 1991).

Raised Catholic, Eno described himself as "kind of an evangelical atheist" but has also professed an interest in religion. In 1991, Eno appeared on BBC Radio 4's Desert Island Discs. His choices included "Lord Don't Forget About Me" by Dorothy Love Coates and "Too Much Time" by Captain Beefheart & His Magic Band. His chosen book was Contingency, Irony, and Solidarity by Richard Rorty and his luxury item was a radio telescope. As of 2008, Eno lived in Oxfordshire, near Abingdon. As of 2025, he was living in Norfolk and had a studio in Notting Hill, London. For years, Eno has held a community chorus in his studio for friends and neighbours, singing country, pop, and gospel. Attendees have included Paul McCartney, Annie Lennox, Will Champion and Beatie Wolfe.

== Selected discography ==
This is an incomplete list.

Solo studio albums

- Here Come the Warm Jets (Island, 1974)
- Taking Tiger Mountain (By Strategy) (Island, 1974)
- Another Green World (Island, 1975)
- Discreet Music (Obscure, 1975)
- Before and After Science (Polydor, 1977)
- Ambient 1: Music for Airports (Polydor, 1978)
- Music for Films (Polydor, 1978)
- Ambient 4: On Land (E.G., 1982)
- Apollo: Atmospheres and Soundtracks (E.G., 1983)
- Thursday Afternoon (E.G., 1985)
- Nerve Net (Opal/All Saints, 1992)
- The Shutov Assembly (Opal/All Saints, 1992)
- Neroli (Opal/All Saints, 1993)
- Headcandy (BMG, 1994)
- The Drop (All Saints, 1997)
- Another Day on Earth (Hannibal, 2005)
- Lux (Warp, 2012)
- The Ship (Warp, 2016)
- Reflection (Warp, 2017)
- ForeverAndEverNoMore (Verve/UMC, 2022)
- Aurum (Opal, 2025)

Ambient installation albums

- Extracts from Music for White Cube, London 1997 (Opal, 1997)
- Lightness: Music for the Marble Palace (Opal, 1997)
- I Dormienti (Opal, 1999)
- Kite Stories (Opal, 1999)
- Music for Civic Recovery Centre (Opal, 2000)
- Compact Forest Proposal (Opal, 2001)
- January 07003: Bell Studies for the Clock of the Long Now (Opal, 2003)

== Books written ==
- Eno, Brian; Mills, Russell; Poynor, Rick (1986). More Dark Than Shark. London: Faber and Faber. ISBN 978-0571138838.
- Eno, Brian (1996). A Year with Swollen Appendices: Brian Eno's Diary. London: Faber and Faber. ISBN 9780571179954.
- Eno, Brian; Paladino, Mimmo (2000). I Dormienti. A. Cetti Serbelloni. ISBN 978-8888098005. Limited edition of 2000 copies.
- Eno, Brian; Adriaanse, Bette (2025). What Art Does: An Unfinished Theory. Faber & Faber. ISBN 978-0571395514.

== See also ==
- List of ambient music artists
- List of atheists in music
- List of British Grammy Award winners and nominees
- List of people who have declined a British honour
