= Headcandy =

'Headcandy' is the name given to a series of kaleidoscopic, psychedelic videos, DVDs and CD-ROMs created by Chris Juul and Doug Jipson. The first volume was called Video Kaleidoscope, the second was called Headcandy with music from Brian Eno, the third, Sidney's Psychedelic Adventure and the fourth Psychedelic Headcandy.

The concept of Headcandy is kaleidoscopic, psychedelic visuals set to music and viewed while wearing a 3-D style pair of prismatic glasses. The film covering the lenses of the glasses refracts white light into a prism of color. When viewing Headcandy in a dark room it turns the monitor into a gigantic wall of color kaleidoscopic visuals.

Each program is approximately 60 minutes in length.

In the first Headcandy the music was composed by Michael Brown. It was released on VHS video tape and Laser Disc. The label was Pacific Arts, Mike Nesmith's company.
