= Osprey V =

Palestinian rock band

- Origin: Gaza
- Genre: Hard rock
- Years active: 2017 - present
- Members: Raji Al Jaru; Momen Al Jaru; Sa'ed Al Jaru; Siraj Shawa; Thomas Kocherhans

Osprey V is a Palestinian rock band from Gaza. It is likely that they are the first musical group of their type from the territory.

== Background ==
The band is made up of an accountant, two lawyers, an agronomist and in the past included a Swiss humanitarian worker. The band is led by accountant, Raji El-Jaru. Both he and his cousin Moamin El-Jaru were instrumental in the band's creation. Another member is cousin Saed. As Gaza's first rock group, the band came into being in 2017. They practiced and performed in a studio above an electrical store which was owned by the father of one of the band members.

One of the struggles the band had was coming up against the unfamiliarity that Gazans had with Western Music and the difference that it has with traditional Palestinian culture.

They needed a drummer, and they took on Swiss aid worker Thomas Kocherhans who was currently doing aid work in Gaza. Kocherhans was positively surprised when he heard them because he did not think that such quality music existed in Gaza. He had to leave Gaza in 2021 as his work assignment had come to an end.

In the beginning they created an air of mystery by having their faces covered. They sing about the issue of Palestinians and their plight.

As of 2022, they were managed by Asmaa Tayeh, a young lady who studied English literature at Al-Azhar University.

The group's influences include Metallica and Linkin Park. According to Raji El-Jaru in a 2021 Level Up article by Sahil Sachdeva, he would love the band to be the Palestinian version of Metallica or Pink Floyd.

== Career ==
The group performed one night at the studio that was above the shop and journalist Janine di Giovanni went to hear them play.

Their song "Home" premiered on December 13, 2019.

They performed live in an online concert, "Live for Gaza" which was in April 2021. Roger Waters of Pink Floyd was an attendee. The event was to raise money for artists in the Palestinian territories. Other attendees were Tom Morello from Rage Against the Machine, and Brian Eno. In addition to Osprey V, other artists from Gaza were Wafaa Alnjeili, and Badeel Band.

In 2022, they received support from the Intersticia Foundation, with funds to go towards sound and recording equipment.

In a clip uploaded by the Delia Arts Foundation, dated Jun 21, 2023, the band members talk about their upcoming debut album.

Sometime in 2023, in the period before the war, Osprey V played in a concert hall to an audience of hundreds who packed into the venue. Their shelter in Gaza collapsed during the bombings, and the band recorded their music video Inaudible showing them using a car to record.

According to the Vanity Fair in January 2024 article, by Janine di Giovanni, Osprey V had planned to play in Europe but due to the Gaza war, it didn't happen. Giovanni was on a quest to find out how Raji el-Jaru was. She managed to make contact with him.

According to a 2 November 2024 article by Sky News, the group was concentrating on survival rather than music and their aspirations of playing in Europe had changed to them wondering if they would ever play again. In 2025, Raji and Ash relocated to Jordan. Sa'ed was in Egypt and Momen remained in Gaza.

== Members ==
Musicians:

- Raji Al Jaro – lead singer, rhythm guitarist and lyricist
- Momen Al Jaro – bass guitarist and lyricist
- Sa'ed Al Jaro – lead guitarist, lyricist and backing vocalist
- Ash Moniz – drummer and creative director

== Further reading and viewing ==
- Reuters, August 6, 2021 - Middle East, 'We'll scream our pain': Gaza's first rock band, Osprey V, takes wing By Nidal Al-Mughrabi
- TRT Global, August 29, 2021 - Palestinian rock group sings about life in the besieged territory
  Osprey V, an English rock band in Gaza, sings about life in the besieged territory and wants to
  “send messages of love to the world” instead of “messages of violence and hatred”. Nizar Sadawi
  has their story. #OspreyV
- euronews.culture, 24/01/2022 - Meet the rock band shining a light on the people of Gaza's struggles By Rosie-Lyse Thompson & Ruwaida Amer
- WUNC, February 6, 2024 - The man who founded the first rock band in Gaza talks about his hopes for the future - Interview, Hosted by Leila Fadel (audio and transcript)
- Reddit - Osprey V, a western-style rock band out of Gaza
