= Mixing Colours =

Studio album by Roger Eno and Brian Eno
- Released: 20 March 2020
- Length: 75:15
- Label: Deutsche Grammophon

Roger Eno chronology
Dust of Stars (2018)	Mixing Colours (2020)

Brian Eno chronology
Reflection (2017)	Mixing Colours (2020)	ForeverAndEverNoMore (2022)

Professional ratings
Aggregate scores
Source	Rating
AnyDecentMusic?	7.7/10
Metacritic	72/100
Review scores
Source	Rating
AllMusic	3.5/5 stars
The Arts Desk	4/5 stars
Exclaim!	6/10
The Guardian	4/5 stars
The Line of Best Fit	9/10
Mojo	3/5 stars
Paste	6.7/10
Pitchfork	5.8/10
PopMatters	8/10
Q	4/5 stars

Mixing Colours is a collaborative studio album by English brothers Roger Eno and Brian Eno. It was released on 20 March 2020 under Deutsche Grammophon.

While they worked together on Apollo, this album marks the first time that the brothers have made a full album together.

== Critical reception ==
Mixing Colours was met with generally favourable reviews from critics. At Metacritic this release received a weighted score 72 of 100, based on 11 reviews from mainstream publications. Album of the Year assessed the critical consensus as 74 out of 100 based on 12 reviews.

== Track listing ==
Mixing Colours track listing
No.	Title	Length
1.	"Spring Frost"	4:07
2.	"Burnt Umber"	4:15
3.	"Celeste"	4:22
4.	"Wintergreen"	4:10
5.	"Obsidian"	5:06
6.	"Blonde"	4:10
7.	"Dark Sienna"	3:47
8.	"Verdigris"	4:03
9.	"Snow"	4:40
10.	"Rose Quartz"	4:07
11.	"Quicksilver"	5:12
12.	"Ultramarine"	2:27
13.	"Iris"	2:53
14.	"Cinnabar"	3:20
15.	"Desert Sand"	4:50
16.	"Deep Saffron"	4:38
17.	"Cerulean Blue"	4:05
18.	"Slow Movement: Sand"	4:55

=== Expanded tracklist ===
Disc 1
No.	Title	Length
1.	"Spring Frost"	4:07
2.	"Burnt Umber"	4:15
3.	"Celeste"	4:22
4.	"Wintergreen"	4:10
5.	"Obsidian"	5:06
6.	"Blonde"	4:10
7.	"Dark Sienna"	3:47
8.	"Verdigris"	4:03
9.	"Snow"	4:40
10.	"Rose Quartz"	4:07
11.	"Quicksilver"	5:12
12.	"Ultramarine"	2:27

Disc 2
No.	Title	Length
1.	"Iris"	2:53
2.	"Cinnabar"	3:20
3.	"Desert Sand"	4:50
4.	"Deep Saffron"	4:38
5.	"Moss"	3:20
6.	"Violet"	3:58
7.	"Manganese"	3:17
8.	"Vermillion"	3:26
9.	"Malachite"	4:05
10.	"Marble"	6:20
11.	"Pewter"	4:00
12.	"Cerulean Blue"	4:05
13.	"Slow Movement: Sand"	4:55

== Charts ==
Chart performance for Mixing Colours
Chart (2020)	Peak position
German Albums (Offizielle Top 100)	69
Portuguese Albums (AFP)	37
Scottish Albums (Official Charts)	26
Spanish Albums (Promusicae)	64
US Top Dance Albums (Billboard)	23
