= High Life (Eno and Hyde album) =

2014 studio album by Brian Eno and Karl Hyde

Studio album by Eno • Hyde
- Released: 30 June 2014
- Genres: Art rock, experimental rock
- Length: 43:33
- Label: Warp
- Producers: Brian Eno, FRED

Brian Eno chronology
Someday World (2014)	High Life (2014)	The Ship (2016)

Karl Hyde chronology
Someday World (2014)	High Life (2014)

Singles from High Life
- 1. "DBF" Released: 28 May 2014

Professional ratings
Aggregate scores
Source	Rating
Metacritic	67/100
Review scores
Source	Rating
AllMusic	3.5/5 stars
Chicago Tribune	3/4 stars
Clash	7/10
The Daily Telegraph	2/5 stars
Los Angeles Times	3/4 stars
NOW Magazine	4/5 stars
The Observer	3/5 stars
Paste Magazine	8.4/10
Pitchfork	8.5/10
Spin	7/10

High Life is the second album by the English musicians Brian Eno and Karl Hyde (of the electronic group Underworld), released on 30 June 2014.

== Background ==
The album is Eno's sixth for Warp, and was recorded following the announcement of his first collaboration with Karl Hyde. Eno was quoted saying, "when Someday World was finished I felt like we were still on a roll and I wasn't ready to stop working and get into 'promotional mode' for that record. So I suggested we immediately start on another album, a different one, where we extended some of the ideas we'd started, and attempted some of the ideas we hadn't."

The album was released on 30 June 2014 (1 July in North America) on CD and digitally with a vinyl copy which features two additional tracks, "Slow Down, Sit Down & Breathe" (also on the digital edition) and "On a Grey Day".

== Track listing ==
CD version
No.	Title	Length
1.	"Return"	9:00
2.	"DBF"	4:14
3.	"Time to Waste It"	8:19
4.	"Lilac"	9:24
5.	"Moulded Life"	4:55
6.	"Cells & Bells"	7:41

== Personnel ==
- Brian Eno – vocals, synthesizers, treatments, guitars, organ, background vocals
- Karl Hyde – vocals, guitar, bass guitar, background vocals
- Fred Gibson – keyboards, drums, percussions, background vocals
- Leo Abrahams – guitar, bass guitar
- Marianna Champion – background vocals
- Rick Holland - lyrics

== Charts ==
Chart (2014)	Peak position
Belgian Albums (Ultratop Flanders)	107
Belgian Albums (Ultratop Wallonia)	142
German Albums (Offizielle Top 100)	94
UK Albums (Official Charts)	94
US Billboard 200	194
US Top Dance Albums (Billboard)	7
US Independent Albums (Billboard)	31
US Indie Store Album Sales (Billboard)	17
