= The Microsoft Sound =

Windows 95 startup sound

The Microsoft Sound is the startup sound for the Windows 95 operating system. It was composed by the English musician Brian Eno and commissioned as a seconds-long piece of music intended to evoke emotion. It is likely Eno's most heard composition.

In 2025, the Microsoft Sound was selected for preservation in the US National Recording Registry by the Library of Congress. That May, Eno accused Microsoft of complicity in Israeli war crimes in the Gaza war and donated his fee to non-profit organisations and coalitions supporting Palestine or peace.

== Composition ==
"The Microsoft Sound"

In 1994, the Microsoft designers Mark Malamud and Erik Gavriluk approached Eno to compose music for the operating system Windows 95. According to Eno: "The thing from the agency said, 'We want a piece of music that is inspiring, universal, blah-blah, da-da-da, optimistic, futuristic, sentimental, emotional,' this whole list of adjectives, and then at the bottom it said 'and it must be three-and-a-quarter seconds long'. I thought this was so funny and an amazing thought to actually try to make a little piece of music. It's like making a tiny little jewel."

At the time, Eno was struggling to create music and appreciated the challenge of a specific problem. He became absorbed in "this world of tiny, tiny little pieces of music" and created 84 compositions. He used a Macintosh to create the sound as he had never used PCs. The final composition was six seconds long. Afterwards, Eno was creatively unblocked and found that full-length compositions seemed "like oceans of time". He was paid $35,000 for the composition.

== Legacy ==
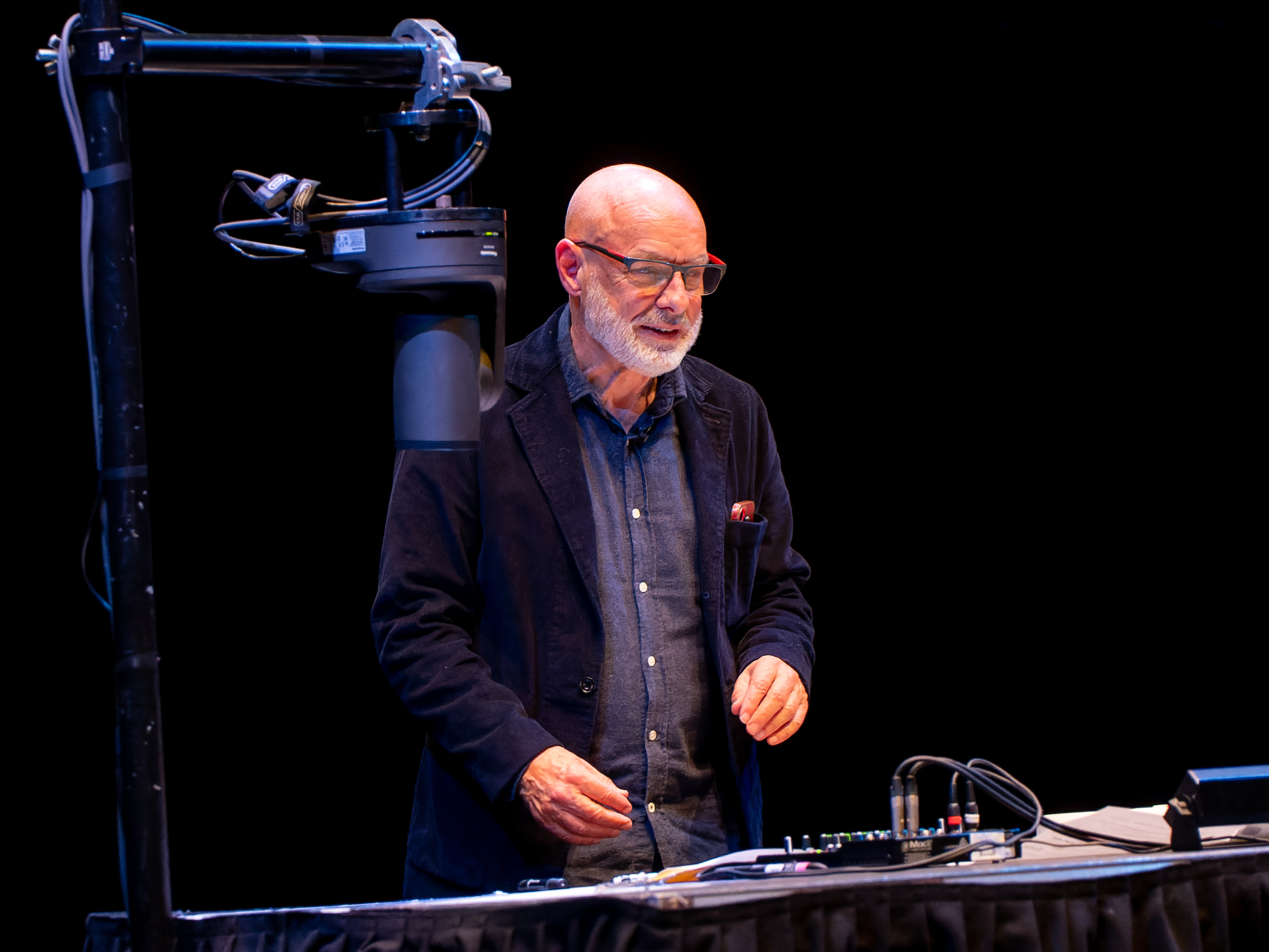
Eno at the Barbican Centre, London, in 2022

In GQ, Grayson Haver Currin described the Microsoft Sound as "a blossom of piano, bells, and hums that evokes the sun peeking from behind a storm cloud ... the soundtrack for dreams of a burgeoning tech utopia". The music journalist Paul Morley described it as "voluptuous" and "a classic example of concentrated miniaturisation".

Writing for the Guardian in October 1995, the musician and journalist Pat Kane likened the Microsoft Sound to the "waking murmur of an unimaginable machine intelligence; bloodless, precise, ending with a discord that hints of different menace ... [This] is what Bill Gates wants the future to sound like. To these ears, it sounds scary and inhuman." He wrote that Eno was "a global huckster of the most skilful kind: using art-values to shroud his deeply commercial intent".

The Microsoft Sound is likely Eno's most heard composition. Pitchfork suggested it was one of the most frequently heard pieces of music in North America, and Currin described it as among the decade’s most ubiquitous pieces of music.

In 2015, the 20th anniversary of Windows 95, the British digital artist Daniel Jones slowed the Microsoft Sound by a factor of 40, creating a four-minute ambient composition. In April 2025, the Microsoft Sound was selected for preservation in the US National Recording Registry by the Library of Congress as "culturally, historically or aesthetically significant".

== Israel protest ==
In May 2025, Eno wrote an open letter to Microsoft accusing it of complicity in Israeli war crimes in the Gaza war for providing Israel with AI and cloud services. He wrote: "Millions — possibly even billions — of people have since heard that short start-up chime — which represented a gateway to a promising technological future ... I never would have believed that the same company could one day be implicated in the machinery of oppression and war ... My new start-up chime is this: stand in solidarity with the brave Microsoft workers who have done something truly disruptive and refused to stay silent."

In an interview with GQ, Eno said: "That’s the most shattering thing about it—the disappointment of the utopianism I remember so well from the '80s and '90s. These awful, dodgy companies seem to be only motivated by money." He donated his fee, which he adjusted to $80,000 for inflation and rounded up to $100,000, to three non-profit organisations and coalitions supporting Palestine or peace, including the Stop the War Coalition and medical services.

== See also ==
- Trip Through the Grand Canyon (CANYON.MID)
