= Neroli (album) =

Studio album by Brian Eno
- Released: 3 August 1993
- Recorded: 1993
- Studio: Wilderness Studios, Woodbridge, Suffolk
- Genre: Ambient, instrumental
- Length: 59:20
- Label: All Saints Records
- Producer: Brian Eno

Brian Eno chronology
The Shutov Assembly (1992)	Neroli (1993)	Spinner (1995)

Professional ratings
Review scores
Source	Rating
AllMusic	4/5 stars
Drowned in Sound	6/10
Pitchfork	8.8/10 (2004); 5.1/10 (2014)
PopMatters	9/10
Tom Hull – on the Web	C

Neroli is the thirteenth solo studio album by Brian Eno, released on August 3, 1993 by All Saints Records. It is Eno's second album to feature a sole ambient, continuous work throughout (after 1985's Thursday Afternoon).

Conceived as a single piece, Eno describes this in the liner notes as fulfilling his ambient prescription: "to reward attention, but not so strict as to demand it". Single notes resonate throughout the piece in a seemingly random but harmonic pattern that shifts quietly for close to an hour. The piece's calming nature is typical of Eno's distinctive "discreet music", premiered with the eponymous 1975 composition that has been implemented in some maternity wards to instill a sense of calm and enhance the organic nature of childbirth. According to the notes accompanying the CD, Eno intended to release a longer version of Discreet Music for just that purpose. Some releases feature "New Space Music", a one hour long bonus track.

== Track listing ==
Neroli (1993 original release)
No.	Title	Length
1.	"Neroli: Thinking Music, Part IV"	57:56

Neroli (2014 expanded edition)
No.	Title	Length
2.	"New Space Music"	1:01:24

Neroli (2022 Japanese re-issue)
No.	Title	Length
2.	"Lighthouse#139 (1997)"	11:11
