= The Ship (album) =

Studio album by Brian Eno
- Released: 29 April 2016
- Genres: Electronic; ambient
- Length: 47:30
- Label: Warp
- Producers: Brian Eno, Peter Chilvers

Brian Eno chronology
High Life (2014)	The Ship (2016)	Reflection (2017)

Singles from The Ship
- 1. "The Ship" Released: 30 March 2016; 2. "Fickle Sun (III) I'm Set Free" Released: 21 April 2016

Professional ratings
Aggregate scores
Source	Rating
AnyDecentMusic?	7.3/10
Metacritic	79/100
Review scores
Source	Rating
AllMusic	4/5 stars
The A.V. Club	A−
Chicago Tribune	3.5/4 stars
Exclaim!	6/10
The Independent	4/5 stars
Mojo	3/5 stars
Pitchfork	8.0/10
Q	4/5 stars
Rolling Stone	3.5/5 stars
Uncut	4/5 stars

The Ship is the twenty-sixth solo studio album by Brian Eno, released on 29 April 2016 on Warp Records. Announced on Eno's website on 24 February 2016, it was Eno's first solo album to contain vocals since 2005's Another Day on Earth. The Ship debuted at number 28 on the UK Albums Chart and is the second highest-charting solo album of Eno's career (after debut Here Come the Warm Jets). The album received critical acclaim.

== Background ==
Brian Eno has said the title is a reference to the sinking of Titanic, which he has called "the apex of human technical power, set to be man's greatest triumph over nature". The album was originally conceived as a multi-channel sound installation, when Eno discovered that he could sing in a low C: "As you get older, you know, your voice drops, so you sort of gain a semi-tone at the bottom and lose about six at the top every year. That's what's happened to me. So I've suddenly got this new, low voice I can sing with, and I just started singing with that piece. And, so it was the first time I thought, "Oh, what about making a song that you could walk around inside?".

== Accolades ==
Publication	Accolade	Year	Rank	Ref.
Pitchfork	The 20 Best Experimental Albums of 2016	2016	—N/a	
The Quietus	Albums of the Year 2016	2016	25	
Rough Trade	Albums of the Year	2016	41	

== Track listing ==
All tracks are written by Brian Eno, except "Fickle Sun (iii) I'm Set Free" written and composed by Eno and Lou Reed.

No.	Title	Length
1.	"The Ship"	21:19
2.	"Fickle Sun (I)"	18:03
3.	"Fickle Sun (II) The Hour Is Thin"	2:50
4.	"Fickle Sun (III) I'm Set Free"	5:18
Total length:		47:30

Japanese bonus track
No.	Title	Length
5.	"Away"	6:53

- "Fickle Sun (III) I'm Set Free" is a cover of the Velvet Underground's "I'm Set Free", from their third studio album The Velvet Underground.

== Personnel ==
Credits are adapted from The Ship liner notes.

- Brian Eno – producer, recording
- Peter Chilvers – co-producer, recording, programming, keyboards, vocoder
- Leo Abrahams – guitar (track 4)
- Jon Hopkins – keyboards (track 4)
- Nell Catchpole – violin, viola (track 4)
- Nuria Homs – voice (track 1)
- Members of the Elgin Marvels – voice (track 1)
- Peter Serafinowicz – voice (track 3)

== Charts ==
Chart (2016)	Peak position
Belgian Albums (Ultratop Flanders)	44
Belgian Albums (Ultratop Wallonia)	91
Irish Albums (IRMA)	68
UK Albums (Official Charts)	28
US Billboard 200	175
US Top Dance Albums (Billboard)	1
US Independent Albums (Billboard)	11

== See also ==
- 2016 in music
- Installation art
