= Kite Stories =

Studio album by Brian Eno
- Released: 1999
- Recorded: Nov–Dec 1999, London
- Genre: Ambient
- Length: 30:10
- Label: Opal
- Producer: Brian Eno

Brian Eno chronology
I Dormienti (1999)	Kite Stories (1999)	Music for Onmyo-Ji (2000)

Professional ratings
Review scores
Source	Rating
AllMusic	3/5 stars

Kite Stories is the eighteenth solo studio album from Brian Eno, released in 1999 by Opal Music.

His shortest album at that point, the music on the album is taken from an installation—a show featuring music and visuals—that took place at the Kiasma Museum of Contemporary Art in Helsinki, Finland, from 11 December 1999 to 6 February 2000.

== Overview ==
An Opal release, with no catalogue number, this title is only available from EnoShop.

The installation included a generative music system and a collection of objects chosen for their spatial presence – stones, sand and light sculptures. The original music was composed of eight layers of sound, each one playing on a CD player situated somewhere in the gallery, the sounds from which were all looped, providing an almost infinite variety of sonic possibilities. The music on the CD, at only half an hour in length, is a very much curtailed version of something that lasted for two months.

Eno made the music in his studios in London. He said:

I think of shows like this as 'music in more dimensions' or perhaps 'music for more senses' [...] a process more similar to painting or collage than conventional music composition. One element in it is nearly 20 years old; most of it was made last week. The music is divided into 8 independent layers, one of which is playing on each CD player. Since these players are not synchronized, the music constantly recombines into different patterns.

The heavily treated, slowed-down & stretched-out vocals on parts II & III are based on a Japanese ghost-story, Onmyo-Ji, by Reiko Otano and was read by Kyoko Inatome, a waitress from his favorite sushi restaurant. Eno said that he "time-stretched her readings using Sound-Designer software, and then re-pitched the stretched voice using Digitech Studio Vocalist".

The stars are faraway suns
In the temple of heaven
Another name for it is
The temple of little lights

The three tracks on this album are also on Music for Installations.

== Track listing ==
1. Kites I – 8:06
2. Kites II – 7:34
3. Kites III – 14:30

== Credits ==
- Brian Eno: cover art
- Special thanks to:
  - Marlon Weyeneth: technical assistant to Brian Eno
  - Catherine Dempsey: organisation (London)
  - Charmian Norman-Taylor: administration and Japanese-English translation at Kiasma
