= Thursday Afternoon =

Studio album by Brian Eno
- Released: October 1985
- Recorded: 1984; 1985
- Genre: Ambient
- Length: 60:56
- Label: E.G.
- Producers: Brian Eno; Roger Eno; Daniel Lanois

Brian Eno chronology
The Pearl (1984)	Thursday Afternoon (1985)	Hybrid (1985)

Audio
- “Thursday Afternoon” on YouTube
- “Thursday Afternoon” (edit) on YouTube

Professional ratings
Review scores
Source	Rating
AllMusic	5/5 stars
Mojo	5/5 stars
Pitchfork	8.8/10
Tom Hull – on the Web	B
Uncut	4/5 stars

Thursday Afternoon is the tenth solo studio album by the English musician Brian Eno, released in October 1985 on EG Records. Consisting of a single 60-minute composition, it is the rearranged soundtrack to an 80-minute video production of the same title made in 1984.

== Background ==
Since recording Discreet Music in 1975, Eno had shown a strong interest in creating music that can influence the atmosphere of the space in which it is played, rather than be focused on directly. The Thursday Afternoon video was conceived as a series of seven "video paintings" which can be looked at in passing without demanding full attention from the viewer. Each of the segments depicts simple imagery that has been treated with visual effects, much in the same way as Eno's music is often made up of simple instrumental performances that have been treated with audio effects. The work was filmed on a Thursday afternoon and named as such.

Thursday Afternoon consists of multiple tracks of processed piano and electronic textures. The layers of the composition are phased so that their relationships to each other are constantly changing in a way similar to his previous Discreet Music piece. The album was also one of the first to take advantage of the (then new) extended running time of the compact disc format, containing just one uninterrupted 60-min track.

== Composition ==
At just one track lasting 60 minutes, the music is ambient: beatless, flowing and ethereal. Remixing and rearranging from the soundtrack to suit the CD medium, Eno stated: "... the music wasn't recorded digitally. It was recorded on a 24-track analogue machine, and then digitally mastered."

An acoustic piano plays a series of notes and simple chords against a background of synths, which eventually dominate the entire soundscape. Though the composition sounds "static", in the sense that its length makes it seem like a solid "lump" of sound, it features many unstable elements that change in both timbre and volume over its entirety.

== Music video ==
The original video, made at the request of and released by the Sony Corporation of America, was filmed in San Francisco in April 1984 and treated and assembled at Sony in Tokyo. Produced by Brian Eno and Daniel Lanois, it features seven "video paintings" of actress and photographer Christine Alicino, a friend of Eno's, and has a running time of 82 minutes. It was filmed in "vertical format," which necessitated the viewer either lie on their side or turn the television on its side, which often proved impractical for many viewers, and it most affected the picture tube's color purity adjustments. The DVD reissue presents it in both portrait and landscape formats so that this is no longer necessary. The soundtrack was recorded at Lanois's studio in Canada and is a longer, different mix.

The content is a series of images that stay static for some time and then slowly move forward, often to pause again. Various video techniques were implemented, such as image feedback, to create a very different interpretation of video and the nude.

Eno himself was aware of the newness of what he was doing. "I was delighted to find this other way of using video because at last here's video which draws from another source, which is painting ... I call them 'video paintings' because if you say to people 'I make videos', they think of Sting's new rock video or some really boring, grimy 'Video Art'. It's just a way of saying 'I make videos that don't move very fast'."

== Track listing ==
Track composed by Brian Eno.

1. "Thursday Afternoon" – 60:56

== Personnel ==
- Brian Eno – performance, mixing, assembly, production
- Michael Brook - mixing, assembly
- Andrew Day - redesign
- Roger Eno - performance, production
- Nigel Gayler - engineering
- Simon Heyworth - mastering
- Tim Hunt - engineering
- Daniel Lanois - mixing, engineering, production
- Russell Mills - artwork, art direction, design
- Carlos Olms - digital consultant
- Tom Phillips - cover art
- Alex Roggero - photography

== Versions ==
=== Video ===
- Released on VHS; Beta (NTSC, cat# 2929); Laser disc; Videodisc (probably bootleg)
  - Japan: Sony, OOZM 70 (VHS) / OOQM 70 (Beta)
  - UK: Hendring, Hen 2 133 (VHS)
  - Germany: Video Edition Markgraph, VEM 101 (VHS)

=== DVD ===
The video has been repackaged with Eno's 47-minute ambient video "Mistaken Memories of Mediaeval Manhattan" (1981) as 14 Video Paintings (Hannibal Records, 2005/2006, HNDVD 1508) (Region 1 NTSC, Region 2 PAL).

=== Music ===
Country	Label	Cat. no.	Media	Release date
UK	E.G. Records	EGCD 64	CD	1985
Germany	E.G. Records	827,494 2	CD	1985
UK	Virgin	ENOCD11	CD	2005
Japan	EMI	68746	CD	2005
UK	Polydor	827,494-2		
USA	Caroline	1518-2		
