= Robert Fripp discography =

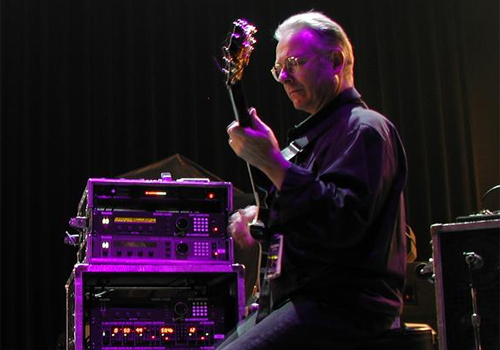
- Studio albums: 4
- Live albums: 7
- Collaborative albums: 28
- Guest appearances: 21

Over 50 years, English guitarist and composer Robert Fripp has been extremely active as a recording musician and a producer. He has contributed to more than 700 official releases. The Robert Fripp Discography Summary, compiled by John Relph, also lists 120 compilations and 315 unauthorised releases (such as bootlegs). This means that more than 1100 releases (including both official and unofficial ones, as well as both studio and live recordings) can be found with Robert Fripp participating. A full list can be found at the location provided above. Major solo or collaborative releases under Fripp's name are listed here, see also King Crimson discography for the group that Fripp de facto leads.

== Solo ==
=== Studio albums ===
Year	Title	Notes
1979	Exposure: Released: April 1979; Label: E.G. (EGLP 101)	
1980	God Save the Queen/Under Heavy Manners: Released: January 1980; Label: E.G. (EGLP 105)	Frippertronics album
1998	The Gates of Paradise: Released: 28 April 1998; Label: Discipline (DGM 9608)	Soundscapes album

=== Live albums ===
Year	Title	Notes
1981	Let the Power Fall: An Album of Frippertronics: Released: April 1981; Label: Editions E.G. (EGED 10)	Frippertronics album
1994	1999 Soundscapes: Live in Argentina: Released: 28 November 1994; Label: Discipline (DGM 9402)	
1995	A Blessing of Tears: 1995 Soundscapes, Vol. 2: Released: 28 August 1995; Label: Discipline (DGM 9506)	
1996	Radiophonics: 1995 Soundscapes, Vol. 1: Released: 18 March 1996; Label: Discipline (DGM 9505)	
1996	That Which Passes: 1995 Soundscapes, Vol. 3: Released: 30 September 1996; Label: Discipline (DGM 9507)	
1997	November Suite: 1996 Soundscapes – Live at Green Park Station: Released: 1997; Label: Discipline (DGM 9701)	
2005	Love Cannot Bear (Soundscapes – Live in the USA): Released: 31 October 2005; Label: Discipline (DGM 0552)	
2007	At the End of Time (Churchscapes Live in England and Estonia): Released: 17 July 2007; Label: Discipline (DGM 0701)	

== Giles, Giles and Fripp ==
Year	Title	Notes
1968	The Cheerful Insanity of Giles, Giles and Fripp: Released: 1968; Label: Deram (SML 1022)	Studio album
2001	Metaphormosis: Released: 2001; Label: Tenth Planet (TP049)	With Ian McDonald, Peter Sinfield & Judy Dyble; Compilation featuring previously unreleased studio tracks; LP, Limited Edition
2001	The Brondesbury Tapes (1968): Released: 01 Oct 2001; Label: Voiceprint (VP235CD)	With Ian McDonald, Peter Sinfield & Judy Dyble; Compilation featuring previously unreleased studio tracks

== Fripp & Eno ==
Year	Title	Notes
1973	(No Pussyfooting): Released: November 1973; Label: Island (HELP 16)	Studio album
1975	Evening Star: Released: December 1975; Label: Island (HELP 22)	Studio album
1994	The Essential Fripp And Eno: Released: 21 February 1994; Label: Venture (CDVE920)	Compilation; Includes the previously unissued four-part 'Healthy Colours' session from 1979
2005	The Equatorial Stars: Released: 5 April 2005; Label: Discipline (DGM 0402)	Studio album
2006	The Cotswold Gnomes/Beyond Even (1992–2006): Released: 23 October 2006; Label: Discipline (DGMLive 1099)	Live album; Renamed Beyond Even (1992–2006) for CD release
2011	28 May 1975 Olympia Paris, France/Live In Paris 28.05.1975: Released: 2011; Label: DGMLive.com (DGMLive 1340)	Live album; Renamed Live In Paris 28.05.1975 for CD release

== The League of Gentlemen ==
Year	Title	Notes
1981	The League of Gentlemen: Released: February 1981; Label: Editions E.G. (EGED 9)	Studio album
1985	God Save The King: Released: 1985; Label: Editions E.G. (EEGCD9)	Compilation album
1996	Thrang Thrang Gozinbulx: Released: 11 June 1996; Label: Discipline (DGM 9602)	Official live bootleg

== Robert Fripp & The League of Crafty Guitarists ==
Year	Title	Notes
1986	Live!: Released: 1986; Label: Editions E.G. (EEGCD 43)	Live album; Co-production
1986	The Lady or the Tiger (Toyah And Fripp featuring The League Of Crafty Guitarists): Released: 1986; Label: Editions E.G. (EGED 44)	Studio album; With Toyah Willcox; Co-production
1991	Show of Hands: Released: 28 May 1991; Label: Editions E.G. (EEG 2102-2)	Studio album; Production
1991	Live II: Released: 1991; Label: Guitar Craft Services (CGCD 002)	Live album
1995	Intergalactic Boogie Express: Live in Europe 1991: Released: 10 July 1995; Label: Discipline (DGM 9502)	Live album; Co-production

== David Sylvian & Robert Fripp ==
Year	Title	Notes
1993	The First Day: Released: 5 July 1993; Label: Virgin (V2712)	Studio album; Co-production
1993	Jean the Birdman: Released: 16 Aug 1993; Label: Virgin (VSCDT1462)	Single; Co-production
1993	Darshan (The Road to Graceland): Released: 06 Dec 1993; Label: Virgin (SYLCD1)	Remix EP; Co-production
1994	Damage: Live: Released: 1 October 1994; Label: Virgin (Damage 1)	Live album; Co-production
1994	Japan Night/Live In Japan Released: 1994 Label: Limelight (LV008)	Live VHS/LD

== Travis & Fripp ==
Year	Title	Notes
2008	Thread: Released: 23 September 2008; Label: Panegyric (gyrcd001)	Studio album
2010	Live at Coventry Cathedral: Released: 21 September 2010; Label: Panegyric (gyrcd004)	Studio album
2012	Follow: Released: 30 October 2012; Label: Panegyric (GYRSP1)	Studio album
2014	Discretion: Released: 22 September 2014; Label: Panegyric (GYRSP2)	Studio album
2018	Between the Silence: Released: 6 July 2018; Label: Panegyric (GYRCD301)	Live album

== Collaborative albums ==
Year	Artist	Title	Notes
1982	Andy Summers & Robert Fripp	I Advance Masked: Released: October 1982; Label: A&M (AMLH 64913)	
1984	Andy Summers & Robert Fripp	Bewitched: Released: September 1984; Label: A&M (AMLX 68569)	
1991	Sunday All Over The World	Kneeling at the Shrine: Released: 7 May 1991; Label: E.G. (EEG 2101-2)	With Toyah Willcox, Trey Gunn and Paul Beavis
1993	The Robert Fripp String Quintet	The Bridge Between: Released: 1993; Label: Discipline (DR 9303 2)	With Trey Gunn and the California Guitar Trio
1994	FFWD	FFWD: Released: 11 July 1994; Label: Inter-Modo (inta 001 cd)	With Thomas Fehlmann, Kris Weston, and Dr. Alex Paterson (all members from The Orb)
1995	Cheikha Rimitti Featuring Robert Fripp and Flea	Cheikha: Released: 1995; Label: Absolute Records (Damage 1)	
1999	Bill Rieflin/Robert Fripp/Trey Gunn	The Repercussions of Angelic Behavior: Released: 9 November 1999; Label: First World Music (FWD 99.06)	
2000	Fayman & Fripp	A Temple in the Clouds: Released: 2000; Label: Projekt (PROJEKT 104)	With Jeffrey Fayman
2001	BPM&M	XtraKcts & ArtifaKcts: Released: 2001; Label: Papa Bear Records (PBCD5)	With Pat Mastelotto, The League Of Crafty Guitarists & Tony Levin
2011	Robert Fripp and The Orchestra of Crafty Guitarists	Chiesa Santa Maria Della Pace Sassoferrato, Ancona, Italy (26 March 2010): Released: 2011; Label: Possible Records (740020)	Live DVD; With The Orchestra of Crafty Guitarists
2013	David Cross, Robert Fripp	Starless Starlight: Released: 2015; Label: Noisy Records (NOISY007)	
2021	The Grid / Robert Fripp	Leviathan: Released: 2021; Label: Discipline Global Mobile (DGMSP102)	

== Guest appearances ==
Year	Title	Notes
1970	H to He, Who Am the Only One: Released: December 1970; Label: Charisma	With Van der Graaf Generator: Guitar on track No. 3 "The Emperor in His War Room"
1971	Septober Energy: Released: 1971	With Centipede: Producer
1971	Colin Scot: Released: 1971 (UAG 29154)	With Colin Scot: Guitar; Credited as "Bob Fripp (Herbalist!)"
1971	Fool's Mate: Released: 1971	With Peter Hammill: Electric guitar on tracks "Imperial Zeppelin", "Sunshine", "Child", "Viking", "The Birds" and "I Once Wrote Some Poems"
1971	Pawn Hearts: Released: October 1971; Label: Charisma (CAS 1051)	With Van der Graaf Generator: Guitar on "Man-Erg" and "A Plague of Lighthouse Keepers"
1972	Blueprint: Released: 1972	With Keith Tippett: Producer
1972	Matching Mole's Little Red Record: Released November 1972	With Matching Mole: Producer
1973	Ovary Lodge: Released: 1973	With Keith Tippett, Roy Babbington & Frank Perry: Producer
1974	Here Come the Warm Jets: Released: January 1974	With Brian Eno: Guitar on "Baby's on Fire", "Driving me Backwards", "Blank Frank"
1975	Another Green World: Released: September 1975	With Brian Eno: Guitar on "St. Elmo's Fire", "I'll Come Running", "Golden Hours"
1977	Peter Gabriel: Released: 25 February 1977; Label: Atco	With Peter Gabriel: Electric & classical guitars, banjo
1977	Magic Is A Child: Released: September 1977	With Nektar: Under Walt Nektroid pseudonym; Guitar on "Train From Nowhere"
1977	"Heroes": Released: 14 October 1977; Label: RCA (PL 12522)	With David Bowie: Also with Brian Eno; Lead guitar on tracks "Beauty and the Beast" and "Heroes"
1977	Before and After Science: Released: December 1977	With Brian Eno: Guitar on "King's Lead Hat"
1978	Peter Gabriel: Released: 3 June 1978; Label: Charisma, Atlantic	With Peter Gabriel: Producer; Electric guitar on tracks "On the Air","Mother of Violence","White Shadow" & "Perspective"; acoustic guitar on "White Shadow"; Frippertronics on "Exposure"
1978	Along the Red Ledge: Released: August 1978	With Hall & Oates: Guitar on "Don't Blame It on Love"
1978	Parallel Lines: Released: September 1978; Label: Chrysalis (CHR 1192)	With Blondie: Guitar on track No. 4 "Fade Away and Radiate"
1978	Music for Films: Released: September 1978	With Brian Eno: Guitar on "Slow Water"
1979	Fear of Music: Released: 3 August 1979; Label: Sire (SRK 6076)	With Talking Heads: Guitar on track No. 1 "I Zimbra"
1979	The Roches: Released: 1979; Label: Warner (K56683)	With The Roches: Electric guitar, "Fripperies" and production
1980	Sacred Songs: Released: March 1980; Label: RCA	With Daryl Hall: Producer; Guitar, electronics
1980	Peter Gabriel: Released: 30 May 1980; Label: Charisma, Mercury	With Peter Gabriel: Guitar on "No self-control", "I Don't Remember" & "Not One of Us"
1980	Scary Monsters: Released: 12 September 1980; Label: RCA (AQL1-3647)	With David Bowie: Guitar on "Fashion", "It's No Game", "Scary Monsters (and Super Creeps)", "Kingdom Come", "Up the Hill Backwards" and "Teenage Wildlife"
1980	Walter Steding	With Walter Steding: Guitar on "Hound Dog"
1980	Miniatures (A Sequence Of Fifty-One Tiny Masterpieces Edited By Morgan-Fisher)	Various artists (Compilation): Contributed track "Miniature"
1981	Fourth Wall	With Flying Lizards: Guitar on "Glide/Spin" and "Lost and Found"
1982	Keep On Doing	With The Roches: Producer; Guitar, devices
1986	Gone to Earth: Released: 23 September 1986; Label: Virgin Records LTD.	With David Sylvian: Guitars & Frippertonics on "Taking The Veil", "Gone To Earth", "Wave", "River Man", "Silver Moon" "Camp Fire: Coyote Country" & "Upon This Earth"
1990	Planet Oz	With Inga Humpe: Guitar on "Heaven"
1992	456	With The Grid: Guitar on "Ice Machine" and "Fire Engine Red"
1992	Water	With David Cunningham: Guitar (and co-author) on "Stars"
1994	The Woman's Boat: Released: 24 May 1994; Label: Geffen	With Toni Childs: Guitar
1994	Lifeforms: Released: 27 May 1994; Label: Virgin (CDV 2722)	With The Future Sound of London: Guitar textures and bytes on track No. 3 "Flak"
1994	Voice Mail (Later re-released internationally as Battle Lines): Released: 17 June 1994; Label: Canyon International (PCCY-00573)	With John Wetton: Guitar
1994	Flowermouth: Released: 27 June 1994; Label: One Little Indian (TPLP67)	With No-Man: Guitars & Soundscapes on tracks "Angel Gets Caught in the Beauty Trap", "Animal Ghost", "Shell of a Fighter", "Teardrop Fall", "Simple", "Things Change"
1996	X: Released: 1996; Label: EastWest	With The Beloved: Soundscapes
1999	Birth of a Giant: Released: 16 November 1999; Label: First World Music (FWD 99.03)	With Bill Rieflin: Featuring Guitars & Organ on eight tracks
1999	Approaching Silence: Released: 1999; Label: Venture (CDVE 943)	With David Sylvian: Vocals and Frippertronics on track No. 3 "Approaching Silence"
2001	The Thunderthief: Released: 2001; Label: Discipline Global Mobile	With John Paul Jones: Guitar solo on track No. 1 "Leafy Meadows"
2002	Strange Beautiful Music: Released: 2002; Label: Epic	With Joe Satriani: Frippertronics on track No. 6 "Sleep Walk"
2006	Side Three: Released: 18 April 2006; Label: Sanctuary Records	With Adrian Belew: Guitar on "Water Turns To Wine"
2007	Fear of a Blank Planet: Released: 2007; Label: Roadrunner / Atlantic	With Porcupine Tree: Soundscapes on "Way Out of Here" and lead guitar on "Nil Recurring" (from the Nil Recurring EP, included on the vinyl album release)
2011	Th1rt3en: Released: 7 February 2011	With Robert Miles: Electric guitar on tracks "Everything Or Nothing", "Afterglow", keyboards on "Deep End"

== See also ==
- King Crimson discography
- Frippertronics
- Soundscapes by Robert Fripp
