= Drifting Intervals =

Ambient music technique

Drifting Intervals is an ambient music technique developed by Czech musician and sound artist Vojtech Vesely, known by his stage name De Moi. His method explores the gradual fusion of multiple musical intervals into a seamless soundscape, creating the perception of a continuously evolving harmonic structure.

== Concept and technical description ==
Drifting Intervals is based on layering musical intervals—essentially, any combination of sounds—through a system of tape delays, where they gradually decay and merge. Inspired by the disintegration tape-loop techniques of William Basinski and the experimental delay systems of Terry Riley and Robert Fripp's Frippertronics, Vesely expands on these ideas by introducing an artificial sense of nearly infinite reverb where sound can travel miles away before slowly returning to you in an altered form. This aspect draws from Pauline Oliveros’ Deep Listening, which explored the resonant acoustics of a large underground water cistern. Vesely pushes this further by simulating an echo in an imaginary space several kilometers wide.

The combination of tape delays and deep reverberation causes individual notes to dissolve into a larger harmonic structure. Over time, they become indistinguishable, forming an evolving soundscape that continuously shifts in tone and texture. New intervals or sounds can be introduced at any moment, seamlessly blending into the main drone, which absorbs them while maintaining an organic sense of movement. This technique results in an ever-changing sonic environment where the boundary between discrete notes and a unified resonance is blurred. To illustrate the core principle of Drifting Intervals, Vesely suggests imagining "random notes being slowly blended, like rubbing different paint colours until they merge into a new shade". - York Calling
