= Exposure (Robert Fripp album) =

Studio album by Robert Fripp
- Released: April 1979
- Recorded: June 1977 – January 1979
- Studios: Fripp Mobile, New York City; The House of Music, West Orange; Relight Studios, Hilvarenbeek; The Hit Factory, New York City
- Genres: Experimental rock; art rock; post-punk; ambient; heavy metal
- Length: 45:28
- Labels: E.G., Polydor
- Producer: Robert Fripp

Robert Fripp chronology
Evening Star (1975)	Exposure (1979)	God Save the Queen/Under Heavy Manners (1980)

Exposure is the debut solo album by British guitarist and composer Robert Fripp, best known as the sole constant member of the band King Crimson. Unique among Fripp solo projects for its focus on the rock song format, it grew out of his previous collaborations with David Bowie, Peter Gabriel, and Daryl Hall, and the latter two singers appear on the album. Released in 1979, it peaked at No. 79 on the Billboard Album Chart. Most of the lyrics were provided by the poet Joanna Walton, Fripp's partner at the time, who also coined the term "Frippertronics" to describe his tape looping system.

== Background ==
After terminating the first run of King Crimson in 1974, studying at the International Academy for Continuous Education through 1975-1976 and assisting Peter Gabriel in both studio and stage capacities, Fripp moved in 1977 to the Hell's Kitchen neighbourhood of New York City. New York was then a centre of punk rock and what would come to be known as new wave, and Fripp became part of the scene, playing and recording with Blondie and the Roche sisters, absorbing the sounds of the active downtown music scene. He envisioned a new approach, and incorporated elements of these NYC experiences into his current palette, including "Frippertronics", the tape-delay/looping technique he had developed with Brian Eno. At Eno's invitation, Fripp performed on David Bowie's "Heroes" single and album in 1977.

Originally, Fripp envisioned Exposure as the third part of a simultaneous trilogy also comprising Daryl Hall's Sacred Songs and Peter Gabriel's second album aka Scratch, both of which Fripp contributed to and produced. Fripp has said his aim with the trilogy "was to investigate the 'pop song' as a means of expression." He continued, "I think it's an incredibly good way of putting forward ideas. I think it's a supreme discipline to know that you have three to four minutes to get together all your lost emotions and find words of one syllable or less to put forward all your ideas. It's a discipline of form that I don't think is cheap or shoddy". The album was to be originally titled The Last Great New York Heartthrob, feature a track list configuration different from that of the final release, and using Daryl Hall as the main vocalist. Fripp instead used only two Hall vocals on his album, substituting Peter Hammill and Terre Roche in various places.

The trilogy did not work out as intended, although all the albums were released. "Urban Landscape" appears on the Hall album, as does "NYCNY" ("I May Not Have Had Enough of Me but I've Had Enough of You", with different lyrics written by Hall). The Gabriel record also features a version of "Exposure". "Here Comes the Flood" had previously appeared with a prog-rock arrangement on Gabriel's first album, but Gabriel disliked the production, and created a simpler rendition of the song for Exposure.

Fripp stated in the liner notes that Exposure "is indebted to all those who took part in the hazardous series of events culminating in this record, and several who do not appear but who helped determine the final shape: Tim Cappella, Alirio Lima, Ian McDonald and John Wetton".

The version of the album that was released, after the changes and compromises that had to be made, was reconceptualized as part of a new trilogy, "The Drive to 1981", marking the beginning of three-year campaigns by Fripp as a professional musician, which would include an album of Frippertronics and one of "Discotronics", to be released between September 1979 and September 1980. Both album concepts were released together as God Save the Queen/Under Heavy Manners, with each concept getting its own followup－The League of Gentlemen for Discotronics and Let the Power Fall for Frippertronics, making for a five-step trilogy. The end of The Drive to 1981 marked the beginning of "the incline to 1984", Fripp's tenure with a reformed King Crimson, originally intended as Discipline.

Fripp's tour to support Exposure was strictly a solo tour, utilizing only his own electric guitar and Frippertronics, and included then unorthodox rock music venues such as restaurants and retail outlets.

== Release ==
The album was remixed in 1983, and this second "definitive edition" was released in 1985 featuring some alternative takes. In 2006, a 24-bit two-disc remaster appeared on Fripp's Discipline Global Mobile label. One disc contained the original 1979 album, and the second disc contained a third version of Exposure with bonus tracks. The "definitive edition" version of "Chicago" is not included on the 2006 version; however, the version of the song on disc two is mostly identical to the definitive edition version with minor variants. A facsimile of that second edition can be created by programming the contents of the second disc as 1-2-3-20-5-21-22-8-9-10-11-12-13-14-15-16-17. There was also a version of "Water Music II" that ran more than 6 minutes. On the 1985 remix, the vinyl label lists the song at 6:10 while there are CD versions that list the song at 6:24. These are the same. The 6:10 timing on the vinyl remix was in error. Adding further confusion, many CDs that list the song as 6:24 on the track list actually contain the edited 3:52 version. The 6:24 version is on some early CD versions, but since the catalogue numbers are the same, finding one remains problematic. It is not on the 2006 remaster, even though it contains the remixed version (it runs 3:55).

In 2022, DGM released Exposures, a massive 32-disc box set (25 compact discs, 3 DVD discs and 4 Blu-ray discs) featuring all four versions of Exposure, including a fourth new mix done by Steven Wilson (in stereo, surround sound, and Dolby Atmos variants) as well as related Fripp albums (God Save the Queen/Under Heavy Manners, The League of Gentlemen and Let the Power Fall, all presented in remastered original mixes as well as new Steven Wilson mixes), live recordings, studio outtakes, the complete Frippertronics tape loops from the period between the start of the Exposure/Scratch/Sacred Songs sessions and the reformation of King Crimson for the Discipline album.

== Reception ==
Professional ratings
Review scores
Source	Rating
AllMusic	4.5/5 stars
Christgau's Record Guide	B+
Rolling Stone	4/5 stars
The Rolling Stone Album Guide	4/5 stars

Paul Stump, in his 1997 History of Progressive Rock, called the album "formidably eloquent" and "breathlessly diverse", adding that while it is conventional in style, it has a remarkable coherence that presages the approach used by the 1980s incarnation of King Crimson.

Rolling Stone said, "all the cleverness boils away, and the music seems slapdash and thin – more like a session player's first tentative record than the work of a ten-year-plus veteran of demanding progressive music. Fripp wrote no melodies. Instead, he handed his vocalists (Daryl Hall, Peter Hammill, Terre Roche, Peter Gabriel) the lyric sheet, played the backing track and asked them to improvise tunes on the spot. This is Exposure's most avant-garde idea."

== Track listing ==
=== Side one ===
No.	Title	Writer(s)	Vocals	Length
1.	"Preface"	Robert Fripp	Daryl Hall, Gabriel (spoken voice), Eno (spoken voice)	1:16
2.	"You Burn Me Up I'm a Cigarette"	Fripp, Hall	Hall, Shivapuri Baba (spoken voice)	2:24
3.	"Breathless"	Fripp		4:43
4.	"Disengage"	Peter Hammill, Joanna Walton, Fripp	Hammill, Mrs. Edith Fripp (spoken word on intro)	2:46
5.	"North Star"	Hall, Walton, Fripp	Hall	3:06
6.	"Chicago"	Hall, Walton, Fripp	Hammill	2:12
7.	"NY3"	Fripp		2:16
8.	"Mary"	Hall, Walton, Fripp	Terre Roche	2:06

=== Side two ===
No.	Title	Writer(s)	Vocals	Length
1.	"Exposure"	Peter Gabriel, Fripp	Fripp (spoken voice), Bennett (spoken voice), Roche	4:25
2.	"Häaden Two"	Fripp	Eno (spoken voice), Bennett (spoken voice), Graham Chapman / Monty Python (Spoken Voice, [Backwards] taken from "Flying Sheep" sketch" : "One thing is for sure, the sheep is not a creature of the air (Baaaah! {clunk}")	2:53
3.	"Urban Landscape"	Fripp		2:35
4.	"I May Not Have Had Enough of Me but I've Had Enough of You"	Walton, Fripp	Roche, Hammill	3:50
5.	"First Inaugural Address to the I.A.C.E. Sherborne House"	J. G. Bennett	Bennett (spoken voice)	0:07
6.	"Water Music I"	Fripp, Bennett	Bennett (spoken voice)	1:27
7.	"Here Comes the Flood"	Gabriel	Gabriel	4:01
8.	"Water Music II"	Fripp		4:16
9.	"Postscript"	Fripp	Eno (spoken voice)	0:40

=== 2006 bonus disc third edition ===
No.	Title	Writer(s)	Length
1.	"Preface"	Fripp	1:16
2.	"You Burn Me Up I'm a Cigarette"	Fripp	2:24
3.	"Breathless"	Fripp	4:43
4.	"Disengage II"	Hall, Walton, Fripp	2:44
5.	"North Star"	Hall, Walton, Fripp	3:12
6.	"Chicago"	Hall, Walton, Fripp	2:18
7.	"New York, New York, New York"	Hall, Walton, Fripp	2:18
8.	"Mary"	Hall, Walton, Fripp	2:09
9.	"Exposure"	Gabriel, Fripp	4:26
10.	"Häaden Two"	Fripp	1:57
11.	"Urban Landscape"	Fripp	2:35
12.	"I May Not Have Had Enough of Me but I've Had Enough of You"	Walton, Fripp	3:38
13.	"First Inaugural Address to the I.A.C.E. Sherborne House"	Bennett	0:07
14.	"Water Music I"	Fripp, Bennett	1:19
15.	"Here Comes the Flood"	Gabriel	3:54
16.	"Water Music II"	Fripp	3:55
17.	"Postscript"	Fripp	0:40

=== 2006 bonus tracks (alternative takes) ===
No.	Title	Writer(s)	Length
18.	"Exposure"	Gabriel, Fripp	4:28
19.	"Mary"	Hall, Walton, Fripp	2:07
20.	"Disengage"	Hammill, Walton, Fripp	2:53
21.	"Chicago"	Hall, Walton, Fripp	2:03
22.	"NY3"	Fripp	2:17

== Personnel ==
- Robert Fripp – guitars, Frippertronics; spoken vocal on "Exposure"
- Daryl Hall – vocals on "Preface", "You Burn Me Up", "North Star", "Disengage II", "Chicago" disc two, "New York" disc two, "Exposure" bonus track and "Mary" bonus track; piano on "You Burn Me Up" and "Chicago"
- Terre Roche – vocals on "Mary", "Exposure", "I've Had Enough of You" and "Chicago" bonus track
- Peter Hammill – vocals on "Disengage", "Chicago", "I've Had Enough of You" and "Disengage" bonus track, "Chicago" bonus track
- Peter Gabriel – vocals and piano on "Here Comes the Flood"; voice on "Preface"
- Brian Eno – synthesizer on "North Star" and "Here Comes the Flood"; voice on "Preface", "Häaden Two" and "Postscript"
- Barry Andrews – organ on "Disengage", "NY3" and "I've Had Enough of You"
- Sid McGinnis – rhythm guitar on "Exposure", pedal steel guitar on "North Star"
- Tony Levin – bass
- Jerry Marotta – drums on "You Burn Me Up", "Chicago", "Exposure" and "Häaden Two"
- Narada Michael Walden – drums on "Breathless", "NY3" and "I've Had Enough of You"
- Phil Collins – drums on "Disengage" and "North Star"
- J.G. Bennett – voice on "Exposure", "Häaden Two", "First Inaugural Address" and "Water Music I"
- Graham Chapman / Monty Python - voice (Backwards) on "Häaden Two"
- Shivapuri Baba – voice on "You Burn Me Up"
- Mrs. Edith Fripp – speaking voice on introduction to "Disengage"
- Mrs. Evelyn Harris – voice

Also credited are:

- Ed Sprigg – recording engineer (The Hit Factory, NYC)
- Steve Short – recording engineer (Relight Studios, Netherlands)
- Chris Stein – design, photography
- Amos Poe – VTR imagery
- Mary Lou Green – hair
- Robert Fripp – handwriting

== Charts ==
Chart performance for Exposure
Chart (1979)	Peak position
Australian Albums (Kent Music Report)	85
UK Albums (Official Charts)	71
US Billboard 200	79

2022 chart performance for Exposure
Chart (2022)	Peak position
Scottish Albums (Official Charts)	29
