= Another Day on Earth =

Studio album by Brian Eno
- Released: 13 June 2005
- Recorded: 2001–2005
- Studios: Brian Eno's Wilderness Studio, Woodbridge, Suffolk, UK
- Genre: Ambient
- Length: 46:50
- Label: Hannibal
- Producer: Brian Eno

Brian Eno chronology
| The Equatorial Stars (2004) | Another Day on Earth (2005) | Beyond Even (1992–2006) (2007) |

Professional ratings
Aggregate scores
| Source | Rating |
|---|---|
| Metacritic | 71/100 |
Review scores
| Source | Rating |
| AllMusic | 2.5/5 stars |
| Entertainment Weekly | B+ |
| The Guardian | 4/5 stars |
| Los Angeles Times | 2.5/4 stars |
| Mojo | 4/5 stars |
| The Observer | 5/5 stars |
| Pitchfork | 6.1/10 |
| PopMatters | 7/10 |
| Spin | A− |
| Uncut | 8/10 |

Another Day on Earth is the twenty-second solo studio album by Brian Eno, released on 13 June 2005 in the UK and Europe through Hannibal Records, and on 14 June 2005 in the US. The album was predominantly recorded and mixed on Macintosh software, using Logic Pro, over a period of four years.

The album was reissued on 16 October 2026 through Eno's label, Opal Records, relaunched that same year after being on hiatus since 1991. (Opal Records does not have a dedicated website, as Eno chose to integrate sales and operations into his existing site, including EnoSHOP.)

Vinyl reissue formats of Another Day on Earth included a widely distributed 12-inch LP on standard black vinyl; a US Independent Retailer Exclusive variant in a limited-edition translucent blue vinyl pressing, with an open-ended run and no published limit on copies, distributed through independent record shop networks like Record Store Day Partners; a Rough Trade translucent mint green edition limited to 500 copies; and a Dinked Archive UK-exclusive pressing in translucent purple vinyl limited to 600 copies.

The album was also reissued as a 6-panel, 3-fold digipak single compact disc. The tri-fold design included photographs taken by Brian Eno during his audio installation, The Ritan Bells, at Ritan Park in Beijing, China. The CD reissue also included a 20-page booklet with additional photographs by Eno, lyrics, and personnel tracking mapping each instrument, software programming elements (Logic Pro setups), and guest performances across the four-year recording process.

Other reissue formats included digital streaming on popular platforms, and digital downloads.

All reissue formats included the 2026 bonus track, “The Demon of the Mines,” formerly issued only in Japanese releases of the original album.

== Overview ==
"Bottomliners" and "Under" were first worked on about six years previously, on a DA88, the latter songs' drumming being supplied by Willie Green. On the former, and on the ballad "And Then So Clear" he pitch-shifted his voice up an octave, using the gender-changing function on a Digitech Pro Vocalist creating a vocoder-like effect. His studio features a selection of hardware including a Lexicon Jam Man loop sampler and an Eventide H3000 Harmonizer.

The album is actually built around the "And Then So Clear" song. He says "... In one day, actually, I pretty much finished it ... I liked it so much, and I thought, how I am going release this song, and I thought, I have to write some others."

On the title track he repeatedly cut up the main phrase, so that "the listener had little windows on it." Similar "cut-up" methodologies were used for the lyrics of "This," in that he used his computer to generate some of the words.

"Under" is a nearly-identical version of a song that was on the unreleased 1991 album My Squelchy Life, which was released in 2014 as a bonus disc with a reissue of Eno's 1992 Nerve Net. It was also included in the Cool World soundtrack album.

For the ambient-style "A Long Way Down" Eno manually synchronised his vocals with an out of time keyboard melody, and on "Going Unconscious" he went back to using Koan generative music software for the textural background.

The distinctions between songs and instrumentals which contain vocals are deliberately blurred, particularly on the track "How Many Worlds": "There's just enough voice in there to make you hear it as a song, making it a bluff, a deceit."

The final track on the album, "Bone Bomb", was inspired by a newspaper story about a Palestinian girl who becomes a suicide bomber. The title refers to a point made by an Israeli doctor that when a suicide bomber detonates, the bomber's bones become shrapnel, adding to the destruction.

== Track listing ==
All songs written and composed by Brian Eno, except where noted.

1. "This" – 3:33
2. "And Then So Clear" – 5:49
3. "A Long Way Down" – 2:40
4. "Going Unconscious" – 4:22
5. "Caught Between" (co-lyrics by Danny Hillis and Eck Ogilvie-Grant) – 4:25
6. "Passing Over" – 4:25
7. "How Many Worlds" (co-lyrics by Michel Faber) – 4:47
8. "Bottomliners" – 3:59
9. "Just Another Day" (additional music composed by Peter Schwalm) – 4:21
10. "Under" – 5:19
11. "Bone Bomb" – 3:09
12. "The Demon of the Mines" (Japan only bonus track) – 4:40

=== Notes ===
Track 7 published by Opal Music, London (PRS) [in N. America & Canada by Upala Music Inc (BMI)], 2005.
Tracks 8 & 9 published by Opal Music, London (PRS) [in N. America & Canada by Upala Music Inc (BMI)] and Editions Outshine / BMG-UFA, 2005.
Brian Eno appears courtesy of Opal Ltd.

== Personnel ==
- Vocals, multiple instruments – Brian Eno
- Keyboards – Jon Hopkins
- Guitar – Leo Abrahams, Steve Jones
- Violin – Duchess Nell Catchpole
- Piano, Synthesizer – Peter Schwalm
- Drums – Willie Green, Peter Schwalm
- Loops – Brad Laner, Brian Eno, Peter Schwalm
- Effects [Occasional Signals] – Dino
- Effects [Splutters] – Barry Andrews
- Spoken vocals – Inge Zalaliene (track 4), Aylie Cooke (track 11)
- Mastering – Simon Heyworth
- Artwork by [Design & Layout] – Sarah Vermeersch
- Photography [Back] – Qin Siyuan
- Photography [Front], Artwork By [Cover Design] – Brian Eno

== Charts ==
Chart performance for Another Day on Earth
| Chart (2005) | Peak position |
|---|---|
| French Albums (SNEP) | 190 |
| Italian Albums (FIMI) | 53 |
| Scottish Albums (Official Charts) | 73 |
| UK Albums (Official Charts) | 75 |
| UK Independent Albums (Official Charts) | 6 |
| US Independent Albums (Billboard) | 32 |
| US Top Dance Albums (Billboard) | 13 |
