= (No Pussyfooting) =

Studio album by Fripp & Eno
- Released: 9 November 1973
- Recorded: 8 September 1972, 4–5 August 1973
- Studios: Brian Eno's home studio, Maida Vale, London (1972); Command Studios, Piccadilly, London (1973)
- Genres: Experimental; ambient; drone
- Length: 39:38
- Labels: Island, EG
- Producers: Robert Fripp, Brian Eno

Fripp & Eno chronology
(No Pussyfooting) (1973)	Evening Star (1975)

Robert Fripp chronology
Larks' Tongues in Aspic (1973)	(No Pussyfooting) (1973)	Starless and Bible Black (1974)

Brian Eno chronology
For Your Pleasure (1973)	(No Pussyfooting) (1973)	Here Come the Warm Jets (1974)

Swastika Girls
An audio sample from "Swastika Girls"

(No Pussyfooting) is the debut studio album by the British duo Fripp & Eno, released 9 November 1973 on Island Records. (No Pussyfooting) was the first of three major collaborations between the musicians, growing out of Brian Eno's early tape delay looping experiments and crystallizing Robert Fripp's "Frippertronics" technique.

(No Pussyfooting) was recorded in three days over the course of a year. Its release was close to that of Eno's own debut solo album Here Come the Warm Jets (1974), and it constitutes one of his early experiments in what he would term ambient music.

== Production ==
Brian Eno invited Robert Fripp to his home studio in Maida Vale, London, in September 1972. Eno was then experimenting with a tape-delay feedback system that he first devised while studying at the Winchester School of Art and further described in a score called "Delay and Decay", published in late 1966. The system had been used earlier by Terry Riley and Pauline Oliveros, who called it the "Time-Lag Accumulator", at the San Francisco Tape Music Center, and by an anonymous ORTF engineer in Paris in 1963: two reel-to-reel tape recorders are set up side by side, and sounds recorded on the first deck would be played back by the second deck and then routed back into the first deck to create a long looping delay. Fripp played guitar over Eno's loops, while Eno chose whether or not to record Fripp's live playing into the loop. The result is a dense, multi-layered piece of early ambient music. This technique later came to be known as "Frippertronics", a term coined by Fripp's then-partner Joanna Walton in 1977.

(No Pussyfooting)'s first track, comprising the entirety of side A, is the 21-minute "The Heavenly Music Corporation". Fripp originally wanted the track to be titled "The Transcendental Music Corporation", which Eno feared would make people "think they were serious". It was recorded in two takes: first creating the background looping track, and then adding an extended non-looped guitar solo on top of it. This track features Fripp's electric guitar as the sole sound source.

"Swastika Girls", which fills side B, was recorded almost a year after "The Heavenly Music Corporation" in August 1973 at Command Studios in Piccadilly, where Fripp's band King Crimson had recorded Larks' Tongues in Aspic earlier that year. The track employed the same technique as "The Heavenly Music Corporation", except that Fripp played to a loop created by Eno on an EMS VCS 3 synthesizer. Fripp and Eno took the tapes of "Swastika Girls" to George Martin's AIR Studios at Oxford Circus to continue mixing and assembling the track there. The track's title refers to an image of nude women performing a Nazi salute ripped from a discarded pornographic film magazine found by Eno, which he had brought to the studio. The album's title was taken from a note left by Fripp on the mixing desk at AIR, expressing "that we should not compromise what we felt to be right".

== Artwork ==
The album's gatefold cover was shot by fashion photographer Willie Christie. Christie reflected on the artwork in 2015: "We hired the mirror from Chelsea Glassware and the zinc 'floor' came from a session I'd just done ... I've always felt badly for Brian [Eno] that he didn't share the credit, since it was his idea and we worked on it together."

== Release and reception ==
Professional ratings
Review scores
Source	Rating
AllMusic	4.5/5 stars
Christgau's Record Guide	B+
Mojo	4/5 stars
Pitchfork	7.9/10
Record Collector	4/5 stars
The Rolling Stone Album Guide	3.5/5 stars
Spin Alternative Record Guide	8/10
Tom Hull – on the Web	A−

Released in November 1973, (No Pussyfooting) failed to chart in either the US or UK. Island Records actively opposed its release. The album was released in the same year that Eno recorded his more rock-oriented solo debut Here Come the Warm Jets; Eno was attempting to launch a solo career, having left Roxy Music, and his management bemoaned the confusion caused by two albums with such different styles. Fripp's bandmates in King Crimson also disliked the album. The mainstream rock press paid the album little attention compared to Here Come the Warm Jets or Fripp's work with King Crimson.

In the UK, the album was released at a large discount and was regarded as a novelty. In 1975, critic Robert Christgau of The Village Voice gave it a B+ rating, calling it "the most enjoyable pop electronics since Terry Riley's A Rainbow in Curved Air" and "more visionary and more romantic than James Taylor could dream of being."

I was told later that, as a consequence of the album, Eno's management decided he was ready to go solo. They thought he had a far more glittering commercial career available to him than working with the progressive rock, left-field guitarist Robert Fripp, which now seems absurd. However, here are the ironies: David Bowie was a fan, I believe, of (No Pussyfooting); and I was told that Iggy Pop, who David was working with at the time, could sing all the main guitar themes.

— Robert Fripp

The album was rereleased on vinyl in 1982, and on CD in 1987 by E.G. Records. Subsequent reception has been mostly positive. Ted Mills of AllMusic gave the album four and a half stars out of five; he praised "The Heavenly Music Corporation" and noted "the beauty" of the "Frippertronics" system, but considered "Swastika Girls" to contain "too many disconnected sounds sharing the space... the resulting work lacks form and structure". According to Eno biographer Eric Tamm, "The Heavenly Music Corporation" "anticipated Eno's own ambient style"; about "Swastika Girls" he remarked that "if it is less successful than the earlier piece, it is because of the much greater overall saturation of the acoustical space. There seems to be a perceptual rule that possibilities for appreciation of timbral subtleties decrease in proportion to the rate of actual notes being played. 'Swastika Girls' shows that Eno and Fripp had not yet understood the full weight of this principle".

Contemporary reviews of Fripp & Eno's 2004 album The Equatorial Stars cited (No Pussyfooting) in a positive light. Peter Marsh of the BBC's experimental music review referred to it as "now one of those albums that's spoken about in hushed, reverential tones as a proto-ambient classic". Dominique Leone of Pitchfork noted that (No Pussyfooting) "didn't really sound like anything that had come before it".

A double-CD 24-bit remastered edition by Simon Heyworth and Fripp was released in 2008, the bonus disc featuring reversed versions of both tracks and a half-speed version of "The Heavenly Music Corporation". The inclusion of the reversed versions is based on an incident where Fripp and Eno sent BBC radio DJ John Peel a copy of the album on open reel tape instead of standard vinyl, and had it "tails out" on what was meant to be the take-up reel, meaning that the tape had to be rewound to the beginning before playing it. On the 18 December 1973 broadcast of his Radio 1 show Top Gear, Peel played the entire album backwards, showing that the "tails out" notice was disregarded. Eno had been listening to Peel's show and phoned the BBC demanding to speak with him, but the receptionist took exception to his tone and hung up on him, and the playback continued unabated. After the second track, Peel said on the air, "I'd like to see what they made of that on Come Dancing... Opinion in here is divided... I think it's great, I really do, magnificent, in fact, in the Tangerine tradition, I suppose, in a sense. Very very good, and well worth having the LP, incidentally."

== Track listing ==
All tracks are written by Brian Eno and Robert Fripp.

Side one
No.	Title	Length
1.	"The Heavenly Music Corporation"	20:55

Side two
No.	Title	Length
2.	"Swastika Girls"	18:43

=== Remastered edition (2008) ===
The double CD remastered edition adds variations to the track list:

CD 1 bonus track
No.	Title	Length
3.	"The Heavenly Music Corporation (Reversed)"	20:52

CD 2
No.	Title	Length
1.	"The Heavenly Music Corporation (Half Speed)"	41:49
2.	"Swastika Girls (Reversed)"	18:54

The remastered edition divides "The Heavenly Music Corporation" into five CD tracks and "Swastika Girls" into two.

== Legacy ==
The album artwork influenced the music video set for the 1975's 2018 single "Give Yourself a Try" and the Strokes' 2004 single "The End Has No End". Electronic music composer Kim Cascone uses the moniker Heavenly Music Corporation in tribute to Fripp & Eno.

== Personnel ==
- Brian Eno – EMS VCS 3 synthesizer, treatments
- Robert Fripp – electric and acoustic guitars

Technical personnel

- Tony Arnold – remastering
- Arun Chakraverty – engineer, mastering
- Willie Christie – design, photography, cover design, cover art
- Brian Eno – producer
- Robert Fripp – producer, remastering
- Ray Hendriksen – engineer

== Release history ==
Region	Date	Label	Format	Catalog
United Kingdom	November 1973	Island Records	LP	HELP 16
United States	November 1973	Antilles Records	LP	7001
United Kingdom	23 February 1987	EG Records	CD	EGCD 2
United States	31 August 1990	EG Records	CD	EGCD 2
United Kingdom	29 September 2008	Discipline Global Mobile	2CD	DGM5007
