= Frippertronics =

Recording techniques used by Robert Fripp

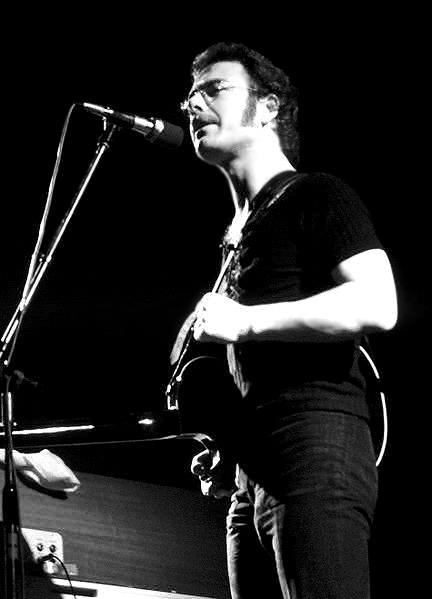
Robert Fripp, on tour with King Crimson, in 1974

Frippertronics is a tape looping technique used by the English guitarist Robert Fripp. It marked the first real-time tape looping device, evolving from a system developed in the electronic music studios of the 1960s by composers including Terry Riley and Pauline Oliveros and made popular through its use in ambient music by composer Brian Eno, as on his album Discreet Music (1975). The effect is now routinely found in many commercial digital looper units.

== Etymology ==
The term "Frippertronics" (or "frippertronics") was coined around May 1977 by poet Joanna Walton, Fripp's girlfriend at the time, for a performance they planned to do together at The Kitchen in New York City.

== Technology ==
Frippertronics is an analogue delay system consisting of two side-by-side reel-to-reel tape recorders. The machines are configured so that the tape travels from the supply reel of the first machine to the take-up reel of the second, allowing sound recorded by the first machine to be played back on the second machine. The audio of the second machine is then routed back to the first, causing the delayed signal to repeat, while new audio is mixed in with it. The length of the delay (usually three to five seconds) is controlled by the distance between the two machines, and the number of repeats is controlled by the volume on the second machine.

Fripp used this technique to dynamically create recordings containing layer upon layer of electric guitar sounds in real time. An added advantage was that, by nature of the technique, the complete performances were recorded in their entirety on the original looped tape.

== History ==
=== (No Pussyfooting) ===
Fripp had first used the technique when Brian Eno introduced him to it in Eno's home studio, combining Fripp's guitar performance with the two-machine tape delay, on the 21-minute piece "The Heavenly Music Corporation" recorded on 8 September 1972 and released on the Fripp & Eno album (No Pussyfooting) in 1973. A subsequent Fripp & Eno album, Evening Star, was released in 1975. These recordings were not purely tape loops however, since some after-the-fact processing, overdubbing, and editing were done.

Eno later told journalist Lester Bangs how he used the tape looping system with other musicians before Fripp, but had been disappointed with the results. Fripp was, as Eno recalled, "the first person I met who actually could use it properly; every other guitar player or musician I met just overplayed immediately. They'd all build up this dense structure that you couldn't work with at all [...] But Fripp immediately understood the use of it". Bangs himself wrote how "Fripp was one of the few instrumentalists Eno had ever met who understood [the importance] of sparse playing when it was going to be channeled through all the echoing corridors of Eno's tape-delay system."

The delay system was first used in live situations for a short European Fripp & Eno tour in May–June 1975 promoting Evening Star, with the 28 May 1975 concert at the Paris Olympia being bootlegged as Air Structures. In 2011, Fripp officially released a recording of this concert as a digital download, along with Eno's original backing loops.

After returning from this tour, Eno released Discreet Music (1975), one side of which features the technique. Eno mentions in the liner notes that "here is the long delay echo system with which I have experimented since I became aware of the musical possibilities of tape recorders in 1964."

=== "Pure Frippertronics" and "Applied Frippertronics" ===
Frippertronics was later expanded to different situations. In what he called "Pure Frippertronics", Fripp created loops in real time without additional editing. Sometimes he rewound the recorded tape, to be played back while improvising a solo on top of it. Fripp used "Pure Frippertronics" to perform live solo concerts in small, informal venues; this allowed him to act as a "small, mobile, intelligent unit", as opposed to being part of a touring company. One such show was in a room at Faunce House at Brown University in Providence, Rhode Island, in a venue built to be a tiered classroom.

Side A of Fripp's 1980 album God Save the Queen/Under Heavy Manners featured "Pure Frippertronics", while side B consisted of "Discotronics", combining "Pure Frippertronics" recordings with a disco-style rhythm section. Let the Power Fall: An Album of Frippertronics (1981) consists entirely of live recordings of "Pure Frippertronics". The standalone "Pure Frippertronics" piece "Marriagemusic" was released as the B-side of a League of Gentlemen single.

There is also a 2-LP bootleg of live Frippertronics entitled Pleasures In Pieces recorded at The Kitchen in New York City on 5 February 1978, containing five tracks (in order of appearance; The Second, The First, The Third, The Fourth, The Fifth, ranging from almost 7 minutes to over 24 minutes. The titles of the pieces are most certainly not given by Fripp. This bootleg has also been issued by persons unknown as a single CD. It is most likely a CD-R recording of the vinyl 2-LP set. Of course Pleasures In Pieces was not and is not authorized by Fripp. The Sound Warehouse recording was issued by Fripp through his Discipline Global Mobile web page, though he makes clear that the recording is an audience bootleg and was not originally authorized by him.

Fripp also used Frippertronics in more conventional rock recordings, replacing what could be viewed as musical parts normally served by orchestral backing. He referred to this as "Applied Frippertronics". Several of Fripp's albums, as well as albums by collaborators including Peter Gabriel, David Bowie, Daryl Hall, and the Roches, featured this usage. According to Fripp biographer Eric Tamm, the first album to feature "proper" Frippertronics was Hall's Sacred Songs (recorded 1977, released 1980).

=== From Frippertronics to Soundscapes ===
In the mid-1990s, Fripp revamped the Frippertronics concept into "Soundscapes", which dramatically expanded the flexibility of the method by using digital delays, synthesizers, and MIDI. Since 2007, Fripp has released several albums of this type under the title "Music for Quiet Moments".

== Discography ==
- 1973 Fripp & Eno - (No Pussyfooting)
- 1975 Fripp & Eno - Evening Star
- 1977 David Bowie - "Heroes"
- 1977 Fripp & Eno - Air Structures (bootleg) live Paris 28 May 1975
- 1978 Brian Eno - Music For Films (track "Slow Water")
- 1978 Robert Fripp - Pleasures in Pieces (bootleg) live NYC 5 February 1978
- 1979 The Roches - The Roches (track "Hammond Song")
- 1979 Robert Fripp - Exposure
- 1979 Robert Fripp - The Sound Warehouse, Chicago USA (DGM official bootleg, 18 June 1979, FLAC or MP3)
- 1980 Robert Fripp - God Save the Queen/Under Heavy Manners (side one)
- 1980 The League of Gentlemen - "Marriagemuzic" (side B of "Heptaparaparshinokh" single)
- 1980 Daryl Hall - Sacred Songs (tracks "Urban Landscape," "The Farther Away I Am") recorded 1977
- 1981 Brian Eno and David Byrne - My Life in the Bush of Ghosts (track "Regiment")
- 1981 Robert Fripp - Let the Power Fall: An Album of Frippertronics
- 1986 David Sylvian - Gone to Earth (tracks "Gone to Earth", "Wave", "River Man", "Silver Moon")
- 1994 Fripp & Eno - The Essential Fripp & Eno (compilation)
- 2004 Fripp & Eno - The Equatorial Stars
- 2007 Fripp & Eno - Beyond Even (1992-2006) (compilation)
- 2011 Fripp & Eno - Live in Paris 28 May 1975 (official issue of Air Structures with backing loops)
- 2022 Robert Fripp - Washington Square Church. Recorded between July & August 1981

== See also ==
- Live looping
