= Discreet Music =

1975 studio album by Brian Eno

Studio album by Brian Eno
- Released: December 1975
- Recorded: Side A: 9 May 1975; Side B: 12 September 1975
- Studios: Side A: Brian Eno's studio Side B: Trident, London
- Genres: Ambient; minimalist; generative; avant-garde; chamber music
- Length: 54:07
- Label: Obscure
- Producer: Brian Eno

Brian Eno chronology
Evening Star (1975)	Discreet Music (1975)	Cluster & Eno (1977)

Discreet Music is the fourth studio album by Brian Eno, and the first released under his full name (as opposed to simply "Eno"). It is a minimalist work, with the A-side consisting of one 30-minute piece featuring synthesiser and tape delay. The B-side features three variations on Canon in D Major by Johann Pachelbel, performed by the Cockpit Ensemble and conducted by Gavin Bryars.

While his earlier collaborations with Robert Fripp and several selections from Another Green World (1975) feature similar ideas, Discreet Music marked a clear step toward the ambient aesthetic Eno would later codify with 1978's Ambient 1: Music for Airports.

== Background ==
Brian Eno's concept of ambient music builds upon a concept composer Erik Satie called "furniture music". This means music that is intended to blend into the ambient atmosphere of the room rather than be directly focused upon. Like Satie's notion of music that could "mingle with the sound of the knives and forks at dinner", Discreet Music was created to play in, and blend with, the subtle background audio of various, or any given, situation.

The inspiration for this album began when Eno was left bed-ridden by an automobile accident and was given an album of eighteenth-century harp music by a visiting friend, Judy Nylon. After she left, according to the Discreet Music liner notes, Eno inadvertently played the harp album almost inaudibly, which "presented what was for me a new way of hearing music – as part of the ambience of the environment". Nylon recalled the event differently: "I put the harp music on and balanced it as best as I could from where I stood; [Eno] caught on immediately to what I was doing and helped me balance the softness of the rain patter with the faint string sound for where he lay in the room. There was no 'ambience by mistake'." Eno related another version in a 2011 interview: "[Nylon] put a record on and then left. The record was much too quiet but I couldn't reach to turn it up and it was raining outside ... I suddenly thought of this idea of making music that didn't impose itself on your space ... but created a sort of landscape you could belong to".

This album is also an experiment in generative composition. His intention was to explore multiple ways to create music with limited planning or intervention. Nicole V. Gagné described the album as "a minimalist work using tape-delay and synthesizer" that would lead to Eno's further experiments in ambient music.

In a 1979 interview with Lester Bangs, Eno called Discreet Music the most successful of his recordings, explaining that it "was done very, very easily, very quickly, very cheaply, with no pain or anguish over anything, and I still like it."

== Recording and release ==
The title track is a thirty-minute piece originally intended as a background drone for guitarist Robert Fripp to play over in a series of concerts. Eno set up a EMS Synthi AKS synthesiser with built-in memory along with a tape delay system, but was immediately interrupted: "People started knocking on the door, and I was answering the phone and adjusting all this stuff as it ran. I almost made that without listening to it. It was really automatic music." The liner notes contain a diagram of how the piece was created.

It begins with two melodic phrases of different lengths played back from the synthesiser's built-in digital sequencer. The signal was run through a graphic equaliser to occasionally change its timbre, and then run through an echo unit before being recorded onto a tape machine. The tape runs to the take-up reel of a second machine, and the output of that machine is fed back into the first tape machine which records the overlapped signals. The next day, Fripp visited and Eno accidentally played the piece back at half-speed, thinking that "it was probably one of the best things I'd ever done and I didn't even realize I was doing it at the time."

The second half of the album consists of three pieces, collectively titled "Three Variations on the Canon in D Major by Johann Pachelbel", performed by the Cockpit Ensemble, and conducted and co-arranged by Gavin Bryars. Bryars later wrote that "the Cockpit Ensemble" was a "catchall name" for the hired studio musicians, as many did not wish to be credited. Eno described the music as the result of a self-generating, self-regulating system, with the input to the system taking the form of two- or four-measure fragments of Pachelbel's canon, and the system being the performers with a set of instructions. Each variation involves a different way of manipulating and overlaying the musical fragments. In the first piece, "Fullness of Wind", the players' tempos are decreased, with the rate of decrease being related to the relative pitch of the instruments, so that lower instruments are slowest. In the second piece, "French Catalogues", groups of notes are associated with time-related directions from different parts of the score. The third piece, "Brutal Ardour", presents the players with sequences of notes that are related but of different lengths. The titles of these pieces were derived from inaccurate French-to-English translations of the liner notes of a version of Pachelbel's Canon performed by the orchestra of Jean-François Paillard.

Discreet Music was the third (of four) simultaneous releases on Eno's new Obscure Records label. It was re-released on the Virgin label in 2004. On CD reissues, a full minute of silence separates the two halves.

== Reception and legacy ==
Professional ratings
Review scores
Source	Rating
AllMusic	4.5/5 stars
Mojo	4/5 stars
Pitchfork	8.8/10
Q	5/5 stars
The Rolling Stone Album Guide	3/5 stars
Spin Alternative Record Guide	7/10
Tom Hull – on the Web	B+
Uncut	9/10
The Village Voice	A−
The 405	8.5/10

In The Village Voice in June 1977, Robert Christgau wrote that the album "encourages a meditative but secular mood (good for hard bits of writing) more effectively than any of the other rock-identified avant-garde music that's come our way". In 1979, Lester Bangs described it as "either the definitive unobtrusively lustrous statement on ambient musics or a wispy treacly bore that defies you to actually pay attention to it [...] depending on your point of view."

Trouser Press described the album as "striking and haunting, filled with beauty and apprehension, paralleling the minimalist music being made by Steve Reich and Philip Glass." AllMusic's Sean Westergaard said it is Eno's "first full foray into what has become known as ambient music," and added that "[the album's] reputation as a groundbreaking and influential work is surpassed only by its placid beauty."

Many listeners have appreciated the healing qualities of Discreet Music. David Bowie listened to it during his recovery from drugs (and led to his collaboration with Eno on Bowie's late 1970s Berlin Trilogy.)

I got a letter from a woman in Cleveland who works with autistic children. She had one child who never spoke; he had never made a single vocal noise in his life. Another one wouldn’t sleep; he was ultra-nervous, in a wretched state. She put Discreet Music on one day, and the kid who had never slept just lay down on a concrete floor and went to sleep. So she went to the group where this other kid was, and she kept playing Discreet Music. And this little child—not only because of the record, I’m sure, though the other one was—started talking. —Eno to Trouser Press, 1982

The "operational diagram" printed on the rear sleeve of Discreet Music inspired for other musicians to experiment with tape delay, such as Thomas Leer and Robert Rental on their 1979 album The Bridge. For the 40th anniversary (2015) of the release of the album, the Canadian music ensemble Contact recorded "Discreet Music" with classical instruments as a seven-part one hour work.

== Track listing ==
Side A

1. "Discreet Music" (Eno) – 30:35

Side B

Three Variations on the Canon in D Major by Johann Pachelbel (Eno)

1. "Fullness of Wind" – 9:57
2. "French Catalogues" – 5:18
3. "Brutal Ardour" – 8:17

== Personnel ==
- Brian Eno – synthesizer, keyboards
- Gavin Bryars – co-arranger and conductor on Side B
- The Cockpit Ensemble – performer on Side B

Technical

- Brian Eno – producer, photography
- Peter Kelsey – engineer
- Simon Heyworth – mastering
- John Bonis – cover design
- Andrew Day – redesign

== See also ==
- Electronic music
