= The League of Gentlemen (album) =

Studio album by Robert Fripp and The League of Gentlemen
- Released: February 1981
- Recorded: July – December 1980
- Studio: Arny's Shack, Parkstone, Dorset, England
- Genre: Art rock; new wave; instrumental rock
- Length: 42:27
- Label: Editions E.G., Polydor
- Producer: Robert Fripp

Robert Fripp and The League of Gentlemen chronology
God Save the Queen/Under Heavy Manners (1980)	The League of Gentlemen (1981)	Let the Power Fall: An Album of Frippertronics (1981)

Professional ratings
Review scores
Source	Rating
AllMusic	3/5 stars
Robert Christgau	B
The Rolling Stone Album Guide	3/5 stars

Trap
An audio sample from "Trap"

The League of Gentlemen is the sole studio album by British guitarist and composer Robert Fripp and his short-lived band The League of Gentlemen, released in February 1981 on the Editions E.G. label.

The music is instrumental, although two tracks contain spoken-word overlays and three tracks, labelled as "Indiscretions", are composed entirely of spoken-word collages. Three further tracks, "Pareto Optimum" I & II and "Ochre", are solo organ pieces produced using the Frippertronics system.

== Recording and release ==
The album was recorded in several sessions during 1980, produced by Fripp and engineered by Tony Arnold at 'Arny's Shack' studio in Parkstone, Dorset, England.

The initial sessions included original drummer Johnny Toobad but ultimately he was replaced at short notice by Kevin Wilkinson, who was in their support band on tour, due to Toobad's escalating heroin addiction. Wilkinson played on all but two tracks on the finished album.

The original album has never been reissued in full on CD, although all but one of the full-band tracks appear in remixed form on the Robert Fripp and the League of Gentlemen compilation album God Save the King, released in 1985. This compilation omits the three spoken-word tracks ("Indiscreet" I-III), the three Frippertronics-style organ tracks ("Pareto Optimum" I & II, "Ochre") and "Minor Man", a full-band track with vocals by Danielle Dax. J.G. Bennett's voice is also removed from "Cognitive Dissonance".

== Track listing ==
All songs are credited to Robert Fripp except those marked ^{†}, which are credited to The League of Gentlemen.

=== Side I (EGED 9A) ===
1. "Indiscreet I" (1:47)
2. "Inductive Resonance" (4:35)^{†}
3. "Minor Man" (3:45)^{†}
4. "Heptaparaparshinokh" (2:03)^{†}
5. "Dislocated" (4:35)^{†}
6. "Pareto Optimum I" (2:07)
7. "Eye Needles" (3:12)^{†}
8. "Indiscreet II" (2:35)

=== Side II (EGED 9B) ===
1. "Pareto Optimum II" (1:27)
2. "Cognitive Dissonance" (3:38)^{†}
3. "HG Wells" (3:25)^{†}
4. "Trap" (4:45)^{†}
5. "Ochre" (3:07)
6. "Indiscreet III" (1:26)

The run-out groove on this side bears the message "THE NEXT STEP IS DISCIPLINE", a reference to Fripp's next project.

== Personnel ==
The League of Gentlemen

- Barry Andrews – organ
- Robert Fripp – guitar
- Sara Lee – bass guitar
- Johnny Toobad (Johnny Elichaoff) – drums on "Heptaparaparshinokh" and "Dislocated"
- Kevin Wilkinson – drums on all other tracks

Also credited are:

- Danielle Dax – vocals and lyrics ("Hamsprachtmuzic") on "Minor Man"; album sleeve front cover
- J.G. Bennett – "Extracts from the Sherborne House talks"
- Tony Arnold – recording engineer
- Marjori – photo of the League, taken at Gramercy Park, New York during July 1980
- Rob O'Connor – "Cover Glue"
- Paddy Spinks – "Strategic Interaction"

== 'Indiscretions' ==
The various uncredited voices on the album occur on the tracks "Indiscreet" I-III and "Cognitive Dissonance". The compilation of these 'indiscretions' is credited to Robert Fripp. They may be classified by their location in the running order of the album, the distinct voices heard and the following opening phrases or sounds:

INDISCREET I

1. "This is addressed to people who have the intention to work" – Voice 1
2. "Rock and roll is about fucking" – Voice 2 and Voice 3
3. "That is the possibility that we should explore" – Voice 1
4. "Can you tell me about your first experience of a nuclear explosion" – Voice 4
5. - Sound of female groaning (evoking orgasmic ecstasy) –
6. - Sound of air-raid siren followed by applause –
7. "There are people who want to know more" – Voice 1
8. "This is not a record which is out to showcase a guitar player" – Voice 5
9. "How do I dance to this music?" – Voice 2 and Voice 3
10. "Then what am I to do about it?" – Voice 1
11. "Don't dance with your feet" – Voice 2 and Voice 6

INDISCREET II

- Features more of the above with emphasis on Voices 2 and 3 extemporising on the subject of rock music. Also included is the complete non-sequitur "I'd like to spend about 100m a year on sewers" and the observation "This country's going down the well" probably sampled from TV or radio. Voice 5 also gets an airing on the subject of Charlie Christian's guitar sound.

COGNITIVE DISSONANCE

- Features extended excerpts about change from J.G. Bennett's 1972 lecture entitled "Concern for the Future".

INDISCREET III

- Features a number of clips of Voice 5 criticising the League of Gentlemen's music and making unfavourable comparisons with a Talking Heads record and a live performance by Television. These comments are interspersed with samples from TV and radio presumably chosen to signify that the opinions of Voice 5 are held to be of questionable value, e.g. "Why should we put up with this nonsense" and "I think it stinks".

Key to voices:

- Voice 1: J.G.Bennett
- Voice 2: Terre Roche
- Voice 3: Maggie Roche
- Voice 4: Sue Lawley (taken from the BBC programme Nationwide)
- Voice 5: Unknown Male
- Voice 6: Unknown Female

American music journalist Robert Christgau claims to recognise the voices of Karen Durbin, Chip Stern, Terre Roche, Richard Goldstein and Ellen Willis on the album, but does not say where each one appears.
