= Evening Star (Fripp & Eno album) =

Studio album by Fripp & Eno
- Released: December 1975
- Recorded: 1974–1975
- Genre: Ambient · experimental · drone
- Length: 47:43
- Label: Island
- Producers: Brian Eno & Robert Fripp

Fripp & Eno chronology
(No Pussyfooting) (1973)	Evening Star (1975)	The Equatorial Stars (2004)

Robert Fripp chronology
Red (1974)	Evening Star (1975)	Exposure (1979)

Brian Eno chronology
Another Green World (1975)	Evening Star (1975)	Discreet Music (1975)

Evening Star is the second studio album by the British musicians Robert Fripp and Brian Eno. It was recorded from 1974 to 1975 and released in December 1975 by Island Records.

== Background and recording ==
Evening Star and the preceding seven-show European tour by Fripp and Eno marked Fripp's first musical output after King Crimson disbanded for the first time, and his last before temporarily retiring from music to attend John G. Bennett's International Academy for Continuous Education.

== Music ==
Evening Star, which opens with the National Geographic-esque titled "Wind on Water," maintains its ebullient tone throughout its first half. But the second side, the almost 30-minute track, "An Index of Metals," shows the sinister side of the duo, with less synthesizer bounce and more iciness. It’s less playful than the first half, and more shocking. It stands in stark contrast to the rest of the 1970s, when others made ambient music that felt allegorically about life and death, the two locked in some eternal competition. Rather than co-mingle the two, Fripp and Eno split them like some kind of fork in the road.

— Matthew Schnipper, "The 50 Best Ambient Albums of All Time", Pitchfork.

AllMusic described Evening Star as "a less harsh, more varied affair [than (No Pussyfooting)], closer to Eno's then-developing idea of ambient music than what had come before". The first three tracks consist of Frippertronics accented with effects, synthesizer and piano by Eno. Track four, "Wind on Wind", is a remix of a short excerpt from Eno's Discreet Music, released a week after Evening Star. Eno had originally intended for Fripp to use the material which became Discreet Music as a backing tape to play over in improvised live performances.

The second side of the album consists entirely of a twenty-eight-minute piece of Frippertronics-based drone music titled "An Index of Metals", in which distortion increases as the track progresses. This side of the album is described as "less playful" and "more shocking" than the first half.

== Artwork ==
The album's cover is a painting depicting La Palma in the Canary Islands as seen from Tenerife. It is a work by Peter Schmidt realized no later than 1970, when the artist abandoned oils and acrylics. It later was to hang in Brian Eno's London studio.

== Release ==
Evening Star was released in December 1975 by Island Records. It was Fripp's only album to be released during his brief retirement.

Professional ratings
Review scores
Source	Rating
AllMusic	4/5 stars
Christgau's Record Guide	B+
Pitchfork	8.6/10
Record Collector	4/5 stars
The Rolling Stone Album Guide	4/5 stars
Spin Alternative Record Guide	8/10
Tom Hull – on the Web	B+
Uncut	9/10

== Legacy ==
Tracks from Evening Star were used in the radio series The Hitchhiker's Guide to the Galaxy Primary Phase. "Wind on Water" and "Wind on Wind" were included on the soundtrack to the 1983 film Breathless.

Pitchfork placed the album at number ten on its 2016 list of the best ambient albums of all time.

== Track listing ==
All tracks written by Brian Eno and Robert Fripp, except "Wind on Wind" by Eno.

Side A

1. "Wind on Water" – 5:30
2. "Evening Star" – 7:48
3. "Evensong" – 2:53
4. "Wind on Wind" – 2:56

Side B

1. "An Index of Metals" – 28:36

== Personnel ==
- Robert Fripp – electric guitar
- Brian Eno – tape loops, synthesizer, piano
- Peter Schmidt – artwork
