= Giles, Giles & Fripp =

English rock group (1967–1968)

- Origin: Bournemouth, Dorset, England
- Genres: Psychedelic pop; psychedelic rock; baroque pop; progressive pop; freakbeat; sunshine pop
- Years active: 1967–1968
- Label: Deram
- Spinoffs: King Crimson; McDonald and Giles
- Past members: Michael Giles; Peter Giles; Robert Fripp; Judy Dyble; Ian McDonald

Giles, Giles & Fripp were an English music group, formed in Bournemouth, Dorset in August 1967. It featured brothers Michael Giles on drums and vocals and Peter Giles on bass guitar and vocals, and Robert Fripp on guitar. The band's music showed an eclectic mix of pop, psychedelic rock, folk, jazz, and classical influences. Music historian Vernon Joynson retrospectively likened their music to freakbeat and sunshine pop. The group eventually evolved into pioneering progressive rock band King Crimson.

== History ==
When the group formed in their native Bournemouth area, the Giles brothers sought a singing keyboard player through a newspaper advertisement. Robert Fripp, a guitarist, responded and was hired even though he was not skilled on keyboards and could not sing. Between late 1967 and late 1968, the group lived in Brondesbury Road, London. Throughout their time at the house, they made many demo recordings. The early demos soon led to a recording contract with UK Decca's newly formed Deram Records division.

In April 1968, the group recorded an album The Cheerful Insanity of Giles, Giles & Fripp and two singles, all of which sold poorly. In autumn 1968 the group added Ian McDonald on saxophone, flute and clarinet, and former Fairport Convention vocalist Judy Dyble. Ian McDonald's clarinet overdubs were added to the single version of "Thursday Morning". Deram then rejected their next studio sessions, including "She Is Loaded" and "Under the Sky". These later recordings have since been released as bonus tracks on a CD reissue of the album. Dyble did not appear on any of the Deram recordings.

On 9 September 1968, BBC Radio aired an episode of "My Kind of Folk" (produced by Frances Line) where Giles, Giles & Fripp backed singer songwriter Al Stewart. Having recently joined the band, Ian McDonald played organ on this session. The songs played were: "You Should Have Listened to Al", "Manuscript", "Old Compton Street Blues", "Room of Roots", and "In Brooklyn". A recording of this session (21 minutes total) exists.

The group continued to record at home; Dyble was only with the group for a short time but did perform with the group on a few songs, including "Make It Today" and demo versions of "Under The Sky" and "I Talk to the Wind". One of the melodies from "Passages of Time" was later reused for "Peace – An End" on the second King Crimson album, In the Wake of Poseidon. A collection of the home recordings was released in 2001 as The Brondesbury Tapes. The demos were made on a high-quality two-track Revox recorder, which was modified to allow for overdubs. Though the finished recordings are mono some have excellent sound which is close to studio quality for the period.

In late 1968, Peter Giles left the group. Michael Giles, Robert Fripp, and Ian McDonald went on to form the first line-up of King Crimson, rounded out by bassist/vocalist Greg Lake and lyricist Peter Sinfield. Peter Giles would go on to appear on the second Crimson album, In the Wake of Poseidon in 1970, and more recently joined with 21st Century Schizoid Band. Dyble would go on to form the duo Trader Horne. In 1970, Michael Giles and Ian McDonald released an album together as McDonald and Giles, on which Peter Giles also played bass.

== Members ==
- Robert Fripp – guitar, mellotron (1967–1968)
- Peter Giles – bass guitar, vocals (1967–1968)
- Michael Giles – drums, percussion, vocals (1967–1968)
- Ian McDonald – saxophone, flute, clarinet, guitar, vocals (1968)
- Judy Dyble – vocals (1968)

== Discography ==
=== Studio albums ===
- The Cheerful Insanity of Giles, Giles & Fripp (1968)

=== Compilations ===
- Metaphormosis (2001)
- The Brondesbury Tapes (1968) (2001)

=== Singles ===
- "One in a Million/Newly Weds" (1968)
- "Thursday Morning/Elephant Song" (1968)
