= Fripp & Eno =

English musical duo

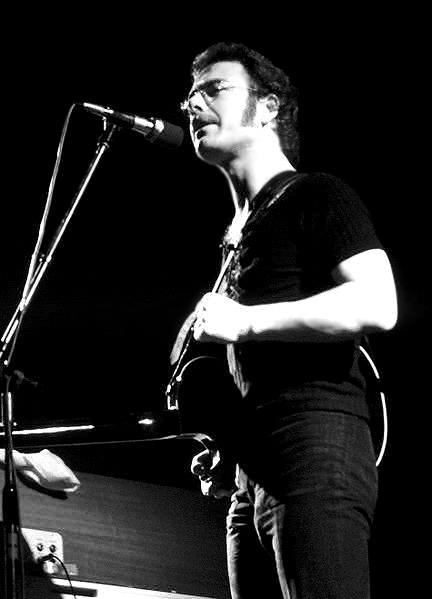
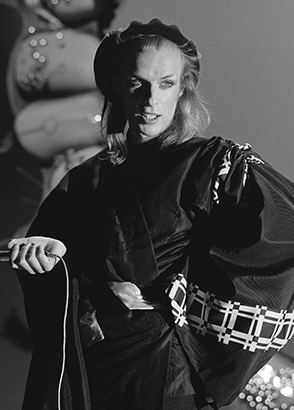
- Robert Fripp and Brian Eno in 1974

Background information
- Genres: Ambient; drone; tape music
- Years active: 1973–1979; 2004–2006
- Labels: Island; Antilles; E.G.; Opal
- Members: Robert Fripp; Brian Eno

Fripp & Eno is a UK-based ambient music side project composed of musician and composer Brian Eno and guitarist Robert Fripp. The duo have released four studio albums, beginning with 1973's No Pussyfooting. The music created by this pair is entirely instrumental and makes extensive use of Frippertronics, a tape delay technique developed by Fripp. Much of the duo's music combines Frippertronics with Fripp's guitar, the Fripp Pedalboard and Frizzbox (with subsequent sound treatments by Eno) along with Eno playing various keyboards, synthesizers and modified Revox A77 tape recorders.

Fripp & Eno released their first two albums in quick succession, with No Pussyfooting released in 1973 and the follow-up album Evening Star released two years later in 1975. Following the release of Evening Star, the duo went on a studio album hiatus, though members Brian Eno and Robert Fripp continued to collaborate on each other's solo albums. In 2004, the duo returned to the studio for The Equatorial Stars. In 2006, Fripp & Eno released the album Beyond Even, which contained material recorded between 1992 and 2006. As of 2025, the duo has not officially disbanded, though there has been no word about plans for new music.

In 2015, Fripp & Eno were ranked No. 17 on Rolling Stone's list of the 20 Greatest Duos of All Time.

== History ==
Prior to the formation of Fripp & Eno, both core members were well-established in the English music scene, and had made significant contributions to their respective bands. Robert Fripp—best known as the leader of progressive rock band King Crimson—had already released five albums with King Crimson prior to No Pussyfooting. Brian Eno had recently parted ways with art rock band Roxy Music after contributing to two records.

== Discography ==
=== Studio albums ===
- (No Pussyfooting) (1973)
- Evening Star (1975)
- The Equatorial Stars (2004)
- Beyond Even (1992–2006) (2006) – also known as The Cotswold Gnomes

=== Compilation albums ===
- (No Pussyfooting)/Evening Star bundle – first released as a Double Pack Cassette in the UK & US in 1975 and later as a limited edition box set in 2008 in Japan
- The Essential Fripp and Eno (1994)

=== Live album ===
- Olympia, Paris, France May 28, 1975 (2011)
