= The Cheerful Insanity of Giles, Giles & Fripp =

Studio album by Giles, Giles & Fripp
- Released: 13 September 1968
- Recorded: 26 February – 18 May 1968
- Studio: Decca Studios No. 2, London
- Genres: Psychedelic pop, jazz rock, Spoken word
- Length: 37:48
- Label: Deram
- Producer: Wayne Bickerton

Professional ratings
Review scores
Source	Rating
AllMusic	4/5 stars

The Cheerful Insanity of Giles, Giles & Fripp is the only studio album by the English band Giles, Giles & Fripp. The music shows a varied mix of psychedelic pop, folk, jazz and classical influences. The songs on each LP side are connected with comedic spoken word pieces, "The Saga of Rodney Toady" and "Just George", which tell stories.

The album had little recognition on first release, but has gained more attention through multiple reissues. According to Robert Fripp the album sold only 500 copies. This information came from his royalty statement, but it seems unlikely that this was the total number sold on initial release. Most copies are stereo, but a rare mono LP was also released in the UK. The original United States and Canadian editions had a different cover from that of the UK version.

There are at least four CD editions: the first was in Japan with no bonus tracks, followed by US and UK releases with bonus tracks compiled from singles and previously unreleased recordings. A later Japanese re-issue in a paper sleeve contained the bonus tracks as well as a bonus paper sleeve reproduction of the US cover. Subsequent editions on Esoteric (UK) and Deram (Japan) followed this format. In 2025, Fripp reissued the album on LP and CD on Discipline Global Mobile, remastered by David Singleton, with the "somewhat dated" spoken word sections removed (but still containing the bonus tracks) as The Cheerful Insanity of Giles, Giles & Fripp (The Songs).

Also during 1968 the group recorded a series of demos at home, which would be released as The Brondesbury Tapes in 2001. Discipline would also reissue this in 2025 as a 21 song CD, and a 13-song LP entitled A Selection from The Brondesbury Tapes. Following this album Peter Giles was replaced on bass by Greg Lake. Soon after that the band changed their repertoire and renamed themselves King Crimson.

== Track listing ==
All tracks are sung by Michael Giles, except where noted.

Side one The Saga of Rodney Toady (Robert Fripp)
No.	Title	Writer(s)	Lead vocals	Length
1.	"North Meadow"	Peter Giles		2:29
2.	"Newly-weds"	P. Giles	M. Giles, P. Giles	2:07
3.	"One in a Million"	M. Giles		2:25
4.	"Call Tomorrow"	P. Giles	P. Giles	2:31
5.	"Digging My Lawn"	P. Giles	P. Giles	1:50
6.	"Little Children"	Robert Fripp		2:48
7.	"The Crukster"	M. Giles		1:35
8.	"Thursday Morning"	M. Giles		2:50
Total length:				18:35

Side two Just George (Michael Giles)
No.	Title	Writer(s)	Length
9.	"How Do They Know"	M. Giles	2:14
10.	"Elephant Song"	M. Giles	3:15
11.	"The Sun is Shining"	M. Giles	3:06
12.	"Suite No. 1" (instrumental)	Fripp	5:33
13.	"Erudite Eyes"	Fripp	5:05
Total length:			19:13 37:48

Bonus Tracks on 1992 CD release
No.	Title	Writer(s)	Lead vocals	Length
14.	"She Is Loaded"	P. Giles	P. Giles, M. Giles	3:11
15.	"Under the Sky"	Fripp (Note: Actually written by Ian McDonald and Peter Sinfield.)	Ian McDonald	4:01
16.	"One in a Million" (mono single)	M. Giles		2:25
17.	"Newly-Weds" (mono single)	P. Giles	P. Giles, M. Giles	2:44
18.	"Thursday Morning" (mono single)	M. Giles		2:57
19.	"Thursday Morning" (stereo single)	M. Giles		2:57
Total length:				18:15

== Personnel ==
=== Giles, Giles & Fripp ===
- Robert Fripp – guitars, mellotron; spoken word (The Saga of Rodney Toady)
- Peter Giles – bass guitar; vocals
- Michael Giles – drums, percussion; vocals, spoken word (Just George)
- Ian McDonald – lead vocals and guitar (14, 15), saxophone and piano (14)

=== Additional personnel ===
- Ted Barker, Cliff Hardy – trombone
- Raymond Cohen, Gerry Fields, Kelly Isaccs, Boris Pecker, William Reid, G. Salisbury – violin
- John Coulling, Rebecca Patten – viola
- Alan Ford, Charles Tunnell – cello
- Ivor Raymonde – string arrangements
- The Breakaways – backing vocals
- Mike Hill, Nicky Hopkins – keyboards

=== Production ===
- Produced by Wayne Bickerton
- Engineers: Terry Johnson, Bill Price, Martin Smith
- Re-mastering: Anthony Hawkins
