= Sacred Songs =

Studio album by Daryl Hall
- Released: March 11, 1980
- Recorded: August 1977
- Studio: The Hit Factory (New York City)
- Genres: Progressive rock; new wave
- Length: 46:31 (original); 52:01 (1999 reissue)
- Label: RCA Records
- Producer: Robert Fripp

Daryl Hall chronology
Sacred Songs (1980)	Three Hearts in the Happy Ending Machine (1986)

Professional ratings
Review scores
Source	Rating
Allmusic	4.5/5 stars

Sacred Songs is the first solo album by American singer/songwriter Daryl Hall, released on March 11, 1980. It was produced by Robert Fripp, who also played guitar on the album.

The album was recorded in 1977, but RCA Records did not release it for three years. According to Hall & Oates biographer Nick Tosches, "RCA refused to release Sacred Songs on the grounds that it wasn't commercial". The album sold well on release, but did not yield a hit single.

== Recording ==
=== Background ===
In the early 1970s, Daryl Hall had formed Hall & Oates, a partnership with guitarist and songwriter John Oates. They had produced several hit pop singles, but Hall had grown to feel artistically limited and in 1977 was much more concerned with expressing his own outlook on life and music than with making more hit songs. Robert Fripp had dissolved his progressive rock group King Crimson in 1974, and, after a sabbatical during which he considered himself retired from music for good, returned to music with session work and other guest appearances.

According to the liner notes for the 1999 CD reissue of Sacred Songs and Fripp biographer Eric Tamm, Hall and Fripp first met in 1974. Already familiar with one another's work, the duo felt an instant rapport, and planned to work together. In 1977, Hall and Fripp reconnected while Hall was writing songs for his solo debut, and Hall drafted Fripp as the album's producer and guitarist. Hall wrote all of the album's songs except for "Urban Landscape" (a "Frippertronics" solo by Fripp) and "NYCNY", for which Fripp wrote the music and Hall the lyrics; both of these tracks appeared on Fripp's solo album Exposure (1979), with the latter given new lyrics sung by Peter Hammill and Terre Roche and retitled "I May Not Have Had Enough of Me but I've Had Enough of You".

Sacred Songs was recorded in a span of three weeks, with most of the songs initially recorded with Hall singing and playing piano alongside Fripp's guitar work, followed by overdubs by Hall & Oates' regular touring band. Hall insisted on working with his own band rather than with the Los Angeles session musicians who had played on Hall & Oates' Bigger Than Both of Us (1976); Hall felt their performances were hampered by a disconnectedness from the songs. The album was intended as part of a loose trilogy with Peter Gabriel's 1978 self-titled album and Exposure (1979), all of which Fripp produced. Besides Hall and Fripp, the backing band for the album consisted of bassist Kenny Passarelli, drummer Roger Pope, and guitarist Caleb Quaye, all of whom were then part of the second iteration of the Elton John Band.

=== Release, aftermath, and legacy ===
Though still relatively pop-oriented, Sacred Songs was very different from the work of Hall & Oates, and RCA Records feared the album might be unsuccessful and alienate Hall's mainstream fans. Its release was postponed indefinitely; outraged, Hall and Fripp passed tapes of Sacred Songs to music journalists and disc jockeys. Tosches notes that a groundswell of interest was generated inside the music profession and from Hall's fans with a letter-writing campaign directed at RCA requesting the album's release.

Upon release, Sacred Songs peaked at #58 on the Billboard Pop Albums chart; however, there was no hit single from the record.

Afterwards, Hall recorded vocals for most of the tracks on Fripp's solo debut, Exposure; however, due to pressure from RCA and Hall's management, this was cut back to just two songs on the final release ("You Burn Me up I'm a Cigarette" and "North Star"). These are included as bonus tracks on some CD versions of Sacred Songs. Most of the Exposure recordings featuring Hall were finally released on the 2006 reissue of Exposure through Fripp's Discipline Global Mobile label. In notes for the 1999 Buddha Records CD reissue of Sacred Songs, Fripp describes Hall as the best all-around singer he had ever met and speculates that, had Sacred Songs been released as planned at the height of the punk rock zeitgeist, fans and critics might have seen Hall as an innovator akin to David Bowie.

Fripp and Hall considered forming a full-time band together with bassist Tony Levin and drummer Jerry Marotta, but this fell through. Fripp and Levin would later comprise half of a new King Crimson lineup, along with drummer Bill Bruford and guitarist and vocalist Adrian Belew.

Hall has performed songs from the album several times on his Live From Daryl's House web series: "North Star" was performed with Monte Montgomery on episode 9, "Babs and Babs" with Guster on episode 38, "Why Was It So Easy" with Butch Walker on episode 54, "NYCNY" with Minus the Bear on episode 62, "Babs and Babs" and "Don't Leave Me Alone With Her" with Ben Folds on episode 70, "Survive" with Charlie Starr of Blackberry Smoke on episode 86, and "NYCNY", "Babs and Babs", "You Burn Me Up I'm a Cigarette", and "The Farther Away I Am" with Fripp on episode 87.

== Influences ==
Both the lyrics and musical sounds of Sacred Songs reflected Hall's personal philosophy. The lyrical content alludes to Hall's interest in the work of occultist Aleister Crowley. Hall indicated in an interview with Timothy White that in 1974 he began a serious study of Western esotericism, reading books on topics including Kabbalah, ancient Celtic religion, and Crowley's Thelema. For example, the album track "Without Tears" is inspired by Crowley's Magick Without Tears. Fripp shared similar interests in mysticism; while at John G. Bennett's International Academy for Continuous Education at Sherborne House, Dorset, in the mid-1970s, he had studied the recorded lectures of Bennett and the work of Bennett's teacher George Gurdjieff.

== Track listing ==
All tracks are written by Daryl Hall, except where noted.

Side one
No.	Title	Writer(s)	Length
1.	"Sacred Songs"		3:14
2.	"Something in 4/4 Time"		4:22
3.	"Babs and Babs"		7:41
4.	"Urban Landscape"	Robert Fripp	2:29
5.	"NYCNY"	Hall; Fripp	4:33

Side two
No.	Title	Length
6.	"The Farther Away I Am"	2:52
7.	"Why Was It So Easy"	5:27
8.	"Don't Leave Me Alone with Her"	6:22
9.	"Survive"	6:37
10.	"Without Tears"	2:47
Total length:		46:31

1999 reissue bonus tracks
No.	Title	Writer(s)	Length
11.	"You Burn Me Up I'm a Cigarette"	Hall; Fripp	2:20
12.	"North Star"	Hall; Fripp; Joanna Walton	3:10
Total length:			52:01

== Personnel ==
=== Musicians ===
- Daryl Hall – vocals, piano, keyboards, synthesizer, mandar
- Robert Fripp – guitars, Frippertronics
- Caleb Quaye – guitar
- Kenny Passarelli – bass
- Roger Pope – drums
- Charlie DeChant – baritone saxophone (1), backing vocals (2)
- David Kent – backing vocals (2)

==== 1999 reissue ====
- Tony Levin – bass (11–12)
- Jerry Marotta – drums (11)
- Brian Eno – synthesizer (12)
- Sid McGinnis – pedal steel guitar (12)
- Phil Collins – drums (12)

=== Technical ===
- Produced by Robert Fripp
- Engineered by Ed Sprigg
- Assistant engineer – Ted Spencer
- Mastered by George Piros at Atlantic Studios (New York City, NY)
- Album cover – Sara Allen
- Photography – William Coupon
- Management – Tommy Mottola

==== 1999 reissue ====
- Produced by Mike Ragogna
- Project coordinators – Arlessa Barnes, Lisa Butler, Glenn Delgado, Christina DeSimone, Robin Diamond, Felicia Gearhart, Laura Gregory, Jeremy Holiday, Robin Manning, Ed Osborne, Larry Parra, Bruce Pollock, Dana Renert, Catherine Seligman, and Steve Strauss

== Charts ==
=== Album ===
Year	Chart	Peak Position
1980	Billboard Pop Albums	58

== Bibliography ==
- Nick Tosches, Daryl Hall/John Oates: Dangerous Dances (New York: St. Martin's Press, 1984). ISBN 0-312-35716-8
- Timothy White, "Daryl Hall," in Rock Lives (New York: Henry Holt & Co, 1990), pp. 581–594. ISBN 0-8050-1396-2
