= The League of Gentlemen (band) =

British band featuring Robert Fripp (1980)

- Origin: London, England
- Genres: Art rock; new wave
- Years active: 1980
- Label: EG/Polydor
- Past members: Robert Fripp; Barry Andrews; Sara Lee; Johnny Toobad (Johnny Elichaoff); Kevin Wilkinson

The League of Gentlemen were an English rock band active during March–December 1980 formed by King Crimson guitarist Robert Fripp. They should not be confused with Fripp's first semi-professional band of the early 1960s, which had the same name. Fripp referred to them as "a second-division touring new wave instrumental dance band".

== Background ==
The other members of the band were keyboardist Barry Andrews (formerly of XTC, later of Shriekback), bass guitarist Sara Lee (who later joined Gang of Four, the B-52's, and Indigo Girls) and drummer Johnny Toobad (Johnny Elichaoff). Andrews had played on Fripp's first solo album Exposure a couple of years earlier, while Lee and Toobad were discovered playing in London band Baby and the Black Spots. Toobad was replaced late in the band's tenure by Kevin Wilkinson (later of China Crisis and Squeeze) due to his escalating heroin addiction.

The Trouser Press Record Guide described the League of Gentlemen's music as typically taking "a simple medium-to-fast backbeat over which Fripp and Andrews locked horns, with melodic development emerging slowly, surely, subtly." Trouser Press also suggests that the League's foray into dance oriented rock was a precursor to Fripp's reformed King Crimson the following year.

== Touring ==
The band toured extensively in Europe and North America throughout 1980. The album sleeve notes state that they played a total of 77 gigs during 1980 and includes a full list of all these gigs starting at Moles, Bath on 10 April 1980 and finishing at the School of Economics, London on 29 November 1980.

The tour was split into three parts:

- Part 1: 10 April to 1 June – UK and Europe
- Part 2: 14 June to 22 July – North America
- Part 3: 10 September to 29 November – UK

Missing from the list are four (possibly warm-up) gigs at the 14th Century Hunting Lodge (now Lodge Farm House), outside the grounds of Kingston Lacy near Wimborne Minster, Dorset, England. These gigs are dated 24 to 27 February and pre-dated the first 'official' gig on 10 April at Moles, Bath.

Drummer Johnny Toobad was dismissed during Part 3 of the tour in Manchester on 22 November and was replaced for the remaining five dates, and for the recording of most of the band's studio album, by Kevin Wilkinson, who was in the support band.

== Discography ==
=== Studio album ===
- The League of Gentlemen (Editions EG/Polydor, 1981)

=== Compilation ===
- God Save the King (Editions EG, 1985)

=== Live album ===
- Thrang Thrang Gozinbulx (official bootleg, DGM Records, 1996)
