= The Equatorial Stars =

Studio album by Fripp & Eno
- Released: 2004
- Recorded: 2004
- Genre: Ambient
- Length: 47:57
- Labels: Discipline Global Mobile, Opal Records

Fripp & Eno chronology
Evening Star (1975)	The Equatorial Stars (2004)	Beyond Even (1992–2006) (2007)

Robert Fripp chronology
The Repercussions of Angelic Behavior (1999)	The Equatorial Stars (2004)	Beyond Even (1992–2006) (2007)

Brian Eno chronology
Drawn from Life (2001)	The Equatorial Stars (2004)	Another Day on Earth (2005)

Professional ratings
Aggregate scores
Source	Rating
Metacritic	70/100
Review scores
Source	Rating
AllMusic	4/5 stars
Mojo	4/5 stars
Pitchfork	7.8/10
Stylus	D+
Under the Radar	3/10

The Equatorial Stars is the third collaborative studio album by the duo of Robert Fripp and Brian Eno. The album was released in 2004, which marked almost 30 years since the two musicians had collaborated on their second album, Evening Star, in 1975.

As with their earlier collaborations, Fripp performs on electric guitar while Eno performs on synthesizers and uses electronic processing. However, they abandoned the Frippertronics system of tape loops used on the earlier albums in favor of purely digital effects.

== Track listing ==
All tracks named after stars or constellations.

All songs by Brian Eno and Robert Fripp.

1. "Meissa" – 8:08
2. "Lyra" – 7:45
3. "Tarazed" – 5:03
4. "Lupus" – 5:09
5. "Ankaa" – 7:01
6. "Altair" – 5:11
7. "Terebellum" – 9:40
