= Robert Fripp =

English musician (born 1946)

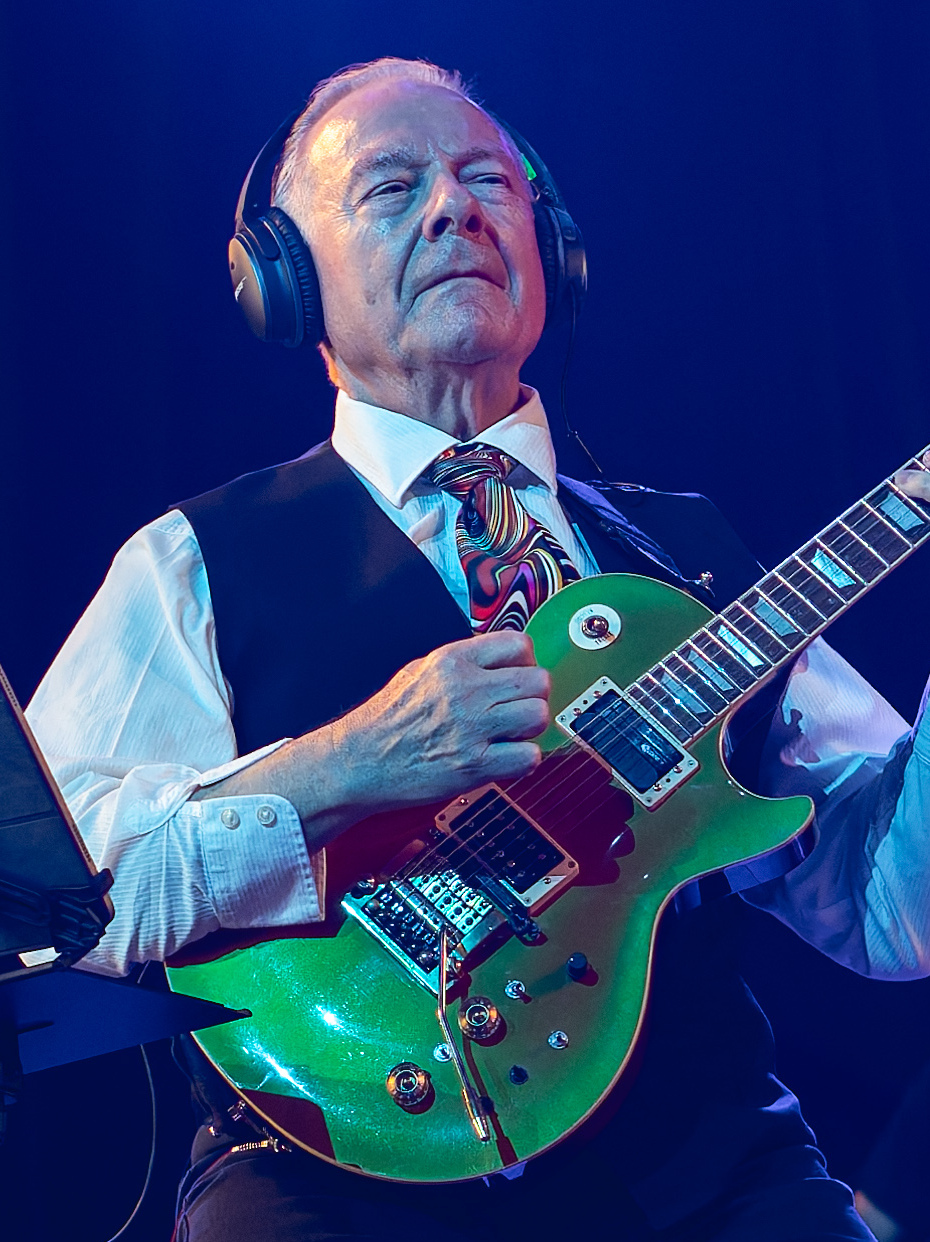
- Fripp in 2024

Background information
- Born: 16 May 1946 (age 80); Wimborne Minster, Dorset, England
- Genres: Art rock; progressive rock; post-progressive; ambient; experimental
- Occupations: Musician; songwriter; producer
- Instruments: Guitar; keyboards; synthesizers
- Years active: 1967–2009; 2013–present
- Labels: E.G.; Virgin; Discipline Global Mobile
- Formerly of: King Crimson; Giles, Giles and Fripp; Fripp & Eno; The League of Gentlemen; FFWD
- Spouse: Toyah Willcox (m. 1986)
- Website: dgmlive.com/robert-fripp

Robert Fripp (born 16 May 1946) is an English musician, composer, record producer, and author, best known as the guitarist, founder and only constant member of the progressive rock band King Crimson. He has worked extensively as a session musician and collaborator, notably with David Bowie, Blondie, Brian Eno, Peter Gabriel, Peter Hammill, Daryl Hall, the Roches, Talking Heads, and David Sylvian. He also composed the startup sound of Windows Vista, in collaboration with Tucker Martine and Steve Ball. His discography includes contributions to more than 700 official releases.

His compositions often feature unusual asymmetric rhythms, influenced by classical and folk traditions. His innovations include a tape delay system known as "Frippertronics" (superseded in the 1990s by a more sophisticated digital system called "Soundscapes") and New Standard Tuning.

Fripp is married to English singer and actress Toyah Willcox.

== Early life ==
Robert Fripp was born in Wimborne Minster, a town in Dorset, England, the second child of a working-class family. His mother Edith (née Greene; 1914–1993) was from a Welsh mining family; Fripp considers himself to be half Welsh. Her earnings from working at the Bournemouth Records Office allowed his father, Arthur Henry Fripp (1910–1985) to start a business as an estate agent. In 1957, at age eleven, Fripp received a guitar for Christmas from his parents and recalled, "Almost immediately I knew that this guitar was going to be my life". He then took guitar lessons from Kathleen Gartell and Don Strike; Elvis Presley's guitarist Scotty Moore inspired Fripp to play rock and roll, moving on to traditional jazz at thirteen and modern jazz at fifteen. Fripp has cited jazz musicians Charlie Parker and Charles Mingus as musical influences during this time.

In 1961, the fifteen-year-old Fripp joined his first band, the Ravens, which also included Gordon Haskell on bass. After they split in the following year, Fripp concentrated on his O-level studies and joined his father's firm as a junior negotiator. At this point, he intended to study estate management and, eventually, take over his father's business. However, at seventeen, Fripp decided to become a professional musician. He became the guitarist in the jazz outfit The Douglas Ward Trio, playing in the Chewton Glen hotel in New Milton, followed by a stint in the rock and roll band The League of Gentlemen, which included two former Ravens members. For a time, he gave guitar lessons to a local Wimborne friend, Al Stewart, who went on to achieve fame as a singer-songwriter. Much later, when Fripp was asked if any of his guitar students had found success, he replied, "Only one of them ever made it, and that was Al Stewart, and he did it by ignoring everything I ever tried to teach him.”

In 1965, Fripp left the group to attend Bournemouth College, where he studied economics, economic history, and political history for his A-levels. In February 1965, Fripp went to see the Duke Ellington Orchestra, an experience which moved him deeply. He subsequently spent three further years playing light jazz in the Majestic Dance Orchestra at Bournemouth's Majestic Hotel (replacing Andy Summers, who had left for London with Zoot Money). During this time, Fripp met musicians that he would collaborate with in his career, including John Wetton, Richard Palmer-James, and Greg Lake. At age 21, going back home from college late at night, Fripp tuned on to Radio Luxembourg, where he heard the last moments of the Beatles' "A Day in the Life". "Galvanized" by the experience, he went on to listen to the Beatles' 1967 album Sgt. Pepper's Lonely Hearts Club Band, Béla Bartók's string quartets, Antonín Dvořák's New World Symphony, Jimi Hendrix's Are You Experienced and John Mayall & the Bluesbreakers. Many years later, Fripp would recall that "although all the dialects are different, the voice was the same... I knew I couldn't say no". As a band leader, Fripp pointed out that Miles Davis and Duke Ellington inspired him to seek "constant change".

== Career ==
=== 1967–1974: Giles, Giles and Fripp and King Crimson ===
In 1967, Fripp responded to an advertisement placed by Bournemouth-born brothers Peter and Michael Giles, who wanted to work with a singing organist. Though Fripp was not what they sought, his audition with them was a success and the trio relocated to London and became Giles, Giles and Fripp. Their only studio album, The Cheerful Insanity of Giles, Giles and Fripp, was released in 1968. Despite the recruitment of two further members – singer Judy Dyble (formerly with Fairport Convention and later of Trader Horne) and multi-instrumentalist Ian McDonald – Fripp felt that he was outgrowing the eccentric pop approach favoured by Peter Giles, preferring the more ambitious compositions being written by McDonald, and the band broke up in 1968.

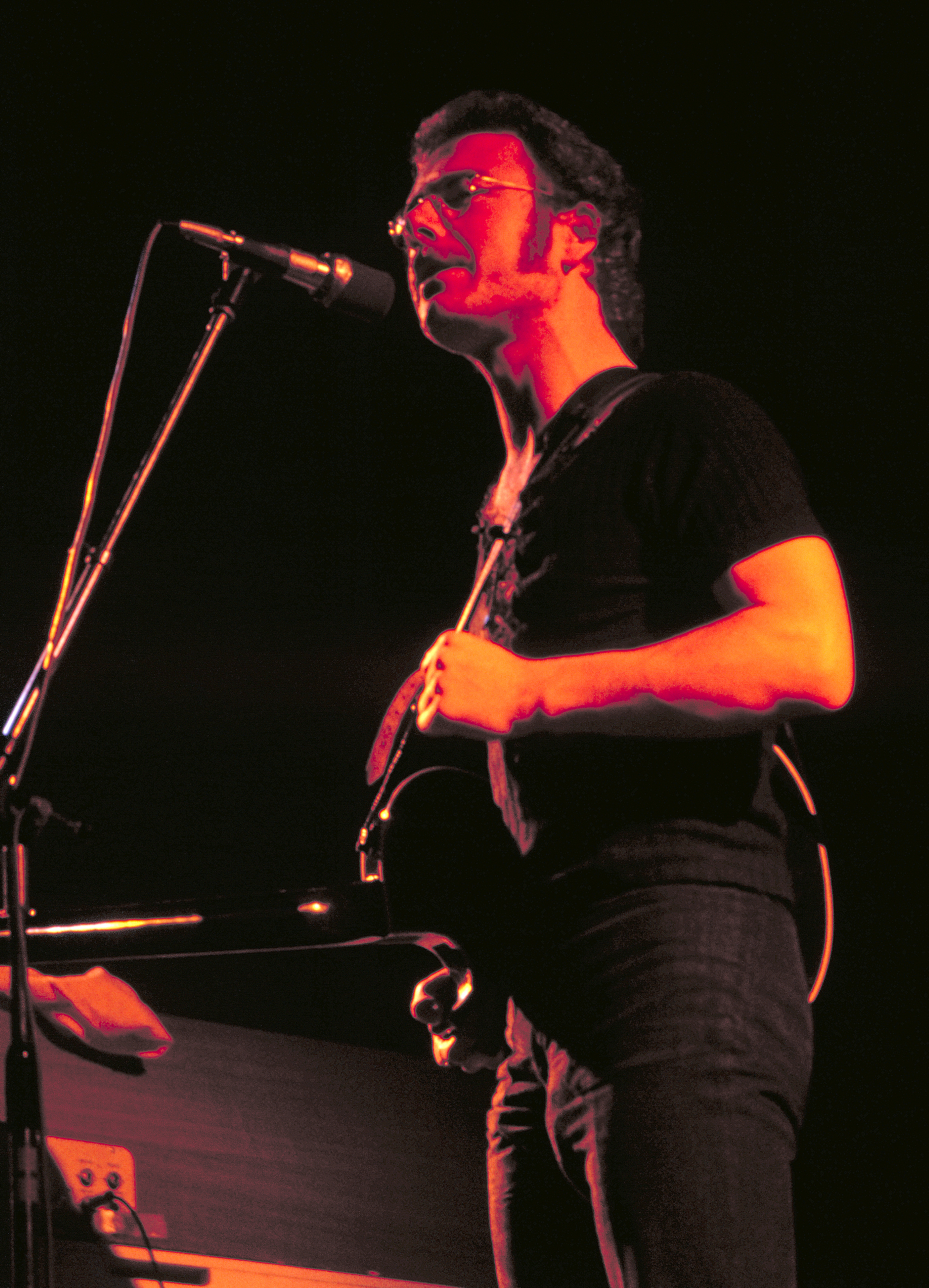
Fripp, on tour with King Crimson, in 1974.

Almost immediately, Fripp, McDonald and Michael Giles formed the first lineup of King Crimson in mid-1968, recruiting Fripp's old Bournemouth College friend Greg Lake as lead singer and bassist and McDonald's writing partner Peter Sinfield as lyricist, light show designer and general creative consultant. King Crimson's debut album, In the Court of the Crimson King, was released in late 1969 to great success: drawing on rock, jazz and European folk/classical music ideas, it is now regarded as one of the most influential albums in the history of progressive rock. The band was tipped for stardom, but, due to growing musical differences between Fripp on one side and Giles and McDonald on the other, broke up after its first American tour in 1970. A despondent Fripp offered to leave if it would allow King Crimson to survive; however, Giles and McDonald had independently decided that the band's music was "more Fripp's than theirs" and that it would be better if they were the ones to leave.

During the recording of the band's second album In the Wake of Poseidon, Greg Lake departed to form Emerson, Lake and Palmer with Keith Emerson of the Nice and Carl Palmer of Atomic Rooster. King Crimson issued two more albums, Lizard and Islands, with Fripp and Sinfield the only constants in a regularly changing lineup variously including Gordon Haskell, woodwind player Mel Collins, drummers Andy McCulloch and Ian Wallace and future Bad Company bassist Boz Burrell, in addition to a palette of guest players. Fripp was listed as the sole composer of the band's music during this time, which built on the first album's blueprint but progressed further into jazz-rock and free jazz while also taking form from Sinfield's esoteric lyrical and mythological concepts.

In 1971, Fripp ousted Sinfield and took over de facto leadership of King Crimson (although he has always formally rejected the label, preferring to describe his role as "quality control" or "a kind of glue"). From this point onwards, Fripp would be the only constant member of the band, which in turn would be defined primarily by his compositional and conceptual ideas. With avant-garde percussionist Jamie Muir, violinist David Cross, former Family bassist and singer John Wetton and former Yes drummer Bill Bruford now in the ranks, King Crimson produced three more albums of innovative and increasingly experimental rock, shedding members as they progressed: beginning with Larks' Tongues in Aspic, progressing with Starless and Bible Black after Muir's departure and culminating in Red after Cross was fired. Fripp formally disbanded the group in 1974, in what eventually turned out to be merely the first in a regular series of long hiatuses and further transformations.

=== 1971–1985: Collaborations, side projects, and solo career ===
Fripp pursued side projects during King Crimson's less active periods. He worked with Keith Tippett (and others who appeared on King Crimson records) on projects far from rock music, playing with and producing Centipede's Septober Energy in 1971 and Ovary Lodge in 1973. During this period he also worked with Van der Graaf Generator, playing on their albums H to He, Who Am the Only One and Pawn Hearts. He produced Matching Mole's Matching Mole's Little Red Record in 1972. Prior to forming the Larks-era KC, he collaborated on a spoken-word album with a woman he described as "a witch", but the resulting Robert Fripp & Walli Elmlark: The Cosmic Children of Rock was never officially released.

With Brian Eno, Fripp recorded (No Pussyfooting) in 1972, and Evening Star in 1974. These experimented with several avant-garde musical techniques that were new to rock. On "The Heavenly Music Corporation" from (No Pussyfooting), Fripp used a delay system using two modified Revox A77 reel-to-reel tape machines. The technique went on to play a central role in Fripp's later work, and became known as "Frippertronics".

In 1973, Fripp performed the guitar solo on "Baby's on Fire" from Eno's solo album Here Come the Warm Jets. In 1975, Fripp and Eno played live shows in Europe, and Fripp also contributed guitar solos to Eno's 1975 album Another Green World.

Fripp started what was intended as a permanent sabbatical from his musical career in 1975, during which he studied at J. G. Bennett's International Academy for Continuous Education, becoming interested in the mystical and philosophical ideas of Bennett's teacher George Gurdjieff. He returned to musical work the following year as a session guitarist on Peter Gabriel's debut solo album, released in 1977. Fripp toured with Gabriel to support the album, but used the pseudonym "Dusty Rhodes" and concealed himself on stage.

Fripp also produced and played on Gabriel's second album in 1978. "Robert is particularly skilful at keeping things fresh, and I like that a lot," Gabriel enthused. "I was very interested in Robert's experimental side; that corresponded exactly to what I wanted to do on this second record… There are two (Fripp) solos: one on 'On the Air' and the other on 'White Shadow'. And then he plays on 'Exposure'. He gives the colour to this piece, being fifty per cent responsible for its construction. And he also plays classical guitar here and there. He's a musician I admire a lot, because he's one of the only ones to mix discipline and madness with so much talent."

In 1977, Fripp played on David Bowie's album "Heroes" at Eno's invitation. Fripp soon collaborated with Daryl Hall on Sacred Songs.

During this period, Fripp began working on solo material, with contributions from poet/lyricist Joanna Walton and several other musicians, including Eno, Gabriel, and Hall (including the latter's partner, John Oates), as well as Peter Hammill, Jerry Marotta, Phil Collins, Tony Levin and Terre Roche. This material eventually became his first solo album, Exposure, released in 1979, followed by the Frippertronics tour in the same year.

While living in New York, Fripp contributed to albums and live performances by Blondie (Parallel Lines) and Talking Heads (Fear of Music), and produced The Roches' first and third albums, which featured several of Fripp's characteristic guitar solos. A second set of sessions with Bowie produced Scary Monsters (and Super Creeps), and he collaborated with Gabriel again on his third solo album. With Blondie, Fripp appeared live on stage at the Hammersmith Odeon on 12 January 1980, participating in a cover version of Bowie's "'Heroes'".

In 1980, Fripp would release God Save the Queen/Under Heavy Manners, a project that saw two different musical approaches to Frippertronics on one LP. The "A" side of the record, titled "God Save the Queen" attempted what Fripp referred to as "pure Frippertronics" which is "where Frippertronics is used alone." The "B" side of the record, titled "Under Heavy Manners" featured a collaboration with bassist Busta Jones, drummer Paul Duskin, and David Byrne of Talking Heads (as Absalm el Habib). The sounds of this side of the record featured what Fripp called "Discotronics" which was defined as "that musical experience resulting at the interstice of Frippertronics and disco."

Concurrent to this, Fripp would assemble what he called a "second-division touring new wave instrumental dance band" under the name League of Gentlemen, with bassist Sara Lee, keyboardist Barry Andrews and drummer Johnny Elichaoff (credited as "Johnny Toobad"). Elichaoff was later replaced by Kevin Wilkinson. The LOG toured for the duration of 1980.

In 1985 he produced the album Journey to Inaccessible Places by classical pianist Elan Sicroff, released on the Editions E.G. label.

=== 1981–1984: Reforming King Crimson ===
Later versions of Discipline featured this design by Steve Ball.

1981 saw the formation of a new King Crimson lineup, reuniting Fripp with Bruford and opening a new partnership with two American musicians: bassist/Chapman Stick player Tony Levin (who had played with Fripp on Exposure and in the first Peter Gabriel touring band) and Adrian Belew, a singer and guitarist who had previously played with Bowie, Talking Heads and Frank Zappa. Although the band had been conceptualised under the name Discipline, it came to Fripp's attention that the other members thought the name King Crimson was more appropriate: for Fripp, King Crimson had always been "a way of doing things" rather than a particular group of musicians. With the more pop-inspired Belew as main songwriter (complementing Fripp as main instrumental composer) the band took on a new style incorporating influences from Indonesian gamelan, new wave, and classical minimalism, with both guitarists experimenting extensively with guitar synthesizers. After releasing three albums (Discipline, Beat and Three of a Perfect Pair), Fripp dissolved the band in 1984.

During this period Fripp made two albums with Andy Summers of The Police. On I Advance Masked, Fripp and Summers played all the instruments. Bewitched was dominated more by Summers, who produced the record and collaborated with other musicians in addition to Fripp.

In 1982 Fripp produced and played guitar on Keep On Doing by the Roches. Village Voice rock critic Robert Christgau wrote that the album "sounds so good I'm beginning to believe Robert Fripp was put on earth to produce the Roches."

=== Guitar Craft ===
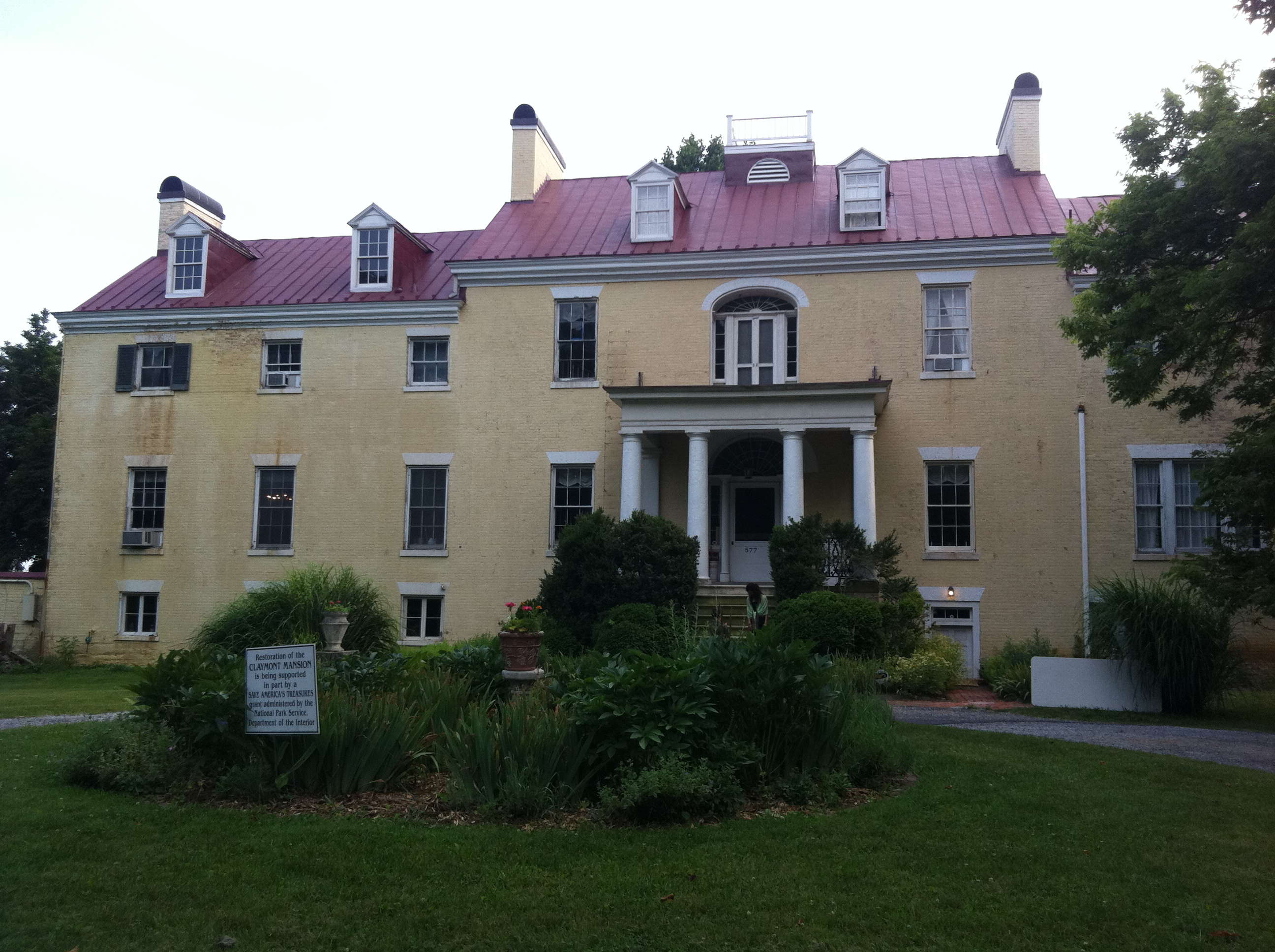
The first Guitar Craft course began 25 March 1985 at the Claymont Court site in Charles Town, West Virginia.

Fripp was offered a teaching position at the American Society for Continuous Education (ASCE) at Claymont Court in Charles Town, West Virginia, in 1984. He had been involved with the ASCE since 1978, eventually serving on its board of directors, and had long been considering the idea of teaching guitar through ideas derived from Bennett and Gurdjieff. His course, Guitar Craft, was begun in 1985, an offshoot of which was a performance group, "the League of Crafty Guitarists", which has released several albums. In 1986, he released the first of two collaborations with his wife, Toyah Willcox. The members of the California Guitar Trio are former members of The League of Crafty Guitarists and have also toured with King Crimson. Fripp is the patron of the Guitar Circle of Europe, which was founded in 2007, and of the Seattle Circle Guitar School, which was founded in 2010.

In February 2009, Fripp recommended that Guitar Craft cease to exist on its 25th anniversary in 2010.

On 1 September 2022 Fripp published The Guitar Circle, a book of writings concerning Guitar Craft.

=== Soundscapes ===
Fripp returned to recording solo in 1994, using an updated version of the Frippertronics technique that creates loops employing digital technology instead of analogue tapes. Fripp has released a number of records that he called "soundscapes", including 1999, Radiophonics, A Blessing of Tears, That Which Passes, November Suite, The Gates of Paradise, Love Cannot Bear and At the End of Time, as well as numerous download-only live recordings. (The sampler Pie Jesu consists of material compiled from A Blessing of Tears and The Gates of Paradise.)

=== 1990s collaborations with David Sylvian and others ===
Fripp's collaborations with David Sylvian feature some of his most exuberant guitar playing. Fripp contributed to Sylvian's twenty-minute track "Steel Cathedrals" from his Alchemy: An Index of Possibilities album of 1985. Then Fripp performed on several tracks from Sylvian's 1986 release, Gone to Earth.

In late 1991, Fripp had asked Sylvian to join a re-forming King Crimson as a vocalist. Sylvian declined the invitation, but proposed a possible collaboration between the two that would eventually become a tour of Japan and Italy in the spring of 1992.

Also in 1991, Fripp released an album with the project Sunday All Over The World, also featuring his wife Toyah Willcox, former League of Crafty Guitarists member Trey Gunn on Chapman Stick, and drummer Paul Beavis. The prior name of this band was Fripp Fripp, and they toured as such in 1988. They renamed to SAOTW, and toured again as SAOTW, in 1989.

In July 1993, Sylvian and Fripp released the collaborative effort The First Day. Other contributors were soon-to-be King Crimson member Trey Gunn on Chapman Stick and Jerry Marotta (who, like Sylvian, almost became a member of King Crimson) on drums. When the group toured to promote the CD, future King Crimson member Pat Mastelotto took over the drumming spot. The live document Damage was released in 1994, as was the joint venture, Redemption – Approaching Silence, which featured Sylvian's ambient sound sculptures (Approaching Silence) accompanying Fripp reading his own text (Redemption).

During the early and mid-1990s Fripp contributed guitar/soundscapes to Lifeforms (1994) by the Future Sound of London and Cydonia (released 2001) by the Orb, as well as FFWD, a collaborative effort with the latter's members. In addition, Fripp worked with Brian Eno co-writing and supplying guitar to two tracks for a CD-ROM project released in 1994 entitled Headcandy created by Chris Juul and Doug Jipson. Eno thought the visual aspects of the disc (video feedback effects) were very disappointing upon completion, and regretted participation. During this period, Fripp also contributed to albums by No-Man and the Beloved (1994's Flowermouth and 1996's X, respectively). He also contributed soundscapes and guitar to two albums by the UK band Iona: 1993's Beyond These Shores and 1996's Journey into the Morn.

=== 1994–2010: King Crimson redux ===
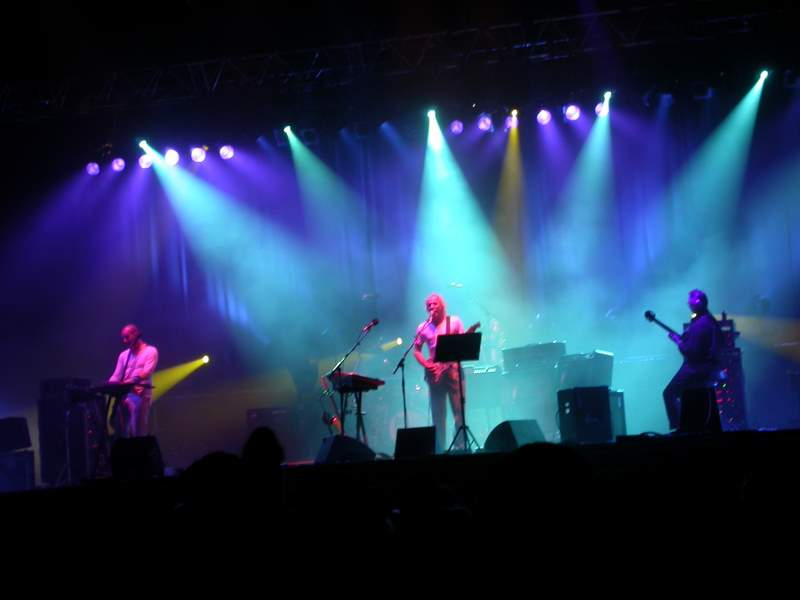
Trey Gunn, Adrian Belew, and Fripp from 2003 King Crimson

In late 1994, Fripp re-formed King Crimson for its fifth incarnation, adding Trey Gunn and Pat Mastelotto to the 1980s quartet in a configuration known as a "double trio". This line-up released the VROOOM EP in 1994 and the THRAK album the following year.

Though musically and relatively commercially successful, the double-trio King Crimson proved difficult to sustain in the long-term. From 1997 to 1999, the band "fraKctalised" into five experimental instrumental sub-groups known as ProjeKcts. By 1998 Bruford had quit the band altogether: in 2000, Fripp, Belew, Gunn and Mastelotto reunited as a four-piece King Crimson. This lineup produced two industrial metal-influenced studio albums, the construKction of light in 2000 and The Power to Believe in 2003.

Gunn departed at the end of 2003. Although Levin immediately returned to replace him, another hiatus followed until King Crimson reappeared in 2007 with the addition of Porcupine Tree drummer Gavin Harrison. This version of the band toured the eastern United States in 2008, reassessing the 1981-2003 back catalogue and introducing lengthy duets between the two drummers. No new original material was recorded by this line-up, and in 2010, Fripp announced that King Crimson were on another indefinite hiatus.

=== Work with G3, Porcupine Tree, Slow Music, Theo Travis, the Humans and others ===
In 2004, Fripp toured with Joe Satriani and Steve Vai as part of their G3 series. He also worked at Microsoft's studios to record the startup sound for Windows Vista. Fripp designed the soundscape and composed the melody, while Tucker Martine created the rhythm and Microsoft's Steve Ball added the harmonies and created the final arrangement.

this interesting factoid: in addition to 200 million Vista users with the 4 note splash, an extract from the Soundscapes' Vista sessions is estimated to strike up 91% of 32 trillion times on the new MS Mail programme this year. So, one of the planet's least popular music forms will also be the planet's most sounded in 2008. This has to be some kind of a record.

— Fripp's online diary at dgmlive.com

In late 2005 and early 2006, Fripp joined R.E.M./Nine Inch Nails drummer Bill Rieflin's improvisational Slow Music project, along with R.E.M. guitarist Peter Buck, bassist Fred Chalenor, session drummer Matt Chamberlain and Hector Zazou on electronics. This collective of musicians toured the west coast of America in May 2006.

In 2006 Fripp contributed his composition "At The End Of Time" to the Artists for Charity album Guitarists 4 the Kids, produced by Slang Productions, to assist World Vision Canada in helping underprivileged children. Throughout 2006, Fripp performed many solo concerts of soundscapes in intimate settings in churches around England and Estonia. In October 2006, ProjeKct Six (Fripp and Adrian Belew) played at select venues on the east coast of the U.S., opening for Porcupine Tree. In the same year, Fripp contributed to two songs by Porcupine Tree, "Way Out of Here" from their 2007 album Fear of a Blank Planet and "Nil Recurring" from the Nil Recurring EP, also in 2007. Fripp also sporadically performed as an opening act for Porcupine Tree on various tours from 2006 through 2009.

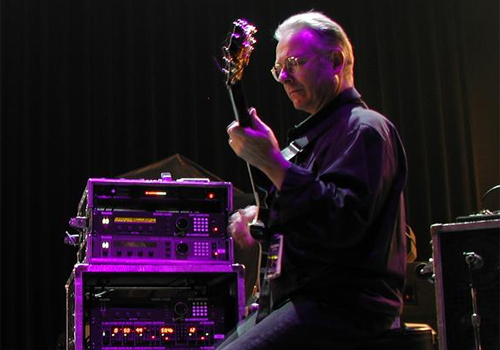
Fripp in 2007

In 2008, Fripp collaborated with Theo Travis on an album of guitar and flute-or-saxophone duets called 'Thread', and the duo played a brief English tour in 2009 (repeating the collaboration with the Follow album in 2012). Also in 2009, Fripp played a concert with the band the Humans (which consists of his wife Toyah Willcox, Bill Rieflin and Chris Wong), appeared on Judy Dyble's Talking With Strangers (along with Pat Mastelotto and others) and played on two tracks on Jakko Jakszyk's album The Bruised Romantic Glee Club. In 2010, Fripp contributed a guitar solo to an extended version of the song 'Heathen Child' by Grinderman, released as a B-side on the 'Super Heathen Child' single.

In 2021, the ambient/electronica album Leviathan was released. Fripp produced it and played guitar, in collaboration with British EDM Duo The Grid.

=== A Scarcity of Miracles, musical 'retirement' and new lineup of King Crimson ===
In May 2011, Jakko Jakszyk, Robert Fripp and Mel Collins released A Scarcity of Miracles: A King Crimson ProjeKct on the Panegyric label. The album also featured contributions by Tony Levin and Gavin Harrison, leading to speculation that the project was a dry run for a new King Crimson lineup.

In an interview published 3 August 2012, Fripp stated that he had retired from working as a professional musician, citing long-standing differences with Universal Music Group and stating that working within the music industry had become "a joyless exercise in futility". This retirement proved to be short-lived, only lasting as long as it took to come to a settlement with UMG.

In his online diary entry for 6 September 2013, Fripp announced the return of King Crimson as a seven-piece unit with "four Englishmen and three Americans". The new lineup was Fripp, Levin, both Mastelotto and Harrison on drums, returning 1970s band member Mel Collins and two new members: Jakko Jakszyk as singer and second guitarist, and Bill Rieflin as a third drummer. This version of the band went on tour in 2014 and 2015 with a setlist reworking and reconfiguring the band's 1960s and 1970s material (plus songs from A Scarcity of Miracles and new compositions). In early 2016, it was announced that former Lemon Trees/Noel Gallagher drummer Jeremy Stacey would substitute for Rieflin on that year's tour while the latter was on sabbatical. King Crimson continued touring as a seven- or eight-piece unit with Stacey as a permanent member on drums and keyboards, plus Rieflin (when available) on keyboards and "fairy dusting" until 2021. Rieflin last played with Crimson in 2018; he died 24 March 2020.

== Equipment ==
During the early years of King Crimson (1968–74), Fripp used two Gibson Les Paul guitars from 1957 and 1959. The '57 guitar featured three humbucker pick-ups (with one volume control on the pickguard controlling the middle pick-up). In the band's 1980s era, he favoured Roland GR-303 & GR-808 guitars for both straight guitar and synth control. In subsequent years, Fripp has used customized Les Paul-style guitars by Tokai, 48th St Custom, and Fernandes.

A signature model named for the guitarist (Crimson Guitars Robert Fripp Signature) features Fernandes Sustainer and MIDI pickups with a Les Paul-style body. A significant difference from the Gibson Les Paul is that the signature model is built using a deep set neck tenon rather than a traditional set neck.

Fripp recommended that Guitar Craft students adopt the Ovation 1867 Legend steel-string acoustic guitar. "Fripp liked the way the Ovation 1867 fitted against his body, which made it possible for him to assume the right-arm picking position he had developed using electric guitars over the years; on deeper-bodied guitars, the Frippian arm position is impossible without uncomfortable contortions", according to Tamm. While the 1867 Legend is no longer manufactured, it influenced the design of the Guitar Craft Pro Model of Guitar Craft Guitars, which has been endorsed by Fripp.

== Guitar technique ==
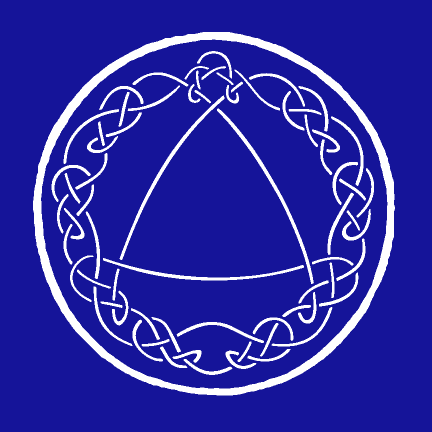
The knotwork symbol of Guitar Craft

Fripp began playing guitar at the age of eleven. When he started, he was tone deaf and had no rhythmic sense, weaknesses which led him later to comment that "Music so wishes to be heard that it sometimes calls on unlikely characters to give it voice." He was also naturally left-handed but opted to play the guitar right-handed.

While being taught guitar basics by his teacher Don Strike, Fripp began to develop the technique of crosspicking, which became one of his specialities. Fripp teaches crosspicking to his students in Guitar Craft.

In 1985, Fripp began using a tuning he called "New Standard Tuning" (C_{2}-G_{2}-D_{3}-A_{3}-E_{4}-G_{4}), which would also become popularised in Guitar Craft.

Fripp's guitar technique, unlike most rock guitarists of his era, is not blues-based but rather influenced by avant-garde jazz and European classical music. He combines rapid alternate picking and crosspicking with motifs employing whole-tone or diminished pitch structures and extended sixteenth-note patterns in moto perpetuo.

Rather than stand when performing, he seats himself on a stool (unusual for a performer in rock music), and by doing so was called in a May 1974 issue of Guitar Player "the guitarist who sits on stage".

== Personal life ==
Fripp married singer and actress Toyah Willcox on 16 May 1986 in Poole. From December 1987 until July 1999 they lived at and renovated Reddish House, the former home of Cecil Beaton, in the village of Broad Chalke in Wiltshire.

Fripp previously lived at Thornhill Cottage, Holt, Dorset (1971–1980) and Fernhill House, Witchampton (1980–1987). After Reddish House, the couple lived at Evershot Old Mansion (1999–2001). They then moved to their present home in Pershore, Worcestershire. The couple have no children and have arranged their will so as to leave their assets to the establishment of a musical educational trust for children.

Fripp is the patron of the Seattle Circle Guitar School in the United States and the Shallal Dance Theatre in Penzance. He also has had engagements as a motivational speaker, often at events with his sister Patricia, who is a keynote speaker and speech coach.

Fripp is a pescetarian. Nevill Drury details in Music for Inner Space: Techniques for Meditation & Visualisation that Fripp was interested in the Hermetic Qabalah, Wicca, German Renaissance philosopher Paracelsus, and George Gurdjieff via J. G. Bennett.

During the COVID-19 lockdowns, Fripp and Willcox uploaded many short, humorous videos to YouTube, usually covers of well-known songs, and mostly titled Toyah and Robert's Sunday Lunch. According to rock and metal news website MetalSucks, their stories about these covers were extremely popular; their cover of Metallica's "Enter Sandman" was the site's sixth-most popular story that year. The duo toured the UK in 2023, performing the Sunday Lunch songs in concert.

Fripp is a nephew of Alfie Fripp, the last surviving of the Royal Air Force personnel known as "39ers", who were shot down by the Luftwaffe in the first year of English involvement in World War II and subsequently held as prisoners of war.

== Awards and honours ==
Asteroid 81947 Fripp, discovered by Marc Buie at Cerro Tololo in 2000, was named in his honour. The official naming citation was published by the Minor Planet Center on 18 May 2019 (M.P.C. 114955).

Fripp is ranked 62nd on Rolling Stone magazine's 2011 list of the 100 Greatest Guitarists of All Time, having been ranked 42nd by David Fricke on its 2003 list. Tied with Andrés Segovia, he is ranked 47th on Gibson's Top 50 guitarists of all time.

== Discipline Global Mobile ==
In 1992, Fripp and producer/online content developer David Singleton co-founded Discipline Global Mobile (DGM) as an independent music label. DGM releases music by Fripp, KC, related acts, and other artists in CDs and in downloadable files. A 1998 Billboard profile stated that DGM had ten staff-members in Salisbury (England) and Los Angeles (USA). DGM has an aim "to be a model of ethical business in an industry founded on exploitation, oiled by deceit, riven with theft and fueled by greed." DGM insists that its artists retain all copyrights; consequently, even DGM's "knotwork" corporate-logo (pictured above) is owned by its designer, Steve Ball; the "knotwork" logo appeared earlier on the cover of later versions of the Discipline album. DGM's aims were called "exemplary" by Bill Martin (1997), who wrote that "Fripp has done something very important for the possibilities of experimental music" in creating DGM, which "has played a major role in creating favorable conditions for" King Crimson.

DGM publishes an on-line diary by Fripp, who often comments on performances and on relations with fans. A moderated forum allows fans to ask questions or to leave comments. Together, Fripp's diary and the fan forum display delayed dialogs in which Fripp and fans discuss diary-entries and forum-postings.

=== Copyright infringement complaints ===
In 2009, Fripp released a statement claiming that EMI and Sanctuary Universal had uploaded music to various music stores without his consent, stating "NONE of these downloads were licensed, authorised or legitimised. that is, every single download of any KC track represents copyright violation. or, to use one syllable instead of seven, theft."

In 2011, Fripp complained that the streaming service Grooveshark continued to stream his music despite his having delivered repeated takedown notices. Fripp and Grooveshark's correspondence was published by Digital Music News and in his diaries, which appear on the website of Discipline Global Mobile.

Fripp's published exchange was included in a suit against Grooveshark by Universal Music Group, which was filed in November 2011. UMG cited internal documents revealing that Grooveshark employees uploaded thousands of illegal copies of UMG-owned recordings. Fripp had previous experience protecting his music in litigation with music companies.

Fripp has stated that he believes "Unauthorised streaming or MP3 giveaways – it amounts to the same thing – copyright theft."

== Discography ==
Fripp has been extremely active as a recording musician and a producer. He has contributed to more than 700 official releases. The Robert Fripp Discography Summary, compiled by John Relph, also lists 120 compilations and 315 unauthorised releases (such as bootlegs). This means that more than 1100 releases (including both official and unofficial ones, as well as both studio and live recordings) can be found with Fripp participating. Studio releases are listed here.

=== Giles, Giles & Fripp ===
- 1968 : The Cheerful Insanity of Giles, Giles and Fripp
- 2001 : The Brondesbury Tapes
- 2001 : Metaphormosis

=== Solo ===
==== Studio albums ====
- 1979 : Exposure
- 1980 : God Save the Queen/Under Heavy Manners
- 1998 : The Gates of Paradise

==== Live albums ====
- 1981 : Let the Power Fall: An Album of Frippertronics
- 1994 : 1999: Soundscapes Live in Argentina
- 1995 : Radiophonics: 1995 Soundscapes volume 1
- 1995 : A Blessing of Tears: 1995 Soundscapes volume 2
- 1996 : That Which Passes: 1995 Soundscapes volume 3
- 1998 : November Suite: Soundscapes - Live at Green Park Station 1996
- 2005 : Love Cannot Bear
- 2007 : At the End of Time: Churchscapes Live in England & Estonia
- 2021 : Music for Quiet Moments

=== Brian Eno ===
- 1973 : (No Pussyfooting)
- 1975 : Evening Star
- 1994 : The Essential Fripp And Eno
- 2004 : The Equatorial Stars
- 2006 : The Cotswold Gnomes aka Beyond Even (1992–2006)
- 2021 : Live in Paris 28.05.1975

=== The League of Gentlemen ===
- 1981 : The League of Gentlemen
- 1996 : Thrang Thrang Gozinbulx

=== Andy Summers ===
- 1982 : I Advance Masked
- 1984 : Bewitched
- 1984 : Andy Summers & Robert Fripp Speak Out - Promo album

=== The League of Crafty Guitarists ===
- 1986 : Live!
- 1991 : Live II
- 1991 : Show Of Hands
- 1995 : Intergalactic Boogie Express - Live In Europe 1991

=== David Sylvian ===
- 1993 : The First Day
- 1993 : Darshan (The Road To Graceland)
- 1994 : Damage: Live

=== Theo Travis ===
- 2008 : Thread
- 2012 : Follow
- 2012 : Discretion

=== Other recordings ===
- 1981 : The Warner Brothers Music Show - The Return Of King Crimson (interviews with music inserts)
- 1985 : Network (EP, compilation)
- 1986 : The Lady or the Tiger (With Toyah Willcox)
- 1991 : Kneeling at the Shrine (With Sunday All Over the World)
- 1993 : The Bridge Between (With The Robert Fripp String Quintet)
- 1994 : FFWD (With The Orb)
- 1999 : The Repercussions of Angelic Behavior (With Bill Rieflin & Trey Gunn)
- 2000 : A Temple in the Clouds (With Jeffrey Fayman)
- 2007 : Robert Fripp: Unplugged - 3 CD Box-set
- 2011 : A Scarcity of Miracles (With Mel Collins & Jakko Jakszyk)
- 2012 : The Wine of Silence (With Andrew Keeling, David Singleton & Metropole Orkest)
- 2015 : Starless Starlight: David Cross & Robert Fripp

=== Collaborations ===
- 1970 : H to He, Who Am the Only One: Van der Graaf Generator
- 1971 : Pawn Hearts: Van der Graaf Generator
- 1971 : Fools Mate: Peter Hammill
- 1971 : Septober Energy: Centipede
- 1972 : Blueprint: Keith Tippett
- 1972 : Matching Mole's Little Red Record : Matching Mole
- 1973 : Ovary Lodge : Keith Tippett
- 1974 : Here Come the Warm Jets : Brian Eno
- 1975 : Another Green World : Brian Eno
- 1977 : "Heroes" : David Bowie
- 1977 : Before and After Science : Brian Eno
- 1977 : Peter Gabriel I : Peter Gabriel
- 1977 : Magic is a Child : Nektar
- 1978 : Parallel Lines : Blondie
- 1978 : Music for Films : Brian Eno
- 1978 : Peter Gabriel II : Peter Gabriel
- 1979 : Fear of Music : Talking Heads
- 1979 : The Roches : The Roches
- 1980 : Sacred Songs : Daryl Hall
- 1980 : Peter Gabriel III : Peter Gabriel
- 1980 : Scary Monsters (and Super Creeps): David Bowie
- 1982 : Keep On Doing : The Roches
- 1985 : Alchemy: An Index of Possibilities : David Sylvian
- 1986 : Gone to Earth : David Sylvian
- 1987 : Couple in Spirit : Keith Tippett and Julie Tippetts
- 1992 : 456 : The Grid
- 1992 : Nerve Net : Brian Eno
- 1993 : Beyond These Shores : Iona
- 1994 : Sidi Mansour : Cheikha Rimitti
- 1994 : Flowermouth : No Man
- 1994 : Battle Lines : John Wetton
- 1995 : Cheikha Rimitti Featuring Robert Fripp and Flea : Cheikha [Unreleased Tracks From The Sidi Mansour Album]
- 1996 : The Woman's Boat : Toni Childs
- 1998 : Lightness: For The Marble Palace
- 1998 : Arkangel : John Wetton
- 1999 : Birth of a Giant : Bill Rieflin
- 1999 : Approaching Silence : David Sylvian
- 2000 : Everything and Nothing : David Sylvian
- 2001 : Sinister : John Wetton
- 2001 : The Thunderthief : John Paul Jones
- 2002 : Trance Spirits : Steve Roach & Jeffrey Fayman With Robert Fripp & Momodou Kah
- 2002 : Camphor : David Sylvian
- 2006 : Side Three : Adrian Belew
- 2011 : Raised in Captivity : John Wetton

=== Production ===
- 1971 : Septober Energy : Centipede
- 1972 : Matching Mole's Little Red Record : Matching Mole
- 1972 : Blueprint : Keith Tippett
- 1973 : Ovary Lodge : Ovary Lodge - With Keith Tippett, Roy Babbington, etc.
- 1978 : Peter Gabriel : Peter Gabriel
- 1979 : The Roches : The Roches
- 1980 : Sacred Songs : Daryl Hall
- 1991 : The California Guitar Trio : The California Guitar Trio - Executive producer
- 1995 : Intergalactic Boogie Express : Coproducer.
- 1998 : Pathways : California Guitar Trio - Executive producer

== See also ==
- List of ambient music artists
