= Beyond Even (1992–2006) =

Compilation album by Fripp & Eno
- Released: 2006
- Recorded: 1992–2006
- Genre: Ambient
- Labels: Opal Records; Discipline Global Mobile

Fripp & Eno chronology
The Equatorial Stars (2004)	Beyond Even (1992–2006) (2006)	May 28, 1975 Olympia Paris, France (2011)

Robert Fripp chronology
The Equatorial Stars (2004)	Beyond Even (2006)	May 28, 1975 Olympia Paris, France (2011)

Brian Eno chronology
Another Day on Earth (2005)	Beyond Even (2006)	Everything That Happens Will Happen Today (2008)

Professional ratings
Review scores
Source	Rating
AllMusic	2/5 stars
Maelstrom	6/10 stars

Beyond Even (1992–2006) is a 2007 double-disc compilation of ambient music by English musicians Robert Fripp and Brian Eno, spanning over a decade. Their fourth album overall, it was first released on the Discipline Global Mobile website as a download, The Cotswold Gnomes, on 23 October 2006.

== Track listing ==
=== Disc one ===
1. Ringing Beat – 5:14
2. Gasp – 2:06
3. Sneering Loop – 3:11
4. Tripoli 2020 – 6:03
5. Behold the Child – 2:50
6. Timean Sparkles – 2:36
7. Dirt Loop – 4:01
8. The Idea of Decline – 4:19
9. Deep Indian Long – 4:57
10. Hopeful Timean (with Tim Harries) – 4:33
11. Glass Structure – 3:55
12. Voices – 4:52
13. Cross Crisis in Lust Storm (with Trey Gunn) – 5:20

=== Disc two ===
1. Ringing Beat – 5:23
2. Gasp – 2:21
3. Sneering Loop – 3:22
4. Tripoli 2020 – 6:14
5. Behold the Child – 3:00
6. Timean Sparkles – 2:47
7. Dirt Loop – 4:28
8. The Idea of Decline – 4:24
9. Deep Indian Long – 5:12
10. Hopeful Timean – 4:43
11. Glass Structure – 4:09
12. Voices – 5:10
13. Cross Crisis in Lust Storm (with Trey Gunn) – 5:24

== Notes ==
- Disc two originally released in 2006 as digital files. Previously unreleased on CD.
- Disc one previously unreleased segued version.
