= Let the Power Fall: An Album of Frippertronics =

Live album by Robert Fripp
- Released: April 1981
- Recorded: June–August 1979
- Venue: Robson Square Theatre, Vancouver ("1984", "1985", "1987"); Tower Records, Berkeley ("1986"); Walker Art Center, Minneapolis ("1988"); Mabuhay Gardens, San Francisco ("1989")
- Genre: Ambient, experimental, drone
- Length: 51:10
- Label: Editions E.G., Polydor
- Producer: Robert Fripp

Robert Fripp chronology
The League of Gentlemen (1981)	Let the Power Fall: An Album of Frippertronics (1981)	Discipline (1981)

Professional ratings
Review scores
Source	Rating
AllMusic	4/5 stars
Robert Christgau	B−

Let the Power Fall: An Album of Frippertronics is the third solo album by British guitarist and composer Robert Fripp, and the first on which he is the sole performer. It was released by Editions E.G. in April 1981, shortly after the album he made with The League of Gentlemen.

It is an album of live improvised performances created using his Frippertronics looping system, recorded during the North American leg of his 1979 one-man tour of small venues. The tour dates and recording locations are listed on the rear of the album sleeve, along with a structured list of maxims pertaining to his thinking at the time, such as "Dogmatic attachment to the supposed merits of a particular structure hinders the search for an appropriate structure."

The extensive sleeve notes also state that the track "1984" was used in the 1981 Amos Poe film Subway Riders and that "various selections" were featured in the 1981 Victor Schonfeld film Animals, better known as The Animals Film.

== Track listing ==
All titles by Robert Fripp

=== Side I (EGED 10A) ===
1. "1984" (12:09)
2. "1985" (11:20)

=== Side II (EGED 10B) ===
1. "1986" (5:21)
2. "1987" (5:14)
3. "1988" (6:33)
4. "1989" (11:32)

== Personnel ==
- Robert Fripp – electric guitar, effects units, two open-reel tape recorders, mixer, engineering

Also credited are:

- Danielle Dax – front cover
- Joep Bruinje – photo of Fripp performing in Amsterdam
- The famous Mary Lou Green – hair
- Alwyn Clayden & Rob O'Connor – cover assemblage
