= Brian Eno discography =

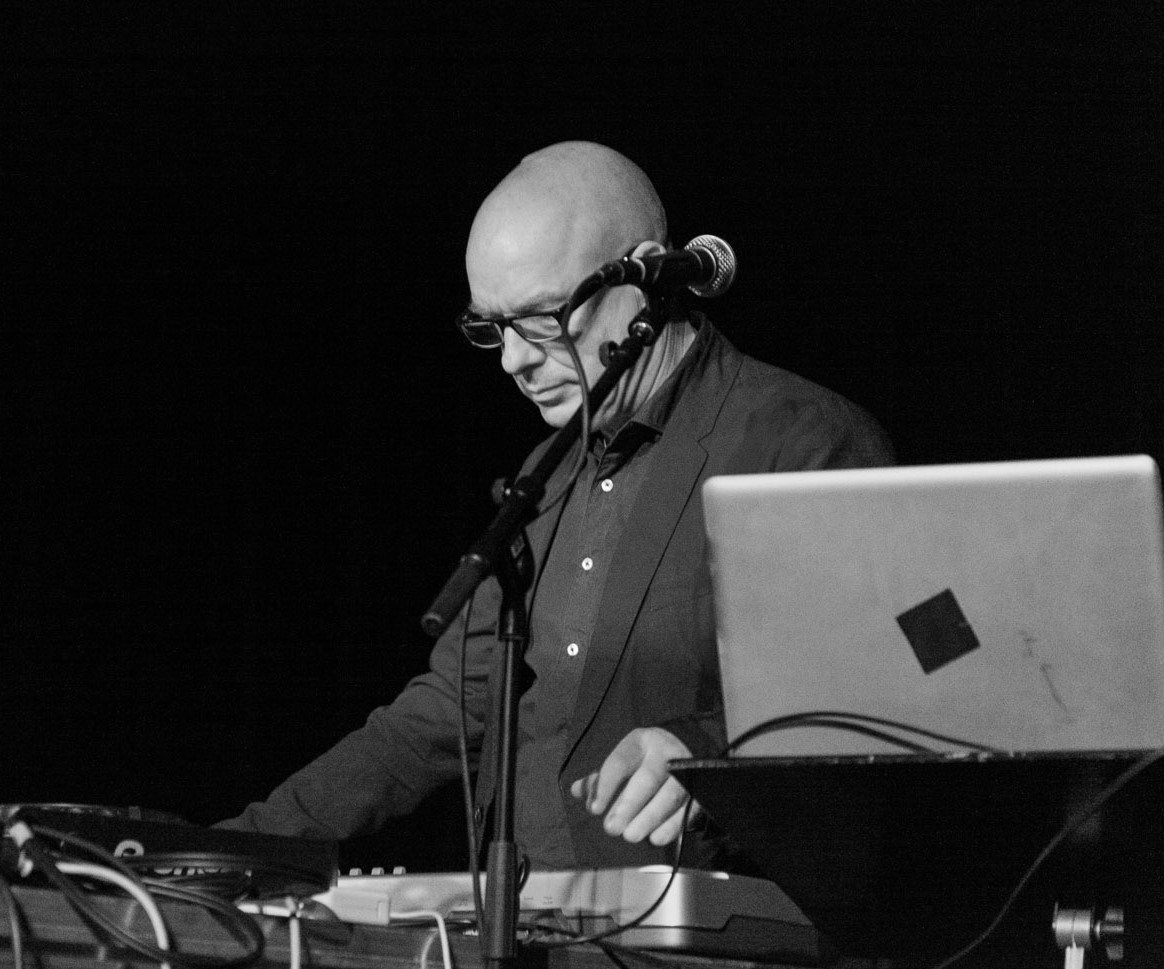
- Brian Eno at Punkt in 2012
- Studio albums: 32
- Extended plays: 2
- Compilation albums: 18
- Singles: 27
- Video albums: 4
- Collaborative albums: 31
- Remix album: 1
- Production credits: 37

The production and album discography of Brian Eno primarily consists of 32 solo studio albums, 31 collaborative studio albums, 18 compilation albums, one remix album, four video albums, nine extended plays, and 27 singles, as well as numerous productions credits from numerous artists & bands' singles, albums and compilations. Opal Records was launched in 1987 by Brian Eno as the label for the US market, where it was distributed by Warner Bros until 1993. He further used the name for releases of the music of his installations (all issued without ID number).

== Albums ==
=== Solo studio albums ===
List of studio albums, with selected chart positions, sales figures and certifications
Year	Title	Label	Peak chart positions						Certifications and notes
Year	Title	Label	UK	NZ	US	US Alt	US Elec.	US Indie	Certifications and notes
1974	Here Come the Warm Jets	Island (ILPS 9268)	26	—	151	—	—	—	
1974	Taking Tiger Mountain (By Strategy)	Island (ILPS 9309)	—	37	—	—	—	—	
1975	Another Green World	Island (ILPS 9351)	—	24	—	—	—	—	
1975	Discreet Music	Obscure/Island (OBS 3)	—	—	—	—	—	—	
1977	Before and After Science	Polydor (2302 071), US: Island (ILPS 9478)	—	18	171	—	—	—	
1978	Music for Films	Polydor (2310 623)	55	27	—	—	—	—	
1979	Ambient 1: Music for Airports	E.G./Polydor (AMB 1, 2310 647)	—	—	—	—	—	—	BPI: Silver
1982	Ambient 4: On Land	E.G./Polydor (EGED 20 AMB 4, 2311 107, UK: 2335 228)	93	—	—	—	—	—	
1983	Apollo: Atmospheres and Soundtracks	E.G./Polydor (EG 53, 813 535, US: ENO 5)	16	48	— (Note: Apollo: Atmospheres and Soundtracks did not enter the US Billboard 200 but did peak at number 48 on the Top Album Sales chart.)	—	16	—	BPI: Silver
1985	Thursday Afternoon	E.G./Polydor (EGCD 64, 827 494-2)	—	—	—	—	—	—	
1992	Nerve Net	Opal/Warner (45033)	70	—	—	—	—	—	
1992	The Shutov Assembly	Opal/Warner (45010)	—	—	—	—	—	—	
1993	Neroli	All Saints (ASCD15), US: Gyroscope (CAROL 6600-2)	—	—	—	—	—	—	
1997	The Drop	All Saints (ASCD 32), US: Thirsty Ear (THI 66032)	135	—	—	—	—	—	17 on New Age charts
1997	Extracts from Music for White Cube	Opal	—	—	—	—	—	—	
1998	Lightness: Music for the Marble Palace – The State Russian Museum, St. Petersburg	Opal	—	—	—	—	—	—	
1999	I Dormienti	Opal	—	—	—	—	—	—	
1999	Kite Stories	Opal	—	—	—	—	—	—	
2000	Music for Civic Recovery Centre	Opal	—	—	—	—	—	—	
2001	Compact Forest Proposal	Opal	—	—	—	—	—	—	
2003	January 07003: Bell Studies for the Clock of the Long Now	Opal	—	—	—	—	—	—	
2005	Another Day on Earth	Opal/Hannibal/US: Rykodisc (HNCD1475)	75	—	—	—	13	32	
2006	77 Million: Laforet, Tokyo, March 2006	Opal/Beat Records (BRCLTD1)	—	—	—	—	—	—	
2010	Making Space	Opal/Lumen London (LL077)	—	—	—	—	—	—	
2011	Drums Between the Bells	Opal/Warp (214)	106	—	—	—	9	44	
2012	Lux	Opal/Warp (231)	77	—	— (Note: Lux did not enter the US Billboard 200 but did peak at number 162 on the Current Album Sales chart.)	—	7	27	
2016	The Ship	Opal/Warp (272)	28	—	175	9	1	11	
2017	Reflection	Opal/Warp (280)	78	—	—	23	2	17	
2020	Rams - Original Soundtrack Album	Opal/Universal (085 524-9)	—	—	81	—	—	—	
2022	ForeverAndEverNoMore	Opal/UMG	32	—	— (Note: ForeverAndEverNoMore did not enter the US Billboard 200 but did peak at number 33 on the Top Album Sales chart.)	—	—	—	
2023	Top Boy (Score From The Original Series)	Opal/Netflix Music	—	—	—	—	—	—	
2025	AURUM	Opal	—	—	—	—	—	—	
"—" denotes albums that did not chart

=== Collaborative studio albums ===
Year	Album	Collaborators (notes)	Label	Peak chart positions					
Year	Album	Collaborators (notes)	Label	UK	US	US Alt	US Elec.	US Indie	US Rock
1973	(No Pussyfooting)	Robert Fripp	Island (HELP 16)	—	—	—	—	—	—
1974	June 1, 1974	Kevin Ayers, John Cale, and Nico	Island (ILPS 9291)	—	—	—	—	—	—
1974	Lady June's Linguistic Leprosy	Kevin Ayers, Pip Pyle and Lady June	Caroline/Virgin (C 1509)	—	—	—	—	—	—
1975	Evening Star	Robert Fripp	Island (HELP 22)	—	—	—	—	—	—
1977	Cluster & Eno	Cluster	Sky (010)	—	—	—	—	—	—
1978	After the Heat	Cluster (listed as Eno, Moebius, Roedelius)	Sky (021)	—	—	—	—	—	—
1979	(Robert Sheckley's) In a Land of Clear Colours	Peter Sinfield (as narrator) Multimedia album, text by Robert Sheckley, illustrations by Leonor Quiles; Limited ed. of 1000, masters were then destroyed	Mensanjero; Voiceprint (VP151CD)	—	—	—	—	—	—
1980	Ambient 2: The Plateaux of Mirror	Harold Budd	E.G. (EGAMB 002)	—	—	—	—	—	—
1980	Fourth World, Vol. 1: Possible Musics	Jon Hassell	E.G. (EGED 7)	—	—	—	—	—	—
1981	My Life in the Bush of Ghosts	David Byrne	E.G. (EGLP 48)	29	44	—	—	—	—
1984	The Pearl	Harold Budd	E.G. (EGSP-2)	—	—	—	—	—	—
1988	Music for Films III	Daniel Lanois, Roger Eno, Michael Brook, Harold Budd, Laraaji a.o.	Opal (25769)	—	—	—	—	—	—
1990	Wrong Way Up	John Cale	Opal (26421)	—	—	—	—	—	—
1995	Spinner	Jah Wobble	All Saints (23)	71	—	—	—	—	—
1995	Original Soundtracks 1	U2 (as Passengers)	Island (8043)	12	76	—	—	—	—
1997	Tracks and Traces	Harmonia & Eno '76 (or Harmonia '76)	Rykodisc	—	—	—	—	—	—
2000	Music for Onmyo-Ji	J. Peter Schwalm	Victor (60980)	—	—	—	—	—	—
2001	Drawn from Life	J. Peter Schwalm	Astralwerks (10148)	196	—	—	—	—	—
2004	The Equatorial Stars	Robert Fripp	Opal	—	—	—	23	—	—
2007	Beyond Even	Robert Fripp	DGM (0702)	—	—	—	—	—	—
2008	Everything That Happens Will Happen Today	David Byrne	Todo Mundo	153	174	—	—	18	—
2010	Small Craft on a Milk Sea	Leo Abrahams and Jon Hopkins	Warp	82	84	15	2	9	22
2011	Drums Between the Bells	Rick Holland	Warp	106	—	—	9	44	—
2011	Panic of Looking	Rick Holland	Warp	—	—	—	—	—	—
2014	Someday World	Karl Hyde	Warp	46	194	—	6	33	50
2014	High Life	Karl Hyde	Warp	94	194	—	7	31	—
2017	Finding Shore	Tom Rogerson	Dead Oceans (DOC146)	—	—	—	—	—	—
2018	American Utopia	David Byrne Eno wrote eight of the ten songs, and plays on four of them	Nonesuch	—	—	—	—	—	—
2020	Dokument #2	Laurie Anderson and Ebe Oke	Kjelfred & Lentz	—	—	—	—	—	—
2020	Mixing Colours	Roger Eno	Opal	—	— (Note: Mixing Colors did not enter the US Billboard 200 but did peak at number 63 on the Top Album Sales chart.)	—	23	—	—
2023	Secret Life	Fred Again	Text	—	—	—	24	—	—
2025	Luminal	Beatie Wolfe	Verve	—	—	—	—	—	—
2025	Lateral	Beatie Wolfe	Verve	—	—	—	—	—	—
2025	Liminal	Beatie Wolfe	Verve	—	—	—	—	—	—
"—" denotes albums that did not chart

=== Remix albums ===
List of remix albums, with selected chart positions, sales figures and certifications
Title	Album details	Peak chart positions	
Title	Album details	US Curr.	US New Age
Forever Voiceless	Released: 22 April 2023; Label: Verve	83	1

=== Compilation albums ===
Year	Title	Label	Notes
1981	Music for Airplay	E.G. (ENO DJ)	highlights from his first four rock albums
1983	Music for Films Volume 2	E.G. (EGSP-2)	highlights from Apollo: Atmospheres and Soundtracks plus six unreleased tracks
1983	Working Backwards 1983–1973	E.G. (EGBS-2)	box set (11 LPs), nine previously released albums plus Music for Films II and Rarities
1984	Begegnungen	Sky (87090)	with Cluster and related recordings
1985	Begegnungen II	Sky (87095)	with Cluster
1985	Old Land	Sky (SKY 105)	with Cluster
1986	More Blank Than Frank CD released as Desert Island Selection	E.G. (EGLP 65)	highlights from 1973 to 1977, LP, MC and CD editions slightly different
1993	Eno Box II: Vocal	Virgin (ENOBX 2)	box set (3 CDs plus booklet), vocal tracks 1973–1992
1994	The Essential Fripp and Eno	Venture (CDVE 920)	with Robert Fripp, highlights from Fripp & Eno albums. Includes unreleased material from 1979.
1994	Eno Box I: Instrumental	Virgin (ENOBX 1)	box set (3 CDs plus booklet), instrumentals 1970–1988
1999	Sonora Portraits	Materiali sonori (95701)	
2003	Curiosities Volume 1	Opal	unused music
2005	Curiosities Volume II	Opal	unused music
2005	More Music for Films	Astralwerks	from Music for Films, Music for Films Volume 2 and Eno Box I: Instrumental
2006	Beyond Even DGM release as The Cotswold Gnomes	Opal (0702)/DGM	with Robert Fripp, 1992–2006, prev. unreleased on disc (2 CD)
2018	Music for Installations	Astralwerks/Capitol/Universal	
2020	Film Music 1976–2020	Opal/UMC/Universal	8 released and 7 unreleased themes composed for films and TV series

== EPs ==
Title	Album details	Notes
Panic of Looking	Released: 2011; Label: Warp, Opal (322)	
Luminous	Released: 2020; Label: Deutsche Grammophon	with Roger Eno
Film Music: Crime Pays	Released: 18 December 2020; Label: UMG	
Film Music: Interior	Released: 8 January 2021; Label: UMG	
Film Music: Voices & Words	Released: 15 January 2021; Label: UMG	
Film Music: Jarman > Stillness	Released: 25 January 2021; Label: Opal, UMG	
Film Music: Europa	Released: 5 February 2021; Label: UMG	
Film Music: Science / Fiction	Released: 12 February 2021; Label: UMG	
Small Craft	Released: February 10, 2023; Label: Opal, Universal	Previously released outtakes from Small Craft on a Milk Sea
Intenser	Released: November 2026; Label: Opal, Universal	

== Singles ==
Title	Year	Peak chart positions		Album
Title	Year	US AAA	US Dance	Album
"Seven Deadly Finns"	1974	—	—	Non-album singles
"The Lion Sleeps Tonight (Wimoweh)"	1975	—	—	Non-album singles
"King's Lead Hat" (different mix from LP)	1978	—	—	Before and After Science
"The Jezebel Spirit"	1981	—	37	My Life in the Bush of Ghosts
"Backwater"	1986	—	—	Before and After Science
"Ali Click"	1992	—	—	Nerve Net
"Fractal Zoom"	1992	—	—	Nerve Net
"Ascent (An Ending)"	2004	—	—	Clean
"Baby's on Fire"	2007	—	—	Here Come the Warm Jets
"Strange Overtones"	2008	14	—	Everything That Happens Will Happen Today
"Lux" (excerpt)	2012	—	—	Lux
"Dream Nails" (with Sebastian Rochford)	2012	—	—	Non-album single
"Lux" (Nicolas Jaar Remix)	2013	—	—	Brian Eno x Nicolas Jaar x Grizzly Bear
"Chain" (with Leo Abrahams)	2015	—	—	Daylight
"The Ship"	2016	—	—	The Ship
"Fickle Sun (iii) I'm Set Free"	2016	—	—	The Ship
"Only Once Away My Son" (with Kevin Shields)	2017	—	—	Non-album single
"Kazakhstan" (edit)	2018	—	—	Music for Installations
"The Weight of History / Only Once Away My Son" (with Kevin Shields)	2018	—	—	Non-album singles
"One More Yard" (with Evamore and Sinéad O'Connor)	2018	—	—	Non-album singles
"City of Life"	2020	—	—	split single with Derrick May
"Wanting to Believe (O Holy Night)" (with Roger Eno)	2021	—	—	Winter Tales
"Lago Escondido" (with Samuel Aguilar)	2022	—	—	Música para los Jameos del Agua
"There Were Bells"	2022	—	—	ForeverAndEverNoMore
"Line in the Sand" (with Hot Chip and Goddess)	2022	—	—	Non-album singles
"Epica Extension" (remix for Jean-Michel Jarre)	2022	—	—	Non-album singles
"Making Gardens Out of Silence in the Uncanny Valley"	2023	—	—	ForeverAndEverNoMore

== Other appearances ==
Year	Song	Album	Notes
1978	"Dover Beach" and "Slow Water"	Jubilee	"Slow Water" released same year on Music for Films
1984	"Prophecy Theme"	Dune	with Roger Eno and Daniel Lanois
1988	"You Don't Miss Your Water"	Married to the Mob	solo William Bell cover
1988	"Saint Tom", "White Mustang", "Sirens", "Asian River", "Theme for 'Opera'", and "Theme from 'Creation'"	Music for Films III	"White Mustang" and "Sirens" with Daniel Lanois, "Theme for 'Opera'" with Roger Eno
1988	"From the Beginning"	Opera	solo
1992	"Under"	Songs from the Cool World	solo, rerecorded for Another Day on Earth
1995	"Force Marker"	Heat	solo
1995	"Stravinsky", "Distant Hill", and "Radiothesia III"	Future Perfect	solo, from unreleased Glitterbug soundtrack
1996	"My Dark Life"	Songs in the Key of X	with Elvis Costello
2013	"Mother of Violence"	And I'll Scratch Yours	solo Peter Gabriel cover
2023	"Little Roof"	Earth Day 2023	solo

=== Live ===
Year	Song	Album	Notes
1974	"Driving Me Backwards" and "Baby's on Fire"	June 1, 1974	from concert with Kevin Ayers, John Cale, and Nico

== Videography ==
=== Video albums ===
Year	Video details	Notes
1981	Mistaken Memories of Mediaeval Manhattan: Released: 1981; Label: Mystic Fire; Format: VHS	Later compiled on 14 Video Paintings
1984	Thursday Afternoon: Released: 1984; Label: Sony; Format: VHS, LD	Later compiled on 14 Video Paintings
1994	Headcandy: Released: 1994; Label: BMG (76896-40067); Format: CD-ROM	Collaboration with Chris Juul and Doug Jipson
2006	77 Million Paintings: Released: 26 September 2006; Label: Ryko; Format: DVD	Revised edition released 2007

=== Music videos ===
Title	Year	Director(s)
"Here Come the Warm Jets"	1973	
"Seven Deadly Finns" (live)	1974	
"Like I Was a Spectator"	1983	NASA
"Thursday Afternoon"	1984	Daniel Lanois and Brian Eno
"Lost in the Humming Air" (featuring Harold Budd)	2005	Martin Davies
"An Ending (Ascent)"	2019	NASA
"Blonde"	2020	Deutsche Grammophon employees
"Decline and Fall"	2020	Henrique Goldman
"There Were Bells"	2021/22	Tilo Krause

== Productions, mixes, and guest appearances ==
Year	Album	Role	Artist
1974	Fear	synthesizer, effects	John Cale
1974	Captain Lockheed and the Starfighters	synthesizer, electronic effects	Robert Calvert
1974	Lady June's Linguistic Leprosy	vocals, various instruments	Lady June
1974	The End...	synthesizer	Nico
1975	The Rock Peter and the Wolf	synthesizer	Jack Lancaster and Robin Lumley
1975	Mainstream	synthesizer, treatments	Quiet Sun
1975	Diamond Head	vocals, treatments, various instruments	Phil Manzanera
1975	Lucky Leif and the Longships	production, synthesizer	Robert Calvert
1975	New & Rediscovered Musical Instruments	production	David Toop & Max Eastley
1976	Voices and Instruments	production	Jan Steele / John Cage
1977	Low	synthesizer, various instruments, guitar treatment	David Bowie
1977	Ultravox!	production	Ultravox
1977	Heroes	synthesizer, keyboards, guitar treatment	David Bowie
1978	More Songs About Buildings and Food	production, synthesizer, various instruments, backing vocals	Talking Heads
1978	No New York	production	Various artists
1978	The Pavilion of Dreams	production, vocals	Harold Budd
1978	Q: Are We Not Men? A: We Are Devo!	production, synthesizer, vocals	Devo
1979	Fear of Music	songwriting (on "I Zimbra" and "Drugs"), production, treatment, vocals	Talking Heads
1979	Lodger	songwriting, various instruments, atmospheres, backing vocals	David Bowie
1980	Ambient 3: Day of Radiance	production	Laraaji
1980	Remain in Light	songwriting, production, various instruments, backing vocals, vocal arrangements	Talking Heads
1980	Commercial Album	synthesizer on "The Coming of the Crow"	The Residents
1981	The Pace Setters	production	Edikanfo
1984	Dune	production	Toto
1984	The Unforgettable Fire	various instruments, vocals, treatments	U2
1986	Hybrid	production, synthesizer, treatments, piano, bass, percussion, mix	Michael Brook with Eno and Daniel Lanois
1985	Africana	keyboards	Teresa de Sio
1986	The Falling	production of "Mercy" & "Easy for You"	Carmel
1986	Power Spot	production, bass	Jon Hassell
1987	The Joshua Tree	production, keyboards, programming, backing vocals	U2
1988	Flash of the Spirit	production	Jon Hassell/Farafina
1989	Words for the Dying	production; keyboards on "The Soul of Carmen Miranda"	John Cale
1989	Zvuki Mu	production	Zvuki Mu
1991	Achtung Baby	production (with Dan Lanois), keyboards; string arrangement on "So Cruel"	U2
1991	Exile	production	Geoffrey Oryema
1993	Laid	production, various instruments, vocals	James
1993	Souvlaki	keyboards, treatments	Slowdive
1993	When I Was a Boy	synthesizer, oboe, shaker	Jane Siberry
1993	Zooropa	production, synthesizer, effects, various instruments	U2
1994	Bright Red	production, treatments	Laurie Anderson
1994	Wah Wah	production	James
1995	Outside	synthesizer, treatments	David Bowie
1998	Nomad Soul	production of "Lam Lam"	Baaba Maal
1999	Millionaires	production	James
2000	All That You Can't Leave Behind	production, synthesizer, programming, string arrangement, backing vocals	U2
2000	Faith and Courage	production; piano on "Emma's Song"	Sinéad O'Connor
2000	Now, Always, Never	production, keyboard, vocals	Sikter
2001	Pleased to Meet You	production	James
2005	X&Y	synthesizer on "Low"	Coldplay
2006	Surprise	electronics, sonic landscapes, co-composed three tracks	Paul Simon
2008	Viva la Vida or Death and All His Friends	production, electronics	Coldplay
2008	Hurricane	production, keyboard, backing vocals	Grace Jones
2008	Prospekt's March	production, electronics	Coldplay
2009	No Line on the Horizon	production, synthesizer, programming, vocals	U2
2011	Mylo Xyloto	songwriting, "enoxification" (additional recording input)	Coldplay
2011	From Africa with Fury: Rise	production	Seun Kuti
2014	In Conflict	synthesizer, guitar, vocals	Owen Pallett
2015	A Head Full of Dreams	backing vocals	Coldplay
2017	Altar	production	The Gift
2017	Kaleidoscope	production of "Aliens"	Coldplay
2020	Don't Shy Away	production; synthesizer, programming on "Homing"	Loma
2022	Epica Extension	production, remixing	Jean-Michel Jarre
2023	I/O	production, synthesizer, bells, percussion, "electric worms", guitar, ukulele, programming	Peter Gabriel

=== Executive producer ===
Year	Title	Artist
1974	Fear	John Cale
1976	Music from the Penguin Cafe	Penguin Cafe Orchestra

== See also ==
- Jubilee
