= An Ending =

An Ending could refer to:

- An Ending (Ascent), a song by Brian Eno
- "An Ending", a song from the Undertale soundtrack
