= Hans Friedrich Micheelsen =

Hans Friedrich Micheelsen (9 June 1902 – 23 November 1973) was a German composer and church musician.

Micheelsen's composition instructors included Paul Kickstat and Paul Hindemith. Micheelsen wrote vocal and instrumental music, especially for organ. He primarily composed sacred music, though he did write some secular chamber music. His sacred music is similar to the neo-Baroque music of other contemporary German organist-composers, such as Helmut Walcha and Hugo Distler. His style combined contrapuntal textures, melodies and harmonies drawn from the medieval church modes, and the angular rhythms and meters of the 20th century. Many of his works, including five of his seven Orgelkonzerte (organ concertos), are based on Lutheran chorales.

As a church musician, Micheelsen worked in Brunsbüttel, Berlin, and Hamburg. In addition to his work as an organist, Micheelsen also taught church music. Beginning in 1938, he directed the Kirchenmusikschule der Hamburgischen Landeskirche (Hamburg's regional church music school). When that school merged with the Staatliche Hochschule für Musik (the public music college in Hamburg), Micheelsen became head of its church music department. He taught there until his retirement in 1962.

In 2002, Brian Eno produced an album,18 Keyboard Studies by Hans Friedrich Micheelsen. Roger Eno recorded several of Micheelsen's preludes and short chorale-based works, which Brian then processed to create "a sort of analogy of the variety of organ stops."
