= More Music for Films =

Compilation album by Brian Eno
- Released: 2005
- Genre: Ambient; minimalist
- Label: Astralwerks

Professional ratings
Review scores
Source	Rating
AllMusic	3/5 stars
Pitchfork	6.9/10

More Music for Films is a compilation album by British musician Brian Eno, released in 2005.

== Track listing ==
All music is composed by Brian Eno; except where indicated.

No.	Title	Writer(s)	Length
1.	"Untitled"		2:05
2.	"The Last Door"		1:31
3.	"Chemin de fer"		1:57
4.	"Dark Waters"		1:07
5.	"Fuseli"		1:40
6.	"Melancholy Waltz"		1:46
7.	"Northern Lights"		2:13
8.	"From the Coast"		2:02
9.	"Shell"		1:26
10.	"Empty Landscape"		1:26
11.	"Reactor"		1:40
12.	"The Secret"		1:13
13.	"Don't Look Back"		0:57
14.	"Marseilles"		1:28
15.	"The Dove"		1:25
16.	"Roman Twilight"		3:38
17.	"Dawn, Marshland"		3:14
18.	"Climate Study"	Brian Eno, Daniel Lanois	3:17
19.	"Drift Study"	Brian Eno, Roger Eno, Daniel Lanois	2:33
20.	"Approaching Taidu"	Brian Eno, Daniel Lanois	3:36
21.	"Always Returning (II)"	Brian Eno, Roger Eno	3:09

- Tracks 1–14 originally appeared on the initial 1976 promo-only LP release of Music for Films, and on CD as part of the 1993 release Eno Box I: Instrumental.
- Tracks 15 to 21 originally appeared on the 1983 release Music for Films Volume 2.
- Tracks 5 and 8 originally appeared on the commercial 1978 release of Music for Films as "Patrolling Wire Borders" and "Quartz", respectively.

== Personnel ==
- Brian Eno
- Daniel Lanois

Technical

- Russell Mills - artwork, design, typography
- David Buckland - photography
