= Someday World =

2014 studio album by Brian Eno and Karl Hyde

Studio album by Eno • Hyde
- Released: 5 May 2014
- Genre: Electronic music
- Length: 44:23
- Label: Warp
- Producers: Brian Eno, FRED

Brian Eno chronology
Lux (2012)	Someday World (2014)	High Life (2014)

Karl Hyde chronology
Edgeland (2013)	Someday World (2014)	High Life (2014)

Singles from Someday World
- 1. "Daddy's Car" Released: 7 April 2014

Someday World is an album by the English musicians Brian Eno and Karl Hyde, released on 5 May 2014. The album features musicians including Coldplay's Will Champion, John Reynolds, and Andy Mackay of Roxy Music, and was produced by Eno with Fred Gibson. It was followed two months later by the album High Life.

== Background ==
It was Eno's first album since Lux in 2012 and his first collaboration album since Drums Between the Bells with Rick Holland in 2011. It is also Hyde's second album after Edgeland in 2013, which Eno contributed a remix to. Eno previously worked with Karl Hyde in 2009 as part of Pure Scenius, and in 2011 collaborated with Underworld on the track "Beebop Hurry".

== Reception ==
Someday World received positive reviews from music critics. At Metacritic, which assigns a normalized rating out of 100 to reviews from mainstream critics, the album has received an average score of 62, based on 26 reviews, which indicates "generally favorable reviews".

Professional ratings
Aggregate scores
Source	Rating
Metacritic	62/100
Review scores
Source	Rating
AllMusic	3.5/5 stars
The Arts Desk	4/5 stars
Consequence of Sound	C−
The Guardian	3/5 stars
The Independent	4/5 stars
Mojo	4/5 stars
musicOMH	3/5 stars
Pitchfork	6.2/10
Slant Magazine	3/5 stars
Spin	7/10

== Track listing ==
1. "The Satellites" – 5:33
2. "Daddy's Car" – 4:50
3. "A Man Wakes Up" – 4:17
4. "Witness" – 5:06
5. "Strip It Down" – 4:43
6. "Mother of a Dog" – 5:37
7. "Who Rings the Bell" – 5:05
8. "When I Built This World" – 5:44
9. "To Us All" – 3:28

Special Edition 2CD Disc 2

1. "Big Band Song"
2. "Brazil 3"
3. "Celebration"
4. "Titian Bekh"

== Personnel ==
- Brian Eno – artwork, production, brass, piano, synthesizer, keyboards, bass, guitar, program drums, drums, vocals, background vocals
- Karl Hyde – cover photograph, guitar, vocals, harmonica, tambourine, piano, synthesizer, talking drum, background vocals

Additional musicians and production staff

- Tessa Angus – background vocals
- Will Champion – electronic drums
- Marianna Champion – background vocals
- Nell Catchpole – violin, viola
- Kasia Daszykowska – voice
- Darla Eno – voice
- Don E. – bass synthesizer, clavinet
- Fred Gibson – production, piano, drums, bass, guitar, synthesizer, brass, background vocals
- Georgia Gibson – alto saxophone, tenor saxophone, baritone saxophone
- John Reynolds – drums
- Nick Robertson – design
- Chris Vatalaro – drums
- Andy Mackay – alto saxophone

== Chart positions ==
Chart (2014)	Peak position
Belgian Albums (Ultratop Flanders)	72
Belgian Albums (Ultratop Wallonia)	105
German Albums (Official Top 100)	86
UK Albums (Official Charts)	46
UK Independent Albums (Official Charts)	7
US Billboard 200	194
US Dance/Electronic Albums (Billboard)	6
US Independent Albums (Billboard)	33
US Top Rock Albums (Billboard)	50
