= Edgeland (album) =

Studio album by Karl Hyde
- Released: 22 April 2013
- Recorded: 2012–2013
- Genres: Electronic, ambient, dream pop
- Length: 43:14 (Standard); 61:44 (Deluxe)
- Label: Universal
- Producers: Karl Hyde; Leo Abrahams

Karl Hyde chronology
Edgeland (2013)	Someday World (2014)

Singles from Edgeland
- 1. "Cut Clouds" Released: 24 January 2013; 2. "The Boy with the Jigsaw Puzzle Fingers" Released: 25 February 2013

Edgeland is the debut solo album by Underworld member Karl Hyde. It was released on 22 April 2013 by Universal Music. The album debuted at number 117 on the UK Albums Chart.

== Critical reception ==
Professional ratings
Aggregate scores
Source	Rating
Metacritic	72/100
Review scores
Source	Rating
AllMusic	3.5/5 stars
Clash	7/10
Digital Spy	4/5 stars
Drowned in Sound	8/10
Evening Standard	4/5 stars
Mojo	4/5 stars
musicOMH	4/5 stars
PopMatters	7/10
Record Collector	4/5 stars
Q	4/5 stars

Edgeland received positive reviews from music critics. At Metacritic, which assigns a normalised rating out of 100 to reviews from mainstream critics, the album received an average score of 72, based on 11 reviews, which indicates "generally favorable reviews".

== Track listing ==
All tracks are written by Karl Hyde and Leo Abrahams.

No.	Title	Writer(s)	Producer	Length
1.	"The Night Slips Us Smiling Underneath Its Dress"	Karl Hyde, Leo Abrahams	Karl Hyde, Leo Abrahams	5:14
2.	"Your Perfume Was the Best Thing"	Hyde, Abrahams	Hyde, Abrahams	3:36
3.	"Angel Café"	Hyde, Abrahams	Hyde, Abrahams	3:56
4.	"Cut Clouds"	Hyde, Abrahams	Hyde, Abrahams	3:06
5.	"The Boy with the Jigsaw Puzzle Fingers"	Hyde, Abrahams	Hyde, Abrahams	4:41
6.	"Slummin' It for the Weekend"	Hyde, Abrahams	Hyde, Abrahams	5:46
7.	"Shoulda Been a Painter"	Hyde, Abrahams	Hyde, Abrahams	4:11
8.	"Shadow Boy"	Hyde, Abrahams	Hyde, Abrahams	8:30
9.	"Sleepless"	Hyde, Abrahams	Hyde, Abrahams	4:14

Deluxe edition additional tracks
No.	Title	Writer(s)	Producer	Length
10.	"Dancing on the Graves of Le Corbusier's Dreams"	Hyde, Abrahams	Hyde, Abrahams	3:27
11.	"Final Ray of Sun"	Hyde, Abrahams	Hyde, Abrahams	5:37
12.	"Slummin' It for the Weekend" (Brian Eno mix)	Hyde, Abrahams	Hyde, Abrahams, Brian Eno	5:08
13.	"Cut Clouds" (Figures remix)	Hyde, Abrahams	Hyde, Abrahams	4:20

Deluxe edition additional tracks (Japanese version)
No.	Title	Writer(s)	Producer	Length
10.	"Dancing on the Graves of Le Corbusier's Dreams"	Hyde, Abrahams	Hyde, Abrahams	3:27
11.	"Final Ray of Sun"	Hyde, Abrahams	Hyde, Abrahams	5:37
12.	"Out of Darkness"	Hyde, Abrahams	Hyde, Abrahams	6:18
13.	"Cascading Light"	Hyde, Abrahams	Hyde, Abrahams	3:26
14.	"Slummin' It for the Weekend" (Brian Eno mix)	Hyde, Abrahams	Hyde, Abrahams, Brian Eno	5:08
15.	"Cut Clouds" (Figures remix)	Hyde, Abrahams	Hyde, Abrahams	4:20

== Charts ==
Chart performance for Edgeland
Chart (2013)	Peak position
UK Albums (OCC)	117
