= Music for Films =

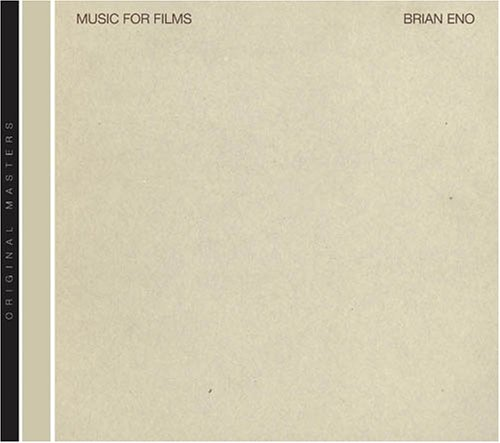

Studio album by Brian Eno
- Released: September 1978
- Recorded: 1975–1978
- Genres: Ambient; experimental
- Length: 40:39
- Label: EG
- Producer: Brian Eno

Brian Eno chronology
After the Heat (1978)	Music for Films (1978)	Ambient 1: Music for Airports (1979)

Professional ratings
Review scores
Source	Rating
AllMusic	5/5 stars
Pitchfork	7.8/10
Q	4/5 stars
The Rolling Stone Album Guide	3/5 stars
Spin Alternative Record Guide	6/10
Tom Hull – on the Web	B
Uncut	4/5 stars
The Village Voice	B+

Music for Films is a solo studio album by the English musician Brian Eno. It was released in September 1978 through EG Records. It charted at #55 in the UK.

== Content ==
Music for Films is a library album of compositions Eno proposed could be licensed for film, television and theatre, including outtakes from his 1975 album Another Green World.

== Release ==
Music for Films was originally released as a limited-edition (five hundred copies) LP in 1976, which was sent to a selection of filmmakers for possible inclusion in their work. Eno said: "I knew that to release a record [of these pieces] in the contemporary critical climate of English rock journalism, you’d just be shot to bits, because it was so contrary to what was going on – these little snippets of something or other, very unaggressive and unattacking."

Many tracks were used in film and television productions over the following years, creating a steady income. According to Eno, one piece was used in around 25 television productions. The EG manager David Enthoven said: "It was a great idea – and a perfect way of getting Eno's music out to the advertising world and so on. It was all Brian's idea. He really was a fabulous salesman."

The commercial Music for Films release was expanded to include a number of pieces for, as Eno put it, "possible use as soundtracks to 'imaginary' films". In fact, excerpts from the album were used in the soundtracks of at least six films:

Film/series	Year	Producer	Track(s)
Sebastiane	1976	Derek Jarman	"Inland Sea", "Quartz", and "Final Sunset"
Alternative 3	1977		"Alternative 3"
Jubilee	1977	Derek Jarman	"Slow Water"
Rock 'n' Roll High School	1979	Michael Finnell	"M386"
Remembrance	1982	Colin Gregg	"Aragon"
A Better Tomorrow	1986	John Woo	"Sparrowfall (1)"

Three further Film albums were released: Music for Films Volume 2 in 1983 (originally only available as a part of the ten-LP box set Working Backwards: 1983-1973), Music for Films III in 1988 (which consisted of work by various artists), and More Music for Films in 2005, which combined tracks from the box set LP along with tracks from the original 1976 limited edition release.

=== Different versions ===
The album has manifested in several forms, featuring different track-listings and track-times.

- 1 : Promotional LP, 1976 (the Director's Edition), issued in a limited number of 500 copies. There are two versions:
  - A test pressing with 25 tracks (where the titles are not given).
  - Official release with 27 tracks. Many of those tracks were taken from Another Green World or appeared later on the official 1978 issue. Essentially all of the 'unreleased' tracks are available on the Music for Fans, Vol. 1 bootleg and – rather more officially – on the Eno Instrumental Box Set.
- 2 : Original 1978 release. The LP packaging featured a matte finish on the outside with a glossy finish on the inside, opposite of standard LP covers at the time.
- 3 : Editions EG reissue. The tracks were rearranged into what Eno felt was a more satisfactory sequence. This is now the "standard" issue. (Note: the cassette version of the Editions EG reissue used the track order from the original 1978 version, though the packaging listed the tracks in the rearranged order.)

"Deep Waters" appears in More Music for Films as "Dark Waters". "Dark Waters" is unpublished elsewhere.

== Track listing ==
Standard edition (1978)

All tracks are written by Brian Eno.

Side one
No.	Title	Length
1.	"M386"	2:49
2.	"Aragon"	1:37
3.	"From the Same Hill"	2:58
4.	"Inland Sea"	1:23
5.	"Two Rapid Formations"	3:24
6.	"Slow Water"	3:16
7.	"Sparrowfall (1)"	1:11
8.	"Sparrowfall (2)"	1:45
9.	"Sparrowfall (3)"	1:23

Side two
No.	Title	Length
1.	"Quartz"	2:02
2.	"Events in Dense Fog"	3:43
3.	"'There Is Nobody'"	1:42
4.	"A Measured Room"	1:41
5.	"Patrolling Wire Borders"	1:02
6.	"Task Force"	1:20
7.	"Alternative 3"	3:11
8.	"Strange Light"	2:08
9.	"Final Sunset"	4:16
Total length:		40:39

== Personnel ==
- Rhett Davies – trumpet on "Strange Light", assistant producer
- John Cale – viola on "Patrolling Wire Borders"
- Rod Melvin – electric piano on "Patrolling Wire Borders"
- Paul Rudolph – guitar on "Aragon", "Patrolling Wire Borders" and "M386"
- Phil Collins – percussion on "Aragon", "Patrolling Wire Borders" and "M386"
- Percy Jones – bass guitar on "Aragon", "A Measured Room" and "M386"
- Robert Fripp – electric guitar on "Slow Water"
- Fred Frith – electric guitar on "Two Rapid Formations" and "Strange Light"
- Bill MacCormick – bass guitar on "Two Rapid Formations"
- Dave Mattacks – percussion on "Two Rapid Formations"
- Ritva Saarikko – cover photograph

== Versions ==
Country	Release date	Label	Media	Cat No.	Notes
UK	1976	EG Records	LP	EGM 1	Promo – 500 copies
UK/France/Aus	Sep 1978	Polydor	LP/Cass	2310 623	
US	Sep 1978	Antilles/Island	LP	AN-7070	
W.Germany	1978	Polydor	LP	2344 123	
UK	1978	Editions EG	LP	EGED 05	
US	1982	Editions EG	LP/Cass	EGS/EGSC 105	"New" track order
Europe	1987	EMI	CD	787189	
US	Nov 1987	Editions EG	CD/Cass	EEGCD/EGEDC-5	
	2005	Virgin/Astralwerks	CD	7243 5 63646 2 2	

== Chart performance ==
Chart (1978–1979)	Peak position
UK Albums Chart	55
New Zealand Albums Chart	27

== See also ==
- Original Soundtracks 1 – a collaboration with U2 that also makes soundtrack music for non-existent films.
