= Lux (Brian Eno album) =

2012 album by Brian Eno

Studio album by Brian Eno
- Released: 13 November 2012
- Genres: Ambient, electronic
- Length: 75:23
- Label: Warp
- Producer: Brian Eno

Brian Eno chronology
Panic of Looking (2011)	Lux (2012)	Someday World (2014)

Lux is the twenty-fifth solo studio album from Brian Eno, released through Warp on 13 November 2012. The album is a collection of ambient soundscapes that have been installed in art galleries and airport terminals. Critical reception has positively compared it with Eno's previous ambient work and noted that it is both relaxing as well as challenging music for those who engage it critically. In 2013, Brian Eno created a number of limited edition prints featuring the cover artwork from Lux made available only from his website.

== Promotion ==
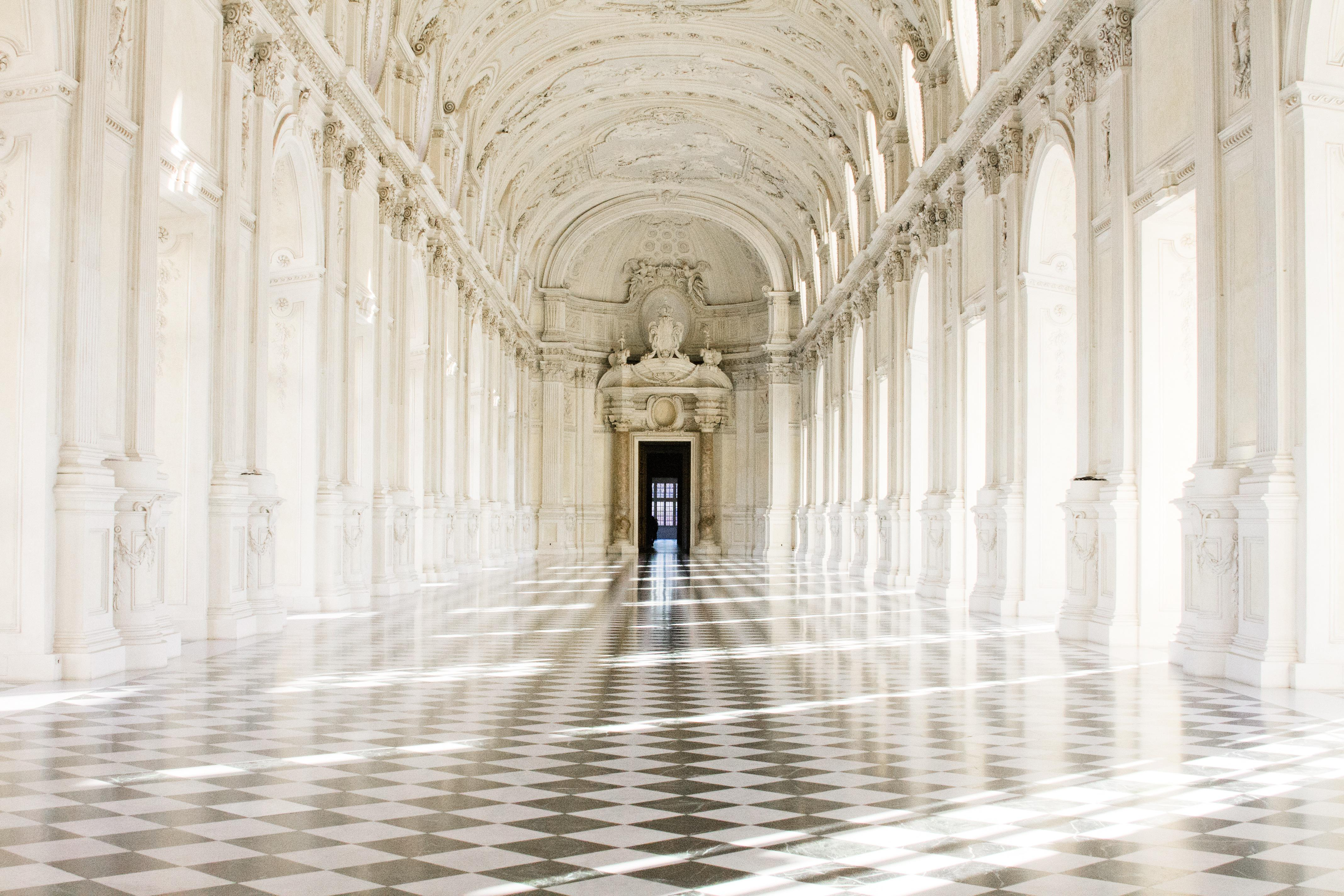
The work was first displayed in the Great Gallery

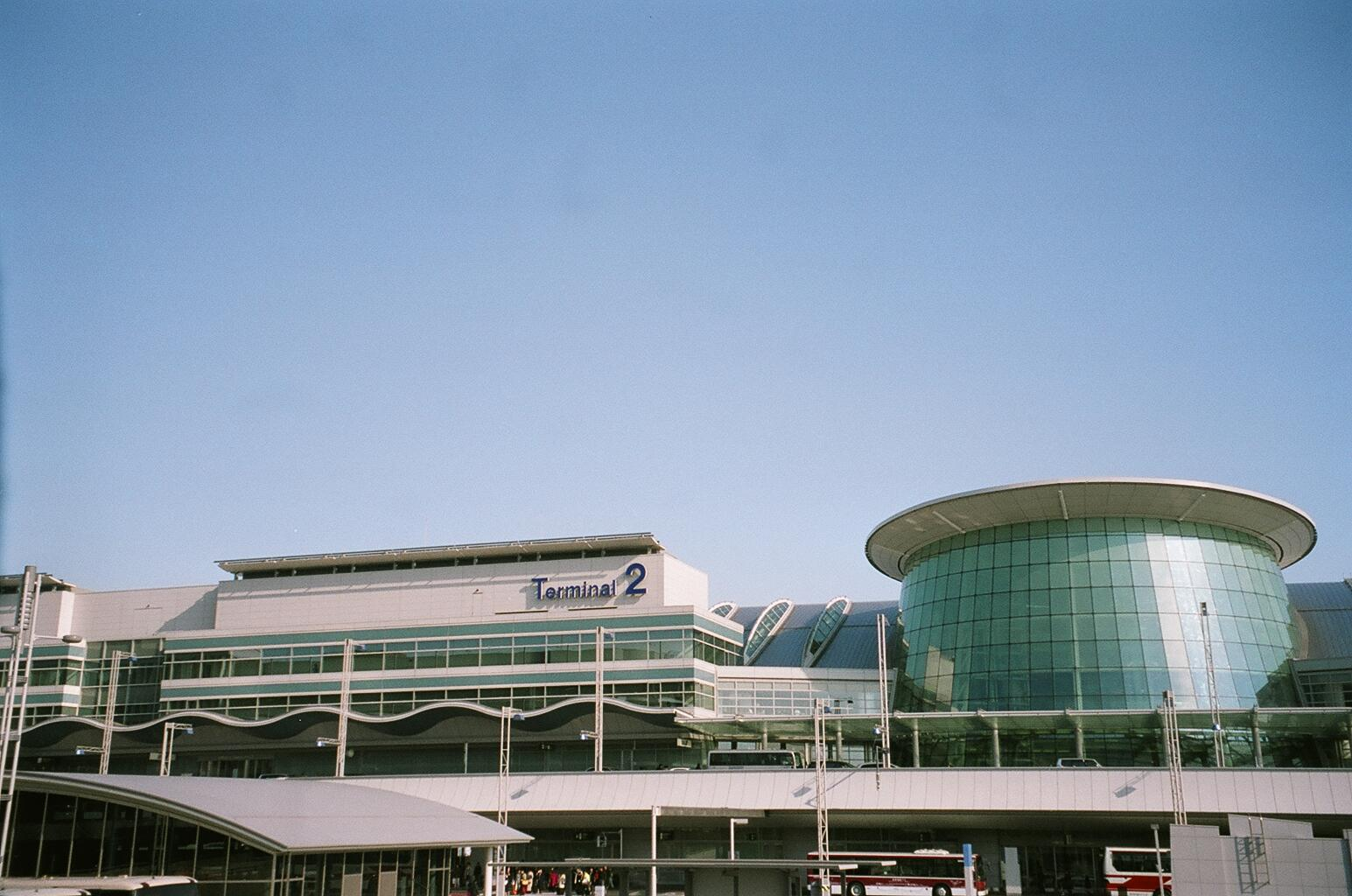
The album played on a loop at Haneda's Terminal 2 for days prior to its commercial release

The music was originally commissioned alongside work in the Great Gallery of the Palace of Venaria in Turin, Italy. To promote the album, Eno attended listening parties in London, New York City, and Sydney. Following in the tradition of Music for Airports, the album was previewed in Tokyo's Haneda Airport for four days prior to the album's commercial release. On 17 November, Eno curated a "Day of Light" promotion on his website where users were encouraged to submit digital photographs under the theme of "play of light" and chose which photos to display to accompany a live stream of Lux.

== Reception ==
Professional ratings
Aggregate scores
Source	Rating
AnyDecentMusic?	7.3/10
Metacritic	75/100
Review scores
Source	Rating
AllMusic	3.5/5 stars
The A.V. Club	B+
Drowned in Sound	8/10
The Guardian	3/5 stars
The Independent	4/5 stars
NME	8/10
The Observer	3/5 stars
Pitchfork	8.0/10
PopMatters	8/10
Slant Magazine	3.5/5 stars

Lux has received largely positive reviews from critics; review aggregator Metacritic has given the album a normalised score of 75 from 31 reviewers indicating that its reception is "generally favorable". Mark Shukla of The Skinny gave the album four out of five stars saying Lux is a return to Eno's ambient roots, concluding "remind us that whilst so called 'ambient music' has mutated in countless ways during the last quarter of a century, Eno's singular ability to elicit its most nourishing qualities remains undiminished." Mark Richardson of Pitchfork considers the album a strong continuation of Eno's ambient work, saying that it is "squarely in the tradition of music that can be ignored but holds up (sometimes just barely) to closer scrutiny."

Several reviewers make explicit reference to Eno's previous ambient work. Drowned in Sound's Marcus J. Moore also compares this album favourably to Eno's Discreet Music, calling him a "master of the ethos" of ambient music. Caroline Sullivan of The Guardian compares it favourably to Music for Airports. Andy Gill of The Independent proclaims that "Lux never bores because it's never making foreground demands on your attention." Writing for Uncut, John Mulvey writes that his ambient efforts are perhaps "the best kind of Eno album", noting the textures of the music are compelling and complicated.

Kitty Empire of The Observer was more subdued, calling the album "an engaging antidote to all the frantic maximalism that the future keeps springing" and awarding it three out of five stars. Darryl Wright of PopMatters found the album more challenging, writing, "this is not dinner music, mood music or even music for a rainy day." Jon Pareles of The New York Times echoes the sentiment by emphasising the tension built into Lux, while NME's Lucy Jones praised the warmth and richness of the album and its ability to subtly shift listeners' moods. The A.V. Club's Jason Heller thought that it compared favourably with previous ambient albums, calling it "a haunting embodiment of one of Eno's greatest paradoxes: music made for specific times and places that captures nothing, evokes nowhere, and is porous enough for nearly any emotion to sift through." Consequence of Sound's Adam Kivel also praises the album's ability to stimulate as well as be background music, stating it "holds up to close listening and background work alike, providing material for deep thinking just as well as the scene in which a character thinks deeply." Slate's Geeta Dayal praised the music's versatility, saying that it was "music for sleeping or waking," but Mark Lore of Paste explains that without the visuals to accompany the music, Lux "meanders while the listener potentially zones in and out."

Andy Beta of Spin gave the album seven out of ten, commenting that "the whole thing is pretty, if a bit mild" and compares it to the 1985 album Thursday Afternoon. Lee Arizuno of The Quietus shared the same comparison and called this his most successful ambient work, saying that it "is a surprisingly rich experience that's difficult to fault." Matthew Phillips of Tiny Mix Tapes describes the subtlety of the music by saying that it "doesn't move the listener so much as suggest directions." Chris Richards of The Washington Post emphasised the profundity of the album saying, "this is music that will make you think about how much time you have in this life and how you might like to spend it."

== Track listing ==
All pieces composed by Brian Eno

1. "LUX 1" – 19:22
2. "LUX 2" – 18:14
3. "LUX 3" – 19:19
4. "LUX 4" – 18:28

== Personnel ==
- Brian Eno – synthesizer, production
- Leo Abrahams – Moog guitar
- Nell Catchpole – viola and violin

== See also ==
- 2012 in music
- Bloom – a generative music app designed by Eno. Concurrent with this album, he also released a follow-up named Scape.
- Installation art
