= Harmonia Ensemble =

Italian chamber music group

The Harmonia Ensemble is an Italian chamber music group started in 1991 under the direction of Giampiero Bigazzi. Beginning as a trio (Orio Odori, clarinet; Damiano Puliti, cello; Alessandra Garosi, keyboards) they have worked with many other musicians in their career. Their repertoire is eclectic, covering music of modern composers, popular, jazz, ethnic styles, and original compositions. Their concerts and albums have featured music by Nino Rota, Gavin Bryars, Frank Zappa, Roger Eno, and the Beatles, among others.

== Recordings ==
- Nino Rota 1992
- In a Room (music of Roger Eno) 1993
- Harmonia meets Zappa (with Roger Eno) 1994
- Events Line 1996
- The North Shore (music of Gavin Bryars) 1999
- Fellini: L’Uomo dei Sogni 2001
- Gypsies 2001
- Ulixes (with Kočani Orkestar) 2001
- Yellow Penguin 2016
