= Curiosities Volume 1 =

Curiosities Volume I

Compilation album by Brian Eno
- Released: 2003
- Genre: Experimental, electronic, ambient
- Length: 54:13
- Label: Opal Ltd.
- Producer: Brian Eno

Curiosities Volume I is an album by English musician Brian Eno, released in 2003 by record label Opal Ltd. It is the first in a series of albums compiling Eno's previously unreleased recordings.

== Track listing ==
All songs written by Brian Eno, except "Manila Envelope", by Eno and Robert Fripp.

1. "Select a Bonk" – 5:23
2. "Draw One Animal" – 3:09
3. "Ambient Savage" – 3:53
4. "Circus Mathematics" – 1:38
5. "Castro Haze" – 4:48
6. "Groan Wash" – 3:56
7. "Cheeky Hop" – 3:29
8. "Work/Wank" – 2:02
9. "Late Evening in Jersey" – 4:37
10. "Slow Lump with Strings" – 4:55
11. "Never Tunneling" – 3:36
12. "My Lonely Organ" – 3:58
13. "Weird Bird Call Carnival" – 1:13
14. "War Fetish" – 2:00
15. "Manila Envelope" (with Robert Fripp) – 5:27

== Personnel ==
- Brian Eno – performer
- Robert Fripp – performer on "Manila Envelope"
- Richard Bailey – drums on "Castro Haze"

Technical

- Marlon Weyeneth – researching and compilation
