= The Drop (album) =

Studio album by Brian Eno
- Released: 7 July 1997
- Recorded: 1996
- Genre: Ambient
- Length: 74:00
- Label: All Saints
- Producer: Brian Eno

Brian Eno chronology
Original Soundtracks 1 (1995)	The Drop (1997)	Extracts from Music for White Cube (1997)

Professional ratings
Review scores
Source	Rating
AllMusic	2.5/5 stars
Drowned in Sound	7/10
Entertainment Weekly	B
The Guardian	2/5 stars
NME	0/10
Pitchfork	3.6/10
PopMatters	9/10
Rolling Stone	3/5 stars
The Village Voice	C

The Drop is the fourteenth solo studio album by Brian Eno, released on 7 July 1997 through All Saints Records. The album continues in the same style as much of his work of the period exploring impressionistic, ambient instrumental soundscapes rather than more conventional songwriting. The 2014 reissue includes the 77 Million Paintings album as a bonus disc and edits the track "Iced World" from its original 32 minutes down to 18 minutes – the same duration on both vinyl and CD.

Originally, the album was titled Unwelcome Jazz: "jazz that nobody asked for, and many did not care for."

== Marketing ==
Eno managed the album's global marketing campaign from his then-new home in St. Petersburg, Russia, where he had taken leave from his teaching in London and worked on other projects. He used email to conduct interviews with the press and communication with his UK-based publicity firm, Celebration. In one of the press emails, Eno said of The Drop: "There are lots of melodies, although they move in an angular and slightly irrational fashion. They keep changing direction, trying to find out where they are going. I don’t want to do something that’s well covered by a lot of other people. My pleasure and pride is in discovering new places for music to go."

== Critical reception ==
Reviewing for The Village Voice in December 1997, Robert Christgau wrote: "Ever the bullshitter, the St. Petersburg (Russia) muso cites as influences Me'Shell NdegéOcello, [Fela Kuti], and the Mahavishnu Orchestra, and as an admirer of all three I only wish I could hear the way musos hear. To me it sounds like he got stuck between Music for Airports and Wrong Way Up and spun his hard drive for 74 minutes. He hears melodies whose vagueness he extols, I hear vaguenesses whose attenuation I rue. He hears bass lines, I hear tinkle. He hears 'sourness,' I hear more tinkle."

== Track listing ==
No.	Title	Length
1.	"Slip, Dip"	2:18
2.	"But If"	1:48
3.	"Belgian Drop"	1:56
4.	"Cornered"	2:02
5.	"Block Drop"	2:50
6.	"Out/Out"	1:51
7.	"Swanky"	2:50
8.	"Coasters"	2:55
9.	"Blissed"	2:53
10.	"M.C. Organ"	2:54
11.	"Boomcubist"	2:07
12.	"Hazard"	2:15
13.	"Rayonism"	2:55
14.	"Dutch Blur"	3:02
15.	"Back Clack"	3:19
16.	"Dear World"	3:16
17.	"Iced World"	32:48
