= Lateral (album) =

Studio album by Brian Eno and Beatie Wolfe
- Released: 6 June 2025
- Genres: Ambient; instrumental; minimalism; electronic
- Length: 64:01
- Label: Verve
- Producers: Brian Eno; Beatie Wolfe

Brian Eno and Beatie Wolfe chronology
Luminal (2025)	Lateral (2025)	Liminal (2025)

Lateral is a 2025 collaborative studio album by Brian Eno and Beatie Wolfe, described by the pair as "Space Music".

Each album cover of the trilogy features Brian Eno’s colorful light painting etchings.

== Critical reception ==
Professional ratings
Review scores
Source	Rating
AllMusic	3.5/5 stars
Classic Pop	4/5 stars
Classic Rock	4/5 stars
Mojo	4/5 stars
Pitchfork	7.0/10
Prog	4/5 stars
Rolling Stone	4/5 stars
The Times	4/5 stars
Uncut	8/10

The Times placed the combination of Lateral and Luminal amongst its list of "the best albums of 2025", claiming Lateral is "deeply calming in its crystalline simplicity".The album also made the best of 2025 lists for the following publications and streaming sites: Classic Pop, BrooklynVegan, Amazon Music and Spotify.

In July 2026, a special edit of Big Empty Country was announced as part of Los Angeles County Museum of Art's new David Geffen Galleries following curatorial input from KCRW. The music can be heard at the Peter Zumthor bench and offers a contemplative place to pause.

== Track listing ==
All tracks are written by Beatie Wolfe, Brian Eno.

Lateral vinyl track listing
No.	Title	Side	Length
1.	"Big Empty Country (Day)"	A	24:40
2.	"Big Empty Country (Night)"	B	24:32
Total length:			49:12

Lateral CD track listing
No.	Title	Length
1.	"Big Empty Country"	64:01
Total length:		64:01

== Personnel ==
- Brian Eno: synthesizers, keyboards
- Beatie Wolfe: guitars, synthesizers, keyboards

=== Technical personnel ===
- Produced by Brian Eno and Beatie Wolfe
- Mastered by Dean Martin Hovey

=== Artwork and packaging ===
Design by Beatie Wolfe, Brian Eno, and Nick Robertson, using the original art 'Samh’ (2023) by Brian Eno. Released as CD, black vinyl and exclusive lime coloured biovinyl manufactured using eco-friendly materials

== Charts ==
Chart performance for Lateral
Chart (2025)	Peak position
Scottish Albums (Official Charts)	32
UK Album Downloads (Official Charts)	95
