= Liminal (Beatie Wolfe and Brian Eno album) =

2025 studio album

Studio album by Beatie Wolfe and Brian Eno
- Released: 10 October 2025
- Genres: Avant-pop; ambient; art rock; ambient pop; electronic; experimental rock
- Length: 45:56
- Label: Verve
- Producers: Brian Eno; Beatie Wolfe

Beatie Wolfe and Brian Eno chronology
Luminal / Lateral (2025)	Liminal (2025)

Liminal is the third collaborative studio album by Beatie Wolfe and Brian Eno, released 10 October 2025. and described by the pair as "Dark Matter" music.

== Critical reception ==
Professional ratings
Aggregate scores
Source	Rating
Metacritic	78/100
Review scores
Source	Rating
AllMusic	3.5/5 stars
Mojo	4/5 stars
Uncut	8/10

Liminal has received positive reviews with MOJO magazine praising it for "pushing open the portal..." and likening its sound to "the Velvet Underground gone West", Billboard celebrating it as "an act of hope and a rallying cry rendered in soft synths, and Far Out Magazine writing "Liminal unveils a strange beckoning power, inhabiting a fascinating digital realm of cerebral terrain."

== Track listing ==
All tracks are written by Beatie Wolfe, Brian Eno.

Liminal track listing
No.	Title	Length
1.	"Part of Us"	5:16
2.	"Ringing Ocean"	3:30
3.	"The Last to Know"	2:27
4.	"Procession"	3:20
5.	"Little Boy"	4:13
6.	"Flower Women"	4:20
7.	"Shallow Form"	3:19
8.	"Before Life"	4:23
9.	"Laundry Room"	4:36
10.	"Corona"	3:54
11.	"Shudder Like Crows"	3:30
Total length:		42:58

== Personnel ==
- Beatie Wolfe: vocals, guitars, omnichord, synthesizers, keys, melodica
- Brian Eno: backing vocals, synthesizers, keys, slide guitar, bass, omnichord

=== Technical personnel ===
- Written and performed by Beatie Wolfe and Brian Eno
- Produced by Brian Eno and Beatie Wolfe
- Mastered by Dean Martin Hovey
- Vinyl Lacquer Cut by Jeff Powell

=== Artwork and packaging ===
Design by Nick Robertson, Beatie Wolfe and Brian Eno, using the original art 'Elgar' by Brian Eno.

== Charts ==
Chart performance for Liminal
Chart (2025)	Peak position
Scottish Albums (Official Charts)	76
