= Luminal (album) =

Studio album by Beatie Wolfe and Brian Eno
- Released: 6 June 2025
- Genres: Avant-pop; ambient; art rock; ambient pop; electronic; experimental rock
- Length: 45:56
- Label: Verve
- Producers: Brian Eno; Beatie Wolfe

Beatie Wolfe and Brian Eno chronology
Lateral (2025)	Luminal (2025)	Liminal (2025)

Luminal is a 2025 collaborative studio album by Beatie Wolfe and Brian Eno, described by the pair as "Dream Music".

Each album cover of the trilogy features Brian Eno’s colorful light painting etchings.

== Critical reception ==
Professional Ratings
Review scores
Source	Rating
AllMusic	3.5/5 stars
Classic Pop	4/5 stars
Classic Rock	4/5 stars
Mojo	4/5 stars
Pitchfork	3.5/5 stars
Prog	4/5 stars
Rolling Stone	4/5 stars
The Times	4/5 stars
Uncut	4/5 stars

The Times placed the combination of Luminal and Lateral amongst its list of "the best albums of 2025 so far", claiming Luminal is "deeply calming in its crystalline simplicity". Prog singles out "Wolfe's honeyed and breathy vocals [that] carry verses, choruses and lyrics, with a number of the songs rooted in American vernacular music."

== Track listing ==
All tracks are written by Beatie Wolfe, Brian Eno.

Luminal track listing
No.	Title	Length
1.	"Milky Sleep"	3:19
2.	"Hopelessly at Ease"	3:41
3.	"My Lovely Days"	4:44
4.	"Play On"	5:55
5.	"Shhh"	4:45
6.	"Suddenly"	3:35
7.	"A Ceiling and a Lifeboat"	3:13
8.	"And Live Again"	4:18
9.	"Breath March"	3:09
10.	"Never Was It Now"	4:35
11.	"What We Are"	4:45
Total length:		45:56

== Personnel ==
- Beatie Wolfe: vocals, guitars, omnichord, synthesizers, keys, melodica
- Brian Eno: backing vocals, synthesizers, keys, slide guitar, bass, omnichord

=== Technical personnel ===
- Written and performed by Beatie Wolfe and Brian Eno
- Produced by Brian Eno and Beatie Wolfe
- Mastered by Dean Martin Hovey
- Vinyl Lacquer Cut by Jeff Powell

=== Artwork and packaging ===
Design by Nick Robertson, Beatie Wolfe and Brian Eno, using the original art 'Dimidium' by Brian Eno.

== Charts ==
Chart performance for Luminal
Chart (2025)	Peak position
Scottish Albums (Official Charts)	33
