= Music for Films Volume 2 =

Compilation album by Brian Eno
- Released: 1983
- Genre: Ambient
- Length: 42:34
- Label: E.G. Records

Brian Eno chronology
Apollo: Atmospheres and Soundtracks (1983)	Music for Films Volume 2 (1983)	The Pearl (1984)

Professional ratings
Review scores
Source	Rating
AllMusic	link

Music for Films Volume 2 is a compilation album by Brian Eno. On the back cover, Eno states, "I released the first volume of Music for Films in 1978, and it contained samples of my work, spanning the period of 1975–78. This second volume picks up where the first left off, but is somewhat different in that it contains fewer pieces with greater average length."

The majority of tracks also appear on Apollo: Atmospheres and Soundtracks (1983). The remaining tracks that were unique to this release were later reissued on the 2005 compilation More Music for Films.

== Track listing ==
=== Side A ===
1. "The Dove" – 1:30
2. "Roman Twilight" – 3:45
3. "Matta" – 2:25
4. "Dawn, Marshland" – 3:00
5. "Climate Study" – 3:20
6. "The Secret Place" – 3:00
7. "An Ending" – 3:45

=== Side B ===
1. "Always Returning I" – 4:30
2. "Signals" – 4:00
3. "Under Stars" – 4:25
4. "Drift Study" – 2:29
5. "Approaching Taidu" – 3:20
6. "Always Returning II" – 3:05
