= Drums Between the Bells =

Studio album by Brian Eno
- Released: 4 July 2011
- Recorded: 2003–2011
- Genres: Electronic, experimental, ambient, spoken word
- Label: Warp

Brian Eno chronology
| Small Craft on a Milk Sea (2010) | Drums Between the Bells (2011) | Panic of Looking (2011) |

Drums Between the Bells is the twenty-fourth solo studio album by Brian Eno, released on 4 July 2011 on Warp Records in CD, double CD 'hardback', double vinyl and download editions. The album is based on the words of poet Rick Holland. "Glitch" was released in advance of the album, through Eno's mailing list in April 2011.

In 2012 it was awarded a silver certification from the Independent Music Companies Association which indicated sales of at least 20,000 copies throughout Europe. As well as Eno and Holland, the album features the voices of Grazyna Goworek, Caroline Wildi, Laura Spagnuolo, Elisha Mudly Aylie Cooke, Nick Robertson, and Anastasia Afonina. The album's design and art direction was credited to Nick Robertson, and its imagery to Eno & Robertson.

== Background ==
Brian Eno met Rick Holland in the late 1990s, through the collaborative 'Map-Making' project. After creating their first music together in 2003, they met infrequently to work on new compositions. Following the release of Eno's Small Craft on a Milk Sea in 2010, the pair decided to complete their project. Drums Between the Bells is the result of their meetings (although their 2003 work does not appear on this album).

== Critical reception ==
Dave Simpson wrote in The Guardian, "In David Byrne's tour film, Ride, Rise, Roar, Brian Eno admits he doesn't really like lyrics, and in the accompanying notes for this [album], he admits the 'liberation' of realising that a song needn't involve singing. Hence this album of musical speech, which involves Eno sculpting music around voices he likes, from poet Rick Holland, to a woman he met on the street near the studio, and a lady from the local health club. Although this sounds as if he is taking the mickey, the results are often rather highbrow. "Glitch"'s motorik electronics and "Seedpods'''s airy grooves are compelling, but at times it feels as if Eno is stubbornly working against himself."

In Rolling Stone, Barry Walters wrote: "The veteran super-producer is also the father of ambient music, yet nothing hogs a sonic stage like someone talking. Enter British poet Rick Holland, whose concise, alliterative abstraction conveys an innate musicality. Playing most of the accompaniment himself, Eno surrounds a small cast of speakers (barring strong accents and precise diction) with sounds that recall Eno’s career highlights. The mournful guitar melodies of “Pour It Out” and “A Title” evoke Another Green World’s placid intricacies while simpler, piano-led tracks like “Dreambirds” are bathed in clouds of echo that suggest Music For Airports."

For the BBC Wyndham Wallace wrote: "This latest, a collaboration with poet Rick Holland, is arguably as exciting as anything [Eno]'s done for a while. ... It is, frankly, classic Eno. Holland too emerges from it well, though his contributions tend to be less immediate."

Professional ratings
Aggregate scores
| Source | Rating |
|---|---|
| Metacritic | 68/100 |
Review scores
| Source | Rating |
| AllMusic | 4/5 stars |
| The A.V. Club | B− |
| The Guardian | 3/5 stars |
| Paste | 8.7/10 |
| Pitchfork | 6.6/10 |
| Rolling Stone | 3/5 stars |
| Slant | 3.5/5 stars |
| Spin | 5/10 |
| Sputnikmusic | 4/5 |
| Tiny Mix Tapes | 3.5/5 stars |

== Track listing ==
All compositions by Brian Eno, with poems written by Rick Holland.

Disc one

1. "Bless This Space"
2. "Glitch"
3. "Dreambirds"
4. "Pour It Out"
5. "Seedpods"
6. "The Real"
7. "The Airman"
8. "Fierce Aisles of Light"
9. "As If Your Eyes Were Partly Closed as If You Honed the Swirl Within Them and Offered Me the World"
10. "A Title"
11. "Sounds Alien"
12. "Dow"
13. "Instant Gold" (iTunes Store bonus track)
14. "Multimedia"
15. "In the Future" (Japan CD bonus track)
16. "Cloud 4"
17. "Silence"
18. "Breath of Crows"

Disc two (instrumentals; limited edition only)

1. "Seeded"
2. "Pour"
3. "Bird Dreaming"
4. "Itch"
5. "Fiercer Aisles"
6. "Real"
7. "Spaced"
8. "Dense Air"
9. "Another Title"
10. "Nikkei"
11. "Cloud 5"
12. "Alienated"
13. "As If Your Eyes"
14. "Monomedia"
15. "Crows"
