= Extracts from Music for White Cube, London 1997 =

Extracts from Music for White Cube

Studio album by Brian Eno
- Released: 1997
- Recorded: March 1997
- Genre: Ambient
- Length: 68:30
- Label: Opal
- Producer: Brian Eno

Brian Eno chronology
The Drop (1997)	Extracts from Music for White Cube (1997)	Lightness: Music for the Marble Palace (1997)

Professional ratings
Review scores
Source	Rating
AllMusic	3/5 stars

Extracts from Music for White Cube, London 1997 is the fifteenth solo studio album from British musician Brian Eno, released in 1997.

== Overview ==
The album is an Opal release, with no catalogue number.

The music on the album was made for an Installation—a show featuring music and visuals—that took place at the White Cube art gallery in London, from 25 April to 31 May 1997.

The gallery describes itself as "possibly the smallest exhibition space in Europe", and consists of a simple square room, painted white. During the show, white blinds covered the two windows in one wall and a suspended ceiling muffled lights that were suspended above it. Mounted on each of the four walls was a CD-player with two speakers on either side, playing random tracks.

Eno created the music by selecting random sites situated within a one-mile radius of the White Cube and recording a variety of ambient sounds around him, such as crowd-noise, the ringing bells of clock-towers, weather and rushing traffic. On top of this he also recorded himself singing a single, long note at each location.

Taking the raw recordings back to his London studio, he ran them through a variety of enhancement software/hardware to produce a series of time-stretched, compressed, equalised, reverberating compositions, which he burned onto CDs (8 to 16 tracks on each). These were the discs that were fed into the Installation players and set to 'random'. Eno says "I was thinking of the sound less as music and more as sculpture, space, landscape, and of the experience as a process of immersion rather than just of listening."

The Extracts from Music for White Cube album was originally the "catalogue" to accompany the Installation, which has a short essay on the inlay card. During the Installation's run at the White Cube gallery, visitors could also select from, and buy, a series of unique CD-Rs named Contra 1.2. These varied in length from around 20 to 50 minutes, and the music was created with Koan's music-generation software.

Documents from the installation can be found in the White Cube Archives, located in London, UK.

== Track listing ==
1. "Notting Hill, 20 Feb" – 11:45
2. "Old Brompton Road, 20 Feb" – 3:09
3. "The Oval, 24 Feb" – 7:07
4. "Regents Park, 1 Feb" – 24:33
5. "Barbican Station, 24 Feb" – 1:39
6. "Bermondsey, 24 Feb" – 4:20
7. "Kentish Town, 29 Jan" – 2:39
8. "Lavender Hill, 14 Feb" – 6:57
9. "Camden Town, 24 Feb" – 6:18
