= Lightness: Music for the Marble Palace – The State Russian Museum, St. Petersburg =

Lightness: Music for the Marble Palace

Studio album by Brian Eno
- Released: 1997 & 2000
- Recorded: 1997
- Genre: Ambient
- Length: 55:40
- Label: Opal
- Producer: Brian Eno

Brian Eno chronology
| Extracts from Music for White Cube (1997) | Lightness: Music for the Marble Palace (1997) | I Dormienti (1999) |

Professional ratings
Review scores
| Source | Rating |
|---|---|
| AllMusic | 3/5 stars |

"Lightness" (subtitled: Music for the Marble Palace – The State Russian Museum, St. Petersburg) is the sixteenth solo studio album by Brian Eno, released in 1997, and re-released in 2000 by Opal Music. The music on the album was made for an Installation—a show featuring music and visuals—that took place at the Marble Palace in Saint Petersburg, which accommodates permanent exhibitions of the State Russian Museum, from November to mid-December 1997.

This album should not be confused with a 1976 bootleg named Music For Palaces. In May 2005, Eno premiered his then-new album Another Day on Earth at the same venue.

== Overview ==
After the release of his 1997 album The Drop, Eno relocated to Saint Petersburg for a short sabbatical and began working on music specifically for installations. The event's music was generated by three CD players, and like his previous album of the same year, Extracts from Music for White Cube, it used the generative capabilities of Koan Pro by layering more than two stereo pairs of sound sources, via the CD players.

The show was hosted in a large, neo-classical, newly renovated chamber, and Eno was free to design it as he wished. At one end, computer-programmed projectors threw randomized, colourful patterns on a series of screens, while the rest of the room was dark.

He described the Marble Palace event as a "mixture of cinema, fireworks display, environmental music and installation". The edited highlights that feature on the CD are described as "a 1-hour selection of a hypothetically endless piece".

== Track listing ==
1. "Atmospheric Lightness" - 30:40
2. "Chamber Lightness" - 25:00
