= Beatie Wolfe =

Anglo-American artist and composer

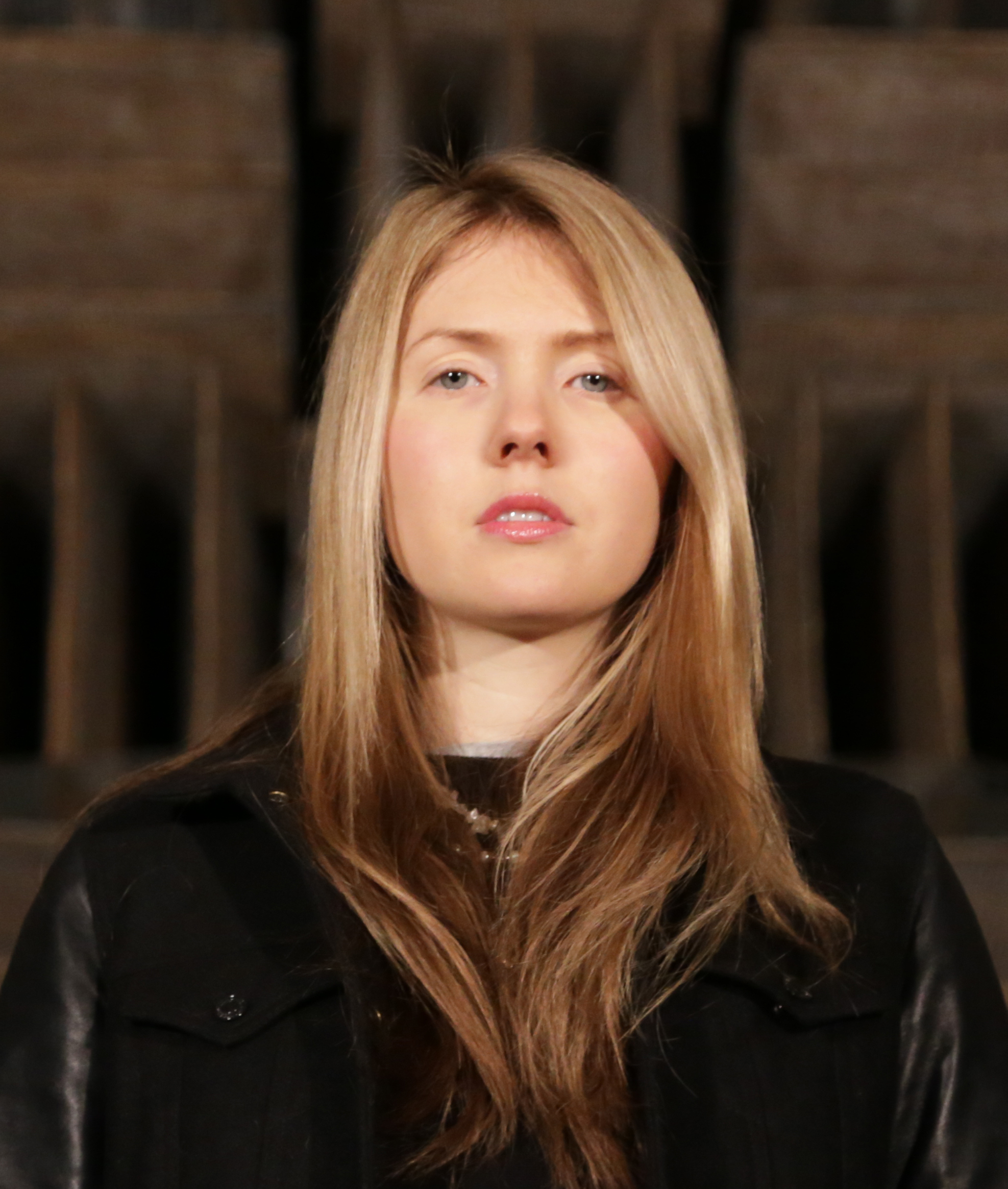
- Wolfe in the Bell Labs Anechoic Chamber in 2017
- Born: London, United Kingdom
- Education: Goldsmiths, University of London
- Occupations: Conceptual artist; composer; producer; activist
- Years active: 2012–present
- Notable work: From Green to Red • Smoke and Mirrors • Raw Space • E.A.T. • imPRINTING
- Awards: Prix Ars Electronica (Golden Nica Award) | Webby Awards (Anthem Prize)
- Musical career
- Genres: Avant-pop; ambient; art rock; indie rock; electronic
- Instruments: Vocals; guitar; keyboards; piano; synthesizers; bass
- Works: Luminal; Lateral; Liminal
- Website: www.beatiewolfe.com

Beatie Wolfe is an Anglo-American conceptual artist and composer. She is described as a "musical weirdo and visionary" known for seeing music differently and creating new formats for music and art in the digital era.

Her projects include a space broadcast via the Holmdel Horn Antenna, the world's first 360° AR live-stream, a visualization of 800,000 years of CO_{2} levels and a "visceralisation" of methane data set against big oil advertisements.

Wolfe was selected to reboot the historic Bell Labs program Experiments in Art and Technology which began with John Cage and Andy Warhol. Wolfe's work has been featured internationally at United Nations COP26, the Nobel Prize Summit, the Victoria and Albert Museum, The New York Times Climate Summit, the London Design Biennale, TEDMED, Somerset House, SXSW, Museum of Science (Boston), MIT Media Lab, Cent Quatre, Ars Electronica museum, and the Barbican. Wired selected Wolfe as one of 22 changing the world, she is a winner of Prix Ars Electronica's Golden Nica Award, two Anthem Awards, a Falling Walls finalist and UN Women chose Wolfe as one of nine innovators for a global campaign for International Women's Day.

Wolfe is also the co-founder of a "profound" research project looking at the Power of Music for people living with dementia. The artist has collaborated with artists such as Brian Eno (where they recorded three albums together), Mark Mothersbaugh of Devo, Laraaji, Michael Stipe of R.E.M., Allee Willis and producer Linda Perry.

== Early life ==
Wolfe was born in South London to an English journalist mother and an American bookseller father. She attended the Young Blood Theatre group at the Riverside Studios between 2000 and 2004, where she wrote and performed in a number of plays at the Riverside Theatre and Lyric Theatre. Her first musical instrument was the keyboard at age 6–7, which she primarily used for composing; she later took up the guitar at 13–14, which became her main instrument. Her first band was called Aurum (latin for "gold"). Wolfe attended Ibstock Place School. Following Ibstock, she attended Goldsmiths, University of London, where she studied English literature. For her dissertation, Wolfe wrote about Canadian singer-songwriter Leonard Cohen.

== Notable projects ==
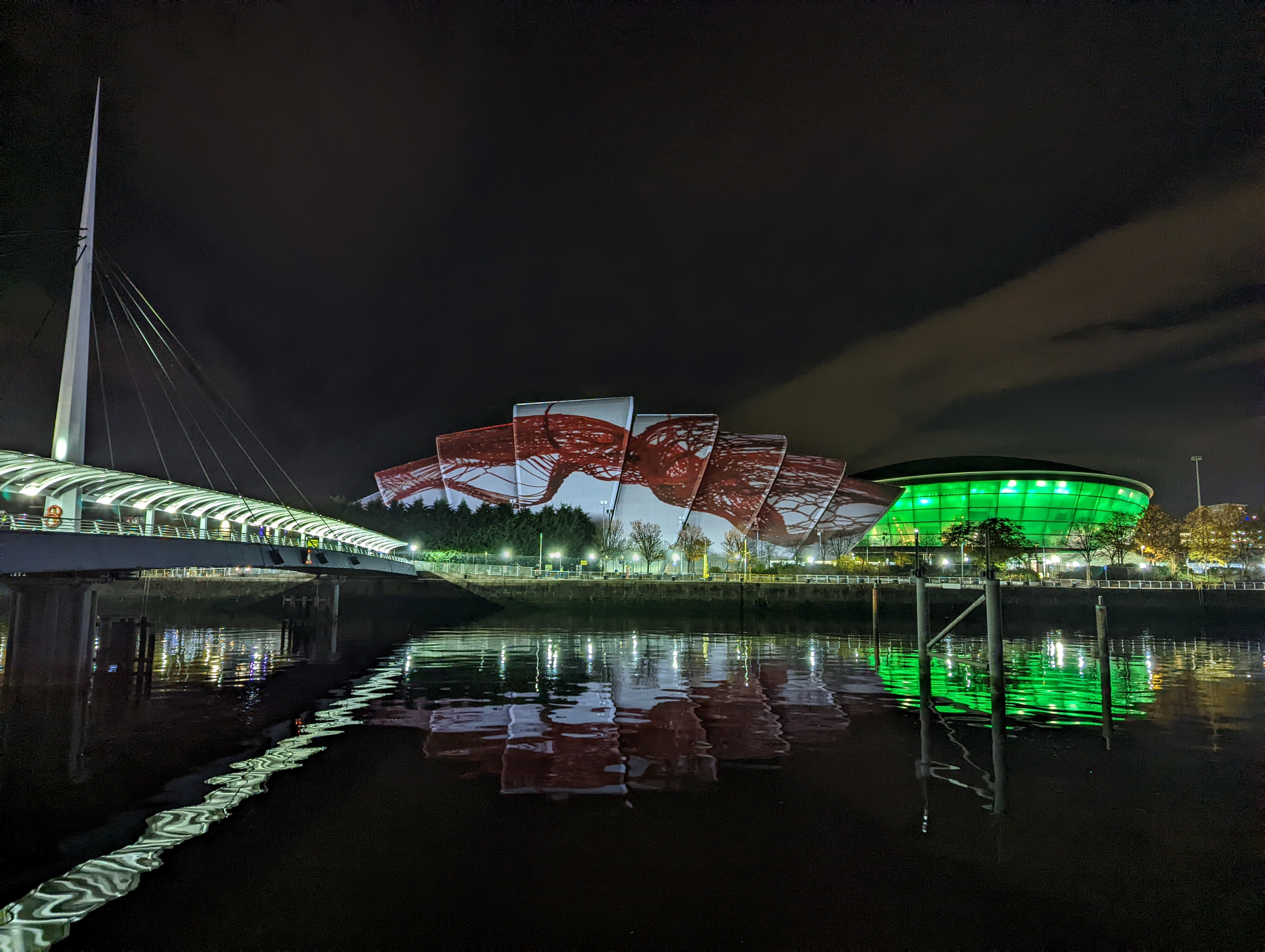
The UN project Beatie Wolfe's From Green to Red at COP26

=== Theatre For the Palm of the Hand (8ight) ===
In 2013, Wolfe created her first album innovation by turning the mobile phone into a “theatre for the palm of the hand”. This "world' first" format was positively received by various critics such as Wired magazine, who described it as an "ingenious 3D layered view that beautifully brings to life her captivating folk sounds" and British British GQ magazine, who stated that Wolfe "continues to innovate with her beautiful new album 8ight". Several magazines noted that Wolfe was "the first artist to introduce the Palm Top Theatre to her product". Following her 3D interactive app release, Apple invited Wolfe to perform at its worldwide flagship event theaters – London, New York, and Berlin.

=== Album deck of intelligent cards ===
In addition to the musical jacket, Montagu Square was released as the world's first NFC Album Deck in collaboration with MOO. The Next Web called this release "a brilliant inspiring idea that transcends novelty" and Wired called it "bleeding edge". The Montagu Square album deck comes as a pack of printed cards, with each card corresponding to each track from the album and featuring artwork, lyrics and an embedded near-field communication (NFC) chip – allowing listeners to tap the song cards onto their phone to play the music and access its content.

=== The album jacket (Montagu Square) ===
Following on the innovations of 8ight, Montagu Square was released as a woven album jacket made by tailor Michael Fish. Wolfe recorded the album at 34 Montagu Square, Marylebone, the former home of Jimi Hendrix, Paul McCartney, Ringo Starr, John Lennon and Yoko Ono, and in the room where "The Wind Cries Mary" and "Eleanor Rigby" had been written. Wolfe's live recording – complete with its ambient sound, resonance of the room – was translated into a woven fabric and cut by Michael Fish (who dressed Jimi Hendrix, David Bowie, and Mick Jagger in the 1960s and 1970s) as the first musical jacket of its kind. The jacket has been NFC-enabled, allowing people to hear the music by tapping their phone onto the fabric. Wolfe's jacket has been featured in the Evening Standard, Craft Magazine, Creative Review, Huffington Post, Wired, Forbes, Recode, The Next Web, Tech Crunch and Fast Company. Tech Crunch called the musical jacket "spectacular" and praised Wolfe for "making music physical again, in a very literal way".

=== Raw Space galactic broadcast ===
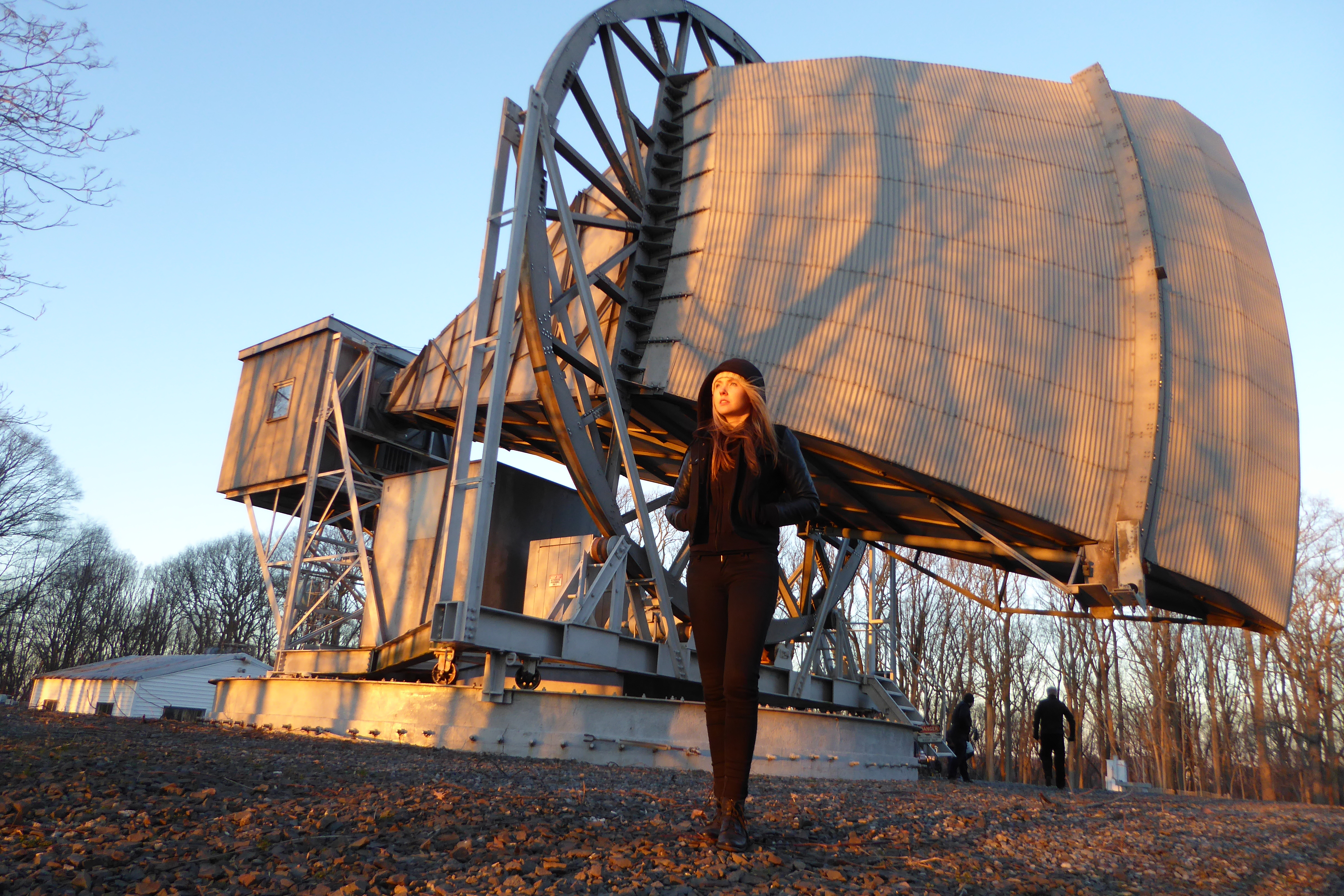
Wolfe at the Holmdel Horn Antenna from which she broadcast music into Space

On 26 September 2017, Wolfe broadcast her album Raw Space into space via the Holmdel Horn Antenna and with Nobel Laureate Robert Woodrow Wilson. Robert Woodrow Wilson made an update to the horn to ensure Wolfe's music got past the Earth's atmosphere and into space, making this the first music broadcast into space using the Holmdel Horn Antenna.

=== Live generative AR performance ===
In addition to the live stream, Wolfe also pioneered the world's first live, generative augmented reality performance for songs "Little Moth" and "As You" as part of the launch of Raw Space. This was achieved by using Kinect's motion-sensing devices to track Wolfe's movements in the chamber and allow the augmented reality animation to respond to her specific location in real time. New Scientist described this as "an enchanting effect", with the song's lyrics streaming out of her mouth as her sung and the graphics following her round the room in real time.

=== Live 360° AR stream (Raw Space) ===
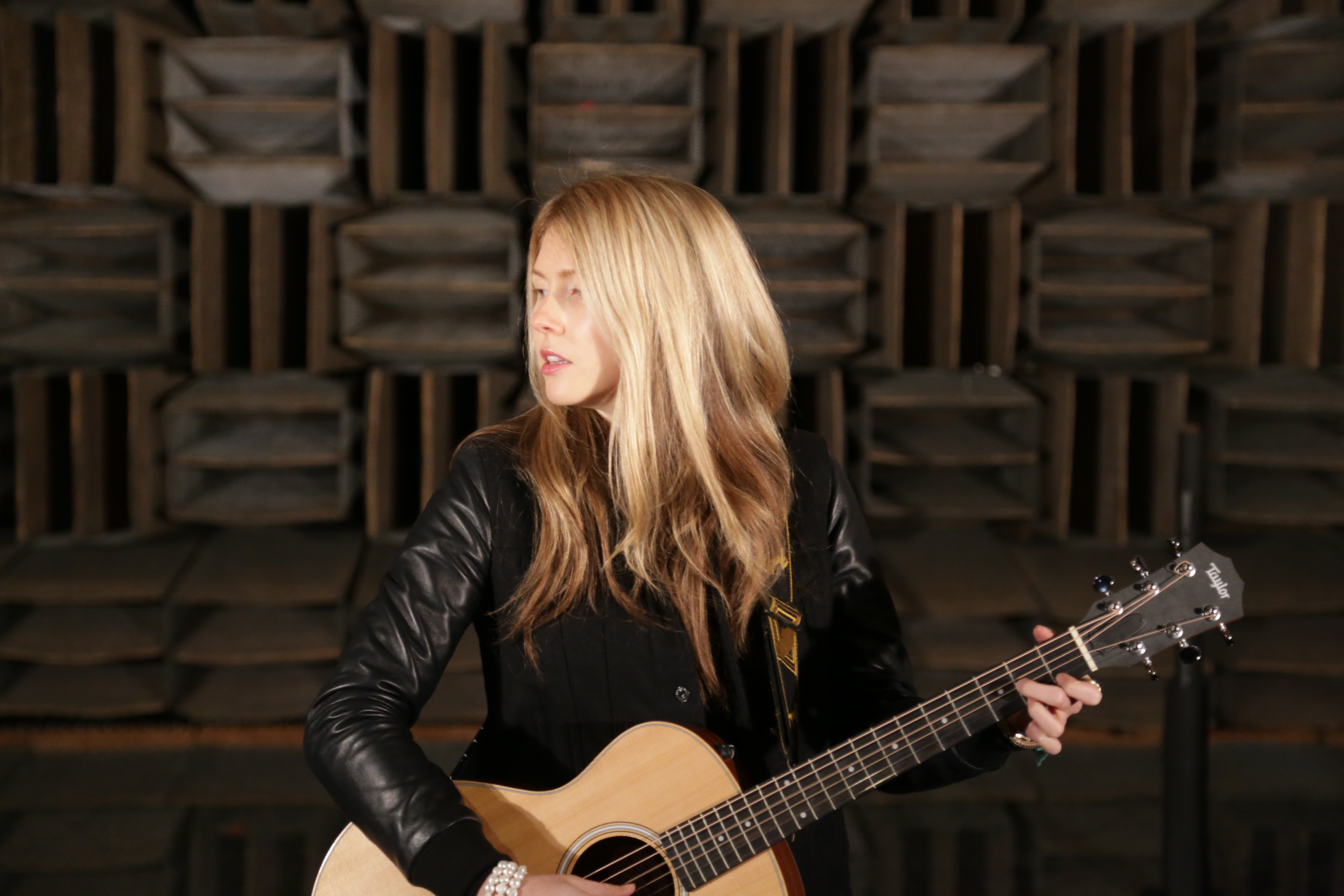
Wolfe in the anechoic chamber at Bell Labs

Responding to the streaming age of music becoming the principal way of listening and continuing her approach of trying to reunite music in the digital age with a sense of tangibility, ceremony and storytelling, Wolfe released Raw Space as the world's first 360° AR livestream in collaboration with Bell Labs and Design I/O. This was a first in the world for combining live, 360˚ stereoscopic video and real-time AR visuals, creating a modern, Fantasia-like live streamed album experience. In an interview with Hoboken Life, Wolfe described the thinking behind Raw Space:

Raw Space touches on the themes I've been exploring since my first album but in perhaps the most extreme and technicolor way. For this album, it began with a question. What would the anti-stream of today look like? With Raw Space, I wanted to create the antithesis of our current streaming experience and really celebrate the world of the album—it's artwork, arc, narrative, music—in a fully immersive and multi sensory way, which has the effect of placing the listener at the centre of this dynamic world.

The live stream started on 5 May 2017 and ran continuously for 7 days straight. A turntable physically played Wolfe's album Raw Space on repeat from inside the Bell Labs' anechoic chamber while people logged on via YouTube to listen to the music and explore the room in 360-degree video with the augmented reality animation bringing the album's artwork, lyrics and visual landscape to life in real-time for the viewers. The augmented reality animation was also part-generative, which meant that with every spin the visuals would evolve and listeners might experience different things. The Raw Space live stream was given high praise by TechCrunch, Axios (website), Fast Company, Wired and New Scientist, who described it as "like walking around in a dream someone had made for me" and the BBC Radio 4 called it "transformative" and "an extraordinary production: music and visuals" for "operating in this liminal space between online and offline".

=== Victoria and Albert Museum (solo exhibition) ===
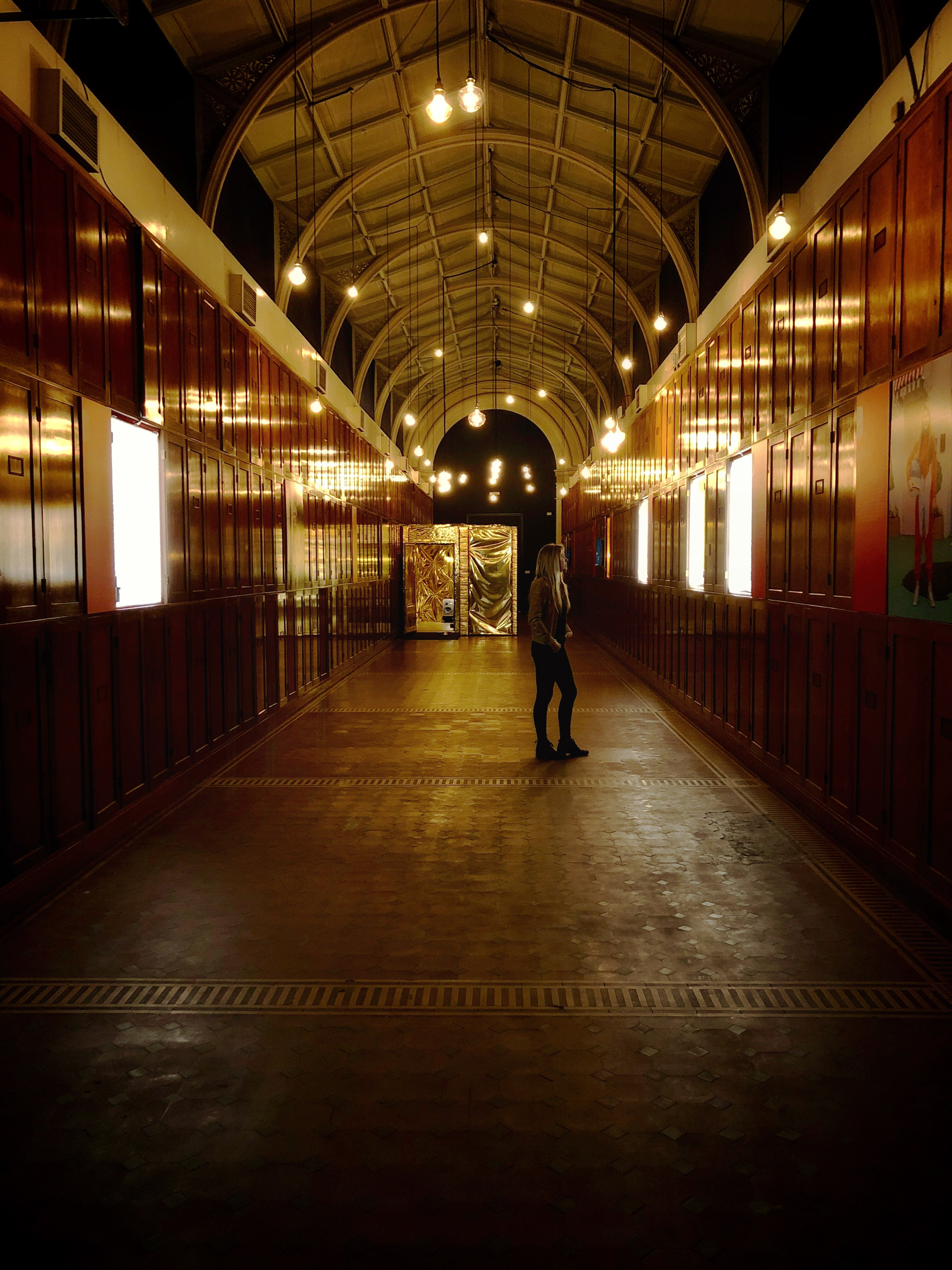
Beatie Wolfe exhibition in the Prince Consort Gallery, Victoria and Albert Museum, London

In 2018, the Victoria and Albert Museum invited Wolfe to hold a solo exhibition of her "world first designs for music in the digital age" in the Prince Consort Gallery. In addition to her existing album designs, Wolfe also created the Space Chamber, a Mylar-wrapped anechoic room within which visitors could experience the Raw Space live AR stream via a coin-operated viewport.

=== Barbican Centre documentary ===
In 2019, a documentary about Wolfe's work was commissioned by the Barbican Centre in London, where it premiered in October of that year. The film was directed by Los Angeles filmmaker Ross Harris.

=== Postcards for Democracy ===
In 2020, Devo frontman and film composer Mark Mothersbaugh and Beatie Wolfe created Postcards for Democracy, a collective postcard art demonstration that "calls for tangible public interest and action in saving United States Postal Service – an essential civic institution and fundamental element of the United States". The pair's aim was to encourage people to support the United States Postal Service and to remind people to vote ahead of the 2020 election. The campaign went viral, and the pair received tens of thousands of postcards, which were exhibited at the Rauschenberg Gallery in Florida in an exhibition that ran from May 17 to Aug 8, 2021. The Smithsonian Museum has archived part of this project in its permanent collection.

=== From Green to Red ===
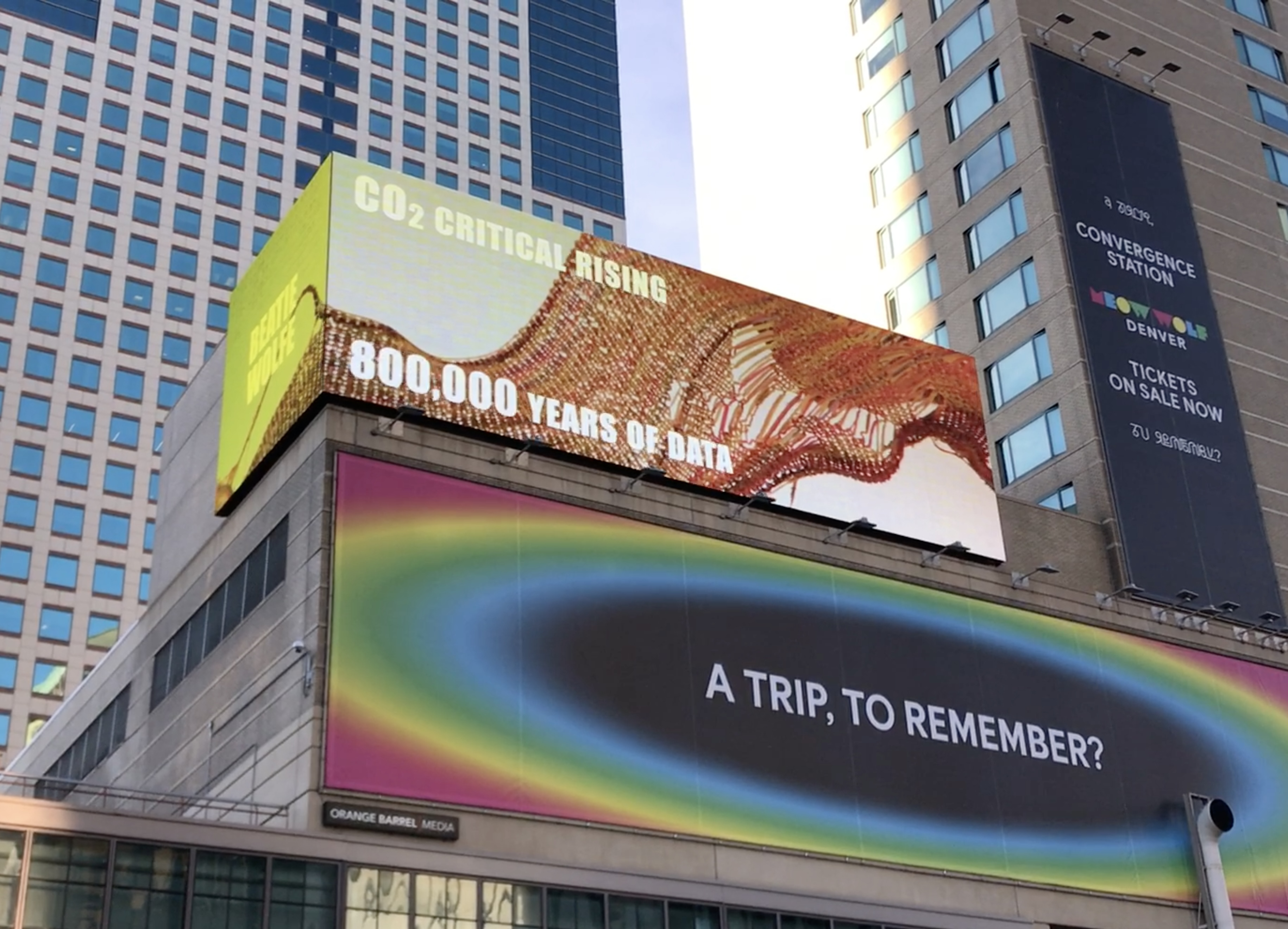
From Green to Red by Beatie Wolfe takes over downtown Denver screens

From Green to Red, described by the artist as an environmental protest piece, is a dynamic visualization of 800,000 years of atmospheric carbon dioxide data that Wolfe created in 2019 in response to the climate emergency. The woven data is set to Wolfe's song “From Green to Red”, which she wrote in 2006 after seeing the documentary An Inconvenient Truth. The project has been shown at the inaugural Nobel Prize Summit, where the artist spoke and performed after Al Gore and Sir David Attenborough in the summit's opening ceremony. From Green to Red has also been presented at The New York Times' Climate Hub at the United Nations COP26 along with a full-scale projection of the piece onto the conference center, which was covered live by Channel 4 News. It was also selected to be installed at the 2021 London Design Biennale curated by Es Devlin in its interactive version. The project won Silver at Webby's Anthem Awards and was selected as a finalist for Berlin's Falling Walls. It has also been shown at TED Women, the Museum of Science in Boston, SXSW, the Barbican Centre, and Virtual Design Festival.

== Music ==
=== Early music career ===
On 10–12 November 2007, Wolfe was invited to play the Jack Kerouac Festival at the Marquee Club alongside American performers Carolyn Cassady, Saul Williams and David Amram. David Amram, who declared Wolfe to be "the Baroness of bob", invited Wolfe to perform at his residency night at the Cornelia Street Cafe in New York. On 7 April 2008, Wolfe performed her first of several New York shows with Amram at Cornelia Street Cafe, alongside The Sopranos star John Ventimiglia. She also performed at New York clubs Rockwood Music Hall, The Living Room, Pete's Candy Store and on East Village Radio a residency with Punchdrunk's theatre show Sleep No More.

=== Burst (EP): 2010 ===
Wolfe's debut EP, Burst was released in January 2010 as an iPhone App as was one of very few artist apps available. GQ Magazine reviewed the launch concert at St Pancras Old Church as "the best concert [they'd] been to all year".

In July 2011, Wolfe performed at Secret Garden Party in Huntington. In August 2011, she was selected by EMI and Roundhouse to be featured in its 30/30 compilation album. This was released in December 2011 on Roundhouse Records. In August 2011, Wolfe shared the bill with American jazz musician Wynton Marsalis at Ronnie Scott's Jazz Club. Following the show, Wolfe and Marsalis became friends and he became an important musical influence and mentor.

=== 8ight (album): 2013 ===
In July 2013, Wolfe released her debut album 8ight as a vinyl, lyric book and 'world's first' 3D interactive album app which British GQ premiered in its magazine, online and via its app and described as "the sultry songstress enraptured us with her smoky, captivating melodies about love and loss". It was also positively reviewed by Monocle as "Beautiful, it's hitting me like lovely records do" and called "Raw, brooding and so diverse it features everything from spongy bass to ukuleles, the record is an irresistible collection of melodious three-minute pop nuggets."

=== Montagu Square (album): 2015 ===
Wolfe's second album Montagu Square was conceived and recorded at 34 Montagu Square – the former home of Jimi Hendrix, Ringo Starr, Paul McCartney, John Lennon, and Yoko Ono$\wedge$ and the album's single "Take Me Home" was recorded in the room where McCartney wrote "Eleanor Rigby", and Hendrix penned "The Wind Cries Mary".

Montagu Square received positive reviews with The Independent newspaper calling the album "absolutely gorgeous" and praising Wolfe for being a "pioneering songwriter", Forbes calling it "extraordinary", The Huffington Post highlighting its "strong percussive sound with a bluesy overtone" and praising its "refreshingly low fi and honest" sound and Monocle Magazine describing the album as "pure and simple; a short, sharp flip-it-over-and-listen-again LP of well-made, expertly played, beautifully sung chamber pop".

=== Raw Space (album): 2017 ===
Wolfe's third album Raw Space was conceived at Bell Labs' Anechoic chamber, cited in the Guinness World Records as the quietest room in the world. The album features "Little Moth", a song written in tribute to singer songwriter Elliott Smith and described by Spindle Magazine as "a tender homage with the intimate double vocals, distant mellotron and all round low-fi sound, very much in the spirit of Smith's style and production". Highsnobiety named Wolfe as one of '10 Ways Music Will Change in 2017.'

Raw Space was released in May 2017 and reviewed positively by BBC Radio 4 who called it "delicious", KCRW who called it "raw, gritty and honest", Jazziz who praised the song arrangements for having echoes of George Martin, New Scientist who described it as "intimate, like the sound of secrets whispered under bed covers", and Nathan Brackett who called it "amazing" and made it an Amazon Music album of the month.

=== Calm compositions ===
Wolfe was the first original content creator on the meditation app Calm and continues to create Sleep Stories and Sleep Music for the site.

=== Brian Eno collaborative albums ===
June 6, 2025 saw Brian Eno and Beatie Wolfe release two collaborative projects, Luminal and Lateral released on Verve Records which Pitchfork's Grayson Haver Currin called "two spellbinding collaborations" in GQ. On October 10, 2025, their third collaborative album, Liminal, was released. The authors have dubbed Luminal as "dream music", Lateral as "space music", and Liminal as "dark matter music". The trilogy's cover art features Eno's light painting etchings, chosen for their luminous, vibrant qualities.

== Musical style and influences ==
The multi-instrumentalist Wolfe's style has been described as "low fi and honest" indie rock with a "strong percussive sound and bluesy overtone" and as "expertly played, beautifully sung chamber pop". Praised by GQ Magazine for her "smoky captivating melodies that envelop the listener in tales of love and loss" Wolfe's music pulls from the brooding poeticism of Leonard Cohen, the intimacy of Elliott Smith and occasionally veers into Americana and grunge territory. Wolfe's live performance has been hailed as "absolutely breathtaking" by The New York Times Magazine and "a profound delivery of depth and soul" and Wolfe has been described as a "beguiling, excellent live performer."

== Power of Music & Dementia ==
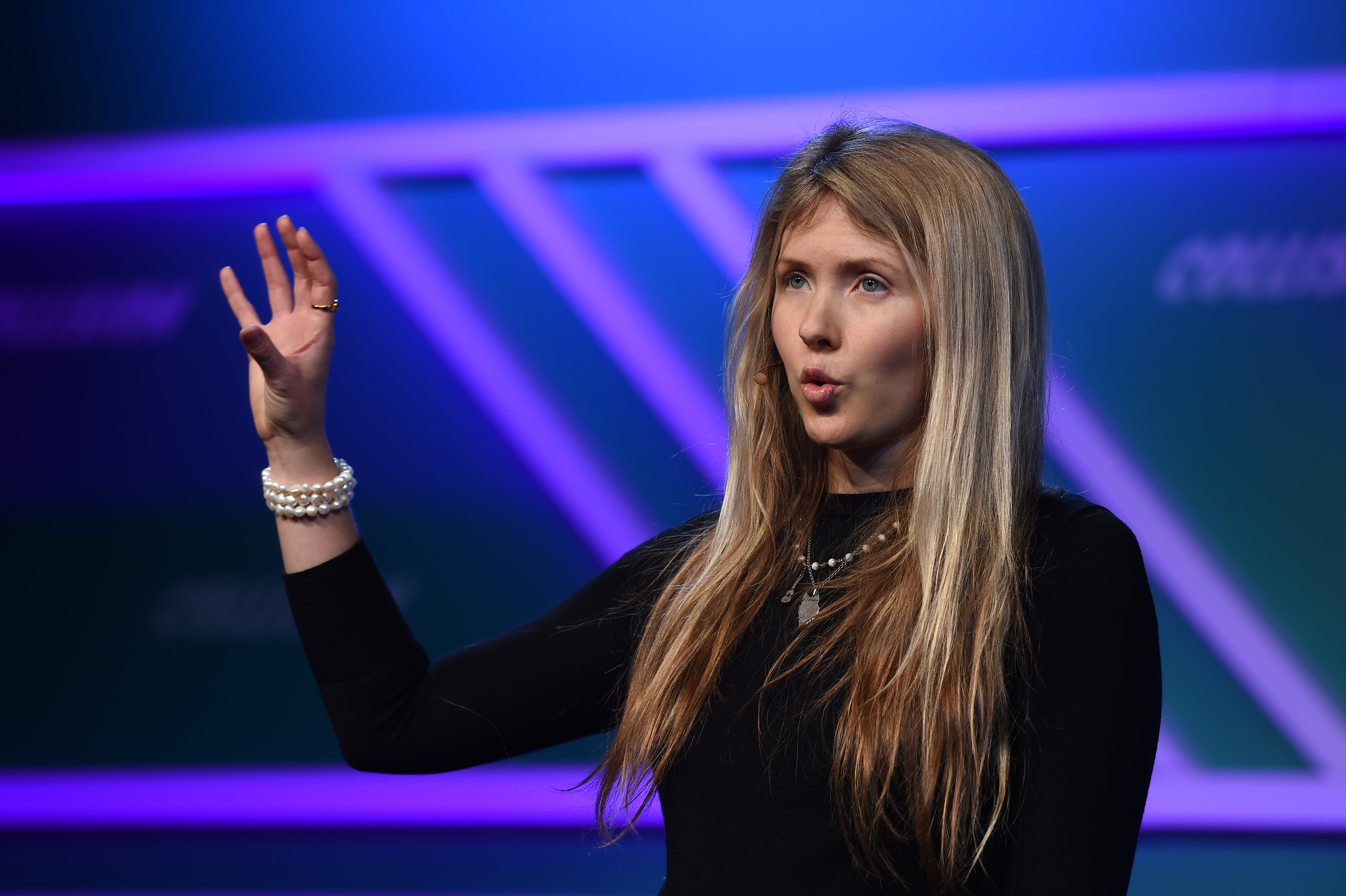
Wolfe speaking at Collision Conference 2018.

In 2014, Beatie Wolfe launched the philanthropic research project Power of Music & Dementia supported by The Utley Foundation. Wolfe was inspired by the work of the neurologist Oliver Sacks after family members became afflicted by the condition. The findings of the project which recorded the beneficial effects of using music for people with dementia and Alzheimer's disease included significant improvements in communication and memory, and received positive press from The Times, The Independent, The Guardian, BBC Radio 4, and Wired as the first study to both test and show the benefits of new (novel) music. The Power of Music & Dementia research project was the first known study to look at new music for people living with dementia and has been described as "ground-breaking" for testing music unconnected to memory. It has been endorsed by the Alzheimer's Association and Stanford University and recently turned into a charity Music For Dementia where she continues as an ambassador alongside Lauren Laverne. Wolfe gave a TEDMED talk about this project in March 2020.

== Awards and nominations ==
- Prix Ars Electronica winner of the 2024 Golden Nica.
- Chosen for Marie Claire's 2022 "Power List"
- Won Silver at Webby Awards's inaugural Anthem Award in recognition of From Green to Red.
- UN Women chose Wolfe as one of nine innovators to represent its global campaign as part of International Women's Day 2019
- Wired UK highlighted Wolfe as one of twenty-two changing the world in 2017
- Google Play Music nominated Wolfe for the 'Best Digital Artist' 2016 award alongside the 1975 and Alan Walker (music producer). Wolfe was the only independent artist nominated across the awards
- The Mayor of London appointed Wolfe as an Ambassador for London Technology. Wolfe was the only artist ambassador, joining UK CEO's of Microsoft, Google, Facebook, Martha Lane Fox and Eileen Burbidge.
- The Great Campaign selected Wolfe to represent the best of British creativity & innovation at the IFB2016 in Liverpool where Wolfe met Her Majesty Queen Elizabeth II
- Bell Labs chose Wolfe to reboot Experiments in Art and Technology program, which began with 9 Evenings: Theatre and Engineering in October 1966 and featured Andy Warhol, John Cage and Robert Rauschenberg as past collaborators
- The Women's International Music Network awarded Beatie Wolfe the She Rocks award for innovation alongside Gloria Gaynor, Suzi Quatro, Linda Perry and Tal Wilkenfeld
- Named on 2021 Alternative Power 100 Music list
- Wolfe was selected as a Falling Walls, Art and Science Finalist 2022

== Writing ==
=== Journalist ===
Beatie Wolfe writes a column for London's Evening Standard and is a contributor for The Nation, Dezeen, Design Milk and Birdy Magazine in addition to having curated The Los Angeles Times' inaugural NewStory festival.

=== Calm sleep stories ===
Beatie Wolfe was invited to join Stephen Fry as one of the first sleep story narrators on the meditation site Calm (company) with Wolfe writing, producing and narrating the first original content on the site. These stories became so popular Wolfe released each story's soundtrack.

=== Album lyric books ===
On 19 February 2014, at Mayfair's Maggs Bros Ltd on Berkeley Square – one of the longest-established antiquarian booksellers in the world – Wolfe launched the first edition of "Words of 8IGHT", her lyric book to accompany the album. For her second album Montagu Square, Wolfe released her lyric book with SecondHome Libreria.

== Discography ==
=== Albums ===
==== Raw Space ====
Released: 5 May 2017

Song	Track	Length	Written by
Little Moth	1	03:55	Beatie Wolfe
The Man Who	2	05:25	Beatie Wolfe
Pure Being	3	04:06	Beatie Wolfe
Gimme Some Love	4	04:26	Beatie Wolfe
Oh Darling	5	04:45	Beatie Wolfe
Broken Bird	6	05:03	Beatie Wolfe
As You	7	03:54	Beatie Wolfe
How Can I	8	04:24	Beatie Wolfe

==== Montagu Square ====
Released: 26 October 2015

Song	Track	Length	Written by
Set Her Free	1	02:56	Beatie Wolfe
Battleships	2	03:54	Beatie Wolfe
From Green To Red	3	04:27	Beatie Wolfe
Take Me Home	4	04:13	Beatie Wolfe
This Love	5	04:38	Beatie Wolfe
Simply Friends	6	03:20	Beatie Wolfe
To Be Saved	7	05:38	Beatie Wolfe
Need Somebody	8	04:29	Beatie Wolfe

==== 8ight ====
Released: 1 July 2013

Song	Track	Length	Written by
Lied	1	03:05	Beatie Wolfe
Make it Up	2	03:05	Beatie Wolfe
Never Ever	3	02:59	Beatie Wolfe
Too Lovely	4	03:28	Beatie Wolfe
Danger Blue	5	03:12	Beatie Wolfe
Thinking For Two	6	03:18	Beatie Wolfe
Could She Be	7	03:18	Beatie Wolfe
Beautiful Affair	8	03:52	Beatie Wolfe
Lied (Extd Ver)	Bonus	03:25	Beatie Wolfe

=== EPs ===
==== Burst EP ====
Released: 1 January 2010

Song	Track	Length	Written by
Beautiful Affair	1	03:40	Beatie Wolfe
Burst	2	04:54	Beatie Wolfe
11:07	3	04:11	Beatie Wolfe
It Will All Fall	4	04:08	Beatie Wolfe
As You	5	03:24	Beatie Wolfe

=== Apps ===
App	Developer	Released	Designer	Format
Beatie Wolfe – Burst EP	Theodore Watson	8 February 2010	Design I/0	iOS
Beatie Wolfe – 8	Theodore Watson	1 July 2013	Design I/0	iOS
