= Roger Eno =

English musician (born 1959)

- Born: Roger Paul Eugene Eno; 29 April 1959 (age 67); Woodbridge, Suffolk, England
- Occupations: Musician; composer
- Instrument: Piano
- Member of: Channel Light Vessel
- Website: rogereno.com

Roger Paul Eugene Eno (born 29 April 1959) is an English ambient music composer. He is the younger brother of Brian Eno.

== Early life and education ==
Roger Paul Eugene Eno began euphonium lessons when he was 12 years old, and entered Colchester Institute to study music when he was 16. Upon graduating, and after a period of busking in London (where he briefly shared a house with artists Mark Wallinger and Andy Dog), Eno returned to Colchester to run a music therapy course at a local hospital for people with learning difficulties.

In 2018, Eno received an Honorary Doctorate from the University of Essex (nominated by Colchester Institute) in recognition of his work as a composer, multi-instrumentalist and sound artist.

== Career ==
In 1983, he had his first recording experience when he recorded the album Apollo with his brother Brian Eno and Canadian producer and musician Daniel Lanois at Lanois' Grant Avenue Studios in Hamilton, Ontario. His first solo album, Voices, was released in 1985.

Although mainly regarded as a pianist, Eno is a multi-instrumentalist and singer, as demonstrated on his later solo albums and collaborations. He has worked with several key artists apart from his brother including Bill Nelson, No-Man, Lol Hammond, Mads Arp, Peter Hammill, Gaudi, Tim Bowness and Michael Brook, the most successful of which was probably his co-written album The Familiar, with Kate St John.

Eno performs live on occasions and writes soundtracks. Much of his music has been used in films, including For All Mankind, Nine and a Half Weeks, Warm Summer Rain and The Jacket, while tracks have been used in advertisements, including for Nissan and for Japan Railways.

Eno has recorded solo albums for, and established an online shop via, the UK-based internet label Burning Shed. In 2007, he contributed to the Mid/Air LP by Dive Index, a collaborative music project of composer/producer Will Thomas.

In 2013 Eno released the album, Endless City / Concrete Garden, under the name Roger Eno / Plumbline, and a collection of Eno's work from 1988 to 1998, Little Things Left Behind.

In 2015, Eno featured playing piano on two tracks ("A Boat Lies Waiting" and "Beauty") on David Gilmour's solo album, Rattle That Lock.

On 10 November 2017, Eno released a solo album, This Floating World, on Recital Records.

On 23 June 2019, he performed at the Dark Mofo in Hobart, Tasmania.

Roger performed for the first time with his brother Brian at the Acropolis on 4 August 2021.

== Discography ==
- Apollo (with Brian Eno & Daniel Lanois) (Virgin) – 1983
- Voices (EG/Virgin) – 1985
- Between Tides (All Saints Records) – 1988
- Music for Films III (Opal/Warner Bros. Records) – 1988
- Islands (with Laraaji) (Voiceprint Records, La Cooka Ratcha) – 1989
- In a Room (with Harmonia Ensemble) – 1993
- The Familiar (with Kate St John) (All Saints Records) – 1993
- Automatic (as part of Channel Light Vessel) (All Saints Records) – 1994
- Harmonia meets Zappa (with Harmonia Ensemble) (Materiali Sonori) – 1994
- Lost In Translation (All Saints Records) – 1995
- The Night Garden (Voiceprint Records, La Cooka Ratcha) – 1995
- Swimming (All Saints Records) – 1996
- Excellent Spirits (as part of Channel Light Vessel) (All Saints Records) – 1996
- The Music of Neglected English Composers (Voiceprint Records, Resurgence) – 1997
- The Flatlands (All Saints Records) – 1998
- Damage (with Lol Hammond) (All Saints Records) – 1999
- The Appointed Hour (with Peter Hammill) (FIE! Records) – 1999
- Classical Music for Those with No Memory (with Garosi, Puliti, Odori) – 2000
- The Long Walk (Voiceprint Records, La Cooka Ratcha) – 2000
- Getting Warmer (Burning Shed Records) – 2002
- 18 Keyboard Studies By Hans Friedrich Micheelsen (Opal Records) – 2002
- Fragile (Music) (Burning Shed Records) – 2005
- At Lincoln Cathedral: Roger Eno (Live) – 2005
- Transparencies (with Plumbline) – 2006
- Anatomy (Burning Shed Records) – 2008
- Flood (Burning Shed Records) – 2008
- Ted Sheldrake (Backwater Records) - 2012
- Endless City / Concrete Garden (with Plumbline) – 2013
- Rattle That Lock (David Gilmour) – Columbia/SME Records – 2015
- This Floating World (Recital Records) – 2017
- Dust of Stars (Painted World Music) – 2018
- Mixing Colours (with Brian Eno) – (Deutsche Grammophon/Universal Classics) – 2020
- The Turning Year – (Deutsche Grammophon/Universal Classics) – 2022
- The Skies, they shift like chords... – (Deutsche Grammophon/Universal Classics) – 2023
- Without Wind, Without Air - (Deutsche Grammophon) - 2025

== See also ==
- List of ambient music artists
