= Apollo: Atmospheres and Soundtracks =

Studio album by Brian Eno
- Released: 29 July 1983
- Recorded: 1981–1982
- Studios: Grant Avenue Studio, Hamilton, Ontario, Canada
- Genre: Ambient
- Length: 48:08
- Label: EG
- Producers: Brian Eno, Daniel Lanois

Brian Eno chronology
Ambient 4: On Land (1982)	Apollo: Atmospheres and Soundtracks (1983)	Music for Films Volume 2 (1983)

Apollo: Atmospheres and Soundtracks is a studio album by the English musician and producer Brian Eno, released on 29 July 1983 through EG Records. It was written and performed with the Canadian producer Daniel Lanois and Eno's brother, the composer Roger Eno. The music was written for a documentary film about the Apollo program, For All Mankind, which was not released until 1989.

Music from the album has appeared in the films 28 Days Later, Traffic, and Trainspotting, whose soundtrack sold approximately four million copies. "Deep Blue Day" was issued as a 7" single on EG Records.

Professional ratings
Aggregate scores
Source	Rating
Metacritic	89/100 (extended edition)
Review scores
Source	Rating
AllMusic	4.5/5 stars
Christgau's Record Guide	B
Mojo	5/5 stars
Pitchfork	9.1/10
Q	5/5 stars
Record Collector	4/5 stars
The Rolling Stone Album Guide	3/5 stars
Spin Alternative Record Guide	8/10
The Times	4/5 stars
Uncut	8/10 (2019); 10/10 (2025)

== Music ==
The music was composed in 1983 for a documentary film, For All Mankind, released in 1989. In the liner notes, Eno describes his experience of watching the Apollo 11 landing in 1969 and his sense that the strangeness of the event was compromised by the low quality of the television transmission and an excess of journalists' commentary. He thus wished to avoid the melodramatic and uptempo way the event was presented.

The album contains a variety of styles. "Under Stars", "The Secret Place", "Matta", "Signals", "Under Stars II", and "Stars" are all dark, complicated textures similar to those on Eno's previous album Ambient 4: On Land. "An Ending (Ascent)", "Drift", and "Always Returning" are smoother electronic pieces. "Silver Morning", "Deep Blue Day", and "Weightless" are country-inspired ambient pieces featuring Daniel Lanois on pedal steel guitar. Country music, which Eno listened to as a child in Woodbridge on American armed forces radio, was used to "give the impression of weightless space."

"Under Stars" is a recurring theme, first appearing as an ambient electronic bed behind a treated guitar. "Under Stars II" is the same composition, but with different effects and treatments. "Stars" is the pure background texture without the guitar.

The track "An Ending (Ascent)" was sampled in the song "Hear Me Out" by the group Frou Frou, in "Forgive" by British producer Burial, in "Ascent" by Michael Dow, a London electronic music producer, and in "The Ending" by British DJ Graham Gold. It has also been used in several films, such as Traffic and 28 Days Later, and in the memorial wall section of the London Olympiad opening.

Many of the tracks on the album were recorded with soft "attacks" of each note, then played backwards, with multiple heavy echoes and reverb added in both directions to merge the notes into one long flowing sound with each note greatly overlapping each adjacent note, producing the "floating" effects that Eno desired.

Lanois said the "foundation" of the song "Deep Blue Day" was a Suzuki Omnichord that was heavily slowed down from the original tempo that it was recorded at. In an interview with Gearspace, Lanois has also mentioned that a Yamaha CS-80 synthesiser, a Stratocaster guitar, and a Sho-Bud steel guitar were used. Eno once stated regarding the soundtrack: "...so many processings and reprocessings – it's a bit like making soup from the leftovers of the day before, which in turn was made from leftovers..." Eno said, ".... Well, I love that music anyway .... what I find impressive about that music is that it's very concerned with space in a funny way. Its sound is the sound of a mythical space, the mythical American frontier space that doesn't really exist anymore. That's why on Apollo I thought it very appropriate, because it's very much like 'space music' — it has all the connotations of pioneering, of the American myth of the brave individual...."

== Release ==
Apollo: Atmospheres and Soundtracks was released on 29 July 1983 by EG Records. A release in the US followed in September 1983. On 19 July 2019, in celebration of the 50th anniversary of the Apollo 11 Moon landing, a special remastered version was released, featuring an accompanying album of 11 new instrumental compositions by Brian Eno, Roger Eno & Lanois that reimagine the soundtrack to For All Mankind. "Deep Blue Day" was released as a single, with "Silver Morning" as the B-side, and appeared on the soundtrack to the 1996 film Trainspotting, which sold around four million copies.

== Live version ==
In 2009, a live version of the album was performed at two concerts in the IMAX cinema of London's Science Museum and in an arrangement by South Korean composer Woojun Lee for the ensemble Icebreaker with featured artist B J Cole on pedal steel guitar. The album was performed in its entirety, with the tracks in a different order, to a silent and edited version of For All Mankind, closer to the original conception than the released version of the film. A revised version was performed twice at the 2010 Brighton Festival, where Eno was guest artistic director, before subsequent touring in the UK, Ireland and mainland Europe.

Due to the heavily processed nature of the studio-based sound on the original tracks, an exact reproduction would have been impossible to reproduce in a live context, so Woojun Lee chose to apply a free interpretation of the sound world and to make an impression of the original tracks through use of Icebreaker's instrumental resources. The performances from Brighton were recorded and an album of the live interpretation was released in June 2012.

== Track listing ==
Apollo: Atmospheres and Soundtracks
No.	Title	Writer(s)	Length
1.	"Under Stars"	Brian Eno, Daniel Lanois	4:25
2.	"The Secret Place"	Daniel Lanois, arranged Brian Eno	3:27
3.	"Matta"	Brian Eno	4:14
4.	"Signals"	Brian Eno, Daniel Lanois	2:44
5.	"An Ending (Ascent)"	Brian Eno	4:18
6.	"Under Stars II"	Brian Eno, Daniel Lanois	3:15
7.	"Drift"	Roger Eno, Brian Eno	3:03
8.	"Silver Morning"	Daniel Lanois	2:35
9.	"Deep Blue Day"	Brian Eno, Daniel Lanois, Roger Eno	3:53
10.	"Weightless"	Brian Eno, Daniel Lanois, Roger Eno	4:28
11.	"Always Returning"	Brian Eno, Roger Eno	3:49
12.	"Stars"	Brian Eno, Daniel Lanois	7:57

For All Mankind (2019 remaster second disc)
No.	Title	Writer(s)	Length
1.	"The End of a Thin Cord"	Brian Eno	4:09
2.	"Capsule"	Brian Eno, Daniel Lanois	3:14
3.	"At the Foot of a Ladder"	Brian Eno, Roger Eno	3:36
4.	"Waking Up"	Brian Eno, Daniel Lanois	2:29
5.	"Clear Desert Night"	Brian Eno	3:11
6.	"Over the Canaries"	Brian Eno	4:42
7.	"Last Step from the Surface"	Brian Eno, Daniel Lanois	3:58
8.	"Fine-Grained"	Brian Eno, Daniel Lanois	3:37
9.	"Under the Moon"	Brian Eno, Roger Eno	3:10
10.	"Strange Quiet"	Brian Eno, Roger Eno	4:09
11.	"Like I Was a Spectator"	Brian Eno	4:23

== Personnel ==
- Musicians: Brian Eno, Daniel Lanois, Roger Eno
- Cover art by Russell Mills
- Mastered by Greg Calbi at Sterling Sound
- 2019 remaster by Miles Showell at Abbey Road

== Versions ==
Country	Release date	Music label	Media	Catalogue number	Notes
Netherlands	1983	Editions EG	LP	813 535-1	
US	1983	EG Records	LP	EGLP 53	
US	1983	Caroline	CD	0 1704-61514-2 9	
UK	1983	Virgin	CD	0777 7 86778 2 6	
UK	1986	EG Records	CD	EGCD 53	
UK	2005	Virgin	CD	7243 5 63647 2 1	
Europe	2005	Virgin	CD	ENOCD 10	Remastered
US	1983	Editions EG	11 x LP	EGBS 2	Working Backwards; 1983–1973 (Box set)

== Charts ==
Chart (1983)	Peak position
New Zealand Albums Chart	48
Chart (2019)	Peak position
Belgian Albums (Ultratop Flanders)	127
Belgian Albums (Ultratop Wallonia)	138
German Albums (Offizielle Top 100)	61
Scottish Albums (Official Charts)	8
UK Albums (Official Charts)	16
US Top Album Sales (Billboard)	48
US Top Dance Albums (Billboard)	16
US Indie Store Album Sales (Billboard)	9

== Certifications ==
Region	Certification	Certified units/sales
United Kingdom (BPI)	Silver	60,000^{‡}
^{‡} Sales+streaming figures based on certification alone.

== Uses in other media ==
- "An Ending (Ascent)":
  - Concert – Coldplay Live at the Royal Albert Hall (2014), intro music
  - Concert – Slowdive Souvlaki tour (1993-94), intro music
  - TV – London 2012 opening ceremony, during a sequence where a collection of photographs of lost loved ones of stadium guests and terrorism victims was shown
  - TV – James May on the Moon, opening sequence
  - TV – Chris Morris's surreal TV comedy series Jam
  - TV – American drama Nip/Tuck, in numerous episodes
  - TV – Top Gear (Series 13 Episode 7), during the final sequence of the series and closing credits as Jeremy Clarkson drives the Aston Martin Vantage V12
  - TV advertisement – for Cancer Research UK
  - TV advertisement – for BMW
  - TV – BBC 9/11 10th anniversary
  - TV – BBC Doctor Who Night 1999 ('How To Live Forever' segment)
  - Film soundtrack – Traffic (2000)
  - Film soundtrack – Ghosts of Cité Soleil (2006)
  - Film soundtrack – 28 Days Later (2002)
  - Film soundtrack – Clean (2004)
  - Film soundtrack – Beatriz at Dinner (2017)
  - Film soundtrack - Maria (2024)
  - Museum exhibit – The National WWII Museum, New Orleans, LA
- "Deep Blue Day":
  - Film soundtrack – Trainspotting
  - TV – Chris Morris's surreal TV comedy series Jam
- "Always Returning":
  - Film soundtrack – Me and Earl and the Dying Girl.
  - Film soundtrack – Love.
- "Weightless":
  - Film soundtrack – Static.
- "The Secret Place":
  - Film soundtrack – The Lovely Bones.
