= Music for Films III =

Studio album by various artists
- Released: 1988 / 2005
- Genre: Ambient
- Length: 51:28
- Label: Opal Records/All Saints Records
- Producer: Various

Brian Eno chronology
Hybrid (1985)	Music for Films III (1988)	Textures (1989)

Professional ratings
Review scores
Source	Rating
AllMusic	3/5 stars

Music for Films III is the third entry in Brian Eno's "Music for Films" series. It was the first in the series to include music from artists other than Brian Eno, including Roger Eno, Michael Brook, Laraaji, and Harold Budd, among others, with Brian Eno involved with the production of all tracks.

Several different versions of this album exist. The record and cassette release featured 15 tracks, while the original CD release contained the same tracks in a different playing order. In 2005, an updated CD, featuring two extra tracks, new artwork, a different playing order and sequencing by the group Marconi Union was released.

Various tracks from Music for Films III were incorporated into the soundtrack for Al Reinert's 1989 documentary For All Mankind.

== Reception ==
Spin wrote the album, "proffers sustained atmospheres and creeping unease, far from the cut and dash of modern pop".

== Track listing ==
=== Record/cassette ===
Side 1

1. Brian Eno - "Saint Tom" (3:35)
2. Brian Eno/Daniel Lanois - "White Mustang" (3:01)
3. Brian Eno/Daniel Lanois - "Sirens" (3:06)
4. Brian Eno - "Asian River" (4:20)
5. Laraaji - "Zaragoza" (3:05)
6. Roger Eno - "Quixote" (3:30)
7. Roger Eno - "Fleeting Smile" (2:30)
8. Brian Eno/Roger Eno - Theme for 'Opera'" (2:36)
9. Laraaji - "Kalimba" (2:47)

Side 2

1. Daniel Lanois - "Tension Block" (3:09)
2. Michael Brook - "Err" (4:02)
3. John Paul Jones - "4-Minute Warning" (3:53)
4. Lydia Theremin/Misha Malin - "For Her Atoms" (3:33)
5. Harold Budd - "Balthus Bemused by Color" (5:17)
6. Brian Eno - Theme from 'Creation'" (3:04)

The original Opal Records LP did not include ""Asian River" or "Theme for 'Opera'", although the cassette did. In this album, Lydia Kavina was credited as "Lydia Theremin".

=== CD ===
1. Daniel Lanois - "Tension Block" (3:09)
2. Michael Brook - "Err" (4:02)
3. John Paul Jones - "4-Minute Warning" (3:53)
4. Lydia Theremin/Misha Malin - "For Her Atoms" (3:33)
5. Harold Budd - "Balthus Bemused by Color" (5:17)
6. Brian Eno - "Theme from 'Creation'" (3:04)
7. Brian Eno - "Saint Tom" (3:35)
8. Brian Eno/Daniel Lanois - "White Mustang" (3:01)
9. Brian Eno/Daniel Lanois - "Sirens" (3:06)
10. Brian Eno - "Asian River" (4:20)
11. Laraaji - "Zaragoza" (3:05)
12. Roger Eno - "Quixote" (3:30)
13. Roger Eno - "Fleeting Smile" (2:30)
14. Brian Eno/Roger Eno - "Theme for 'Opera'" (2:36)
15. Laraaji - "Kalimba" (2:47)

The 2005 re-issue of the CD features two new tracks: "Slower and Slower" by Roger Eno and "Shark 12" by Brian Eno on the American release, "Shark 15" by Brian Eno in the UK.
