= Onmyoji (disambiguation) =

An onmyōji is a practitioner of onmyōdō.

Onmyōji may also refer to:

== Film ==
- Onmyoji (film), a 2001 Japanese film based on the short story and novel series Onmyōji
  - Onmyoji II, a 2003 Japanese film and the sequel to the 2001 film
- The Yin-Yang Master: Dream of Eternity, a 2020 Chinese film based on the short story and novel series Onmyōji
- The Yinyang Master, a 2021 Chinese film based on the video game Onmyoji

== Other uses ==
- Onmyōji (literary series), a short story and novel series by Baku Yumemakura
- Music for Onmyo-Ji, a 2000 soundtrack album by Reigakusya, Brian Eno, and J. Peter Schwalm for the manga series Onmyōji

== See also ==
- Shōnen Onmyōji, a light novel series by Mitsuru Yuki
- Twin Star Exorcists (Sōsei no Onmyōji), a manga series by Yoshiaki Sukeno
- Nue's Exorcist (Nue no Onmyōji), a manga series by Kōta Kawae
