= Minamoto no Hiromasa =

Japanese noble and musician (918–980)

Minamoto no Hiromasa 源 博雅
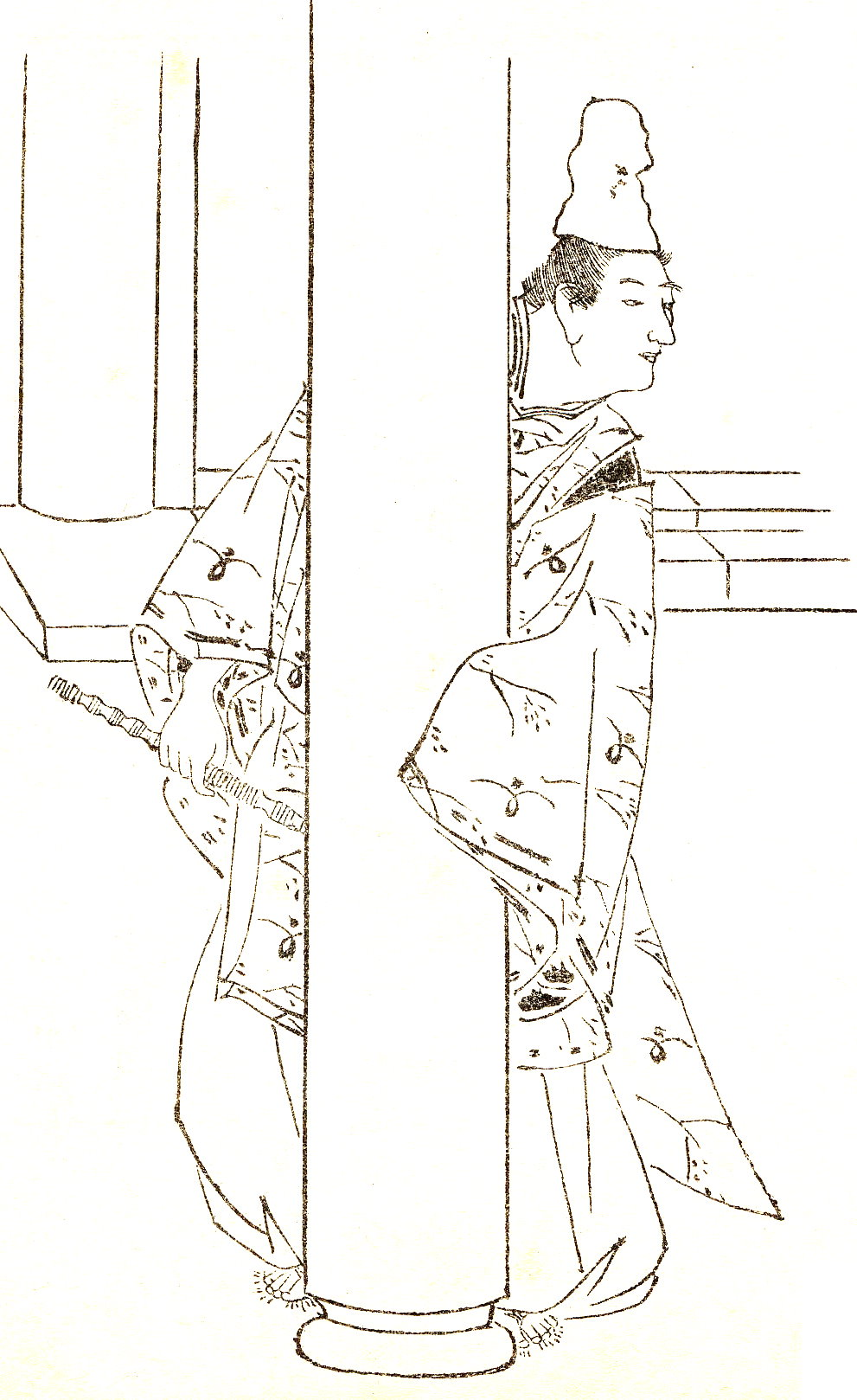

Background information
- Born: 918 Japan
- Died: 980 (aged 61–62) Japan
- Musical career
- Genres: Gagaku

Minamoto no Hiromasa (源 博雅; 918 – September 28, 980) was a nobleman and gagaku musician in the Heian period. He was the eldest son of Prince Katsuakira and the grandson of Emperor Daigo. His mother was the daughter of Fujiwara no Tokihira.

== Career ==
Because the highest rank he achieved was Provisional Master of the Palace of the Empress as a lower third-rank non-councillor, he was known as Hakuga no Sanmi (博雅三位), which is the Chinese reading of the characters for 'Hiromasa' and those for 'third rank'.

He was an expert in kangen (管弦), an orchestral gagaku which does not accompany dance. He was also called Choushuukyou (長秋卿) or Lord Autumn after the Autumn Palace, the poetic name for the empress and her dwelling.

When he was removed from the imperial succession, he was granted the surname Minamoto. In 934, the lower fourth rank was conferred upon him. In 947, he became the Senior Assistant Minister of the Ministry of Central Affairs. In 959, he became Captain of the Right Watch. In 965, he became the Middle Captain of the Left Palace Guards. In 974, he was promoted to the lower third rank and became Provisional Master of the Palace of the Queen Mother.

He attained his mastery of gagaku, as music lore has it, by studying vocal music with Prince Atsumi, koto with Emperor Daigo, biwa with Minamoto no Osamu, flute with Ooishi no Minekichi, and hichiriki from Yoshimine no Yukimusa. Bass hichiriki was his strong point, but he disliked song and dance. In 951, he played biwa at the Emperor's New Year's banquet.

In 966, by the order of Emperor Murakami, he compiled an imperial music anthology, the Shinsen gakubu (新撰楽譜; also called Hakuga no Fue-fu meaning "Hiromasa's Flute Score"). The system of notation he developed is still used today.

There is a story that he was called upon to participate in the so-called "Forth Year of Tentoku Poetry Contest" in 960, but that he froze in front of the emperor and accidentally gave the title of one poem while he recited another.

He received the famous flute Ha Futatsu (葉二) from the demon at the Suzakumon Gate. He retrieved the famous biwa Genjou (玄象) from the Rashomon Gate. After three years of visiting Semimaru in Osaka, he was taught the secret tunes "Flowing Spring" and "Woodpecker". He appears in many tales of this kind in sources like the Konjaku Monogatarishu. Also, it is said that he held his liquor well and was a heavy drinker.

About his personality, Fujiwara no Sanesuke made the following comment in his diary the shoyuki: "As for Hiromasa, he's a poet and a writer, but he neglects his duties."

== In fiction ==
- In the novel "Onmyoji" (novel: Baku Yumemakura, manga: Reiko Okano), Hiromasa appears as the partner of the protagonist, Abe no Seimei. He was portrayed as a young court official (and partner of Abe no Seimei) by actor Hideaki Itō, in director Yōjirō Takita's movies "Onmyoji" and "Onmyoji 2".

=== Film ===
- Portrayed by Deng Lun in the 2020 film The Yin-Yang Master: Dream of Eternity.
- Portrayed by Qu Chuxiao in the 2020 film The Yinyang Master.
