= Yuan yin =

Yuan Yin, Yuan-yin, Yuanyin may refer to:

== People ==
=== Given name Yuanyin, Yuan-yin ===
- Xiao Mohe (Chinese: 蕭摩訶; 532–604), Chinese general during the Chen and Sui dynasties; courtesy name Yuanyin (元胤)
- Jing Yuan Yin, competitor for Singapore in table tennis at the 2014 Summer Youth Olympics
- Lim Yuan Yin, competitor for Singapore at the 2015 Asian Canoe Sprint Championships

=== Given name Yin, Surname Yuan ===
- Yuan Yin (Han dynasty) [ zh ] (Chinese: 袁胤), Han Dynasty minister of China, cousin of Yuan Shu and Yuan Shao
- Yuan Yin, Chinese actress and wife of Chinese actor Hou Yaowen

== Places ==
- Yuanyin Farm, Guanyin District, Taoyuan City, Taiwan

== Other uses ==
- Yuan yin, the left kidney in Yuanqi under Traditional Chinese Medicine

== See also ==
- Yuan (disambiguation)
- Yin (disambiguation)
- Yin Yuan (disambiguation)
- Yin and Yang (disambiguation)
