= The Long Now =

The Long Now may refer to:

- Long Now Foundation, a society founded by Stewart Brand and Brian Eno for the promotion of long-term thinking
- Clock of the Long Now, a proposed clock designed to keep time for 10,000 years, being designed as a project of the Long Now Foundation
- The Long Now (album), a 2008 album by the Australian indie rock band Children Collide
- January 07003: Bell Studies for the Clock of the Long Now, a 2003 album by Brian Eno
- "Long Now", a 2013 single by Owen Tromans inspired by the Long Now Foundation
