= Yin Yuan =

Yin Yuan, Yin-yuan, Yinyuan may refer to:

== People and characters ==
=== Given name Yinyuan, Yin-yuan ===
- Li Yinyuan (Chinese: 李荫远; 1919–2016), Chinese academic
- Prince Yinyuan (Chinese: 胤禐; born 1718), son of Qing Dynasty Kangxi Emperor
- Carmen Chow Yin-yuan (周燕媛), a fictional character from Hong Kong TV show Between Love & Desire

=== Given name Yin, Surname Yuan ===
- Yuan Yin (Han dynasty) [ zh ] (Chinese: 袁胤), Han Dynasty minister of China
- Yuan Yin, Chinese actress and wife of Chinese actor Hou Yaowen

=== Surname Yuanyin ===
- Yinyuan Longqi (Chinese: 隱元隆琦; 1592–1673), Chinese monk in Japan, known as Ingen

== Places ==
- Yinyuan (simplified Chinese: 因远镇; traditional Chinese: 因遠鎮; pinyin: Yīnyuǎn-zhèn), Yunnan, China

== Other uses ==
- Yin Yuan Stone, Mount Danxia, Renhua, Guangdong, China; a natural feature

== See also ==
- Yuan (disambiguation)
- Yin (disambiguation)
- Yuan yin (disambiguation)
- Yin and Yang (disambiguation)
