= Fancy Dance =

Fancy dance is one name for a type of dance loosely based on the war dance.

Fancy Dance may also refer to:

- Fancy Dance (1969), from Joe Sample's discography
- Fancy Dance (manga), a 1984 – 1990 Japanese shōjo manga series
  - its 1989 live action film adaptation, directed by Masayuki Suo
- Fancy Dance (film), an American drama film directed by Erica Tremblay
