= Onmyoji II =

- DVD cover
- Directed by: Yōjirō Takita
- Screenplay by: Yasushi Fukuda; Baku Yumemakura; Itaru Era
- Based on: Onmyōji by Baku Yumemakura
- Produced by: Kazuya Hamana; Tetsuji Hayashi; Nobuyuki Tōya
- Starring: Mansai Nomura; Hideaki Itō; Kiichi Nakai; Kyoko Fukada; Hayato Ichihara
- Narrated by: Masane Tsukayama
- Cinematography: Takeshi Hamada
- Edited by: Nobuko Tomita
- Music by: Shigeru Umebayashi
- Production companies: Tohokushinsha Film Corporation; Tokyo Broadcasting System; Dentsu; Kadokawa Shoten Publishing Co. Toho
- Distributed by: Toho
- Release date: October 4, 2003 (Japan)
- Running time: 115 minutes
- Country: Japan
- Language: Japanese
- Box office: ¥1.6 billion

Onmyoji II (Japanese: 陰陽師II, Hepburn: Onmyōji Tsū), also known as The Yin-Yang Master II, is a 2003 Japanese historical fantasy film directed by Yōjirō Takita, starring Mansai Nomura as the onmyōji Abe no Seimei. Both it and its predecessor, Onmyōji, are based on the Onmyōji series of short stories and novels by Baku Yumemakura.

The film was released on DVD and VCD in the Philippines in early 2005 as The Yin Yang Master 2. and in Northern America by Geneon as Onmyoji II.

== Cast ==
- Mansai Nomura as Abe no Seimei
- Hideaki Itō as Minamoto no Hiromasa
- Eriko Imai as Mitsumushi
- Kyōko Fukada as Himiko
- Kiichi Nakai as Genkaku
- Hayato Ichihara as Susa

== See also ==
- Onmyoji (disambiguation)
