= Drawn from Life =

Studio album by Brian Eno and J. Peter Schwalm
- Released: 15 May 2001
- Recorded: 2001
- Genres: Ambient, experimental, downtempo
- Length: 68:12
- Label: Opal

Brian Eno chronology
Music for Onmyo-Ji (2000)	Drawn from Life (2001)	January 07003: Bell Studies for the Clock of the Long Now (2003)

Professional ratings
Aggregate scores
Source	Rating
Metacritic	77/100
Review scores
Source	Rating
AllMusic	3/5 stars
Entertainment Weekly	B
The Guardian	3/5 stars
Pitchfork	5.4/10
Q	3/5 stars
Rolling Stone	4.5/5 stars
Uncut	3/5 stars

"Drawn from Life" is also the name of a series of short animated films by Paul Fierlinger

Drawn from Life is a 2001 music album by the British ambient musician Brian Eno and the German composer J. Peter Schwalm.

== Track listing (original UK vinyl pressing) ==
All tracks composed by Eno and Schwalm, except where stated.

1. "From This Moment" – 1:21
2. "Persis" – 7:41
3. "More Dust" – 6:01
4. "Night Traffic" – 8:19
5. "Two Voices" – 3:59
6. "Rising Dust" – 7:44
7. "Intenser" – 5:23
8. "Like Pictures Part #1" – 1:20 (Eno, Schwalm & Holger Czukay)
9. "Like Pictures Part #2" – 5:48 (Eno, Schwalm & Laurie Anderson)
10. "Bloom" – 7:10

== Track listing (subsequent releases) ==
1. "From This Moment" – 1:21
2. "Persis" – 7:41
3. "Like Pictures Part #1" – 1:20
4. "Like Pictures Part #2" – 5:48
5. "Night Traffic" – 8:19
6. "Rising Dust" – 7:44
7. "Intenser" – 5:23
8. "More Dust" – 6:01
9. "Bloom" – 7:10
10. "Two Voices" – 3:59
11. "Bloom" (Instrumental Version) – 7:07

== Personnel ==
- Brian Eno, composing, performing, cover art
- J. Peter Schwalm, composing, performing, mixing, premastering

With:

- Leo Abrahams, guitar on "Rising Dust", "Intenser"
- Laurie Anderson, voice on "Like Pictures Part #2"
- Nell Catchpole, strings on "Persis", "Like Pictures Part #2", "Rising Dust", "Intenser", "Bloom"
- Holger Czukay, IBM Dictaphone on "Like Pictures Part #1"
- Darla Eno and Irial Eno, voices on "Bloom"
- Heiko Himmighoffen, percussion on "Night Traffic", "Rising Dust", "Intenser"
- Lynn Gerlach, voice on "Rising Dust"
- Michy Nakao, voice on "Like Pictures Part #1"
