= Yin yang (disambiguation) =

Yin and yang are concepts in Chinese philosophy, used to describe how opposite or contrary forces are actually complementary.

The yin yang symbol is a Chinese symbol known as a taijitu which demonstrates the concept.

The concept is associated with the philosophy known as Taoism.

Yin and yang, yin yang or yin-yang may also refer to:

== Music ==
- Yin-Yang (group), Russian-Ukrainian pop group
- Ying Yang Twins, Atlanta-based American hip hop duo
- Yin and Yang (albums), two separate compilation albums by Fish co-released in 1995
- Yin & Yang (album), an album by Nikolija
- Yin-Yang (album), third album released by Victor Wooten
- The Yin and the Yang, 2001 album of Wu-Tang Clan member Cappadonna
- Lil' Mo' Yin Yang, collaborative house-music act of producers and DJs Erick Morillo and Little Louie Vega

== Others ==
- Yin Yang fish, also called dead-and-alive fish, dish in Taiwanese cuisine
- Yin Yang Yo!, American-Canadian animated television series created by Bob Boyle II
- Yin-Yang, fictional character, eleventh King of Xanth, able to create invokable spells in Magicians of Xanth from the Xanth series
- YY1 or Yin Yang 1, a transcriptional repressor protein in humans that is encoded by the YY1 gene
- The Yin and the Yang of Mr. Go, 1970 British film directed by Burgess Meredit

== See also ==
- Yang Yin (511–560), courtesy name Zhunyan nicknamed Qinwang, a high-level official of the Chinese dynasty Northern Qi
- Zhao Yang (noble) (died 475bc), personal name Ying Yang, a fifth century b.c. head noble of the Jin state
- Triple yin yang (disambiguation)
- Onmyoji (disambiguation) (which uses Yin-Yang or Yinyang)
