= Onmyōji (literary series) =

Japanese short story and novel series by Baku Yumemakura

- Cover of the first collection of the Onmyōji short stories, published by Bungeishunju on August 10, 1988

陰陽師
- Genre: Historical fantasy
- Novel series
- Written by: Baku Yumemakura
- Published by: Bungeishunju
- Original run: September 1986 – present
- Manga
- Written by: Reiko Okano
- Published by: Schola, Hakusensha
- Magazine: Comic Burger (1993–1996); Comic Birz (1996–1999); Melody (1999–2005)
- Original run: 1993 – 2005
- Volumes: 13
- Manga

Onmyōji: Tamatebako
- Written by: Reiko Okano
- Published by: Hakusensha
- Magazine: Melody
- Original run: December 28, 2010 – April 28, 2017
- Volumes: 7
- Manga

Onmyōji: Taki Yasha Hime
- Written by: Munku Mitsuki
- Published by: Tokuma Shoten
- Magazine: Monthly Comic Ryū
- Original run: March 19, 2012 – December 20, 2015
- Volumes: 8
- Original net animation
- Directed by: Soubi Yamamoto
- Produced by: Keiichi Matsuda
- Written by: Soubi Yamamoto
- Music by: Kensuke Ushio
- Studio: Marvy Jack
- Licensed by: Netflix
- Released: November 28, 2023
- Runtime: 25–27 minutes
- Episodes: 13
- Films
- Onmyoji; Onmyoji II; The Yin-Yang Master: Dream of Eternity; The Yin Yang Master

Onmyōji (陰陽師) is a series of historical fantasy short stories and novels written by Japanese author Baku Yumemakura. It follows the story of a fictionalized version of the Heian period onmyōji Abe no Seimei, a master in onmyōdō, a traditional Japanese form of cosmology.

Most of the series was originally published as individual short stories, the first of which, originally titled just "Onmyōji", first appeared in the September 1986 issue of the publisher Bungeishunju's magazine All Yomimono, and they have since appeared across a wide variety of publications, before being republished in collections. In addition to the short stories, the series also includes novels and picture books.

A manga adaptation by Reiko Okano was serialized from 1993 to 2005; it won two major prizes (the Tezuka Osamu Cultural Prize and the Seiun Award), and begot a sequel, Onmyōji: Tamatebako, serialized from 2010 to 2017. Another manga series, Onmyōji: Taki Yashahime, by Munku Mitsuki, was serialized from 2012 to 2015.

The original stories and novels have also inspired several live-action adaptions: a Japanese television drama series was broadcast on NHK G in 2001; two films directed by Yōjirō Takita were released; Onmyoji in 2001 and Onmyoji II in 2003; two TV movies were broadcast on TV Asahi in 2015 and 2020; a Chinese live-action film directed by Guo Jingming was released in 2020. An original net animation (ONA) series adaptation by Marvy Jack premiered in November 2023 on Netflix.

A Chinese video game loosely based on the series was released by NetEase in 2018, and this in turn inspired another Chinese live-action film, directed by Li Weiran, released in 2021. It also been adapted for the stage several times.

== Characters ==
Imperial Prince Atsumi
Voiced by: Kenji Hamada (Japanese); Armen Taylor (English)
Tsuyuko
Voiced by: Yui Ishikawa (Japanese); Kira Buckland (English)
Abe no Seimei
Voiced by: Daisuke Namikawa (Japanese); Howard Wang (English)
Minamoto no Hiromasa
Voiced by: Shintarō Asanuma (Japanese); Greg Chun (English)
Ashiya Dōman
Voiced by: Rina Satō (Japanese); Rebeka Thomas (English)
Kamo Yasunori
Voiced by: Daisuke Kishio (Japanese); Todd Haberkorn (English)

== Publication ==
Written by Baku Yumemakura, the original "Onmyōji" short story first appeared in the Bungeishunju's All Yomimono in the September 1986 issue. Since then, additional short stories have been published across a wide variety of different publications, then later compiled and republished in both tankōbon and bunkoban format, with the first collection published by Bungeishunju on August 10, 1988, and on February 9, 1991, in these formats respectively.

Yumemakura also wrote novel-length stories; the first one was published in tankōbon by The Asahi Shimbun Company in 2000 and republished in bunkoban by Bungeishunju in 2003. A two-part novel was published in tankōbon in 2005 and in bunkoban in 2008 by Bungeishunju. Three picture books with illustrations by Yutaka Murakami have also been published by Bungeishunju in 2001, 2003, and 2005.

=== Short story collections ===
No.	Title	Release date	ISBN
1	Onmyōji (陰陽師)	August 10, 1988 (tankōbon); February 9, 1991 (bunkoban)	978-4-16-310450-8 (tankōbon); 978-4-16-752801-0 (bunkoban)
2	Onmyōji: Hiten no Maki (陰陽師 飛天ノ巻)	June 20, 1995 (tankōbon); November 10, 1998 (bunkoban)	978-4-16-315650-7 (tankōbon); 978-4-16-752804-1 (bunkoban)
3	Onmyōji: Tsukumogami no Maki (陰陽師 付喪神ノ巻)	November 30, 1997 (tankōbon); November 10, 2000 (bunkoban)	978-4-16-317360-3 (tankōbon); 978-4-16-752805-8 (bunkoban)
4	Onmyōji: Hōō no Maki (陰陽師 鳳凰ノ巻)	June 26, 2000 (tankōbon); October 10, 2002 (bunkoban)	978-4-16-319320-5 (tankōbon); 978-4-16-752807-2 (bunkoban)
5	Onmyōji: Ryūteki no Maki (陰陽師 龍笛ノ巻)	January 15, 2002 (tankōbon); March 10, 2005 (bunkoban)	978-4-16-320610-3 (tankōbon); 978-4-16-752813-3 (bunkoban)
6	Onmyōji: Taikyoku no Maki (陰陽師 太極ノ巻)	April 14, 2004 (tankōbon); March 10, 2006 (bunkoban)	978-4-16-321730-7 (tankōbon); 978-4-16-752815-7 (bunkoban)
7	Onmyōji: Yakōhai no Maki (陰陽師 夜光杯ノ巻)	June 29, 2007 (tankōbon); December 14, 2009 (bunkoban)	978-4-16-326060-0 (tankōbon); 978-4-16-752820-1 (bunkoban)
8	Onmyōji: Tenko no Maki (陰陽師 天鼓ノ巻)	January 29, 2010 (tankōbon); July 10, 2012 (bunkoban)	978-4-16-328860-4 (tankōbon); 978-4-16-752824-9 (bunkoban)
9	Onmyōji: Daigo no Maki (陰陽師 醍醐ノ巻)	March 30, 2011 (tankōbon); November 8, 2013 (bunkoban)	978-4-16-380570-2 (tankōbon); 978-4-16-752825-6 (bunkoban)
10	Onmyōji: Suigetsu no Maki (陰陽師 酔月ノ巻)	October 30, 2012 (tankōbon); January 5, 2015 (bunkoban)	978-4-16-381720-0 (tankōbon); 978-4-16-790270-4 (bunkoban)
11	Onmyōji: Sōkō no Maki (陰陽師 蒼猴ノ巻)	January 10, 2014 (tankōbon); June 10, 2016 (bunkoban)	978-4-16-390000-1 (tankōbon); 978-4-16-790627-6 (bunkoban)
12	Onmyōji: Hotarubi no Maki (陰陽師 螢火ノ巻)	November 15, 2014 (tankōbon); June 8, 2017 (bunkoban)	978-4-16-390159-6 (tankōbon); 978-4-16-790861-4 (bunkoban)
13	Onmyōji: Gyokuto no Maki (陰陽師 玉兎ノ巻)	September 10, 2016 (tankōbon); June 6, 2019 (bunkoban)	978-4-16-390518-1 (tankōbon); 978-4-16-791291-8 (bunkoban)
14	Onmyōji: On'na Hebi no Maki (陰陽師 女蛇ノ巻)	February 28, 2019 (tankōbon)	978-4-16-390976-9 (tankōbon)
15	Onmyōji: Sui Ryu no Maki (陰陽師 水龍ノ巻)	August 4, 2021 (tankōbon)	978-4-16-391409-1 (tankōbon)

=== Novel length-stories ===
No.	Title	Release date	ISBN
1	Onmyōji: Namanari Hime (陰陽師 生成り姫)	March 15, 2000 (tankōbon); July 10, 2003 (bunkoban)	978-4-02-257498-5 (tankōbon); 978-4-16-752809-6 (bunkoban)
2	Onmyōji: Taki Yasha Hime Jō (陰陽師 瀧夜叉姫 上)	September 29, 2005 (tankōbon); September 3, 2008 (bunkoban)	978-4-16-324270-5 (tankōbon); 978-4-16-752817-1 (bunkoban)
3	Onmyōji: Taki Yasha Hime Shita (陰陽師 瀧夜叉姫 下)	September 29, 2005 (tankōbon); September 3, 2008 (bunkoban)	978-4-16-324280-4 (tankōbon); 978-4-16-752818-8 (bunkoban)

=== Picture books ===
No.	Title	Release date	ISBN
1	Onmyōji: Kobutori Seimei (陰陽師 瘤取り晴明)	October 30, 2001 (tankōbon); October 1, 2008 (bunkoban)	978-4-16-320480-2 (tankōbon); 978-4-16-752816-4 (bunkoban)
2	Onmyōji: Kubi (陰陽師 首)	October 13, 2003 (tankōbon); August 4, 2009 (bunkoban)	978-4-16-322270-7 (tankōbon); 978-4-16-752819-5 (bunkoban)
3	Onmyōji: Kanawa (陰陽師 鉄輪)	June 10, 2005 (tankōbon); September 3, 2008 (bunkoban)	978-4-16-324040-4 (tankōbon); 978-4-16-752822-5 (bunkoban)

== Adaptations ==
=== Films ===
- The stories were adapted into the 2001 film Onmyoji, followed by the 2003 sequel, Onmyoji II; both were directed by Yōjirō Takita.
- A Chinese adaptation of the original short stories and novels, titled The Yin-Yang Master: Dream of Eternity, was released in China on December 25, 2020, and outside China on Netflix on February 5, 2021
- A different Chinese film, titled The Yinyang Master, was released in China on February 12, 2021, and outside China on Netflix on March 19, 2021. This film is adapted from the video game Onmyoji, which is based on the Onmyōji series of short stories and novels.
- A prequel film, titled The Yin Yang Master Zero (陰陽師0, Onmyōji Zero), premiered on April 19, 2024; it was later released worldwide on Amazon Prime Video on October 18 of the same year.

=== Manga ===
A manga adaptation by Reiko Okano was serialized in two magazines between 1993 and 2005: It started in Schola's seinen manga magazine Comic Burger, where it ran from the July 1993 issue to the April 1996 issue. Afterward, Comic Burger was relaunched as Comic Birz, and the series ran from the July 1996 issue to the May 1999 issue. It then transferred to Hakusensha's josei manga magazine Melody, where it ran from the August 1999 issue to the May 2005 issue.

Schola compiled the series into tankōbon and released eight volumes between July 1994 and December 1998. Later, Hakusensha republished the older volumes with new volumes for a total of 13 tankōbon released between July 12, 1999, and September 29, 2005. The first seven volumes were published in France by Delcourt between 2007 and 2013. Music for Onmyo-Ji, an accompanying image album with manga artist Okano's participation as performer, was released in 2000.

An exhibit at the Kyoto International Manga Museum explored "the supernatural aspects of Kyoto" by using this manga as reference. The manga received the Grand Prize at the 2001 Tezuka Osamu Cultural Prizes. The series also received the Seiun Award for best science fiction comic in 2006. Also, in 2011, Paul Gravett included it in the book 1001 Comics You Must Read Before You Die.

A sequel manga series, also written by Okano, titled Onmyōji: Tamatebako (陰陽師 玉手匣), was announced on October 28, 2010, and was serialized in Melody from December 28, 2010, to April 28, 2017. Between December 28, 2011, and July 28, 2017, seven bound volumes were released by Hakusensha.

A manga adaptation of Onmyōji: Taki Yasha Hime written by Munku Mitsuki was serialized in Tokuma Shoten's magazine Monthly Comic Ryū between March 19, 2012, and December 20, 2015. Eight tankōbon volumes were released by Tokuma Shoten from September 13, 2012, to January 13, 2016.

=== Television ===
The novel has been adapted into three different television dramas. The first is a 10-episode series starring Goro Inagaki that was broadcast by NHK in 2001. The second is a TV movie starring Matsumoto Kōshirō X (then Ichikawa Somegorō VII) that was broadcast by TV Asahi in 2015. The third is another TV movie, starring Kuranosuke Sasaki, that was also broadcast on TV Asahi, on March 29, 2020.

=== Anime ===
An original net animation adaptation was announced during Netflix's Tudum virtual event in late September 2022. The series is directed by Soubi Yamamoto and produced by Marvy Jack, with scripts written by Natsu Hashimoto and Yuiko Kato. It premiered on Netflix on November 28, 2023.

==== Episodes ====
No.	Title	Original release date
1	"The Traveling Demon"; Transliteration: "Oni no Michiyuki" (Japanese: 鬼の道行き)	November 28, 2023
2	"The Head Minister"; Transliteration: "Kubi Daijin" (Japanese: 首大臣)	November 28, 2023
3	"Ashiya Doman"; Transliteration: "Ashiya Dōman" (Japanese: 蘆屋道満)	November 28, 2023
4	"A Rumor of Love"; Transliteration: "Koi Sute fu" (Japanese: 恋すてふ)	November 28, 2023
5	"Are You Lovesick?"; Transliteration: "Mono ya Omofu to" (Japanese: ものや思ふと)	November 28, 2023
6	"The Lady Who Loved Insects"; Transliteration: "Mushime Zuru Hime" (Japanese: むしめづる姫)	November 28, 2023
7	"Liveliness"; Transliteration: "Nigi wa Fuko to" (Japanese: にぎはふこと)	November 28, 2023
8	"The Fox's Child"; Transliteration: "Kitsune no Ko" (Japanese: 狐の子)	November 28, 2023
9	"A Contest of Magic at the Imperial Court"; Transliteration: "Kyūchū de Jutsu Kurabe o Suru Koto" (Japanese: 宮中で術くらべをすること)	November 28, 2023
10	"A Lost Curse"; Transliteration: "Useta Shu" (Japanese: 失せた呪(しゅ))	November 28, 2023
11	"Metamorphosis"; Transliteration: "Kinari" (Japanese: 生成り)	November 28, 2023
12	"The Lord Taizan Ceremony"; Transliteration: "Taizan Fukun-sai" (Japanese: 泰山府君祭)	November 28, 2023
13	"The Demon Within"; Transliteration: "Kokoro ni Yadoru Oni" (Japanese: 心に宿る鬼)	November 28, 2023
