= Music for Onmyo-Ji =

Soundtrack album by Reigakusya, Brian Eno and J. Peter Schwalm
- Released: March 2000
- Recorded: 2000
- Genre: Traditional Japanese music, electronic, ambient
- Length: Disc 1 - 78:59; Disc 2 - 28:17
- Label: JVC Victor
- Producer: Sukeyasu Shiba, Brian Eno with J. Peter Schwalm, and Reiko Okano

Brian Eno chronology
Kite Stories (1999)	Music for Onmyo-Ji (2000)	Music for Civic Recovery Centre (2000)

Professional ratings
Review scores
Source	Rating
AllMusic	2.5/5 stars
Rolling Stone	5/5 stars

Music for Onmyo-Ji (music for 陰陽師) is a two disc image album for Reiko Okano's manga adaptation of Baku Yumemakura's novel series of the same name. The first disc features performances by gagaku ensemble Reigakusya (伶楽舎), the second features performances by Brian Eno and J. Peter Schwalm.

== Track listing ==
=== CD1 ===
1. Sojo no Choshi Bongen - 4:52
2. Shundeika [Togaku Bugaku] - 7:55
3. Oshikicho no Choshi - 2:39
4. Jussuiraku [Togaku Kangen] - 4:45
5. Yoshinso [Biwa Hikyoku] - 3:03
6. Ichikotsucho no Sugagai - 1:38
7. Ryo-o Ranjo [Togaku Bugaku] - 9:03
8. Hyojo no Choshi - 2:51
9. Bairo no Ha [Togaku Bugaku] - 5:42
10. Asukai [Saibara] - 4:31
11. Banshikicho no Choshi - 4:58
12. Soko [Togaku Bugaku] - 14:28
13. Taishikicho no Choshi - 2:34
14. Chogeishi [Togaku Bugaku] - 2:58
15. Jisei [Roei] - 6:52

=== CD2 ===
1. Star Gods - 7:43
2. Six Small Pictures - 6:08
3. Connecting Heaven to Earth - 3:55
4. Little Lights - 4:33
5. The Milky Way - 2:33
6. Faraway Suns - 3:21

== Credits ==
=== CD1 ===
- Sukeyasu Shiba: Music Director (1-15), Ryuteki (1-4, 7–9, 12–14), Chorus (5), Saezuri (7), Ei (12)
- Ko Ishikawa: Shō (1-4, 8, 9, 11–14), Vocal (10), Chorus (5)
- Tamami Tono: Shō (1-5, 8, 9, 12–14)
- Kazue Tajima: Shō (1-4, 8, 9, 12–14)
- Remi Miura: Shō (1, 2, 8, 9), Shoko (4)
- Satoru Yaotani: Hichiriki (1-4, 8, 9, 12–14), Chorus (5)
- Katsuhiko Tabuchi: Hichiriki (1, 2, 8, 9, 12–14), Biwa (4), Dadaiko (7)
- Katsuyuki Kobayashi: Hichiriki (1-4, 8, 9, 12–14), Chorus (5)
- Aya Motohashi: Hichiriki (1-5, 8, 9, 12–14)
- Chiaki Yagi: Ryuteki (2, 7, 9, 12, 14), Biwa (4), Kakko (3, 4), Lead Vocal (5)
- Takeshi Sasamoto: Ryuteki (2, 5, 7, 9, 12, 14), Taiko (4)
- Kanako Nakamura: Ryuteki (2, 4, 7, 9, 12, 14)
- Kahoru Nakamura: Biwa (3-5)
- Naoko Miyamaru: Dadaiko (2, 9, 12, 14), Ryuteki (4), Kakko (3, 4), Shaku Byoshi (5)
- Yuko Hirai: Kakko (1, 2, 7–9, 12), So (4), Ryuteki (7), San-no-Tsuzumi (8, 9, 13, 14)
- Mika Noda: Daishoko (2, 7, 9, 12, 14), So (3-5)
- Reiko Okano: Wagon (6, 10)
- Ayumi Shimonoto: Vocal (15)
- Ichiko Hashimoto: Piano (15)
- Keishi Urata: Sound Architect (1-15)
- Seiichi Takubo: Synthesizer Operator (1-15)

=== CD2 ===
- Music written, produced and performed by Brian Eno with J. Peter Schwalm.
- Voice: Kyoko Inatome
- Translation: Charmian Norman-Taylor
- Published by Opal Music
- J. Peter Schwalm published by Edition Outshine/BMG UFA

== Music for Onmyo-Ji Staff ==
- Produced by: Reiko Okano
- Director: Yoshimoto Ishikawa (Victor Entertainment, Inc./JVC)
- Recording Engineer: Keiichiro Yoshioka (Victor Aoyama Studio, Disc 1)
- Assistant Engineers: Makoto Hoshino, Akitomo Takakuwa
- Mastering Engineer: Kazushige Yamazaki
- Art Director: Shin Sobue
- Original Illustration: Reiko Okano
- CG for Hologram: Takeshi Sawai, Tomohide Shigemura, Taro Kimura (Bus Plus One)
- Editor: Yukio Yui (Victor Entertainment, Inc.)
- Printing: Kinyosya Printing Co. Ltd.
- Promotion Manager: Ikuo Kawasaki (Victor Entertainment, Inc.)
- Promotion Staff: You Saito, Shiho Miyai (Victor Entertainment, Inc.)
- Sales Promotion Manager: Akifumi Nkamura (Victor Entertainment, Inc.)
- Sales Promotion Staff: Tetsuya Yamada, Hiroshi Yamashita (Victor Entertainment, Inc.)
- Manager: Shiro Sasaki (Victor Entertainment, Inc.)
- Senior Manager: Norio Uchiyama (Victor Entertainment, Inc.)
- Special thanks to: Baku Yumemakura, Anthea Norman-Taylor, Charmian Norman-Taylor, Catherine Dempsey, Ray Hearn, Keiko Ishihara (Beatink), Alastair Prentice, Miki Nagata Prentice, Macoto Tezka, Hiroyuki Nakajo (Yumemakura Baku Office Ltd.), Haruto Uchiyama, Yasufumi Takagi (Hakusensha), Osamu Kato (Asahi Shimbun), Chiaki Ohtsu (Coz-Fish), Mayumi Komatsu, Norn Noemi, Shugo Kasuga, Takashi Otsuyama, Keiya Takahashi, Yasuko Makino
- Onmyo-Ji Author: Reiko Okano
- Original Story: Baku Yumemakura
