= Mansai Nomura =

Japanese actor

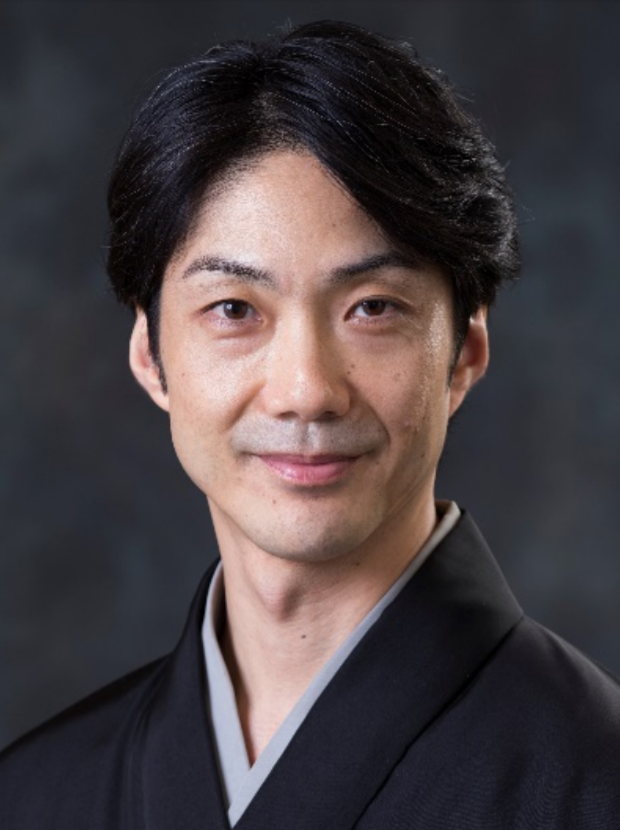
- Born: Takeshi Nomura; 5 April 1966 (age 60); Tokyo, Japan
- Occupation: Actor
- Father: Mansaku Nomura

Nomura Mansai II (二世 野村 萬斎, Nisei Nomura Mansai; born Takeshi Nomura (野村 武司); April 5, 1966) is a Japanese kyōgen and film actor and son of Mansaku Nomura. He played Abe no Seimei in Onmyoji and Onmyoji 2, an original work by Baku Yumemakura. He received the Best Actor prize at the Blue Ribbon Awards for his work in Onmyoji.

== Career ==
His debut was at the age of three in the drama, Quiver of The Monkey. Since then he has also been cast in the dramas: in Aguri in 1997, for which he played dadaist poet Eisuke Yoshiyuki and had won many awards, and in Hana no Ran in 1994.

He also had a supporting role in Akira Kurosawa's last epic motion picture Ran, as the blind flute playing hermit boy, Tsurumaru. He portrayed Godzilla through motion capture in Shin Godzilla.

Mansai was nominated by the Japanese Academy for best actor for his performance in The Floating Castle.

In March 2013, he appeared at the Japan Society and the Guggenheim Museum Rotunda in two productions: Shakespeare's Macbeth adapted to the noh and kyogen traditions with five actors, performed in Japanese with English subtitles and Sanbaso, Divine Dance.

On July 30, 2018, Mansai was appointed chief executive creative director of the Tokyo 2020 Olympic and Paralympic Games. Between July 2018 and December 2020, he oversaw planning for opening and closing ceremonies of both Games, before stepping down from the role as the original ceremony team disbanded.

On December 27, 2024, it was announced that Mansai would appear as a special guest at the ice show Yuzuru Hanyu Notte Stellata 2025, hosted by professional figure skater Yuzuru Hanyu. In addition to performing in a collaboration, he also serves as the program director.

== Filmography ==
=== Film ===
- Ran (1985), Tsurumaru
- The Yin Yang Master (2001), Abe no Seimei
- The Yin Yang Master 2 (2003), Abe no Seimei
- The Floating Castle (2012), Narita Nagachika
- The Wind Rises (2013), Giovanni Battista Caproni (voice)
- Shin Godzilla (2016), Godzilla through motion capture
- Flower and Sword (2017), Ikenobō Senkō
- Whistleblower (2019), Tamio Yasumi
- Revolver Lily (2023), Takita
- What If Shogun Ieyasu Tokugawa Was to Become the Prime Minister (2024), Tokugawa Ieyasu

=== Television ===
- Hana no Ran (1994), Hosokawa Katsumoto
- Aguri (1997), Eisuke
- Doctor-X: Surgeon Michiko Daimon (2021), Hachisuka Ryutaro
- What Will You Do, Ieyasu? (2023), Imagawa Yoshimoto
- Antihero (2024), Taisuke Datehara
