= J. Peter Schwalm =

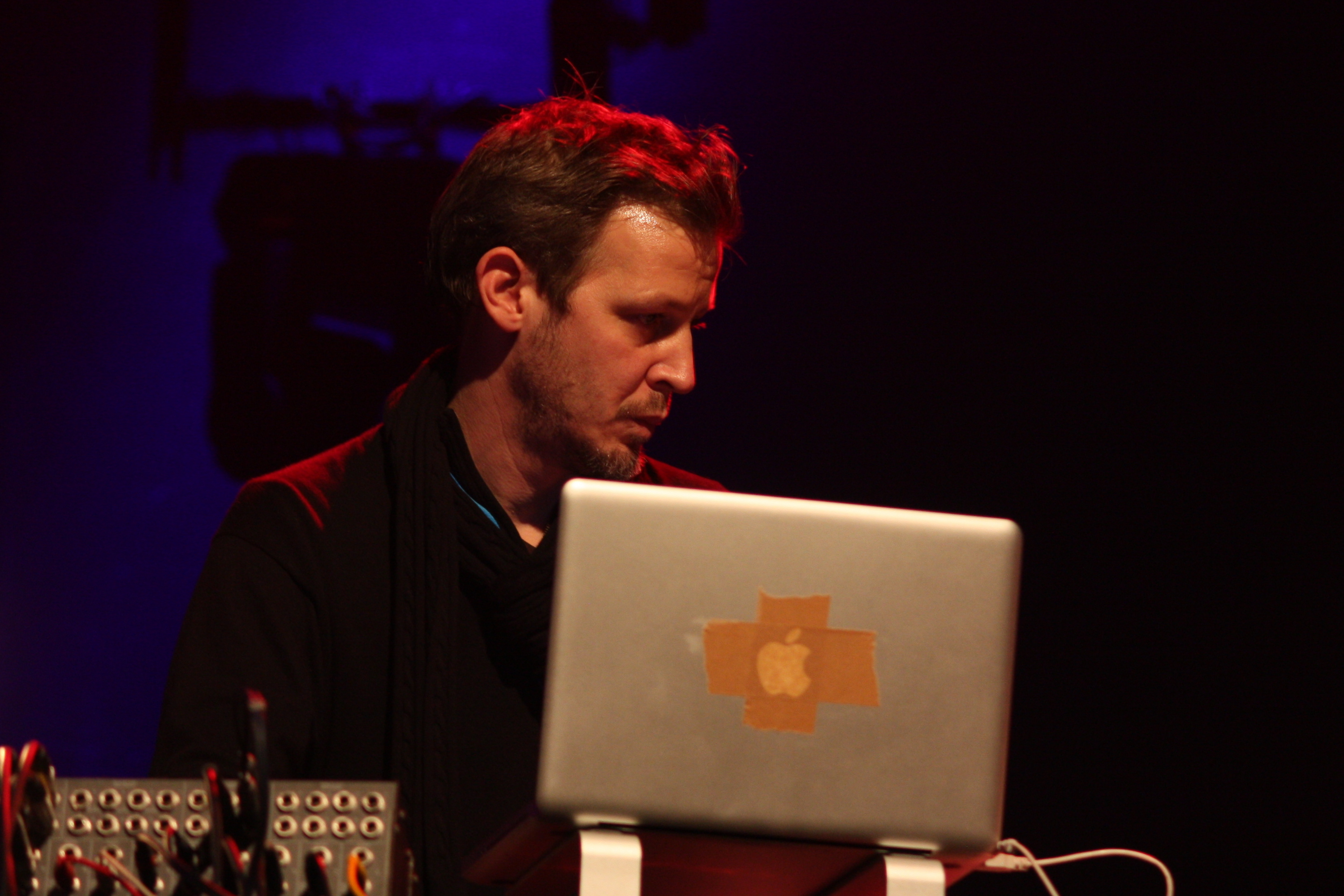
J. Peter Schwalm at the Deutsches Jazzfestival, 2013.

J. Peter Schwalm (born 1970, Frankfurt am Main) is a German composer and music producer, active in the fields of electronic music, ambient, radio drama, film, theatre and ballet. He is best known for his work with musician Brian Eno. He lives and works in Frankfurt.

== Biography ==
Schwalm studied at the Musikwerkstatt in Frankfurt am Main between 1989 and 1991, specialising in drumming. In 1993 he founded the experimental electro-jazz Projekt Slop Shop. Work from this project was released on the Frankfurt label Infracom.

In 1996 Schwalm founded the label Poets Club Records, on which he released a series of 12" singles, as well as compilations of electronica, nu jazz and drum and bass. His first album with Projekt Slop Shop,Makrodelia, was released on the label in 1998, and caught the attention of a number of significant musicians such as Brian Eno, Peter Kruder and Ryuichi Sakamoto.

As a result, Eno proposed a collaboration, which resulted, only a few months later, in an appearance together at the Kunst- und Ausstellungshalle der Bundesrepublik Deutschland, also featuring Holger Czukay, bass-player Raoul Walton and drummer Jem Atai. Schwalm and Eno continued to work together on a mixture of projects, including two albums, Music for Onmyo-Ji (2000 JVC Victor) and Drawn from Life (2001 Venture/Virgin Music U.K.).

In addition Schwalm and Eno collaborated on a multi-channel sound installation in the crater of the Volcano del Cuervo on Lanzarote. Schwalm explained the concept and working method of this project in an interview with the German music magazine Keyboards. In order to promote their album Drawn from Life, Schwalm and Eno undertook a tour in 2002, which took them as far afield as Japan, Spain and Portugal. Schwalm was also involved in Artists Against AIDS Worldwide, a project initiated by Bono, going under the title of what's going on. In 2003 Schwalm and Eno worked together on film music for Nicolas Winding Refn's Film Fear X.

In 2006 Schwalm was involved in Wagner Reloaded, a project involving many different reworkings of Richard Wagner's music. Schwalm's contribution was performed by the Kristiansand Symphony Orchestra as part of the Punktfestival in Kristiansand, Norway.

In the same year Schwalm released his first solo CD under his own name. The result Musikain, mixed a variety of music styles and incorporated the work of a number of guest vocalists, including Kari Kleiv, Imogen Heap and Eno himself.

Other work includes music for Das neue Werk, a series of concerts for Norddeutscher Rundfunk, for which composers such as Karlheinz Stockhausen, Pierre Boulez, Krzysztof Penderecki und György Ligeti produced new work. He was commissioned to write a work for Stuttgart Ballet for a production by the choreographer James Sutherland, with the title Impaired Ground, and he also wrote music for the Sheffield Lyceum Theatre's production of Don't Look Now, which was also seen at the Lyric Theatre Hammersmith in London.

Since 2008 Schwalm has worked frequently with the guitarist Eivind Aarset, including performances at the Punktfestival in Norway, the Enjoy Jazz Festival in Mannheim and in the Rolf Liebermann Studio in Hamburg

In 2013 he was commissioned by the British ensemble Icebreaker to create a reworking of music by Kraftwerk, for their project Kraftwerk Uncovered, which premiered at the Science Museum in London in January 2014, before touring, accompanied by a new film by Sophie Clements and Toby Cornish.

In June 2018, Schwalm released an album entitled How We Fall on RareNoise Records, featuring Eivind Aarset and Tim Harries.

== Discography (selection) ==
- Slop Shop: Makrodelia (CD/LP) (Poets Club, 1998)
- Slop Shop: Makrodelia 2 (CD/LP) (Poets Club, 2000)
- Brian Eno with J. Peter Schwalm: Music for Onmyo-Ji (2CD) (JVC, 2000)
- Brian Eno & J. Peter Schwalm: Drawn from Life (CD/LP) (Venture/Virgin UK, 2001)
- Slop Shop: Interpretations (CD) (Poets Club, 2002)
- J. Peter Schwalm: Musikain (CD) (Musikain, 2006)
- J. Peter Schwalm: Wagner Transformed (CD) (Intergroove, 2013)
- J. Peter Schwalm: The Beauty of Disaster (CD/LP) (RareNoise, 2016)
- J. Peter Schwalm: How We Fall (CD) (RareNoise, 2018)

== Music for Films ==
- Fear X (2002)
- Geschenk der Sprachen (2005)
- Hey Uni (BR 2015)
- Campus (BR 2016)
- Nach der Arbeit (2021)

== Live Projects ==
- Das Neue Werk (with Sophie Clements NDR Kultur, 2010)
- Kraftwerk Uncovered: A Future Past (with Icebreaker and with Sophie Clements, Science Museum London, 2014)
- Skrjabin (mit Michael Wollny NDR Kultur Neo Klubkonzert Mojo Club Hamburg, 2015)
- Frankfurter Kunstverein with Sophie Clements (2016)
- Mein Lieblingsstück Alte Oper Frankfurt (2016)
- Local Listener (with Gregor Praml Mousonturm Frankfurt (2018)

== Theater ==
- Don't look now Lyceum Theatre Sheffield (2007)

== Ballet ==
- Impaired Ground Staatstheater Stuttgart (1999)
