= Mansaku Nomura =

- 野村万作
- Born: Jirou Nomura; June 22, 1931 (age 95)
- Occupation: Kyogen performer
- Children: Mansai Nomura

Mansaku Nomura II (二世 野村 万作, Nisei Nomura Mansaku; born Jirou Nomura (野村 二朗); June 22, 1931) is a kyōgen performer and Living National Treasure. He is the founder and current head of the Mansaku no Kai theatre troupe. He has been recognized as a Person of Cultural Merit, and an Intangible Cultural Property of Japan. He is also a member of the Japan Art Academy and an honorary citizen of Nerima. In 2025, a documentary 6 Faces (六つの顔) about his life was released in theatres.

He married Wakabako Sakamoto, the oldest daughter of poet Etsurou Sakamoto, and has 4 children including Mansai Nomura. Mansai and his oldest son, Yuuki, are also kyogen performers who perform with Mansaku.

His older brother is Manzou Nomura VII, and his younger brothers were Shirou and Mannosuke Nomura, all of whom are also kyogen performers.
