= Fancy Dance (manga) =

Japanese shōjo manga series by Reiko Okano

ファンシィダンス
- Manga
- Written by: Reiko Okano
- Published by: Shogakukan
- Magazine: Petit Flower
- Original run: 1984 – 1990
- Live-action film
- Directed by: Masayuki Suo
- Released: December 23, 1989

Fancy Dance (ファンシィダンス) is a Japanese shōjo manga series by Reiko Okano. It won the 34th Shogakukan Manga Award for shōjo. It was adapted into a 1989 live action film directed by Masayuki Suo and starring Masahiro Motoki.
