= January 07003: Bell Studies for the Clock of the Long Now =

Studio album by Brian Eno
- Released: 2003
- Recorded: 2003
- Genre: Ambient
- Length: 75:40
- Label: Opal
- Producer: Brian Eno

Brian Eno chronology
Drawn from Life (2001)	January 07003: Bell Studies for the Clock of the Long Now (2003)	Another Day on Earth (2005)

Professional ratings
Review scores
Source	Rating
AllMusic	4/5 stars
Rolling Stone	4/5 stars

January 07003: Bell Studies for the Clock of the Long Now is the 21st solo studio album by the English musician Brian Eno, released in 2003. It was an album of studies made for the Long Now Foundation, an organisation founded in 1996 that aims to "provide a counterpoint to what it views as today's 'faster/cheaper' mindset and to promote 'slower/better' thinking".

== Overview ==
One of the Long Now Foundation's projects is the construction of a clock, designed by W. Daniel Hillis, intended to keep time for 10,000 years. The first prototype of the clock is working and on permanent display at the London Science Museum. Eno, a member of the foundation, created this album both as a tribute to the project, and as an artistic expression of the vast swathes of time represented by the sheer "long-termness" of the philosophy behind the clock. About the workings of the record, Eno stated that he "naturally wondered what kind of sound it could make to announce the passage of time" and that he "had nurtured an interest in bells for many years, and this seemed like a good alibi for taking it a bit deeper".

The sounds on the album are entirely synthesizer-based, although Eno studied the actual physics of bell tones in order to simulate the kinds of bells familiar to modern ears. He also tried to imagine what bells might sound like in the future, which took him "out of the bounds of current physical and material possibilities .... imagine bells with quite different physical properties from those we now know". To that end, mathematical algorithms were also used to generate some of the sounds; Eno also made use of his generative software. Most of the tracks are also accompanied by a variety of standard, synth-based ambient backdrops and drones. Profits from the sale of this album are donated to the Long Now Foundation.

== Track listing ==
All songs composed by Brian Eno.

1. Fixed ratio harmonic bells - 23:22
2. Changes where bell number = repeat number - 03:30
3. 2 harmonic studies - 06:05
4. Deep glass bells (with harmonic clouds) - 03:17
5. Dark cracked bells with bass - 01:59
6. German-style ringing - 03:19
7. Emphasizing enharmonic partials - 03:01
8. Changes for January 07003, soft bells, Hillis algorithm - 10:40
9. Lithuanian bell study - 01:26
10. Large bell change improvisation - 01:23
11. Reverse harmonics bells - 02:45
12. Bell Improvisation 2 - 01:40
13. Virtual dream bells, thick glass - 03:59
14. Tsar Kolokol III (and friends) - 03:59
15. 1–14 January 07003, hard bells, Hillis algorithm - 05:09

Later, the same year, a short CD was sent out to wine dealers to promote Pelissero's Long Now wine (named in honour of the foundation). It included a further five Bell Studies; some being variants of existing material and others previously unreleased. The interactive track on the CD has nothing to do with Eno. The track listing was as follows:

1. Study 16 (x5, x3, series ratios) - 2:32
2. Study 17 (pythagorean ratios) - 4:12
3. If a bell became a drone... - 2:14
4. Campion Bells (invert harmonics) - 2:25
5. Bell Study with distant delays - 5:22

== Versions ==
- Opal, OPALCD 02
