= Triple yin yang =

Triple yin yang may refer to:

- the Korean Sam Saeg-ui Taegeuk
- the Tibetan Buddhist Gankyil
- various forms of triskelion
