= The Yin-Yang Master: Dream of Eternity =

2020 Chinese fantasy film

- Film poster
- Chinese: 阴阳师: 晴雅集
- Directed by: Guo Jingming
- Written by: Guo Jingming
- Starring: Deng Lun; Mark Chao; Olivia Wang; Wang Duo
- Cinematography: Randy Che
- Music by: Kenji Kawai
- Production company: Hehe Pictures
- Distributed by: Netflix
- Release date: 25 December 2020
- Running time: 132 minutes
- Country: China
- Language: Mandarin
- Box office: ¥452 million

The Yin-Yang Master: Dream of Eternity (Chinese: 阴阳师: 晴雅集) is a 2020 Chinese fantasy film directed by Guo Jingming and starring Mark Chao, Deng Lun, and Duo Wang. It is adapted from the Japanese novel Onmyōji, written by Baku Yumemakura. It was filmed in 2019 and released in China on 25 December 2020. Streaming rights were purchased by Netflix before the film's theatrical release. The Yin-Yang Master was a box office success, and it brought in a record of ¥452 million, ten days after its theatrical release.

== Plot ==
Centuries ago, a malevolent serpent demon was born from the desires of humans. Four masters gathered together to trap the snake within the Imperial City, sealing it within the body of the empress, protected by four stone guardians. Since then, whenever the serpent threatens to emerge, four masters have to travel to the Imperial City to awaken the four stone guardians. With the threat of the evil serpent rising once more, four masters come together in the Imperial City: Hongruo, Longye, Boya, and Qingming.

Qingming and Boya immediately get off on the wrong foot over their opposing view of demons but are soon forced to cooperate when Hongruo is killed in his sleep by a Hair Demon. The empress orders Princess Changping to investigate Hongruo's death and instates the palace priest He Shouyue as Hongruo's replacement. Noticing that Shouyue bears an uncanny resemblance to his late master, Zhongxing, Qingming confronts him and learns that Shouyue is a Spirit Guardian of Zhongxing, sent to protect the empress. However, as a result of Zhongxing's death, Shouyue is also slowly dying.

After a failed assassination attempt on the empress, discord grows. The masters suspect each other and investigate independently. Longye is eventually accused but falls victim to the Hair Demon before she can disclose what she had discovered. With her dying breath, Longye attempts to communicate her discovery to Qingming, who interprets the message as an accusation against the princess. Unwilling to believe the princess is the criminal, Boya insists Shouyue must be the culprit. Qingming and Boya decide to confront the princess and Shouyue separately. Meanwhile, the princess angrily confronts Shouyue, with whom she is in league, for killing Hongruo and Longye. Shouyue reasons that their deaths were justifiable and that in order to keep their plans a secret, Boya and Qingming must also die.

When Qingming confronts the princess, she is attacked by the Hair Demon. Qingming hunts the Hair Demon down and learns that the demon had been waiting to avenge her own death on the princess for sixty years. Realizing that the princess has not aged a day in the past sixty years, Qingming surmises that she must actually be the real empress and thus the true vessel of the serpent.

Qingming and Boya confront the princess and Shouyue together and learn of their true plan: in order to save Shouyue from dying, he must become the new vessel of the serpent, rendering him immortal. For this to work, the serpent must be allowed to rise. While the princess gives birth to the serpent, she remembers her first meeting with Qingming's late master, Zhongxing. Years ago, the two had fallen in love and the princess had revealed her true identity—the centuries-old immortal vessel of the serpent—to Zhongxing as well as her original name, Fangyue. Knowing that desire would strengthen the serpent within her, Zhongxing left the Imperial City to prevent the princess's feelings from growing. Before leaving, he created the Spirit Guardian He Shouyue in order to protect her, who later took Zhongxing's form to please the princess.

The princess and Shouyue flee on the now giant serpent, with Boya and Qingming in pursuit. After noticing the chaos created by the serpent, the princess realizes the error of her ways and attempts to commit suicide with Shouyue, but both are swallowed by the serpent. Boya notices that only three of the four stone guardians have awakened, as Shouyue did not rouse the guardian appointed to him to allow the serpent to leave the Imperial City. Shouyue, now the new vessel for the serpent, emerges and fights Boya, Qingming, and the Spirit Guardians that Qingming conjures: Snow Hound, Killing Stone, and Mad Painter. Boya leaves to wake the last of the four stone guardians, the Crimson Bird. During this process, Boya collapses and becomes a Spirit Guardian himself, in the form of the Crimson Bird. While the Crimson Bird and Shouyue battle each other, Qingming teleports inside the serpent, where he shows the princess the last memory he has with Zhongxing. Zhongxing confesses he has always loved the princess and encourages her to do the right thing. Qingming and the princess teleport outside, and the princess, no longer immortal as she is no longer the vessel of the serpent, kills herself with the sword Zhongxing named after her, Fangyue. Distracted by this, Shouyue is impaled by the Crimson Bird. As the serpent collapses, the Crimson Bird sacrifices himself in order to save Qingming. Shouyue rises from the serpent's ashes and hurls a sword at Boya's unconscious body, but Qingming throws himself in front of the sword and reaches a moment of clarity where he realizes the true meaning of being a Yin-Yang Master. He successfully deflects the sword from Boya and kills Shouyue.

Boya awakens, and the two friends say their goodbyes, while the entombed Longye is shown to still be alive.

== Cast ==
- Mark Chao as Master Qingming, the recently appointed Yin-Yang Master, whose mother was a rumored Fox Demon.
- Deng Lun as Master Boya, a friend of Princess Changping, who hates demons
- Duo Wang as both He Shouyue, the Spirit Guardian serving in the Imperial Palace as the High Priest, and as Master Zhongxing, the previous Yin-Yang Master and Qingming's mentor
- Olivia Wang as Princess Changping, a senior member of the imperial family
- Jessie Li as Master Longye, a master who uses insects and other animals for her magic
- Sun Chenjun as Killing Stone, a demon who becomes a Spirit Guardian for Qingming
- Xu Kaicheng as Mad Painter, a Spirit Guardian for the Yin-Yang Masters, who wields a brush
- Jasper as Snow Hound, an angelic Spirit Guardian of the Yin-Yang Masters
- Lu Zhanxiang as Golden Spirit, a young Spirit Guardian of Master Zhongxing
- Qing Wang as the Hair Demon, a demon who has been waiting for revenge for sixty years

== Soundtrack ==
No.	Title	Performer	Length
1.	"Tomb of Infatuation 痴情冢"	Deng Lun	05:08

On 28 December 2020, Deng Lun's closing credits song, titled "Tomb of Infatuation", hit No. 1 on QQ Music, KuGou Music, and DouYin. On 5–6 January 2021, the song reached No. 1 on the Asian New Songs Chart. It also attained the No. 1 spot in Migu Music's OST ranking chart in the first half of 2021.
