= The Yinyang Master =

- Film poster
- Chinese: 侍神令
- Directed by: Li Weiran
- Written by: Even Jian
- Produced by: Chen Kuo-fu; Chia-Lu Chang; Kun Tao; Zheng Yin
- Starring: Chen Kun; Zhou Xun; William Chan; Qu Chuxiao
- Cinematography: Wang Boxue
- Edited by: Zhang Weili
- Music by: Shigeru Umebayashi
- Production company: CKF Pictures
- Distributed by: CKF Pictures; Netflix
- Release dates: 12 February 2021 (China); 19 March 2021 (Netflix)
- Running time: 120 minutes
- Country: China
- Language: Mandarin

The Yinyang Master (Chinese: 侍神令) is a 2021 Chinese fantasy film directed by Li Weiran and starring Chen Kun and Zhou Xun. It is adapted from the NetEase game Onmyōji (which in turn is based on the novel series, Onmyōji by author Baku Yumemakura). It was filmed in 2018, and was released in China on the first day of the Chinese New Year on 12 February 2021. Netflix, which has acquired the international streaming rights, released the film on March 19, 2021, as The Yin Yang Master.

== Synopsis ==
Qing Ming, a Yinyang Master, is a half-human half-demon officer of the Yinyang Bureau guarding demon souls and a supernatural artifact called the Scale Stone. After he is framed for the death of a guard team and his senior, Cimu, he escapes and starts a new life, traveling between the human and demon worlds.

Seven years later, when the demon king threatens to return, Qing Ming becomes embroiled in the robbery of Imperial tributes being delivered by Boya. He is also hunted by Bai Ni, head of the Yinyang Bureau, with whom he had a pact. Trapped in a fighting arena in the demon world, Qing Ming escapes with an injured Bai Ni, Boya and their friends. It is revealed that Qing Ming has been caring for and training a team of demons to fight against the Demon King’s return. Bai Ni is healed by Qing Ming and recovers the Scale Stone which had been inadvertently swallowed by one of Qing Ming’s demons. On her way back to the Bureau, Bai Ni is ambushed by Cimu and his henchwoman the Snow Lady, and the Scale Stone is stolen. Cimu is revealed to have coveted monster power since seeing Qing Ming demonstrate it when they were younger, and he makes the Snow Lady his familiar in order to hatch a plan to steal the Scale Stone. In the present time, Cimu uses the retrieved Scale Stone to turn himself into a powerful demon and uses his new power to start a demon invasion of the human world.

While Boya and Qing Ming’s demons defend the bridge between the two worlds, Cimu defeats Qing Ming, who has to make a bargain with the Demon King to obtain his powers. He defeats Cimu and releases his bond with Bai Ni, Boya and his demons, electing to leave them in the human world while he returns to the demon world.

== Cast ==
- Chen Kun as Qing Ming
- Zhou Xun as Bai Ni
- William Chan as Ci Mu
- Qu Chuxiao as Yuan Boya
- Wang Likun as Peach Blossom Spirit
- Shen Yue as Shen Le
- Wang Zixuan as Snow Queen
- Wang Ruiyi as Butterfly Spirit

== Soundtrack ==
No.	Title	Performer	Length
1.	"Promise 侍约"	William Chan	04:44
2.	"Where You Belong 归处"	Zhou Shen	04:10
3.	"Cross Together 同渡"	Jin Wenqi	04:59
4.	"An Enemy or Friend 宿敌亲启"	Feng Qinyuan	05:08
5.	"Against the Shore 靠岸"	Zhi Ma Mochi	04:05
6.	"Someone in the Heart 心有所主"	Jill Yan Qier	03:16

== Awards and nominations ==
Award	Category	Recipients	Result
13th Macau International Movie Festival	Best Actress	Zhou Xun	Nominated
13th Macau International Movie Festival	Best Supporting Actor	William Chan	Nominated
