= Reiko Okano =

Japanese manga artist

- Born: June 24, 1960 (age 66); Koga, Ibaraki, Japan
- Occupation: Manga artist
- Spouse: Makoto Tezuka
- Awards: Shogakukan Manga Award (1989); Tezuka Osamu Cultural Prize (2001)
- Website: Reiko Okano's homepage

Reiko Okano (岡野 玲子, Okano Reiko; born 24 June 1960) is a Japanese manga artist.

== Career ==
Okano was born in Ibaraki Prefecture. She attended a graphic design school after graduating from high school and has never worked as a manga assistant. Her first published work as a professional manga artist was Esther, Please in 1982 in the shōjo manga magazine Petit Flower. In the same magazine, in 1984, she started publishing the series Fancy Dance about a Buddhist monk who is trained in becoming the new head of the temple. In 1989, she won the Shogakukan Manga Award in the shōjo category for Fancy Dance. The same year, the series was adapted into a live-action film directed by Masayuki Suo.

In the 1990s, she published manga in magazines like Big Comic Spirits, Comic Tom and Comic Burger. For the series Onmyōji, based on an original work by Baku Yumemakura, she received the Tezuka Osamu Cultural Prize in 2001 and the Seiun Award in 2006. It was also selected by the jury of the Japan Media Arts Festival 2001. It is considered her most famous work. She went on to produce a sequel version, Onmyōji: Tamatebako, which was serialized from 2011 until 2017 in the comic magazine Melody.

== Style ==
Okano publishes manga in magazines across different gendered categories, including shōjo manga, josei manga and seinen manga. Tomoko Yamada assesses that her style is influenced by sentiments of women's media: "One can see this in the graceful beauty of the conduct of Okano's characters, the picturesque and polished structure of every frame, and the emphasis on subtlety in story development."

Her drawing style is influenced by illustrator Motoichiro Takebe. Since Onmyōji, she uses brush and ink in reference to Japanese painting.

== Personal life ==
She is married to director Makoto Tezuka, the son of famous manga artist Osamu Tezuka.

== Works ==
| Title | Year | Notes | Refs |
|---|---|---|---|
| Kiesarishi Mono (消え去りしもの) | 1984–1985 | Serialized in Peppermint; Published by Shinshokan in 1 vol. | |
| Fancy Dance (ファンシィダンス) | 1984–1990 | Serialized in Petit Flower; Published by Shogakukan in 8 vol. | |
| Diane de Rose no Inbō (ディアーヌ・ド・ロゼの陰謀) | 1986–1987 | Serialized in Peppermint; Published by Shinshokan in 1 vol. | |
| Ryōgoku Oshare Tōshi (両国花錦闘士) | 1989–1990 | Serialized in Big Comic Spirits; Published by Shogakukan in 4 vol. | |
| Calling (コーリング) | 1991–1993 | Serialized in Comic Tom; Published by Magazine House in 3 vol. | |
| Onmyōji (陰陽師) | 1993–2005 | Serialized in Comic Burger, Comic Birz and Melody; Published by Schola and Hakusensha in 13 vol. | |
| Yōmi Henjō Yawa (妖魅変成夜話) | 1995–2007 | Serialized in Panja and Hyakka; Published by Heibonsha in 3 vol. | |
| Inanna (イナンナ) | 2007–2010 | Serialized in Morning; Published by Kodansha in 2 vol. | |
| Onmyōji: Tamatebako (陰陽師 玉手匣) | 2011–2017 | Serialized in Melody; Published by Hakusensha in 7 vol. | |
