= Baku Yumemakura =

Japanese science fiction and adventure writer

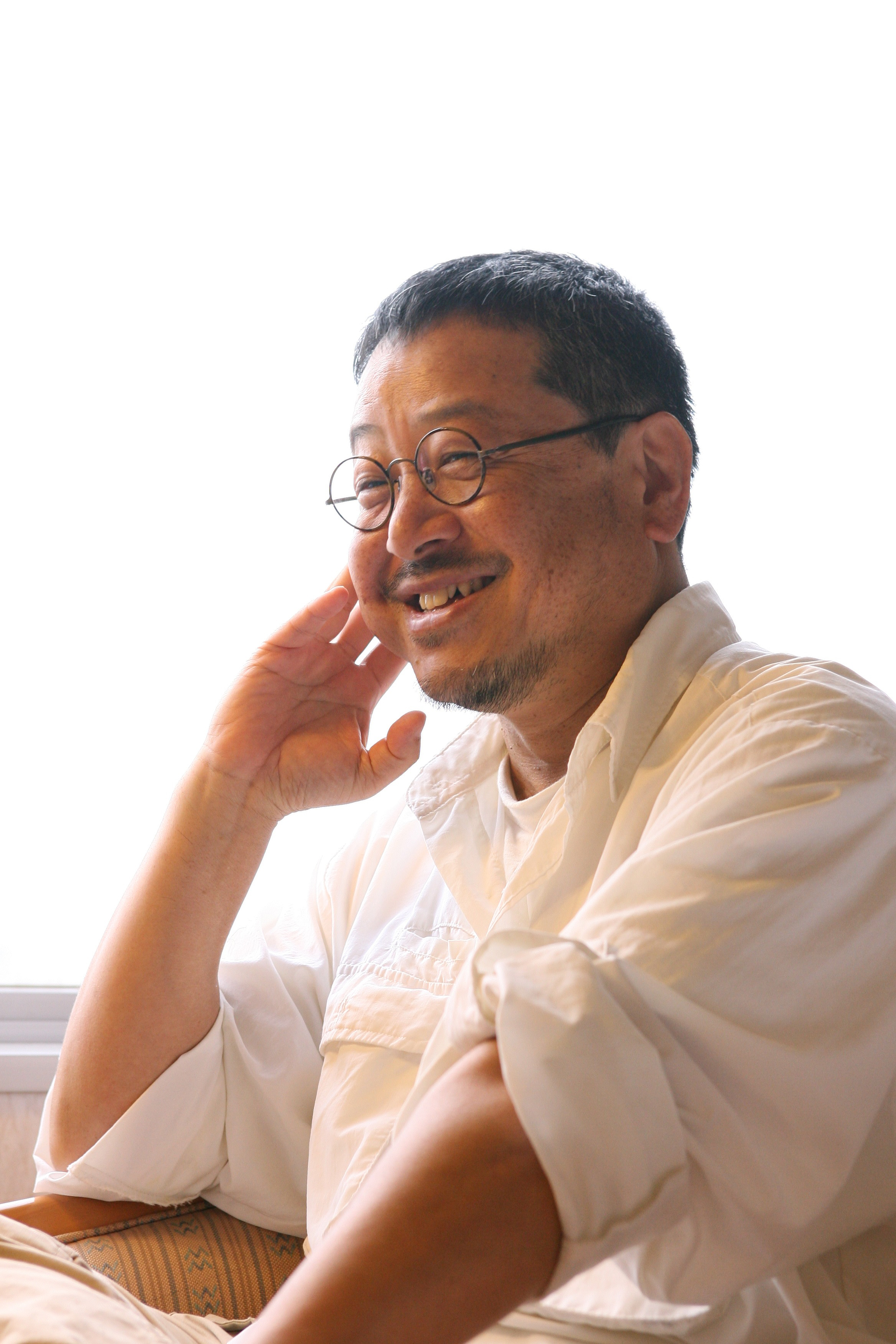
- Born: January 1, 1951 (age 75); Japan; Odawara, Kanagawa
- Occupation: Author
- Writing career
- Language: Japanese
- Genres: Science fiction, adventure, fantasy
- Notable works: The Summit of the Gods, Onmyōji, Majūgari, Garōden
- Notable awards: 1989 Nihon SF Taisho Award; Seiun Award for Jogen no Tsuki wo Taberu Shishi; 1998 Shibata Renzuburo Award for Kamigami no Itadaki; 2001 Tezuka Osamu Cultural Prize for Onmyoji a manga version drawn by Reiko Okano; 2001 Japan Media Arts Festival for Kamigami no Itadaki, a manga version drawn by Jiro Taniguchi; 2011 Izumi Kyōka Prize for Literature for O-Edo Chokaku-den; 2011 Funabashi Sei-ichi award for O-Edo Chokaku-den; 2012 Yoshikawa Eiji Award for O-Edo Chokaku-den
- Website: www.yumemakurabaku.com

Baku Yumemakura (夢枕 獏, Yumemakura Baku; born 1951 in Odawara, Kanagawa) (real name: Yoneyama Mineo (米山峰夫)) is a Japanese science fiction and adventure writer whose penname translates to Dream Pillow (Yumemakura) Tapir (Baku). His works have sold more than 20 million copies in Japan spread across more than 280 titles and adapted into a variety of formats including feature films, television shows, movies and comic books.

His works are influenced by outdoor interests such as fishing, particularly Ayu fishing, mountain climbing, canoeing as well as manga, photography, pottery, art, calligraphy, martial arts. He has published a number of photo collections of his journeys through Nepalese mountains.

He is best known for writing Jōgen no Tsuki wo Taberu Shishi (The Lion that Ate the Crescent Moon), which won both the Seiun Award and the Nihon SF Taisho Award. He also has written film scripts, including the one to Onmyōji.

One of his popular martial arts serials that has been adapted into manga is Garōden (餓狼伝), which has also been adapted to two video games and a movie.

His novel series Majūgari (also known as Demon Hunters) has been adapted into an anime OVA Psycho Diver: Soul Siren and three manga series.

He's been nicknamed "the artisan of violence" due to one of his popular martial arts novel series, Shishi no Mon (獅子の門, Gate of Fierce Lions). As of 2014, he has been working on the scripts for the manga series Shin Garōden with renowned manga artist Masami Nobe.

He is also a past president of the Science Fiction and Fantasy Writers of Japan organization.

== Early life ==
Baku Yumemakura was born on January 1, 1951, in Odawara-shi. At the age of 22, he graduated from Tokai University with a degree in Japanese literature. In 1975, he visited Nepal for the first time; the region would become host to one of his most popular works, The Summit of the Gods, which was adapted into the French animated film Le Sommet des Dieux in 2021.

== Career beginnings ==
In 1977, his first works were published in the science fiction coterie magazines Neo Null (curated by Yasutaka Tsutsui) and Uchūjin (curated by Takumi Shibano). A typographic experiment story titled Kaeru no Shi, dubbed as "Typografiction", was published in Neo Null and received a great deal of attention within the industry; it was reprinted in the science fiction magazine Kisou Tengai, which became his first appearance in commercial magazine. He followed this success by releasing the novella Kyojin Den and enjoyed enough success to become a full-time author. His first standalone title, Nekohiki no Oruorane, was published in the Shueisha Cobalt Collection in 1979. His first full-length novel, Genjū Henge, was published two years later by Futabasha Corporation. Then, in 1982, the first volume of the Kimaira Kou Series, Genjū Shōnen Kimaira, was published by Asahi Sonorama Paperbacks, with cover and illustrations by Yoshitaka Amano. The Majūgari trilogy was published by Shodensha in 1984.

== Collaborators ==
Over the span of his career, Yumemakura worked with a wide range of historically important figures in the Japanese art scene.

- Yoshitaka Amano - He was in charge of stage design for Nayotake, produced by Bandō Tamasaburō V, where Amano introduced him to Baku Yumemakura. The three would also collaborate on Yang Guifei, with Baku Yumemakura writing the lyrics and Yoshitaka Amano in charge of stage design. The manga Amon Saga was written by Baku Yumemakura and illustrated by Amano and was later adapted into an OVA. Among other Baku Yumemakura's works, he also did the illustrations and cover page design for Garōden, Taitei no Ken and Yamigarishi, as well as the Kimaira series. He was key visual and costume designer for movies written by Baku Yumemakura including Onmyōji, Onmyōji 2 and Taitei no Ken. They also collaborated on the story and pottery of Yōkihi no Bansan for both a book and exhibition, in addition to ceramic work by Kano Shokoku.
- Katsuya Terada - He was in charge of the book cover and illustrations for the Kimaira series written by Baku Yumemakura, and was in charge of cover design and illustrations for Garōden, Shin Majugari, and Yamigarishi.
- Osamu Tezuka - Baku Yumemakura was influenced by one of his seminal works, Phoenix. Baku Yumemakura would go on to write the script for Saiyūki.
- Reiko Okano - She is married to Osamu Tezuka's son, Makoto Tezuka, and she drew the manga adaptation of Onmyōji, which won the Tezuka Osamu Cultural Manga Award. She went on to produce the serialized version as Onmyōji Tamatebako in the comic magazine Melody.
- Keisuke Itagaki - In 1996, he began working on Garōden, an original work by Baku Yumemakura. He has also collaborated on the series Garōden Boy.
- Ken Ishikawa - In 1994 he drew the manga Tsukumo Ranzō (九十九乱蔵) based on the Yamigarishi series, and in 1998 the manga Amon Saga - Tsuki no Miko (アーモンサーガ 月の御子) based on Baku Yumemakura's novel Tsuki no Ou.
- Jiro Taniguchi - Illustrated Baku Yumemakura's works, Garouden from 1989 to 1990 and Kamigami no itadaki (The Summit of the Gods) from 2000 to 2003. The Summit of the Gods received awards at the Angoulême International Comics Festival in 2002 and 2005.
- Yōjirō Takita - In 2001, he directed Onmyōji. It became an international hit and received a prize at The Neuchâtel International Fantastic Film Festival in 2002. He directed Onmyōji 2 in 2003.
- Yukihiko Tsutsumi - Directed Taitei no Ken, an original work by Baku Yumemakura, in 2007.
- Bandō Tamasaburō V - The dance production Yōkihi is based on the Chinese historical figure Princess Yang Guifei. Baku Yumemakura wrote the lyrics. In 1993, Baku Yumemakura wrote specially for Kabuki Sangoku denrai genjō banashi. Both of Yōkihi and Sangoku denrai genjō banashi were performed at the Kabuki-za Theater.
- Mansai Nomura - He played Abe no Seimei in Onmyōji and Onmyōji 2. He received the Best Actor prize at the Blue Ribbon Awards for his work in Onmyōji.

== Translated works ==
- 1 - (October, 2012). Demon Hunters: Desires of the Flesh

== Works in print in Japanese ==
The following works have been released in Japan.

1. (April, 1979).ねこひきのオルオラネ (Nekohiki no Oruorane)
2. (December, 1980).キラキラ星のジッタ (Kirakira Boshi no Jitta) - A Glittering Star's Jitter
3. (December, 1980).遥かなる巨神 (Harukanaru Kyojin) - The Far Off God
4. (November, 1981).幻獣変化 (Genjyu Henge)
5. (July, 1982).幻獣少年キマイラ (Genjyu Shonen Kimaira) - Boy Beast Chimera
6. (December, 1982).キマイラ朧変 (Kimaira Rouhen)
7. (September, 1983).キマイラ餓狼変 (Kimaira Garouhen)
8. (February, 1984).魔獣狩り 淫楽編 (Majugari 1) - The Demon Hunters - Psycho Diver Series Volume 1
9. (July, 1984).魔獣狩り 暗黒編 (Majugari 2) - The Demon Hunters - Psycho Diver Series Volume 2
10. (July, 1984).闇狩り師 (Yami Gari Shi) - The Leader of the Darkness Hunters
11. (July, 1984).キマイラ魔王変 (Kimaira Maouhen)
12. (October, 1984).キマイラ菩薩変 (Kimaira Bosatsuhen) - Bodhisattva Chimera
13. (October, 1984).闇狩り師2 (Yami Gari Shi 2) - The Leader of the Darkness Hunters 2
14. (October, 1984).悪夢喰らい (Akumu Kurai) - Nightmare Consumption
15. (December, 1984).魔獣狩り 鬼哭編 (Majugari 3) - The Demon Hunters - Psycho Diver Series Volume 3
16. (January, 1985).カエルの死 (Kaeru no Shi) - Frog's Death
17. (March, 1985).こころほし てんとう虫 (Kokoro Hoshi Tentomushi)
18. (May, 1985).悪夢展覧会 (Akumu Tenrankai) - Nightmare Exhibition
19. (June, 1985).魔獣館 (Makju Kan) - The Devil's House
20. (July, 1985).餓狼伝I (Garouden 1) - Legend of the Starving Wolf
21. (August, 1985).獅子の門 群狼編 (Shishi no Mon Gunrou-hen) - The Lion's Den
22. (August, 1985).半獣神 (Hanjyu Shin) - Half Beast God
23. (September, 1985).蒼獣鬼 妄霊篇 (Sei Jyu Ki Mourei-hen) - Blue Devil
24. (October, 1985).キマイラ如来変 (Kimaira Nyoraihen) - Chimera Tathagata
25. (October, 1985).獣王伝 (Jyuouden)
26. (February, 1986).魔獣狩り外伝 聖母隠陀羅編 (Majugari Gaiden, Seibo Ondara-hen)
27. (February, 1986).倒れて本望 (Taorete Honmou)
28. (March, 1986).蒼獣鬼 異神篇 (Seijyuki Ishin-hen)
29. (April, 1986).黄金宮 勃起仏編 (Ougonkyu Bokkibutsu-hen)
30. (July, 1986).ハイエナの夜 (Haiena no Yoru)
31. (August, 1986).魔性菩薩 上 (Masyou Bosatsu 1)
32. (September, 1986).魔性菩薩 下 (Mashyou Bosatsu 2)
33. (September, 1986).キマイラ涅槃変 (Kimaira Nehanhen)
34. (October, 1986).餓狼伝II (Garouden 2)
35. (November, 1986).獅子の門 玄武編 (Shishi no Mon Genbu-hen)
36. (November, 1986).大帝の剣 巻ノ壱 天魔降臨編 (Taitei no Ken Vol.1 Tenma Kourin-hen)
37. (January, 1987).魔獣狩り外伝 美空曼陀羅 (Majugari Gaiden Biku Mandara)
38. (February, 1987).風果つる街 (Kaze Hatsuru Machi)
39. (March, 1987).ガキのころから漫画まんがマンガ (Gakinokorokara Manga Manga Manga)
40. (May, 1987).岩村賢治詩集 蒼黒いけもの (Iwamura Kenji Shisyuu Aoguroi Kemono)
41. (May, 1987).妖樹・あやかしのき (Youjyu・Ayakashi no Ki)
42. (June, 1987).怪男児 (Kaidanji)
43. (July, 1987).キマイラ鳳凰変 (Kimaira Hououhen)
44. (July, 1987).新・魔獣狩り序曲 魍魎の女王 上 (Shin Majugari Jyokyoku Mouryou no Jyouou 1)
45. (August, 1987).新・魔獣狩り序曲 魍魎の女王 下 (Shin Majugari Jyokyoku Mouryou no Jyouou 2)
46. (August, 1987).場外乱闘である (Jyougai Rantou de Aru)
47. (November, 1987).歓喜月の孔雀舞 (Kankizuki no Kujyakumai)
48. (December, 1987).月に呼ばれて海より如来る (Tsuki ni Yobarete Umi yori Kitaru)
49. (December, 1987).青狼の拳 餓狼伝・秘篇 (Seirou no Ken Garouden Hihen)
50. (January, 1988).奇譚草子 (Kitan Soushi)
51. (April, 1988).餓狼伝 III (Garouden 3)
52. (April, 1988).悪夢で乾盃 (Akumu de Kanpai)
53. (April, 1988).黄金獣 上 (Ougonjyu 1)
54. (May, 1988).崑崙の王 竜の紋章篇 (Konron no Ou Ryu no Monsyou-hen)
55. (June, 1988).崑崙の王 竜の咆哮篇 (Konron no Ou Ryu no Houkou-hen)
56. (June, 1988).獅子の門 青竜編 (Shishi no Mon Seiryu-hen)
57. (July, 1988).黄金獣 下 (Ougonjyu 2)
58. (August, 1988).陰陽師 (Onmyoji)
59. (August, 1988).格闘漂流 猛き風に告げよ 私説UWF伝 (Kakutou Hyouryu Takeki Kaze ni Tsugeyo Shisetsu UWF den)
60. (October, 1988).幻花曼陀羅 (Genka Mandara)
61. (November, 1988).大帝の剣 巻ノ弐 妖魔復活編 (Taitei no Ken Vol.2 Youma Fukkatsu-hen)
62. (December, 1988).キマイラ狂仏変 (Kimaira Kyoubutsuhen)
63. (February, 1989).呪禁道士 (Jyukin Doushi)
64. (March, 1989).鮎師 (Ayu Shi)
65. (May, 1989).月の王 (Tsuki no Ou)
66. (May, 1989).光の博物誌 (Hikarino Hakubutsushi)
67. (August, 1989).上弦の月を喰べる獅子 (Jyougen no Tsuki wo Taberu Shishi)
68. (September, 1989).黄金宮2 裏密編 (Ougonkyu2 Rimitsu-hen)
69. (October, 1989).猫弾きのオルオラネ」オルオラネシリーズ (Nekohiki no Oruorane, Oruorane Series)
70. (October, 1989).餓狼伝IV (Garouden4)
71. (October, 1989).仰天・プロレス和歌集 (Gyouten Puroresu Waka Shyuu)
72. (October, 1989).仕事師たちの哀歌 (Shigotoshi Tachi no Aika)
73. (October, 1989).ブッダの方舟 (Buddha no Hakobune)
74. (November, 1989).神々の国 人の国 (Kamigami no Kuni Hito no Kuni)
75. (November, 1989).大帝の剣 巻ノ参 神魔咆哮編 (Taitei no Ken Vol.3 Jinmahoukou-hen)
76. (December, 1989).キマイラ独覚変 (Kimaira Dokkakuhen)
77. (December, 1989).只今、獏談中 (Tadaima Bakudantyuu)
78. (February, 1990).黄金宮3 仏呪編 (Ougonkyu 3 Butsujyu-hen)
79. (May, 1990).荒野に獣 慟哭す1 獣化の章 (Kouya ni Kemono Doukokusu 1 Jyuuge no Shyou)
80. (May, 1990).旅に果てたし (Tabi ni Hatetashi)
81. (December, 1990).夢枕獏 あとがき大全 (Yumemakura Baku Atogaki Taizen)
82. (January, 1991).鳥葬の山 (Chyousou no Yama)
83. (February, 1991).仰天文学大系 (Gyouten Bungaku Taikei)
84. (March, 1991).キマイラ胎蔵変 (Kimaira Taizouhen)
85. (April, 1991).牙の紋章 (Kiba no Monshyou)
86. (October, 1991).混沌の城 上 (Konton no Shiro 1)
87. (October, 1991).混沌の城 下 (Konton no Shiro 2)
88. (November, 1991).緑の迷宮 (Midori no Meikyuu)
89. (November, 1991).大帝の剣 (Taitei no Ken)
90. (December, 1991).涅槃の王 巻ノ壱 神獣変化・蛇魔編 (Nehan no Ou Vol.1 Jyuujin Henge・Jyama-hen)
91. (January, 1992).涅槃の王 巻ノ弐 神獣変化・霊水編 (Nehan no Ou Vol.2 Jyuujin Henge・Reisui-hen
92. (January, 1992).螺旋王 (Rasen Ou)
93. (March, 1992).キマイラ金剛変 (Kimaira Kongouhen)
94. (March, 1992).涅槃の王 巻ノ参 神獣変化・不老宮編 (Nehan no Ou Vo.3 Jyuujin Henge・Furoukyuu-hen)
95. (March, 1992).戦慄！業界用語辞典 (Senritsu! Gyoukai Yougo Jiten)
96. (April, 1992).黄金宮4 暴竜編 (Ougon Kyuu 4 Bouryuu-hen)
97. (May, 1992).仰天・文壇和歌集 (Gyouten・Bundan Waka Shyuu)
98. (June, 1992).夢枕獏 少女マンガ館 (Yumemmakura Baku Shyoujyo Mangakan)
99. (July, 1992).新・魔獣狩り1 鬼道編 (Shin Majugari 1 Kidou-hen)
100. (October, 1992).鬼踊りにて候ふ (Oni Odori nite Sourou)
101. (November, 1992).純情漂流 (Jyunjyou Hyouryuu)
102. (December, 1992).大帝の剣 巻ノ伍 飛騨大乱編 (Taitei no Ken Vol.5 Hida Dairan-hen)
103. (December, 1992).空手道ビジネスマンクラス練馬支部 (Karatedou Bijinesumankurasu Nerimashibu)
104. (February, 1993).餓狼伝V (Garouden 5)
105. (March, 1993).新・魔獣狩り2 孔雀編 (Shin Majugari 2 Kujyaku-hen)
106. (March, 1993).仰天・平成元年の空手チョップ (Gyouten・Heisei Gannen no Karate Chyoppu)
107. (April, 1993).聖楽堂酔夢譚 (Seirakudou Suimutan)
108. (June, 1993).荒野に獣 慟哭す2 凶獣の章 (Kouya ni Kemono Doukokusu 2 Kyoujyuu no Shou)
109. (June, 1993).生命の水の物語 (Inochi no Mizu no Monogatari)
110. (July, 1993).牙鳴り (Kiba Nari)
111. (October, 1993).地平線物語 (Chiheisen Monogatari)
112. (October, 1993).涅槃の王 巻ノ序 幻獣変化 (Nehan no Ou Kan no Jyo Genjyuhenge)
113. (March, 1994).キマイラ梵天変 (Kimaira Bontenhen)
114. (April, 1994).涅槃の王 巻ノ四 神獣変化・魔羅編 (Nehan no Ou Vol.4 Shinjyuhenge・Mara-hen)
115. (June, 1994).群狼の旗 (Gunrou no Hata)
116. (August, 1994).悦楽の旅人 (Etsuraku no Tabibito)
117. (September, 1994).西蔵回廊 (Saizou Kairou)
118. (October, 1994).夢枕獏の外道教養文庫 (Yumemakura Baku no Gedou Kyouyou Bunko)
119. (October, 1994).釣りにつられて (Tsuri ni Tsurarete)
120. (January, 1995).その日暮らしの手帖 (Sonohi Gurashi no Techou)
121. (March, 1995).餓狼伝VI (Garouden6)
122. (April, 1995).瑠璃の方船 (Ruri no Hakobune)
123. (April, 1995).絢爛たる鷺 (Kenran taru Sagi)
124. (June, 1995).陰陽師 飛天ノ巻 (Onmyoji Hiten no Maki)
125. (June, 1995).ほのかな夜の幻想譚 (Honokana Yoru no Gensoutan)
126. (July, 1995).新・魔獣狩り3 土蜘蛛編 (Shin Majugari 3 Tsuchigumo-hen)
127. (October, 1995).聖玻璃の山 (Seihari no Yama)
128. (October, 1995).奇譚カーニバル (Kitan Carnival)
129. (December, 1995).餓狼伝VII (Garouden 7)
130. (February, 1996).猫待ち月夜 その日暮らしの手帖2 (Nekomachi Tsukiyo Sonohigurashi no Techou 2)
131. (March, 1996).涅槃の王 巻ノ五 神獣変化・幻鬼編 (Nehan no Ou Vol.5 Jinjyuhenge・Genki-hen)
132. (April, 1996).涅槃の王 巻ノ結 神獣変化・覚者降臨編 (Nehan no Ou Vol.6 Jinjyuhenge・Kakushakourin-hen)
133. (April, 1996).猫弾きのオルオラネ 完全版 (Nekohiki no Oruorane Kanzenban)
134. (June, 1996).雨晴れて月は朦朧の夜 (Ameharete Tsuki ha Mourou no Yoru)
135. (June, 1996).闇狩り師 (Yami Gari Shi)
136. (July, 1996).餓狼伝VIII (Garouden 8)
137. (October, 1996).風太郎の絵 (Futaro no E)
138. (November, 1996).本朝無双格闘家列伝 (Honchyou Musou Kakutouka Retsuden)
139. (January, 1997).荒野に獣 慟哭す3 獣王の章 ((Kouya ni Kemono Doukokusu 3 Jyuou no Shyou)
140. (February, 1997).本日釣り日和 釣行大全 (Honjitsu Tsuri Biyori Tyoukoutaizen)
141. (April, 1997).餓狼伝IX (Garouden 9)
142. (June, 1997).新・魔獣狩り4 狂王編 (Shin Majugari 4 Kyouou-hen)
143. (August, 1997).ULTIMATE (ULUTIMATE)
144. (August, 1997).神々の山嶺 上 (Kamigami no Itadaki Vol.1)
145. (August, 1997).神々の山嶺 下 (Kamigami no Itadaki Vol.2)
146. (August, 1997).揺籃鬼の祭 (Youranki no Matsuri)
147. (August, 1997).釣り時どき仕事 (Tsuri Tokidoki Shigoto)
148. (October, 1997).本日も夢見ごこち (Honjitsu mo Yumemi Gokochi)
149. (November, 1997).陰陽師 付喪神ノ巻 (Onmyoji Tsukumogami no Maki)
150. (January, 1998).新・魔獣狩り5 鬼神編 (Shin Majugari 5 Kijin-hen)
151. (February, 1998).餓狼伝X (Garouden 10)
152. (February, 1998).羊の宇宙 (Hitsuji no Uchyu)
153. (March, 1998).キマイラ縁生変 (Kimaira Enseihen)
154. (April, 1998).平成講釈 安倍晴明伝 (Heisei Koushyaku Abe no Seimei Den)
155. (May, 1998).空気枕ぶく先生太平記 (Kukimakura Buku Sensei Taiheiki)
156. (August, 1998).七人の安倍晴明 (Nananin no Abe no Seimei)
157. (January, 1999).仰天・夢枕獏 特別号 (Gyouten・Yumemakura Baku Tokubetsugou)
158. (February, 1999).餓狼伝XI (Garou Den 11)
159. (April, 1999).新・魔獣狩り6 魔道編 (Shin Majugari 6 Madou-hen)
160. (October, 1999).果実の森 上の巻 文芸篇 (Kajitsu no Mori Vol.1 Bungei-hen)
161. (October, 1999).果実の森 下の巻 コミック・SF篇 (Kajitsu no Mori Vol.2 Comic・SF-hen)
162. (February, 2000).キマイラ群狼変 (Kimaira Gunrouhen)
163. (March, 2000).七人の役小角 (Nananib no En no Ozuno)
164. (April, 2000).荒野に獣 慟哭す4 鬼獣の章 (Kouya ni Kemono Doukokusu 4 Kijyu no Shyou)
165. (April, 2000).陰陽師 生成り姫 (Onmyoji Namanari Hime)
166. (May, 2000).荒野に獣 慟哭す5 完結編／獣神の章 (Kouya ni Kemono Doukokusu 5 Kanketsu-hen/Jyuujin no Shyou)
167. (June, 2000).闘人烈伝 (Toujin Retsuden)
168. (June, 2000).陰陽師 鳳凰ノ巻 (Onmyoji Houou no Maki)
169. (July, 2000).B—1ザウルスの盃 (B-1 Zaurusu no Hai)
170. (July, 2000).餓狼伝 格闘士真剣伝説 (Garou Den Kakutou Shinken Densetsu)
171. (August, 2000).黒塚 KUROZUKA (KUROZUKA)
172. (August, 2000).涅槃の王1 幻獣変化 (Nehan no Ou 1 Genjyu Henge)
173. (August, 2000).涅槃の王2 神獣変化 蛇魔編 霊水編 (Nehan no Ou 2 Shinjyu Henge Jyama-hen Reisui-hen)
174. (September, 2000).涅槃の王3 神獣変化 不老宮編 魔羅編 (Nehan no Ou 3 Shinjyu Henge FUroukyuu-hen Mara-hen)
175. (October, 2000).夢の狩人 the sandman (Yume no Karyuudo the sandman)
176. (October, 2000).腐りゆく天使 (Kusariyuku Tenshi)
177. (December, 2000).涅槃の王4 神獣変化 幻鬼編 覚者降臨編 (Nehan no Ou 4 Shinjyu Henge Genki-hen Kakushyakourin-hen)
178. (December, 2000).キマイラI 幻獣少年 朧変 (Kimaira 1 Genjyu Shyounen Oborohen)
179. (January, 2001).キマイラII 餓狼変 魔王変 (Kimaira 2 Garouhen Maouhen)
180. (February, 2001).怪しの世界 (Ayashi no Sekai)
181. (March, 2001).キマイラIII 菩薩変 如来変 (Kimaira 3 Bosatsu-hen Nyorai-hen)
182. (March, 2001).餓狼伝XII (Garou Den 12)
183. (May, 2001).キマイラIV 涅槃変 鳳凰変 (Kimaira 4 Nehanhen Hououhen)
184. (May, 2001).餓狼伝 最強格闘技作法 (Garou Den Saikyou Kakutougi Sahou)
185. (June, 2001).新・魔獣狩り7 鬼門編 (Shin Majugari 7 Kimon-hen)
186. (July, 2001).キマイラV 狂仏変 独覚変 (Kimaira 5 Kyoubutsuhen Dokkakuhen)
187. (August, 2001).ものいふ髑髏 (Monoiu Gaikotsu)
188. (August, 2001).鬼譚草紙 (Kitan Zoushi)
189. (September, 2001).キマイラVI 胎蔵変 金剛変 (Kimaira 6 Taizouhen Kongouhen)
190. (September, 2001).陰陽夜話 (Onmyo Yawa)
191. (October, 2001).陰陽師 瘤取り晴明 (Onmyoji Kobutori Seimei)
192. (November, 2001).陶素人 (Toushirou)
193. (November, 2001).キマイラVII 梵天変 縁生変 (Kimaira 7 Bontenhen Enshyouhen)
194. (December, 2001).闇狩り師0 公式読本 (Yami Gari Shi 0 Koushiki Dokuhon)
195. (February, 2002).陰陽師 龍笛ノ巻 (Onmyoji Ryuuteki no Maki)
196. (March, 2002).獅子の門 朱雀編 (Shishi no Mon Sujyaku-hen)
197. (March, 2002).キマイラ昇月変 (Kimaira Shyougetsu hen)
198. (September, 2002).キマイラVIII 群狼変 昇月変 (Kimaira 7 Gunrouhen Shyougetsuhen)
199. (November, 2002).大帝の剣1 天魔の章 天魔降臨編／妖魔復活編 (Taitei no Ken Tenma no Shyou Tenma Kourin-hen/Youma Fukkatsu-hen)
200. (November, 2002).大帝の剣2 天魔の章 神魔咆哮編／凶魔襲来編 (Taitei no Ken 2 Tenma no Shyou Jinma Houkou-hen/Kyouma Shyuurai-hen)
201. (March, 2003).餓狼伝XIII (Garou Den 13)
202. (April, 2003).陰陽師 太極ノ巻 (Onmyoji Taikyoku no Maki)
203. (April, 2003).荒野に獣 慟哭す 完全版 (Kouyani Kemono Doukokusu Kanzenban)
204. (May, 2003).新・魔獣狩り8 憂艮編 (Shin Majugari 8 Ushitora-hen)
205. (August, 2003).摩多羅神の贄 (Matarajin no Nie)
206. (September, 2003).陰陽師読本 (Onmyoji Dokuhon)
207. (October, 2003).陰陽師 首 (Onmyoji Kubi)
208. (February, 2004).餓狼伝 BOY スーパーガイド (Garou Den BOY Super Guide)
209. (April, 2004).獅子の門 白虎編 (Shishi no Mon Byakko-hen)
210. (April, 2004).空海曼陀羅 (Kukai Mandara)
211. (July, 2004).沙門空海唐の国にて鬼と宴す 巻ノ一 (Samon Kukai Tou no Kuni nite Oni to Utagesu Vol.1)
212. (July, 2004).沙門空海唐の国にて鬼と宴す 巻ノ二 (Samon Kukai Tou no Kuni nite Oni to Utagesu Vol.2)
213. (July, 2004).魔獣狩り 新装版 (Majugari New edition)
214. (August, 2004).沙門空海唐の国にて鬼と宴す 巻ノ三 (Samon Kukai Tou no Kuni nite Oni to Utagesu Vol.3)
215. (September, 2004).沙門空海唐の国にて鬼と宴す 巻ノ四 (Samon Kukai Tou no Kuni nite Oni to Utagesu Vol.4)
216. (September, 2004).達人が選ぶ 女性のための まんが文庫100 (Tatsujin ga Erabu Jyosei no Tame no Manga Bunko)
217. (November, 2004).シナン 上 (Shinan Vol.1)
218. (November, 2004).シナン 下 (Shinan Vol.2)
219. (November, 2004).新・魔獣狩り9 狂龍編 (Shin Majugari 9 Kyouryuu-hen)
220. (April, 2005).日本SF・名作集成 (Nihon SF Meisaku Shyuusei)
221. (June, 2005).陰陽師 鉄輪 (Onmyoji Kanawa)
222. (August, 2005).知るを楽しむ この人この世界 夢枕獏の奇想家列伝 (Shiru wo Tanoshimu Konohito Konosekai Yumemakura Baku no Kisouka Retsuden)
223. (September, 2005).陰陽師 瀧夜叉姫 上 (Onmyoji Takiyashyahime Vol.1)
224. (September, 2005).陰陽師 瀧夜叉姫 下 (Onmyoji Takiyashyahime Vol.2)
225. (December, 2005).餓狼伝 Breakblow 完全格闘指南 (Garou Den Breakblow Kanzen Kakutou Shinan)
226. (January, 2006).楽語・すばる寄席 (Rakugo Subaru Yose)
227. (February, 2006).キマイラ青龍変 (Kimaira Seiryuuhen)
228. (March, 2006).獅子の門 雲竜編 (Shishi no Mon Unryuu-hen)
229. (April, 2006).熱い幻想 夢枕獏全仕事 (Atsui Gensou Yumemakura Baku Zenshigoto)
230. (April, 2006).はりま 陰陽師紀行 (Harima Onmyoji Kikou)
231. (May, 2006).楊貴妃 (Youkihi)
232. (June, 2006).新・魔獣狩り10 空海編 (Shin Majugari 10 Kukai-hen)
233. (November, 2006).格闘的日常生活 (Kakutouteki Nichijyou Seikatsu)
234. (November, 2006).新装 餓狼伝 the Bound Volume 1 (Shinsou Garou Den the Bound Volume 1)
235. (November, 2006).新装 餓狼伝 the Bound Volume 2 (Shinsou Garou Den the Bound Volume 2)
236. (November, 2006).琵琶綺談 (Biwa Kidan)
237. (December, 2006).新・餓狼伝 巻ノ一 秘伝菊式編 (Shin Garou Den Vol.1 Hiden Kikushiki-hen)
238. (December, 2006).新装 餓狼伝 the Bound Volume 3 (Shinsou Garou Den the Bound Volume 3)
239. (December, 2006).新装 餓狼伝 the Bound Volume 4 (Shinsou Garou Den the Bound Volume 4)
240. (February, 2007).大帝の剣 1 天魔降臨編・妖魔復活編 (Taitei no Ken 1 Tenma Kourin-hen・Youma Fukkatsu-hen)
241. (March, 2007).大帝の剣 2 神魔咆哮編・凶魔襲来編 (Taitei no Ken 2 Jinma Houkou-hen・Kyouma Shyuurai-hen)
242. (April, 2007).大帝の剣 3 飛騨大乱編・天魔望郷編 (Taitei no Ken 3 Hida Dairan-hen・Tenma Boukyou-hen)
243. (April, 2007).映画 大帝の剣 公式ガイドブック (Eiga Taitei no Ken Koushiki Guide book)
244. (June, 2007).陰陽師 夜光杯ノ巻 (Onmyoji Yakouhai no Maki)
245. (June, 2007).続・格闘的日常生活 (Zoku Kakutouteki Nichijyou Seikatsu)
246. (July, 2007).あめん法師 (Amen Houshi)
247. (September, 2007).蘊蓄好きのための格闘噺 (Unchiku Zuki no Tame no Kakutoubanashi)
248. (February, 2008).獏さんのぽちぶくろ (Bakusan no Pochi Bukuro)
249. (May, 2008).毎日釣り日和 (Mainichi Tsuri Biyori)
250. (September, 2008).新・魔獣狩り11 地龍編 (Shin Majugari 11 Chiryuu-hen)
251. (October, 2008).東天の獅子 第一巻 天の巻・嘉納流柔術 (Touten no Shishi Vol.1 Ten no Maki・Kanouryuu Jyuujyutsu)
252. (October, 2008).東天の獅子 第二巻 天の巻・嘉納流柔術 (Touten no Shishi Vol.2 Ten no Maki・Kanouryuu Jyuujyutsu)
253. (November, 2008).東天の獅子 第三巻 天の巻・嘉納流柔術 (Touten no Shishi Vol.3 Ten no Maki・Kanouryuu Jyuujyutsu)
254. (November, 2008).愚か者の杖 五大陸釣魚紀行 (Orokamono no Tsue Gotairiku Tyougyo Kikou)
255. (December, 2008).東天の獅子 第四巻 天の巻・嘉納流柔術 (Touten no Shishi Vol.4 Ten no Maki・Kanouryuu Jyuujyutsu)
256. (June, 2009).闇狩り師 黄石公の犬 (Yami Gari Shi Ousekikou no Inu)
257. (September, 2009).闇狩り師 〈新装版〉 (Yami Gari Shi <Shinsou Ban>)
258. (August, 2009).闇狩り師 蒼獣鬼〈新装版〉 (Yami Gari Shi Seijyuuki <Shinsou ban>)
259. (September, 2009).闇狩り師 崑崙の王〈新装版〉 (Yami Gari Shi Konron no Ou <Shinsou Ban>)
260. (January, 2010).陰陽師 天鼓ノ巻 (Onmyoji Tenko no Maki)
261. (February, 2010).沙門空海 唐の国にて鬼と宴す 巻ノ一 (Samon Kukai Tou no Kuni nite Oni to Utagesu Vol.1)
262. (February, 2010).沙門空海 唐の国にて鬼と宴す 巻ノ二 (Samon Kukai Tou no Kuni nite Oni to Utagesu Vol.2)
263. (March, 2010).沙門空海 唐の国にて鬼と宴す 巻ノ三 (Samon Kukai Tou no Kuni nite Oni to Utagesu Vol.3)
264. (March, 2010).沙門空海 唐の国にて鬼と宴す 巻ノ四 (Samon Kukai Tou no Kuni nite Oni to Utagesu Vol.4)
265. (March, 2010).獅子の門7 人狼編 (Shishi no Mon 7 Jinrou-hen)
266. (April, 2010).月神祭 (Gesshinsai)
267. (April, 2010).楊貴妃の晩餐 (Youkihi no Bansan)
268. (July, 2010).魔獣狩り 新装版 (Majugari New Edition)
269. (July, 2010).天海の秘宝 上 (Tenkai no Hihou Vol.1)
270. (July, 2010).天海の秘宝 下 (Tenkai no Hihou Vol.2)
271. (July, 2010).魔獣狩り 外伝 (Majugari Gaiden)
272. (August, 2010).投竿翁遊々日記 (Toukan Ou YuuYuu Nikki)
273. (August, 2010).キマイラ 9 玄象変 (Kimaira 9 Genjyouhen)
274. (September, 2010).新・魔獣狩り 序曲 (Shin Majugari Jyokyoku)
275. (November, 2010).新・魔獣狩り 完結編 倭王の城 上巻 (Shin Majugari Kanketsu-hen Waou no Shiro Vol.1)
276. (November, 2010).新・魔獣狩り 完結編 倭王の城 下巻 (Shin Majugari Kanketsu-hen Waou no Shiro Vol.2)
277. (May, 2011).陰陽師 醍醐ノ巻 (Onmyoji Daigo no Maki)
278. (July, 2011).大江戸釣客伝 上巻 (Oyedo Chokakuden Vol.1)
279. (July, 2011).大江戸釣客伝 下巻 ((Oyedo Chokakuden Vol.2)
280. (December, 2011).翁 OKINA (Okina)
281. (April, 2012).呼ぶ山 (Yobu Yama)
282. (June, 2012).大帝の剣4 幻魔落涙編 (Taitei no Ken 4 Genma Rakurui-hen)
283. (June, 2012).大帝の剣5 幻魔落涙編 (Taitei no Ken 5 Genma Rakurui-hen)
