= Space Groove =

Studio album by ProjeKct Two
- Released: April 7, 1998
- Recorded: November 19–21, 1997
- Studio: Studio Belewbeloible (Nashville, Tennessee)
- Genre: Experimental rock, free improvisation
- Length: 90:28
- Label: Discipline Global Mobile
- Producer: ProjeKct Two

ProjeKct Two chronology
Space Groove (1998)	Live Groove (1999)

Professional ratings
Review scores
Source	Rating
AllMusic	3/5 stars

Space Groove is the only studio album by ProjeKct Two, a spin-off group of King Crimson. The album contains fully improvised music recorded at member Adrian Belew's studio in Nashville, Tennessee, in November 1997.

== Track listing ==
All tracks are written by ProjeKct Two (Robert Fripp, Trey Gunn, and Adrian Belew).

Volume One: Space Groove
No.	Title	Length
1.	"Space Groove II"	19:03
2.	"Space Groove III"	2:40
3.	"Space Groove I"	17:13
Total length:		38:56

Volume Two: Vector Patrol
No.	Title	Length
1.	"The Planet Zarg Quartet: "1. Happy Hour on Planet Zarg"; "2. Is There Life on Zarg?"; "3. Low Life in Sector Q-3"; "4. Sector Shift"; "5. Laura in Space"; "6. Sector Drift"; "7. Sector Patrol""	17:30: 4:56; 2:25; 1:32; 0:45; 3:17; 0:54; 3:41
2.	"Lost in Space: "1. In Space There Is No North, in Space There Is No South, in Space There Is No East, in Space There Is No West"; "2. Vector Patrol"; "3. Deserts of Arcadia (North)"; "4. Deserts of Arcadia (South)"; "5. Snake Drummers of Sector Q-3"; "6. Escape from Sagittarius A""	30:59: 2:52; 3:41; 8:57; 4:10; 0:26; 10:53
3.	"Return to Station B"	3:03
Total length:		51:32

== Personnel ==
ProjeKct Two

- Robert Fripp – electric guitar
- Trey Gunn – Warr Guitar, synthesizer
- Adrian Belew – Roland V-Drums

Production personnel

- Ken Latchney – engineer
- John Sinks – assistant engineer
- Adrian Belew, Robert Fripp, Trey Gunn – mixing
- David Singleton, Robert Fripp – editing
- John Miller – cover art
- Hugh O'Donnell – design
