= Live at the Jazz Café =

Live album by ProjeKct One
- Released: 1998
- Recorded: December 1–4, 1997
- Venue: The Jazz Café, London, England
- Genre: Jazz rock, free improvisation
- Length: 50:17
- Label: Discipline Global Mobile
- Producer: ProjeKct One

Professional ratings
Review scores
Source	Rating
Allmusic	3/5 stars

Live at the Jazz Café is a 1998 live album by ProjeKct One, an experimental sub-group of the band King Crimson. Originally released only in Japan, it was later included as part of the 1999 box set The ProjeKcts.

== Overview ==
The album was compiled from four nights of group improvisation at The Jazz Café in Camden Town, London, December 1 to 4, 1997. The same sessions provided the material for the later Jazz Café Suite album.

== Track listing ==
The naming scheme is "night, set, piece"

1. "4 i 1" – 6:11
2. "4 ii 1" – 3:29
3. "1 ii 2" – 4:27
4. "4 ii 4" – 7:28
5. "2 ii 3" – 4:27
6. "3 i 2" – 8:14
7. "3 ii 2" – 6:32
8. "2 ii 4" – 4:27
9. "4 i 3" – 4:32

All music by Fripp, Gunn, Levin & Bruford

== Personnel ==
ProjeKct One

- Robert Fripp – electric guitar
- Trey Gunn – Warr Guitar
- Tony Levin – bass guitar, electric upright bass, Chapman Stick, bass synthesizer
- Bill Bruford – acoustic drums, percussion

Production personnel

- David Singleton – recording engineer, mixing, mastering
- Alex R. Mundy – assistant engineer
- Ronan Chris Murphy – mixing on tracks 3 and 5
- Bill Bruford – mix consultant
- P.J. Crook – cover art
- Hugh O'Donnell – design
