= London, Jazz Café, England – December 4, 1997 =

London, Jazz Café, England - December 4, 1997

Live album by ProjeKct One
- Released: 2005
- Recorded: December 4, 1997
- Genre: Jazz rock, free improvisation
- Label: Discipline Global Mobile
- Producer: David Singleton and Alex R. Mundy

London, Jazz Café, England – December 4, 1997 is a live album by ProjeKct One, one of the four sub-groups known as ProjeKcts into which the band King Crimson 'fraKctalised' from 1997 to 1999. The album was released as a download on DGM Live in 2005 and is organized into two sets designed to fit on two CDs. In 2006, seven minutes of additional audio was discovered by DGM and the complete set replaced the former version. This version was made available free of charge to purchasers of the previous edition. The cover art is available for download in the form of a PDF file and the music is available in the MP3 and FLAC formats.

The album was recorded at The Jazz Café in Camden Town, London, United Kingdom on December 4, 1997. All of the tracks featured on this album consist of group improvisations. This performance marked the final appearance of Bill Bruford playing live with members of King Crimson.

== Track listing ==
All music by Fripp, Gunn, Levin & Bruford

=== Disc 1 ===
1. 4 i 1 – 6.32
2. 4 i 2 – 6.58
3. 4 i 3 – 10.42
4. 4 i 4 – 10.58
5. 4 i 5 – 7.09
6. 4 i 6 – 4.15

=== Disc 2 ===
1. Interrupted Announcement - 1.33
2. 4 ii 1 – 7.03
3. 4 ii 2 – 8.09
4. 4 ii 3 – 2.43
5. 4 ii 4 – 8.41
6. 4 ii 5 – 7.00
7. 4 ii 6 – 10.24

== Personnel ==
- Robert Fripp – electric guitar
- Trey Gunn – Warr guitar
- Tony Levin – bass guitar, electric upright bass, Chapman stick, bass synthesizer
- Bill Bruford – acoustic drums, percussion
