= The Deception of the Thrush: A Beginners' Guide to ProjeKcts =

The Deception of the Thrush: A Beginner's Guide to ProjeKcts

Compilation album by King Crimson
- Released: 1999
- Recorded: 1997–1999
- Venue: Various
- Genre: Experimental rock, free improvisation, electronica
- Length: 73:31
- Label: Discipline Global Mobile
- Producer: Robert Fripp and David Singleton

King Crimson chronology
The ProjeKcts (1999)	The Deception of the Thrush: A Beginner's Guide to ProjeKcts (1999)	A Beginners' Guide to the King Crimson Collectors' Club (2000)

Professional ratings
Review scores
Source	Rating
Allmusic	4/5 stars

The Deception of the Thrush: A Beginners' Guide to ProjeKcts is a compilation album by the English progressive rock band King Crimson released in 1999. It contains a selection of tracks from the live box set The ProjeKcts.

From 1997 to 1999, King Crimson "fraKctalised", or forked, into four successive experimental sub-groups, dubbed ProjeKct One, Two, Three and Four, with the aim of finding new directions and material. All of them included Robert Fripp on guitar and Trey Gunn on Warr guitar, alongside one of the band's drummers and, in ProjeKcts One and Four, Tony Levin on bass and Chapman Stick. The music was mostly improvised at first, but themes emerged which were then developed by further improvisation in successive iterations. Many of these ideas were then put towards the next King Crimson studio album, The ConstruKction of Light.

== Track listing ==
1. "Masque 1" (P3) – 5:31
2. "Masque 2" (P3) – 1:44
3. "Masque 3" (P3) – 5:22
4. "Masque 4" (P3) – 3:10
5. "Masque 5" (P3) – 4:33
6. "Masque 6" (P3) – 2:40
7. "Masque 7" (P3) – 6:19
8. "4 i 1" (P1) – 5:55
9. "2 ii 3" (P1) – 3:09
10. "4 ii 4" (P1) – 5:37
11. "Sus-tayn-Z" (P2) – 6:52
12. "The Deception of the Thrush" (P3/P4) – 8:09
13. "Ghost (Part 1)" (P4) – 8:02
14. "Ghost (Part 2)" (P4) – 6:28

== Personnel ==
King Crimson

- Adrian Belew – Roland V-Drums (P2)
- Robert Fripp – electric guitar (P1, P2, P3, P4)
- Trey Gunn – Warr guitar, talker (P1, P2, P3, P4)
- Tony Levin – bass guitar, electric upright bass, Chapman Stick, bass synthesizer (P1, P4)
- Bill Bruford – acoustic drums and percussion (P1)
- Pat Mastelotto – electronic drums and percussion (P3, P4)

Production personnel

- David Singleton – recording, editing, mixing, mastering
- Alex R. Mundy – assistant engineer, editing
- Ken Latchney – recording, photography
- John Sinks – recording, photography
- Ronan Chris Murphy – mixing
- Bill Bruford – mixing
- Pat Mastelotto – editing, mixing
- Bill Munyon – mixing
- Max Mitchell – mixing
- P.J. Crook – cover art
- Hugh O'Donnell – design
