= Heavy ConstruKction =

Live album by King Crimson
- Released: 1 December 2000
- Recorded: May – July 2000
- Genre: Progressive rock
- Length: 184:17
- Label: Discipline Global Mobile
- Producers: David Singleton & Alex R. Mundy (Discs 1 & 2); Pat Mastelotto & Bill Munyon (Disc 3)

King Crimson chronology
The ConstruKction of Light (2000)	Heavy ConstruKction (2000)	Vrooom Vrooom (2001)

Professional ratings
Review scores
Source	Rating
AllMusic	3/5 stars

Heavy ConstruKction is a live three CD set by the English progressive rock band King Crimson, released by Discipline Global Mobile records on 1 December 2000. The album features recordings of the European tour of May to July 2000, from DATs made at the front-of-house mixing desk.

King Crimson's 2000 European tour was conducted to promote the studio album The Construkction of Light. The band members at the time of the tour were the "double duo" quartet of guitarists Robert Fripp and Adrian Belew, Warr guitarist Trey Gunn and drummer Pat Mastelotto. Longtime drummer Bill Bruford had left the group in 1997, and bassist Tony Levin was not included in this particular King Crimson lineup due to other musical commitments.

The third disc features improvisations from different shows, which are often spliced together to create, according to the liner notes, "a cohesive presentation out of a series of incoherent events".

- Disc 2 of the album contained video footage, playable with Windows Media Player software. A password was required to access this video footage.

== Track listing ==
=== Disc 1 ===
1. "Into the Frying Pan" (Belew, Fripp, Gunn, Mastelotto) – 6:20
  Recorded at: Circus Krone, Munich, Germany, 4 June 2000
2. "The Construkction of Light" (Belew, Fripp, Gunn, Mastelotto) – 8:29
  Recorded at: Museumsplatz, Bonn, Germany, 6 June 2000
3. "Prozakc Blues" (Belew, Fripp, Gunn, Mastelotto) – 5:25
  Recorded at: Olympia, Paris, France, 25 June 2000
4. "München" (Belew, Fripp, Gunn, Mastelotto) – 8:35
  Recorded at: Circus Krone, Munich, Germany, 4 June 2000
5. "One Time" (Belew, Fripp, Gunn, Levin, Bruford, Mastelotto) – 5:44
  Recorded at: Roma, Warsaw, Poland, 11 June 2000
6. "Dinosaur" (Belew, Fripp, Gunn, Levin, Bruford, Mastelotto) – 5:24
  Recorded at: Roma, Warsaw, Poland, 11 June 2000
7. "VROOOM" (Belew, Fripp, Gunn, Levin, Bruford, Mastelotto) – 4:44
  Recorded at: Arena, Poznań, Poland, 9 June 2000
8. "Frakctured" (Belew, Fripp, Gunn, Mastelotto) – 8:46
  Recorded at:
  Amager Bio, Copenhagen, Denmark, 28 May 2000
  Museumsplatz, Bonn, Germany, 6 June 2000
9. "The World's My Oyster Soup Kitchen Floor Wax Museum" (Belew, Fripp, Gunn, Mastelotto) – 7:38
  Recorded at: Museumsplatz, Bonn, Germany, 6 June 2000
10. "Bonn" (Belew, Fripp, Gunn, Mastelotto) – 9:22
  Recorded at: Museumsplatz, Bonn, Germany, 6 June 2000

=== Disc 2 ===
Audio

1. "Sex Sleep Eat Drink Dream" (Belew, Fripp, Gunn, Levin, Bruford, Mastelotto) – 4:30
  Recorded at: Zeleste, Barcelona, Spain, 27 June 2000
2. "Offenbach" (Belew, Fripp, Gunn, Mastelotto) – 6:30
  Recorded at Stadthalle, Offenbach, Germany, 7 June 2000
3. "Cage" (Belew, Fripp, Gunn, Levin, Bruford, Mastelotto) – 3:54
  Recorded at: Stadthalle, Offenbach, Germany, 7 June 2000
4. "Larks' Tongues in Aspic (Part IV)" (Belew, Fripp, Gunn, Mastelotto) – 12:51
  Recorded at: Olympia, Paris, France, 25 June 2000
5. "Three of a Perfect Pair" (Belew, Fripp, Levin, Bruford) – 3:42
  Recorded at: L'Ampiteatro, Gardone Riviera, Italy, 21 June 2000
6. "The Deception of the Thrush" (Fripp, Gunn, Belew) – 8:26
  Recorded at: Shepherds Bush Empire, London, UK, 3 July 2000
7. "'Heroes'" (Bowie, Eno) – 6:11
  Recorded at: Roma, Warsaw, Poland, 11 June 2000

Video

Recorded at the Città della Musica, Rome, Italy, 23 June 2000

1. "Rome" (Belew, Fripp, Gunn, Mastelotto)
2. "Larks' Tongues in Aspic (Part IV)" (Belew, Fripp, Gunn, Mastelotto)
3. "Cage" (Belew, Fripp, Gunn, Levin, Bruford, Mastelotto)
4. "The World's My Oyster Soup Kitchen Floor Wax Museum" (Belew, Fripp, Gunn, Mastelotto)
5. "Sex Sleep Eat Drink Dream" (Belew, Fripp, Gunn, Levin, Bruford, Mastelotto)
6. "VROOOM" (Belew, Fripp, Gunn, Levin, Bruford, Mastelotto)

=== Disc 3 ===
1. "Sapir" (Belew, Fripp, Gunn, Mastelotto) – 5:40
  Recorded at:
  Olympia, Paris, France, 25 June 2000
  Shepherds Bush Empire, London, UK, 3 July 2000
2. "Blastic Rhino" (Belew, Fripp, Gunn, Mastelotto) – 4:11
  Recorded at:
  Museumsplatz, Bonn, Germany, 6 June 2000
  Archa Theatre, Prague, Czech Republic, 13 June 2000
  L'Ampiteatro, Gardone Riviera, Italy, 21 June 2000
  La Riviera, Madrid, Spain, 29 June 2000
3. "Lights Please (Part I)" (Belew, Fripp, Gunn, Mastelotto) – 0:58
  Recorded at:
  Archa Theatre, Prague, Czech Republic, 13 June 2000
4. "ccccSeizurecc" (Belew, Fripp, Gunn, Mastelotto) – 6:02
  Recorded at:
  Stuttgart, Germany, 3 June 2000
  Circus Krone, Munich, Germany, 4 June 2000
  Arena, Poznań, Poland, 9 June 2000
  Piazza Cima, Conegliano Veneto, Italy, 20 June 2000
  Citta Della Musica, Rome, Italy, 23 June 2000
  Shepherds Bush Empire, London, UK, 3 July 2000
5. "Off and Back" (Belew, Fripp, Gunn, Mastelotto) – 4:11
  Recorded at:
  Stadthalle, Offenbach, Germany, 7 June 2000
6. "More (and Less)" (Belew, Fripp, Gunn, Mastelotto) – 3:14
  Recorded at:
  Citta Della Musica, Rome, Italy, 23 June 2000
  Zeleste, Barcelona, Spain, 27 June 2000
7. "Beautiful Rainbow" (Belew, Fripp, Gunn, Mastelotto) – 6:59
  Recorded at:
  Kursaal Palace, San Sebastián, Spain, 28 June 2000
8. "7 Teas" (Belew, Fripp, Gunn, Mastelotto) – 4:07
  Recorded at:
  Amager Bio, Copenhagen, Denmark, [27?/28?] May 2000
  Circus Krone, Munich, Germany, 4 June 2000
9. "Tomorrow Never Knew Thela" (Belew, Fripp, Gunn, Mastelotto) – 4:49
  including:
  - "Tomorrow Never Knows" (Lennon, McCartney)
  Recorded at:
  Roma, Warsaw, Poland, 10 June 2000
  Archa Theatre, Prague, Czech Republic, 13 June 2000
10. "Uböö" (Belew, Fripp, Gunn, Mastelotto) – 7:59
  Recorded at:
  La Riviera, Madrid, Spain, 29 June 2000
  Shepherds Bush Empire, London, UK, 3 July 2000
11. "The Deception of the Thrush" (Belew, Fripp, Gunn) – 11:10
  Recorded at:
  Columbia Halle, Berlin, Germany, 31 May 2000
  Citta Della Musica, Rome, Italy, 23 June 2000
  Olympia, Paris, France, 25 June 2000
  Teatro Kursaal, San Sebastián, Spain, 28 June 2000
12. "Arena of Terror" (Belew, Fripp, Gunn, Mastelotto) – 3:24
  Recorded at: Arena, Poznań, Poland, 9 June 2000
13. "Lights Please (Part II)" (Belew, Fripp, Gunn, Mastelotto) – 4:55
  Recorded at:
  Archa Theatre, Prague, Czech Republic, 13 June 2000
  La Riviera, Madrid, Spain, 29 June 2000

== Personnel ==
King Crimson

- Adrian Belew – guitar, vocals
- Robert Fripp – guitar
- Trey Gunn – Warr Guitar, Ashbory bass guitar, talker
- Pat Mastelotto – electronic drums

Production personnel

- George Glossop – live mixing and recording engineer (Discs 1 & 2)
- Ken Latchney – recording engineer (Disc 3)
- Pat Mastelotto and Bill Munyon – mixing (Disc 3)
- David Singleton – mastering
- P.J. Crook – cover artwork
- Bootleg TV – filming, photography
- Michael Wilson – photography
- Trey Gunn – photography
- Hugh O'Donnell – design
