= The ProjeKcts =

Box set by King Crimson
- Released: 26 October 1999
- Recorded: 1-4 December 1997 (P1); 20 February - 8 July 1998 (P2); 23 October - 2 November 1998 (P4); 21-25 March 1999 (P3)
- Venue: Various
- Genre: Experimental rock, free improvisation, electronica
- Length: 3 hrs 46 min
- Label: Discipline Global Mobile
- Producer: The ProjeKcts, David Singleton & Alex R. Mundy

King Crimson chronology
Live in Mexico City (1999)	The ProjeKcts (1999)	The Deception of the Thrush: A Beginners' Guide to ProjeKcts (1999)

Professional ratings
Review scores
Source	Rating
AllMusic	3/5 stars

The ProjeKcts is a 1999 box set of four live albums recorded between December 1997 and March 1999 by the four experimental sub-groups of the English progressive rock band King Crimson known as the ProjeKcts.

== Overview ==
Live at the Jazz Cafe
Review scores
Source	Rating
AllMusic	3/5 stars

Masque
Review scores
Source	Rating
AllMusic	3.5/5 stars

From 1997 to 1999, King Crimson 'fraKctalised', or forked, into four successive experimental sub-groups, dubbed ProjeKct One, Two, Three and Four, with the aim of finding new directions and material. All of them included Robert Fripp on guitar and Trey Gunn on Warr guitar, alongside one of the band's drummers and, in ProjeKcts One and Four, Tony Levin on bass and Chapman Stick. The music was mostly improvised at first, but themes emerged which were then developed by further improvisation in successive iterations. Many of these ideas were then put towards the next two King Crimson studio albums, The ConstruKction of Light and The Power to Believe. This box set contains a live album from each of the four bands.

== Track listing ==
Disc 1: (1997 concerts) ProjeKct One - Live At The Jazz Café
No.	Title	Length
1.	"4 i 1"	6:11
2.	"4 ii 1"	3:29
3.	"1 ii 4"	4:27
4.	"4 ii 4"	7:58
5.	"2 i 4"	4:27
6.	"3 i 2"	8:14
7.	"3 ii 4"	6:32
8.	"2 ii 4"	4:27
9.	"4 i 4"	4:32
Total length:		50:17

Disc 2: (1998 concerts) ProjeKct Two - Live Groove
No.	Title	Length
1.	"Sus-tayn-Z"	8:05
2.	"Heavy ConstruKction"	5:11
3.	"The Deception of the Thrush"	7:33
4.	"X-chayn-jiZ"	6:01
5.	"Light ConstruKction"	5:17
6.	"Vector Shift to Planet Detroit"	3:41
7.	"Contrary ConstruKction"	4:55
8.	"Live Groove"	10:50
9.	"Vector Shift to Planet Belewbeloid"	1:24
10.	"21st Century Schizoid Man"	11:52
Total length:		1:04:49

Disc 3: (1999 concerts) ProjeKct Three - Masque
No.	Title	Length
1.	"Masque 1"	5:40
2.	"Masque 2"	3:13
3.	"Masque 3"	6:17
4.	"Masque 4"	3:10
5.	"Masque 5"	3:19
6.	"Masque 6"	0:45
7.	"Masque 7"	3:21
8.	"Masque 8"	4:26
9.	"Masque 9"	2:40
10.	"Masque 10"	6:11
11.	"Masque 11"	6:24
12.	"Masque 12"	3:51
13.	"Masque 13"	5:08
Total length:		54:25

Disc 4: (1998 concerts) ProjeKct Four - West Coast Live
No.	Title	Length
1.	"Ghost (Part 1)"	9:14
2.	"Ghost (Part 1)"	4:07
3.	"Ghost (Part 1)"	5:55
4.	"Ghost (Part 1)"	5:06
5.	"The Deception of the Thrush"	7:12
6.	"Hindu Fizz"	4:46
7.	"ProjeKction"	5:29
8.	"Ghost (Part 2)"	1:39
9.	"Ghost (Part 2)"	2:43
10.	"Ghost (Part 2)"	3:53
11.	"Ghost (Part 2)"	1:48
12.	"Ghost (Part 2)"	4:57
Total length:		56:49

== Personnel ==
King Crimson

- Adrian Belew – Roland V-Drums (P2)
- Robert Fripp – electric guitar (P1, P2, P3, P4)
- Trey Gunn – Warr guitar, talker (P1, P2, P3, P4)
- Tony Levin – bass guitar, electric upright bass, Chapman Stick, bass synthesizer (P1, P4)
- Bill Bruford – acoustic drums and percussion (P1)
- Pat Mastelotto – electronic drums and percussion (P3, P4)

Production personnel

- David Singleton – recording, editing, mixing, mastering
- Alex R. Mundy – assistant engineer, editing
- Ken Latchney – recording, photography
- John Sinks – recording, photography
- Ronan Chris Murphy – mixing
- Bill Bruford – mixing
- Pat Mastelotto – editing, mixing
- Bill Munyon – mixing
- Max Mitchell – mixing
- P.J. Crook – cover art
- John Miller – cover art (Live Groove)
- Hugh O'Donnell – design
