= The Power to Believe Tour Box =

The Power To Believe Tour Box

Compilation album by King Crimson
- Released: February 28th, 2003
- Genre: Progressive rock
- Length: 64:56
- Label: Discipline Global Mobile
- Producers: Robert Fripp and David Singleton

King Crimson chronology
EleKtrik: Live in Japan (2003)	The Power To Believe Tour Box (2003)	The 21st Century Guide to King Crimson – Volume One – 1969–1974 (2004)

The Power To Believe Tour Box is an interview and outtakes compilation album by the English progressive rock band King Crimson. It is packaged in a DVD snapcase and includes a 20-page booklet with photographs, equipment lists and extra notes regarding the albums and tours. It was initially available only from the merchandise booth on their 2003 tour dates.

== Track listing ==
1. Sushi on Sunset - Press Conference (I) (2:46)
2. Sushi on Sunset - Press Conference (II) (4:12)
3. Sushi on Sunset - Press Conference (III) (3:27)
4. Sushi on Sunset - Press Conference (IV) (1:52)
5. Sushi on Sunset - Press Conference (V) (1:07)
6. Sushi on Sunset - Press Conference (VI) (1:35)
7. Sushi on Sunset - Press Conference (VII) (1:14)
8. Happy with What You Have to Be Happy With (Demo) (3:13)
9. Sushi on Sunset - Press Conference (Reprise) (0:53)
10. Message 22 (5:22)
11. Emerald Banter (0:58)
12. Superslow (4:33)
13. UMJ Offices Japan - Television Interview (I) (1:56)
14. UMJ Offices Japan - Television Interview (II) (4:58)
15. UMJ Offices Japan - Television Interview (III) (1:28)
16. UMJ Offices Japan - Television Interview (IV) (1:01)
17. UMJ Offices Japan - Television Interview (V) (3:44)
18. UMJ Offices Japan - Television Interview (VI) (3:02)
19. UMJ Offices Japan - Television Interview (VII) (4:43)
20. Sus-tayn-Z Suite (I) (3:22)
21. Sus-tayn-Z Suite (II) (4:46)
22. Sus-tayn Z Suite (III) (4:44)

"Sushi on Sunset" is an interview with Robert Fripp, Trey Gunn and Adrian Belew; the UMJ segment is with Fripp only.

== Personnel ==
King Crimson

- Adrian Belew – guitar, vocals, percussion
- Robert Fripp – guitar
- Trey Gunn – Warr guitar
- Pat Mastelotto – acoustic & electronic drums & percussion

Production personnel

- David Singleton and Robert Fripp – mastering
- P.J. Crook – cover artwork
- Hugh O'Donnell – design
