= Jazz Café Suite =

Live album by ProjeKct One
- Released: April 25, 2003
- Recorded: December 1–4, 1997
- Venue: The Jazz Café, London, England
- Genre: Jazz rock, free improvisation
- Length: 50:43
- Label: Discipline Global Mobile
- Producer: David Singleton and Alex R. Mundy

King Crimson Collector's Club chronology
Champaign–Urbana Sessions (2002)	Jazz Café Suite (2003)	Live in Orlando, FL (2003)

Professional ratings
Review scores
Source	Rating
Allmusic	4/5 stars

Jazz Café Suite is a live album by ProjeKct One, one of the four experimental sub-groups known as 'ProjeKcts' into which the band King Crimson 'fraKctalised' from 1997 to 1999. The album was released through the King Crimson Collector's Club in April 2003.

The tracks are edited highlights from four nights of group improvisation recorded live at The Jazz Café in Camden Town, London from December 1 to 4 1997.

The album includes liner notes by the band's bass player Tony Levin, official biographer Sid Smith, manager and sound engineer David Singleton, and assistant engineer and roadie Alex R. Mundy.

== Track listing ==
All music by Robert Fripp, Trey Gunn, Tony Levin and Bill Bruford

1. "Suite One" – 29:02
2. "Suite Two" – 15:13
3. "Suite Three" – 6:25

== Personnel ==
ProjeKct One

- Robert Fripp – electric guitar
- Trey Gunn – Warr guitar
- Tony Levin – bass guitar, electric upright bass, Chapman Stick, bass synthesizer
- Bill Bruford – acoustic drums, percussion

Production personnel

- David Singleton – recording engineer, mixing (2 & 3), mastering
- Bill Bruford – mixing (2 & 3)
- Ronan Chris Murphy – mixing (1)
- Alex R. Mundy – digital editing
- Tony Levin – photography
- Hugh O'Donnell – design
