= Heaven and Earth (ProjeKct X album) =

Studio album by ProjeKct X
- Released: 2000
- Recorded: 1999–2000
- Studio: StudioBelew, Ade's Garage, Pat's Garage and The Apartment
- Genre: Experimental rock, free improvisation, electronica
- Length: 72:28
- Label: Discipline Global Mobile
- Producer: Pat Mastelotto, Bill Munyon

Professional ratings
Review scores
Source	Rating
Allmusic	1.5/5 stars

In 2000, while the band King Crimson were recording the album The ConstruKction of Light, the four members simultaneously recorded improvised material as ProjeKct X. This continued the tradition of ProjeKcts One, Two, Three, and Four, experimental sub-groups which King Crimson had 'fraKctalised' into between 1997 and 1999.

Heaven and Earth was released in 2000 on the Discipline Global Mobile label in Europe and the U.S. and Pony Canyon in Japan The title track also appeared as the last track on The ConstruKction of Light.

== Track listing ==
All music by Adrian Belew, Robert Fripp, Trey Gunn and Pat Mastelotto

1. "The Business of Pleasure" – 2:45
2. "Hat in the Middle" – 3:44
3. "Side Window" – 3:09
4. "Maximizer" – 6:31
5. "Strange Ears (aging rapidly)" – 9:39
6. "Overhead Floor Mats Under Toe" – 5:47
7. "Six O'Clock" – 4:10
8. "Superbottomfeeder" – 8:08
9. "One E And" – 3:08
10. "Two Awkward Moments" – 1:11
11. "Demolition" – 7:08
12. "Conversation Pit" – 2:11
13. "Çin Alayı" – 1:58
14. "Heaven and Earth" – 8:19
15. "Belew Jay Way" – 5:02

== Personnel ==
ProjeKct X

- Adrian Belew – guitar and additional 'V Drumming' on "Side Window"
- Robert Fripp – guitar and soundscapes
- Trey Gunn – Warr guitar and baritone guitar
- Pat Mastelotto – electronic drums and percussion

Production personnel

- Recorded by Ken Latchney and Bill Munyon
- Digital engineering and arranging by Bill Munyon
- Produced and mixed by Pat Mastelotto and Bill Munyon
- Recorded during the rehearsals and recording of The ConstruKction of Light by King Crimson at StudioBelew
- Additional recording at Ade's Garage, Pat's Garage and The Apartment
- Mixed at Blue World, Ade's Garage and Pat's Garage
- Mastered by Alex R. Mundy and Robert Fripp at DGM HQ
- Art direction by Ioannis for Vivid Images Worldwide, LLC
- Digital art by Ioannis
- Design by Alan Chappell for Vivid Images Worldwide
- Video images and photographs by Trey Gunn
- Conversations, instruKctions and wordgames by ProjeKct X
