= EleKtrik: Live in Japan =

2003 live album by King Crimson

Live album by King Crimson
- Released: October 2003
- Recorded: Recorded at Kouseinenkin Kaikan, Tokyo, Japan, 16 April 2003
- Genre: Progressive rock
- Length: 74:39
- Label: Discipline Global Mobile
- Producer: Robert Fripp and David Singleton

King Crimson chronology
The Power to Believe (2003)	EleKtrik: Live in Japan (2003)	The Power to Believe Tour Box (2003)

Professional ratings
Review scores
Source	Rating
Allmusic	4/5 stars

EleKtrik: Live in Japan is a live album by the English progressive rock band King Crimson, recorded in Tokyo on April 16, 2003 and released later the same year. It consists of most of the soundtrack from the first disc of the band's double live DVD Eyes Wide Open.

== Track listing ==
1. "Introductory Soundscape" (Fripp) – 5:05
2. "The Power to Believe (Part I: A Cappella)" (Belew) – 0:41
3. "Level Five" (Belew, Fripp, Gunn, Mastelotto) – 7:22
4. "ProzaKc Blues" (Belew, Fripp, Gunn, Mastelotto) – 5:59
5. "Elektrik" (Belew, Fripp, Gunn, Mastelotto) – 8:01
6. "Happy with What You Have to Be Happy With" (Belew, Fripp, Gunn, Mastelotto) – 4:14
7. "One Time" (Belew, Fripp, Gunn, Levin, Bruford, Mastelotto) – 6:00
8. "Facts of Life" (Belew, Fripp, Gunn, Mastelotto) – 5:29
9. "The Power to Believe (Part II: Power Circle)" (Belew, Fripp, Gunn, Mastelotto) – 8:43
10. "Dangerous Curves" (Belew, Fripp, Gunn, Mastelotto) – 6:02
11. "Larks' Tongues in Aspic (Part IV)" (Belew, Fripp, Gunn, Mastelotto) – 10:32
  including:
  - "Coda: I Have a Dream"
12. "The World's My Oyster Soup Kitchen Floor Wax Museum" (Belew, Fripp, Gunn, Mastelotto) – 6:31

== Personnel ==
King Crimson

- Adrian Belew – guitar, vocals
- Robert Fripp – guitar
- Trey Gunn – Warr guitar, fretless Warr guitar
- Pat Mastelotto – acoustic & electronic drums & percussion

Production personnel

- Machine – mixing
- Michael Roze – mix assistant
- Robert Fripp and David Singleton – mastering
- P.J. Crook – cover artwork
- Bill Munyon – photography
- Hugh O'Donnell – design
