= Happy with What You Have to Be Happy With =

Happy With What You Have to Be Happy With

EP by King Crimson
- Released: 8 October 2002
- Genre: Progressive rock; progressive metal
- Length: 34:34
- Label: Sanctuary
- Producer: Robert Fripp and David Singleton; King Crimson and Machine (track 2)

King Crimson chronology
Ladies of the Road (2002)	Happy With What You Have to Be Happy With (2002)	The Power to Believe (2003)

Professional ratings
Review scores
Source	Rating
Allmusic	4/5 stars
Pitchfork Media	(3.9/10)

Happy with What You Have to Be Happy With (stylized in lowercase) is the third EP by the English progressive rock band King Crimson released in 2002, a companion to the subsequent album The Power to Believe (2003). Many of the songs on Happy With What You Have to Be Happy With can also be found on The Power to Believe, but there are differences; this version of "Happy with What You Have to Be Happy With" is longer by one chorus, and "Eyes Wide Open" uses primarily acoustic instrumentation.

== Track listing ==
No.	Title	Writer(s)	Length
1.	"Bude"	Adrian Belew	0:26
2.	"Happy with What You Have to Be Happy With"	Belew, Robert Fripp, Trey Gunn, Pat Mastelotto	4:12
3.	"Mie Gakure" (見え隠れ Appear and Disappear)	Belew, Fripp	2:00
4.	"She Shudders"	Belew	0:35
5.	"Eyes Wide Open"	Belew, Fripp, Gunn, Mastelotto	4:08
6.	"Shoganai" (しょうがない It Can't be Helped))	Belew	2:53
7.	"I Ran"	Belew	0:40
8.	"Potato Pie"	Belew, Fripp, Gunn, Mastelotto	5:03
9.	"Larks' Tongues in Aspic (Part IV)" (Recorded live at 328 Performance Hall, Nashville, USA, November 2001) "(Including "I Have a Dream")"	Belew, Fripp, Gunn, Mastelotto	10:26
10.	"Clouds"	Belew	4:11

Note: The song "Clouds" ends at 0:30. The hidden track "Einstein's Relatives" starts after 30 seconds of silence.

== Personnel ==
King Crimson

- Adrian Belew – guitar, vocals
- Robert Fripp – guitar
- Trey Gunn – Warr guitar, Ashbory bass
- Pat Mastelotto – drums, electronic percussion

Additional personnel

- Ken Latchney – recording and mixing engineer (except 2, 3 and 9)
- Machine – recording and mixing engineer (2)
- David Singleton – recording engineer (3), mastering
- Greg Dean – recording engineer (9)
- P.J. Crook – cover artwork
- Bill Munyon and Pat Mastelotto – photography
- Hugh O'Donnell – design
