= ProjeKcts =

Family of progressive rock groups

The ProjeKcts are a succession of experimental spin-off groups associated with the English progressive rock band King Crimson.

The ProjeKcts were most active from 1997 to 1999, but have performed intermittently since. These earlier ProjeKcts, up to ProjeKct Six in 2006, were devoted to instrumental and heavily improvised music. All of them included King Crimson guitarist Robert Fripp, who described their purpose as being "research and development" for King Crimson. Two later spin-off projects were of a different nature, but both involving former King Crimson members.

== History ==
=== FraKctalisation (1997–1999) ===
==== ProjeKct One (1997) ====
- Robert Fripp – electric guitar
- Trey Gunn – Warr guitar
- Tony Levin – bass guitar, electric upright bass, Chapman Stick, bass synthesizer
- Bill Bruford – acoustic drums, percussion

ProjeKct One began as a suggestion by Bruford to Robert Fripp that they do some improvisational shows together. Fripp suggested adding Gunn, while Bruford suggested adding Tony Levin — four of the six members of King Crimson were now involved.

Fripp then developed the idea of "fraKctals": multiple different subsets of the band working separately as a way of developing new material for King Crimson, the band having been at something of a compositional impasse.

ProjeKct One performed four consecutive shows at the Jazz Cafe from 1 through 4 December 1997. All four concerts have been made available for download through DGMLive. These performances marked the end of Bruford's involvement with King Crimson in any form.

==== ProjeKct Two (1997–1998) ====
- Robert Fripp – electric guitar
- Trey Gunn – Warr guitar, talker
- Adrian Belew – Roland V-Drums

While ProjeKct One was the first of the sub-groups planned, ProjeKct Two actually convened and recorded first. It featured Fripp, Gunn and Adrian Belew on drums rather than guitar (his usual instrument with King Crimson). This configuration was unplanned, but when the group gathered at Belew's home studio to record, he had recently taken possession of the V-drums and Fripp was keen to experiment with their use. The group enjoyed the results enough that it was decided to keep this configuration for the whole course of the project.

They released the studio album Space Groove in 1998. Additionally, they performed thirty-five concerts between February and July 1998. All thirty-five shows have been made available for download through DGMLive.

==== ProjeKct Three (1999, 2003) ====
- Robert Fripp – electric guitar
- Trey Gunn – Warr guitar, talker
- Pat Mastelotto – electronic percussion, samples, beat box (1999); acoustic and electronic percussion (2003)

ProjeKct Three (P3) performed five shows from 21 March through 25 March 1999 in Texas. In May 2014 all five shows were made available for download from DGMLive.

On 3 March 2003, P3 performed instead of King Crimson at the Birchmere in the Washington, DC, area, as Adrian Belew was taken ill that night. Following their impromptu performance, the three band members interacted with the audience in the form of a question and answer session. This is the only other full concert appearance of P3 other than the tour of Texas in March 1999. The performance is available on CD (ProjeKct Three – Live in Alexandria, VA, 2003), however, the Q&A session on the CD is incomplete. The complete Q&A is available separately as a download at the DGMLive web site.

==== ProjeKct Four (1998) ====
- Robert Fripp – electric guitar
- Trey Gunn – Warr guitar, talker
- Tony Levin – bass guitar, electric upright bass, Chapman Stick
- Pat Mastelotto – electronic percussion, samples, beat box

ProjeKct Four performed a seven-show tour of the United States from 23 October – 2 November 1998. These shows consisted of improvised material, as well as expanded upon material developed by earlier ProjeKcts.

All seven of these shows have been made available for download through DGMLive.

=== ProjeKct X (2000) ===
ProjeKct X was not a group as such, but an alter ego to the Fripp/Belew/Mastelotto/Gunn King Crimson lineup that produced a CD based on material recorded during The ConstruKction of Light sessions and remixed and re-assembled by the band, particularly Mastelotto and Gunn. The resulting album, Heaven and Earth, was released in 2000 alongside The ConstruKction of Light. Additionally, when the 2000-2003 group performed improvised pieces during their live shows, they would use the name ProjeKct X to differentiate themselves from the regular King Crimson, thus freeing up their talents to stray beyond the usual repertoire.

=== ProjeKct Six (2006) ===
- Robert Fripp – guitar, soundscapes
- Adrian Belew – Roland V-Drums, bass triggers

The ProjeKcts were then dormant until 2006, when Fripp on guitar and Belew on drums played live under the name ProjeKct Six. There has been no ProjeKct Five, but in 2006, Fripp mentioned plans for a ProjeKct Five distinct from the then current King Crimson line-up (Fripp, Belew, Levin, Mastelotto).

Porcupine Tree invited ProjeKct Six to play as their support band.

=== Jakszyk, Fripp and Collins - A King Crimson ProjeKct (2010–11) ===
- Jakko Jakszyk – guitars, vocals, guzheng, keyboards
- Robert Fripp – guitars, soundscapes
- Mel Collins – alto and soprano saxophones, flute
- Tony Levin – bass guitars, Chapman Stick
- Gavin Harrison – drums, percussion

A project including Jakko Jakszyk along with Crimson alumni Fripp and Mel Collins (returning after 40 years), this was ultimately dubbed "A King Crimson ProjeKct," and has been referred to by Fripp as "ProjeKct 7". The album A Scarcity of Miracles features this line-up, along with other Crimson alumni Tony Levin and Gavin Harrison. Everyone who performed on the album later joined King Crimson full-time in 2013. This is the only ProjeKct not to play live ever, however 2 songs from the album were later performed by the reunited King Crimson in 2014: the title track and "The Light Of Day"

=== The Crimson ProjeKCt (2011–2014) ===
- Adrian Belew – guitar, vocals
- Tony Levin – bass, Chapman Stick
- Pat Mastelotto – acoustic and electronic drums and percussion
- Markus Reuter – Touch Guitars U8 and soundscapes
- Julie Slick – bass guitar
- Tobias Ralph – acoustic drums

In August 2011, Levin, Mastelotto and Belew organised the "3 of a Perfect Pair Camp", a music seminar that included daily group performances of King Crimson repertoire by the trio, partway through being joined by Markus Reuter (touch guitar) from Stick Men, plus Julie Slick (bass) and Tobias Ralph (drums) from the Adrian Belew Power Trio.

This performance was a preview of the "Two of a Perfect Trio" tour of the US and Canada in September–October 2011 which comprised sets by Stick Men (Tony Levin on Chapman Stick and vocals; Pat Mastelotto on drums, percussion, vocals; and Markus Reuter on touch-style guitars), The Adrian Belew Power Trio (Belew on guitar, vocal and pre-recorded samples, Slick on bass and either Tobias Ralph or Danny Carey on drums) and then a final set by all six musicians (Levin, Mastelotto, Belew, Slick, Reuter and Ralph) or various subsets thereof playing King Crimson material from the 1994-1996 tours' setlists (using the original "double trio" configuration which this particular 6-musicians-ensemble mirrors, with Slick playing Trey Gunn's parts, Ralph playing Bill Bruford's parts, and Reuter playing Robert Fripp's parts).

In the summer of 2012, this sextet supported Dream Theater on a US tour under the name "The Crimson ProjeKCt" and have retained this moniker ever since.

As Robert Fripp stated in his Saturday 14 April 2012 diary: "Tony and myself discussed the not-easily-doable name of "Stick Men & The Adrian Belew Power Trio That Do A Set Of King Crimson Music". Tony's suggestion was "ProjeKct Krimson". Mine was "The Crimson ProjeKCt"."

The Crimson ProjeKCt has toured the United States twice and performed in both Russia and Japan. There are official live recordings available from these tours, including the Dream Theater shows. This is the only ProjeKct to date not to include Robert Fripp.

During 2014, the band toured in Australia, New Zealand and, for the first time, Europe.

== ProjeKcts Discography ==
ProjeKct One
- Live at the Jazz Café (1998, Japan-only)
- Jazz Café Suite (2003, King Crimson Collector's Club)
- London, Jazz Café, England – December 4, 1997 (2005, DGM Live)

ProjeKct Two
- Space Groove (1998)
- Live Groove (1999, Japan-only)
- Live in Northampton, MA (2001, King Crimson Collector's Club)
- I.C. Light Music Tent, Pittsburgh, Pennsylvania (2005, DGM Live)
- Live in Chicago, IL (2006, King Crimson Collector's Club)

ProjeKct Three
- Masque (1999, Japan-only)
- Live in Austin, TX (2004, King Crimson Collectors' Club)
- Live in Alexandria, VA (2007, King Crimson Collectors' Club)

ProjeKct Four
- West Coast Live (1999, Japan-only)
- Live in San Francisco: The Roar of P4 (1999, King Crimson Collectors' Club)

ProjeKct One, Two, Three, Four
- The ProjeKcts (1999)

(4-CD live box set including all of the above Japan-only releases, released under the King Crimson name)

ProjeKct One, Two, Three, Four
- The Deception of the Thrush: A Beginners' Guide to ProjeKcts (1999)

(Live compilation album from The ProjeKcts box set, released under the King Crimson name)

ProjeKct X
- Heaven and Earth (2000)

ProjeKct Six
- East Coast Live (2006, DGM Live)

ProjeKct One, Two, Three, Four, X, Six
- Heaven & Earth (box set) (2019)

(Comprehensive 24-disc box set of the 1997-2008 era, released under the King Crimson name)

Jakszyk, Fripp and Collins with Levin and Harrison
- A Scarcity of Miracles (2011)

The Crimson ProjeKCt
- Official Bootleg Live 2012 – Live compilation album from tour supporting Dream Theater (2013)
- Official Bootleg Limited Edition (Live Recorded at Club Citta' On Mar.15.2013)
- Official Bootleg Limited Edition (Live Recorded at Club Citta' On Mar.16.2013)
- Official Bootleg Limited Edition (Live Recorded at Club Citta' On Mar.17.2013)
- Live In Tokyo (2014)
