= P. J. Crook =

British artist, painter and sculptor

Pamela June Crook MBE (born 1945), known professionally as P J Crook, is an English painter and sculptor. Her shows have appeared in London, France, the United States, Japan, Canada, and Estonia. Her professional name "P J Crook" lacks full stops; variant stylings such as "P. J. Crook" have appeared.

Crook was born in 1945 in Cheltenham, England, where she still lives. She is represented by the Panter & Hall gallery on Pall Mall in London and Galerie Alain Blondel in Paris.

== Art ==
From a studio opposite her house, she manages compositions on a monumental scale — paintings can measure 2 × 4.5 metres and also paints small pictures, some no larger than 10 cm square. She works in tinted gesso, acrylic and sometimes in oil on canvas. She often paints crowds, either in motion in urban environments or standing still reading newspapers, many of which are on undulating 3D corrugated structures as with 'The Smell of the Horse, the Roar of the Crowd" (coll. Cheltenham Art Gallery & Museum), "Other Mothers' Sons" (coll. Imperial War Museum, London) "Paper Hat" and "The Kiss" (coll. Morohashi Museum of Modern Art, Japan). These have led onto her three dimensional sculptures mainly constructed out of found objects.

In 1996, Crook co-starred with musician Toyah Willcox on the HTV short film Rolinda Sharples: Painted out of History. The production led to a friendship between the two, and later on to Wilcox's husband, King Crimson/ProjeKcts guitarist Robert Fripp. Wilcox and Fripp own some of Crook's paintings, and the latter has used them as covers for his group's releases.

== Distinctions: patronage, trusts and honours ==
Crook is a Patron of the National Star College Cheltenham; a Patron of Linc; a Patron of Artshape; a sometime Trustee and director of ACS (the Artists' Collecting Society); Patron of Cheltenham Open Studios; a Gloucestershire Ambassador; President of the Friends of Cheltenham Art Gallery & Museum; member of the Royal West of England Academy; Manchester Academy of Fine Arts. She is a member of the Chelsea Arts Club and the Honourable Company of Gloucestershire. PJ Crook has an honorary Doctor of Arts from the University of Gloucestershire and is an honorary vice President of Gloucestershire College.

Crook was appointed Member of the Order of the British Empire (MBE) in the 2011 Birthday Honours for services to art.

== List of King Crimson album covers ==
PJ Crook's paintings are featured on the covers of many King Crimson albums. Many of these albums are produced by Discipline Global Mobile (DGM), the music company founded by Robert Fripp. Crook retains the copyrights and moral rights to her artwork.

Painting(s)	Album	Painting date	Release date
The Nightwatch	The Night Watch	1996	1997
The Four Seasons	Epitaph déjà VROOOM (booklet p. 7)	1990-94	1997; 1999
Absent Lovers I [Nude]	Absent Lovers: Live in Montreal déjà VROOOM (booklet pp. 13–14)	1998	1998; 1999
Absent Lovers II [Empty Bed]	Absent Lovers: Live in Montreal	1998	1998
Now and Then	déjà VROOOM (cover; booklet outer pages, pp. 1–6, 17, 18)	1997-8	1999
unidentified painting	déjà VROOOM (booklet pp. 15–16)	????	1999
Saint Genesius	The ProjeKcts; The Deception of the Thrush: A Beginners' Guide to ProjeKcts	1988	1999
Piano Bar	Live at the Jazz Café (front cover)	1998	1999
unidentified paintings	Live at the Jazz Café	????	1999
Masque	Masque	1986	1999
Cirkus	Cirkus: The Young Persons' Guide to King Crimson Live	1993	1999
Winter of Discontent	Heavy ConstruKction	1993	2000
The Writing on the Wall	Level Five (front cover); The Power to Believe (outer back inlay); The Power to Believe Tour Box	1993	2001; 2003
déjà VROOOM	Vrooom Vrooom (Live in Mexico City) déjà VROOOM (booklet pp. 11–12)	1996	2001; 1999
On Broadway	Vrooom Vrooom (on Broadway); Live in Argentina, 1994	1996	2001; 2012
Sidewalkers	Ladies of the Road	1998	2002
It Could be Us	Happy with What You Have to Be Happy With (front cover)	????	2002
Waiting	Shoganai; Happy with What You Have to Be Happy With (back cover)	1986	2002
Fin de Siècle	The Power to Believe; Level Five (back cover; CD label)	1999	2003; 2001
unidentified painting	The Power to Believe (inner back inlay); Heaven & Earth (inner top lid)	????	2003
The Outsider	Eyes Wide Open; EleKtrik: Live in Japan	1994	2003
Fairground	Neal and Jack and Me	????	2004
unidentified paintings	The 21st Century Guide to King Crimson – Volume One – 1969–1974	????	2004
March 30	The 21st Century Guide to King Crimson – Volume One (inner cover)	1993	2004
Harry's Bar	The 21st Century Guide to King Crimson – Volume One (disc 2)	1985	2004
Sunday (Reading in Bed)	The 21st Century Guide to King Crimson – Volume One (disc 3)	????	2004
unidentified paintings	The 21st Century Guide to King Crimson – Volume Two – 1981–2003	????	2004
Good Morning, M. Balladur	The 21st Century Guide to King Crimson – Volume Two (inner cover)	????	2004
unidentified paintings	The Condensed 21st Century Guide to King Crimson	????	2004
Tuesday	The Condensed 21st Century Guide to King Crimson (front cover)	2002	2004
unidentified painting	The Great Deceiver 1: Live 1973-1974	????	2007
unidentified painting	The Great Deceiver 2: Live 1973-1974	????	2007
Expresso	40th Anniversary Tour Box; The 21st Century Guide to King Crimson – Volume One (disc 1)	1997	2008; 2004
Christian Children, Marching, Singing	A Scarcity of Miracles	????	2011
Nocturne	The ReconstruKction of Light; Heaven & Earth	2012	2019
