= Eyes Wide Open (King Crimson album) =

Video by King Crimson
- Released: 2003
- Recorded: Kouseinenkin Kaikan, Tokyo, Japan, 16 April 2003; Shepherd's Bush Empire, London, England, 3 July 2000; Various locations, June–July 2000
- Genre: Progressive rock
- Label: Discipline Global Mobile

King Crimson chronology
Déjà Vrooom (1999)	Eyes Wide Open (2003)	Neal and Jack and Me (2004)

Eyes Wide Open is a live 2 DVD set by the band King Crimson, released in 2003. It presents two concerts filmed in the early 2000s featuring the lineup of Adrian Belew, Robert Fripp, Trey Gunn and Pat Mastelotto.

Disc one was filmed at the Kouseinenkin Kaikan in Tokyo, Japan, on 16 April 2003 during the tour promoting The Power to Believe. It is presented in non-anamorphic 1.66:1 format. Zooming the image is required on widescreen TVs to avoid black bars on all four sides. Also included, as an extra feature, is an excerpt from the sound and camera check before the show. In addition, the CD EleKtrik: Live in Japan features most of the audio of this concert.

Disc two was filmed at the Shepherd's Bush Empire in London, on 3 July 2000, the final night of the band's European summer tour for The ConstruKction of Light. It is presented in 1.33:1 format. The footage is divided in sections, and the disc is programmed to randomly insert improvisations, filmed on various shows during the tour, in between them. The improvisations can also be accessed separately, as an extra feature.

== Track listing ==
All songs written by Adrian Belew, Robert Fripp, Trey Gunn and Pat Mastelotto, except where noted.

=== DVD 1: Live in Japan – Tokyo, Kouseinenkin Kaikan, April 16, 2003 ===
1. "Introductory Soundscape" (Fripp)
2. "The Power to Believe I: (A Cappella)" (Belew)
3. "Level Five"
4. "ProzaKc Blues"
5. "the construKction of light"
6. "Happy with What You Have to Be Happy With"
7. "Elektrik"
8. "One Time" (Belew, Fripp, Gunn, Levin, Bruford, Mastelotto)
9. "Facts of Life"
10. "The Power to Believe II (Power Circle)"
11. "Dangerous Curves"
12. "Larks' Tongues in Aspic: Part IV"
13. "The Deception of the Thrush" (Fripp, Gunn, Belew)
14. "The World's My Oyster Soup Kitchen Floor Wax Museum"

==== Extras ====
- Tokyo Sound & Camera Check
1. "Indiscretion I"
2. "Indiscretion II"
3. "Indiscretion III"

=== DVD 2: Live at the Shepherds Bush Empire – London, July 3, 2000 ===
1. "Into the Frying Pan"
2. "The ConstruKction of Light"
3. "VROOOM" (Belew, Fripp, Gunn, Levin, Bruford, Mastelotto)
4. "One Time" (Belew, Fripp, Gunn, Levin, Bruford, Mastelotto)
5. "London Improv 1: Blasticus SS Blastica"
6. "Dinosaur" (Belew, Fripp, Gunn, Levin, Bruford, Mastelotto)
7. "The World's My Oyster Soup Kitchen Floor Wax Museum"
8. "London Improv 2: C Blasticum"
9. "Cage" (Belew, Fripp, Gunn, Levin, Bruford, Mastelotto)
10. "ProzaKc Blues"
11. "Larks' Tongues in Aspic: Part IV"
12. "Three of a Perfect Pair" (Belew, Fripp, Levin, Bruford)
13. "The Deception of the Thrush" (Fripp, Gunn, Belew)
14. "Sex, Sleep, Eat, Drink, Dream" (Belew, Fripp, Gunn, Levin, Bruford, Mastelotto)
15. " "Heroes" " (Bowie, Eno)

==== Extras ====
- Improvising Crimson
1. "London Improv 1: Blasticus SS Blastica"
2. "London Improv 2: C Blasticum"
3. "Barcelona Improv 1: El Groovistico SS Blastico"
4. "Barcelona Improv 2: C Blastica"
5. "San Sebastian Improv: Crim Chill Thrill"
6. "Rome Improv 1: Mastelotticus SS Blasticus"
7. "Rome Improv 2: C Chill Unchill" (Note: Erroneously numbered "Rome Improv 1" in the DVD menu)
8. "Conegliano Improv: Mastelotto Maximatamus Est"
9. "Copenhagen Improv: Heaven Groovistica"
10. "The Deception of the Thrush 1: London" (Fripp, Gunn, Belew)
11. "The Deception of the Thrush 2: San Sebastian" (Fripp, Gunn, Belew)
12. "The Deception of the Thrush 3: Paris" (Fripp, Gunn, Belew)

== Personnel ==
- Adrian Belew – guitar, vocals
- Robert Fripp – guitar
- Trey Gunn – Warr Guitar
- Pat Mastelotto – acoustic/electronic drums & percussion
