= B'Boom: Live in Argentina =

Live album by King Crimson
- Released: 22 August 1995
- Recorded: 6–16 October 1994
- Venue: Broadway Theatre, Buenos Aires; Córdoba ("Heartbeat").
- Genre: Progressive rock, experimental rock
- Length: 111:06
- Label: Discipline Global Mobile
- Producer: Robert Fripp and David Singleton

King Crimson chronology
Thrak (1995)	B'Boom: Live in Argentina (1995)	Thrakattak (1996)

Professional ratings
Review scores
Source	Rating
Allmusic	4.5/5 stars

B'Boom: Live in Argentina is a live album (2-CD set) by the band King Crimson, released in 1995. All songs were recorded between 6 and 16 October 1994 at the Broadway Theatre in Buenos Aires, Argentina, except for "Heartbeat" which was recorded in Córdoba.

King Crimson's Argentinian shows in late 1994 were the first live performances by the band in over ten years. Prior to B'Boom's release, a live recording from this tour was sold illegally by an Italian bootleg company. The price of the bootleg was 28 pounds United Kingdom, and the sound quality was said to be "appalling." The recordings on B'Boom are taken from soundboard mixes. However, the album was issued by DGM in something of a hurry to counter the Italian bootleg and they transplanted the line-up and instrument credits directly from the THRAK album. As a result of this, the credit of "Mellotron" by Robert Fripp is an error – although there is Mellotron on THRAK, there is none on B'Boom, nor was one used on this Argentinian tour.

== Track listing ==
All songs written by Belew, Fripp, Gunn, Levin, Bruford and Mastelotto, unless otherwise indicated.

=== Disc one ===
1. "VROOOM" (including "Coda: Marine 475") – 7:07
2. "Frame by Frame" (Belew, Fripp, Levin, Bruford) – 5:24
3. "Sex Sleep Eat Drink Dream" – 4:48
4. "Red" (Fripp) – 6:08
5. "One Time" – 5:35
6. "B'Boom" – 6:47
7. "THRAK" – 6:28
8. "Improv – Two Sticks" (Gunn, Levin) – 1:25
9. "Elephant Talk" (Belew, Fripp, Levin, Bruford) – 4:25
10. "Indiscipline" (Belew, Fripp, Levin, Bruford) – 7:20

=== Disc two ===
1. "VROOOM VROOOM" – 6:18
2. "Matte Kudasai" (Belew, Fripp, Levin, Bruford) – 3:36
3. "The Talking Drum" (Cross, Fripp, Wetton, Bruford, Muir) – 5:44
4. "Larks' Tongues in Aspic (Part II)" (Fripp) – 7:30
5. "Heartbeat" (Belew, Fripp, Levin, Bruford) – 3:51
6. "Sleepless" (Belew, Fripp, Levin, Bruford) – 6:05
7. "People" – 5:22
8. "B'Boom" (Reprise) – 4:16
9. "THRAK" – 5:33

== Personnel ==
King Crimson

- Adrian Belew – guitar, lead vocals
- Robert Fripp – guitar
- Trey Gunn – Chapman Stick, backing vocals
- Tony Levin – bass guitar, Ned Steinberger upright bass, Chapman Stick, backing vocals
- Bill Bruford – electronic drums & percussion
- Pat Mastelotto – acoustic drums & percussion

Production personnel

- George Glossop – live sound engineer
- Noah Evens – stage sound engineer
- Carlos Pulido – assistant engineer
- John Sinks – equipment and strategic liaison
- David Singleton – digital editing engineer
- Robert Fripp and David Singleton – mastering
- Bill Smith Studio – design and computer images

== Charts ==
Chart (1995)	Peak position
Japanese Albums (Oricon)	67
