= The Construkction of Light =

The ConstruKction of Light

Studio album by King Crimson
- Released: 23 May 2000
- Recorded: 1999
- Studios: StudioBelew, Mount Juliet, Tennessee
- Genres: Progressive rock; progressive metal; industrial metal
- Length: 58:18
- Label: Virgin
- Producer: King Crimson

King Crimson chronology
A Beginners' Guide to the King Crimson Collectors' Club (2000)	The ConstruKction of Light (2000)	Heavy ConstruKction (2000)

King Crimson studio chronology
Thrak (1995)	The ConstruKction of Light (2000)	The Power to Believe (2003)

The ReconstruKction of Light cover

The Construkction of Light (stylised as the construKction of light) is the twelfth studio album by the English progressive rock band King Crimson, released on 23 May 2000 by Virgin Records. It is the first of two studio albums to feature the "double duo" line-up of Adrian Belew, Robert Fripp, Trey Gunn and Pat Mastelotto. It is the group's longest studio album and the only one not to chart in the United States.

== Recording and release ==
In the late 1990s, drummer Bill Bruford and bassist Tony Levin left King Crimson, ending the "double trio" era documented on THRAK. For the first time in the group's history, Robert Fripp was the only Englishman in the lineup. (Note: The Power to Believe had the same lineup as the construKction of light.)

The Construkction of Light bears a sound similar to the "rock gamelan" 1980s incarnation of King Crimson, with Mastelotto primarily playing electronic drums and Belew, Gunn and Fripp often playing sophisticated, interlocking parts. However, the pace of these interlocking parts is often slower than it was in the 1980s, with Belew and Fripp often trading single notes back and forth in hocket.

The album also contains two sequels to instrumental pieces by 1970s incarnations of the band. "Larks' Tongues in Aspic – Part IV" continues the series of pieces started on Larks' Tongues in Aspic and continued on Three of a Perfect Pair. "FraKctured" began as a fifth entry in the "Larks" suite, but was renamed after being judged as more reminiscent of "Fracture" from Starless and Bible Black.

Fripp was unhappy with the album, considering that it "doesn't convey the power of the music, to a greater extent than any of the [King Crimson] studio albums", as none of the music was played live before the recording, Mastelotto used only electronic drums instead of his preferred hybrid acoustic/electronic kit, and Fripp's attention was focused more on writing and playing than on recording and production. Discipline Global Mobile later considered "re-assembling" the album with live recordings instead of reissuing the studio version.

In 2019, a substantial reworking of the album was released as The ReconstruKction of Light, when parts of the original recording were found to be lost. Mastelotto re-recorded all of his drum parts on a predominantly acoustic kit. The remix of "FraKctured" was released as part of the KC50 series of archival recordings that year.

== Reception ==
Professional ratings
Review scores
Source	Rating
AllMusic	2/5 stars
PopMatters	8/10 stars
Encyclopedia of Popular Music	3/5 stars

AllMusic wrote that the band "fall flat with The ConstruKction of Light [...] Unable to shed the weight of their oft-brilliant history, the most promising moments of ConstruKction are crushed underneath the bulk. What makes ConstruKction such a disappointment is, despite how 'progressive' the band-fragmenting ProjeKct approach appeared on paper, upon execution, it produced an utterly backward-looking album."

German prog magazine eclipsed, on the other hand, rated the album as the third best King Crimson album ever, and also included it in their list of the 150 best progressive rock albums of all time.

Regarding the revised 2019 version, Mark Smotroff of Audiophile Review noted that "the dynamics are much better...Mastelotto has arguably rescued this album by adding an impassioned new live drum track."

== Track listing ==
All music written by Adrian Belew, Robert Fripp, Trey Gunn and Pat Mastelotto; all lyrics written by Adrian Belew.

The ConstrucKction of Light
No.	Title	Length
1.	"ProzaKc Blues"	5:27
2.	"The ConstruKction of Light" (instrumental)	5:49
3.	"The ConstruKction of Light"	2:50
4.	"Into the Frying Pan"	6:54
5.	"FraKctured" (instrumental)	9:06
6.	"The World's My Oyster Soup Kitchen Floor Wax Museum"	6:24
7.	"Larks' Tongues in Aspic – Part IV" (instrumental)	3:41
8.	"Larks' Tongues in Aspic – Part IV" (instrumental)	2:50
9.	"Larks' Tongues in Aspic – Part IV" (instrumental)	2:36
10.	"Coda: I Have a Dream"	4:51
11.	"Heaven and Earth" (instrumental) (as ProjeKct X)	7:46

Note: Digital editions of the album do not split "The ConstruKction of Light" or "Larks' Tongues in Aspic – Part IV" (including "Coda: I Have a Dream") into multiple tracks.

== Personnel ==
King Crimson

- Adrian Belew – electric guitar, vocals
- Robert Fripp – electric guitar
- Trey Gunn – Warr guitar, Ashbory bass
- Pat Mastelotto – electronic drums; acoustic and electronic drums on ReconstruKction edition

Additional personnel

- Ken Latchney – recording, mixing
- Bill Munyon – additional recording, mixing
- Simon Heyworth – mastering
- David Singleton – mastering, management
- Ioannis – art direction, digital art
- Alan Chappell – design
- PJ Crook - painting Nocturne on the ReconstruKction edition

== Chart performance ==
Chart (2000)	Peak position
German Albums (Offizielle Top 100)	67
Italian Albums (FIMI)	18
Japanese Albums (Oricon)	31
UK Albums (Official Charts)	129
