= Julie Slick =

American songwriter and bassist (born 1986)

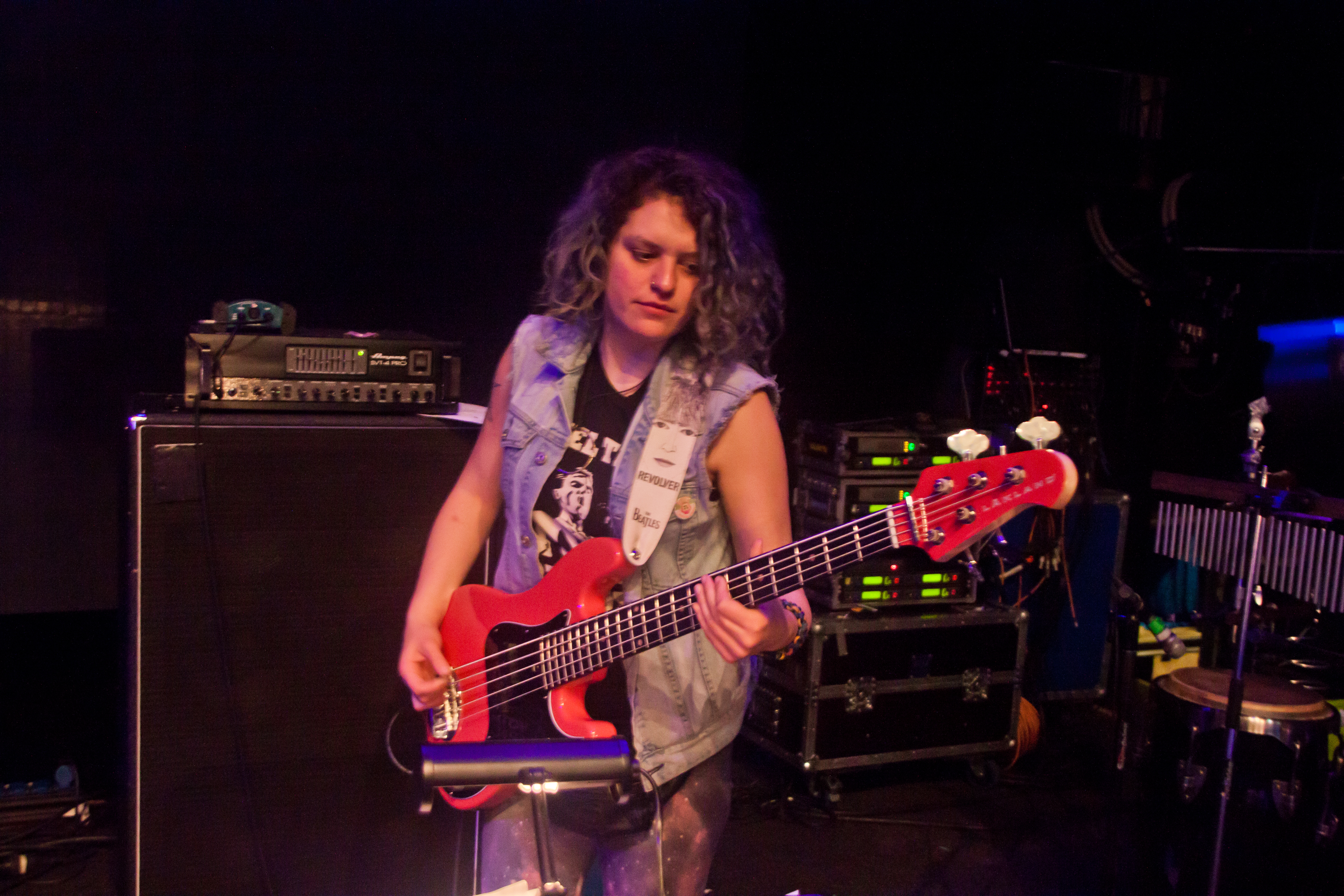

Background information
- Born: Julie Slick; 1986 (age 39–40)
- Origin: Philadelphia, Pennsylvania, United States
- Genres: Progressive Rock, Post Rock, Punk
- Occupations: Musician, songwriter
- Instrument: Bass
- Years active: 2005–present
- Website: www.julieslick.com

Julie Slick (born 1986) is an American musician primarily known as a bassist. She started her career in 1998 at the age of 12 in the original Paul Green School of Rock (company) where she continued studying until 2004, a year after she graduated high school. Slick went on to graduate Magna Cum Laude from Drexel University in 2008 in the music industry program.

She is best known for her work with the Adrian Belew Power Trio, Jerry Harrison and Adrian Belew's "Remain in Light" project, the King Crimson spin-off ProjeKcts (featuring Tony Levin and Pat Mastelotto), and her own bands EchoTest, Paper Cat, and solo work. She has appeared on solo and collaboration albums starting with her first solo album titled "Julie Slick", released in 2010 to positive reviews, and on albums from her band EchoTest. Slick has also collaborated with a wide variety of artists including Béla Fleck and the Flecktones, Robert Fripp, Ann Wilson, Alice Cooper, Victor Wooten, Stewart Copeland, and Jon Anderson.

== Early life ==
Julie and her younger brother Eric Slick both attended Paul Green's School Of Rock in Philadelphia starting in 1998, the year it was founded. Julie was 12 at the time and she later appeared in the documentary Rock School (film) as well as playing in several tracks on the movie's soundtrack with artists including Ann Wilson, Jon Anderson, and Alice Cooper.

== Career ==
It was through the School Of Rock that she came to the attention of Adrian Belew. Slick and her brother Eric auditioned for Belew at his home studio in Tennessee and both joined The Adrian Belew Power Trio in 2006. Eric eventually left the band to pursue other projects but Julie has been a staple in the band's line-up ever since.

In 2010 she released her first solo album titled Julie Slick to enthusiastic reviews. The album featured her brother Eric, along with King Crimson drummer Pat Mastelotto, drummer Marco Minnemann as well as sampled soundscapes from Robert Fripp. The album has been described as a tour-de-force of bass playing, but not just a bass album and one that manages to create successful melodies with a solid groove. She straddled the line between pop and prog and creating an album that could appeal to both sides with accessible melodies that blend pop and funk song structures with prog stylings.

Slick's second album, Terroir, was released in 2012 and again included Mastelotto, David Torn, Minnemann, Belew, her brother Eric, and others. This album, like her first, is described as a work based on melodies and patterns more than chords. The King Crimson influence is apparent on some tracks where others range more towards acoustic and ethereal sounds.

In 2011, while attending the "Three Of A Perfect Pair" music camp hosted by Tony Levin, Pat Mastelotto, and Adrian Belew, she met Marco Machera, an Italian bassist/songwriter. In 2014, while touring Europe with the King Crimson spin-off Crimson ProjeKct, they reconnected and began work on a collaboration that would become the band EchoTest. Their first album, "Fourth Dementia" was released later that year and featured drummers Pat Mastelotto, her brother Eric Slick, and violinist Sarah Anderson. EchoTest went on to record 4 more albums, with the most recent being the 2022 release "Mount Si" which features drummer Alessandro Inolti.

== Discography ==
=== As solo artist ===
- Julie Slick (2010)
- Terroir (2012)

=== With EchoTest ===
- Fourth Dementia (2014)
- Le Fil Rouge (2015)
- From Two Balconies (2017)
- Daughter Of Ocean (2019)
- Mount Si (2022)
