= Thrak =

Studio album by King Crimson
- Released: 3 April 1995
- Recorded: 24 October – 4 December 1994
- Studio: Real World (Box, Wiltshire)
- Genres: Progressive rock; progressive metal; industrial rock
- Length: 56:35
- Label: Virgin
- Producers: King Crimson; David Bottrill

King Crimson chronology
Vrooom (1994)	Thrak (1995)	B'Boom: Live in Argentina (1995)

King Crimson studio chronology
Three of a Perfect Pair (1984)	Thrak (1995)	The ConstruKction of Light (2000)

Singles from Thrak
- 1. "Dinosaur" Released: 1995 (US); 2. "Sex Sleep Eat Drink Dream" Released: 1995 (US)

Thrak (stylised in all caps) is the eleventh studio album by the English progressive rock band King Crimson, released on 3 April 1995 through Virgin Records. It was preceded by the mini-album Vrooom in 1994, which contained early versions of some of the same material. It was the group's first full-length studio album since Three of a Perfect Pair eleven years earlier, and their only full album to feature the "double trio" lineup of Adrian Belew, Robert Fripp, Trey Gunn, Tony Levin, Bill Bruford and Pat Mastelotto. It is the group's final studio album to feature either Bruford or Levin.

== Recording ==
Thrak was recorded in late 1994 at Peter Gabriel's Real World Studios in Box, Wiltshire, England, with producer David Bottrill. Bottrill had previously produced Fripp and David Sylvian's 1993 album The First Day, which had featured Trey Gunn as a session player; both Gunn and Mastelotto had subsequently played in Fripp and Sylvian's touring band. With the band consisting of two guitarists, two bassists and two drummers, the opening track begins with all six musicians in the center of the audio mix; as the album progresses, they are split into two trios, with one in each stereo channel.

Bill Bruford assumed that this lineup would be a continuation from their work in the 1980s but instead found that the band had adopted a heavier sound reminiscent of Red (1974). The band wrote the compositions at Belew's home studio in Nashville, Tennessee and Fripp's house in Wiltshire. Fripp primarily composed the instrumental sections, while Belew focused on lyrics and melodies.

"Sex Sleep Eat Drink Dream" and "One Time" were developed at studio rehearsals for the 1994 mini-album Vrooom in Woodstock, New York, during the spring of 1994. Instrumental outtakes and improvisations from these sessions would later be released as The Vrooom Sessions in 1999. "Sex Sleep Eat Drink Dream" developed from the instrumental outtake "No Questions Asked".

"Fashionable" was another instrumental from The Vrooom Sessions that was re-recorded at Real World during the sessions. It features a guitar line reminiscent of David Bowie's "Fashion", on which Fripp played. Despite being reworked with various additions and refinements by the band members, the piece was ultimately cut from the album. On "People", Tony Levin recorded the bass track by striking the strings with small drumsticks known as funk fingers, which he attached to his digits; he had first used this technique while working with Peter Gabriel on the song "Big Time" (there aided by Jerry Marotta).

"Vrooom Vrooom" incorporates a middle section originally composed by Fripp in 1974 for Red’s instrumental title track. The band had also experimented with this material in 1983, while working on Three of a Perfect Pair; evidence of this is the track "Working on Sleepless" from the 2016 compilation Rehearsals & Blows.

== Release ==
First released on 3 April 1995, Thrak reached number 58 in the UK Albums Chart, their most recent release to make the chart. The album was reissued on CD in 2002 in a remastered edition. A significantly different 5.1 surround sound mix by Jakko Jakszyk was released as a CD/DVD-A in October 2015 for the “40th Anniversary Series” alongside a new stereo mix by Fripp and Jakszyk. These two mixes were also included in the 2015 THRAK BOX alongside previously unissued studio and live recordings from the period.

== Reception ==
Professional ratings
Review scores
Source	Rating
AllMusic	4/5 stars
Maxim	4/5 stars
Q	4/5 stars
Rolling Stone	3/5 stars
Trouser Press	favourable

Billboard believed that Thrak was a reinterpretation of King Crimson's Red and early 1980s eras rather than an album that broke new ground. They called Thrak "a welcome return by a progressive outfit that never lost its footing." Trouser Press described Thrak as "an absolute monster, a cerebral sextet adventure stunning in its precisely controlled rock power."

In a retrospective review of the album, Daniel Gioffre of AllMusic called King Crimson "the only progressive rock band from the '60s to be making new, vital, progressive music in the '90s" and expressed high regard for the various ways they exploited the double trio format on the album. While noting the album often referenced previous King Crimson works, he felt that this was a subtle acknowledgment of King Crimson's established fan base rather than a preoccupation with their own past.

== Track listing ==
All music written by Adrian Belew, Robert Fripp, Trey Gunn, Tony Levin, Bill Bruford and Pat Mastelotto; all lyrics written by Adrian Belew, except "Coda: Marine 475", written by Robert Fripp.

No.	Title	Length
1.	"VROOOM" (instrumental)	4:38
2.	"Coda: Marine 475"	2:42
3.	"Dinosaur"	6:37
4.	"Walking on Air"	4:38
5.	"B'Boom" (instrumental)	4:11
6.	"THRAK" (instrumental)	3:59
7.	"Inner Garden I"	1:47
8.	"People"	5:53
9.	"Radio I" (instrumental)	0:44
10.	"One Time"	5:21
11.	"Radio II" (instrumental)	1:03
12.	"Inner Garden II"	1:16
13.	"Sex Sleep Eat Drink Dream"	4:50
14.	"VROOOM VROOOM" (instrumental)	5:50
15.	"VROOOM VROOOM: Coda" (instrumental)	3:01

Notes

- "Vrooom", "Thrak" and "Vrooom Vrooom" are stylised in all caps.

== Personnel ==
King Crimson

- Adrian Belew – electric and acoustic guitars, lead vocals
- Robert Fripp – electric guitar, Mellotron, soundscapes
- Trey Gunn – Chapman Stick, backing vocals
- Tony Levin – bass guitar, electric upright bass, backing vocals
- Bill Bruford – acoustic and electronic drums, percussion
- Pat Mastelotto – acoustic and electronic drums, percussion

Additional personnel

- David Bottrill – production, engineering
- Russell Kearney – additional engineering
- David Singleton – production assistant, digital editing
- John Sinks – equipment, strategic liaison
- Richard Chadwick – coordinator
- Lewis Mulatero – photography
- Kevin Westenberg – additional photography
- Bill Smith Studio – design

== Charts ==
Chart (1995)	Peak position
Japanese Albums (Oricon)	24
Scottish Albums (Official Charts)	92
UK Albums (Official Charts)	58
US Billboard 200	83

Chart (2015)	Peak position
UK Independent Albums (Official Charts)	28
