= John Miller (Cornish artist) =

English painter

John Miller (1931–2002) was an English artist born in London who became famous for his idyllic representation of beach scenes in his home county of Cornwall. Most of his paintings were of the West Penwith peninsula and Tresco in the Isles of Scilly.

== Career ==
Following an earlier career as an architect, John Miller moved to West Cornwall in 1958 to give his life over to painting.

Miller was elected to become a member of the Newlyn Society of Artists in 1961.

During the 1970s John Miller emerged as a cultural figurehead within Cornwall. He became well known as a painter of popular, Monet-like Cornish scenes (many of which were cheaply reproduced as prints for the tourist trade), as an art teacher, a television personality, a patron of local charities and an active supporter of the Church of England. He was also responsible for some high-profile architectural projects including a reordering of the interior of Newlyn Art Gallery.

At an advanced stage in his career John Miller's artistic style underwent a radical change and by the mid-1990s his work (but not always his name) had become known worldwide as a result of the mass production and distribution of cheap posters, prints and cards with reproductions of his distinctive beach paintings: he produced the first of these in what was to become recognised as his trademark style in 1992. The beach scenes had enormous market appeal and have become firmly established as iconic images which - now much imitated - apparently spawned a genre. The paintings themselves, which Miller continued to produce in large numbers until he died in 2002, became highly sought after and were only available through selected London galleries at successive annual exhibitions which usually sold out well before their official opening dates.

== Legacy ==
John Miller, a household name in Cornwall since the mid-1970s, is an artist whose work continues to have an extremely high public profile, both in the UK and internationally. In a 2003 survey (for the periodical 'Art Business Today') of 200 United Kingdom high street gallery owners whose businesses specialized in posters and popular art reproductions, Miller was listed alongside Monet and L.S. Lowry among the ‘top-four’ best-selling landscape artists and fifth - above Van Gogh (7th), Picasso (8th), and Matisse (10th) - in a list of the current ‘top-ten’ best-selling deceased artists in all genres. During 2004-5 John Miller's work was the subject of an academic investigation by a postgraduate student at the University of Kent, Canterbury, England.

A celebratory exhibition was held in 2012 at the New Craftsman Gallery, St Ives, ten years after Miller's death.

London art dealers Messums, who exhibited Miller's work during his lifetime, now handle the Artist's Estate. A major retrospective and accompanying catalog was held in May 2021.

== Bibliography ==
- John Miller: Seeing is believing (2001), published by Truran. ISBN 1-85022-153-7
