= The Jazz Cafe =

Music venue in Camden Town, London

Jazz Cafe
- Interactive map of Jazz Cafe
- Location: 5 Parkway, Camden Town, London
- Coordinates: 51°32′20″N 0°8′36″W
- Owner: The Columbo Group
- Type: Music venue
- Events: Jazz; Electronica; Hip hop; Soul; Funk; Reggae
- Public transit: Camden Town

Construction
- Opened: 1990; 36 years ago (current site)

Website
- Official website

The Jazz Cafe is a music venue in Camden Town, London. It opened in 1990 on the former premises of a branch of Barclays Bank and has had several owners throughout its history as a music venue.

The venue holds 450 people across both floors.

The music venue also curates Jazz Cafe Festival, a London day festival which takes place in Burgess Park.

== History ==
The original Jazz Cafe was founded by Jon Dabner and Jean Marshall in the 1980s in Newington Green, Stoke Newington, and moved to Camden Town in 1990. Mean Fiddler took over bookings in 1992. In 2008 MAMA & Company acquired the Mean Fiddler Music Group and continued to operate the venue until it was purchased by The Columbo Group in January 2016, reopening with a new look, a technical upgrade, a revamped food and drink menu plus a 'reinvigorated bookings approach'. Throughout its various owners the club has continued to showcase performers from the genres of jazz, hip hop, electronica, blues, world, reggae, Latin and soul, as well as providing a venue for new and established artists.

== Performers ==
The Jazz Cafe has played host to such jazz musicians as: Jamiroquai, Sun Ra Arkestra, Pharoah Sanders, Don Cherry, Jimmy Smith, Abbey Lincoln, Ahmad Jamal, Archie Shepp, Eddie Harris, Cassandra Wilson, Mulatu Astatke, and many more too numerous to mention. It has hosted top-drawer funk, soul and disco artists such as Amy Winehouse, Ben E King, D'Angelo, Leroy Burgess, Evelyn "Champagne" King, The Blackbyrds, Jocelyn Brown, Jean Carne and The Fatback Band, plus reggae artists including Lee Scratch Perry, Yellowman, The Skatalites, Max Romeo, Luciano, Horace Andy, Johnny Osbourne and Marcia Griffiths, Italian singer-songwriter Elisa, and singer-songwriter Benedict Cork. The venue also showcases music from across Africa and Latin America.

The American soul singer Bilal played the venue on the night of 15 July 2006, amidst a period of controversy surrounding his unreleased Love for Sale album. In attendance was the American writer Tamara P. Carter, who later recounted in Wax Poetics the rousing nature of his performance, which had left her "drenched in sweat".

== See also ==
- List of restaurants in London
