= Ashbory bass =

Bass guitar

Ashbory Bass
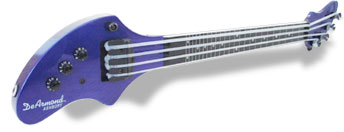
- Manufacturer: Guild Guitar Company (1986–1988); Fender (1999–2012)
- Period: 1986–1988, 1999–2012

Construction
- Body type: Solid
- Neck joint: Neck-thru
- Scale: 18"

Woods
- Body: Agathis, Guild models used poplar (one-piece neck and body)
- Neck: Agathis, Guild models used poplar (one-piece neck and body)
- Fretboard: Plastic, fretless

Hardware
- Bridge: Fixed
- Pickup(s): One active piezoelectric bridge pickup.

Colors available
- Black, Frost Red, Moon Blue

The Ashbory bass is a solid body fretless bass guitar designed by Alun Ashworth-Jones and Nigel Thornbory. It is 18 inches long, almost half the size of a standard bass guitar. When amplified, the Ashbory reproduces the low, resonant bass tone of a plucked double bass.

== History ==
The Ashbory was designed by folk musician Al Jones and luthier Nigel Thornbory. According to Thornbory, "Al discovered that a rubber band stretched over one of his guitar transducers produced an impressive bass note when plucked."

The Ashbory was produced by the Guild Guitar Company from 1986 until 1988. This version used a one-piece poplar body and neck. There was an attempt to launch a Mark II model in 1990, but it was scrapped. The Ashbory would be reintroduced in 1999 by Fender under the DeArmond name. This version was constructed using cheaper agathis wood.

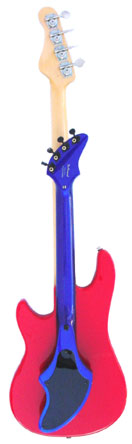
Comparison in size between an Ashbory Bass (blue) and a standard sized bass guitar.

== Features ==
The Ashbory uses silicone rubber strings and an acoustic piezo-transducer pickup fitted to the bridge to create the instrument's tone. Due to its small, fretless fingerboard, it requires considerable skill to intonate accurately. The lower string tension of the instrument means that no truss rod is required, and unlike electric basses and electric guitars, neither the bridge nor the neck is adjustable. Because of the grip of the rubber strings, it is necessary for chalk or talcum powder to be applied to the strings for playing.

== Playing styles ==
The manufacturer recommends "standard electric bass 'fingerstyle' playing", and acknowledges that electric bass techniques such as slapping and popping and pick playing do not work as well on the Ashbory. On the other hand, the Ashbory can be used to create additional sounds. By muting the strings with the left hand and using the right hand to strike the strings, an analog synth-like sound can be created. Snapping the strings with the right hand can create an upright-bass-like slap sound.
