= Trey Gunn =

American musician (born 1960)

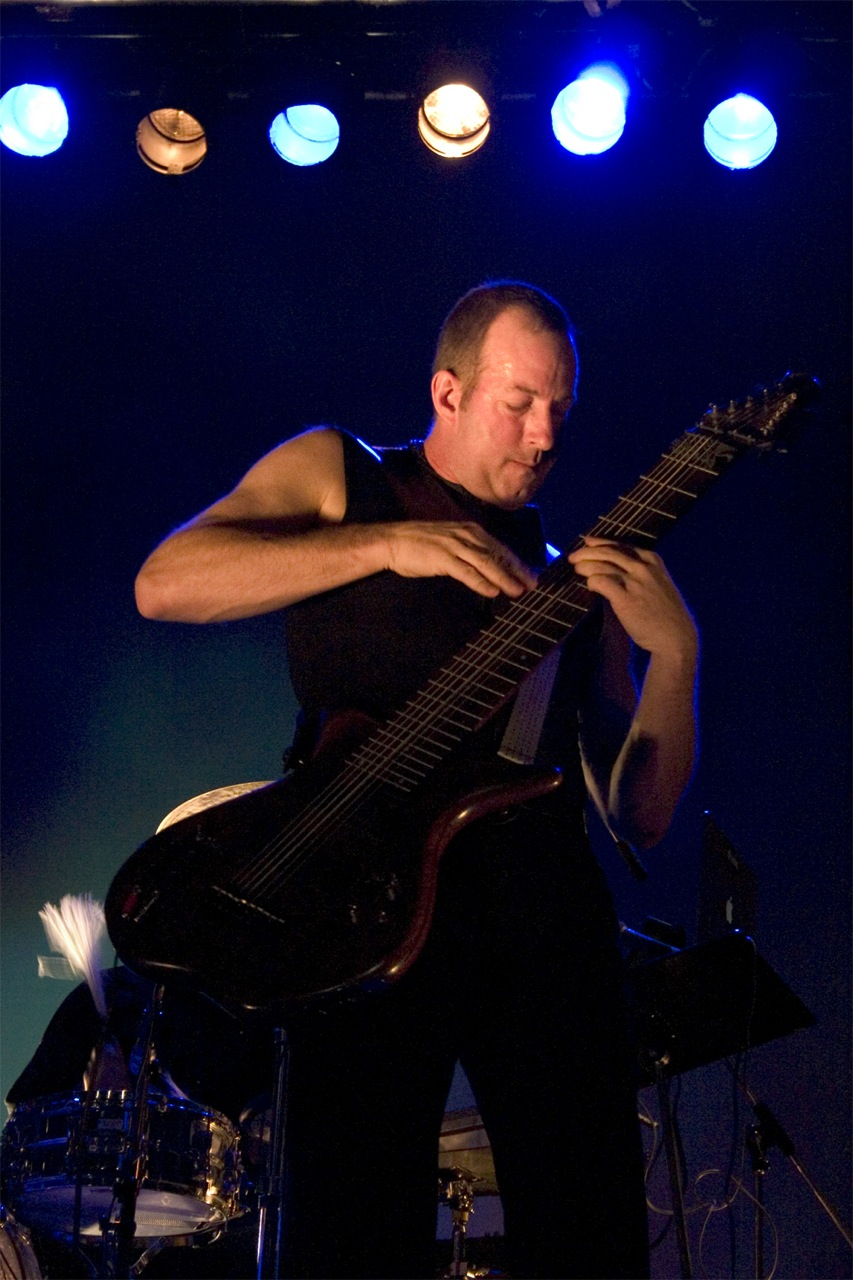
- Gunn performing in 2005

Background information
- Born: December 13, 1960 (age 65)
- Genres: Experimental, art rock, jazz fusion, progressive rock, progressive metal, world music
- Occupation: Musician
- Instruments: Warr guitar; Chapman Stick; bass guitar
- Years active: 1983–present
- Website: treygunn.com

Trey Gunn (born December 13, 1960) is an American musician, known for being in the progressive rock band King Crimson from 1994 to 2003. He plays Warr Guitar, Chapman Stick and bass guitar.

== Biography ==
A native Texan who now resides in New Mexico, Gunn began playing classical piano when he was 7. He has also played electric bass, electric and acoustic guitar, keyboards, and the touch guitar. He moved to Eugene, Oregon and played in punk bands while earning a degree in classical music composition at the University of Oregon. Next, he moved to New York City and began a professional career in music.

He was one of the initial students of Guitar Craft, founded and instructed by Robert Fripp, and appeared on several of the earliest League of Crafty Guitarists albums.

From 1988 to 1991, he played Chapman Stick in a quartet, with Toyah Willcox, Robert Fripp, and Paul Beavis, initially named "Fripp, Fripp". By the second tour it became Sunday All Over the World. They recorded and released an album in 1991 entitled Kneeling at the Shrine. In the same year, along with Beavis and Tony Geballe, he also played stick on the solo Toyah album Ophelia's Shadow, mixed by Fripp, and produced by Toyah who was to later guest on his album, The Third Star. In 1992, Gunn was asked to join David Sylvian and Robert Fripp in a collaborative project that toured the United States, Europe, and Japan. The band released The First Day and Damage–a live recording from the Royal Albert Hall in London. During that period, Gunn also recorded his first solo album (other than a few that he had self-released), One Thousand Years.

In 1992 and 1993 with Fripp, Bert Lams, Hideyo Moriya, and Paul Richards, he toured and recorded as The Robert Fripp String Quintet.

In 1994, Gunn joined King Crimson. With King Crimson he played a Chapman Stick and later diverse types of Warr guitar. He was part of the "double trio" formation opposite Tony Levin. In 1997, King Crimson fragmented into smaller configurations known as the ProjeKcts. Gunn, along with Fripp, participated in all of the ProjeKcts performances and recordings. In 1999, the group mutated into a four-piece–Belew, Fripp, Gunn, and Mastelotto. He left Crimson after "The Power to Believe" tour in 2003. Over the course of a decade with the group, he participated in thirty-three King Crimson CDs, two DVDs, and hundreds of performances.

He has also performed and recorded with a number of other musicians: Tool, Puscifer, Brian Eno, Robert Fripp, Sean Malone and Gordian Knot, David Sylvian, Vernon Reid, John Paul Jones, Eric Johnson, Jerry Marotta, Alice, Azam Ali, Matt Chamberlain, Michael Brook, Bill Rieflin, David Hykes of the Harmonic Choir and many more. He has released a number of solo albums, as Trey Gunn and as the leader of The Trey Gunn Band.

In the late 2000s, Gunn began to experience discomfort in his hands from playing the broad-necked Warr guitar in a typical slung position. In response, he switched to playing it on his lap, and he found that the piano-informed techniques enabled by this position improved his playing. According to Gunn, the Warr guitar was originally intended to be played in this fashion, but its design and promotion ultimately emphasized slung play in order to maximize its appeal to typical guitar players.

In 2003, Gunn founded the multi-media group Quodia with Joe Mendelson, in which his contributions are more vocal than instrumental. In 2004, he and Pat Mastelotto started collaborating with Kimmo Pohjonen and Samuli Kosminen, forming KTU out of their respective duos, TU and Kluster. In 2012, he began working with Jerry Marotta in the group The Security Project.

In addition to helping run the label 7d Media, he currently works as a solo artist, in film and television scoring, coaching artists in the creative process at Original Voice Coaching, and as a member of the group Tu-Ner with Pat Mastelotto and Markus Reuter.

== Discography ==
=== Solo albums ===
- Playing with Borrowed Time (1985) (cassette)
- One Thousand Years (1993)
- The Third Star (1996)
- Raw Power (1999)
- The Joy of Molybdenum (2000)
- Live Encounter (2001)
- Road Journals (CD-ROM) (2002)
- Untune The Sky (CD/DVD) (2003) (compilation)
- Music for Pictures (2008)
- Modulator (2010)
- I'll Tell What I Saw (2010) (compilation)
- The Waters, They Are Rising (2015)
- Punkt 1 (2020)
- Firma (2020)
- Life on Hisarü 9 (2020) (with Markus Reuter)

=== Score Books ===
- Trey Gunn - Scores (2014)
- King Crimson - THRAK (2017) (full band transcriptions + tabs)
- King Crimson - The Discipline Era Transcriptions (2020) (full band transcriptions + tabs)

=== With others ===
Date	Artist	Title
1991	Toyah	Ophelia's Shadow
1991	Sunday All Over the World	Kneeling at the Shrine
1993	Robert Fripp / California Guitar Trio *as Robert Fripp String Quintet	The Bridge Between
1993	David Sylvian / Robert Fripp	The First Day
1993	David Sylvian / Robert Fripp	Darshan
1994	David Sylvian / Robert Fripp	Damage: Live
1994	U. Srinivas & Michael Brook	Dream
1994	King Crimson	Vrooom
1995	King Crimson	Thrak
1995	King Crimson	B'Boom: Live in Argentina
1995	Alice	Charade
1996	King Crimson	Thrakattak
1996	Sean Malone	Cortlandt
1999	ProjeKct One	Live at the Jazz Café
1998	ProjeKct Two	Space Groove
1999	ProjeKct Two	Live Groove
1999	ProjeKct Three	Masque
1999	ProjeKct Four	West Coast Live
1999	King Crimson	Déjà Vrooom (DVD)
1999	King Crimson	The ProjeKcts (4-CD box set)
1999	King Crimson	The Deception of the Thrush
1999	Gordian Knot	Gordian Knot
1999	John Paul Jones	Zooma
1999	Bill Rieflin / Robert Fripp / Trey Gunn	Birth of a Giant
1999	Bill Rieflin / Robert Fripp / Trey Gunn	The Repercussions of Angelic Behavior
2000	ProjeKct X	Heaven and Earth
2000	King Crimson	The Construkction of Light
2000	King Crimson	Heavy ConstruKction
2000	King Crimson	Level Five
2001	King Crimson	Vrooom Vrooom
2001	Mike Brannon & Synergy	Barcodes
2002	TU (Trey Gunn & Pat Mastelotto)	Thunderbird Suite
2002	King Crimson	Happy with What You Have to Be Happy With
2003	King Crimson	The Power to Believe
2003	King Crimson	Eyes Wide Open (DVD)
2003	King Crimson	EleKtrik: Live in Japan
2003	TU (Trey Gunn & Pat Mastelotto)	TU
2004	TU (Trey Gunn & Pat Mastelotto)	Official Bootleg
2005	KTU	8 Armed Monkey
2006	Azam Ali	Elysium for the Brave
2007	Puscifer	"V" Is for Vagina
2007	Quodia	The Arrow (CD/DVD)
2007	Stretching Madness	Escape Plan
2008	The Season Standard	Squeeze Me Ahead of Line
2008	UKZ	Radiation
2009	KTU	Quiver
2009	N.y.X	Down in Shadows
2010	Inna Zhelannaya	Cocoon
2011	TU (Trey Gunn & Pat Mastelotto)	Live in Russia
2011	Steven Wilson	Grace for Drowning
2011	Morgan Ågren, Henry Kaiser, Trey Gunn	Invisible Rays
2012	The Security Project with Jerry Marotta	The Security Project with Jerry Marotta
2014	Leon Alvarado/Jerry Marotta	Music From An Expanded Universe
2014	John Crispino	Seconds Before Landing II - Seconds Before Landing
2015	King Crimson	THRAK (box set)
2015	Leon Alvarado	Persistence
2016	N.y.X	The News
2016	The Security Project	Live 1
2017	The Security Project	Live 2
2017	The Security Project	CONTACT
2018	The Deep Energy Orchestra	Playing With Fire
2019	King Crimson	Heaven & Earth (box set)
2019	King Crimson	The ReconstruKction of Light (box set)
2019	The Security Project	Slow Burn
2020	The Deep Energy Orchestra	The Return
2020	with Markus Reuter	Life on Hisarü 9
2023	with Tu-Ner (w/ Pat Mastelotto and Markus Reuter)	Contact Information
2024	with Tu-Ner (w/Pat Mastelotto and Markus Reuter)	Tu-Ner For Lovers
