= Roland V-Drums =

Brand of electronic drums

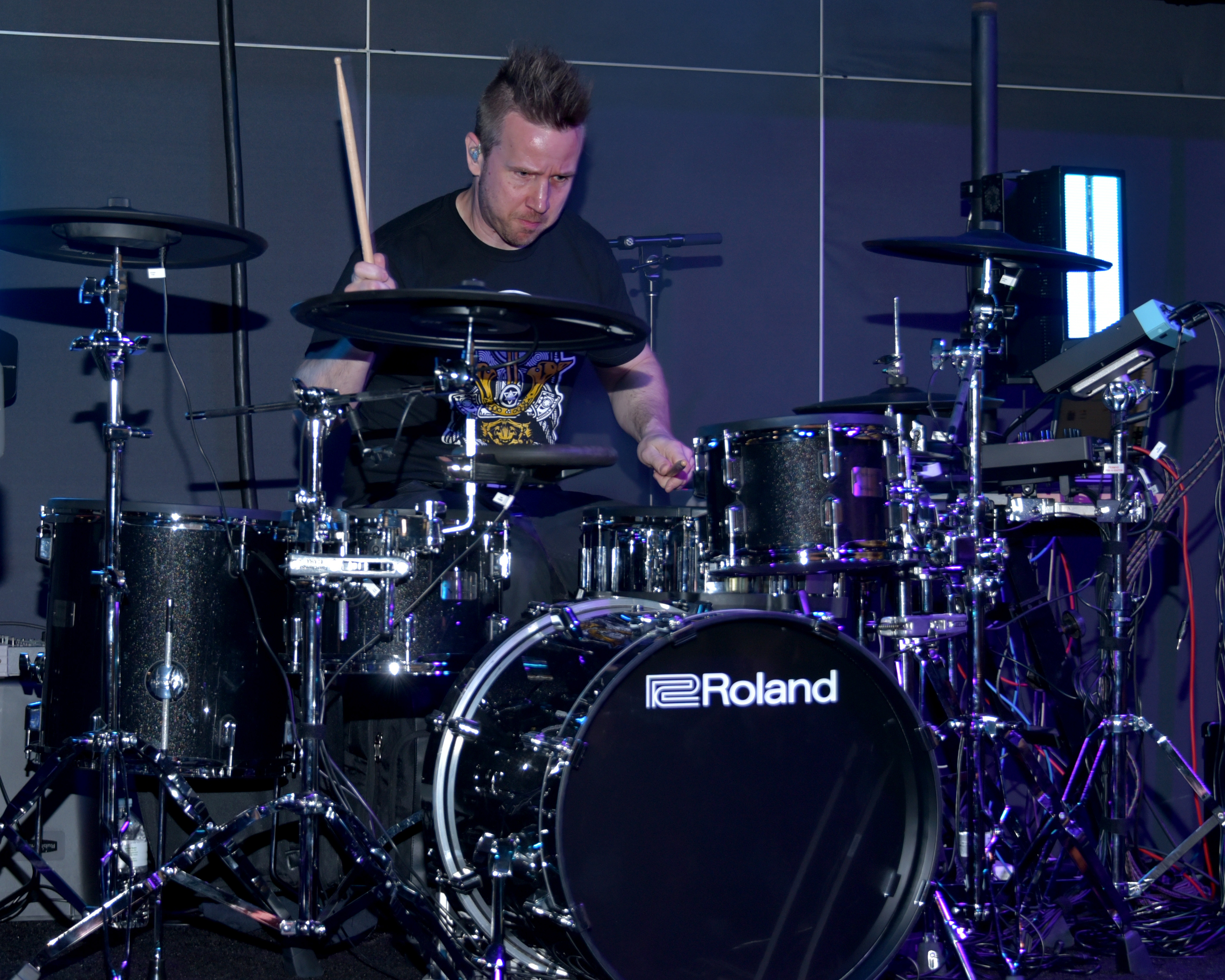
KJ Sawka playing Roland Drums at the NAMM Show January 2020

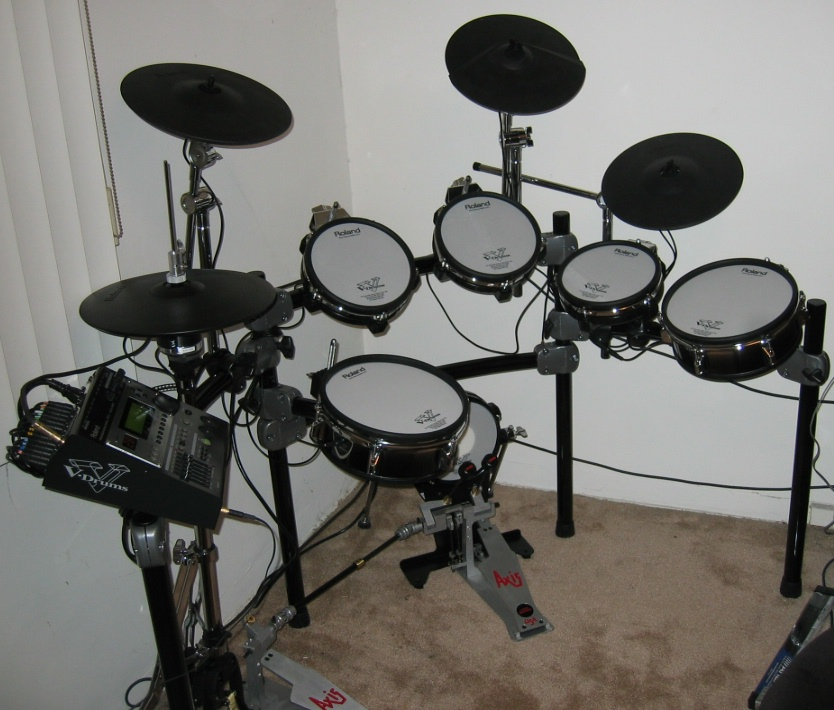
Expanded Roland TD-12S V-Stage set

V-Drums (Virtual Drums) are a line of electronic drums by Roland Corporation which were first launched in 1997.

== Trigger types ==
V-Drums trigger devices are of four major types: mesh-head drum pads, rubber pads, cymbal pads and acoustic drum triggers. Mesh-head pads look very similar to acoustic drums, and attempt to emulate their feel. The simpler, more generic type is a rubber pad, which is less expensive, but also looks and feels less like an acoustic drum. There are several models of cymbal pads (also called V-Cymbals). The more expensive ones attempt to emulate the physical properties of acoustic cymbals of various types (e.g.: hi-hat, crash, ride), while the simpler, less expensive cymbal pads are less realistic. Acoustic drum triggers can be used to provide trigger signals from standard acoustic drums.

From an electrical point of view, trigger pads can be of the following types:

- Mono pads, using one Piezoelectric sensor for the head. Usually kick-drum pads or older and less expensive pads.
- Stereo pads, using one piezo sensor for the head and an additional switch for the rim. If the rim switch is triggered, the signal strength is determined by the head's piezo sensor. Mostly rubber pads and cymbal pads.
- Stereo pads using two piezo sensors, one for the head and one for the rim. Mostly mesh-head pads.
- Three-way pads using one piezo sensor and two switches. Roland's three-way cymbal pads (CY-12R/C, CY-13R and CY-15R) work this way, the piezo triggers the bow, and the switches trigger edge and bell.
- Digital pads using multiple piezo sensors and an electrostatic sensor (similar to capacitive touchscreens in mobile devices). Onboard signal processing and USB protocol with class-compliant USB-MIDI transmitting actual GM/GS/GM2 notes and continuous controllers to the host. Can detect stick position and cross-stick, brush and hand playing for digital snares, and bow, edge and bell shots with single-touch choking for digital hi-hat and ride cymbal.

=== Rubber pads ===
Round rubber pads were introduced with the TD-7 drum module in 1992 (previous Roland pads were polygonal) and were universally used as trigger pads for drums and cymbals. Since the introduction of mesh-head drum pads and cymbal-shaped trigger pads, standard rubber pads are only used as tom-tom and (until recently) bass drum trigger pads on Roland's less expensive drum kits. More expensive kits no longer include any rubber pads.

The downsides of rubber pads are their less realistic rebound and their relatively high ambient noise level (compared to mesh-head pads), but their lower price and increased durability still makes them a better choice in some cases.

=== Cloth-head pads ===
Cloth-head drum pads were introduced with the KD-9 in 2011, using a cloth-like material as the drum head with an underlying, relatively thick layer of foam. These pads are softer than rubber pads and feel more realistic, while producing less ambient noise. However, they are only available in small sizes, and the head tension cannot be adjusted like on mesh-head pads.

=== Mesh-head pads ===
Roland V-Drums mesh-head triggers resemble acoustic drums in both appearance and feel. The striking surface is a two-layer taut woven mesh of fibers fitted with several electronic sensors. This allows the mesh-head trigger to respond to the play of a drumstick in a manner that feels more like real drums than their earlier rubber predecessors. Roland developers have stated that the design of the mesh-head V-Pad was inspired in part by a small toy trampoline.

In 1997, Roland developed and patented an updated version of mesh-head drum triggers, a key feature of the V-Drums line. As such, the name "V-Drums" sometimes refers specifically to Roland's mesh-head based drum triggers. The company began marketing the mesh-head triggers under the "V-Drums" name in 1997, in conjunction with the TD-10 drum module.

Most Roland mesh-head V-Drums have a playable rim which have their own electronic sensors (and corresponding sounds) - exceptions being the PD-100, PD-80, and mesh head drums on the HD series of kits, which only have a single head sensor. V-Drums and other electronic drum products have taken substantial market share from acoustic drums due to advances in electronic drum technology that have improved the value proposition of electronic drums over acoustic. Electronic drum kits, especially mesh-head based ones, make significantly less ambient noise than acoustic drum kits and mesh heads provide a playing feel more similar to acoustic drums than non-mesh electronic pads (typically rubber).

Mesh heads used in V-Drums kits today are made by the American drumhead company Remo.

=== Acoustic drum triggers ===
Roland also makes acoustic drum triggers, which can be mounted on the rims of standard acoustic drums to provide trigger signals from those drums, effectively turning them into trigger pads. The acoustic drumhead can either be left on the drum, to get the acoustic sound as well as a trigger signal, or the drumhead can be replaced with a mesh-head to lower ambient noise, if only the trigger signal is needed.

=== Cymbal pads ===
In the early 2000s, Roland moved away from using standard rubber pads as cymbal triggers and introduced new cymbal-shaped trigger pads with a rubber surface, which they call V-Cymbals.

The more expensive cymbal pads can swing freely after being hit (only rotation of the pad is prevented by a special cymbal mount), so they feel more like real cymbals, while the less expensive cymbal pads are not movable and always stay in their fixed position, thus feeling less realistic. Some of the movable pads also feature a third bell zone, which is triggered when hitting the bell area of the cymbal pad. These cymbal pads are called three-way cymbals because of their three trigger zones (bell, bow and edge).

=== Electronic hi-hats ===
Electronic hi-hats are always made up of two components: a trigger pad to detect hits, and a variable resistor-based hi-hat controller to detect the foot position, so the drum module can determine whether the hi-hat is supposed to be open or closed (or somewhere in between).

The simpler, less expensive solution uses a simple fixed V-Cymbal pad in combination with a separate foot pedal controller, which allows the drum module to replicate the sound of a hi-hat, but does not emulate the feel and scope of expressiveness of acoustic hi-hats.

The more expensive V-Hi-Hats integrate trigger pad and controller into a set of two opposing pieces, designed to be mounted on a conventional hi-hat stand. Because the hi-hat pad moves with the position of the pedal and can swing freely when the hi-hat is opened, this solution is more similar to a traditional acoustic hi-hat. The most complex and most expensive VH-13 V-Hi-Hat and the older VH-12 can also detect different amounts of foot pressure in the closed position, but they are only compatible with the TD-30 and the older TD-12 and TD-20 drum modules. The simpler VH-11 can be used with more modules, but it cannot sense foot pressure in the closed position.

=== Available pads ===
List of Roland pads
Pad Name	Type	Years Available	Diameter	Zones/ Channels	Trigger			Positional Sensing	Colors	Notes
Pad Name	Type	Years Available	Diameter	Zones/ Channels	Head/Bow	Rim/Edge	Bell	Positional Sensing	Colors	Notes
BT-1 In Production	Bar-shaped Rubber Pad	2013-	–	1 (Mono)	Piezo	–	–	No	Black/Gray	Needs to be connected to a stereo input, despite being a mono pad
CY-5 In Production	Cymbal Pad (fixed)	2006-	10 Inches	2 (Stereo)	Piezo	Switch	–	No	Black, White	No edge trigger on pads that shipped with the HD-1
CY-6	Cymbal Pad (fixed)	2001–2003	12 Inches	2 (Stereo)	Piezo	Switch	–	No	Black	
CY-8 In Production	Cymbal Pad (fixed)	2003-	12 Inches	2 (Stereo)	Piezo	Switch	–	No	Black	
CY-12C In Production	Cymbal Pad (movable)	2011-	12 Inches	2 (Stereo)	Piezo	Switch	–	No	Black	
CY-12H	Hi-Hat Cymbal Pad (fixed)	2000–2004	12 Inches	2 (Stereo)	Piezo	Switch	–	No	Black	
CY-12R/C In Production	Cymbal Pad (movable)	2001-	12 Inches	3 (Three-way)	Piezo	Switch	Switch	Yes	Black	
CY-12C-T In Production	Cymbal Pad (movable)	2022-	12 Inches	2 (Stereo)	Piezo	Switch	–	Yes	Black	Thinner version of CY-12C
CY-13R In Production	Cymbal Pad (movable)	2011-	13 Inches	3 (Three-way)	Piezo	Switch	Switch	Limited (TD-50, TD-30, and TD-25 only)	Black	
CY-14C In Production	Cymbal Pad (movable)	2000-	14 Inches	2 (Stereo)	Piezo	Switch	–	No	Black, Silver, Metallic Gray	
CY-14C-T In Production	Cymbal Pad (movable)	2020-	14 Inches	2 (Stereo)	Piezo	Switch	–	No	Black	Thinner version of CY-14C
CY-14R-T In Production	Cymbal Pad (movable)	2022-	14 Inches	3 (Three-way)	Piezo	Switch	Switch	Limited (TD-50, TD-30, and TD-25 only)	Black	
CY-15R In Production	Cymbal Pad (movable)	2000-	15 Inches	3 (Three-way)	Piezo	Switch	Switch	Yes	Black, Silver, Metallic Gray	
CY-16R-T In Production	Cymbal Pad (movable)	2020-	16 Inches	3 (Three-way)	Piezo	Switch	Switch	Yes	Black	Thinner, larger version of CY-15R
CY-18DR In Production	Digital Cymbal Pad (movable)	2016-	18 Inches	3 (Digital)	Digital			Yes	Black	Only compatible with the V71, V51, V31, TD-50X, TD-50, and TD-27 drum modules
KD-5	Kick Drum Pad	1994-199?	2 Inches	1 (Mono)	Piezo	–	–	No	Black	
KD-7 In Production	Kick Drum Pad	1992-	2 Inches	1 (Mono)	Piezo	–	–	No	Black	Piezo polarity can be switched
KD-8	Rubber Kick Drum Pad	2003–2011	5 Inches	1 (Mono)	Piezo	–	–	No	Black	No dynamics when connected to HD-1
KD-9	Cloth-head Kick Drum Pad	2011-2020	6 Inches	1 (Mono)	Piezo	–	–	No	Black	
KD-10 In Production	Cloth-head Kick Drum Pad	2018-	6 Inches	1 (Mono)	Piezo	–	–	No	Black	
KD-12 In Production	Cloth-head Kick Drum Pad	2024-	7.5 Inches	1 (Mono)	Piezo	–	–	No	Black	
KD-80	Mesh-head Kick Drum Pad	1999–2003	8 Inches	1 (Mono)	Piezo	–	–	No	Black, White	
KD-85 In Production	Mesh-head Kick Drum Pad	2003-	8 Inches	1 (Mono)	Piezo	–	–	No	Black, White	
KD-120	Mesh-head Kick Drum Pad	1998-2021	12 Inches	1 (Mono)	Piezo	–	–	No	Black, White, (Red), (Purple)	
KD-140 In Production	Mesh-head Kick Drum Pad	2008-	14 Inches	1 (Mono)	Piezo	–	–	No	Silver, Black Chrome	
KD-180 In Production	Cloth-head Kick Drum	2018-	18 Inches (×12 inches)	1 (Mono)	Piezo	–	–	No	Black	
KD-180L In Production	Cloth-head Kick Drum	2020-	18 Inches (×7 inches)	1 (Mono)	Piezo	–	–	No	Black	
KD-18-BK In Production	Cloth-head Kick Drum	2024-	18 Inches (×12 inches)	1 (Mono)	Piezo	–	–	No	Black	
KD-200-MS In Production	Cloth-head Kick Drum	2020-	22 Inches (×16 inches)	1 (Mono)	Piezo	–	–	No	Black	
KD-220 In Production	Cloth-head Kick Drum	2018-	22 Inches (×14 inches)	1 (Mono)	Piezo	–	–	No	Black	
KD-222 In Production	Cloth-head Kick Drum	2021-	22 Inches (×17 inches)	1 (Mono)	Piezo	–	–	No	Black	
KD-22 In Production	Cloth-head Kick Drum	2024-	22 Inches (×17 inches)	1 (Mono)	Piezo	–	–	No	Black	
KD-A22 In Production	Acoustic Kick Drum Conversion Kit, Cloth-head Kick Drum	2016-	22 Inches	1 (Mono)	Piezo	–	–	No	Black	
KT-9 In Production	Kick Trigger Pedal	2016-	–	1 (Mono)	Piezo	–	–	No	Black/Silver	
KT-10 In Production	Kick Trigger Pedal	2014-	–	1 (Mono)	Piezo	–	–	No	Silver/Black	
PD-5	Rubber Pad	1994-199?	8 Inches	1 (Mono)	Piezo	–	–	No	Black	
PD-6	Rubber Pad	2001–2003	8 Inches	1 (Mono)	Piezo	–	–	No	White	
PD-7	Rubber Pad	1992-????	7 Inches	2 (Stereo)	Piezo	Switch	–	Yes	White	Piezo polarity can be switched
PD-8 In Production	Rubber Pad	2003-	8 Inches	2 (Stereo)	Piezo	Switch	–	Yes	Black	
PD-8A In Production	Rubber Pad	2012-	8 Inches	1 (Mono)	Piezo	–	–	Yes	Black	Pad not available separately, ships with the TD-11K and TD-17K drum sets
PD-8H In Production	Mesh-head Drum Pad	2025-	8 Inches	2 (Stereo)	Piezo	Piezo	–	No (1 outer sensor)	Black	
PD-9	Rubber Pad	1994-????	10 Inches	2 (Stereo)	Piezo	Switch	–	Yes	White	Piezo polarity can be switched
PD-80	Mesh-head Drum Pad	1999–2003	8 Inches	1 (Mono)	Piezo	–	–	Yes	Black, White	
PD-80R	Mesh-head Drum Pad	1999–2003	8 Inches	2 (Stereo)	Piezo	Piezo	–	Yes	Black, White	
PD-85 In Production	Mesh-head Drum Pad	2003-	8 Inches	2 (Stereo)	Piezo	Piezo	–	Yes	Black, White	
PD-100	Mesh-head Drum Pad	1997–2003	10 Inches	1 (Mono)	Piezo	–	–	No	Black, White, Red, Purple	
PD-105 In Production	Mesh-head Drum Pad	2003-	10 Inches	2 (Stereo)	Piezo	Piezo	–	Yes	Black, (White)	
PD-105X	Mesh-head Drum Pad	2008–2012	10 Inches	2 (Stereo)	Piezo	Piezo	–	Yes	Silver	Replaceable shell wraps
PD-108 In Production	Mesh-head Drum Pad	2012-	10 Inches	2 (Stereo)	Piezo	Piezo	–	Yes	Black Chrome	Replaceable shell wraps
PD-10H In Production	Mesh-head Drum Pad	2025-	10 Inches	2 (Stereo)	Piezo	Piezo	–	No (1 outer sensor)	Black	
PD-10P In Production	Mesh-head Drum Pad	2024-	10 Inches	2 (Stereo)	Piezo	Piezo	–	Yes (3 center sensors)	Black	3 piezo sensors to provide positional sensing while eliminating hotspots.
PD-10X In Production	Mesh-head Drum Pad	2024-	10 Inches	2 (Stereo)	Piezo	Piezo	–	Yes (4 center sensors)	Black	4 piezo sensors to provide positional sensing while eliminating hotspots.
PD-120	Mesh-head Drum Pad	1997–2003	12 Inches	2 (Stereo)	Piezo	Piezo	–	Yes	Black, White, Red, Purple	
PD-125 In Production	Mesh-head Drum Pad	2003-	12 Inches	2 (Stereo)	Piezo	Piezo	–	Yes	Black, (White)	
PD-125X	Mesh-head Drum Pad	2008–2012	12 Inches	2 (Stereo)	Piezo	Piezo	–	Yes	Silver	Replaceable shell wraps; Also available as PD-125XS for snare stands (without rack mount)
PD-128 In Production	Mesh-head Drum Pad	2012-	12 Inches	2 (Stereo)	Piezo	Piezo	–	Yes	Black Chrome	Replaceable shell wraps; Also available as PD-128S for snare stands (without rack mount)
PD-12X In Production	Mesh-head Drum Pad	2024-	12 Inches	2 (Stereo)	Piezo	Piezo	–	Yes (4 center sensors)	Black	4 piezo sensors to provide positional sensing while eliminating hotspots.
PD-12P In Production	Mesh-head Drum Pad	2024-	12 Inches	2 (Stereo)	Piezo	Piezo	–	Yes (3 center sensors)	Black	3 piezo sensors to provide positional sensing while eliminating hotspots.
PD-140DS In Production	Digital Mesh-head Drum Pad	2016-	14 Inches	2 (Digital)	Digital		–	Yes (1 center, 3 outer sensors)	Silver	Only compatible with the V71, V51, V31, TD-50X, TD-50, and TD-27 drum modules
PD-14DSX In Production	Digital Mesh-head Drum Pad	2024-	14 Inches	2 (Digital)	Digital		–	Yes (1 center, 3 outer sensors)	Silver	Updated version of PD-140DS with a lower rim height and a strainer lever, tune knob, and button
PDA100	Mesh-head Drum Pad In Production	2020	10 Inches	2 (Stereo)	Piezo	Piezo	–	No (1 outer sensor)	Black, White, Red, Natural, Brown Walnut	
PDA100L	Mesh-head Drum Pad In Production	2020	10 Inches	2 (Stereo)	Piezo	Piezo	–	No (1 outer sensor)	Black	
PDA120	Mesh-head Drum Pad In Production	2020	12 Inches	2 (Stereo)	Piezo	Piezo	–	No (3 outer sensors)	Black, White, Red, Natural, Brown Walnut	
PDA120L	Mesh-head Drum Pad In Production	2020	12 Inches	2 (Stereo)	Piezo	Piezo	–	No (3 outer sensors)	Black	Also available as PD-120LS for snare stands (without rack mount)
PDA140F	Mesh-head Drum Pad In Production	2020	14 Inches	2 (Stereo)	Piezo	Piezo	–	No (3 outer sensors)	Black, White, Red, Natural, Brown Walnut	
PDX-6 In Production	Mesh-head Drum Pad	2006-	8 Inches (6 inch head)	2 (Stereo)	Piezo	Piezo	–	No	Black	
PDX-8 In Production	Mesh-head Drum Pad	2006-	10 Inches (8 inch head)	2 (Stereo)	Piezo	Piezo	–	No	Black	No rim trigger on pads that shipped with the HD-1
PDX-12 In Production	Mesh-head Drum Pad	2018-	12 Inches	2 (Stereo)	Piezo	Piezo	–	No	Black	
PDX-100 In Production	Mesh-head Drum Pad	2012-	10 Inches	2 (Stereo)	Piezo	Piezo	–	Yes	Black	
RT-3T	Acoustic Tom-Tom Drum Trigger	2003–2006	–	1 (Mono)	Piezo	–	–	No	Silver	
RT-5S	Acoustic Snare Drum Trigger	2003–2006	–	2 (Stereo)	Piezo	Piezo	–	No	Silver	
RT-7K	Acoustic Kick Drum Trigger	2003–2006	–	1 (Mono)	Piezo	–	–	No	Silver	
RT-10K	Acoustic Kick Drum Trigger	2006–2015	–	1 (Mono)	Piezo	–	–	No	Black	
RT-10S	Acoustic Snare Drum Trigger	2006–2015	–	2 (Stereo)	Piezo	Piezo	–	No	Black	
RT-10T	Acoustic Tom-Tom Drum Trigger	2006–2015	–	1 (Mono)	Piezo	–	–	No	Black	
RT-30H In Production	Acoustic Drum Trigger	2015-	–	1 (Mono)	Piezo	–	–	No	Black	
RT-30HR In Production	Acoustic Drum Trigger	2015-	–	2 (Stereo)	Piezo	Piezo	–	No	Black	
RT-30K In Production	Acoustic Kick Drum Trigger	2015-	–	1 (Mono)	Piezo	–	–	No	Black	
VH-10 In Production	Integrated Hi-Hat Cymbal Pad and Controller (movable)	2018-	12 Inches	2 (Stereo)	Piezo	Switch	–	No	Black	
VH-11 In Production	Integrated Hi-Hat Cymbal Pad and Controller (movable)	2005-	12 Inches	2 (Stereo)	Piezo	Switch	–	No	Black	Only limited support of controller part by some drum modules (see list of hi-hat controllers below)
VH-12	Integrated Hi-Hat Cymbal Pad and Controller (movable)	2004–2012	12 Inches	2 (Stereo)	Piezo	Switch	–	No	Black, Silver	Controller part only compatible with the V71, V51, V31, TD-50X, TD-50, TD-27, TD-30, TD-20 and TD-12 drum modules
VH-13 In Production	Integrated Hi-Hat Cymbal Pad and Controller (movable)	2012-	12 Inches	2 (Stereo)	Piezo	Switch	–	No	Metallic Gray	Controller part only compatible with the V71, V51, V31, TD-50X, TD-50, TD-27, TD-30, TD-20 and TD-12 drum modules
VH-14D In Production	Digital Hi-Hat Cymbal Pad and Controller (movable)	2021-	14 Inches	2 (Digital)	Digital		–	Yes	Black	Only compatible with the V71, V51, V31, TD-50X, TD-50, and TD-27 drum modules

== Roland drum modules ==
As of 2026, Roland drum modules range in features and price from the top-of-the-line V71 to advanced V51, mid-level V31, entry-level TD-07, and small/portable TD-02. Higher model numbers denote more advanced models, while lower numbers are used for less expensive ones.

=== Available drum modules ===
List of Roland Drum Modules
Drum Module		Years Available	Drum Kits	Instruments		Trigger Inputs							Outputs^{[d]}		MIDI	Voices (Polyphony)	Features/Notes		
Drum Module		Years Available	Drum Kits	Drum	Backing	TOTAL^{[i]}	MONO	STEREO			THREE- WAY^{[b]}	DIGITAL^{[i]}	Stereo Pairs	Single Channel	MIDI	Voices (Polyphony)	Positional Sensing	Training features	Other
Drum Module		Years Available	Drum Kits	Drum	Backing	TOTAL^{[i]}	MONO	mono/ mono^{[a]}	piezo/ switch	piezo/ piezo	THREE- WAY^{[b]}	DIGITAL^{[i]}	Stereo Pairs	Single Channel	MIDI	Voices (Polyphony)	Positional Sensing	Training features	Other
HD-1 Superseded by HD-3		2007–2012	10	70	–	7 (+ Kick)	7	–	–	–	–	–	1	–	Out	?	No		Module not sold separately
HD-3		2012–2018	20	?	–	7 (+ Kick)	3	–	3	1	–	–	1	–	Out	?	No		Module not sold separately
TD-1 Superseded by TD-02		2014–2023	15	?	–	9	4	–	4	1	–	–	1 & USB	–	USB	?	No	Coach modes	Module not sold separately
TD-02 In Production		2023-	16	?	–	9	4	–	4	1	–	–	1 & USB	–	USB	?	No	Coach modes	Module not sold separately
TD-3 Superseded by TD-4		2004–2009	32	114	–	9	4	–	4	1	–	–	1	–	In/out	32?	No	Coach modes	
TD-4 (Partially superseded by TD-11)		2009–2012; 2012-2016	25	125	–	9	4	–	4^{[b]}	1	–^{[b]}	–	1	–	Out	?	No	Coach modes	Module was briefly out of production in 2012, TD-4KP cable only allows up to 8 pads
TD-5		1994–2001	32	210	–	8	–	–	8	–	–	–	1	–	In/out	14	No		
TD-6	TD-6; Superseded by TD-6V	2001–2003	99	1024	262	9 (11^{[a]})	1	2	5	1	–	–	1	–	In/out	64	No		
TD-6	TD-6V; Superseded by TD-9	2003–2008	99	1024	262	9 (11^{[a]})	1	0–2^{[c]}	5–7^{[c]}	1	–	–	1	–	In/out	64	No		
TD-7		1992–1999	32	256 (512)		9	–	–	9	–	–	–	1	2	In/out	14	No		
TD-07 In Production		2020-	25	143		10	4	–	5	1	1^{[b]}	–	1 & USB	–	USB, Bluetooth	?	No	Coach modes	One extra stereo input for a second crash or a three-zone ride.
TD-8 Superseded by TD-12		1999–2005	64	1024	262	10 (12^{[a]})	–	2	7	1	–	–	2	–	In/out	64	Yes		
TD-9	TD-9; Updated to TD-9 v2.0	2008–2011	50	522	?	10	1	–	3	5	1^{[b]}	–	1	–	In/out	?	No	Scope mode	USB Port (for USB Memory)^{[f]}
TD-9	TD-9 v2.0 Superseded by TD-15	2011–2012	99	552	?	10	1	–	3	5	1^{[b]}	–	1	–	In/out	?	No	Scope mode	TD-9 Firmware Update, also adds support for MP3 backing tracks
TD-10	TD-10; Updated with TDW-1	1997–2000	50	600	54	12	–	–	11	1	–	–	4	–	In/out	56	Yes		Proprietary Memory Card Slot^{[e]}
TD-10	TD-10 with TDW-1; Superseded by TD-20	2000–2004	100	960	54	12	–	–	11	1	–	–	4	–	In/out	56	Yes		Proprietary Memory Card Slot^{[e]}
TD-11 Superseded by TD-17		2012–2018	50	190	–	9	1	–	3	4	1^{[b]}	–	1 & USB	–	Out, USB^{[g]}	?	No	Coach modes	Two USB ports: 1x PC (MIDI^{[g]}/Audio) 1x Memory^{[f]}
TD-12 Superseded by TD-30		2005–2012	50	560	262	11	–	–	4	6	1^{[b]}	–	1	2	In/out	64	Yes		
TD-15 Superseded by TD-25		2012–2015	100	500	–	10	1	–	3	5	1^{[b]}	–	1 & USB	–	Out, USB^{[g]}	?	No	Coach modes, DT-1 Tutor interface	Two USB ports: 1x PC (MIDI^{[g]}/Audio), 1x Memory^{[f]}
TD-17 Superseded by V31		2018-2025	70+30	310	–	10	1	–	3	5	1^{[b]}	–	1 & USB	–	Out, USB^{[g]}	?	No		SD card Slot, can trigger WAV samples, available as TD-17 with Bluetooth or TD-17-L without Bluetooth
TD-20	TD-20; Updated with TDW-20 / Superseded by TD-20X	2004–2008	50	560	262	15	–	–	6^{[b]}	9	1^{[b]}	–	3	4	In/out	64	Yes		CompactFlash Slot^{[e]}
TD-20	TD-20 with TDW-20 or TD-20X; Superseded by TD-30	2008–2012	100	920	262	15	–	–	6^{[b]}	9	1^{[b]}	–	3	4	In/out	64	Yes		CompactFlash Slot^{[e]}
TD-25 Superseded by TD-27		2015–2020	18+18	233	–	10	1	–	3	5	1^{[b]}	–	1 & USB	–	Out, USB^{[g]}	?	Yes	"Time Check" from Coach mode	Two USB ports: 1x PC (MIDI^{[g]}/Audio), 1x Memory^{[f]}
TD-27 Superseded by V51		2020-2025	100	728	–	12	1	–	3	7	1^{[b]}	3^{[i]}	2 & USB & Bluetooth	–	In/out, USB^{[g]}, Bluetooth	?	Yes	Coach Modes	USB port (MIDI^{[g]}/Audio), SD Card Slot, can trigger WAV samples
TD-30 Superseded by TD-50		2012–2016	100	1100	262	15	–	–	6^{[b]}	9	1^{[b]}	–	3 & USB	4	In/out, USB^{[g]}	64	Yes		Two USB ports: 1x PC (MIDI^{[g]}/Audio), 1x Memory^{[f]}
TD-50	TD-50; Can be updated to TD-50X; superseded by V71	2016–2024	100 (55+45)	422	–	14	1	–	3	9	1^{[b]}	3^{[i]}	4 & USB	4	In/out, USB^{[g]}	?	Yes	Coach modes	SD card slot
TD-50	TD-50X; Superseded by V71	2021–2024	100 (70+30)	961	–	14	1	–	3	9	1^{[b]}	3^{[i]}	4 & USB	4	In/out, USB^{[g]}	?	Yes	Coach modes	SD card slot
V31 In Production		2025-	200 (70+130)	1000+	–	10	1	–	3	5	1^{[b]}	1^{[i]}	1 & USB	–	In/out, USB^{[g]}	?	Yes	Coach modes	SD card Slot
V51 In Production		2025-	200 (70+130)	1000+	–	12	1	–	3	7	1^{[b]}	3^{[i]}	2 & USB	–	In/out, USB^{[g]}	?	Yes	Coach modes	SD card Slot
V71 In Production		2024-	200 (70+130)	1000+	–	14	1	–	3	9	1^{[b]}	3^{[i]}	4 & USB	4	In/out, USB^{[g]}	?	Yes	Coach modes	SD card Slot
TM-2 In Production		2014-	99	>100	–	2 (4^{[h]})	–	–	–	2^{[h]}	_	–	1	–	In/out	?	No		SD card slot, can trigger WAV samples
TM-6 Pro In Production		2018-	WAV samples			6	6	–	–	–	–	–	1	4	In/out	?	No		SD card slot, can trigger WAV samples and play back song Audio (WAV/MP3)
TMC-6 Discontinued		2002–2015	–			6	–	–	5^{[b]}	1	–^{[b]}	–	–	–	Out	–	No		Trigger-to-MIDI converter
a Two Mono pads can be connected to Mono/Mono inputs by using an insert cable (Tom2/Aux and Tom3/4 inputs on the TD-6, Kick1/2 and Aux1/2 inputs on the TD-8). b Three-way (piezo/switch/switch) inputs can be used to connect a three-way cymbal like the CY-12R/C, CY-13R or CY-15R, or one non-three-way pad. On the TD-4, TD-10 with TDW-1, TD-20, TD-30 and TMC-6, three-way cymbals can be connected using two designated Piezo/Switch inputs. Connecting them to any two stereo inputs on any module works with some limitations and is not officially supported. c On The TD-6V, two stereo inputs (Tom2/Aux and Tom3/4) can be configured to be either mono/mono inputs or piezo/switch inputs. d Outputs excluding the headphone jack. e Memory card slots can only be used to store module settings. f USB Memory can only be used for wav/mp3 backing tracks, recording to MIDI files and to store module settings. The TD-9 writes proprietary MIDI files and the TD-9 v1.x only supports WAV backing tracks. g MIDI In/out is available through USB. h On the TM-2, the inputs can also be configured to be mono/mono inputs, allowing up to two pads per input by using an insert cable. i Enabling a digital trigger input disables an analog trigger input.
