= Discipline Global Mobile =

Record label

- Founded: 1992; England
- Founder: Robert Fripp
- Distributors: Physically: Panegyric (Europe); Inner Knot (US); DGM Japan (Japan); Digitally: Aviator Management
- Location: Salisbury, England
- Official website: dgmlive.com

Discipline Global Mobile (DGM, or Discipline GM) is an independent record label founded in 1992 by Robert Fripp (best known as guitarist and main composer for the band King Crimson) and producer/online content developer David Singleton. DGM has released solo music by Fripp as well as work by various affiliated musicians and bands including King Crimson, The Vicar, the California Guitar Trio and others. The label has offices in Salisbury, England, and Los Angeles, California.

DGM has aimed to be "a model of ethical business in an industry founded on exploitation, oiled by deceit, riven with theft and fueled by greed," according to Fripp. Its policy is that its artists retain all copyrights; consequently, even DGM's corporate logo is owned by its designer. The label was an early adopter of the digital download system. DGM's aims have been hailed as "exemplary", and the label has been credited with having expanded "the possibilities of experimental music" and having improved the environment for King Crimson.

The DGM label name is derived from the title of a 1981 King Crimson album (Discipline) and from the name of Singleton's previous recording business (The Mobile). The label logo also partly reflects the artwork for the Discipline album (featuring a new but similar knotwork commissioned from the artist Steve Ball).

== Foundation and business aims ==
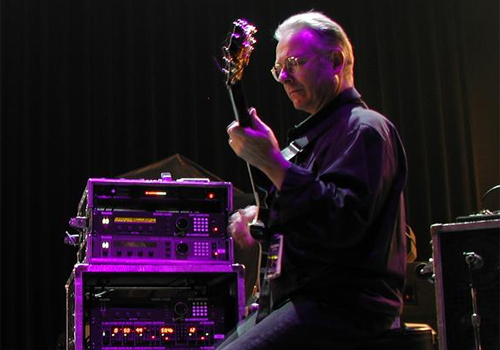
The founder of Discipline Global Mobile, Robert Fripp has called music "an industry founded on exploitation, oiled by deceit, riven with theft and fueled by greed".

Having been a professional musician since the mid-1960s (and the guitarist for King Crimson since 1969), by the late 1980s Robert Fripp found himself in conflict with his longtime record label E.G. Records and management company (E.G. Management) over royalties allegedly owed by E.G. to himself and to other band members. During this period, Fripp met and began working with producer and online developer David Singleton, initially on a Guitar Craft tour in 1990 and subsequently on the production of two albums – the League of Crafty Guitarists' Show of Hands and the eponymous album for the Fripp-and-Toyah-fronted group Sunday All Over the World. Fripp and Singleton's production partnership was sealed by work on two King Crimson boxed sets (1991's Frame by Frame and 1992's The Great Deceiver) and continues to the present day under the name of TonProb.

After seven years, Fripp and E.G. reached a settlement but the experience left Fripp determined to take control of his own work and financial affairs wherever possible. As part of this aim, he founded Discipline Global Mobile (DGM) as an independent music label in 1992, as a fifty-fifty partnership with Singleton.

DGM's mission statement consists of five "DGM business aims", as follows:

- "The first aim of DGM is to help bring music into the world which would otherwise be unlikely to do so, or under conditions prejudicial to the music and / or musicians.",
- "The second aim of DGM is to operate in the market place, while being free of the values of the market place."
- "The third aim of DGM is to help the artists and staff of DGM achieve what they wish for themselves."
- "The fourth aim of DGM is to find its audience."
- "The fifth aim of DGM is to be a model of ethical business in an industry founded on exploitation, oiled by deceit, riven with theft and fueled by greed."

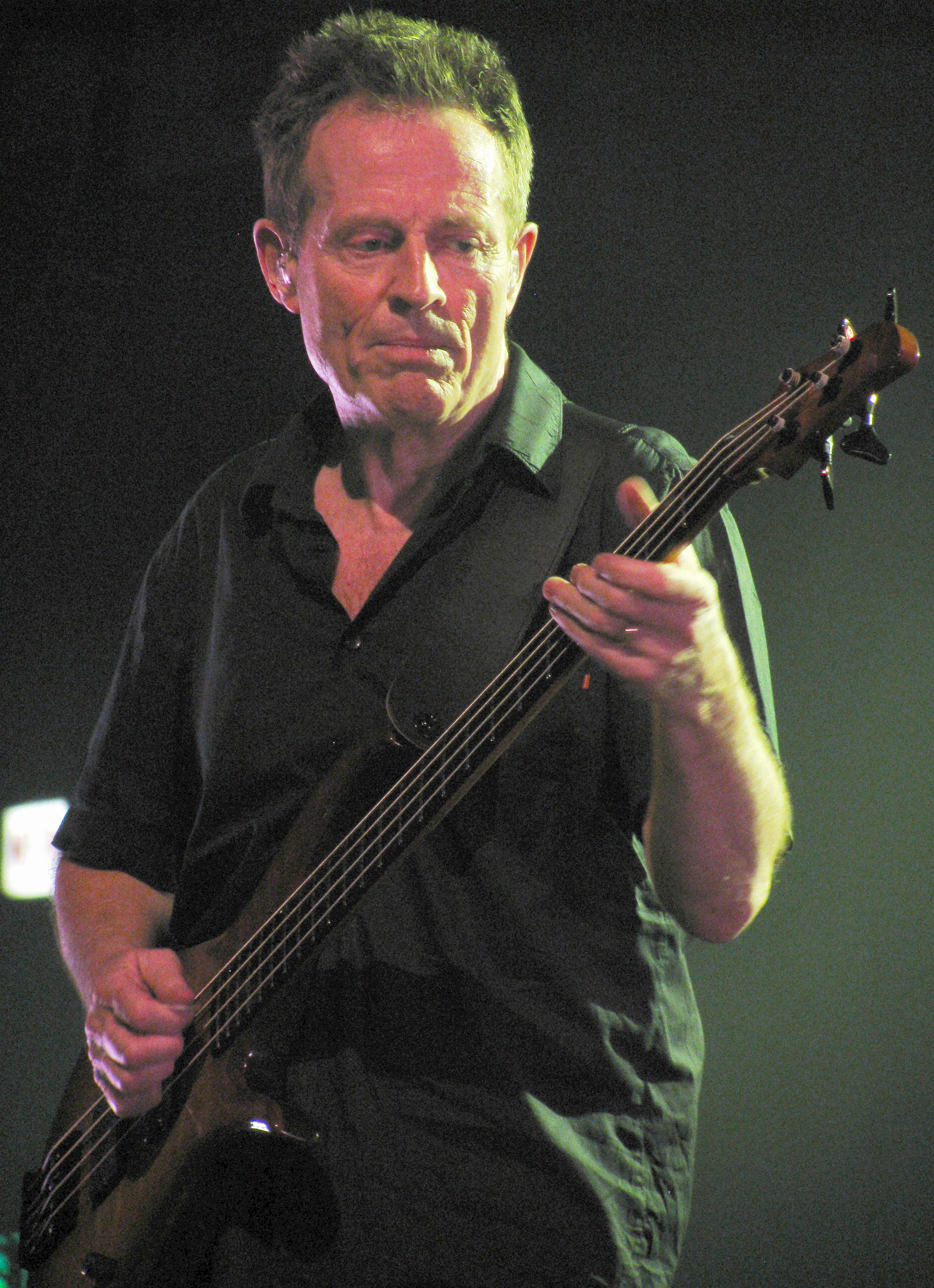
Formerly the bass guitarist of Led Zeppelin, John Paul Jones has recorded albums with DGM without signing a contract, stating that the relationship "is pure trust".

These aims were called "exemplary" by Bill Martin, who wrote that "Fripp has done something very important for the possibilities of experimental music" in creating DGM, and that DGM "has played a major role in creating favorable conditions for" King Crimson.

Since at least the early 1960s, the recording industry has required artists to sign over copyrights and moral rights to their cover art, music, and lyrics. DGM rejects this practice, and since its 1992 founding has maintained its policy that its artists retain the copyrights and the moral rights to their works, be those works musical or visual art. Fripp wrote,

"The phonographic copyright in these performances is operated by Discipline Global Mobile on behalf of the artists, with whom it resides, contrary to common practice in the record industry. Discipline accepts no reason for artists to assign the copyright interests in their work to either record company or management by virtue of a 'common practice' which was always questionable, often improper, and is now indefensible."

This extends even to DGM's knotwork corporate logo, the copyright of which is owned not by the company, but by its designer, Steve Ball.

DGM does not require that its artists sign written contracts. Former Led Zeppelin bassist John Paul Jones said, "It's pure trust," and noted that "there are dangers on both sides. I could have a successful album and just sign with a major, or they could decide not to pay me." Jones explained that he was accustomed to "working in situations that do rely on trust and integrity, those old-fashioned words" because Led Zeppelin had no contract with its manager. Another DGM band, alternative rock group The Rosenbergs, opted to work with the label following conflicts with their previous label Universal Records, which had even demanded control of the band's domain name: in contrast, DGM had encouraged them to retain control of their own master recordings and provided them with funds for touring and promoting their album.

Royalties are paid above the prevailing rate, as announced at DGM's launch. In return, DGM artists are responsible for promoting their albums through concert tours and interviews.

== Artists and back catalogue ==
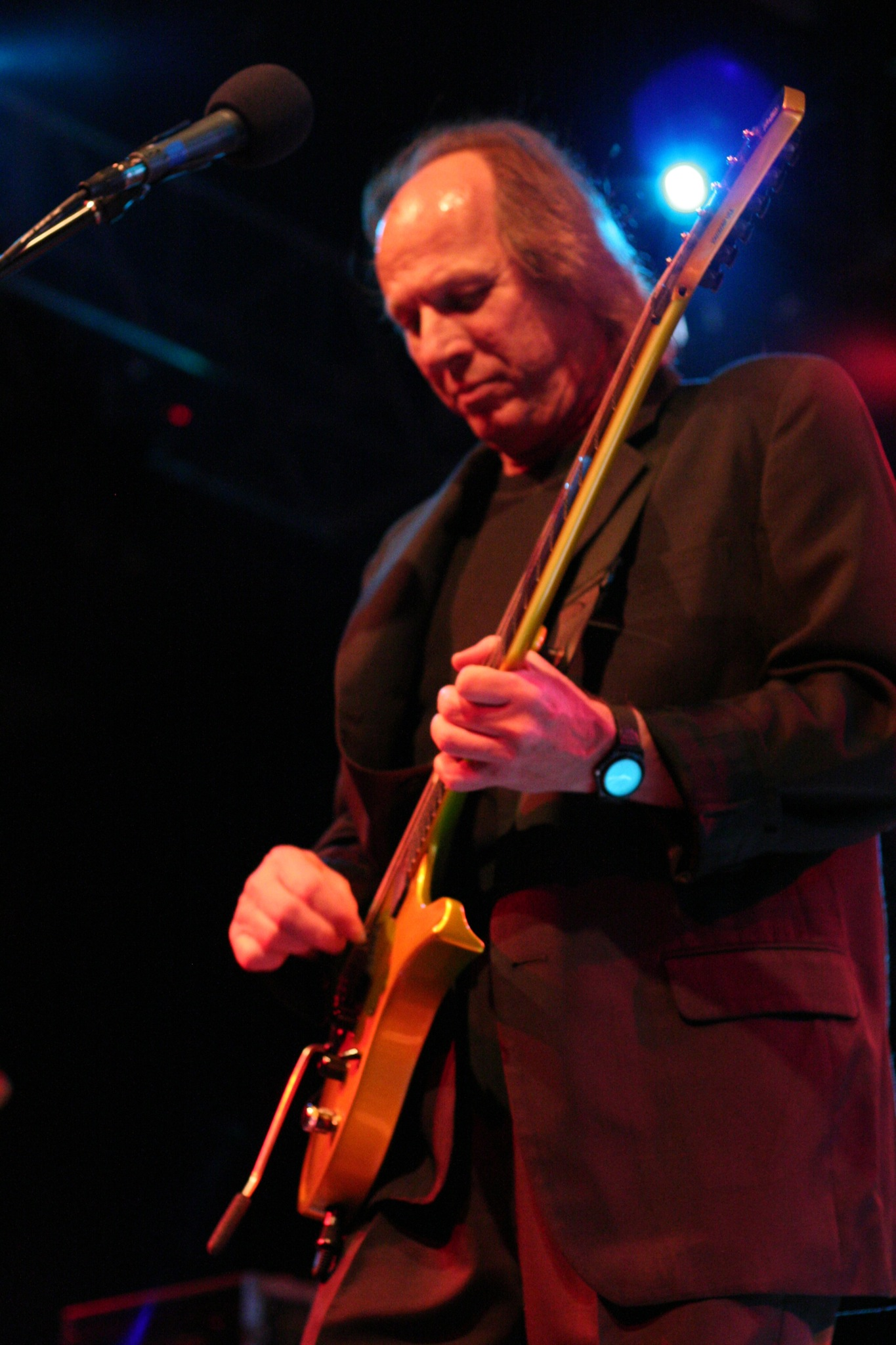
King Crimson guitarist Adrian Belew has recorded several albums with DGM.

Discipline Global Mobile specializes in art rock, progressive rock, jazz, and assorted experimental and crossover music (the label has also released recordings of Renaissance lute music and mainstream alternative rock). DGM has released more than a hundred King Crimson recordings, including remastered albums with bonus tracks and DVDs with archival footage. In addition to King Crimson, DGM's current active roster includes assorted Robert Fripp projects and The Vicar (a songwriter project). The label has previously released music by various Fripp-affiliated ensembles; The League of Crafty Guitarists, Los Gauchos Alemanes, the California Guitar Trio and the Robert Fripp String Quartet (all of which stem from or are connected with Fripp's Guitar Craft courses)

=== Current/recent DGM artists ===
- King Crimson (over 100 releases of archive material and additional releases outside of current major-label product)
- The ProjeKcts (King Crimson subgroups)
- Robert Fripp (solo releases, Soundscape recordings)
- Fripp & Eno
- The Vicar
- David Sylvian & Robert Fripp (reissues)
- Jakszyk, Fripp & Collins

=== Past DGM artists ===
- Adrian Belew
- BPM&M
- Bill Bruford (with Ralph Towner & Eddie Gomez)
- Bill Bruford's Earthworks
- Bruford Levin Upper Extremities
- California Guitar Trio
- Europa String Choir
- Robert Fripp String Quintet
- Tony Geballe
- Gitbox
- Trey Gunn
- Peter Hammill
- Steve Hancoff
- Jacob Heringman
- John Paul Jones
- Tony Levin
- Los Gauchos Alemanes
- Mr McFall's Chamber
- Bill Nelson
- Opus 20
- Juan Carlos Quintero
- The Rosenbergs
- Ten Seconds

== Mail-order and on-line services ==
According to a 1998 profile in Billboard magazine, Discipline Global Mobile had seven staff members in Salisbury, England, and three in Los Angeles, California. DGM "is actually housed in a dull pebbledash building in a village near Salisbury, south-west England".

Its label manager reported that the country with the largest market was Japan, where mail-orders accounted for only 10% of sales, but 50% of profits. In 1998, DGM was distributed in Japan by Pony Canyon; in the United Kingdom by Pinnacle; and in the United States by Rykodisc. Sound samples have been offered in addition to DGM's mail-order services. Free downloads from DGM have strengthened the relations between artists and fans.

In 2012, DGM's site had the following introduction: "The aim of DGM is to connect music, musician and audience in a way that supports the power of music, the integrity of the musician and the needs of the audience. DGM Live offers music for download with photographs, diary archives and audience commentary for browsing". DGM's successful transition to an age of digital distribution was called "unique" among music labels in 2009; this success was credited to its provision of legal, high-quality recordings of concerts, which effectively reverse-engineered the distribution-networks for unlicensed recordings ("bootlegs") of concerts.

DGM publishes on-line diaries by Robert Fripp and David Singleton. A moderated forum allows fans to ask questions or to leave comments. Together, the diaries and the fan forum display delayed dialogs in which the artists and fans discuss diary-entries and forum-postings. Fripp's public writing of his diary has challenged his readers to become more active listeners and intelligent participants in performances of music.

=== Conflict with Grooveshark ===
Fripp's diaries were internationally discussed following his publication of documents from a dispute with Grooveshark, an on-line distributor of music. Fripp and Singleton complained that Grooveshark had been continuing to distribute his music, even after repeated takedown notices and other complaints. Their correspondence with Grooveshark was published by Digital Music News and in his DGM diary. Fripp's exchange with Grooveshark was included in a suit against Grooveshark by Universal Music Group, which was filed in November 2011.

== See also ==
- Lists of record labels
- P. J. Crook (Painter owning copyrights to album covers)
