= Warr Guitar =

American-made touch guitar

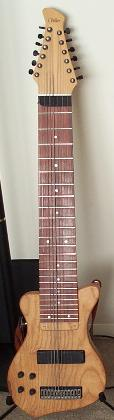
- 12-string Warr 'Raptor' model (discontinued) with typical hands-crossed tuning.

String instrument
- Classification: String
- Hornbostel–Sachs classification: 321.322 (Composite chordophone)
- Inventor: Mark Warr
- Developed: 1991

Related instruments
- Touch guitar; Chapman stick

Musicians
- Trey Gunn; Colin Marston

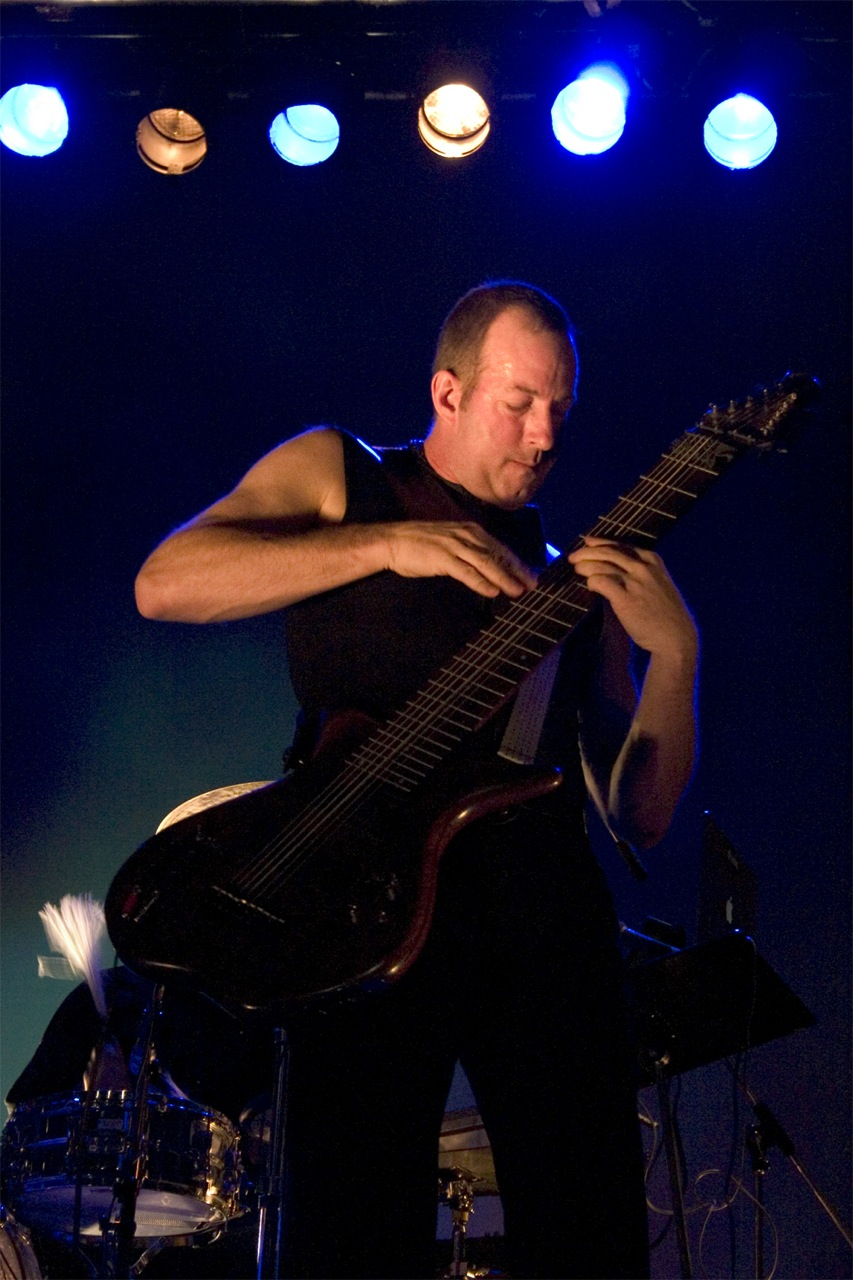
Trey Gunn playing a Warr Guitar at Tampere Jazz Happening 2005

The Warr Guitar is an American-made touch guitar, a type of instrument that combines both bass and melodic strings on a single fretboard. Invented by Mark Warr, a musician from Thousand Oaks, California, it is related to the Chapman Stick, another two-handed tapping instrument. The Warr guitar is designed for either two-handed tapping or strumming. It has between seven and 14 strings.

Well-known Warr guitar players include Trey Gunn and Colin Marston.
