= A Beginners' Guide to the King Crimson Collectors' Club =

Compilation album by King Crimson
- Released: 2000
- Recorded: 1969–1998
- Genre: Progressive rock
- Length: 59:07
- Label: Discipline Global Mobile
- Producer: Robert Fripp and David Singleton

King Crimson chronology
The Deception of the Thrush: A Beginners' Guide to ProjeKcts (1999)	A Beginners' Guide to the King Crimson Collectors' Club (2000)	The ConstruKction of Light (2000)

Professional ratings
Review scores
Source	Rating
Allmusic	3/5 stars

A Beginners' Guide to the King Crimson Collectors' Club is a 2000 album by the English progressive rock band King Crimson, compiled from King Crimson Collectors' Club albums - limited release live recordings of concert performances, studio sessions and radio sessions.

== Track listing ==
1. "21st Century Schizoid Man" (Fripp, McDonald, Lake, Giles, Sinfield) - 8:02
  from the album Live in Central Park, NYC
2. "I Talk to the Wind" (McDonald, Sinfield) - 4:45
  from the album Live at the Marquee
3. "Larks' Tongues in Aspic (Part I)" (Cross, Fripp, Wetton, Bruford, Muir) - 5:59
  from the album The Beat Club, Bremen
4. "Ladies of the Road" (Fripp, Sinfield) - 5:58
  from the album Live at Jacksonville
5. "Sailor's Tale" (Fripp) - 5:18
  from the album Live at Summit Studios
6. "Thela Hun Ginjeet" (Belew, Fripp, Levin, Bruford) - 5:46
  from the album Live at Moles Club, Bath
7. "Elephant Talk" (Belew, Fripp, Levin, Bruford) - 5:00
  from the album Live at Cap D'Agde
8. "People" (Belew, Fripp, Gunn, Levin, Bruford, Mastelotto) - 6:01
  from the album On Broadway
9. "Funky Jam" (Belew, Fripp, Gunn, Levin, Bruford, Mastelotto) - 4:29
  from the album The VROOOM Sessions
10. "Seizure" (Fripp, Gunn, Levin, Mastelotto) - 7:49
  - Performed by ProjeKct Four
  from the album Live in San Francisco: The Roar of P4

== Notes ==
Record Store Day release.
Issued in a regular jewel case with dark grey tray.
There is no barcode on this release.
