= King Crimson discography =

Cataloguing of published recordings by King Crimson

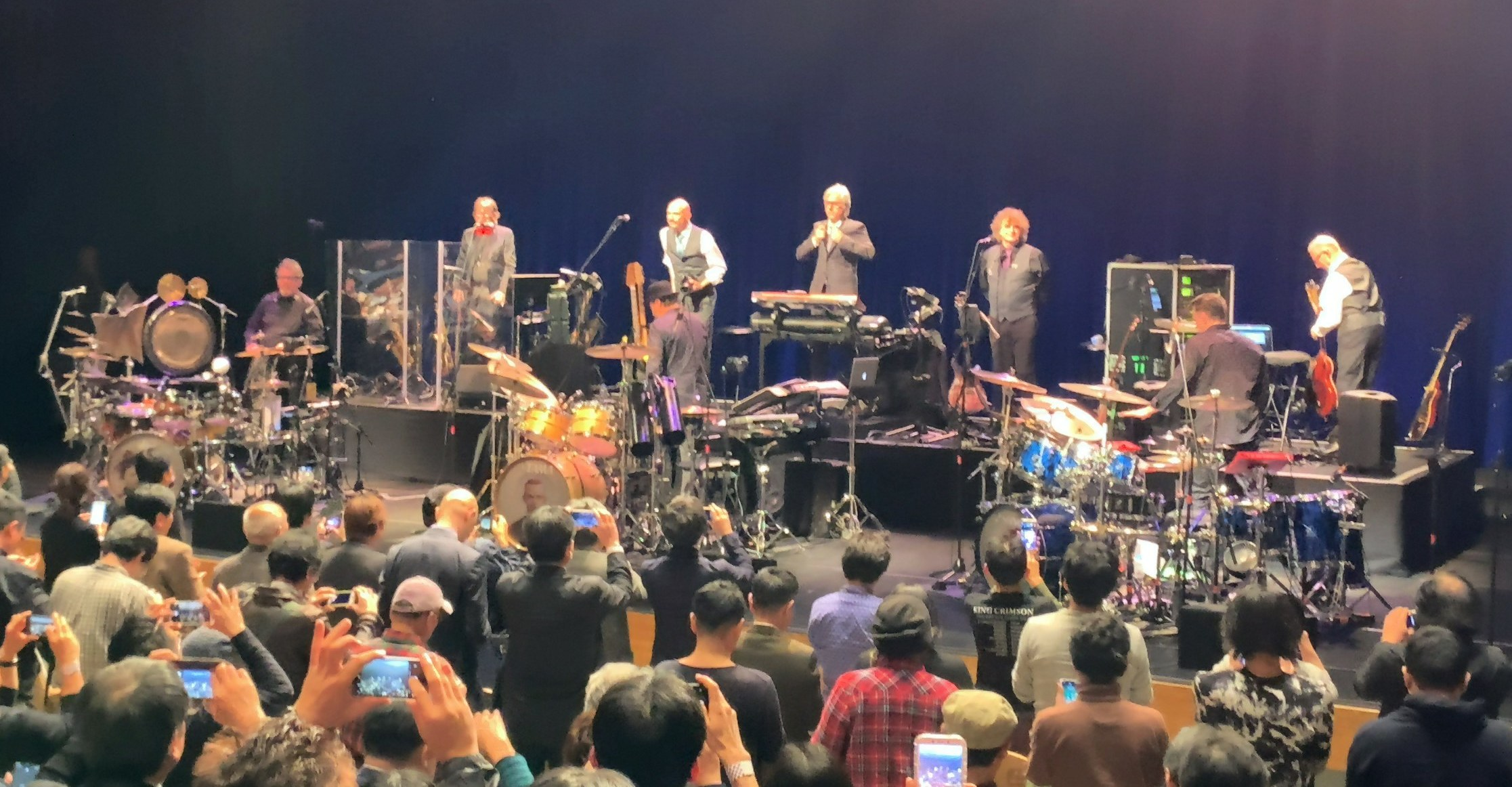
- King Crimson performing in 2018
- Studio albums: 13
- Extended plays: 6
- Live albums: 24
- Compilation albums: 23
- Singles: 10
- Video albums: 10
- Music videos: 2
- Album/era-specific box sets: 9

The discography of King Crimson consists of 13 studio albums, 24 live albums, 23 compilation albums, 6 extended plays, 10 singles, 10 video albums, 2 music videos and 9 album/era-specific box sets.

== Albums ==
=== Studio albums ===
List of studio albums, with selected chart positions and certifications
Title	Album details	Peak chart positions										Certifications
Title	Album details	UK	AUS	CAN	FRA	GER	ITA	NOR	POL	SWE	US	Certifications
In the Court of the Crimson King	Released: 10 October 1969; Label: Island	5	7	27	—	—	89	—	—	—	28	SNEP: 2× Gold; FIMI: Gold; UK: Gold; CAN: Platinum; US: Gold
In the Wake of Poseidon	Released: 15 May 1970; Label: Island	4	17	28	—	—	—	—	—	—	31	
Lizard	Released: 11 December 1970; Label: Island	26	19	60	—	—	—	—	—	—	113	
Islands	Released: 3 December 1971; Label: Island	30	49	52	—	35	21	—	—	—	76	
Larks' Tongues in Aspic	Released: 23 March 1973; Label: Island	20	—	56	—	—	8	—	—	—	61	
Starless and Bible Black	Released: 29 March 1974; Label: Island	28	73	75	—	—	7	—	—	—	64	
Red	Released: 7 October 1974; Label: Island	45	94	—	—	80	—	—	—	—	66	
Discipline	Released: 2 October 1981; Label: E.G.	41	—	18	17	—	—	—	—	37	45	
Beat	Released: 18 June 1982; Label: E.G.	39	—	47	—	—	—	24	—	—	52	
Three of a Perfect Pair	Released: 23 March 1984; Label: E.G.	30	—	43	—	58	—	—	—	—	58	
Thrak	Released: 3 April 1995; Label: E.G.	58	—	—	—	—	—	—	—	—	83	
The Construkction of Light	Released: 23 May 2000; Label: Virgin	129	—	—	—	67	18	—	—	—	—	
The Power to Believe	Released: 24 February 2003; Label: Sanctuary	162	—	—	128	65	45	—	18	—	150	
"—" denotes a recording that did not chart or was not released in that territory.

=== Live albums ===
==== Standard releases ====
List of live albums
Title	Album details
Earthbound	Released: 9 June 1972; Recorded: 11 February–10 March 1972; Label: Island
USA	Released: April 1975; Recorded: 28–30 June 1974; Label: Island
The Great Deceiver	Released: 16 November 1992; Recorded: 1973–1974; Label: Virgin
B'Boom: Live in Argentina	Released: 22 August 1995; Recorded: 6–18 October 1994; Label: DGM
Thrakattak	Released: 21 May 1996; Recorded: 2 October–29 November 1995; Label: DGM
Epitaph	Released: March 1997; Recorded: 6 May–14 December 1969; Label: DGM
The Night Watch	Released: 17 October 1997; Recorded: 23 November 1973; Label: DGM
Absent Lovers: Live in Montreal	Released: 23 June 1998; Recorded: 11 July 1984; Label: DGM
Live in Mexico City	Released: 1999; Recorded: 2–4 August 1996; Label: DGM
The ProjeKcts	Released: 26 October 1999; Recorded: 1997–1999; Label: DGM
Heavy Construkction	Released: 1 December 2000; Recorded: May – July 2000; Label: DGM
Vrooom Vrooom	Released: 13 November 2001; Recorded: 30 June 1995 – 4 August 1996; Label: DGM
Ladies of the Road	Released: 12 November 2002; Recorded: 1971–1972; Label: DGM
EleKtrik: Live in Japan	Released: October 2003; Recorded: 16 April 2003; Label: DGM
Live at the Orpheum	Released: 13 January 2015; Recorded: 30 September–1 October 2014; Label: DGM
Live in Toronto	Released: 2016; Recorded: 20 November 2015; Label: DGM
Radical Action to Unseat the Hold of Monkey Mind	Released: 2 September 2016; Recorded: 31 August–21 December 2015; Label: DGM
Live in Chicago	Released: October 2017; Recorded: 28 June 2017; Label: DGM
Live in Vienna	Released: 6 April 2018; Recorded: 1 December 2016; Label: DGM
Meltdown: Live in Mexico City	Released: 20 October 2018; Recorded: 14–19 July 2017; Label: DGM
Audio Diary 2014–2018	Released: 27 September 2019; Recorded: 9 September 2014 – 19 December 2018; Label: DGM
Music Is Our Friend: Live in Washington and Albany	Released: 19 November 2021; Recorded: 22 August, 11 September 2021; Label: DGM
Sheltering Skies	Released: 6 September 2024; Recorded: 27 August 1982; Label: DGM
2014 NYC	Released: 10 July 2026; Recorded: 18–21 September 2014; Label: DGM

==== King Crimson Collectors' Club ====
Year	KCCC No.	Album title	Recorded	Lineup	Collectors' King Crimson Box (2007)
1998	No.01	Live at the Marquee	1969	Fripp/McDonald/Lake/Giles/Sinfield	Box 1, 1969
1998	No.02	Live at Jacksonville	1972	Fripp/Collins/Burrell/Wallace	Box 2, 1971–1972
1999	No.03	The Beat Club, Bremen	1972	Cross/Fripp/Wetton/Bruford/Muir	Box 3, 1972–1974
1999	No.04	Live at Cap D'Agde	1982	Belew/Fripp/Levin/Bruford	Box 4, 1981–1982
1999	No.05–06	On Broadway	1995	The Double Trio	Box 5, 1995 and After
1999	No.07	Live in San Francisco: The Roar of P4	1999	ProjeKct Four	Box 6, ProjeKcts
1999	No.08	The Vrooom Sessions	1994	The Double Trio	Box 7, Session & Rehearsals
2000	No.09	Live at Summit Studios	1972	Fripp/Collins/Burrell/Wallace	Box 2, 1971–1972
2000	No.10	Live in Central Park, NYC	1974	Cross/Fripp/Wetton/Bruford	Box 3, 1972–1974
2000	No.11	Live at Moles Club, Bath	1981	Belew/Fripp/Levin/Bruford	Box 4, 1981–1982
2000	No.12	Live in Hyde Park	1969	Fripp/McDonald/Lake/Giles/Sinfield	Box 1, 1969
2000	No.13	Nashville Rehearsals	1997	The Double Trio	Box 7, Session & Rehearsals
2001	No.14	Live at Plymouth Guildhall	1971	Fripp/Collins/Burrell/Wallace/Sinfield	Box 2, 1971–1972
2001	No.15	Live in Mainz	1974	Cross/Fripp/Wetton/Bruford	Box 3, 1972–1974
2001	No.16	Live in Berkeley, CA	1982	Belew/Fripp/Levin/Bruford	Box 4, 1981–1982
2001	No.17	Live in Northampton, MA	1998	ProjeKct Two	Box 6, ProjeKcts
2001	No.18	Live in Detroit, MI	1971	Fripp/Collins/Burrell/Wallace/Sinfield	Box 2, 1971–1972
2002	No.19	Live in Nashville, TN	2001	The Double Duo	Box 5, 1995 and After
2002	No.20	Live at the Zoom Club	1972	Cross/Fripp/Wetton/Bruford/Muir	Box 3, 1972–1974
2002	No.21	Champaign–Urbana Sessions	1983	Belew/Fripp/Levin/Bruford	Box 7, Session & Rehearsals
2002	No.22	Jazz Café Suite	1997	ProjeKct One	Box 6, ProjeKcts
2003	No.23	Live in Orlando, FL	1972	Fripp/Collins/Burrell/Wallace	Box 2, 1971–1972
2003	No.24	Live in Guildford	1972	Cross/Fripp/Wetton/Bruford/Muir	Box 3, 1972–1974
2004	No.25	Live at Fillmore East	1969	Fripp/McDonald/Lake/Giles/Sinfield	Box 1, 1969
2004	No.26	Live in Philadelphia, PA	1982	Belew/Fripp/Levin/Bruford	Box 4, 1981–1982
2004	No.27	Live in Austin, TX	1999	ProjeKct Three	Box 6, ProjeKcts
2005	No.28	Live in Warsaw	2000	The Double Duo	
2005	No.29	Live in Heidelberg	1974	Cross/Fripp/Wetton/Bruford	
2005	No.30	Live in Brighton	1971	Fripp/Collins/Burrell/Wallace/Sinfield	
2006	No.31	Live at the Wiltern	1995	The Double Trio	Box 5, 1995 and After
2006	No.32	Live in Munich	1982	Belew/Fripp/Levin/Bruford	Box 4, 1981–1982
2006	No.33	Live in Chicago, IL	1998	ProjeKct Two	Box 6, ProjeKcts
2006	No.34	Live in Alexandria, VA	2003	ProjeKct Three	Box 6, ProjeKcts
2007	No.35	Live in Denver	1972	Fripp/Collins/Burrell/Wallace	
2007	No.36	Live in Kassel	1974	Cross/Fripp/Wetton/Bruford	
2008	No.37	Live at the Pier, NYC	1982	Belew/Fripp/Levin/Bruford	
2008	No.38	Live in Philadelphia, PA	1996	The Double Trio	
2008	No.39	Live in Milan	2003	The Double Duo	
2009	No.40	Live in Boston, MA	1972	Fripp/Collins/Burrell/Wallace	
2009	No.41	Live in Zurich	1973	Cross/Fripp/Wetton/Bruford	
2010	No.43	Live in Chicago, IL	1995	The Double Trio	
2010	No.44	Live in New Haven, CT	2003	The Double Duo	
2011	No.45	Live in Toronto	1974	Cross/Fripp/Wetton/Bruford	
2012	No.46	Live at the Marquee	1971	Fripp/Collins/Burrell/Wallace/Sinfield	
2012	No.47	Live in Argentina	1994	The Double Trio	
2016	No.42	Rehearsals & Blows	1983	Belew/Fripp/Levin/Bruford	
2019	No.48	Live in Newcastle	1972	Cross/Fripp/Wetton/Bruford/Muir	
2024	No.49–50	Live in Montreal	1984	Belew/Fripp/Levin/Bruford	

==== Collectable King Crimson ====
Year	Album details	Lineup
2006	Collectable King Crimson: Vol. 1: Live in Mainz 1974 & Live in Asbury Park 1974	Cross/Fripp/Wetton/Bruford
2007	Collectable King Crimson: Vol. 2: Live at Moles Club, Bath & Live in Philadelphia, PA	Belew/Fripp/Levin/Bruford
2008	Collectable King Crimson: Vol. 3: Live at Shepherds Bush Empire – London, England, July 1, 1996	The Double Trio
2009	Collectable King Crimson: Vol. 4: Live in Warsaw 2000	The Double Duo
2010	Collectable King Crimson: Vol. 5: Live in Nakano Sun Plaza, Tokyo, October 5/6, 1995	The Double Trio

==== DGM Live ====
Additional releases along the lines of the Collector's Club are being made available at DGM Live. This is the new Discipline Global Mobile website including King Crimson/Robert Fripp news, online diaries from Robert Fripp and The Vicar, and ongoing releases available for download in MP3 and FLAC formats.

The releases include extensive King Crimson and Robert Fripp live recordings, in addition to some previously unreleased studio material. Since the launch of the site, some shows have been made available sometimes within days or weeks of the performance. It has been noted that the Collector's Club releases will eventually be made available as downloads on the site as well. As of 1 November 2007 there are 118 releases available at the site.

Notable selections:

- Jazz Club Chesterfield, England, September 1, 1969 (2010)
- Fillmore East New York, N.Y., USA, November 21, 1969 (2006)
- Armoury – Wilmington, Delaware, Feb. 11, 1972 (2008)
- The Barn – Peoria, IL, March 10, 1972 (2011)
- Apollo Glasgow, Scotland, October 23, 1973 (2006)
- Stanley Theatre Pittsburgh, PA, April 29, 1974 (2009)
- Penn State University University Park, Pennsylvania, June 29, 1974 (2007)
- Park West Chicago, Illinois, August 1, 2008 (2008)

=== Compilation albums ===
Title	Album details
A Young Person's Guide to King Crimson	Released: February 1976; Recorded: 1968–1974; Label: Island
The Compact King Crimson	Released: 8 December 1986; Recorded: 1969–1984; Label: E.G.
Heartbeat: The Abbreviated King Crimson	Released: October 1991; Recorded: 1969–1984; Label: Caroline
Frame by Frame: The Essential King Crimson	Released: 4 November 1991; Recorded: 1969–1984; Label: Caroline
Sleepless: The Concise King Crimson	Released: 4 October 1993; Recorded: 1969–1984; Label: Caroline
Cirkus: The Young Persons' Guide to King Crimson Live	Released: 25 May 1999; Recorded: 1969–1998; Label: Virgin
The Deception of the Thrush: A Beginners' Guide to ProjeKcts	Released: 1999; Recorded: 1997–1999; Label: DGM
A Beginners' Guide to the King Crimson Collectors' Club	Released: 2000; Recorded: 1969–1998; Label: DGM
The Power to Believe Tour Box	Released: 2003; Recorded: 2002–2003; Label: DGM
The 21st Century Guide to King Crimson – Volume One – 1969–1974	Released: 2004; Recorded: 1969–1974; Label: DGM
The 21st Century Guide to King Crimson – Volume Two – 1981–2003	Released: 2005; Recorded: 1981–2003 + one new track recorded in 2004; Label: DGM
The Condensed 21st Century Guide to King Crimson	Released: 2006; Recorded: 1969–2003; Label: DGM
40th Anniversary Tour Box	Released: 2008; Recorded: 1969–2008; Label: DGM
The Elements of King Crimson 2014	Released: 2014; Recorded: 1969–2014; Label: DGM
The Elements of King Crimson 2015	Released: 2015; Recorded: 1969–2015; Label: DGM
The Elements of King Crimson 2016	Released: 2016; Recorded: 1969–2016; Label: DGM
The Elements of King Crimson 2017	Released: 2017; Recorded: 1969–2017; Label: DGM
The Elements of King Crimson 2018	Released: 2018; Recorded: 1969–2018; Label: DGM
The Elements of King Crimson 2019	Released: 2019; Recorded: 1969–2018; Label: DGM
A MOJO Anthology: Rare, Classic, Unusual and Live 1969–2019	Released: 2019; Recorded: 1969–2019; Label: MOJO
The Elements of King Crimson 2020	Released: 2020; Recorded: 1969–2019; Label: DGM
The Elements of King Crimson 2021	Released: 2021; Recorded: 1968–2019; Label: DGM
In the Court of the Crimson King – King Crimson at 50 – Music from the original soundtrack and beyond	Released: 2022 as part of expanded edition of the film; Recorded: 1969–2021; Label: DGM

=== Album/era-specific box sets ===
Title	Album details
In the Court of the Crimson King – 40th Anniversary edition – box set	Released: 2010; 6-disc box set (5 CDs and 1 DVD)
Larks' Tongues in Aspic – 40th Anniversary edition – box set	Released: 2012; 15-disc box set (13 CDs, 1 Blu-ray audio disc and 1 DVDA)
The Road to Red – 40th Anniversary edition – box set	Released: 2013; 24-disc box set (21 CDs, 2 Blu-ray discs and 1 DVDA)
Starless – 40th Anniversary edition – box set	Released: 2014; 27-disc box set (23 CDs, 2 Blu-ray audio discs and 2 DVDAs)
THRAK – 40th Anniversary edition – box set	Released: 2015; 16-disc box set (12 CDs, 2 Blu-ray discs, 1 DVDA and 1 DVD)
On (and off) The Road (1981–1984) – 40th Anniversary edition – box set	Released: 2016; 19-disc box set (11 CDs, 3 Blu-ray discs, 3 DVDAs and 2 DVDs)
Sailors' Tales (1970–1972) – 40th Anniversary edition – box set	Released: 2017; 27-disc box set (21 CDs, 4 Blu-ray discs and 2 DVDs)
Heaven & Earth – 50th Anniversary edition – box set	Released: 2019; 24-disc box set (18 CDs, 4 Blu-ray discs and 2 DVDAs)
The Complete 1969 Recordings – box set	Released: 2020; 26-disc box set (20 CDs, 4 Blu-ray discs and 2 DVD)

=== EPs ===
Mostly studio recordings, some incorporating live recordings.

Title	EP details
Vrooom	Released: 31 October 1994; Label: DGM
Level Five	Released: 1 October 2001; Label: DGM
Happy with What You Have to Be Happy With	Released: 8 October 2002; Label: Sanctuary
2014 Live EP (Cyclops EP)	Released: 2015; Label: DGM
Heroes	Released: 2017; Label: DGM
Uncertain Times (2 Vinyl 10" EP)	Released: 2018; Label: DGM

== Singles ==
Includes only singles released commercially, in various territories.
Music videos were released for "Heartbeat" and "Sleepless".

Year	A-side	B-side	Peak chart positions			Album
Year	A-side	B-side	UK	US	US Rock	Album
1969	"The Court of the Crimson King"	"The Court of the Crimson King, Pt. 2"	—	80	—	In the Court of the Crimson King
1970	"Cat Food"	"Groon" (Note: Re-released in 2020 with additional tracks)	—	—	—	In the Wake of Poseidon
1974	"The Night Watch"	"The Great Deceiver"	—	—	—	Starless and Bible Black
1976	"Epitaph" (Note: Released in UK)	"21st Century Schizoid Man"	—	—	—	A Young Person's Guide to King Crimson
1981	"Matte Kudasai"	"Elephant Talk"	76	—	—	Discipline
1981	"Thela Hun Ginjeet" (Note: Released in Spain)	"Elephant Talk"	—	—	—	Discipline
1982	"Heartbeat"	"Requiem"	—	—	57	Beat
1984	"Sleepless"	"Nuages"	79	—	51	Three of a Perfect Pair
1995	"Dinosaur" (Note: Released in US)	"Vrooom" (from Vrooom EP) "Cloudscape" (live in Argentina) "Elephant Talk" (live in Argentina) "Red" (live in Argentina)	—	—	—	Thrak
1995	"Sex Sleep Eat Drink Dream" (Note: Released in US)	"Walking on Air" (live at the Wiltern) "Heartbeat" (live in Argentina) "One Time" "Silent Night" (solo Frippertronics)	—	—	—	Thrak
1996	"21st Century Schizoid Man"	"21st Century Schizoid Man (album version)"	89	—	—	In the Court of the Crimson King
"—" denotes releases that did not chart or were not released in that country.

=== KC50 ===
This series, released across 50 weeks of 2019, aims to document "rare or unusual tracks" from the DGM archive. Each release is accompanied by commentary from David Singleton.

No.	Title	Year recorded	Year released	Notes
01	21st Century Schizoid Man (Radio Edit)	1969	1991	Edit of the original recording. From Heartbeat: The Abbreviated King Crimson.
02	The Terrifying Tale Of Thela Hun Ginjeet	1981, 1982	2008	Compilation of spoken word by Robert Fripp and Adrian Belew, as well as a live performance from 1982. From 40th Anniversary Tour Box.
03	Cadence And Cascade (Four Singers)	1970, 1991, 2017	2019	Edit featuring vocals by four members: Greg Lake, Gordon Haskell, Adrian Belew, and Jakko Jakszyk. Previously unreleased.
04	The Mincer/Law Of Maximum Distress	1973	2014	Edit featuring additional parts of the improvisation used to create "The Mincer". From Starless.
05	Inner Garden (Complete)	1994	2015	Performance of "Inner Garden" featuring both parts played continuously. From the THRAK Box.
06	Larks' Tongues In Aspic Part I (David/Jamie)	1972	2012	Outtake. From Larks' Tongues In Aspic: The Complete Recordings.
07	Ladies Of The Road (Frame By Frame Remix)	1971, 1991	2006, 2011, 2017	Remix by Robert Fripp and David Singleton, excluded from Frame By Frame: The Essential King Crimson. Previously released on DGM Live, as well as part of Islands (40th Anniversary Edition) and Sailors' Tales.
08	Space Groove II (Edit)	1997	2019	Previously unreleased edit of the original recording from Space Groove.
09	Eyes Wide Open (Acoustic Version)	2002	2002	From Happy with What You Have to Be Happy With.
10	Prince Rupert Awakes (Featuring Keith Tippett)	1970	2016, 2017	Isolated piano taken from the multitrack tapes. Previously released on DGM Live and as part of Sailors' Tales.
11	Requiem (Extended Version)	1982	2016	From Beat (40th Anniversary Edition) and On (and off) The Road.
12	Starless/Red (Edit)	1974	1991	Edit featuring the first section of "Starless" and the entirety of "Red". From Frame By Frame: The Essential King Crimson.
13	Yoli Yoli	1983	2016	Unused song previously released on DGM Live and as part of On (and off) The Road.
14	FraKctured	2000, 2019	2019	Released as a preview of the then-forthcoming Heaven & Earth box set. Remix as featured on The ReConstruKction Of Light.
15	Travel Weary Capricorn/Mars	1969	1997, 2019	Previously unreleased edit of two tracks featured on Epitaph.
16	The Sheltering Sky	1982	1984, 1997, 2004, 2012, 2016	Live performance from the band's August 27, 1982 concert in Frejus. Previously released on video as part of The Noise: Live At Frejus, Neal And Jack And Me, and On (and off) The Road. Previously released as audio on DGM Live and as part of On (and off) The Road.
17	Dinosaur (Single Edit)	1994	1995, 2015	One of two "Dinosaur" edits, previously released on several 1995 singles and as part of the THRAK Box.
18	Medley	1969, 1970, 1971, 1974, 1981, 1984	1991	A minute-and-a-half edit designed to showcase the breadth of King Crimson's (then-complete) discography. From Heartbeat: The Abbreviated King Crimson.
19	The Light Of Day (Improv)	?	2011, 2015	This is not quite the original improvisation, as it features overdubs by Mel Collins, Tony Levin, and Gavin Harrison. Previously released on the CD/DVD-A edition of A Scarcity of Miracles and The Elements Of King Crimson.
20	Fracture	1973	1974, 1997, 2014	Steven Wilson remix of the live performance featured on Starless and Bible Black and The Night Watch.
21	Two Hands (Redux)	1982	2016	Alex Mundy and David Singleton remix. Previously released as part of On (and off) The Road.
22	Elektrik	2002	2003, 2019	Released as a preview of the then-forthcoming Heaven & Earth box set. Remaster with additional multitrack elements as featured on The Power To Believe (40th Anniversary Edition).
23	Peace (Suite)	1970	2019	Previously unreleased edit which combines each part of "Peace".
24	Asbury Park (Complete)	1974	2005, 2013	Uncut version of the improv featured on USA, remixed by Steven Wilson.
25	Islands (Jakko Jakszyk Vocal)	1971, 2016	2017	Jakko Jakszyk vocal overdub of "Islands" from Sailors' Tales.
26	Bolero (Frame By Frame Remix)	1971, 1991	1991, 2009, 2015, 2017	Tony Levin bass overdub of "Bolero – The Peacock's Tale" from Frame By Frame.
27	Level Five	2017	2018	From Meltdown: Live in Mexico City.
28	Matte Kudasai (Alternate Intro)	1981	2019	Previously unreleased edit featuring Robert Fripp's lead guitar.
29	Fans, Sloth, Nuns, Felons	1996	2015	From the THRAK Box.
30	Epitaph (Greg Lake Vocal)	1969	2019	Taken from the 40th Anniversary 5.1 mix with added tracks at the end. Previously unreleased.
31	Doctor Diamond	1974	2001, 2006, 2012, 2014	Live performance from the band's March 30, 1974 concert in Mainz. Previously released as part of the Collectors' Club and Collectible King Crimson series, on DGM Live, and as part of Starless.
32	Three Of A Perfect Pair (Acapella Intro)	1984	2019	Previously unreleased edit.
33	Form No. 1	2004	2005, 2017	Previously released on The 21st Century Guide To King Crimson: Volume Two and The Elements of King Crimson.
34	Book Of Saturday (Alternate Take)	1972	2012	From Larks' Tongues In Aspic: The Complete Recordings.
35	Dangerous Curves (New Edit)	2001	2019	New edit which combines the performance of "Dangerous Curves" from Level Five with the studio version's ending.
36	Cat Food (Alternate Mix)	1970	2019	Newly edited mix which highlights Keith Tippett's piano.
37	The ConstruKction Of Light (Complete)	2000, 2019	2019	Previously unheard extra lyrics appear in the piece. Otherwise, the mix is the same as on The ReConstruKction Of Light.
38	Larks' Tongues In Aspic Part II (Alternate Take)	1972	2012	Previously released as part of Larks' Tongues In Aspic: The Complete Recordings.
39	Walking On Air	1995	1995, 2015	A live performance from the band's July 1, 1995 concert in Los Angeles. Previously released on the Sex Sleep Eat Drink Dream single and as part of the THRAK Box.
40	21st Century Schizoid Man (Morgan Studios)	1969, 2019	2019	Alternate take of "21st Century Schizoid Man" prior to the band relocating to Wessex Studios. Features Mel Collins and Jakko Jakszyk overdubs. Released as a preview of the then-forthcoming In the Court of the Crimson King 50th Anniversary Edition.
41	Groon (Take 15)	1970	2010, 2017	Alternate take of "Groon" previously released on In The Wake Of Poseidon (40th Anniversary Edition) and Sailors' Tales.
42	Elephant Talk	1995	1999	Taken from a live performance on October 5 or 6, 1995, in Tokyo. Previously released as part of Cirkus: The Young Persons' Guide to King Crimson Live.
43	The Great Deceiver (Single Edit)	1974	2019	Previously unreleased single edit of "The Great Deceiver" with an early fadeout.
44	Industrial Zone C (Edit)	1983	2019	Previously unreleased edit of the original recording from Three Of A Perfect Pair (40th Anniversary Edition).
45	Indiscipline	2017	2017	Taken from a live performance on June 28, 2017, in Chicago. Previously released as part of Live In Chicago.
46	Sailor's Tale (Alternate Take)	1971	2019	Previously unreleased version featuring unused piano, mellotron, and guitar takes.
47	One More Red Nightmare (Exposed)	1974	2019	Previously unreleased edit highlighting elements hidden in the final mix, as well as alternate guitar and saxophone takes.
48	I Talk To The Wind (Judy Dyble Vocal)	1968	1976, 1999, 2001	"I Talk To The Wind" as performed by Giles, Giles, and Fripp featuring Judy Dyble on vocals. Previously released as part of A Young Person's Guide to King Crimson, Metamorphosis, and The Brondesbury Tapes.
49	Silent Night (New Edit)	1979, 2016	2019	A previously unreleased edit featuring Jakko Jakszyk's vocal overdub and the original Frippertronics loop, creating two verses.
50	Radical Action/Meltdown (Advance Mix)	2018	2019	Previously unreleased tracks from King Crimson's in-studio performance for the Cosmic FuKc documentary.

== Videography ==
=== Video albums ===
Year	Title	Notes
1982	The Noise: Frejus	VHS release
1984	Three of a Perfect Pair: Live in Japan	VHS release
1996	Live in Japan	VHS release
1999	Deja Vrooom	DVD reissue of Live in Japan
2003	Eyes Wide Open	2 DVD set, Disc 1: Live in Japan 2003 & Disc 2: Live in London 2000
2004	Neal and Jack and Me	DVD reissue of The Noise: Frejus & Three of a Perfect Pair: Live in Japan
2012	Live in Argentina, 1994	2 DVD set, DVD-Audio & Video, King Crimson Collector's Club No.47
2022	In the Court of the Crimson King: King Crimson at 50	1 Blu-Ray, 1 DVD
2022	In the Court of the Crimson King: King Crimson at 50 (expanded edition)	2 Blu-Rays, 2 DVDs & 4 CDs
2026	2014 The Complete US Tour	2 Blu-Rays

=== Music videos ===
Year	Title	Director	Album
1982	"Heartbeat"	John Sanborn and Kit Fitzgerald	Beat
1984	"Sleepless"	Mick Haggerty and C.D. Taylor	Three of a Perfect Pair

== ProjeKcts ==
ProjeKcts	Year	Album	Notes	Box
ProjeKct One	1998	Live at the Jazz Café	Live album, Japan-only release	The ProjeKcts
ProjeKct One	2003	Jazz Café Suite	Live album, King Crimson Collector's Club No.22	Collectors' King Crimson Box 6, ProjeKcts
ProjeKct One	2007	London, Jazz Café, England – December 1, 1997	DGM Live	
ProjeKct One	2007	London, Jazz Café, England – December 2, 1997	DGM Live	
ProjeKct One	2007	London, Jazz Café, England – December 3, 1997	DGM Live	
ProjeKct One	2005	London, Jazz Café, England – December 4, 1997	DGM Live	
ProjeKct Two	1998	Space Groove	Studio album	
ProjeKct Two	1999	Live Groove	Live album, Japan-only release	The ProjeKcts
ProjeKct Two	2001	Live in Northampton, MA, July 1, 1998	Live album, King Crimson Collector's Club No.17	Collectors' King Crimson Box 6, ProjeKcts
ProjeKct Two	2007	Live in Chicago, IL, June $1, 1998	Live album, King Crimson Collector's Club No.33	Collectors' King Crimson Box 6, ProjeKcts
ProjeKct Two	2011	Ventura Theatre – Ventura, CA, March 18, 1998	DGM Live	
ProjeKct Two	2011	Palookaville – Santa Cruz, CA, March 20, 1998	DGM Live	
ProjeKct Two	2010	Great American Music Hall – San Francisco, CA, March 21, 1998	DGM Live	
ProjeKct Two	2010	Great American Music Hall – San Francisco, CA, March 22, 1998	DGM Live	
ProjeKct Two	2011	House of Blues – Los Angeles, CA, March 24, 1998	DGM Live	
ProjeKct Two	2011	Diamond Hall – Nagoya, Japan, April 7, 1998	DGM Live	
ProjeKct Two	2011	Heart Beat – Osaka, April 8, 1998	DGM Live	
ProjeKct Two	2011	Blitz – Tokyo, Japan, April 9, 1998	DGM Live	
ProjeKct Two	2011	Blitz – Tokyo, Japan, April 10, 1998	DGM Live	
ProjeKct Two	2007	Jazz Cafe – London, England, April 16, 1998	DGM Live	
ProjeKct Two	2011	Ronnie Scott's – Birmingham, England, April 18, 1998	DGM Live	
ProjeKct Two	2011	Ronnie Scott's – Birmingham, England, April 19, 1998	DGM Live	
ProjeKct Two	2011	9:30 Club – Washington, D.C., May 1, 1998	DGM Live	
ProjeKct Two	2011	Bohager's – Baltimore, MD., May 2, 1998	DGM Live	
ProjeKct Two	2011	Ballroom At The Bellvue – Philadelphia, PA., May 3, 1998	DGM Live	
ProjeKct Two	2011	Toad's Place – New Haven, CT., May 4, 1998	DGM Live	
ProjeKct Two	2010	Irving Plaza – New York, NY, May 6, 1998	DGM Live	
ProjeKct Two	2010	Irving Plaza – New York, NY, May 7, 1998	DGM Live	
ProjeKct Two	2011	Valentines – Albany, NY, US., May 8, 1998	DGM Live	
ProjeKct Two	2011	Inter-Media Arts Centre – Huntington, NY, May 9, 1998	DGM Live	
ProjeKct Two	2005	I.C. Light Music Tent – Pittsburgh, Pennsylvania, June 1, 1998	DGM Live	
ProjeKct Two	2008	Odeon – Cleveland, Ohio, June 2, 1998	DGM Live	
ProjeKct Two	2008	Park West – Chicago, Illinois, June 5, 1998	DGM Live	
ProjeKct Two	2009	Majestic Theatre – Detroit, MI, June 7, 1998	DGM Live	
ProjeKct Two	2007	Somerville Theatre – Somerville, MA., USA, June 28, 1998	DGM Live	
ProjeKct Two	2007	Old Lantern – Charlotte, Vermont, June 30, 1998	DGM Live	
ProjeKct Two	2013	18 And 19 February Rehearsals 1998 – Nashville, Tennessee	DGM Live	
ProjeKct Three	1999	Masque	Live album, Japan-only release	The ProjeKcts
ProjeKct Three	2004	Live in Austin, TX, 1999	Live album, King Crimson Collectors' Club No.27	Collectors' King Crimson Box 6, ProjeKcts
ProjeKct Three	2007	Live in Alexandria, Virginia, VA, March 3, 2003	Live album, King Crimson Collectors' Club No.34	Collectors' King Crimson Box 6, ProjeKcts
ProjeKct Three	2009	Electric Lounge – Austin, Texas, March 21, 1999	DGM Live	
ProjeKct Three	2014	Cactus Cafe – Austin, Texas, March 22, 1999	DGM Live	
ProjeKct Three	2005	Cactus Cafe – Austin, Texas, March 23, 1999	DGM Live	
ProjeKct Three	2007	Poor David's – Dallas, Texas, March 24, 1999	DGM Live	
ProjeKct Three	2014	Antone's – Dallas, Texas, March 25, 1999	DGM Live	
ProjeKct Four	1999	West Coast Live	Live album, Japan-only release	The ProjeKcts
ProjeKct Four	1999	Live in San Francisco: The Roar of P4	Live album, King Crimson Collectors' Club No.07	Collectors' King Crimson Box 6, ProjeKcts
ProjeKct Four	2005	Fox Theatre – Boulder, Colorado, Oct. 23, 1998	DGM Live	
ProjeKct Four	2011	Fox Theatre – Boulder, Colorado, Oct. 24, 1998	DGM Live	
ProjeKct Four	2008	Richard's On Richards – Vancouver, British Columbia, October 27, 1998	DGM Live	
ProjeKct Four	2011	The Fenix – Seattle, WA, Oct. 28, 1998	DGM Live	
ProjeKct Four	2008	Crystal Ballroom – Portland, OR, October 30, 1998	DGM Live	
ProjeKct Four	2011	7th Note – San Francisco, California, Nov. 1, 1998	DGM Live	
ProjeKct Four	2006	7th Note – San Francisco, California, Nov. 2, 1998	DGM Live	
ProjeKct X	2000	Heaven and Earth	Studio album	
ProjeKct Six	2006	East Coast Live	DGM Live	
ProjeKct Six	2012	Berklee Performance Centre – Boston, MA, USA, Oct. $1, 2006	DGM Live	
ProjeKct Six	2012	Nokia Theatre – New York, NY, USA, Oct. $1, 2006	DGM Live	
ProjeKct Six	2012	Keswick Theatre – Glenside, PA, USA, Oct. $1, 2006	DGM Live	
ProjeKct Six	2012	State Theatre – Falls Church, VA, USA, Oct. $1, 2006	DGM Live	
Jakszyk, Fripp and Collins	2011	A Scarcity of Miracles – A King Crimson ProjeKct	Studio album, with Tony Levin & Gavin Harrison	

== See also ==
- Robert Fripp discography
