= Rehearsals & Blows =

Compilation album by King Crimson
- Released: April 2016
- Recorded: May–November 1983
- Studio: Arny's Shack, Dorset, UK; Marcus, London, UK; Bearsville, New York, US
- Genre: Progressive rock; new wave
- Length: 43:29
- Label: Discipline Global Mobile
- Producer: David Singleton and Alex R. Mundy

King Crimson Collector's Club chronology
| Live at The Marquee (2012) | Rehearsals & Blows (2016) | Live in Newcastle (2019) |

Rehearsals & Blows is an album of studio writing sessions and rehearsals by the band King Crimson, released through the King Crimson Collector's Club in April 2016. As with Champaign–Urbana Sessions, this album shows the development of material intended for the group's next album, Three of a Perfect Pair. King Crimson biographer and historian Sid Smith describes the album in his liner notes as "work-in-progress sketches, outtakes, bright ideas, dead-ends and cul-de-sacs ... where ideas either bloomed or withered."

Two recordings present on this release were later included in the box set On (and off) The Road (1981–1984), and one of them is also included in the 40th Anniversary Edition of Three of a Perfect Pair.

While this release is numbered Club 42, it was released four years after Club 46 (Live at the Marquee 1971) as it was delayed several times.

== Content ==
A longer version of "Adrian and Robert" was included on Disc 5 of On (and off) The Road, and "Shidare Zakura" was included as a bonus track on the 40th Anniversary Edition of Three of a Perfect Pair, but it is only available in stereo and does not have a 5.1 mix. "Adrian and Robert" resembles some songs that would end up appearing on Three of a Perfect Pair, those being "Sleepless" and "Nuages". "Perfecting Three of a Perfect Pair" and "Open Hearted" showcase working versions of "Three of a Perfect Pair" and "Man with an Open Heart". "Funk Groove", "Sleepish", "Slow Sleepless", and "Working on Sleepless" show the development of "Sleepless", and in one case, "Larks' Tongues in Aspic Part III". "Easy To Solo Over" and "Do You Dig Me" showcase the development of "Dig Me", while "Industrial" is a take of "Industry" similar to "Fragmented" from Champaign–Urbana Sessions. "Steinberger Melody" shares its title with another instrumental from Champaign–Urbana Sessions, but the version included here is a different take.

"Slow Groove", "Sacramento", "Steinberger Melody", and "Shidare Zakura" do not closely resemble any songs that were finished for Three of a Perfect Pair. In "Sacramento" and "Easy To Solo Over", Bruford experiments with tuned percussion, similar to "Yoli Yoli", which appears on Fragmented. Also, "Sacramento" had been previously released, around 2009 simply under the title "Band Jam Idea" on the band's website. "An Entry of the Crims" is named after the band's entrance routine while touring in 1984, where each member would come out one by one and add contributions to an improvised piece. One such recording appears on Absent Lovers: Live in Montreal, although the studio version sounds similar to "Industrial Zone C", a bonus track on the 40th Anniversary Edition of Three of a Perfect Pair. On (and off) The Road includes a disc titled Are You Recording Gary? which is a recording of the band working in the studio edited down to 15 minutes. In it, the band records different takes of the combined arrangement of "Sleepless" and "Larks' Tongues in Aspic Part III" from before they were split into two different songs during the sessions at Bearsville Studios, where Three of a Perfect Pair was completed. These takes are similar to what is presented here as "Working on Sleepless", which also includes a section that would later be used as the middle section of "VROOOM VROOOM" on the 1995 album THRAK.

== Track listing ==
All music by Adrian Belew, Robert Fripp, Tony Levin and Bill Bruford

| No. | Title | Length |
|---|---|---|
| 1. | "Adrian And Robert" | 3:02 |
| 2. | "Slow Groove" | 3:39 |
| 3. | "Funk Groove" | 1:25 |
| 4. | "Sleepish" | 1:08 |
| 5. | "Slow Sleepless" | 2:35 |
| 6. | "An Entry of the Crims" | 4:04 |
| 7. | "Sacramento" | 4:35 |
| 8. | "Perfecting Three of a Perfect Pair" | 2:53 |
| 9. | "Open Hearted" | 3:01 |
| 10. | "Working on Sleepless" | 3:44 |
| 11. | "Easy To Solo Over" | 1:02 |
| 12. | "Do You Dig Me?" | 1:18 |
| 13. | "Industrial" | 4:09 |
| 14. | "Steinberger Melody" | 5:09 |
| 15. | "Shidare Zakura" | 2:44 |

== Personnel ==
King Crimson

- Adrian Belew – guitar
- Robert Fripp – guitar
- Tony Levin – bass guitar, Chapman stick
- Bill Bruford – drums, percussion

Production personnel

- Tony Arnold – recording engineer
- Brad Davis – recording engineer
- Alex R. Mundy – digital editing
- David Singleton – mastering
- Tony Levin – photography
- Hugh O'Donnell – design
