= Ladies of the Road =

Live album by King Crimson
- Released: 12 November 2002 (US); 2008 (Japan reissue)
- Recorded: 1971–1972
- Genres: Progressive rock, jazz rock
- Length: 111:48
- Label: Discipline Global Mobile
- Producers: Robert Fripp and David Singleton

King Crimson chronology
Vrooom Vrooom (2001)	Ladies of the Road (2002)	Happy with What You Have to Be Happy With (2002)

Professional ratings
Review scores
Source	Rating
Allmusic	4/5 stars

Ladies of the Road is a live two CD set by the English progressive rock band King Crimson, recorded in 1971 & 1972, released in 2002, and reissued in 2008 in Japan. It is named after a song on their 1971 album Islands, although the song does not feature on the album.

The first disc is a compilation of concert recordings of the band's second touring lineup: guitarist/keyboardist Robert Fripp, vocalist/bass guitarist Boz Burrell, saxophonist/flautist/keyboardist Mel Collins, drummer/backing vocalist Ian Wallace, and lyricist Peter Sinfield, who operated the soundboard, VCS3 synthesizer and lights during the shows.

The second disc consists of guitar and saxophone solos taken from multiple performances of the song "21st Century Schizoid Man" from the 1972 American tour, edited together to form a continuous, 11-part, 46 minute “extended” version titled "Schizoid Men", which never returns to the song and which ends with an abrupt mute. After 60 seconds of silence there is a "hidden" final part, which once again cuts off suddenly.

The set was compiled mostly from King Crimson Collector's Club albums: limited release live recordings of concert performances, studio and radio sessions.

== Track listing ==
=== Disc 1 ===
1. "Pictures of a City" (Fripp, Sinfield) - 8:46
  abridged, from the album Live at Summit Studios
2. "The Letters" (Fripp, Sinfield) - 4:42
  from the album Live at Plymouth Guildhall
3. "Formentera Lady (abridged)" (Fripp, Sinfield) - 6:41
  abridged, from the album Live in Detroit, MI
4. "Sailor's Tale" (Fripp) - 5:43
  abridged, from the album Live in Detroit, MI
5. "Cirkus" (Fripp, Sinfield) - 7:58
  abridged, from the album Live in Detroit, MI
6. "Groon" (Fripp) - 6:52
  abridged, from the album Live at Summit Studios
7. "Get Thy Bearings" (Donovan, arr. by Fripp, Collins, Burrell, Wallace) - 8:33
  abridged, from the album April 13, 1971 - Zoom Club, Frankfurt, Germany
8. "21st Century Schizoid Man" (Fripp, McDonald, Lake, Giles, Sinfield) - 8:57
  abridged, from the album Live at Summit Studios
9. "The Court of the Crimson King" (McDonald, Sinfield) - 0:48
  abridged, from the album Live in Detroit, MI

=== Disc 2 ===
1. "Schizoid Men 1" ("21st Century Schizoid Man") (Fripp, McDonald, Lake, Giles, Sinfield) - 1:44
  Baseball Park, Jacksonville, Florida - 26 February 1972
2. "Schizoid Men 2" (Fripp, Collins, Burrell, Wallace) - 4:46
  Baseball Park, Jacksonville, Florida - 26 February 1972
3. "Schizoid Men 3" (Fripp, Collins, Burrell, Wallace) - 3:12
  Sound Track, Denver - 14 March 1972
4. "Schizoid Men 4" (Fripp, Collins, Burrell, Wallace) - 5:15
  Kemp Coliseum, Orlando, Florida - 27 February 1972
5. "Schizoid Men 5" (Fripp, Collins, Burrell, Wallace) - 6:22
  Armoury, Wilmington - 11 February 1972 (Late Show)
6. "Schizoid Men 6" (Fripp, Collins, Burrell, Wallace) - 3:56
  Sound Track, Denver - 13 March 1972
7. "Schizoid Men 7" (Fripp, Collins, Burrell, Wallace) - 5:13
  Cinderella Ballroom, Detroit - 18 February 1972
8. "Schizoid Men 8" (Fripp, Collins, Burrell, Wallace) - 3:18
  Armoury, Wilmington - 11 February 1972 (Early Show)
9. "Schizoid Men 9" (Fripp, Collins, Burrell, Wallace) - 5:01
  Unidentified Show #2 - 1972
10. "Schizoid Men 10" (Fripp, Collins, Burrell, Wallace) - 3:23
  The Barn, Peoria - March 10, 1972
11. "Schizoid Men 11" (Fripp, Collins, Burrell, Wallace) - 4:56
  Academy Of Music, New York - February 12, 1972 (Late Show)
12. "Schizoid Men 12" (Fripp, Collins, Burrell, Wallace) - 5:42 (Hidden track after 1 min silence)
  Riverside Theater, Milwaukee - March 8, 1972

== Personnel ==
King Crimson

- Robert Fripp – electric guitar, Mellotron, Hohner Pianet
- Mel Collins – saxophone, flute, Mellotron
- Boz Burrell – bass guitar, lead vocals
- Ian Wallace – drums, percussion, backing vocals
- Peter Sinfield – live sound mixing, VCS3, stage lighting (disc 1, except tracks 1, 6 & 8)

Additional personnel

- Hunter MacDonald & John Robson – live sound mixing, VCS3, stage lighting (disc 1, tracks 1, 6 & 8; disc 2)

Production personnel

- Alex R. Mundy – digital editing
- David Singleton – mastering
- P.J. Crook – cover artwork
- Robert Ellis – photography
- Hugh O'Donnell – design

== Charts ==
Chart (2003)	Peak position
Japanese Albums (Oricon)	135
