= Live in Nashville, TN =

Live album by King Crimson
- Released: February 2002
- Recorded: November 9–10, 2001
- Venue: 328 Performance Hall, Nashville, Tennessee, United States
- Genre: Progressive rock
- Label: Discipline Global Mobile
- Producer: David Singleton and Alex R. Mundy

King Crimson Collector's Club chronology
Live in Detroit, MI (2001)	Live in Nashville, TN (2002)	Live at the Zoom Club (2002)

Professional ratings
Review scores
Source	Rating
Allmusic	4/5 stars

Live in Nashville, TN is a live album by the band King Crimson, recorded at 328 Performance Hall, Nashville, Tennessee in November 2001 and released through the King Crimson Collector's Club in February 2002.

The album includes liner notes by the band's Warr guitar player, Trey Gunn.

== Track listing ==
1. "Dangerous Curves" (Belew, Fripp, Gunn, Mastelotto) – 4:52
2. "Level Five" (Belew, Fripp, Gunn, Mastelotto) – 7:50
3. "The ConstruKction of Light" (Belew, Fripp, Gunn, Mastelotto) – 8:49
4. "ProzaKc Blues" (Belew, Fripp, Gunn, Mastelotto) – 5:58
5. "Elektrik" (Belew, Fripp, Gunn, Mastelotto) – 8:13
6. "Thela Hun Ginjeet" (Belew, Fripp, Levin, Bruford) – 5:46
7. "Virtuous Circle" (Belew, Fripp, Gunn, Mastelotto) – 7:04
8. "Elephant Talk" (Belew, Fripp, Levin, Bruford) – 4:16
9. "Larks' Tongues in Aspic (Part IV)" (Belew, Fripp, Gunn, Mastelotto) – 10:30
10. "The Deception of the Thrush" (Fripp, Gunn, Belew) – 8:09
11. "Red" (Fripp) – 5:42

== Personnel ==
King Crimson

- Adrian Belew - guitar, vocals
- Robert Fripp - guitar
- Trey Gunn - Warr guitar
- Pat Mastelotto - drums

Production personnel

- Greg Dean – recording engineer
- Alex R. Mundy – digital editing
- David Singleton – mastering
- Bill Munyon – photography
- Michael Wilson – back cover photo
- Hugh O'Donnell – design
