= Live at Cap D'Agde =

Live album by King Crimson
- Released: April 1999
- Recorded: August 26–27, 1982
- Venue: Arena, Cap d'Agde, Hérault, France; Arena, Fréjus, Var, France
- Genre: Progressive rock, new wave
- Length: 60:26
- Label: Discipline Global Mobile
- Producer: Robert Fripp and David Singleton

King Crimson Collector's Club chronology
The Beat Club, Bremen (1999)	Live at Cap D'Agde (1999)	On Broadway (1999)

Professional ratings
Review scores
Source	Rating
Allmusic	4/5 stars

Live at Cap D'Agde is a live album by the band King Crimson, released through the King Crimson Collector's Club in April 1999.

- Tracks 1–6 were recorded at the Arena, Cap d'Agde, France on August 26, 1982.
- Tracks 7–9 were recorded at the Arena, Fréjus, France on August 27, 1982. The video of the complete performance was issued on VHS as The Noise and on DVD as part of Neal and Jack and Me.

The album includes liner notes by Robert Fripp, one of the band's two guitarists.

== Track listing ==
All songs written by Adrian Belew, Robert Fripp, Tony Levin and Bill Bruford, except track 9 which is written by Robert Fripp.

1. "Waiting Man" – 7:09
2. "Thela Hun Ginjeet" – 4:30
3. "Matte Kudasai" (待ってください, "Please Wait for Me") – 3:58
4. "The Sheltering Sky" – 9:48
5. "Neal and Jack and Me" – 5:38
6. "Elephant Talk" – 4:57
7. "Indiscipline" – 12:31
8. "Heartbeat" – 4:05
9. "Larks' Tongues in Aspic (Part II)" – 7:50

== Personnel ==
King Crimson

- Adrian Belew – guitar, lead vocals
- Robert Fripp – guitar
- Tony Levin – bass guitar, Chapman stick, backing vocals
- Bill Bruford – drums, percussion

Production personnel

- Ronan Chris Murphy – mixing (Cap d'Agde)
- Brad Davis – mixing (Fréjus)
- Alex R. Mundy – digital editing
- David Singleton – mastering
- William Coupon – photography
- Hugh O'Donnell – design
