= Live at the Zoom Club =

Live album by King Crimson
- Released: May 2002
- Recorded: October 13, 1972
- Venue: Zoom Club, Frankfurt, West Germany
- Genre: Progressive rock, experimental rock, free improvisation
- Label: Discipline Global Mobile
- Producer: David Singleton and Alex R. Mundy

King Crimson Collector's Club chronology
Live in Nashville, TN (2002)	Live at the Zoom Club (2002)	Champaign–Urbana Sessions (2002)

Live at the Zoom Club is a live album by the band King Crimson, recorded on October 13, 1972 in Frankfurt, West Germany and released through the King Crimson Collector's Club in May 2002. It documents the debut performance of the Larks' Tongues in Aspic line-up of the band. The concert includes four improvised pieces, one of which later became "Fallen Angel" released on Red in 1974. The titles for the other three improvisations – "Zoom", "Zoom Zoom" and "Z'Zoom" – are references to the songs "VROOOM", "VROOOM VROOOM" and "B'Boom", respectively, from the band's 1995 album THRAK. The band made their second appearance four days later on the German TV show Beat Club, which was released in 1999 as The Beat Club, Bremen.

The album includes liner notes by the band's official biographer, Sid Smith.

Professional ratings
Review scores
Source	Rating
AllMusic	4/5 stars

== Track listing ==
Disc 1
No.	Title	Writer(s)	Length
1.	"Larks’ Tongues in Aspic, Part One"	Cross, Fripp, Wetton, Bruford, Muir	8:23
2.	"Book of Saturday"	Fripp, Wetton, Palmer-James	3:16
3.	"Zoom"	Cross, Fripp, Wetton, Bruford, Muir	22:03
4.	"Improv: Zoom Zoom"	Cross, Fripp, Wetton, Bruford, Muir	44:48

Disc 2
No.	Title	Writer(s)	Length
1.	"Easy Money"	Fripp, Wetton, Palmer-James	4:08
2.	"Improv: Fallen Angel"	Cross, Fripp, Wetton, Bruford, Muir	4:12
3.	"Improv: Z’Zoom"	Cross, Fripp, Wetton, Bruford, Muir	4:48
4.	"Exiles"	Cross, Fripp, Palmer-James	8:36
5.	"The Talking Drum"	Cross, Fripp, Wetton, Bruford, Muir	6:13
6.	"Larks’ Tongues in Aspic, Part Two"	Fripp	8:37

== Personnel ==
King Crimson

- David Cross - violin, flute, Mellotron, Hohner Pianet
- Robert Fripp - electric guitar, Mellotron, Hohner Pianet
- John Wetton - bass guitar, vocals
- Bill Bruford - drums, percussion
- Jamie Muir - percussion

Production personnel

- Alex R. Mundy – digital editing
- David Singleton – mastering
- Roger Perry – photography
- Robert Ellis – photography
- Hugh O'Donnell – design
