= Larks' Tongues in Aspic (box set) =

Box set by King Crimson
- Released: 2012
- Genre: Progressive rock
- Labels: Discipline Global Mobile; Panegyric; Inner Knot
- Producer: King Crimson

King Crimson chronology
In the Court of the Crimson King (2010)	Larks' Tongues in Aspic (2012)	The Road to Red (2013)

Larks' Tongues in Aspic is the second of the major box set releases from English progressive rock group King Crimson, released in 2012 by Discipline Global Mobile & Panegyric Records. The set is devoted to all existing recordings associated with the 1973 album Larks' Tongues In Aspic.

Over 13 CDs, 1 DVD, 1 Blu-ray, copious sleeve notes and replica memorabilia, Larks' Tongues in Aspic box covers the short lived five-piece King Crimson when the band shifted markedly in musical styles relative to their earlier work. Included is a 36-page booklet with photos, timeline/expanded diary, timeline, transcript of extensive interview of bandleader Robert Fripp conducted by David Singleton (July 2012), new essays by King Crimson historian Sid Smith and set compiler Declan Colgan. Also included are prints of the original album sleeve, individual band member postcards, reproduction of UK tour handbill and reproduction of Rainbow Theatre London concert ticket stub.

This CD, DVD-A and Blu-ray set includes every available recording of the short-lived 5 man line-up, through live performances and studio sessions. As with the rest of the 40th Anniversary Series, the release features new stereo and 5.1 surround mixes produced by Steven Wilson and Fripp, taken from the original multi-track master tapes, as well as a selection of alternative versions. Clean video footage of the band performing early versions of "Exiles", "Larks' Tongues in Aspic (Part I)" and a 30-minute improvisation became available publicly for the first time as part of this reissue; previously only one of the pieces had been broadcast on German television, with heavy visual effects applied to the image.

In addition, all known concert-recordings with this line-up are enclosed. Some of them were previously released through the King Crimson Collectors Club. There are two new recordings; one is from Glasgow, and was delivered from Ole Petter Dronen and the other one is percussionist Jamie Muir's penultimate gig with the band in Portsmouth, without credited source. The box also contains a link to a free download of a London-gig whose extremely poor audio quality renders it barely listenable; its internet-only release is meant for completists only.

== Reception ==
Professional ratings
Review scores
Source	Rating
AllMusic	4.0/5 stars
allaboutjazz	5.0/5 stars

More measured than the reaction to original album of the title, there has nevertheless been a positive response to the deluxe box set's appearance. Sean Westergaard at AllMusic giving the set a solid 4of5 rating said "There's even amazing footage of the band live on German TV that captures what a manic performer Jamie Muir could be" when describing this collection of the quintet's output. He also commented that it "is clearly not a set for the casual fan" then goes on the counter with "but it fills a need for the serious King Crimson aficionado". ProgArchive on the other hand referred to it as an "excellent addition to any prog rock music collection.

John Kelman of allaboutjazz was even more complementary regarding both King Crimson and this particular set when he suggested that "the opportunity to hear all this wonderful music, appreciate Larks' Tongues in Aspic for the landmark recording it is, and get the chance to really understand and appreciate how key Jamie Muir" were the defining ways to view this set.

== Track listing ==
The Complete Recordings, Disc 1 (Live at the Zoom Club, Frankfurt, 13 October 1972)
No.	Title	Writer(s)	Length
1.	"Larks' Tongues in Aspic (Part I)"	Cross, Fripp, Wetton, Bruford, Muir	8:22
2.	"Book of Saturday"	Fripp, Wetton, Palmer-James	3:16
3.	"Zoom"	Cross, Fripp, Wetton, Bruford, Muir	22:03
4.	"Zoom Zoom" (Improv)	Cross, Fripp, Wetton, Bruford, Muir	44:48

The Complete Recordings, Disc 2 (Live at the Zoom Club, Frankfurt, 13 October 1972)
No.	Title	Writer(s)	Length
1.	"Easy Money"	Fripp, Wetton, Palmer-James	4:08
2.	"Fallen Angel" (Improv)	Cross, Fripp, Wetton, Bruford, Muir	4:12
3.	"Z'Zoom" (Improv)	Cross, Fripp, Wetton, Bruford, Muir	4:47
4.	"Exiles"	Cross, Fripp, Wetton, Palmer-James	8:36
5.	"The Talking Drum"	Cross, Fripp, Wetton, Bruford, Muir	6:13
6.	"Larks' Tongues in Aspic (Part II)"	Fripp	8:37

The Complete Recordings, Disc 3 (re-issue video content - Live in the Studio, Bremen, 17 October 1972)
No.	Title	Writer(s)	Length
1.	"The Rich Tapestry of Life" (Improv)	Cross, Fripp, Wetton, Bruford, Muir	29:49
2.	"Exiles"	Cross, Fripp, Wetton, Palmer-James	7:52
3.	"Larks' Tongues in Aspic, Part One"	Cross, Fripp, Wetton, Bruford, Muir	6:51

The Complete Recordings, Disc 4 (Hull Technical College, Kingston upon Hull, 10 November 1972)
No.	Title	Writer(s)	Length
1.	"Walk On (No Pussyfooting)"	Fripp, Brian Eno	2:05
2.	"Larks' Tongues in Aspic (Part I)"	Cross, Fripp, Wetton, Bruford, Muir	10:09
3.	"Book of Saturday"	Fripp, Wetton, Palmer-James	3:23
4.	"RF Announcement"	Fripp	1:41
5.	"Vista Training College Under Spotlight" (Improv)	Cross, Fripp, Wetton, Bruford, Muir	29:31
6.	"Exiles"	Cross, Fripp, Wetton, Palmer-James	7:52

The Complete Recordings, Disc 5 (Hull Technical College, Kingston upon Hull, 10 November 1972)
No.	Title	Writer(s)	Length
1.	"Easy Money"	Fripp, Wetton, Palmer-James	7:21
2.	"Fallen Angel Hullabaloo" (Improv)	Cross, Fripp, Wetton, Bruford, Muir	9:22
3.	"The Talking Drum"	Cross, Fripp, Wetton, Bruford, Muir	4:49
4.	"Larks' Tongues in Aspic (Part II)"	Fripp	10:03
5.	"21st Century Schizoid Man"	Fripp, Ian McDonald, Greg Lake, Michael Giles, Peter Sinfield	7:37
6.	"John Wetton interview"	Wetton	8:53

The Complete Recordings, Disc 6 (Guildford Civic Hall, Guildford, 13 November 1972)
No.	Title	Writer(s)	Length
1.	"Larks' Tongues in Aspic (Part I)"	Cross, Fripp, Wetton, Bruford, Muir	8:57
2.	"Book of Saturday (Daily Games)"	Fripp, Wetton, Palmer-James	3:24
3.	"RF Announcement"	Fripp	0:59
4.	"All That Glitters Is Not Nail Polish" (Improv)	Cross, Fripp, Wetton, Bruford, Muir	25:39
5.	"Exiles"	Cross, Fripp, Wetton, Palmer-James	2:55
6.	"A Deniable Bloodline" (Improv)	Cross, Fripp, Wetton, Bruford, Muir	0:43

The Complete Recordings, Disc 7 (New Theatre Oxford, Oxford, 25 November 1972)
No.	Title	Writer(s)	Length
1.	"Larks' Tongues in Aspic (Part I)"	Cross, Fripp, Wetton, Bruford, Muir	14:00
2.	"RF Announcement"	Fripp	2:28
3.	"Book of Saturday"	Fripp, Wetton, Palmer-James	2:52
4.	"A Boolean Melody Medley" (Improv)	Cross, Fripp, Wetton, Bruford, Muir	19:42
5.	"Exiles"	Cross, Fripp, Wetton, Palmer-James	7:06

The Complete Recordings, Disc 8 (Green's Playhouse, Glasgow, 1 December 1972)
No.	Title	Writer(s)	Length
1.	"Larks' Tongues in Aspic (Part I)"	Cross, Fripp, Wetton, Bruford, Muir	11:16
2.	"RF Announcement; Book of Saturday"	Fripp; Fripp, Wetton, Palmer-James	2:12; 2:52
3.	"A Vinyl Hobby Job" (Improv)	Cross, Fripp, Wetton, Bruford, Muir	20:35
4.	"Exiles"	Cross, Fripp, Wetton, Palmer-James	7:35
5.	"Easy Money"	Fripp, Wetton, Palmer-James	10:04
6.	"Behold! Blond Bedlam" (Improv)	Cross, Fripp, Wetton, Bruford, Muir	6:04

The Complete Recordings, Disc 9 (Portsmouth Guildhall, Portsmouth, 15 December 1972)
No.	Title	Writer(s)	Length
1.	"Book of Saturday"	Fripp, Wetton, Palmer-James	2:57
2.	"An Edible Bovine Dynamo" (Improv)	Cross, Fripp, Wetton, Bruford, Muir	8:55
3.	"Exiles"	Cross, Fripp, Wetton, Palmer-James	6:47
4.	"Easy Money"	Fripp, Wetton, Palmer-James	9:38
5.	"Ahoy! Modal Mania" (Improv)	Cross, Fripp, Wetton, Bruford, Muir	16:06
6.	"The Talking Drum"	Cross, Fripp, Wetton, Bruford, Muir	3:22
7.	"Larks' Tongues in Aspic (Part II)"	Fripp	7:28
8.	"21st Century Schizoid Man"	Fripp, McDonald, Lake, Giles, Sinfield	8:52

The Complete Recordings, Disc 10 (Session Reels)
No.	Title	Writer(s)	Length
1.	"Keep That One, Nick"	Cross, Fripp, Wetton, Bruford, Muir	79:16

The Complete Recordings, Disc 11 (Original 1973 Stereo Mix 30th Anniversary Remaster & US promo EP)
No.	Title	Writer(s)	Length
1.	"Larks' Tongues in Aspic (Part I)" (1973 Stereo Mix)	Cross, Fripp, Wetton, Bruford, Muir	13:35
2.	"Book of Saturday" (1973 Stereo Mix)	Fripp, Wetton, Palmer-James	2:56
3.	"Exiles" (1973 Stereo Mix)	Cross, Fripp, Wetton, Palmer-James	7:41
4.	"Easy Money" (1973 Stereo Mix)	Fripp, Wetton, Palmer-James	7:53
5.	"The Talking Drum" (1973 Stereo Mix)	Cross, Fripp, Wetton, Bruford, Muir	7:26
6.	"Larks' Tongues in Aspic (Part II)" (1973 Stereo Mix)	Fripp	7:23
7.	"U.S. Radio Ad"		0:58
8.	"Easy Money" (US promo EP - Edited version)	Fripp, Wetton, Palmer-James	5:02
9.	"Exiles" (US promo EP - Edited version)	Cross, Fripp, Wetton, Palmer-James	3:02
10.	"Larks' Tongues in Aspic (Part II)" (US promo EP)	Fripp	7:12

The Complete Recordings, Disc 12 (DVDA - MLP Lossless 5.1 Surround (DVD-A players and some Blu-Ray players) - DTS 5.1 Digital Surround (DVD/Blu-Ray players and DVD-Rom/Blu-Ray drives))
No.	Title	Writer(s)	Length
1.	"Larks' Tongues in Aspic (Part I)" (The 2012 Surround Sound mix by Steven Wilson and Robert Fripp)	Cross, Fripp, Wetton, Bruford, Muir
2.	"Book of Saturday" (The 2012 Surround Sound mix by Steven Wilson and Robert Fripp)	Fripp, Wetton, Palmer-James
3.	"Exiles" (The 2012 Surround Sound mix by Steven Wilson and Robert Fripp)	Cross, Fripp, Wetton, Palmer-James
4.	"Easy Money" (The 2012 Surround Sound mix by Steven Wilson and Robert Fripp)	Fripp, Wetton, Palmer-James
5.	"The Talking Drum" (The 2012 Surround Sound mix by Steven Wilson and Robert Fripp)	Cross, Fripp, Wetton, Bruford, Muir
6.	"Larks' Tongues in Aspic (Part II)" (The 2012 Surround Sound mix by Steven Wilson and Robert Fripp)	Fripp
7.	"Larks' Tongues in Aspic (Part I)" (The 2012 stereo album mix by Robert Fripp and Steven Wilson)	Cross, Fripp, Wetton, Bruford, Muir
8.	"Book of Saturday" (The 2012 stereo album mix by Robert Fripp and Steven Wilson)	Fripp, Wetton, Palmer-James
9.	"Exiles" (The 2012 stereo album mix by Robert Fripp and Steven Wilson)	Cross, Fripp, Wetton, Palmer-James
10.	"Easy Money" (The 2012 stereo album mix by Robert Fripp and Steven Wilson)	Fripp, Wetton, Palmer-James
11.	"The Talking Drum" (The 2012 stereo album mix by Robert Fripp and Steven Wilson)	Cross, Fripp, Wetton, Bruford, Muir
12.	"Larks' Tongues in Aspic (Part II)" (The 2012 stereo album mix by Robert Fripp and Steven Wilson)	Fripp
13.	"Larks' Tongues in Aspic (Part I)" (PCM Stereo 2.0 (24/48) - Original 1973 Stereo Mix - 30th Anniversary Remaster)	Cross, Fripp, Wetton, Bruford, Muir
14.	"Book of Saturday" (PCM Stereo 2.0 (24/48) - Original 1973 Stereo Mix - 30th Anniversary Remaster)	Fripp, Wetton, Palmer-James
15.	"Exiles" (PCM Stereo 2.0 (24/48) - Original 1973 Stereo Mix - 30th Anniversary Remaster)	Cross, Fripp, Wetton, Palmer-James
16.	"Easy Money" (PCM Stereo 2.0 (24/48) - Original 1973 Stereo Mix - 30th Anniversary Remaster)	Fripp, Wetton, Palmer-James
17.	"The Talking Drum" (PCM Stereo 2.0 (24/48) - Original 1973 Stereo Mix - 30th Anniversary Remaster)	Cross, Fripp, Wetton, Bruford, Muir
18.	"Larks' Tongues in Aspic (Part II)" (PCM Stereo 2.0 (24/48) - Original 1973 Stereo Mix - 30th Anniversary Remaster)	Fripp
19.	"Larks' Tongues in Aspic, Part I" (Alternate takes and mixes - Alternative mix)	Cross, Fripp, Wetton, Bruford, Muir	11:14
20.	"Book of Saturday" (Alternate takes and mixes - Alternative take)	Fripp, Wetton, Palmer-James	2:56
21.	"Exiles" (Alternate takes and mixes - Alternative mix)	Cross, Fripp, Wetton, Palmer-James	7:48
22.	"Easy Money" (Alternate takes and mixes - Jamie Muir solo)	Fripp, Wetton, Palmer-James	7:26
23.	"The Talking Drum" (Alternate takes and mixes - Alternative mix)	Cross, Fripp, Wetton, Bruford, Muir	6:58
24.	"Larks' Tongues in Aspic, Part II" (Alternate takes and mixes - Alternative mix)	Fripp	7:08
25.	"Easy Money" (Alternate takes and mixes - Alternative take)	Fripp, Wetton, Palmer-James	7:27
26.	"Improv: The Rich Tapestry Of Life" (Video Content - audio dual mono - Dual Layer Format)
27.	"Exiles " (Video Content - audio dual mono - Dual Layer Format)	Cross, Fripp, Wetton, Palmer-James
28.	"Larks' Tongues in Aspic (Part I)" (Video Content - audio dual mono - Dual Layer Format)	Cross, Fripp, Wetton, Bruford, Muir
29.	"Larks' Tongues in Aspic (Part I) (as broadcast on Beat Club)" (Video Content - audio dual mono - Dual Layer Format)	Cross, Fripp, Wetton, Bruford, Muir

The Complete Recordings, Disc 13 (Alternate takes and mixes)
No.	Title	Writer(s)	Length
1.	"Larks' Tongues in Aspic, Part I" (Alternate takes and mixes - Alternative mix)	Cross, Fripp, Wetton, Bruford, Muir	11:14
2.	"Book of Saturday" (Alternate takes and mixes - Alternative take)	Fripp, Wetton, Palmer-James	2:56
3.	"Exiles" (Alternate takes and mixes - Alternative mix)	Cross, Fripp, Wetton, Palmer-James	7:48
4.	"Easy Money" (Alternate takes and mixes - Jamie Muir solo)	Muir	7:26
5.	"The Talking Drum" (Alternate takes and mixes - Alternative mix)	Cross, Fripp, Wetton, Bruford, Muir	6:58
6.	"Larks' Tongues in Aspic, Part II" (Alternate takes and mixes - Alternative mix)	Fripp	7:08
7.	"Easy Money" (Alternate takes and mixes - Alternative take)	Fripp, Wetton, Palmer-James	7:27

The Complete Recordings, Disc 14 (The 2012 stereo album mix)
No.	Title	Writer(s)	Length
1.	"Larks' Tongues in Aspic, Part I"	Cross, Fripp, Wetton, Bruford, Muir	13:35
2.	"Book of Saturday"	Fripp, Wetton, Palmer-James	2:56
3.	"Exiles"	Cross, Fripp, Wetton, Palmer-James	7:41
4.	"Easy Money"	Muir	7:55
5.	"The Talking Drum"	Cross, Fripp, Wetton, Bruford, Muir	7:24
6.	"Larks' Tongues in Aspic, Part II"	Fripp	7:14

The Complete Recordings, Disc 15 (Blu-ray Audio)
No.	Title	Writer(s)	Length
1.	"Larks' Tongues in Aspic (Part I)" (DTS-HD Master Surround 5.1 - LPCM 5.1 Surround - The 2012 Surround Sound mix by Steven Wilson and Robert Fripp)	Cross, Fripp, Wetton, Bruford, Muir
2.	"Book of Saturday" (DTS-HD Master Surround 5.1 - LPCM 5.1 Surround - The 2012 Surround Sound mix by Steven Wilson and Robert Fripp)	Fripp, Wetton, Palmer-James
3.	"Exiles" (DTS-HD Master Surround 5.1 - LPCM 5.1 Surround - The 2012 Surround Sound mix by Steven Wilson and Robert Fripp)	Cross, Fripp, Wetton, Palmer-James
4.	"Easy Money" (DTS-HD Master Surround 5.1 - LPCM 5.1 Surround - The 2012 Surround Sound mix by Steven Wilson and Robert Fripp)	Fripp, Wetton, Palmer-James
5.	"The Talking Drum" (DTS-HD Master Surround 5.1 - LPCM 5.1 Surround - The 2012 Surround Sound mix by Steven Wilson and Robert Fripp)	Cross, Fripp, Wetton, Bruford, Muir
6.	"Larks' Tongues in Aspic (Part II)" (DTS-HD Master Surround 5.1 - LPCM 5.1 Surround - The 2012 Surround Sound mix by Steven Wilson and Robert Fripp)	Fripp
7.	"Larks' Tongues in Aspic (Part I)" (LPCM Stereo (24/96) - The 2012 stereo album mix by Robert Fripp and Steven Wilson)	Cross, Fripp, Wetton, Bruford, Muir
8.	"Book of Saturday" (LPCM Stereo (24/96) - The 2012 stereo album mix by Robert Fripp and Steven Wilson)	Fripp, Wetton, Palmer-James
9.	"Exiles" (LPCM Stereo (24/96) - The 2012 stereo album mix by Robert Fripp and Steven Wilson)	Cross, Fripp, Wetton, Palmer-James
10.	"Easy Money" (LPCM Stereo (24/96) - The 2012 stereo album mix by Robert Fripp and Steven Wilson)	Fripp, Wetton, Palmer-James
11.	"The Talking Drum" (LPCM Stereo (24/96) - The 2012 stereo album mix by Robert Fripp and Steven Wilson)	Cross, Fripp, Wetton, Bruford, Muir
12.	"Larks' Tongues in Aspic (Part II)" (LPCM Stereo (24/96) - The 2012 stereo album mix by Robert Fripp and Steven Wilson)	Fripp
13.	"Larks' Tongues in Aspic (Part I)" (LPCM Stereo (24/96) - Original 1973 Stereo Mix - 30th Anniversary Remaster)	Cross, Fripp, Wetton, Bruford, Muir
14.	"Book of Saturday" (LPCM Stereo (24/96) - Original 1973 Stereo Mix - 30th Anniversary Remaster)	Fripp, Wetton, Palmer-James
15.	"Exiles" (LPCM Stereo (24/96) - Original 1973 Stereo Mix - 30th Anniversary Remaster)	Cross, Fripp, Wetton, Palmer-James
16.	"Easy Money" (LPCM Stereo (24/96) - Original 1973 Stereo Mix - 30th Anniversary Remaster)	Fripp, Wetton, Palmer-James
17.	"The Talking Drum" (LPCM Stereo (24/96) - Original 1973 Stereo Mix - 30th Anniversary Remaster)	Cross, Fripp, Wetton, Bruford, Muir
18.	"Larks' Tongues in Aspic (Part II)" (LPCM Stereo (24/96) - Original 1973 Stereo Mix - 30th Anniversary Remaster)	Fripp
19.	"Larks' Tongues in Aspic, Part I" (Alternate takes and mixes - Alternative mix)	Cross, Fripp, Wetton, Bruford, Muir	11:14
20.	"Book of Saturday" (Alternate takes and mixes - Alternative take)	Fripp, Wetton, Palmer-James	2:56
21.	"Exiles" (Alternate takes and mixes - Alternative mix)	Cross, Fripp, Wetton, Palmer-James	7:48
22.	"Easy Money" (Alternate takes and mixes - Jamie Muir solo)	Muir	7:26
23.	"The Talking Drum" (Alternate takes and mixes - Alternative mix)	Cross, Fripp, Wetton, Bruford, Muir	6:58
24.	"Larks' Tongues in Aspic, Part II" (Alternate takes and mixes - Alternative mix)	Fripp	7:08
25.	"Easy Money" (Alternate takes and mixes - Alternative take)	Fripp, Wetton, Palmer-James	7:27
26.	""Keep That One, Nick"" (The Session Reels)	Cross, Fripp, Wetton, Bruford, Muir
27.	"Improv : The Rich Tapestry Of Life" (LPCM Dual Mono (24/96) - Live in the studio)	Cross, Fripp, Wetton, Bruford, Muir
28.	"Exiles" (LPCM Dual Mono (24/96) - Live in the studio)	Cross, Fripp, Wetton, Palmer-James
29.	"Larks' Tongues in Aspic (Part I)" (LPCM Dual Mono (24/96) - Live in the studio)	Cross, Fripp, Wetton, Bruford, Muir
30.	"Larks' Tongues in Aspic, Part I" (LPCM Stereo (24/96) - Original UK vinyl transfer)	Cross, Fripp, Wetton, Bruford, Muir
31.	"Book of Saturday" (LPCM Stereo (24/96) - Original UK vinyl transfer)	Fripp, Wetton, Palmer-James
32.	"Exiles" (LPCM Stereo (24/96) - Original UK vinyl transfer)	Cross, Fripp, Wetton, Palmer-James
33.	"Easy Money" (LPCM Stereo (24/96) - Original UK vinyl transfer)	Muir
34.	"The Talking Drum" (LPCM Stereo (24/96) - Original UK vinyl transfer)	Cross, Fripp, Wetton, Bruford, Muir
35.	"Larks' Tongues in Aspic, Part II" (LPCM Stereo (24/96) - Original US vinyl transfer)	Fripp
36.	"Larks' Tongues in Aspic, Part I" (LPCM Stereo (24/96) - Original US vinyl transfer)	Cross, Fripp, Wetton, Bruford, Muir
37.	"Book of Saturday" (LPCM Stereo (24/96) - Original US vinyl transfer)	Fripp, Wetton, Palmer-James
38.	"Exiles" (LPCM Stereo (24/96) - Original US vinyl transfer)	Cross, Fripp, Wetton, Palmer-James
39.	"Easy Money" (LPCM Stereo (24/96) - Original US vinyl transfer)	Muir
40.	"The Talking Drum" (LPCM Stereo (24/96) - Original US vinyl transfer)	Cross, Fripp, Wetton, Bruford, Muir
41.	"Larks' Tongues in Aspic, Part II" (LPCM Stereo (24/96) - Original US vinyl transfer)	Fripp
42.	"Improv: The Rich Tapestry Of Life" (Video Content - Audio LPCM Dual Mono (24/96))
43.	"Exiles " (Video Content - Audio LPCM Dual Mono (24/96))	Cross, Fripp, Wetton, Palmer-James
44.	"Larks' Tongues in Aspic (Part I)" (Video Content - Audio LPCM Dual Mono (24/96))	Cross, Fripp, Wetton, Bruford, Muir
45.	"Larks' Tongues in Aspic (Part I) (as broadcast on Beat Club)" (Video Content - Audio LPCM Dual Mono (24/96))	Cross, Fripp, Wetton, Bruford, Muir

The Complete Recordings, Downloadable Content (Rainbow Theatre, Finsbury Park, London, England, 13 December 1972)
No.	Title	Writer(s)	Length
1.	"Larks' Tongues in Aspic (Part I)"	Cross, Fripp, Wetton, Bruford, Muir	14:42
2.	"RF Announcement"	Fripp	2:31
3.	"Book of Saturday"	Fripp, Wetton, Palmer-James	2:48
4.	"Yeah a Vile Limey Body" (Improv)	Cross, Fripp, Wetton, Bruford, Muir	14:50
5.	"Exiles"	Cross, Fripp, Wetton, Palmer-James	6:05
6.	"Easy Money"	Fripp, Wetton, Palmer-James	9:15
7.	"Abominable Ballyhoo" (Improv)	Cross, Fripp, Wetton, Bruford, Muir	12:53
8.	"The Talking Drum"	Cross, Fripp, Wetton, Bruford, Muir	7:17
9.	"Larks' Tongues in Aspic (Part II)"	Fripp	6:23
10.	"21st Century Schizoid Man"	Fripp, McDonald, Lake, Giles, Sinfield	7:53

== Personnel ==
- David Cross - violin, viola, Mellotron, Hohner Pianet, flute
- Robert Fripp - guitar, Mellotron, Hohner Pianet, devices
- John Wetton - vocals, bass guitar, piano
- Bill Bruford - drums, percussion
- Jamie Muir - percussion, drums, allsorts
