= Live in Central Park, NYC =

Live album by King Crimson
- Released: April 2000
- Recorded: July 1, 1974
- Venue: Central Park, New York, USA
- Length: 74:00
- Label: Discipline Global Mobile
- Producer: Robert Fripp and David Singleton

King Crimson Collector's Club chronology
| Live at Summit Studios (2000) | Live in Central Park, NYC (2000) | Live at Moles Club, Bath (2000) |

Professional ratings
Review scores
| Source | Rating |
|---|---|
| Allmusic | 4/5 stars |

Live in Central Park, NYC is a live album by the band King Crimson, released through the King Crimson Collector's Club in April 2000. It was recorded at the Schaefer Music Festival in Central Park, New York, USA on July 1, 1974. This was the last performance by the 1970s incarnation, and the last by King Crimson before reforming in 1981.

The album includes liner notes by the band's guitarist, Robert Fripp.

== Track listing ==
1. "Walk On... No Pussyfooting" (Fripp, Eno) 2:11
2. "21st Century Schizoid Man" (Fripp, McDonald, Lake, Giles, Sinfield) 7:58
3. "Lament" (Fripp, Wetton, Palmer-James) 4:49
4. "Exiles" (Cross, Fripp, Palmer-James) 7:53
5. "Improv: Cerberus" (Cross, Fripp, Wetton, Bruford) 8:27
6. "Easy Money" (Fripp, Wetton, Palmer-James) 6:26
7. "Fracture" (Fripp) 11:20
8. "Starless" (Cross, Fripp, Wetton, Bruford, Palmer-James) 12:31
9. "The Talking Drum" (Cross, Fripp, Wetton, Bruford, Muir) 5:30
10. "Larks' Tongues in Aspic (Part II)" (Fripp) 6:55

== Personnel ==
King Crimson

- David Cross - violin, Mellotron, Hohner Pianet
- Robert Fripp - electric guitar, Mellotron, Hohner Pianet
- John Wetton - bass guitar, vocals
- Bill Bruford - drums, percussion

Production personnel

- Alex R. Mundy – digital editing
- David Singleton – mastering
- Hugh O'Donnell – design
