= Vrooom =

VROOOM

EP (mini-album) by King Crimson
- Released: 31 October 1994
- Recorded: 2-7 May 1994
- Studios: Applehead, Woodstock, New York; Real World, Box, Wiltshire (mix)
- Genres: Progressive rock; experimental rock; jazz metal
- Length: 30:40
- Label: Discipline Global Mobile
- Producers: King Crimson and David Bottrill

King Crimson chronology
The Great Deceiver (1992)	VROOOM (1994)	THRAK (1995)

Professional ratings
Review scores
Source	Rating
AllMusic	3/5 stars
Trouser Press	favourable

Vrooom (stylised as VROOOM) is an EP by the English progressive rock band King Crimson, classified as a mini-album due to its length. It was released in 1994, as a prequel to the subsequent full-length album THRAK (1995). It is the first King Crimson release to feature the “double trio” of guitarists Robert Fripp and Adrian Belew, bassists Trey Gunn and Tony Levin, and drummers Bill Bruford and Pat Mastelotto.

Most of the tracks on VROOOM (with the exception of "Cage" and "When I Say Stop, Continue") were re-recorded for the THRAK album the following year.

A collection of instrumental improvisations and works-in-progress from these sessions was released in 1999 by the King Crimson Collectors Club as The Vrooom Sessions.

== Track listing ==
All songs written by Adrian Belew, Robert Fripp, Trey Gunn, Tony Levin, Bill Bruford and Pat Mastelotto.

1. "VROOOM" – 7:34 (includes Coda: Marine 475, and a 0:17 unlisted 'Intro' piece on original releases)
2. "Sex Sleep Eat Drink Dream" – 4:42
3. "Cage" – 1:36
4. "THRAK" – 7:19
5. "When I Say Stop, Continue" – 5:20
6. "One Time" – 4:25

== Personnel ==
King Crimson

- Adrian Belew – guitar, lead vocals
- Robert Fripp – guitar, soundscapes
- Trey Gunn – Chapman Stick
- Tony Levin – bass guitar, electric upright bass, Chapman Stick, backing vocals, didgeridoo
- Bill Bruford – acoustic & electric drums, percussion
- Pat Mastelotto – acoustic drums, percussion

Additional personnel

- David Bottrill – recording and mixing engineer
- Noah Evens – assistant recording engineer
- Meabh Flynn – assistant mixing engineer
- David Singleton – digital editing engineer
- John Sinks – equipment and strategic liaison
- The Douglas Brothers – photography
- Bill Smith Studio – design
