= Absent Lovers: Live in Montreal =

Live album by King Crimson
- Released: 23 June 1998
- Recorded: 11 July 1984
- Venue: The Spectrum, Montreal, Quebec, Canada
- Genre: Progressive rock, experimental rock, new wave
- Length: 104:38
- Label: Discipline Global Mobile
- Producer: Robert Fripp and David Singleton

King Crimson chronology
The Night Watch (1997)	Absent Lovers: Live in Montreal (1998)	Cirkus: The Young Persons' Guide to King Crimson Live (1999)

Professional ratings
Review scores
Source	Rating
AllMusic	4.5/5 stars
The A.V. Club	favourable

Absent Lovers: Live in Montreal is a live album (2-CD set) by the English progressive rock band King Crimson, recorded on July 11, 1984, and released in 1998. It is compiled from the early and late shows performed at the Spectrum in Montreal on the final night of their 1984 Three of a Perfect Pair tour. These were the band's final live performances until October 1994. The two complete shows were released in 2024 as the final release of the King Crimson Collector's Club.

== Track listing ==
All music written by Belew, Fripp, Levin and Bruford unless otherwise indicated; all lyrics written by Belew.

Disc one
No.	Title	Music	Length
1.	"Entry of the Crims"		6:27
2.	"Larks' Tongues in Aspic (Part III)"		5:05
3.	"Thela Hun Ginjeet"		6:00
4.	"Red"	Fripp	5:49
5.	"Matte Kudasai" (待ってください, Please Wait for Me)		3:45
6.	"Industry"		7:31
7.	"Dig Me"		3:59
8.	"Three of a Perfect Pair"		4:30
9.	"Indiscipline"		8:14

Disc two
No.	Title	Music	Length
1.	"Sartori in Tangier"		4:40
2.	"Frame by Frame"		3:57
3.	"Man with an Open Heart"		3:44
4.	"Waiting Man"		6:26
5.	"Sleepless"		6:08
6.	"Larks' Tongues in Aspic (Part II)"	Fripp	7:54
7.	"Discipline"		5:04
8.	"Heartbeat"		5:15
9.	"Elephant Talk"		4:54

== Personnel ==
King Crimson

- Adrian Belew – electric guitar, lead vocals, drums
- Robert Fripp – electric guitar
- Tony Levin – bass guitar, Chapman Stick, synthesizer, backing vocals
- Bill Bruford – drums, electronic drums, percussion

Production personnel

- George Glossop – live mixer
- Brad Davis – recording engineer
- David Singleton – studio editor and engineer
- Alex R. Mundy – assistant engineer
- David Singleton and Robert Fripp – mixing and mastering
- P. J. Crook – cover paintings (Absent Lovers I and II)
- Tony Levin – black and white photography
- Hugh O'Donnell – design
- Ryūji Sasaki (uncredited) – director of Three of a Perfect Pair live video (stills used on liner notes)
