= The Vrooom Sessions =

Compilation album by King Crimson
- Released: December 1999
- Recorded: April–May 1994
- Studio: Applehead Studios, Woodstock, New York, United States
- Genre: Progressive rock
- Label: Discipline Global Mobile
- Producer: Robert Fripp and David Singleton

King Crimson Collector's Club chronology
Live in San Francisco: The Roar of P4 (1999)	The Vrooom Sessions (1999)	Live at Summit Studios (2000)

Professional ratings
Review scores
Source	Rating
Allmusic	2.5/5 stars

The Vrooom Sessions is an album of studio writing sessions and rehearsals by the band King Crimson, released through the King Crimson Collector's Club in December 1999. It comprises outtakes from the sessions at Applehead Studios, Woodstock, New York which yielded their 1994 comeback EP, Vrooom.

These were the first studio recordings made by the six-piece King Crimson after Robert Fripp reformed the band in 1994 - what he referred to as the "Double Trio" lineup - with the addition of Trey Gunn as second Chapman Stick player and Pat Mastelotto as second drummer. Fripp had recently worked with both men in the Sylvian/Fripp touring band, as documented on the live album Damage.

The album includes liner notes by Fripp.

== Track listing ==
All music by Adrian Belew, Robert Fripp, Trey Gunn, Tony Levin, Bill Bruford and Pat Mastelotto

1. "Bass Groove" – 4:34
  - Recorded April 21, 1994
2. "Fashionable" – 4:59
  - Recorded April 20, 1994
3. "Monster Jam" – 8:38
  - Recorded May 4, 1994
4. "Slow Mellow" – 2:57
  - Recorded April 26, 1994
5. "Krim 3" – 3:20
  - Recorded April 26, 1994; later released on Belew's 1996 solo album Op Zop Too Wah as "I Remember How To Forget"
6. "Funky Jam" – 4:57
  - Recorded May 4, 1994
7. "Bill and Tony" – 1:36
  - Recorded April 28, 1994
8. "No Questions Asked" – 3:24
  - Recorded April 23, 1994; later reworked into "Sex, Sleep, Eat, Drink, Dream" on Vrooom
9. "Adrian's Clouds" – 1:39
  - Recorded April 22, 1994
10. "Calliope" – 5:58
  - Recorded April 23, 1994
11. "One Time" – 5:24
  - Recorded April 28, 1994; finished version appears on Vrooom
12. "Booga Looga" – 3:45
  - Recorded April 23, 1994

== Personnel ==
King Crimson

- Adrian Belew – guitar
- Robert Fripp – guitar, soundscapes
- Trey Gunn – Chapman Stick
- Tony Levin – bass guitar, electric upright bass, Chapman Stick
- Bill Bruford – drums, percussion
- Pat Mastelotto – drums, percussion

Production personnel

- Alex R. Mundy – digital editing
- David Singleton – mastering
- Tony Levin – photography
- Hugh O'Donnell – design
