= Live in San Francisco: The Roar of P4 =

Live album by ProjeKct Four
- Released: August 1999
- Recorded: November 1, 1998
- Venue: The 7th Note, San Francisco, California, United States
- Genre: Experimental rock, free improvisation, electronica
- Length: 71:41
- Label: Discipline Global Mobile
- Producer: Robert Fripp and David Singleton

King Crimson Collector's Club chronology
On Broadway (1999)	Live in San Francisco: The Roar of P4 (1999)	The Vrooom Sessions (1999)

Professional ratings
Review scores
Source	Rating
Allmusic	2.5/5 stars

Live in San Francisco: The Roar of P4 is a live album by ProjeKct Four, a King Crimson experimental offshoot band. Consisting of largely improvised music, it was recorded on November 1, 1998 at The 7th Note, San Francisco and released through the King Crimson Collector's Club in August 1999.

The album includes liner notes by the band's drummer, Pat Mastelotto.

== Track listing ==
1. "Ghost" (Fripp, Gunn, Levin, Mastelotto – 8:50
2. "Heavy ContruKction" (Fripp, Gunn, Belew) – 9:14
3. "Light ConstruKction" (Fripp, Gunn, Belew) – 8:32
4. "The Deception of the Thrush" (Fripp, Gunn, Belew) – 9:04
5. "Seizure" (Fripp, Gunn, Levin, Mastelotto) – 13:36
6. "Ghost 3" (Fripp, Gunn, Levin, Mastelotto) – 12:13
7. "ProjeKction" (Fripp, Gunn, Levin, Mastelotto) – 10:12

== Personnel ==
ProjeKct Four

- Robert Fripp – electric guitar
- Trey Gunn – Warr guitar, talker
- Tony Levin – bass guitar, electric upright bass, Chapman Stick
- Pat Mastelotto – electronic drums and percussion

Production personnel

- Pat Mastelotto & Ronan Chris Murphy – mixing
- Alex R. Mundy – digital editing
- David Singleton – mastering
- John Sinks – photography
- Hugh O'Donnell – design
