= On Broadway (King Crimson album) =

Live album by King Crimson
- Released: June 1999
- Recorded: November 1995
- Venue: Longacre Theatre, New York City, United States
- Genre: Progressive rock
- Length: 113:16
- Label: Discipline Global Mobile
- Producer: Robert Fripp and David Singleton

King Crimson Collector's Club chronology
| Live at Cap D'Agde (1999) | On Broadway (1999) | Live in San Francisco: The Roar of P4 (1999) |

Professional ratings
Review scores
| Source | Rating |
|---|---|
| Allmusic | 4/5 stars |

On Broadway is a live album (2-CD set) by the band King Crimson, released through the King Crimson Collector's Club in July 1999. It is drawn from recordings of the band's five-night stand at the Longacre Theatre, New York City on November 20, 21, 22, 24 and 25, 1995, when they were touring to promote the THRAK album.

Some of these recordings also feature on Disc 1 of the 2001 release Vrooom Vrooom. The final track, "Fearless and Highly THRaKked", also features on the 1996 album THRaKaTTaK, and on the aforementioned Vrooom Vrooom as "Biker Babes of the Rio Grande".

Lead singer and guitarist Adrian Belew performed The Beatles' "Free As A Bird" as a solo piece throughout the Broadway engagement. This was not included on the album, but was released on Belew's solo album Belew Prints and on Vrooom Vrooom.

The album includes liner notes by Robert Fripp, the band's other guitarist.

== Track listing ==
=== Disc 1 ===
1. "Conundrum" (Belew, Fripp, Gunn, Levin, Bruford, Mastelotto) – 1:57
2. "Thela Hun Ginjeet" (Belew, Fripp, Levin, Bruford) – 6:43
3. "Red" (Fripp) - 6:29
4. "Dinosaur" (Belew, Fripp, Gunn, Levin, Bruford, Mastelotto) – 7:16
5. "VROOOM VROOOM" (Belew, Fripp, Gunn, Levin, Bruford, Mastelotto) – 4:48
6. "Frame by Frame" (Belew, Fripp, Levin, Bruford) – 5:10
7. "Walking on Air" (Belew, Bruford, Fripp, Gunn, Levin, Mastelotto) – 5:28
8. "B'Boom" (Belew, Fripp, Gunn, Levin, Bruford, Mastelotto) – 5:35
9. "THRAK" (Belew, Fripp, Gunn, Levin, Bruford, Mastelotto) – 6:31
10. "Neurotica" (Belew, Fripp, Levin, Bruford) – 4:34
11. "Sex Sleep Eat Drink Dream" (Belew, Fripp, Gunn, Levin, Bruford, Mastelotto) – 4:58

=== Disc 2 ===
1. "People" (Belew, Fripp, Gunn, Levin, Bruford, Mastelotto) – 6:14
2. "One Time" (Belew, Fripp, Gunn, Levin, Bruford, Mastelotto) – 5:55
3. "Indiscipline" (Belew, Fripp, Levin, Bruford) – 7:16
4. "Two Sticks" (Gunn, Levin) – 2:02
5. "Elephant Talk" (Belew, Fripp, Levin, Bruford) – 4:17
6. "Prism" (Favre) – 3:56
7. "The Talking Drum" (Cross, Fripp, Wetton, Bruford, Muir) – 2:59
8. "Larks' Tongues in Aspic (Part II)" (Fripp) – 7:27
9. "Three of a Perfect Pair" (Belew, Fripp, Levin, Bruford) – 4:22
10. "VROOOM" (Belew, Fripp, Gunn, Levin, Bruford, Mastelotto) – 3:54
11. "Coda: Marine 475" (Belew, Fripp, Gunn, Levin, Bruford, Mastelotto) – 2:41
12. "Fearless and Highly THRaKked" (Belew, Fripp, Gunn, Levin, Bruford, Mastelotto) – 2:31

== Personnel ==
King Crimson

- Adrian Belew – guitar, lead vocals
- Robert Fripp – guitar
- Trey Gunn – Warr guitar
- Tony Levin – bass guitar, electric upright bass, Chapman Stick, backing vocals
- Bill Bruford – drums, percussion
- Pat Mastelotto – drums, percussion

Production personnel

- Noah Evens – recording engineer
- Adrian Belew & Ken Latchney – mixing
- Alex R. Mundy – digital editing
- David Singleton – mastering
- Steve Jennings – back cover photo
- Hugh O'Donnell – front cover photo, design
