= Sid Smith (music writer) =

Sid Smith is an English freelance writer, contributing music-related articles and reviews to both national and regional press. He is the author of the biography of King Crimson, In The Court Of King Crimson, and one of the co-authors of Northstars, the book of Granada TV's award-winning profile of musicians from the north east of England, as well as numerous sleeve notes for both major and indie record labels.

After spending the 1970s as a musician (playing bass in rock and improvised music) and performance artist, he joined local government in the 1980s, working in the arts until turning to writing full-time in 2002.

In addition to providing web-based content for several music sites, he has maintained an online diary since 1999, initially on King Crimson's website, before transferring to Krimson News in 2003. In May 2005, Smith began his 'Postcards From The Yellow Room' blog, containing album reviews, domestic life (including his mother's battle with leukaemia in 2006) and other commentaries on the arts in general.
