= Live at Summit Studios =

Live album by King Crimson
- Released: February 2000
- Recorded: 12 March 1972
- Venues: Summit Studios, Denver, Colorado, United States
- Genre: Progressive rock
- Label: Discipline Global Mobile
- Producers: Robert Fripp and David Singleton

King Crimson Collector's Club chronology
The Vrooom Sessions (1999)	Live at Summit Studios (2000)	Live in Central Park, NYC (2000)

Professional ratings
Review scores
Source	Rating
Allmusic	4/5 stars

Live at Summit Studios is a live album of radio session recordings by the band King Crimson, released through the King Crimson Collector's Club in February 2000. The album was recorded at Summit Studios in Denver, Colorado on 12 March 1972 during one of the band's American tours. The performance was notable for the absence of the band's trademark Mellotron, resulting in an unusual setlist and the inclusion of two lengthy collective improvisations.

The liner notes for Live at Summit Studios were written by the band's drummer Ian Wallace, who discusses the Denver show and chronicles his involvement with King Crimson throughout 1971 and 1972. Wallace's track "My Hobby" is a brief comedy piece in the style of Monty Python.

The album was later re-released in high resolution and surround sound on an audio DVD with the 40th Anniversary Edition of the live album Earthbound. Additionally, a Quadraphonic mix of this recording was later included with the Islands 50th Anniversary Edition Blu-ray released on 25th September, 2026 by David Singleton.

== Track listing ==
1. "Pictures of a City" (Fripp, Sinfield) – 9:38
2. "Cadence and Cascade" (Fripp, Sinfield) – 4:46
3. "Groon" (Fripp) – 13:49
4. "21st Century Schizoid Man" (Fripp, McDonald, Lake, Giles, Sinfield) – 10:10
5. "Summit Going On" (Fripp, Collins, Burrell, Wallace) – 11:39
6. "My Hobby" (Wallace) – 1:31
7. "Sailor's Tale" (Fripp) – 6:52
8. "The Creator Has a Master Plan" (Sanders, Thomas), including "Summit and Something Else" (Fripp, Collins, Burrell, Wallace) – 15:26

== Personnel ==
King Crimson

- Robert Fripp – electric guitar
- Mel Collins – saxophone, flute
- Boz Burrell – bass guitar, lead vocals
- Ian Wallace – drums, percussion, backing vocals

Production personnel

- Alex R. Mundy – digital editing
- David Singleton – mastering
- Hugh O'Donnell – design
