= On (and off) The Road (1981–1984) =

Box set by King Crimson
- Released: 2016
- Genres: Progressive rock, new wave
- Labels: Discipline Global Mobile; Panegyric; Inner Knot
- Producer: King Crimson

King Crimson chronology
THRAK (2015)	On (and off) The Road (1981–1984) (2016)	Sailors' Tales (1970–1972) (2017)

On (and off) The Road (1981–1984) is the sixth of the major box set releases from English progressive rock group King Crimson, released in 2016 by Discipline Global Mobile & Panegyric Records.

Across 11 CDs, 3 Blu-ray audio and video discs, 3 DVD-As and 2 DVDs, it is a limited edition box set featuring the studio and live recordings – many previously unreleased – of King Crimson's 1980s line-up.

It includes the 2011 stereo and 5.1 surround mixes of Discipline, with the 2016 stereo and 5.1 surround mixes of Beat and Three of a Perfect Pair by Steven Wilson and Robert Fripp.

== Track listing ==
On (and off) The Road, Disc 1: Discipline – 2011 Stereo Mix
No.	Title	Length
1.	"Elephant Talk"	4:44
2.	"Frame By Frame"	5:09
3.	"Matte Kudasai"	3:48
4.	"Indiscipline"	4:34
5.	"Thela Hun Ginjeet"	6:26
6.	"The Sheltering Sky"	8:22
7.	"Discipline"	5:11
8.	"A Selection Of Adrian's Vocal Loops" (Bonus Tracks)	0:19
9.	"A Selection Of Adrian's Vocal Loops" (Bonus Tracks)	0:34
10.	"The Sheltering Sky (Alternate Mix – Steven Wilson)" (Bonus Tracks)	8:27
11.	"Thela Hun Ginjeet (Alternate Mix – Steven Wilson)" (Bonus Tracks)	6:32

On (and off) The Road, Disc 2: Live In Japan
No.	Title	Length
1.	"Discipline"	6:10
2.	"Thela Hun Ginjeet"	8:10
3.	"Red"	7:30
4.	"Matte Kudasai"	3:47
5.	"The Sheltering Sky"	12:19
6.	"Frame By Frame"	5:14
7.	"Manhattan"	6:14
8.	"Indiscipline"	10:10
9.	"Neal And Jack And Me"	6:51
10.	"Elephant Talk"	5:32
11.	"Larks' Tongues In Aspic Part II"	7:29

On (and off) The Road, Disc 3: Beat – 2016 Stereo Mix
No.	Title	Length
1.	"Neal And Jack And Me"	4:24
2.	"Heartbeat"	3:51
3.	"Sartori In Tangier"	3:35
4.	"Waiting Man"	4:27
5.	"Neurotica"	4:50
6.	"Two Hands"	3:23
7.	"The Howler"	4:14
8.	"Requiem (Extended Version)"	12:16
9.	"Absent Lovers" (Bonus Track – Instrumental, Studio Recording)	4:12

On (and off) The Road, Disc 4: Live At Alabamahalle, Munich, 29 September 1982
No.	Title	Length
1.	"Waiting Man"	10:03
2.	"Thela Hun Ginjeet"	7:24
3.	"Frame By Frame"	5:30
4.	"Matte Kudasai"	3:47
5.	"The Sheltering Sky"	10:49
6.	"Neal And Jack And Me"	5:46
7.	"Elephant Talk"	5:02
8.	"Indiscipline"	10:18
9.	"Heartbeat"	4:16
10.	"Larks' Tongues In Aspic Part II"	7:01

On (and off) The Road, Disc 5: Fragmented, mostly recorded 17–30 January 1983 at C.V. Lloyd Music, Champaign, IL
No.	Title	Length
1.	"San Francisco"	2:04
2.	"Tony Bass Riff"	3:29
3.	"Sequenced"	3:56
4.	"Steinberger Melody"	5:00
5.	"Fragmented"	4:02
6.	"Not One Of Those"	1:45
7.	"ZZZZs"	2:11
8.	"Reel 3 Jam"	2:33
9.	"Robert And Bill"	2:08
10.	"Say NO"	2:46
11.	"Robert's Ballad"	3:46
12.	"Heat In The Jungle"	7:08
13.	"Grace Jones"	5:46
14.	"Adrian Looped"	1:20
15.	"Yoli Yoli"	3:22
16.	"Adrian And Robert"	7:46

On (and off) The Road, Disc 6: Three Of A Perfect Pair – 2016 Stereo Mix
No.	Title	Length
1.	"Three Of A Perfect Pair"	4:21
2.	"Model Man"	4:02
3.	"Sleepless"	5:37
4.	"Man With An Open Heart"	3:07
5.	"Nuages (That Which Passes, Passes Like Clouds)"	4:48
6.	"Industry"	7:04
7.	"Dig Me"	3:16
8.	"No Warning"	3:30
9.	"Larks' Tongues In Aspic Part III"	6:08
10.	"The King Crimson Barber Shop" (Bonus Tracks)	1:38
11.	"Robert's Ballad" (Bonus Tracks)	3:23
12.	"Shidare Zakura" (Bonus Tracks)	2:41
13.	"Industrial Zone A" (Bonus Tracks)	3:16
14.	"Industrial Zone B" (Bonus Tracks)	5:35
15.	"Industrial Zone C" (Bonus Tracks)	15:51

On (and off) The Road, Disc 7: Absent Lovers – Live at The Spectrum, Montreal, 11 July 1984
No.	Title	Length
1.	"Entry Of The Crims"	6:27
2.	"Larks' Tongues In Aspic Part III"	5:06
3.	"Thela Hun Ginjeet"	7:08
4.	"Red"	5:49
5.	"Matte Kudasai"	3:47
6.	"Industry"	7:31
7.	"Dig Me"	4:00
8.	"Three Of A Perfect Pair"	4:31
9.	"Indiscipline"	8:12

On (and off) The Road, Disc 8: Absent Lovers – Live at The Spectrum, Montreal, 11 July 1984
No.	Title	Length
1.	"Sartori In Tangier"	4:40
2.	"Frame By Frame"	3:58
3.	"Man With An Open Heart"	3:45
4.	"Waiting Man"	6:26
5.	"Sleepless"	6:08
6.	"Larks' Tongues In Aspic Part II"	7:55
7.	"Discipline"	5:04
8.	"Heartbeat"	5:16
9.	"Elephant Talk"	8:59

On (and off) The Road, Disc 9: Are You Recording Gary?
No.	Title	Length
1.	"Are You Recording Gary?"	15:47
2.	"Discipline Redux"	11:06
3.	"Beat Redux"	15:21
4.	"Three Of A Perfect Pair Redux"	14:43

On (and off) The Road, Disc 10 (DVDA 1): Discipline – 2011 Surround Mix/2011 Stereo Mix/30th Anniversary Remaster etc
No.	Title	Length
1.	"Elephant Talk" (2011 Surround Mix)	4:44
2.	"Frame By Frame" (2011 Surround Mix)	5:09
3.	"Matte Kudasai" (2011 Surround Mix)	3:47
4.	"Indiscipline" (2011 Surround Mix)	4:35
5.	"Thela Hun Ginjeet" (2011 Surround Mix)	6:27
6.	"The Sheltering Sky" (2011 Surround Mix)	8:23
7.	"Discipline" (2011 Surround Mix)	5:03
8.	"Elephant Talk" (2011 Stereo Mix)	4:44
9.	"Frame By Frame" (2011 Stereo Mix)	5:09
10.	"Matte Kudasai" (2011 Stereo Mix)	3:47
11.	"Indiscipline" (2011 Stereo Mix)	4:35
12.	"Thela Hun Ginjeet" (2011 Stereo Mix)	6:27
13.	"The Sheltering Sky" (2011 Stereo Mix)	8:23
14.	"Discipline" (2011 Stereo Mix)	5:03
15.	"Elephant Talk" (30th Anniversary Remaster)	4:44
16.	"Frame By Frame" (30th Anniversary Remaster)	5:09
17.	"Matte Kudasai" (30th Anniversary Remaster)	3:47
18.	"Indiscipline" (30th Anniversary Remaster)	4:35
19.	"Thela Hun Ginjeet" (30th Anniversary Remaster)	6:27
20.	"The Sheltering Sky" (230th Anniversary Remaster)	8:23
21.	"Discipline" (30th Anniversary Remaster)	5:03
22.	"Matte Kudasai" (30th Anniversary Remaster – Alternative Version)	5:03
23.	"A Selection Of Adrian's Vocal Loops" (Additional Tracks)	0:52
24.	"The Sheltering Sky" (Additional Tracks – Alternate Mix – Steven Wilson)	8:28
25.	"Thela Hun Ginjeet" (Additional Tracks – Alternate Mix – Steven Wilson)	6:33
26.	"The Terrifying Tale Of Thela Hun Ginjeet"	8:02
27.	"Elephant Talk" (Additional Tracks – 12" Dance Mix)	5:05
28.	"Discipline" (Album Rough Mixes)	5:06
29.	"Thela Hun Ginjeet" (Album Rough Mixes)	6:22
30.	"Matte Kudasai" (Album Rough Mixes)	3:47
31.	"Elephant Talk" (Album Rough Mixes)	4:43
32.	"The Sheltering Sky" (Album Rough Mixes)	8:23
33.	"Frame By Frame" (Album Rough Mixes)	5:11
34.	"Indiscipline" (Album Rough Mixes)	4:38
35.	"Elephant Talk" (Video Content – Selections From The Old Grey Whistle Test)	4:46
36.	"Frame By Frame" (Video Content – Selections From The Old Grey Whistle Test)	4:42
37.	"Indiscipline" (Video Content – Selections From The Old Grey Whistle Test)	6:50

On (and off) The Road, Disc 11 (DVDA 2): Beat 2016 Surround Mix/2016 Stereo Mix/30th Anniversary Remaster etc
No.	Title	Length
1.	"Neal And Jack And Me" (2016 Surround Mix)	4:24
2.	"Heartbeat" (2016 Surround Mix)	3:52
3.	"Sartori In Tangier" (2016 Surround Mix)	3:34
4.	"Waiting Man" (2016 Surround Mix)	4:26
5.	"Neurotica" (2016 Surround Mix)	4:50
6.	"Two Hands" (2016 Surround Mix)	3:23
7.	"The Howler" (2016 Surround Mix)	4:13
8.	"Requiem (Extended Version)" (2016 Surround Mix)	12:12
9.	"Absent Lovers" (2016 Surround Mix – Bonus Track – Instrumental, Studio Recording)	4:13
10.	"Neal And Jack And Me" (2016 Stereo Mix)	4:24
11.	"Heartbeat" (2016 Stereo Mix)	3:52
12.	"Sartori In Tangier" (2016 Stereo Mix)	3:34
13.	"Waiting Man" (2016 Stereo Mix)	4:26
14.	"Neurotica" (2016 Stereo Mix)	4:50
15.	"Two Hands" (2016 Stereo Mix)	3:23
16.	"The Howler" (2016 Stereo Mix)	4:13
17.	"Requiem (Extended Version)" (2016 Stereo Mix)	12:12
18.	"Absent Lovers" (2016 Stereo Mix – Bonus Track – Instrumental, Studio Recording)	4:13
19.	"Neal And Jack And Me" (30th Anniversary Remaster)	4:23
20.	"Heartbeat" (30th Anniversary Remaster)	3:54
21.	"Sartori In Tangier" (30th Anniversary Remaster)	3:34
22.	"Waiting Man" (30th Anniversary Remaster)	4:27
23.	"Neurotica" (30th Anniversary Remaster)	4:49
24.	"Two Hands" (30th Anniversary Remaster)	3:23
25.	"The Howler" (30th Anniversary Remaster)	4:13
26.	"Requiem" (30th Anniversary Remaster)	6:38
27.	"Neal And Jack And Me" (Alternate Album)	4:23
28.	"Heartbeat" (Alternate Album)	3:54
29.	"Sartori In Tangier" (Alternate Album)	3:33
30.	"Waiting Man" (Alternate Album)	4:23
31.	"Neurotica" (Alternate Album)	4:18
32.	"Two Hands" (Alternate Album)	3:24
33.	"The Howler" (Alternate Album)	3:50
34.	"Requiem" (Alternate Album)	6:43
35.	"Neal And Jack And Me" (Alternate Album – Alt. Take)	6:14
36.	"Absent Lovers" (Alternate Album – Live, Oxford)	4:59
37.	"Heartbeat" (Video Content – Studio)	4:01
38.	"Waiting Man" (Video Content – Live, Munich 1982)	9:30
39.	"Heartbeat" (Video Content – Live, Munich 1982)	4:19

On (and off) The Road, Disc 12 (DVDA 3): Three Of A Perfect Pair 2016 Surround Mix/2016 Stereo Mix/30th Anniversary Remaster etc
No.	Title	Length
1.	"Three Of A Perfect Pair" (2016 Surround Mix)	4:22
2.	"Model Man" (2016 Surround Mix)	3:59
3.	"Sleepless" (2016 Surround Mix)	5:37
4.	"Man With An Open Heart" (2016 Surround Mix)	3:08
5.	"Nuages (That Which Passes, Passes Like Clouds)" (2016 Surround Mix)	4:48
6.	"Industry" (2016 Surround Mix)	7:06
7.	"Dig Me" (2016 Surround Mix)	3:16
8.	"No Warning" (2016 Surround Mix)	3:29
9.	"Larks' Tongues In Aspic Part III" (2016 Surround Mix)	6:04
10.	"The King Crimson Barber Shop" (2016 Surround Mix – Bonus Tracks)	1:41
11.	"Robert's Ballad" (2016 Surround Mix – Bonus Tracks)	3:23
12.	"Three Of A Perfect Pair" (2016 Stereo Mix)	4:22
13.	"Model Man" (2016 Stereo Mix)	3:59
14.	"Sleepless" (2016 Stereo Mix)	5:37
15.	"Man With An Open Heart" (2016 Stereo Mix)	3:08
16.	"Nuages (That Which Passes, Passes Like Clouds)" (2016 Stereo Mix)	4:48
17.	"Industry" (2016 Stereo Mix)	7:06
18.	"Dig Me" (2016 Stereo Mix)	3:16
19.	"No Warning" (2016 Stereo Mix)	3:29
20.	"Larks' Tongues In Aspic Part III" (2016 Stereo Mix)	6:04
21.	"The King Crimson Barber Shop" (2016 Stereo Mix – Bonus Tracks)	1:41
22.	"Robert's Ballad" (2016 Stereo Mix – Bonus Tracks)	3:23
23.	"Shidare Zakura" (2016 Stereo Mix – Bonus Tracks)	2:40
24.	"Industrial Zone A" (2016 Stereo Mix – Bonus Tracks)	3:15
25.	"Industrial Zone B" (2016 Stereo Mix – Bonus Tracks)	5:36
26.	"Industrial Zone C" (2016 Stereo Mix – Bonus Tracks)	15:52
27.	"Three Of A Perfect Pair" (30th Anniversary Remaster – Left Side)	4:22
28.	"Model Man" (30th Anniversary Remaster – Left Side)	3:59
29.	"Sleepless" (30th Anniversary Remaster – Left Side)	5:37
30.	"Man With An Open Heart" (30th Anniversary Remaster – Left Side)	3:08
31.	"Nuages (That Which Passes, Passes Like Clouds)" (30th Anniversary Remaster – Left Side)	4:48
32.	"Industry" (30th Anniversary Remaster – Right Side)	7:06
33.	"Dig Me" (30th Anniversary Remaster – Right Side)	3:16
34.	"No Warning" (30th Anniversary Remaster – Right Side)	3:29
35.	"Larks' Tongues In Aspic Part III" (30th Anniversary Remaster – Right Side)	6:04
36.	"The King Crimson Barber Shop" (30th Anniversary Remaster – Other Side)	1:38
37.	"Industrial Zone A" (30th Anniversary Remaster – Other Side)	1:43
38.	"Industrial Zone B" (30th Anniversary Remaster – Other Side)	4:34
39.	"Sleepless" (30th Anniversary Remaster – Other Side – Tony Levin Mix)	7:28
40.	"Sleepless" (30th Anniversary Remaster – Other Side – Bob Clearmountain Mix)	5:25
41.	"Sleepless" (30th Anniversary Remaster – Other Side – Dance Mix – F. Kevorkian)	6:20
42.	"Sleepless" (Video Content – Promotional Video)	3:41

On (and off) The Road, Disc 13 (Blu-ray Audio 1): Discipline 2011 Surround Mix/2011 Stereo Mix/30th Anniversary Remaster etc
No.	Title	Length
1.	"Elephant Talk" (2011 Surround Mix)	4:44
2.	"Frame By Frame" (2011 Surround Mix)	5:09
3.	"Matte Kudasai" (2011 Surround Mix)	3:48
4.	"Indiscipline" (2011 Surround Mix)	4:33
5.	"Thela Hun Ginjeet" (2011 Surround Mix)	6:25
6.	"The Sheltering Sky" (2011 Surround Mix)	8:23
7.	"Discipline" (2011 Surround Mix)	5:01
8.	"Elephant Talk" (2011 Stereo Mix)	4:44
9.	"Frame By Frame" (2011 Stereo Mix)	5:09
10.	"Matte Kudasai" (2011 Stereo Mix)	3:48
11.	"Indiscipline" (2011 Stereo Mix)	4:33
12.	"Thela Hun Ginjeet" (2011 Stereo Mix)	6:25
13.	"The Sheltering Sky" (2011 Stereo Mix)	8:23
14.	"Discipline" (2011 Stereo Mix)	5:01
15.	"Elephant Talk" (30th Anniversary Remaster)	4:44
16.	"Frame By Frame" (30th Anniversary Remaster)	5:09
17.	"Matte Kudasai" (30th Anniversary Remaster)	3:48
18.	"Indiscipline" (30th Anniversary Remaster)	4:33
19.	"Thela Hun Ginjeet" (30th Anniversary Remaster)	6:25
20.	"The Sheltering Sky" (230th Anniversary Remaster)	8:23
21.	"Discipline" (30th Anniversary Remaster)	5:02
22.	"A Selection Of Adrian's Vocal Loops" (Additional Tracks)	0:53
23.	"The Sheltering Sky" (Additional Tracks – Alternate Mix – Steven Wilson)	8:27
24.	"Thela Hun Ginjeet" (Additional Tracks – Alternate Mix – Steven Wilson)	6:32
25.	"Matte Kudasai" (Additional Tracks – Alternate Mix)	3:50
26.	"The Terrifying Tale Of Thela Hun Ginjeet"	8:03
27.	"Elephant Talk" (Additional Tracks – 12" Dance Mix)	5:03
28.	"Discipline" (Album Rough Mixes)	5:06
29.	"Thela Hun Ginjeet" (Album Rough Mixes)	6:22
30.	"Matte Kudasai" (Album Rough Mixes)	3:46
31.	"Elephant Talk" (Album Rough Mixes)	4:44
32.	"The Sheltering Sky" (Album Rough Mixes)	8:23
33.	"Frame By Frame" (Album Rough Mixes)	5:11
34.	"Indiscipline" (Album Rough Mixes)	4:33
35.	"Elephant Talk" (Video Content – Selections From The Old Grey Whistle Test)	4:49
36.	"Frame By Frame" (Video Content – Selections From The Old Grey Whistle Test)	5:17
37.	"Indiscipline" (Video Content – Selections From The Old Grey Whistle Test)	6:14
38.	"Soundcheck And French TV Interview" (Video Content – Moles Club, 5 October 1981)	4:22
39.	"Waiting Man" (Video Content – Live In Frejus (Widescreen Format, Stereo & 5.1 Surround))	8:40
40.	"Matte Kudasai" (Video Content – Live In Frejus (Widescreen Format, Stereo & 5.1 Surround))	3:33
41.	"The Sheltering Sky" (Video Content – Live In Frejus (Widescreen Format, Stereo & 5.1 Surround))	11:02
42.	"Neal And Jack And Me" (Video Content – Live In Frejus (Widescreen Format, Stereo & 5.1 Surround))	5:50
43.	"Indiscipline" (Video Content – Live In Frejus (Widescreen Format, Stereo & 5.1 Surround))	10:59
44.	"Heartbeat" (Video Content – Live In Frejus (Widescreen Format, Stereo & 5.1 Surround))	4:20
45.	"Larks' Tongues In Aspic Part II" (Video Content – Live In Frejus (Widescreen Format, Stereo & 5.1 Surround))	6:51

On (and off) The Road, Disc 14 (Blu-ray Audio 2): Beat 2016 Surround Mix/2016 Stereo Mix/30th Anniversary Remaster etc
No.	Title	Length
1.	"Neal And Jack And Me" (2016 Surround Mix)	4:25
2.	"Heartbeat" (2016 Surround Mix)	3:50
3.	"Sartori In Tangier" (2016 Surround Mix)	3:35
4.	"Waiting Man" (2016 Surround Mix)	4:26
5.	"Neurotica" (2016 Surround Mix)	4:49
6.	"Two Hands" (2016 Surround Mix)	3:23
7.	"The Howler" (2016 Surround Mix)	4:12
8.	"Requiem (Extended Version)" (2016 Surround Mix)	12:11
9.	"Absent Lovers" (2016 Surround Mix – Bonus Track – Instrumental, Studio Recording)	4:12
10.	"Neal And Jack And Me" (2016 Stereo Mix)	4:25
11.	"Heartbeat" (2016 Stereo Mix)	3:50
12.	"Sartori In Tangier" (2016 Stereo Mix)	3:35
13.	"Waiting Man" (2016 Stereo Mix)	4:26
14.	"Neurotica" (2016 Stereo Mix)	4:49
15.	"Two Hands" (2016 Stereo Mix)	3:23
16.	"The Howler" (2016 Stereo Mix)	4:12
17.	"Requiem (Extended Version)" (2016 Stereo Mix)	12:11
18.	"Absent Lovers" (2016 Stereo Mix – Bonus Track – Instrumental, Studio Recording)	4:13
19.	"Neal And Jack And Me" (30th Anniversary Remaster)	4:24
20.	"Heartbeat" (30th Anniversary Remaster)	3:55
21.	"Sartori In Tangier" (30th Anniversary Remaster)	3:34
22.	"Waiting Man" (30th Anniversary Remaster)	4:24
23.	"Neurotica" (30th Anniversary Remaster)	4:50
24.	"Two Hands" (30th Anniversary Remaster)	3:24
25.	"The Howler" (30th Anniversary Remaster)	4:12
26.	"Requiem" (30th Anniversary Remaster)	6:37
27.	"Neal And Jack And Me" (Alternate Album)	4:24
28.	"Heartbeat" (Alternate Album)	3:55
29.	"Sartori In Tangier" (Alternate Album)	3:32
30.	"Waiting Man" (Alternate Album)	4:23
31.	"Neurotica" (Alternate Album)	4:18
32.	"Two Hands" (Alternate Album)	3:24
33.	"The Howler" (Alternate Album)	3:48
34.	"Requiem" (Alternate Album)	6:38
35.	"Neal And Jack And Me" (Alternate Album – Alt. Take)	6:16
36.	"Absent Lovers" (Alternate Album – Live, Oxford)	4:57
37.	"Heartbeat" (Video Content – Studio)	4:01
38.	"Waiting Man" (Video Content – Live At Alabamahalle, Munich – Widescreen Format, Stereo)	9:40
39.	"Matte Kudasai" (Video Content – Live At Alabamahalle, Munich – Widescreen Format, Stereo)	3:47
40.	"The Sheltering Sky" (Video Content – Live At Alabamahalle, Munich – Widescreen Format, Stereo)	10:47
41.	"Neal And Jack And Me" (Video Content – Live At Alabamahalle, Munich – Widescreen Format, Stereo)	5:40
42.	"Indiscipline" (Video Content – Live At Alabamahalle, Munich – Widescreen Format, Stereo)	7:17
43.	"Heartbeat" (Video Content – Live At Alabamahalle, Munich – Widescreen Format, Stereo)	4:16

On (and off) The Road, Disc 15 (Blu-ray Audio 3): Three Of A Perfect Pair 2016 Surround Mix/2016 Stereo Mix/30th Anniversary Remaster etc
No.	Title	Length
1.	"Three Of A Perfect Pair" (2016 Surround Mix)	4:22
2.	"Model Man" (2016 Surround Mix)	4:01
3.	"Sleepless" (2016 Surround Mix)	5:35
4.	"Man With An Open Heart" (2016 Surround Mix)	3:07
5.	"Nuages (That Which Passes, Passes Like Clouds)" (2016 Surround Mix)	4:47
6.	"Industry" (2016 Surround Mix)	7:04
7.	"Dig Me" (2016 Surround Mix)	3:16
8.	"No Warning" (2016 Surround Mix)	3:29
9.	"Larks' Tongues In Aspic Part III" (2016 Surround Mix)	6:07
10.	"The King Crimson Barber Shop" (2016 Surround Mix – Bonus Tracks)	1:38
11.	"Robert's Ballad" (2016 Surround Mix – Bonus Tracks)	3:22
12.	"Three Of A Perfect Pair" (2016 Stereo Mix)	4:22
13.	"Model Man" (2016 Stereo Mix)	4:01
14.	"Sleepless" (2016 Stereo Mix)	5:35
15.	"Man With An Open Heart" (2016 Stereo Mix)	3:07
16.	"Nuages (That Which Passes, Passes Like Clouds)" (2016 Stereo Mix)	4:47
17.	"Industry" (2016 Stereo Mix)	7:04
18.	"Dig Me" (2016 Stereo Mix)	3:16
19.	"No Warning" (2016 Stereo Mix)	3:29
20.	"Larks' Tongues In Aspic Part III" (2016 Stereo Mix)	6:07
21.	"The King Crimson Barber Shop" (2016 Stereo Mix – Bonus Tracks)	1:38
22.	"Robert's Ballad" (2016 Stereo Mix – Bonus Tracks)	3:22
23.	"Shidare Zakura" (2016 Stereo Mix – Bonus Tracks)	2:41
24.	"Industrial Zone A" (2016 Stereo Mix – Bonus Tracks)	3:15
25.	"Industrial Zone B" (2016 Stereo Mix – Bonus Tracks)	5:34
26.	"Industrial Zone C" (2016 Stereo Mix – Bonus Tracks)	15:50
27.	"Three Of A Perfect Pair" (30th Anniversary Remaster – Left Side)	4:13
28.	"Model Man" (30th Anniversary Remaster – Left Side)	3:49
29.	"Sleepless" (30th Anniversary Remaster – Left Side)	5:23
30.	"Man With An Open Heart" (30th Anniversary Remaster – Left Side)	3:06
31.	"Nuages (That Which Passes, Passes Like Clouds)" (30th Anniversary Remaster – Left Side)	4:46
32.	"Industry" (30th Anniversary Remaster – Right Side)	7:06
33.	"Dig Me" (30th Anniversary Remaster – Right Side)	3:16
34.	"No Warning" (30th Anniversary Remaster – Right Side)	3:29
35.	"Larks' Tongues In Aspic Part III" (30th Anniversary Remaster – Right Side)	6:05
36.	"The King Crimson Barber Shop" (30th Anniversary Remaster – Other Side)	1:38
37.	"Industrial Zone A" (30th Anniversary Remaster – Other Side)	1:43
38.	"Industrial Zone B" (30th Anniversary Remaster – Other Side)	4:32
39.	"Sleepless" (30th Anniversary Remaster – Other Side – Tony Levin Mix)	7:27
40.	"Sleepless" (30th Anniversary Remaster – Other Side – Bob Clearmountain Mix)	5:24
41.	"Sleepless" (30th Anniversary Remaster – Other Side – Dance Mix – F. Kevorkian)	6:19
42.	"Sleepless" (Video Content – Promotional Video)	3:41
43.	"Entry Of The Crims" (Absent Lovers – Live at The Spectrum, Montreal, 11 July 1984 – Stereo Mix)	6:29
44.	"Larks' Tongues In Aspic Part III" (Absent Lovers – Live at The Spectrum, Montreal, 11 July 1984 – Stereo Mix)	5:06
45.	"Thela Hun Ginjeet" (Absent Lovers – Live at The Spectrum, Montreal, 11 July 1984 – Stereo Mix)	7:06
46.	"Red" (Absent Lovers – Live at The Spectrum, Montreal, 11 July 1984 – Stereo Mix)	5:48
47.	"Matte Kudasai" (Absent Lovers – Live at The Spectrum, Montreal, 11 July 1984 – Stereo Mix)	3:46
48.	"Industry" (Absent Lovers – Live at The Spectrum, Montreal, 11 July 1984 – Stereo Mix)	7:30
49.	"Dig Me" (Absent Lovers – Live at The Spectrum, Montreal, 11 July 1984 – Stereo Mix)	3:59
50.	"Three Of A Perfect Pair" (Absent Lovers – Live at The Spectrum, Montreal, 11 July 1984 – Stereo Mix)	4:30
51.	"Indiscipline" (Absent Lovers – Live at The Spectrum, Montreal, 11 July 1984 – Stereo Mix)	8:10
52.	"Sartori In Tangier" (Absent Lovers – Live at The Spectrum, Montreal, 11 July 1984 – Stereo Mix)	4:38
53.	"Frame By Frame" (Absent Lovers – Live at The Spectrum, Montreal, 11 July 1984 – Stereo Mix)	3:57
54.	"Man With An Open Heart" (Absent Lovers – Live at The Spectrum, Montreal, 11 July 1984 – Stereo Mix)	3:45
55.	"Waiting Man" (Absent Lovers – Live at The Spectrum, Montreal, 11 July 1984 – Stereo Mix)	6:27
56.	"Sleepless" (Absent Lovers – Live at The Spectrum, Montreal, 11 July 1984 – Stereo Mix)	6:07
57.	"Larks' Tongues In Aspic Part II" (Absent Lovers – Live at The Spectrum, Montreal, 11 July 1984 – Stereo Mix)	7:54
58.	"Discipline" (Absent Lovers – Live at The Spectrum, Montreal, 11 July 1984 – Stereo Mix)	5:04
59.	"Heartbeat" (Absent Lovers – Live at The Spectrum, Montreal, 11 July 1984 – Stereo Mix)	5:15
60.	"Elephant Talk" (Absent Lovers – Live at The Spectrum, Montreal, 11 July 1984 – Stereo Mix)	8:57
61.	"Entry Of The Crims" (Absent Lovers – Live at The Spectrum, Montreal, 11 July 1984 – 5.1 Surround Mix)	6:29
62.	"Larks' Tongues In Aspic Part III" (Absent Lovers – Live at The Spectrum, Montreal, 11 July 1984 – 5.1 Surround Mix)	5:06
63.	"Thela Hun Ginjeet" (Absent Lovers – Live at The Spectrum, Montreal, 11 July 1984 – 5.1 Surround Mix)	7:06
64.	"Red" (Absent Lovers – Live at The Spectrum, Montreal, 11 July 1984 – 5.1 Surround Mix)	5:48
65.	"Matte Kudasai" (Absent Lovers – Live at The Spectrum, Montreal, 11 July 1984 – 5.1 Surround Mix)	3:46
66.	"Industry" (Absent Lovers – Live at The Spectrum, Montreal, 11 July 1984 – 5.1 Surround Mix)	7:30
67.	"Dig Me" (Absent Lovers – Live at The Spectrum, Montreal, 11 July 1984 – 5.1 Surround Mix)	3:59
68.	"Three Of A Perfect Pair" (Absent Lovers – Live at The Spectrum, Montreal, 11 July 1984 – 5.1 Surround Mix)	4:30
69.	"Indiscipline" (Absent Lovers – Live at The Spectrum, Montreal, 11 July 1984 – 5.1 Surround Mix)	8:10
70.	"Sartori In Tangier" (Absent Lovers – Live at The Spectrum, Montreal, 11 July 1984 – 5.1 Surround Mix)	4:38
71.	"Frame By Frame" (Absent Lovers – Live at The Spectrum, Montreal, 11 July 1984 – 5.1 Surround Mix)	3:57
72.	"Man With An Open Heart" (Absent Lovers – Live at The Spectrum, Montreal, 11 July 1984 – 5.1 Surround Mix)	3:45
73.	"Waiting Man" (Absent Lovers – Live at The Spectrum, Montreal, 11 July 1984 – 5.1 Surround Mix)	6:27
74.	"Sleepless" (Absent Lovers – Live at The Spectrum, Montreal, 11 July 1984 – 5.1 Surround Mix)	6:07
75.	"Larks' Tongues In Aspic Part II" (Absent Lovers – Live at The Spectrum, Montreal, 11 July 1984 – 5.1 Surround Mix)	7:54
76.	"Discipline" (Absent Lovers – Live at The Spectrum, Montreal, 11 July 1984 – 5.1 Surround Mix)	5:04
77.	"Heartbeat" (Absent Lovers – Live at The Spectrum, Montreal, 11 July 1984 – 5.1 Surround Mix)	5:15
78.	"Elephant Talk" (Absent Lovers – Live at The Spectrum, Montreal, 11 July 1984 – 5.1 Surround Mix)	8:57
79.	"No Warning" (Video Content – Three Of A Perfect Pair Live In Japan – Widescreen Format, Stereo)	8:57
80.	"Larks' Tongues In Aspic Part III" (Video Content – Three Of A Perfect Pair Live In Japan – Widescreen Format, Stereo)	5:20
81.	"Thela Hun Ginjeet" (Video Content – Three Of A Perfect Pair Live In Japan – Widescreen Format, Stereo)	5:51
82.	"Back Stage" (Video Content – Three Of A Perfect Pair Live In Japan – Widescreen Format, Stereo)	2:27
83.	"Frame By Frame" (Video Content – Three Of A Perfect Pair Live In Japan – Widescreen Format, Stereo)	3:59
84.	"Matte Kudasai" (Video Content – Three Of A Perfect Pair Live In Japan – Widescreen Format, Stereo)	3:32
85.	"Industry" (Video Content – Three Of A Perfect Pair Live In Japan – Widescreen Format, Stereo)	6:54
86.	"Dig Me" (Video Content – Three Of A Perfect Pair Live In Japan – Widescreen Format, Stereo)	3:31
87.	"Three Of A Perfect Pair" (Video Content – Three Of A Perfect Pair Live In Japan – Widescreen Format, Stereo)	4:32
88.	"Indiscipline" (Video Content – Three Of A Perfect Pair Live In Japan – Widescreen Format, Stereo)	8:54
89.	"Street Movie (Three Of A Perfect Pair)" (Video Content – Three Of A Perfect Pair Live In Japan – Widescreen Format, Stereo)	3:02
90.	"Sartori In Tangier" (Video Content – Three Of A Perfect Pair Live In Japan – Widescreen Format, Stereo)	4:41
91.	"Man With An Open Heart" (Video Content – Three Of A Perfect Pair Live In Japan – Widescreen Format, Stereo)	3:43
92.	"Waiting Man" (Video Content – Three Of A Perfect Pair Live In Japan – Widescreen Format, Stereo)	7:10
93.	"Sleepless" (Video Content – Three Of A Perfect Pair Live In Japan – Widescreen Format, Stereo)	6:02
94.	"Larks' Tongues In Aspic Part II" (Video Content – Three Of A Perfect Pair Live In Japan – Widescreen Format, Stereo)	9:19
95.	"Discipline" (Video Content – Three Of A Perfect Pair Live In Japan – Widescreen Format, Stereo)	4:28
96.	"Elephant Talk" (Video Content – Three Of A Perfect Pair Live In Japan – Widescreen Format, Stereo)	5:53
97.	"Heartbeat" (Video Content – Three Of A Perfect Pair Live In Japan – Widescreen Format, Stereo)	8:39
98.	"Indiscipline" (Video Content – Japan April 1984 – Part Show – Incomplete)	2:27
99.	"Sartori In Tangier" (Video Content – Japan April 1984 – Part Show)	4:27
100.	"Man With An Open Heart" (Video Content – Japan April 1984 – Part Show)	3:46
101.	"Waiting Man" (Video Content – Japan April 1984 – Part Show)	7:15
102.	"Sleepless" (Video Content – Japan April 1984 – Part Show)	8:10
103.	"Larks' Tongues In Aspic Part II" (Video Content – Japan April 1984 – Part Show)	8:55
104.	"Discipline" (Video Content – Japan April 1984 – Part Show)	4:28
105.	"Elephant Talk" (Video Content – Japan April 1984 – Part Show)	7:16
106.	"Heartbeat" (Video Content – Japan April 1984 – Part Show)	5:2
107.	"Man With An Open Heart" (Video Content – Japan 29 April 1984 – Single Camera – Incomplete)	3:02
108.	"Waiting Man" (Video Content – Japan 29 April 1984 – Single Camera)	7:15
109.	"Sleepless" (Video Content – Japan 29 April 1984 – Single Camera)	8:09
110.	"Larks' Tongues In Aspic Part II" (Video Content – Japan 29 April 1984 – Single Camera)	8:56
111.	"Discipline" (Video Content – Japan 29 April 1984 – Single Camera)	4:28
112.	"Elephant Talk" (Video Content – Japan 29 April 1984 – Single Camera)	7:17
113.	"Heartbeat" (Video Content – Japan 29 April 1984 – Single Camera)	5:43
114.	"Waiting Man" (Video Content – Japan 30 April 1984 – Single Camera – Incomplete)	5:15
115.	"Sleepless" (Video Content – Japan 30 April 1984 – Single Camera)	6:02
116.	"Larks' Tongues In Aspic Part II" (Video Content – Japan 30 April 1984 – Single Camera)	9:19
117.	"Discipline" (Video Content – Japan 30 April 1984 – Single Camera)	4:27
118.	"Elephant Talk" (Video Content – Japan 30 April 1984 – Single Camera)	5:52
119.	"Heartbeat" (Video Content – Japan 30 April 1984 – Single Camera)	8:23

On (and off) The Road, Disc 16: Live at Moles Club, Bath – audience cassette recording of 30 April 1981
No.	Title	Length
1.	"Discipline"	5:57
2.	"Thela Hun Ginjeet"	5:42
3.	"Red"	6:10
4.	"Elephant Talk"	4:47
5.	"Matte Kudasai"	3:43
6.	"The Sheltering Sky"	8:49
7.	"Indiscipline"	7:01
8.	"Frame By Frame"	5:01
9.	"Larks' Tongues In Aspic Part II"	6:35

On (and off) The Road, Disc 17: Europe 1982, from the concert in The Arena, Frejus, 27 August 1982
No.	Title	Length
1.	"Thela Hun Ginjeet"	7:07
2.	"Matte Kudasai"	3:32
3.	"Indiscipline"	10:10
4.	"Heartbeat"	4:10
5.	"The Sheltering Sky"	10:39
6.	"Larks' Tongues In Aspic Part II"	7:22
7.	"Waiting Man"	8:34
8.	"Red"	6:00
9.	"Neal And Jack And Me"	5:48
10.	"Elephant Talk"	5:23

On (and off) The Road, Disc 18 (DVD 1): More Neal And Jack And Me
No.	Title	Length
1.	"Waiting Man" (Video Content – The Noise – Live In Frejus – 4:3 Standard Definition Format, Stereo & 5.1 Surround)	8:38
2.	"Matte Kudasai" (Video Content – The Noise – Live In Frejus – 4:3 Standard Definition Format, Stereo & 5.1 Surround)	3:33
3.	"The Sheltering Sky" (Video Content – The Noise – Live In Frejus – 4:3 Standard Definition Format, Stereo & 5.1 Surround)	11:02
4.	"Neal And Jack And Me" (Video Content – The Noise – Live In Frejus – :3 Standard Definition Format, Stereo & 5.1 Surround)	5:49
5.	"Indiscipline" (Video Content – The Noise – Live In Frejus – 4:3 Standard Definition Format, Stereo & 5.1 Surround)	11:00
6.	"Heartbeat" (Video Content – The Noise – Live In Frejus – 4:3 Standard Definition Format, Stereo & 5.1 Surround)	4:19
7.	"Larks' Tongues In Aspic Part II" (Video Content – The Noise – Live In Frejus – 4:3 Standard Definition Format, Stereo & 5.1 Surround)	6:51
8.	"No Warning" (Video Content – Three Of A Perfect Pair – Live In Japan – 4:3 Standard Definition Format, Stereo & 5.1 Surround)	4:04
9.	"Larks' Tongues In Aspic Part III" (Video Content – Three Of A Perfect Pair – Live In Japan – 4:3 Standard Definition Format, Stereo & 5.1 Surround)	5:20
10.	"Thela Hun Ginjeet" (Video Content – Three Of A Perfect Pair – Live In Japan – 4:3 Standard Definition Format, Stereo & 5.1 Surround)	5:50
11.	"Back Stage" (Video Content – Three Of A Perfect Pair – Live In Japan – 4:3 Standard Definition Format, Stereo & 5.1 Surround)	2:27
12.	"Frame By Frame" (Video Content – Three Of A Perfect Pair – Live In Japan – 4:3 Standard Definition Format, Stereo & 5.1 Surround)	3:59
13.	"Matte Kudasai" (Video Content – Three Of A Perfect Pair – Live In Japan – 4:3 Standard Definition Format, Stereo & 5.1 Surround)	3:32
14.	"Industry" (Video Content – Three Of A Perfect Pair – Live In Japan – 4:3 Standard Definition Format, Stereo & 5.1 Surround)	6:54
15.	"Dig Me" (Video Content – Three Of A Perfect Pair – Live In Japan – 4:3 Standard Definition Format, Stereo & 5.1 Surround)	3:31
16.	"Three Of A Perfect Pair" (Video Content – Three Of A Perfect Pair – Live In Japan – 4:3 Standard Definition Format, Stereo & 5.1 Surround)	4:32
17.	"Indiscipline" (Video Content – Three Of A Perfect Pair – Live In Japan – 4:3 Standard Definition Format, Stereo & 5.1 Surround)	8:53
18.	"Street Movie (Three Of A Perfect Pair)" (Video Content – Three Of A Perfect Pair – Live In Japan – 4:3 Standard Definition Format, Stereo & 5.1 Surround)	3:02
19.	"Sartori In Tangier" (Video Content – Three Of A Perfect Pair – Live In Japan – 4:3 Standard Definition Format, Stereo & 5.1 Surround)	4:51
20.	"Man With An Open Heart" (Video Content – Three Of A Perfect Pair – Live In Japan – 4:3 Standard Definition Format, Stereo & 5.1 Surround)	3:43
21.	"Waiting Man" (Video Content – Three Of A Perfect Pair – Live In Japan – 4:3 Standard Definition Format, Stereo & 5.1 Surround)	7:10
22.	"Sleepless" (Video Content – Three Of A Perfect Pair – Live In Japan – 4:3 Standard Definition Format, Stereo & 5.1 Surround)	6:02
23.	"Larks' Tongues In Aspic Part II" (Video Content – Three Of A Perfect Pair – Live In Japan – 4:3 Standard Definition Format, Stereo & 5.1 Surround)	9:18
24.	"Discipline" (Video Content – Three Of A Perfect Pair – Live In Japan – 4:3 Standard Definition Format, Stereo & 5.1 Surround)	4:27
25.	"Elephant Talk" (Video Content – Three Of A Perfect Pair – Live In Japan – 4:3 Standard Definition Format, Stereo & 5.1 Surround)	5:53
26.	"Heartbeat" (Video Content – Three Of A Perfect Pair – Live In Japan – 4:3 Standard Definition Format, Stereo & 5.1 Surround)	8:32

On (and off) The Road, Disc 19 (DVD 2): The Town And The City
No.	Title	Length
1.	"Thela Hun Ginjeet" (Live in Philadelphia, 1982)	7:17
2.	"Red" (Live in Philadelphia, 1982)	5:57
3.	"The Howler" (Live in Philadelphia, 1982)	4:45
4.	"Frame By Frame" (Live in Philadelphia, 1982)	4:57
5.	"Matte Kudasai" (Live in Philadelphia, 1982)	3:40
6.	"The Sheltering Sky" (Live in Philadelphia, 1982)	9:29
7.	"Discipline" (Live in Philadelphia, 1982)	5:23
8.	"Elephant Talk" (Live in Philadelphia, 1982)	5:09
9.	"Indiscipline" (Live in Philadelphia, 1982)	11:14
10.	"Neurotica" (Live in Philadelphia, 1982)	6:30
11.	"Heartbeat" (Live in Philadelphia, 1982)	4:18
12.	"Sartori In Tangier" (Live in Philadelphia, 1982)	4:22
13.	"Larks' Tongues In Aspic Part II" (Live in Philadelphia, 1982 Here)	6:44
14.	"Waiting Man" (Live in Asbury Park, 1982)	10:36
15.	"Thela Hun Ginjeet" (Live in Asbury Park, 1982)	7:49
16.	"Red" (Live in Asbury Park, 1982)	6:16
17.	"The Howler" (Live in Asbury Park, 1982)	5:02
18.	"Frame By Frame" (Live in Asbury Park, 1982)	2:53
19.	"Matte Kudasai" (Live in Asbury Park, 1982)	3:51
20.	"The Sheltering Sky" (Live in Asbury Park, 1982)	10:34
21.	"Neal And Jack And Me" (Live in Asbury Park, 1982)	5:47
22.	"Discipline" (Live in Asbury Park, 1982)	5:20
23.	"Elephant Talk" (Live in Asbury Park, 1982)	5:09
24.	"Indiscipline" (Live in Asbury Park, 1982)	11:26
25.	"Neurotica" (Live in Asbury Park, 1982)	5:49
26.	"Heartbeat" (Live in Asbury Park, 1982)	4:11
27.	"Sartori In Tangier" (Live in Asbury Park, 1982)	4:39
28.	"Larks' Tongues In Aspic Part II" (Live in Asbury Park, 1982)	8:17
29.	"Waiting Man" (Live in Cap D'Agde, 1982)	8:48
30.	"Thela Hun Ginjeet" (Live in Cap D'Agde, 1982)	6:25
31.	"Red" (Live in Cap D'Agde, 1982)	6:01
32.	"Matte Kudasai" (Live in Cap D'Agde, 1982)	3:57
33.	"The Sheltering Sky" (Live in Cap D'Agde, 1982)	9:48
34.	"Neal And Jack And Me" (Live in Cap D'Agde, 1982)	5:39
35.	"Elephant Talk" (Live in Cap D'Agde, 1982)	4:57
36.	"Indiscipline" (Live in Cap D'Agde, 1982)	9:01
37.	"Waiting Man" (Live in Frejus, 1982)	8:43
38.	"Thela Hun Ginjeet" (Live in Frejus, 1982)	7:23
39.	"Red" (Live in Frejus, 1982)	6:07
40.	"Matte Kudasai" (Live in Frejus, 1982)	3:32
41.	"The Sheltering Sky" (Live in Frejus, 1982)	11:09
42.	"Neal And Jack And Me" (Live in Frejus, 1982)	5:48
43.	"Elephant Talk" (Live in Frejus, 1982)	5:23
44.	"Indiscipline" (Live in Frejus, 1982)	11:13
45.	"Heartbeat" (Live in Frejus, 1982)	4:07
46.	"Larks' Tongues In Aspic Part II" (Live in Frejus, 1982)	6:49
47.	"Thela Hun Ginjeet" (Live in Europe, 1982)	7:10
48.	"Matte Kudasai" (Live in Europe, 1982)	3:31
49.	"Indiscipline" (Live in Europe, 1982)	10:09
50.	"Heartbeat" (Live in Europe, 1982)	4:11
51.	"The Sheltering Sky" (Live in Europe, 1982)	10:40
52.	"Larks' Tongues In Aspic Part II" (Live in Europe, 1982)	7:12
53.	"Waiting Man" (Video Content – Live At Alabamahalle – 4:3 Standard Definition Format, Stereo)	9:42
54.	"Matte Kudasai" (Video Content – Live At Alabamahalle – 4:3 Standard Definition Format, Stereo)	3:45
55.	"The Sheltering Sky" (Video Content – Live At Alabamahalle – 4:3 Standard Definition Format, Stereo)	10:45
56.	"Neal And Jack And Me" (Video Content – Live At Alabamahalle – 4:3 Standard Definition Format, Stereo)	5:41
57.	"Indiscipline" (Video Content – Live At Alabamahalle – 4:3 Standard Definition Format, Stereo)	7:17
58.	"Heartbeat" (Video Content – Live At Alabamahalle – 4:3 Standard Definition Format, Stereo)	4:17

== Personnel ==
King Crimson

- Adrian Belew – guitar, lead vocals
- Robert Fripp – guitar
- Tony Levin – bass guitar, Chapman Stick, backing vocals
- Bill Bruford – drums, percussion
