= Neal and Jack and Me (King Crimson DVD) =

Video by King Crimson
- Released: 2004
- Recorded: The Arena, Fréjus, France, 27 August 1982; Gotanda-Kanihoken-Hall, Tokyo, Japan, 29–30 April 1984
- Genre: Progressive rock, new wave
- Label: Discipline Global Mobile

King Crimson chronology
| Eyes Wide Open (2003) | Neal and Jack and Me (2004) |

Professional ratings
Review scores
| Source | Rating |
|---|---|
| Allmusic | 4/5 stars |
| Classic Rock | 4/5 stars |
| All About Jazz | (favorable) |

Neal and Jack and Me is a live DVD by the band King Crimson, released in 2004. It is a compilation of two concerts by the band from the 1980s, The Noise: Live in Frejus and Three of a Perfect Pair: Live in Japan. Both concert videos were originally released on Betamax and VHS.

== Track listing ==
=== Three of a Perfect Pair: Live in Japan 1984 ===
1. "Three of a Perfect Pair"
2. "No Warning"
3. "Larks' Tongues in Aspic Part III"
4. "Thela Hun Ginjeet"
5. "Frame by Frame"
6. "Matte Kudasai"
7. "Industry"
8. "Dig Me"
9. "Indiscipline"
10. "Satori in Tangier"
11. "Man with an Open Heart"
12. "Waiting Man"
13. "Sleepless"
14. "Larks' Tongues in Aspic Part II"
15. "Elephant Talk"
16. "Heartbeat"

=== The Noise: Live in Frejus 1982 ===
1. "Waiting Man"
2. "Matte Kudasai"
3. "The Sheltering Sky"
4. "Neal and Jack and Me"
5. "Indiscipline"
6. "Heartbeat"
7. "Larks' Tongues in Aspic Part II"

=== Extras ===
1. "Sleepless" Music Video 1984
2. "Tony's Road Photos"
3. "King Crimson 1981–1984 Discography"

== Personnel ==
- Adrian Belew – guitar and vocals, drums on "Indiscipline" and "Waiting Man" (Live in Japan 1984)
- Robert Fripp – guitar
- Tony Levin – Chapman Stick, bass guitar
- Bill Bruford – drums, percussion
