= Heaven & Earth (box set) =

Heaven & Earth (Live and in the Studio 1997–2008)

Box set by King Crimson
- Released: 2019
- Recorded: 1997–2008 (live); 1998–2003 (studio)
- Genres: Progressive rock and heavy metal
- Labels: Discipline Global Mobile; Panegyric; Inner Knot; Wowow Entertainment, Inc.
- Producer: King Crimson

King Crimson chronology
Sailors' Tales (1970–1972) (2017)	Heaven & Earth (Live and in the Studio 1997–2008) (2019)	The Complete 1969 Recordings (2020)

Heaven & Earth (Live and in the Studio 1997–2008) is the eighth of the major box set releases from English progressive rock group King Crimson, released in 2019 by Discipline Global Mobile, Panegyric Records, Inner Knot & Wowow Entertainment, Inc.

This compilation covers the period which saw the recording of The Construkction of Light, released in 2000 and the album that appears to be their studio swan-song The Power to Believe, from 2003; this boxed set documents yet another change of artistic direction.

Heaven & Earth features re-mixed and master examples of the above two albums with previously unheard studio recordings and much more live material from the same period.

Across 18 CDs, 4 blu-ray discs (1 video and 3 audio content) and 2 DVDs (all audio content), with booklet containing sleeve-notes by Sid Smith, Robert Fripp and David Singleton. It also includes memorabilia.

== Reception ==
Professional ratings
Review scores
Source	Rating
allaboutjazz	4.5/5 stars

John Kelman of allaboutjazz was again complimentary regarding this particular set and commented that "A perfect summary to Heaven & Earth, the King Crimson box set that squeezes the most material onto any of the group's mega-box set, covers the longest time period and documents Crimson's most extensive period of experimentation, exploration and evolution through its inclusion of (almost) all ProjeKct recordings through Crimson's brief 2008 return, alongside the best-sounding versions of The (Re)ConstruKction of Light and The Power to Believe."

== Speed issues ==
Certain items on discs 19 and 21 run at an incorrect, 9% faster speed on Heaven & Earth than when originally recorded and released, resulting in a higher pitch and shorter track times. The albums affected are: ProjeKct One - Dec 4 1997 Jazz Cafe London, ProjeKct Two - Space Groove, ProjeKct One - Live At The Jazz Cafe, ProjeKct Two - Live Groove, ProjeKct Three - Masque, ProjeKct Four - West Coast Live, ProjeKct One - Jazz Cafe Suite, ProjeKct X - Heaven And Earth, BPM&M - XtraKcts & ArtifaKcts, Bill Rieflin, Robert Fripp & Trey Gunn - The Repercussions Of Angelic Behavior. Discipline Global Mobile provided corrected files to box owners via the DGMLive website.

== Track listing ==
Heaven & Earth, Disc 1: The ReconstruKction of Light (1999 with new overdubs) 2019 Stereo Mix
No.	Title	Group	Length
1.	"ProzaKc Blues"	King Crimson
2.	"The ConstruKction Of Light (part 1)"	King Crimson
3.	"The ConstruKction Of Light (part 2)"	King Crimson
4.	"Into The Frying Pan Intro"	King Crimson
5.	"Into The Frying Pan"	King Crimson
6.	"FraKctured"	King Crimson
7.	"The World's My Oyster Soup Kitchen Floor Wax Museum"	King Crimson
8.	"Larks' Tongues In Aspic: Part IV (part 1)"	King Crimson
9.	"Larks' Tongues In Aspic: Part IV (part 2)"	King Crimson
10.	"Larks' Tongues In Aspic: Part IV (part 3)"	King Crimson
11.	"Coda: I Have A Dream"	King Crimson
12.	"Heaven And Earth"	ProjeKct X

Heaven & Earth, Disc 2: Happy With What You Have To Be Happy With / Level Five 2019 Stereo Mix
No.	Title	Group	Length
1.	"Bude"	King Crimson
2.	"Happy With What You Have To Be Happy With"	King Crimson
3.	"Mie Gakure"	King Crimson
4.	"She Shudders"	King Crimson
5.	"Eyes Wide Open" (Acoustic Version)	King Crimson
6.	"ShoGaNai"	King Crimson
7.	"I Ran"	King Crimson
8.	"Potato Pie"	King Crimson
9.	"Larks' Tongues In Aspic: Part IV"	King Crimson
10.	"Clouds"	King Crimson
11.	"Einstein's Relatives"	King Crimson
12.	"Dangerous Curves"	King Crimson
13.	"Level Five"	King Crimson
14.	"Virtuous Circle"	King Crimson
15.	"The ConstruKction Of Light"	King Crimson
16.	"The Deception Of The Thrush"	King Crimson
17.	"Improv: ProjeKct X"	King Crimson

Heaven & Earth, Disc 3: The Power to Believe (2002) 2019 Stereo Mix + Bonus tracks
No.	Title	Group	Length
1.	"The Power To Believe I: A Cappella"	King Crimson
2.	"Level Five"	King Crimson
3.	"Eyes Wide Open"	King Crimson
4.	"EleKtriK"	King Crimson
5.	"Facts Of Life: Intro"	King Crimson
6.	"Facts Of Life"	King Crimson
7.	"The Power To Believe II"	King Crimson
8.	"Dangerous Curves"	King Crimson
9.	"Happy With What You Have To Be Happy With"	King Crimson
10.	"The Power To Believe III"	King Crimson
11.	"The Power To Believe IV: Coda"	King Crimson
12.	"Sus-tayn-Z I" (Bonus track)	King Crimson
13.	"Superslow" (Bonus track)	King Crimson
14.	"Sus-tayn-Z II" (Bonus track)	King Crimson

Heaven & Earth, Disc 4: ProjeKct One - London, 1997
No.	Title	Group	Length
1.	"4 i 1"	ProjeKct One
2.	"4 i 2"	ProjeKct One
3.	"4 i 3"	ProjeKct One
4.	"4 i 4"	ProjeKct One
5.	"4 i 6"	ProjeKct One
6.	"4 ii 1"	ProjeKct One
7.	"4 ii 2"	ProjeKct One
8.	"4 ii 4"	ProjeKct One
9.	"4 ii 5"	ProjeKct One
10.	"4 ii 6"	ProjeKct One

Heaven & Earth, Disc 5: ProjeKct Two - Baltimore, 1998
No.	Title	Group	Length
1.	"Introductory Soundscape"	ProjeKct Two
2.	"House I"	ProjeKct Two
3.	"Heavy ConstruKction"	ProjeKct Two
4.	"Vector Drift"	ProjeKct Two
5.	"Light ConstruKction"	ProjeKct Two
6.	"Live Groove"	ProjeKct Two
7.	"X-chayn-jiZ"	ProjeKct Two
8.	"Sector Patrol"	ProjeKct Two
9.	"Vector Shift To Planet Belewbeloid"	ProjeKct Two
10.	"Contrary ConstruKction"	ProjeKct Two
11.	"The Deception Of The Thrush"	ProjeKct Two
12.	"VROOOM"	ProjeKct Two

Heaven & Earth, Disc 6: ProjeKct Four - San Francisco, 1998
No.	Title	Group	Length
1.	"Heavy ConstruKction"	ProjeKct Four
2.	"Improv I"	ProjeKct Four
3.	"ProjeKction"	ProjeKct Four
4.	"The Deception Of The Thrush"	ProjeKct Four
5.	"Hindu Fizz"	ProjeKct Four
6.	"Improv II"	ProjeKct Four
7.	"Seizure"	ProjeKct Four

Heaven & Earth, Disc 7: ProjeKct Three - Austin, 1999
No.	Title	Group	Length
1.	"Masque 3"	ProjeKct Three
2.	"X-chayn-jiZ"	ProjeKct Three
3.	"CCCCCCs"	ProjeKct Three
4.	"Heavy ConstruKction"	ProjeKct Three
5.	"Masque 8"	ProjeKct Three
6.	"Masque 11"	ProjeKct Three
7.	"ProjeKction"	ProjeKct Three
8.	"The Deception Of The Thrush"	ProjeKct Three

Heaven & Earth, Disc 8: Live ConstruKction, 2000 - Part 1
No.	Title	Group	Length
1.	"Improv: Principio Mastelottico (Madrid)"	King Crimson
2.	"ProzaKc Blues"	King Crimson
3.	"Improv: Blasticus SS Blastica"	King Crimson
4.	"The ConstruKction Of Light"	King Crimson
5.	"Improv: Tomorrow Never Knows Thela (incl Tomorrow Never Knows) (Warsaw)"	King Crimson
6.	"Into The Frying Pan"	King Crimson
7.	"Improv: Heaven C Blasticum (Legnano)"	King Crimson

Heaven & Earth, Disc 9: Live ConstruKction, 2000 - Part 2
No.	Title	Group	Length
1.	"Improv: Crim Chill Thrill (San Sebastian)"	King Crimson
2.	"One Time"	King Crimson
3.	"Improv: Mastelotto Maximatamus Est (Conegliano)"	King Crimson
4.	"Three Of A Perfect Pair"	King Crimson
5.	"Improv: El Groovistico SS Blasticus (Barcelona)"	King Crimson
6.	"Sex Sleep Eat Drink Dream"	King Crimson
7.	"Improv: C Chill Unchill (Rome)"	King Crimson
8.	"Cage"	King Crimson

Heaven & Earth, Disc 10: Live ConstruKction, 2000 - Part 3
No.	Title	Group	Length
1.	"Improv: Heaven Groovistica (Copenhagen)"	King Crimson
2.	"The World's My Oyster Soup Kitchen Floor Wax Museum"	King Crimson
3.	"Improv: C Blasticum"	King Crimson
4.	"Larks' Tongues In Aspic: Part IV"	King Crimson
5.	"Improv: Mastelotticus SS Blasticus (Rome)"	King Crimson
6.	"The Deception Of The Thrush"	King Crimson

Heaven & Earth, Disc 11: Live In San Diego, 2001
No.	Title	Group	Length
1.	"The ConstruKction Of Light"	King Crimson
2.	"Into The Frying Pan"	King Crimson
3.	"Level Five"	King Crimson
4.	"The Deception Of the Thrush"	King Crimson
5.	"Dangerous Curves"	King Crimson
6.	"Larks' Tongues In Aspic: Part IV"	King Crimson
7.	"Thela Hun Ginjeet"	King Crimson
8.	"Adrian Announcement"	King Crimson
9.	"Red"	King Crimson

Heaven & Earth, Disc 12: Live In New Haven, 2001 (part 1)
No.	Title	Group	Length
1.	"Introductory Soundscape"	King Crimson
2.	"Dangerous Curves"	King Crimson
3.	"Into The Frying Pan"	King Crimson
4.	"Adrian Announcement"	King Crimson
5.	"EleKtriK"	King Crimson
6.	"The ConstruKction Of Light"	King Crimson
7.	"Dinosaur"	King Crimson
8.	"Thela Hun Ginjeet"	King Crimson

Heaven & Earth, Disc 13: Live In New Haven, 2001 (part 2)
No.	Title	Group	Length
1.	"Virtuous Circle"	King Crimson
2.	"Larks' Tongues In Aspic: Part IV"	King Crimson
3.	"The Deception Of the Thrush"	King Crimson
4.	"Level Five"	King Crimson
5.	"Red"	King Crimson

Heaven & Earth, Disc 14: EleKtriK - Live In Tokyo, 2003
No.	Title	Group	Length
1.	"Introductory Soundscape"	King Crimson
2.	"The Power To Believe I: A Cappella"	King Crimson
3.	"Level Five"	King Crimson
4.	"ProzaKc Blues"	King Crimson
5.	"EleKtriK"	King Crimson
6.	"Happy With What You Have To Be Happy With"	King Crimson
7.	"One Time"	King Crimson
8.	"Facts Of Life"	King Crimson
9.	"The Power To Believe II: Power Circle"	King Crimson
10.	"Dangerous Curves"	King Crimson
11.	"Larks' Tongues In Aspic: Part IV"	King Crimson
12.	"The World's My Oyster Soup Kitchen Floor Wax Museum"	King Crimson

Heaven & Earth, Disc 15: Live In New Haven, 2003 (part 1)
No.	Title	Group	Length
1.	"The Power To Believe I"	King Crimson
2.	"Level Five"	King Crimson
3.	"The ConstruKction Of Light"	King Crimson
4.	"Facts Of Life"	King Crimson
5.	"EleKtriK"	King Crimson
6.	"The Power To Believe II"	King Crimson
7.	"Dinosaur"	King Crimson
8.	"One Time"	King Crimson
9.	"Happy With What You Have To Be Happy With"	King Crimson

Heaven & Earth, Disc 16: Live In New Haven, 2003 (part 2)
No.	Title	Group	Length
1.	"Dangerous Curves"	King Crimson
2.	"Larks' Tongues In Aspic: Part IV"	King Crimson
3.	"The Power To Believe III"	King Crimson
4.	"Elephant Talk"	King Crimson
5.	"RF Announcement"	King Crimson
6.	"Adrian Announcement"	King Crimson
7.	"Red"	King Crimson

Heaven & Earth, Disc 17: Live In New York, 2008 (part 1)
No.	Title	Group	Length
1.	"Introductory Soundscape"	King Crimson
2.	"Drum Duet"	King Crimson
3.	"The ConstruKction Of Light"	King Crimson
4.	"Red"	King Crimson
5.	"Frame By Frame"	King Crimson
6.	"Neurotica"	King Crimson
7.	"Three Of A Perfect Pair"	King Crimson
8.	"Sleepless"	King Crimson
9.	"VROOOM"	King Crimson
10.	"Coda: Marine 475"	King Crimson
11.	"One Time"	King Crimson
12.	"B'Boom"	King Crimson

Heaven & Earth, Disc 18: Live In New York, 2008 (part 2)
No.	Title	Group	Length
1.	"Dinosaur"	King Crimson
2.	"Level Five"	King Crimson
3.	"The Talking Drum"	King Crimson
4.	"Larks' Tongues In Aspic: Part Two"	King Crimson
5.	"Drum Duet"	King Crimson
6.	"Thela Hun Ginjeet"	King Crimson
7.	"Elephant Talk"	King Crimson
8.	"Indiscipline"	King Crimson

Heaven & Earth, Disc 19: DVD-A disc 1 – The ReconstruKction of Light (1999 with new overdubs) - The ConstruKction of Light (1999) - ProjeKct X, Heaven And Earth - all 2019 Mixes -
No.	Title	Group	Length
1.	"ProzaKc Blues" (MLP Lossless 5.1 Surround, DTS 5.1 Digital Surround, MLP Lossless Stereo (24/48), LPCM Stereo (24/48))	King Crimson
2.	"The ConstruKction Of Light (part 1)" (MLP Lossless 5.1 Surround, DTS 5.1 Digital Surround, MLP Lossless Stereo (24/48), LPCM Stereo (24/48))	King Crimson
3.	"The ConstruKction Of Light (part 2)" (MLP Lossless 5.1 Surround, DTS 5.1 Digital Surround, MLP Lossless Stereo (24/48), LPCM Stereo (24/48))	King Crimson
4.	"Into The Frying Pan Intro" (MLP Lossless 5.1 Surround, DTS 5.1 Digital Surround, MLP Lossless Stereo (24/48), LPCM Stereo (24/48))	King Crimson
5.	"Into The Frying Pan" (MLP Lossless 5.1 Surround, DTS 5.1 Digital Surround, MLP Lossless Stereo (24/48), LPCM Stereo (24/48))	King Crimson
6.	"FraKctured" (MLP Lossless 5.1 Surround, DTS 5.1 Digital Surround, MLP Lossless Stereo (24/48), LPCM Stereo (24/48))	King Crimson
7.	"The World's My Oyster Soup Kitchen Floor Wax Museum" (MLP Lossless 5.1 Surround, DTS 5.1 Digital Surround, MLP Lossless Stereo (24/48), LPCM Stereo (24/48))	King Crimson
8.	"Larks' Tongues In Aspic: Part IV (part 1)" (MLP Lossless 5.1 Surround, DTS 5.1 Digital Surround, MLP Lossless Stereo (24/48), LPCM Stereo (24/48))	King Crimson
9.	"Larks' Tongues In Aspic: Part IV (part 2)" (MLP Lossless 5.1 Surround, DTS 5.1 Digital Surround, MLP Lossless Stereo (24/48), LPCM Stereo (24/48))	King Crimson
10.	"Larks' Tongues In Aspic: Part IV (part 3)" (MLP Lossless 5.1 Surround, DTS 5.1 Digital Surround, MLP Lossless Stereo (24/48), LPCM Stereo (24/48))	King Crimson
11.	"Coda: I Have A Dream" (MLP Lossless 5.1 Surround, DTS 5.1 Digital Surround, MLP Lossless Stereo (24/48), LPCM Stereo (24/48))	King Crimson
12.	"Heaven And Earth" (MLP Lossless 5.1 Surround, DTS 5.1 Digital Surround, MLP Lossless Stereo (24/48), LPCM Stereo (24/48))	ProjeKct X
13.	"ProzaKc Blues" (The ConstruKction Of Light - MLP Lossless Stereo (24/48), LPCM Stereo (24/48))	King Crimson
14.	"The ConstruKction Of Light (part 1)" (The ConstruKction Of Light - MLP Lossless Stereo (24/48), LPCM Stereo (24/48))	King Crimson
15.	"The ConstruKction Of Light (part 1)" (The ConstruKction Of Light - MLP Lossless Stereo (24/48), LPCM Stereo (24/48))	King Crimson
16.	"Into The Frying Pan Intro" (The ConstruKction Of Light - MLP Lossless Stereo (24/48), LPCM Stereo (24/48))	King Crimson
17.	"Into The Frying Pan" (The ConstruKction Of Light - MLP Lossless Stereo (24/48), LPCM Stereo (24/48))	King Crimson
18.	"FraKctured" (The ConstruKction Of Light - MLP Lossless Stereo (24/48), LPCM Stereo (24/48))	King Crimson
19.	"The World's My Oyster Soup Kitchen Floor Wax Museum" (The ConstruKction Of Light - MLP Lossless Stereo (24/48), LPCM Stereo (24/48))	King Crimson
20.	"Larks' Tongues In Aspic: Part IV (part 1)" (The ConstruKction Of Light - MLP Lossless Stereo (24/48), LPCM Stereo (24/48))	King Crimson
21.	"Larks' Tongues In Aspic: Part IV (part 2)" (The ConstruKction Of Light - MLP Lossless Stereo (24/48), LPCM Stereo (24/48))	King Crimson
22.	"Larks' Tongues In Aspic: Part IV (part 3)" (The ConstruKction Of Light - MLP Lossless Stereo (24/48), LPCM Stereo (24/48))	King Crimson
23.	"Coda: I Have A Dream" (The ConstruKction Of Light - MLP Lossless Stereo (24/48), LPCM Stereo (24/48))	King Crimson
24.	"Heaven And Earth" (The ConstruKction Of Light - MLP Lossless Stereo (24/48), LPCM Stereo (24/48))	ProjeKct X
25.	"The Business Of Pleasure" (Heaven And Earth - LPCM Stereo (24/48))	ProjeKct X
26.	"Hat In The Middle" (Heaven And Earth - LPCM Stereo (24/48))	ProjeKct X
27.	"Side Window" (Heaven And Earth - LPCM Stereo (24/48))	ProjeKct X
28.	"Maximizer" (Heaven And Earth - LPCM Stereo (24/48))	ProjeKct X
29.	"Strange Ears (Aging Rapidly)" (Heaven And Earth - LPCM Stereo (24/48))	ProjeKct X
30.	"Overhead Floor Mats Under Toe" (Heaven And Earth - LPCM Stereo (24/48))	ProjeKct X
31.	"Six O'Clock" (Heaven And Earth - LPCM Stereo (24/48))	ProjeKct X
32.	"Superbottomfeeder" (Heaven And Earth - LPCM Stereo (24/48))	ProjeKct X
33.	"One E And" (Heaven And Earth - LPCM Stereo (24/48))	ProjeKct X
34.	"Two Awkward Moments" (Heaven And Earth - LPCM Stereo (24/48))	ProjeKct X
35.	"Demolition" (Heaven And Earth - LPCM Stereo (24/48))	ProjeKct X
36.	"Conversation Pit"	ProjeKct X
37.	Untitled (Heaven And Earth - LPCM Stereo (24/48))
38.	"Cin Alayl" (Heaven And Earth - LPCM Stereo (24/48))	ProjeKct X
39.	"Heaven And Earth" (Heaven And Earth - LPCM Stereo (24/48))	ProjeKct X
40.	"Belew Jay Way" (Heaven And Earth - LPCM Stereo (24/48))	ProjeKct X

Heaven & Earth, Disc 20: DVD-A disc 2 – The Power to Believe (2002) 2019 Stereo Mix + additional material
No.	Title	Group	Length
1.	"The Power To Believe I: A Cappella" (MLP Lossless 5.1 Surround, DTS 5.1 Digital Surround, MLP Lossless Stereo (24/48), LPCM Stereo (24/48))	King Crimson
2.	"Level Five" (MLP Lossless 5.1 Surround, DTS 5.1 Digital Surround, MLP Lossless Stereo (24/48), LPCM Stereo (24/48))	King Crimson
3.	"Eyes Wide Open" (MLP Lossless 5.1 Surround, DTS 5.1 Digital Surround, MLP Lossless Stereo (24/48), LPCM Stereo (24/48))	King Crimson
4.	"EleKtriK" (MLP Lossless 5.1 Surround, DTS 5.1 Digital Surround, MLP Lossless Stereo (24/48), LPCM Stereo (24/48))	King Crimson
5.	"Facts Of Life: Intro" (MLP Lossless 5.1 Surround, DTS 5.1 Digital Surround, MLP Lossless Stereo (24/48), LPCM Stereo (24/48))	King Crimson
6.	"Facts Of Life" (MLP Lossless 5.1 Surround, DTS 5.1 Digital Surround, MLP Lossless Stereo (24/48), LPCM Stereo (24/48))	King Crimson
7.	"The Power To Believe II" (MLP Lossless 5.1 Surround, DTS 5.1 Digital Surround, MLP Lossless Stereo (24/48), LPCM Stereo (24/48))	King Crimson
8.	"Dangerous Curves" (MLP Lossless 5.1 Surround, DTS 5.1 Digital Surround, MLP Lossless Stereo (24/48), LPCM Stereo (24/48))	King Crimson
9.	"Happy With What You Have To Be Happy With" (MLP Lossless 5.1 Surround, DTS 5.1 Digital Surround, MLP Lossless Stereo (24/48), LPCM Stereo (24/48))	King Crimson
10.	"The Power To Believe III" (MLP Lossless 5.1 Surround, DTS 5.1 Digital Surround, MLP Lossless Stereo (24/48), LPCM Stereo (24/48))	King Crimson
11.	"The Power To Believe IV: Coda" (MLP Lossless 5.1 Surround, DTS 5.1 Digital Surround, MLP Lossless Stereo (24/48), LPCM Stereo (24/48))	King Crimson
12.	"Sus-tayn-Z I" (Bonus track - MLP Lossless 5.1 Surround, DTS 5.1 Digital Surround, MLP Lossless Stereo (24/48), LPCM Stereo (24/48))	King Crimson
13.	"Superslow" (Bonus track - MLP Lossless 5.1 Surround, DTS 5.1 Digital Surround, MLP Lossless Stereo (24/48), LPCM Stereo (24/48))	King Crimson
14.	"Sus-tayn-Z II" (Bonus track - MLP Lossless 5.1 Surround, DTS 5.1 Digital Surround, MLP Lossless Stereo (24/48), LPCM Stereo (24/48))	King Crimson
15.	"The Power To Believe I: A Cappella" (MLP Lossless Stereo (24/48) LPCM Stereo (24/48))	King Crimson
16.	"Level Five" (MLP Lossless Stereo (24/48) LPCM Stereo (24/48))	King Crimson
17.	"Eyes Wide Open" (MLP Lossless Stereo (24/48) LPCM Stereo (24/48))	King Crimson
18.	"EleKtriK" (MLP Lossless Stereo (24/48) LPCM Stereo (24/48))	King Crimson
19.	"Facts Of Life: Intro" (MLP Lossless Stereo (24/48) LPCM Stereo (24/48))	King Crimson
20.	"Facts Of Life" (MLP Lossless Stereo (24/48) LPCM Stereo (24/48))	King Crimson
21.	"The Power To Believe II" (MLP Lossless Stereo (24/48) LPCM Stereo (24/48))	King Crimson
22.	"Dangerous Curves" (MLP Lossless Stereo (24/48) LPCM Stereo (24/48))	King Crimson
23.	"Happy With What You Have To Be Happy With" (MLP Lossless Stereo (24/48) LPCM Stereo (24/48))	King Crimson
24.	"The Power To Believe III" (MLP Lossless Stereo (24/48) LPCM Stereo (24/48))	King Crimson
25.	"The Power To Believe IV: Coda" (MLP Lossless Stereo (24/48) LPCM Stereo (24/48))	King Crimson
26.	"Bude" (Additional Material - LPCM Stereo (24/48) - Happy With What You Have To Be Happy With)	King Crimson
27.	"Happy With What You Have To Be Happy With" (Additional Material - LPCM Stereo (24/48) - Happy With What You Have To Be Happy With)	King Crimson
28.	"Mie Gakure" (Additional Material - LPCM Stereo (24/48) - Happy With What You Have To Be Happy With)	King Crimson
29.	"She Shudders" (Additional Material - LPCM Stereo (24/48) - Happy With What You Have To Be Happy With)	King Crimson
30.	"Eyes Wide Open" (Additional Material - LPCM Stereo (24/48) - Happy With What You Have To Be Happy With - Acoustic Version)	King Crimson
31.	"ShoGaNai" (Additional Material - LPCM Stereo (24/48) - Happy With What You Have To Be Happy With)	King Crimson
32.	"I Ran" (Additional Material - LPCM Stereo (24/48) - Happy With What You Have To Be Happy With)	King Crimson
33.	"Potato Pie" (Additional Material - LPCM Stereo (24/48) - Happy With What You Have To Be Happy With)	King Crimson
34.	"Larks' Tongues In Aspic: Part IV" (Additional Material - LPCM Stereo (24/48) - Happy With What You Have To Be Happy With)	King Crimson
35.	"Clouds" (Additional Material - LPCM Stereo (24/48) - Happy With What You Have To Be Happy With)	King Crimson
36.	"Einstein's Relatives" (Additional Material - LPCM Stereo (24/48) - Happy With What You Have To Be Happy With)	King Crimson
37.	"Dangerous Curves" (Additional Material - LPCM Stereo (24/48) - Level Five)	King Crimson
38.	"Level Five" (Additional Material - LPCM Stereo (24/48) - Level Five)	King Crimson
39.	"Virtuous Circle" (Additional Material - LPCM Stereo (24/48) - Level Five)	King Crimson
40.	"The ConstruKction Of Light" (Additional Material - LPCM Stereo (24/48) - Level Five)	King Crimson
41.	"The Deception Of The Thrush" (Additional Material - LPCM Stereo (24/48) - Level Five)	King Crimson
42.	"Improv: ProjeKct X" (Additional Material - LPCM Stereo (24/48) - Level Five)	King Crimson

Heaven & Earth, Disc 21: Blu-ray disc 1 – The ProjeKcts Vol. I - LPCM Stereo (24/48)
No.	Title	Group	Length
1.	"1 i 1" (1 December 1997 Jazz Café London)	ProjeKct One
2.	"1 i 2" (1 December 1997 Jazz Café London)	ProjeKct One
3.	"1 i 3" (1 December 1997 Jazz Café London)	ProjeKct One
4.	"1 i 4" (1 December 1997 Jazz Café London)	ProjeKct One
5.	"1 i 5" (1 December 1997 Jazz Café London)	ProjeKct One
6.	"1 i 6" (1 December 1997 Jazz Café London)	ProjeKct One
7.	"1 ii 1" (1 December 1997 Jazz Café London)	ProjeKct One
8.	"1 ii 2" (1 December 1997 Jazz Café London)	ProjeKct One
9.	"1 ii 3" (1 December 1997 Jazz Café London)	ProjeKct One
10.	"1 ii 4" (1 December 1997 Jazz Café London)	ProjeKct One
11.	"1 ii 5" (1 December 1997 Jazz Café London)	ProjeKct One
12.	"1 ii 6" (1 December 1997 Jazz Café London)	ProjeKct One
13.	"1 ii 7" (1 December 1997 Jazz Café London)	ProjeKct One
14.	"2 i 1" (2 December 1997 Jazz Café London)	ProjeKct One
15.	"2 i 2" (2 December 1997 Jazz Café London)	ProjeKct One
16.	"2 i 3" (2 December 1997 Jazz Café London)	ProjeKct One
17.	"2 i 4" (2 December 1997 Jazz Café London)	ProjeKct One
18.	"2 i 5" (2 December 1997 Jazz Café London)	ProjeKct One
19.	"2 i 6" (2 December 1997 Jazz Café London)	ProjeKct One
20.	"2 i 7" (2 December 1997 Jazz Café London)	ProjeKct One
21.	"2 ii 1" (2 December 1997 Jazz Café London)	ProjeKct One
22.	"2 ii 2" (2 December 1997 Jazz Café London)	ProjeKct One
23.	"2 ii 3" (2 December 1997 Jazz Café London)	ProjeKct One
24.	"2 ii 4" (2 December 1997 Jazz Café London)	ProjeKct One
25.	"2 ii 5" (2 December 1997 Jazz Café London)	ProjeKct One
26.	"3 i 1" (3 December 1997 Jazz Café London)	ProjeKct One
27.	"3 i 2" (3 December 1997 Jazz Café London)	ProjeKct One
28.	"3 i 3" (3 December 1997 Jazz Café London)	ProjeKct One
29.	"3 i 4" (3 December 1997 Jazz Café London)	ProjeKct One
30.	"3 i 5" (3 December 1997 Jazz Café London)	ProjeKct One
31.	"3 ii 1" (3 December 1997 Jazz Café London)	ProjeKct One
32.	"3 ii 2" (3 December 1997 Jazz Café London)	ProjeKct One
33.	"3 ii 3" (3 December 1997 Jazz Café London)	ProjeKct One
34.	"3 ii 4" (3 December 1997 Jazz Café London)	ProjeKct One
35.	"3 ii 5" (3 December 1997 Jazz Café London)	ProjeKct One
36.	"3 ii 6" (3 December 1997 Jazz Café London)	ProjeKct One
37.	"3 ii 7" (3 December 1997 Jazz Café London)	ProjeKct One
38.	"4 i 1" (4 December 1997 Jazz Café London)	ProjeKct One
39.	"4 i 2" (4 December 1997 Jazz Café London)	ProjeKct One
40.	"4 i 3" (4 December 1997 Jazz Café London)	ProjeKct One
41.	"4 i 4" (4 December 1997 Jazz Café London)	ProjeKct One
42.	"4 i 5" (4 December 1997 Jazz Café London)	ProjeKct One
43.	"4 i 6" (4 December 1997 Jazz Café London)	ProjeKct One
44.	"Interrupted Announcement" (4 December 1997 Jazz Café London)	ProjeKct One
45.	"4 ii 1" (4 December 1997 Jazz Café London)	ProjeKct One
46.	"4 ii 2" (4 December 1997 Jazz Café London)	ProjeKct One
47.	"4 ii 3" (4 December 1997 Jazz Café London)	ProjeKct One
48.	"4 ii 4" (4 December 1997 Jazz Café London)	ProjeKct One
49.	"4 ii 5" (4 December 1997 Jazz Café London)	ProjeKct One
50.	"4 ii 6" (4 December 1997 Jazz Café London)	ProjeKct One
51.	"Introductory Soundscape" (21 March 1999 Electric Lounge, Austin)	ProjeKct Three
52.	"Hindu Fizz" (21 March 1999 Electric Lounge, Austin)	ProjeKct Three
53.	"Sus tayn" (21 March 1999 Electric Lounge, Austin)	ProjeKct Three
54.	"Foot Note" (21 March 1999 Electric Lounge, Austin)	ProjeKct Three
55.	"X chayn jiZ" (21 March 1999 Electric Lounge, Austin)	ProjeKct Three
56.	"Seizure" (21 March 1999 Electric Lounge, Austin)	ProjeKct Three
57.	"Super Slow Deception Of The Thrush" (21 March 1999 Electric Lounge, Austin)	ProjeKct Three
58.	"ProjeKction" (21 March 1999 Electric Lounge, Austin)	ProjeKct Three
59.	"Heavy ConstruKction" (21 March 1999 Electric Lounge, Austin)	ProjeKct Three
60.	"Introductory Soundscape" (22 March 1999 Cactus Café, Austin - Incomplete)	ProjeKct Three
61.	"Hindu Fizz" (22 March 1999 Cactus Café, Austin)	ProjeKct Three
62.	"Sus tayn Z" (22 March 1999 Cactus Café, Austin)	ProjeKct Three
63.	"Cactus Masque" (22 March 1999 Cactus Café, Austin)	ProjeKct Three
64.	"Super Slow" (22 March 1999 Cactus Café, Austin)	ProjeKct Three
65.	"ProjeKction" (22 March 1999 Cactus Café, Austin)	ProjeKct Three
66.	"Heavy ConstruKction" (22 March 1999 Cactus Café, Austin)	ProjeKct Three
67.	"The Deception Of The Thrush" (22 March 1999 Cactus Café, Austin)	ProjeKct Three
68.	"Masque 3" (23 March 1999 Cactus Café, Austin)	ProjeKct Three
69.	"X Chayn Jiz" (23 March 1999 Cactus Café, Austin)	ProjeKct Three
70.	"CCCCCs" (23 March 1999 Cactus Café, Austin)	ProjeKct Three
71.	"Heavy ConstruKction" (23 March 1999 Cactus Café, Austin)	ProjeKct Three
72.	"Introductory Soundscape" (23 March 1999 Cactus Café, Austin)	ProjeKct Three
73.	"Masque 8" (23 March 1999 Cactus Café, Austin)	ProjeKct Three
74.	"Masque 11" (23 March 1999 Cactus Café, Austin)	ProjeKct Three
75.	"Light ConstruKction" (23 March 1999 Cactus Café, Austin)	ProjeKct Three
76.	"ProjeKction" (23 March 1999 Cactus Café, Austin)	ProjeKct Three
77.	"The Deception Of The Thrush" (23 March 1999 Cactus Café, Austin)	ProjeKct Three
78.	"Masque 1" (24 March 1999 Poor David's, Dallas)	ProjeKct Three
79.	"Contrary ConstruKction" (24 March 1999 Poor David's, Dallas)	ProjeKct Three
80.	"Seizure" (24 March 1999 Poor David's, Dallas)	ProjeKct Three
81.	"The Deception Of The Thrush" (24 March 1999 Poor David's, Dallas)	ProjeKct Three
82.	"Heavy ConstruKction" (24 March 1999 Poor David's, Dallas)	ProjeKct Three
83.	"Introductory Soundscape" (24 March 1999 Poor David's, Dallas)	ProjeKct Three
84.	"Masque 5" (24 March 1999 Poor David's, Dallas)	ProjeKct Three
85.	"Masque 11" (24 March 1999 Poor David's, Dallas)	ProjeKct Three
86.	"Light ConstruKction" (24 March 1999 Poor David's, Dallas)	ProjeKct Three
87.	"ProjeKction" (24 March 1999 Poor David's, Dallas)	ProjeKct Three
88.	"VROOOM" (24 March 1999 Poor David's, Dallas)	ProjeKct Three
89.	"Beatbox" (25 March 1999 Antone's, Austin)	ProjeKct Three
90.	"Super Slow" (25 March 1999 Antone's, Austin)	ProjeKct Three
91.	"X chayn jiZ" (25 March 1999 Antone's, Austin)	ProjeKct Three
92.	"Hindu Fizz" (25 March 1999 Antone's, Austin)	ProjeKct Three
93.	"Heavy ConstruKction" (25 March 1999 Antone's, Austin)	ProjeKct Three
94.	"Introductory Soundscape" (25 March 1999 Antone's, Austin)	ProjeKct Three
95.	"Seven Teas" (25 March 1999 Antone's, Austin)	ProjeKct Three
96.	"Light ConstruKction" (25 March 1999 Antone's, Austin)	ProjeKct Three
97.	"Four Over Five" (25 March 1999 Antone's, Austin)	ProjeKct Three
98.	"Seizure" (25 March 1999 Antone's, Austin)	ProjeKct Three
99.	"ProjeKction" (25 March 1999 Antone's, Austin)	ProjeKct Three
100.	"The Deception Of The Thrush" (25 March 1999 Antone's, Austin)	ProjeKct Three
101.	"Ghost Pt I" (23 October 1998 Fox Theatre, Boulder)	ProjeKct Four
102.	"Seizure" (23 October 1998 Fox Theatre, Boulder)	ProjeKct Four
103.	"Ghost" (23 October 1998 Fox Theatre, Boulder)	ProjeKct Four
104.	"Heavy ConstruKction" (23 October 1998 Fox Theatre, Boulder)	ProjeKct Four
105.	"The Deception Of The Thrush" (23 October 1998 Fox Theatre, Boulder)	ProjeKct Four
106.	"Ghost Pt III" (23 October 1998 Fox Theatre, Boulder)	ProjeKct Four
107.	"Light ConstruKction" (23 October 1998 Fox Theatre, Boulder)	ProjeKct Four
108.	"Ghost Pt I" (24 October 1998 Fox Theatre, Boulder)	ProjeKct Four
109.	"Seizure" (24 October 1998 Fox Theatre, Boulder)	ProjeKct Four
110.	"The Deception Of The Thrush" (24 October 1998 Fox Theatre, Boulder)	ProjeKct Four
111.	"Ghost Pt II" (24 October 1998 Fox Theatre, Boulder)	ProjeKct Four
112.	"Light ConstruKction" (24 October 1998 Fox Theatre, Boulder)	ProjeKct Four
113.	"Contrary ConstruKction" (24 October 1998 Fox Theatre, Boulder)	ProjeKct Four
114.	"VROOOM" (24 October 1998 Fox Theatre, Boulder)	ProjeKct Four
115.	"Vancouver Set One" (27 October 1998 Richard's On Richards, Vancouver)	ProjeKct Four
116.	"On Acceptance Introduction" (27 October 1998 Richard's On Richards, Vancouver)	ProjeKct Four
117.	"Seizure" (27 October 1998 Richard's On Richards, Vancouver)	ProjeKct Four
118.	"The Deception Of The Thrush" (27 October 1998 Richard's On Richards, Vancouver)	ProjeKct Four
119.	"Hindu Fizz" (27 October 1998 Richard's On Richards, Vancouver)	ProjeKct Four
120.	"VROOOM" (27 October 1998 Richard's On Richards, Vancouver)	ProjeKct Four
121.	"Seizure" (28 October 1998 The Fenix, Seattle)	ProjeKct Four
122.	"Light ConstruKction" (28 October 1998 The Fenix, Seattle)	ProjeKct Four
123.	"Ghost Pt I" (28 October 1998 The Fenix, Seattle)	ProjeKct Four
124.	"Heavy ConstruKction" (28 October 1998 The Fenix, Seattle)	ProjeKct Four
125.	"The Deception Of The Thrush" (28 October 1998 The Fenix, Seattle)	ProjeKct Four
126.	"X chayn jiZ" (28 October 1998 The Fenix, Seattle)	ProjeKct Four
127.	"Ghost Pt II" (28 October 1998 The Fenix, Seattle)	ProjeKct Four
128.	"ProjeKction" (28 October 1998 The Fenix, Seattle)	ProjeKct Four
129.	"VROOOM" (28 October 1998 The Fenix, Seattle)	ProjeKct Four
130.	"Drum And Bass" (30 October 1998 Crystal Ballroom, Portland)	ProjeKct Four
131.	"Heavy ConstruKction" (30 October 1998 Crystal Ballroom, Portland)	ProjeKct Four
132.	"Ghost" (30 October 1998 Crystal Ballroom, Portland)	ProjeKct Four
133.	"Super Slow X chayn jiZ" (30 October 1998 Crystal Ballroom, Portland)	ProjeKct Four
134.	"Light ConstruKction" (30 October 1998 Crystal Ballroom, Portland)	ProjeKct Four
135.	"Improv Two Sticks" (30 October 1998 Crystal Ballroom, Portland)	ProjeKct Four
136.	"Seizure" (30 October 1998 Crystal Ballroom, Portland)	ProjeKct Four
137.	"The Deception Of The Thrush" (30 October 1998 Crystal Ballroom, Portland)	ProjeKct Four
138.	"ProjeKction" (30 October 1998 Crystal Ballroom, Portland)	ProjeKct Four
139.	"VROOOM" (30 October 1998 Crystal Ballroom, Portland)	ProjeKct Four
140.	"Ghost" (1 November 1998 7th Note, San Francisco)	ProjeKct Four
141.	"Heavy ConstruKction" (1 November 1998 7th Note, San Francisco)	ProjeKct Four
142.	"Light ConstruKction" (1 November 1998 7th Note, San Francisco)	ProjeKct Four
143.	"The Deception Of The Thrush" (1 November 1998 7th Note, San Francisco)	ProjeKct Four
144.	"Seizure" (1 November 1998 7th Note, San Francisco)	ProjeKct Four
145.	"Ghost Pt III" (1 November 1998 7th Note, San Francisco)	ProjeKct Four
146.	"ProjeKction" (1 November 1998 7th Note, San Francisco)	ProjeKct Four
147.	"VROOOM" (1 November 1998 7th Note, San Francisco)	ProjeKct Four
148.	"Heavy ConstruKction" (2 November 1998 7th Note, San Francisco)	ProjeKct Four
149.	"Improv I" (2 November 1998 7th Note, San Francisco)	ProjeKct Four
150.	"ProjeKction" (2 November 1998 7th Note, San Francisco)	ProjeKct Four
151.	"The Deception Of The Thrush" (2 November 1998 7th Note, San Francisco)	ProjeKct Four
152.	"Hindu Fizz" (2 November 1998 7th Note, San Francisco)	ProjeKct Four
153.	"Improv II" (2 November 1998 7th Note, San Francisco)	ProjeKct Four
154.	"Seizure" (2 November 1998 7th Note, San Francisco)	ProjeKct Four
155.	"VROOOM" (2 November 1998 7th Note, San Francisco)	ProjeKct Four
156.	"Threshold Knock Knock Who's There Boston" (5 October 2006 Berklee Performance Centre, Boston)	ProjeKct Six
157.	"Time Groove Boston" (5 October 2006 Berklee Performance Centre, Boston)	ProjeKct Six
158.	"Time Groove Boston II" (5 October 2006 Berklee Performance Centre, Boston)	ProjeKct Six
159.	"Queer Jazz Boston" (5 October 2006 Berklee Performance Centre, Boston)	ProjeKct Six
160.	"Threshold P6 Boston" (5 October 2006 Berklee Performance Centre, Boston)	ProjeKct Six
161.	"Berklee Strut Boston" (5 October 2006 Berklee Performance Centre, Boston)	ProjeKct Six
162.	"End Time Boston" (5 October 2006 Berklee Performance Centre, Boston)	ProjeKct Six
163.	"Threshold Knock Knock Whos There NYC" (6 October 2006 Nokia Theatre, New York)	ProjeKct Six
164.	"Time Groove NYC" (6 October 2006 Nokia Theatre, New York)	ProjeKct Six
165.	"Mission Possible NYC" (6 October 2006 Nokia Theatre, New York)	ProjeKct Six
166.	"Space Threshold NYC" (6 October 2006 Nokia Theatre, New York)	ProjeKct Six
167.	"Queer Jazz NYC" (6 October 2006 Nokia Theatre, New York)	ProjeKct Six
168.	"Persian E NYC" (6 October 2006 Nokia Theatre, New York)	ProjeKct Six
169.	"End Time NYC" (6 October 2006 Nokia Theatre, New York)	ProjeKct Six
170.	"Threshold Knock Knock Whos There Keswick" (7 October 2006 Keswick Theatre, Glenside)	ProjeKct Six
171.	"Persian E Keswick" (7 October 2006 Keswick Theatre, Glenside)	ProjeKct Six
172.	"Time Groove Keswick" (7 October 2006 Keswick Theatre, Glenside)	ProjeKct Six
173.	"Queer Jazz Keswick" (7 October 2006 Keswick Theatre, Glenside)	ProjeKct Six
174.	"Mission Possible Keswick" (7 October 2006 Keswick Theatre, Glenside)	ProjeKct Six
175.	"End Time Keswick" (7 October 2006 Keswick Theatre, Glenside)	ProjeKct Six
176.	"Threshold Knock Knock Whos There Falls Church" (8 October 2006 State Theatre, Falls Church)	ProjeKct Six
177.	"Persian E Falls Church" (8 October 2006 State Theatre, Falls Church)	ProjeKct Six
178.	"Time Groove Falls Church" (8 October 2006 State Theatre, Falls Church)	ProjeKct Six
179.	"Queer Jazz Falls Church" (8 October 2006 State Theatre, Falls Church)	ProjeKct Six
180.	"Threshold P6 Falls Church" (8 October 2006 State Theatre, Falls Church)	ProjeKct Six
181.	"Mission Possible Falls Church" (8 October 2006 State Theatre, Falls Church)	ProjeKct Six
182.	"End Time Falls Church" (8 October 2006 State Theatre, Falls Church)	ProjeKct Six
183.	"Space Groove II" (Additional Material - The ProjeKcts On CD - ProjeKct Two - Space Groove (1998))	ProjeKct Two
184.	"Space Groove III" (Additional Material - The ProjeKcts On CD - ProjeKct Two - Space Groove (1998))	ProjeKct Two
185.	"Space Groove I" (Additional Material - The ProjeKcts On CD - ProjeKct Two - Space Groove (1998))	ProjeKct Two
186.	"Happy Hour On Planet Zarg" (Additional Material - The ProjeKcts On CD - ProjeKct Two - Space Groove (1998))	ProjeKct Two
187.	"Is There Life On Zarg?" (Additional Material - The ProjeKcts On CD - ProjeKct Two - Space Groove (1998))	ProjeKct Two
188.	"Low Life In Sector Q-3" (Additional Material - The ProjeKcts On CD - ProjeKct Two - Space Groove (1998))	ProjeKct Two
189.	"Sector Shift" (Additional Material - The ProjeKcts On CD - ProjeKct Two - Space Groove (1998))	ProjeKct Two
190.	"Laura In Space" (Additional Material - The ProjeKcts On CD - ProjeKct Two - Space Groove (1998))	ProjeKct Two
191.	"Sector Drift" (Additional Material - The ProjeKcts On CD - ProjeKct Two - Space Groove (1998))	ProjeKct Two
192.	"Sector Patrol" (Additional Material - The ProjeKcts On CD - ProjeKct Two - Space Groove (1998))	ProjeKct Two
193.	"In Space There Is No North, In Space There Is No South, In Space There Is No East, In Space There Is No West" (Additional Material - The ProjeKcts On CD - ProjeKct Two - Space Groove (1998))	ProjeKct Two
194.	"Vector Patrol" (Additional Material - The ProjeKcts On CD - ProjeKct Two - Space Groove (1998))	ProjeKct Two
195.	"Deserts Of Arcadia (North)" (Additional Material - The ProjeKcts On CD - ProjeKct Two - Space Groove (1998))	ProjeKct Two
196.	"Deserts Of Arcadia (South)" (Additional Material - The ProjeKcts On CD - ProjeKct Two - Space Groove (1998))	ProjeKct Two
197.	"Snake Drummers Of Sector Q-3" (Additional Material - The ProjeKcts On CD - ProjeKct Two - Space Groove (1998))	ProjeKct Two
198.	"Escape From Sagittarius A" (Additional Material - The ProjeKcts On CD - ProjeKct Two - Space Groove (1998))	ProjeKct Two
199.	"Return To Station" (Additional Material - The ProjeKcts On CD - ProjeKct Two - Space Groove (1998))	ProjeKct Two
200.	"4 i 1" (The ProjeKcts Box (1999) - I. ProjeKct One - Live At The Jazz Café)	ProjeKct One
201.	"4 ii 1" (The ProjeKcts Box (1999) - I. ProjeKct One - Live At The Jazz Café)	ProjeKct One
202.	"1 ii 2" (The ProjeKcts Box (1999) - I. ProjeKct One - Live At The Jazz Café)	ProjeKct One
203.	"4 ii 4" (The ProjeKcts Box (1999) - I. ProjeKct One - Live At The Jazz Café)	ProjeKct One
204.	"2 ii 3" (The ProjeKcts Box (1999) - I. ProjeKct One - Live At The Jazz Café)	ProjeKct One
205.	"3 i 2" (The ProjeKcts Box (1999) - I. ProjeKct One - Live At The Jazz Café)	ProjeKct One
206.	"3 ii 2" (The ProjeKcts Box (1999) - I. ProjeKct One - Live At The Jazz Café)	ProjeKct One
207.	"2 ii 4" (The ProjeKcts Box (1999) - I. ProjeKct One - Live At The Jazz Café)	ProjeKct One
208.	"4 i 3" (The ProjeKcts Box (1999) - I. ProjeKct Two - Live At The Jazz Café)	ProjeKct One
209.	"Sus-tayn-Z" (The ProjeKcts Box (1999) - II. ProjeKct Two - Live Groove)	ProjeKct Two
210.	"Heavy ConstruKction" (The ProjeKcts Box (1999) - II. ProjeKct Two - Live Groove)	ProjeKct Two
211.	"The Deception Of The Thrush" (The ProjeKcts Box (1999) - II. ProjeKct Two - Live Groove)	ProjeKct Two
212.	"X-chayn-jiZ" (The ProjeKcts Box (1999) - II. ProjeKct Two - Live Groove)	ProjeKct Two
213.	"Light ConstruKction" (The ProjeKcts Box (1999) - II. ProjeKct Two - Live Groove)	ProjeKct Two
214.	"Vector Shift To Planet Detroit" (The ProjeKcts Box (1999) - II. ProjeKct Two - Live Groove)	ProjeKct Two
215.	"Contrary ConstruKction" (The ProjeKcts Box (1999) - II. ProjeKct Two - Live Groove)	ProjeKct Two
216.	"Live Groove" (The ProjeKcts Box (1999) - II. ProjeKct Two - Live Groove)	ProjeKct Two
217.	"Vector Shift To Planet Belewbeloid" (The ProjeKcts Box (1999) - II. ProjeKct Two - Live Groove)	ProjeKct Two
218.	"21st Century Schizoid Man" (The ProjeKcts Box (1999) - II. ProjeKct Two - Live Groove)	ProjeKct Two
219.	"Where's The Camera?" (The ProjeKcts Box (1999) - II. ProjeKct Two - Live Groove)	ProjeKct Two
220.	"Masque 1" (The ProjeKcts Box (1999) - III. ProjeKct Three - Masque)	ProjeKct Three
221.	"Masque 2" (The ProjeKcts Box (1999) - III. ProjeKct Three - Masque)	ProjeKct Three
222.	"Masque 3" (The ProjeKcts Box (1999) - III. ProjeKct Three - Masque)	ProjeKct Three
223.	"Masque 4" (The ProjeKcts Box (1999) - III. ProjeKct Three - Masque)	ProjeKct Three
224.	"Masque 5" (The ProjeKcts Box (1999) - III. ProjeKct Three - Masque)	ProjeKct Three
225.	"Masque 6" (The ProjeKcts Box (1999) - III. ProjeKct Three - Masque)	ProjeKct Three
226.	"Masque 7" (The ProjeKcts Box (1999) - III. ProjeKct Three - Masque)	ProjeKct Three
227.	"Masque 8" (The ProjeKcts Box (1999) - III. ProjeKct Three - Masque)	ProjeKct Three
228.	"Masque 9" (The ProjeKcts Box (1999) - III. ProjeKct Three - Masque)	ProjeKct Three
229.	"Masque 10" (The ProjeKcts Box (1999) - III. ProjeKct Three - Masque)	ProjeKct Three
230.	"Masque 11" (The ProjeKcts Box (1999) - III. ProjeKct Three - Masque)	ProjeKct Three
231.	"Masque 12" (The ProjeKcts Box (1999) - III. ProjeKct Three - Masque)	ProjeKct Three
232.	"Masque 13" (The ProjeKcts Box (1999) - III. ProjeKct Three - Masque)	ProjeKct Three
233.	"Masque 14" (The ProjeKcts Box (1999) - III. ProjeKct Three - Masque)	ProjeKct Three
234.	"Ghost (Part 1)" (The ProjeKcts Box (1999) - IV. ProjeKct Four - West Coast Live)	ProjeKct Four
235.	"Ghost (Part 1)" (The ProjeKcts Box (1999) - IV. ProjeKct Four - West Coast Live)	ProjeKct Four
236.	"Ghost (Part 1)" (The ProjeKcts Box (1999) - IV. ProjeKct Four - West Coast Live)	ProjeKct Four
237.	"Ghost (Part 1)" (The ProjeKcts Box (1999) - IV. ProjeKct Four - West Coast Live)	ProjeKct Four
238.	"The Deception Of The Thrush" (The ProjeKcts Box (1999) - IV. ProjeKct Four - West Coast Live)	ProjeKct Four
239.	"Hindu Fizz" (The ProjeKcts Box (1999) - IV. ProjeKct Four - West Coast Live)	ProjeKct Four
240.	"ProjeKction" (The ProjeKcts Box (1999) - IV. ProjeKct Four - West Coast Live)	ProjeKct Four
241.	"Ghost (Part 2)" (The ProjeKcts Box (1999) - IV. ProjeKct Four - West Coast Live)	ProjeKct Four
242.	"Ghost (Part 2)" (The ProjeKcts Box (1999) - IV. ProjeKct Four - West Coast Live)	ProjeKct Four
243.	"Ghost (Part 2)" (The ProjeKcts Box (1999) - IV. ProjeKct Four - West Coast Live)	ProjeKct Four
244.	"Ghost (Part 2)" (The ProjeKcts Box (1999) - IV. ProjeKct Four - West Coast Live)	ProjeKct Four
245.	"Ghost (Part 2)" (The ProjeKcts Box (1999) - IV. ProjeKct Four - West Coast Live)	ProjeKct Four
246.	"Light ConstruKction" (The ProjeKcts Box (1999) - IV. ProjeKct Four - West Coast Live)	ProjeKct Four
247.	"Suite One" (ProjeKct One - Jazz Café Suite (CLUB 22) (2003))	ProjeKct One
248.	"Suite Two" (ProjeKct One - Jazz Café Suite (CLUB 22) (2003))	ProjeKct One
249.	"Suite Three" (ProjeKct One - Jazz Café Suite (CLUB 22) (2003))	ProjeKct One
250.	"The Business Of Pleasure" (ProjeKct X - Heaven And Earth (2000))	ProjeKct X
251.	"Hat In The Middle" (ProjeKct X - Heaven And Earth (2000))	ProjeKct X
252.	"Side Window" (ProjeKct X - Heaven And Earth (2000))	ProjeKct X
253.	"Maximizer" (ProjeKct X - Heaven And Earth (2000))	ProjeKct X
254.	"Strange Ears (Aging Rapidly)" (ProjeKct X - Heaven And Earth (2000))	ProjeKct X
255.	"Overhead Floor Mats Under Toe" (ProjeKct X - Heaven And Earth (2000))	ProjeKct X
256.	"Six O'Clock" (ProjeKct X - Heaven And Earth (2000))	ProjeKct X
257.	"Superbottomfeeder" (ProjeKct X - Heaven And Earth (2000))	ProjeKct X
258.	"One E And" (ProjeKct X - Heaven And Earth (2000))	ProjeKct X
259.	"Two Awkward Moments" (ProjeKct X - Heaven And Earth (2000))	ProjeKct X
260.	"Demolition" (ProjeKct X - Heaven And Earth (2000))	ProjeKct X
261.	"Conversation" (ProjeKct X - Heaven And Earth (2000))	ProjeKct X
262.	"Çin Alayi" (ProjeKct X - Heaven And Earth (2000))	ProjeKct X
263.	"Heaven And Earth" (ProjeKct X - Heaven And Earth (2000))	ProjeKct X
264.	"Belew Jay Way" (ProjeKct X - Heaven And Earth (2000))	ProjeKct X
265.	"Hello Ghost" (BPM&M - XtraKcts & ArtifaKcts (2001))	BPM&M
266.	"The Irresistible Blowtorch" (BPM&M - XtraKcts & ArtifaKcts (2001))	BPM&M
267.	"What Were You Expecting?" (BPM&M - XtraKcts & ArtifaKcts (2001))	BPM&M
268.	"What? Coda" (BPM&M - XtraKcts & ArtifaKcts (2001))	BPM&M
269.	"Brutal Ecstasy (With This Fuzzbox)" (BPM&M - XtraKcts & ArtifaKcts (2001))	BPM&M
270.	"Cracker Barrel" (BPM&M - XtraKcts & ArtifaKcts (2001))	BPM&M
271.	"Multi Vibrator" (BPM&M - XtraKcts & ArtifaKcts (2001))	BPM&M
272.	"Parallax Distortion" (BPM&M - XtraKcts & ArtifaKcts (2001))	BPM&M
273.	"Slow Blow" (BPM&M - XtraKcts & ArtifaKcts (2001))	BPM&M
274.	"elloH gHost" (BPM&M - XtraKcts & ArtifaKcts (2001))	BPM&M
275.	"Bonkers" (BPM&M - XtraKcts & ArtifaKcts (2001))	BPM&M
276.	"Monkey Mind" (BPM&M - XtraKcts & ArtifaKcts (2001))	BPM&M
277.	"Your Head Is In My Hands" (BPM&M - XtraKcts & ArtifaKcts (2001))	BPM&M
278.	"Cranial Interium" (BPM&M - XtraKcts & ArtifaKcts (2001))	BPM&M
279.	"Brutal Coda" (BPM&M - XtraKcts & ArtifaKcts (2001))	BPM&M
280.	"Danpen" (BPM&M - XtraKcts & ArtifaKcts (2001))	BPM&M
281.	"Strangers On A Train?" (Rieflin, Fripp, Gunn - The Repercussions Of Angelic Behaviour (1999))	Bill Rieflin*, Robert Fripp, Trey Gunn
282.	"Blast, Pt. 1" (Rieflin, Fripp, Gunn - The Repercussions Of Angelic Behaviour (1999))	Bill Rieflin*, Robert Fripp, Trey Gunn
283.	"Lost And Found Highway" (Rieflin, Fripp, Gunn - The Repercussions Of Angelic Behaviour (1999))	Bill Rieflin*, Robert Fripp, Trey Gunn
284.	"Hootenanny At The Pink Pussycat Café" (Rieflin, Fripp, Gunn - The Repercussions Of Angelic Behaviour (1999))	Bill Rieflin*, Robert Fripp, Trey Gunn
285.	"Heard, Not Seen" (Rieflin, Fripp, Gunn - The Repercussions Of Angelic Behaviour (1999))	Bill Rieflin*, Robert Fripp, Trey Gunn
286.	"Blast, Pt. 2" (Rieflin, Fripp, Gunn - The Repercussions Of Angelic Behaviour (1999))	Bill Rieflin*, Robert Fripp, Trey Gunn
287.	"Retarded (With Steam)" (Rieflin, Fripp, Gunn - The Repercussions Of Angelic Behaviour (1999))	Bill Rieflin*, Robert Fripp, Trey Gunn
288.	"Re-Entry" (Rieflin, Fripp, Gunn - The Repercussions Of Angelic Behaviour (1999))	Bill Rieflin*, Robert Fripp, Trey Gunn
289.	"Brown Soufflé" (Rieflin, Fripp, Gunn - The Repercussions Of Angelic Behaviour (1999))	Bill Rieflin*, Robert Fripp, Trey Gunn
290.	"Last Stop" (Rieflin, Fripp, Gunn - The Repercussions Of Angelic Behaviour (1999))	Bill Rieflin*, Robert Fripp, Trey Gunn

Heaven & Earth, Disc 22: Blu-ray disc 2 – The ProjeKcts Vol. II - DTS-HD Master Audio (16/48) - ProjeKct Two
No.	Title	Group	Length
1.	"Space Groove IV" (18 & 19 February 1998 Rehearsals, Studio Belew)	ProjeKct Two
2.	"Happy Hour On Planet Zarg" (18 & 19 February 1998 Rehearsals, Studio Belew)	ProjeKct Two
3.	"Space Groove V" (18 & 19 February 1998 Rehearsals, Studio Belew)	ProjeKct Two
4.	"Bees On Mars" (18 & 19 February 1998 Rehearsals, Studio Belew)	ProjeKct Two
5.	"The Thrush Deceiver" (18 & 19 February 1998 Rehearsals, Studio Belew)	ProjeKct Two
6.	"X chayn jiZ" (18 & 19 February 1998 Rehearsals, Studio Belew)	ProjeKct Two
7.	"Vector Shift" (18 & 19 February 1998 Rehearsals, Studio Belew)	ProjeKct Two
8.	"Fall Of The House Of Zarg" (18 & 19 February 1998 Rehearsals, Studio Belew)	ProjeKct Two
9.	"Nuages Pt II" (18 & 19 February 1998 Rehearsals, Studio Belew)	ProjeKct Two
10.	"Snake Charmers Of Sector Q3" (18 & 19 February 1998 Rehearsals, Studio Belew)	ProjeKct Two
11.	"Sunset On Planet Zarg" (18 & 19 February 1998 Rehearsals, Studio Belew)	ProjeKct Two
12.	"Announcement" (20 February 1998 The Cannery, Nashville)	ProjeKct Two
13.	"Live Groove" (20 February 1998 The Cannery, Nashville)	ProjeKct Two
14.	"Sector Shift" (20 February 1998 The Cannery, Nashville)	ProjeKct Two
15.	"House II" (20 February 1998 The Cannery, Nashville)	ProjeKct Two
16.	"The Deception Of The Thrush" (20 February 1998 The Cannery, Nashville)	ProjeKct Two
17.	"Sector Patrol" (20 February 1998 The Cannery, Nashville)	ProjeKct Two
18.	"Happy Hour On Planet Zarg" (20 February 1998 The Cannery, Nashville)	ProjeKct Two
19.	"Sector Drift" (20 February 1998 The Cannery, Nashville)	ProjeKct Two
20.	"House I" (20 February 1998 The Cannery, Nashville)	ProjeKct Two
21.	"Live Groove Reprise" (20 February 1998 The Cannery, Nashville)	ProjeKct Two
22.	"Introductory Soundscape" (18 March 1998 Ventura Theatre, Ventura)	ProjeKct Two
23.	"Live Groove" (18 March 1998 Ventura Theatre, Ventura)	ProjeKct Two
24.	"Happy Hour On Planet Zarg" (18 March 1998 Ventura Theatre, Ventura)	ProjeKct Two
25.	"Sector Shift" (18 March 1998 Ventura Theatre, Ventura)	ProjeKct Two
26.	"House I" (18 March 1998 Ventura Theatre, Ventura)	ProjeKct Two
27.	"Light ConstruKction" (18 March 1998 Ventura Theatre, Ventura)	ProjeKct Two
28.	"Vector Shift To Intermission" (18 March 1998 Ventura Theatre, Ventura)	ProjeKct Two
29.	"The Deception Of The Thrush" (18 March 1998 Ventura Theatre, Ventura)	ProjeKct Two
30.	"X chayn jiZ" (18 March 1998 Ventura Theatre, Ventura)	ProjeKct Two
31.	"Sector Patrol" (18 March 1998 Ventura Theatre, Ventura)	ProjeKct Two
32.	"Vector Patrol In Sector Q3" (18 March 1998 Ventura Theatre, Ventura)	ProjeKct Two
33.	"Contrary ConstruKction" (18 March 1998 Ventura Theatre, Ventura)	ProjeKct Two
34.	"Sector Shift" (18 March 1998 Ventura Theatre, Ventura)	ProjeKct Two
35.	"House II" (18 March 1998 Ventura Theatre, Ventura)	ProjeKct Two
36.	"VROOOM" (18 March 1998 Ventura Theatre, Ventura)	ProjeKct Two
37.	"Search Patrol In Sector Q3" (18 March 1998 Ventura Theatre, Ventura)	ProjeKct Two
38.	"Introductory Soundscape" (20 March 1998 Pallokaville, Santa Cruz)	ProjeKct Two
39.	"Sector Dhift" (20 March 1998 Pallokaville, Santa Cruz)	ProjeKct Two
40.	"Live Groove" (20 March 1998 Pallokaville, Santa Cruz)	ProjeKct Two
41.	"Search For Planet Zarg" (20 March 1998 Pallokaville, Santa Cruz)	ProjeKct Two
42.	"Sector Shift" (20 March 1998 Pallokaville, Santa Cruz)	ProjeKct Two
43.	"House I" (20 March 1998 Pallokaville, Santa Cruz)	ProjeKct Two
44.	"Vector Shift" (20 March 1998 Pallokaville, Santa Cruz)	ProjeKct Two
45.	"Light ConstruKction" (20 March 1998 Pallokaville, Santa Cruz)	ProjeKct Two
46.	"Low Life On Sagittarius A" (20 March 1998 Pallokaville, Santa Cruz)	ProjeKct Two
47.	"The Deception Of The Thrush" (20 March 1998 Pallokaville, Santa Cruz)	ProjeKct Two
48.	"Vector Shift To Planet Belewbeloid" (20 March 1998 Pallokaville, Santa Cruz)	ProjeKct Two
49.	"X chayn jiZ" (20 March 1998 Pallokaville, Santa Cruz)	ProjeKct Two
50.	"Vector Drift" (20 March 1998 Pallokaville, Santa Cruz)	ProjeKct Two
51.	"Contrary ConstruKction" (20 March 1998 Pallokaville, Santa Cruz)	ProjeKct Two
52.	"VROOOM" (20 March 1998 Pallokaville, Santa Cruz)	ProjeKct Two
53.	"Introductory Soundscape" (21 March 1998 Great American Music Hall, San Francisco)	ProjeKct Two
54.	"Live Groove" (21 March 1998 Great American Music Hall, San Francisco)	ProjeKct Two
55.	"House I" (21 March 1998 Great American Music Hall, San Francisco)	ProjeKct Two
56.	"Sector Shift I" (21 March 1998 Great American Music Hall, San Francisco)	ProjeKct Two
57.	"X chayn jiZ" (21 March 1998 Great American Music Hall, San Francisco)	ProjeKct Two
58.	"Happy Hour On Planet Zarg" (21 March 1998 Great American Music Hall, San Francisco)	ProjeKct Two
59.	"Deserts Of Arcadia East" (21 March 1998 Great American Music Hall, San Francisco)	ProjeKct Two
60.	"The Deception Of The Thrush" (21 March 1998 Great American Music Hall, San Francisco)	ProjeKct Two
61.	"Sector Shift II" (21 March 1998 Great American Music Hall, San Francisco)	ProjeKct Two
62.	"House II" (21 March 1998 Great American Music Hall, San Francisco)	ProjeKct Two
63.	"Sector Shift III" (21 March 1998 Great American Music Hall, San Francisco)	ProjeKct Two
64.	"Deserts Of Planet Zarg" (21 March 1998 Great American Music Hall, San Francisco)	ProjeKct Two
65.	"ProjeKction" (21 March 1998 Great American Music Hall, San Francisco)	ProjeKct Two
66.	"RF Announcement" (21 March 1998 Great American Music Hall, San Francisco)	ProjeKct Two
67.	"VROOOM" (21 March 1998 Great American Music Hall, San Francisco)	ProjeKct Two
68.	"Introductory Soundscape" (22 March 1998 Great American Music Hall, San Francisco)	ProjeKct Two
69.	"Escape From Sagittarius B" (22 March 1998 Great American Music Hall, San Francisco)	ProjeKct Two
70.	"Sector Shift I" (22 March 1998 Great American Music Hall, San Francisco)	ProjeKct Two
71.	"Live Groove" (22 March 1998 Great American Music Hall, San Francisco)	ProjeKct Two
72.	"Sector Shirft II" (22 March 1998 Great American Music Hall, San Francisco)	ProjeKct Two
73.	"Return To Sagittarius B" (22 March 1998 Great American Music Hall, San Francisco)	ProjeKct Two
74.	"The Deception Of The Thrush" (22 March 1998 Great American Music Hall, San Francisco)	ProjeKct Two
75.	"X chayn jiZ" (22 March 1998 Great American Music Hall, San Francisco)	ProjeKct Two
76.	"Sector Shift III" (22 March 1998 Great American Music Hall, San Francisco)	ProjeKct Two
77.	"House I" (22 March 1998 Great American Music Hall, San Francisco)	ProjeKct Two
78.	"ProjeKction" (22 March 1998 Great American Music Hall, San Francisco)	ProjeKct Two
79.	"RF Announcement" (22 March 1998 Great American Music Hall, San Francisco)	ProjeKct Two
80.	"VROOOM" (22 March 1998 Great American Music Hall, San Francisco)	ProjeKct Two
81.	"Heavy ConstruKction" (24 March 1998 House Of Blues, Los Angeles)	ProjeKct Two
82.	"Vector Shift" (24 March 1998 House Of Blues, Los Angeles)	ProjeKct Two
83.	"Light ConstruKction" (24 March 1998 House Of Blues, Los Angeles)	ProjeKct Two
84.	"House I" (24 March 1998 House Of Blues, Los Angeles)	ProjeKct Two
85.	"The Deception Of The Thrush" (24 March 1998 House Of Blues, Los Angeles)	ProjeKct Two
86.	"Vector Shift To Planet Belewbeloid" (24 March 1998 House Of Blues, Los Angeles)	ProjeKct Two
87.	"X chayn jiZ" (24 March 1998 House Of Blues, Los Angeles)	ProjeKct Two
88.	"Sector Shift" (24 March 1998 House Of Blues, Los Angeles)	ProjeKct Two
89.	"Bass Groove" (24 March 1998 House Of Blues, Los Angeles)	ProjeKct Two
90.	"Contrary ConstruKction" (24 March 1998 House Of Blues, Los Angeles)	ProjeKct Two
91.	"VROOOM" (24 March 1998 House Of Blues, Los Angeles)	ProjeKct Two
92.	"Live Groove" (7 April 1998 Diamond Hall, Nagoya)	ProjeKct Two
93.	"Vector Shift" (7 April 1998 Diamond Hall, Nagoya)	ProjeKct Two
94.	"House I" (7 April 1998 Diamond Hall, Nagoya)	ProjeKct Two
95.	"Vector Drift" (7 April 1998 Diamond Hall, Nagoya)	ProjeKct Two
96.	"Light X chayn jiZ" (7 April 1998 Diamond Hall, Nagoya)	ProjeKct Two
97.	"The Deception Of The Thrush" (7 April 1998 Diamond Hall, Nagoya)	ProjeKct Two
98.	"Happy Hour On Planet Zarg" (7 April 1998 Diamond Hall, Nagoya)	ProjeKct Two
99.	"Sector Shift" (7 April 1998 Diamond Hall, Nagoya)	ProjeKct Two
100.	"Contrary ConstruKction" (7 April 1998 Diamond Hall, Nagoya)	ProjeKct Two
101.	"Heavy ConstruKction" (8 April 1998 Heart Beat, Osaka)	ProjeKct Two
102.	"Sector Drift" (8 April 1998 Heart Beat, Osaka)	ProjeKct Two
103.	"Live Groove" (8 April 1998 Heart Beat, Osaka)	ProjeKct Two
104.	"Vector Shift" (8 April 1998 Heart Beat, Osaka)	ProjeKct Two
105.	"Search For Sagittarius A" (8 April 1998 Heart Beat, Osaka)	ProjeKct Two
106.	"Sector Shift" (8 April 1998 Heart Beat, Osaka)	ProjeKct Two
107.	"House" (8 April 1998 Heart Beat, Osaka)	ProjeKct Two
108.	"The Deception Of The Thrush" (8 April 1998 Heart Beat, Osaka)	ProjeKct Two
109.	"SContrary ConstruKction" (8 April 1998 Heart Beat, Osaka)	ProjeKct Two
110.	"Heavy ConstruKction" (9 April 1998 Blitz, Tokyo)	ProjeKct Two
111.	"Vector Shift" (9 April 1998 Blitz, Tokyo)	ProjeKct Two
112.	"Live Groove" (9 April 1998 Blitz, Tokyo)	ProjeKct Two
113.	"Sector Shift" (9 April 1998 Blitz, Tokyo)	ProjeKct Two
114.	"Searching For Planet Zarg" (9 April 1998 Blitz, Tokyo)	ProjeKct Two
115.	"X chayn jiZ" (9 April 1998 Blitz, Tokyo)	ProjeKct Two
116.	"Sector Drift" (9 April 1998 Blitz, Tokyo)	ProjeKct Two
117.	"Searching For Low Life In Sector Q3" (9 April 1998 Blitz, Tokyo)	ProjeKct Two
118.	"The Deception Of The Thrush" (9 April 1998 Blitz, Tokyo)	ProjeKct Two
119.	"Contrary ConstruKction" (9 April 1998 Blitz, Tokyo)	ProjeKct Two
120.	"Heavy ConstruKction" (10 April 1998 Blitz, Tokyo)	ProjeKct Two
121.	"Live Groove" (10 April 1998 Blitz, Tokyo)	ProjeKct Two
122.	"Sector Patrol" (10 April 1998 Blitz, Tokyo)	ProjeKct Two
123.	"X chayn jiZ" (10 April 1998 Blitz, Tokyo)	ProjeKct Two
124.	"Vector Shift" (10 April 1998 Blitz, Tokyo)	ProjeKct Two
125.	"VROOOM" (10 April 1998 Blitz, Tokyo)	ProjeKct Two
126.	"Vector Shift" (10 April 1998 Blitz, Tokyo)	ProjeKct Two
127.	"Contrary ConstruKction" (10 April 1998 Blitz, Tokyo)	ProjeKct Two
128.	"The Deception Of The Thrush" (10 April 1998 Blitz, Tokyo)	ProjeKct Two
129.	"Heavy ConstruKction" (16 April 1998 Jazz Café, London)	ProjeKct Two
130.	"Vector Shift To Planet Jazz Café I" (16 April 1998 Jazz Café, London)	ProjeKct Two
131.	"Live Groove" (16 April 1998 Jazz Café, London)	ProjeKct Two
132.	"Vector Shift To Planet Jazz Café II" (16 April 1998 Jazz Café, London)	ProjeKct Two
133.	"X chayn jiZ" (16 April 1998 Jazz Café, London)	ProjeKct Two
134.	"The Deception Of The Thrush" (16 April 1998 Jazz Café, London)	ProjeKct Two
135.	"Contrary ConstruKction" (16 April 1998 Jazz Café, London)	ProjeKct Two
136.	"Vector Shift To Planet Jazz Café III" (16 April 1998 Jazz Café, London)	ProjeKct Two
137.	"House I" (16 April 1998 Jazz Café, London)	ProjeKct Two
138.	"VROOOM" (16 April 1998 Jazz Café, London)	ProjeKct Two
139.	"Introductory Soundscape" (18 April 1998 Ronnie Scotts, Birmingham)	ProjeKct Two
140.	"House I" (18 April 1998 Ronnie Scotts, Birmingham)	ProjeKct Two
141.	"Vector Shift" (18 April 1998 Ronnie Scotts, Birmingham)	ProjeKct Two
142.	"Live Groove" (18 April 1998 Ronnie Scotts, Birmingham)	ProjeKct Two
143.	"Sector Drift" (18 April 1998 Ronnie Scotts, Birmingham)	ProjeKct Two
144.	"X chayn jiZ" (18 April 1998 Ronnie Scotts, Birmingham)	ProjeKct Two
145.	"The Deception Of The Thrush" (18 April 1998 Ronnie Scotts, Birmingham)	ProjeKct Two
146.	"Heavy ConstruKction" (18 April 1998 Ronnie Scotts, Birmingham)	ProjeKct Two
147.	"Sector Shift" (18 April 1998 Ronnie Scotts, Birmingham)	ProjeKct Two
148.	"Sector Drift Search" (18 April 1998 Ronnie Scotts, Birmingham)	ProjeKct Two
149.	"Disturbance In Sector Q 3" (18 April 1998 Ronnie Scotts, Birmingham)	ProjeKct Two
150.	"Sector Drift" (18 April 1998 Ronnie Scotts, Birmingham)	ProjeKct Two
151.	"Contrary ConstruKction" (18 April 1998 Ronnie Scotts, Birmingham)	ProjeKct Two
152.	"VROOOM" (18 April 1998 Ronnie Scotts, Birmingham)	ProjeKct Two
153.	"Vector Shift" (19 April 1998 Ronnie Scotts, Birmingham)	ProjeKct Two
154.	"Sector Q 3 Where Are You" (19 April 1998 Ronnie Scotts, Birmingham)	ProjeKct Two
155.	"Sus tayn Z" (19 April 1998 Ronnie Scotts, Birmingham)	ProjeKct Two
156.	"Live Groove" (19 April 1998 Ronnie Scotts, Birmingham)	ProjeKct Two
157.	"Sector Drift" (19 April 1998 Ronnie Scotts, Birmingham)	ProjeKct Two
158.	"The Search Continues For Life On Zarg" (19 April 1998 Ronnie Scotts, Birmingham)	ProjeKct Two
159.	"X chayn jiZ" (19 April 1998 Ronnie Scotts, Birmingham)	ProjeKct Two
160.	"Vector Shift" (19 April 1998 Ronnie Scotts, Birmingham)	ProjeKct Two
161.	"House" (19 April 1998 Ronnie Scotts, Birmingham)	ProjeKct Two
162.	"Heavy ConstruKction" (19 April 1998 Ronnie Scotts, Birmingham)	ProjeKct Two
163.	"Vector Shift" (19 April 1998 Ronnie Scotts, Birmingham)	ProjeKct Two
164.	"VROOOM" (19 April 1998 Ronnie Scotts, Birmingham)	ProjeKct Two
165.	"Contrary ConstruKction" (19 April 1998 Ronnie Scotts, Birmingham)	ProjeKct Two
166.	"The Deception Of The Thrush" (19 April 1998 Ronnie Scotts, Birmingham)	ProjeKct Two
167.	"Vector Shift To Heavy ConstruKction" (1 May 1998 9.30 Club, Washington D.C)	ProjeKct Two
168.	"Heavy ConstruKction" (1 May 1998 9.30 Club, Washington D.C)	ProjeKct Two
169.	"Sus tayn Z" (1 May 1998 9.30 Club, Washington D.C)	ProjeKct Two
170.	"Vector Drift" (1 May 1998 9.30 Club, Washington D.C)	ProjeKct Two
171.	"X chayn jiZ" (1 May 1998 9.30 Club, Washington D.C)	ProjeKct Two
172.	"The Deception Of The Thrush" (1 May 1998 9.30 Club, Washington D.C)	ProjeKct Two
173.	"House I" (1 May 1998 9.30 Club, Washington D.C)	ProjeKct Two
174.	"Sector Patrol" (1 May 1998 9.30 Club, Washington D.C)	ProjeKct Two
175.	"Contrary ConstruKction" (1 May 1998 9.30 Club, Washington D.C)	ProjeKct Two
176.	"VROOOM" (1 May 1998 9.30 Club, Washington D.C)	ProjeKct Two
177.	"Introductory Soundscape" (2 May 1998 Bohager's, Baltimore)	ProjeKct Two
178.	"House I" (2 May 1998 Bohager's, Baltimore)	ProjeKct Two
179.	"Heavy ConstruKction" (2 May 1998 Bohager's, Baltimore)	ProjeKct Two
180.	"Vector Drift" (2 May 1998 Bohager's, Baltimore)	ProjeKct Two
181.	"Light ConstruKction" (2 May 1998 Bohager's, Baltimore)	ProjeKct Two
182.	"Live Groove" (2 May 1998 Bohager's, Baltimore)	ProjeKct Two
183.	"X chayn jiZ" (2 May 1998 Bohager's, Baltimore)	ProjeKct Two
184.	"Sector Patrol" (2 May 1998 Bohager's, Baltimore)	ProjeKct Two
185.	"Vector Shift To Planet Belewbeloid" (2 May 1998 Bohager's, Baltimore)	ProjeKct Two
186.	"Contrary ConstruKction" (2 May 1998 Bohager's, Baltimore)	ProjeKct Two
187.	"The Deception Of The Thrush" (2 May 1998 Bohager's, Baltimore)	ProjeKct Two
188.	"VROOOM" (2 May 1998 Bohager's, Baltimore)	ProjeKct Two
189.	"Introductory Soundscape" (3 May 1998 Ballroom At The Bellvue, Philadelphia)	ProjeKct Two
190.	"Contrary ConstruKction" (3 May 1998 Ballroom At The Bellvue, Philadelphia)	ProjeKct Two
191.	"Sus tayn Z" (3 May 1998 Ballroom At The Bellvue, Philadelphia)	ProjeKct Two
192.	"Vector Shift" (3 May 1998 Ballroom At The Bellvue, Philadelphia)	ProjeKct Two
193.	"Light ConstruKction" (3 May 1998 Ballroom At The Bellvue, Philadelphia)	ProjeKct Two
194.	"X chayn jiZ" (3 May 1998 Ballroom At The Bellvue, Philadelphia)	ProjeKct Two
195.	"The Deception Of The Thrush" (3 May 1998 Ballroom At The Bellvue, Philadelphia)	ProjeKct Two
196.	"Heavy ConstruKction" (3 May 1998 Ballroom At The Bellvue, Philadelphia)	ProjeKct Two
197.	"Sector Patrol" (3 May 1998 Ballroom At The Bellvue, Philadelphia)	ProjeKct Two
198.	"House" (3 May 1998 Ballroom At The Bellvue, Philadelphia)	ProjeKct Two
199.	"Vector Shift" (4 May 1998 Toad's Place, New Haven)	ProjeKct Two
200.	"Heavy ConstruKction I" (4 May 1998 Toad's Place, New Haven)	ProjeKct Two
201.	"Vector Shift" (4 May 1998 Toad's Place, New Haven)	ProjeKct Two
202.	"Live Groove" (4 May 1998 Toad's Place, New Haven)	ProjeKct Two
203.	"Vector Drift" (4 May 1998 Toad's Place, New Haven)	ProjeKct Two
204.	"Light ConstruKction" (4 May 1998 Toad's Place, New Haven)	ProjeKct Two
205.	"X chayn jiZ" (4 May 1998 Toad's Place, New Haven)	ProjeKct Two
206.	"Heavy ConstruKction II" (4 May 1998 Toad's Place, New Haven)	ProjeKct Two
207.	"Sector Patrol" (4 May 1998 Toad's Place, New Haven)	ProjeKct Two
208.	"Contrary ConstruKction" (4 May 1998 Toad's Place, New Haven)	ProjeKct Two
209.	"The Deception Of The Thrush" (4 May 1998 Toad's Place, New Haven)	ProjeKct Two
210.	"VROOOM" (4 May 1998 Toad's Place, New Haven)	ProjeKct Two
211.	"Vector Shift To Heavy ConstruKction" (6 May 1998 Irving Plaza, New York)	ProjeKct Two
212.	"Heavy ConstruKction" (6 May 1998 Irving Plaza, New York)	ProjeKct Two
213.	"Sus tayn Z" (6 May 1998 Irving Plaza, New York)	ProjeKct Two
214.	"Light ConstruKction" (6 May 1998 Irving Plaza, New York)	ProjeKct Two
215.	"Vector Shift To Planet NYC I" (6 May 1998 Irving Plaza, New York)	ProjeKct Two
216.	"X chayn jiZ" (6 May 1998 Irving Plaza, New York)	ProjeKct Two
217.	"Introductory Soundscape" (6 May 1998 Irving Plaza, New York)	ProjeKct Two
218.	"Heavy ConstruKction" (6 May 1998 Irving Plaza, New York)	ProjeKct Two
219.	"The Deception Of The Thrush" (6 May 1998 Irving Plaza, New York)	ProjeKct Two
220.	"Vector Shift To Planet Zarg" (6 May 1998 Irving Plaza, New York)	ProjeKct Two
221.	"Vector Shift To Planet Belewbeloid" (6 May 1998 Irving Plaza, New York)	ProjeKct Two
222.	"Contrary ConstruKction" (6 May 1998 Irving Plaza, New York)	ProjeKct Two
223.	"VROOOM" (6 May 1998 Irving Plaza, New York)	ProjeKct Two
224.	"Live Groove" (6 May 1998 Irving Plaza, New York)	ProjeKct Two
225.	"Introductory Soundscape" (7 May 1998 Irving Plaza, New York)	ProjeKct Two
226.	"House I" (7 May 1998 Irving Plaza, New York)	ProjeKct Two
227.	"Heavy ConstruKtion" (7 May 1998 Irving Plaza, New York)	ProjeKct Two
228.	"Vector Shift To Planet NYC II" (7 May 1998 Irving Plaza, New York)	ProjeKct Two
229.	"X chayn jiZ" (7 May 1998 Irving Plaza, New York)	ProjeKct Two
230.	"Sus tayn Z" (7 May 1998 Irving Plaza, New York)	ProjeKct Two
231.	"The Deception Of The Thrush" (7 May 1998 Irving Plaza, New York)	ProjeKct Two
232.	"House II" (7 May 1998 Irving Plaza, New York)	ProjeKct Two
233.	"Vector Shift To Planet Belewbeloid" (7 May 1998 Irving Plaza, New York)	ProjeKct Two
234.	"Vector Shift To Happy Hour On Planet Zarg" (7 May 1998 Irving Plaza, New York)	ProjeKct Two
235.	"Vector Shift To Contrary ConstruKction" (7 May 1998 Irving Plaza, New York)	ProjeKct Two
236.	"Contrary ConstruKction" (7 May 1998 Irving Plaza, New York)	ProjeKct Two
237.	"VROOOM" (7 May 1998 Irving Plaza, New York)	ProjeKct Two
238.	"Vector Shift" (8 May 1998 Valentines, Albany)	ProjeKct Two
239.	"Fast ConstruKction" (8 May 1998 Valentines, Albany)	ProjeKct Two
240.	"Sus tayn Z" (8 May 1998 Valentines, Albany)	ProjeKct Two
241.	"Vector Shift" (8 May 1998 Valentines, Albany)	ProjeKct Two
242.	"Could There Be Life On Zarg" (8 May 1998 Valentines, Albany)	ProjeKct Two
243.	"X chayn jiZ" (8 May 1998 Valentines, Albany)	ProjeKct Two
244.	"Heavy ConstruKction" (8 May 1998 Valentines, Albany)	ProjeKct Two
245.	"The Deception Of The Thrush" (8 May 1998 Valentines, Albany)	ProjeKct Two
246.	"Sector Shift" (8 May 1998 Valentines, Albany)	ProjeKct Two
247.	"Vector Shift To Planet Belewbeloid" (8 May 1998 Valentines, Albany)	ProjeKct Two
248.	"Vector Shift" (8 May 1998 Valentines, Albany)	ProjeKct Two
249.	"Contrary ConstruKction" (8 May 1998 Valentines, Albany)	ProjeKct Two
250.	"VROOOM" (8 May 1998 Valentines, Albany)	ProjeKct Two
251.	"Introductory Soundscape" (9 May 1998 Inter Media Arts Centre, Huntington)	ProjeKct Two
252.	"House I" (9 May 1998 Inter Media Arts Centre, Huntington)	ProjeKct Two
253.	"Heavy ConstruKction" (9 May 1998 Inter Media Arts Centre, Huntington)	ProjeKct Two
254.	"Vector Shift To Planet Belewbeloid" (9 May 1998 Inter Media Arts Centre, Huntington)	ProjeKct Two
255.	"Vector Drift" (9 May 1998 Inter Media Arts Centre, Huntington)	ProjeKct Two
256.	"Could There Be Life On Zarg" (9 May 1998 Inter Media Arts Centre, Huntington)	ProjeKct Two
257.	"Sus tayn Z" (9 May 1998 Inter Media Arts Centre, Huntington)	ProjeKct Two
258.	"House II" (9 May 1998 Inter Media Arts Centre, Huntington)	ProjeKct Two
259.	"Space ConstruKction" (9 May 1998 Inter Media Arts Centre, Huntington)	ProjeKct Two
260.	"The Deception Of The Thrush" (9 May 1998 Inter Media Arts Centre, Huntington)	ProjeKct Two
261.	"X chayn jiZ" (9 May 1998 Inter Media Arts Centre, Huntington)	ProjeKct Two
262.	"Contrary ConstruKction" (9 May 1998 Inter Media Arts Centre, Huntington)	ProjeKct Two
263.	"VROOOM" (9 May 1998 Inter Media Arts Centre, Huntington)	ProjeKct Two
264.	"Sector Shift" (30 May 1998 Bogart's, Cincinnati)	ProjeKct Two
265.	"House I" (30 May 1998 Bogart's, Cincinnati)	ProjeKct Two
266.	"Live Groove" (30 May 1998 Bogart's, Cincinnati)	ProjeKct Two
267.	"Vector Shift" (30 May 1998 Bogart's, Cincinnati)	ProjeKct Two
268.	"Vector Shift To Planet Belewbeloid" (30 May 1998 Bogart's, Cincinnati)	ProjeKct Two
269.	"Light ConstruKction" (30 May 1998 Bogart's, Cincinnati)	ProjeKct Two
270.	"Heavy ConstruKction" (30 May 1998 Bogart's, Cincinnati)	ProjeKct Two
271.	"The Deception Of The Thrush" (30 May 1998 Bogart's, Cincinnati)	ProjeKct Two
272.	"X chayn jiZ" (30 May 1998 Bogart's, Cincinnati)	ProjeKct Two
273.	"Vector Patrol" (30 May 1998 Bogart's, Cincinnati)	ProjeKct Two
274.	"Contrary ConstruKction" (30 May 1998 Bogart's, Cincinnati)	ProjeKct Two
275.	"Dinosaur" (30 May 1998 Bogart's, Cincinnati)	ProjeKct Two
276.	"VROOOM" (30 May 1998 Bogart's, Cincinnati)	ProjeKct Two
277.	"Introductory Soundscape" (31 May 1998 Newport Music Hall, Columbus)	ProjeKct Two
278.	"Slow House" (31 May 1998 Newport Music Hall, Columbus)	ProjeKct Two
279.	"Sus tayn Z" (31 May 1998 Newport Music Hall, Columbus)	ProjeKct Two
280.	"Sector Drift" (31 May 1998 Newport Music Hall, Columbus)	ProjeKct Two
281.	"Vector Shift To Planet Belewbeloid" (31 May 1998 Newport Music Hall, Columbus)	ProjeKct Two
282.	"Light ConstruKction" (31 May 1998 Newport Music Hall, Columbus)	ProjeKct Two
283.	"Heavy ConstruKction" (31 May 1998 Newport Music Hall, Columbus)	ProjeKct Two
284.	"Young Lions" (31 May 1998 Newport Music Hall, Columbus)	ProjeKct Two
285.	"Men In Helicopters" (31 May 1998 Newport Music Hall, Columbus)	ProjeKct Two
286.	"Contrary ConstruKction" (31 May 1998 Newport Music Hall, Columbus)	ProjeKct Two
287.	"Vector Patrol" (31 May 1998 Newport Music Hall, Columbus)	ProjeKct Two
288.	"X chayn jiZ" (31 May 1998 Newport Music Hall, Columbus)	ProjeKct Two
289.	"The Deception Of The Thrush" (31 May 1998 Newport Music Hall, Columbus)	ProjeKct Two
290.	"Dinosaur" (31 May 1998 Newport Music Hall, Columbus)	ProjeKct Two
291.	"VROOOM" (31 May 1998 Newport Music Hall, Columbus)	ProjeKct Two
292.	"Introductory Soundscape" (1 June 1998 I.C. Light Music Tent, Pittsburgh)	ProjeKct Two
293.	"Vector Shift" (1 June 1998 I.C. Light Music Tent, Pittsburgh)	ProjeKct Two
294.	"Sus tayn Z" (1 June 1998 I.C. Light Music Tent, Pittsburgh)	ProjeKct Two
295.	"Live Groove" (1 June 1998 I.C. Light Music Tent, Pittsburgh)	ProjeKct Two
296.	"Vector Shift To Planet Belewbeloid" (1 June 1998 I.C. Light Music Tent, Pittsburgh)	ProjeKct Two
297.	"Light ConstruKction" (1 June 1998 I.C. Light Music Tent, Pittsburgh)	ProjeKct Two
298.	"Heavy ConstruKction" (1 June 1998 I.C. Light Music Tent, Pittsburgh)	ProjeKct Two
299.	"The Deception Of The Thrush" (1 June 1998 I.C. Light Music Tent, Pittsburgh)	ProjeKct Two
300.	"X chayn jiZ" (1 June 1998 I.C. Light Music Tent, Pittsburgh)	ProjeKct Two
301.	"Vector Shift" (1 June 1998 I.C. Light Music Tent, Pittsburgh)	ProjeKct Two
302.	"Contrary ConstruKction" (1 June 1998 I.C. Light Music Tent, Pittsburgh)	ProjeKct Two
303.	"Dinosaur" (1 June 1998 I.C. Light Music Tent, Pittsburgh)	ProjeKct Two
304.	"VROOOM" (1 June 1998 I.C. Light Music Tent, Pittsburgh)	ProjeKct Two
305.	"Vector Shift To Planet Cleveland I" (2 June 1998 Odeon, Cleveland)	ProjeKct Two
306.	"House II" (2 June 1998 Odeon, Cleveland)	ProjeKct Two
307.	"X chayn jiZ" (2 June 1998 Odeon, Cleveland)	ProjeKct Two
308.	"Vector Shift To Planet Belewbeloid" (2 June 1998 Odeon, Cleveland)	ProjeKct Two
309.	"Light ConstruKction" (2 June 1998 Odeon, Cleveland)	ProjeKct Two
310.	"Heavy ConstruKction" (2 June 1998 Odeon, Cleveland)	ProjeKct Two
311.	"Sus tayn Z" (2 June 1998 Odeon, Cleveland)	ProjeKct Two
312.	"Sus tayn Z Reprise" (2 June 1998 Odeon, Cleveland)	ProjeKct Two
313.	"Contrary ConstruKction" (2 June 1998 Odeon, Cleveland)	ProjeKct Two
314.	"Vector Shift To Planet Cleveland II" (2 June 1998 Odeon, Cleveland)	ProjeKct Two
315.	"House" (2 June 1998 Odeon, Cleveland)	ProjeKct Two
316.	"The Deception Of The Thrush" (2 June 1998 Odeon, Cleveland)	ProjeKct Two
317.	"Dinosaur" (2 June 1998 Odeon, Cleveland)	ProjeKct Two
318.	"VROOOM" (2 June 1998 Odeon, Cleveland)	ProjeKct Two
319.	"Vector Shift To Planet Chicago" (4 June 1998 Park West, Chicago)	ProjeKct Two
320.	"House II" (4 June 1998 Park West, Chicago)	ProjeKct Two
321.	"X chayn jiZ" (4 June 1998 Park West, Chicago)	ProjeKct Two
322.	"Sector Shift" (4 June 1998 Park West, Chicago)	ProjeKct Two
323.	"Vector Shift To Planet Belewbeloid" (4 June 1998 Park West, Chicago)	ProjeKct Two
324.	"Light ConstruKction" (4 June 1998 Park West, Chicago)	ProjeKct Two
325.	"Contrary ConstruKction" (4 June 1998 Park West, Chicago)	ProjeKct Two
326.	"Sus tayn Z" (4 June 1998 Park West, Chicago)	ProjeKct Two
327.	"Vector Shift And Search For Planet Chicago" (4 June 1998 Park West, Chicago)	ProjeKct Two
328.	"House I" (4 June 1998 Park West, Chicago)	ProjeKct Two
329.	"Heavy ConstruKction" (4 June 1998 Park West, Chicago)	ProjeKct Two
330.	"The Deception Of The Thrush" (4 June 1998 Park West, Chicago)	ProjeKct Two
331.	"RF Announcement" (4 June 1998 Park West, Chicago)	ProjeKct Two
332.	"Dinosaur" (4 June 1998 Park West, Chicago)	ProjeKct Two
333.	"VROOOM" (4 June 1998 Park West, Chicago)	ProjeKct Two
334.	"Vector Shift To Planet Chicago I" (5 June 1998 Park West, Chicago)	ProjeKct Two
335.	"Live Groove" (5 June 1998 Park West, Chicago)	ProjeKct Two
336.	"Heavy ConstruKction" (5 June 1998 Park West, Chicago)	ProjeKct Two
337.	"Vector Shift To Planet Belewbeloid" (5 June 1998 Park West, Chicago)	ProjeKct Two
338.	"Light ConstruKction" (5 June 1998 Park West, Chicago)	ProjeKct Two
339.	"Sus tayn Z" (5 June 1998 Park West, Chicago)	ProjeKct Two
340.	"The Deception Of The Thrush" (5 June 1998 Park West, Chicago)	ProjeKct Two
341.	"X chayn jiZ" (5 June 1998 Park West, Chicago)	ProjeKct Two
342.	"Vector Shift To Planet Chicago II" (5 June 1998 Park West, Chicago)	ProjeKct Two
343.	"House II" (5 June 1998 Park West, Chicago)	ProjeKct Two
344.	"Contrary ConstruKction" (5 June 1998 Park West, Chicago)	ProjeKct Two
345.	"Dinosaur" (5 June 1998 Park West, Chicago)	ProjeKct Two
346.	"VROOOM" (5 June 1998 Park West, Chicago)	ProjeKct Two
347.	"Vector Shift" (7 June 1998 Majestic Theatre, Detroit)	ProjeKct Two
348.	"Live Groove" (7 June 1998 Majestic Theatre, Detroit)	ProjeKct Two
349.	"Heavy ConstruKction" (7 June 1998 Majestic Theatre, Detroit)	ProjeKct Two
350.	"Vector Shift To Planet Belewbeloid" (7 June 1998 Majestic Theatre, Detroit)	ProjeKct Two
351.	"Light ConstruKction" (7 June 1998 Majestic Theatre, Detroit)	ProjeKct Two
352.	"Sus tayn Z" (7 June 1998 Majestic Theatre, Detroit)	ProjeKct Two
353.	"The Deception Of The Thrush" (7 June 1998 Majestic Theatre, Detroit)	ProjeKct Two
354.	"X chayn jiZ" (7 June 1998 Majestic Theatre, Detroit)	ProjeKct Two
355.	"Vector Shift" (7 June 1998 Majestic Theatre, Detroit)	ProjeKct Two
356.	"Contrary ConstruKction" (7 June 1998 Majestic Theatre, Detroit)	ProjeKct Two
357.	"Dinosaur" (7 June 1998 Majestic Theatre, Detroit)	ProjeKct Two
358.	"VROOOM" (7 June 1998 Majestic Theatre, Detroit)	ProjeKct Two
359.	"Introductory Soundscape" (28 June 1998 Somerville Theatre, Somerville)	ProjeKct Two
360.	"House I" (28 June 1998 Somerville Theatre, Somerville)	ProjeKct Two
361.	"Sus tayn Z" (28 June 1998 Somerville Theatre, Somerville)	ProjeKct Two
362.	"Vector Shift To Planet Belewbeloid" (28 June 1998 Somerville Theatre, Somerville)	ProjeKct Two
363.	"Light ConstruKction" (28 June 1998 Somerville Theatre, Somerville)	ProjeKct Two
364.	"Contrary ConstruKction" (28 June 1998 Somerville Theatre, Somerville)	ProjeKct Two
365.	"Heavy ConstruKction" (28 June 1998 Somerville Theatre, Somerville)	ProjeKct Two
366.	"Vector Shift To Plante Somerville" (28 June 1998 Somerville Theatre, Somerville)	ProjeKct Two
367.	"House II" (28 June 1998 Somerville Theatre, Somerville)	ProjeKct Two
368.	"X chayn jiZ" (28 June 1998 Somerville Theatre, Somerville)	ProjeKct Two
369.	"The Deception Of The Thrush" (28 June 1998 Somerville Theatre, Somerville)	ProjeKct Two
370.	"Dinosaur" (28 June 1998 Somerville Theatre, Somerville)	ProjeKct Two
371.	"VROOOM" (28 June 1998 Somerville Theatre, Somerville)	ProjeKct Two
372.	"Live Groove" (30 June 1998 Old Lantern, Charlotte)	ProjeKct Two
373.	"Heavy ConstruKction" (30 June 1998 Old Lantern, Charlotte)	ProjeKct Two
374.	"Vector Shift To Planet Belewbeloid" (30 June 1998 Old Lantern, Charlotte)	ProjeKct Two
375.	"Light ConstruKction" (30 June 1998 Old Lantern, Charlotte)	ProjeKct Two
376.	"Sus tayn Z" (30 June 1998 Old Lantern, Charlotte)	ProjeKct Two
377.	"Men In Helicopters" (30 June 1998 Old Lantern, Charlotte)	ProjeKct Two
378.	"Lone Rhinoceros" (30 June 1998 Old Lantern, Charlotte)	ProjeKct Two
379.	"Matte Kudasai" (30 June 1998 Old Lantern, Charlotte)	ProjeKct Two
380.	"Three Of A Perfect Pair" (30 June 1998 Old Lantern, Charlotte)	ProjeKct Two
381.	"The Deception Of The Thrush" (30 June 1998 Old Lantern, Charlotte)	ProjeKct Two
382.	"X chayn jiZ" (30 June 1998 Old Lantern, Charlotte)	ProjeKct Two
383.	"Vector Shift To Planet Charlotte" (30 June 1998 Old Lantern, Charlotte)	ProjeKct Two
384.	"House I" (30 June 1998 Old Lantern, Charlotte)	ProjeKct Two
385.	"House II" (30 June 1998 Old Lantern, Charlotte)	ProjeKct Two
386.	"Dinosaur" (30 June 1998 Old Lantern, Charlotte)	ProjeKct Two
387.	"VROOOM" (30 June 1998 Old Lantern, Charlotte)	ProjeKct Two
388.	"Vector Shift" (1 July 1998 Pearl Street, Northampton)	ProjeKct Two
389.	"House I" (1 July 1998 Pearl Street, Northampton)	ProjeKct Two
390.	"X chayn jiZ" (1 July 1998 Pearl Street, Northampton)	ProjeKct Two
391.	"Sector Shift" (1 July 1998 Pearl Street, Northampton)	ProjeKct Two
392.	"Vector Shift To Planet Belewbeloid" (1 July 1998 Pearl Street, Northampton)	ProjeKct Two
393.	"Light ConstruKction" (1 July 1998 Pearl Street, Northampton)	ProjeKct Two
394.	"Heavy ConstruKction" (1 July 1998 Pearl Street, Northampton)	ProjeKct Two
395.	"Young Lions" (1 July 1998 Pearl Street, Northampton)	ProjeKct Two
396.	"Men In Helicopters" (1 July 1998 Pearl Street, Northampton)	ProjeKct Two
397.	"Three Of A Perfect Pair" (1 July 1998 Pearl Street, Northampton)	ProjeKct Two
398.	"The Deception Of The Thrush" (1 July 1998 Pearl Street, Northampton)	ProjeKct Two
399.	"Sus tayn Z" (1 July 1998 Pearl Street, Northampton)	ProjeKct Two
400.	"Vector Shift" (1 July 1998 Pearl Street, Northampton)	ProjeKct Two
401.	"Slow House" (1 July 1998 Pearl Street, Northampton)	ProjeKct Two
402.	"Contrary ConstruKction" (1 July 1998 Pearl Street, Northampton)	ProjeKct Two
403.	"Dinosaur" (1 July 1998 Pearl Street, Northampton)	ProjeKct Two
404.	"VROOOM" (1 July 1998 Pearl Street, Northampton)	ProjeKct Two
405.	"21st Century Schizoid Man" (1 July 1998 Pearl Street, Northampton)	ProjeKct Two
406.	"Vector Shift" (3 July 1998 Talkhouse, Amagansett)	ProjeKct Two
407.	"Live Groove" (3 July 1998 Talkhouse, Amagansett)	ProjeKct Two
408.	"X chayn jiZ" (3 July 1998 Talkhouse, Amagansett)	ProjeKct Two
409.	"Vector Shift" (3 July 1998 Talkhouse, Amagansett)	ProjeKct Two
410.	"Vector Shift To Planet Belewbeloid" (3 July 1998 Talkhouse, Amagansett)	ProjeKct Two
411.	"Light ContruKction" (3 July 1998 Talkhouse, Amagansett)	ProjeKct Two
412.	"Heavy ConstruKction" (3 July 1998 Talkhouse, Amagansett)	ProjeKct Two
413.	"Lone Rhinoceros" (3 July 1998 Talkhouse, Amagansett)	ProjeKct Two
414.	"Men In Helicopters" (3 July 1998 Talkhouse, Amagansett)	ProjeKct Two
415.	"Young Lions" (3 July 1998 Talkhouse, Amagansett)	ProjeKct Two
416.	"Matte Kudasai" (3 July 1998 Talkhouse, Amagansett)	ProjeKct Two
417.	"Three Of A Perfect Pair" (3 July 1998 Talkhouse, Amagansett)	ProjeKct Two
418.	"The Deception Of The Thrush" (3 July 1998 Talkhouse, Amagansett)	ProjeKct Two
419.	"Sus tayn Z" (3 July 1998 Talkhouse, Amagansett)	ProjeKct Two
420.	"Sector Drift" (3 July 1998 Talkhouse, Amagansett)	ProjeKct Two
421.	"Slow House" (3 July 1998 Talkhouse, Amagansett)	ProjeKct Two
422.	"Contrary ConstruKction" (3 July 1998 Talkhouse, Amagansett)	ProjeKct Two
423.	"VROOOM" (3 July 1998 Talkhouse, Amagansett)	ProjeKct Two
424.	"21st Century Schizoid Man" (3 July 1998 Talkhouse, Amagansett)	ProjeKct Two
425.	"Announcement" (6 July 1998 The Guvernment, Toronto)	ProjeKct Two
426.	"Introductory Soundscape" (6 July 1998 The Guvernment, Toronto)	ProjeKct Two
427.	"House I" (6 July 1998 The Guvernment, Toronto)	ProjeKct Two
428.	"Sus tayn Z" (6 July 1998 The Guvernment, Toronto)	ProjeKct Two
429.	"Vector Drift" (6 July 1998 The Guvernment, Toronto)	ProjeKct Two
430.	"Vector Shift To Planet Belewbeloid" (6 July 1998 The Guvernment, Toronto)	ProjeKct Two
431.	"Light ConstruKction" (6 July 1998 The Guvernment, Toronto)	ProjeKct Two
432.	"Heavy ConstruKction" (6 July 1998 The Guvernment, Toronto)	ProjeKct Two
433.	"Young Lions" (6 July 1998 The Guvernment, Toronto)	ProjeKct Two
434.	"Men In Helicopters" (6 July 1998 The Guvernment, Toronto)	ProjeKct Two
435.	"Matte Kudasai" (6 July 1998 The Guvernment, Toronto)	ProjeKct Two
436.	"Three Of A Perfect Pair" (6 July 1998 The Guvernment, Toronto)	ProjeKct Two
437.	"The Deception Of The Thrush" (6 July 1998 The Guvernment, Toronto)	ProjeKct Two
438.	"X chayn jiZ" (6 July 1998 The Guvernment, Toronto)	ProjeKct Two
439.	"Vector Shift" (6 July 1998 The Guvernment, Toronto)	ProjeKct Two
440.	"Slow House" (6 July 1998 The Guvernment, Toronto)	ProjeKct Two
441.	"Contrary ConstruKction" (6 July 1998 The Guvernment, Toronto)	ProjeKct Two
442.	"Dinosaur" (6 July 1998 The Guvernment, Toronto)	ProjeKct Two
443.	"VROOOM" (6 July 1998 The Guvernment, Toronto)	ProjeKct Two
444.	"21st Century Schizoid Man" (6 July 1998 The Guvernment, Toronto)	ProjeKct Two
445.	"Introductory Soundscape" (8 July 1998 Metropolis, Montreal)	ProjeKct Two
446.	"Live Groove" (8 July 1998 Metropolis, Montreal)	ProjeKct Two
447.	"Heavy ConstruKction" (8 July 1998 Metropolis, Montreal)	ProjeKct Two
448.	"Sector Drift" (8 July 1998 Metropolis, Montreal)	ProjeKct Two
449.	"Sector Shift To Planet Belewbeloid" (8 July 1998 Metropolis, Montreal)	ProjeKct Two
450.	"Light ConstruKction" (8 July 1998 Metropolis, Montreal)	ProjeKct Two
451.	"Slow House To House I" (8 July 1998 Metropolis, Montreal)	ProjeKct Two
452.	"Young Lions" (8 July 1998 Metropolis, Montreal)	ProjeKct Two
453.	"Lone Rhinoceros" (8 July 1998 Metropolis, Montreal)	ProjeKct Two
454.	"Matte Kudasai" (8 July 1998 Metropolis, Montreal)	ProjeKct Two
455.	"Men In Helicopters" (8 July 1998 Metropolis, Montreal)	ProjeKct Two
456.	"Three Of A Perfect Pair" (8 July 1998 Metropolis, Montreal)	ProjeKct Two
457.	"The Deception Of The Thrush" (8 July 1998 Metropolis, Montreal)	ProjeKct Two
458.	"Sus tayn Z" (8 July 1998 Metropolis, Montreal)	ProjeKct Two
459.	"X chayn jiZ" (8 July 1998 Metropolis, Montreal)	ProjeKct Two
460.	"Contrary ConstruKction" (8 July 1998 Metropolis, Montreal)	ProjeKct Two
461.	"Dinosaur" (8 July 1998 Metropolis, Montreal)	ProjeKct Two
462.	"VROOOM" (8 July 1998 Metropolis, Montreal)	ProjeKct Two
463.	"21st Century Schizoid Man" (8 July 1998 Metropolis, Montreal)	ProjeKct Two

Heaven & Earth, Disc 23: Blu-ray disc 3 – The ReconstruKction Of Light / The Power To Believe - Plus Bonuses
No.	Title	Group	Length
1.	"ProzaKc Blues" (The ReconstruKction Of Light (2019 Mixes) - LPCM Stereo (24/48) DTS-HD Master Surround LPCM 5.1 Surround)	King Crimson
2.	"The ConstruKction Of Light" (The ReconstruKction Of Light (2019 Mixes) - LPCM Stereo (24/48) DTS-HD Master Surround LPCM 5.1 Surround)	King Crimson
3.	"Into The Frying Pan" (The ReconstruKction Of Light (2019 Mixes) - LPCM Stereo (24/48) DTS-HD Master Surround LPCM 5.1 Surround)	King Crimson
4.	"FraKctured" (The ReconstruKction Of Light (2019 Mixes) - LPCM Stereo (24/48) DTS-HD Master Surround LPCM 5.1 Surround)	King Crimson
5.	"The World's My Oyster Soup Kitchen Floor Wax Museum" (The ReconstruKction Of Light (2019 Mixes) - LPCM Stereo (24/48) DTS-HD Master Surround LPCM 5.1 Surround)	King Crimson
6.	"Larks' Tongues In Aspic Part IV" (The ReconstruKction Of Light (2019 Mixes) - LPCM Stereo (24/48) DTS-HD Master Surround LPCM 5.1 Surround)	King Crimson
7.	"Coda: I Have A Dream" (The ReconstruKction Of Light (2019 Mixes) - LPCM Stereo (24/48) DTS-HD Master Surround LPCM 5.1 Surround)	King Crimson
8.	"Heaven And Earth" (The ReconstruKction Of Light (2019 Mixes) - LPCM Stereo (24/48) DTS-HD Master Surround LPCM 5.1 Surround)	ProjeKct X
9.	"ProzaKc Blues" (The ConstruKction Of Light (2000) - LPCM Stereo (24/48))	King Crimson
10.	"The ConstruKction Of Light" (The ConstruKction Of Light (2000) - LPCM Stereo (24/48))	King Crimson
11.	"Into The Frying Pan" (The ConstruKction Of Light (2000) - LPCM Stereo (24/48))	King Crimson
12.	"FraKctured" (The ConstruKction Of Light (2000) - LPCM Stereo (24/48))	King Crimson
13.	"The World's My Oyster Soup Kitchen Floor Wax Museum" (The ConstruKction Of Light (2000) - LPCM Stereo (24/48))	King Crimson
14.	"Larks' Tongues In Aspic Part IV" (The ConstruKction Of Light (2000) - LPCM Stereo (24/48))	King Crimson
15.	"Coda: I Have A Dream" (The ConstruKction Of Light (2000) - LPCM Stereo (24/48))	King Crimson
16.	"Heaven And Earth" (The ConstruKction Of Light (2000) - LPCM Stereo (24/48))	ProjeKct X
17.	"The Power To Believe I: A Cappella" (The Power To Believe (2019 Master) - LPCM Stereo (24/48) DTS-HD Master Surround LPCM 5.1 Surround)	King Crimson
18.	"Level Five" (The Power To Believe (2019 Master) - LPCM Stereo (24/48) DTS-HD Master Surround LPCM 5.1 Surround)	King Crimson
19.	"Eyes Wide Open" (The Power To Believe (2019 Master) - LPCM Stereo (24/48) DTS-HD Master Surround LPCM 5.1 Surround)	King Crimson
20.	"EleKtriK" (The Power To Believe (2019 Master) - LPCM Stereo (24/48) DTS-HD Master Surround LPCM 5.1 Surround)	King Crimson
21.	"Facts Of Life: Intro" (The Power To Believe (2019 Master) - LPCM Stereo (24/48) DTS-HD Master Surround LPCM 5.1 Surround)	King Crimson
22.	"Facts Of Life" (The Power To Believe (2019 Master) - LPCM Stereo (24/48) DTS-HD Master Surround LPCM 5.1 Surround)	King Crimson
23.	"The Power To Believe II" (The Power To Believe (2019 Master) - LPCM Stereo (24/48) DTS-HD Master Surround LPCM 5.1 Surround)	King Crimson
24.	"Dangerous Curves" (The Power To Believe (2019 Master) - LPCM Stereo (24/48) DTS-HD Master Surround LPCM 5.1 Surround)	King Crimson
25.	"Happy With What You Have To Be Happy With" (The Power To Believe (2019 Master) - LPCM Stereo (24/48) DTS-HD Master Surround LPCM 5.1 Surround)	King Crimson
26.	"The Power To Believe III" (The Power To Believe (2019 Master) - LPCM Stereo (24/48) DTS-HD Master Surround LPCM 5.1 Surround)	King Crimson
27.	"The Power To Believe IV: Coda" (The Power To Believe (2019 Master) - LPCM Stereo (24/48) DTS-HD Master Surround LPCM 5.1 Surround)	King Crimson
28.	"Sus-tayn-Z I" (Bonus Tracks)	King Crimson
29.	"Superslow" (Bonus Tracks)	King Crimson
30.	"Sus-tayn-Z II" (Bonus Tracks)	King Crimson
31.	"The Power To Believe I: A Cappella" (The Power To Believe (2003) - LPCM Stereo (24/48))	King Crimson
32.	"Level Five" (The Power To Believe (2003) - LPCM Stereo (24/48))	King Crimson
33.	"Eyes Wide Open" (The Power To Believe (2003) - LPCM Stereo (24/48))	King Crimson
34.	"EleKtriK" (The Power To Believe (2003) - LPCM Stereo (24/48))	King Crimson
35.	"Facts Of Life: Intro" (The Power To Believe (2003) - LPCM Stereo (24/48))	King Crimson
36.	"Facts Of Life" (The Power To Believe (2003) - LPCM Stereo (24/48))	King Crimson
37.	"The Power To Believe II" (The Power To Believe (2003) - LPCM Stereo (24/48))	King Crimson
38.	"Dangerous Curves" (The Power To Believe (2003) - LPCM Stereo (24/48))	King Crimson
39.	"Happy With What You Have To Be Happy With" (The Power To Believe (2003) - LPCM Stereo (24/48))	King Crimson
40.	"The Power To Believe III" (The Power To Believe (2003) - LPCM Stereo (24/48))	King Crimson
41.	"The Power To Believe IV: Coda" (The Power To Believe (2003) - LPCM Stereo (24/48))	King Crimson
42.	"Bude" (Additional Material - Happy With What You Have To Be Happy With - LPCM Stereo (24/48))	King Crimson
43.	"Happy With What You Have To Be Happy With" (Additional Material - Happy With What You Have To Be Happy With - LPCM Stereo (24/48))	King Crimson
44.	"Mie Gakure" (Additional Material - Happy With What You Have To Be Happy With - LPCM Stereo (24/48))	King Crimson
45.	"She Shudders" (Additional Material - Happy With What You Have To Be Happy With - LPCM Stereo (24/48))	King Crimson
46.	"Eyes Wide Open (Acoustic Version)" (Additional Material - Happy With What You Have To Be Happy With - LPCM Stereo (24/48))	King Crimson
47.	"ShoGaNai" (Additional Material - Happy With What You Have To Be Happy With - LPCM Stereo (24/48))	King Crimson
48.	"I Ran" (Additional Material - Happy With What You Have To Be Happy With - LPCM Stereo (24/48))	King Crimson
49.	"Potato Pie" (Additional Material - Happy With What You Have To Be Happy With - LPCM Stereo (24/48))	King Crimson
50.	"Larks' Tongues In Aspic Part IV" (Additional Material - Happy With What You Have To Be Happy With - LPCM Stereo (24/48))	King Crimson
51.	"Clouds" (Additional Material - Happy With What You Have To Be Happy With - LPCM Stereo (24/48))	King Crimson
52.	"Einstein's Relatives" (Additional Material - Happy With What You Have To Be Happy With - LPCM Stereo (24/48))	King Crimson
53.	"Dangerous Curves" (Additional Material - Level Five - LPCM Stereo (24/48))	King Crimson
54.	"Level Five" (Additional Material - Level Five - LPCM Stereo (24/48))	King Crimson
55.	"Virtuous Circle" (Additional Material - Level Five - LPCM Stereo (24/48))	King Crimson
56.	"The ConstruKction Of Light" (Additional Material - Level Five - LPCM Stereo (24/48))	King Crimson
57.	"The Deception Of The Thrush" (Additional Material - Level Five - LPCM Stereo (24/48))	King Crimson
58.	"Improv: ProjeKct X" (Additional Material - Level Five - LPCM Stereo (24/48))	King Crimson
59.	"Into The Frying Pan" (Live At The Shepherd's Bush Empire, London 3 July 2000 - LPCM Stereo (24/48))	King Crimson
60.	"The ConstruKction Of Light" (Live At The Shepherd's Bush Empire, London 3 July 2000 - LPCM Stereo (24/48))	King Crimson
61.	"VROOOM" (Live At The Shepherd's Bush Empire, London 3 July 2000 - LPCM Stereo (24/48))	King Crimson
62.	"One Time" (Live At The Shepherd's Bush Empire, London 3 July 2000 - LPCM Stereo (24/48))	King Crimson
63.	"London Improv 1: Blasticus SS Blastica" (Live At The Shepherd's Bush Empire, London 3 July 2000 - LPCM Stereo (24/48))	King Crimson
64.	"Dinosaur" (Live At The Shepherd's Bush Empire, London 3 July 2000 - LPCM Stereo (24/48))	King Crimson
65.	"The World's My Oyster Soup Kitchen Floor Wax Museum" (Live At The Shepherd's Bush Empire, London 3 July 2000 - LPCM Stereo (24/48))	King Crimson
66.	"London Improv 2: Blasticum" (Live At The Shepherd's Bush Empire, London 3 July 2000 - LPCM Stereo (24/48))	King Crimson
67.	"Cage" (Live At The Shepherd's Bush Empire, London 3 July 2000 - LPCM Stereo (24/48))	King Crimson
68.	"ProzaKc Blues" (Live At The Shepherd's Bush Empire, London 3 July 2000 - LPCM Stereo (24/48))	King Crimson
69.	"Larks' Tongues In Aspic Part IV" (Live At The Shepherd's Bush Empire, London 3 July 2000 - LPCM Stereo (24/48))	King Crimson
70.	"Three Of A Perfect Pair" (Live At The Shepherd's Bush Empire, London 3 July 2000 - LPCM Stereo (24/48))	King Crimson
71.	"The Deception Of The Thrush" (Live At The Shepherd's Bush Empire, London 3 July 2000 - LPCM Stereo (24/48))	King Crimson
72.	"Sex Sleep Eat Drink Dream" (Live At The Shepherd's Bush Empire, London 3 July 2000 - LPCM Stereo (24/48))	King Crimson
73.	"Heroes" (Live At The Shepherd's Bush Empire, London 3 July 2000 - LPCM Stereo (24/48))	King Crimson
74.	"Introductory Soundscape" (EleKtriK, Live At Kouseinekin Kaikan, Tokyo 16 April 2003 - LPCM Stereo (24/48) DTS-HD Master Surround LPCM 5.1 Surround)	King Crimson
75.	"The Power To Believe I: A Cappella" (EleKtriK, Live At Kouseinekin Kaikan, Tokyo 16 April 2003 - LPCM Stereo (24/48) DTS-HD Master Surround LPCM 5.1 Surround)	King Crimson
76.	"Level Five" (EleKtriK, Live At Kouseinekin Kaikan, Tokyo 16 April 2003 - LPCM Stereo (24/48) DTS-HD Master Surround LPCM 5.1 Surround)	King Crimson
77.	"ProzaKc Blues" (EleKtriK, Live At Kouseinekin Kaikan, Tokyo 16 April 2003 - LPCM Stereo (24/48) DTS-HD Master Surround LPCM 5.1 Surround)	King Crimson
78.	"The ConstruKction Of Light" (EleKtriK, Live At Kouseinekin Kaikan, Tokyo 16 April 2003 - LPCM Stereo (24/48) DTS-HD Master Surround LPCM 5.1 Surround)	King Crimson
79.	"Happy With What You Have To Be Happy With" (EleKtriK, Live At Kouseinekin Kaikan, Tokyo 16 April 2003 - LPCM Stereo (24/48) DTS-HD Master Surround LPCM 5.1 Surround)	King Crimson
80.	"EleKtriK" (EleKtriK, Live At Kouseinekin Kaikan, Tokyo 16 April 2003 - LPCM Stereo (24/48) DTS-HD Master Surround LPCM 5.1 Surround)	King Crimson
81.	"One Time" (EleKtriK, Live At Kouseinekin Kaikan, Tokyo 16 April 2003 - LPCM Stereo (24/48) DTS-HD Master Surround LPCM 5.1 Surround)	King Crimson
82.	"Facts Of Life" (EleKtriK, Live At Kouseinekin Kaikan, Tokyo 16 April 2003 - LPCM Stereo (24/48) DTS-HD Master Surround LPCM 5.1 Surround)	King Crimson
83.	"The Power To Believe II Power CIrcle" (EleKtriK, Live At Kouseinekin Kaikan, Tokyo 16 April 2003 - LPCM Stereo (24/48) DTS-HD Master Surround LPCM 5.1 Surround)	King Crimson
84.	"Dangerous Curves" (EleKtriK, Live At Kouseinekin Kaikan, Tokyo 16 April 2003 - LPCM Stereo (24/48) DTS-HD Master Surround LPCM 5.1 Surround)	King Crimson
85.	"Larks' Tongues In Aspic Part IV" (EleKtriK, Live At Kouseinekin Kaikan, Tokyo 16 April 2003 - LPCM Stereo (24/48) DTS-HD Master Surround LPCM 5.1 Surround)	King Crimson
86.	"The Deception Of The Thrush" (EleKtriK, Live At Kouseinekin Kaikan, Tokyo 16 April 2003 - LPCM Stereo (24/48) DTS-HD Master Surround LPCM 5.1 Surround)	King Crimson
87.	"The World's My Oyster Soup Kitchen Floor Wax Museum" (EleKtriK, Live At Kouseinekin Kaikan, Tokyo 16 April 2003 - LPCM Stereo (24/48) DTS-HD Master Surround LPCM 5.1 Surround)	King Crimson
88.	"Studio Tour" (Video Content)	King Crimson

Heaven & Earth, Disc 24: Blu-ray disc 4 – Bootleg TV - Europe 2000 - Video Content
No.	Title	Group	Length
1.	"Larks' Tongues In Aspic, Part IV" (27 & 28 May 2000 Amager Bio, Copenhagen)	King Crimson
2.	"Improv:Copenhagen" (27 & 28 May 2000 Amager Bio, Copenhagen)	King Crimson
3.	"FraKctured" (30 May 2000 Columbia, Berlin)	King Crimson
4.	"One Time" (30 May 2000 Columbia, Berlin)	King Crimson
5.	"Improv: Berlin" (30 May 2000 Columbia, Berlin)	King Crimson
6.	"The Deception Of The Trush" (30 May 2000 Columbia, Berlin)	King Crimson
7.	"Dinosaur" (2 June 2000 Serenadenhof, Nurnberg)	King Crimson
8.	"Improv: Nurnberg" (2 June 2000 Serenadenhof, Nurnberg)	King Crimson
9.	"Three Of A Perfect Pair" (2 June 2000 Serenadenhof, Nurnberg)	King Crimson
10.	"ProzaKc Blues" (3 June 2000 Liederhalle, Stuttgart)	King Crimson
11.	"FraKctured" (3 June 2000 Liederhalle, Stuttgart)	King Crimson
12.	"Improv: Stuttgart" (3 June 2000 Liederhalle, Stuttgart)	King Crimson
13.	"Into The Frying Pan" (4 June 2000 Circus Krone, Munich)	King Crimson
14.	"Improv: Munich" (4 June 2000 Circus Krone, Munich)	King Crimson
15.	"The World's My Oyster Soup Kitchen Floor Wax Museum" (4 June 2000 Circus Krone, Munich)	King Crimson
16.	"The ConstruKction Of Light" (6 June 2000 Museumsplatz, Bonn)	King Crimson
17.	"FraKctured" (6 June 2000 Museumsplatz, Bonn)	King Crimson
18.	"The World's My Oyster Soup Kitchen Floor Wax Museum" (6 June 2000 Museumsplatz, Bonn)	King Crimson
19.	"Improv: Bonn" (6 June 2000 Museumsplatz, Bonn)	King Crimson
20.	"Sex Sleep Eat Drink Dream" (7 June 2000 Stadthalle, Offenbach)	King Crimson
21.	"Improv: Offenbach" (7 June 2000 Stadthalle, Offenbach)	King Crimson
22.	"Cage" (7 June 2000 Stadthalle, Offenbach)	King Crimson
23.	"The Deception Of The Thrush" (7 June 2000 Stadthalle, Offenbach)	King Crimson
24.	"Improv: Poznan 1" (9 June 2000 Arena, Poznan)	King Crimson
25.	"VROOOM" (9 June 2000 Arena, Poznan)	King Crimson
26.	"Improv: Poznan 2" (9 June 2000 Arena, Poznan)	King Crimson
27.	"Cage" (9 June 2000 Arena, Poznan)	King Crimson
28.	"Improv: Warsaw 1" (10 June 2000 Roma, Warsaw)	King Crimson
29.	"The Deception Of The Thrush" (10 June 2000 Roma, Warsaw)	King Crimson
30.	"ProzaKc Blues" (11 June 2000 Roma, Warsaw)	King Crimson
31.	"The ConstruKction Of Light" (11 June 2000 Roma, Warsaw)	King Crimson
32.	"Improv: Warsaw 2" (11 June 2000 Roma, Warsaw)	King Crimson
33.	"The Deception Of The Thrush" (11 June 2000 Roma, Warsaw)	King Crimson
34.	"Improv: Prague 1" (13 June 2000 Archa Theatre, Prague)	King Crimson
35.	"VROOOM" (13 June 2000 Archa Theatre, Prague)	King Crimson
36.	"Lights Please" (13 June 2000 Archa Theatre, Prague)	King Crimson
37.	"Improv: Prague 2" (13 June 2000 Archa Theatre, Prague)	King Crimson
38.	"Larks' Tongues In Aspic Part IV" (13 June 2000 Archa Theatre, Prague)	King Crimson
39.	"Improv: Leipzig 1" (14 June 2000 Haus Auensee, Leipzig)	King Crimson
40.	"Into The Frying Pan" (14 June 2000 Haus Auensee, Leipzig)	King Crimson
41.	"Improv: Leipzig 2" (14 June 2000 Haus Auensee, Leipzig)	King Crimson
42.	"The World's My Oyster Soup Kitchen Floor Wax Museum" (20 June 2000 Piazza Cima, Cinegliano)	King Crimson
43.	"Improv: Cinegliano" (20 June 2000 Piazza Cima, Cinegliano)	King Crimson
44.	"Sex Sleep Eat Drink Dream" (20 June 2000 Piazza Cima, Cinegliano)	King Crimson
45.	"The ConstruKction Of Light" (21 June 2000 L'Ampiteatro, Gardone Riviera)	King Crimson
46.	"Improv: Gardone Riviera 1" (21 June 2000 L'Ampiteatro, Gardone Riviera)	King Crimson
47.	"Dinosaur" (21 June 2000 L'Ampiteatro, Gardone Riviera)	King Crimson
48.	"Improv: Gardone Riviera 2" (21 June 2000 L'Ampiteatro, Gardone Riviera)	King Crimson
49.	"Improv: Legnano 1" (22 June 2000 Campo del Amicizia, Legnano)	King Crimson
50.	"One Time" (22 June 2000 Campo del Amicizia, Legnano)	King Crimson
51.	"FraKctured" (22 June 2000 Campo del Amicizia, Legnano)	King Crimson
52.	"Improv: Legnano 2" (22 June 2000 Campo del Amicizia, Legnano)	King Crimson
53.	"Improv: Rome 1" (23 June 2000 Citta Della Musica, Rome)	King Crimson
54.	"Larks' Tongues In Aspic Part IV" (23 June 2000 Citta Della Musica, Rome)	King Crimson
55.	"Cage" (23 June 2000 Citta Della Musica, Rome)	King Crimson
56.	"The World's My Oyster Soup Kitchen Floor Wax Museum" (23 June 2000 Citta Della Musica, Rome)	King Crimson
57.	"Improv: Rome 2" (23 June 2000 Citta Della Musica, Rome)	King Crimson
58.	"ProzaKc Blues" (25 June 2000 Olympia, Paris)	King Crimson
59.	"Improv: Paris" (25 June 2000 Olympia, Paris)	King Crimson
60.	"Larks' Tongues In Aspic Part IV" (25 June 2000 Olympia, Paris)	King Crimson
61.	"Into The Frying Pan" (27 June 2000 Zeleste, Barcelona)	King Crimson
62.	"Improv: Barcelona 1" (27 June 2000 Zeleste, Barcelona)	King Crimson
63.	"Sex Sleep Eat Drink Deam" (27 June 2000 Zeleste, Barcelona)	King Crimson
64.	"The World's My Oyster Soup Kitchen Floor Wax Museum" (27 June 2000 Zeleste, Barcelona)	King Crimson
65.	"Improv: Barcelona 2" (27 June 2000 Zeleste, Barcelona)	King Crimson
66.	"Improv: San Sebastian" (28 June 2000 Teatro Kursaal, San Sebastian)	King Crimson
67.	"Three Of A Perfect Pair" (28 June 2000 Teatro Kursaal, San Sebastian)	King Crimson
68.	"The Deception Of The Thrush" (28 June 2000 Teatro Kursaal, San Sebastian)	King Crimson
69.	"Improv: Madrid 1" (29 June 2000 Riviera, Madrid)	King Crimson
70.	"The World's My Oyster Soup Kitchen Floor Wax Museum" (29 June 2000 Riviera, Madrid)	King Crimson
71.	"Improv: Madrid 2" (29 June 2000 Riviera, Madrid)	King Crimson
72.	"Heroes" (29 June 2000 Riviera, Madrid)	King Crimson

== Personnel ==
King Crimson

- Adrian Belew – guitar, vocals
- Robert Fripp – guitar
- Trey Gunn – Warr guitar
- Pat Mastelotto – drums, percussion
- Tony Levin – bass
- Gavin Harrison – drums
