= The 21st Century Guide to King Crimson – Volume Two – 1981–2003 =

The 21st Century Guide to King Crimson Volume Two: 1981–2003

Box set by King Crimson
- Released: 2005
- Recorded: 1981–2003
- Genre: Progressive rock
- Label: Discipline Global Mobile
- Producer: Robert Fripp

King Crimson chronology
The 21st Century Guide to King Crimson – Volume One – 1969–1974 (2004)	The 21st Century Guide to King Crimson Volume Two: 1981–2003 (2005)	The Condensed 21st Century Guide to King Crimson (2006)

Professional ratings
Review scores
Source	Rating
Allmusic	4/5 stars

The 21st Century Guide to King Crimson – Volume Two – 1981–2003 is a 4-CD retrospective box set of the English progressive rock band King Crimson, issued in 2005. A follow-up to the previous year's The 21st Century Guide to King Crimson – Volume One – 1969–1974, the second set features studio and live recordings from the group's 1981–2003 phase. A 2-CD distillation of the two volumes,The Condensed 21st Century Guide to King Crimson, appeared in 2006.

== Track listing ==
=== Disc One: In the Studio: 1981–1984 ===
All songs written by Adrian Belew, Bill Bruford, Robert Fripp, and Tony Levin, except where noted.

1. "Elephant Talk" – 4:44
2. "Frame by Frame" – 5:08
3. "Matte Kudasai" – 3:46
4. "Thela Hun Ginjeet" – 6:26
5. "The Sheltering Sky" – 8:23
6. "Discipline" – 5:02
7. "Heartbeat" – 3:54
8. "Waiting Man" – 4:26
9. "Neurotica" – 4:49
10. "Requiem" – 6:36
11. "Three of a Perfect Pair" – 4:10
12. "Sleepless" – 5:24

==== Bonus tracks: 1983–2004 ====
1. "The King Crimson Barber Shop" (Levin) – 1:36
2. "Form No. 1" (Belew, Fripp, Levin, Pat Mastelotto) – 3:03
3. "Bude" (Belew) – 0:25
4. "Potato Pie" (abridged) (Belew, Fripp, Trey Gunn, Mastelotto) – 4:33
5. "Clouds" (Belew) – 0:33
6. "Einstein's Relatives" (Belew, Fripp, Gunn, Mastelotto) – 3:08
- Tracks 1–6 from Discipline (1981)
- Tracks 7–10 from Beat (1982)
- Tracks 11–12 from Three of a Perfect Pair (1984)
- Bonus track 1 from Frame by Frame: The Essential King Crimson, Heartbeat: The Abbreviated King Crimson (both from 1991), and the 2001 reissue of Three of a Perfect Pair
- Bonus tracks 3–6 from the Happy with What You Have to Be Happy With EP (2002)
- Bonus track 2 previously unreleased (2005)

=== Disc Two: Live: 1981–1984 ===
All songs written by Belew, Bruford, Fripp, and Levin.

1. "Entry of the Crims" (Live at Le Spectrum, Montreal, Quebec, Canada, 11 July 1984) – 4:42
2. "Larks' Tongues in Aspic Part III" (Abridged) (Live at Le Spectrum, Montreal, Quebec, Canada, 11 July 1984) – 2:47
3. "Thela Hun Ginjeet" (Live at Le Spectrum, Montreal, Quebec, Canada, 11 July 1984) – 5:54
4. "Matte Kudasai" (Live at Le Spectrum, Montreal, Quebec, Canada, 11 July 1984) – 3:40
5. "The Sheltering Sky" (Live at the Arena, Fréjus, France, 27 August 1982) – 10:32
6. "Neal and Jack and Me" (Live at the Arena, Frejus, France, 27 August 1982) – 5:39
7. "Indiscipline" (Live at Le Spectrum, Montreal, Quebec, Canada, 11 July 1984) – 8:10
8. "Sartori in Tangier" (Live at Le Spectrum, Montreal, Quebec, Canada, 11 July 1984) – 4:21
9. "Frame by Frame" (Live at Le Spectrum, Montreal, Quebec, Canada, 11 July 1984) – 3:55
10. "Man with an Open Heart" (Live at Le Spectrum, Montreal, Quebec, Canada, 11 July 1984) – 3:40
11. "Waiting Man" (Live at Le Spectrum, Montreal, Quebec, Canada, 11 July 1984) – 6:00
12. "Sleepless" (Live at Le Spectrum, Montreal, Quebec, Canada, 11 July 1984) – 6:11
13. "Three of a Perfect Pair" (Live at Le Spectrum, Montreal, Quebec, Canada, 11 July 1984) – 4:24
14. "Discipline" (Live at Le Spectrum, Montreal, Quebec, Canada, 11 July 1984) – 4:52
15. "Elephant Talk" (Live at the Arena, Cap D'Agde, Agde, France, 26 August 1982) – 5:02
- Tracks 1–4 & 7–14 from Absent Lovers: Live in Montreal (1998)
- Tracks 5–6 from Neal and Jack and Me (2004)
- Track 15 from Live at Cap D'Agde (1999)

=== Disc Three: In the Studio 1995–2003 ===
Tracks 1–8 written by Belew, Bruford, Fripp, Gunn, Levin, and Mastelotto and tracks 9–18 written by Belew, Fripp, Gunn, and Mastelotto, except where noted.

1. "VROOOM" – 4:48
2. "Coda: Marine 475" – 2:41
3. "Dinosaur" – 6:37
4. "Walking on Air" – 4:38
5. "B'Boom" – 4:11
6. "THRAK" (Abridged) – 0:43
7. "Fearless and Highly THRaKked" (Abridged) – 3:50
8. "Sex Sleep Eat Drink Dream" – 4:44
9. "Radio II" (Abridged) – 0:43
10. "The Power to Believe I: A Cappella" (Belew) – 0:43
11. "Level Five" – 7:15
12. "Eyes Wide Open" – 4:10
13. "Elektrik" – 8:00
14. "Facts of Life: Intro" – 1:38
15. "Facts of Life" – 5:05
16. "The Power to Believe II: Power Circle" – 7:44
17. "Happy with What You Have to Be Happy With" – 3:30
18. "The Power to Believe III: The Deception of the Thrush" – 4:12
19. "The Power to Believe IV: Coda" (Fripp) – 2:24
- Tracks 1–6, 8–9 from THRAK (1995)
- Track 7 from THRaKaTTaK (1996)
- Tracks from 10 to 19 from The Power to Believe (2003)

=== Disc Four: Live: 1994–2003 ===
1. "VROOOM VROOOM" (Belew, Bruford, Fripp, Gunn, Levin, Mastelotto) (Live at the Metropolitan Theater, Mexico City, Mexico, August 1996) – 5:03
2. "Neurotica" (Belew, Bruford, Fripp, Levin) (Live at the Metropolitan Theater, Mexico City, Mexico, August 1996) – 3:39
3. "Prism" (Abridged) (Pierre Favre) (Live at the Metropolitan Theater, Mexico City, Mexico, August 1996) – 2:54
4. "One Time" (Belew, Bruford, Fripp, Gunn, Levin, Mastelotto) (Live at Prix D'Ami, Buenos Aires, Argentina, 29 September 1994) – 6:53
5. "Larks' Tongues in Aspic Part IV" (Including "Coda: I Have a Dream") (Belew, Fripp, Gunn, Mastelotto) (Live at the 328 Performance Hall, Nashville, Tennessee, 10 November 2001) – 10:47
6. "ProzaKc Blues" (Belew, Fripp, Gunn, Mastelotto) (Live at the Kōsei Nenkin, Tokyo, Japan, 16 April 2003) – 5:28
7. "the construKction of light" (Belew, Fripp, Gunn, Mastelotto) (Live at the Community Theater, Berkeley, California, 10 August 2001) – 8:39
8. "FraKctured" (Belew, Fripp, Gunn, Mastelotto) (Live edit of: Amager Bio, Copenhagen, Denmark, 27 or 28 May 2000 & Museumplatz, Bonn, Germany, 6 June 2000) – 8:38
9. "The World's My Oyster Soup Kitchen Floor Wax Museum" (Belew, Fripp, Gunn, Mastelotto) (Live at the Kōsei Nenkin, Tokyo, Japan, 16 April 2003) – 5:50
10. "Sus-Tayn-Z" (ProjeKct Two) (Belew, Fripp, Gunn) (Live at Pearl Street, Northampton, Massachusetts, 1 July 1998) – 7:51
11. "X-chayn-jiZ" (ProjeKct Two) (Belew, Fripp, Gunn) (Live at Pearl Street, Northampton, Massachusetts, 1 July 1998) – 4:18
12. "The Deception of the Thrush" (Abridged) (Belew, Fripp, Gunn, Mastelotto) (Live at Shepherd's Bush Empire, London, England, 3 July 2000) – 5:20
13. "2ii3" (ProjeKct One) (Abridged) (Bruford, Fripp, Gunn, Levin) (Live at The Jazz Café, Camden Town, London, England, 2 December 1997) – 1:57
- Tracks 10–11 & 13 from The ProjeKcts (1999)
- Track 7 from the Level Five EP (2001)
- Tracks 1–3 from Vrooom Vrooom (2001)
- Track 5 from the Happy with What You Have to Be Happy With EP
- Tracks 6, 9, & 12 from Eyes Wide Open (2003)
- Tracks 4 & 8 previously unreleased

== Personnel ==
- Robert Fripp – guitar, organ, Frippertronics, soundscapes, and mellotron on all tracks
- Adrian Belew – fretted/fretless guitars, lead vocals, and lyrics on all tracks
- Tony Levin – Chapman Stick, bass guitar, upright bass, synth, backing vocals on discs 1–2, disc 3, tracks 1–9, & disc 4, tracks 1–4
- Bill Bruford – acoustic and electronic drums on discs 1–2, disc 3, tracks 1–9, & disc 4, tracks 1–4
- Trey Gunn – Chapman Stick, bass touch guitar, baritone guitar, Warr guitar, fretless Warr guitar, and backing vocals on discs 3–4
- Pat Mastelotto – acoustic/electronic percussion and drum programming on discs 3–4
