= The Gates of Paradise =

The Gates of Paradise may refer to:

- The Gates of Paradise (novel), a 1960 novel by Jerzy Andrzejewski
- The Gates of Paradise (album), a 1998 album by Robert Fripp

== See also ==
- Gates of Paradise, a novel by V. C. Andrews
- Gates to Paradise, a 1968 Polish film
