= Live at Jacksonville =

Live album by King Crimson
- Released: December 1998
- Recorded: February 26, 1972
- Venue: Baseball Park, Jacksonville, Florida, United States
- Genre: Progressive rock, jazz fusion
- Length: 60:30
- Label: Discipline Global Mobile
- Producer: Robert Fripp and David Singleton

King Crimson Collector's Club chronology
| Live at the Marquee (1998) | Live at Jacksonville (1998) | The Beat Club, Bremen (1999) |

Professional ratings
Review scores
| Source | Rating |
|---|---|
| AllMusic | 2.5/5 stars |

Live at Jacksonville is a live album by the band King Crimson, released through the King Crimson Collector's Club in December 1998.

The concert presented was recorded at the Baseball Park, Jacksonville, Florida, USA on February 26, 1972. Part of "Sailor's Tale" had previously been released on the live album Earthbound in 1972.

The album includes liner notes by the band's guitarist, Robert Fripp.

== Track listing ==
1. "Pictures of a City" (Fripp, Sinfield) – 9:47
2. "Cirkus" (Fripp, Sinfield) – 9:08
3. "Ladies of the Road" (Fripp, Sinfield) – 6:39
4. "Formentera Lady" (Fripp, Sinfield) – 10:21
5. "Sailor's Tale" (Fripp) – 14:06
6. "21st Century Schizoid Man" (Fripp, McDonald, Lake, Giles, Sinfield) – 10:25

== Personnel ==
King Crimson

- Robert Fripp – electric guitar, Mellotron, Hohner Pianet
- Mel Collins – saxophone, flute, Mellotron
- Boz Burrell – bass guitar, lead vocals
- Ian Wallace – drums, percussion, backing vocals

Production personnel

- Alex R. Mundy – digital editing
- David Singleton – mastering
- Hugh O'Donnell – design
