= The 21st Century Guide to King Crimson – Volume One – 1969–1974 =

Box set by King Crimson
- Released: 2004
- Recorded: 1969–1974
- Genre: Progressive rock
- Label: Discipline Global Mobile
- Producer: Robert Fripp

King Crimson chronology
The Power to Believe Tour Box (2003)	The 21st Century Guide to King Crimson – Volume One – 1969–1974 (2004)	The 21st Century Guide to King Crimson – Volume Two – 1981–2003 (2005)

Professional ratings
Review scores
Source	Rating
Allmusic	4.5/5 stars
Classic Rock	4/5 stars

The 21st Century Guide to King Crimson – Volume One – 1969–1974 is a 4-CD retrospective box set of the English progressive rock band King Crimson, issued in 2004. This set contains both studio and live performances ranging from the beginnings of the band in 1969 to their first dissolution in 1974. It was followed by The 21st Century Guide to King Crimson – Volume Two – 1981–2003 in 2005. A 2-CD distillation of the two volumes,The Condensed 21st Century Guide to King Crimson, appeared in 2006.

== Track listing ==
=== Disc One: In the Studio: 1969–1971 ===
1. "21st Century Schizoid Man" (Including "Mirrors") (Robert Fripp, Ian McDonald, Greg Lake, Michael Giles, Peter Sinfield) – 7:24
2. "I Talk to the Wind" (McDonald, Sinfield) – 6:05
3. "Epitaph" (Including "March for No Reason" and "Tomorrow and Tomorrow") (Fripp, McDonald, Lake, Giles, Sinfield) – 8:47
4. "Moonchild" (Abridged) (Fripp, McDonald, Lake, Giles, Sinfield) – 3:37
5. "The Court of the Crimson King" (Including "The Return of the Fire Witch" and "The Dance of the Puppets") (McDonald, Sinfield) – 9:27
6. "Peace – A Theme" (Fripp) – 1:14
7. "Cat Food" (Fripp, Sinfield, McDonald) – 4:52
8. "Groon" (Fripp) – 3:32
9. "Cadence and Cascade" (Fripp, Sinfield) – 4:37
10. "In the Wake of Poseidon" (Instrumental edit) (Fripp, Sinfield) – 4:02
11. "Ladies of the Road" (Fripp, Sinfield) – 5:30
12. "Sailor's Tale" (Abridged) (Fripp) – 7:19
13. "Islands" (Instrumental edit) (Fripp, Sinfield) – 5:30
14. "Tuning Up" – 0:49 (NOTE: it was originally an untitled hidden track after the title track ended)
15. "Bolero" (excerpt from the "Lizard" suite) (Fripp, Sinfield) – 6:24 (NOTE: the song's full title was "Bolero – The Peacock's Tale")
- Tracks 1–5 from In the Court of the Crimson King (1969)
- Tracks 6–7 & 9–10 from In the Wake of Poseidon (1970)
- Track 8 released as the B-side of the Cat Food/Groon single (1970)
- Track 11–14 from Islands (1971)
- Track 15 from Lizard (1970)

=== Disc Two: Live: 1969–1972 ===
1. "The Court of the Crimson King" (McDonald, Sinfield) (Live at Fillmore West, San Francisco, California, 14 Dec. 1969) – 6:55
2. "A Man, a City" (Fripp, McDonald, Lake, Giles, Sinfield) (Live at Fillmore East, Manhattan, New York City, New York, 21 Nov. 1969) – 12:10
3. "21st Century Schizoid Man" (Fripp, McDonald, Lake, Giles, Sinfield) (Live at Fillmore East, Manhattan, New York City, New York, 21 Nov. 1969) – 7:30
4. "Get Thy Bearings" (Donovan Leitch, arr. by Fripp, McDonald, Lake, Giles) (Live at the Chesterfield Jazz Club, Chesterfield, Derbyshire, 7 Sept. 1969) – 10:53
5. "Mars: The Bringer of War" (Gustav Holst, arr. by Fripp, McDonald, Lake, Giles) (Live at Fillmore West, San Francisco, California, 13 Dec. 1969) – 8:55
6. "Pictures of a City" (Fripp, Sinfield) (Live at the Summit Studios, Denver, Colorado, 12 Mar. 1972) – 8:44
7. "The Letters" (Fripp, Sinfield) (Live at the Plymouth Guildhall, Devon, England, 11 May 1971) – 4:28
8. "Sailor's Tale" (Fripp) (Live at the Baseball Park, Jacksonville, Florida, 26 Feb. 1972) – 4:49
9. "Groon" (Abridged) (Fripp) (Live in Wilmington, Delaware, 11 Feb. 1972) – 6:44
10. "21st Century Schizoid Man" (Instrumental edit) (Fripp, McDonald, Lake, Giles, McDonald) (Live in Wilmington, Delaware 11 Feb. 1972) – (originally 11:47)
- Tracks 1–5 from Epitaph (1997)
- Tracks 6–7 from Ladies of the Road (2002)
- Tracks 8–10 from Earthbound (1972)

=== Disc Three: In the Studio: 1972–1974 ===
1. "Larks' Tongues in Aspic Part I" (Abridged) (David Cross, Fripp, John Wetton, Bill Bruford, Jamie Muir) – 10:46
2. "Book of Saturday" (Fripp, Wetton, Richard Palmer-James) – 2:51
3. "Easy Money" (Fripp, Wetton, Palmer-James) – 8:01
4. "Larks' Tongues in Aspic Part II" (Fripp) – 7:11
5. "The Night Watch" (Fripp, Wetton, Palmer-James) – 4:41
6. "The Great Deceiver" (Wetton, Fripp, Palmer-James) – 4:02
7. "Fracture" (Fripp) – 11:12
8. "Starless" (Abridged) (Cross, Fripp, Wetton, Bruford, Palmer-James) – 4:36
9. "Red" (Fripp) – 6:15
10. "Fallen Angel" (Fripp, Wetton, Palmer-James) – 6:03
11. "One More Red Nightmare" (Fripp, Wetton) – 7:06
- Tracks 1–4 from Larks' Tongues in Aspic (1973)
- Tracks 5–7 from Starless and Bible Black (1974)
- Tracks 8–11 from Red (1974)

=== Disc Four: Live: 1973–1974 ===
1. "Asbury Park" (Cross, Fripp, Wetton, Bruford) (Live at Asbury Park, New Jersey, 28 June 1974) – 7:00
2. "The Talking Drum" (Cross, Fripp, Wetton, Bruford, Muir) (Live in Pittsburgh, Pennsylvania, 29 April 1974) – 5:45
3. "Larks' Tongues in Aspic Part II" (Fripp) (Live at Asbury Park, New Jersey, 28 June 1974) – 6:29
4. "Lament" (Fripp, Wetton, Palmer-James) (Live at Asbury Park, New Jersey, 28 June 1974) – 4:18
5. "We'll Let You Know" (Cross, Fripp, Wetton, Bruford) (Live at the Apollo in Glasgow, Scotland, 23 Oct. 1973) – 4:13
6. "Improv: Augsburg" (Cross, Fripp, Wetton, Bruford) (Live at Augsburg, Germany, 27 Mar. 1974) – 1:08
7. "Exiles" (Abridged) (Cross, Fripp, Wetton, Palmer-James) (Live at Asbury Park, New Jersey, 28 June 1974) – 5:52
8. "Easy Money" (Fripp, Wetton, Palmer-James) (Live edit of Asbury Park, New Jersey, 28 June 1974 & Palace Theater, Providence, Rhode Island, 30 June 1974) – 9:12
9. "Providence" (Cross, Fripp, Wetton, Bruford) (Live at the Palace Theater, Providence, Rhode Island 30 June 1974) – 10:01
10. "Starless and Bible Black" (Cross, Fripp, Wetton, Bruford) (Live at the Concertgebouw, Amsterdam, the Netherlands, 23 Nov. 1973) – 9:22
11. "21st Century Schizoid Man" (Fripp, McDonald, Lake, Giles, Sinfield) (Live in Providence, Rhode Island, 30 June 1974) – 8:16
12. "Trio" (Cross, Fripp, Wetton, Bruford) (Live at the Concertgebouw, Amsterdam, the Netherlands, 23 Nov. 1973) – 5:49
- NB: "Improv: Augsburg" (6) was concatenated at the end of "We'll Let You Know" (5) when Disc 4 was originally mastered (as an 11 track disc), though it is listed as a separate track in the collection's artwork.
- Track 5 from Starless and Bible Black
- Tracks 1, 3–4, 7–8, & 11 from USA (1975)
- Tracks 2 & 9 from The Great Deceiver (1992)
- Tracks 10 & 12 from The Night Watch (1997)
- Track 6 previously unreleased (2004)

== Lineup ==
- Robert Fripp – lead guitar, mellotron, and other devices on all tracks
- Ian McDonald – reeds, woodwinds, vibes, keyboards, mellotron, and vocals on disc 1, tracks 1–5 and disc 2, tracks 1–5
- Greg Lake – bass guitar and lead vocals on disc 1, tracks 1–5, 7, & 10 (original version) and disc 2, tracks 1–5
- Michael Giles – drums, percussion, and vocals on disc 1, tracks 1–5 & 7–10 and disc 2, tracks 1–5
- Peter Sinfield – lyrics, illumination, sound and vision on discs 1–2 & disc 4, track 11
- Peter Giles – bass guitar on disc 1, tracks 6–10
- Mel Collins – saxes, flute, and mellotron on disc 1, tracks 9 & 11–15 and disc 2, tracks 6–10
- Keith Tippett – piano on disc 1, tracks 7–15
- Gordon Haskell – bass guitar and lead vocals on disc 1, tracks 9 & 15
- Andy McCullough – drums on disc 1, track 15
- Nick Evans – trombone on disc 1, track 15
- Robin Miller – oboe and cor anglais on disc 1, tracks 11–15
- Marc Charig – cornet on disc 1, tracks 11–15
- Boz Burrell – bass guitar and lead vocals on disc 1, tracks 11–14 and disc 2, tracks 6–10
- Ian Wallace – drums on disc 1, tracks 11–14 and disc 2, tracks 6–10
- Harry Miller – string bass on disc 1, tracks 13–14
- David Cross – violin, viola, and mellotron on disc 3, tracks 1–7 and all of disc 4
- John Wetton – bass guitar, keyboards, lead vocals, and lyrics on discs 3–4
- Jamie Muir – percussion among other things on disc 3, tracks 1–4
- Bill Bruford – drums and percussion on discs 3–4
