= The Vicar (music producer) =

- The enigmatic Vicar

Background information
- Born: David Singleton; 21 March 1961 (age 65)
- Origin: England
- Genres: Art rock, art pop, ambient music, experimental music
- Occupations: Record producer, diarist, sleuth, aesthete
- Instruments: Audio editing software, guitar, bass guitar, piano, various
- Years active: 1981–present
- Labels: Discipline Global Mobile, Regina Records
- Website: thevicar.com

The Vicar is a persona and multimedia project created by record producer, songwriter and Internet entrepreneur David Singleton. Since 2001, the project has produced music (singles and albums), a public diary, fictional stories (in blog, videoblog, print paperback and graphic novel form) and several culture-jamming initiatives.

The Vicar's identity remained secret until 2013. That year, Singleton revealed himself on the occasion of the release of the first Vicar album Songbook#1. Singleton has summarised the project ethos as being "that music and music alone should take centre stage without the current obsession with personality and celebrity, nor with the damaging thieving hand of the mainstream music business."

== Concept ==
The core of the project is a semi-fictional/pseudonymous record producer referred to only as "The Vicar" (although over the course of the stories, his first name is occasionally revealed as "David"). In the Chronicles, novels and video blogs (presented as "surreal tales from the underbelly of the music industry") the Vicar is portrayed as a British eccentric who, in parallel to his production career, works as an industry troubleshooter and sleuth (aided and abetted by his rascal and long-suffering assistant Punk Sanderson). Although he is generally hired to solve the problems of senior industry executives the Vicar clearly has little respect for them, preferring to express a sardonic sympathy for exploited musicians and artists. On record, the Vicar's trademark sound is created by Singleton's own songwriting, production and arrangement talents, with guest appearances from some of the world's most outstanding musicians.

There is a clear overlap between the Vicar's fictional ethos and the actual campaigning ethos of Discipline Global Mobile (the record label run by Singleton in collaboration with Robert Fripp), and the character has been used as a method for protesting against corrupt practices within the recording business. Consequently, the Vicar has been described as being "a campaigner for artist rights and scourge of the evil empire of the record industry, both fictionally (in the stories) and in reality" while the stories have been described as "Sherlock Holmes meets Spinal Tap."

In an interview with the Salisbury Journal in 2013, Singleton commented on the multimedia nature of the project and its possible future expansion, explaining "in the past, a young writer would probably have just written a book – but nowadays people follow stories in all sorts of different ways, so the Vicar Chronicles have been released as physical books, ebooks, graphic novels, audiobooks and you can even see Punk Sanderson performing the whole book on YouTube... It's the first time to my knowledge that the same team have produced all the multimedia aspects of a project of this kind right from conception. We are also currently working on both a film script and a TV series."

== History ==
=== 1999–2003 (origins, "The Vicar's Diary", early production credits, speculations) ===
The concept for "The Vicar" emerged in 1999 out of a conversation between David Singleton and Robert Fripp (Singleton's creative and business partner in both the Discipline Global Mobile record label and the Ton Prob production team). When Singleton raised the question "why has no-one written whodunnits about the music industry?" Fripp replied, "because you haven't written them yet." This inspired Singleton to begin writing satirical mystery stories twisting true events into semi-fictional myths. Chief among the characters were the titular Vicar (an eccentric pseudonymous record producer and accidental sleuth) and his rascally assistant Punk Sanderson (ostensibly the narrator of the stories).

Both Singleton and Fripp disliked the cult of personality that was apparently inherent to rock music, and which was expressed in the behaviour and personas of performers, producers, executives and commentators alike. As a reaction to this, the Vicar persona was created as a virtual artist; a "man who isn't there."

From 8 January 2001, Singleton established a diary for the Vicar on the Discipline Global Mobile website, further developing the character. Diary notes generally represented Singleton's own working life and reflections, slightly fictionalised and with some identities and situations altered. Some aspects of the Vicar's personality were also drawn from Fripp's personal, philosophical and linguistic mannerisms.

From 2001 onwards, the Vicar was also given selected engineering and production credits on assorted Fripp or King Crimson recordings, beginning with the King Crimson live album Vrooom Vrooom. Regular diary readers began to enjoy speculating as to the Vicar's real identity. Suggested candidates included Fripp, Brian Eno, Bill Nelson, Peter Hammill, Anthony Phillips, Andy Partridge, Peter Gabriel, Sting, George Martin and Singleton himself. Various musicians wilfully added themselves to the "history" of the fictional Vicar, with Partridge's comment "since working with the Vicar, I can never feel the same about alpacas" or Nick Cave's "The Vicar? Half Buddha, half backstreet ****" being amongst the more memorable.

=== 2003–2005 (first Vicar novel, School Aid single) ===
On 23 September 2003, the first Vicar novel Chronicle The First – The Mysterious Case of Billy's G String began to appear online on the Vicar's diary as a series of successive posts. The novel was an adventure ostensibly written and narrated by Punk Sanderson in which Punk and the Vicar attempted to track down the person or people involved in sabotaging the career of pop star Billy G. The stories, combining comedy and music have been described by The Cult Den as "the Airplane! of the music world" and "Monty Python's life of Punk", with the magazine also advising readers to "open your mind and enter into the irreverence of it all." Aficionados can again see Singleton mythologising true events – in this case the 1990s financial debacle at Lloyd's of London (which had engulfed Fripp's former managers at E.G. Records and which had led to the establishment and ethical policies of Discipline Global Mobile). The Mysterious Case of Billy's G String was followed by a second Chronicle, The Absurd Nonsense of The Orange Eyebrow, detailing further misadventures for Punk and the Vicar at the MIDEM music conference in the south of France (another merging of myth and reality).

On 29 November 2005, the Vicar produced and released a fundraising community single called "Where's the Money, Mr Blair?", performed by School Aid (various people from Singleton's hometown of Broad Chalke, including Robert Fripp). The single was intended to raise renovation money for Broad Chalke Primary School (attended by Singleton's children) and to embarrass the British government over their apparent reluctance to provide proper funding for dilapidated schools. The single was released nationally on both CD and download. Singleton identified himself as the songwriter (and was interviewed and named as producer of the single in the British national press) but did not, at that point, formally admit to being the Vicar.

=== 2007–2012 (into multimedia – videoblogs, debut Vicar single, Facebook campaign, print novel) ===
In keeping with Singleton's ideas about "a single coherent multimedia future", the Vicar project now began to expand into other areas. On 30 April 2007 the first of a set of Vicar videoblogs was uploaded to YouTube, in which Punk Sanderson (appearing for the first time on camera) presented and narrated the first chapter of The Mysterious Case of Billy's G String. Further chapters followed at a regular rate, with thirty-six videoblogs shot in different locations telling the story of Chronicle the First (later included as a DVD extra with Songbook #1). The videoblogs were highly praised by Comic Spectrum which described them as "phenomenal" and advised "if you have any interest in music, comedy, or just plain great entertainment, click on the video and enjoy!"

On 18 November 2010, the debut Vicar single – "Count Your Blessings", sung by Andy Yorke of Unbelievable Truth – was released via iTunes.

On 6 September 2010, the Vicar project expanded to Facebook, setting up the "Free Punk Sanderson Campaign" and announcing that Punk Sanderson had been locked in there by the Vicar. The campaign backstory involved Punk being forced to stay within Facebook until he had "10,000 followers", at which point he would be set free and would be able to start broadcasting the second set of Vicar Chronicles videoblogs. A campaign video was released in which Punk attempted to force his way out of Facebook, followed by a series of teaser trailers for the new Chronicles. In the event, the second set of Chronicles videoblogs would not be broadcast for another two-and-a-half years.

In October 2012, The Mysterious Case of Billy's G String was compiled and released in two print versions, with authorship credited to Punk Sanderson. The first of these was a graphic novel released in October 2012 (and illustrated by Singleton's son Ben Singleton), which gained favourable reviews in the comics media. On 20 November 2012 The Mysterious Case of Billy's G String was published as a print novel.

=== 2013 (Fart For Your Rights, debut Vicar album, more videoblogs) ===
On 13 January 2013, the Vicar launched the "Fart For Your Rights" campaign, a culture-jamming event and mock dirty protest aimed at Universal Music Group, who were at the time selling King Crimson's music without proper legal agreements or due remuneration). Via a series of video-recorded protests outside the Kensington headquarters of UMG (involving displayed-and-dropped cue-cards in the manner of Dont Look Back, plus flatulence and other pranks) Punk drew attention to this side of UMG's business practices.

On 26 February 2013, Discipline Global Mobile released the debut album by The Vicar, Songbook #1. Featuring a full set of fourteen songs written entirely by Singleton, the album featured multiple guest musicians including King Crimson members (Fripp, Tony Levin, Jakko Jakszyk) and associates (Theo Travis, Cathy Stevens of Europa String Choir, Chas Dickie, Tony Geballe, Geoff Nichols and Alex Mundy). The songs were sung by Andy Yorke, David Scott (of Pearlfishers), Lewis Taylor, Tim Elsenburg (of Sweet Billy Pilgrim), Mutch Katsonga (of The Indie Soul Movement), Steve Porter and Paul Ibberson. The formal launch was followed by a launch event at the Dolby Studios in London on 30 April 2013.

The album received good reviews, many of them focussing on Singleton's detailed chamber-music arrangements. Ludovic Hunter-Tilney of the Financial Times hailed Songbook #1 as "a highly engaging exercise in psychedelic chamber pop" while in Classic Rock Hugh Fielder described it as "continuing where 'Eleanor Rigby' left off... once you're past the novelty aspect, the album becomes compelling." Mediaversal described Songbook #1 as "one of the most intriguing and innovative records of our time. A throwback to the psychedelic sixties with an air of Beatles, King Crimson, and an edge of Philip Glass, the album traverses many musical styles while staying the course on its unique sound.... an engaging listen that will surely keep you coming back for more." and drew attention to its "truly spectacular" surround sound mix. Altrockchick.com described the record as "the most paradoxical and amazing album I have heard in years... a brilliant, courageous, convention-defying contribution to the art" and praised its avoidance of a standard rhythm section approach (as well as labelling the album as a whole as having "everything to do with talent, everything to do with musicianship and everything to do with artistic integrity."

The album was particularly well received by the Italian music press. DFB Musica suggested that the album was "an exquisite collection of songs in the Scott Walker tradition" (as well as citing Colin Blunstone as another comparison), while and JAM magazine suggested that the Vicar "recalls the elegance of the Penguin Café Orchestra in a work that could not be more English. Sometimes melancholy and dreamy, sometimes fast and light, but always substantial. Delicious." Rockerilla awarded Songbook #1 "Album of the Month" and hailed its "definitive pop arrangements with the harmonic and melodic genius of George Martin and Phil Spector. An incredible acoustic light orchestra."

Meanwhile, once Punk Sanderson had obtained the requisite number of Facebook followers, the second set of Vicar videoblogs (in which he presented and narrated "The Absurd Nonsense of The Orange Eyebrow") began to be broadcast on 23 March 2013.

=== 2014–present (compiled novel, Drummer Jokes app, further initiatives) ===
In February 2014, both The Mysterious Case of Billy's G String and The Absurd Nonsense of The Orange Eyebrow were compiled into a single print novel, The Vicar Chronicles: Chronicle The First + 2nd.

On 20 August 2014, the Vicar website was revamped and relaunched. On 5 December 2014, the Vicar took on another aspect of multimedia with the release of a smartphone mobile app, The Vicar's Drummer Jokes and Celebrity Musician Guessing Game, developed by Flat Earth Studio LLC. It was later claimed that this was, in part, a humorous riposte to comments regarding the lack of drums (and drummers) within Songbook #1.

During this period, Singleton began work on the second Vicar album, Songbook #2, which will again feature guest singers. In 2015, the Vicar launched two further initiatives. "Be the Singer"/"V Factor" invited members of the public to record vocals to existing Vicar backing tracks, with the best performers to be invited to record material for Songbook #2. A simultaneous Instagram campaign, "#IamTheVicar", invited fans to photograph themselves obscuring their faces (a Vicar visual trademark) to appear on the cover of future Vicar releases. Both initiatives were intended to reinforce the underlying Vicar ethos of pure music made without a celebrity component.

== Works ==
=== Ebooks, print novels ===
- The Vicar Chronicles: Chronicle the First – The Mysterious Case of Billy’s Missing G-String (ebook, videoblog – text credited to Punk Sanderson)
- The Vicar Chronicles: Chronicle the Second – The Absurd Nonsense of The Orange Eyebrow (ebook – text credited to Punk Sanderson)
- The Vicar Chronicles: Chronicle the First & Second (paperback, text credited to Punk Sanderson) The Vicar Ltd., ISBN 9781909019003

=== Graphic novels ===
- The Mysterious Case of Billy’s Missing G-String (ebook, paperback – text credited to David Singleton and Punk Sanderson, art by Ben Singleton). The Vicar Ltd., ISBN 9781909019041

=== Discography ===
- "Count Your Blessings" single (Discipline Global Mobile, 2010)
- Songbook #1 (Discipline Global Mobile, DGMSP1, 2013)
- Songbook #2 (Discipline Global Mobile, forthcoming)

=== Additional production credits ===
- King Crimson: "Vrooom Vrooom" (2001) – production
- School Aid, "Where's the Money, Mr Blair?" single, 2005 – production
- King Crimson: 21st Century Guide to King Crimson, Vol. 2 (2005) – arrangement & production
- Robert Fripp: Love Cannot Bear (2005) – production
- Robert Fripp: Exposure (2006 reissue) – production consultant

=== Mobile apps ===
- The Vicar's Drummer Jokes & Celebrity Musician Guessing Game (Flat Earth Studio LLC, 2014)
