= The Beat Club, Bremen =

Live album by King Crimson
- Released: February 1999
- Recorded: 17 October 1972
- Studio: Beat Club TV set, Bremen, West Germany
- Genre: Progressive rock, experimental rock, free improvisation
- Length: 43:55
- Label: Discipline Global Mobile
- Producer: Robert Fripp and David Singleton

King Crimson Collector's Club chronology
| Live at Jacksonville (1998) | The Beat Club, Bremen (1999) | Live at Cap D'Agde (1999) |

The Beat Club, Bremen is a live album by the band King Crimson, released through the King Crimson Collector's Club in February 1999. It was recorded on the German TV show Beat Club, in Bremen, West Germany on 17 October 1972, and first aired on 25 November. The video of the performance is included in the deluxe Larks' Tongues in Aspic box set. It was only the second performance by this line-up of the band; the first, recorded four days earlier in Frankfurt, was released in 2002 as Live at the Zoom Club.

The album includes liner notes by the band's guitarist, Robert Fripp.

Professional ratings
Review scores
| Source | Rating |
|---|---|
| AllMusic | 3/5 stars |

== Track listing ==
1. "Improv: The Rich Tapestry of Life" (Cross, Fripp, Wetton, Bruford, Muir) – 29:49
2. "Exiles" (Cross, Fripp, Palmer-James) – 7:53
3. "Larks' Tongues in Aspic, Part One" (Cross, Fripp, Wetton, Bruford, Muir) – 6:53

== Personnel ==
King Crimson

- David Cross – violin, Mellotron, Hohner Pianet, flute
- Robert Fripp – electric guitar, Mellotron, Hohner Pianet
- John Wetton – bass guitar, fuzz, vocals
- Bill Bruford – drums, percussion
- Jamie Muir – percussion kit, whistle
- David Cross – violin, viola

Production personnel

- Alex R. Mundy – digital editing
- David Singleton – mastering
- Hugh O'Donnell – design
