= The Condensed 21st Century Guide to King Crimson =

Compilation album by King Crimson
- Released: 2006
- Recorded: 1969–2003
- Genre: Progressive rock
- Label: Discipline Global Mobile
- Producer: Robert Fripp

King Crimson chronology
The 21st Century Guide to King Crimson – Volume Two – 1981–2003 (2005)	The Condensed 21st Century Guide to King Crimson (2006)

The Condensed 21st Century Guide to King Crimson is a compilation by the English progressive rock band King Crimson, released in 2006. This 2-CD set is a distillation of two box sets, The 21st Century Guide to King Crimson – Volume One – 1969–1974 and The 21st Century Guide to King Crimson – Volume Two – 1981–2003, issued in 2004 and 2005 respectively.

== Track listing ==
=== Disc One: In the Studio: 1969–1974 ===
No.	Title	Writer(s)	Original album	Length
1.	"21st Century Schizoid Man" (including "Mirrors")	Robert Fripp, Ian McDonald, Greg Lake, Michael Giles, Peter Sinfield	In the Court of the Crimson King, 1969	7:23
2.	"Epitaph" (including "March for No Reason" and "Tomorrow and Tomorrow")	Fripp, McDonald, Lake, Giles, Sinfield	In the Court of the Crimson King	8:55
3.	"The Court of the Crimson King" (Abridged version; including "The Return of the Fire Witch" and "The Dance of the Puppets")	McDonald, Sinfield	In the Court of the Crimson King	7:16
4.	"Cat Food" (Single version)	Fripp, Sinfield, McDonald	In the Wake of Poseidon, 1970	2:47
5.	"Cadence and Cascade"	Fripp, Sinfield	In the Wake of Poseidon	4:37
6.	"Ladies of the Road"	Fripp, Sinfield	Islands, 1971	5:30
7.	"Sailor's Tale" (Abridged version)	Fripp	Islands	7:02
8.	"Larks' Tongues in Aspic (Part I)" (Abridged version)	David Cross, Fripp, John Wetton, Bill Bruford, Jamie Muir	Larks' Tongues in Aspic, 1973	6:41
9.	"Book of Saturday"	Fripp, Wetton, Richard Palmer-James	Larks' Tongues in Aspic	2:49
10.	"Fracture" (Abridged version)	Fripp	Starless and Bible Black, 1974	10:05
11.	"Starless" (Abridged version)	David Cross, Fripp, John Wetton, Bill Bruford, Richard Palmer-James	Red, 1974	4:37
12.	"Red"	Fripp	Red	6:15
13.	"Fallen Angel"	Fripp, Wetton, Palmer-James	Red	5:55

=== Disc Two: In the Studio: 1981–2003 ===
No.	Title	Writer(s)	Original album	Length
1.	"Elephant Talk"	Adrian Belew, Bruford, Fripp, Tony Levin	Discipline, 1981	4:44
2.	"Frame by Frame"	Belew, Bruford, Fripp, Levin	Discipline	5:08
3.	"Matte Kudasai"	Belew, Bruford, Fripp, Levin	Discipline	3:46
4.	"Discipline"	Belew, Bruford, Fripp, Levin	Discipline	5:02
5.	"Heartbeat"	Belew, Bruford, Fripp, Levin	Beat, 1982	3:54
6.	"Waiting Man"	Belew, Bruford, Fripp, Levin	Beat	4:26
7.	"Neurotica"	Belew, Bruford, Fripp, Levin	Beat	4:50
8.	"Three of a Perfect Pair"	Belew, Bruford, Fripp, Levin	Three of a Perfect Pair, 1984	4:10
9.	"Sleepless" (Abridged version)	Belew, Bruford, Fripp, Levin	Three of a Perfect Pair	4:36
10.	"VROOOM"	Belew, Bruford, Fripp, Trey Gunn, Levin, Pat Mastelotto	THRAK, 1995	4:37
11.	"Coda: Marine 475" (Abridged version)	Belew, Bruford, Fripp, Gunn, Levin, Mastelotto	THRAK	2:05
12.	"Dinosaur" (Single version)	Belew, Bruford, Fripp, Gunn, Levin, Mastelotto	THRAK	5:18
13.	"Sex Sleep Eat Drink Dream"	Belew, Bruford, Fripp, Gunn, Levin, Mastelotto	THRAK	4:48
14.	"The Power to Believe I: A Cappella"	Belew	The Power to Believe, 2003	0:43
15.	"Level Five"	Belew, Fripp, Gunn, Mastelotto	The Power to Believe	7:17
16.	"Eyes Wide Open"	Belew, Fripp, Gunn, Mastelotto	The Power to Believe	4:09
17.	"Happy with What You Have to Be Happy With" (EP version)	Belew, Fripp, Gunn, Mastelotto	Happy with What You Have to Be Happy With EP, 2002; later released on The Power to Believe	3:44
18.	"The Power to Believe III: Deception of the Thrush"	Belew, Fripp, Gunn, Mastelotto	The Power to Believe	4:10
19.	"The Power to Believe IV: Coda"	Fripp	The Power to Believe	2:21

== Personnel ==
- Robert Fripp
- Ian McDonald
- Greg Lake
- Michael Giles
- Peter Sinfield
- Peter Giles
- Mel Collins
- Keith Tippett
- Gordon Haskell
- Andrew McCulloch
- Robin Miller
- Marc Charig
- Nick Evans
- Jon Anderson
- Boz Burrell
- Ian Wallace
- David Cross
- John Wetton
- Bill Bruford
- Jamie Muir
- Adrian Belew
- Tony Levin
- Trey Gunn
- Pat Mastelotto

== Reception ==
Professional ratings
Review scores
Source	Rating
All About Jazz	4/5 stars
AllMusic	4/5 stars
Guitar Player	5/5 stars
Rolling Stone	4/5 stars

David Fricke wrote in Rolling Stone that this is a "deluxe primer of studio lightning and live thunder, compiled with the novice in mind ... Crimson's singular union of power, passion and intellect never flags despite the comings, goings and severe turns in direction ... made by entirely different lineups, both albums nevertheless epitomize Crimson's — and Fripp's — dedication to searing, transportive excellence ... the concert tapes affirm that with a blowtorch vengeance".

Author Greg Kot opined that "guitarist Robert Fripp's bitter liner notes get things off to a sour start, but the violence and invention in the music more than compensate". John Kelman from All About Jazz wondered "if Fripp can continue to reissue material ad infinitum ... but this new release is, indeed, a concise collection that almost perfectly represents Crimson's long and multifaceted career".

Barry Cleveland of Guitar Player said that the "CD box set provides the perfect introduction to one of rock's most influential bands ... the majority of the studio tracks are culled from the band's stunning 1969 debut ... the selections from the band's first seven studio albums are well-chosen, and the song sequencing makes for an enjoyable listen, but it's the live material that provides the greatest insight into what this group—or groups, as there are actually several different incarnations represented—was all about". He also noted the box set includes "a 24-page booklet containing a list of all the band's gigs, a diary-like running commentary by guitarist Robert Fripp, and a bevy of cool photos and other graphic memorabilia".
