= Live at the Marquee (King Crimson album) =

Live album by King Crimson
- Released: October 1998
- Recorded: Tracks 1–8: 6 July 1969; Track 9: 17 October 1969 (Believed)
- Venue: Marquee Club, London (Tracks 1–8) (Believed); Fairfield Halls, Croydon, England (Track 9)
- Genre: Progressive rock, jazz fusion
- Length: 71:25
- Label: Discipline Global Mobile
- Producer: Robert Fripp and David Singleton

King Crimson Collector's Club chronology
Live at the Marquee (1998)	Live at Jacksonville (1998)

Professional ratings
Review scores
Source	Rating
Allmusic	2.5/5 stars

Live at the Marquee is a live album by the band King Crimson derived from a low-quality audience bootleg recorded at London's Marquee Club in July 1969. It was the first release from the King Crimson Collector's Club, in October 1998, and includes liner notes by the band's guitarist, Robert Fripp.

The last track, recorded at Fairfield Halls, Croydon a few months later, is the only known recording of the song "Trees", which includes music that would later appear in both "A Man, A City"/"Pictures of a City" from In the Wake of Poseidon and "Wishbone Ascension" from McDonald and Giles. This track is sourced from an even lower quality bootleg than the Marquee recording.

== Track listing ==
1. "21st Century Schizoid Man" (Fripp, McDonald, Lake, Giles, Sinfield) – 6:22
2. "Drop In" (Fripp, McDonald, Lake, Giles) – 5:42
3. "I Talk to the Wind" (McDonald, Sinfield) – 5:18
4. "Epitaph" (Fripp, McDonald, Lake, Giles, Sinfield) – 3:20
5. "Mantra" [not listed] (Fripp, McDonald, Lake, Giles) – 7:33
6. "Travel Weary Capricorn" (Fripp, McDonald, Lake, Giles, Sinfield) – 3:33
7. "Improv" (Fripp, McDonald, Lake, Giles) – 12:29
  including "Nola" (Felix Arndt) and "Étude No 7" (Matteo Carcassi)
8. "Mars" (Gustav Holst, arr. by Fripp, McDonald, Lake, Giles) – 8:30
9. "Trees" (Fripp, McDonald, Lake, Giles, Sinfield) – 18:44

== Personnel ==
King Crimson

- Robert Fripp – electric guitar
- Ian McDonald – alto saxophone, flute, Mellotron, vocals
- Greg Lake – bass guitar, lead vocals
- Michael Giles – drums, percussion, vocals
- Peter Sinfield – illumination, live sound mixing

Production personnel

- Alex R. Mundy – digital editing
- David Singleton – mastering
- Hugh O'Donnell – design
