= Epitaph (King Crimson album) =

Live album by King Crimson
- Released: March 1997
- Recorded: 1969; actual dates vary with each disc
- Genre: Progressive rock
- Length: 234:05
- Label: Discipline Global Mobile
- Producers: Robert Fripp and David Singleton

King Crimson chronology
| Thrakattak (1996) | Epitaph (1997) | The Night Watch (1998) |

Professional ratings
Review scores
| Source | Rating |
|---|---|
| AllMusic | 4/5 stars |
| Rolling Stone | 4/5 stars |

Epitaph is a live 4-CD set of concert performances and radio sessions from 1969 by the English progressive rock band King Crimson, released in 1997. Volumes 1 and 2 (Discs 1 and 2) were available in retail shops, and the set included a flyer with instructions on how to obtain Volumes 3 and 4 (Discs 3 and 4) via mail-order. In 2006, volumes 3 and 4 were released independently as a 2-disc set via DGM.

== Track listing ==
All tracks written by Robert Fripp, Ian McDonald, Greg Lake, Michael Giles and Peter Sinfield, unless otherwise indicated.

Disc one
| No. | Title | Recording date and venue | Length |
|---|---|---|---|
| 1. | "21st Century Schizoid Man" | 6 May 1969 at Maida Vale Studios for BBC Radio | 7:06 |
| 2. | "The Court of the Crimson King" (McDonald, Sinfield) | 6 May 1969 at Maida Vale Studios for BBC Radio | 6:27 |
| 3. | "Get Thy Bearings" (Donovan, arr. by Fripp, McDonald, Lake, Giles) | 19 August 1969 at Maida Vale Studios for BBC Radio | 5:59 |
| 4. | "Epitaph" (Includes introduction to track 5 at the end) | 19 August 1969 at Maida Vale Studios for BBC Radio | 7:08 |
| 5. | "A Man, a City" | 21 November 1969 at the Fillmore East | 11:41 |
| 6. | "Epitaph" | 21 November 1969 at the Fillmore East | 7:42 |
| 7. | "21st Century Schizoid Man" | 21 November 1969 at the Fillmore East | 7:16 |
| 8. | "Mantra" | 13 December 1969 at the Fillmore West | 3:47 |
| 9. | "Travel Weary Capricorn" | 13 December 1969 at the Fillmore West | 3:15 |
| 10. | "Improv - Travel Bleary Capricorn" | 13 December 1969 at the Fillmore West | 2:23 |
| 11. | "Mars" (Gustav Holst, arr. Fripp, McDonald, Lake, Giles) | 13 December 1969 at the Fillmore West | 8:53 |

Disc two (All tracks recorded on 14 December 1969 at the Fillmore West, San Francisco)
| No. | Title | Length |
|---|---|---|
| 1. | "The Court of the Crimson King" (McDonald, Sinfield) | 7:13 |
| 2. | "Drop In" (Fripp, McDonald, Lake, Giles) | 5:14 |
| 3. | "A Man, a City" | 11:19 |
| 4. | "Epitaph" | 7:31 |
| 5. | "21st Century Schizoid Man" | 7:37 |
| 6. | "Mars" (Holst) | 9:42 |

Disc three (All tracks recorded on 9 August 1969 at the ninth National Jazz and Blues Festival, Plumpton)
| No. | Title | Length |
|---|---|---|
| 1. | "21st Century Schizoid Man" | 7:14 |
| 2. | "Get Thy Bearings" (Donovan, arr. Fripp, McDonald, Lake, Giles) | 10:32 |
| 3. | "The Court of the Crimson King" (McDonald, Sinfield) | 6:43 |
| 4. | "Mantra" | 8:46 |
| 5. | "Travel Weary Capricorn" | 3:57 |
| 6. | "Improv" (including "By the Sleeping Lagoon" (Eric Coates)) | 8:54 |
| 7. | "Mars" (Holst) | 7:23 |

Disc four (All tracks recorded on 6 September 1969 at the Chesterfield Jazz Club)
| No. | Title | Length |
|---|---|---|
| 1. | "21st Century Schizoid Man" | 7:57 |
| 2. | "Drop In" (Fripp, McDonald, Lake, Giles) | 6:20 |
| 3. | "Epitaph" | 7:22 |
| 4. | "Get Thy Bearings" (Donovan, arr. Fripp, McDonald, Lake, Giles) | 18:10 |
| 5. | "Mantra" | 5:29 |
| 6. | "Travel Weary Capricorn" | 4:54 |
| 7. | "Improv" | 4:34 |
| 8. | "Mars" (Holst, arr. by Fripp, McDonald, Lake, Giles) | 5:37 |

== Personnel ==
King Crimson

- Robert Fripp – electric guitar
- Ian McDonald – woodwinds, Mellotron, backing vocals
- Greg Lake – bass guitar, lead vocals
- Michael Giles – drums, percussion, backing vocals, lead vocals on "Travel Weary Capricorn"
- Peter Sinfield – lyrics, live sound mixing, stage lighting

Additional personnel

- David Enthoven and John Gaydon – management
- Dik Fraser and Richard Vickers – road crew

Production personnel

- Robert Fripp and David Singleton – editing and mastering
- P.J. Crook – cover artwork
- Bill Smith Studio – design

== Charts ==
| Chart (1997) | Peak position |
|---|---|
| Japanese Albums (Oricon) | 42 |
