= The Power to Believe =

2003 studio album by King Crimson

Studio album by King Crimson
- Released: 24 February 2003 (UK); 4 March 2003 (US)
- Recorded: 2002
- Studios: The Tracking Room, Nashville; StudioBelew, Nashville; Pat's Garage, Austin; St. Peter's Church, Newlyn
- Genres: Progressive metal; industrial metal; progressive rock
- Length: 51:11
- Label: Sanctuary
- Producers: King Crimson; Machine

King Crimson chronology
Happy with What You Have to Be Happy With (2002)	The Power to Believe (2003)	EleKtrik: Live in Japan (2003)

King Crimson studio chronology
The ConstruKction of Light (2000)	The Power to Believe (2003)

The Power to Believe is the thirteenth and final studio album by English progressive rock band King Crimson. It was released on 24 February 2003 in the United Kingdom and on 4 March 2003 in the United States through Sanctuary Records and met with generally favourable reviews, with several critics appreciating its heightened aggression. The Power to Believe was preceded by the EP Happy with What You Have to Be Happy With (2002), which features alternate and otherwise unreleased tracks.

== Background ==
After a tour opening for Tool in 2001, King Crimson refined and focused their four-piece structure for their second album in that configuration. The release of The Power to Believe was preceded by Level Five (2001) and Happy with What You Have to Be Happy With (2002), two EPs that functioned as work-in-progress reveals for the album, which Fripp described as "the culmination of three years of Crimsonising". While Level Five was a live release featuring two songs that would appear on the full album, Happy With What You Have to Be Happy With was a limited-edition studio release that, much like 1994's VROOOM, featured early studio versions of the upcoming album's tracks.

== Content and composition ==
"Elektrik"
"Elektrik" showcases the album's increased weight and aggression.

Originally titled Nuovo Metal, The Power to Believe continued the aggressive and occasionally industrial metal-leaning experimentation of King Crimson's previous album, 2000's The Construkction of Light, with several critics appreciating its increased heaviness. Like that previous album, The Power to Believe was recorded with King Crimson as a four-piece.

The album derives its title from "The Power to Believe", a four-part suite of songs that runs throughout the album. The phrase originally appeared in the song "All Her Love Is Mine" from Adrian Belew's 1996 solo album Op Zop Too Wah. The album's second track, "Level Five", acts as the fifth and final entry in the group's long-running "Larks' Tongues in Aspic" suite. Lindsay Planer of AllMusic wrote that the track "could easily be mistaken for the likes of Tool, Ministry, Nine Inch Nails, or KMFDM."

"Facts of Life: Intro" features a sample of "The Outer Darkness II: Perimeter I", from Fripp's 1998 album The Gates of Paradise.

== Critical reception ==
Professional ratings
Aggregate scores
Source	Rating
Metacritic	72/100
Review scores
Source	Rating
AllMusic	4/5 stars
BBC	Positive
Mojo	4/5 stars
Pitchfork	6.3/10
Rolling Stone	4/5 stars
Stylus Magazine	6.5/10

The Power to Believe was met with mostly positive reviews. The album received an average score of 72/100 from 8 reviews on Metacritic, indicating "generally favorable reviews". AllMusic's Lindsay Planer praised the album's aggression and "sonic belligerence", writing, "If the bandmembers' constant tone probing is an active search to find the unwitting consciousness of a decidedly younger, rowdier, and more demanding audience, their collective mission is most assuredly accomplished on The Power to Believe -- even more so than the tripped-out psychedelic prog rock behemoth from whence [sic] they initially emerged." David Fricke of Rolling Stone appreciated the album's contrast of heavy, frightening periods against peaceful moments, concluding with, "In the face of war, King Crimson make hopeful thunder." In their 2003 review, Mojo wrote, "This is a more consistent set, and, hopefully, a revelation for a few young metal heads." Chris Jones of the BBC called the album "simply stunning".

Writing for Pitchfork, Dominique Leone said, "I can admit to feeling some of that old Crim magic a few times during [the album], but would be kidding myself if I thought it was as potent a spell as their adventures of yore." Stylus Magazine's Ed Howard called The Power to Believe King Crimson's best release since 1981's Discipline but thought it did not live up to their earlier work.

== Re-issue ==
In 2019, King Crimson announced that The Power to Believe would be the fifteenth and final phase of their "40th Anniversary" release schedule. An enhanced and expanded master of the album was released in hi-res stereo audio as well as lossless 5.1 Surround Sound.

== Track listing ==
All music written by Adrian Belew, Robert Fripp, Trey Gunn and Pat Mastelotto; all lyrics written by Adrian Belew.

No.	Title	Length
1.	"The Power to Believe I: A Cappella"	0:44
2.	"Level Five" (instrumental)	7:17
3.	"Eyes Wide Open"	4:08
4.	"Elektrik" (instrumental)	7:59
5.	"Facts of Life: Intro" (instrumental)	1:38
6.	"Facts of Life"	5:05
7.	"The Power to Believe II"	7:43
8.	"Dangerous Curves" (instrumental)	6:42
9.	"Happy with What You Have to Be Happy With"	3:17
10.	"The Power to Believe III"	4:09
11.	"The Power to Believe IV: Coda"	2:29
Total length:		51:11

== Personnel ==
King Crimson

- Adrian Belew – electric guitar, vocals
- Robert Fripp – electric guitar
- Trey Gunn – fretted and fretless Warr Guitar, bass guitar
- Pat Mastelotto – acoustic and electronic drums and percussion

Additional personnel

- Ken Latchney – haiku voice recording
- Tim Faulkner – voice source (track 4)
- Machine – production, programming, engineering, mixing
- Jeff Juliano – additional engineering
- Simon Heyworth – mastering
- David Singleton – mastering, management
- P. J. Crook – artwork
- Hugh O'Donnell – sleeve design

== Charts ==
Chart performance for The Power to Believe
Chart (2003)	Peak position
German Albums (Offizielle Top 100)	65
Finnish Albums (Suomen virallinen lista)	25
French Albums (SNEP)	128
Italian Albums (FIMI)	45
Japanese Albums (Oricon)	40
UK Albums (Official Charts)	162
UK Independent Albums (Official Charts)	21
UK Rock & Metal Albums (Official Charts)	23
US Billboard 200	150
