= Thrakattak =

Live album by King Crimson
- Released: 21 May 1996
- Recorded: 1995
- Venue: Various
- Genres: Progressive rock, experimental rock, instrumental rock, free improvisation
- Length: 57:14
- Label: Discipline Global Mobile
- Producers: Robert Fripp and David Singleton

King Crimson chronology
| B'Boom: Live in Argentina (1995) | Thrakattak (1996) | Epitaph (1997) |

Professional ratings
Review scores
| Source | Rating |
|---|---|
| Allmusic | 3.5/5 stars |
| Rolling Stone | (favorable) |

Thrakattak (written with consonants capitalized as THRaKaTTaK on the album cover) is a live album by the English progressive rock band King Crimson released on 21 May 1996 and recorded during their 1995 THRAK tour of the United States and Japan.

Each night the band would perform a collective improvisation in the middle of the instrumental piece "THRAK". This album presents an hour-long version of the piece, created by editing many of these improvisations together, bookended by the "THRAK" theme.

Track 2, "Fearless and Highly Thrakked", also appears on the 1999 live album On Broadway. An alternative version appears on Disc 1 of the 2001 live compilation album Vrooom Vrooom as "Biker Babes of the Rio Grande".

== Reception ==
Lindsay Planer of AllMusic gave the album three and a half stars and noted "the songs demonstrate their uncanny abilities as performers who are simultaneously active listeners" and concluded "[s]ounds such as those contained on Thrakattak are without question an acquired taste and challenging at times to listen to. However for many King Crimson enthusiasts, that is precisely the appeal." David Fricke of Rolling Stone called it "an hour of stage tapes from late '95 with founding guitarist Robert Fripp and the rest of the band in flat-out, free-improvisation mode – is a visceral treat, a document of amazing technical might and telepathic precision."

== Track listing ==
All music by Belew, Fripp, Gunn, Levin, Bruford and Mastelotto

1. "Thrak" – 2:20
  Recorded at:
  Longacre Theatre, Manhattan, New York City, New York, United States, 21 November 1995
2. "Fearless and Highly Thrakked" – 6:35
  Recorded at:
  Longacre Theatre, Manhattan, New York City, New York, United States, 20 November 1995
  Longacre Theatre, Manhattan, New York City, New York, United States, 21 November 1995
3. "Mother Hold the Candle Steady While I Shave the Chicken's Lip" – 11:18
  Recorded at:
  Nagoya Shimin Kaikan, Nagoya, Aichi, Japan, 8 October 1995
  Hitomi Kinen Kōdō, Tokyo, Japan, 10 October 1995
  Omiya Sonic Hall, Saitama, Saitama, Japan, 12 October 1995
4. "Thrakattak (Part I)" – 3:42
  Recorded at:
  Koseinenkin Kaikan Hall, Tokyo, Japan, 2 October 1995
  Koseinenkin Kaikan Hall, Tokyo, Japan, 3 October 1995
  Festival Hall, Kita-ku, Osaka, Japan, 9 October 1995
5. "The Slaughter of the Innocents" – 8:03
  Recorded at:
  Koseinenkin Kaikan Hall, Tokyo, Japan, 14 October 1995
  Paramount Theater, Springfield, Massachusetts, United States, 17 November 1995
  Mahaffey Theater, St. Petersburg, Florida, United States, 8 November 1995
  Roxy Theatre, Atlanta, Georgia, United States, 11 November 1995
6. "This Night Wounds Time" – 11:16
  Recorded at:
  Tupperware Convention Center, Kissimmee, Florida, United States, 9 November 1995
  Longacre Theatre, Manhattan, New York City, New York, United States, 22 November 1995
  Longacre Theatre, Manhattan, New York City, New York, United States, 24 November 1995
  Longacre Theatre, Manhattan, New York City, New York, United States, 25 November 1995
  Palace Theatre, Columbus, Ohio, United States, 27 November 1995
  Rosemont Theatre, Rosemont, Illinois, United States, 29 November 1995
7. "Thrakattak (Part II)" – 11:08
  Recorded at:
  Auditorium Theatre, Rochester, New York, United States, 16 November 1995
  Longacre Theatre, Manhattan, New York City, New York, United States, 22 November 1995
  Longacre Theatre, Manhattan, New York City, New York, United States, 25 November 1995
  Rosemont Theatre, Rosemont, Cook County, Chicago, Illinois, United States, 29 November 1995
8. "Thrak (Reprise)" – 2:52
  Recorded at:
  Nakano Sun Plaza, Nakano, Tokyo, Japan, 5 October 1995
  Longacre Theatre, Manhattan, New York City, New York, United States, 20 November 1995

== Personnel ==
King Crimson

- Adrian Belew – electric guitar
- Robert Fripp – electric guitar
- Trey Gunn – Warr Guitar
- Tony Levin – electric upright bass
- Bill Bruford – drums, percussion
- Pat Mastelotto – drums, percussion

Technical personnel

- George Glossop – live sound engineer
- Mike Downs - live monitor engineer
- Noah Evens – ADAT recording
- David Singleton – arrangement, editing and mastering
- Steve Jennings – cover photography
- Tony Levin – burning house and guitar photography
- Bill Smith Studio – design

== Charts ==
| Chart (1996) | Peak position |
|---|---|
| Japanese Albums (Oricon) | 87 |
