= The Gates of Paradise (album) =

Studio album by Robert Fripp
- Released: 28 April 1998
- Recorded: 9 June 1994 – 9 March 1996
- Genres: Ambient; soundscape
- Length: 59:32
- Label: Discipline Global Mobile
- Producers: David Singleton; Robert Fripp

Robert Fripp chronology
| Pie Jesu (1997) | The Gates of Paradise (1998) |

Professional ratings
Review scores
| Source | Rating |
|---|---|
| AllMusic | 4/5 stars |

The Gates of Paradise is the fourth solo album by British guitarist and composer Robert Fripp. This album continues Fripp's exploration of more ambient and experimental textures in his music, which he referred to as “soundscapes”. The album received generally positive reviews from both professional reviewers and fans. The album consists of two tracks, each broken into two parts. "The Outer Darkness" runs for nearly 34 minutes, and "Gates of Paradise" runs for over 24 minutes.

== Track listing ==
1. "The Outer Darkness: I. The Outer Darkness / II. Perimeter I / III. Perimeter II / IV. Wailing I / V. Perimeter III / VI. Wailing II / VII. Perimeter IV / VIII. Wailing III / IX. Black Light / X. A Wailing and Gnashing of Teeth" – 23:38
2. "The Gates of Paradise: I. Abandonment to Divine Providence / II. Pie Jesu" – 13:56
3. "The Outer Darkness: XI. In Fear and Trembling of the Lord" – 10:17
4. "The Gates of Paradise: III. Sometimes God Hides / IV. Acceptance" – 11:41

== Personnel ==
- Robert Fripp – electric guitar and soundscapes
- David Singleton – digital compositor
- John Miller – cover art
- David Coppenhall & Maggi Smith at Split – design
