= Vrooom Vrooom =

Live album by King Crimson
- Released: 13 November 2001
- Recorded: 2-4 August 1996 (Disc 1); 20-25 November 1995 (Disc 2)
- Venue: Teatro Metropólitan, Mexico City, Mexico (Disc 1); Longacre Theatre, New York City, United States (Disc 2)
- Genre: Progressive rock
- Length: 128:37
- Label: Discipline Global Mobile
- Producer: David Singleton and Robert Fripp

King Crimson chronology
Heavy ConstruKction (2000)	Vrooom Vrooom (2001)	Ladies of the Road (2002)

Professional ratings
Review scores
Source	Rating
AllMusic	4.5/5 stars

Vrooom Vrooom is a live two CD set by the English progressive rock band King Crimson, recorded in 1995 & 1996 and released in 2001. It features the six member “double trio” lineup of the band, with guitarists Robert Fripp and Adrian Belew, bassists Tony Levin and Trey Gunn, and drummers Bill Bruford and Pat Mastelotto.

This album was intended as a wider commercial release of two previous releases which had been made available on more limited media in 1999. Disc one was taken predominantly from the same recordings as the 1999 live album Live in Mexico City (originally made available exclusively as a Windows Media Audio download). The eleventh track on the disc, "Biker Babes of the Rio Grande", is an alternative version of the track "Fearless and Highly Thrakked", previously featured on Thrakattak (1996) and On Broadway (1999). Disc two was derived mostly from the same recordings as On Broadway, originally released as the July 1999 release in the then subscriber-only King Crimson Collectors' Club.

== Track listing ==
=== Disc one ===
1. "Vrooom Vrooom" (Belew, Fripp, Gunn, Levin, Bruford, Mastelotto) – 5:01
2. "Coda: Marine 475" (Belew, Fripp, Gunn, Levin, Bruford, Mastelotto) – 2:44
3. "Dinosaur" (Belew, Fripp, Gunn, Levin, Bruford, Mastelotto) – 5:05
4. "B'Boom" (Belew, Fripp, Gunn, Levin, Bruford, Mastelotto) – 4:51
5. "THRAK" (Belew, Fripp, Gunn, Levin, Bruford, Mastelotto) – 6:39
6. "The Talking Drum" (Cross, Fripp, Wetton, Bill Bruford, Muir) – 4:03
7. "Larks' Tongues in Aspic (Part II)" (Fripp) – 6:13
8. "Neurotica" (Belew, Fripp, Levin, Bruford) – 3:40
9. "Prism" (Favre) – 4:24
10. "Red" (Fripp) – 7:03
11. "Improv: Biker Babes of the Rio Grande" (Belew, Fripp, Gunn, Levin, Bruford, Mastelotto) – 2:27
12. "21st Century Schizoid Man" (Fripp, McDonald, Lake, Giles, Sinfield) – 7:37
- All tracks except 11 recorded 2–4 August 1996 at the Teatro Metropólitan, Mexico City, Mexico
- Track 11 recorded 22 November 1995 at the Longacre Theater, New York, NY, USA

=== Disc two ===
1. "Conundrum" (Belew, Fripp, Gunn, Levin, Bruford, Mastelotto) – 1:57
2. "Thela Hun Ginjeet" (Belew, Fripp, Levin, Bruford) – 6:44
3. "Frame by Frame" (Belew, Fripp, Levin, Bruford) – 5:12
4. "People" (Belew, Fripp, Gunn, Levin, Bruford, Mastelotto) – 6:12
5. "One Time" (Belew, Fripp, Gunn, Levin, Bruford, Mastelotto) – 5:52
6. "Sex Sleep Eat Drink Dream" (Belew, Fripp, Gunn, Levin, Bruford, Mastelotto) – 4:55
7. "Indiscipline" (Belew, Fripp, Levin, Bruford) – 7:16
8. "Improv: Two Sticks" (Gunn, Levin) – 1:50
9. "Elephant Talk" (Belew, Fripp, Levin, Bruford) – 5:14
10. "Three of a Perfect Pair" (Belew, Fripp, Levin, Bruford) – 4:16
11. "B'Boom" (Belew, Fripp, Gunn, Levin, Bruford, Mastelotto) – 3:47
12. "THRAK" (Belew, Fripp, Gunn, Levin, Bruford, Mastelotto) – 6:43
13. "Free as a Bird" (Lennon) – 3:03
14. "Walking on Air" (Belew, Fripp, Gunn, Levin, Bruford, Mastelotto) – 5:35
- All tracks except 14 recorded 20–22, 24–25 November 1995 at the Longacre Theater, New York, NY, USA
- Track 14 recorded 30 June 1995 at the Wiltern Theatre, Los Angeles, CA, USA

== Personnel ==
King Crimson

- Adrian Belew – guitar, vocals
- Robert Fripp – guitar
- Trey Gunn – Warr guitar
- Tony Levin – bass guitar, electric upright bass, Chapman stick, backing vocals
- Bill Bruford – drums, percussion
- Pat Mastelotto – drums, percussion

Production personnel

- Ronan Chris Murphy and Robert Fripp – mixing (Disc 1)
- Adrian Belew and Ken Latchney – mixing (Disc 2)
- David Singleton and Robert Fripp – mastering (DGM)
- Alex R. Murphy – assistant engineer (DGM)
- P.J. Crook – cover artwork
- Steve Jennings, Robert Leslie and Tony Levin – photography
- Hugh O'Donnell – design
