= David Singleton =

- Born: 21 March 1961 (age 65)
- Genres: Art rock, ambient music, experimental music
- Occupations: Record producer, arranger, composer, musician, songwriter
- Instruments: Audio editing software, guitar, bass guitar, piano
- Years active: 1981–present
- Label: Discipline Global Mobile
- Website: thevicar.com

David Singleton (born 1961) is an English record producer, audio engineer, record label director, musician, songwriter, author and Internet entrepreneur. He is best known as the production and business partner of Robert Fripp of King Crimson.

Singleton is the co-owner/director (with Fripp) of the Discipline Global Mobile record label, half of the Ton Prob production team (again with Fripp) and the developer of the BootlegTV live concert streaming setup. Singleton has co-produced and/or engineered almost every Robert Fripp release (including King Crimson albums, EPs and archive releases) since 1992, and has also worked on releases by Bill Nelson, Bill Bruford, Europa String Choir and many others.

In addition to his production and label administration work, Singleton has pursued an intermittent career as musician and songwriter. He released a solo single in the early 1980s and was part of the 1990s art-pop band Camilla's Little Secret. His work as producer has extended beyond executive and technical roles to embrace creative musical collaborations, generally using his skills as an audio technician and an aficionado of found sound. Singleton has collaborated with King Crimson (as re-arranger/re-composer of band material) on several albums released during the 1990s and 2000s.

Singleton currently releases his own material under the alias of The Vicar – a multimedia project persona that has produced a story blog and videoblogs, printed fiction, graphic novels, and song albums.

== Early career and production work, The Mobile (1981–1990) ==
David Singleton was educated at St John's College, Cambridge, where he studied philosophy and occasionally wrote and performed his own songs. His first release as a musician and songwriter was the single "If You Can Sing in Tune/Lazy Bugger", recorded and released in 1981 while he was still an undergraduate.

Following graduation, Singleton worked as a teacher. In early 1984, while living in the Dorset village of Lytchett Matravers, he opted to change career and work as an audio engineer and record producer, setting up a 16-track studio called The Mobile inside a former mobile dental clinic caravan. While the Mobile was initially based in Lytchett Matravers, Singleton later re-situated it in the Courtyard Crafts Centre in nearby Lytchett Minster.

Singleton's aim was to provide a potentially mobile recording service at a much lower cost than a standard studio, and to use this to encourage people and organisations with lower budgets to make recordings. To this end, he persuaded various recording equipment companies to sell him second-hand ex-demonstration equipment at a greatly reduced price: the proviso which he used to seal the deal was that the equipment would be used to record work by young people who might retain their interest in recording and thus become company customers in the future. In keeping with this initial pledge, early work with the Mobile included a recording of Britten's Noye's Fludde made at the Blandford Music Festival (released as an in-house recording) and assorted work with schools. Singleton also contributed outreach work at Youth Training Schemes encouraging young trainees towards their own careers in music production.

In 1987, Singleton wrote a set of his own songs with the intent of recording them with a large communal group of Dorset musicians. Although the project was never completed, some of the songs written at this time were revisited several decades later for the Vicar project.

== Discipline Global Mobile and Ton Prob (1991–present) ==
In October 1990, Singleton applied to work with art rock guitarist Robert Fripp (best known for his work as the leader of King Crimson and as a collaborator with David Bowie) who needed a live sound engineer at short notice in the middle of a tour with his Guitar Craft ensemble League of Crafty Guitarists. The two men quickly established a rapport, and Fripp subsequently hired Singleton to work on the 1991 King Crimson compilation Frame by Frame: The Essential King Crimson, to engineer, master and mix Kneeling at the Shrine (the lone 1991 album by the Fripp/Toyah band Sunday All Over the World) and to mix Show of Hands (the second album by The League of Crafty Guitarists). At the time, Fripp (who was living in the town of Wimborne Minster) was a near-neighbour of Singleton's and the duo soon joined forces as a permanent and equal partnership of complementary, overlapping skills and ideas. Consequently, Singleton has co-produced and/or engineered almost every subsequent Robert Fripp release, including the vast majority of King Crimson albums, EPs and archive releases since the start of the 1990s.

In 1992 Fripp and Singleton founded both the Ton Prob production partnership and the record label Discipline Global Mobile (DGM), both of which have continued to the present day. DGM was explicitly set up as "a model of ethical business in an industry founded on exploitation, oiled by deceit, riven with theft and fueled by greed". The label was structured so as to operate within the marketplace without being dictated by commercialism, and to encourage development within three fields (within music, within a developing and sought-out audience, and within the personal lives of those working as part of the label).

During this period Singleton worked with assorted DGM-signed artists (Trey Gunn, California Guitar Trio, Gitbox, Tony Geballe, Jacob Heringman, Ten Seconds) as well as The Orb (via the Fripp/Orb/Thomas Fehlmann collaboration FFWD) and Bill Nelson (musician), and worked on archive recordings by King Crimson, The League of Gentlemen and The League of Crafty Guitarists. Post-1998, his production clients have included past and present King Crimson frontmen John Wetton and Jakko Jakszyk and classic American songwriter Melanie.

In 1996, Singleton was responsible for digitally collating, editing, re-arranging and partly re-composing a set of King Crimson live improvisations from their 1995 tour. This was released as the live album Thrakattak and was Singleton's first collaboration with King Crimson as a co-writer and performer (albeit at the post-production stage). He would follow this up in 2003 with a similar task on The Power to Believe, reworking a Robert Fripp soundscape to produce the album's final track.

== Camilla's Little Secret (1992–1994) ==
In 1992 (at around the same time that he and Fripp were first founding DGM) Singleton joined keyboard player and arranger Toby Campling-Richard's band Camilla's Little Secret as bass guitarist/pianist/co-producer. As well as Campling-Richards and Singleton, the band also featured Sunday All Over the World's drummer Paul Beavis and two singers (Martin Rawle and Georgia Lewis) with Fripp making occasional guest appearance on guitar under the pseudonym of Bobby Wilcox.

The first release by Camilla's Little Secret was the single "BEA" later in 1992. In March 1993 the band recorded and released a second single, a double-A-side on vinyl called "Tantalising Eyes", marketed with the tagline "Are you bored hearing the same guitar solo every time? There is now a record that can change every time you play it! Put it on your turntable and be amazed!" This effect was achieved by cutting two parallel concentric grooves on each side of the disc instead of the usual one, and pressing a different version of the song into each one – the result being that the single actually offered four detailed variations on the song, with a gramophone stylus likely to fit into and trace a different groove each time that the disc was played.

Camilla's Little Secret went on to record an album – 1994's The Steps – before breaking up. "Tantalising Eyes" was re-released as a vinyl single in April 2015, as part of Record Store Day 2015.

== BootlegTV (1999–2001) ==
In 1999, inspired in part by his ongoing work on reclaiming and remastering King Crimson's unreleased live recordings, Singleton (together with graphic designer Steve Ball) developed the idea of BootlegTV – an online music distribution service and video sharing website dedicated to archived live concerts. BootlegTV was originally envisaged as "(a way) to use the web to enable distribution of live music in a way that would undermine the illegal bootleg market while giving musicians an opportunity to manage and monetize a previously difficult-to-distribute asset that (was) gathering dust in their closet: their live concert recordings." Singleton also aimed to develop it as an appropriate business & distribution structure attuned to the original aims of DGM but incorporating new technology-driven changes.

Based in Seattle, the project was launched in November 1999 with the taglines "the beginning of the end of bootlegs" and "the evolution will be televised." An advertisement in Billboard magazine explained the idea in greater depth – "Your fans love a great bootleg. We'll make sure you get both the love and the money. At BootlegTV, we're about protecting the intellectual property of creative artists and rightful copyright holders. We're also about uniting new media, art and commerce in a way that makes the concert experience available to fans anywhere, anytime. As a result, artists reach a wider audience and everyone gets their due."

Besides Singleton, Ball and Fripp, other people contributing to the project were filmmaker Kenneth Thomas and sound designer Guy Whitmore. The BootlegTV roster was spearheaded by King Crimson (who committed footage of virtually all of their 2000 tour to the company) and other DGM acts. Other bands who signed up to the roster included The Tragically Hip. Other ideas considered for development by the company included investigations into a standalone form of "non-linear music" and the provision of a video connection between artists and audience to allow the latter to follow the former's day-to-day developing work.

Despite raising four million dollars in initial investment, BootlegTV folded in 2001, due a reluctance on the part of investors to continue supporting the original business plan. Fripp would later reflect that the concept had arrived too early and would have required broadband technology (which, at the time, was not widely available) to succeed. For several years, BootlegTV continued as a technology company called Bootleg Networks (championing the development of broadband and building tools to allow other companies to catalogue and stream their video archive content) although Singleton's involvement would be reduced. Although initially unsuccessful, BootlegTV's ideas anticipated later video sharing websites and digitally distributed audio-visual musician initiatives including YouTube, Live Phish Downloads and Pearl Jam Live.

== The Vicar (2001–present) ==
In 2001, Singleton began working under the persona of "The Vicar", an eccentric and imaginary record producer. Initially a pseudonym for Singleton's diary on the DGM website, the persona developed into a multimedia project which incorporated satirical "whodunit" novels set in the music industry, a graphic novel, videoblogs and Singleton's own songwriting career.

From 2001, several incidents of Singleton's production work on King Crimson or Robert Fripp releases were credited to the Vicar, and Singleton also used the persona as a production alias for the 2005 School Aid single 'Where's the Money, Mr Blair?' From 2003 onwards, Singleton's mystery stories about the Vicar (incorporating and narrated by the Vicar's alleged assistant Punk Sanderson) were published as instalments on the Vicar's diary page; from 2007 onwards, the stories were reposted as a video blog presented and narrated by Punk. Various publicity stunts and culture-jamming incidents followed, ostensibly carried out by Punk: these included a period of incarceration within Facebook, 2013’s "Fart For Your Rights" campaign (a mock dirty protest aimed at Universal Music Group, who were at the time selling King Crimson's music without a proper legal agreement or due remuneration) and a 2014 iTunes app of drummer jokes.

The first Vicar single, "Count Your Blessings" was released in 2010, with the debut Vicar album Songbook #1 following three years later in 2013. A second Vicar album, Songbook #2 is currently being recorded. In 2015, Singleton launched the "Be the Singer"/"V Factor" initiative (inviting members of the public to record vocals to existing Vicar backing tracks, with the best performers to be invited to record material for Songbook #2) and an "#IamTheVicar" instagram campaign in which fans could photograph themselves obscuring their faces (a Vicar visual trademark) to appear on the cover of future Vicar releases.

== Discography (selected) ==
=== as producer ===
==== for King Crimson (selected) ====
- King Crimson – Frame by Frame: The Essential King Crimson (compilation, 1991) – engineering, mixing
- King Crimson – The Great Deceiver (Live 1973–1974) (1992, reissued 2007) – mixing, liner notes
- King Crimson – Vrooom (1994) – digital editing, mastering
- King Crimson – Thrak (1995) – assistant producer, digital editing & assembly, composer
- King Crimson – Thrakattak (1996) – arranger, digital editing, mastering
- King Crimson – Epitaph (1997) – producer, liner notes
- King Crimson – The Night Watch (1997) – mixing
- King Crimson – Absent Lovers: Live in Montreal 1984 (1998) – engineering, editing, mixing, mastering
- King Crimson – Cirkus: The Young Persons' Guide to King Crimson Live (compilation, 1999) – producer, mixing, mastering
- King Crimson – The ProjeKcts (box set, 1999) – producer, engineering, mastering
- King Crimson – Heavy ConstruKction (2000) – producer, mastering
- King Crimson – Level Five (2001) – mastering
- King Crimson – Vrooom Vrooom (2001) – producer
- King Crimson – Happy with What You Have to Be Happy With (2002) – producer, engineering
- King Crimson – Ladies of the Road (2002) – producer
- King Crimson – The Power to Believe (2003) – editing, sequencing, production mastering, composer

==== for Robert Fripp ====
- Robert Fripp & The League of Crafty Guitarists – Show of Hands (1991) – mixing
- Robert Fripp – Soundscapes: Live in Argentina (1994) – producer, engineering, digital editing, mastering
- Robert Fripp String Quintet – The Bridge Between (1994) – producer, engineering, liner notes
- Robert Fripp – Radiophonics: 1995 Soundscapes, Vol. 1 (1995) – producer, digital editing, mastering
- Robert Fripp – A Blessing of Tears: 1995 Soundscapes, Vol. 2 (1995) – producer, engineering, digital editing, mastering
- Robert Fripp & The League of Crafty Guitarists – Intergalactic Boogie Express: Live in Europe 1991 (1995) – producer, engineering, editing, mastering
- Robert Fripp – That Which Passes: 1995 Soundscapes, Vol. 3 (1996) – producer, digital editing, mastering
- Robert Fripp & The League of Gentlemen – Thrang Thrang Gozinbulx (1996) – producer, editing, mastering
- Robert Fripp – November Suite: 1996 Soundscapes – Live at Green Park Station (1997) – engineering, digital composition
- Robert Fripp – Pie Jesu (1997) – producer
- Robert Fripp – The Gates of Paradise (1998) – producer, digital composition
- Fripp & Eno – The Equatorial Stars (2005) – administration
- Robert Fripp – At the End of Time: Churchscapes – Live in England & Estonia, 2006 (2007) – editing, engineering, mastering
- Theo Travis/Robert Fripp – Thread (2008) – engineering, photography
- Theo Travis/Robert Fripp – Follow (2012) – engineering
- Robert Fripp/Andrew Keeling/David Singleton – The Wine of Silence (2012) – producer, engineering, treatments, revision, mixing consultant, composer, liner notes

==== for others ====
- Sunday All Over the World – Kneeling at the Shrine (1991) – engineering, mastering, mixing
- FFWD – FFWD (1994) – engineering
- California Guitar Trio – Yamanashi Blues (1994) – remastering
- California Guitar Trio – Invitation (1995) – producer, mixing, mastering
- Gitbox – Touch Wood (1995) – remastering
- Various Artists – Guitars That Rule the World, Vol. 2: Smell the Fuzz: The Superstar Guitar Album (compilation, 1996) – producer, engineering, mixing
- Europa String Choir – The Starving Moon (1996) – producer, arranger, composer
- Ten Seconds – Ten Seconds (1996) – assembly, editing, mastering
- Trey Gunn – The Third Star (1996) – engineering
- Bill Bruford/Ralph Towner/Eddie Gomez – If Summer Had Its Ghosts (1997) – mastering
- Tony Geballe – Native of the Rain (1997) – producer, engineering
- Bill Nelson (musician) – Atom Shop (1998) – mastering
- ProjeKCt One – Live at the Jazz Cafe (1998) – engineering, mixing, mastering
- California Guitar Trio – Pathways (1998) – producer, mixing, mastering
- Various Artists – Sometimes God Smiles: The Young Person's Guide to Discipline, Vol. 2 (compilation, 1998) – producer, composer
- ProjeKCt Two – Space Groove (1998) – editing
- Bill Nelson (musician) – What Now, What Next? (1998) – mastering
- Bill Bruford's Earthworks – A Part, and Yet Apart (1999) – mastering
- John Wetton – Arkangel (1999) – engineering
- Melanie – Beautiful People: The Greatest Hits of Melanie (1999) – mastering
- Jacob Heringman – Black Cow (2000) – engineering
- Bill Bruford's Earthworks – The Sound of Surprise (2001) – mastering
- California Guitar Trio – CG3+2 (2002) – mastering
- Jacob Heringman – The Art of the Lute Player (2002) – engineering
- California Guitar Trio – The First Decade (compilation, 2003) – producer, mixing, mastering, remastering
- School Aid – "Where's the Money, Mr Blair?" single – producer (credited as "The Vicar"), composer
- Jakko M. Jakszyk – The Bruised Romantic Glee Club (2006) – engineering, mixing
- Jakszyk, Fripp & Collins – A Scarcity of Miracles (2011) – engineering

=== as solo artist, band member, songwriter or performing musician ===
==== as David Singleton ====
- 'If You Can Sing in Tune/Lazy Bugger' (single, 1981)

==== with Camilla's Little Secret ====
- 'BEA' (single, 1992)
- "Tantalising Eyes" (single, 1993 – due for reissue April 2015)
- The Steps (album, 1994)

==== as The Vicar ====
- "Count Your Blessings" (single, 2010)
- Songbook #1 (2013)
- Songbook #2 (forthcoming)
