= List of minor planets: 81001–82000 =

The following is a partial list of minor planets, running from minor-planet number 81001 through 82000, inclusive. The primary data for this and other partial lists is based on JPL's "Small-Body Orbital Elements" and data available from the Minor Planet Center. Critical list information is also provided by the MPC, unless otherwise specified from Lowell Observatory. A detailed description of the table's columns and additional sources are given on the main page including a complete list of every page in this series, and a statistical break-up on the dynamical classification of minor planets.

Also see the summary list of all named bodies in numerical and alphabetical order, and the corresponding naming citations for the number range of this particular list. New namings may only be added to this list after official publication, as the preannouncement of names is condemned by the Working Group for Small Bodies Nomenclature of the International Astronomical Union.

Near-Earth obj.	MBA (inner)	MBA (outer)	Centaur
Mars-crosser	MBA (middle)	Jupiter trojan	Trans-Neptunian obj.
Unclassified

== 81001–81100 ==
Designation			Discovery			Properties		Ref
Permanent	Provisional	Named after	Date	Site	Discoverer(s)	Category	Diam.	Ref
81001	2000 EF_{31}	—	March 5, 2000	Socorro	LINEAR	V	1.4 km	MPC · JPL
81002	2000 EG_{31}	—	March 5, 2000	Socorro	LINEAR	V	1.5 km	MPC · JPL
81003	2000 EN_{31}	—	March 5, 2000	Socorro	LINEAR	·	2.4 km	MPC · JPL
81004	2000 ER_{32}	—	March 5, 2000	Socorro	LINEAR	·	3.0 km	MPC · JPL
81005	2000 EW_{32}	—	March 5, 2000	Socorro	LINEAR	·	5.2 km	MPC · JPL
81006	2000 EP_{33}	—	March 5, 2000	Socorro	LINEAR	EUN	3.4 km	MPC · JPL
81007	2000 EV_{33}	—	March 5, 2000	Socorro	LINEAR	·	3.9 km	MPC · JPL
81008	2000 EX_{33}	—	March 5, 2000	Socorro	LINEAR	·	3.5 km	MPC · JPL
81009	2000 EQ_{34}	—	March 5, 2000	Socorro	LINEAR	·	1.9 km	MPC · JPL
81010	2000 EL_{35}	—	March 8, 2000	Socorro	LINEAR	·	2.2 km	MPC · JPL
81011	2000 ED_{36}	—	March 4, 2000	Socorro	LINEAR	PHO	2.2 km	MPC · JPL
81012	2000 EZ_{36}	—	March 8, 2000	Socorro	LINEAR	NYS	2.8 km	MPC · JPL
81013	2000 EY_{37}	—	March 8, 2000	Socorro	LINEAR	·	4.4 km	MPC · JPL
81014	2000 ED_{38}	—	March 8, 2000	Socorro	LINEAR	·	3.4 km	MPC · JPL
81015	2000 EF_{38}	—	March 8, 2000	Socorro	LINEAR	NYS	2.5 km	MPC · JPL
81016	2000 EE_{39}	—	March 8, 2000	Socorro	LINEAR	·	2.2 km	MPC · JPL
81017	2000 EH_{39}	—	March 8, 2000	Socorro	LINEAR	MAS	2.1 km	MPC · JPL
81018	2000 EJ_{39}	—	March 8, 2000	Socorro	LINEAR	·	2.5 km	MPC · JPL
81019	2000 EO_{40}	—	March 8, 2000	Socorro	LINEAR	·	2.7 km	MPC · JPL
81020	2000 EJ_{41}	—	March 8, 2000	Socorro	LINEAR	·	3.7 km	MPC · JPL
81021	2000 ET_{41}	—	March 8, 2000	Socorro	LINEAR	·	3.0 km	MPC · JPL
81022	2000 EL_{42}	—	March 8, 2000	Socorro	LINEAR	·	3.3 km	MPC · JPL
81023	2000 ER_{42}	—	March 8, 2000	Socorro	LINEAR	·	2.4 km	MPC · JPL
81024	2000 EZ_{42}	—	March 8, 2000	Socorro	LINEAR	·	4.7 km	MPC · JPL
81025	2000 EH_{43}	—	March 8, 2000	Socorro	LINEAR	·	2.3 km	MPC · JPL
81026	2000 EE_{44}	—	March 9, 2000	Socorro	LINEAR	·	5.0 km	MPC · JPL
81027	2000 EJ_{44}	—	March 9, 2000	Socorro	LINEAR	·	2.4 km	MPC · JPL
81028	2000 EM_{45}	—	March 9, 2000	Socorro	LINEAR	·	3.0 km	MPC · JPL
81029	2000 EQ_{45}	—	March 9, 2000	Socorro	LINEAR	·	2.6 km	MPC · JPL
81030	2000 EB_{47}	—	March 9, 2000	Socorro	LINEAR	·	4.4 km	MPC · JPL
81031	2000 EG_{48}	—	March 9, 2000	Socorro	LINEAR	·	3.6 km	MPC · JPL
81032	2000 EK_{48}	—	March 9, 2000	Socorro	LINEAR	·	2.9 km	MPC · JPL
81033	2000 EL_{48}	—	March 9, 2000	Socorro	LINEAR	·	3.1 km	MPC · JPL
81034	2000 EE_{49}	—	March 9, 2000	Socorro	LINEAR	DOR	6.7 km	MPC · JPL
81035	2000 EG_{49}	—	March 9, 2000	Socorro	LINEAR	·	3.5 km	MPC · JPL
81036	2000 EQ_{54}	—	March 10, 2000	Kitt Peak	Spacewatch	·	2.8 km	MPC · JPL
81037	2000 EN_{55}	—	March 11, 2000	Prescott	P. G. Comba	·	3.1 km	MPC · JPL
81038	2000 EA_{56}	—	March 5, 2000	Socorro	LINEAR	·	2.6 km	MPC · JPL
81039	2000 EX_{56}	—	March 8, 2000	Socorro	LINEAR	·	2.5 km	MPC · JPL
81040	2000 EC_{57}	—	March 8, 2000	Socorro	LINEAR	(18466)	4.0 km	MPC · JPL
81041	2000 EN_{57}	—	March 8, 2000	Socorro	LINEAR	ADE	5.4 km	MPC · JPL
81042	2000 EP_{57}	—	March 8, 2000	Socorro	LINEAR	·	4.5 km	MPC · JPL
81043	2000 EW_{58}	—	March 9, 2000	Socorro	LINEAR	·	3.4 km	MPC · JPL
81044	2000 EF_{59}	—	March 9, 2000	Socorro	LINEAR	·	2.8 km	MPC · JPL
81045	2000 EA_{60}	—	March 10, 2000	Socorro	LINEAR	·	2.6 km	MPC · JPL
81046	2000 EV_{60}	—	March 10, 2000	Socorro	LINEAR	·	2.5 km	MPC · JPL
81047	2000 EU_{61}	—	March 10, 2000	Socorro	LINEAR	·	1.8 km	MPC · JPL
81048	2000 EU_{62}	—	March 10, 2000	Socorro	LINEAR	NYS	1.9 km	MPC · JPL
81049	2000 EY_{62}	—	March 10, 2000	Socorro	LINEAR	MAS	1.8 km	MPC · JPL
81050	2000 ES_{63}	—	March 10, 2000	Socorro	LINEAR	·	2.0 km	MPC · JPL
81051	2000 ET_{63}	—	March 10, 2000	Socorro	LINEAR	·	2.3 km	MPC · JPL
81052	2000 EV_{63}	—	March 10, 2000	Socorro	LINEAR	·	3.9 km	MPC · JPL
81053	2000 EY_{63}	—	March 10, 2000	Socorro	LINEAR	·	4.3 km	MPC · JPL
81054	2000 ED_{64}	—	March 10, 2000	Socorro	LINEAR	·	2.9 km	MPC · JPL
81055	2000 EJ_{65}	—	March 10, 2000	Socorro	LINEAR	·	2.6 km	MPC · JPL
81056	2000 EK_{65}	—	March 10, 2000	Socorro	LINEAR	(5)	3.2 km	MPC · JPL
81057	2000 EQ_{65}	—	March 10, 2000	Socorro	LINEAR	·	3.0 km	MPC · JPL
81058	2000 EM_{66}	—	March 10, 2000	Socorro	LINEAR	·	3.7 km	MPC · JPL
81059	2000 EN_{67}	—	March 10, 2000	Socorro	LINEAR	·	4.5 km	MPC · JPL
81060	2000 EU_{67}	—	March 10, 2000	Socorro	LINEAR	(5)	3.2 km	MPC · JPL
81061	2000 ET_{68}	—	March 10, 2000	Socorro	LINEAR	·	2.6 km	MPC · JPL
81062	2000 EB_{70}	—	March 10, 2000	Socorro	LINEAR	(5)	2.5 km	MPC · JPL
81063	2000 EJ_{70}	—	March 10, 2000	Socorro	LINEAR	·	5.5 km	MPC · JPL
81064	2000 EG_{71}	—	March 9, 2000	Kitt Peak	Spacewatch	·	1.8 km	MPC · JPL
81065	2000 ET_{71}	—	March 10, 2000	Kitt Peak	Spacewatch	·	1.6 km	MPC · JPL
81066	2000 ES_{73}	—	March 10, 2000	Kitt Peak	Spacewatch	·	2.0 km	MPC · JPL
81067	2000 EV_{74}	—	March 11, 2000	Kitt Peak	Spacewatch	·	2.4 km	MPC · JPL
81068	2000 EC_{77}	—	March 5, 2000	Socorro	LINEAR	·	4.9 km	MPC · JPL
81069	2000 EW_{77}	—	March 5, 2000	Socorro	LINEAR	·	2.9 km	MPC · JPL
81070	2000 ET_{78}	—	March 5, 2000	Socorro	LINEAR	·	2.7 km	MPC · JPL
81071	2000 EY_{78}	—	March 5, 2000	Socorro	LINEAR	NYS	2.5 km	MPC · JPL
81072	2000 EC_{80}	—	March 5, 2000	Socorro	LINEAR	·	2.5 km	MPC · JPL
81073	2000 EP_{83}	—	March 5, 2000	Socorro	LINEAR	V	1.8 km	MPC · JPL
81074	2000 EZ_{84}	—	March 8, 2000	Socorro	LINEAR	·	6.6 km	MPC · JPL
81075	2000 EM_{85}	—	March 8, 2000	Socorro	LINEAR	·	2.8 km	MPC · JPL
81076	2000 EQ_{86}	—	March 8, 2000	Socorro	LINEAR	·	2.7 km	MPC · JPL
81077	2000 EZ_{86}	—	March 8, 2000	Socorro	LINEAR	·	6.8 km	MPC · JPL
81078	2000 ED_{87}	—	March 8, 2000	Socorro	LINEAR	·	2.9 km	MPC · JPL
81079	2000 ES_{88}	—	March 9, 2000	Socorro	LINEAR	·	2.6 km	MPC · JPL
81080	2000 ET_{88}	—	March 9, 2000	Socorro	LINEAR	RAF · fast?	2.4 km	MPC · JPL
81081	2000 EJ_{89}	—	March 9, 2000	Socorro	LINEAR	PHO	1.6 km	MPC · JPL
81082	2000 EK_{89}	—	March 9, 2000	Socorro	LINEAR	·	2.8 km	MPC · JPL
81083	2000 EX_{89}	—	March 9, 2000	Socorro	LINEAR	·	3.0 km	MPC · JPL
81084	2000 EY_{89}	—	March 9, 2000	Socorro	LINEAR	·	2.7 km	MPC · JPL
81085	2000 EO_{90}	—	March 9, 2000	Socorro	LINEAR	·	3.1 km	MPC · JPL
81086	2000 EN_{91}	—	March 9, 2000	Socorro	LINEAR	·	3.7 km	MPC · JPL
81087	2000 EU_{91}	—	March 9, 2000	Socorro	LINEAR	(5)	2.4 km	MPC · JPL
81088	2000 EM_{92}	—	March 9, 2000	Socorro	LINEAR	·	2.3 km	MPC · JPL
81089	2000 EQ_{92}	—	March 9, 2000	Socorro	LINEAR	·	3.2 km	MPC · JPL
81090	2000 EG_{95}	—	March 9, 2000	Socorro	LINEAR	·	3.7 km	MPC · JPL
81091	2000 EO_{95}	—	March 10, 2000	Socorro	LINEAR	(5)	3.0 km	MPC · JPL
81092	2000 ES_{100}	—	March 12, 2000	Kitt Peak	Spacewatch	NYS	2.0 km	MPC · JPL
81093	2000 EH_{102}	—	March 14, 2000	Kitt Peak	Spacewatch	·	3.6 km	MPC · JPL
81094	2000 ER_{104}	—	March 13, 2000	Socorro	LINEAR	·	3.6 km	MPC · JPL
81095	2000 EK_{105}	—	March 11, 2000	Anderson Mesa	LONEOS	·	3.2 km	MPC · JPL
81096	2000 EG_{106}	—	March 11, 2000	Anderson Mesa	LONEOS	·	4.3 km	MPC · JPL
81097	2000 EE_{107}	—	March 5, 2000	Haleakala	NEAT	V	1.7 km	MPC · JPL
81098	2000 EH_{108}	—	March 8, 2000	Socorro	LINEAR	EUN	3.4 km	MPC · JPL
81099	2000 EG_{109}	—	March 8, 2000	Haleakala	NEAT	·	3.1 km	MPC · JPL
81100	2000 EO_{109}	—	March 8, 2000	Haleakala	NEAT	·	2.4 km	MPC · JPL

== 81101–81200 ==
back to top

Designation			Discovery			Properties		Ref
Permanent	Provisional	Named after	Date	Site	Discoverer(s)	Category	Diam.	Ref
81101	2000 ER_{109}	—	March 8, 2000	Haleakala	NEAT	ADE	6.6 km	MPC · JPL
81102	2000 EU_{110}	—	March 8, 2000	Haleakala	NEAT	·	3.5 km	MPC · JPL
81103	2000 ES_{112}	—	March 9, 2000	Socorro	LINEAR	V	2.9 km	MPC · JPL
81104	2000 EW_{112}	—	March 9, 2000	Socorro	LINEAR	·	3.8 km	MPC · JPL
81105	2000 EM_{114}	—	March 9, 2000	Socorro	LINEAR	·	4.9 km	MPC · JPL
81106	2000 EW_{115}	—	March 10, 2000	Kitt Peak	Spacewatch	V	1.5 km	MPC · JPL
81107	2000 EY_{116}	—	March 10, 2000	Socorro	LINEAR	·	2.1 km	MPC · JPL
81108	2000 EG_{118}	—	March 11, 2000	Anderson Mesa	LONEOS	PHO	3.4 km	MPC · JPL
81109	2000 EN_{120}	—	March 11, 2000	Anderson Mesa	LONEOS	·	3.0 km	MPC · JPL
81110	2000 ET_{120}	—	March 11, 2000	Anderson Mesa	LONEOS	·	2.1 km	MPC · JPL
81111	2000 EM_{121}	—	March 11, 2000	Anderson Mesa	LONEOS	EUN	3.0 km	MPC · JPL
81112	2000 EQ_{123}	—	March 11, 2000	Anderson Mesa	LONEOS	·	2.5 km	MPC · JPL
81113	2000 EU_{123}	—	March 11, 2000	Anderson Mesa	LONEOS	·	4.3 km	MPC · JPL
81114	2000 EV_{123}	—	March 11, 2000	Anderson Mesa	LONEOS	·	3.0 km	MPC · JPL
81115	2000 EX_{123}	—	March 11, 2000	Anderson Mesa	LONEOS	·	2.2 km	MPC · JPL
81116	2000 EY_{123}	—	March 11, 2000	Anderson Mesa	LONEOS	NYS	2.5 km	MPC · JPL
81117	2000 EL_{124}	—	March 11, 2000	Anderson Mesa	LONEOS	NYS	2.7 km	MPC · JPL
81118	2000 EP_{125}	—	March 11, 2000	Anderson Mesa	LONEOS	·	2.2 km	MPC · JPL
81119	2000 EW_{125}	—	March 11, 2000	Anderson Mesa	LONEOS	NYS	3.0 km	MPC · JPL
81120	2000 ED_{126}	—	March 11, 2000	Anderson Mesa	LONEOS	·	2.9 km	MPC · JPL
81121	2000 ET_{126}	—	March 11, 2000	Anderson Mesa	LONEOS	MIS	4.1 km	MPC · JPL
81122	2000 EZ_{126}	—	March 11, 2000	Anderson Mesa	LONEOS	·	3.4 km	MPC · JPL
81123	2000 EA_{128}	—	March 11, 2000	Anderson Mesa	LONEOS	·	2.7 km	MPC · JPL
81124	2000 EB_{129}	—	March 11, 2000	Anderson Mesa	LONEOS	·	4.2 km	MPC · JPL
81125	2000 EJ_{129}	—	March 11, 2000	Anderson Mesa	LONEOS	·	3.2 km	MPC · JPL
81126	2000 EQ_{129}	—	March 11, 2000	Anderson Mesa	LONEOS	·	6.2 km	MPC · JPL
81127	2000 EW_{129}	—	March 11, 2000	Anderson Mesa	LONEOS	MAS	2.0 km	MPC · JPL
81128	2000 EB_{131}	—	March 11, 2000	Anderson Mesa	LONEOS	·	2.9 km	MPC · JPL
81129	2000 ED_{131}	—	March 11, 2000	Anderson Mesa	LONEOS	MIS	2.8 km	MPC · JPL
81130	2000 EJ_{131}	—	March 11, 2000	Socorro	LINEAR	(12739)	4.2 km	MPC · JPL
81131	2000 EW_{131}	—	March 11, 2000	Anderson Mesa	LONEOS	·	3.1 km	MPC · JPL
81132	2000 EU_{133}	—	March 11, 2000	Anderson Mesa	LONEOS	·	4.3 km	MPC · JPL
81133	2000 EA_{134}	—	March 11, 2000	Anderson Mesa	LONEOS	RAF	2.1 km	MPC · JPL
81134	2000 ED_{134}	—	March 11, 2000	Anderson Mesa	LONEOS	·	6.4 km	MPC · JPL
81135	2000 EG_{134}	—	March 11, 2000	Anderson Mesa	LONEOS	·	2.6 km	MPC · JPL
81136	2000 EK_{134}	—	March 11, 2000	Anderson Mesa	LONEOS	·	3.1 km	MPC · JPL
81137	2000 EX_{135}	—	March 11, 2000	Anderson Mesa	LONEOS	V	1.5 km	MPC · JPL
81138	2000 ED_{136}	—	March 11, 2000	Socorro	LINEAR	·	2.0 km	MPC · JPL
81139	2000 EE_{136}	—	March 11, 2000	Socorro	LINEAR	·	1.8 km	MPC · JPL
81140	2000 EX_{136}	—	March 12, 2000	Socorro	LINEAR	ERI	3.9 km	MPC · JPL
81141	2000 EP_{137}	—	March 7, 2000	Socorro	LINEAR	MAR	2.8 km	MPC · JPL
81142	2000 ES_{138}	—	March 11, 2000	Catalina	CSS	·	6.4 km	MPC · JPL
81143	2000 ES_{139}	—	March 12, 2000	Catalina	CSS	·	4.0 km	MPC · JPL
81144	2000 EX_{139}	—	March 12, 2000	Catalina	CSS	·	4.3 km	MPC · JPL
81145	2000 EN_{141}	—	March 2, 2000	Catalina	CSS	·	2.3 km	MPC · JPL
81146	2000 EW_{142}	—	March 3, 2000	Catalina	CSS	·	5.0 km	MPC · JPL
81147	2000 EF_{145}	—	March 3, 2000	Catalina	CSS	·	2.8 km	MPC · JPL
81148	2000 EN_{145}	—	March 3, 2000	Catalina	CSS	·	2.9 km	MPC · JPL
81149	2000 ED_{146}	—	March 4, 2000	Socorro	LINEAR	·	3.7 km	MPC · JPL
81150	2000 EO_{146}	—	March 4, 2000	Socorro	LINEAR	·	3.3 km	MPC · JPL
81151	2000 EV_{146}	—	March 4, 2000	Socorro	LINEAR	·	2.9 km	MPC · JPL
81152	2000 EY_{148}	—	March 4, 2000	Catalina	CSS	EUN	4.1 km	MPC · JPL
81153	2000 ES_{150}	—	March 5, 2000	Haleakala	NEAT	·	3.5 km	MPC · JPL
81154	2000 EC_{152}	—	March 6, 2000	Haleakala	NEAT	MAR	2.7 km	MPC · JPL
81155	2000 EL_{152}	—	March 6, 2000	Haleakala	NEAT	·	4.2 km	MPC · JPL
81156	2000 ES_{152}	—	March 6, 2000	Haleakala	NEAT	ADE	7.3 km	MPC · JPL
81157	2000 EA_{153}	—	March 6, 2000	Haleakala	NEAT	·	2.5 km	MPC · JPL
81158	2000 EE_{154}	—	March 6, 2000	Haleakala	NEAT	·	5.0 km	MPC · JPL
81159	2000 EF_{154}	—	March 6, 2000	Haleakala	NEAT	·	2.6 km	MPC · JPL
81160	2000 EU_{154}	—	March 6, 2000	Haleakala	NEAT	·	3.0 km	MPC · JPL
81161	2000 ES_{156}	—	March 10, 2000	Socorro	LINEAR	·	2.7 km	MPC · JPL
81162	2000 EK_{158}	—	March 12, 2000	Anderson Mesa	LONEOS	JUN	2.2 km	MPC · JPL
81163	2000 ER_{158}	—	March 12, 2000	Anderson Mesa	LONEOS	EUN	3.6 km	MPC · JPL
81164	2000 ED_{159}	—	March 3, 2000	Socorro	LINEAR	·	2.6 km	MPC · JPL
81165	2000 EY_{159}	—	March 3, 2000	Socorro	LINEAR	·	5.3 km	MPC · JPL
81166	2000 ES_{160}	—	March 3, 2000	Socorro	LINEAR	·	2.6 km	MPC · JPL
81167	2000 EH_{164}	—	March 3, 2000	Socorro	LINEAR	·	2.9 km	MPC · JPL
81168	2000 ED_{165}	—	March 3, 2000	Socorro	LINEAR	·	1.9 km	MPC · JPL
81169	2000 EL_{165}	—	March 3, 2000	Socorro	LINEAR	·	2.5 km	MPC · JPL
81170	2000 ES_{165}	—	March 3, 2000	Socorro	LINEAR	·	3.5 km	MPC · JPL
81171	2000 EE_{166}	—	March 3, 2000	Socorro	LINEAR	·	3.1 km	MPC · JPL
81172	2000 EQ_{166}	—	March 4, 2000	Socorro	LINEAR	·	2.5 km	MPC · JPL
81173	2000 EY_{167}	—	March 4, 2000	Socorro	LINEAR	BRA	4.2 km	MPC · JPL
81174	2000 EO_{170}	—	March 5, 2000	Socorro	LINEAR	·	3.7 km	MPC · JPL
81175	2000 ER_{170}	—	March 5, 2000	Socorro	LINEAR	V	2.3 km	MPC · JPL
81176	2000 EO_{171}	—	March 5, 2000	Socorro	LINEAR	PHO	2.6 km	MPC · JPL
81177	2000 EJ_{173}	—	March 4, 2000	Socorro	LINEAR	PHO	2.9 km	MPC · JPL
81178	2000 EB_{175}	—	March 2, 2000	Catalina	CSS	·	2.9 km	MPC · JPL
81179	2000 EL_{179}	—	March 4, 2000	Socorro	LINEAR	·	2.2 km	MPC · JPL
81180	2000 EJ_{180}	—	March 4, 2000	Socorro	LINEAR	·	2.6 km	MPC · JPL
81181	2000 EH_{182}	—	March 4, 2000	Socorro	LINEAR	PHO	2.1 km	MPC · JPL
81182	2000 EW_{183}	—	March 5, 2000	Socorro	LINEAR	·	3.9 km	MPC · JPL
81183	2000 EX_{183}	—	March 5, 2000	Socorro	LINEAR	·	3.1 km	MPC · JPL
81184	2000 EK_{186}	—	March 2, 2000	Kitt Peak	Spacewatch	·	2.2 km	MPC · JPL
81185	2000 EM_{186}	—	March 2, 2000	Catalina	CSS	·	2.0 km	MPC · JPL
81186	2000 ED_{189}	—	March 3, 2000	Socorro	LINEAR	·	2.1 km	MPC · JPL
81187	2000 EL_{190}	—	March 3, 2000	Socorro	LINEAR	·	2.1 km	MPC · JPL
81188	2000 EB_{193}	—	March 3, 2000	Socorro	LINEAR	·	2.5 km	MPC · JPL
81189	2000 EE_{193}	—	March 3, 2000	Socorro	LINEAR	·	2.0 km	MPC · JPL
81190	2000 EY_{193}	—	March 3, 2000	Socorro	LINEAR	·	3.1 km	MPC · JPL
81191	2000 EJ_{194}	—	March 3, 2000	Socorro	LINEAR	(5)	2.0 km	MPC · JPL
81192	2000 EX_{195}	—	March 3, 2000	Socorro	LINEAR	·	2.0 km	MPC · JPL
81193	2000 EW_{197}	—	March 1, 2000	Catalina	CSS	·	3.4 km	MPC · JPL
81194	2000 EF_{198}	—	March 1, 2000	Catalina	CSS	V	2.0 km	MPC · JPL
81195	2000 EN_{198}	—	March 1, 2000	Catalina	CSS	HNS	4.9 km	MPC · JPL
81196	2000 FT_{1}	—	March 25, 2000	Kitt Peak	Spacewatch	·	3.6 km	MPC · JPL
81197	2000 FQ_{2}	—	March 26, 2000	Kitt Peak	Spacewatch	·	4.1 km	MPC · JPL
81198	2000 FS_{4}	—	March 27, 2000	Kitt Peak	Spacewatch	·	4.8 km	MPC · JPL
81199	2000 FK_{5}	—	March 25, 2000	Kitt Peak	Spacewatch	·	2.3 km	MPC · JPL
81200	2000 FP_{5}	—	March 25, 2000	Kitt Peak	Spacewatch	AGN	2.0 km	MPC · JPL

== 81201–81300 ==
back to top

Designation			Discovery			Properties		Ref
Permanent	Provisional	Named after	Date	Site	Discoverer(s)	Category	Diam.	Ref
81201	2000 FL_{6}	—	March 25, 2000	Kitt Peak	Spacewatch	·	3.5 km	MPC · JPL
81202	2000 FV_{8}	—	March 29, 2000	Kitt Peak	Spacewatch	·	4.2 km	MPC · JPL
81203 Polynesia	2000 FQ_{10}	Polynesia	March 23, 2000	Punaauia	Pelle, J. C.	·	3.9 km	MPC · JPL
81204	2000 FV_{10}	—	March 30, 2000	Kitt Peak	Spacewatch	·	1.9 km	MPC · JPL
81205	2000 FW_{10}	—	March 30, 2000	Kitt Peak	Spacewatch	KOR	3.3 km	MPC · JPL
81206	2000 FB_{11}	—	March 30, 2000	Višnjan Observatory	K. Korlević	ADE	5.1 km	MPC · JPL
81207	2000 FD_{15}	—	March 29, 2000	Kvistaberg	Uppsala-DLR Asteroid Survey	·	3.1 km	MPC · JPL
81208	2000 FO_{15}	—	March 28, 2000	Socorro	LINEAR	NYS	2.2 km	MPC · JPL
81209	2000 FQ_{15}	—	March 28, 2000	Socorro	LINEAR	·	3.1 km	MPC · JPL
81210	2000 FT_{16}	—	March 28, 2000	Socorro	LINEAR	·	3.9 km	MPC · JPL
81211	2000 FX_{16}	—	March 28, 2000	Socorro	LINEAR	·	5.5 km	MPC · JPL
81212	2000 FD_{18}	—	March 29, 2000	Socorro	LINEAR	PHO	2.5 km	MPC · JPL
81213	2000 FJ_{18}	—	March 29, 2000	Socorro	LINEAR	·	5.2 km	MPC · JPL
81214	2000 FL_{18}	—	March 29, 2000	Socorro	LINEAR	·	5.3 km	MPC · JPL
81215	2000 FM_{18}	—	March 29, 2000	Socorro	LINEAR	·	3.8 km	MPC · JPL
81216	2000 FQ_{18}	—	March 29, 2000	Socorro	LINEAR	·	2.8 km	MPC · JPL
81217	2000 FQ_{19}	—	March 29, 2000	Socorro	LINEAR	EUN	2.4 km	MPC · JPL
81218	2000 FC_{20}	—	March 29, 2000	Socorro	LINEAR	·	7.6 km	MPC · JPL
81219	2000 FU_{20}	—	March 29, 2000	Socorro	LINEAR	·	4.4 km	MPC · JPL
81220	2000 FO_{21}	—	March 29, 2000	Socorro	LINEAR	EUN	2.7 km	MPC · JPL
81221	2000 FY_{21}	—	March 29, 2000	Socorro	LINEAR	EOS	4.9 km	MPC · JPL
81222	2000 FE_{22}	—	March 29, 2000	Socorro	LINEAR	·	6.1 km	MPC · JPL
81223	2000 FP_{23}	—	March 29, 2000	Socorro	LINEAR	slow	3.1 km	MPC · JPL
81224	2000 FV_{23}	—	March 29, 2000	Socorro	LINEAR	·	3.3 km	MPC · JPL
81225	2000 FE_{24}	—	March 29, 2000	Socorro	LINEAR	EUN	4.6 km	MPC · JPL
81226	2000 FF_{24}	—	March 29, 2000	Socorro	LINEAR	·	5.8 km	MPC · JPL
81227	2000 FK_{24}	—	March 29, 2000	Socorro	LINEAR	slow	4.1 km	MPC · JPL
81228	2000 FG_{25}	—	March 26, 2000	Anderson Mesa	LONEOS	MAS	1.8 km	MPC · JPL
81229	2000 FF_{26}	—	March 27, 2000	Anderson Mesa	LONEOS	NYS	3.7 km	MPC · JPL
81230	2000 FN_{26}	—	March 27, 2000	Anderson Mesa	LONEOS	EUN	3.2 km	MPC · JPL
81231	2000 FV_{26}	—	March 27, 2000	Anderson Mesa	LONEOS	·	2.7 km	MPC · JPL
81232	2000 FW_{26}	—	March 27, 2000	Anderson Mesa	LONEOS	·	1.8 km	MPC · JPL
81233	2000 FX_{26}	—	March 27, 2000	Anderson Mesa	LONEOS	·	5.6 km	MPC · JPL
81234	2000 FD_{27}	—	March 27, 2000	Anderson Mesa	LONEOS	·	3.7 km	MPC · JPL
81235	2000 FM_{27}	—	March 27, 2000	Anderson Mesa	LONEOS	(11882)	3.4 km	MPC · JPL
81236	2000 FZ_{27}	—	March 27, 2000	Anderson Mesa	LONEOS	HNS	3.9 km	MPC · JPL
81237	2000 FD_{28}	—	March 27, 2000	Anderson Mesa	LONEOS	·	2.3 km	MPC · JPL
81238	2000 FN_{28}	—	March 27, 2000	Anderson Mesa	LONEOS	·	3.3 km	MPC · JPL
81239	2000 FR_{28}	—	March 27, 2000	Anderson Mesa	LONEOS	·	2.9 km	MPC · JPL
81240	2000 FO_{29}	—	March 27, 2000	Anderson Mesa	LONEOS	·	7.8 km	MPC · JPL
81241	2000 FW_{29}	—	March 27, 2000	Anderson Mesa	LONEOS	·	2.9 km	MPC · JPL
81242	2000 FB_{30}	—	March 27, 2000	Anderson Mesa	LONEOS	·	2.4 km	MPC · JPL
81243	2000 FJ_{31}	—	March 28, 2000	Socorro	LINEAR	·	3.3 km	MPC · JPL
81244	2000 FC_{33}	—	March 29, 2000	Socorro	LINEAR	·	2.9 km	MPC · JPL
81245	2000 FU_{33}	—	March 29, 2000	Socorro	LINEAR	V	1.7 km	MPC · JPL
81246	2000 FH_{34}	—	March 29, 2000	Socorro	LINEAR	·	3.0 km	MPC · JPL
81247	2000 FR_{34}	—	March 29, 2000	Socorro	LINEAR	EUN	2.6 km	MPC · JPL
81248	2000 FU_{34}	—	March 29, 2000	Socorro	LINEAR	·	2.9 km	MPC · JPL
81249	2000 FV_{34}	—	March 29, 2000	Socorro	LINEAR	HOF	6.4 km	MPC · JPL
81250	2000 FX_{34}	—	March 29, 2000	Socorro	LINEAR	RAF	1.7 km	MPC · JPL
81251	2000 FC_{35}	—	March 29, 2000	Socorro	LINEAR	·	4.6 km	MPC · JPL
81252	2000 FG_{35}	—	March 29, 2000	Socorro	LINEAR	·	5.1 km	MPC · JPL
81253	2000 FN_{35}	—	March 29, 2000	Socorro	LINEAR	·	2.9 km	MPC · JPL
81254	2000 FR_{35}	—	March 29, 2000	Socorro	LINEAR	(5)	2.9 km	MPC · JPL
81255	2000 FT_{35}	—	March 29, 2000	Socorro	LINEAR	·	2.2 km	MPC · JPL
81256	2000 FM_{36}	—	March 29, 2000	Socorro	LINEAR	·	2.2 km	MPC · JPL
81257	2000 FQ_{36}	—	March 29, 2000	Socorro	LINEAR	·	3.4 km	MPC · JPL
81258	2000 FD_{38}	—	March 29, 2000	Socorro	LINEAR	·	3.1 km	MPC · JPL
81259	2000 FS_{38}	—	March 29, 2000	Socorro	LINEAR	MAS	2.1 km	MPC · JPL
81260	2000 FJ_{41}	—	March 29, 2000	Socorro	LINEAR	·	2.4 km	MPC · JPL
81261	2000 FP_{43}	—	March 29, 2000	Socorro	LINEAR	·	3.1 km	MPC · JPL
81262	2000 FW_{43}	—	March 29, 2000	Socorro	LINEAR	·	3.1 km	MPC · JPL
81263	2000 FZ_{43}	—	March 29, 2000	Socorro	LINEAR	V	1.4 km	MPC · JPL
81264	2000 FF_{45}	—	March 29, 2000	Socorro	LINEAR	MAR	1.7 km	MPC · JPL
81265	2000 FH_{45}	—	March 29, 2000	Socorro	LINEAR	·	2.8 km	MPC · JPL
81266	2000 FT_{45}	—	March 29, 2000	Socorro	LINEAR	V	1.5 km	MPC · JPL
81267	2000 FA_{46}	—	March 29, 2000	Socorro	LINEAR	·	3.1 km	MPC · JPL
81268	2000 FY_{47}	—	March 29, 2000	Socorro	LINEAR	·	2.7 km	MPC · JPL
81269	2000 FK_{48}	—	March 29, 2000	Socorro	LINEAR	·	2.8 km	MPC · JPL
81270	2000 FN_{48}	—	March 29, 2000	Socorro	LINEAR	·	2.5 km	MPC · JPL
81271	2000 FS_{48}	—	March 30, 2000	Socorro	LINEAR	BRA	5.3 km	MPC · JPL
81272	2000 FA_{49}	—	March 30, 2000	Socorro	LINEAR	ADE	4.6 km	MPC · JPL
81273	2000 FA_{50}	—	March 30, 2000	Socorro	LINEAR	·	3.8 km	MPC · JPL
81274	2000 FA_{51}	—	March 29, 2000	Kitt Peak	Spacewatch	·	2.1 km	MPC · JPL
81275	2000 FC_{53}	—	March 30, 2000	Kitt Peak	Spacewatch	·	3.3 km	MPC · JPL
81276	2000 FC_{54}	—	March 27, 2000	Anderson Mesa	LONEOS	·	2.2 km	MPC · JPL
81277	2000 FZ_{55}	—	March 29, 2000	Socorro	LINEAR	·	2.5 km	MPC · JPL
81278	2000 FK_{56}	—	March 29, 2000	Socorro	LINEAR	·	3.9 km	MPC · JPL
81279	2000 FU_{56}	—	March 29, 2000	Socorro	LINEAR	·	2.5 km	MPC · JPL
81280	2000 FK_{57}	—	March 29, 2000	Socorro	LINEAR	·	2.0 km	MPC · JPL
81281	2000 FP_{58}	—	March 26, 2000	Anderson Mesa	LONEOS	PHO	2.9 km	MPC · JPL
81282	2000 FC_{59}	—	March 28, 2000	Socorro	LINEAR	V	2.0 km	MPC · JPL
81283	2000 FF_{59}	—	March 29, 2000	Socorro	LINEAR	·	2.8 km	MPC · JPL
81284	2000 FK_{59}	—	March 29, 2000	Socorro	LINEAR	·	3.7 km	MPC · JPL
81285	2000 FT_{59}	—	March 29, 2000	Socorro	LINEAR	·	3.2 km	MPC · JPL
81286	2000 FE_{61}	—	March 29, 2000	Socorro	LINEAR	MAR	3.0 km	MPC · JPL
81287	2000 FG_{62}	—	March 26, 2000	Anderson Mesa	LONEOS	·	3.0 km	MPC · JPL
81288	2000 FP_{63}	—	March 29, 2000	Socorro	LINEAR	AGN	2.7 km	MPC · JPL
81289	2000 FC_{65}	—	March 26, 2000	Anderson Mesa	LONEOS	·	2.9 km	MPC · JPL
81290	2000 FM_{69}	—	March 27, 2000	Anderson Mesa	LONEOS	WIT	2.1 km	MPC · JPL
81291	2000 FA_{70}	—	March 27, 2000	Kitt Peak	Spacewatch	·	4.3 km	MPC · JPL
81292	2000 FQ_{71}	—	March 26, 2000	Anderson Mesa	LONEOS	·	3.7 km	MPC · JPL
81293	2000 FR_{72}	—	March 25, 2000	Kitt Peak	Spacewatch	·	2.0 km	MPC · JPL
81294	2000 GM	—	April 2, 2000	Prescott	P. G. Comba	·	3.0 km	MPC · JPL
81295	2000 GU	—	April 2, 2000	Kitt Peak	Spacewatch	·	2.1 km	MPC · JPL
81296	2000 GJ_{1}	—	April 2, 2000	Socorro	LINEAR	·	2.7 km	MPC · JPL
81297	2000 GR_{1}	—	April 4, 2000	Prescott	P. G. Comba	·	7.0 km	MPC · JPL
81298	2000 GW_{1}	—	April 4, 2000	Socorro	LINEAR	PHO	4.8 km	MPC · JPL
81299	2000 GP_{2}	—	April 2, 2000	Socorro	LINEAR	·	4.2 km	MPC · JPL
81300	2000 GW_{2}	—	April 3, 2000	Socorro	LINEAR	·	3.7 km	MPC · JPL

== 81301–81400 ==
back to top

Designation			Discovery			Properties		Ref
Permanent	Provisional	Named after	Date	Site	Discoverer(s)	Category	Diam.	Ref
81301	2000 GM_{3}	—	April 5, 2000	Socorro	LINEAR	BAR	2.1 km	MPC · JPL
81302	2000 GE_{5}	—	April 3, 2000	Socorro	LINEAR	·	3.5 km	MPC · JPL
81303	2000 GY_{5}	—	April 4, 2000	Socorro	LINEAR	·	4.7 km	MPC · JPL
81304	2000 GZ_{5}	—	April 4, 2000	Socorro	LINEAR	·	3.4 km	MPC · JPL
81305	2000 GP_{6}	—	April 4, 2000	Socorro	LINEAR	·	2.8 km	MPC · JPL
81306	2000 GV_{7}	—	April 4, 2000	Socorro	LINEAR	·	4.4 km	MPC · JPL
81307	2000 GZ_{8}	—	April 5, 2000	Socorro	LINEAR	·	2.6 km	MPC · JPL
81308	2000 GC_{9}	—	April 5, 2000	Socorro	LINEAR	·	2.8 km	MPC · JPL
81309	2000 GD_{10}	—	April 5, 2000	Socorro	LINEAR	MAS	1.8 km	MPC · JPL
81310	2000 GM_{10}	—	April 5, 2000	Socorro	LINEAR	·	2.2 km	MPC · JPL
81311	2000 GU_{10}	—	April 5, 2000	Socorro	LINEAR	·	3.1 km	MPC · JPL
81312	2000 GL_{11}	—	April 5, 2000	Socorro	LINEAR	·	2.7 km	MPC · JPL
81313	2000 GD_{12}	—	April 5, 2000	Socorro	LINEAR	·	3.2 km	MPC · JPL
81314	2000 GQ_{12}	—	April 5, 2000	Socorro	LINEAR	·	2.4 km	MPC · JPL
81315	2000 GX_{12}	—	April 5, 2000	Socorro	LINEAR	·	2.4 km	MPC · JPL
81316	2000 GE_{13}	—	April 5, 2000	Socorro	LINEAR	·	3.4 km	MPC · JPL
81317	2000 GM_{14}	—	April 5, 2000	Socorro	LINEAR	·	3.2 km	MPC · JPL
81318	2000 GW_{14}	—	April 5, 2000	Socorro	LINEAR	·	2.0 km	MPC · JPL
81319	2000 GB_{15}	—	April 5, 2000	Socorro	LINEAR	·	2.3 km	MPC · JPL
81320	2000 GP_{15}	—	April 5, 2000	Socorro	LINEAR	·	5.0 km	MPC · JPL
81321	2000 GE_{17}	—	April 5, 2000	Socorro	LINEAR	·	2.9 km	MPC · JPL
81322	2000 GC_{20}	—	April 5, 2000	Socorro	LINEAR	·	2.3 km	MPC · JPL
81323	2000 GM_{20}	—	April 5, 2000	Socorro	LINEAR	·	5.4 km	MPC · JPL
81324	2000 GC_{21}	—	April 5, 2000	Socorro	LINEAR	·	4.6 km	MPC · JPL
81325	2000 GM_{22}	—	April 5, 2000	Socorro	LINEAR	·	3.2 km	MPC · JPL
81326	2000 GO_{25}	—	April 5, 2000	Socorro	LINEAR	·	2.3 km	MPC · JPL
81327	2000 GY_{26}	—	April 5, 2000	Socorro	LINEAR	·	2.6 km	MPC · JPL
81328	2000 GA_{28}	—	April 5, 2000	Socorro	LINEAR	·	3.6 km	MPC · JPL
81329	2000 GE_{28}	—	April 5, 2000	Socorro	LINEAR	·	3.5 km	MPC · JPL
81330	2000 GN_{30}	—	April 5, 2000	Socorro	LINEAR	·	6.3 km	MPC · JPL
81331	2000 GF_{32}	—	April 5, 2000	Socorro	LINEAR	·	2.2 km	MPC · JPL
81332	2000 GJ_{32}	—	April 5, 2000	Socorro	LINEAR	·	3.7 km	MPC · JPL
81333	2000 GR_{32}	—	April 5, 2000	Socorro	LINEAR	·	4.2 km	MPC · JPL
81334	2000 GS_{32}	—	April 5, 2000	Socorro	LINEAR	·	3.1 km	MPC · JPL
81335	2000 GP_{33}	—	April 5, 2000	Socorro	LINEAR	·	2.2 km	MPC · JPL
81336	2000 GX_{35}	—	April 5, 2000	Socorro	LINEAR	·	3.4 km	MPC · JPL
81337	2000 GP_{36}	—	April 5, 2000	Socorro	LINEAR	EUN	3.0 km	MPC · JPL
81338	2000 GR_{37}	—	April 5, 2000	Socorro	LINEAR	·	4.0 km	MPC · JPL
81339	2000 GB_{38}	—	April 5, 2000	Socorro	LINEAR	·	3.2 km	MPC · JPL
81340	2000 GL_{38}	—	April 5, 2000	Socorro	LINEAR	·	5.1 km	MPC · JPL
81341	2000 GS_{38}	—	April 5, 2000	Socorro	LINEAR	ADE	6.2 km	MPC · JPL
81342	2000 GJ_{40}	—	April 5, 2000	Socorro	LINEAR	EUN	3.3 km	MPC · JPL
81343	2000 GB_{41}	—	April 5, 2000	Socorro	LINEAR	·	1.6 km	MPC · JPL
81344	2000 GJ_{41}	—	April 5, 2000	Socorro	LINEAR	·	2.9 km	MPC · JPL
81345	2000 GW_{41}	—	April 5, 2000	Socorro	LINEAR	·	2.9 km	MPC · JPL
81346	2000 GX_{43}	—	April 5, 2000	Socorro	LINEAR	·	2.7 km	MPC · JPL
81347	2000 GB_{47}	—	April 5, 2000	Socorro	LINEAR	·	2.2 km	MPC · JPL
81348	2000 GP_{47}	—	April 5, 2000	Socorro	LINEAR	PAD	4.0 km	MPC · JPL
81349	2000 GV_{47}	—	April 5, 2000	Socorro	LINEAR	·	2.5 km	MPC · JPL
81350	2000 GC_{49}	—	April 5, 2000	Socorro	LINEAR	·	3.9 km	MPC · JPL
81351	2000 GH_{50}	—	April 5, 2000	Socorro	LINEAR	·	2.9 km	MPC · JPL
81352	2000 GN_{50}	—	April 5, 2000	Socorro	LINEAR	·	4.7 km	MPC · JPL
81353	2000 GP_{50}	—	April 5, 2000	Socorro	LINEAR	·	1.6 km	MPC · JPL
81354	2000 GR_{52}	—	April 5, 2000	Socorro	LINEAR	PAD	4.9 km	MPC · JPL
81355	2000 GT_{52}	—	April 5, 2000	Socorro	LINEAR	·	2.9 km	MPC · JPL
81356	2000 GT_{53}	—	April 5, 2000	Socorro	LINEAR	·	2.3 km	MPC · JPL
81357	2000 GV_{55}	—	April 5, 2000	Socorro	LINEAR	WIT ·	4.5 km	MPC · JPL
81358	2000 GH_{57}	—	April 5, 2000	Socorro	LINEAR	·	3.7 km	MPC · JPL
81359	2000 GR_{57}	—	April 5, 2000	Socorro	LINEAR	EUN	3.4 km	MPC · JPL
81360	2000 GL_{58}	—	April 5, 2000	Socorro	LINEAR	GEF	2.4 km	MPC · JPL
81361	2000 GN_{59}	—	April 5, 2000	Socorro	LINEAR	·	4.5 km	MPC · JPL
81362	2000 GU_{59}	—	April 5, 2000	Socorro	LINEAR	·	2.9 km	MPC · JPL
81363	2000 GO_{60}	—	April 5, 2000	Socorro	LINEAR	·	5.4 km	MPC · JPL
81364	2000 GG_{61}	—	April 5, 2000	Socorro	LINEAR	WIT	1.9 km	MPC · JPL
81365	2000 GX_{61}	—	April 5, 2000	Socorro	LINEAR	·	3.9 km	MPC · JPL
81366	2000 GM_{63}	—	April 5, 2000	Socorro	LINEAR	·	2.9 km	MPC · JPL
81367	2000 GN_{64}	—	April 5, 2000	Socorro	LINEAR	·	3.5 km	MPC · JPL
81368	2000 GR_{64}	—	April 5, 2000	Socorro	LINEAR	AST	4.7 km	MPC · JPL
81369	2000 GT_{64}	—	April 5, 2000	Socorro	LINEAR	·	4.2 km	MPC · JPL
81370	2000 GV_{64}	—	April 5, 2000	Socorro	LINEAR	·	3.5 km	MPC · JPL
81371	2000 GB_{65}	—	April 5, 2000	Socorro	LINEAR	EUN	2.9 km	MPC · JPL
81372	2000 GG_{65}	—	April 5, 2000	Socorro	LINEAR	·	2.9 km	MPC · JPL
81373	2000 GA_{67}	—	April 5, 2000	Socorro	LINEAR	HNS	2.4 km	MPC · JPL
81374	2000 GE_{67}	—	April 5, 2000	Socorro	LINEAR	·	2.9 km	MPC · JPL
81375	2000 GZ_{68}	—	April 5, 2000	Socorro	LINEAR	·	2.6 km	MPC · JPL
81376	2000 GB_{69}	—	April 5, 2000	Socorro	LINEAR	V	1.8 km	MPC · JPL
81377	2000 GG_{69}	—	April 5, 2000	Socorro	LINEAR	EUN	3.9 km	MPC · JPL
81378	2000 GT_{69}	—	April 5, 2000	Socorro	LINEAR	·	3.1 km	MPC · JPL
81379	2000 GO_{70}	—	April 5, 2000	Socorro	LINEAR	slow	3.3 km	MPC · JPL
81380	2000 GT_{70}	—	April 5, 2000	Socorro	LINEAR	ADE	5.1 km	MPC · JPL
81381	2000 GJ_{71}	—	April 5, 2000	Socorro	LINEAR	·	2.7 km	MPC · JPL
81382	2000 GO_{71}	—	April 5, 2000	Socorro	LINEAR	DOR	6.9 km	MPC · JPL
81383	2000 GP_{71}	—	April 5, 2000	Socorro	LINEAR	EUN	3.4 km	MPC · JPL
81384	2000 GU_{71}	—	April 5, 2000	Socorro	LINEAR	·	2.3 km	MPC · JPL
81385	2000 GM_{72}	—	April 5, 2000	Socorro	LINEAR	·	3.0 km	MPC · JPL
81386	2000 GT_{73}	—	April 5, 2000	Socorro	LINEAR	HNS	3.0 km	MPC · JPL
81387	2000 GD_{75}	—	April 5, 2000	Socorro	LINEAR	·	4.0 km	MPC · JPL
81388	2000 GG_{75}	—	April 5, 2000	Socorro	LINEAR	·	3.8 km	MPC · JPL
81389	2000 GR_{78}	—	April 5, 2000	Socorro	LINEAR	·	2.8 km	MPC · JPL
81390	2000 GB_{79}	—	April 5, 2000	Socorro	LINEAR	·	2.8 km	MPC · JPL
81391	2000 GP_{79}	—	April 5, 2000	Socorro	LINEAR	·	5.3 km	MPC · JPL
81392	2000 GH_{81}	—	April 6, 2000	Socorro	LINEAR	·	3.2 km	MPC · JPL
81393	2000 GL_{81}	—	April 6, 2000	Socorro	LINEAR	·	2.3 km	MPC · JPL
81394	2000 GV_{82}	—	April 7, 2000	Haleakala	NEAT	BAR	2.4 km	MPC · JPL
81395	2000 GK_{83}	—	April 3, 2000	Socorro	LINEAR	·	5.0 km	MPC · JPL
81396	2000 GO_{83}	—	April 3, 2000	Socorro	LINEAR	V	1.4 km	MPC · JPL
81397	2000 GZ_{83}	—	April 3, 2000	Socorro	LINEAR	slow	2.9 km	MPC · JPL
81398	2000 GP_{84}	—	April 3, 2000	Socorro	LINEAR	·	4.7 km	MPC · JPL
81399	2000 GY_{84}	—	April 3, 2000	Socorro	LINEAR	·	3.4 km	MPC · JPL
81400	2000 GA_{85}	—	April 3, 2000	Socorro	LINEAR	·	3.4 km	MPC · JPL

== 81401–81500 ==
back to top

Designation			Discovery			Properties		Ref
Permanent	Provisional	Named after	Date	Site	Discoverer(s)	Category	Diam.	Ref
81401	2000 GB_{85}	—	April 3, 2000	Socorro	LINEAR	EUN	2.1 km	MPC · JPL
81402	2000 GC_{85}	—	April 3, 2000	Socorro	LINEAR	MAR	2.6 km	MPC · JPL
81403	2000 GD_{85}	—	April 3, 2000	Socorro	LINEAR	EUN	3.0 km	MPC · JPL
81404	2000 GV_{85}	—	April 3, 2000	Socorro	LINEAR	·	2.8 km	MPC · JPL
81405	2000 GJ_{86}	—	April 4, 2000	Socorro	LINEAR	MAR	3.3 km	MPC · JPL
81406	2000 GL_{86}	—	April 4, 2000	Socorro	LINEAR	·	5.8 km	MPC · JPL
81407	2000 GO_{88}	—	April 4, 2000	Socorro	LINEAR	MAR	2.7 km	MPC · JPL
81408	2000 GU_{88}	—	April 4, 2000	Socorro	LINEAR	V	1.9 km	MPC · JPL
81409	2000 GO_{89}	—	April 4, 2000	Socorro	LINEAR	·	8.4 km	MPC · JPL
81410	2000 GT_{90}	—	April 4, 2000	Socorro	LINEAR	·	3.8 km	MPC · JPL
81411	2000 GT_{91}	—	April 4, 2000	Socorro	LINEAR	·	3.6 km	MPC · JPL
81412	2000 GE_{92}	—	April 4, 2000	Socorro	LINEAR	MAR	3.0 km	MPC · JPL
81413	2000 GF_{95}	—	April 6, 2000	Socorro	LINEAR	·	3.3 km	MPC · JPL
81414	2000 GH_{97}	—	April 7, 2000	Socorro	LINEAR	V	1.7 km	MPC · JPL
81415	2000 GV_{97}	—	April 7, 2000	Socorro	LINEAR	(5)	2.4 km	MPC · JPL
81416	2000 GH_{99}	—	April 7, 2000	Socorro	LINEAR	·	3.4 km	MPC · JPL
81417	2000 GJ_{99}	—	April 7, 2000	Socorro	LINEAR	·	2.9 km	MPC · JPL
81418	2000 GR_{99}	—	April 7, 2000	Socorro	LINEAR	·	3.4 km	MPC · JPL
81419	2000 GJ_{100}	—	April 7, 2000	Socorro	LINEAR	·	3.1 km	MPC · JPL
81420	2000 GQ_{100}	—	April 7, 2000	Socorro	LINEAR	DOR	5.6 km	MPC · JPL
81421	2000 GX_{100}	—	April 7, 2000	Socorro	LINEAR	·	4.0 km	MPC · JPL
81422	2000 GQ_{101}	—	April 7, 2000	Socorro	LINEAR	·	2.7 km	MPC · JPL
81423	2000 GV_{101}	—	April 7, 2000	Socorro	LINEAR	PHO	2.1 km	MPC · JPL
81424	2000 GA_{102}	—	April 7, 2000	Socorro	LINEAR	·	3.3 km	MPC · JPL
81425	2000 GH_{102}	—	April 7, 2000	Socorro	LINEAR	·	2.2 km	MPC · JPL
81426	2000 GS_{103}	—	April 7, 2000	Socorro	LINEAR	·	3.7 km	MPC · JPL
81427	2000 GR_{104}	—	April 7, 2000	Socorro	LINEAR	·	3.2 km	MPC · JPL
81428	2000 GV_{104}	—	April 7, 2000	Socorro	LINEAR	NYS	3.0 km	MPC · JPL
81429	2000 GE_{106}	—	April 7, 2000	Socorro	LINEAR	ADE	8.1 km	MPC · JPL
81430	2000 GM_{106}	—	April 7, 2000	Socorro	LINEAR	·	3.3 km	MPC · JPL
81431	2000 GU_{106}	—	April 7, 2000	Socorro	LINEAR	GEF	3.2 km	MPC · JPL
81432	2000 GL_{107}	—	April 7, 2000	Socorro	LINEAR	GEF	3.2 km	MPC · JPL
81433	2000 GC_{108}	—	April 7, 2000	Socorro	LINEAR	·	4.7 km	MPC · JPL
81434	2000 GR_{109}	—	April 2, 2000	Anderson Mesa	LONEOS	·	3.1 km	MPC · JPL
81435	2000 GS_{109}	—	April 2, 2000	Anderson Mesa	LONEOS	·	2.9 km	MPC · JPL
81436	2000 GC_{110}	—	April 2, 2000	Anderson Mesa	LONEOS	RAF	1.8 km	MPC · JPL
81437	2000 GL_{110}	—	April 2, 2000	Anderson Mesa	LONEOS	·	2.4 km	MPC · JPL
81438	2000 GZ_{111}	—	April 3, 2000	Anderson Mesa	LONEOS	·	6.2 km	MPC · JPL
81439	2000 GQ_{112}	—	April 4, 2000	Socorro	LINEAR	·	3.3 km	MPC · JPL
81440	2000 GU_{112}	—	April 5, 2000	Socorro	LINEAR	JUN	4.1 km	MPC · JPL
81441	2000 GA_{114}	—	April 7, 2000	Socorro	LINEAR	MRX	2.5 km	MPC · JPL
81442	2000 GO_{114}	—	April 7, 2000	Socorro	LINEAR	PAD	5.7 km	MPC · JPL
81443	2000 GV_{114}	—	April 7, 2000	Socorro	LINEAR	·	2.9 km	MPC · JPL
81444	2000 GR_{117}	—	April 2, 2000	Kitt Peak	Spacewatch	·	2.1 km	MPC · JPL
81445	2000 GJ_{121}	—	April 6, 2000	Kitt Peak	Spacewatch	·	3.3 km	MPC · JPL
81446	2000 GH_{123}	—	April 7, 2000	Socorro	LINEAR	·	4.1 km	MPC · JPL
81447	2000 GJ_{123}	—	April 7, 2000	Socorro	LINEAR	·	3.5 km	MPC · JPL
81448	2000 GV_{123}	—	April 7, 2000	Socorro	LINEAR	·	3.2 km	MPC · JPL
81449	2000 GJ_{124}	—	April 7, 2000	Socorro	LINEAR	·	3.7 km	MPC · JPL
81450	2000 GD_{125}	—	April 7, 2000	Socorro	LINEAR	·	4.3 km	MPC · JPL
81451	2000 GG_{125}	—	April 7, 2000	Socorro	LINEAR	·	2.5 km	MPC · JPL
81452	2000 GQ_{125}	—	April 7, 2000	Socorro	LINEAR	·	3.9 km	MPC · JPL
81453	2000 GN_{126}	—	April 7, 2000	Socorro	LINEAR	EUN	3.8 km	MPC · JPL
81454	2000 GW_{126}	—	April 7, 2000	Socorro	LINEAR	·	4.2 km	MPC · JPL
81455	2000 GS_{127}	—	April 6, 2000	Kitt Peak	Spacewatch	·	5.9 km	MPC · JPL
81456	2000 GZ_{128}	—	April 5, 2000	Kitt Peak	Spacewatch	·	3.9 km	MPC · JPL
81457	2000 GF_{130}	—	April 5, 2000	Kitt Peak	Spacewatch	·	3.6 km	MPC · JPL
81458	2000 GL_{131}	—	April 7, 2000	Kitt Peak	Spacewatch	·	2.6 km	MPC · JPL
81459	2000 GE_{132}	—	April 10, 2000	Kitt Peak	Spacewatch	·	5.3 km	MPC · JPL
81460	2000 GK_{133}	—	April 7, 2000	Socorro	LINEAR	·	2.8 km	MPC · JPL
81461	2000 GV_{134}	—	April 8, 2000	Socorro	LINEAR	·	3.6 km	MPC · JPL
81462	2000 GW_{134}	—	April 8, 2000	Socorro	LINEAR	DOR	6.0 km	MPC · JPL
81463	2000 GA_{135}	—	April 8, 2000	Socorro	LINEAR	·	4.4 km	MPC · JPL
81464	2000 GF_{135}	—	April 8, 2000	Socorro	LINEAR	·	3.9 km	MPC · JPL
81465	2000 GN_{136}	—	April 12, 2000	Socorro	LINEAR	EUN	3.9 km	MPC · JPL
81466	2000 GC_{137}	—	April 12, 2000	Socorro	LINEAR	·	2.9 km	MPC · JPL
81467	2000 GH_{137}	—	April 12, 2000	Socorro	LINEAR	EUN	3.0 km	MPC · JPL
81468	2000 GS_{137}	—	April 4, 2000	Anderson Mesa	LONEOS	MAR	3.3 km	MPC · JPL
81469	2000 GU_{137}	—	April 4, 2000	Anderson Mesa	LONEOS	MAR	3.1 km	MPC · JPL
81470	2000 GX_{137}	—	April 4, 2000	Anderson Mesa	LONEOS	·	4.1 km	MPC · JPL
81471	2000 GY_{138}	—	April 4, 2000	Anderson Mesa	LONEOS	·	4.6 km	MPC · JPL
81472	2000 GE_{139}	—	April 4, 2000	Anderson Mesa	LONEOS	·	2.7 km	MPC · JPL
81473	2000 GS_{139}	—	April 4, 2000	Anderson Mesa	LONEOS	MAR	2.4 km	MPC · JPL
81474	2000 GE_{141}	—	April 6, 2000	Anderson Mesa	LONEOS	·	2.4 km	MPC · JPL
81475	2000 GG_{141}	—	April 7, 2000	Anderson Mesa	LONEOS	ADE	5.0 km	MPC · JPL
81476	2000 GH_{141}	—	April 7, 2000	Anderson Mesa	LONEOS	·	2.9 km	MPC · JPL
81477	2000 GU_{141}	—	April 7, 2000	Anderson Mesa	LONEOS	·	2.8 km	MPC · JPL
81478	2000 GF_{142}	—	April 7, 2000	Anderson Mesa	LONEOS	·	4.8 km	MPC · JPL
81479	2000 GX_{142}	—	April 7, 2000	Anderson Mesa	LONEOS	·	3.8 km	MPC · JPL
81480	2000 GH_{143}	—	April 7, 2000	Anderson Mesa	LONEOS	·	3.2 km	MPC · JPL
81481	2000 GF_{146}	—	April 12, 2000	Kitt Peak	Spacewatch	·	2.4 km	MPC · JPL
81482	2000 GN_{148}	—	April 5, 2000	Socorro	LINEAR	·	5.5 km	MPC · JPL
81483	2000 GB_{153}	—	April 6, 2000	Anderson Mesa	LONEOS	·	2.2 km	MPC · JPL
81484	2000 GF_{153}	—	April 6, 2000	Anderson Mesa	LONEOS	·	3.6 km	MPC · JPL
81485	2000 GN_{153}	—	April 6, 2000	Anderson Mesa	LONEOS	·	7.5 km	MPC · JPL
81486	2000 GA_{154}	—	April 6, 2000	Anderson Mesa	LONEOS	·	4.0 km	MPC · JPL
81487	2000 GV_{154}	—	April 6, 2000	Anderson Mesa	LONEOS	·	6.1 km	MPC · JPL
81488	2000 GC_{155}	—	April 6, 2000	Anderson Mesa	LONEOS	·	4.3 km	MPC · JPL
81489	2000 GM_{155}	—	April 6, 2000	Socorro	LINEAR	·	3.1 km	MPC · JPL
81490	2000 GP_{155}	—	April 6, 2000	Anderson Mesa	LONEOS	·	2.1 km	MPC · JPL
81491	2000 GB_{156}	—	April 6, 2000	Anderson Mesa	LONEOS	·	3.9 km	MPC · JPL
81492	2000 GK_{157}	—	April 7, 2000	Socorro	LINEAR	·	3.5 km	MPC · JPL
81493	2000 GE_{158}	—	April 7, 2000	Anderson Mesa	LONEOS	·	2.2 km	MPC · JPL
81494	2000 GT_{158}	—	April 7, 2000	Socorro	LINEAR	·	3.6 km	MPC · JPL
81495	2000 GU_{158}	—	April 7, 2000	Anderson Mesa	LONEOS	EUN	2.0 km	MPC · JPL
81496	2000 GH_{159}	—	April 7, 2000	Socorro	LINEAR	·	3.0 km	MPC · JPL
81497	2000 GN_{159}	—	April 7, 2000	Socorro	LINEAR	V	1.9 km	MPC · JPL
81498	2000 GO_{159}	—	April 7, 2000	Socorro	LINEAR	·	4.4 km	MPC · JPL
81499	2000 GD_{160}	—	April 7, 2000	Socorro	LINEAR	·	5.4 km	MPC · JPL
81500	2000 GO_{160}	—	April 7, 2000	Socorro	LINEAR	NEM	5.7 km	MPC · JPL

== 81501–81600 ==
back to top

Designation			Discovery			Properties		Ref
Permanent	Provisional	Named after	Date	Site	Discoverer(s)	Category	Diam.	Ref
81501	2000 GT_{162}	—	April 8, 2000	Socorro	LINEAR	·	5.7 km	MPC · JPL
81502	2000 GX_{162}	—	April 8, 2000	Socorro	LINEAR	·	2.7 km	MPC · JPL
81503	2000 GD_{163}	—	April 9, 2000	Anderson Mesa	LONEOS	·	3.6 km	MPC · JPL
81504	2000 GE_{163}	—	April 9, 2000	Anderson Mesa	LONEOS	EUN	2.3 km	MPC · JPL
81505	2000 GU_{163}	—	April 12, 2000	Socorro	LINEAR	(194)	5.3 km	MPC · JPL
81506	2000 GW_{163}	—	April 12, 2000	Socorro	LINEAR	·	6.1 km	MPC · JPL
81507	2000 GA_{165}	—	April 5, 2000	Socorro	LINEAR	·	4.2 km	MPC · JPL
81508	2000 GL_{166}	—	April 5, 2000	Socorro	LINEAR	AST	3.4 km	MPC · JPL
81509	2000 GU_{167}	—	April 4, 2000	Anderson Mesa	LONEOS	·	3.6 km	MPC · JPL
81510	2000 GD_{169}	—	April 4, 2000	Anderson Mesa	LONEOS	·	3.1 km	MPC · JPL
81511	2000 GL_{172}	—	April 2, 2000	Anderson Mesa	LONEOS	(5)	3.1 km	MPC · JPL
81512	2000 GL_{174}	—	April 5, 2000	Anderson Mesa	LONEOS	·	3.2 km	MPC · JPL
81513	2000 GN_{174}	—	April 5, 2000	Anderson Mesa	LONEOS	NYS	2.5 km	MPC · JPL
81514	2000 GY_{177}	—	April 2, 2000	Anderson Mesa	LONEOS	·	5.7 km	MPC · JPL
81515	2000 GP_{178}	—	April 2, 2000	Anderson Mesa	LONEOS	·	3.5 km	MPC · JPL
81516	2000 GA_{179}	—	April 4, 2000	Socorro	LINEAR	JUN	1.7 km	MPC · JPL
81517	2000 GD_{186}	—	April 5, 2000	Socorro	LINEAR	·	4.1 km	MPC · JPL
81518	2000 HW_{2}	—	April 25, 2000	Kitt Peak	Spacewatch	·	2.8 km	MPC · JPL
81519	2000 HQ_{6}	—	April 24, 2000	Kitt Peak	Spacewatch	·	2.8 km	MPC · JPL
81520	2000 HY_{6}	—	April 24, 2000	Kitt Peak	Spacewatch	·	4.3 km	MPC · JPL
81521	2000 HK_{7}	—	April 28, 2000	Kitt Peak	Spacewatch	AGN	2.2 km	MPC · JPL
81522	2000 HW_{7}	—	April 27, 2000	Socorro	LINEAR	HOF	6.8 km	MPC · JPL
81523	2000 HC_{8}	—	April 27, 2000	Socorro	LINEAR	(5)	2.3 km	MPC · JPL
81524	2000 HL_{8}	—	April 27, 2000	Socorro	LINEAR	·	3.9 km	MPC · JPL
81525	2000 HL_{9}	—	April 27, 2000	Socorro	LINEAR	·	4.8 km	MPC · JPL
81526	2000 HA_{10}	—	April 27, 2000	Socorro	LINEAR	·	3.4 km	MPC · JPL
81527	2000 HM_{10}	—	April 27, 2000	Socorro	LINEAR	·	2.8 km	MPC · JPL
81528	2000 HU_{10}	—	April 27, 2000	Socorro	LINEAR	(5)	2.8 km	MPC · JPL
81529	2000 HV_{12}	—	April 28, 2000	Socorro	LINEAR	·	2.9 km	MPC · JPL
81530	2000 HD_{14}	—	April 28, 2000	Socorro	LINEAR	·	3.4 km	MPC · JPL
81531	2000 HK_{14}	—	April 29, 2000	Baton Rouge	W. R. Cooney Jr., Hess, M.	·	4.7 km	MPC · JPL
81532	2000 HE_{15}	—	April 29, 2000	Socorro	LINEAR	·	4.0 km	MPC · JPL
81533	2000 HG_{15}	—	April 27, 2000	Socorro	LINEAR	·	2.5 km	MPC · JPL
81534	2000 HM_{15}	—	April 27, 2000	Socorro	LINEAR	·	2.4 km	MPC · JPL
81535	2000 HZ_{15}	—	April 29, 2000	Socorro	LINEAR	·	3.8 km	MPC · JPL
81536	2000 HJ_{16}	—	April 24, 2000	Kitt Peak	Spacewatch	·	2.2 km	MPC · JPL
81537	2000 HZ_{16}	—	April 24, 2000	Kitt Peak	Spacewatch	ADE	6.5 km	MPC · JPL
81538	2000 HL_{17}	—	April 24, 2000	Kitt Peak	Spacewatch	·	4.3 km	MPC · JPL
81539	2000 HQ_{18}	—	April 25, 2000	Kitt Peak	Spacewatch	·	2.4 km	MPC · JPL
81540	2000 HK_{19}	—	April 25, 2000	Kitt Peak	Spacewatch	·	4.9 km	MPC · JPL
81541	2000 HW_{20}	—	April 27, 2000	Socorro	LINEAR	·	3.0 km	MPC · JPL
81542	2000 HC_{21}	—	April 27, 2000	Socorro	LINEAR	·	4.3 km	MPC · JPL
81543	2000 HX_{21}	—	April 28, 2000	Socorro	LINEAR	DOR	8.2 km	MPC · JPL
81544	2000 HL_{22}	—	April 29, 2000	Socorro	LINEAR	·	3.1 km	MPC · JPL
81545	2000 HM_{22}	—	April 29, 2000	Socorro	LINEAR	·	2.6 km	MPC · JPL
81546	2000 HQ_{22}	—	April 29, 2000	Socorro	LINEAR	·	2.7 km	MPC · JPL
81547	2000 HW_{22}	—	April 30, 2000	Socorro	LINEAR	·	2.6 km	MPC · JPL
81548	2000 HA_{23}	—	April 30, 2000	Socorro	LINEAR	·	2.8 km	MPC · JPL
81549	2000 HJ_{23}	—	April 30, 2000	Socorro	LINEAR	·	3.9 km	MPC · JPL
81550	2000 HU_{23}	—	April 26, 2000	Višnjan Observatory	K. Korlević	(1547)	7.2 km	MPC · JPL
81551	2000 HC_{25}	—	April 24, 2000	Anderson Mesa	LONEOS	(5)	2.8 km	MPC · JPL
81552	2000 HH_{25}	—	April 24, 2000	Anderson Mesa	LONEOS	KOR	2.7 km	MPC · JPL
81553	2000 HO_{25}	—	April 24, 2000	Anderson Mesa	LONEOS	(5)	3.4 km	MPC · JPL
81554	2000 HA_{26}	—	April 24, 2000	Anderson Mesa	LONEOS	·	2.9 km	MPC · JPL
81555	2000 HH_{26}	—	April 24, 2000	Anderson Mesa	LONEOS	·	2.7 km	MPC · JPL
81556	2000 HR_{26}	—	April 24, 2000	Anderson Mesa	LONEOS	AGN	2.7 km	MPC · JPL
81557	2000 HJ_{28}	—	April 29, 2000	Socorro	LINEAR	HNS	3.3 km	MPC · JPL
81558	2000 HM_{29}	—	April 28, 2000	Socorro	LINEAR	EUN	3.9 km	MPC · JPL
81559	2000 HO_{29}	—	April 28, 2000	Socorro	LINEAR	·	3.8 km	MPC · JPL
81560	2000 HZ_{29}	—	April 28, 2000	Socorro	LINEAR	slow	3.3 km	MPC · JPL
81561	2000 HJ_{30}	—	April 28, 2000	Socorro	LINEAR	·	4.5 km	MPC · JPL
81562	2000 HN_{30}	—	April 28, 2000	Socorro	LINEAR	·	3.4 km	MPC · JPL
81563	2000 HO_{30}	—	April 28, 2000	Socorro	LINEAR	EUN	2.8 km	MPC · JPL
81564	2000 HT_{31}	—	April 29, 2000	Socorro	LINEAR	·	4.1 km	MPC · JPL
81565	2000 HS_{32}	—	April 29, 2000	Socorro	LINEAR	KOR	3.3 km	MPC · JPL
81566	2000 HG_{33}	—	April 29, 2000	Socorro	LINEAR	HNS	3.5 km	MPC · JPL
81567	2000 HH_{33}	—	April 29, 2000	Socorro	LINEAR	MAR	2.4 km	MPC · JPL
81568	2000 HL_{34}	—	April 25, 2000	Anderson Mesa	LONEOS	·	2.6 km	MPC · JPL
81569	2000 HD_{35}	—	April 27, 2000	Socorro	LINEAR	EUN	2.6 km	MPC · JPL
81570	2000 HG_{36}	—	April 28, 2000	Socorro	LINEAR	MAR	3.0 km	MPC · JPL
81571	2000 HQ_{36}	—	April 28, 2000	Socorro	LINEAR	·	4.2 km	MPC · JPL
81572	2000 HM_{37}	—	April 28, 2000	Socorro	LINEAR	EUN	3.0 km	MPC · JPL
81573	2000 HS_{37}	—	April 29, 2000	Socorro	LINEAR	·	3.2 km	MPC · JPL
81574	2000 HV_{39}	—	April 30, 2000	Kitt Peak	Spacewatch	·	3.2 km	MPC · JPL
81575	2000 HL_{40}	—	April 30, 2000	Kitt Peak	Spacewatch	·	7.6 km	MPC · JPL
81576	2000 HZ_{40}	—	April 28, 2000	Socorro	LINEAR	·	4.4 km	MPC · JPL
81577	2000 HQ_{41}	—	April 28, 2000	Socorro	LINEAR	·	3.8 km	MPC · JPL
81578	2000 HD_{42}	—	April 29, 2000	Socorro	LINEAR	EUN ·	6.0 km	MPC · JPL
81579	2000 HA_{43}	—	April 29, 2000	Socorro	LINEAR	·	3.4 km	MPC · JPL
81580	2000 HP_{44}	—	April 26, 2000	Anderson Mesa	LONEOS	EUN	2.3 km	MPC · JPL
81581	2000 HR_{44}	—	April 26, 2000	Anderson Mesa	LONEOS	WIT	2.2 km	MPC · JPL
81582	2000 HZ_{45}	—	April 27, 2000	Socorro	LINEAR	HNS	2.4 km	MPC · JPL
81583	2000 HD_{46}	—	April 29, 2000	Socorro	LINEAR	·	3.4 km	MPC · JPL
81584	2000 HF_{46}	—	April 29, 2000	Socorro	LINEAR	·	2.8 km	MPC · JPL
81585	2000 HW_{47}	—	April 29, 2000	Socorro	LINEAR	·	6.8 km	MPC · JPL
81586	2000 HE_{48}	—	April 29, 2000	Socorro	LINEAR	·	6.1 km	MPC · JPL
81587	2000 HC_{49}	—	April 29, 2000	Socorro	LINEAR	KOR	2.6 km	MPC · JPL
81588	2000 HK_{49}	—	April 29, 2000	Socorro	LINEAR	MAR	3.4 km	MPC · JPL
81589	2000 HM_{49}	—	April 29, 2000	Socorro	LINEAR	THM	6.5 km	MPC · JPL
81590	2000 HN_{49}	—	April 29, 2000	Socorro	LINEAR	·	4.0 km	MPC · JPL
81591	2000 HJ_{50}	—	April 29, 2000	Socorro	LINEAR	·	3.3 km	MPC · JPL
81592	2000 HU_{50}	—	April 29, 2000	Socorro	LINEAR	·	4.0 km	MPC · JPL
81593	2000 HC_{52}	—	April 29, 2000	Socorro	LINEAR	GEF	2.7 km	MPC · JPL
81594	2000 HD_{53}	—	April 29, 2000	Socorro	LINEAR	MAR	2.0 km	MPC · JPL
81595	2000 HP_{54}	—	April 29, 2000	Socorro	LINEAR	·	6.0 km	MPC · JPL
81596	2000 HQ_{54}	—	April 29, 2000	Socorro	LINEAR	·	6.0 km	MPC · JPL
81597	2000 HX_{54}	—	April 29, 2000	Socorro	LINEAR	·	3.6 km	MPC · JPL
81598	2000 HJ_{55}	—	April 30, 2000	Socorro	LINEAR	·	2.3 km	MPC · JPL
81599	2000 HR_{56}	—	April 24, 2000	Anderson Mesa	LONEOS	·	2.6 km	MPC · JPL
81600	2000 HW_{56}	—	April 24, 2000	Anderson Mesa	LONEOS	·	3.9 km	MPC · JPL

== 81601–81700 ==
back to top

Designation			Discovery			Properties		Ref
Permanent	Provisional	Named after	Date	Site	Discoverer(s)	Category	Diam.	Ref
81601	2000 HQ_{58}	—	April 25, 2000	Anderson Mesa	LONEOS	·	2.2 km	MPC · JPL
81602	2000 HZ_{60}	—	April 25, 2000	Anderson Mesa	LONEOS	·	2.8 km	MPC · JPL
81603	2000 HF_{61}	—	April 25, 2000	Anderson Mesa	LONEOS	·	3.0 km	MPC · JPL
81604	2000 HG_{63}	—	April 26, 2000	Anderson Mesa	LONEOS	·	3.7 km	MPC · JPL
81605	2000 HS_{64}	—	April 26, 2000	Anderson Mesa	LONEOS	·	4.9 km	MPC · JPL
81606	2000 HU_{64}	—	April 26, 2000	Anderson Mesa	LONEOS	·	2.4 km	MPC · JPL
81607	2000 HX_{64}	—	April 26, 2000	Anderson Mesa	LONEOS	·	4.0 km	MPC · JPL
81608	2000 HF_{65}	—	April 26, 2000	Anderson Mesa	LONEOS	·	2.6 km	MPC · JPL
81609	2000 HS_{65}	—	April 26, 2000	Anderson Mesa	LONEOS	HOF	7.1 km	MPC · JPL
81610	2000 HT_{65}	—	April 26, 2000	Anderson Mesa	LONEOS	·	3.1 km	MPC · JPL
81611	2000 HM_{66}	—	April 26, 2000	Anderson Mesa	LONEOS	GEF	4.2 km	MPC · JPL
81612	2000 HM_{67}	—	April 27, 2000	Kitt Peak	Spacewatch	(12739)	2.8 km	MPC · JPL
81613	2000 HE_{69}	—	April 24, 2000	Anderson Mesa	LONEOS	AGN	2.8 km	MPC · JPL
81614	2000 HS_{69}	—	April 26, 2000	Anderson Mesa	LONEOS	·	7.9 km	MPC · JPL
81615	2000 HQ_{70}	—	April 26, 2000	Anderson Mesa	LONEOS	·	3.5 km	MPC · JPL
81616	2000 HW_{70}	—	April 26, 2000	Anderson Mesa	LONEOS	·	7.1 km	MPC · JPL
81617	2000 HZ_{70}	—	April 26, 2000	Anderson Mesa	LONEOS	(5)	3.3 km	MPC · JPL
81618	2000 HP_{71}	—	April 25, 2000	Anderson Mesa	LONEOS	(5)	3.8 km	MPC · JPL
81619	2000 HW_{72}	—	April 27, 2000	Anderson Mesa	LONEOS	·	3.5 km	MPC · JPL
81620	2000 HX_{72}	—	April 27, 2000	Anderson Mesa	LONEOS	·	5.0 km	MPC · JPL
81621	2000 HF_{73}	—	April 27, 2000	Anderson Mesa	LONEOS	EUN	2.1 km	MPC · JPL
81622	2000 HR_{73}	—	April 27, 2000	Anderson Mesa	LONEOS	·	3.0 km	MPC · JPL
81623	2000 HY_{73}	—	April 27, 2000	Anderson Mesa	LONEOS	·	3.9 km	MPC · JPL
81624	2000 HW_{74}	—	April 27, 2000	Socorro	LINEAR	EOS	4.0 km	MPC · JPL
81625	2000 HA_{75}	—	April 27, 2000	Socorro	LINEAR	·	9.8 km	MPC · JPL
81626	2000 HP_{75}	—	April 27, 2000	Socorro	LINEAR	·	3.3 km	MPC · JPL
81627	2000 HW_{75}	—	April 27, 2000	Socorro	LINEAR	EOS	5.0 km	MPC · JPL
81628	2000 HF_{76}	—	April 27, 2000	Socorro	LINEAR	DOR	6.7 km	MPC · JPL
81629	2000 HO_{76}	—	April 27, 2000	Socorro	LINEAR	·	3.5 km	MPC · JPL
81630	2000 HT_{76}	—	April 27, 2000	Socorro	LINEAR	·	3.0 km	MPC · JPL
81631	2000 HD_{77}	—	April 27, 2000	Socorro	LINEAR	·	5.2 km	MPC · JPL
81632	2000 HE_{77}	—	April 27, 2000	Socorro	LINEAR	·	3.1 km	MPC · JPL
81633	2000 HH_{77}	—	April 28, 2000	Anderson Mesa	LONEOS	slow	4.0 km	MPC · JPL
81634	2000 HN_{77}	—	April 28, 2000	Anderson Mesa	LONEOS	MAR	3.2 km	MPC · JPL
81635	2000 HQ_{77}	—	April 28, 2000	Anderson Mesa	LONEOS	·	6.5 km	MPC · JPL
81636	2000 HP_{78}	—	April 28, 2000	Anderson Mesa	LONEOS	HNS	2.1 km	MPC · JPL
81637	2000 HW_{78}	—	April 28, 2000	Anderson Mesa	LONEOS	·	2.9 km	MPC · JPL
81638	2000 HX_{78}	—	April 28, 2000	Anderson Mesa	LONEOS	PHO	2.8 km	MPC · JPL
81639	2000 HA_{79}	—	April 28, 2000	Anderson Mesa	LONEOS	EUN	4.7 km	MPC · JPL
81640	2000 HX_{79}	—	April 28, 2000	Anderson Mesa	LONEOS	·	3.4 km	MPC · JPL
81641	2000 HA_{80}	—	April 28, 2000	Anderson Mesa	LONEOS	EUN	3.4 km	MPC · JPL
81642	2000 HD_{80}	—	April 28, 2000	Anderson Mesa	LONEOS	EUN	3.0 km	MPC · JPL
81643	2000 HP_{80}	—	April 28, 2000	Anderson Mesa	LONEOS	·	7.5 km	MPC · JPL
81644	2000 HY_{80}	—	April 28, 2000	Anderson Mesa	LONEOS	·	8.7 km	MPC · JPL
81645	2000 HY_{81}	—	April 29, 2000	Socorro	LINEAR	KOR	3.5 km	MPC · JPL
81646	2000 HK_{82}	—	April 29, 2000	Socorro	LINEAR	·	4.0 km	MPC · JPL
81647	2000 HT_{83}	—	April 30, 2000	Anderson Mesa	LONEOS	·	3.3 km	MPC · JPL
81648	2000 HU_{83}	—	April 30, 2000	Anderson Mesa	LONEOS	·	3.2 km	MPC · JPL
81649	2000 HW_{83}	—	April 30, 2000	Anderson Mesa	LONEOS	·	4.1 km	MPC · JPL
81650	2000 HH_{84}	—	April 30, 2000	Socorro	LINEAR	PHO	2.8 km	MPC · JPL
81651	2000 HT_{84}	—	April 30, 2000	Haleakala	NEAT	·	3.2 km	MPC · JPL
81652	2000 HY_{84}	—	April 30, 2000	Haleakala	NEAT	·	4.4 km	MPC · JPL
81653	2000 HJ_{85}	—	April 30, 2000	Anderson Mesa	LONEOS	(5)	3.0 km	MPC · JPL
81654	2000 HO_{86}	—	April 30, 2000	Anderson Mesa	LONEOS	·	5.0 km	MPC · JPL
81655	2000 HS_{86}	—	April 30, 2000	Anderson Mesa	LONEOS	EOS	4.8 km	MPC · JPL
81656	2000 HU_{86}	—	April 30, 2000	Anderson Mesa	LONEOS	HOF	5.6 km	MPC · JPL
81657	2000 HD_{87}	—	April 30, 2000	Kitt Peak	Spacewatch	MAR	2.2 km	MPC · JPL
81658	2000 HO_{87}	—	April 27, 2000	Socorro	LINEAR	·	2.7 km	MPC · JPL
81659	2000 HS_{87}	—	April 27, 2000	Socorro	LINEAR	·	2.5 km	MPC · JPL
81660	2000 HR_{88}	—	April 28, 2000	Socorro	LINEAR	GEF	2.6 km	MPC · JPL
81661	2000 HM_{89}	—	April 29, 2000	Socorro	LINEAR	·	5.7 km	MPC · JPL
81662	2000 HJ_{90}	—	April 29, 2000	Socorro	LINEAR	·	2.3 km	MPC · JPL
81663	2000 HE_{92}	—	April 29, 2000	Socorro	LINEAR	·	4.9 km	MPC · JPL
81664	2000 HM_{92}	—	April 29, 2000	Socorro	LINEAR	·	3.1 km	MPC · JPL
81665	2000 HQ_{94}	—	April 29, 2000	Socorro	LINEAR	KOR	3.0 km	MPC · JPL
81666	2000 HW_{94}	—	April 29, 2000	Anderson Mesa	LONEOS	HNS	3.2 km	MPC · JPL
81667	2000 HC_{96}	—	April 28, 2000	Socorro	LINEAR	EOS	5.0 km	MPC · JPL
81668	2000 HE_{97}	—	April 27, 2000	Socorro	LINEAR	·	2.7 km	MPC · JPL
81669	2000 HD_{99}	—	April 25, 2000	Anderson Mesa	LONEOS	·	2.3 km	MPC · JPL
81670	2000 HX_{102}	—	April 27, 2000	Anderson Mesa	LONEOS	·	2.8 km	MPC · JPL
81671	2000 HD_{103}	—	April 27, 2000	Anderson Mesa	LONEOS	·	2.8 km	MPC · JPL
81672	2000 HY_{103}	—	April 27, 2000	Anderson Mesa	LONEOS	MAR	3.2 km	MPC · JPL
81673	2000 HA_{105}	—	April 24, 2000	Kitt Peak	Spacewatch	·	5.4 km	MPC · JPL
81674	2000 JC	—	May 2, 2000	Prescott	P. G. Comba	·	3.3 km	MPC · JPL
81675	2000 JO	—	May 1, 2000	Socorro	LINEAR	·	6.4 km	MPC · JPL
81676	2000 JB_{1}	—	May 1, 2000	Socorro	LINEAR	·	3.1 km	MPC · JPL
81677	2000 JW_{1}	—	May 2, 2000	Socorro	LINEAR	·	2.9 km	MPC · JPL
81678	2000 JX_{2}	—	May 3, 2000	Socorro	LINEAR	EUN	2.7 km	MPC · JPL
81679	2000 JB_{4}	—	May 4, 2000	Prescott	P. G. Comba	MRX	2.5 km	MPC · JPL
81680	2000 JS_{4}	—	May 1, 2000	Kitt Peak	Spacewatch	·	4.0 km	MPC · JPL
81681	2000 JQ_{5}	—	May 1, 2000	Socorro	LINEAR	·	3.6 km	MPC · JPL
81682	2000 JA_{6}	—	May 2, 2000	Socorro	LINEAR	·	4.4 km	MPC · JPL
81683	2000 JV_{6}	—	May 4, 2000	Socorro	LINEAR	·	6.1 km	MPC · JPL
81684	2000 JJ_{7}	—	May 6, 2000	Bergisch Gladbach	W. Bickel	·	3.4 km	MPC · JPL
81685	2000 JH_{9}	—	May 3, 2000	Socorro	LINEAR	·	4.1 km	MPC · JPL
81686	2000 JM_{9}	—	May 3, 2000	Socorro	LINEAR	·	7.3 km	MPC · JPL
81687	2000 JU_{9}	—	May 4, 2000	Socorro	LINEAR	GEF	2.4 km	MPC · JPL
81688	2000 JF_{11}	—	May 3, 2000	Socorro	LINEAR	·	4.1 km	MPC · JPL
81689	2000 JX_{11}	—	May 5, 2000	Socorro	LINEAR	·	2.3 km	MPC · JPL
81690	2000 JJ_{12}	—	May 5, 2000	Socorro	LINEAR	·	3.1 km	MPC · JPL
81691	2000 JD_{14}	—	May 6, 2000	Socorro	LINEAR	·	5.6 km	MPC · JPL
81692	2000 JN_{14}	—	May 6, 2000	Socorro	LINEAR	EUN	3.5 km	MPC · JPL
81693	2000 JU_{14}	—	May 6, 2000	Socorro	LINEAR	THM	9.1 km	MPC · JPL
81694	2000 JT_{15}	—	May 3, 2000	Socorro	LINEAR	EUN	3.1 km	MPC · JPL
81695	2000 JU_{15}	—	May 4, 2000	Socorro	LINEAR	·	4.4 km	MPC · JPL
81696	2000 JC_{17}	—	May 5, 2000	Socorro	LINEAR	·	2.9 km	MPC · JPL
81697	2000 JD_{17}	—	May 5, 2000	Socorro	LINEAR	·	2.4 km	MPC · JPL
81698	2000 JG_{17}	—	May 5, 2000	Socorro	LINEAR	JUN	3.0 km	MPC · JPL
81699	2000 JY_{17}	—	May 6, 2000	Socorro	LINEAR	·	2.4 km	MPC · JPL
81700	2000 JU_{19}	—	May 6, 2000	Socorro	LINEAR	EUN	4.2 km	MPC · JPL

== 81701–81800 ==
back to top

Designation			Discovery			Properties		Ref
Permanent	Provisional	Named after	Date	Site	Discoverer(s)	Category	Diam.	Ref
81701	2000 JX_{19}	—	May 6, 2000	Socorro	LINEAR	·	2.7 km	MPC · JPL
81702	2000 JZ_{19}	—	May 6, 2000	Socorro	LINEAR	·	4.1 km	MPC · JPL
81703	2000 JO_{20}	—	May 6, 2000	Socorro	LINEAR	·	3.1 km	MPC · JPL
81704	2000 JS_{20}	—	May 6, 2000	Socorro	LINEAR	GEF	2.7 km	MPC · JPL
81705	2000 JT_{21}	—	May 6, 2000	Socorro	LINEAR	·	3.8 km	MPC · JPL
81706	2000 JC_{22}	—	May 6, 2000	Socorro	LINEAR	·	4.0 km	MPC · JPL
81707	2000 JQ_{22}	—	May 6, 2000	Socorro	LINEAR	·	4.3 km	MPC · JPL
81708	2000 JZ_{22}	—	May 7, 2000	Socorro	LINEAR	·	4.9 km	MPC · JPL
81709	2000 JY_{23}	—	May 7, 2000	Socorro	LINEAR	·	5.0 km	MPC · JPL
81710	2000 JO_{24}	—	May 7, 2000	Socorro	LINEAR	EUN	2.8 km	MPC · JPL
81711	2000 JC_{25}	—	May 7, 2000	Socorro	LINEAR	·	4.7 km	MPC · JPL
81712	2000 JE_{25}	—	May 7, 2000	Socorro	LINEAR	MAR	3.1 km	MPC · JPL
81713	2000 JC_{27}	—	May 7, 2000	Socorro	LINEAR	·	5.1 km	MPC · JPL
81714	2000 JU_{27}	—	May 7, 2000	Socorro	LINEAR	·	2.6 km	MPC · JPL
81715	2000 JA_{28}	—	May 7, 2000	Socorro	LINEAR	·	3.6 km	MPC · JPL
81716	2000 JP_{28}	—	May 7, 2000	Socorro	LINEAR	·	3.7 km	MPC · JPL
81717	2000 JY_{29}	—	May 7, 2000	Socorro	LINEAR	·	4.2 km	MPC · JPL
81718	2000 JC_{31}	—	May 7, 2000	Socorro	LINEAR	EUN	3.8 km	MPC · JPL
81719	2000 JR_{33}	—	May 7, 2000	Socorro	LINEAR	EUN	2.7 km	MPC · JPL
81720	2000 JW_{33}	—	May 7, 2000	Socorro	LINEAR	·	5.1 km	MPC · JPL
81721	2000 JV_{34}	—	May 7, 2000	Socorro	LINEAR	·	2.6 km	MPC · JPL
81722	2000 JY_{34}	—	May 7, 2000	Socorro	LINEAR	·	6.1 km	MPC · JPL
81723	2000 JP_{35}	—	May 7, 2000	Socorro	LINEAR	·	3.0 km	MPC · JPL
81724	2000 JS_{35}	—	May 7, 2000	Socorro	LINEAR	MAR	2.7 km	MPC · JPL
81725	2000 JV_{35}	—	May 7, 2000	Socorro	LINEAR	KOR	3.7 km	MPC · JPL
81726	2000 JL_{36}	—	May 7, 2000	Socorro	LINEAR	·	5.5 km	MPC · JPL
81727	2000 JO_{36}	—	May 7, 2000	Socorro	LINEAR	·	5.1 km	MPC · JPL
81728	2000 JS_{36}	—	May 7, 2000	Socorro	LINEAR	EOS	7.2 km	MPC · JPL
81729	2000 JH_{37}	—	May 7, 2000	Socorro	LINEAR	·	3.2 km	MPC · JPL
81730	2000 JZ_{37}	—	May 7, 2000	Socorro	LINEAR	TIR	5.9 km	MPC · JPL
81731	2000 JM_{38}	—	May 7, 2000	Socorro	LINEAR	·	3.8 km	MPC · JPL
81732	2000 JZ_{40}	—	May 6, 2000	Socorro	LINEAR	·	3.3 km	MPC · JPL
81733	2000 JH_{41}	—	May 6, 2000	Socorro	LINEAR	·	2.9 km	MPC · JPL
81734	2000 JL_{41}	—	May 7, 2000	Socorro	LINEAR	·	2.9 km	MPC · JPL
81735	2000 JZ_{41}	—	May 7, 2000	Socorro	LINEAR	(12739)	3.1 km	MPC · JPL
81736	2000 JT_{42}	—	May 7, 2000	Socorro	LINEAR	·	2.5 km	MPC · JPL
81737	2000 JV_{43}	—	May 7, 2000	Socorro	LINEAR	·	3.0 km	MPC · JPL
81738	2000 JZ_{43}	—	May 7, 2000	Socorro	LINEAR	·	3.2 km	MPC · JPL
81739	2000 JC_{44}	—	May 7, 2000	Socorro	LINEAR	·	3.0 km	MPC · JPL
81740	2000 JA_{46}	—	May 7, 2000	Socorro	LINEAR	·	3.1 km	MPC · JPL
81741	2000 JP_{46}	—	May 7, 2000	Socorro	LINEAR	·	3.1 km	MPC · JPL
81742	2000 JS_{46}	—	May 9, 2000	Socorro	LINEAR	·	3.6 km	MPC · JPL
81743	2000 JT_{46}	—	May 9, 2000	Socorro	LINEAR	·	4.2 km	MPC · JPL
81744	2000 JK_{47}	—	May 9, 2000	Socorro	LINEAR	·	5.8 km	MPC · JPL
81745	2000 JP_{51}	—	May 9, 2000	Socorro	LINEAR	(5)	2.8 km	MPC · JPL
81746	2000 JH_{52}	—	May 9, 2000	Socorro	LINEAR	·	5.7 km	MPC · JPL
81747	2000 JO_{52}	—	May 9, 2000	Socorro	LINEAR	·	3.5 km	MPC · JPL
81748	2000 JC_{53}	—	May 9, 2000	Socorro	LINEAR	·	3.0 km	MPC · JPL
81749	2000 JX_{53}	—	May 4, 2000	Socorro	LINEAR	·	3.9 km	MPC · JPL
81750	2000 JU_{55}	—	May 6, 2000	Socorro	LINEAR	(13314)	3.0 km	MPC · JPL
81751	2000 JK_{56}	—	May 6, 2000	Socorro	LINEAR	ADE ·	5.5 km	MPC · JPL
81752	2000 JR_{56}	—	May 6, 2000	Socorro	LINEAR	·	2.6 km	MPC · JPL
81753	2000 JZ_{57}	—	May 6, 2000	Socorro	LINEAR	·	5.4 km	MPC · JPL
81754	2000 JW_{58}	—	May 6, 2000	Socorro	LINEAR	EUN	4.0 km	MPC · JPL
81755	2000 JD_{59}	—	May 7, 2000	Socorro	LINEAR	·	6.6 km	MPC · JPL
81756	2000 JM_{59}	—	May 7, 2000	Socorro	LINEAR	·	5.6 km	MPC · JPL
81757	2000 JN_{59}	—	May 7, 2000	Socorro	LINEAR	·	5.8 km	MPC · JPL
81758	2000 JZ_{59}	—	May 7, 2000	Socorro	LINEAR	·	2.4 km	MPC · JPL
81759	2000 JD_{60}	—	May 7, 2000	Socorro	LINEAR	·	3.0 km	MPC · JPL
81760	2000 JG_{60}	—	May 7, 2000	Socorro	LINEAR	·	2.6 km	MPC · JPL
81761	2000 JC_{62}	—	May 7, 2000	Socorro	LINEAR	·	3.5 km	MPC · JPL
81762	2000 JN_{62}	—	May 9, 2000	Socorro	LINEAR	EUN	2.7 km	MPC · JPL
81763	2000 JW_{62}	—	May 9, 2000	Socorro	LINEAR	·	3.2 km	MPC · JPL
81764	2000 JB_{63}	—	May 9, 2000	Socorro	LINEAR	·	3.2 km	MPC · JPL
81765	2000 JG_{63}	—	May 9, 2000	Socorro	LINEAR	·	2.5 km	MPC · JPL
81766	2000 JH_{63}	—	May 9, 2000	Socorro	LINEAR	·	4.7 km	MPC · JPL
81767	2000 JV_{65}	—	May 6, 2000	Socorro	LINEAR	·	5.7 km	MPC · JPL
81768	2000 JY_{67}	—	May 6, 2000	Kitt Peak	Spacewatch	EOS	4.0 km	MPC · JPL
81769	2000 JZ_{67}	—	May 6, 2000	Kitt Peak	Spacewatch	·	2.3 km	MPC · JPL
81770	2000 JG_{68}	—	May 7, 2000	Kitt Peak	Spacewatch	·	2.3 km	MPC · JPL
81771	2000 JM_{68}	—	May 7, 2000	Kitt Peak	Spacewatch	·	4.6 km	MPC · JPL
81772	2000 JN_{68}	—	May 7, 2000	Kitt Peak	Spacewatch	·	4.3 km	MPC · JPL
81773	2000 JV_{69}	—	May 2, 2000	Anderson Mesa	LONEOS	·	3.6 km	MPC · JPL
81774	2000 JB_{70}	—	May 2, 2000	Anderson Mesa	LONEOS	·	2.8 km	MPC · JPL
81775	2000 JV_{70}	—	May 1, 2000	Anderson Mesa	LONEOS	EOS	4.8 km	MPC · JPL
81776	2000 JL_{71}	—	May 1, 2000	Anderson Mesa	LONEOS	·	2.5 km	MPC · JPL
81777	2000 JV_{72}	—	May 2, 2000	Anderson Mesa	LONEOS	·	3.8 km	MPC · JPL
81778	2000 JB_{73}	—	May 2, 2000	Anderson Mesa	LONEOS	GEF	2.5 km	MPC · JPL
81779	2000 JP_{73}	—	May 2, 2000	Anderson Mesa	LONEOS	·	2.3 km	MPC · JPL
81780	2000 JQ_{73}	—	May 2, 2000	Anderson Mesa	LONEOS	(18466)	2.5 km	MPC · JPL
81781	2000 JA_{74}	—	May 2, 2000	Kitt Peak	Spacewatch	·	2.9 km	MPC · JPL
81782	2000 JB_{75}	—	May 5, 2000	Anderson Mesa	LONEOS	EUN	3.2 km	MPC · JPL
81783	2000 JD_{75}	—	May 5, 2000	Anderson Mesa	LONEOS	·	3.5 km	MPC · JPL
81784	2000 JK_{75}	—	May 3, 2000	Socorro	LINEAR	AGN	3.0 km	MPC · JPL
81785	2000 JS_{77}	—	May 9, 2000	Socorro	LINEAR	·	4.5 km	MPC · JPL
81786	2000 JT_{79}	—	May 5, 2000	Socorro	LINEAR	·	5.7 km	MPC · JPL
81787	2000 JW_{79}	—	May 6, 2000	Socorro	LINEAR	·	4.7 km	MPC · JPL
81788	2000 JQ_{81}	—	May 9, 2000	Kitt Peak	Spacewatch	GEF	2.6 km	MPC · JPL
81789	2000 JH_{82}	—	May 7, 2000	Socorro	LINEAR	·	3.3 km	MPC · JPL
81790 Lewislove	2000 JL_{84}	Lewislove	May 2, 2000	Anderson Mesa	Wasserman, L. H.	·	2.8 km	MPC · JPL
81791	2000 JX_{84}	—	May 11, 2000	Anderson Mesa	LONEOS	·	2.0 km	MPC · JPL
81792	2000 JE_{85}	—	May 5, 2000	Socorro	LINEAR	·	4.3 km	MPC · JPL
81793	2000 JK_{85}	—	May 4, 2000	Socorro	LINEAR	·	5.7 km	MPC · JPL
81794	2000 JL_{85}	—	May 3, 2000	Socorro	LINEAR	·	3.0 km	MPC · JPL
81795	2000 JZ_{85}	—	May 2, 2000	Anderson Mesa	LONEOS	·	4.6 km	MPC · JPL
81796	2000 KH	—	May 23, 2000	Prescott	P. G. Comba	·	3.5 km	MPC · JPL
81797	2000 KR_{1}	—	May 26, 2000	Socorro	LINEAR	·	6.8 km	MPC · JPL
81798	2000 KB_{2}	—	May 23, 2000	Anderson Mesa	LONEOS	slow	3.8 km	MPC · JPL
81799	2000 KK_{2}	—	May 26, 2000	Socorro	LINEAR	HNS	2.6 km	MPC · JPL
81800	2000 KQ_{2}	—	May 26, 2000	Socorro	LINEAR	BAR	3.1 km	MPC · JPL

== 81801–81900 ==
back to top

Designation			Discovery			Properties		Ref
Permanent	Provisional	Named after	Date	Site	Discoverer(s)	Category	Diam.	Ref
81801	2000 KU_{3}	—	May 27, 2000	Socorro	LINEAR	·	3.3 km	MPC · JPL
81802	2000 KN_{6}	—	May 27, 2000	Socorro	LINEAR	·	5.3 km	MPC · JPL
81803	2000 KQ_{6}	—	May 27, 2000	Socorro	LINEAR	·	6.0 km	MPC · JPL
81804	2000 KJ_{7}	—	May 27, 2000	Socorro	LINEAR	·	5.6 km	MPC · JPL
81805	2000 KU_{7}	—	May 27, 2000	Socorro	LINEAR	·	3.8 km	MPC · JPL
81806	2000 KJ_{8}	—	May 27, 2000	Socorro	LINEAR	EOS	4.5 km	MPC · JPL
81807	2000 KU_{11}	—	May 28, 2000	Socorro	LINEAR	·	3.9 km	MPC · JPL
81808	2000 KC_{13}	—	May 28, 2000	Socorro	LINEAR	·	3.2 km	MPC · JPL
81809	2000 KB_{15}	—	May 28, 2000	Socorro	LINEAR	·	3.9 km	MPC · JPL
81810	2000 KC_{16}	—	May 30, 2000	Socorro	LINEAR	·	4.0 km	MPC · JPL
81811	2000 KR_{17}	—	May 28, 2000	Socorro	LINEAR	·	5.2 km	MPC · JPL
81812	2000 KX_{18}	—	May 28, 2000	Socorro	LINEAR	·	3.0 km	MPC · JPL
81813	2000 KV_{23}	—	May 28, 2000	Socorro	LINEAR	NEM	5.6 km	MPC · JPL
81814	2000 KE_{31}	—	May 28, 2000	Socorro	LINEAR	·	4.9 km	MPC · JPL
81815	2000 KP_{31}	—	May 28, 2000	Socorro	LINEAR	·	5.0 km	MPC · JPL
81816	2000 KR_{32}	—	May 28, 2000	Socorro	LINEAR	·	4.2 km	MPC · JPL
81817	2000 KH_{35}	—	May 27, 2000	Socorro	LINEAR	·	3.4 km	MPC · JPL
81818	2000 KP_{35}	—	May 27, 2000	Socorro	LINEAR	·	6.8 km	MPC · JPL
81819	2000 KS_{35}	—	May 27, 2000	Socorro	LINEAR	·	3.2 km	MPC · JPL
81820	2000 KA_{38}	—	May 24, 2000	Kitt Peak	Spacewatch	·	4.1 km	MPC · JPL
81821	2000 KF_{38}	—	May 24, 2000	Kitt Peak	Spacewatch	HYG	5.2 km	MPC · JPL
81822 Jamesearly	2000 KN_{38}	Jamesearly	May 27, 2000	OCA-Anza	M. Collins, White, M.	·	3.7 km	MPC · JPL
81823	2000 KP_{40}	—	May 30, 2000	Kitt Peak	Spacewatch	MAR	2.7 km	MPC · JPL
81824	2000 KS_{41}	—	May 27, 2000	Socorro	LINEAR	·	3.4 km	MPC · JPL
81825	2000 KG_{42}	—	May 28, 2000	Socorro	LINEAR	·	3.5 km	MPC · JPL
81826	2000 KP_{42}	—	May 28, 2000	Socorro	LINEAR	HNS	4.0 km	MPC · JPL
81827	2000 KM_{43}	—	May 26, 2000	Kitt Peak	Spacewatch	KOR	2.8 km	MPC · JPL
81828	2000 KT_{44}	—	May 28, 2000	Kitt Peak	Spacewatch	·	7.2 km	MPC · JPL
81829	2000 KF_{46}	—	May 27, 2000	Socorro	LINEAR	EUN	3.2 km	MPC · JPL
81830	2000 KJ_{46}	—	May 27, 2000	Socorro	LINEAR	·	5.3 km	MPC · JPL
81831	2000 KM_{46}	—	May 27, 2000	Socorro	LINEAR	·	4.4 km	MPC · JPL
81832	2000 KV_{46}	—	May 27, 2000	Socorro	LINEAR	·	4.2 km	MPC · JPL
81833	2000 KW_{46}	—	May 27, 2000	Socorro	LINEAR	·	4.4 km	MPC · JPL
81834	2000 KX_{46}	—	May 27, 2000	Socorro	LINEAR	EOS	4.4 km	MPC · JPL
81835	2000 KB_{47}	—	May 27, 2000	Socorro	LINEAR	·	5.0 km	MPC · JPL
81836	2000 KX_{47}	—	May 28, 2000	Socorro	LINEAR	EUN	3.0 km	MPC · JPL
81837	2000 KJ_{50}	—	May 31, 2000	Kitt Peak	Spacewatch	WIT	1.8 km	MPC · JPL
81838	2000 KB_{51}	—	May 29, 2000	Socorro	LINEAR	·	5.9 km	MPC · JPL
81839	2000 KO_{52}	—	May 24, 2000	Anderson Mesa	LONEOS	·	2.7 km	MPC · JPL
81840	2000 KV_{52}	—	May 25, 2000	Anderson Mesa	LONEOS	·	2.3 km	MPC · JPL
81841	2000 KT_{53}	—	May 27, 2000	Anderson Mesa	LONEOS	·	4.2 km	MPC · JPL
81842	2000 KU_{53}	—	May 27, 2000	Anderson Mesa	LONEOS	·	7.2 km	MPC · JPL
81843	2000 KX_{53}	—	May 27, 2000	Anderson Mesa	LONEOS	·	3.7 km	MPC · JPL
81844	2000 KV_{54}	—	May 27, 2000	Socorro	LINEAR	·	3.6 km	MPC · JPL
81845	2000 KG_{57}	—	May 30, 2000	Anderson Mesa	LONEOS	·	2.8 km	MPC · JPL
81846	2000 KH_{58}	—	May 24, 2000	Anderson Mesa	LONEOS	·	3.3 km	MPC · JPL
81847	2000 KO_{58}	—	May 24, 2000	Anderson Mesa	LONEOS	MAR	2.9 km	MPC · JPL
81848	2000 KX_{58}	—	May 24, 2000	Anderson Mesa	LONEOS	EUN	3.0 km	MPC · JPL
81849	2000 KH_{59}	—	May 24, 2000	Kitt Peak	Spacewatch	EUN	2.9 km	MPC · JPL
81850	2000 KL_{60}	—	May 25, 2000	Anderson Mesa	LONEOS	·	3.4 km	MPC · JPL
81851	2000 KO_{60}	—	May 25, 2000	Anderson Mesa	LONEOS	·	3.6 km	MPC · JPL
81852	2000 KP_{60}	—	May 25, 2000	Anderson Mesa	LONEOS	·	3.0 km	MPC · JPL
81853	2000 KW_{60}	—	May 25, 2000	Anderson Mesa	LONEOS	NEM	5.6 km	MPC · JPL
81854	2000 KC_{61}	—	May 25, 2000	Anderson Mesa	LONEOS	·	2.7 km	MPC · JPL
81855	2000 KO_{61}	—	May 25, 2000	Anderson Mesa	LONEOS	EUN	2.7 km	MPC · JPL
81856	2000 KG_{62}	—	May 26, 2000	Anderson Mesa	LONEOS	·	4.0 km	MPC · JPL
81857	2000 KV_{64}	—	May 27, 2000	Socorro	LINEAR	·	2.5 km	MPC · JPL
81858	2000 KW_{64}	—	May 27, 2000	Socorro	LINEAR	·	2.2 km	MPC · JPL
81859 Joetaylor	2000 KP_{69}	Joetaylor	May 29, 2000	Socorro	LINEAR	·	3.4 km	MPC · JPL
81860	2000 KA_{71}	—	May 28, 2000	Socorro	LINEAR	·	6.8 km	MPC · JPL
81861	2000 KK_{71}	—	May 28, 2000	Socorro	LINEAR	·	4.7 km	MPC · JPL
81862	2000 KD_{74}	—	May 27, 2000	Socorro	LINEAR	·	7.5 km	MPC · JPL
81863	2000 KV_{74}	—	May 27, 2000	Socorro	LINEAR	·	2.6 km	MPC · JPL
81864	2000 KX_{74}	—	May 27, 2000	Socorro	LINEAR	·	4.2 km	MPC · JPL
81865	2000 KO_{75}	—	May 27, 2000	Socorro	LINEAR	EOS	5.0 km	MPC · JPL
81866	2000 KO_{76}	—	May 27, 2000	Socorro	LINEAR	·	4.1 km	MPC · JPL
81867	2000 KK_{77}	—	May 27, 2000	Socorro	LINEAR	·	3.1 km	MPC · JPL
81868	2000 KZ_{77}	—	May 27, 2000	Socorro	LINEAR	·	3.1 km	MPC · JPL
81869	2000 KY_{78}	—	May 27, 2000	Socorro	LINEAR	·	5.7 km	MPC · JPL
81870	2000 LB_{1}	—	June 1, 2000	Črni Vrh	Matičič, S.	(32418)	2.6 km	MPC · JPL
81871	2000 LP_{3}	—	June 4, 2000	Socorro	LINEAR	MAR	3.3 km	MPC · JPL
81872	2000 LO_{4}	—	June 4, 2000	Socorro	LINEAR	·	7.9 km	MPC · JPL
81873	2000 LT_{4}	—	June 5, 2000	Socorro	LINEAR	·	4.4 km	MPC · JPL
81874	2000 LJ_{5}	—	June 5, 2000	Socorro	LINEAR	·	3.6 km	MPC · JPL
81875	2000 LU_{5}	—	June 4, 2000	Reedy Creek	J. Broughton	·	5.4 km	MPC · JPL
81876	2000 LN_{7}	—	June 5, 2000	Socorro	LINEAR	WAT	4.5 km	MPC · JPL
81877	2000 LQ_{7}	—	June 5, 2000	Socorro	LINEAR	·	3.0 km	MPC · JPL
81878	2000 LY_{10}	—	June 4, 2000	Socorro	LINEAR	·	4.4 km	MPC · JPL
81879	2000 LB_{11}	—	June 4, 2000	Socorro	LINEAR	·	3.5 km	MPC · JPL
81880	2000 LP_{13}	—	June 5, 2000	Socorro	LINEAR	ADE · slow	5.7 km	MPC · JPL
81881	2000 LJ_{15}	—	June 4, 2000	Kitt Peak	Spacewatch	·	2.8 km	MPC · JPL
81882	2000 LN_{15}	—	June 5, 2000	Kitt Peak	Spacewatch	·	4.0 km	MPC · JPL
81883	2000 LP_{16}	—	June 4, 2000	Socorro	LINEAR	·	3.6 km	MPC · JPL
81884	2000 LL_{17}	—	June 7, 2000	Socorro	LINEAR	·	12 km	MPC · JPL
81885	2000 LC_{19}	—	June 8, 2000	Socorro	LINEAR	·	5.2 km	MPC · JPL
81886	2000 LE_{21}	—	June 8, 2000	Socorro	LINEAR	·	6.5 km	MPC · JPL
81887	2000 LS_{22}	—	June 9, 2000	Prescott	P. G. Comba	·	10 km	MPC · JPL
81888	2000 LH_{23}	—	June 1, 2000	Anderson Mesa	LONEOS	·	10 km	MPC · JPL
81889	2000 LZ_{23}	—	June 1, 2000	Socorro	LINEAR	MAR	3.2 km	MPC · JPL
81890	2000 LV_{24}	—	June 1, 2000	Socorro	LINEAR	·	4.0 km	MPC · JPL
81891	2000 LV_{26}	—	June 5, 2000	Anderson Mesa	LONEOS	HYG	7.8 km	MPC · JPL
81892	2000 LQ_{29}	—	June 4, 2000	Haleakala	NEAT	EOS	4.5 km	MPC · JPL
81893	2000 LR_{29}	—	June 4, 2000	Haleakala	NEAT	·	3.2 km	MPC · JPL
81894	2000 LF_{31}	—	June 6, 2000	Kitt Peak	Spacewatch	(3025)	6.9 km	MPC · JPL
81895	2000 LP_{31}	—	June 5, 2000	Anderson Mesa	LONEOS	·	12 km	MPC · JPL
81896	2000 LR_{32}	—	June 4, 2000	Socorro	LINEAR	·	2.8 km	MPC · JPL
81897	2000 LS_{32}	—	June 4, 2000	Socorro	LINEAR	·	3.8 km	MPC · JPL
81898	2000 LE_{33}	—	June 4, 2000	Kitt Peak	Spacewatch	EOS	4.4 km	MPC · JPL
81899	2000 LH_{34}	—	June 3, 2000	Anderson Mesa	LONEOS	·	6.8 km	MPC · JPL
81900	2000 LF_{35}	—	June 1, 2000	Haleakala	NEAT	·	6.9 km	MPC · JPL

== 81901–82000 ==
back to top

Designation			Discovery			Properties		Ref
Permanent	Provisional	Named after	Date	Site	Discoverer(s)	Category	Diam.	Ref
81901	2000 LZ_{36}	—	June 11, 2000	Socorro	LINEAR	·	3.1 km	MPC · JPL
81902	2000 MG_{1}	—	June 25, 2000	Socorro	LINEAR	·	7.7 km	MPC · JPL
81903	2000 MM_{3}	—	June 24, 2000	Socorro	LINEAR	·	4.8 km	MPC · JPL
81904	2000 MN_{3}	—	June 24, 2000	Socorro	LINEAR	ADE	6.7 km	MPC · JPL
81905	2000 NP_{1}	—	July 3, 2000	Kitt Peak	Spacewatch	·	6.4 km	MPC · JPL
81906	2000 NV_{1}	—	July 4, 2000	Kitt Peak	Spacewatch	·	5.6 km	MPC · JPL
81907	2000 NR_{2}	—	July 5, 2000	Črni Vrh	Skvarč, J.	·	12 km	MPC · JPL
81908	2000 NW_{2}	—	July 6, 2000	Reedy Creek	J. Broughton	EUN	3.2 km	MPC · JPL
81909	2000 NY_{3}	—	July 8, 2000	Haleakala	NEAT	·	4.7 km	MPC · JPL
81910	2000 NV_{8}	—	July 5, 2000	Kitt Peak	Spacewatch	HYG	7.8 km	MPC · JPL
81911	2000 NV_{9}	—	July 6, 2000	Socorro	LINEAR	EUN	3.8 km	MPC · JPL
81912	2000 NU_{10}	—	July 6, 2000	Anderson Mesa	LONEOS	·	4.2 km	MPC · JPL
81913	2000 NX_{10}	—	July 10, 2000	Valinhos	P. R. Holvorcem	·	6.8 km	MPC · JPL
81914	2000 NJ_{11}	—	July 12, 2000	Farpoint	Farpoint	CYB	6.7 km	MPC · JPL
81915 Hartwick	2000 NS_{11}	Hartwick	July 15, 2000	NRC-DAO	D. D. Balam	·	8.7 km	MPC · JPL
81916	2000 NM_{12}	—	July 5, 2000	Anderson Mesa	LONEOS	·	6.7 km	MPC · JPL
81917	2000 NN_{12}	—	July 5, 2000	Anderson Mesa	LONEOS	URS	8.6 km	MPC · JPL
81918	2000 NT_{12}	—	July 5, 2000	Anderson Mesa	LONEOS	·	9.1 km	MPC · JPL
81919	2000 NV_{14}	—	July 5, 2000	Anderson Mesa	LONEOS	·	7.8 km	MPC · JPL
81920	2000 NA_{17}	—	July 5, 2000	Anderson Mesa	LONEOS	·	3.7 km	MPC · JPL
81921	2000 NS_{21}	—	July 7, 2000	Anderson Mesa	LONEOS	·	4.8 km	MPC · JPL
81922	2000 NV_{22}	—	July 5, 2000	Anderson Mesa	LONEOS	CYB	11 km	MPC · JPL
81923	2000 NS_{24}	—	July 4, 2000	Anderson Mesa	LONEOS	·	3.5 km	MPC · JPL
81924	2000 NW_{25}	—	July 4, 2000	Anderson Mesa	LONEOS	·	3.8 km	MPC · JPL
81925	2000 NY_{25}	—	July 4, 2000	Anderson Mesa	LONEOS	·	4.0 km	MPC · JPL
81926	2000 NZ_{27}	—	July 3, 2000	Socorro	LINEAR	·	5.3 km	MPC · JPL
81927	2000 NF_{28}	—	July 3, 2000	Socorro	LINEAR	GEF	3.1 km	MPC · JPL
81928	2000 NB_{29}	—	July 2, 2000	Haleakala	NEAT	·	5.8 km	MPC · JPL
81929	2000 OE	—	July 22, 2000	Reedy Creek	J. Broughton	EUN	3.2 km	MPC · JPL
81930	2000 ON_{4}	—	July 24, 2000	Socorro	LINEAR	·	4.3 km	MPC · JPL
81931	2000 OF_{7}	—	July 28, 2000	Višnjan Observatory	K. Korlević	·	4.4 km	MPC · JPL
81932	2000 OJ_{12}	—	July 23, 2000	Socorro	LINEAR	·	7.6 km	MPC · JPL
81933	2000 OW_{13}	—	July 23, 2000	Socorro	LINEAR	·	5.5 km	MPC · JPL
81934	2000 OL_{15}	—	July 23, 2000	Socorro	LINEAR	·	4.8 km	MPC · JPL
81935	2000 OT_{29}	—	July 30, 2000	Socorro	LINEAR	VER	9.5 km	MPC · JPL
81936	2000 OU_{29}	—	July 30, 2000	Socorro	LINEAR	·	7.9 km	MPC · JPL
81937	2000 OX_{29}	—	July 30, 2000	Socorro	LINEAR	·	9.5 km	MPC · JPL
81938	2000 OT_{32}	—	July 30, 2000	Socorro	LINEAR	·	10 km	MPC · JPL
81939	2000 OQ_{33}	—	July 30, 2000	Socorro	LINEAR	·	6.3 km	MPC · JPL
81940	2000 OW_{33}	—	July 30, 2000	Socorro	LINEAR	·	6.2 km	MPC · JPL
81941	2000 OG_{37}	—	July 30, 2000	Socorro	LINEAR	·	4.8 km	MPC · JPL
81942	2000 OV_{38}	—	July 30, 2000	Socorro	LINEAR	·	4.2 km	MPC · JPL
81943	2000 OJ_{39}	—	July 30, 2000	Socorro	LINEAR	·	4.6 km	MPC · JPL
81944	2000 OF_{43}	—	July 30, 2000	Socorro	LINEAR	·	3.8 km	MPC · JPL
81945	2000 OL_{53}	—	July 30, 2000	Socorro	LINEAR	·	7.5 km	MPC · JPL
81946	2000 OH_{60}	—	July 29, 2000	Anderson Mesa	LONEOS	·	7.5 km	MPC · JPL
81947 Fripp	2000 OF_{69}	Fripp	July 31, 2000	Cerro Tololo	M. W. Buie	·	3.6 km	MPC · JPL
81948 Eno	2000 OM_{69}	Eno	July 31, 2000	Cerro Tololo	M. W. Buie	·	5.4 km	MPC · JPL
81949	2000 PK_{2}	—	August 1, 2000	Socorro	LINEAR	·	6.3 km	MPC · JPL
81950	2000 PX_{2}	—	August 2, 2000	Socorro	LINEAR	·	7.1 km	MPC · JPL
81951	2000 PS_{10}	—	August 1, 2000	Socorro	LINEAR	·	3.0 km	MPC · JPL
81952	2000 PG_{13}	—	August 1, 2000	Kitt Peak	Spacewatch	EOS	4.3 km	MPC · JPL
81953	2000 PS_{15}	—	August 1, 2000	Socorro	LINEAR	·	4.8 km	MPC · JPL
81954	2000 PT_{17}	—	August 1, 2000	Socorro	LINEAR	THM	5.6 km	MPC · JPL
81955	2000 PT_{18}	—	August 1, 2000	Socorro	LINEAR	·	6.0 km	MPC · JPL
81956	2000 PL_{21}	—	August 1, 2000	Socorro	LINEAR	·	4.2 km	MPC · JPL
81957	2000 QG_{14}	—	August 24, 2000	Socorro	LINEAR	THM	5.0 km	MPC · JPL
81958	2000 QQ_{14}	—	August 24, 2000	Socorro	LINEAR	EOS	6.0 km	MPC · JPL
81959	2000 QQ_{17}	—	August 24, 2000	Socorro	LINEAR	·	5.7 km	MPC · JPL
81960	2000 QZ_{28}	—	August 24, 2000	Socorro	LINEAR	·	7.0 km	MPC · JPL
81961	2000 QG_{29}	—	August 24, 2000	Socorro	LINEAR	·	4.7 km	MPC · JPL
81962	2000 QB_{32}	—	August 26, 2000	Socorro	LINEAR	·	6.5 km	MPC · JPL
81963	2000 QO_{33}	—	August 26, 2000	Socorro	LINEAR	·	4.2 km	MPC · JPL
81964	2000 QX_{35}	—	August 24, 2000	Socorro	LINEAR	·	4.1 km	MPC · JPL
81965	2000 QF_{38}	—	August 24, 2000	Socorro	LINEAR	·	4.9 km	MPC · JPL
81966	2000 QJ_{41}	—	August 24, 2000	Socorro	LINEAR	EOS	4.0 km	MPC · JPL
81967	2000 QL_{41}	—	August 24, 2000	Socorro	LINEAR	·	7.3 km	MPC · JPL
81968	2000 QQ_{49}	—	August 24, 2000	Socorro	LINEAR	·	3.1 km	MPC · JPL
81969	2000 QH_{55}	—	August 25, 2000	Socorro	LINEAR	·	6.5 km	MPC · JPL
81970	2000 QT_{55}	—	August 25, 2000	Socorro	LINEAR	THM	5.7 km	MPC · JPL
81971 Turonclavere	2000 QX_{68}	Turonclavere	August 22, 2000	Saint-Véran	L. Kotková, Montanne, J.	·	6.2 km	MPC · JPL
81972	2000 QJ_{70}	—	August 28, 2000	Socorro	LINEAR	H	1.1 km	MPC · JPL
81973	2000 QM_{72}	—	August 24, 2000	Socorro	LINEAR	·	9.1 km	MPC · JPL
81974	2000 QT_{77}	—	August 24, 2000	Socorro	LINEAR	·	3.7 km	MPC · JPL
81975	2000 QH_{78}	—	August 24, 2000	Socorro	LINEAR	·	6.2 km	MPC · JPL
81976	2000 QN_{84}	—	August 25, 2000	Socorro	LINEAR	·	4.6 km	MPC · JPL
81977	2000 QK_{85}	—	August 25, 2000	Socorro	LINEAR	·	8.2 km	MPC · JPL
81978	2000 QV_{86}	—	August 25, 2000	Socorro	LINEAR	·	6.6 km	MPC · JPL
81979	2000 QH_{88}	—	August 25, 2000	Socorro	LINEAR	TEL	3.2 km	MPC · JPL
81980	2000 QT_{96}	—	August 28, 2000	Socorro	LINEAR	·	6.1 km	MPC · JPL
81981	2000 QY_{112}	—	August 24, 2000	Socorro	LINEAR	·	5.1 km	MPC · JPL
81982	2000 QO_{114}	—	August 24, 2000	Socorro	LINEAR	DOR	6.2 km	MPC · JPL
81983	2000 QA_{117}	—	August 29, 2000	Socorro	LINEAR	·	5.1 km	MPC · JPL
81984	2000 QV_{119}	—	August 25, 2000	Socorro	LINEAR	·	8.0 km	MPC · JPL
81985	2000 QV_{122}	—	August 25, 2000	Socorro	LINEAR	·	5.4 km	MPC · JPL
81986	2000 QQ_{123}	—	August 25, 2000	Socorro	LINEAR	TIN	2.4 km	MPC · JPL
81987	2000 QE_{133}	—	August 26, 2000	Socorro	LINEAR	·	6.0 km	MPC · JPL
81988	2000 QZ_{133}	—	August 26, 2000	Socorro	LINEAR	·	7.4 km	MPC · JPL
81989	2000 QC_{136}	—	August 28, 2000	Socorro	LINEAR	·	4.7 km	MPC · JPL
81990	2000 QC_{155}	—	August 31, 2000	Socorro	LINEAR	EOS	5.1 km	MPC · JPL
81991	2000 QN_{162}	—	August 31, 2000	Socorro	LINEAR	·	6.1 km	MPC · JPL
81992	2000 QX_{163}	—	August 31, 2000	Socorro	LINEAR	·	6.6 km	MPC · JPL
81993	2000 QG_{183}	—	August 24, 2000	Socorro	LINEAR	·	8.6 km	MPC · JPL
81994	2000 QT_{184}	—	August 26, 2000	Socorro	LINEAR	·	9.9 km	MPC · JPL
81995	2000 QK_{185}	—	August 26, 2000	Socorro	LINEAR	HYG	5.1 km	MPC · JPL
81996	2000 QJ_{196}	—	August 28, 2000	Socorro	LINEAR	LIX	6.5 km	MPC · JPL
81997	2000 QB_{203}	—	August 29, 2000	Socorro	LINEAR	HYG	6.2 km	MPC · JPL
81998	2000 QX_{210}	—	August 31, 2000	Socorro	LINEAR	·	3.3 km	MPC · JPL
81999	2000 QM_{212}	—	August 31, 2000	Socorro	LINEAR	THM	5.7 km	MPC · JPL
82000	2000 QD_{219}	—	August 20, 2000	Anderson Mesa	LONEOS	HYG	5.8 km	MPC · JPL

back to top

== See also ==
- Meanings of minor-planet names: 81001–82000
