= Meanings of minor-planet names: 81001–82000 =

As minor planet discoveries are confirmed, they are given a permanent number by the IAU's Minor Planet Center (MPC), and the discoverers can then submit names for them, following the IAU's naming conventions. The list below concerns those minor planets in the specified number-range that have received names, and explains the meanings of those names.

Official naming citations of newly named small Solar System bodies are approved and published in a bulletin by IAU's Working Group for Small Bodies Nomenclature (WGSBN). Before May 2021, citations were published in MPC's Minor Planet Circulars for many decades. Recent citations can also be found on the JPL Small-Body Database (SBDB). Until his death in 2016, German astronomer Lutz D. Schmadel compiled these citations into the Dictionary of Minor Planet Names (DMP) and regularly updated the collection.

Based on Paul Herget's The Names of the Minor Planets, Schmadel also researched the unclear origin of numerous asteroids, most of which had been named prior to World War II. This article incorporates text from this source, which is in the public domain: SBDB New namings may only be added to this list below after official publication as the preannouncement of names is condemned. The WGSBN publishes a comprehensive guideline for the naming rules of non-cometary small Solar System bodies.

== 81001–81100 ==
| Named minor planet | Provisional | This minor planet was named for... | Ref · Catalog |
|---|---|---|---|
There are no named minor planets in this number range

== 81101–81200 ==
back to top

| Named minor planet | Provisional | This minor planet was named for... | Ref · Catalog |
|---|---|---|---|
There are no named minor planets in this number range

== 81201–81300 ==
back to top

| Named minor planet | Provisional | This minor planet was named for... | Ref · Catalog |
|---|---|---|---|
| 81203 Polynesia | 2000 FQ_{10} | French Polynesia, because it was the first discovery from this region of the world | JPL · 81203 |

== 81301–81400 ==
back to top

| Named minor planet | Provisional | This minor planet was named for... | Ref · Catalog |
|---|---|---|---|
There are no named minor planets in this number range

== 81401–81500 ==
back to top

| Named minor planet | Provisional | This minor planet was named for... | Ref · Catalog |
|---|---|---|---|
There are no named minor planets in this number range

== 81501–81600 ==
back to top

| Named minor planet | Provisional | This minor planet was named for... | Ref · Catalog |
|---|---|---|---|
There are no named minor planets in this number range

== 81601–81700 ==
back to top

| Named minor planet | Provisional | This minor planet was named for... | Ref · Catalog |
|---|---|---|---|
There are no named minor planets in this number range

== 81701–81800 ==
back to top

| Named minor planet | Provisional | This minor planet was named for... | Ref · Catalog |
|---|---|---|---|
| 81790 Lewislove | 2000 JL_{84} | Lewis E. Love (born 1928), American physics teacher at Great Neck North High School | JPL · 81790 |

== 81801–81900 ==
back to top

| Named minor planet | Provisional | This minor planet was named for... | Ref · Catalog |
|---|---|---|---|
| 81822 Jamesearly | 2000 KN_{38} | James M. Early (1922–2004), American co-inventor of the transistor | JPL · 81822 |
| 81859 Joetaylor | 2000 KP_{69} | Joseph Hooton Taylor Jr. (born 1941), American astronomer, pulsar hunter extraordinaire, Nobel laureate and MacArthur fellow. The naming is on the occasion of his retirement as a professor at Princeton University in September 2006. | JPL · 81859 |

== 81901–82000 ==
back to top

| Named minor planet | Provisional | This minor planet was named for... | Ref · Catalog |
|---|---|---|---|
| 81915 Hartwick | 2000 NS_{11} | F. David A. Hartwick (born 1941), Canadian astrophysicist at the University of Victoria | MPC · 81915 |
| 81947 Fripp | 2000 OF_{69} | Robert Fripp (born 1946) is a musician who pushes the boundaries of music using guitars, masterful technique, and recording and sound processing effects. His leadership of King Crimson and work with fellow experimentalist Brian Eno has been an essential innovative driving force in music. | JPL · 81947 |
| 81948 Eno | 2000 OM_{69} | Brian Eno (born 1948) is an experimental sculptor of sound who has worked with many musicians in his career, notably as an iconic duo with Robert Fripp (see entry above). Along with Fripp, he is from the research and development branch of music intermingled with Oblique Strategies. | JPL · 81948 |
| 81971 Turonclavere | 2000 QX_{68} | Marie-Hélène Turon Clavère (born 1949), French schoolteacher and amateur astronomer | JPL · 81971 |

back to top

| Preceded by 80,001–81,000 | Meanings of minor-planet names List of minor planets: 81,001–82,000 | Succeeded by 82,001–83,000 |
