= Zero (Brazilian band) =

Brazilian rock band

- Origin: São Paulo, São Paulo, Brazil (as of 1998 based in Rio de Janeiro, Rio de Janeiro)
- Genres: Post-punk, new wave (early); alternative rock, art rock
- Years active: 1983–1989; 1998–present
- Labels: CBS, EMI, Sony, Voiceprint Records
- Spinoffs: Violeta de Outono, Nau
- Members: Guilherme Isnard; Nivaldo Ramos; Daniel Viana; Gustavo Wermelinger; Caius Marins
- Past members: See below
- Website: bandazero.com

Zero (Portuguese pronunciation: [zˈɛɾu]), stylized in all capital letters as ZERØ, is a Brazilian rock band formed in 1983 in São Paulo and based in Rio de Janeiro since 1998, widely considered to be major forerunners of the New Romantic movement in Brazil.

== History ==
=== Early years and "Heróis" (1983–1985) ===
Zero arose from Ultimato (formerly known as Lux), an instrumental punk jazz/no wave band formed in São Paulo in 1978 (and renamed as Ultimato in 1981) by Fabio Golfetti, Alberto "Beto" Birger, Cláudio Souza, Gilles Eduar and Nelson Coelho. Future vocalist Guilherme Isnard, who had recently left his former band Voluntários da Pátria, was introduced to Ultimato by his friend Luiz Antônio Ribas, owner of now-defunct independent record company Underground Discos e Artes; Isnard then decided to join the band, and approached its members to begin writing lyrics for their songs. Their musical style eventually shifted to "art rock with a hardcore punch", in the words of Isnard, and in 1983 the band reorganized itself as Zero. Their first release was the single "Heróis", which came out by CBS in 1985.

=== Line-up changes, Passos no Escuro and Carne Humana (1985–1987) ===
In 1985 the band made a guest appearance on May East's debut album Remota Batucada, on the track "Caim e Abel" – however it would also suffer a major re-structuring in its line-up in the same year, with all members but Isnard departing. Most of its former members would start projects of their own: Fabio Golfetti and Cláudio Souza formed the influential psychedelic rock group Violeta de Outono, while Beto Birger would join Nau alongside Vange Leonel.

Isnard was then joined by the band's "classic" line-up: Alfred "Freddy" Haiat (formerly from Degradée and the brother of Metrô guitarist Alec Haiat) on keyboards, Ricardo "Rick" Villas-Boas on bass, Eduardo Amarante (formerly from Agentss and Azul 29) on guitar and Athos Costa on drums. Their first major studio release was the extended play Passos no Escuro, via EMI; it was a major commercial hit, to the point of receiving a Gold Certification by Pro-Música Brasil. The EP spawned the hit singles "Formosa" and "Agora Eu Sei", the latter counting with a guest appearance by RPM vocalist Paulo Ricardo providing additional vocals.

In 1987 Athos Costa left the band and was replaced by also former Azul 29 member Malcolm Oakley. The band then began work on their first studio album, Carne Humana, which was not as successful as their EP, but spawned the also popular singles "Quimeras" and "A Luta e o Prazer". In the same year they opened Tina Turner's shows in São Paulo and Rio de Janeiro.

=== Split-up and aftermath (1989) ===
Citing a lack of interest in continuing the band, Guilherme Isnard announced Zero was breaking up in 1989. He then moved to Nova Friburgo, in Rio de Janeiro, where he began other projects, such as the tribute act to Roxy Music and Bryan Ferry Roxy Nights. He also works as a baker.

Rick Villas-Boas moved temporarily to the Netherlands before returning to Brazil; Eduardo Amarante moved to Aracaju, where he owns a bar; Malcolm Oakley became an advertising executive; and Freddy Haiat opened a musical instruments store alongside his brother Alec.

=== Reunion (1998–) ===
Isnard reformed Zero's classic line-up for a show celebrating the band's 15th anniversary in 1998; it was originally planned to be a one-time show, but the fans' response was so positive they announced a full reunion. Their first release after their hiatus (albeit with a slightly different line-up – Sérgio Naciffe joined the band as drummer, and João Paulo Mendonça served as an additional keyboardist) was the compilation Electro-Acústico, which came out in 2000 by Sony and featured acoustic re-recordings of some of the band's older songs, plus four previously unreleased tracks. It counted with guest appearances by Philippe Seabra of Plebe Rude and Bruno Gouveia of Biquini Cavadão.

In 2003, to celebrate Zero's 20th anniversary, EMI released Obra Completa, a combination of Passos no Escuro and Carne Humana in one album.

In 2004 Voiceprint Records issued Dias Melhores, a compilation of never released demos and other early material recorded by the band between 1984 and 1985.

In 2006 Zero saw another change in its line-up, with the entrance of Jorge Pescara on bass, Yan França on guitar and Vitor Vidaut on drums; on August 30, 2007, they self-released their first studio album since 1987, Quinto Elemento. Preliminary demo recordings of each of the album's songs are available for streaming at the band's official Myspace profile.

Further reunions of the band's classic line-up happened in 2012, when they played their first two releases in their entirety live, and 2013, for shows celebrating Zero's 30th anniversary; Isnard announced a live DVD of their performances, but as of yet it has not been released.

In 2017 Isnard completely overhauled Zero's line-up for a series of shows celebrating the 30th anniversary of their debut full-length album, Carne Humana.

== Line-up ==
=== Current members ===
- Guilherme Isnard – vocals (1983–1989, 1998–)
- Nivaldo Ramos – bass guitar (2017–)
- Daniel Viana – electric guitar (2017–)
- Gustavo Wermelinger – drums (2017–)
- Caius Marins – keyboards (2017–)

=== Former members ===
- Fabio Golfetti – electric guitar (1983–1985)
- Cláudio Souza – drums (1983–1985)
- Alberto "Beto" Birger – bass guitar (1983–1985)
- Gilles Eduar – sax (1983–1985)
- Nelson Coelho – electric guitar (1983–1985)
- Eduardo Amarante – electric guitar (1985–1989, 1998–2006, 2012, 2013)
- Ricardo "Rick" Villas-Boas – bass guitar(1985–1989, 1998–2006, 2012, 2013)
- Alfred "Freddy" Haiat – keyboards (1985–1989, 1998–2006, 2012, 2013)
- Athos Costa – drums (1985–1987, 1998–2000, 2012, 2013)
- Malcolm Oakley – drums (1987–1989)
- Sérgio Naciffe – drums (2000–2006)
- João Paulo "JP" Mendonça – keyboards (2000)
- Vitor Vidaut – drums (2006–2017)
- Yan França – electric guitar (2006–2017)
- Jorge Pescara – bass guitar (2006–2017)

== Discography ==
=== Studio albums ===
Year	Album
1987	Carne Humana: Release date: January 16, 1987; Label: EMI; Format: Vinyl
2007	Quinto Elemento: Release date: August 30, 2007; Label: Self-released; Format: CD

=== Extended plays ===
Year	Album
1985	Passos no Escuro: Label: EMI; Format: Vinyl

=== Singles ===
Year	Single	Album
1985	"Heróis"	Non-album song
1985	"Agora Eu Sei"	Passos no Escuro
1985	"Formosa"	Passos no Escuro
1987	"Quimeras"	Carne Humana
1987	"A Luta e o Prazer"	Carne Humana

=== Compilations ===
Year	Album
2000	Electro-Acústico: Label: Sony; Format: CD
2003	Obra Completa: Label: EMI; Format: CD
2004	Dias Melhores: Label: Voiceprint Records; Format: CD
