= Obra Completa =

Compilation album by Zero
- Released: 2003
- Recorded: 1985, 1987
- Genre: Post-punk, new wave
- Label: EMI

Zero chronology
Electro-Acústico (2000)	Obra Completa (2003)	Dias Melhores (2004)

Obra Completa (Portuguese for "Complete Works") is a compilation album by Brazilian rock band Zero, released in 2003 by EMI in order to celebrate the band's 20th anniversary. It is a combination of their EP Passos no Escuro and their first (and, at the time of the compilation's release, only) studio album Carne Humana, completely remastered, in one CD. The compilation is currently out of print.

The album's cover is a homage to Norman Rockwell's 1962 painting The Connoisseur.

== Track listing ==
No.	Title	Original release	Length
1.	"Cada Fio, um Sonho"	Passos no Escuro (1985)	4:13
2.	"Agora Eu Sei" (feat. Paulo Ricardo)	Passos no Escuro (1985)	4:44
3.	"Formosa"	Passos no Escuro (1985)	4:21
4.	"Os Olhos Falam"	Passos no Escuro (1985)	3:58
5.	"Passos no Escuro"	Passos no Escuro (1985)	4:03
6.	"Quero te Contar"	Passos no Escuro (1985)	4:24
7.	"Algum Vício"	Carne Humana (1987)	5:02
8.	"Quimeras"	Carne Humana (1987)	4:35
9.	"Linha da Vida"	Carne Humana (1987)	4:13
10.	"Abuso de Poder"	Carne Humana (1987)	4:52
11.	"Medo de Voar"	Carne Humana (1987)	5:27
12.	"Carne Humana"	Carne Humana (1987)	4:46
13.	"Seu Planeta"	Carne Humana (1987)	3:48
14.	"Game Over"	Carne Humana (1987)	3:57
15.	"Sem Pudor"	Carne Humana (1987)	4:16
16.	"A Luta e o Prazer"	Carne Humana (1987)	5:01

== Personnel ==
- Guilherme Isnard – vocals, alto sax (on tracks 1, 2 and 4)
- Eduardo Amarante – guitar
- Alfred "Freddy" Haiat – keyboards
- Ricardo "Rick" Villas-Boas – bass
- Athos Costa – drums (on tracks 1–6)
- Malcolm Oakley – drums (on tracks 7–16)
- Paulo Ricardo – backing vocals (on track 2)
