= Dias Melhores =

Compilation album by Zero
- Released: 2004
- Recorded: 1984–85
- Genre: Post-punk
- Label: Voiceprint Records
- Producer: Fabio Golfetti

Zero chronology
Obra Completa (2003)	Dias Melhores (2004)	Quinto Elemento (2007)

Dias Melhores (Portuguese for "Better Days") is a compilation album by Brazilian rock band Zero, released in 2004 by Voiceprint Records. It is composed of many songs and rarities Zero recorded during the beginning of their career, approximately between 1984 and 1985, and as such it is one of the few registers of their first ever line-up, comprising vocalist Guilherme Isnard, guitarists Fabio Golfetti and Nelson Coelho, drummer Cláudio Souza, bassist Beto Birger and saxophonist Gilles Eduar. Isnard would be the band's only founding member to remain in Zero's many different line-ups.

The album was organized by Fabio Golfetti and Renato Donisete, owner of Zero's official fan-club located in São Caetano do Sul, São Paulo, and produced by Golfetti.

== Track listing ==
All lyrics are written by Guilherme Isnard, except where noted

No.	Title	Lyrics	Length
1.	"Heróis" (Heroes)		3:22
2.	"100% Paixão" (100% Passion)		3:49
3.	"Caim e Abel" (Cain and Abel; feat. May East)	May East	3:49
4.	"Os Olhos Falam" (The Eyes Speak)	Beto Birger, Cláudio Souza, Fabio Golfetti, Guilherme Isnard, Nelson Coelho	3:27
5.	"Objetos do Desejo" (Objects of Desire)		3:18
6.	"Heróis de Hamelin" (Heroes from Hamelin)		3:17
7.	"Cidade Maldita" (Cursed City)		3:01
8.	"Dias Melhores" (Better Days)		3:00
9.	"15 Anos" (15 Years)		2:57
10.	"Falar e Ouvir" (To Speak and to Listen)		4:39
11.	"Humanidade" (Mankind)		3:38
12.	"Zero"		3:12

=== Notes ===
- Tracks 1–2 were taken from the single "Heróis" (1985).
- Track 3 was taken from May East's debut studio album Remota Batucada (1985).
- Tracks 4–8 were taken from a previously unreleased demo tape recorded by the band in 1984; "Os Olhos Falam" would be eventually re-recorded for Zero's EP Passos no Escuro, and once again for their compilation Electro-Acústico. "Heróis de Hamelin" is simply an alternate version of "Heróis", but with a different title.
- Tracks 9–12 were taken from a rehearsal recorded by the band between 1984 and 1985.

== Personnel ==
- Guilherme Isnard – vocals, backing vocals (on track 3), cover art
- Fabio Golfetti – guitar, production, compiling
- Cláudio Souza – drums
- Alberto "Beto" Birger – bass, backing vocals (on track 3)
- Gilles Eduar – sax (on tracks 4–12), backing vocals (on track 3)
- Nelson Coelho – guitar, backing vocals (on track 3)
- May East – vocals (on track 3)
- Ricardo Donisete – compiling
