= Tap guitar =

Tap guitar is a class of guitar that is played primarily by tapping on the strings. Any guitar can be played this way, but there are various specialty brands of instruments that are designed specifically for this technique.

Various approaches to tapping exist, but the most common used by players on these specialty instruments was developed by Emmett Chapman in 1969, and uses both hands tapping with fingers parallel to the frets rather than having the right hand parallel to the strings as on a conventional guitar.

Early pioneers in tapping used the former conventional orientation, like Jimmie Webster and Dave Bunker.

== Dedicated tapping instruments ==
- Megatar
- Chapman Stick
- NS/Stick

== See also ==
- Stanley Jordan
- Tapping
