= Electro-Acústico =

Compilation album by Zero
- Released: 2000
- Genre: Synthrock, pop rock, acoustic rock, electroacoustic music
- Label: Sony Music Entertainment
- Producer: JP Mendonça

Zero chronology
Carne Humana (1987)	Electro-Acústico (2000)	Obra Completa (2003)

Professional ratings
Review scores
Source	Rating
Cliquemusic	link

Electro-Acústico (Portuguese for "Electro-Acoustic") is a compilation album by Brazilian rock band Zero. Their first release in 13 years since the studio album Carne Humana, it came out in 2000 by Sony Music Entertainment. It is a compilation of electronic-influenced acoustic re-recordings of some of the band's old songs, particularly ranging from their 1985 EP Passos no Escuro to Carne Humana, plus four previously unreleased tracks. The album counts with guest appearances by Philippe Seabra of Plebe Rude and Bruno Gouveia of Biquini Cavadão.

"Em Volta do Sol", "Mentiras" and "Dedicatória" would be eventually re-recorded for Zero's second studio album, Quinto Elemento, released in 2007.

== Track listing ==
No.	Title	Original release	Length
1.	"Agora Eu Sei (Electro-Acoustic)"	Passos no Escuro (1985)	3:48
2.	"Formosa"	Passos no Escuro (1985)	4:51
3.	"Mentiras"	Previously unreleased	4:21
4.	"Carne Humana"	Carne Humana (1987)	4:05
5.	"Heróis"	"Heróis" single (1985)	3:33
6.	"Me Solta!"	Previously unreleased	3:24
7.	"Algum Vício"	Carne Humana (1987)	4:11
8.	"Quimeras"	Carne Humana (1987)	4:57
9.	"Em Volta do Sol"	Previously unreleased	3:06
10.	"Dedicatória"	Previously unreleased	3:34
11.	"Os Olhos Falam"	Passos no Escuro (1985)	3:19
12.	"Cada Fio, um Sonho"	Passos no Escuro (1985)	4:06
13.	"Passos no Escuro"	Passos no Escuro (1985)	5:54
14.	"A Luta e o Prazer"	Carne Humana (1987)	4:38
15.	"Agora Eu Sei (Electro)"	Passos no Escuro (1985)	4:45

== Personnel ==
- Guilherme Isnard – vocals
- Eduardo Amarante – guitar
- Alfred "Freddy" Haiat – keyboards
- Ricardo "Rick" Villas-Boas – bass
- Sérgio Naciffe – drums
- João Paulo "JP" Mendonça – keyboards, production
- Philippe Seabra – guitar (on track 5)
- Bruno Gouveia – backing vocals (on tracks 4 and 5)
