= Agentss (EP) =

EP by Agentss
- Released: 1981
- Recorded: August 1981
- Genres: Post-punk, new wave, electronic, synthpop
- Label: Self-released

Agentss chronology
Agentss (1981)	Professor Digital/Cidade Industrial (1983)

Agentss is an extended play by the homonymous Brazilian new wave band Agentss. It was released independently in 1981, and was their first official release.

== Background ==
The track "Agentss" opens with a dialogue in German between an unnamed woman and a man named Ralf (portrayed by Sabine Bartlewski and Roberto Wendel respectively). The dialogue goes as follows:

Woman: Hallo, Ralf, hast du schon was über die Agentss gehört? (Hello, Ralf, have you ever heard of Agentss?)
Ralf: Was ist das? (What's that?)
Woman: Agentss, Ralf, Agentss.
Ralf: Ach, Agentss. Sicher habe ich über die Agentss gehört... Früher habe ich sie lehren. (Ah, Agentss. Of course I've heard of them... I used to teach them.)
Woman: Und ich, ich lerne von innem. (And I, I learn from them.)

According to the band's frontman, Kodiak Bachine, the name "Ralf" is an allusion to Ralf Hütter, the lead singer of krautrock band Kraftwerk. Kraftwerk is one of Bachine's major influences. Years later, in 2005, this track would appear in the German compilation Não Wave.

The track "Angra" is a satire regarding the Angra Nuclear Power Plant in Angra dos Reis, Rio de Janeiro.

== Track listing ==
All tracks are written by Kodiak Bachine unless noted.

No.	Title	Length
1.	"Agentss"	4:51
2.	"Angra" (Miguel Barella)	2:25

== Personnel ==
- Kodiak Bachine – vocals, keyboards
- Miguel "Orion Mike" Barella – guitar
- Eduardo "Duo" Amarante – guitar
- Luiz F. Portela – bass
- Roberto L. Antonio and Armando Tibério Jr. – drums
