= Touch guitar =

Stringed instrument of the guitar family

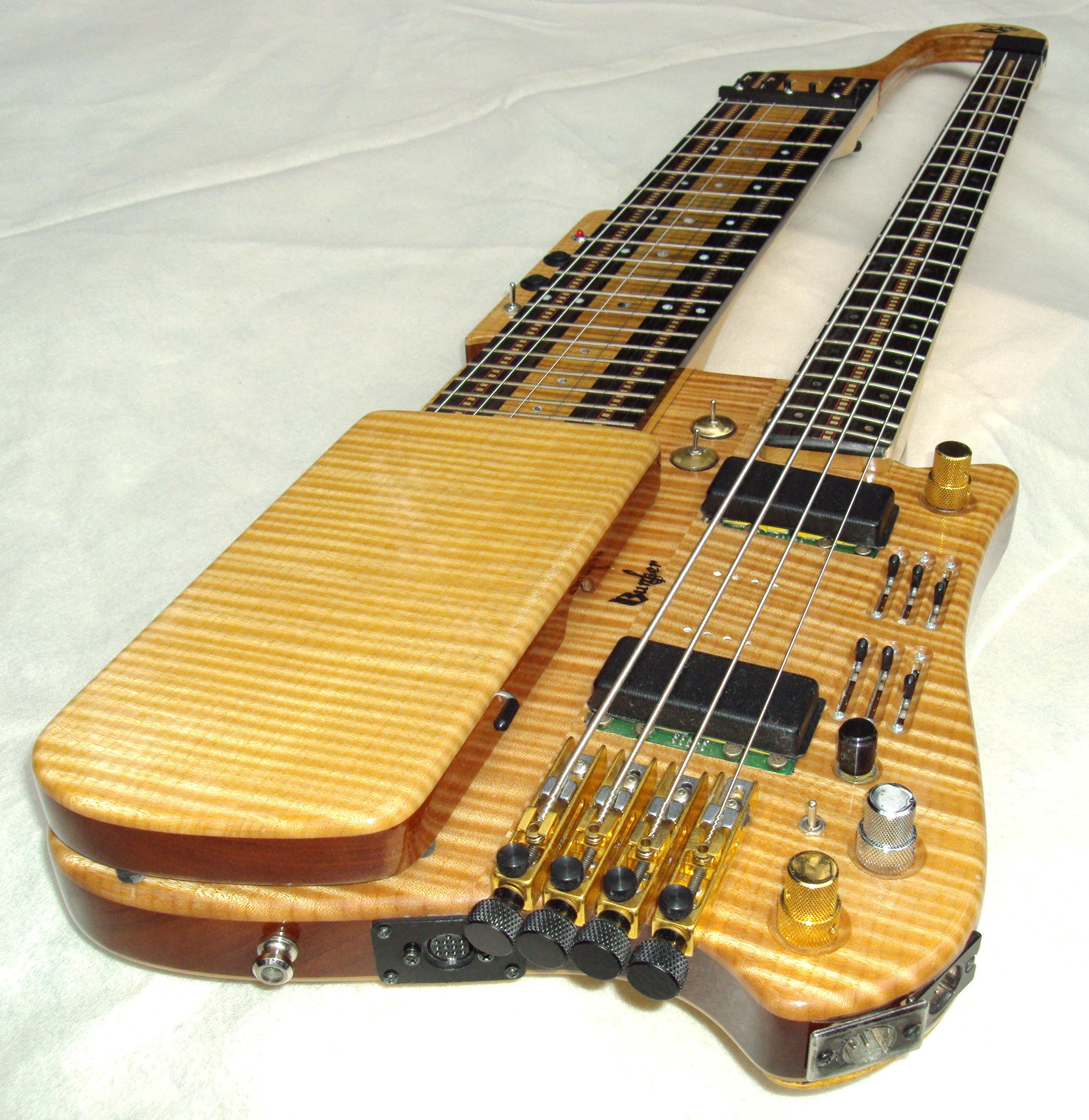
- Double-neck, headless touch guitar

String instrument
- Classification: String
- Hornbostel–Sachs classification: 321.322 (Composite chordophone)
- Inventors: Jimmie Webster; Harry DeArmond; Dave Bunker
- Developed: 1950s—60s

Related instruments
- Warr Guitar; Chapman stick; Megatar

The touch guitar is a stringed instrument of the guitar family which has been designed to use a fretboard-tapping playing style. Touch guitars are meant to be touched or tapped, not strummed.

== History ==
The touch or tapping technique was formally codified by American guitarist Jimmie Webster in his 1952 method book called the Illustrated Touch System.

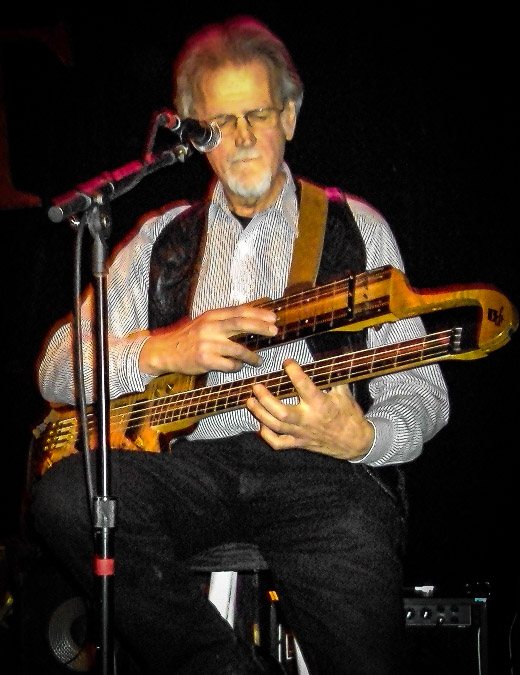
Dave Bunker playing a double-neck touch guitar

Webster credited pickup designer Harry DeArmond with first demonstrating the potential for touch-style playing. Webster himself collaborated with Gretsch Guitars on a guitar stereo pickup design for the Touch System (which fed the bass and melody output to two separate amplifiers), but the concept was not commercially successful.

Unlike Webster's approach, which was to play on a single-necked instrument, guitarist and luthier Dave Bunker designed, built, and patented (in 1961) the first double-necked, headless, touch-tapping instrument called the DuoLectar. While both guitarists employed a two-handed tapping technique, Webster used a single-necked instrument while Bunker used his double-necked DuoLectar guitar.

Webster's tapping technique can be heard on a 1959 record. In 1960, Bunker first demonstrated his double-necked instrument for the Portland Oregonian newspaper, and then on the nationally broadcast television show Ozark Jubilee. His designs ultimately led to his double-necked touch guitar in 1975.

Other designs followed. Among them was the single-neck Chapman Stick (developed by Emmett Chapman in 1970 and produced in 1974), the single-neck Warr Guitar (first produced in 1991) and the single-neck Mobius Megatar. Other touch guitars have included the Solene, Chuck Soupios's dual-necked BiAxe (patented in 1980 and produced during the early 1980s), and Sergio Santucci's TrebleBass.

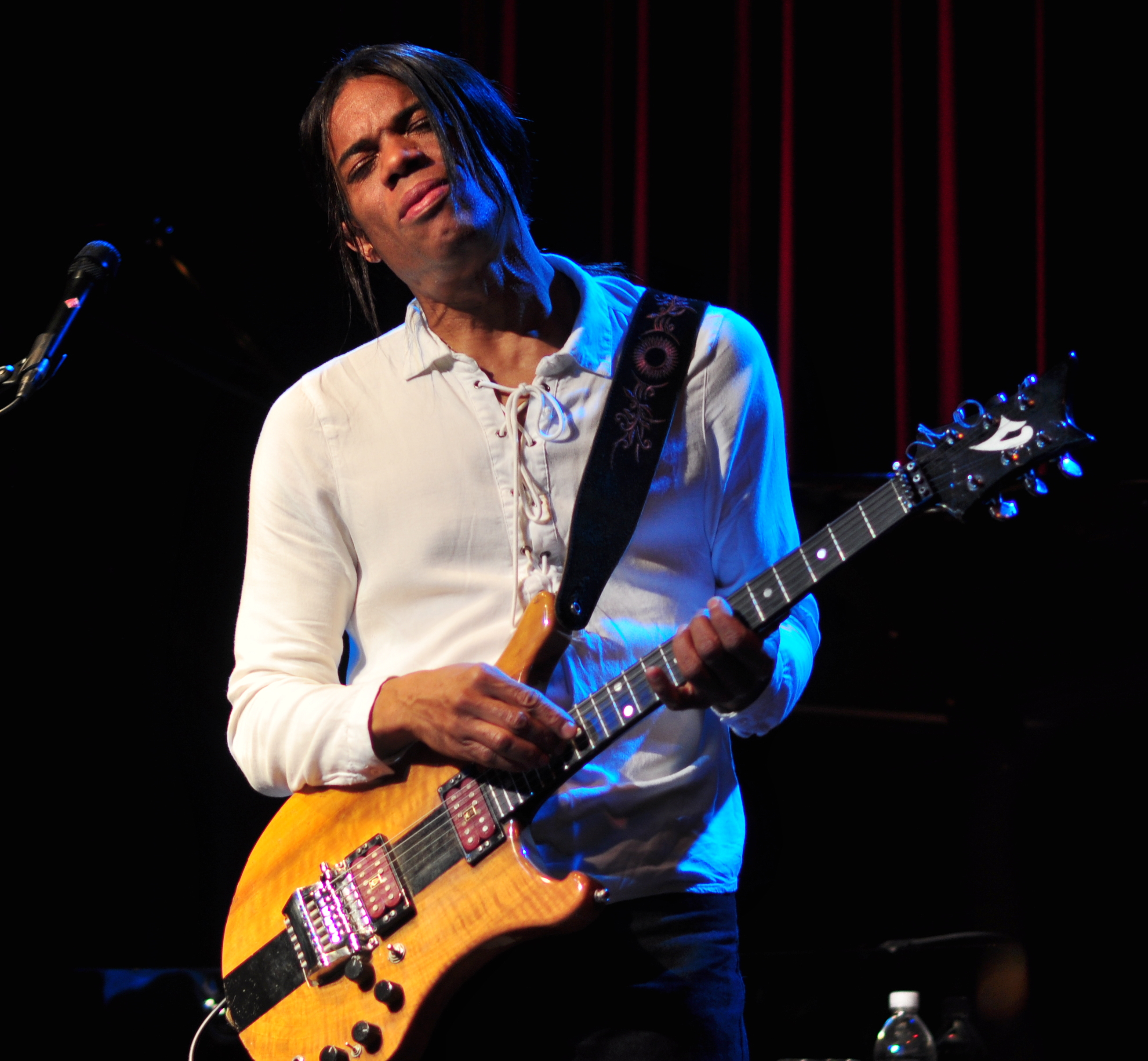
Stanley Jordan playing a single-neck touch guitar

Merle Travis occasionally used a tapping style on his single-neck, strummed guitar, as did Roy Smeck, George Van Eps, Barney Kessel and Harvey Mandell. Subsequent years have seen Eddie Van Halen, Stanley Jordan, Steve Vai, Jeff Healey, Fred Frith, Hans Reichel, Elliott Sharp, and Markus Reuter all feature the use of tapping techniques.
