= Enver İzmaylov =

Crimean Tatar folk and jazz guitarist

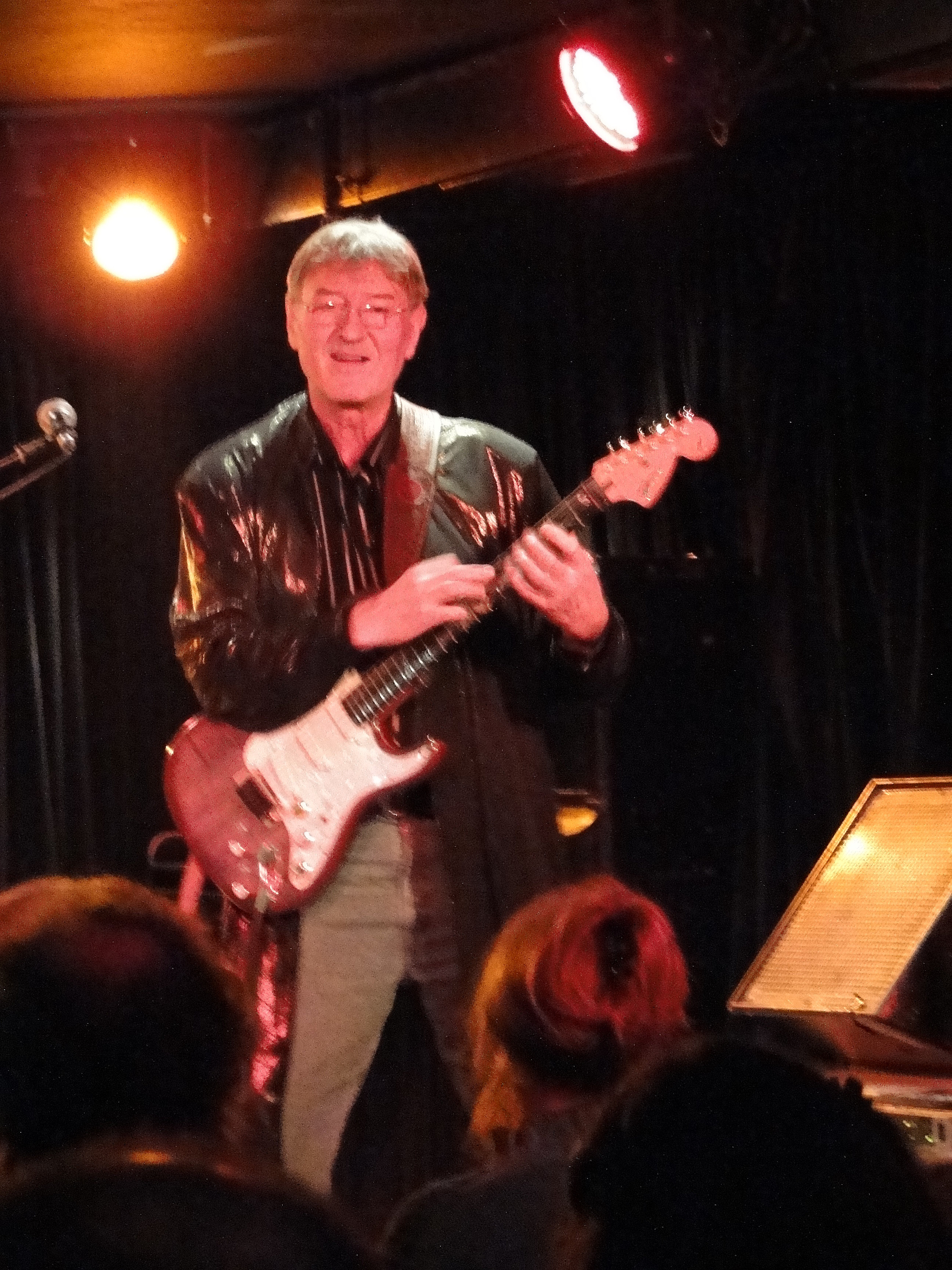
- Enver İzmaylov 2009 in Germany.

Background information
- Born: June 12, 1955 (age 71); Fergana, Uzbek Soviet Socialist Republic, Soviet Union, present-day Fergana, Uzbekistan
- Genres: Folk, jazz
- Occupation: Musician
- Instrument: Guitar
- Years active: 1970–present

Enver İzmaylov (Ukrainian: Енвер Ізмайлов, Russian: Энвер Измайлов; born June 12, 1955) is a Crimean Tatar folk and jazz guitarist who uses a tapping style on electric guitar.

== Career ==
Enver İzmaylov was born in Fergana, Uzbek Soviet Socialist Republic, Soviet Union into a Crimean Tatar family previously deported from the Crimea to which he later returned in 1989.

Although he played guitar since he was fifteen, he studied bassoon at the Fergana Music School and graduated in 1973. For eight years he was a member of the band Sato with leader Leonid Atabekov and appeared on the albums Efsane (1986) and Pass the good around in (1987). He went back to school and got a degree from Tashkert University, then began a solo career.

In 1995 he won the First European International Guitar Competition in Lausanne, Switzerland. During the same year, he was named Musician of the Year by Ukrainian music critics. He has toured in Ukraine, Russia, Estonia, Moldavia, Bulgaria, Finland, Norway, Sweden, Denmark, Belgium, Italy, Germany, Turkey, and the U.S.

In addition to recording solo albums, he has worked in duets with French keyboardist Xavier Garcia, Turkish drummer Burhan Ocal, and British saxophonist Geoff Warren. He founded the Art Trio of Crimea with Bari Rustem on percussion and Narket Ramazanov on clarinet, saxophone, and flute. İzmaylov is also a throatsinger.

== Technique ==
İzmaylov plays guitar by tapping the neck of the electric guitar with his fingertips as if it were a keyboard. A similar technique is used by jazz guitarist Stanley Jordan.

İzmaylov combines Crimean Tatar traditional music, Turkish, Uzbek, Balkan, classical music, and jazz. Many of his pieces are composed in time signatures such as 5/8, 7/8, 9/8, 11/8, 11/16, and 13/16 which are common in Crimean Tatar music. He has a triple-neck guitar that was custom made for him in Kyiv. He uses two nonstandard tunings: (low to high) E, B, E, E, B, E and C, C, G, C, C, C.

== Discography ==
- At a Ferghana Bazaar (Tutu, 1993)
- Art of the Duo with Geoff Warren (Tutu, 1996)
- The Eastern Legend (Boheme, 1998)
- Minaret (Boheme, 1999)
