= Heróis =

Single by Zero
- B-side: "100% Paixão"
- Released: 1985
- Recorded: 1985
- Genre: Post-punk, new wave
- Length: 3:22
- Label: CBS
- Songwriter(s): Guilherme Isnard
- Producer(s): Luiz Carlos Maluly

Zero singles chronology
| "Heróis" (1985) | "Agora Eu Sei" (1985) |

"Heróis" (Portuguese for "Heroes") is a single by Brazilian rock band Zero, released in 1985 by CBS Records International. It is Zero's first official release overall, and their only one to feature the band's first ever line-up, which lasted from their foundation in 1983 until circa 1985 – guitarists Fabio Golfetti and Nelson Coelho, drummer Cláudio Souza, bassist Beto Birger and saxophonist Gilles Eduar (who had already left Zero prior to the single's recording) would all depart the band to form projects of their own shortly after the single's release, with the only exception of vocalist Guilherme Isnard, the only founding member of the band to remain in its many different line-ups.

The single's title track would be re-recorded for Zero's 2000 compilation Electro-Acústico; both tracks of the single would also be included in the 2004 compilation of demos, rarities and early material Dias Melhores. An alternate take of "Heróis", with the longer title of "Heróis de Hamelin" ("Heroes from Hamelin"), recorded one year prior to the single's release, is also present in the compilation.

== Track listing ==
1. "Heróis" – 3:22
2. "100% Paixão" – 3:49

== Personnel ==
- Guilherme Isnard – vocals, sax
- Cláudio Souza – drums
- Alberto "Beto" Birger – bass guitar
- Nelson Coelho – electric guitar
- Fabio Golfetti – electric guitar
- Luiz Carlos Maluly – production
- Luís Crispino – photography, cover art
- Geraldo Alves Pinto – art direction
