= Grooves in the Temple =

Groove in the Temple

Studio album by Jorge Pescara
- Released: January 12, 2005
- Genre: Jazz fusion
- Length: 70:49
- Label: Jazz Station Records / Voiceprint UK
- Producer: Arnaldo DeSouteiro

Grooves in the Temple (released 2005) is an album by Brazilian bassist Jorge Pescara.

== Track listing ==
1. "Comin Home Baby" – 4:40
2. "Laura Lee" – 5:15
3. "Miles-Miller" – 6:11
4. "Kashmir" – 7:51
5. "Grooves in the Temple" – 5:34
6. "The Great Emperor of the Bass" – 4:41
7. "Power of Soul" – 7:03
8. "Funchal" – 6:49
9. "Sofisticada" – 3:55
10. "Meteor" – 3:54
11. "Black Widow" – 4:47
12. "Power of Soul VOCAL VERSION" – 4:48
13. "Kashmir VOCAL VERSION" – 5:22

== Personnel ==
- Dom Um Romão – drums
- Ithamara Koorax – vocals
- Luiz Bonfá – classical guitar
- Cláudio Zoli – guitar, soloist
- Eumir Deodato – Fender Rhodes, backing vocals
- Laudir de Oliveira – percussion
- João Paulo Mendonça – organ, Fender Rhodes, synthesizer, Mellotron, flute
- Paula Faour – Minimoog, soloist
- Alfredo Dias Gomes – drums
- Sidinho Moreira – percussion
- José Carlos Ramos – tenor and soprano saxophone, soloist
- Widor Santiago – baritone saxophone, soloist
- Cláudio Infente – drums
- Guilherme Isnard – vocals
- Sérgio Vid – vocals
- Jorge Pescara – electric bass, arranger, fretless bass, keyboards, backing vocals, executive producer, upright electric bass, E-bow, Chapman Stick
- Glauton Campello – keyboards, synthesizer Matrix Xpander, XP500, Fender Rhodes
- Nick Remo – drums
- Guto Goffi – drums
- Maurício Barros – Hammond organ with Leslie
- Manny Monteiro - drums
- Sérgio Nacif - drums
- João Palma - drums
- Cláudio Kote - guitar
- Dudu Caribé - guitar, soloist
- Roberto Marques - trombone
- Dino Rangel - guitar, soloist
- Mila Schiavo - percussion
- Akira Akurai - taiko
- Ricardo Brasil - percussion
- Vander Nascimento - flugelhorn, soloist
- Jefferson Nery - oboe
- Diógenes de Souza - French horn
- Sérgio Malafaia - bassoon
- André Gomes - sitar

== Production ==
- Arnaldo DeSouteiro – Producer, Mixing
- João Moreira – Engineer, Mixing
- Fábio Golfetti – Art Direction, Design
- Jorge Pescara – Executive Producer, Mixing
- Pete Turner – Photography
- Gustavo Victorino – Photography
- Lula Lavour – Engineer, Assistant Engineer
- Cury Heluy - Technical Supervisor
- Luis Fernando Grillo – Engineer
- Alfredo Dias Gomes – Engineer
- Douglas Payne – Liner Notes
- Geraldo Brandão – Mastering
- Victor Dias – Engineer
