= Bunker Touch Guitar =

Double-necked touch guitar

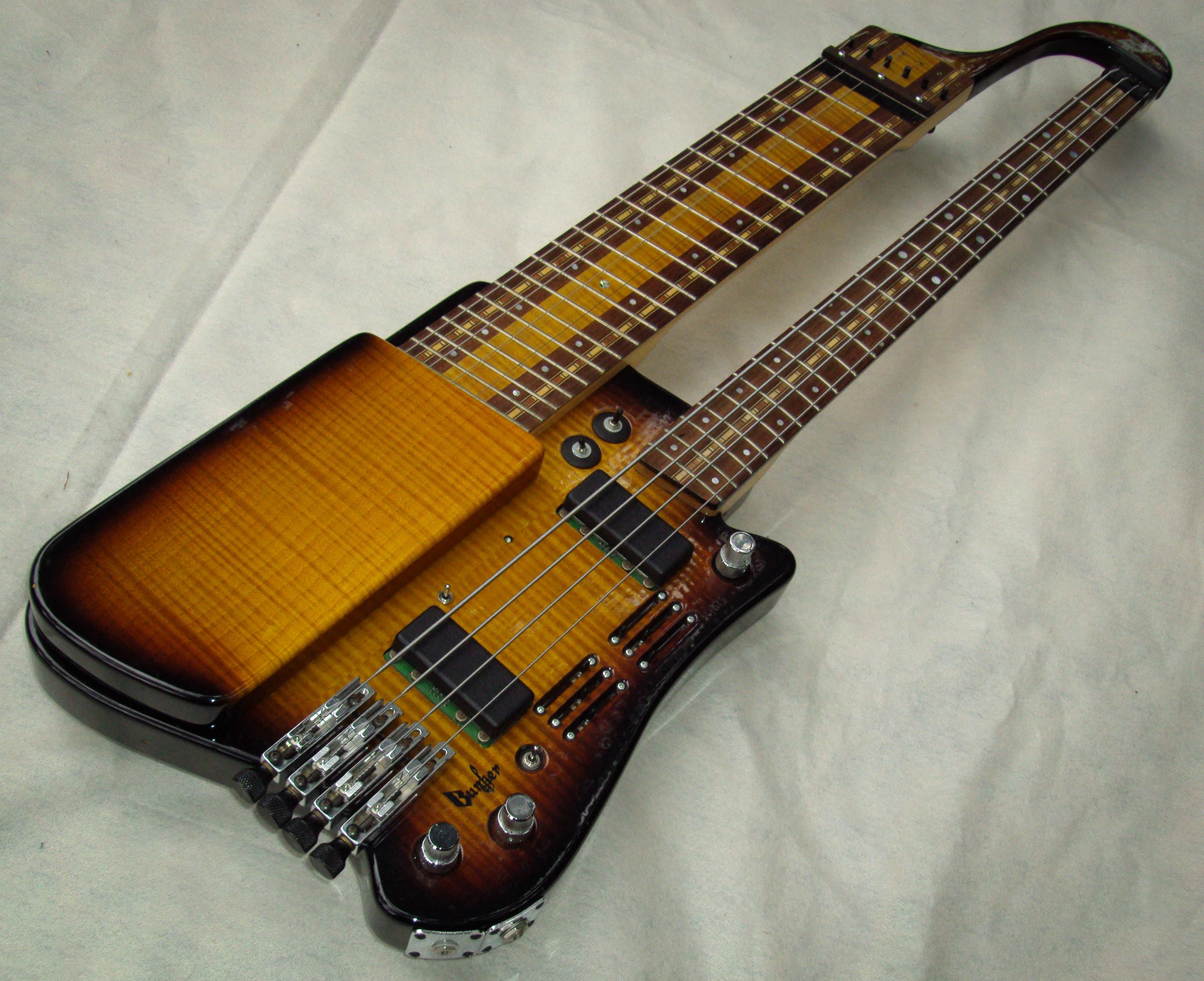

String instrument
- Classification: String
- Hornbostel–Sachs classification: 321.322 (Composite chordophone)
- Inventor: Dave Bunker
- Developed: 1985

Related instruments
- Warr Guitar; Chapman stick; Megatar

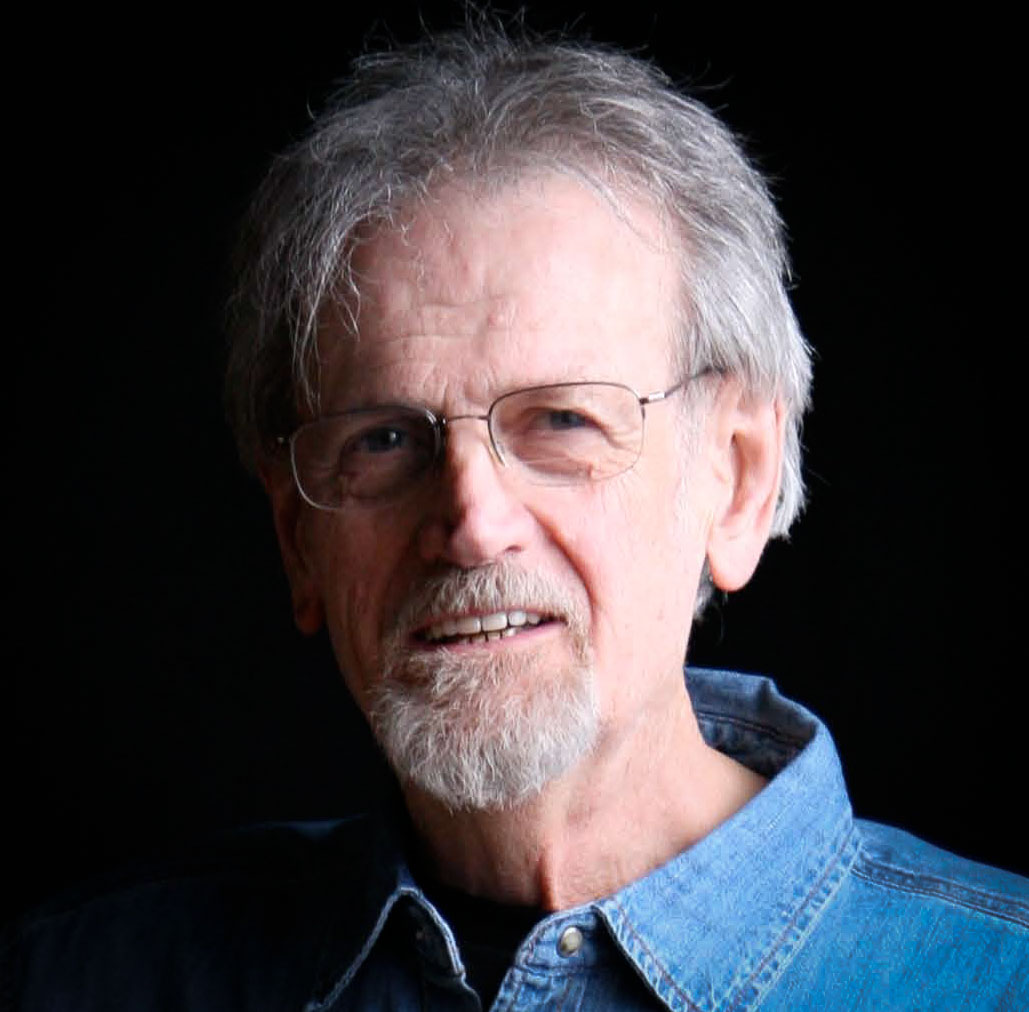
Dave Bunker

The Bunker Touch Guitar is a double-necked touch guitar developed by Dave Bunker.

== Development ==
Until guitarist Jimmie Webster first popularized his Illustrated Touch System in 1952, all guitars had been strummed. But with Webster's single-neck touch-style guitar and then Dave Bunker's headless, double-neck, DuoLectar touch guitar, these new instruments, while appearing similar to traditional strummed guitars, actually employed an innovative tapping technique.

Dave Bunker developed and patented the first double-necked tap/touch-style guitar, which he called the Duo'Lectar.

=== Duo'Lectar ===
"America the Beautiful" performed on the DuoLectar

The DuoLectar was conceived, built, and played by Dave Bunker in 1955. At the suggestion of Irby Mandrell (father of country singer Barbara Mandrell), Bunker changed the tuning configuration of the lower neck to conform to a standard bass. It was introduced to a live, national TV audience on the Ozark Jubilee, hosted by Eddy Arnold and Red Foley, and then in 1960, Bunker demonstrated his double-necked instrument for the Portland Oregonian newspaper.

With the addition of patented refinements, the Duo'Lectar became popularly known as the Bunker Touch Guitar.

The DuoLectar was later seen in headline shows at the Golden Nugget in Las Vegas from 1964 through 1974.

Because of its influence on the guitar industry, Seattle's EMP Museum (now called Museum of Pop Culture) displays a DuoLectar guitar and features a video interview with Dave Bunker.

=== Bunker Touch Guitar ===
In 1985, Bunker developed a specialized electronic mute for the instrument, later patented. This new configuration became known as the Bunker Touch Guitar.

== Play ==
Except for its twin necks, the Bunker Touch Guitar is similar in appearance to a typical guitar. However, it is dissimilar in its style of play. Strings on the Bunker Touch Guitar are not strummed or plucked, as in the traditional, single-necked guitar. Instead, all strings respond to touch or tap. On the Bunker Touch Guitar, a note sounds when a string is held down and stops when it is released. The left hand plays bass lines on the lower neck, while the right hand simultaneously plays lead lines on the upper neck. It has no head at the top end of the necks (as on conventional guitars) because its tuning keys are located at the base-edge of the instrument.

== Use ==
The importance of the early touch guitar to the standard single-neck guitar's evolution was acknowledged by its display at Seattle's Experience Music Project Museum (now called Museum of Pop Culture) when it opened in 2000. Dave Bunker detailed the development of his invention in a videotaped interview conducted by the museum. His uniquely designed touch guitar continued to mature, and was featured in headline shows at the Golden Nugget in Las Vegas from 1964 through 1974.

Selected patents incorporated specifically into the Bunker Touch Guitar have also been used in other contemporary guitar designs. The touch technique has been popularized by guitarists Eddie Van Halen, Stanley Jordan, Steve Vai, and Jeff Healey.

== Similar instruments ==
Some contemporary artists have gone forward to utilize the tapping method with their own touch-style guitars, including Emmett Chapman, Eddie Van Halen, Stanley Jordan, Steve Vai, Jeff Healey, Markus Reuter, Trey Gunn, Chuck Churchman, and Sergio Santucci. Despite this, the touch guitar genre is still a small segment of the industry. Manufacturers that produce the specialized instruments include Bunker Guitars, Warr Guitars, and Mobius (Magatar).

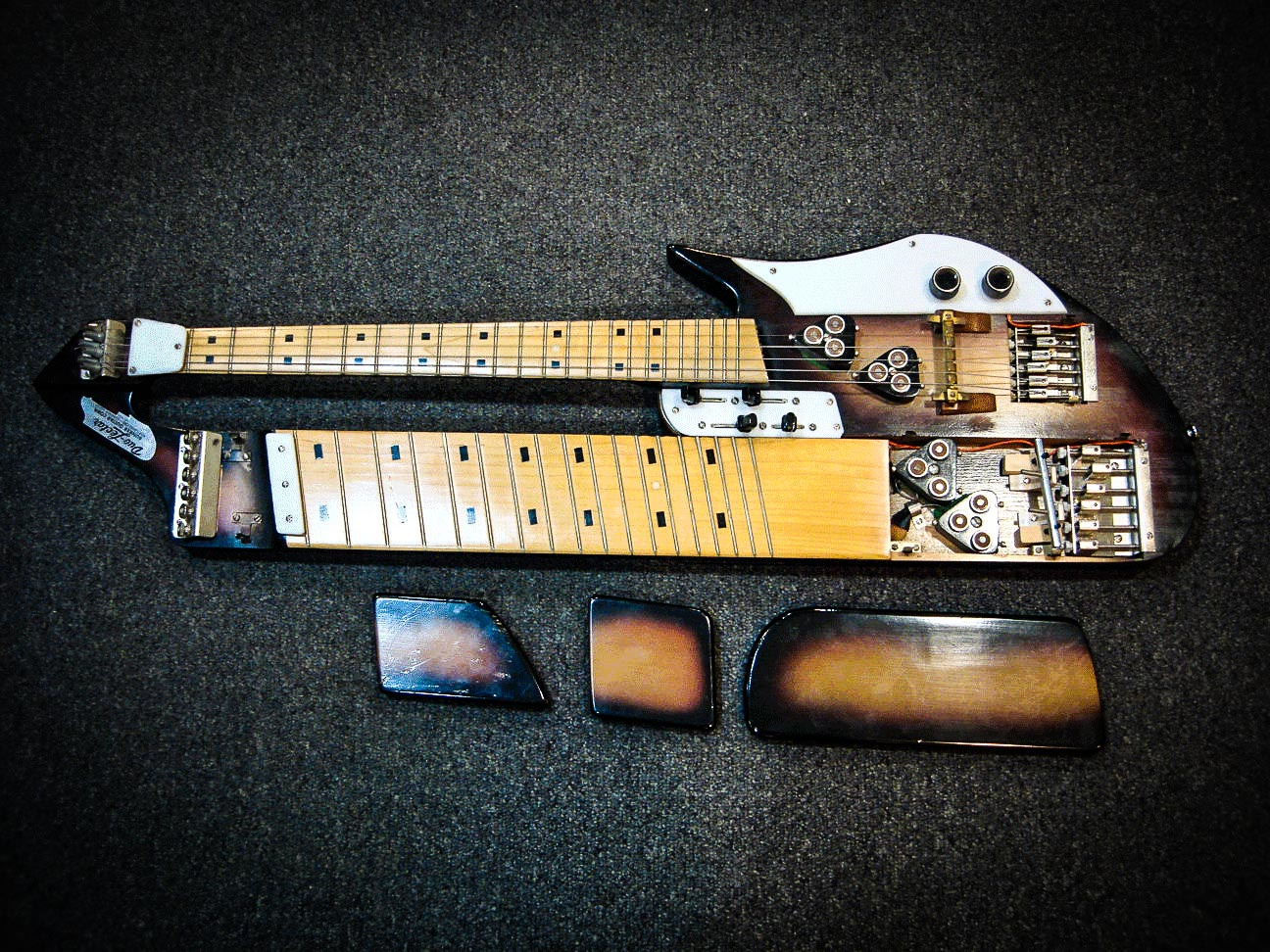
1961 Bunker Patented DuoLectar

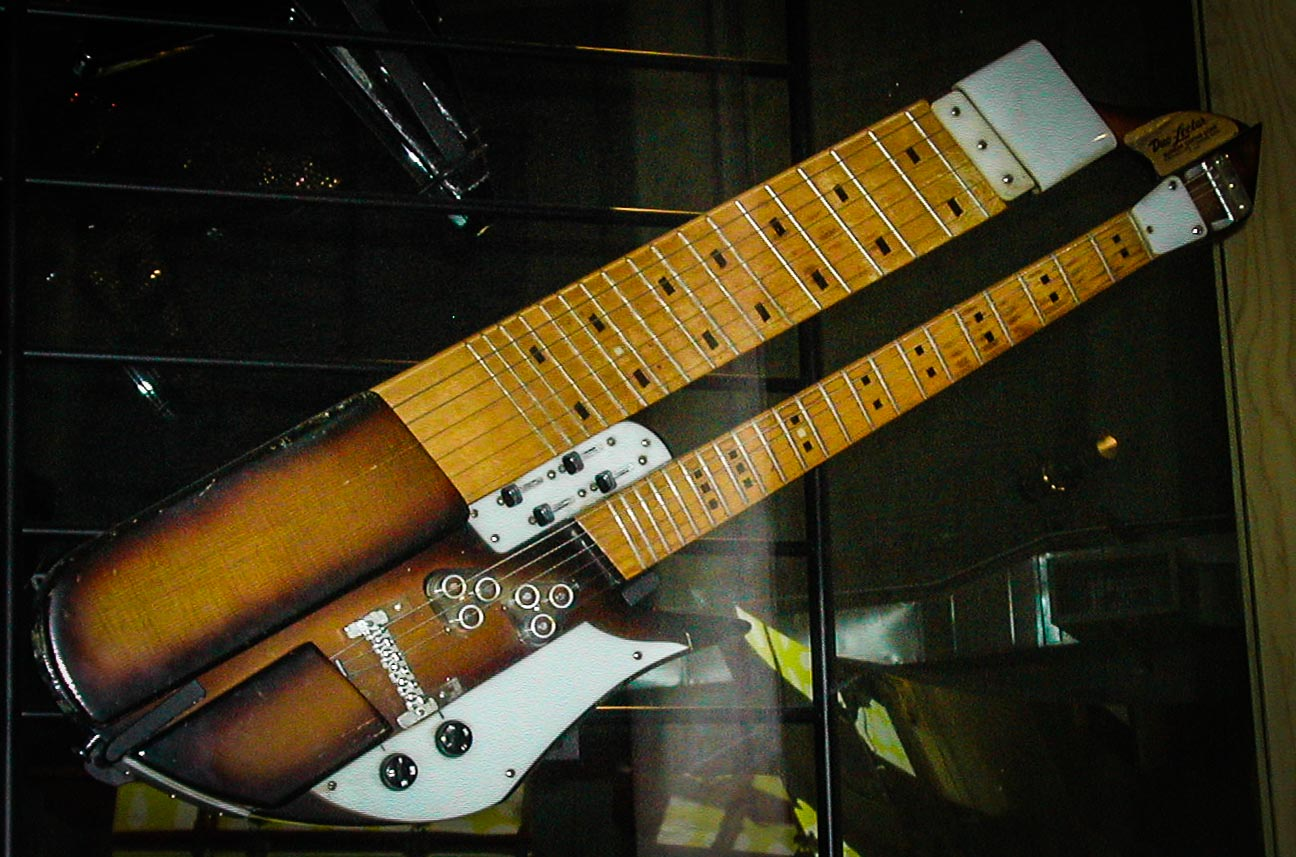
DuoLectar displayed at the Museum of Pop Culture, Seattle

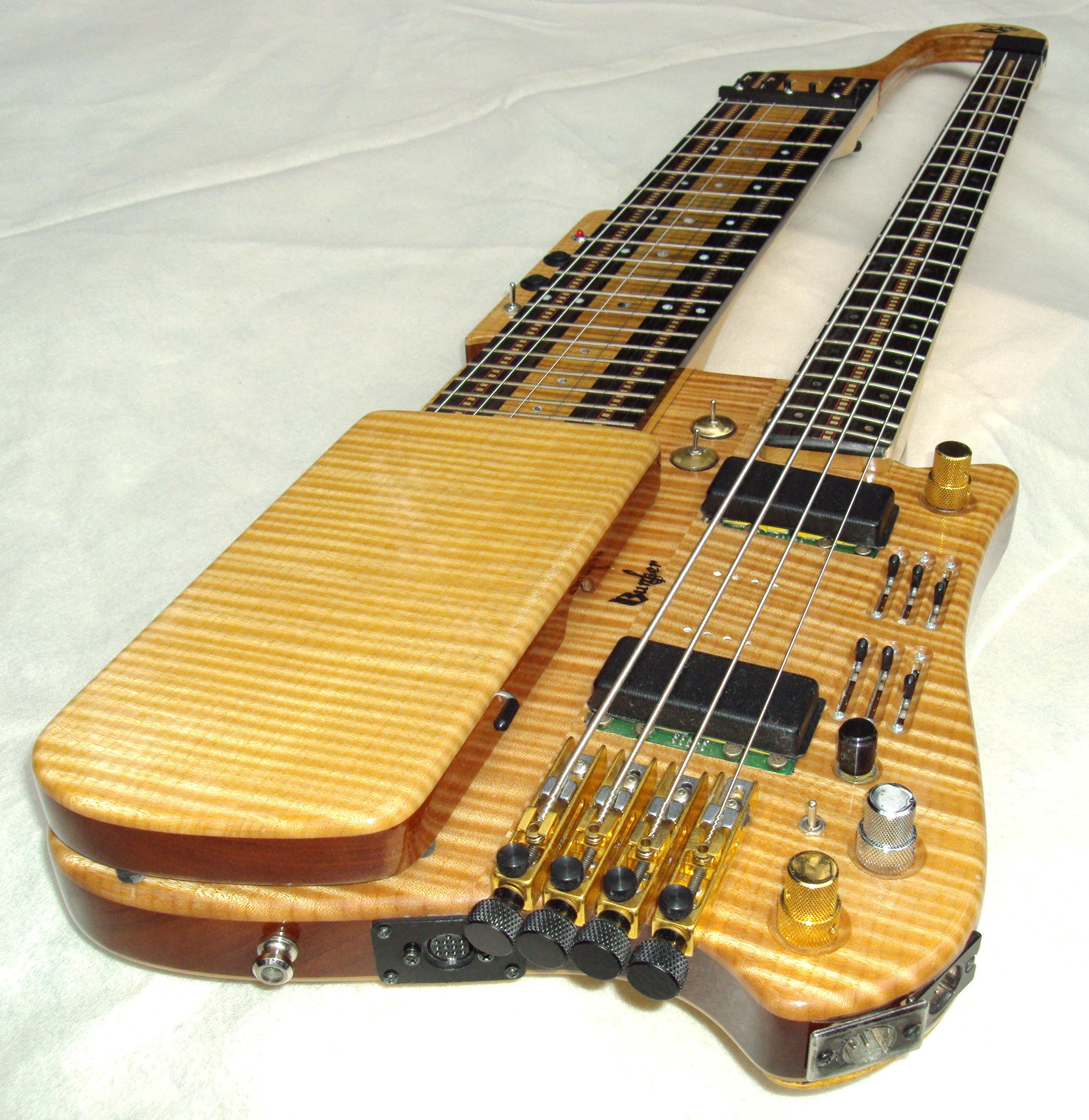
Twin necks define the Bunker Touch Guitar

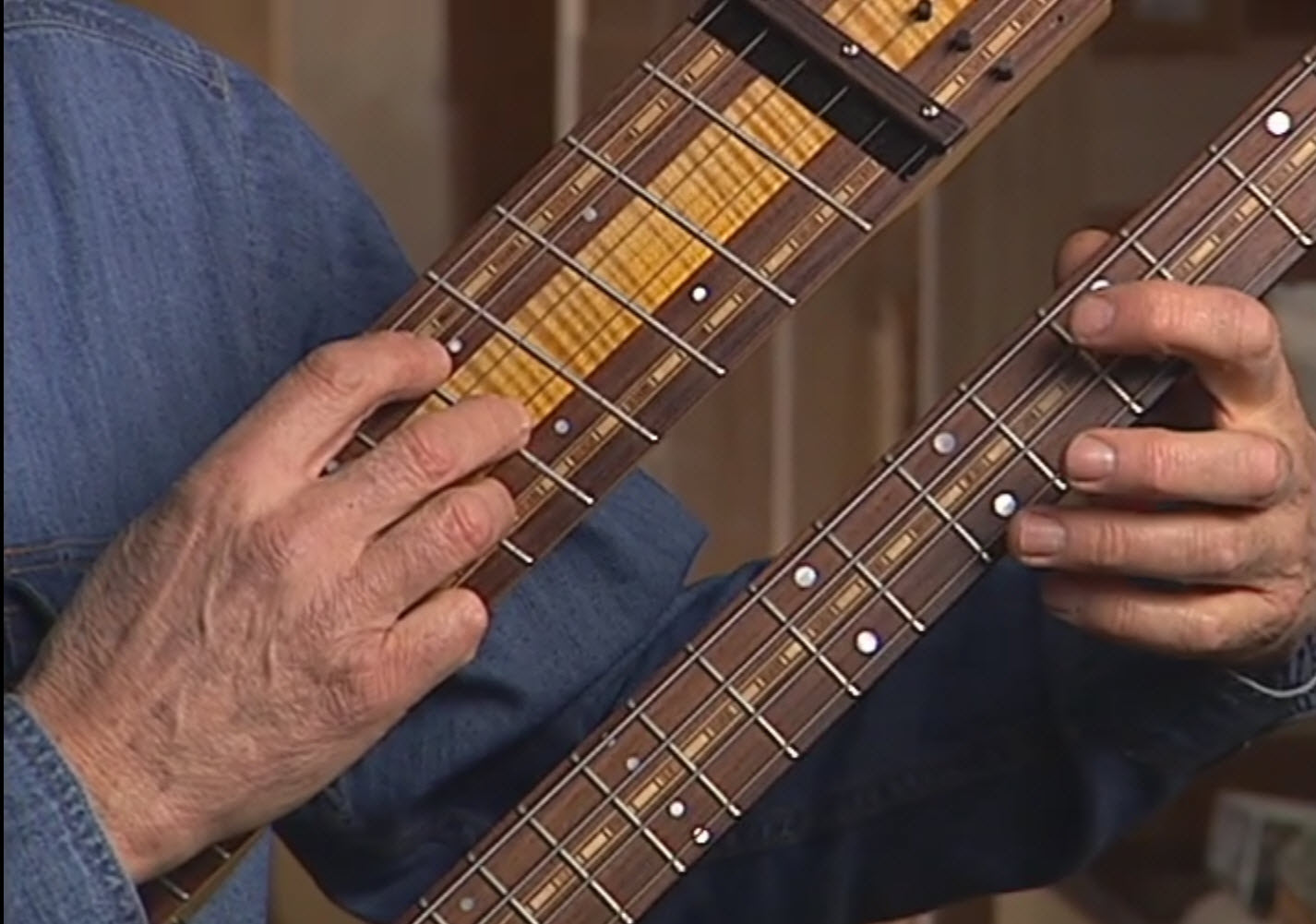
The left hand plays bass and the right hand plays lead, simultaneously and by touch

== See also ==
- List of string instruments
