= Quinto Elemento =

Studio album by Zero
- Released: August 30, 2007
- Recorded: 2006–07
- Genre: Alternative rock, art rock
- Label: Self-released
- Producer: JP Mendonça, Nilo Romero

Zero chronology
Dias Melhores (2004)	Quinto Elemento (2007)

Quinto Elemento (Portuguese for "Fifth Element") is the second studio album by Brazilian rock band Zero. Their first proper studio release in 20 years since Carne Humana in 1987, it was independently released on August 30, 2007. The band has uploaded early versions of each of the album's songs on their official Myspace as teasers.

The tracks "Em Volta do Sol", "Mentiras" and "Dedicatória" were re-recorded from their 2000 compilation Electro-Acústico.

== Track listing ==
All lyrics are written by Guilherme Isnard

No.	Title	Length
1.	"A Culpa Não É do Amor" (It's Not Love's Fault)	4:24
2.	"Nem Tão Longe, Nem Tão Perto" (Not So Far, Not So Close)	2:58
3.	"Os Anjos Dizem 'Amém'" (The Angels Say "Amen")	3:13
4.	"Pra Poder Dormir em Paz" (So I Can Sleep Peacefully)	3:37
5.	"Canção Proibida" (Forbidden Song)	3:24
6.	"Centúrias" (Quatrains)	3:51
7.	"Mentiras" (Lies)	3:48
8.	"Em Volta do Sol" (Around the Sun)	2:52
9.	"Dedicatória" (Dedicatory)	3:45
10.	"Terra de Ninguém" (No Man's Land)	5:45
11.	"Estrelas" (Stars)	3:34
12.	"Verdadeiro Amor" (True Love)	4:07
13.	"Gravidade Zero" (Zero Gravity)	3:55

== Personnel ==
- Guilherme Isnard – vocals
- Vitor Vidaut – drums
- Yan França – guitar
- Jorge Pescara – bass
- João Paulo "JP" Mendonça, Nilo Romero – production
- Eduardo Rocha – cover art
