= Agentss =

Brazilian electronic music band

- Origin: São Paulo, Brazil
- Genres: Post-punk, new wave, synth-pop, synth-rock, electronic, avant-garde, experimental
- Years active: 1980–1983
- Labels: WEA
- Past members: Kodiak Bachine; Eduardo Amarante; Miguel Barella; Lyses Pupo; Elias Glik; Thomas Susemihl

Agentss was a short-lived Brazilian new wave band formed in São Paulo in 1980, famous for their quirky science fiction-influenced visuals and lyrics which were sung in a dialect invented by frontman Kodiak Bachine called "elektrotranzlyriks" – a mixture of words in Portuguese, French, German, English and "extraterrestrial idioms".

Despite their short lifespan, they are considered to be the first Brazilian electronic group ever, and have a cult following to the present day.

== History ==
Brazilian musician and poet Kodiak Bachine founded Agentss in 1980; prior to that, he had a progressive rock band named Abaddon, which came to an end in 1978. In 1979, Bachine travelled to the United States, where he got in touch with the thriving English-speaking new wave/post-punk scene, and after returning to Brazil he decided to form a band which would mirror his influences, such as Bauhaus, The Cure, The Residents, Television, Gary Numan, Blondie, The B-52's, Talking Heads and, above all, Kraftwerk and Devo.

Agentss' initial line-up consisted of Bachine on vocals and synthesizers, Eduardo Amarante and Miguel Barella on guitars, Lyses Pupo on bass and Elias Glik on drums; their first work was a self-released, self-titled extended play which came out in 1981 and contained two songs: "Agentss" and "Angra", the latter one being a reference to the Angra Nuclear Power Plant. (Pupo and Glik, however, did not play on the EP.) Their first live performance was also in the same year.

In 1983, Lyses Pupo left the band and was replaced by Thomas Susemihl; with this new line-up Agentss released their second and last EP, containing the tracks "Professor Digital" and "Cidade Industrial"; it was released by WEA (present-day Warner Music Group) and produced by famous record producer Pena Schmidt. More shows around São Paulo came afterwards.

Alleging "philosophical reasons", Bachine ended the band in late 1983.

After Agentss ended, its former members started numerous other bands: Thomas Susemihl and Eduardo Amarante would form another pioneering new wave band, Azul 29 (after it ended, Amarante joined New Romantic post-punk band Zero), while Miguel Barella formed Voluntários da Pátria; he later joined Akira S. e as Garotas que Erraram.

Bachine began a solo career in 1985; his debut album (and only release so far), Kom Licença, Vou Rezar..., came out in the same year.

Lyses Pupo died in 2002.

== Line-up ==
- Kodiak Bachine – vocals, keyboards (1980–1983)
- Eduardo Amarante – guitar (1980–1983)
- Miguel Barella – guitar (1980–1983)
- Lyses Pupo – bass (1980–1983; died 2002)
- Elias Glik – drums (1980–1983)
- Thomas Susemihl – bass (1983)

== Discography ==
=== Extended plays ===
- 1981: Agentss/Angra
- 1983: Professor Digital/Cidade Industrial

=== Compilations ===
- 2005: Não Wave

Featured the song "Agentss".
