= Azul 29 =

Brazilian new wave band

- Origin: São Paulo, Brazil
- Genres: New wave, synthpop, synthrock
- Years active: 1982–1985
- Label: WEA
- Past members: Thomas Susemihl; Eduardo Amarante; Malcolm Oakley; Thomas Bielefeld

Azul 29 (Portuguese for Blue 29) was a short-lived Brazilian new wave band, founded in 1982 by two former members of synthpop band Agentss. They are famous for their 1984 hit "Videogame".

== History ==
Azul 29 was founded in the city of São Paulo in April 1982, by Agentss guitarist Eduardo Amarante and Thomas Bielefeld. Their first recording was the song "Ciências Sensuais". After Agentss disbanded in 1983, Amarante and Bielefeld were joined by Malcolm Oakley and Thomas "Miko" Susemihl (who also played for Agentss). In the same year, they released a self-titled EP via WEA (present-day Warner Music Group), containing the tracks "Metrópole" and "Olhar".

In 1984, they released a second self-titled EP, also via WEA, containing the songs "Videogame" and "O Teu Nome em Neon". In this EP, the electronic elements in their music were noticeably more prominent than in their previous release. "Videogame" became Azul 29's greatest hit after being used in the soundtrack of the popular 1984 film Bete Balanço, directed by Lael Rodrigues.

Despite their success, the band disbanded in 1985. Subsequently, both Oakley and Amarante joined the New Romantic post-punk band Zero.

On August 18, 2016, it was announced that Thomas Bielefeld had died at his hometown of Pindamonhangaba, after suffering from heart and respiratory failure.

== Line-up ==
- Thomas Bielefeld – vocals, keyboards (1982–1985; died 2016)
- Eduardo Amarante – guitar, keyboards (1982–1985)
- Thomas "Miko" Susemihl – bass (1983–1985)
- Malcolm Oakley – drums (1983–1985)

== Discography ==
=== Singles ===
- 1982: "Ciências Sensuais"

=== Extended plays ===
- 1983: Azul 29
- 1984: Azul 29

=== Compilations ===
- 2005: Não Wave

Featured the song "Ciências Sensuais".
