= Professor Digital/Cidade Industrial =

EP by Agentss
- Released: 1983
- Genre: Post-punk, new wave, electronic, synthpop
- Label: WEA
- Producer: Pena Schmidt

Agentss chronology
Agentss (1981)	Professor Digital/Cidade Industrial (1983)

Professor Digital/Cidade Industrial is an extended play by Brazilian new wave band Agentss. It was released through WEA in 1983, and was their second and last release before their break-up in the same year.

The EP is notable for being one of the first records in Brazil to have a computer-generated cover art; it was provided by an old VAX-11/780 minicomputer.

== Track listing ==
All tracks are written by Kodiak Bachine

No.	Title	Length
1.	"Professor Digital" (Digital Professor)	3:49
2.	"Cidade Industrial" (Industrial City)	3:52

== Personnel ==
- Kodiak Bachine – vocals, keyboards
- Miguel Barella – guitar
- Eduardo Amarante – guitar
- Thomas Susemihl – bass
- Elias Glik – drums
- Pena Schmidt – production
- Ivo Barreto – sound engineering
