= Passos no Escuro =

EP by Zero
- Released: 1985
- Genre: Post-punk, new wave
- Label: EMI
- Producer: Maurício Valladares, Zero

Zero chronology
Passos no Escuro (1985)	Carne Humana (1987)

Passos no Escuro (Portuguese for "Footsteps in the Dark") is an extended play by the Brazilian rock band Zero. It came out in 1985 by EMI.

The EP was a massive commercial success, to the point of receiving a Gold Certification by Pro-Música Brasil, and spawned the hit singles "Formosa" and "Agora Eu Sei"; the latter counted with a guest appearance by RPM vocalist Paulo Ricardo on backing vocals. Music videos would also be made for those tracks.

== Track listing ==
No.	Title	Lyrics	Length
1.	"Cada Fio, um Sonho" (Each String, a Dream)	Freddy Haiat, Guilherme Isnard, Rick Villas-Boas	4:13
2.	"Agora Eu Sei" (Now I Know; feat. Paulo Ricardo)	Freddy Haiat, Guilherme Isnard	4:44
3.	"Formosa" (Beautiful)	Eduardo Amarante, Freddy Haiat, Guilherme Isnard	4:21
4.	"Os Olhos Falam" (The Eyes Speak)	Beto Birger, Cláudio Souza, Fabio Golfetti, Guilherme Isnard, Nelson Coelho	3:58
5.	"Passos no Escuro" (Footsteps in the Dark)	Beto Birger, Guilherme Isnard, Rick Villas-Boas	4:03
6.	"Quero te Contar" (I Want to Tell You)	Eduardo Amarante, Freddy Haiat, Guilherme Isnard	4:24

== Personnel ==
- Guilherme Isnard – vocals, alto sax (on tracks 1, 2 and 4), photography, cover art
- Eduardo Amarante – guitars
- Athos Costa – drums
- Ricardo "Rick" Villas-Boas – bass
- Alfred "Freddy" Haiat – keyboard
- Paulo Ricardo – backing vocals (on track 2)
- Maurício Valladares – production
- José Celso – mixing
