= Megatar =

Stringed musical instrument

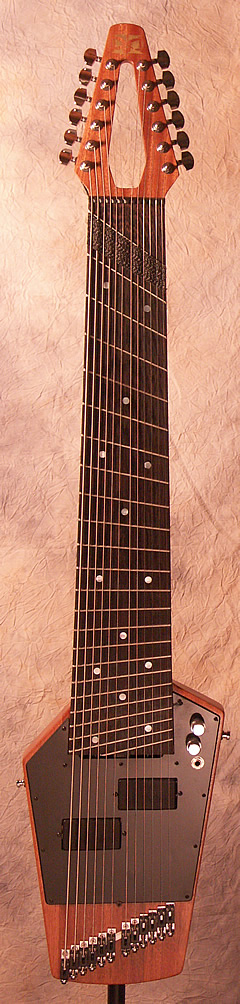
- Mobius Megatar ToneWeaver Dual Two-Handed Tapping Musical Instrument

String instrument
- Classification: String
- Hornbostel–Sachs classification: 321.322 (Composite chordophone)

Related instruments
- Warr Guitar; Chapman stick; Duo'Lectar

The Megatar is a stringed musical instrument designed to be played using a two-handed tapping technique. It is manufactured by the American company Mobius Megatar.

== Description ==
The Megatar is a fretted instrument with 12 strings, divided in two sections of six, where one set of strings is for bass and the other for melody. Both sides are normally tuned in fourths intervals. Other tunings and setups are common. The scale length is similar to an electric bass guitar. It uses electronic pickups that should be connected to an amplifier to produce sound. The instruments have two embedded, dual-action truss rods and a stereo 1/4" output. The Megatars are usually made with bolt-on necks. However, from 2007, all new instruments are exclusively "neck-through". All models are either built from light-colored maple and alder or premium dark woods like mahogany, sapele, wenge, and rosewood.

A redesigned version was released in 2014.

== Models ==
There are several models of the Megatar available, the "TrueTapper" and the "MaxTapper" being the basic models. One model, the "ToneWeaver", is equipped with the Ralph Novak "Fanned Frets" System. The "MidiTapper" is also equipped with a MIDI pickup system, which can drive synthesizers. The "Piezo-tapper" has GraphTech "Acoustiphonic" piezo pickups installed. A Megatar LapTapper comes with a custom table-top support system built in, so that the instrument can be played on a table or stand, like a keyboard.

== See also ==
- Touch guitar
- Chapman Stick
- Warr Guitar
- Jorge Pescara
