= Jorge Pescara =

Brazilian musician (born 1966)

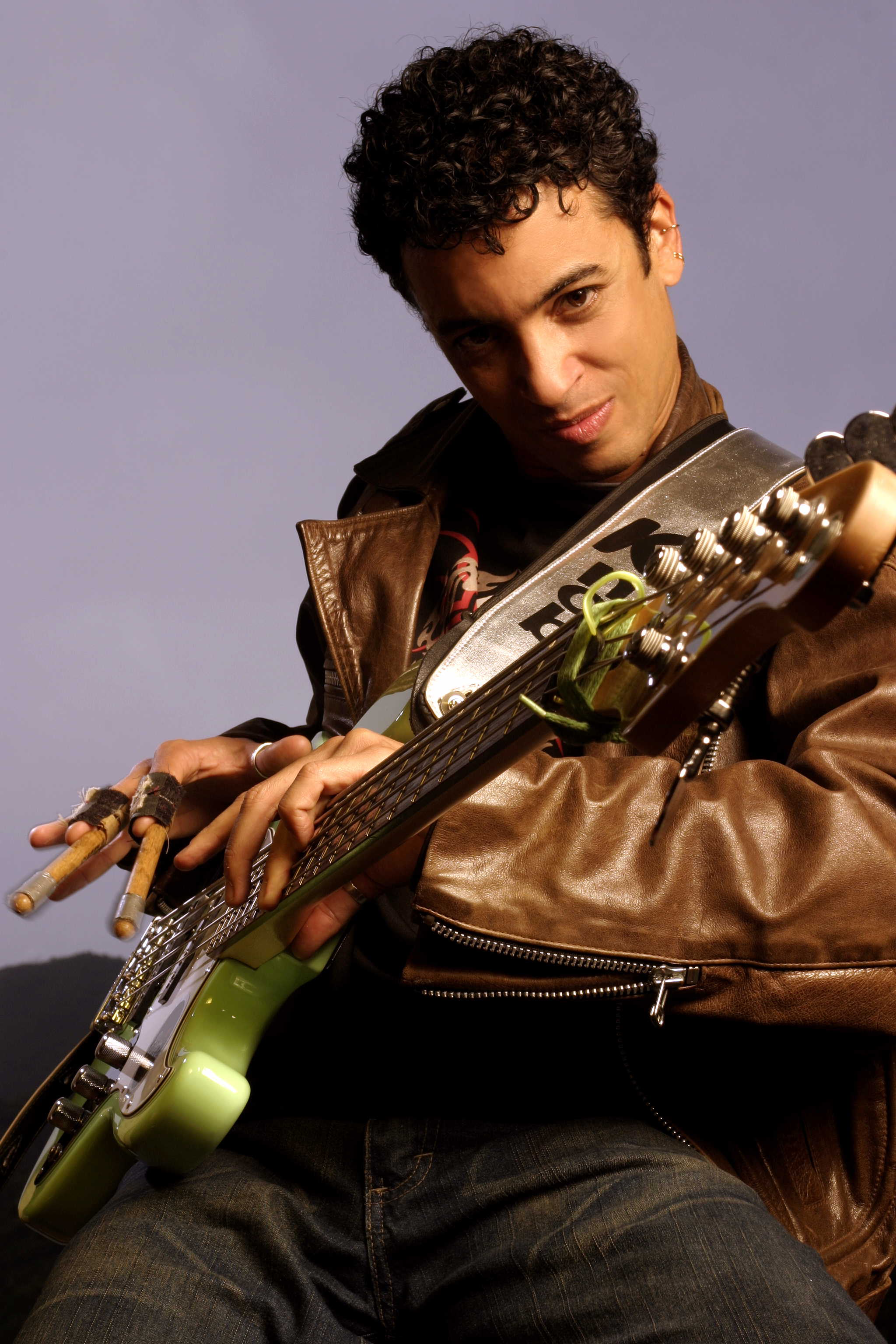
- Pescara in 2005

Background information
- Born: Jorge Luiz Pescara; 14 January 1966 (age 60); Sto André, São Paulo
- Genres: Progressive rock; jazz fusion; experimental; Brazilian jazz
- Occupations: Bandleader; composer
- Instruments: Bass guitar; fretless bass; upright bass; Megatar Touchbass; Chapman Stick
- Years active: 1998—present

Jorge Pescara (born 14 January 1966) is a Brazilian bassist and Megatar player specializing in jazz fusion, progressive rock, experimental music, and Brazilian jazz.

== Setup ==
- Basses: D'Alegria Defender Jorge Pescara signature 5str bass; Condor BC8000JP (prototype) fretless 8str;
- Touchguitars: Megatar Toneweaver 12str; Megatar Dragon 12str (NST tuning); Paschalis touch 12str (Stick tenor tuning)
- Strings: Elixir Nanoweb to Bass (.030, .045, .065, .085, .105, .130); plus super light to Megatar (009, 011, 016, 024, 032, 042)
- Amp: StudioR Z900 power amp
- Effects: Line6 FM4; BassWorks preamp bass modeler; Zoom G2.1U; Boss RC2; GR33 Roland Midi to synth; JP signature Bass Compressor by Rock It!; Triton Envelope Filter (Ed's Mod Shop); Moby Dick Bass Fuzz (Ed's Mod Shp); Danelectro Fab Echo; Behringer Ultra Octaver; Boss Compressor CS3; Boss Compressor CS2
- Miscellaneous: Hot Hands by Source Audio, Hi EBow; Funk Fingers; Dunlop (plectros & picks); violin bow; Roland EV5 pedal

== Selected discography ==

=== Contributions ===
- Leila (Correndo Perigo) Mix House / Eldorado 1995
- Geisan Varne (Caldeirao de Arruda) Seven Gates records 1996
- Renato Grinberg (Caetano Sem Palavras) Camerati discos 1996
- Mello Jr. (Plugged) Indie 1997
- Laura Finocchiaro (Eco Glitter) Dabliu / Eldorado 1997
- Jadir de Castro (Ziriguidum... e Deus Criou o Samba!) Jazz Station records 1998
- Flor de Lis (Flordelis) Gospel Music 1998
- Celso Fonseca (Out of the Blues "single") Geleia Geral 1998
- Edu Helou (Ser) H. Music 1999
- Fabio Pestana (Faces) SETO ES 2000
- Street Angels (A Benefit Album...) Mr. Bongo UK / Jazz Station records 2000
- Dom Um Romao (Lake of Perseverance) Jazz Station records / IRMA Italy 2001
- Compilation (Gradation Transition) IRMA Italy 2001
- JSR All Stars (Friends From Brazil 2001) Jazz Station records / IRMA Italy 2001
- Pingarilho (Stories & Dreams) Jazz Station records 2002
- Dom Um Romao (Nu Jazz Meets Brazil) Jazz Station records / IRMA Italy 2002
- Brazil All Stars (Rio Strut) Jazz Station Records / Milestone records 2002
- Compilation (A Day in Rimini) Jazz Station Records / IRMA Italy 2002
- Chill Out Wear (Chill Out Wear) IRMA Italy 2002
- Cool Jazzy cuts with Brazilian flavour (Sister Bossa vol 3) IRMA Italy 2002
- Dom Um Romao (Groovystation EP) IRMA Italy 2003
- Ithamara Koorax (Someday the Ballad album) King records / JSR 2003
- Ithamara Koorax (Love Dance the Ballad album) Milestone records / Fantasy 2003
- Lord K (Com Ropa) K & Rivero Produções 2003
- Cool Jazzy cuts with Brazilian Flavour (Sister Bossa vol 4) IRMA Italy 2003
- Various Artists (Chill Out Cafe vol 9) IRMA Italy 2004
- Luiz Bertoni (Constante Movimento EP) Giraffe Dying records 2005
- Various Artists (Brazilia the Very Best of the New Brazilia Sound) IRMA Italy 2005
- Ithamara Koorax (The Best Of Ithamara Koorax) JSR / EMI 2006
- Ithamara Koorax (O Vento) IRMA Italy 2006
- Zero (Quinto Elemento) C&C Celebration 2007
- Compilation (Bajista) Bajista Magazine 2007
- Ithamara Koorax (Brazilian Butterfly) IRMA Italy 2007
- Mobius Megatar (TouchStyle Cd) Megatar cd 2007
- Elixir strings (Brazilian Great Music vol II) Elixir Brazilian's endorsees cd 2007
- Ithamara Koorax (Brasil Canta com Ithamara Koorax) Cedem 2008
- Sallaberry (Sambatuque) Tum Tum Home Music 2009
- Ithamara Koorax & Mamoru Morishita Singer & Songer records 2011
- Sallaberry (New Bossa) Tum Tum Home Music 2011
- Paulo Moura (Paulo Moura & André Sachs - Fruto Maduro) Biscoito Fino 2012
- Ithamara Koorax (Got \to Be Real) IRMA records 2012
- Sallaberry (Rhythmist) Tum Tum Home Music 2013
- Dialeto (The Last Tribe) Moonjune, 2013
- LinhAmarela (Sol de Refletor) Nowa Music 2014

=== Solo ===
- Grooves in the Temple (2005)
- Knight Without Armour (2012)
- Grooves in the Eden (2018)

== Books ==
Pescara is the author of several bass instructional books.

- Arthur Maia Transcriptions (by MPO 1995)
- Curso TKT de Contrabaixo Elétrico (by TKT editora 1999)
- Contrabaixo Completo para Iniciantes (by Irmãos Vitale editora 2004) ISBN 85-7407-183-8
- O Dicionário Brasileiro de Contrabaixo Elétrico (by editora H. Sheldon 2005)
- Coleção Toque de Mestre - Harmônicos (by HMP editora 2006)
- Contrabaixo Completo – Manual do Groove (by Irmãos Vitale editora 2008) ISBN 978-85-7407-235-7

== Videos ==
- O Contrabaixo Completo (by MPO video 1994)
