= Biquini =

Brazilian rock band

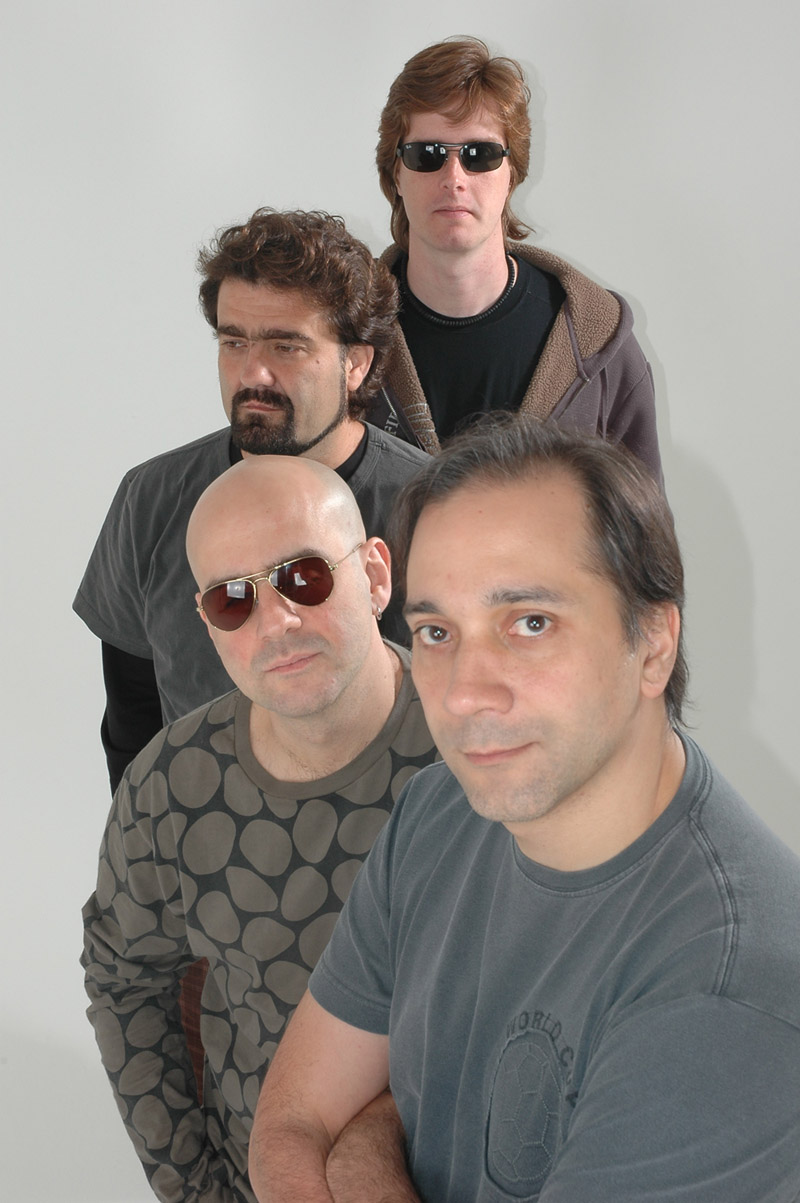

Background information
- Origin: Brazil
- Genres: Post-punk, new wave, pop rock, reggae rock, MPB, soft rock, synth rock, brazilian rock
- Years active: 1985–present
- Labels: Polydor, Epic, Ariola, BMG, Universal, Deckdisc, Som Livre, Warner, Sony, Coqueiro Verde Records
- Members: Bruno Gouveia; Carlos Coelho; Miguel Flores; Álvaro Birita
- Past members: André Sheik
- Website: www.biquini.com.br

Biquini, previously known as Biquini Cavadão, is a Brazilian rock band formed in 1985 in Rio de Janeiro. They are a very influential 1980s band that still continues successful to this day.

== History ==
Biquini Cavadão is the name of a tiny cut-a-way bikini well known in Brazilian beaches during the eighties. It is also the name of one of the most famous bands in Brazil in the last thirty years, with more than one million copies of their albums sold, with more than two thousand shows nationwide, as well as abroad. Bruno Gouveia (vocals), Miguel Flores (keyboards), Álvaro Birita (drums) and André Sheik (bass), after one year presenting gigs in high school parties, mostly covers from emerging Brazilian bands, decided to make their own music. With a great help from Carlos Beni (Kid Abelha's former drummer) and Herbert Vianna (Os Paralamas do Sucesso), who actually named the band, their first song ever air played, "Tédio", became an instant hit. Signed by Polydor and with the inclusion of guitar player Carlos Coelho, they released their debut single at that same year and in 1986, they released their first album, Cidades em Torrente. They released two more albums in the eighties (A Era da Incerteza and Zé) with minor hits than its predecessor.

Things changed radically in beginning of the nineties with their fourth album. With Descivilização, they hit the charts with three songs: "Zé Ninguém", "Vento Ventania" and "Impossível". As a consequence, they opened the night for Alice in Chains and Red Hot Chili Peppers in Morumbi Stadium, São Paulo and Apoteose Square, Rio de Janeiro, for the Hollywood Rock event for more than 60 thousand people, in 1993. They released two more albums (Agora and biquini.com.br) during the decade, always with great hits ("Chove Chuva", a Jorge Ben cover, and "Janaína") and minor singles ("Sabor do Sol" and "Ilusão"). A RockBook telling the story of the band and including 20 hits for guitar playing was released in October 1996 to celebrate their first decade. Pioneer entrepreneurs, they were the first Brazilian band to have an e-mail to keep direct contact with their fans, and the first Brazilian group to have an official website. Their one "greatest hits" album O Melhor do Biquini Cavadão achieved platinum and gold marks in Brazil. The album biquini.com.br was the first ever in Brazil to attach a multimedia soft kit to access the Internet, sponsored by Unisys. In 2000, they released Escuta Aqui acclaimed by the critics as one of the best albums of the band, headed by the title track. Always one step ahead, the album was the first one to have the recording sessions broadcast via Internet using a webcam and also with a recording's diary (or what we call today "blog"). Another partnership, this time with Apple Computer Brazil, sponsored the media kit, including videos and a complete database of their shows since 1985. After 15 years together they faced their first crisis and the group was reduced to a quartet, with Bruno, Miguel, Alvaro and Coelho.

Biquini Cavadão in 2001 also played for 250 thousand people in the last night of Rock in Rio III, coincidentally headlined again by Red Hot Chili Peppers. After seven CDs containing mostly their own songs, the band decided to record their first cover album. Named 80, the group revisited contemporary Brazilian bands, such as Os Paralamas do Sucesso, Engenheiros do Hawaii, Barão Vermelho, Kid Abelha and RPM. The single Múmias", again hit the charts, in a duet with Renato Russo, lead singer of Legião Urbana, who recorded this track with Biquini in their first album. Renato died in 1996, victim of HIV/AIDS, but thanks to Direct to Disk Digital Recordings, he reappeared in this new version. In 2002 "Quando Te Encontrar", featured in Malhação, TV Globo's soap opera, took the FM Radios by surprise in the country and gave the band another hit single. In 2005, they released their first live album. The CD/DVD Biquíni Cavadão ao Vivo achieved diamond and celebrated the band's 20th birthday. Three hit singles proved that the band conquered a new generation of fans, not only those from the eighties: "Vou Te Levar Comigo", "Quanto Tempo Demora Um Mês" and "Dani". The tour again covered the entire country and they also played some dates in the United States. In 2007, the band decided to open their own label and released three albums at the same time. Só Quem Sonha Acordado Vê o Sol Nascer brings new hits like "Em Algum Lugar No Tempo" while Sucessos Regravados gives new flavours to their greatest hits.

In 2008, they recorded their second DVD, 80 Vol. 2 ao Vivo no Circo Voador, a sequel of their album released in 2001, live in Circo Voador, Rio de Janeiro and with Claudia Leitte among many other guest appearances. After five years releasing singles, predicting a new way of working in the music business, they released Roda-Gigante. Its title track was a nominee for the best Brazilian song in Latin Grammys 2013. They toured extensively and released another double CD and DVD. Me Leve Sem Destino was recorded in Goiânia to celebrate their 30th anniversary and released by Sony Music. After touring for two years, the work with producer Liminha for the release of As Voltas Que o Mundo Dá in 2017, giving new concepts for what started as something naive in the last century. Finally, in the end of 2018, the released Ilustre Guerreiro, an homage to Herbert Vianna, lead singer and composer of the group Os Paralamas do Sucesso, starting a new tour throughout the country

== Discography ==
=== Studio albums ===
- (1986) Cidades em Torrente
- (1987) A Era da Incerteza
- (1989) Zé
- (1991) Descivilização
- (1994) Agora
- (1998) biquini.com.br
- (2000) Escuta Aqui
- (2001) 80
- (2007) Só Quem Sonha Acordado Vê o Sol Nascer
- (2007) Sucessos Regravados
- (2013) Roda-Gigante
- (2017) As Voltas Que o Mundo Dá
- (2018) Ilustre Guerreiro
- (2021) Através dos Tempos

=== Live/video albums ===
- (2005) Ao Vivo
- (2008) 80 Vol. 2 - Ao Vivo no Circo Voador
- (2014) Me Leve Sem Destino
- (2020) Ilustre Guerreiro - Ao Vivo
