= Carne Humana (album) =

Studio album by Zero
- Released: January 16, 1987
- Genres: Post-punk, new wave
- Label: EMI
- Producer: Paul Mounsey

Zero chronology
Passos no Escuro (1985)	Carne Humana (1987)	Electro-Acústico (2000)

Carne Humana (Portuguese for "Human Flesh") is the first studio album by Brazilian rock band Zero, following their EP Passos no Escuro. It came out in 1987 by EMI. Even though it was not as commercially successful as Passos no Escuro, the album spawned the hit singles "Quimeras" and "A Luta e o Prazer". Despite not being released as a single, "Abuso de Poder" was also a very memorable track, being that it criticized the Brazilian military government (which had ended only two years prior to the album's release). The album also includes the only song by Zero written in English, "Game Over".

A music video was made for "Quimeras"; it was recorded at the site of the Electric Power Research Center in Rio de Janeiro.

Since the band would eventually break up in 1989, it would be their only studio album for a long time; however, they reunited in 1998 and released a follow-up, Quinto Elemento, in 2007.

== Track listing ==
All lyrics are written by Guilherme Isnard, except where noted.

No.	Title	Lyrics	Length
1.	"Algum Vício" (Some Vice)		5:02
2.	"Quimeras" (Chimerae)		4:35
3.	"Linha da Vida" (Lifeline)		4:13
4.	"Abuso de Poder" (Power Abuse)	Celso Fonseca, Guilherme Isnard	4:52
5.	"Medo de Voar" (Fear of Flying)		5:27
6.	"Carne Humana" (Human Flesh)		4:46
7.	"Seu Planeta" (Your Planet)		3:48
8.	"Game Over"	Guilherme Isnard, Luiz Sérgio Toledo	3:57
9.	"Sem Pudor" (Without Any Pudency)		4:16
10.	"A Luta e o Prazer" (The Struggle and the Pleasure)	Ronaldo Bastos	5:01

== Personnel ==
- Guilherme Isnard – vocals
- Eduardo Amarante – guitars
- Malcolm Oakley – drums
- Ricardo "Rick" Villas-Boas – bass
- Alfred "Freddy" Haiat – keyboard
- Paul Mounsey – production
- Jorge Davidson – art direction
- Mayrton Bahia – executive production
