= May East =

- Born: 29 January 1956 (age 70)
- Genres: World music; Electronica le-ie Tribal
- Occupation: Singer-songwriter
- Instruments: Vocals; keyboards
- Years active: 1978–2002
- Labels: EMI; Wop-Bop; Eldorado; Universal

May East (also known as Maria Elisa Capparelli Pinheiro) is a British/Brazilian urbanist, educator, singer and songwriter. Over the years she has considered herself an artivist.

== Early musical career ==
East comes from an artistic community stretching between São Paulo and Rio de Janeiro, Brazil. East's art expressed a deep concern for Brazil's environment both in the major cities and the country's interior, specially the rainforests of the Amazon.

East started her career as a singer in the band Gang 90 & Absurdettes in 1981. Their songs mixed new-wave with beatnik poetry and a female choir, inspired by the new-wave band The B-52s. Gang 90 is considered to be the predecessor of all Brazilian new-wave bands of the 80s.

In 1982 she collaborated with the independent TVDO videoart group and in partnership with the producer Nelson Motta co-produced the TV program Mocidade Independente for TV Bandeirantes.

In 1984 she released her first single, "Fire in the jungle/Índio", in Brazil, The Netherlands and Japan with EMI. Fire in the Jungle became a soundtrack for the film Areias Escaldantes directed by Francisco de Paula.

Some months later, her first album, Remota Batucada was launched. The music was an original brand of electronica, folk music, and new wave pop and was coined as "tribal ie-ie". East also released the albums Tabapora and Charites. She moved to England and then to the Scottish community of Findhorn, where she focused on ecological activism and began giving lectures and seminars. In the late 90s she released the albums: Cave of the Heart (with the Findhorn Community Chorus) and Cosmic Breath (with her ex-husband Craig Gibsone); and 1001 Faces (solo album) in 2002.

== Career ==
East has played a role in developing relationships between the United Nations and the Findhorn Ecovillage, culminating in the establishment of CIFAL Scotland in 2006. The United Nations Institute for Training and Research affiliated training centre for Northern Europe operated for 10 years as a hub for capacity building, leadership and knowledge sharing between local and regional authorities, international organisations, the private sector and civil society under East's leadership.

She is the co-founder and Chief Executive of Gaia Education, an international consortium of sustainability designers and educators from research and development centers for carbon-constrained lifestyles.

East was included in the 100 Global Sustain Ability Leaders list for three years in a row (2011, 2012 and 2013). The list was created by Ken Hickson, Chairman/CEO of Sustain Ability Showcase Asia and ABC Carbon, and recognises 100 people worldwide who have provided leadership in the field of sustainability.

In 2019, East received the Women of the Decade in Sustainability & Leadership Award presented by the Women Economic Forum and All Ladies League.

A UNITAR Fellow, she has an MSc in Spatial Planning with specialisation in integrated approaches for the regeneration of abandoned towns in southern Italy, which makes the case for the reactivation of abandoned settlements, the so-called ghost towns in southern Europe, as an alternative housing solution that comes with embedded collective memory and offers 'locally adaptable, culturally rooted' opportunities for communities. She has contributed a chapter of her findings to the book From Conflict to Inclusion in Housing: Interaction of Communities, Residents and Activists.

East is one of the co-founders of the Global Ecovillage Network and has lived for 15 years in the Findhorn Ecovillage, where she established a new strand of Education for Sustainable Development.

She holds a PhD in Architecture and Urban Planning with the University of Dundee on the topic What if Women Designed the City?

Since 2013, East has contributed articles to publications including The Scotsman, The Guardian, The Nature of Cities, The Conversation, the Scientific Journal of the European Ecocycles Society, and Sustainability published by MDPI. She is the author of What if Women Designed the City? 33 leverage points for your city to work better form women and girls published by Triarchy Press in 2024, published in Portuguese by Bambual Editora in 2025, and in Spanish by Ecohabitar Editorial in 2025.
