= Paulo Ricardo (musician) =

Brazilian rock musician

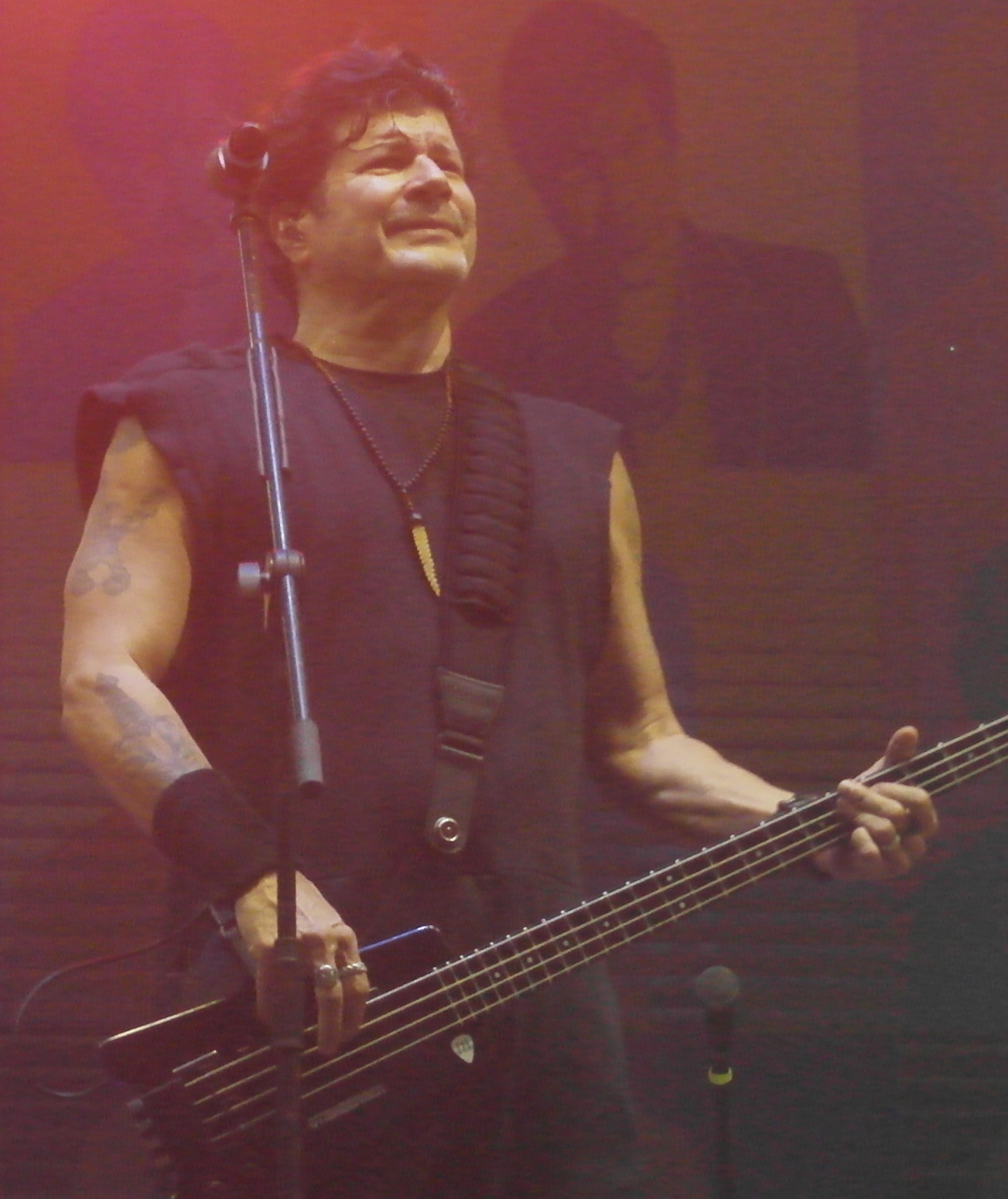
- Ricardo performing in 2024

Background information
- Born: Paulo Ricardo Oliveira Nery de Medeiros; September 23, 1962 (age 63); Rio de Janeiro, Brazil
- Genres: Rock; hard rock; pop rock; power pop; MPB; adult contemporary; soft rock; bossa nova; new wave; pop; pop rock; progressive rock
- Occupations: Singer; musician; songwriter
- Instruments: Vocals; bass; guitar
- Years active: 1984–present
- Formerly of: RPM
- Website: pauloricardo.com

Paulo Ricardo Oliveira Nery de Medeiros (born September 23, 1962) is a Brazilian rock singer, musician and songwriter. He was a longtime member of the band RPM as a bass guitarist and vocalist. He has also released several solo albums.

== Early life ==
In his childhood, Ricardo listened to Nat King Cole and the collections of the famous Big Bands from Toquinho, Vinícius de Morais and Maria Creuza. He joined the band Prisma in the late 1970s and also founded the band Aura in the early 1980s. He rode with a keyboard player Luiz Schiavon, formed Aura, without expressive results.

== Career ==
In early 1983, Ricardo co-formed the rock band RPM. Their debut album Revoluções por Minuto was released in 1985. It sold more than 600 thousand copies. The album came with a sound tuned with the best of pop rock of the time (Duran Duran, A-HA, Alphaville) and lyrics with direct influence of progressive rock.

In 1986, they released the live album Rádio Pirata ao Vivo, which was directed by Ney Matogrosso, and which sold more than 3.7 million copies across the country.

In 1988, they released the album RPM (known as Os quatro Coiotes ), which was a sales failure selling only 200,000 copies. The atmosphere between the components was not good and with many frictions, mainly from egos, the band broke up the following year.

In 2001, Ricardo returned to work with RPM partners and released the single "Vida Real". At the end of the same year, work began with MTV Brasil to launch a RPM special with CD and DVD. The album "MTV RPM 2002", sold more than 300,000 copies of the CD and 50,000 copies of the DVD taking RPM back into the spotlight.

In 2003, after disagreements between the members, the RPM is again undone.

In early 2011, Ricardo and Schiavon were already composing new songs and rehearsing with Fernando Deluqui and Paulo P.A. Pagni. Where they released the album with new songs "Elektra" was on November 18, 2011.

=== Solo career ===
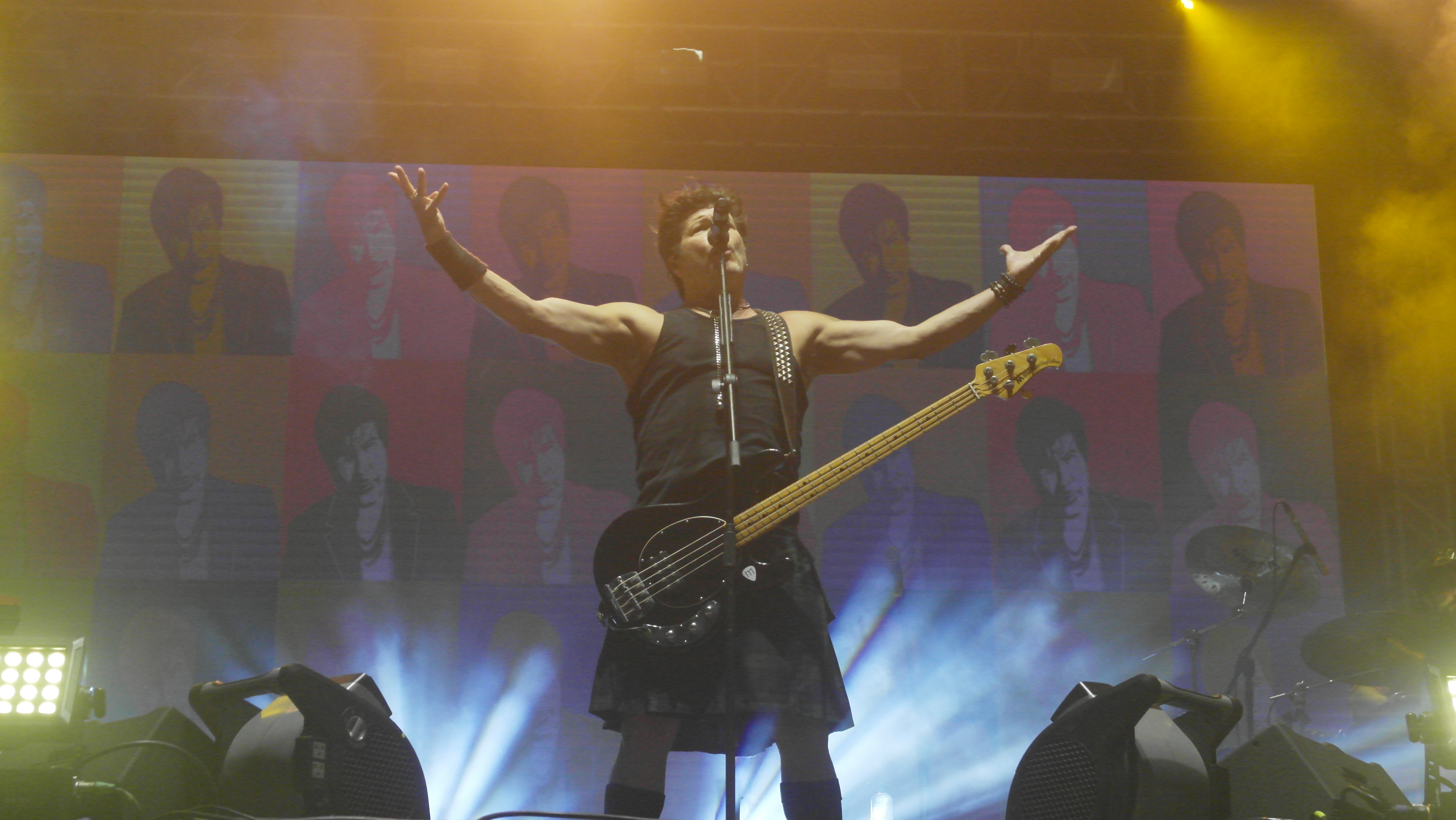
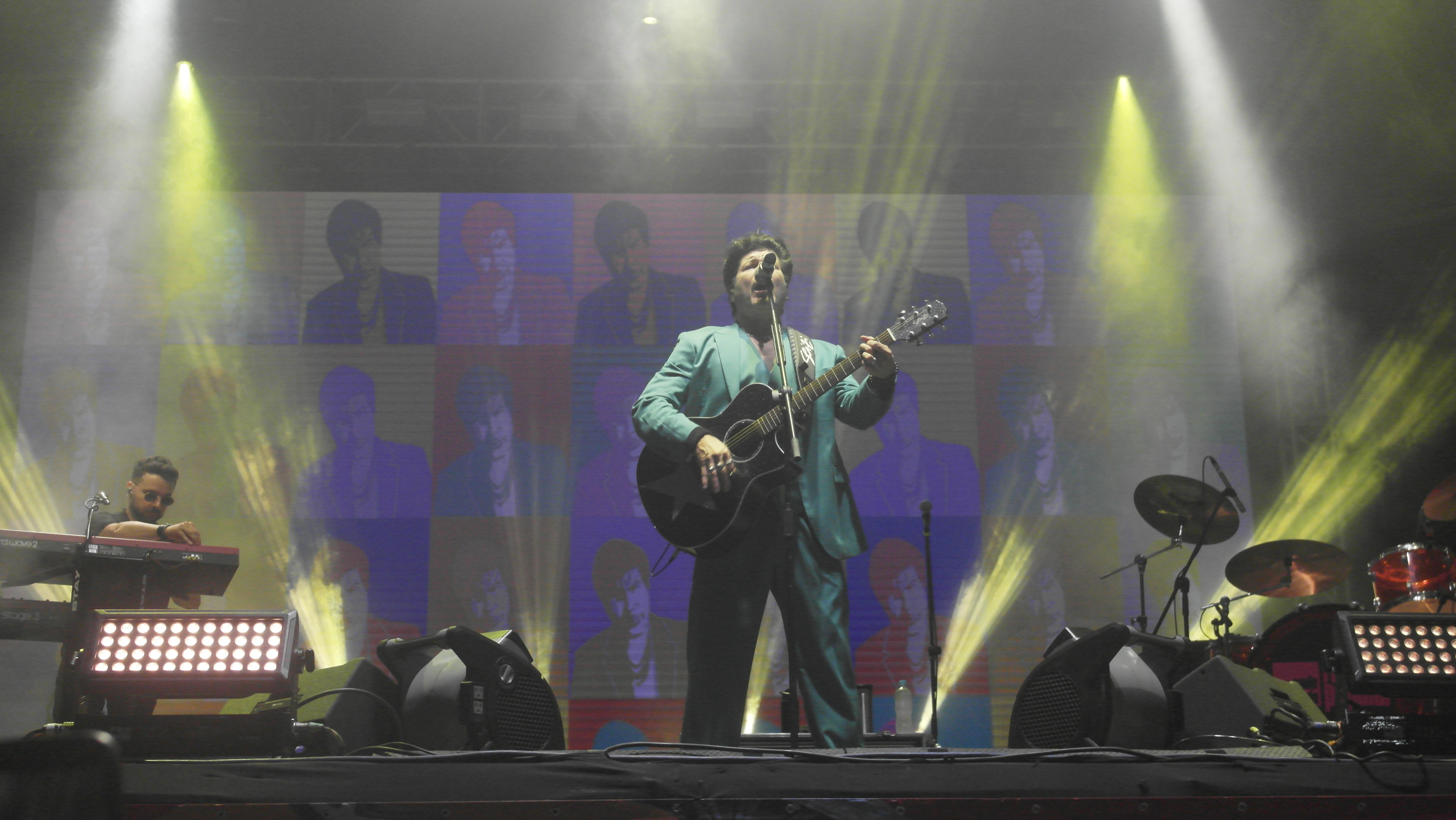
Ricardo performing in 2024

Ricardo's solo career began shortly after the break with the band RPM. Released in 1989 entitled "Paulo Ricardo", it featured the hits "A Step of Eternity" and "A Fina Poeira do Ar". In 1991, their second album, "Psico Trópico", was released.

In 1996, he launched the work "Rock Popular Brasileiro", where he made a reinterpretation of several classics of rock and national pop. Amor Amor Chosen Me "from 1997, shows a more romantic Paulo Ricardo and the album presented the hit" Dois " In 2004 the work "Zum Zum" was launched. In 2005, with the band PR.5, he released the CD and DVD Acoustic Live, in which he interprets international successes of bands and singers.

== Personal life ==
Paulo Ricardo is the son of engineer Waldeck Nery de Medeiros and teacher Sônia Oliveira, studied Journalism at USP and worked as a journalist for four years, has two sisters named Cristiane and Rosane, has four children: Paola, Isabela, Luís Eduardo and Diana. Luciana Vendramini was married for eight years from 1989 to 1996. It was eight years full of jealousy on both sides. At the time, he was 27, and she was 17. Paulo Ricardo married Gabriela Verdeja in 2005 the couple stayed together for 12 years and separated in 2017. Gabriela is the mother of Isabela, Luís Eduardo and Diana.

== Discography ==
- Paulo Ricardo – 1989
- Psico Trópico – 1991
- Rock Popular Brasileiro – 1996
- O Amor Me Escolheu – 1997
- La Cruz Y La Espada – 1998
- Amor de Verdade – 1999
- Paulo Ricardo – 2000
- Acoustic Live – 2005
- Prisma – 2006
- Novo Álbum – 2016

=== RPM ===
- 1985: Revoluções por Minuto
- 1986: Rádio Pirata Ao Vivo
- 1987: RPM & Milton
- 1988: RPM – Quatro Coiotes
- 1993: Paulo Ricardo & RPM
- 2002: MTV RPM 2002
- 2011: Elektra
- 2023: Sem Parar
