= RPM (band) =

Brazilian pop rock band

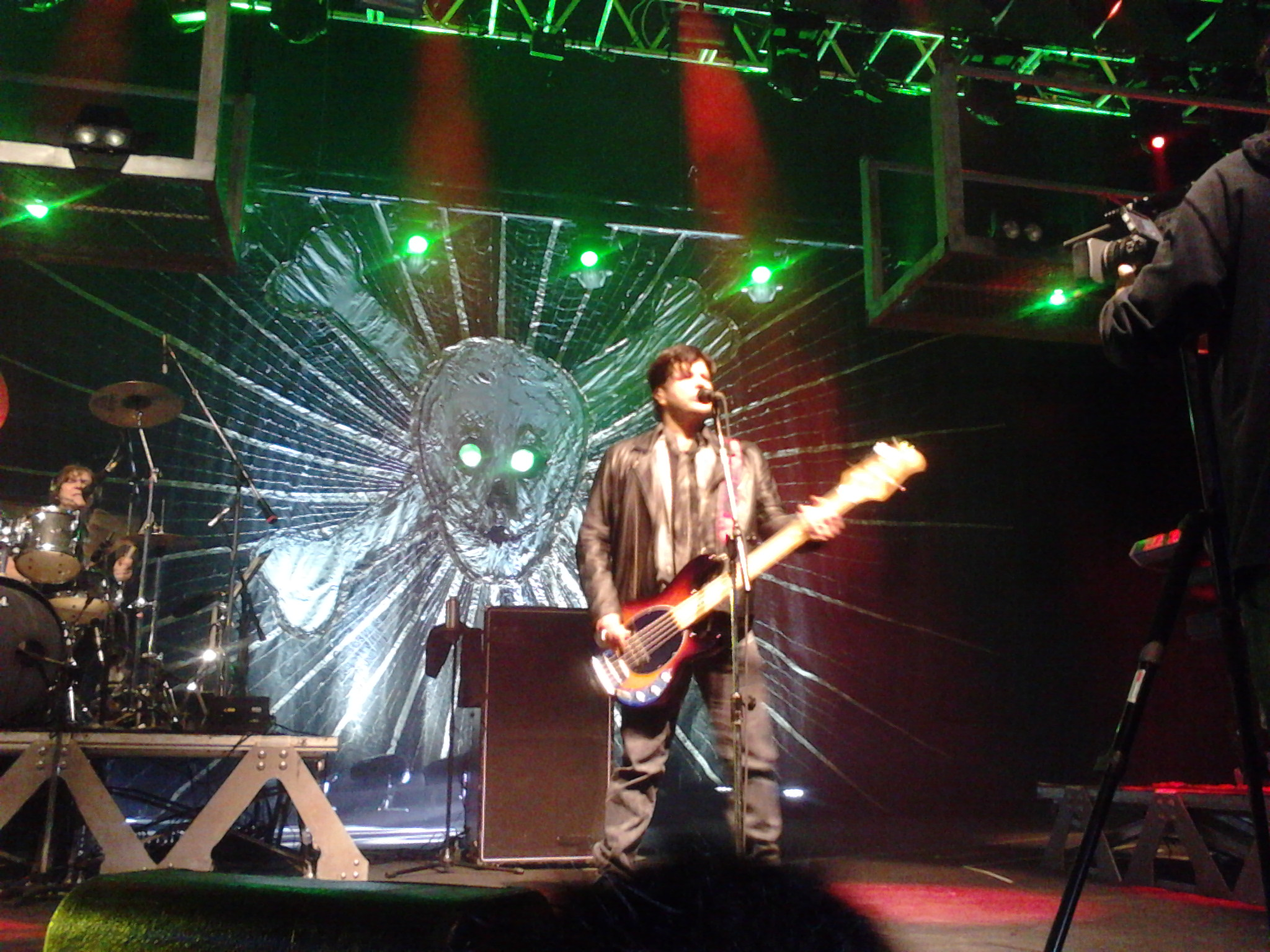
- Band RPM 2011

Background information
- Origin: São Paulo, Brazil
- Genres: Pop rock, synth-pop, new wave, post-punk, alternative rock, new romantic
- Years active: 1983–1989, 1993–1994, 2001–2004, 2011–2024
- Labels: Epic, Philips, Polygram, Universal, Building
- Past members: Fernando Deluqui; Paulo Ricardo; Luiz Schiavon; Paulo Pagni; Moreno Júnior; Charles Gavin; Marquinho Costa; Franco Júnior; Dioy Pallone; Kiko Zara

RPM ("Revoluções por Minuto", "Revolutions per Minute", in Brazilian Portuguese) was a Brazilian pop rock band. It was formed in 1983 by Paulo Ricardo (vocal/bass), Luiz Schiavon (keyboards), Fernando Deluqui (guitar) and Paulo Pagni (drums).

== History ==
RPM played soft techno-pop with strong, paradoxical influences from progressive rock and European synthpop. Their lyrics were pessimistic and ironic, and full of literary allusions to the likes of Arthur Rimbaud, Surrealism and Christiane F., and political references.

The band was very successful in the mid-1980s, being considered The Beatles of Brazil. Their live album Rádio Pirata ao vivo was the best-selling Brazilian record ever, with more than 3 million copies sold. The group's success was not limited to CD sales. RPM started a phenomenon that was compared to Beatlemania, with enthusiastic fans filling stadiums, stopping traffic, evading security, and buying any products with the RPM brand.

After two years the band took a break, but returned in 1988 with the album 4 Coiotes. It had a mix of progressive, jazz and dark sounds, and sold more than 300,000 copies – a good number, but far from what was expected. Problems involving individual egos and drugs started to increase, and at the end of the tour the band could not agree about the sound of the next album. The tension between members killed the band in 1988.

Paulo Ricardo, however, tried to revive the band a few times in the following years. In the early 1990s, he and Deluqui put together a new band under the name "Paulo Ricardo & RPM", this time trying a harder rock style to fit the trend of the time. With no significant commercial success, the project failed.

However, in 2002 the original lineup reunited for a very successful tour and live album, MTV RPM 2002. The album was a reinterpretation of the successful songs of the 1980s, plus five new tracks, including a Brazilian version of the reality show "Big Brother Brazil", which was considered by the Big Brother world director as the best theme of all the countries involved in the franchise. Shortly after, the band split once again because of personal differences.

In 2011, Paulo Ricardo posted on Twitter that RPM would return. The band recorded a new album called Elektra, on two CDs. One CD contained remixes – RPM was the first band in Brazil to record a remix of the 80's smash hit "Louras Geladas". The record was released in December 2011 with a paradoxical song like an electronic rock album, where the synthesizer has a fundamental place. The lyrics were more mature than those of 1980's, with themes like the Elektra complex, night life and seduction and media influence, but there was also a romantic ballad. The album was well received.

The group's "Elektra" tour during 2012 encompassed Brazil and some cities in Argentina. In 2013 the band planned to record a DVD of the tour, including tracks from the Elektra album, successful songs from its entire career, and a reinterpretation of Pink Floyd's "Wish You Were Here".

On 22 June 2019, the band's drummer, Paulo Pagni, died at the age of 61 from pulmonary fibrosis. On 15 June 2023, keyboardist Luiz Schiavon, died at the age of 64.

In June 2024, following a legal dispute between Paulo Ricardo and Fernando Deluqui over the RPM name, the band announced their disbandment but continued to perform until August 2024, when Deluqui began performing under the name "RPM - O Legado", subsequently disbanding RPM.

== Band members ==
=== Principal members ===
- Fernando Deluqui – lead and rhythm guitars, vocals (1983–1989, 1993–1994, 2001–2004, 2011–2024)
- Luiz Schiavon – keyboards, piano, organ, synthesizers, vocals (1983–1989; 2001–2004; 2011–2023; his death)
- Paulo Pagni – drums, percussion (1985–1989; 2002–2004; 2011–2019; his death)
- Paulo Ricardo – bass guitar, lead vocals (1983–1989; 2001–2004; 2011–2018)

=== Other members ===
- Moreno Júnior – drums, percussion (1983–1984)
- Charles Gavin – drums, percussion (1984–1985)
- Marquinho Costa – drums, percussion (1993–1994)
- Franco Júnior – keyboards (1993–1994)
- Dioy Pallone – bass, vocals (2018–2024)
- Kiko Zara – drums, percussion, vocals, (2022–2024 touring and session musician 2019–2022; substitute 2019)

=== Touring members ===
- Luis "Gus" Martins – keyboards, backing vocals (2023–2024; substitute 2022–2023)
- Tato Andreatta – keyboards (2023–2024; substitute musician 2022–2023)
- Jo Borges – keyboards, backing vocals (2022)

== Discography ==
- (1985) Revoluções por Minuto
- (1986) Rádio Pirata ao Vivo
- (1988) Quatro Coiotes
- (1993) Paulo Ricardo & RPM
- (2002) MTV RPM 2002 (also released on DVD)
- (2011) Elektra
- (2023) Sem Parar
