= 1955 in animation =

Events in 1955 in animation.

== Events ==
=== January ===
- January 14: Jack Hannah's Donald Duck cartoon No Hunting premieres, produced by Walt Disney Animation Studios. Bambi and his mother make a cameo in this short.
- January 15: Robert McKimson's Foghorn Leghorn cartoon Feather Dusted premieres, produced by Warner Bros. Cartoons. Also starring Egghead Jr. & Miss Prissy.
- January 29: The pilot episode of Art Clokey's Gumby airs. It will become a full series a year later.

=== February ===
- February 12: Chuck Jones' Beanstalk Bunny premieres, starring Bugs Bunny, Daffy Duck and Elmer Fudd, produced by Warner Bros. Cartoons.
- February 19: Robert McKimson's Foghorn Leghorn cartoon All Fowled Up premieres, produced by Warner Bros. Cartoons. Also starring Barnyard Dawg & Henery Hawk.
- February 26: Friz Freleng's Daffy Duck cartoon Stork Naked premieres, produced by Warner Bros. Cartoons. Also starring The Drunk Stork.

=== March ===
- March 12:
  - Robert McKimson's Sylvester and Hippety Hopper cartoon Lighthouse Mouse premieres, produced by Warner Bros. Cartoons.
  - Hanna-Barbera's Tom and Jerry short Southbound Duckling premieres, produced by MGM's Cartoon Studio.
- March 26: Friz Freleng's Bugs Bunny and Yosemite Sam cartoon Sahara Hare premieres, produced by Warner Bros. Cartoons. Daffy Duck makes a cameo appearance at the end of the short.
- March 30: 27th Academy Awards: The Mr. Magoo short film When Magoo Flew, produced by UPA and directed by Pete Burness, wins the Academy Award for Best Animated Short.

=== April ===
- April 2: Friz Freleng's Tweety and Sylvester cartoon Sandy Claws premieres, produced by Warner Bros. Cartoons. Also starring Granny. This was Bea Benaderet's final performance as Granny, June Foray would soon take over as the elderly woman.
- April 11: Tex Avery's The Legend of Rockabye Point premieres, produced by Walter Lantz.
- April 16: Robert McKimson's The Hole Idea is first released, produced by Warner Bros. Cartoons, an animated short he directed and animated almost entirely on his own.
- April 26 - May 10: 1955 Cannes Film Festival: Jiří Trnka's The Good Soldier Schweik premieres.
- April 30:
  - Hanna-Barbera's Tom and Jerry short Pup on a Picnic premieres, produced by MGM's Cartoon Studio.
  - Tex Avery's Field and Scream premieres, produced by MGM's Cartoon Studio.
  - Chuck Jones' Wile E. Coyote and Road Runner cartoon Ready, Set, Zoom! premieres, produced by Warner Bros. Cartoons.

=== May ===
- May 7: Friz Freleng's Bugs Bunny and Elmer Fudd cartoon Hare Brush premieres, produced by Warner Bros. Cartoons. This short features Bugs & Elmer having reversed roles.
- May 21:
  - Hanna-Barbera's Tom and Jerry short Mouse for Sale premieres, produced by MGM's Cartoon Studio.
  - Chuck Jones' Pepé Le Pew cartoon Past Perfumance premieres, produced by Warner Bros. Cartoons. Also starring Penelope Pussycat.

=== June ===
- June 4: Friz Freleng's Tweety and Sylvester cartoon Tweety's Circus premieres, produced by Warner Bros. Cartoons.
- June 6: Tex Avery's animated short Sh-h-h-h-h-h is first released, produced by Walter Lantz Productions. It is the final theatrical animated short made by him before his retirement.
- June 11: Chuck Jones' Rabbit Rampage premieres starring Bugs Bunny, produced by Warner Bros. Cartoons. The short is a spiritual successor to Jones' Daffy Duck cartoon Duck Amuck. Elmer Fudd is revealed to be the animator at the end of the short.
- June 22: The Walt Disney Company releases Lady and the Tramp, directed by Clyde Geronimi, Wilfred Jackson and Hamilton Luske, It was the first animated film to be filmed in the CinemaScope widescreen film process.

=== July ===
- July 9: Friz Freleng's This Is a Life? premieres, produced by Warner Bros. Cartoons. Starring Bugs Bunny, Elmer Fudd, Yosemite Sam, Daffy Duck, & Granny (voiced by June Foray for the very first time). The short features footage from Freleng's previous Bugs Bunny cartoons such as A Hare Grows in Manhattan, Hare Do, and Buccaneer Bunny.
- July 17: Disneyland opens in Anaheim, California.

=== August ===
- August 5: Karel Zeman's Journey to the Beginning of Time premieres.
- August 6: Chuck Jones' Porky Pig and Sylvester cartoon Jumpin' Jupiter premieres, produced by Warner Bros. Cartoons. This is the final pairing of Porky and Sylvester in the Golden Age of Animation.
- August 19: Jack Hannah's Donald Duck cartoon Bearly Asleep premieres, produced by Walt Disney Animation Studios. Also starring Humphrey the Bear.
- August 20: Friz Freleng's cartoon A Kiddies Kitty premieres, produced by Warner Bros. Cartoons. Starring Sylvester and Hector the Bulldog.
- August 27: Friz Freleng's cartoon Hyde and Hare premieres starring Bugs Bunny, produced by Warner Bros. Cartoons.

=== September ===
- September 2:
  - Jack Hannah's Donald Duck cartoon Beezy Bear premieres, produced by Walt Disney Animation Studios. Also starring Humphrey the Bear.
  - Hanna-Barbera's Tom and Jerry short Designs on Jerry premieres, produced by MGM's Cartoon Studio.
- September 3: Robert McKimson's Porky Pig and Daffy Duck cartoon Dime to Retire premieres, produced by Warner Bros. Cartoons. This is the final short to feature Porky as an annoyed victim, following cartoons would star him as the more successful sidekick to Daffy's highly egoistical character.
- September 9: Hanna-Barbera's Tom and Jerry short Tom and Chérie, produced by MGM's Cartoon Studio.
- September 16: Vladimir Polkovnikov and Aleksandra Snezhko-Blotskaya's The Enchanted Boy premieres, an animated feature based on Nils Holgersson by Selma Lagerlöf.
- September 17: Speedy Gonzales, who was earlier created by Robert McKimson, appears in a remodeled version in the Friz Freleng cartoon Speedy Gonzales, produced by Warner Bros. Cartoons. It launches the character as the star of a long-running series. Sylvester also appears in the short as the main antagonist.
- September 23: Jack Hannah's Donald Duck cartoon Up a Tree premieres, produced by Walt Disney Animation Studios. Also starring Chip 'n' Dale.
- September 30: Tex Avery's The First Bad Man premieres, produced by MGM's Cartoon Studio.

=== October ===
- October 1: Chuck Jones' Knight-mare Hare premieres starring Bugs Bunny, produced by Warner Bros. Cartoons.
- October 3: The first episode of The Mickey Mouse Club airs on television.
- October 14: Hanna-Barbera's Tom and Jerry short Smarty Cat, produced by MGM's Cartoon Studio, premieres.
- October 15: Chuck Jones' Pepé Le Pew cartoon Two Scent's Worth premieres, produced by Warner Bros. Cartoons. Also starring Penelope Pussycat.
- October 28: MGM releases Deputy Droopy, a cartoon starring Droopy, directed by Tex Avery. Avery left the Metro-Goldwyn-Mayer cartoon studio in 1953, but the cartoon was only finished and released after he left.
- October 29: Friz Freleng's Tweety and Sylvester cartoon Red Riding Hoodwinked premieres, produced by Warner Bros. Cartoons. Also starring Granny.

=== November ===
- November 11: The Tom and Jerry short film Pecos Pest, produced by MGM's Cartoon Studio, premieres. This was the last Tom and Jerry Cartoon to be produced in the Academy format ratio, all following shorts would be produced in the CinemaScope format.
- November 12: Friz Freleng's Bugs Bunny and Yosemite Sam short film Roman Legion-Hare, produced by Warner Bros. Cartoons, is first released.
- November 19: Hanna-Barbera's Tom and Jerry short That's My Mommy, produced by MGM's Cartoon Studio, premieres.
- November 25: MGM releases Cellbound, a cartoon starring Spike the bulldog, directed by Tex Avery. Avery left MGM in 1953, but the cartoon was only finished and released after he left.
- November 26: Friz Freleng's Sylvester and Elmer Fudd cartoon Heir-Conditioned premieres, produced by Warner Bros. Cartoons. Tweety makes a cameo at the beginning of the short.

=== December ===
- December 10:
  - Chuck Jones' Wile E. Coyote and Road Runner short Guided Muscle, produced by Warner Bros. Cartoons, premieres.
  - The first episode of Mighty Mouse Playhouse airs.
- December 15: The first episode of A Rubovian Legend airs.
- December 17: Friz Freleng's Sylvester cartoon Pappy's Puppy premieres, produced by Warner Bros. Cartoons. Also starring The Drunk Stork.
- December 31: Chuck Jones' One Froggy Evening, premieres, produced by Warner Bros. Cartoons. It marks the debut of Michigan J. Frog.

=== Specific date unknown ===
- Belvision Studios creates several animated television shorts for Belgian television, based on Suske en Wiske and Till Eulenspiegel by Willy Vandersteen, which are broadcast during the children's show Kom Toch Eens Kijken.
- Alberta Siegel conducts a study on the effect of cartoon violence on young children, under the title: Film-Mediated Fantasy Aggression and Strength of Aggressive Drive. She shows the Ub Iwerks cartoon The Little Red Hen and Woody Woodpecker cartoon Ace in the Hole as test subjects and notices the children play more aggressively after watching the Woody Woodpecker cartoon. A year later the test will cause debate and concern among moral guardians.

== Films released ==
- June 22 - Lady and the Tramp (United States)
- September 16 - The Enchanted Boy (Soviet Union)
- December 23 - The Enchanted Village (Canada)
- Specific date unknown - The Devil and Kate (Czechoslovakia)

== Television series ==
- October 3:
  - Captain Kangaroo debuts on CBS.
  - The Mickey Mouse Club debuts on ABC, on Disney Channel, and in syndication.
- December 10 - Mighty Mouse Playhouse debuts on CBS.
- December 15 - A Rubovian Legend debuts on BBC.

== Births ==
=== January ===
- January 2: Tex Brashear, American actor (voice of Tony the Tiger from Frosted Flakes, Sonny the Cuckoo Bird from Cocoa Puffs, Lucky the Leprechaun from Lucky Charms, Charlie the Tuna from StarKist).
- January 3: Hal Rayle, American voice actor (voice of Deep Six in G.I. Joe: A Real American Hero, Pipes, Snarl, and Shrapnel in The Transformers, Raphael in the European side season of Teenage Mutant Ninja Turtles, Inspector Clouseau in The Pink Panther, Lieutenant Commander Steele in Swat Kats: The Radical Squadron, Doyle Cleverlobe in Galaxy High, Bonehead and Dr. Bender in Toxic Crusaders).
- January 6: Rowan Atkinson, English actor, comedian and writer (voice of Zazu in The Lion King, Mr. Bean in Mr. Bean: The Animated Series).
- January 9: J. K. Simmons, American actor (voice of J. Jonah Jameson in The Avengers: Earth's Mightiest Heroes episode "Along Came a Spider...", Ultimate Spider-Man, Avengers Assemble, Hulk and the Agents of S.M.A.S.H., Spider-Man: Across the Spider-Verse, and The Simpsons episode "Moe'N'a Lisa", White Knight in Generator Rex, Ford Pines in Gravity Falls, Yellow M&M from M&M, General Wade Eiling in Justice League Unlimited, Martin Smarty in Kim Possible, J.B. & Napoleon in Phineas and Ferb, Tenzin in The Legend of Korra, Omni-Man in Invincible, Kai in Kung Fu Panda 3, Mayor Lionheart in Zootopia, the title character in Klaus, Captain Putty in Chip 'n Dale Rescue Rangers, Conductor Maestro Mackerel in the SpongeBob SquarePants episode "Snooze You Lose").
- January 12: Tom Ardolino, American rock drummer and member of NRBQ (voiced himself in The Simpsons episodes "The Old Man and the "C" Student", "Take My Wife, Sleaze" and "Insane Clown Poppy"), (d. 2012).
- January 14: Nancy Linari, American actress (voice of Aunt May in Spider-Man, Julia in The Real Adventures of Jonny Quest, Morticia Addams in The Addams Family, Martha Barriga in the Steven Universe episode "The New Lars").
- January 15:
  - Mayumi Tanaka, Japanese actress (voice of Gariben in the Doraemon franchise, Krillin in the Dragon Ball franchise, Monkey D. Luffy in One Piece, Ryunosuke Fujinami in Urusei Yatsura).
  - Miyuki Hoshikawa, Japanese animator (Noozles, Disney Television Animation, CatDog) and storyboard artist (Nickelodeon Animation Studio, Cartoon Network Studios, Warner Bros. Animation, The Cleveland Show, Special Agent Oso, Big Hero 6: The Series).
- January 16: Steven Weisberg, American film editor (Sir Billi), (d. 2023).
- January 21: Karsten Kiilerich, Danish film and television director, screenwriter and animator (When Life Departs, Help! I'm a Fish, The Ugly Duckling and Me!, Albert, The Little Vampire 3D, Up and Away, Raggie).
- January 22: John Wesley Shipp, American actor (voice of Eobard Thawne / Professor Zoom in the Batman: The Brave and the Bold episode "Requiem for a Scarlet Speedster!").
- January 27: Kerrigan Mahan, American actor (voice of Bunta Fujiwara in Initial D, Yamcha in Dragon Ball, Edwin Alva in Static Shock).

=== February ===
- February 1: David Wise, American television scriptwriter (Star Trek: The Animated Series, The Transformers, Teenage Mutant Ninja Turtles, Chip 'n Dale: Rescue Rangers, Batman: The Animated Series), (d. 2020).
- February 7: Miguel Ferrer, American actor (voice of Shan Yu in Mulan, Death in Adventure Time, Tarakudo in Jackie Chan Adventures, Vandal Savage in Young Justice, Deathstroke in Teen Titans: The Judas Contract, Martian Manhunter in Justice League: The New Frontier, Aquaman and Weather Wizard in Superman: The Animated Series, Agent Hopkins in the American Dad! episode "American Dream Factory", Magister Hulka in the Ben 10: Ultimate Alien episode "Basic Training"), (d. 2017).
- February 8: Jerry Beck, American animation historian, author, blogger and video producer (The 50 Greatest Cartoons).
- February 9:
  - Jim J. Bullock, American actor and comedian (voice of the Magistrate in The Scarecrow, the title character in Queer Duck, Bouty in the Animated Hero Classics episode "Marie Curie", Jacques-Jean and Emerald Joe in the Rick & Steve: The Happiest Gay Couple in All the World episode "Wickeder").
  - Charles Shaughnessy, English actor (voice of Dennis in Stanley, Mr. Pants in The Marvelous Misadventures of Flapjack episode "Fancy Pants", Ned Fussbuster in the Scooby-Doo! Mystery Incorporated episode "The Hodag of Horror").
- February 15: Christopher McDonald, American actor (voice of Kent Mansley in The Iron Giant, Jor-El in Superman: The Animated Series and Justice League Unlimited, Hego in Kim Possible, Captain Nemesis in Ben 10: Ultimate Alien and Ben 10: Omniverse, Harvey Dent in Beware the Batman, Superman in the Batman Beyond episode "The Call").
- February 16: Peter Siragusa, American actor (voice of Bruton in Dinosaur, Rufus in Cloudy with a Chance of Meatballs, additional voices in Cloudy with a Chance of Meatballs 2, Home on the Range, and Mickey's Twice Upon a Christmas), (d. 2022).
- February 19: Jeff Daniels, American actor (voice of Zartog in Space Chimps, himself in the Family Guy episode "A Fistful of Meg").
- February 21: Kelsey Grammer, American actor (voice of Sideshow Bob in The Simpsons, Dr. Frankenollie in Runaway Brain, Vladimir in Anastasia, Stinky Pete in Toy Story 2, the title character in Gary the Rat, Blinky Galadrigal in Trollhunters: Tales of Arcadia, Hunter in Storks).
- February 23: Tom Bodett, American writer and radio host (voice of the "Mime Time" and "Good Idea/Bad Idea" Narrator in Animaniacs).
- February 24: Steve Jobs, American business magnate (co-founder of Pixar), (d. 2011).
- February 27: Lou Hirsch, American actor (voice of Baby Herman in Who Framed Roger Rabbit, Chuck Gopher and Nacho in Gophers!, additional voices in We're Back! A Dinosaur's Story).
- February 28: Gilbert Gottfried, American actor and comedian (voice of Iago in the Aladdin franchise and House of Mouse, Digit and Widget in Cyberchase, Mr. Peabody in Problem Child, Mister Mxyzptlk in Superman: The Animated Series and Justice League Action, Berkeley Beetle in Thumbelina, Art DeSalvo in Duckman, Kraang Subprime in Teenage Mutant Ninja Turtles, Mario Zucchini in Animal Crackers, Clion in the Hercules episode "Hercules and the Assassin", Santa Claus in The Grim Adventures of Billy & Mandy episode "Billy and Mandy Save Christmas", Rick Platypus in the My Gym Partner's a Monkey episode "That Darn Platypus", Mr. Greenway in Elf: Buddy's Musical Christmas, Genie in The Tom and Jerry Show episode "Meanie Genie", Sal in the SpongeBob SquarePants episode "The Hankering", Coal Miner in the Teen Titans Go! episode "Christmas Crusaders", God in the Smiling Friends episode "Charlie Dies and Doesn't Come Back", himself in Dr. Katz, Professional Therapist, Celebrity Deathmatch, and The Replacements episode "A Buzzwork Orange"), (d. 2022).

=== March ===
- March 5: Penn Jillette, American magician, actor, musician, inventor, television presenter and author (guest starred in the Fetch! with Ruff Ruffman episode "You Can't Teach an Orange Dog New Tricks", voice of Flea in The Moxy Show, TV Announcer in Toy Story, Pluto Devil in Mickey Mouse Works and House of Mouse, Fortune Teller, Pawn Shop Owner and Ticket Man in ¡Mucha Lucha!: The Return of El Maléfico, The Great Who Who Dini in T.O.T.S., Frank Grimes in the Nightmare Ned episode "Lucky Abe", Magic Marty in the Handy Manny episode "Squeeze's Magic Show", Magical Johnson in The Cleveland Show episode "Brown Magic", himself in The Simpsons episodes "Hello Gutter, Hello Fadder" and "The Great Simpsina", the Futurama episode "Into The Wild Green Yonder", and the Scooby-Doo and Guess Who? episode "The Cursed Cabinet of Professor Madds Markson!").
- March 6: Larry Cedar, American actor (voice of Mr. Pibbles in Samurai Jack, Oblongata, Hans, Anton Mohans, and Chip Clavicle in Freakazoid!, Howell Wainwright in the Ben 10 episode "A Small Problem").
- March 12: Celia Kendrick, American animator (The Simpsons), storyboard artist (The Simpsons, Warner Bros. Animation, Disney Television Animation, Duckman, I Am Weasel, Nickelodeon Animation Studio, Rugrats, The Proud Family, Beavis and Butt-Head, Napoleon Dynamite, Curious George, Curious George 3: Back to the Jungle, Puppy Dog Pals, The VeggieTales Show), writer (New Looney Tunes) and director (Rugrats).
- March 15: Dee Snider, American musician and actor (voice of the Duke of Detroit in Motorcity, Tooth Fairy in the Secret Mountain Fort Awesome episode "Funstro", Angry Jack in the SpongeBob SquarePants episode "Shell Shocked").
- March 19: Bruce Willis, German-born American retired actor (voice of the title character in Bruno the Kid, Muddy Grimes in Beavis and Butt-Head Do America, Spike in Rugrats Go Wild, RJ in Over the Hedge, himself in The Lego Movie 2: The Second Part).
- March 28: Reba McEntire, American country singer (voice of Dixie in The Fox and the Hound 2, Etta in The Land Before Time XIV: Journey of the Brave, Joy Jenkins in Spies in Disguise, Artemis in Hercules).
- March 29:
  - Marina Sirtis, English actress (voice of Demona in Gargoyles, Queen Bee in Young Justice, Deanna Troi in Star Trek: Lower Decks and Family Guy, Cosma in OK K.O.! Let's Be Heroes, Aurora Abromowitz in the Duckman episode "Where No Duckman Has Gone Before", Samantha the Warrior Dog in the Adventure Time episode "The Pit", herself in the Family Guy episode "Not All Dogs Go to Heaven").
  - Brendan Gleeson, Irish actor (voice of Cellach in The Secret of Kells, Conor in Song of the Sea, Ferny in the Jakers! The Adventures of Piggley Winks episode "Wish Upon a Story").
- March 30:
  - Humberto Vélez, Mexican voice actor (dub voice of Homer Simpson in seasons 1-15 and 32-present of The Simpsons, Peter Griffin in seasons 1 and 2 of Family Guy, Professor Farnsworth and Kif Kroker in seasons 1-4 of Futurama, Lord Farquaad in Shrek, Roz in Monsters, Inc., John Silver in Treasure Planet, Hondo Ohnaka in Star Wars: The Clone Wars, continued voice of Winnie the Pooh).
  - Daniel Fanego, Argentine actor (voice of Martin Fierro in Fierro), (d. 2024).

=== April ===
- April 5: Akira Toriyama, Japanese manga artist and character designer (Dragon Ball, Dr. Slump), (d. 2024).
- April 6: Michael Rooker, American actor (voice of Red Doc in DC Showcase: Jonah Hex, Sheriff E.Z Ponder in the Archer episode "Bloody Ferlin", Merle Dixon in the Robot Chicken episode "The Robot Chicken Walking Dead Special: Look Who's Walking", Yondu in the What If...? episode "What If... T'Challa Became a Star-Lord?", Lutador in Vivo).
- April 15: Ryūtarō Nakamura, Japanese film director and animator (Serial Experiments Lain, Kino's Journey, Ghost Hound, Despera), (d. 2013).
- April 16: Moritz Borman, German-born American producer (The Little Prince, Playmobil: The Movie), (d. 2026).
- April 18: Keith Kaczorek, American television writer (Hey Arnold!, The Angry Beavers, The Backyardigans, Sid the Science Kid, Star vs. the Forces of Evil).
- April 29:
  - Kate Mulgrew, American actress (voice of Red Claw in Batman: The Animated Series, Cressa in The Pirates of Dark Water, Queen Hippsodeth in Aladdin, Anastasia Renard/Titania in Gargoyles, Dr. C. in Stretch Armstrong and the Flex Fighters, Samantha the cat in Infinity Train, Kathryn Janeway in Star Trek: Prodigy, Isis in the Mighty Max episode "The Mommy's Hand", June Rosewood in the American Dad! episode "A Star Is Reborn", General Zera in the Teenage Mutant Ninja Turtles episode "Half Shell Heroes: Blast to the Past").
  - Richard Epcar, American actor (voice of Batou in Ghost in the Shell, Daisuke Jigen in Lupin the Third, the title character in Bobobo-bo Bo-bobo, Zangetsu in Bleach).
  - Leslie Jordan, American actor (voice of Beauregard LaFontaine in American Dad!, additional voices in Roadside Romeo and Glenn Martin, DDS), (d. 2022).
- Specific date unknown: Terry Brain, British animator (The Trap Door, Wallace & Gromit), (d. 2016).

=== May ===
- May 1: Eric Goldberg, American animator, actor and film director (Walt Disney Animation Studios).
- May 8: Raoul Trujillo, American actor (voice of Geronimo in America: The Motion Picture, Namor in The Avengers: United They Stand episode "To Rule Atlantis").
- May 10:
  - Chris Berman, American sportscaster (voiced himself in the Clone High episode "Homecoming: A Shot in D'Arc" and the American Dad! episode "Fantasy Baseball").
  - Mbongeni Ngema, South African musician (The Lion King), (d. 2023).
- May 13: María Cecilia Botero, Colombian actress (voice of Alma Madrigal in Encanto).
- May 14: Dave Hoover, American comics artist and animator (Wanderers, Starman, Captain America), (d. 2011).
- May 17:
  - Pat Irwin, American composer and musician (Rocko's Modern Life, Pepper Ann, JetCat, Class of 3000, composed the theme song of My Gym Partner's a Monkey).
  - Bill Paxton, American actor and filmmaker (voice of Eddie Beck in Pixies), (d. 2017).
  - Marc Weiner, American actor (voice of Swiper, Map and the Fiesta Trio in Dora the Explorer).
- May 25: Mark Watters, American composer (Walt Disney Company, Warner Bros. Animation, Metro-Goldwyn-Mayer Animation).
- May 29: David Kirschner, American film and television producer and screenwriter (Hanna-Barbera, An American Tail, Curious George).
- May 30: Jake Roberts, American actor, podcaster and retired professional wrestler (voiced himself in Lucas Bros Moving Co and the Camp WWE episode "Survival Weekend", Doyle the Dart Player in Rapunzel's Tangled Adventure).
- May 31: Susie Essman, American comedian, actress, writer and producer (voice of Mittens in Bolt, Mrs. Lonstein in American Dad!, Sadie in the Kim Possible episode "Car Trouble", Queen Bee in the Dora the Explorer episode "Dora's First Trip", Barb in the Adventure Time episode "Web Weirdos", Sharon and Grandma Quinzel in the Harley Quinn episode "Bensonhurst", Lorraine in the Bob's Burgers episode "Sauce Side Story", herself in the Dr. Katz, Professional Therapist episode "Waltz").

=== June ===
- June 2: Dana Carvey, American actor and comedian (voice of Pops in The Secret Life of Pets franchise, Dana in Hotel Transylvania 2, Leonard in the Rick and Morty episode "Anatomy Park").
- June 3: Phil Nibbelink, American animator (Banjo the Woodpile Cat, Walt Disney Animation Studios, Casper, The Iron Giant), storyboard artist (Wolverine and the X-Men, Animal Crackers) and film director (An American Tail: Fievel Goes West, We're Back! A Dinosaur's Story, Puss in Boots, Romeo & Juliet: Sealed with a Kiss, Marmaduke).
- June 4: Mary Testa, American actress (voice of Shirley the Medium in Courage the Cowardly Dog, additional voices in Buster & Chauncey's Silent Night).
- June 6:
  - Sam Simon, American television director, producer, designer and writer (The Simpsons), (d. 2015).
  - Sandra Bernhard, American actress (voice of Cassandra in Hercules, Gsptlsnz in the Superman: The Animated Series episode "Mxyzpixilated", Sandra in the Dr. Katz, Professional Therapist episode "A Journey for the Betterment of People").
- June 9: Teddy Eccles, American actor (voice of Dorno in The Herculoids, the title character in The Little Drummer Boy).
- June 16:
  - Laurie Metcalf, American actress (voice of Mrs. Davis in the Toy Story franchise, Sarah Hawkins in Treasure Planet, Lucille Krunklehorn in Meet the Robinsons, Donna Allman in God, the Devil and Bob).
  - Tree Rollins, American former professional basketball player (voiced himself in The Simpsons episode "Treehouse of Horror XXXII").
- June 26:
  - Gedde Watanabe, American actor and comedian (voice of Ling in Mulan and Mulan II, Emperor and Nuri in Happily Ever After: Fairy Tales for Every Child, Kangaroo and Zack in Rugrats, Principal Nakamura and Dr. Suzuki in Batman Beyond, James in Whatever Happened to... Robot Jones?, Kenji in Scooby-Doo! and the Samurai Sword, Hamster Mitch and Tourist Alien in Bravest Warriors, Reo in the Puppy Dog Pals episode "Land of the Rising Pup", Ninja in the Duckman episode "The Mallardian Candidate", Factory Foreman in The Simpsons episode "In Marge We Trust", Mr. Min in The Proud Family episode "EZ Jackster", Vincent Wong in the What's New, Scooby-Doo? episode "Lights! Camera! Mayhem!", Long Duk Dong in the Family Guy episode "Mother Tucker").
  - Yvette Kaplan, American animator (HBO Storybook Musicals), storyboard artist (Doug), sheet timer (Codename: Kids Next Door, My Scene: Masquerade Madness, Sit Down, Shut Up, Curious George, Futurama, Stretch Armstrong and the Flex Fighters, DuckTales, Chicago Party Aunt, Harriet the Spy), consultant (The Magic School Bus, Cyberchase), voice director (Random! Cartoons), writer (Ice Age, Clarence), producer (Generation O!, Arthur's Missing Pal, Beavis and Butt-Head, Clarence, Sonic Boom) and director (Doug, Beavis and Butt-Head, Oh Yeah! Cartoons, Cyberchase, King of the Hill, Arthur's Missing Pal, Happily N'Ever After, Random! Cartoons, co-creator of Zack & Quack).

=== July ===
- July 1: Ian Wilcox, American background artist (King of the Hill, Family Guy, The Simpsons), (d. 2022).
- July 3: Jesse Corti, American actor and theater director (voice of LeFou in Beauty and the Beast, March Hare in Bonkers, Angel Rojas in The Batman).
- July 10: Denise Sirkot, American production manager and producer (The Simpsons, The Critic).
- July 22: Willem Dafoe, American actor (voice of The Commandant and Mr. Lassen in The Simpsons, Hunter in Globehunters: An Around the World in 80 Days Adventure, Gill in Finding Nemo and Finding Dory, Rat in Fantastic Mr. Fox, Yves in Birds of a Feather).
- July 24: Hideyuki Umezu, Japanese voice actor (voice of Taifu in Zoids Wild, Principal in Patema Inverted, Saint Valentine in WWW.Working!!, Goenitz in Star Blazers 2202, Arvey Irving in The Sacred Blacksmith, Oscar Bezarius in Pandora Hearts, Collins in Blood+, Japanese dub voice of Shadow Thief in The Batman, Mad Mod in Teen Titans, Mojo in X-Men: The Animated Series, Grandmaster in Ultimate Spider-Man, Zazu in the Lion King franchise), (d. 2024).
- July 26: Michele Pillar, American singer, songwriter and actress (performed the song "(You Make Me Feel Like) A Natural Woman" in The Simpsons episode "Selma's Choice").
- July 29: Dave Stevens, American illustrator and comics artist (Hanna-Barbera), (d. 2008).

=== August ===
- August 3: Corey Burton, American actor (voice of Dale and Zipper in Chip 'n Dale: Rescue Rangers, Brainiac in the DC Animated Universe and Legion of Super Heroes, Shockwave, Sunstreaker, Brawn and Spike Witwicky in The Transformers, Tomax in G.I. Joe: A Real American Hero, Count Dooku and Cad Bane in the Star Wars franchise, the Lizard in Spider-Man, Gruffi Gummi and Toadwart in Adventures of the Gummi Bears, Zeus in Hercules, Gaetan Molière in Atlantis: The Lost Empire and Atlantis: Milo's Return, V.V. Argost in The Secret Saturdays, Malware, Mr. Baumann, and Brainstorm in Ben 10: Omniverse, Liquidator in DuckTales, Invisibo in the Freakazoid! episode "Tomb of Invisibo", continued voice of Captain Hook and Ludwig von Drake).
- August 4: Billy Bob Thornton, American actor (voice of Jigo in Princess Mononoke, Jack in Puss in Boots, Boyce Hubert in the King of the Hill episode "Nine Pretty Darn Angry Men", himself in the American Dad! episode "N.S.A. (No Snooping Allowed)" and the Harley Quinn episode "The 83rd Annual Villy Awards").
- August 7: Wayne Knight, American actor (voice of Tantor in Tarzan, Al McWhiggin in Toy Story 2, Zurg in Buzz Lightyear of Star Command, Mr. Blik in Catscratch, Baron Von Sheldgoose in Legend of the Three Caballeros, Penguin in Harley Quinn, Dojo Kanojo Cho in Xiaolin Showdown, Elihas Starr/Egghead in The Super Hero Squad Show, Jack O'Lantern in The Grim Adventures of Billy & Mandy episode "Billy & Mandy's Jacked-Up Halloween", Captain Goray in the Green Lantern: The Animated Series episode "Into the Abyss").
- August 18: Kōzō Shioya, Japanese voice actor (voice of Majin Buu in Dragon Ball Z), (de. 2026).
- August 19: Peter Gallagher, American actor (voice of Dell Clawthorne in The Owl House, Mole King in The Adventures of Tom Thumb and Thumbelina, Kurt in the Superman: The Animated Series episode "Where There's Smoke", Jared in the Family Guy episode "Lethal Weapons").
- August 21: Gary Apple, American television writer (The Simpsons, Doug, Sabrina: The Animated Series, Oswald, Time Warp Trio).
- August 24: Kevin Dunn, American actor (voice of Tony Hicks in Godzilla: The Series, Howard Hodges in the Batman Beyond episode "Heroes").
- August 29: Vera Lanpher-Pacheco, American animator (Walt Disney Animation Studios) and voice actor (voice of Daphne in Dragon's Lair), (d. 2021).

=== September ===
- September 6: Bruno Bianchi, French animator and comics artist (Inspector Gadget, DIC Entertainment, SIP Animation), (d. 2011).
- September 7: Mira Furlan, Croatian-born American actress and singer (voice of Silver Sable in Spider-Man, Babette in Arcane), (d. 2021).
- September 8: Stephen J. Lineweaver, American production designer, art director and visual consultant (The Simpsons).
- September 9:
  - John Kricfalusi, Canadian former animator (American Pop, Hanna-Barbera, Tiny Toon Adventures, Free Birds, animated the couch gags for The Simpsons episodes "Bart Stops to Smell the Roosevelts" and "Treehouse of Horror XXVI"), storyboard artist (Filmation), blogger, voice actor (voice of Ren Höek and Mr. Horse in The Ren & Stimpy Show and Ren & Stimpy "Adult Party Cartoon", Bowling Alley Guy in The X's episode "Pinheads"), director and producer (Mighty Mouse: The New Adventures, The New Adventures of Beany and Cecil, creator of The Ren & Stimpy Show, The Ripping Friends and Ren & Stimpy "Adult Party Cartoon", co-founder of Spümcø).
  - Edward Hibbert, English actor (voice of Evil the Cat in Earthworm Jim, Zazu in The Lion King II: Simba's Pride and Timon & Pumbaa).
- September 11: Mike Docherty, Scottish comics artist and animator, (d. 2016).
- September 12: Peter Scolari, American actor (voice of John Hammer and The Shark/Gunther Hardwicke in Batman: The Animated Series, Preston Vogel in Gargoyles, Brad in the Duckman episode "From Brad to Worse", Wilford B. Wolf in the Animaniacs episode "Moon Over Minerva", Professor Higgenson in the What's New, Scooby-Doo? episode "Scooby-Doo Christmas", Ray Palmer/Atom in the Batman: The Brave and the Bold episode "Sword of the Atom!"), (d. 2021).
- September 15:
  - Bruce Reitherman, American actor and son of Wolfgang Reitherman (voice of Christopher Robin in Winnie the Pooh and the Honey Tree and Mowgli in The Jungle Book).
  - Nathan Carlson, American voice actor, musician and writer (voice of Dr. Cyborn in Skeleton Warriors, Weatherman, Sports Announcer, Spin & Speak and Husband in Rugrats, Whizzer in The Swan Princess III: The Mystery of the Enchanted Treasure, various characters in Hi Hi Puffy AmiYumi, Goofy Grape and Lefty Lemon in Funny Face).
- September 17: Charles Martinet, American voice actor (voice of Mario, Luigi, Wario and Waluigi in the Mario franchise, Senator Wilson Philips and Speedwagon Foundation Pilot in JoJo's Bizarre Adventure, Magenta in Dragon Ball Super: Super Hero, Mario and Luigi's Father and Giuseppe in The Super Mario Bros. Movie).
- September 18: David Mirkin, American screenwriter, director and producer (The Simpsons).
- September 26: George Daugherty, American conductor (Looney Tunes), director, writer and producer (Peter and the Wolf, Sagwa, the Chinese Siamese Cat).

=== October ===
- October 6: Joel Paley, American screenwriter (Cats Don't Dance), (d. 2025).
- October 12: Russell Calabrese, American animator (The Berenstain Bears specials, Strawberry Shortcake in Big Apple City, Warner Bros. Animation, Garfield Gets a Life, The Thief and the Cobbler), storyboard artist (Animaniacs, The Ant Bully), background artist (Animaniacs, Pinky and the Brain), animation checker (Dan Vs.), sheet timer (Film Roman, Warner Bros. Animation, Johnny Bravo, Disney Television Animation, Jackie Chan Adventures, Cartoon Network Studios), writer (Johnny Bravo) and director (Warner Bros. Animation, Johnny Bravo, The Grim Adventures of Billy & Mandy, Camp Lazlo, Fanboy & Chum Chum, Phineas and Ferb, Randy Cunningham: 9th Grade Ninja).
- October 14: Arleen Sorkin, American actress (voice of Harley Quinn in the DC Animated Universe, Ms. Bambi in Batman: Mask of the Phantasm, Veronica in the Taz-Mania episode "Bewitched Bob"), and screenwriter (Tiny Toon Adventures), (d. 2023).
- October 20: Thomas Newman, American composer (Pixar).
- October 29: Gary Leib, American cartoonist, musician and animator (founder of the animation studio Twinkle), (d. 2021).
- October 30: Daryl L. Coley, American singer (voice of Bleeding Gums Murphy in The Simpsons episode "Dancin' Homer"), (d. 2016).

=== November ===
- November 3: Flint Dille, American screenwriter (Sunbow Productions, An American Tail: Fievel Goes West).
- November 13: Whoopi Goldberg, American actress, comedienne, author and television personality (voice of Gaia in seasons 1-3 of Captain Planet and the Planeteers, Shenzi in The Lion King and The Lion King 1½, Fantasy in The Pagemaster, Mother Olm in Amphibia, Zenobia the Hoodoo Diva and Mother in Happily Ever After: Fairy Tales for Every Child, Ghost of Christmas Present in A Christmas Carol, Stormella in Rudolph the Red-Nosed Reindeer: The Movie, Ranger Margaret in The Rugrats Movie, Mrs. Peck in Our Friend, Martin, Ransome in Foxbusters, Miss Clavel in Madeline: Lost in Paris, Cyberina in Pinocchio 3000, Ermintrude in Doogal, Darlin in Everyone's Hero, Stretch in Toy Story 3, The Tower in The Little Engine That Could, Magic Mirror in The 7D, Barb in Summer Camp Island, Mama Zho Zi in A Warrior's Tail, Gamemaster in Miles from Tomorrowland, Meg and Miss Bee in The Stinky & Dirty Show, Lama in Elena of Avalor, Captain in Luck, Deborah Samson in the Liberty's Kids episode "Deborah Samson: Soldier of the Revolution", Dorothy in the Animals episode "Dog.", Mikhaela in the BoJack Horseman episode "The Light Bulb Scene", Marian Pouncy and Poundcakes in the M.O.D.O.K. episode "If Saturday Be... for the Boys!", Narrator in the Tuca & Bertie episode "The Flood", herself in the Dr. Katz Professional Therapist episode "Lerapy", the Celebrity Deathmatch episode "Celebrity Deathmatch Special Report", and the Scooby-Doo and Guess Who? episode "The Nightmare Ghost of Psychic U!").
- November 15: Michael Peraza, Cuban-American animator, art director, conceptual artist and animation historian (Walt Disney Company).
- November 19: Debbi Besserglick, Israeli actress (Hebrew dub voice of Arthur Read), (d. 2005).
- November 25:
  - Cheri Steinkellner, American television writer and producer (co-creator of Teacher's Pet).
  - Don Hahn, American film producer (Walt Disney Animation Studios).
- November 27: Bill Nye, American television personality and engineer (voice of Professor Rubicon in Miles from Tomorrowland, himself in the American Dad! episode "Brave N00b World" and the Scooby-Doo and Guess Who? episode "Space Station Scooby!").
- November 29: Howie Mandel, Canadian comedian, television personality, screenwriter, actor, producer, director, entrepreneur, game show host and author (voice of Skeeter, Animal and Bunsen in Muppet Babies, Jack in The Tangerine Bear, Comet in Timothy Tweedle the First Christmas Elf, Spencer in Pinocchio 3000, Brian Booyah in The Dating Guy, FBI Agent Rick Chickmagnet in the Fugget About It episode "The Fugly American", himself in the Glenn Martin, DDS episode "Bust 'Em Up", the Robot Chicken episode "3 2 1 2 333, 222, 3...66?", and the Harley Quinn episode "A High Bar", creator and voice of Bobby Generic and Howard Generic in Bobby's World).
- November 30: Kevin Conroy, American actor (voice of Batman in the DC Animated Universe, DC Universe Animated Original Movies, Batman: Strange Days, Justice League Action, Teen Titans Go!, and Scooby-Doo and Guess Who?, Phantom Stranger and Batman of Zur-En-Arrh in Batman: The Brave and the Bold, Captain Sunshine in The Venture Bros., Prismal in Welcome to the Wayne, Mer-Man in the Masters of the Universe: Revelation episode "The Most Dangerous Man in Eternia", Hordak in the He-Man and the Masters of the Universe episode "The Beginning of the End, Part 2", Bellicus in the Ben 10: Alien Force episode "X = Ben + 2", John Grayson in The Batman episode "A Matter of Family"), (d. 2022).

=== December ===
- December 3: Andrea Romano, American voice director (Hanna-Barbera, Warner Bros. Animation).
- December 5: Richard Gibbs, American music producer and composer (The Simpsons, 101 Dalmatians II: Patch's London Adventure).
- December 6: Steven Wright, American actor, comedian, writer and film producer (voice of Speed in The Swan Princess, Bootes in Hercules, Meh Meh in The Emoji Movie, Bogeyman in the Happily Ever After: Fairy Tales for Every Child episode "Mother Goose: A Rappin' and Rhymin' Special", Danny in the Aqua Teen Hunger Force episode "Allen: Part One", himself in the Dr. Katz, Professional Therapist episodes "Bystander Ben" and "Mask", and The Simpsons episode "The Last Temptation of Krust").
- December 14: Stefan Gossler, German actor (German dub voice of Master Monkey in the Kung Fu Panda franchise, King Julien in the Madagascar franchise, Splinter in Teenage Mutant Ninja Turtles: Mutant Mayhem, Cell in Dragon Ball Z), (d. 2026).
- December 16:
  - Xander Berkeley, American actor (voice of Iago/Coldsteel in Gargoyles, Mysterio in The Spectacular Spider-Man, Sinestro in Batman: The Brave and the Bold, Morgg and Trukk in the Ben 10: Ultimate Alien episode "...Nor Iron Bars a Cage").
  - Catherine Peterson, American ink & paint artist (Hanna-Barbera, The Secret of NIMH, Shelley Duvall's Bedtime Stories, Cool World) and animation checker (Hanna-Barbera, Walt Disney Animation Studios), (d. 2021).
- December 18: Mitch Schauer, American animator, storyboard artist (Hanna-Barbera, Garfield and Friends, Bobby's World, Tom and Jerry: The Movie, Bionicle: Mask of Light, Niko and the Sword of Light), writer (3-2-1 Penguins!), director (Garfield and Friends), producer (Wild West C.O.W.-Boys of Moo Mesa, Freakazoid!, Hulk and the Agents of S.M.A.S.H., creator of The Angry Beavers), and voice actor (voice of various characters in The Angry Beavers, Lonnie Tallbutt in Freakazoid!).
- December 19: Bronwen Barry, Canadian-American animator (Hanna-Barbera, Filmation, Tummy Trouble, The Simpsons, Rugrats, Looney Tunes, FernGully: The Last Rainforest, The Thief and the Cobbler, Nest Family Entertainment, Rich Animation Studios, Looney Tunes: Back in Action, Curious George, Family Guy), storyboard artist (King of the Hill, Happiness Is a Warm Blanket, Charlie Brown, Randy Cunningham: 9th Grade Ninja, Kulipari, The 7D, Lego DC Super Hero Girls: Super-Villain High) and character designer (Ghostbusters, She-Ra: Princess of Power, Rich Animation Studios).
- December 21: Jane Kaczmarek, American actress (voice of Red Jessica in Jake and the Never Land Pirates, Constance Harm in The Simpsons, Judge in the Animals episode "The Trial", Coach Jackie in the Penn Zero: Part-Time Hero episode "Ultrahyperball").
- December 24:
  - David Richardson, American television writer and producer (The Simpsons, F Is for Family), (d. 2021).
  - Randy Crenshaw, American actor and singer (voice of Mr. Hyde in The Nightmare Before Christmas, additional voices in Family Guy, Centaurworld, House of Mouse, Dexter's Laboratory, The Ren & Stimpy Show, and Freakazoid!).
- December 29: Dan Kuenster, American animator and director (Sullivan Bluth Studios).
- December 30: Sheryl Lee Ralph, American actress (voice of Rita in Oliver & Company, Aunt Dee in The Proud Family, Cheetah in Justice League and Justice League Unlimited, Amanda Waller in Young Justice, Trina Jessup in Static Shock).

=== Specific date unknown ===
- Antón Cancelas, Spanish actor (Spanish dub synchronisation of Saint Seiya), (d. 2021).
- Kent Melton, American animation sculptor (The Completely Mental Misadventures of Ed Grimley, Tiny Toon Adventures, Aladdin, Thumbelina, The Lion King, A Troll in Central Park, Pocahontas, The Hunchback of Notre Dame, Hercules, Mulan, The Prince of Egypt, Tarzan, The Road to El Dorado, Spirit: Stallion of the Cimarron, Atlantis: The Lost Empire, Treasure Planet, The Incredibles, ParaNorman, Coraline), (d. 2024).
- Marc Scott Zicree, American author writer, and screenwriter (Hanna-Barbera, DIC Entertainment).

== Deaths ==
=== July ===
- July 4: Perce Pearce, American animation director, producer, writer (Walt Disney Company) and actor (voice of the mole in Bambi), dies at age 55.

=== August ===
- August 25: Kitazawa Rakuten, Japanese manga artist and nihonga-style painter, considered the first professional cartoonist in Japan and the founding father of modern manga, (trained many young manga artists and animators, including Hekoten Shimokawa, the creator of Japan's first cartoon animation), dies at age 79.

=== October ===
- October 24: Yuri Zhelyabuzhsky, Russian animator, cinematographer, film director and screenwriter (directed The Skating Rink, one of the first traditionally animated Soviet cartoons, and Bolvashka's Adventures, the first Soviet short film that combined live-action and stop motion animation), dies at age 66.

=== Specific date unknown ===
- Erich F.T. Schenk, German-American painter, illustrator, animator and comics artist (Fleischer Studios), dies at age 53 or 54.

== See also ==
- List of anime by release date (1946–1959)
