= Telescreen (company) =

Dutch distribution company

Telescreen BV
- Formerly: Telecable Benelux B.V. (1983–1994)
- Type: Subsidiary
- Industry: Animation, Production
- Predecessor: Egmont Imagination (1996–2003)
- Founded: 1983; 43 years ago
- Founders: Dennis Livson; Jos Kaandorp
- Defunct: 2020; 6 years ago
- Fate: Absorbed into Studio 100 Media and Studio 100
- Headquarters: Hilversum, Netherlands
- Area served: Worldwide
- Products: Children's television shows
- Parent: Mitsui (1993–1998); Palm Plus Multimedia (1998–2005); Made 4 Entertainment (2008–2020)

Telescreen B.V. (formerly known as Telecable Benelux B.V.) is a Dutch television production, distribution company, and animation studio. It specialises in producing and distributing kids and family entertainment. It was established in 1983 by Finnish entrepreneur and producer Dennis Livson and Jos Kaandorp as an independent production and distribution company. It was acquired in turn by Japanese firm Mitsui, Dutch production company Palm Plus Multimedia who handled Telescreen until 2005 before being sold to German company Made 4 Entertainment (m4e) in 2008. It has produced and distributed children's TV series such as Miffy, Moomin, and Alfred J. Kwak.

The international Consumer Products department managed and developed the merchandising programs of animated properties worldwide, such as Frog & Friends and Lizzie McGuire.

As a licensing agent, they also represent some of the world's major entertainment companies in the Benelux territory, such as BBC Worldwide, Turner Broadcasting, Chapman Entertainment and Aardman Animations.

The company services children's entertainment production from animation production, TV distribution, home entertainment, consumer products and royalty administration to artwork coordination and creation.

== History ==
Telescreen B.V. was founded in 1983 under the name Telecable Benelux BV by Dennis Livson and Jos Kaandorp. In 1994, the name Telecable Benelux B.V. was changed into Telescreen B.V. Soon thereafter, Livson sold the company to the giant Japanese entertainment firm Mitsui & Company, which acquired the company through a spin-off subsidiary, Pri-mation Media B.V.

In December 1998, Mitsui sold Pri-Mation Media and Telescreen to Dutch producer and distributor Palm Plus Produkties, marking Palm Plus' entry into the kids and family entertainment market. In March 2003, Telescreen and Palm Plus Produkties acquired the Egmont Imagination catalog outside the Nordic territories from Danish publishing company Egmont Group. Former Egmont Imagination president Tom van Waveren was appointed as Telescreen's director of co-productions. He left at the start of November 2004 to form his own production company, Hoek, Line and Thinker, taking over Telescreen's upcoming production Skunk Fu.

On February 25, 2005, Palm Plus Multimedia sold 49% of Telescreen via a management buyout, after Telescreen's CEO Ruud Van Breugel had stepped down. Tom van Waveren returned to the former as its CCO. In September 2006, Telescreen formed a partnership with Los Angeles-based entertainment studio Suppertime Entertainment to co-produce and distribute an animated series based on the H.B. Homzie book series Alien Clones From Outer Space.

In December 2008, the German brand management and media company Made 4 Entertainment (m4e) acquired Telescreen. Telescreen retained their properties. One year later, Telescreen took over international distribution of m4e's TV, new media and home entertainment rights outside of Germany. Telescreen's licensing division Telescreen Licensing & Merchandising was renamed to Telescreen Consumer Products following the restructure. On March 31, Telescreen and m4e acquired the worldwide rights to the Pinkeltje franchise.

On April 5, 2011, m4e's television division bought the back catalogue of German brand management company TV-Loonland AG. Telescreen took over international distribution of the TV Loonland library.

In late-February 2017, Belgian production group Studio 100, via its global distribution division Studio 100 Media (now Studio 100 International), acquired a 68% stake in m4e, including Telescreen and the Egmont Imagination and TV-Loonland libraries.

== List of productions ==
=== Television ===
Title	Years	Network	Notes
Ox Tales	1987–1988	VARA; TV Tokyo (Japan)	
Wowser	1988–1989	TV Tokyo (Japan)	co-production with J.C.Staff
Alfred J. Kwak	1989–1990	VARA; TV Tokyo (Japan); ZDF (Germany); TVE1 (Spain)	co-production with VARA, ZDF, Televisión Española, and TV Tokyo
Star Street	1989–1990	Veronica	
Moomin	1990–1992	VARA; TV Tokyo (Japan); Yle TV1 (Finland); La 2 (Spain)	co-production with TV Tokyo, Yle, Marina Productions, and Televisión Española; Also known as Tales from Moominvalley; Currently owned by Moomin Characters Ltd
Miffy: The Classic Series	1992–1993	KRO	co-production with Mercis BV, Kodansha and Gene Deitch Studios
Lizzie McGuire	2001–2004	Disney Channel	Inherited from Egmont Imagination co-production with Disney Channel and Stan Ragow Productions; Currently owned by Studio 100 International and Disney Platform Distribution
Miffy and Friends	2003–2005	KRO	co-production with Mercis BV
The Paz Show	2003–2006	CITV (United Kingdom); Discovery Kids (United States)	Inheritated from Egmont Imagination co-production with King Rollo Films
Frog & Friends	2008	KRO	co-production with Rights at Work, Max Velthuijs Foundation and A. Film Production
Miffy's Adventures Big and Small	2015–2017	KRO-NCRV; Tiny Pop (United Kingdom)	co-production with Mercis BV and Blue Zoo Animation Studio
Plonsters	1999	TBA	Produced by Egmont Imagination and Anima Studio for Film & Grafik GmbH

=== Films ===
Title	Release date	Distributor	Notes
Comet in Moominland	August 8, 1992 (Japan); April 2, 1993 (Netherlands)	Shochiku (Japan); Finnkino (Finland)	co-production with Telescreen Japan
Miffy the Movie	January 30, 2013	Warner Bros Pictures Benelux; 6 Sales (International)	as Telescreen Filmproducties co-production with Mercis BV, KRO and A. Film Production
The Little Vampire 3D	October 4, 2017; October 26, 2017 (Germany)	Entertainment One Benelux; Universum Film (Germany)	co-production with First Look, Comet Film, A. Film Production, Cinema Management Group, Cool Beans, Rothkirch Cartoon-Film and Ambient Entertainment

- Flying Rhino Junior High (1998–2000)
- Pokémon (1999–2001) (Dutch dub only; Seasons 1-3 only)
- Even Stevens (2000–2003)
- Anton (2001)
- Hans Christian Andersen – The Fairytaler (2003)
- Yellow Giraffe's Animal Stories (2003)
- Het Zandkasteel (2005–present)
- Rudolf – the world's most determined door-to-door salesman (2010)
- Conni (2011–2015)
