= Miffy the Movie =

- Theatrical release poster
- Directed by: Hans Perk
- Screenplay by: Fine Trossèl; James Still
- Story by: Dick Bruna
- Based on: Miffy by Dick Bruna
- Produced by: Sjoerd Raemakers; Chris Brouwer
- Starring: Eva Poppink; Marc-Marie Huijbregts; Hanna Verboom; Barry Atsma; Isa Hoes
- Edited by: Hans Perk
- Music by: Tom van Beers
- Production companies: Telescreen Filmproducties; Katholieke Radio Omroep; A. Film A/S; AB Studio Latvia; Mercis BV
- Distributed by: Warner Bros. Pictures
- Release date: 30 January 2013
- Running time: 70 minutes
- Country: Netherlands
- Language: Dutch
- Budget: €4 million
- Box office: $1.3 million

Miffy the Movie (Dutch: Nijntje de film) is a 2013 Dutch stop motion animated family film, based on the Miffy character created by Dick Bruna. Produced by KRO and A. Film A/S, the movie debuted on 30 January 2013 in the Netherlands.

The series is animated in the style of Miffy and Friends, the first television adaptation of Miffy.

== Synopsis ==
The titular rabbit, Miffy, goes on a treasure hunt at a zoo. Along with her friends Snuffy the dog, Melanie the rabbit, and Grunty the pig, she is able to complete the quest through problem-solving.

== Voice cast ==
| Original Dutch voice actor | English voice actor | Role |
|---|---|---|
| Eva Poppink | Sandra Agababyan | Miffy |
| Marc-Marie Huijbregts | Reinder van der Naalt | Snuffy the Dog |
| Hanna Verboom | Sophie London | Melanie |
| Barry Atsma | Kelton Washington | Father Bunny |
| Isa Hoes | Julia Lipman | Mother Bunny |

== Release ==
The film was first announced on 18 May 2010, with an expected release date of November 2011. Production was delayed for unknown reasons, and the first trailer for Miffy the Movie was released in 2012. The film was first screened in the Netherlands, its country of origin, and was distributed by Warner Bros. Pictures. On 22 March 2013, the film was released in Japan. In Canada, Miffy the Movie premiered as part of the 2013 Toronto International Film Festival. The movie saw its Australian release on 11 May 2013; for this country, Miffy the Movie was distributed by Transmission Films.

The film was released in several additional countries in 2015, to celebrate the sixtieth anniversary of the "Miffy" character. The movie was released in Poland on 1 June 2015 and in the United Kingdom on 21 June 2015.

A Dutch-language DVD was released on 26 June 2013 in the Netherlands. A German disc was released on 9 March 2014 and a Region 1 DVD featuring an English audio track was released on 2 December 2014 in North America, despite the film not getting a theatrical release in Germany and the United States.

== Accolades ==
List of awards and nominations
| Award | Category | Recipients and nominees | Result |
|---|---|---|---|
| Cinekid Festival | Best Dutch Film | Hans Perk | Won |
| Netherlands Film Festival | Audience Award | Hans Perk | Nominated |
