= Panda Bear in Africa =

2024 Dutch animated film

- Dutch theatrical release poster
- Dutch: Pandabeer in Afrika
- Directed by: Richard Claus; Karsten Kiilerich
- Written by: Richard Claus; Karsten Kiilerich; Rob Sprackling
- Produced by: Chantal Nissen; Anders Mastrup; Richard Claus; Jean Labadie
- Starring: Yootha Wong-Loi-Sing; Maurits Delchot; Namisa Mdalose; Georgina Verbaan
- Cinematography: Niels Grønlykke
- Edited by: Job ter Burg
- Music by: Vidjay Beerepoot
- Production companies: A. Film Production; Cool Beans; Le Pacte; Katuni Animation; Comet Film
- Distributed by: WW Entertainment (Netherlands); Angel Distribution (Denmark); Le Pacte (France); Cinema Management Group (Worldwide sales)
- Release dates: February 15, 2024 (Berlin); October 16, 2024 (Netherlands)
- Running time: 84 minutes
- Countries: Denmark; Netherlands; France; Germany; Estonia
- Languages: Dutch; English
- Box office: $6.3 million

Panda Bear in Africa (Dutch: Pandabeer in Afrika) is a 2024 animated adventure film directed by Richard Claus and Karsten Kiilerich with story by Claus, Kiierich and Rob Sprackling. The film is an international co-production between Denmark, the Netherlands, France, Germany, and Estonia and it follows a panda cub who travels to Africa in order to rescue his dragon friend who has been kidnapped. The film was first released in Germany at the European Film Market during a screening at CinemaxX in Berlin on February 15, then on August 7 in France and October 16 in the Netherlands.

== Plot ==
When the young and not so adventurous panda bear Pang discovers that his best friend Jielong the dragon has been kidnapped, he follows her all the way from China to Africa. On the way he finds a world completely unknown to him as he faces frightening kudus, dancing ostriches, and the evil lion Malume. With newfound friends Jojo, an unreliable monkey, and Niala, a lonesome hyena, he needs to figure out how to defeat Malume, free Jielong and save Niala's family.

== Voice cast ==
- Yootha Wong-Loi-Sing as Pang, a panda cub wearing a red cape
- Maurits Delchot as Jojo, a talapoin
- Thom Hoffman as Xing-Xing, a orangutan merchant that leads a boat that helped Pang go to Africa and Panda Grocekeeper
- Silas Lekgoathi as Malume, a villainous lion that rules Africa, Lekgoathi also voices Mr. Dung Beetle and Lmazi, Niala's father
- Namisa Mdalose as Ade, Malume's adolescent nephew
- Candice Modiselle as Niala, a spotted hyena, Modiselle also voices Niala in her younger self, Mrs. Hippo, Mrs. Dung Beetle and Ade's mother
- Sthandile Nkosi as Kabora, a Gelada baboon who works for Malume and Imayi, Niala´'s mother and Vulture
- Thulani Nzonzo as Mpho, an overweight Nile crocodile who works for Malume
- James Weebo as Darius, a dancing ostrich who kidnaps both Pang and Jojo
- Georgina Verbaan as Jielong, a female Chinese dragon, Verbaan also voices Ade in his younger self and Biyu, Pang's mother
- Charles Ouda as Abu, an Greater kudu who works for Darius, Ouda also voices Mr. Python, an African rock python and Meerkat Chief and Jackal 3
- Lungile Lallie as Jackal 1
- Angel Orugbo as Camel, a nameless camel that works as a taxi and Jackal 2
- Adrian Pang as Kang, Pang's father
- Joyce W. Musoke as Mrs. Python, a female African rock python
- Thulani Nzono as Ade's father, Mr. Hippo and Male Lion
- Kok-Hwa-Lie as Panda Grocekeeper 2

== Production ==
The film´s history begins from Richard Claus and his Kenyan wife that told a bedtime story involving African animals to the couple´s 6-years old daughter. The directors described the pitch as a creative cross between The Lion King, Kung Fu Panda, and The Jungle Book. It subverts the traditional "hero's journey" by taking a native Asian animal and dropping him completely out of his comfort zone into a vibrant, unfamiliar African ecosystem. Combined with the years of work Claus had since the production of The Little Vampire 3D. Although it is not said what part of Africa the film is set, according to producers to the Czech distribution studio, Bohemian Pictures. Ping enters the coast of East Africa, until he journeys down to the savannas of Southern Cape.

While most of the film´s production is done in the Netherlands (especially at Katuni and Cool Beans´s studios in Amsterdam), Denmark handled storyboarding, character design layout, pre-production editing, and major 3D character animation blocks. Germany handled production pipelines, visual effects asset coordination, France post-production pipeline and financing. As well Estonia handling parts of the movie animation at the local A. Film´s facility A. Film Estonia alongside The Hague-based animation studio PHUNK Animation Studio. The film was animated using Autodesk Maya and 3ds Max. Adobe Substance 3D Painter was utilized for the detailed textures on animal fur, feathers, and dragon scales

To capture both global marketability and localized authenticity, the voice acting production was masterfully split between Dutch actors of Chinese descent (for the Asian animals) and native South African talent (for the African animals).

== Reception ==
A review in Le Figaro praised the joyful spirit of the film. Télérama found the production predictable. A mixed review in Le Monde noted that all characters were very talkative.
