= Reinhoudt =

Reinhoudt is a surname. Notable people with the surname include:

- Don Reinhoudt (1945–2023), American powerlifter and strongman
- Engel Reinhoudt (1946–2020), Dutch troubadour and dialect writer
