= Miffy's Adventures Big and Small =

- Genre: Animated television series
- Created by: Dick Bruna
- Written by: Ciaran Murtagh; Andrew Jones
- Directed by: Adam Shaw; Helen Arntsen; Chris Drew
- Starring: Arisha Choudhury; Isla Gudgeon; Duke Davis; Teresa Gallagher
- Narrated by: Dan Chambers
- Theme music composer: Tom van Beers
- Opening theme: Miffy Theme
- Ending theme: Miffy Theme (instrumental)
- Composer: David Schweitzer
- Countries of origin: Netherlands; United Kingdom
- Original languages: Dutch; English
- No. of seasons: 3
- No. of episodes: 104

Production
- Executive producers: Frank Padberg; Marja Kerkhof
- Editor: Judith Allen
- Running time: 7 minutes
- Production companies: Blue-Zoo Animation Studio; Mercis BV

Original release
- Network: KRO-NCRV (Netherlands); Tiny Pop (UK)
- Release: 2 October 2015 – 16 June 2019

Related
- Miffy and Friends

Miffy's Adventures Big and Small (Note: Dutch: Nijntjes avonturen groot en klein; Swedish: Miffys äventyr stora och små) is a Dutch-British animated children's television series based on the Miffy book series by Dutch artist Dick Bruna, and the continuation of Miffy and Friends (2003–07). The series ran 2 October 2015 to 16 June 2019 on Tiny Pop in the UK and aired on KRO-NCRV in the Netherlands and on the Nick Jr. Channel in the US.

== Cast ==
- Bert Davis as Dan
- Bob Golding as Poppy
- Teresa Gallagher as Poppy, Aunt Alice, the School Teacher
- Rasmus Hardiker as Boris
- Esther Coles as Barbara
- Arisha Choudhury as Miffy
- Dan Chambers as Miffy's Dad, Narrator
- Jonell Elliot as Miffy's Mum, Miffy's Grandma
- Peter Dickson as Uncle Pilot, Miffy's Grandpa
- Shanti Deen-Ellis as Melanie
- Leon Williams as Miffy's Grandpa
- Isla Gudgeon as Grunty
- Caron Pascoe as Snuffy

== Episodes ==
The series had three seasons, each consisting of 13 seven-minute segments.

== Production ==
Production began in April 2014, when Mercis BV announced a new reboot series that would bring its famous Miffy franchise into CGI for the first time with Mercis BV had appointed London-based British animation production studio Blue Zoo Animation Studio to produce a new CGI animated series featuring its character Miffy with scripts being developed by Blue Zoo's British writing team and would be completed for a 2015 release as German media management company M4E and its Dutch distribution subsidiary Telescreen alongside Mercis BV would jointly distribute the series. The series was publicly announced in October of the same year, at the MIPCOM trade show in Cannes, France. At the convention, the series' launch date was announced for autumn 2015 to coincide with the sixtieth anniversary of the Miffy character. 52 segments were ordered in 2014, with an additional 26 segments later in 2016.

One year later in August 2015 during the 60th anniversary of the Miffy franchise, it was announced that Sony Pictures Television through its British children's channel Tiny Pop had picked up the upcoming CGI animated series now entitled Miffy’s Adventures Big and Small from Mercis BV.

In June 2016, Mercis BV, London-based Blue Zoo Animation Studio and German kids & family entertainment studio Made 4 Entertainment (m4e) renewed the series for a third season with a delivery date set for a July 2017 release. The following year in February 2017 during production of the third season of Miffy's Adventures Big and Small, Belgian production outfit Studio 100 under its German distribution division Studio 100 Media had brought a majority stake in the series co-producer m4e AG and the series itself with Studio 100 Media would take over distribution for the third series

== Broadcast ==
Miffy's Adventures Big and Small first aired on 2 October 2015. The series aired on Sony's Tiny Pop network in the UK, on ABC Kids in Australia, on e-Junior in the United Arab Emirates, on Akili TV in Kenya, on the Nick Jr. Channel in the United States, on NET25 in the Philippines, on Tooniverse in South Korea, and on TVOKids in Canada. ABC released the series in Australia and PBS Distribution released the first two seasons in the US.
