= Hans Perk =

Hans Perk (31 December 1961, Amsterdam) is a Danish–Dutch animated film director, animator and editor.

== Early life ==
Hans Perk grew up first in Amsterdam, then from 1966 in Huizen, Noord Holland, and went to elementary school at the Wilhelminaschool, Bussum, and high school at the Goois Lyceum, Bussum, then studied art history at the Universiteit van Amsterdam. During his high school days he got interested in animation, especially Disney animation.

== Career ==
In a memoir, Hans Perk recounts that in 1978 he became a student of and later assistant animator for the Danish animated film director Børge Ring, working on feature films, commercials and the short film Anna & Bella. In 1988, he co-founded A. Film Production. In 2013, he directed Miffy the Movie, which was nominated for several awards, and won Best Dutch Film at the Cinekid Festival. Hans Perk lived in Denmark 1984-2019 and since 2019 lives in California, USA.

== Selected filmography ==
| Year | Film | Credited as | | |
| Year | Film | Director | Editor | Animator |
|---|---|---|---|---|
| 1983 | Curse of the Pink Panther | No | No | Yes |
| 1986 | Valhalla | No | No | Yes (Note: As director of animation) |
| 2013 | Miffy the Movie | Yes | Yes | Yes |
| 2015 | Albert | No | Yes | No |
| 2017 | The Incredible Story of the Giant Pear | No | Yes | No |
| 2018 | Up and Away | No | Yes | No |

== See also ==
- Karsten Kiilerich–co-founder of A. Film Production, frequent collaborator
