= Egmont Imagination =

Defunct animation production arm of Egmont

- Genre: Animation
- Founded: 1995
- Founder: Ulla Brockenhuus-Schack
- Fate: Shuttered as part of Egmont's restructure; library sold to Telescreen
- Successor: Telescreen BV
- Parent: Egmont Group

Egmont Imagination was the international animation production and distribution subsidiary of the Danish media giant Egmont Group, specializing in children's multimedia content. It was founded in 1995 and headquartered in Copenhagen, focused on creating animated series for children, and was closed in 2003 after the company was restructured and its library was sold to Telescreen.

== History ==
Egmont Imagination was founded in 1995 by Ulla Brockenhuus-Schack when its parent Egmont Group had announced its entry into the children's animation industry by forming a division that would adapt children's books into television series and merchandising. Its first production was Mumble Bumble, which was released in 1998, and was produced with Canadian studio Cinar.

In 1999, Egmont Imagination appointed former Nelvana director Tom van Waveren to head up the animation unit under the role of President with him overseeing production of the company's future projects.

In May 2001, following the release of Egmont Imagination's feature film Help! I'm a Fish by Nordisk Film, the company announced a television adaptation of the feature film, consisting of twenty-six episodes, with A. Film co-producing it, but the series was never made. That month Egmont Imagination had named former Team Dandelion sales executive Caroline Stephenson to manage its operations in the Southern Europe and Latin American markets.

In January 2002, Egmont Imagination partnered with San Francisco-based American entertainment company WildBrain to develop and produce programming with Egmont handling distribution from its British office.

In August 2002, when Egmont Imagination's parent Egmont Group merged its entertainment arm Egmont Entertainment into its film and television production/distribution subsidiary Nordisk Film, Egmont shuttered Egmont Imagination and appointed Nordisk Film to assume and absorb most of Egmont Imagination's projects. The following month, Egmont Imagination began scalling its production and development during Egmont's restructuring.

In March 2003, after Egmont shuttered Egmont Imagination, Egmont had sold the catalogue of its animation arm to Dutch animation company Telescreen.

== Productions ==
| Title | Years | Network | Notes |
|---|---|---|---|
| Mumble Bumble | 1998–1999 | CBC | co-production with Cinar |
| Rex the Runt | 1998–2005 | BBC One/BBC Four | co-production with Aardman Animations |
| The Upstairs Downstairs Bears | 2001–2002 | ITV | co-production with Cinar, FilmFair, Scottish Television and Magination Productions |
| Tracey McBean | 2002 | ABC Kids | co-production with Southern Star Group and Shanghai Animation Film Studio |
