= A. Film Production =

Danish animation studio and production company

A. Film Production A/S
- Industry: Animation
- Genre: Traditional and CGI Animation
- Founded: 1 August 1988; 38 years ago
- Founder: Stefan Fjeldmark: Karsten Kiilerich; Jørgen Lerdam; Hans Perk; Anders Mastrup
- Headquarters: Dannebrogsgade 1, Copenhagen, Denmark
- Website: afilm.com

A. Film Production A/S (previously A. Film A/S, A. Film ApS and A. Film I/S) is a Danish animation studio and production company currently based in Copenhagen, Denmark. Affiliated to the Copenhagen studio are A. Film Estonia located in Estonia and A. Film L.A., Inc. is in Southern California. It produces traditional and CGI animation for feature films, television, advertising and games. The studio's notable original features include Checkered Ninja, Help! I'm a Fish, Jungledyret Hugo and Terkel in Trouble. A pig serves as a mascot for said company.

== History ==
The studio was founded on 1 August 1988 by animators Stefan Fjeldmark, Karsten Kiilerich, Jørgen Lerdam and Hans Perk and producer Anders Mastrup who met while working on the 1986 film Valhalla based on the Danish comics of the same name, and was originally headquartered at Tagensvej 85 in Copenhagen. In 1995, the Danish media corporation Egmont purchased 50% of A. Film and moved A. Film under the umbrella of its film division, Nordisk Film. Stefan Fjeldmark left A. Film in 2008 to pursue a career in live-action. Several animators who began their careers at A. Film became well established at the Disney and DreamWorks studios. Since about 1995, the company's logo is a grinning pig, designed by Finn Skovgaard.

In 2010, A. Film A/S split into two companies: A. Film Production A/S which continues independent film production and is now located at Dannebrogsgade 1 in Copenhagen, and A. Film A/S under Nordisk Film which manages the rights of the earlier productions. The A. Film group of companies, with A. Film Production A/S as its base, includes the independent studios A. Film Eesti in Tallinn, Estonia (est. 1994) and A. Film L.A., Inc. in Los Angeles, California (est. 2008). In Berlin, Germany, A. Film used to be part of the studio Friendly Fritz. It previously owned studios in Riga, Latvia (2002–2010) and Munich, Germany (2006–2009). The A. Film companies also worked as a subcontractor on 28 films including FernGully: The Last Rainforest, Hans Christian Andersen's Thumbelina, Asterix Conquers America, The Little Punker, The Secret Weapon, Once Upon a Forest, Felidae, Balto, The Iron Giant, The Princess and the Goblin (1993), Tarzan II, Curious George, The Pebble and the Penguin, A Troll in Central Park, All Dogs Go To Heaven 2, Quest for Camelot and Eight Crazy Nights. In 2007, A. Film A/S provided services on Disney's Goofy: How to Hook Up Your Home Theater.

A. Film Production A/S has recently released several feature films including Niko 2: Little Brother, Big Trouble, Albert, Alfie Atkins: Hocus Pocus and the stop-motion film Miffy the Movie.

== Filmography ==
Note: This section lists films produced by the company.

=== Traditionally animated films ===
- The Princess and the Goblin (1991, Pannonia Film Studio (Hungary), S4C (United Kingdom) and NHK (Japan))
- The Magic Voyage (1992)
- FernGully: The Last Rainforest (1992)
- The Little Punker (1992)
- Jungledyret (1993) (U.S. title: Go Hugo Go)
- Once Upon a Forest (1993)
- Felidae (1994)
- Thumbelina (1994)
- Asterix Conquers America (1994)
- A Troll in Central Park (1994)
- The Pebble and the Penguin (1995)
- Balto (1995)
- Jungledyret 2 – den store filmhelt (1996) (U.S. title: Hugo The Movie Star)
- All Dogs Go to Heaven 2 (1996)
- When Life Departs (1997) Short film, Academy Award nominee
- The Fearless Four (1997)
- Quest for Camelot (1998)
- The Iron Giant (1999)
- Help! I'm a Fish (2000) (U.S. title: A Fish Tale)
- Eight Crazy Nights (2002)
- Asterix and the Vikings (2006)
- How to Hook Up Your Home Theater (2007)
- Miffy the Movie (2013)
- Hocus Pocus Alfie Atkins (2013)

=== Computer animated films ===
- Terkel in Trouble (2004)
- The Ugly Duckling and Me (2006)
- Jungledyret Hugo: Fræk, flabet og fri (2007) (U.S. title: Amazon Jack)
- Niko and the Way to the Stars (2008) (U.S. title: The Flight Before Christmas)
- Journey to Saturn (2008)
- The Olsen Gang Gets Polished – Olsen Banden paa de Bonede Gulve (2010)
- Little Brother, Big Trouble: A Christmas Adventure – Niko 2 (2012)
- The Olsen Gang in Deep Trouble – Olsen Banden paa Dybt Vand (2013)
- Albert – (2015)
- The Incredible Story of the Giant Pear (2017)
- The Little Vampire 3D (2017)
- Ole Lund Kirkegaards Up and Away (2018)
- Checkered Ninja (2018)
- Raggie (2020)
- Checkered Ninja 2 (2021)
- Panda Bear in Africa (2024)

=== Television series ===
- Benjamin Blümchen (1988–2002)
- Rasmus Klump (1997–1999)
- Mumble Bumble (1998–2000)
- Troll Tales (2000–2002)
- Jungledyret Hugo (2001–2004)
- Little Wolf (2002)
- The Fairytaler (2002–2004)
- The Ugly Duckling and Me! (2005–2006)
- Alfie Atkins (2011–2013)
