= Up and Away (film) =

2018 Icelandic animated film

- Theatrical release poster
- Danish: Hodja fra Pjort
- Directed by: Karsten Kiilerich
- Produced by: Kim Magnusson; Tivi Magnusson; Anders Mastrup
- Edited by: Hans Perk
- Music by: Halfdan E Sebastian
- Production companies: M&M Productions; A. Film Production
- Distributed by: Mis. Label; United International Pictures
- Release date: 8 February 2018
- Running time: 81 minutes
- Country: Denmark
- Language: Danish
- Box office: $1,230,407

Up and Away (Danish: Hodja fra Pjort, lit. 'Hodja from Pjort') is a 2018 Danish animated fantasy adventure film written and directed by Karsten Kiilerich, based on the children's book of the same name by Danish writer Ole Lund Kirkegaard.

== Premise ==
Young boy Hodja lives in the small town of Pjort, but dreams of traveling the world. So – against his father's wishes – Hodja makes a deal with his neighbour that lets him borrow his flying carpet on the condition that Hodja will try to find the man's granddaughter, Diamond.

== Cast ==
- Thure Lindhardt as Hodja
- Özlem Saglanmak as Smaragd
- Peter Zhelder as Rotten
- Kurt Ravn as El Faza
- Peter Frödin as Sultan
- Raaberg as Mor Birgitte
- Lars Ranthe as Far
- Rebecca Rønde Kiilerich as Perlesten
- Jens Jacob Tychsen as Grumme
- Troells Toya as Salep
- Erik Holmey and Michael Zuckow Mardorf as Vagt
- Vibeke Duehol as the Sultan's favourite wife

== Release ==
The film was released in Denmark on 2 February 2018, where it received 164,273 admissions in Danish cinemas. It grossed $1,230,407 worldwide.
