= Frog & Friends =

Dutch animated television series

- Based on: The work of Max Velthuijs
- Country of origin: Netherlands
- No. of episodes: 26

Production
- Producer: Telescreen
- Running time: 7 minutes

Original release
- Network: KRO (Netherlands); ABC (Australia); TV2 (Denmark); YLE (Finland); WDR, KiKa (Germany); EBS (South Korea); NRK (Norway); SVT (Sweden); Thai PBS (Thailand)
- Release: 2009 – 2010

Frog & Friends (Kikker & Vriendjes) is a 2009-2010 Dutch animated TV series about Frog and his friends based on the work of Max Velthuijs. 26 episodes were produced.

== Synopsis ==
Frog is the hero of the show. He lives in a colourful landscape with his friends Pig, Hare, Duck and Rat. Their animated world reflects the same simple joys as Velthuijs' books.

The characters deal with elementary feelings such as love, fear, sadness, insecurity, happiness and more. These themes are materialized by simple and clear stories. Frog and his friends try to understand the feelings they encounter in both good and bad times.

== Characters ==
=== Main characters ===
- Frog is the main character. He is kind, honest, open and curious. He knows no inhibition and he is a true explorer.
- Duck is playful, pretty and cheerful. Well-meaning but a little unknowing. Duck can be caring and sweet and she can make Frog laugh the most. Frog and her are best friends and like each other.
- Pig is a kind of no-nonsense "Mother Earth", always busy working in the garden, picking apples and preparing food in the kitchen.
- Hare is the protector, the character who has a sense of responsibility. He might not say a lot but when he does, the others listen.
- Rat is a wonderful jack of all trades. He is a free-spirit, free-thinker, optimistic and carefree. Rat has travelled the world and his wisdom comes through this world-experience.

=== Secondary characters ===
- Little Bear is a bear that Frog found in the forest, he and Frog are best friends.
- Fox - He appears in Frog and the hungry fox, he wants to eat Duck.

== Cast ==
- Frog: Jamai Loman/Grant George
- Pig: Lotte Lohr/Sara Sidoh
- Rat: Levi van Kempen/Richard Cansino
- Hare: Rop Verheijen/Kirk Thornton
- Duck: Daphne Groot/Dorothy Elias-Fahn
- Little Bear: Machiel Verbeek/Michael Forset
- Narrator: Sander de Heer/Unknown

== Episode titles ==
1. Frog in Love
2. Frog Sleeps Over
3. Frog and the Stranger
4. Frog and the Birdsong
5. Frog Plays Hide-and-Seek
6. Frog Finds a Friend
7. Frog and the Snowman
8. Frog is Sad
9. Frog is Impatient
10. Frog and the Wide World
11. Frog and the Hot Day
12. Frog and the Treasure
13. Frog in Winter
14. Frog Plays Musical Chairs
15. Frog is Frog
16. Frog is Quiet
17. Frog is Mad
18. Frog is Frightened
19. Frog is Bored
20. Frog is a Hero
21. Frog and the New Year
22. Frog and a Very Special Day
23. Frog and the Hungry Fox
24. Frog and the Water
25. Frog's Birthday Game
26. Frog and the Wind

== DVD Releases ==
In Australia, Magna Home Entertainment have released the following Frog & Friends DVD's:

- 05/05/10 - Friendship: 6 Episodes
- 05/05/10 - Games & Adventures: 7 Episodes
- 29/09/10 - Feelings & Emotions: 7 Episodes
- 01/12/10 - Nature: 6 Episodes

== International broadcast ==
- Korean: EBS
