= Engel Reinhoudt =

Dutch singer and dialect writer (1946–2020)

- Born: 26 January 1946; Wolphaartsdijk
- Died: 11 July 2020 (aged 74)
- Other name: de Zeêuwse Bard
- Occupations: singer and dialect writer
- Awards: Goessche Diep Fondsprijs 2019

Engel Reinhoudt (26 January 1946 – 11 July 2020) was a Dutch musician and dialect writer. His nickname was 'de Zeêuwse Bard'.

Reinhoudt was born in Wolphaartsdijk and later lived in ’s-Heerenhoek. Reinhoudt was best known for composing and singing songs in Zeelandic. His best known song is “ Een bolus bie de koffie” (Coffee with a bolus). He also wrote in a sub-Zeelandic dialect Zuid-Bevelands. Reinhoudt did furthermore many more things to keep the dialect of Zeeland alive. Reinhoudt published stories and poems and translated children's books. Among others he translated books of Miffy and Disney's Pete. He wrote a weekly column for the regional newspaper PZC. He also had side projects involving the revitalization of local churches, such as the one in Ellewoudtsdijk that he helped promote nationally.

For his works, Reinhoudt was awarded in 2019 the “Goessche Diep Fondsprijs”; a prize awarded annually by the Zeeland department of the Prins Bernhard Cultuurfonds.

After a period of illness, Reinhoudt died at home on 11 July 2020 at the age of 74.
