= Miffy =

Fictional rabbit in books by Dick Bruna

Miffy (nijntje)
- Miffy
- First appearance: 21 June 1955; 71 years ago
- Created by: Dick Bruna
- Voiced by: Tessa Van Breugel (Dick Bruna's Miffy Storybook Classics; Dutch); Tanneke Hartzuiker (Miffy and Friends; Dutch); Eva Poppink (Miffy the Movie; Dutch); Échica Florijn (Miffy's Adventures Big and Small; Dutch); Unknown (Dick Bruna's Miffy Storybook Classics; US English); Jennie Ames (Dick Bruna's Miffy Storybook Classics; UK English); Emma Taylor Isherwood (Miffy: Colors, Numbers, and Shapes; English); Karin Hollreiser (Miffy and Friends; UK/Australia/New Zealand); Cyd Vandenburg (Miffy and Friends; US/Canada); Sandra Agababyan (Miffy the Movie; English); Sophie Goldstein (Miffy's Adventures Big and Small; English)

In-universe information
- Species: Rabbit
- Gender: Female

Miffy (Dutch: nijntje, pronounced [ˈnɛiɲtɕə] nayn-chə) is a fictional rabbit appearing in a series of picture books drawn and written by Dutch artist Dick Bruna. The original Dutch name, nijntje, written in lowercase, is a shortening of the diminutive konijntje, "little rabbit" because Dick Bruna's son was not able to pronounce konijntje.

The first Miffy book was published in 1955. More than thirty others have followed, selling over 100 million copies total. The character has also appeared in four television series: Dick Bruna's Miffy Storybook Classics from 1992; Miffy: Colors, Numbers, and Shapes from 1996; Miffy and Friends from 2003; and Miffy's Adventures Big and Small from 2015. On 30 January 2013 the feature-length film Miffy the Movie was released with Eva Poppink in the title role.

Miffy appears in a range of merchandise, including clothes and toys. The character has sometimes been confused with Hello Kitty. In 2011, following accusations of trademark and copyright infringement, Sanrio agreed to stop producing a Hello Kitty companion character named Cathy. The legal fees were donated to charity.

== Creation and design ==
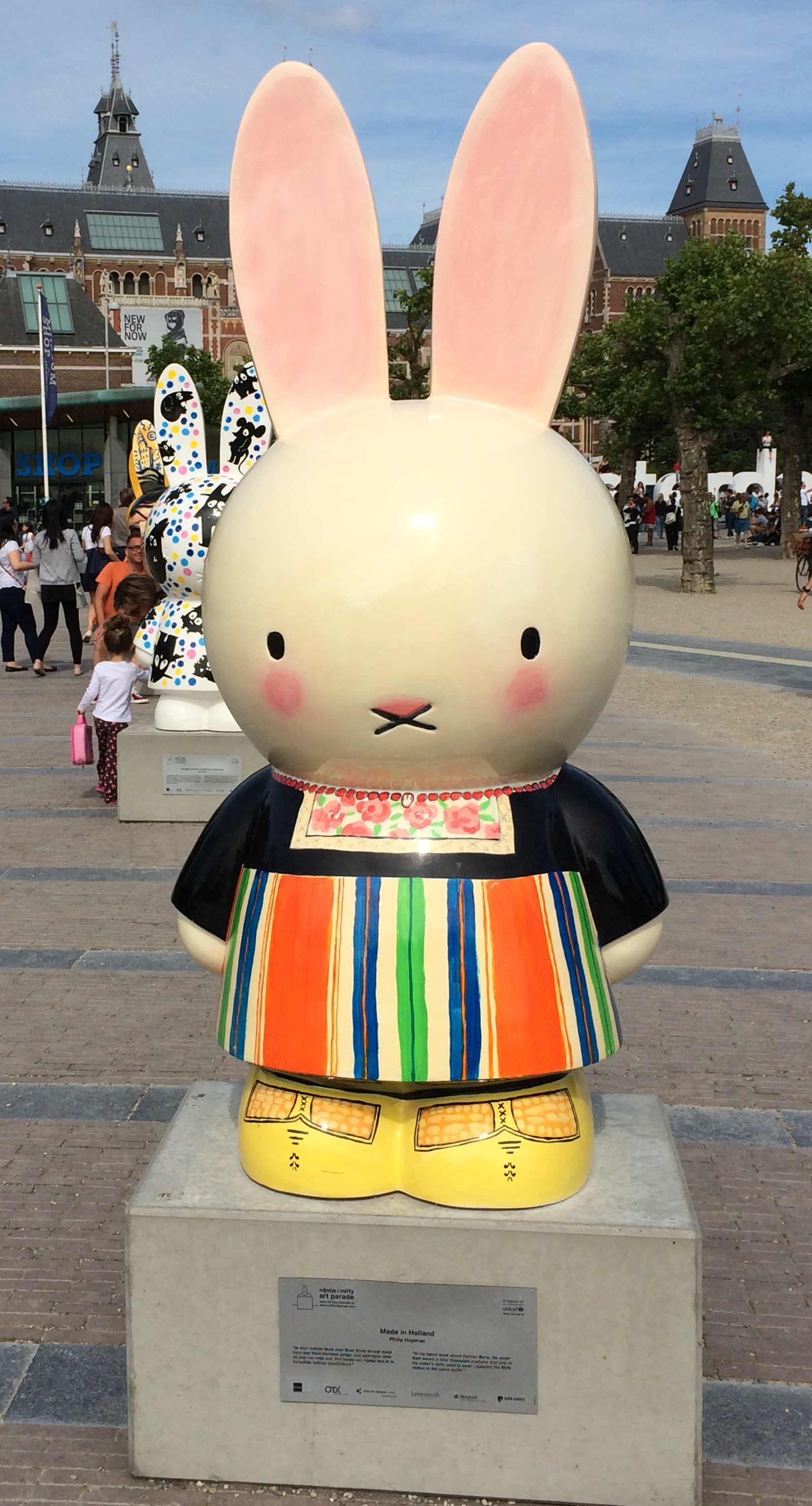
A sculpture of Miffy in Amsterdam

Miffy was created in 1955 after Bruna had been telling his one-year-old son, Sierk, stories about a little rabbit they had seen earlier in the dunes, while on holiday at Egmond aan Zee. Miffy became female in 1970 after Bruna decided that he wanted to draw a dress and not trousers on his rabbit.

At first Miffy looked like a toy animal with floppy ears, but by 1963, her design was changed to her current incarnation, a stylised form of a rabbit. Miffy is drawn in a graphic style, with minimalist black graphic lines. Bruna chose to only use black, white, red, yellow, blue, green, orange, brown, and grey. It is his use of primary colours that makes Miffy instantly recognisable, and also popular with preschoolers, because of her bright and intense simplistic colours.

Miffy's simple design reflects Bruna's philosophy of clear and direct storytelling. The design has remained consistent through the decades and has become characteristic of the Miffy style.

== Books ==
More than thirty titles starring Miffy have been published, along with many more featuring the series' other characters. Bruna has produced a total of 124 picture books for children. The Miffy books each contain twelve pages of story. Each page has one illustration and four lines of verse, with the last word of the second line rhyming with the last of the fourth. The plots, such as going to the hospital and going to school, are meant to be relatable to children and they always have a happy ending. Some books have no text at all, such as Miffy's Dream, Through The Year with Boris Bear, and Another Story to Tell.

The books are printed in small format. Bruna considers it important that his audience feels that his books are there for them, not for their parents. Most Miffy books have an advisory reading level of ages four to eight.

Bruna's books have been translated into more than 50 different languages, and over 85 million copies have been sold all over the world. They have also been translated into regional dialects, including in Zeelandic by Engel Reinhoudt. Dick Bruna has won many awards for his books, such as the Golden Brush in 1990, for Boris Bear and the Silver Brush for Miffy In The Tent in 1996. In 1997, he was awarded the Silver Slate for Dear Grandma Bunny, a book in which Miffy's grandmother got sick and died.

The other characters that appear in the books are her family: Miffy's parents, who first appears in Miffy, her Grandma and Grandpa, who first appears in Miffy's Birthday, her Auntie Alice who first appears in Miffy's Bicycle, and her Uncle Bob, who first appears in Miffy Goes Flying. A new brother for Miffy is introduced in Miffy And The New Baby.

She also has many friends: Boris Bear, who first appeared in Through the year with Boris Bear (1986) and Barbara Bear, who first appeared in Boris and Barbara (1989) and is Boris's girlfriend; Poppy Pig and her niece Grunty, both first appeared in 1977; Snuffy the dog, who first appeared in 1969; Ko the Koala, who first appeared in 2005; Donna Donkey, who first appeared in 1998; Farmer John, who first appeared in Farmer John (1982), and other bunnies such as Aggie, Winnie (both first appeared in 1970), Dan (first appeared in 2006), and Melanie (first appeared in 1979).

== Television ==
Miffy appeared in her first TV show in 1992, called Dick Bruna's Miffy Storybook Classics: The Original Series. Directed by veteran animator Gene Deitch, each episode was traditionally animated and ran for approximately five minutes. The show aired in the Netherlands on KRO, in the United Kingdom on ITV, in Canada on TVOntario and CBC Television, in Australia on ABC, and in the USA on Cartoon Network's Small World block with VHS releases from Geneon USA as well as BMG Video UK, episodes of the show were later included as Bonus Features on Miffy and Friends DVDs.

From 2003 to 2007, Miffy and Friends aired on children's television channels such as Treehouse in Canada, and Noggin in the USA. The show added several new characters, such as Melanie's African family and the family of Boris' and Barbara's common cousin, Umik. The series was produced by Pedri Animation BV, a Dutch stop-motion animation company. It was voiced simply by a feminine storytelling narrator. Miffy's Adventures Big and Small premiered 2 October 2015. It currently has a total of six seasons. It airs on the Nick Jr. Channel in the USA.

In October 2023, a new series was announced. It premiered in 2025 on Canal+ in France. It was produced by StudioCanal, Mercis and Superprod Animation. The series also introduces Miffy's younger brother, Bun.

== Conflicts with Sanrio ==
Miffy is sometimes assumed to be a Japanese character as many of Sanrio's characters, particularly Hello Kitty, introduced in 1974, are drawn in a similar style. The Miffy brand is popular in Japan, with strong sales of Japanese-made Miffy merchandise. In an interview for The Daily Telegraph, Bruna openly expressed his dislike for Hello Kitty. "That ... is a copy [of Miffy], I think. I don't like that at all. I always think, 'No, don't do that. Try to make something that you think of yourself.'" In 1999, Miffy was the ninth top-selling character in Japan, where licensed merchandise sold over ¥37.59 billion ($330 million).

On 26 August 2010, Mercis BV, representing Bruna, brought suit against Sanrio with the claim that one of Hello Kitty's companion characters, a rabbit named Cathy, infringed on the copyright and trademark of Miffy. On 2 November 2010, a Dutch court ruled against Sanrio and ordered the company to stop marketing Cathy products in Belgium, Luxembourg, and the Netherlands. On 7 June 2011, following the Tōhoku earthquake and tsunami in Japan, Sanrio and Mercis reached an out-of-court settlement requiring Sanrio to halt production worldwide of merchandise that features Cathy. Instead of continuing the court battle, the two companies announced that they would donate the legal fees to help the earthquake victims.

== Legacy ==
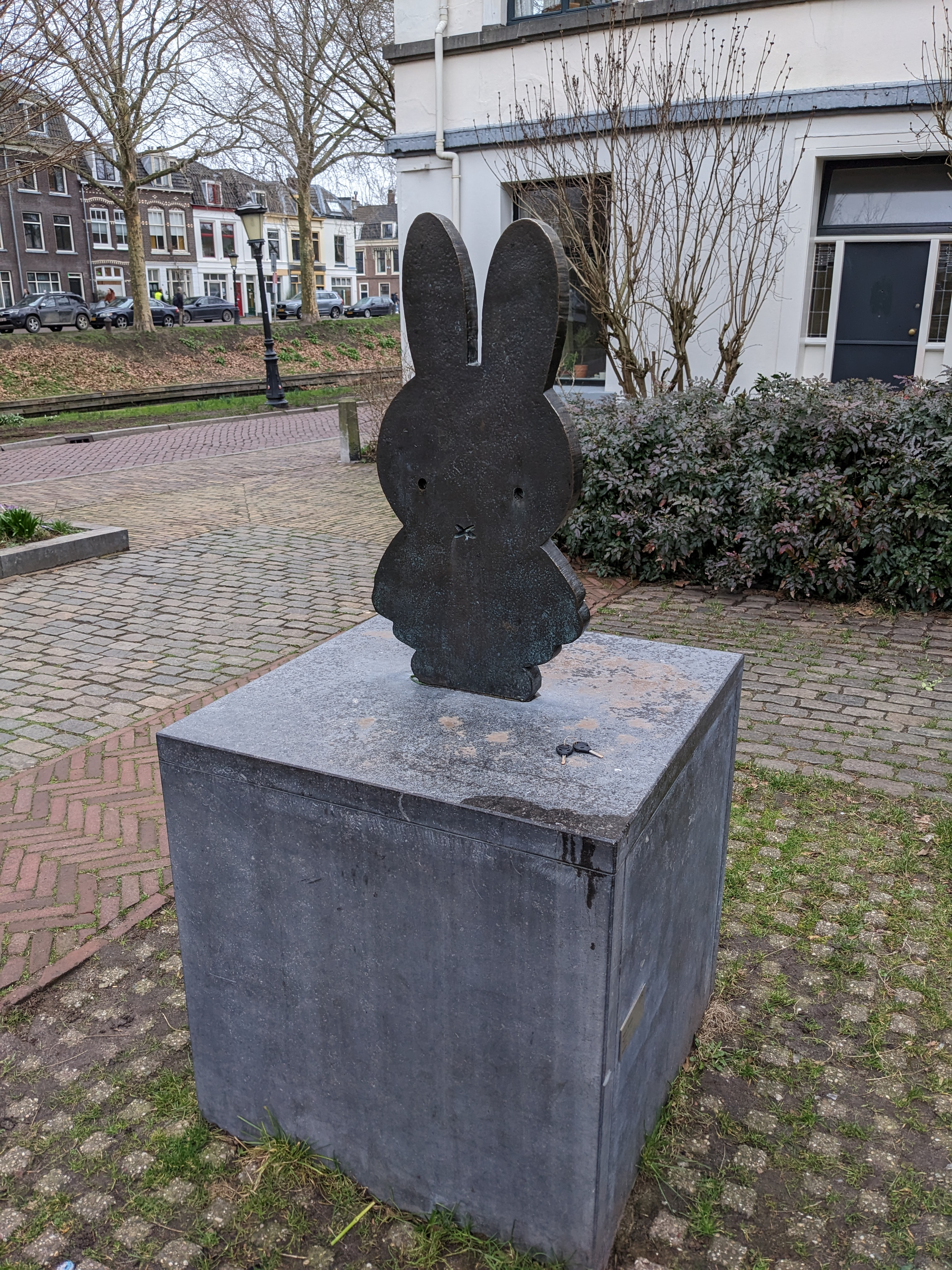
Miffy statue at the Nijntjepleintje ("Little Nijntje Square") in Utrecht, the Netherlands.

In the early 1990s, an image of Miffy holding an adjustable spanner coyly behind her back appeared on flyers produced by people taking direct action against the UK government's road building program. This unauthorised use of the character spread and Miffy became a mascot for groups involved in radical ecological direct action.

In Bruna's hometown, Utrecht, a square was named after Miffy (Nijntje), the Nijntjepleintje (lit: Little Miffy Square, the diminutive for square in Dutch: pleintje retains the rhyme with nijntje as the ij and ei digraphs are pronounced identically: Dutch pronunciation: [ɛi]). In 2006, the Centraal Museum opened a permanent exhibition, the dick bruna huis (Dick Bruna house). Bruna distributed all Miffy DVDs alongside Warner Home Video. In 2015, Bridge Entertainment acquired the distribution rights to Bruna's home videos.

Miffy celebrated her 50th birthday in 2005. This was marked in cities across the globe, for example, at the Manchester Art Gallery in the United Kingdom. She also serves as a "celebrity character spokesperson" for UNICEF.

Miffy's namesakes include a new species of booklouse from Peru. The insect was given the scientific name Trichadenotecnum miffy in 2008, because its epiproct, an appendage on its abdomen, resembles a small rabbit.

Miffy currently has six bakehouses and four flower shops in Japan. The bakehouses are located in the prefectures of Hokkaido, Saitama, Okayama, Nagano, Oita, and Kyoto. The flower shops are located in Ikebukuro, Asakusa, Osaka, and Hidenincho.

In July 2014, Bruna announced his retirement; the rights to the Miffy character were not sold. On 16 February 2017, Dick Bruna died at the age of 89.

In 2021, Miffy collaborated with Converse to create a capsule menswear collection in the Netherlands to celebrate the creator of Miffy, Dick Bruna. In December 2022, Tommy Hilfiger announced its new collection with Miffy as the main attraction for the new partnership in celebration of the Lunar New Year of the Rabbit.

In the early 2020s, Miffy's popularity grew, particularly amongst young adults in North America. The resurgence was driven in part by social media, nostalgia, and increased interest in childhood characters among Gen Z consumers. Collaborations with fashion and lifestyle brands, including Mulberry, Uniqlo, and Urban Outfitters, helped introduce Miffy to new audiences and further increase its popularity. In 2022, American sales of Miffy merchandise increased by 435%.

== See also ==
- Musti
