= Pappy's Puppy =

- Directed by: Friz Freleng
- Story by: Warren Foster
- Starring: Mel Blanc
- Music by: Carl Stalling
- Animation by: Gerry Chiniquy
- Layouts by: Hawley Pratt
- Backgrounds by: Irv Wyner
- Color process: Technicolor
- Production company: Warner Bros. Cartoons
- Distributed by: Warner Bros. Pictures
- Release date: December 17, 1955
- Running time: 7 minutes
- Language: English

Pappy's Puppy is a 1955 Warner Bros. Merrie Melodies cartoon short directed by Friz Freleng. The short was released on December 17, 1955, and stars Sylvester the Cat. Mel Blanc provides all of the vocal characterizations; however, aside from whistling, Sylvester does not speak in this short. Gerry Chiniquy served as the animator.

== Plot ==
At a hospital, Butch the bulldog paces nervously, waiting for his baby to be born. When the baby is born and he is told it is a boy, Butch happily faints. Back at home, Butch teaches his new son how to walk, act tough, and bite cats. One day, the young bulldog is playing with a ball when he comes upon Sylvester. His training kicks in and he attacks Sylvester, who proceeds to place the small bulldog under a tin can. However, Butch catches Sylvester and exacts revenge by taking Sylvester to a shed and hammering the tin can on his head.

Later, Sylvester is walking along while the baby bulldog is biting at his tail. He slaps the bulldog off camera, only for Butch to catch up with him and hit Sylvester. After that, Sylvester reluctantly plays fetch with the baby bulldog, but decides to throw the stick into a busy street, hoping the bulldog will be flattened. However, the young bulldog retrieves it successfully. Annoyed, Sylvester prepares to throw it again but Butch sees this and throws the stick into traffic himself, pointing for Sylvester to fetch the stick this time. Sylvester successfully retrieves it amidst heavy traffic, but is run over by a man on a scooter on the sidewalk.

Once again, Sylvester plays fetch with the young bulldog and throws a ball into a doghouse, which Sylvester boards up when the bulldog chases the ball into it. Sylvester plans to drop an already lit stick of dynamite into the open hole on the top. However, Butch once again catches Sylvester and places the doghouse over Sylvester instead, nailing the hole shut with a board. Sylvester does not hammer out the nails in the board in time, as the dynamite explodes. In the final set piece of the cartoon, Sylvester sets up a booby trap consisting of a dog bone hooked up to a shotgun.

When Butch's son begins to tug on the bone, Butch gives Sylvester a stern look, prompting Sylvester to run over and plug the shotgun hole with his finger so the young bulldog is unharmed, resulting in Sylvester being shot repeatedly in the finger and face. The stork arrives and announces Butch will have more puppies. The cartoon ends as Sylvester, finally having had enough of the bulldog puppies and Butch's abuse, chases the stork and shoots at him.

== See also ==
- List of American films of 1955
