= The Ugly Duckling and Me! =

- Danish theatrical release poster
- Directed by: Michael Hegner; Karsten Kiilerich
- Written by: Mark Hodkinson; Karsten Kiilerich; Michael Hegner
- Based on: The Ugly Duckling by Hans Christian Andersen
- Edited by: Thorbjørn Christoffersen; Virgil Kastrup; Per Risager
- Music by: Jacob Groth
- Production companies: A. Film A/S; Magma Films; TV2 Denmark; Futurikon
- Distributed by: Nordisk Film (Scandinavia); Eclipse Pictures (Ireland); Warner Bros. Pictures (Germany) (Note: Distributed under the Warner Bros. Family Entertainment label.); SND Films; Gébéka Films (France)
- Release dates: 8 September 2006 (TIFF); 6 October 2006 (Denmark); 21 December 2006 (Germany); 14 February 2007 (France); 6 July 2007 (Ireland)
- Running time: 89 minutes
- Countries: Denmark; Ireland; Germany; France
- Languages: Danish; English; French; German

The Ugly Duckling and Me! is a 2006 animated comedy drama film directed by Michael Hegner and Karsten Kiilerich. Intended for a family audience, it is a modern adaptation of the 1843 fairy tale "The Ugly Duckling" by Hans Christian Andersen. The Yorkshire Post described it as a "feel-good" film for family audiences. The film follows a rat named Ratso who strives to become a famous showman. His life changes when an egg falls out of its nest, revealing an ugly duckling with bushy grey wings, and he is forced to become a father. It also won an award at the China International Cartoon and Digital Art Festival. The film initially premiered in Denmark on 6 April 2006.

== Plot ==
Ratso, a success-starved city rat impresario, dreams of becoming a famous showman, despite his terrible shows. His assistant is a worm named Wesley, whom he passes off as the "longest worm in the world" by sticking him through a straw. Ratso plans to drag Wesley, despite his protests, to a “carnival” where his pen-pal cousin Ernie boasts of hosting the most celebrated shows in the animal world. Phillis and her two brothers chase them, and Ratso is on the run from them.

After riding on a train, the two tumble into a bird’s nest just as an egg begins to hatch, knocking them out. Wesley ends up trapped inside a tequila bottle, while Ratso lands in a yard full of chickens and ducks, still holding the egg. Accused of theft, Ratso claims ownership, stating his “wife” was a yard duck, with Daphne backing him. An egg hatches into a strange bird, which sees Ratso as its parent. Stuck in the duck yard, Ratso digs a tunnel to escape but decides to take Ugly, who provides a distraction, instead of ditching him. Meanwhile, Wesley reveals Ratso’s destination to Philis and her brothers.

Following a map to Ernie’s carnival, Ratso and Ugly make their way through the woods. After Ratso helps Ugly practice his dance moves, they run into a fox repulsed by Ugly. They rescue a goose named Jessie from the fox and spend the night in an abandoned Volkswagen Beetle. By morning, Ugly has suddenly grown into a teenager. He argues with Ratso, and Jessie joins them, instantly catching Ugly’s eye. Trying to cross a frozen river, Ratso ignores a nearby bridge and is attacked by a pike, prompting Ugly to save him. When the pike sees Ugly, it spits them out safely on the other side.

As they continue, Ugly dances for Jessie, but her unintended laughter makes Ugly push her away. Jessie discovers Ratso’s true motives and makes an unsuccessful attempt to stop him from publicly humiliating Ugly on stage. When they arrive at the carnival—an abandoned amusement park populated by gulls—they are ambushed by Phillis and her brothers, then attacked by a tabby cat, revealed to be Ernie, who’s carrying a living hand puppet named William. Seeing Ratso is now under Ernie's protection, Phillis schemes to draw him out.

Just before the show, Ratso hesitates, but Ugly goes onstage to support him. The crowd laughs at Ugly, making him think Ratso set him up. Heartbroken, Ugly leaves for Jessie. Philis captures Ugly and tells Ratso to come to the duck-yard. Ratso, Jessie, Ernie, and William try to rescue him but get caught. In captivity, Ugly forgives Ratso, who admits he’s not his father. They share a heartfelt embrace, with Ugly still seeing Ratso as a father figure.

The next day, Ratso is brought to Phillis. Fearing for his life, Ugly suddenly transforms into an adult swan, escapes, freeing Phillis’ captives. Phillis pressures Ratso to marry her as he’s the last single rat in the city. When she finds out Ratso adopted Ugly, she slaps him, causing Ugly to throw her into the wedding cake. Ratso wakes up in Daphne’s arms as a flock of swans invites Ugly to join their migration. Despite his admiration for them, Ugly returns to his adopted family, realizing love matters more than appearances. Ratso then allows Ugly to propose to Jessie, and the wedding continues.

== Voice cast ==
- Morgan C. Jones as Ratso, Frank
- Paul Tylak as Wesley
- Anna Nugent as Phyllis (credited as Anna Olson)
- Gary Hetzler as Stan
- Danna Davis as various duck-yard chickens
- Barbara Bergin as Esmeralda
- Michelle Read as Peep Olga
- Hilary Cahill as Daphne
- Justin Gregg as Ugly
  - Kim Larney as baby Ugly
- Hillary Kavanagh as Pox
- Laurann Rabbitt as Lou
- Aoife Murray as Emmy
- Liz Lloyd as Fox, Swan #2
- Aileen Mythen as Jessie
- Drew Lucas as Ernie
- Hope Brown as William
- Rod Goodall as Preacher
- Patrick FitzSymons as Swan #1 (credited as Patrick Fitzsymons)
- Max Hafler as Swan #3

== TV series ==
The same year, there was a TV series based on the movie. It takes place during Ratso and baby Ugly's stay in the duckyard.

=== The TV series' voice cast ===
- Patrick Van Wagenen – Ugly/Lou/Chick Bully #3
- Christiana Anbri – Egg
- Lloyd Floyd – Ratso
- Emma Weaver – Hen
- Aileen Mythen – Chick Bully #1
- Gracie Sisto – Daphne
- Gabriella Malek – Emmy
- Becca Lish – Brown Hen #1

== Release ==
The film had its world premiere at the Toronto International Film Festival on 8 September 2006. The film was released in Denmark on 6 October 2006, in Germany on 21 December, in France on 14 February 2007, and in Ireland on 6 July 2007.
