= The Incredible Story of the Giant Pear =

2017 Danish animated film

- Theatrical release poster
- Danish: Den utrolige historie om den kæmpestore pære
- Directed by: Amalie Næsby Fick; Jørgen Lerdam; Philip Einstein Lipski
- Based on: The Incredible Story of the Giant Pear by Jakob Martin Strid
- Edited by: Hans Perk
- Production companies: A. Film; Einstein Film; Nordisk Film Production
- Distributed by: Nordisk Film
- Release date: 12 October 2017
- Running time: 78 minutes
- Country: Denmark
- Language: Danish
- Box office: $3 million

The Incredible Story of the Giant Pear (Danish: Den utrolige historie om den kæmpestore pære) is a 2017 Danish animated film directed by Amalie Næsby Fick, Jørgen Lerdam and Philip Einstein Lipski, based on the book of the same name by Jakob Martin Strid. The film was nominated for four Robert Awards, including Best Danish Film, but won Best Children's Film and Best Adapted Screenplay.

== Plot ==
Jeremiah Severin Bartholomew Olsen, or simply JB, is the mayor of a town named Sunnytown, where the sun shines, hence the name. JB's friends are Mitcho, a cat, and Sebastian, an elephant. Mr. Twig is the town's vice mayor, who always wishes to build a town hall. One day, while playing a game of Yahtzee, JB suddenly remembers about Twig's town hall, and leaves to get him, but he goes missing. With JB missing, Twig assumes control of Sunnytown, and builds his town hall, blocking the sun.

One day, Mitcho and Sebastian discover a message in a bottle, revealing that JB ended up on a mysterious island. Included with the letter is a small seed, which the pair plant in their garden. That night, Sebastian recounts to Mitcho that his late grandfather saw the island when he was young, but the island vanished, and his grandfather spent his entire life finding the island but never returned home.

The next morning, the seed grows into a giant pear. Professor Glykose, a scientist, arrives, and transforms the pear into a new home. The group then embark on a journey to rescue JB after Twig accidentally knocks the pear into the water. En route, they encounter a group of pirates, who they warn about the mysterious island.

After stealing batteries from the pirates, the group return to the pear, and power and use a magnotube compass to discover Twig's plan to fire a tank at the opening of the town hall. They are visited by Ulysses Karlsen, who take them to a library in his ship. There, Karlsen presents a stone found from the island to the group, explaining that it was a gift from Sebastian's late grandfather. Karlsen tries to eject the pear from his ship, but Glykose knocks the ship's power out before Karlsen can do so. Mitcho and Sebastian acquire the stone, and the group escape with the pear. They insert the stone into their compass, revealing JB's location.

After braving a pitch black sea filled with souls of the deceased, the group eventually reach the island, where they reconcile with JB, who recalls that he accidentally fell into a dinghy while trying to meet with Twig, and ended up on the island. Mitcho and Sebastian realize that their pear home has been destroyed upon arrival, and the latter feels awful for what is happening to Sunnytown. That night, the two discover a engine room underneath the island, revealing that it is drivable all along. The group returns to Sunnytown, with the pirates and Karlsen joining them.

The group find that the opening of the town hall is starting already. Sebastian decides to alert Twig by sending him a message in a bottle announcing JB's status, launching it through an air pipe system. Upon reading the message, an enraged Twig fires the tank that sinks the island, but the group escape unharmed. A giant pear breaks through the town hall, revealing the sun again. Sebastian nearly drowns, but Mitcho saves his life before returning to the town. The town celebrate JB's return, and Twig's town hall is replaced with a new pear-shaped town hall.

== Voice cast ==
- Alfred Bjerre Larsen as Sebastian
- Liva Elvira Magnussen as Mitcho
- Peter Frödin as Professor Glykose
- Henrik Koefoed as Borgmester JB
- Peter Plaugborg as Viceborgmester Kvist
- Søren Pilmark as Ulysses Karlsen
- Jakob Oftebro as Piratkaptajnen
- Peter Zhelder as Bodegapiraten
- Bjarne Henriksen as Oldefar
- Peter Aude as Oberst Rekyl

== Release ==
The Incredible Story of the Giant Pear was released theatrically in Denmark on 12 October 2017, and became the fourth most viewed Danish film of 2017 with 216,645 admissions. Elsewhere, it grossed a worldwide total of $3,099,852. Outside of Denmark, the top earning countries were Norway ($1,394,046), South Korea ($680,016) and France ($549,898).

=== Reception ===
The film received generally positive reviews from critics, and in Denmark it received several accolades and nominations.
