= Raggie =

2020 Animated film

- Estonian: Sipsik
- Danish: Ida og Pjalte
- Directed by: Meelis Arulepp; Karsten Kiilerich
- Screenplay by: Karsten Kiilerich; Aina Järvine
- Produced by: Kristel Toldsepp; Anders Mastrup
- Music by: Ewert Sundja; Liina Sumera
- Production company: A. Film Production
- Distributed by: Copenhagen Bombay (Denmark)
- Release date: 19 February 2020 (Estonia)
- Running time: 74 minutes
- Countries: Estonia; Denmark
- Languages: Estonian; Danish
- Box office: €481,402 (Estonia)

Raggie (Estonian: Sipsik; Danish: Ida og Pjalte) is a 2020 animated fantasy film directed by Meelis Arulepp and Karsten Kiilerich, based on the 1962 children's book of the same name by Estonian children's author Eno Raud.

On 5 June 2026, the Bank of Estonia issued a special 2-euro coin dedicated to Raggie/Sipsik. The one million coins minted are valid throughout the Eurozone.

== Premise ==
When six-year-old Ruby's older brother Mark has to return to school after the summer holidays end, she befriends a magical doll which comes to life.

== Voice cast ==
=== Estonian voice cast ===
- Ott Sepp as Sipsik
- Jan Uuspõld as Rat Boy
- Merle Palmiste as Moon and woman in taxi
- Nikolai Bentsler as Taxi driver
- Ago Anderson as Father
- Hilje Murel as Mother
- Helene Vannari as Grandmother
- Piret Krumm as Kristel Adrienne
- Elo-Mirt Oja as Anu
- Eliise Mööl as Kaara
- Tobias Turk as Mattias
- Hugo Malmsten as Mart

=== Danish voice cast ===
- Jesper Asholt as Pjalte
- Ella Daisy Anthony-Collins as Ida
- Louis Næss-Schmidt as Mark
- Rebecca Rønde Kiilerich as Mor, Rottemor and Måne
- Tom Jensen as Far and Rottedreng
- Vigga Bro as Bedste
- Siff Ahrens as Mellanie, Vicky and Christel
- Malik Hansen Addington as Mathias
- Mia Lerdam as Fugl, Rottepige and woman in taxi
- Peter Zhelder as Taxachauffør and Rottefar

== Release ==
Raggie was released in Estonian cinemas on 19 February 2020, and made €481,402 from 107,496 admissions, making it the third highest-grossing film in Estonia of 2020.
