= Miffy and Friends =

Dutch stop-motion animated television series

- Genre: Animated television series
- Created by: Dick Bruna
- Directed by: Raymond Jafelice; Andrew Young
- Narrated by: Cyd Vandenberg (US/Canada); Karin Hollreiser (UK/Australia/New Zealand)
- Theme music composer: Tom van Beers
- Opening theme: Miffy Theme
- Composer: Jerry Hickman
- Country of origin: Netherlands
- Original languages: Dutch; English
- No. of seasons: 3
- No. of episodes: 39 (78 segments)

Production
- Running time: 24 minutes
- Production companies: Mercis Media; Palm Plus Multimedia

Original release
- Network: KRO
- Release: 3 February 2003 – 30 March 2005

Related
- Miffy's Adventures Big and Small

Miffy and Friends (Dutch: Nijntje en haar vriendjes) is a Dutch stop-motion animated television series, based on the Miffy book series by Dutch artist Dick Bruna. The series was co-produced by Mercis Media and Palm Plus Multimedia. The series was originally broadcast from 3 February 2003 to 30 March 2005 on KRO in the Netherlands.

== Plot ==
The show focuses on the life of a young rabbit Miffy. The show is presented in a storybook style, with narration by Canadian actress/singer Cyd Vandenberg explaining the actions of non-speaking Miffy and her friends.

== Characters ==
- Miffy is a young rabbit and the series' protagonist. She is an aspiring artist who also likes to write.
- Melanie is Miffy's best friend, she is brown rabbit from Africa and is originally introduced as Miffy's pen pal.
- Snuffy is a brave brown dog who was first introduced in the episode "Miffy Meets Snuffy". She is one of Miffy's best friends.
- Boris is a bear who lives near Miffy. He enjoys building things. He has a friend named Barbara.
- Poppy is a pig often seen gardening or reading. She has a niece named Grunty.
- Grunty is Poppy Pig's niece.
- Barbara is Boris Bear's friend.

== Episodes ==
The series lasted for three seasons, consisting of 39 episodes. Each episode is made up of two segments.

When the series aired on Noggin in the US, original math-based shorts appeared between the two segments.

Series	Episodes	Segments	Originally released	
Series	Episodes	Segments	First released	Last released
1	13	26	3 February 2003	11 August 2003
2	13	26	5 April 2004	14 May 2004
3	13	26	25 October 2004	30 March 2005

=== Season 1 (2003) ===
No.	Title	Original release date	Prod. code
1a	"Miffy’s Musical Day"	3 February 2003	101A
1b	"Miffy's Rainy Day"	10 February 2003	101B
2a	"Miffy Meets Snuffy"	17 February 2003	102A
2b	"Miffy's Gift from Boris"	24 February 2003	102B
3a	"Poppy Pig Lends a Hand"	4 March 2003	103A
3b	"Miffy's and Aggie's Teddy Bears"	11 March 2003	103B
4a	"Miffy at a Costume Party"	18 March 2003	104A
4b	"Miffy Goes Camping"	25 March 2003	104B
5a	"Snuffy's Birthday"	7 April 2003	105A
5b	"Miffy Has the Flu"	14 April 2003	105B
6a	"Miffy Finds the Cup"	21 April 2003	106A
6b	"Snuffy Learns Patience"	28 April 2003	106B
7a	"Miffy's Birthday Party"	12 May 2003	107A
7b	"Miffy's Dancing Lessons"	19 May 2003	107B
8a	"Miffy is Lost in the Woods"	26 May 2003	108A
8b	"Miffy and Poppy Pig Have Breakfast"	2 June 2003	108B
9a	"Miffy and the Little Bird"	9 June 2003	109A
9b	"Miffy Plays Hide and Seek"	16 June 2003	109B
10a	"Miffy and the Wall Paintings"	23 June 2003	110A
10b	"Miffy and the Blue Egg"	30 June 2003	110B
11a	"Miffy and the Snow Bunny"	7 July 2003	111A
11b	"Miffy Flies a Kite"	14 July 2003	111B
12a	"Miffy and Melanie Learn to Read"	21 July 2003	112A
12b	"Miffy Paints Her Room"	28 July 2003	112B
13a	"Boris's Bird House"	4 August 2003	113A
13b	"Miffy's Three Wishes"	11 August 2003	113B

=== Season 2 (2004) ===
No.	Title	Original release date	Prod. code
14a	"Miffy's Summer Vacation"	5 April 2004	114A
14b	"Miffy Gets a Postcard"	6 April 2004	114B
15a	"Miffy Meets Snuffy"	7 April 2004	115A
15b	"Miffy's Gift from Boris"	8 April 2004	115B
16a	"Miffy and the Caterpillar"	9 April 2004	116A
16b	"Miffy and the Great Carrot Feast"	12 April 2004	116B
17a	"Miffy's Colorful World"	13 April 2004	117A
17b	"Miffy's Scooter"	14 April 2004	117B
18a	"Miffy's Snowfall"	15 April 2004	118A
18b	"Miffy and Grunty Sleep in a Tent"	16 April 2004	118B
19a	"Miffy's Restaurant"	19 April 2004	119A
19b	"Miffy Discovers Nature"	20 April 2004	119B
20a	"Miffy and the Birthday Cake"	23 April 2004	120A
20b	"Miffy Counts Leaves"	24 April 2004	120B
21a	"Miffy in the Wind"	25 April 2004	121A
21b	"Miffy's Late for School"	26 April 2004	121B
22a	"Miffy Worries about Snuffy"	27 April 2004	122A
22b	"Miffy Helps Grunty"	28 April 2004	122B
23a	"Miffy Plants a Seed"	3 May 2004	123A
23b	"Snuffy's Doghouse"	4 May 2004	123B
24a	"Miffy Finds Snuffy"	5 May 2004	124A
24b	"Miffy and the Seasons"	6 May 2004	124B
25a	"Miffy Makes and Bakes"	11 May 2004	125A
25b	"Miffy's Surprise"	12 May 2004	125B
26a	"Miffy in the Shade"	13 May 2004	126A
26b	"Miffy's Flower Pot"	14 May 2004	126B

=== Season 3 (2004–2005) ===
No.	Title	Original release date	Prod. code
27a	"Miffy's Beach Picnic"	25 October 2004	201A
27b	"Boris Tidies Up!"	26 October 2004	201B
28a	"Miffy Wants to Fly"	27 October 2004	203A
28b	"Miffy's Teddy Bear is Sick"	28 October 2004	203B
29a	"Miffy's Ball Game"	29 October 2004	207B
29b	"Miffy Has an Unexpected Day"	1 November 2004	206B
30a	"Miffy's Apple Pie"	2 November 2004	205A
30b	"Miffy's Musical Soup"	3 November 2004	205B
31a	"Miffy and Snuffy at the Playground"	6 November 2004	202A
31b	"Miffy and the Hungry Bird"	7 November 2004	202B
32a	"Miffy's Lost Teddy Bear"	14 November 2004	204A
32b	"Miffy and the Great Summer Picnic"	15 November 2004	204B
33a	"Miffy and the Three Christmas Trees"	16 December 2004	206A
33b	"Miffy's Mystery"	8 March 2005	206B
34a	"Miffy and the Shadows"	11 March 2005	216A
34b	"Snuffy's Winter Fun"	12 March 2005	216B
35a	"Miffy Plays Doctor"	17 March 2005	213A
35b	"Miffy Goes Skiing"	18 March 2005	213B
36a	"Miffy's Family Car Trip"	19 March 2005	208A
36b	"Miffy and the Falling Leaves"	20 March 2005	208B
37a	"Miffy and Snuffy Hear a Strange Sound"	23 March 2005	211A
37b	"Miffy's Mother's Day Present"	24 March 2005	211B
38a	"Boris Forgets Something"	27 March 2005	212A
38b	"Miffy's Dance Show"	28 March 2005	212B
39a	"Miffy Counts the Trees"	29 March 2005	207A
39b	"Boris's Race"	30 March 2005	207B

== Production ==
The series was produced in the Netherlands by Big Tent Entertainment and Mercis BV in association with Palm Multimedia.

== Broadcast ==
The series premiered in the Netherlands on KRO in 2003.

In the United States, the show was licensed by Big Tent Entertainment and aired on Noggin from April 7, 2003, to July 20, 2008. For the US airings, Noggin created original "interactive game" shorts to air between segments. In 2015, Noggin was relaunched as a streaming app; Miffy and Friends was added to the app on October 3, 2016.

From 2007, the series was broadcast on local PBS stations, presented by WLIW.

It also aired on Treehouse TV in Canada, ABC Kids in Australia and on TV3 in New Zealand.

== Home media ==
During its run, several videotapes including episodes of the series were produced. The series was also made available on DVD in America through Sony Wonder and Big Tent Entertainment. Select Miffy and Friends episodes were included on themed DVDs released in 2009.

As of 2024, Miffy and Friends is available to stream on Amazon Prime.

== Franchise ==
=== Sequel ===
In 2015, a continuation of the series, Miffy's Adventures Big and Small, premiered on NPO Zappelin in the Netherlands and on Tiny Pop in the UK; it concluded on 15 June 2019.

=== Reboot ===
In 2025, the series was rebooted.
