= Antón Cancelas =

Spanish voice actor and broadcaster (1955–2021)

Antón Cancelas Padín (1955 – 9 January 2021) was a Spanish voice actor and broadcaster.

== Biography ==
Cancelas began working in the field of dubbing in 1986. He was the voice of the character of J. R. Ewing in the American series Dallas in one of his first best known works. He used both Spanish and Galician to give voice to renowned Hollywood actors in many films that have gone down in film history. In 2014, he opened his own recording, voiceover and dubbing studio, which he ran until his death.

During his career, Cancelas voiced actors such as Clint Eastwood in Dirty Harry or The Iron Sergeant, Jack Nicholson, Anthony Hopkins, and Walter Matthau, among others.

In the 1993 film The Fugitive, he dubbed the commissioner of the United States Marshals Service, Samuel "Big Dog" Gerard, played by Tommy Lee Jones. For that role, Jones received the Academy Award for Best Supporting Actor.

He played Arnold Schwarzenegger in Terminator 2: Judgment Day in its Galician version, where he pronounced "a rañala, raparigo" ("Hasta la vista, baby"), which was chosen as the best phrase in the history of the dubbing of Galicia Television by popular vote. The normalization of the use of Galician in the audiovisual world and its acceptance among the population have been closely related to the participation of Cancelas giving his voice to popular television and film characters in recent decades.

Within the world of animation, he participated in the dubbing of the anime series The Knights of the Zodiac. He also worked on series like Cool Kids, Warrior, and Your Pretty Face is Going to Hell. His last works were for HBO and Fox productions.

Cancelas also dubbed documentaries and advertising campaigns, both for companies (such as the Estrella Galicia beer brand) and for institutions such as Abanca, the National Organization of the Spanish Blind (ONCE) or the Junta de Galicia.
