= When Life Departs =

1997 film by Stefan Fjeldmark and Karsten Kiilerich

- Directed by: Stefan Fjeldmark; Karsten Kiilerich
- Release date: 1997
- Countries: Estonia; Denmark

When Life Departs (original title: Når livet går sin vej) is a 1997 Danish-Estonian animated short film directed by Stefan Fjeldmark and Karsten Kiilerich.

== Summary ==
The film illustrates the various thoughts children have about death.

== Production ==
The animation was produced at the A. Film A/S headquarters in Tallinn, Estonia, with lead animators Ando Tammik and Meelis Arulepp. It was included in the Animation Show of Shows.

== Awards and nominations ==
- 1999: Academy Awards Nominated, Best Animated Short Film
- 1998: Silver Poznań Goats for Best Foreign Animation Movie at 16th Ale Kino! Festival
- 1998: World Animation Celebration, UNICEF Award
- 1997: Corto Imola Festival, Best International Film

== See also ==
- Animated documentary
