= Mumble Bumble =

1998-2000 Canadian-Danish animated television series

- Created by: Christian Skjøtt
- Developed by: Peter Gren Larsen; Karsten Kiilerich
- Written by: Karsten Kiilerich; Christian Skjøtt
- Directed by: Karsten Kiilerich; Martin Skov
- Voices of: Mark Trafford; Bruce Dinsmore; Laura Teasdale; Dean Hagopian; Daniel Brochu
- Narrated by: Harry Standjofski
- Composer: Pierre-Daniel Rheault
- Countries of origin: Canada; Denmark
- Original language: English
- No. of episodes: 65

Production
- Executive producers: Micheline Charest; Ronald A. Weinberg; Poul Kofod
- Producers: Cassandra Schafhausen; Anders Mastrup
- Running time: 5 minutes
- Production companies: Egmont Imagination; CINAR Corporation

Original release
- Network: CBC Television
- Release: 1998 – 2000

Mumble Bumble is a children's animated television series created by Christian Skjøtt and produced by Egmont Imagination and the CINAR Corporation (now WildBrain).

== Overview and production ==
The show follows the adventures of an imaginative blue hippopotamus named Mumble Bumble, the title character, and his best friends, Chic'o, an inquisitive chicken, and Greens, a busy frog. Recurring characters include Roc and Oink. The idea, which is designed to be both educational and entertaining for a preschool audience, was devised by a mastermind named Christian Skjøtt, creator of the show. Episodes have a run time of five minutes.

== Television airing ==
In Canada, the show was broadcast on CBC Television and on Knowledge Kids. In foreign countries, it was also broadcast on Rai 3 in Italy, CITV and Tiny Living in the United Kingdom, Network 2 in Ireland, La Cinquième in France, Kindernet in the Netherlands, ZAZ in Mexico, SABC2 and on e.tv in South Africa, ABS-CBN in the Philippines, ATV in Hong Kong and TV Cultura in Brazil.

== Reception ==
Andrew Clark of Maclean's said that the show has "fanciful settings" through having Mumble Bumble reside in a windmill at the base of a lake and features "everyday childhood trappings". The South China Morning Post said Mumble Bumble provided "rainy Sunday fun for the kids" through its edutainment and animation.
