= Stefan Gossler =

German actor (1955–2026)

Stefan Gossler (14 December 1955 – 19 January 2026) was a German actor who specialised in dubbing.

Gossler was born in Siegen, West Germany on 14 December 1955, and died on 19 January 2026, at the age of 70.

== Voice roles ==
=== Anime ===
- Case Closed (Vodka)
- Digimon Frontier (Gigasmon, Grumblemon)
- Dr. Slump (Doctor Mashirito (first voice))
- Dragon Ball Z and Dragon Ball Z Kai (Cell)
- Texhnolyze (Keigo Ōnishi)
- The Vision of Escaflowne (Dryden Fassa)

=== Dubbing roles ===
- Glee (Principal Figgins (Iqbal Theba))
- Madagascar (King Julien (Sacha Baron Cohen))
  - The Penguins of Madagascar (King Julien (Danny Jacobs)
- The Medallion (Eddie Yang (Jackie Chan))
- Ned's Declassified School Survival Guide (Mister Melvin Kwest (Dave "Gruber" Allen))
- Rumble in the Bronx (Keung (Jackie Chan))
- Rush Hour (Chief Inspector Lee (Jackie Chan))
- Rush Hour 2 (Chief Inspector Lee (Jackie Chan))
- Rush Hour 3 (Chief Inspector Lee (Jackie Chan))
- The Santa Clause 3: The Escape Clause (Santa Claus/Scott Calvin (Tim Allen))
- The Shaggy Dog (Dave Douglas (Tim Allen))
- Thunderbolt (Chan Foh To (Jackie Chan))
- Wild Hogs (Doug Madsen (Tim Allen))
