= Karsten Kiilerich =

Danish film and television director

Karsten Kiilerich (born 21 January 1955 in Slagelse) is a Danish film and television director, screenwriter and animator. He is a co-founder of the Danish animation studio A. Film Production, for which he still actively works. Kiilerich has been involved in over 20 feature and short films.

Kiilerich's animated short When Life Departs (1997) was nominated for several awards, including the Academy Award for Best Animated Short Film. He was also nominated for the Robert Award for Best Screenplay for Help! I'm a Fish (2000).

== Biography ==
Killerich was born in the town of Slagelse, Zealand on 21 January 1955. He initially worked as a school teacher.

=== Film career ===
He began his career in 1986 when he worked as an assistant animator for the film Valhalla. On 1 August 1988, Kiilerich co-founded the Danish animation studio A. Film Production alongside Stefan Fjeldmark, Jørgen Lerdan, Hans Perk and Anders Mastrup, and they continue to work closely with each other. He worked as an animator and created several of his own short films throughout the 1990s and early 2000s. His feature film debut was The Ugly Duckling and Me!, released in 2006.

== Filmography ==
Year	Film	Credited as			Notes
Year	Film	Director	Writer	Animator	Notes
1997	When Life Departs Når livet går sin vej	Yes	Yes	Yes	Short film; nominated for the Academy Award for Best Animated Short Film
2000	Help! I'm a Fish	No	Yes	No	Nominated for the Robert Award for Best Screenplay
2006	The Ugly Duckling and Me! Den grimme ælling og mig	Yes	Yes	Yes	Feature film debut
2015	Albert	Yes	Yes	Yes	
2017	The Little Vampire 3D	Yes	No	No	
2018	Up and Away Hodja fra Pjort	Yes	Yes	Yes	
2020	Raggie Sipsik	Yes	Yes	Yes	
2023	Panda Bear in Africa	Yes	Yes	Yes	Upcoming film

== See also ==
- Hans Perk–co-founder of A. Film Production, frequent collaborator
