= Dick Bruna =

Dutch author and artist (1927–2017)

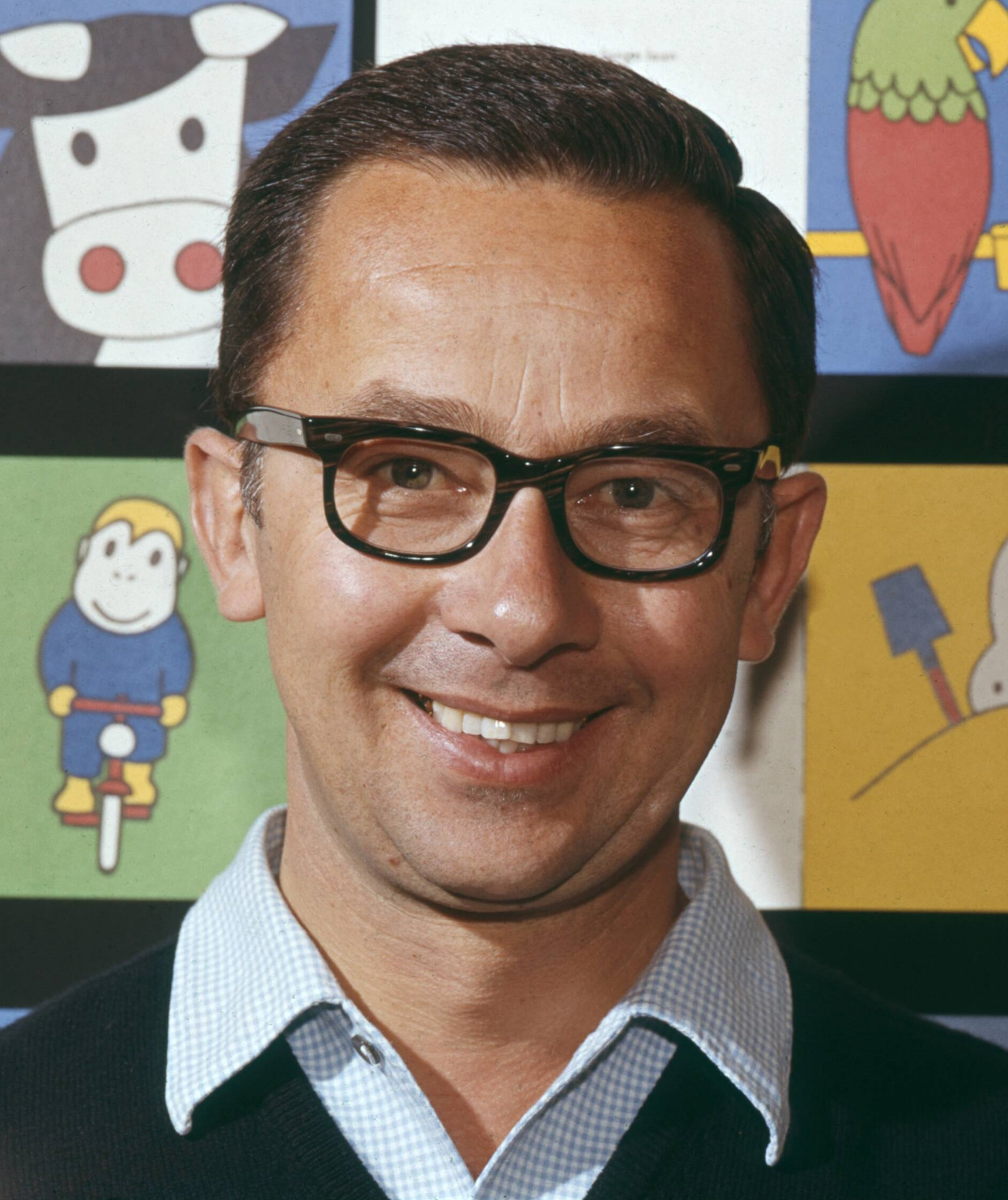
- Bruna in 1967
- Born: Hendrik Magdalenus Bruna; 23 August 1927; Utrecht, Netherlands
- Died: 16 February 2017 (aged 89); Utrecht, Netherlands
- Known for: Artist, graphic designer, illustrator/author of children's books
- Notable work: Miffy
- Spouse: Irene de Jongh (m. 1953)
- Awards: Golden Paintbrush

Hendrik Magdalenus "Dick" Bruna, 23 August 1927 – 16 February 2017) was a Dutch author, artist, illustrator and graphic designer.

Bruna was best known for his children's books which he authored and illustrated, numbering over 200. His most notable creation was Miffy (Nijntje in the original Dutch), a small rabbit drawn with heavy graphic lines, simple shapes and primary colours. Bruna also created stories for characters such as Boris Bear, Poppy Pig, Snuffy, Lottie, Farmer John, Kitty Nelly, and Hettie Hedgehog.

Aside from his prolific catalog of children's books, Bruna also illustrated and designed book covers, posters and promotional materials for his father's publishing company A.W. Bruna & Zoon. His most popular designs graced the covers of the Zwarte Beertjes (English, "little black bears") series of books. Well known among his designs are those for Simenon's Maigret books, typified by graphic silhouettes of a pipe on various backgrounds.

== Biography ==
Dick Bruna's father, A. W. Bruna, directed the family-owned publishing company Bruna, with his brother Henk Bruna. His father's intentions were for Bruna to follow in his footsteps, but Bruna had different plans and wanted to be an artist. He traveled to London and lived for a while in Paris, where he fell under the influence of Fernand Léger, Pablo Picasso, and especially Henri Matisse. Back in the Netherlands he attended the Rijksakademie van beeldende kunsten in Amsterdam but soon quit; he said afterwards that he had no talent as a painter and could not draw perspective.

In 1955, while on family holiday, he saw a rabbit hopping around and later made attempts to draw it, thereby creating "Nijntje" ("Miffy" in English), the way a Dutch child might say the diminutive konijntje ('little rabbit').

Bruna illustrated over 2,000 covers and over 100 posters for the family business, A.W. Bruna & Zoon. But when the Amsterdam company Art Unlimited decided to publish Poster & Postcards following Roby Bellemans's traveling international exhibitions with Dutch and other children book illustrators, Dick Bruna approached Roby about this collaboration and decided to let Art Unlimited publish his “Nijntje” cards. His most recognized illustrations were for the Zwarte Beertjes (English: little black bears) series of books, including The Saint, James Bond, Simenon, and Shakespeare. He has said that the Japanese character Hello Kitty was copied from Miffy.

In 2014, Bruna announced his retirement, after which the rights to the Miffy character were not to be sold. In March 2016 he was awarded the Max Velthuijs-prijs.

Bruna died of natural causes in his sleep in Utrecht on 16 February 2017 at the age of 89.

== Bibliography (as children's author) ==
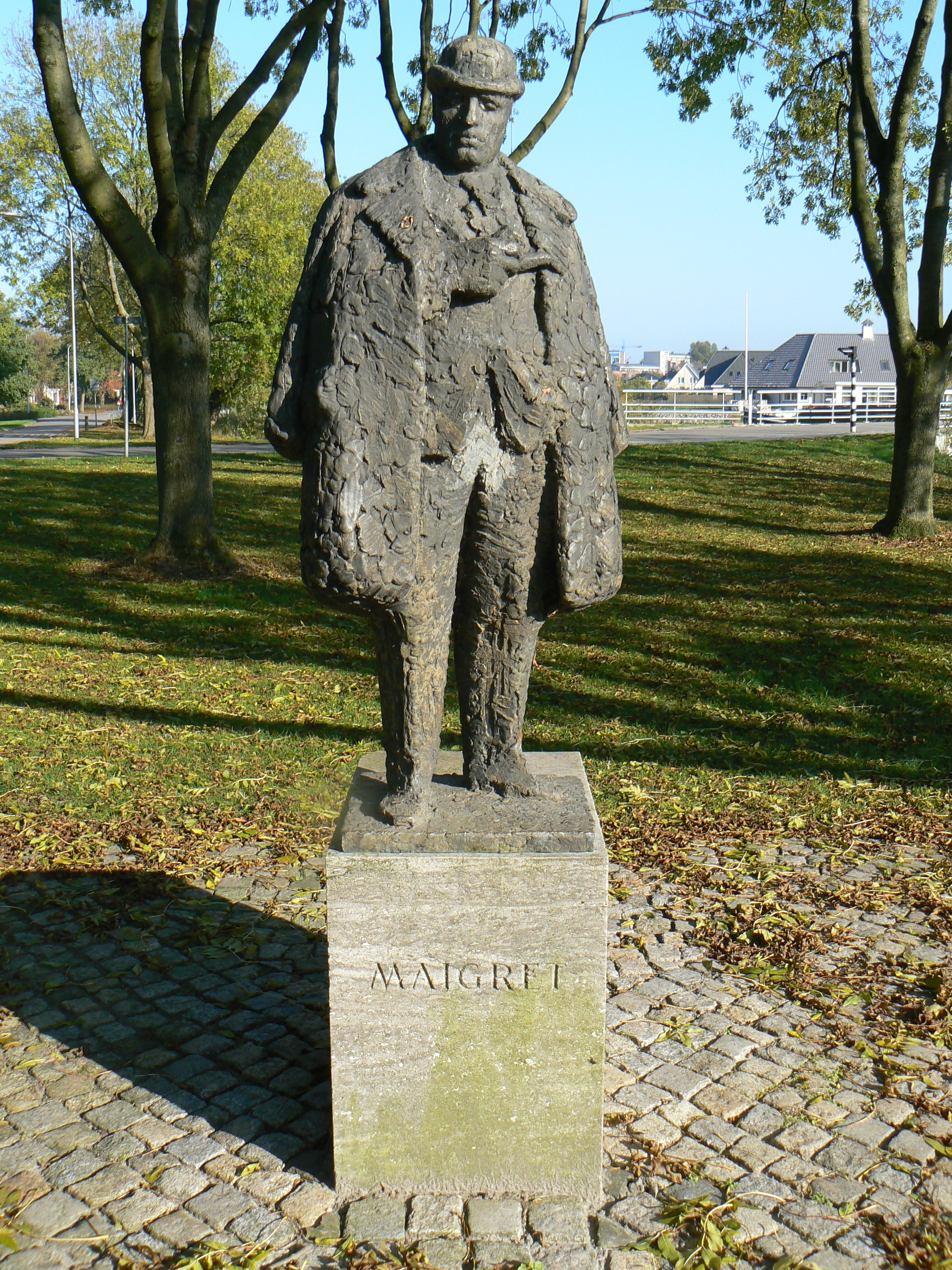
Jules Maigret sculpture offered to Delfzijl, Netherlands by A.W. Bruna Uitgevers.

Bruna published 120 children's book titles, the last being Miffy is Naughty in 2017.

=== Books by Dick Bruna ===
- 1953 The Apple
- 1955 Toto In Volendam, Miffy, Miffy at the Zoo, The Small King
- 1957 Tijs, The Car
- 1959 The Apple, The Little Bird, Kitty Nell, Tilly and Tessa
- 1962 The Egg, The King, Circus, The Fish
- 1963 The Christmas Book, Miffy, Miffy at the Zoo, Miffy in the Snow, Miffy at the Seaside

== Influences ==
At a young age Bruna started drawing, but was also influenced by artists of other art forms. He drew covers for his school newspaper in Walt Disney style. Later he admired Rembrandt and Van Gogh.

The biggest influence was perhaps Matisse. Dick Bruna's first works were based on collages by the French painter. Bruna has also been noted to have been influenced by the Dutch graphic design movement, De Stijl, in particular the work of architect Gerrit Rietveld.

== Partial list of biographies and monographs ==
- Petit Glam Issue no. 3- Paradise in Pictograms Issue. Petit Glam. 1998. ISBN 4-7713-0329-0.
- Jansen, Bert (1998). Dick Bruna boekomslagen. Centraal Museum. ISBN 90-73285-71-2.
- Widdershoven, Thomas; Thomas Widdershoven; Gert Staal (1998). boris en de paraplu. Centraal Museum. ISBN 90-73285-74-7.
- Yanagimoto, Koichi, ed. (2004). Zwarte Beertjes- Book Cover Designs by Dick Bruna. Glyph.
- Linders, Joke; Joke Linders; Koosje Sierman; Ivo de Wijs; Truusje Vrooland-Löb (2006). Dick Bruna (English ed.). Waanders Publisher, Zwolle/Mercis Publishing, Amsterdam. ISBN 90-400-8342-8.
- Reitsma, Ella; Ella Reisma (1989). Kees Nieuwenhuijzen (ed.). Het paradijs in Pictogram (Paradise in Pictograms). Mercis Publishing, Amsterdam.
- Kohnstamm, Dolph (1991). The eye demands an eye- Reflections about the children's books by Dick Bruna (English ed.). Mercis Publishing, Amsterdam. ISBN 90-73991-03-X.
- ディック・ブルーナ (2005). ディック・ブルーナ ぼくのこと、ミッフィーのこと (単行本). Kodansha publishers, Ltd. 講談社. ISBN 4-06-212826-8.
- All About Dick Bruna ディック・ブルーナのすべて (単行本). Kodansha publishers, Ltd. 講談社. 1999–2002. ISBN 4-06-208962-9.
