= Kajagoogoo discography =

- Studio albums: 4
- Extended plays: 3
- Live albums: 2
- Compilation albums: 9
- Singles: 8
- Other singles: 2

This article is the discography of British pop band Kajagoogoo and includes all the studio albums, live albums, compilations, and singles, as well as the peak chart positions for the United Kingdom, Austria^{1}, Germany, Netherlands^{1}, New Zealand, Sweden^{1}, Switzerland and United States.

== Albums ==
=== Studio albums ===
Title	Release	Peak chart positions									Certifications
Title	Release	UK	AUS	AUT	GER	NL	NZ	SWE	SWZ	US	Certifications
White Feathers	Release date: 1983; Label: EMI	5	53	15	7	36	17	7	—	38	BPI: Silver
Islands	Release date: 1984; Label: EMI	35	—	—	17	19	—	—	13	185	
Crazy Peoples Right to Speak as Kaja	Release date: 1985; Label: EMI	—	—	—	—	—	—	—	—	—	
Gone to the Moon	Release date: 2008; Label: Spectra	—	—	—	—	—	—	—	—	—	
"—" denotes releases that did not chart

=== Live albums ===
Title	Release
Live in Tokyo 1984	Release date: 2005; Label: Dfp
BBC In Concert: 30th May 1983 (Live at Hammersmith Odeon)	Release date: 2009; Label: EMI

=== Compilation albums ===
Title	Release
Too Shy: The Singles and More (with Limahl)	Release date: 1993; Label: EMI
The Best of Kajagoogoo & Limahl (with Limahl)	Release date: 1996; Label: Disky
The Very Best of Kajagoogoo	Release date: 1996; Label: EMI
Premium Gold Collection	Release date: 1998; Label: EMI
Best of the 80's: Kajagoogoo & Limahl (with Limahl)	Release date: 2000; Label: Disky
The Very Best of Kajagoogoo & Limahl (with Limahl)	Release date: 2003; Label: EMI
Greatest Hits	Release date: 2008; Label: Daydream
Too Shy: the Best of Kajagoogoo & Limahl (with Limahl)	Release date: 2009; Label: EMI
So80s (Soeighties) Presents Kajagoogoo	Release date: 2011; Label: EMI

== Extended plays ==
Title	Release
Extra Play as Kaja	Release date: 1984; Label: EMI America
Death Defying Headlines	Release date: 2008; Label: Red Dot Music
Death Defying Headlines - The Dance Remixes	Release date: 2009; Label: Red Dot Music

== Singles ==
Year	Title	Peak chart positions										Album
Year	Title	UK	AUS	AUT	GER	IRE	NL	NZ	SWE	SWZ	US	Album
1983	"Too Shy"	1	6	4	1	1	5	2	4	2	5	White Feathers
1983	"Ooh to Be Ah"	7	68	—	20	7	—	50	—	—	—	White Feathers
1983	"Hang on Now"	13	—	—	41	10	—	—	—	—	78	White Feathers
1983	"Big Apple"	8	—	—	13	11	14	31	—	7	—	Islands
1984	"The Lion's Mouth"	25	—	—	40	—	—	—	—	—	—	Islands
1984	"Turn Your Back on Me"	47	—	—	25	—	13	—	—	—	—	Islands
1985	"Shouldn't Do That" (as Kaja)	63	—	—	—	—	—	—	—	—	—	Crazy Peoples Right to Speak
2007	"Rocket Boy"	—	—	—	—	—	—	—	—	—	—	Gone to the Moon
"—" denotes releases that did not chart

=== Non-album singles ===
Year	Title	Album
2009	"White Feathers (Manhattan Clique Remix)"	White Feathers (Manhattan Clique Remixes)

== Videography ==
- 1983 – Kajagoogoo: White Feathers Tour (Picture Music International: VHS/Beta/Laserdisc/CED)[Picture Music International]
- 1983 – Too Shy – The Video E.P. (Picture Music International: VHS/Beta/Laserdisc [PMI/Pioneer Artists])
- 2009 – Too Shy: the Best of Kajagoogoo & Limahl (CD & DVD) [EMI]

== Notes ==
^{1} – In the Netherlands, there are the catalogue rules in the albums chart from 2003. From this date, a back catalogue chart was established. In Sweden and Norway the albums chart is divided into Top Fullprice Albums and Top Midprice Albums. Furthermore, prior September 1993, the charts in Sweden were bi-weekly, as well as the charts in Austria during the '80s (monthly in the '70s).

^{2} – Digital release.
