= Do Nothing till You Hear from Me (album) =

2016 studio album by the Mute Gods

Studio album by The Mute Gods
- Released: 22 January 2016
- Recorded: 2015
- Genre: Progressive rock, pop rock
- Length: 59:49
- Label: InsideOut
- Producer: Roger King

The Mute Gods chronology
Do Nothing till You Hear from Me (2016)	Tardigrades Will Inherit the Earth (2018)

Do Nothing till You Hear from Me is the first studio album by the Mute Gods, the band formed by Nick Beggs, Roger King and Marco Minnemann. The album was released on 22 January 2016 through InsideOut.

== Background ==
Nick Beggs began to put a band together at the suggestion of Thomas Waber, of record label InsideOut. In 2014, Beggs approached Roger King — a fellow member of Steve Hackett's band for several years — with the suggestion that King would produce Beggs' new band; King took up the offer. Beggs also called on the services of drummer Marco Minnemann, with whom had toured as part of Steven Wilson's solo band. Beggs revealed that he wrote the majority of the album while on tour in 2014. Beggs announced the creation of his new group, The Mute Gods, in August 2015, and two months later revealed that their debut album, Do Nothing till You Hear from Me, would be released in January 2016. Minnemann, who is featured on most of the album's tracks, contributed some guitar parts and sound modelling to the album, in addition to drums. Nick D'Virgilio and Gary O'Toole are also represented on the album as guest drummers.

In November 2015, the band released two videos for the album's title track. One is a 'normal' music video, while the other is a 360 degree video, directed by Crystal Spotlight. Two weeks before the scheduled release of the album, a video for "Feed the Troll" was also released. A video for "Father Daughter" was released on 22 January, to coincide with the album's release.

Two further promo videos were released later in 2016, for "Praying To A Mute God" and "Night School For Idiots" respectively.

== Themes ==
Beggs has described Do Nothing till You Hear from Me as "a rather disgruntled rant at the dystopia we've created for ourselves and our children". He further opines that "The people in this world who should be listened to are often the ones who are silenced. The voice of reason seems strangely quiet in the face of so much media disinformation".

The title track, "Do Nothing till You Hear from Me", was inspired by former U.S. President Dwight D. Eisenhower's warning about the potential rise of the military–industrial complex, as well as the geologist Phil Schneider, who made several claims regarding UFOs in the 1990s, before dying under mysterious circumstances. According to Beggs, the title "sums up how I feel about religion".

Beggs also singles out the tracks "Swimming Horses" and "Feed the Troll". The former is as "a warning about the passing of time and the rising of tides", and the latter, as the title suggests, relates to trolls, described by Beggs as people "who have too much time on their hands".

The album is dedicated to the late Yes bassist Chris Squire.

== Track listing ==
All songs written and composed by Nick Beggs, except where noted.

No.	Title	Writer(s)	Length
1.	"Do Nothing till You Hear from Me"		7:45
2.	"Praying to a Mute God"		5:06
3.	"Night School for Idiots"		6:00
4.	"Feed the Troll"		4:55
5.	"Your Dark Ideas"		4:41
6.	"Last Man on Earth" (bonus track)	Beggs, Ricky Wilde	5:30
7.	"In the Cross-Hairs"	Beggs, Roger King	3:18
8.	"Strange Relationship"		6:10
9.	"Swimming Horses"	Beggs, Nick D'Virgilio, Rob Reed	7:05
10.	"Mavro Capelo" (bonus track)		5:10
11.	"Father Daughter"	Beggs, Wilde, Lula Beggs	4:09
Total length:			59:49

== Personnel ==
Adapted from Do Nothing till You Hear from Me liner notes.

The Mute Gods

- Nick Beggs - lead vocals (tracks 1 to 11), bass guitars (tracks 1 to 10), Chapman Stick (tracks 2, 5, 7, 10 and 11), guitars (tracks 1 to 3, 5, 7, 8 and 9), keyboards (tracks 1 to 5 and 7 to 10), programming (tracks 1 to 5 and 7 to 10), executive production
- Roger King - guitars (tracks 1 to 7, 10 and 11), keyboards (tracks 1 to 7, 10 and 11), programming (tracks 1 to 5, 7 and 10), backing vocals (tracks 2 and 5), mixing (tracks 1 to 7, 10 and 11)
- Marco Minnemann - drums (1 to 7, 10 and 11), additional percussion (track 1), guitars (tracks 1 and 2), piano (track 2)

Additional personnel

- Glenn Kelly - recording of ethnic voices (track 1)
- Adel Ekladios - Arabic voice (track 1)
- Kevin Tang - Mandarin voice (track 1)
- Ricky Wilde - backing vocals, keyboards, programming, guitars (all on tracks 6 and 11)
- Frank van Bogaert - backing vocals (tracks 8 and 9), piano (track 8), keyboards (tracks 8 and 9), Hammond organ (track 9), mixing (tracks 8 and 9)
- Gary O'Toole - drums (track 8)
- Nick D'Virgilio - drums, guitars, keyboards (all on track 9)
- Rob Reed - guitars, keyboards (all on track 9)
- Adam Holzman - keyboards, programming (all on track 10)
- Lula Beggs - vocals, FX (all on track 11)
