= The Mute Gods =

English progressive rock supergroup

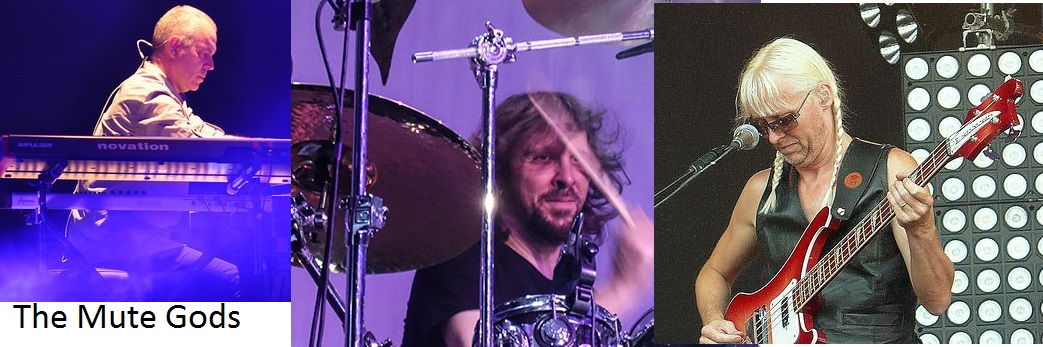
- Roger King, Marco Minnemann, and Nick Beggs.

Background information
- Genre: Progressive rock
- Years active: 2014–present
- Label: InsideOut
- Members: Nick Beggs; Roger King; Marco Minnemann
- Website: themutegods.com

The Mute Gods are an English progressive rock supergroup uniting Nick Beggs, Marco Minnemann and Roger King. Beggs approached King—with whom he had worked as part of Steve Hackett's band—about a collaboration in 2014, and Minnemann was chosen as the drummer after Beggs had toured with him as part of Steven Wilson's band.

== History ==
=== Do Nothing till You Hear from Me (2014–2016) ===
Their debut album, Do Nothing till You Hear from Me was released on 22 January 2016. Beggs wrote the majority of the album on tour in 2014, and has described it as "a rather disgruntled rant at the dystopia we've created for ourselves and our children". In addition to Minnemann, the album features some guest drummers, including Nick D'Virgilio and Gary O'Toole. In November 2015, the band released two videos, one of which being a 360 degree video, for the album's title track. According to Nick Beggs, "Do Nothing till You Hear from Me" was inspired by Dwight D. Eisenhower's warning about the potential rise of the military–industrial complex, as well as the geologist Phil Schneider, who made several claims regarding UFOs, before dying under mysterious circumstances.

The band won the 'Vanguard' award at the 2016 Progressive Music Awards, hosted at Shakespeare's Globe Under Globe on 1 September 2016.

=== Tardigrades Will Inherit the Earth (2016–2018) ===
Beggs stated in 2016 that a second album was due for release in early 2017, describing the album "as angry as a rattle snake with its tail caught in a car door!".

The album, Tardigrades Will Inherit the Earth, was announced on 5 December 2016 for release on 27 February 2017. The album's first single, "We Can't Carry On", was released on 13 January 2017. The album was finally released on 24 February 2017, along with a video for the title track.

=== Atheists And Believers (2018–present) ===
Beggs has said that their third album will be released on March 22, 2019, and will feature a guest appearance by Alex Lifeson of Rush. Speaking of the album he said "This one is more melodic and I think it might have a bit more of a pop edge to it". He also hinted there were no plans for further material.

== Band members ==
- Nick Beggs – bass guitars, Chapman Stick, guitars, keyboards, vocals
- Roger King – keyboards, guitars, backing vocals, production
- Marco Minnemann – drums, guitars, sound modelling

== Discography ==
- Do Nothing till You Hear from Me (2016)
- Tardigrades Will Inherit the Earth (2017)
- Atheists and Believers (2019)
