= Guillermo Cides =

Argentine musician

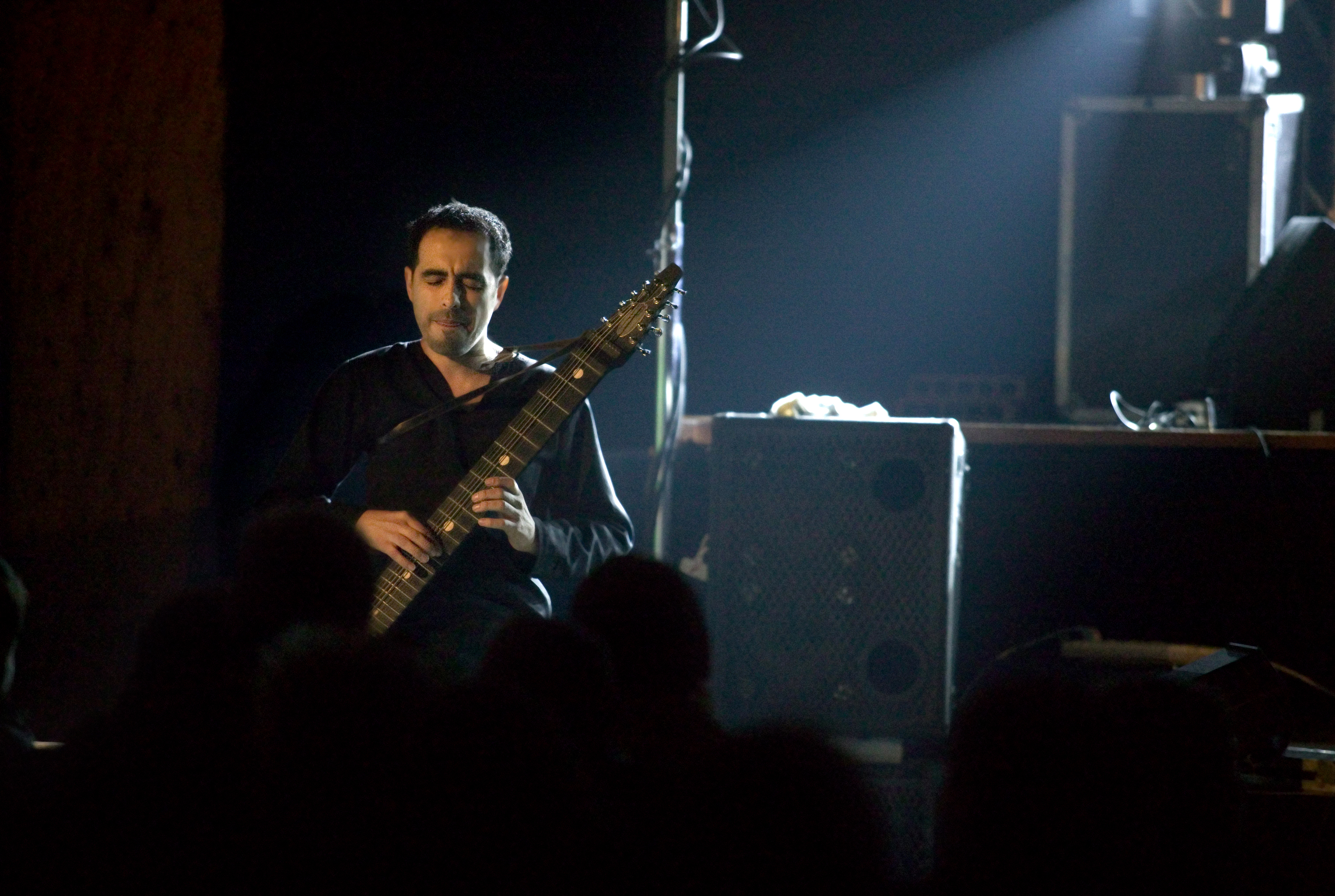
Guillermo Cides in concert

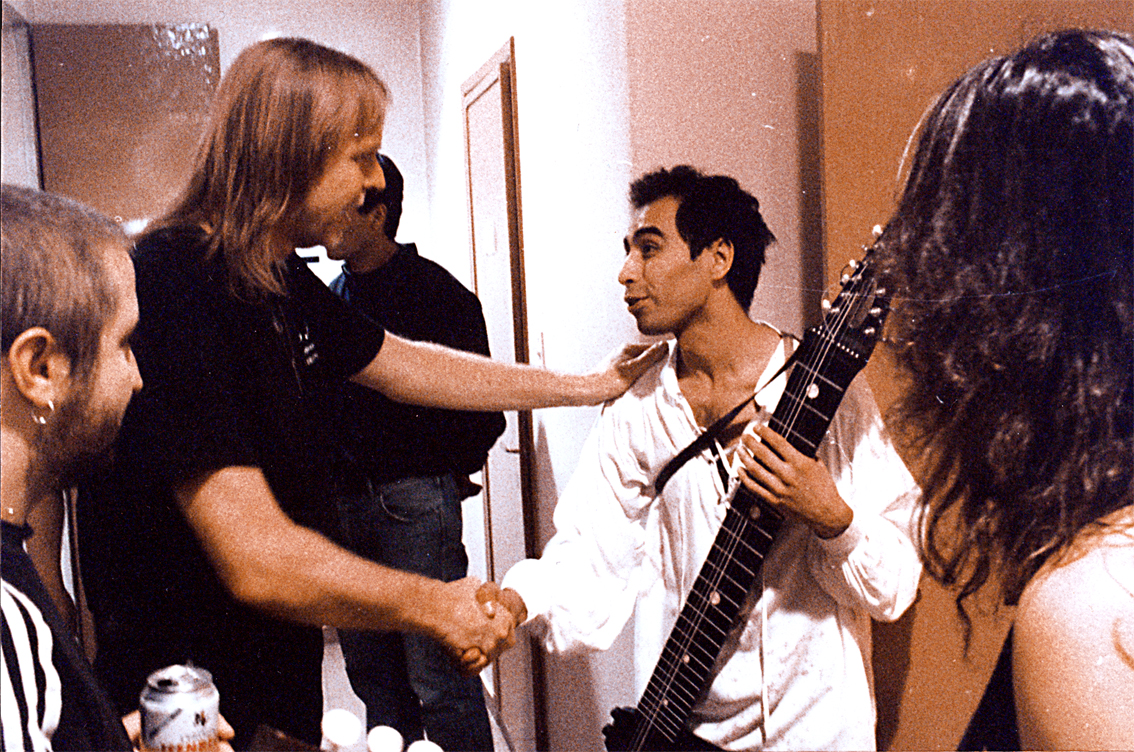
Rick Wakeman-Cides

The Stickista Guillermo Cides is an Argentinian musician recognized internationally for his concerts and CDs played with the Stick. A pioneer in solo Stick concerts in his country, Cides has performed a large number of concerts in different countries throughout a musical career of more than 15 years, becoming one of the most highly regarded players of this instrument.

== The Stick ==
The Chapman Stick combines bass / chords and guitar, is hung diagonally on the chest and is played by tapping the strings with the fingers of both hands simultaneously with a piano-like logic, transforming the musician into a tactile percussionist. It was invented by the Californian luthier Emmett Chapman in the 1970s and is at present hand-made by its inventor.

== Biography ==
Guillermo Cides was born in Córdoba (Argentina), lived in Olavarría and studied medicine for 3 years at the University of La Plata, then established himself in Buenos Aires and started to work specifically in music, influenced by his friend and musician Sergio Petaco.

Initially as the guitarist and then bassist of the band La Cruz (together with his brother Marcelo Cides), he encountered the Stick in Argentina in 1992. He bought his first Stick with the money that he was earning as a peddler in the streets of Buenos Aires and learned to play it without any teachers. Eight months later he offered the First Solo Stick Concert in Buenos Aires, Argentina, in the Nativo bar, beginning a musical career that continues to this day.

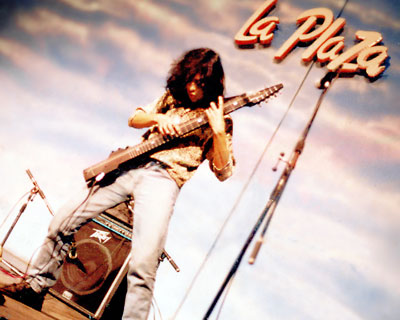
Primeros conciertos

During the period ' 92 / ' 94 he dedicated himself to playing in alternative jazz and rock venues in Buenos Aires in order to learn and practice on his instrument. He was in the custom of creating spontaneous improvisations in the underground bar The Dragoon, the place where bands such as Las Manos de Filippi were formed, with those who shared the post-dictatorship philosophy nights at that time. In the same way he was frequenting the jazz venue El Subsuelo where he met the famous violinist Jorge Pinchevsky and the singer Viviana Scaliza (Blacanblus) with whom he also shared stages. In the same period he was invited by the musician Carca to form part of the final lineup of Tía Newton, a band in the rock/progressive style.

In 1994, the sound engineer Guillermo Zuloaga asked him to produce his first solo CD which was edited at the end of 1994, called The Inner World of the Planets. It is considered to be a significant CD inside the world of the Stick. The inventor of the instrument Emmett Chapman wrote to Cides in a letter: " ... you have made real what I had in mind when I designed this instrument " after listening to his first work.

In the same year he took part in a seminar directed by the British guitarist Robert Fripp in Gándara, Argentina. There he made contact with Los Gauchos Alemanes with whom he would share concerts. The same year he played at a dinner for some of King Crimson members and he met the Stickista Trey Gunn. At that time Gunn declared in a radio interview: " ... the best Stickista that I have seen in my life lives here and is called Guillermo Cides." (The Intruso-FM Alfa broadcast programme).

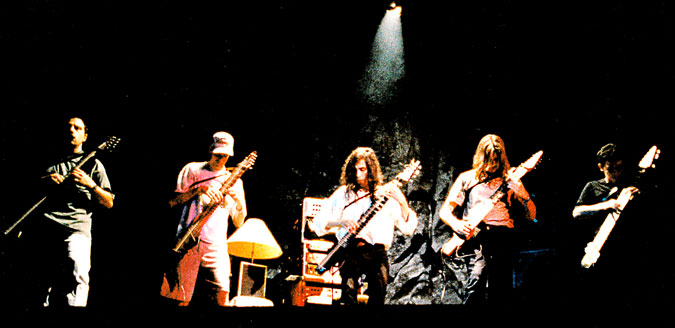
Ensamble Argentino

In 1995 he decided to found the first Stickistas' Center in Argentina offering information and classes to musicians from his country, forming a generation of new stickistas and creating the first Stickistas' Ensamble Argentino, with which he carried out tours. His solo concerts were highly considered by the newspapers of his country. Finally he achieved recognition as an artist in the written media despite the lack of support from a multinational label. He appeared on TV and complete interviews were dedicated to him. He was invited by the musician Lito Vitale in two occasions to appear on his television programme Ese amigo del Alma.

In the years ' 97 and ' 98 he presented his shows in theatres and carried out national tours. He also collaborated with artists from his home country on CDs and concerts, including Antonio Birabent (with whom he recorded the song "Across de Universe" which was included in the tribute CD to the band Sumo), Santos Luminosos and Dengue among others.

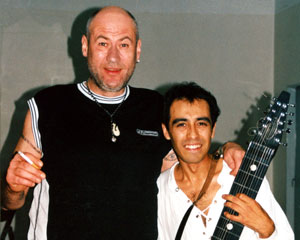
Fish-Cides

In 1998 he edited his second CD album called Primitivo, this time with several guests and other instruments. In the same year he began to present his concerts in Europe. He travelled to London on several occasions and came to know Fish (ex-singer of the group Marillion) sharing stages as guest artist more than once. In that year Cides also opened concerts for Emerson, Lake & Palmer, John Wetton (Asia), Rick Wakeman (Yes).

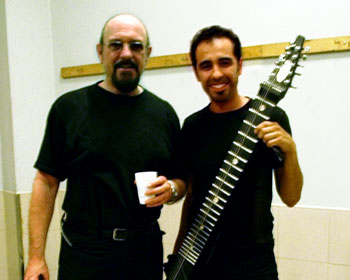
Ian Anderson-Cides

In 1998 he did a tour of 10 concerts in South America together with Roger Hodgson (Supertramp) for a total of 50.000 persons; later in 2004 he would open two Jethro Tull concerts in the Theatre Coliseum of Argentina for an audience of 10.000 and years later he would play with Trey Gunn and California Guitar Trio sharing respective tours in Spain.

From 1999 Cides decided to live in Europe for half of the year and the rest of the year in his native land. Taking root between Barcelona, the Netherlands and Argentina, Cides recorded his CD tribute to J. S. Bach played totally on Stick, in a Dutch town called Leeuwarden. The CD The Bach Tribute by Cides was edited in 2000 during the "Year Bach". This one was the first CD of classical music recorded with the Stick and it is considered to be a unique work with this instrument. In the following years he would perform more concerts between Europe and Argentina.

In 2002 Cides decided to withdraw his CDs from the market, anticipating the record crisis that would happen some years later and dedicated himself solely to live concerts. In the same year he left Argentina and moved permanently to Barcelona to create the Stick Center in Spain that was officially presented on March 7 in the school Aula de Musics de Barcelona. There he began a new musical career in a country where his music was still unknown. In the following years his activity in Spain popularized the Stick, offering his solo concerts in diverse Spanish festivals (see below).

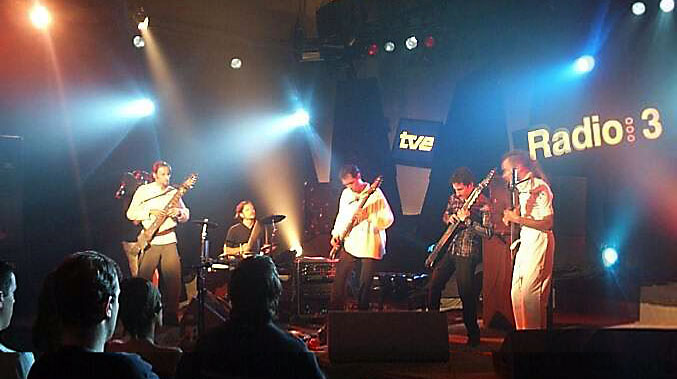
Ensamble español en TV

He also distinguished himself in the following years with the creation of the Spanish Ensamble de Stickistas, presentations on Television and National Spanish Radio and the consolidation on the Internet of www.stickcenter.com as the first portal in Spanish about this instrument. Through the Stick Center, Cides organized the first Stick Camp in Spain with instructors from different countries and presented many new Stick artists, besides information and news relating to the instrument.

From 2003 and for the following 3 years he would write in the Spanish magazines Bajista and Guitarra Actual with monthly pages called Stick Center's Pages.

Established finally in Spain and concentrating only on live concerts, from 2004 Cides created several different groups besides his usual solo appearances. In this way The Stick Trío was formed (Cides, Lampi, Baggerman), Electrik Consort (Cides on Stick, Grandia on Hurdy-Gurdy, Mercader on percussion), Dj d_Melmac + Cides, and the Meeting Bao / Cides / Blavia with whom he took part in several festivals in Spain. All the groups would be characterized by a daring musical and instrumental gamble in combination with the Stick.

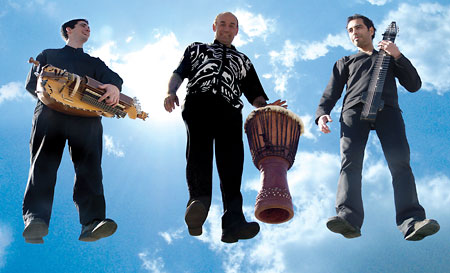
Cides & Electrik Consort

With all the projects in progress, in 2006 he produced and edited a Hispanic Stickistas Compilation presenting 22 artists of the Stick. On this album and for the first time, Cides and the inventor of the Stick Emmett Chapman record together a song called Gonnawannaland.

In 2007 the drummer Jerry Marotta (Peter Gabriel’s ex drummer) invited Cides to do a tour as a duo. In this way they crossed several European countries during that year and the following one.

Cides returns finally to the record world in 2009 with an idea without precedent on the Internet: an on-line shop where different artists sign CDs one to one and send them directly to the public. In the same year he edits two albums simultaneously: CCA Project (letters that signify the surnames of its members Cushma, Cides and Tim Alexander, with Tony Levin and Trey Gunn as guests, among others) and the Electrik Consort’s début album, one of his groups.

At present, Cides lives in Barcelona. He tours annually with his different projects. As he himself expresses in his interviews, he still plays with his first Stick of 1992.

== Style ==
Guillermo Cides would cultivate his own style with the Stick, marked specially by popular melodies combined with modern sounds and a style of playing that would characterize him in the future. The multiplicity of sounds in the stage generated with the Chapman Stick turned him into a real one-man band. From 1994 he began to experiment with loops, a technology based on recording sounds onstage at the same moment in which they are played and in this way generating complex sonic environments. He was to apply this modern technique in particular to popular and classic melodies (J. S. Bach).

== Discography ==
- 1995 - El Mundo interior de los Planetas (Mundo Records/Stick Center)
- 1998 - Primitivo (Mundo Records/Stick Center)
- 2000 - The Bach Tribute by Cides (Mundo Records/Stick Center)
- Compilado de Stickistas (Stick Center)
- Electrik Consort (Stick Center)
- CCA Project (Stick Center)

== Festival Performances ==
Festival of Jazz de Granada (España) Festival of Música viva de Vic (España) Insolit Music Festival Barcelona (España) Festival of la Guitarra de Cordoba (España) Festival Mar Sessions de Santander (España) Festival of Músicas Avanzadas de Jerez (+ Trilok Gurtuk) (España) Festival of Jazz deTerrassa (España) Festival of Jazz Mas y Mas de Barcelona (España) Festival of Jazz de Lleida (España) Internacional Festival of Guitarra "Villa Gumiel de Izan" (España) Festival Tea07 de Zaragoza (España) Festival of Berantevilla Qonfussion (España) Festival of Rock Progresivo Minorisa de Manresa (España) Festival of verano de Deltebre (España) Festival of Jazz de Torrelavega (España) Festival 8 Horas de Rock de Montcada i Reixac (España) Festival U-zona reggae (España) Festival of Musica Étnica de Menorca (España) Festival Semana Grande de San Sebastian (España) Prog Festival Madrid (España)

Others: Progsud Festival (Francia) Festival Progresivo Crescendo (Francia) Festival of Jazz El Bolson (Argentina) Festival Juan-les-Pins (Francia)
