= Crazy Peoples Right to Speak =

Studio album by Kaja
- Released: 30 September 1985
- Recorded: February–July 1985
- Studios: Sarm West (London); Good Earth (London); Total Access (Los Angeles); Utopia (London); AIR (London); Trident (London)
- Genres: New wave; pop rock
- Length: 40:03
- Labels: EMI, Parlophone
- Producer: Ken Scott

Kaja chronology
Islands (1984)	Crazy Peoples Right to Speak (1985)	Gone to the Moon (2008)

Singles from Crazy Peoples Right to Speak
- 1. "Shouldn't Do That" Released: 26 August 1985

Crazy Peoples Right to Speak is the third studio album by the English new wave band Kajagoogoo, released on 30 September 1985 by Parlophone. The album was not a commercial success and failed to make the UK Top 100. The only single from the album, "Shouldn't Do That", reached No. 63 in the UK.

== Background ==
For this release, the band had shortened its name to Kaja, a name the band had previously used for the U.S. release of their second album, Islands. By this time, the band was a three-piece, as drummer Jez Strode had quit in 1984.

After the failure of the album, the band split up in late 1985. However, after the band was featured on the VH1 program Bands Reunited in 2004, renewed interest in Kajagoogoo prompted EMI to re-issue the band's three studio albums, including Crazy Peoples Right to Speak. The album was remastered and four bonus tracks were added to the original ten tracks: two remixes of "Shouldn't Do That", and two tracks that were previously only available in the single's limited edition gatefold double pack release in 1985.

== Track listing ==
All music written by Steve Askew, Nick Beggs and Stuart Neale. Lyrics by Beggs.

Side one

1. "Do I" – 3:25
2. "Shouldn't Do That" – 3:17
3. "Your Appetite" – 4:21
4. "Rivers" – 4:34
5. "Sit Down and Shut Up" – 3:53

Side two

1. "Afraid of You" – 3:51
2. "Jigsaw" – 3:50
3. "Fear of Falling" – 3:13
4. "Charm of a Gun" – 4:26
5. "You Really Take My Breath Away" – 4:53

== Personnel ==
Kaja

- Nick Beggs – lead vocals, bass guitar, Chapman Stick, percussion
- Steve Askew – guitar, EBow, sitar, vocals
- Stuart Neale – keyboards, drum programming, vocals

Additional musicians

- Dave Mattacks – drums
- Luís Jardim – percussion ("Jigsaw")
- Michael Thompson – guitar solos ("Your Appetite", "Charm of a Gun")
- Annie McCaig – backing vocals ("Your Appetite", "Jigsaw")
- Lezlee Cowling – backing vocals ("Fear of Falling", "Charm of a Gun", "You Really Take My Breath Away")

Technical

- Ken Scott – producer
- Alan Moulder – engineer (Trident)
- Chris Sheldon – engineer (Utopia)
- Gordon Fütter – engineer (Good Earth)
- Heff Moraes – engineer (Sarm West)
- John Jacobs – engineer (AIR)
- Mike Laurdie – engineer (AIR)
- Nigel Walker – engineer (AIR)
- Pabini – engineer (Total Access)
- Wyn Davis – engineer (Total Access)
- Paul Ryan – mixing
- Kaja – mixing (1–10, 13, 14)
- The Square Red Studio – design
- Dave Fathers – illustration
- Trevor Key – photographer
- Peter Ashworth – Kaja photographer
- Kathy Bryan – mastering
