= Winter in Wonderland =

EP by Toyah
- Released: 8 December 2013
- Recorded: 1993
- Genre: Rock
- Length: 19:12
- Label: Vertical Species
- Producer: Toyah Willcox

Winter in Wonderland is an EP by the British singer Toyah Willcox, released in 2013. Apart from the title track, which had originally appeared on her 1993 album Take the Leap!, it included three demo tracks relevant to the period, all of which were previously available only on CD. The EP was only released digitally to mark twenty years since the material was recorded. It was followed a year later by a similar release, Has God Ceased to Dream You.

== Track listing ==
No.	Title	Writer(s)	Length
1.	"Winter in Wonderland" (Album Version)	Toyah Willcox; Nick Beggs; Steven Askew	5:01
2.	"Angel" (Demo)	Willcox; Cris Bonacci	5:10
3.	"Requite Me" (Demo)	Willcox; Simon Darlow	4:26
4.	"Invisible Love" (Demo)	Willcox; Darlow	4:35
