= Islands (Kajagoogoo album) =

Studio album by Kajagoogoo / Kaja
- Released: 21 May 1984
- Studio: Jacob's (Buckinghamshire); Roundhouse (London); Good Earth (London); Farmyard (Chalfont St Giles); The Manor (Oxfordshire)
- Genre: New wave, synth-pop
- Length: 39:36
- Label: EMI (United Kingdom); EMI America Records (United States)
- Producer: Colin Thurston; Kajagoogoo

Kajagoogoo / Kaja chronology
White Feathers (1983)	Islands (1984)	Crazy Peoples Right to Speak (1985)

Alternative cover
- US/Canada cover.

Singles from Islands
- 1. "Big Apple" Released: 5 September 1983; 2. "The Lion's Mouth" Released: 20 February 1984; 3. "Turn Your Back on Me" Released: 24 April 1984

Professional ratings
Review scores
Source	Rating
Smash Hits	7/10 stars
AllMusic	3/5 stars

Islands is the second studio album by the English new wave band Kajagoogoo, released on 21 May 1984 by EMI.

== Background ==
This was the band's first album without lead vocalist Limahl, who had been fired by the band in mid-1983 and went on to pursue a solo career. Bassist Nick Beggs, already having been the singer in the band's previous incarnation as Art Nouveau, resumed lead vocal and lyric duties. The album was co-produced by the band themselves, now a quartet, along with Colin Thurston, who had also produced their debut album, White Feathers (1983). It is the final album to date to feature founding drummer Jez Strode.

== Release ==
The album did not sell as well as its predecessor, peaking at No. 35 on the UK Albums Chart. The first single, "Big Apple", reached No. 8 in the UK, but subsequent singles were less successful, with "The Lion's Mouth" peaking at No. 25 and "Turn Your Back on Me" only reaching No. 47.

The band had shortened their name to Kaja by the time the album was rolled out in North America, where Islands was released as Extra Play with different artwork. This edition also replaces the album version of "Turn Your Back on Me" with a remix by Steve Thompson and Michael Barbiero, which was released as a single and reached No. 2 on the US dance charts. Despite this, the album stalled at No. 185 on the Billboard 200.

In 2004, the original UK album was remastered and issued on CD for the first time, along with seven bonus tracks.

== Track listing ==
All songs written by Kajagoogoo.

Side one

1. "The Lion's Mouth" – 3:32
2. "Big Apple" – 4:09
3. "The Power to Forgive" – 4:45
4. "Melting the Ice Away" – 5:10

Side two

1. "Turn Your Back on Me" – 3:58
2. "Islands" – 4:52
3. "On a Plane" – 4:14
4. "Part of Me Is You" – 3:52
5. "The Loop (Instrumental)" – 4:40

== Personnel ==
Kajagoogoo

- Nick Beggs – vocal (1–8), bass guitar (1–4, 7), Chapman Stick (1, 5, 9), percussion (1, 2, 5, 7, 9), fretless bass (6, 8)
- Stuart Neale – synthesizers (1–9), backing vocals (1, 2, 5, 7), acoustic piano (2–4, 6–9), vocoder (3, 5), PPG programming (4, 5, 7, 9), percussion (6), sequencer (8)
- Steve Askew – guitars (1–3, 5, 6), percussion (2), semi acoustic guitars (4, 7, 9), backing vocals (5), effects (6), electric guitar (7–9), semi acoustic Spanish guitar (8)
- Jez Strode – drums (1–9), percussion (1–5, 7–9), programming (5, 6, 8)

Additional musicians

- Colin Thurston – backing vocals (1, 3–5, 7), percussion (2), vocoder (5)
- Guy Barker – trumpets (1, 2, 7, 9)
- Phil Todd – saxophones (1, 3, 7, 9), solo (7), flutes (7)
- Chris Hunter – saxophone (1, 2, 7)
- Pete Beachill – trombone (1, 8, 9)
- Annie McCaig – backing vocals (4, 8)
- David Geawt – backing vocals (5)

Technical

- Colin Thurston – co-producer
- Kajagoogoo – co-producer, brass arrangements (8)
- Guy Barker – brass arrangements (9)
- Phil Todd – brass arrangements (9)
- Rob Hahnet with Terry & Mark – engineers (Jacob's Studios)
- Mark, Neil, Trevor & John – engineers (Roundhouse)
- Robin & Chris – engineers (Good Earth)
- Andy & Hutch – engineers (Farmyard)
- Steve Chase – engineer (The Manor)
- Dick Jones – assistant engineer
- Gordon Vicary – cutting engineer
- Kathy Bryan – mastering
- Richard Haughton – band photos
- Markus Robinson – lighting
- Mick Karn – inner photo (Thai picture)
- Cream – sleeve design
