= Free Hands =

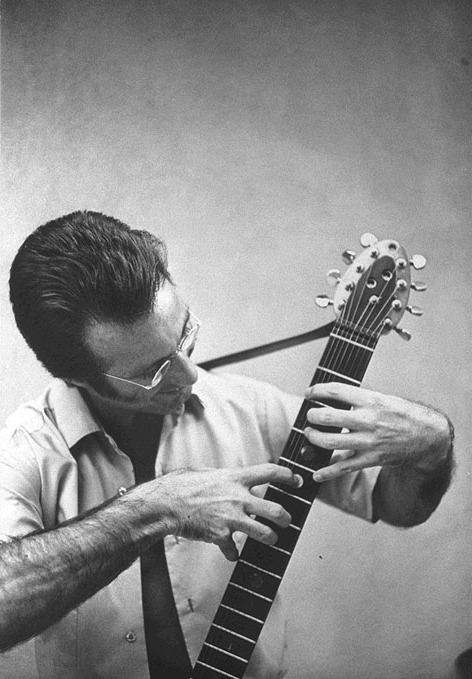
Emmett Chapman - Free Hands method 1969

Free Hands is the name of Emmett Chapman's two-handed tapping method of parallel hands used on his Chapman Stick instrument, and on several other Stick-inspired instruments. Chapman first published his tapping lessons in book form in 1976, and called his method book Free Hands: A New Discipline of Fingers on Strings.

Chapman's method of tapping was the first to facilitate equal access to the strings by aligning the right hand's fingers parallel to the frets, the same orientation as the left hand's, but coming from over the neck instead of under.
