= Has God Ceased to Dream You =

EP by Toyah
- Released: 13 December 2014
- Recorded: 1993
- Genre: Rock
- Length: 24:06
- Label: Vertical Species
- Producer: Toyah Willcox

Has God Ceased to Dream You is an EP by the British singer Toyah Willcox, released in 2014. It is a collection of alternative versions of tracks that appeared on her 1993 album Take the Leap! or were recorded during the album's recording sessions. The EP was released digitally to mark the twentieth anniversary of the CD release of the album, and coincided with Take the Leap! becoming available on digital platforms for the first time.

The original versions of the EP's first three tracks first appeared on the Take the Leap! album and feature on the EP as remixes with alternative vocal recordings. The fourth track, "Tears for Elie", originates from the same sessions as the rest of the EP and was previously available on the 2006 UK CD release of Take the Leap! as issued by Demon Music Group.

Has God Ceased to Dream You was preceded a year earlier by a similar release, Winter in Wonderland, and followed just a few days later by a free digital EP of bonus material, also pertaining to the Take the Leap! album period, entitled Whisper the Elixir.

== Track listing ==
No.	Title	Writer(s)	Length
1.	"God Ceases to Dream" (Remix)	Toyah Willcox; Phil Nicholas	5:44
2.	"Now I'm Running" (Remix)	Willcox; Nicholas	5:33
3.	"It's a Mystery" (Weybridge Rerecorded Version)	Keith Hale; Willcox	6:15
4.	"Tears for Elie" (Demo)	Willcox; Nicholas	6:34
