= White Feathers =

Studio album by Kajagoogoo
- Released: 18 April 1983
- Recorded: 1982–1983
- Studios: Chipping Norton (Oxfordshire); Utopia (London)
- Genre: New wave
- Length: 34:53
- Labels: EMI (UK); EMI America (US)
- Producers: Nick Rhodes; Colin Thurston; Tim Palmer; Kajagoogoo

Kajagoogoo chronology
White Feathers (1983)	Islands (1984)

Singles from White Feathers
- 1. "Too Shy" Released: 10 January 1983; 2. "Ooh to Be Ah" Released: 21 March 1983; 3. "Hang on Now" Released: 27 May 1983

Professional ratings
Review scores
Source	Rating
Smash Hits	2/10 stars
AllMusic	4/5 stars

White Feathers is the debut studio album by the English new wave band Kajagoogoo, released on 18 April 1983 by EMI Records. The album contains their most successful single, "Too Shy", a UK No. 1 hit in February 1983, as well as two other UK Top 20 hits: "Ooh to Be Ah" and "Hang on Now". It is the band's only album with Limahl as the lead vocalist.

== Background ==
White Feathers was produced by Nick Rhodes, of Duran Duran, and Colin Thurston, who was Duran Duran's producer at the time. The sole exception is the self-titled instrumental track "Kajagoogoo", produced by Tim Palmer and the band. This track song was featured as the opening title song in the 1984 John Hughes movie Sixteen Candles.

After the band was featured on the VH1 program Bands Reunited in 2003, renewed interest in Kajagoogoo prompted the band's original label EMI to re-issue White Feathers on CD in the UK for the first time in 2004 (although it had been available on CD in Japan and the U.S. since 1993). Originally containing 10 tracks, the 2004 version of the album contained eight bonus tracks, including four B-sides and four remixes, two of which are of "Too Shy" (both an extended and instrumental version).

== Track listing ==
All tracks are written by Nick Beggs & Limahl, except where noted.

Side one
No.	Title	Writer(s)	Length
1.	"White Feathers"	Beggs	3:28
2.	"Too Shy"		3:44
3.	"Lies and Promises"		2:51
4.	"Magician Man"	Limahl	3:42
5.	"Kajagoogoo" (Instrumental)	Kajagoogoo	3:10

Side two
No.	Title	Writer(s)	Length
6.	"Ooh to Be Ah"	Limahl	3:14
7.	"Ergonomics"		3:12
8.	"Hang on Now"		3:26
9.	"This Car Is Fast"	Limahl	3:32
10.	"Frayo"	Limahl	4:15
Total length:			34:53

== Personnel ==
Kajagoogoo

- Limahl – lead vocals
- Steve Askew – guitars
- Stuart Neale – keyboards, programming, backing vocals
- Nick Beggs – bass guitar, Chapman stick, backing vocals
- Jez Strode – drums, percussion

Technical

- Colin Thurston – co-producer, engineer
- Nick Rhodes – co-producer
- Tim Palmer – co-producer ("Kajagoogoo"), engineer ("Kajagoogoo")
- Kajagoogoo – co-producer ("Kajagoogoo")
- Shoot That Tiger! – art direction, design
- Ian Hooton – front cover photography
- Eric Watson – liner sheet photography
- Kathy Bryan – mastering

== Charts ==
=== Weekly charts ===
Chart (1983)	Peak position
Australian Albums (Kent Music Report)	53
Austrian Albums (Ö3 Austria)	15
Canada Top Albums/CDs (RPM)	46
Finnish Albums (Suomen virallinen lista)	3
German Albums (Offizielle Top 100)	7
Japanese Western Albums (Oricon)	1
Dutch Albums (Album Top 100)	36
New Zealand Albums (RMNZ)	17
Swedish Albums (Sverigetopplistan)	7
UK Albums (Official Charts)	5
US Billboard 200	38

=== Year-end charts ===
Chart (1983)	Position
German Albums (Offizielle Top 100)	36
