= Big Apple (song) =

1983 single by Kajagoogoo

Single by Kajagoogoo

from the album Islands
- B-side: "Monochromatic (Live)"
- Released: 5 September 1983
- Length: 4:12 (7"); 6:08 (12")
- Label: EMI
- Songwriters: Steve Askew; Nick Beggs; Stuart Neale; Jez Strode
- Producer: Colin Thurston

Kajagoogoo singles chronology
"Hang on Now" (1983)	"Big Apple" (1983)	"The Lion's Mouth" (1984)

Music video
- "Big Apple" on YouTube

"Big Apple" is a song written and performed by the British band Kajagoogoo. Released in September 1983, it was the first single to be taken from the band's second album Islands (1984), and their first song without lead singer Limahl, who had been fired from the band earlier that year. From this single onwards, lead vocals were performed by bassist Nick Beggs.

The song became the group's fourth Top 20 hit in the United Kingdom, peaking at number eight (though was less successful in the United States, where the band are still considered to be a one-hit wonder).

== Track listings ==
7" EMI 5423

1. "Big Apple" – 4:12
2. "Monochromatic" (Live) – 4:12

12" 12EMI 5423

1. "Big Apple" (Metro Mix) – 6:08
2. "Big Apple" (Single Version) – 4:15
3. "Monochromatic" (Live) – 4:12

== Charts ==
Chart (1983)	Peak position
Belgium (Ultratop 50 Flanders)	27
Finland (Suomen virallinen lista)	17
Iceland (RÚV)	1
Ireland (IRMA)	11
Netherlands (Dutch Top 40)	10
Netherlands (Single Top 100)	14
New Zealand (Recorded Music NZ)	31
Switzerland (Schweizer Hitparade)	7
UK Singles (OCC)	8
West Germany (GfK)	13
