= Parallel Galaxy =

1985 studio album by Emmett Chapmen

Studio album by Emmett Chapman
- Released: 1985
- Genre: Jazz, new-age
- Length: 35:36
- Label: Backyard Records

Parallel Galaxy is the first solo album by American musician Emmett Chapman, released in 1985 on Backyard Records. The album is also one of the earliest to feature the Chapman Stick, a stringed instrument developed by Chapman. (Alphonso Johnson and Tony Levin had used a Stick a few years earlier).

This album represented both an example of Chapman's artistry on the Stick, and also showed other musicians what was possible on the Stick. Though not a top-selling album, it inspired many musicians to pick up the Stick.

The track "Back Yard" appears in the Alan Smithee version of the 1984 film Dune.

The entire album was recorded without overdubs. It included Bruce Gary on drums, Josh Hanna on vocal effects and Dan Chapman (Emmett's brother) on harmonica.

Initially released on vinyl, the album was remastered and released on CD in 1999.

== Track listing ==
Side 1

1. "Back Yard"
2. "Margueritas In The Waves"
3. "Eleanor Rigby"
4. "Pumpernickel Pump"
5. "Waltzing Matilda"

Side 2

1. "A Lotus On Irish Streams"
2. "Voices"
3. "My Favorite Things"
4. "Parallel galaxy"
5. "Gypsy"

== Reception ==
A 1999 review of the album's rerelease on CD for All About Jazz described the album as "upbeat and playful", at its best reminiscent of country or bluegrass influenced jazz in the style of Bela Fleck or Les Paul, though somewhat dated and gimmicky: "I find this an interesting listen but if it wasn’t extra-valued as Chapman’s debut Stick release I may have passed on it".
