= Ooh to Be Ah =

1983 single by Kajagoogoo

Single by Kajagoogoo

from the album White Feathers
- B-side: "Animal Instincts" (7") "Interview Rooms" (12")
- Released: 21 March 1983
- Genre: Synth-pop
- Length: 3:33 (7"); 6:38 (12" Construction mix); 3:14 (album version)
- Label: EMI
- Songwriters: Kajagoogoo (music), Limahl (lyrics)
- Producers: Nick Rhodes; Colin Thurston

Kajagoogoo singles chronology
| "Too Shy" (1983) | "Ooh to Be Ah" (1983) | "Hang on Now" (1983) |

Music video
- "Ooh to Be Ah" on YouTube

"Ooh to Be Ah" is a song by the English pop band Kajagoogoo, released on 21 March 1983 as the second single from their debut studio album White Feathers, and was produced by Duran Duran keyboardist Nick Rhodes and producer Colin Thurston. It was the band's second biggest hit, peaking for two weeks at number 7 on the UK singles chart. It was the follow-up single to "Too Shy" and describes the fact that the clothes you wear do not make you famous.

== Critical reception ==
Reviewing the song for Record Mirror, Jim Reid wrote "bearable… just. Kajagoogoo are clearly aiming for the pre-speech market. Imagine the scene. Lots of trendy young mothers have just left Mothercare and are headed for their local record store. Mum enters with baby, and baby is dazzled by all the bright lights and Boy George posters. Baby speaks. "Ga ga goo goo… burp, hic… Oooh ah ah". Mum buys the new Kajagoogoo single. Baby is satisfied. My, what a marketing technique! Next month EMI lauches new band 'Muma Muma'".

Kimblerley Leston for Smash Hits wrote "imagine "Too Shy". Keep all its tricks and twiddles, take away its vital hook and this is what you're left with. A very thin record, indeed, with an almost stunning lack of melody and some really – I mean really – insane lyrics. It'll probably be a monstrous hit but it deserves to flounder".

== Music video ==
The music video was filmed in Regent Street, London, in and around the Café Royal, and features Christopher Timothy and Kenny Everett.

== Track listings ==
7" EMI 5383

1. "Ooh to Be Ah" – 3:33
2. "Animal Instincts" – 2:39

12" 12EMI 5383

1. "Ooh to Be Ah" (The Construction Mix) – 6:38
2. "Ooh to Be Ah" (Single Version) – 3:33
3. Interview Rooms – 3:22

== Charts ==
| Chart (1983) | Peak position |
|---|---|
| Australia (AMR) | 68 |
| Germany (GfK) | 20 |
| Ireland (IRMA) | 7 |
| Israel (IBA) | 6 |
| New Zealand (Recorded Music NZ) | 50 |
| UK Singles (OCC) | 7 |
