= Emmett Chapman =

American jazz musician (1936–2021)

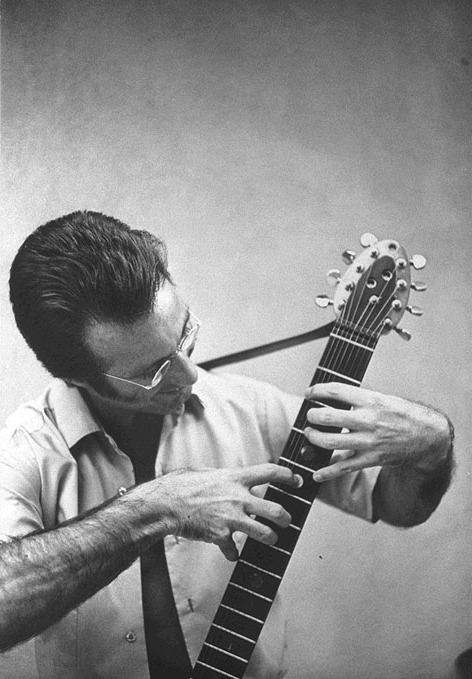
- Chapman in 1969

Background information
- Born: September 28, 1936
- Died: November 1, 2021 (aged 85)
- Genres: Jazz
- Occupation(s): Musician, songwriter, inventor, luthier
- Instrument(s): Chapman stick, guitar
- Years active: 1969–2021

Emmett Chapman (September 28, 1936 – November 1, 2021) was an American jazz musician best known as the inventor of the Chapman Stick and maker of the Chapman Stick family of instruments.

== Career ==
Chapman started his career as a guitarist, recording and performing in the late 1960s. He played with Barney Kessel and Tim Buckley before leading his own band.

In 1969, Chapman modified his homemade nine-string "Freedom Guitar" to accommodate his "Free Hands" tapping method. Although some guitarists had done two-handed tapping with the fingers of the right hand parallel to the strings, Chapman's method used the fingers of both hands perpendicular to the strings. This culminated in the creation of the Electric Stick, which he renamed the Chapman Stick. He founded Stick Enterprises in 1974 and has made more than 6,000 instruments. He held fourteen patents for various aspects of the Chapman Stick. During the 1970s, Chapman toured extensively to promote his music and the instrument.

He was influenced by Barney Kessel, then John McLaughlin.

In 1985, he released a solo album, Parallel Galaxy. The song "Back Yard" was used in the 1984 version of the film Dune. An aesthetically modified Chapman Stick was used as the baliset musical instrument, described in the novel, and is performed by Patrick Stewart in the director's cut of the film.

Chapman died at his home in Woodland Hills, Los Angeles, California, on November 1, 2021, at the age of 85, after a long battle with cancer.
