= Hang on Now =

1983 single by Kajagoogoo

- Cover of the single released in France

Single by Kajagoogoo

from the album White Feathers
- B-side: "Hang on Now (Instrumental)" (7") "Introduction", "Hang on Now" (12")
- Released: May 27, 1983
- Genre: New wave; synth-pop
- Length: 3:25 (7"); 6:19 (12"); 3:26 (album version)
- Label: EMI
- Songwriter: Kajagoogoo
- Producers: Nick Rhodes; Colin Thurston

Kajagoogoo singles chronology
"Ooh to Be Ah" (1983)	"Hang on Now" (1983)	"Big Apple" (1983)

Music video
- "Hang on Now" on YouTube

"Hang on Now" is a song by the English pop band Kajagoogoo from their debut studio album, White Feathers (1983).

The song peaked at No. 13 in the UK and reached No. 78 on the Billboard Hot 100 in the US. This was the band's last single to be released with Limahl on vocals, as he began a solo career the following year. The single was performed on the July 12, 1983 episode of the German TV show Bananas. The music video received light rotation on MTV in 1983.

== Track listing ==
7" EMI 5394 (UK)

1. "Hang on Now" – 3:22
2. "Hang on Now" (Instrumental) – 3:24

12" 12EMI 5394 (UK)

1. "Hang on Now" (Extended Version) – 6:18
2. "Introduction" – 5:10
3. "Hang on Now" – 3:23

7" 1077617 (France)

1. "Hang on Now" (US Mix) – 3:40
2. "Hang on Now" (Instrumental) – 3:24

7" B-8171 (US & Canada)

1. "Hang on Now" – 3:25
2. "Kajagoogoo" (Instrumental) – 3:10
- "Hang on Now" is a remixed version for the US and Canada

== Charts ==
Chart (1983)	Peak position
Finland (Suomen virallinen lista)	14
Germany (GfK)	41
Ireland (IRMA)	10
Japan (Oricon)	58
UK Singles (Official Charts)	13
US Billboard Hot 100	78
