= Nick Beggs =

English bassist

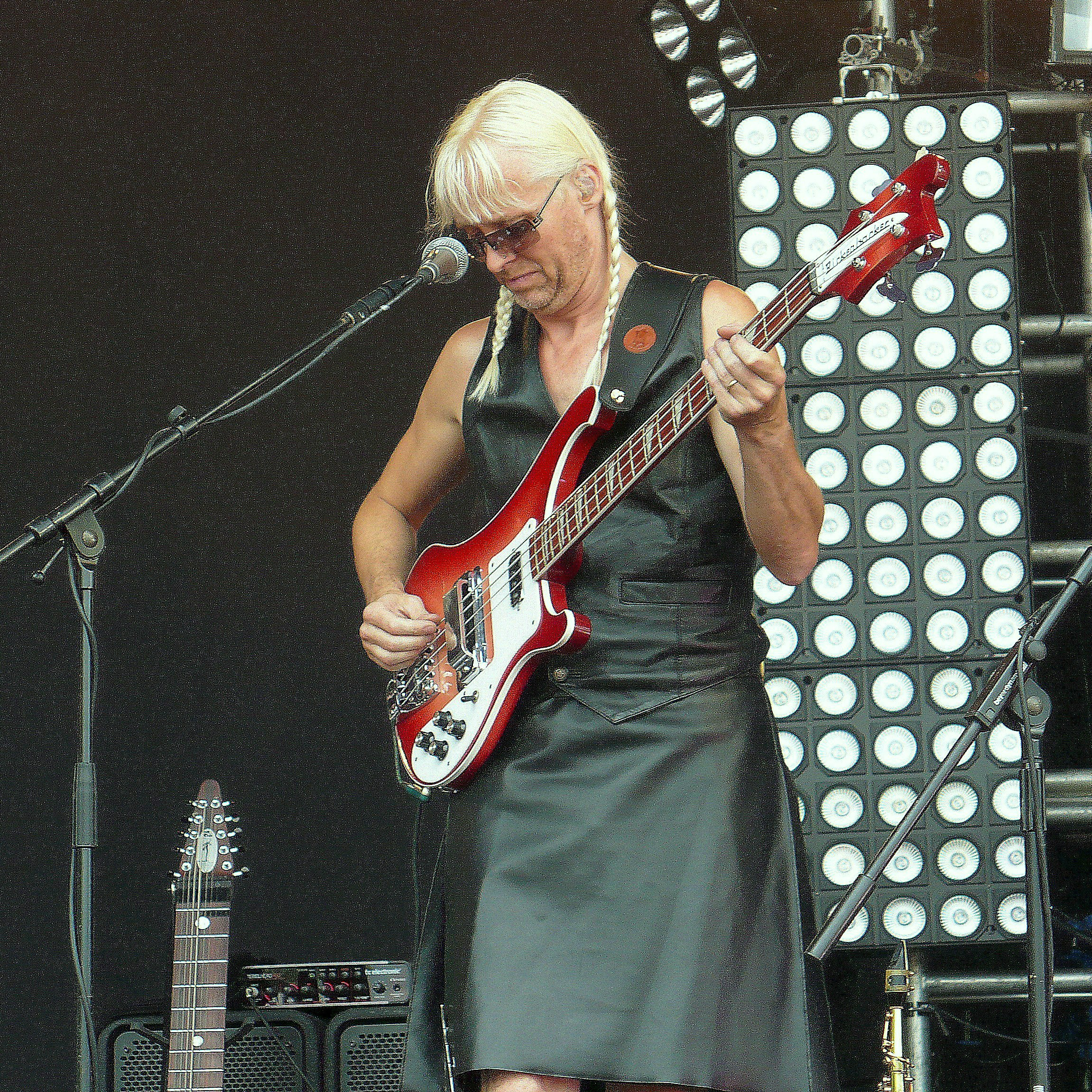
- Beggs in 2010

Background information
- Born: Nicholas Beggs; 15 December 1961 (age 64)
- Origin: Winslow, Buckinghamshire, England
- Genres: Progressive rock; art rock; hard rock; Celtic rock; new wave; pop rock; synth-pop; jazz fusion
- Occupation: Musician
- Instruments: Bass guitar; Chapman Stick; vocals; guitar
- Years active: 1978–present
- Member of: The Mute Gods; Ellis, Beggs & Howard; Trifecta; Steven Wilson band
- Formerly of: Art Nouveau; Steve Hackett band; Iona; Kajagoogoo; Lifesigns
- Website: nickbeggs.co.uk

Nicholas Beggs (born 15 December 1961) is an English musician, noted for playing the bass guitar and the Chapman Stick. He is a founding member of Kajagoogoo and The Mute Gods, formerly also a part of Iona and Ellis, Beggs & Howard and plays in the band of Steven Wilson. He is known for modifying a Chapman Stick into a fully MIDI-capable instrument triggering MIDI from both bass and melody strings; he calls it the Virtual Stick.

== Career ==
Beggs' first band Johnny and the Martians (formed when he was 10) consisted of two friends on trumpet and acoustic guitar and Beggs on drums. He went to Linslade Secondary School in Leighton Buzzard. After attending art school, in 1978 Beggs formed the band Art Nouveau with Steve Askew, Stuart Croxford Neale and Jez Strode. Chris Hamill (Limahl) joined the band in 1981, and at Beggs' suggestion they were renamed Kajagoogoo. The release of the first single "Too Shy" in January 1983 saw the band on a promotional tour as the record reached number 1 on the UK singles chart. The band went on to have four more UK top 40 hits through 1983 and 1984.

After firing lead singer Limahl in 1983 and, following a split with Strode in 1985, the three remaining band members reformed as Kaja, releasing the album Crazy Peoples Right to Speak and the single "Shouldn't Do That".

Between 1985 and 1987, Beggs concentrated on writing with various other songwriters and formed Ellis, Beggs & Howard in March 1987. Ellis, Beggs and Howard split in 1989, and in 1990 Beggs joined the progressive folk band Iona. He recorded two albums with them: The Book of Kells and Beyond These Shores.

He continued working with various artists and bands, including Gary Numan, Alphaville, Belinda Carlisle, Emma Bunton (on her album Life in Mono) and Led Zeppelin's former bass player, John Paul Jones. In 1996, Beggs met Howard Jones on a flight from the United States, and Jones invited Beggs to tour as part of his band.

Beggs worked as a manager for Phonogram Records for eight months. He later became a contributor to various guitar publications, and he is a staff writer for Bass Guitar magazine. He is also a patron of London-based guitar and bass school Guitar-X.

He has recorded and released Stick Insect (2002), The Maverick Helmsman (2004), and The Darkness Inside Mens Hearts.

Around this time Beggs and Askew joined forces with a guitar student of Steve's, Hayley. Together, they worked on the project, Industrial Salt, a guitar-driven girl band fronted by Alex Stamp and Hayley Bonnick. The band released a hit single, "Loop & Loop (under the thunder)" which reached number 3 in the Japanese charts in 2005, and one studio album, A Pocket Full of Magnetic Letters.

Beggs and Askew have also written material for Claudia Mills, a finalist on the talent show Let Me Entertain You.

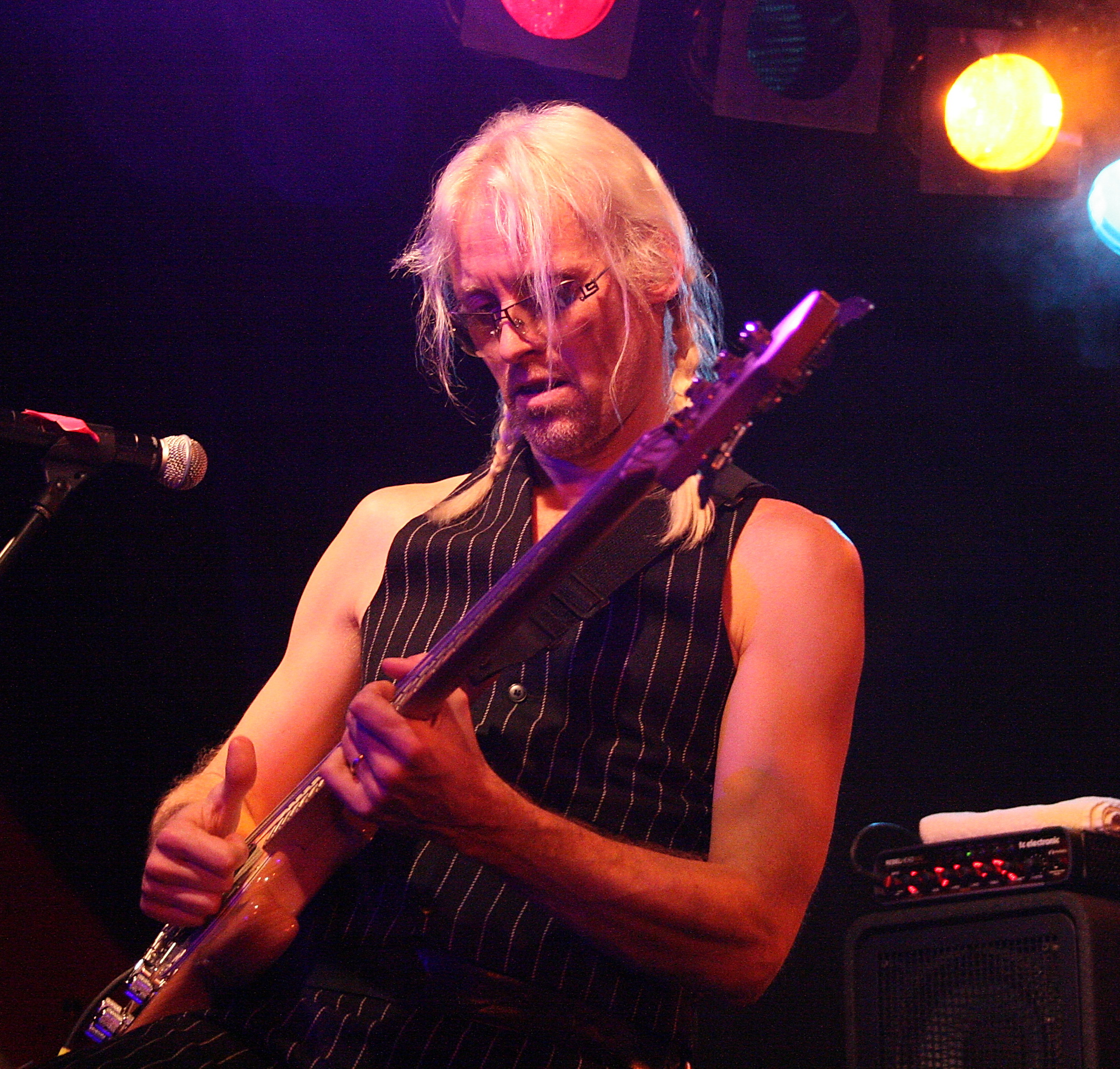
Nick Beggs, Berlin, 14 November 2008

A reformed Kajagoogoo with Beggs, Askew and Croxford Neale toured in 2004. Limahl and Strode both rejoined in 2008, and the band toured extensively. The band released an EP of new material in 2011. In an interview with Cherry Red TV in 2018, Beggs talked about the reunion, stating "we reformed and we toured and we recorded an EP and remastered the back catalogue...and at that point I felt that we had done it all. It was a nice way to tie it up, put a bow on it and leave it alone and move on."

Beggs has been a member of Steven Wilson's touring band since 2011, having also played on Wilson's albums Grace For Drowning, The Raven That Refused to Sing, Hand. Cannot. Erase., the EP 41/2, To the Bone, The Future Bites and The Harmony Codex.

In February 2013, Beggs's project Lifesigns, with John Young and Frosty Beedle, released a self-titled album.

Beggs also became a member of the Belgian prog band Fish on Friday, starting the collaboration with their third album named Godspeed at the end of 2014, marking the starting point of a series of successful albums over a decade: Quiet Life (2017), Black Rain (2020), and 8mm (2023).

He contributed to John Mitchell's solo project Lonely Robot, which released the album Please Come Home in February 2015.

Beggs's latest collaboration is named The Mute Gods, with Marco Minneman and Roger King. Their first album was released in January 2016, titled Do Nothing till You Hear from Me. This was followed up with Tardigrades Will Inherit The Earth in February 2017 and Atheists and Believers in 2019.

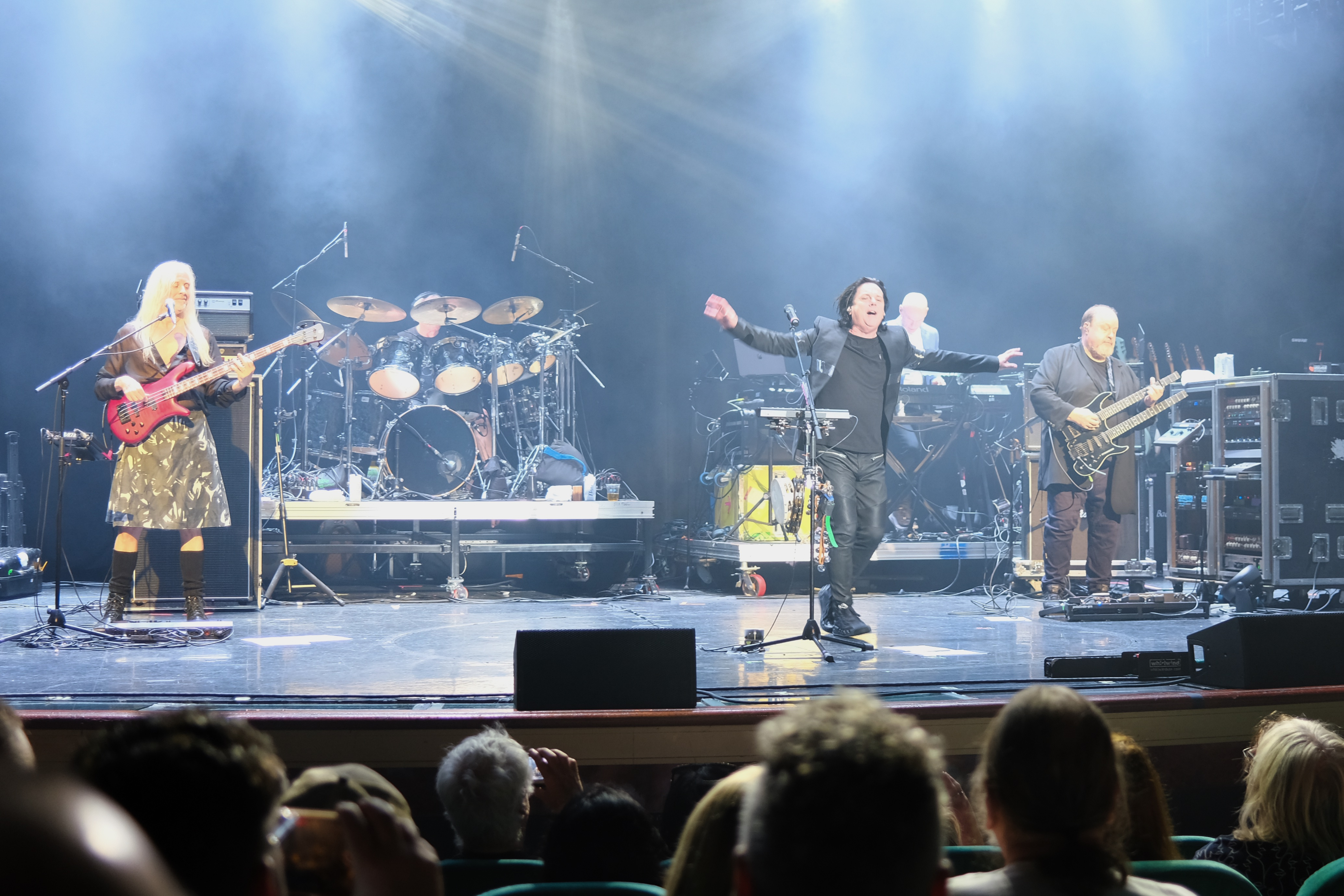
Beggs (left) performing with Marillion in 2024

In 2024, Beggs temporarily replaced bass player Peter Trewavas of Marillion, who was unavailable after a medical procedure.

In 2025, Beggs produced and released the album Walmart, which he made freely available on Bandcamp and YouTube. The album was recorded and freely distributed as gratitude to his fans, who helped him buy back the Bass of Goo, his bass guitar from his early Kajagoogoo days, through a GoFundMe campaign his daughter set up for that purpose. The album name is a pun on the bass's manufacturer, Wal, being their Pro2E model.

== Influences ==
Bass players who influenced Beggs the most are Chris Squire, Jaco Pastorius, Geddy Lee, John Paul Jones, Tony Levin, Percy Jones, Stanley Clarke, Mike Rutherford, Geezer Butler, and Roger Waters.

== Personal life ==
Beggs was a pescetarian for a period of his life. He has been a vegetarian as of January 2016, due to his rejection of the livestock industry.

== Discography ==
=== Kajagoogoo ===
==== Studio albums ====
- White Feathers (1983)
- Islands (1984)
- Crazy Peoples Right to Speak (1985)
- Gone to the Moon (2008)

=== Ellis, Beggs and Howard ===
==== Singles ====
- "Big Bubbles No Troubles" (RCA, 1988) – # 59 UK
- "Bad Times" (RCA, 1988)
- "Where Did Tomorrow Go?" (RCA, 1988)
- "Big Bubbles No Troubles" remix (RCA, 1989) – # 41 UK
- "Big Bubbles No Troubles" remix (RCA, 1989)

==== Albums ====
- Homelands (RCA, 1988)
- The Lost Years Volume One – available from Nick Beggs website
- The Lost Years Volume Two – available from Nick Beggs website as of 2010

=== Lifesigns ===
- Lifesigns (Esoteric Antenna, 2013)

=== Solo ===
==== Albums ====
- Stick Insect (Stick Enterprises, 2002)
- The Maverick Helmsman (Stick Enterprises, 2004)
- The Darkness Inside Mens Hearts (Burning Shed, 2014) – a compilation of the solo Chapman Stick pieces from his albums Stick Insect (2002) and The Maverick Helmsman (2004)
- Words Fail Me (Cherry Red, 2019)
- Walmart (2025)

=== With other artists ===
With Rockets

- Another Future (1992)

With John Paul Jones

- The Thunderthief (2001)

With Steve Hackett

- Out of the Tunnel's Mouth (2009)
- Beyond the Shrouded Horizon (2011)
- Live Rails (2011)
- Genesis Revisited II (2012)
- Wolflight (2015)

With Steven Wilson

- Grace For Drowning (2011)
- Catalog / Preserve / Amass (live) (2012)
- Get All You Deserve (live) (2012)
- The Raven that Refused to Sing (2013)
- Drive Home (2013)
- Hand. Cannot. Erase. (2015)
- 4½ (2016)
- To the Bone (2017)
- Home Invasion: In Concert at the Royal Albert Hall (2018)
- The Future Bites (2021)
- The Harmony Codex (2023)

With Fish on Friday

- Godspeed (2014)
- Quiet Life (2017)
- Black Rain (2020)
- 8mm (2023)

With Lonely Robot (i.e. John Mitchell)

- Please Come Home (2015)

With The Mute Gods

- Do Nothing till You Hear from Me (2016)
- Tardigrades Will Inherit the Earth (2017)
- Atheists and Believers (2019)

With Trifecta

- Fragments (2021)
- The New Normal (2024)
