= Chapman Stick =

Stringed instrument of the guitar family

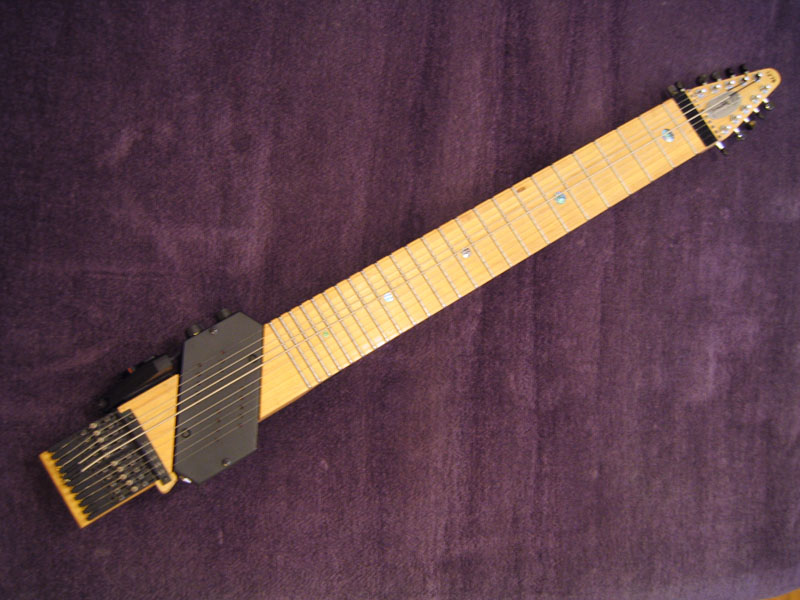
- Ten-stringed Chapman Stick

String instrument
- Classification: String
- Hornbostel–Sachs classification: 321.322 (Composite chordophone)
- Inventor: Emmett Chapman
- Developed: 1970s

Playing range
- (B♭_{0}) C_{1}–C_{6} (D_{6}); The 36" scale-length standard-sized Chapman Stick in Matched Reciprocal tuning can play from C_{1}–C_{6}. Alternative tunings can extend the range both up and down. by 2 semitones to B♭_{0}-D_{6}

Related instruments
- Warr Guitar; Touch guitar; Megatar

The Chapman Stick is an electric musical instrument devised by Emmett Chapman in the early 1970s. A member of the guitar family, the Chapman Stick usually has 10 or 12 individually tuned strings and is used to play bass lines, melody lines, chords, or textures. Designed as a fully polyphonic chordal instrument, it can also cover several of these musical parts simultaneously.

The Stick is available with passive or active pickup modules that are plugged into a separate instrument amplifier. With a special synthesizer pickup, it can be used to trigger synthesizers and send MIDI messages to electronic instruments.

== Description and playing position ==
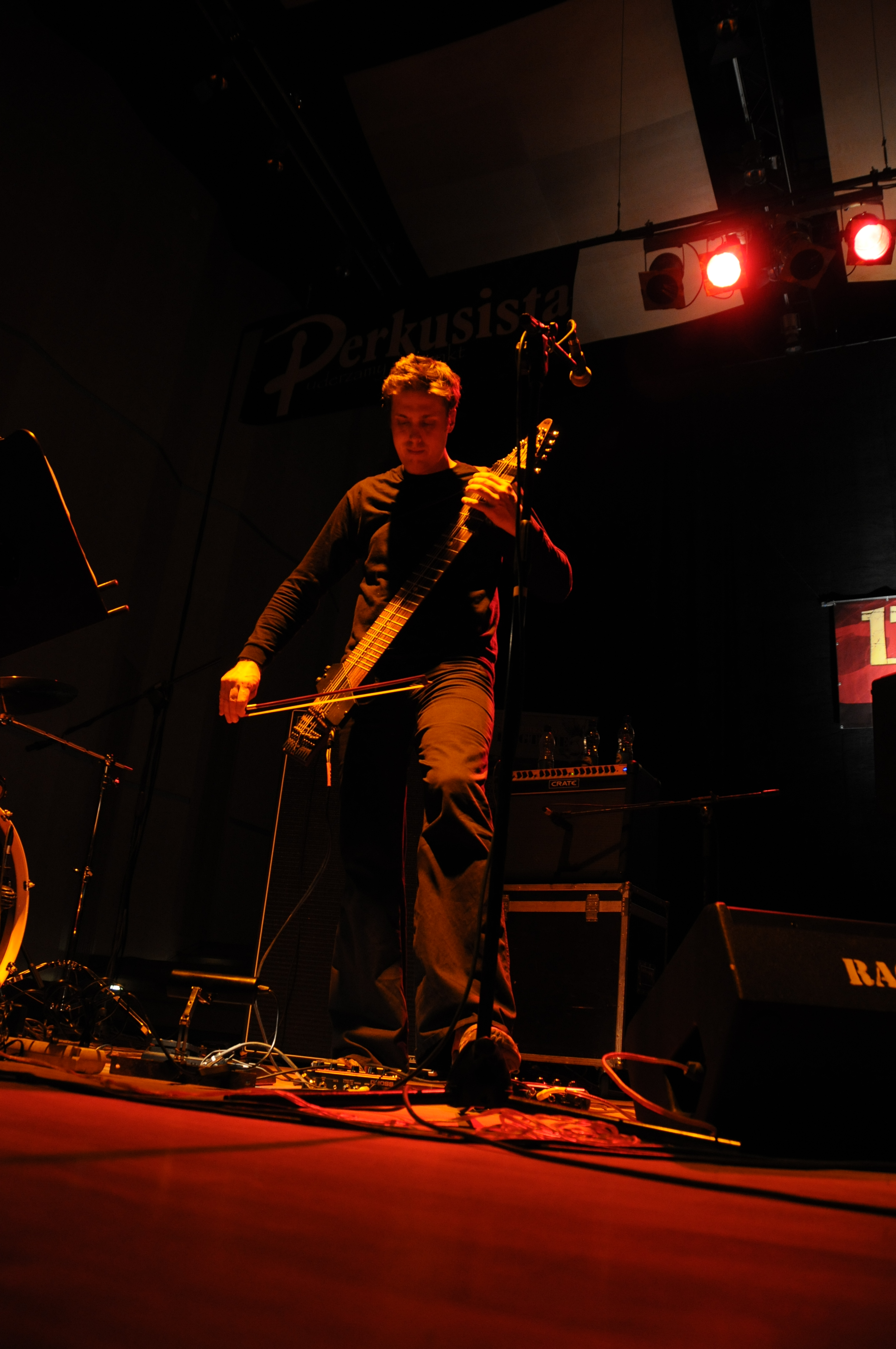
A musician bowing the Stick

Imagine creating music on a stringed instrument that is simultaneously a guitar, a bass, a piano, and percussion. Add unlimited electronic capabilities and forward-thinking playing techniques for ultimate expression. Now, design a tuning to make navigation of the instrument amazingly simple, and streamline the look and feel for optimal accessibility. This instrument already exists as the Chapman Stick.

— Steve Adelson describing the Chapman Stick in Guitar Player magazine

A Stick physically resembles the fretboard of an electric guitar. It is, however, considerably longer and wider and is strung with 8, 10, or 12 strings. While the electric guitar is usually played by strumming or plucking the strings, the Chapman stick is usually played by tapping or fretting the strings. Instead of one hand fretting and the other plucking, as is typical with the guitar, the Chapman stick player uses both hands to sound notes by striking the strings against the fingerboard "behind" (in guitar parlance, this means a short distance towards the tuning machines) or on the appropriate frets for the desired notes. For this reason, the Chapman stick can sound many more notes at once than some other stringed instruments, making it more comparable to a keyboard instrument in terms of polyphony. This arrangement lends itself to playing many lines at once, and many Stick players have mastered performing bass, chords, and melody lines simultaneously.

Typically, the Chapman Stick is held via a belt-hook and a shoulder strap. The player hooks the instrument onto the belt and places the head and dominant arm through the shoulder strap. The instrument then settles into a position approximately 30 to 40 degrees from vertical, which allows both of the player's hands to naturally and comfortably address the fretboard. The player then hammers onto the strings with the fingertips in the same way that one would strike a piano key. The technique is very similar to that of the piano inasmuch as the player covers both bass and melody notes together with both hands, and each note is struck with one finger of one hand. Typically, one hand plays the melody on the treble strings and the other plays rhythm on the bass strings.

A seated playing position (which keeps the Stick in a similar playing position relative to the player as the standing position) is also popular, wherein a cross-member is laid upon the knees of the seated player and the stick's belthook rests upon the crossmember.

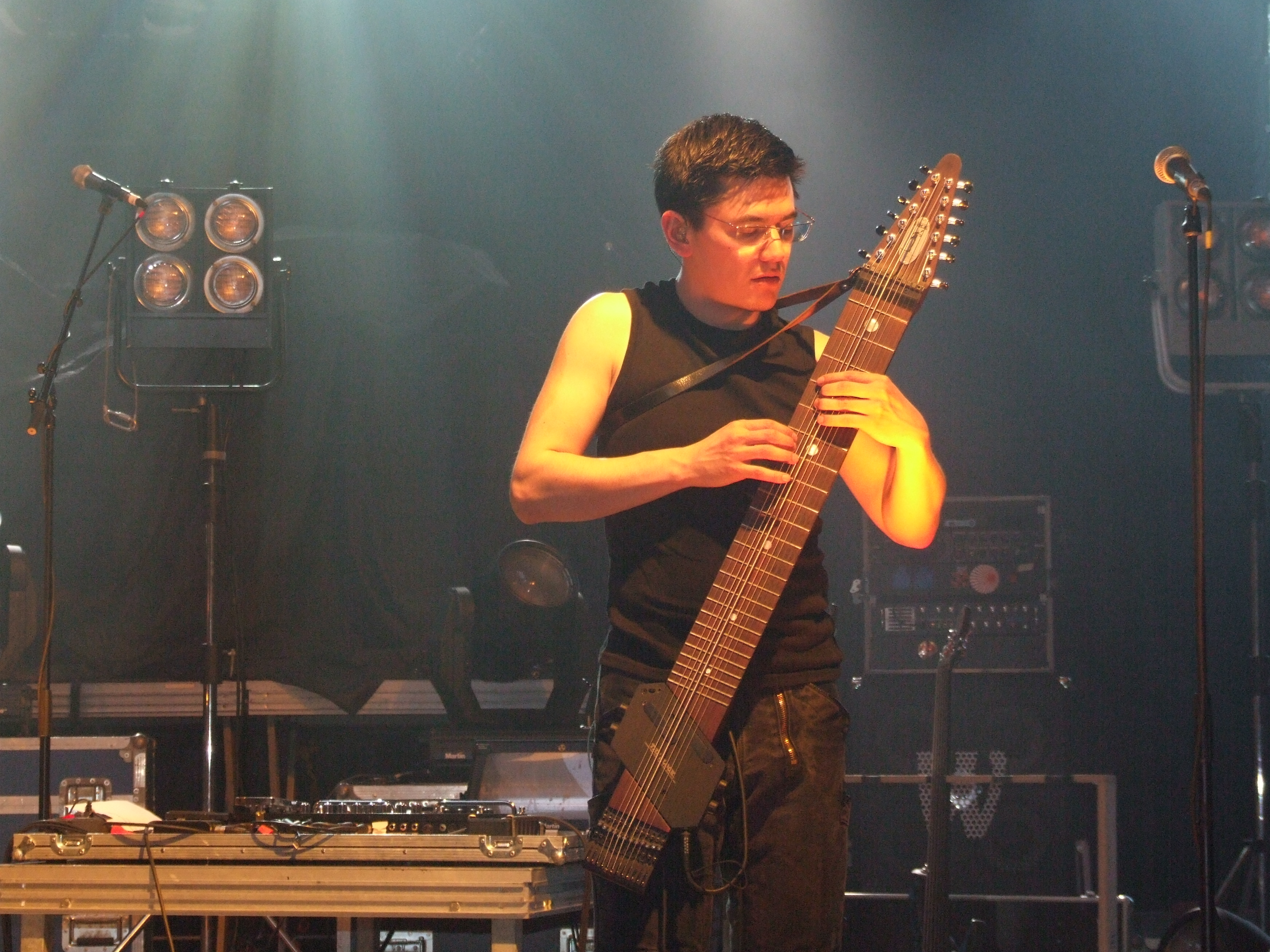
Saltatio Mortis bandmember Bruder Frank

A street musician in Japan playing a Chapman Stick in 2023

== History ==
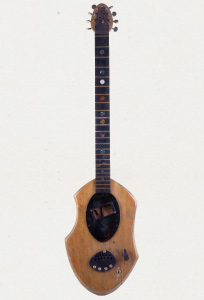
The first Stick prototype

In 1969, jazz guitarist Emmett Chapman developed the two-handed tapping technique (in which both hands play parallel to the frets) and applied it to his playing. At the time, Chapman was playing a 9-string long-scale guitar, but decided to develop a new instrument for use with "free hands" to use the method's full potential. After being introduced to Tim Buckley by Lee Underwood, Chapman played the new instrument around Southern California at live performances with Buckley's third Starsailor band in early 1972, finding out what worked and what needed changing. Chapman's experimentation suited Buckley's improvisational exploration of musical boundaries, dissonance, and rhythm. However, Chapman never recorded with Buckley.

The Chapman Stick took five years to develop, during which Chapman also opted to set up a business to sell it. The first production model of the Stick was launched in 1974. On October 10 of the same year, Chapman brought his instrument to public attention by demonstrating it on the game show What's My Line?

Former Weather Report bassist Alphonso Johnson was among the first musicians to introduce the Chapman Stick to the public. Session player Tony Levin was also an early user and was playing the instrument from the mid-1970s: he would bring it to sessions and tours with Peter Gabriel and featured it in his work as a member of King Crimson from 1981 onwards. He would also use it with Liquid Tension Experiment and in sessions for bands including Pink Floyd and Yes. Levin formed the band Stick Men, consisting of one drummer and two Stick players. When bassist Trey Gunn joined King Crimson in 1994, the six-member band was able to interact musically in a number of ways, including as a double trio, with two drummers, two electric guitarists, and two Stick players: Levin and Gunn.

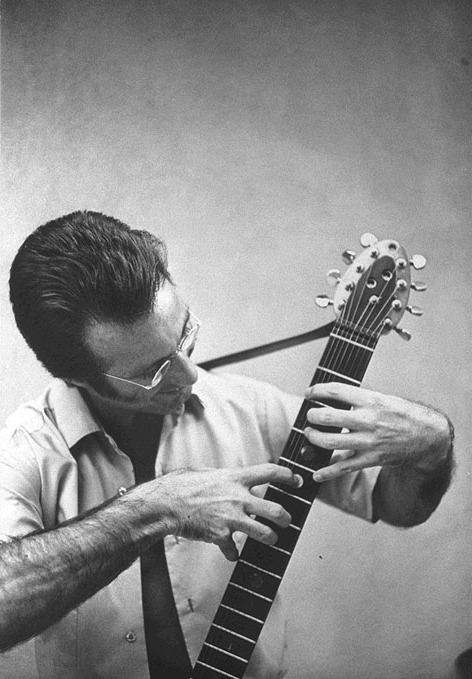
Emmett Chapman playing an early Stick in 1969

Recordings that have been influential on Stick players, because of the prominent role the Stick plays, include the 1981 King Crimson album Discipline (played by Tony Levin) and Emmett Chapman's own album Parallel Galaxy. The British pop trio Ellis, Beggs & Howard scored a top 50 UK single in 1988 with "Big Bubbles, No Troubles", built on a Stick riff played by Nick Beggs.

== Technical details ==
=== Construction ===
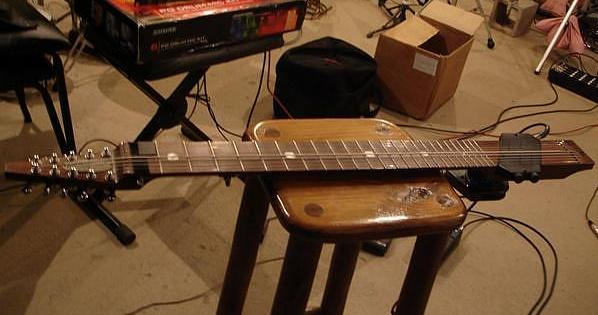
Brazilian pau ferro (ironwood) Stick manufactured in the 1980s

Chapman Sticks have been made from many materials. The first were made from hardwoods, most from ironwood, but some from ebony and other exotic woods, until the early 1980s. The next group was made from an injection-molded polycarbonate resin through 1989. These were followed by one-piece hardwood structures with an adjustable truss rod, and for a time from 2001 to the mid-to-late 2000s (although not currently available), the "Stick XG" (Extended Graphite) was made of structural graphite, continuous strand carbon fiber. Today, they are made from laminated hardwoods (including padauk, Indian rosewood, tarara, maple, wenge, and mahogany), and laminated bamboo, as well as graphite.

In contrast to the guitar or bass, the Stick is set up with very little relief in the fretboard. It is very flat compared to a guitar, which has a slight bow. Combined with a long scale length, stainless steel pyramidal fret rails, very low string action, and very sensitive pickups, this setup is advantageous to the tapping style of play. The rear surface of the instrument is not curved like a guitar neck, but has deep-beveled edges (also a design trademark of the Stick).

=== Tuning ===
The original tuning, developed by Emmett Chapman, is now called "classic" by the instrument's players. It consists of five bass strings (six on the Grand Sticks) and five or six melody strings. Bass and melody strings both start with low-pitched strings in the middle and become higher in pitch towards the edge of the fretboard. The bass strings are tuned in all-fifths tuning, while the melody strings are tuned in all-fourths tuning.

However, the hardware is fully adjustable to accommodate any gauge string at any position, allowing many possible tunings or string configurations. On the 36"-scale instrument, notes can range from low C (above B on a 5-string bass) to high D (a whole step below the high E string on guitar). On the two guitar-scale models (Alto Stick and Stick Guitar), the notes range from F below guitar low E to F# above guitar high E.

Tuning configurations may change depending on the player's style: a player playing as a lead instrument will choose an overall higher pitch tuning, with more separation or overlap between the melody and bass courses.

The stringing/tuning configuration of the Chapman Stick is advantageous to the player who wishes to play large, fully voiced chords with close inner-note relationships. When the hands are held in any given position, the Chapman Stick has a much wider range of notes and chords available, compared to a standard guitar.

The classic tuning shows another advantage as well: The regular tunings in fourths and fifths remain consistent in each of the two parts of the instrument; regular tunings facilitate learning by beginners, as well as transposition and improvisation by advanced players. Also, the bass/melody division allows microtonal tunings.

The manufacturer's website has more detailed information on tunings.

=== Notation ===
A short passage of music for the Chapman Stick, written in StaffTab

Music for the Chapman Stick is written on a grand staff, as for the piano, but one octave higher than it sounds. This transposition reduces the number of ledger lines needed in the bass register. Developed by Emmett Chapman and Greg Howard to incorporate fingerings into the sheet music, the system is called StaffTab, which they have trademarked. Although the name alludes to tablature, which is normally written separately from or parallel to a piece's pitch and rhythm, StaffTab is embedded within the sheet music itself. As on the piano, the upper staff is normally played with the right hand and the lower staff with the left hand.

For each note, the notation can convey three additional pieces of fingering information: which finger to use, on which fret to stop, and which string to play.

The finger is encoded in the shape of the notehead. A circle indicates the index finger, a diamond the middle finger, a triangle the ring finger, and a square the little finger.

The fret, counted from the nut, is written as a number above the upper staff or below the lower staff. Instruments with a 34-inch (86 cm) scale length have 24 frets, numbered 1 to 24, whereas those with a 36-inch (91 cm) scale length add a lower fret, between the nut and the first fret, which is labeled "X". When several notes are stopped at once, their fret numbers are combined into a single annotation, listed from the topmost note to the bottommost and separated by periods. For example, three simultaneous notes stopped at the twelfth, tenth, and thirteenth frets are annotated "12.10.13".

The line indicators in StaffTab notation tell the player which string to play the notes on, with each string on the instrument corresponding to a staff line or ledger line.

The string is shown by its position on the staff: the ten lines of the grand staff correspond to the ten strings of the instrument. The lowest line of the lower staff represents the highest bass string, and the highest line of the upper staff represents the highest melody string. On twelve-string instruments, the ten lines represent only the inner five strings of each side, and the two outermost strings are notated on the first ledger line—above the upper staff for the melody string and below the lower staff for the bass string. An outlined rectangle is placed on the line of the string to be played. When more than one string is played simultaneously, the string indicators are offset slightly to either side of the note, so as to reproduce the physical shape of the chord on the fretboard, with strings stopped at lower frets offset to the left and those at higher frets to the right.

=== Electronics ===
The Stick is available with passive or active pickup modules. Customized Roland GK-3 pickups are available for the treble or bass side of the instrument, allowing the instrument to trigger or control one or two guitar synthesizers such as the Roland GR-20 or Axon AX-100, and also to drive other MIDI instruments or sequencers chained to the guitar synthesizer. The hammer-on style of playing produces a rising waveform transient that is easily tracked by this type of device.

Standard output is two-channel, through a TRS 1/4" phone connector, with bass and melody courses output separately. There are separate volume controls for bass and melody. The ACTV-2 and PASV-4 pickup modules also have mono operation modes.

The Stick can be plugged into any standard guitar amp or bass amplifier, to good effect. However, because of the very high impedance of the passive pickups, an instrument preamp is often employed, especially for full-range amplification systems (PA system, keyboard amps, etc.).

British musician Nick Beggs uses a Grand Stick, fully MIDI-capable of triggering from both bass and melody strings. He has named this modified instrument the "Virtual Stick".

=== Models ===
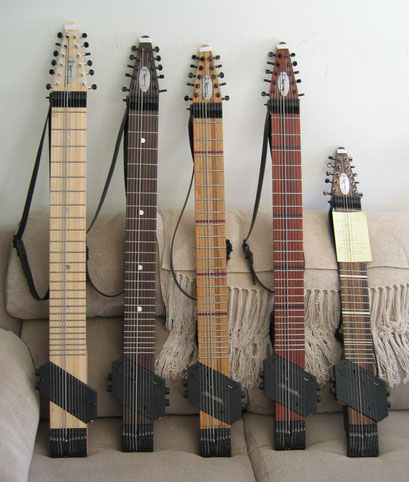
A variety of Sticks

There are eight models of the Chapman Stick. Some string configurations are mentioned below, but current production models offer any tuning within physical limitations of stringing:

Chapman Stick models
Model	Strings	Standard bass/melody split	Alternative bass/melody splits	Scale length	Description
Stick	10	5/5	4/6	36" (older production models were 34".)	
Railboard	10	5/5		34"	a one-piece CNC-cut thru-neck aluminum beam with nine pieces bolted on, including headstock, bridge, new R-Block pickup module
Grand Stick 10	10	5/5	4/6	36" (older production models were 34".)	ten strings installed on a wooden or laminated bamboo "blanks" for the Grand Stick 12-string model, thus creating a wider fretboard and string spacing for a ten-string Stick. Center-to-center string spacing is 0.350", as opposed to 0.315" on standard ten-string Sticks. The space between the "melody" and "bass" groups of strings is also wider, at 0.500" instead of the standard 0.430".
Grand Stick 12	12	6/6	5/7	36"	
Stick Bass (SB8)	8			36" (older production models were 34".)	undivided "straight 4ths" B-Bb bass guitar or B-A electric guitar intervals tuning
NS/Stick	8			34"	set up for plucking, strumming, or tapping in standard bass or guitar intervals, standard Stick five melody and five bass, other custom tunings and setups; co-invented by Chapman and Ned Steinberger.
Alto Stick	10	5/5		26.5"	shorter scale length for a more guitar-like range
Stick Guitar	12	6/6		26.5"	shorter scale length for a more guitar-like range

Stick Enterprises has also manufactured some custom and limited-run instruments:

- SB7 Stick Bass – Original "Stick Bass" model with string-spacing close to the current 10-string Chapman Stick, which is narrower than the SB8 8-string Stick Bass. 2 Bartolini bass pickups (1 "Soapbar" & 1 "Single Coil"-sized: only 1 selectable at a time) with mono-only output as opposed to virtually all the previously built and current to the original & upgraded over time passive "Stickup", newer active EMG "ACTV-2" Block, passive Villex "PASV-4" and "R-Block" railboard pickup modules, all of which have stereo-or-mono output. Only one production run completed in 1996–97 until replaced by the more Stick-like SB8 in March 1998. Only one Production Run of this particular Stick model was built before being replaced by the SB8 Stick Bass.
- The Acoustick – an acoustic version of the Chapman Stick made for Bob Culbertson.
- StickXBL – A prototype Stick with body construction by BassLab using a hollow "tunable composite" material. Only a small number of these prototypes exist.

== List of notable players and ensembles ==
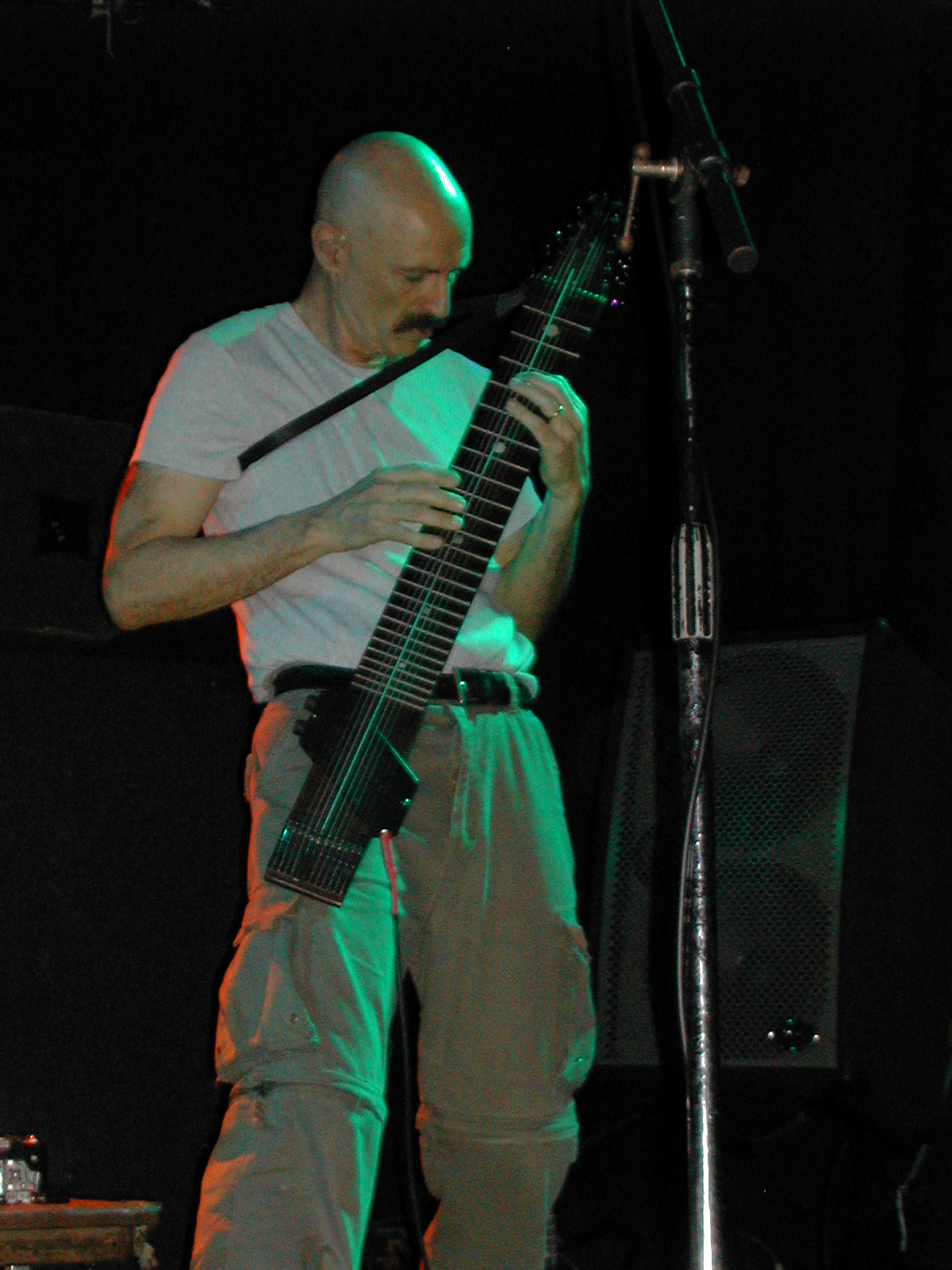
Tony Levin live at Toad's Place

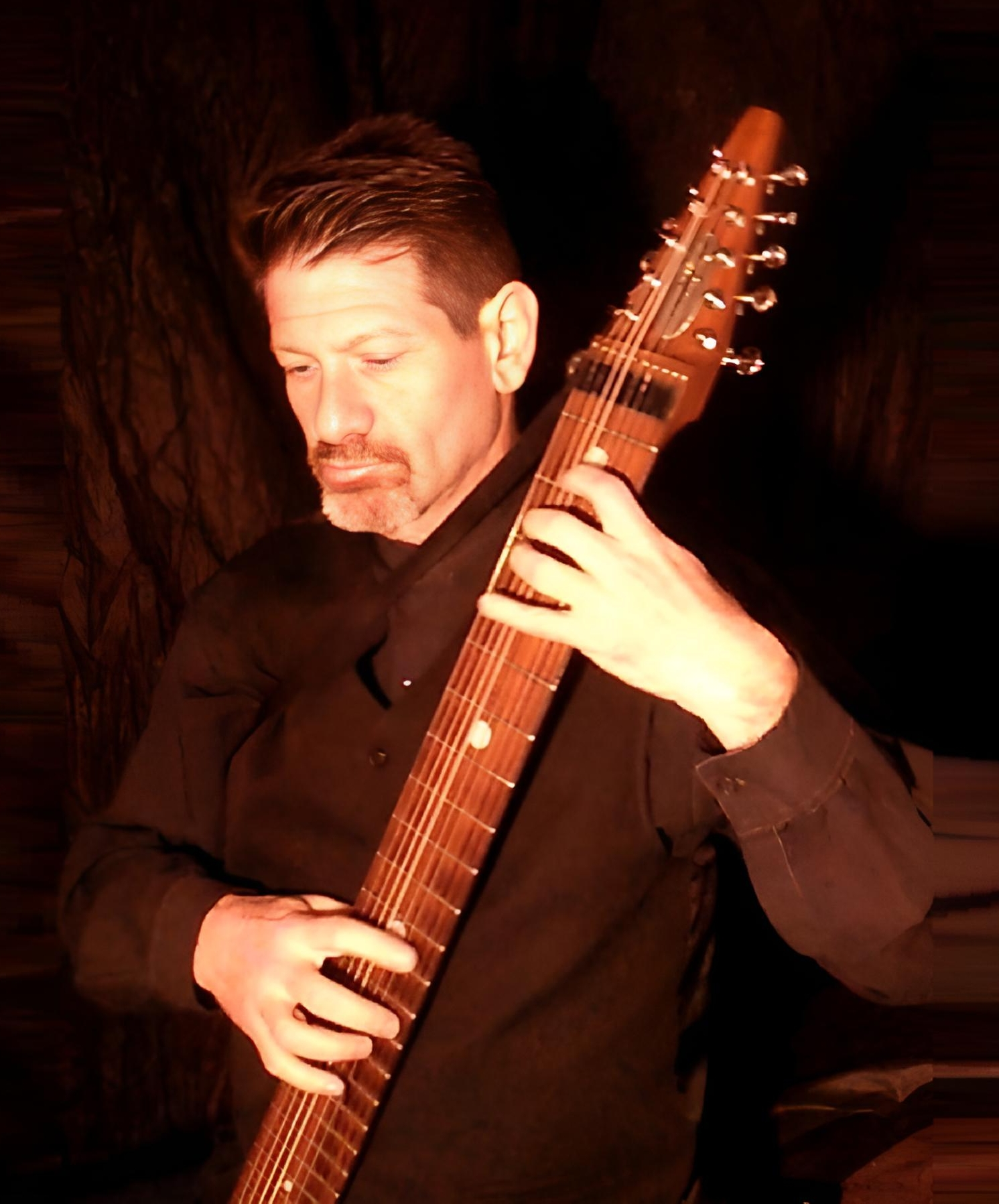
Diego Souto playing an Ironwood Stick built in 1982

- Carlos Alonso of Glueleg
- Jeff Ament of Pearl Jam
- John Balance of Coil and Current 93
- Nick Beggs (Kajagoogoo, Ellis, Beggs & Howard, John Paul Jones, Nik Kershaw, Howard Jones, Iona, Steve Hackett, Steven Wilson, Lifesigns)
- Blue Man Group
- Zeta Bosio of Soda Stereo
- Brian Bourne
- Shiori Sekine as a member of Stico
- Terry Burrows author and musician
- Emmett Chapman inventor of the Chapman Stick Touchboard and the Free Hands Two-Handed Tapping Technique
- Guillermo Cides solo Stick performer
- Peter Gifford plays Chapman Stick on the tracks "Sleep" and "Who Can Stand in the Way" on the Midnight Oil album Red Sails in the Sunset and in concert
- Trey Gunn played Chapman Stick with Robert Fripp, David Sylvian, Sunday All Over the World, King Crimson and UKZ
- Paige Haley of Orgy
- Greg Howard solo and on the Dave Matthews Band album Before These Crowded Streets
- Alphonso Johnson with Weather Report, Santana, Gregg Rolie Band
- Tony Levin solo and with Peter Gabriel, King Crimson, Yes, Anderson Bruford Wakeman Howe (notably on live renditions of "Close to the Edge"), Pink Floyd, Stick Men, and Liquid Tension Experiment
- Sean Malone of Cynic and Gordian Knot
- Mark McCullough with Red Wanting Blue
- John Myung of Dream Theater and Gordian Knot
- Mike Oldfield plays Chapman Stick on his album The Songs of Distant Earth (and in some multimedia video clips on the extended CD) (although Oldfield plays with pick as opposed to two-hand technique)
- Pino Palladino on Paul Young's No Parlez
- Jeff Pearce solo and in concert with William Ackerman
- Don Schiff solo and with Lana Lane and Rocket Scientists
- Akın Ünver, solo Stick player from Ankara, Turkey
- Fariz RM

== See also ==
- Left-handed tunings, which are called "inverse tunings" in the Chapman Stick community
