= I Can See Your Voice (Dutch game show) season 1 =

Television game show season

I Can See Your Voice
- Season 1
- Starring: Marieke Elsinga; Ronnie Flex; Samantha Steenwijk; Jeroen van Koningsbrugge; Fred van Leer
- Hosted by: Carlo Boszhard
- Winners: Good singers: 6; Bad singers: 2
- No. of episodes: 8

Release
- Original network: RTL 4
- Original release: 29 October – 17 December 2020

Season chronology
- Next → Season 2

The first season of the Dutch television mystery music game show I Can See Your Voice was originally scheduled to premiere on RTL 4 on 8 May 2020, but it was pushed back later to 29 October 2020.

At the time of filming during the COVID-19 pandemic, health and safety protocols are also implemented.

== Gameplay ==
=== Format ===
According to the original South Korean rules, the guest artist and contestant must attempt to eliminate bad singers during its game phase. At the final performance, the last remaining mystery singer is revealed as either good or bad by means of a duet between them and one of the guest artists.

If the last remaining mystery singer is good, the contestant wins €5,000; this is also applied to the winning bad singer selected by them.

=== Rounds ===
1. First impression (Dutch: Eerste indruk)
  The guest artist and contestant are given some time to observe and examine each mystery singer based on their appearance.
2. Lip sync (Dutch: Lipsynchronisatie)
  Each mystery singer performs a lip sync to a song; good singers mime to a recording of their own, while bad singers mime to a backing track by another vocalist.
3. Witness (Dutch: Bewijs)
  The guest artist and contestant are presented with a video package containing possible clues by one of the mystery singers.
4. Interrogation (Dutch: De ondervraging)
  The guest artist and contestant may ask questions to the remaining mystery singers. Good singers are required to give truthful responses, while the bad singers must lie.

== Episodes ==
=== Guest artists ===
Legend:
Good singer
Bad singer
— The contestants won the money.
— The winning bad singer stole the money.

Episode		Guest artist (Note: Players' notes: For the returning guest artists (who also include foreigners and former good singers), names are displayed in italics.; For the mixed groups, names who identified as bad singers are displayed in italics.)	Contestant	Mystery singers (In their respective numbers and aliases)					
#	Date	Guest artist	Contestant	Elimination order					Winner
#	Date	Guest artist	Contestant	First impression	Lip sync	Witness		Interrogation	Winner
1	29 October 2020	OG3NE	Anneke → €5,000	2. Kizzy Getrouw; (American Dream)	3. Mishaela Getrouw; (Dream Sister)	5. Marieke Visser; (Happy Crocheter)	1. René van den Berg; (Man of Stones)	6. Robin Boorneman; (Travelling Rocker)	4. Bart van Dishoeck; Vibrant Brabander
2	5 November 2020	Edsilia Rombley	Valerie → €5,000	1. Soraya Desouza; (Poppy Skater)	6. Miguel Martins; (Meditation Guru)	2. Jens Broes; (Musical Man)	3. Cerezio Krind; (Singing Chef)	4. Mieke Hendriks; (Business Belter)	5. Ilysha Prade; Gospel Goddess
3	12 November 2020	Danny de Munk	Demi → €0	1. Jefferson da Veiga; (King of R&B)	3. Justin Keizer; (K-pop Kid)	6. Jesse Ludolphy; (Groningen's Street Performer)	2. Nadine Pruim; (Relaxing Rock Chick)	4. Nick Jefferson; (Party Planner)	5. Mercy Aquaa; Soul Sister
4	19 November 2020	Trijntje Oosterhuis	Nicky Roeg → €5,000	3. Jaimy Joyce; (Influencer)	2. Luke de Cort; (Smart Student)	4. Daveson Ignatia; (Cool Comedian)	6. Iris Smits; (Pitch Perfect Powergirl)	1. Lien Haegeman; (Opera Vinologist)	5. Vicky Mirage; Queen of Drag
5	26 November 2020	Gerard Joling	Melvin → €5,000	3. Marlijn van Dijk; (Musical Girl)	4. Bengt Rangé; (Dirty Dancer)	1. Laurie van Tongeren; (DJ Diva)	2. Pierre Masisi; (Legalicious)	5. Jael Abarca; (Spicy Latina)	6. Daniel Marin; Green Guy
6	3 December 2020	Dave von Raven	Viola → €0	6. Tim Geutjes; (Singing Coach)	4. Amber van Opijnen; (Wedding Singer)	1. Romi Hurts; (The Jazzy Voice)	3. Tim van Broekhuizen; (Trobadour)	5. Alexander Broussard; (Pianoman)	2. Rachaila Isenia; Miss Hula Hoop
7	10 December 2020	Romy Monteiro	Lars → €5,000	2. Luc Brugman; (Funky Pizzaboy)	4. Mandy Nijboer; (Pregnant Handyman)	6. Britt van Asperdt; (Sassy Cleaner)	3. Lennon Kors; (Bling Bling Barista)	1. Ilse Bevelander; (Tina Trassie)	5. Adrian Stephan; Spiritual Cruise Singer
8	17 December 2020	Emma Heesters	Sabrina → €5,000	5. Melvin Dalati; (Fashion Blogger)	3. Franklin Beuk; (Motown Classic)	6. Alina Brouwer; (Señorita Cubanita)	4. Sharon Sala; (Showgirl)	2. Anna Bron; (Farm Girl)	1. Eveline Armina Haverlag; Camera Chick

=== Panelists ===
Legend:
Regular panelist
Guest panelist

Apps		Panelists in attendance (Sorted by first appearance, with episode designations)
g#	p#	Panelists in attendance (Sorted by first appearance, with episode designations)
8	4	Marieke Elsinga, Samantha Steenwijk, Jeroen van Koningsbrugge, and Fred van Leer (1–8)
6	1	Ronnie Flex (1, 4–8)
2	1	Najib Amhali (2–3)

== Reception ==
Legend:
Highest rated episode
Lowest rated episode

No.	Title	Air date	Timeslot (CET)	Points			Viewership			Ref(s)
No.	Title	Air date	Timeslot (CET)	Rank	Density	Share	Live	VOSDAL	Total	Ref(s)
1	"O'G3NE"	29 October 2020	Thursday, 20:30	7	7.5	15.8%	1.194	1.144	2.338	
2	"Edsilia Rombley"	5 November 2020	Thursday, 20:30	6	8	17.5%	1.283	1.001	2.284	
3	"Danny de Munk"	12 November 2020	Thursday, 20:30	5	9	20.1%	1.433	1.035	2.468	
4	"Trijntje Oosterhuis"	19 November 2020	Thursday, 20:30	4	8.6	20.2%	1.382	0.944	2.326	
5	"Gerard Joling"	26 November 2020	Thursday, 20:30	2	9.3	23%	1.492	0.922	2.414	
6	"Dave von Raven"	3 December 2020	Thursday, 20:30	2	8.9	21.9%	1.416	0.871	2.287	
7	"Romy Monteiro"	10 December 2020	Thursday, 20:30	4	8.1	20%	1.291	0.836	2.127	
8	"Emma Heesters"	17 December 2020	Thursday, 20:30	3	9.3	21.3%	1.485	0.865	2.35	

Source: Stichting KijkOnderzoek
