= I Can See Your Voice (Dutch game show) season 5 =

Television game show season

I Can See Your Voice
- Season 5
- Starring: Danny de Munk; Marieke Elsinga; Fred van Leer
- Hosted by: Carlo Boszhard
- Winners: Good singers: 2; Bad singers: 2
- No. of episodes: 8

Release
- Original network: RTL 4
- Original release: 19 October – 7 December 2023

Season chronology
- ← Previous; Season 4

The fifth season of the Dutch television mystery music game show I Can See Your Voice was originally scheduled to premiere on RTL 4 on 31 August 2023, but it was pushed back later to 19 October 2023.

== Gameplay ==
=== Format ===
According to the original South Korean rules, the guest artist and contestant(s) must attempt to eliminate bad singers during its game phase. At the final performance, the last remaining mystery singer is revealed as either good or bad by means of a duet between them and one of the guest artists. (Note: Gameplay note: The number of contestants are set to one (for the rest of episodes) or a group of two (for 4 episodes).)

The contestant(s) must eliminate one mystery singer at the end of each round, receiving €1,000 if they eliminate a bad singer. At the end of a game, if the contestant(s) decide to walk away, they will keep the money had won in previous rounds; if they decide to risk for the last remaining mystery singer, they win €7,500 if a singer is good, or lose their all winnings if a singer is bad.

=== Rounds ===
1. TBA (Dutch: TBA)

== Episodes ==
=== Guest artists ===
| Legend: |
Good singer
Bad singer
— The contestant(s) chose to risk the money.
— The contestant(s) chose to walk away with the money.

| Episode | | Guest artist (Note: Players' notes: For the returning guest artists (who also include foreigners and former good singers), names are displayed in italics.; For the mixed groups, names who identified as bad singers are displayed in italics.) | Contestant(s) | Mystery singers (In their respective numbers and aliases) | | | | | | |
| # | Date | Guest artist | Contestant(s) | Elimination order | | | | | | Winner |
| # | Date | Guest artist | Contestant(s) | TBA | TBA | | TBA | | TBA | Winner |
|---|---|---|---|---|---|---|---|---|---|---|
| 1 | 19 October 2023 | Jelka van Houten | Simone | 1. () | 2. Robbert Bijnen; (Environmentalist) | 3. () | 4. () | 5. () | 6. () | 7. () |
| 2 | 26 October 2023 | Tania Kross (Note: Season's highlight: Foreign guest artist: Tania Kross (CUW; ep. 2)) | Jordy | 1. () | 2. () | 3. () | 5. () | 4. Rinyen Mellany; (Cotton Candy Vendor) | 6. Daria Zueva; (Actress) | 7. () |
| 3 | 2 November 2023 | Thomas Berge | Danielle and Monique | 1. () | 2. () | 3. () | 4. () | 5. () | 6. () | 7. () |
| 4 | 9 November 2023 | Vajèn van den Bosch | Marloes and Romany → €10,000 | 1. () | 2. () | 3. () | 4. () | 5. () | 6. () | 7. () |
| 5 | 16 November 2023 | Roel van Velzen | Nelson → €10,000 | 7. (Quiz Bee) | 2. (Ice Hockey Player) | 5. (Laboratory Analyst) | 6. (French Fries Baker) | 4. (Waitress) | 1. (Formula Racing Fan) | 3. Luc Burghout; Kitesurfer |
| 6 | 23 November 2023 | Soy Kroon | Yannick and Maurice → €3,000 | 4. (Miss Beauty) | 7. (Fairytale Fan) | 3. (Motorcycle Rider) | 1. (Child Star) | 6. (Dance Instructor) | 2. (Neurologist) | 5. IT Specialist |
| 7 | 30 November 2023 | Danny de Munk | Arjun → €3,000 | 1. Jayden Daniels; (Security Guard) | 5. (Train Conductor) | 2. (Queen of Soul) | 6. (Football Fan) | 3. (Tennis Player) | 4. (Model) | 7. Photographer |
| 8 | 7 December 2023 | Mart Hoogkamer | Nancy and Brigitte → €0 | 1. (Cashier) | 4. Manuela Nzenge; (Lounge Singer) | 2. (Cover Band Vocalist) | 7. (Pit Girl) | 3. (Hairdresser) | 5. (Florist) | 6. Korfball Player |

=== Panelists ===
| Legend: |
Regular panelist
Guest panelist

| Apps | | Panelists in attendance (Sorted by first appearance, with episode designations) |
| g# | p# | Panelists in attendance (Sorted by first appearance, with episode designations) |
|---|---|---|
| 8 | 2 | Marieke Elsinga and Fred van Leer (1–8) |
| 7 | 1 | Danny de Munk (1–6, 8) |
| 1 | 1 | Nikkie de Jager (7) |

== Reception ==
| Legend: |
Highest rated episode
Lowest rated episode

| No. | Title | Air date | Timeslot (CET) | Points | | | Viewership | | | Ref(s) |
| No. | Title | Air date | Timeslot (CET) | Rank | Density | Share | Live | VOSDAL | Total | Ref(s) |
|---|---|---|---|---|---|---|---|---|---|---|
| 1 | "Jelka van Houten" | 19 October 2023 | Thursday, 20:30 | 11 | 5.8 | 18.4% | 0.939 | 0.636 | 1.575 | |
| 2 | "Tania Kross" | 26 October 2023 | Thursday, 20:30 | 15 | 4.4 | 12.6% | 0.72 | 0.67 | 1.39 | |
| 3 | "Thomas Berge" | 2 November 2023 | Thursday, 20:30 | 13 | 5.1 | 14.1% | 0.836 | 0.679 | 1.515 | |
| 4 | "Vajèn van den Bosch" | 9 November 2023 | Thursday, 20:30 | 14 | 4.6 | 13.7% | 0.746 | 0.685 | 1.431 | |
| 5 | "Roel van Velzen" | 16 November 2023 | Thursday, 20:30 | 14 | 4.8 | 13.8% | 0.775 | 0.645 | 1.42 | |
| 6 | "Soy Kroon" | 23 November 2023 | Thursday, 20:30 | 13 | 5.1 | 16% | 0.83 | 0.902 | 1.732 | |
| 7 | "Danny de Munk" | 30 November 2023 | Thursday, 20:30 | 12 | 5.3 | 16.4% | 0.859 | 0.71 | 1.569 | |
| 8 | "Mart Hoogkamer" | 7 December 2023 | Thursday, 20:30 | 9 | 5.6 | 18.8% | 0.915 | 0.773 | 1.688 | |

Source: Nationaal Media Onderzoek
