= I Can See Your Voice (Dutch game show) season 3 =

Television game show season

I Can See Your Voice
- Season 3
- Starring: Danny de Munk; Marieke Elsinga; Edsilia Rombley; Fred van Leer
- Hosted by: Carlo Boszhard
- Winners: Good singers: 6; Bad singers: 4
- No. of episodes: 10

Release
- Original network: RTL 4
- Original release: 21 January – 25 March 2022

Season chronology
- ← Previous; Season 2 Next → Season 4

The third season of the Dutch television mystery music game show I Can See Your Voice was originally scheduled to premiere on RTL 4 on 17 February 2022, but it began airing earlier on 21 January 2022, as a sudden replacement to the prematurely ended 12th season of The Voice of Holland due to a sexual misconduct controversy.

== Gameplay ==
=== Format ===
According to the original South Korean rules, the guest artist and contestant must attempt to eliminate bad singers during its game phase. At the final performance, the last remaining mystery singer is revealed as either good or bad by means of a duet between them and one of the guest artists.

If the last remaining mystery singer is good, the contestant wins €5,000; this is also applied to the winning bad singer selected by them.

=== Rounds ===
1. First impression (Dutch: Eerste indruk)
  The guest artist and contestant are given some time to observe and examine each mystery singer based on their appearance.
2. Lip sync (Dutch: Lipsynchronisatie)
  Each mystery singer performs a lip sync to a song; good singers mime to a recording of their own, while bad singers mime to a backing track by another vocalist.
3. Witness (Dutch: Bewijs)
  The guest artist and contestant are presented with a video package containing possible clues by one of the mystery singers.
4. Secret studio (Dutch: Geheime studio)
  The guest artist and contestant are presented with video from a recording session by one of the mystery singers, but pitch-shifted to obscure their actual vocals.

== Episodes ==
Legend:
Good singer
Bad singer
— The contestants won the money.
— The winning bad singer stole the money.

Episode		Guest artist (Note: Players' notes: For the returning guest artists (who also include foreigners and former good singers), names are displayed in italics.; For the mixed groups, names who identified as bad singers are displayed in italics.)	Contestant	Mystery singers (In their respective numbers and aliases)						
#	Date	Guest artist	Contestant	Elimination order						Winner
#	Date	Guest artist	Contestant	First impression	Lip sync		Witness		Secret studio	Winner
1	21 January 2022	Jan Smit	Shirley → €0	7. Deborah Moreno; (Fashion Model)	4. Elise Doesema; (Mermaid)	2. Peter Gijsbertsen; (Gardener)	1. Marieke van Beek; (Belly Dancer)	5. Ilaisa Ghisaidoobe; (Dream Hunter)	6. Dirk Monsma; (Gym Owner)	3. Lotte van de Ven; Sneaker Queen
2	28 January 2022	Jeroen van der Boom	Linda → €0	6. Aprilina Prastari; (Indonesian Star)	1. Maud Beeren; (Grimmer)	4. Mieke Koers; (Nightclub Singer)	5. Mike den Besten; (Emerging Talent)	2. Jory Jollyfish; (DJ)	7. Aan Poelstra; (Sailor)	3. Mariël de Vries; Queen of Horror
3	4 February 2022	Anita Meyer	Stephan → €5,000	4. Bastiaan van Schaik; (Rugby Player)	3. Severa Christina; (Cape Verdean Cook)	7. Lars Wassenaar; (Hippie)	2. Joey Oerlemans; (Weekend Singer)	6. Renée Schepers; (Country Girl)	5. Lois van der Liet; (Nanny)	1. Denise Joan; Elf
4	11 February 2022	Donnie	Jaco → €5,000	4. Marco Attura; (Choir Director)	6. Tom Deux; (Barber)	3. Margot Dicke; (Spicy Lady)	1. Naomi Gael; (Folk Singer)	5. Chesley Verbond; (Samba Dancer)	2. Steven Aponte; (Mister Baywatch)	7. Linda Ammerlaan; Golden Girl
5	18 February 2022	Ruth Jacott (Note: Season highlights: Foreign guest artists: Patty Brard (Luv') (IDN; ep. 10) and Ruth Jacott (SUR; ep. 5))	Dhiraj → €0	7. Anita van Wijk; (90s Girl)	1. Ixchel Denise; (Dog Groomer)	4. Pascal Molenaar; (Crude Husker)	2. Robin Smaling; (Candyman)	3. Leah Wielink; (Madame Ooh La La)	5. Luna Zegers; (Flamenco Singer)	6. Jimmy van der Spree; Scientist
6	25 February 2022	Frans Duijts	Tony → €5,000	5. Wilma Valentijn; (Market Saleswoman)	6. Noë van Leeuwen; (Acrobat)	4. Daphne van Beers; (Kitchen Princess)	3. Aldert Jan Hoek; (Hairdresser)	2. Jacqueline van Noort; (Mother of Pride)	7. Sanne Roozen; (Horse Girl)	1. Jeffrey Sanders; Happy Camper
7	4 March 2022	Nielson	Eliana → €0	2. Freek Nijpels; (French Guy)	1. Eleanor Dingemans; (Miss ICSYV)	6. Wendy Pragt; (Disco Dolly)	3. Priscilla Veerkamp; (Plastic Fantastic)	7. Romy Hausmann; (Rich Girl)	5. Belana Bloebaum; (Singing Sister)	4. Richard Stooker; Mentalist
8	11 March 2022	Jake Reese	Robin → €5,000	4. Roy van der Ree; (Little Monster)	1. Summer Verzijl; (Cheerleader)	5. Eva Catharina; (Prima Ballerina)	2. Hans van Liempd; (Living Legend)	6. Jürgen de Werd; (Soldier)	3. Nathalie den Decker; (Dreamgirl)	7. Anna de Vries; Lady Law
9	18 March 2022	Mart Hoogkamer	Melissa → €5,000	3. Wesley Meuris; (Gothic)	1. Ricky Jansen; (Football Coach)	2. Yadzia Doolaege; (Festival Girl)	4. Rituka Dahal; (Bollywood Actress)	5. Alwin Rennen; (Singing Broker)	6. Vanessa Heres; (Purser)	7. May Maria Sommer; Musical Girl
10	25 March 2022	Patty Brard (Luv')	Stacey → €5,000	4. Donna Senders; (Miss Sunshine)	2. Adriano Trindade; (Mister Bigband)	5. Malaika Grace; (Gravity Artist)	3. Imke van Laar; (Alpine Skier)	7. Elles Tetelepta; (Popstar)	6. Keven Kolkman; (Pastry Chef)	1. Mindel Smid; Waitress

== Reception ==
Legend:
Highest rated episode
Lowest rated episode

No.	Title	Air date	Timeslot (CET)	Points			Viewership			Ref(s)
No.	Title	Air date	Timeslot (CET)	Rank	Density	Share	Live	VOSDAL	Total	Ref(s)
1	"Jan Smit"	21 January 2022	Friday, 20:00	6	8	17.5%	1.298	1.202	2.5	
2	"Jeroen van der Boom"	28 January 2022	Friday, 20:00	3	8.5	19.9%	1.368	1.305	2.673	
3	"Anita Meyer"	4 February 2022	Friday, 20:00	6	7.7	18.1%	1.244	1.115	2.359	
4	"Donnie"	11 February 2022	Friday, 20:00	7	7.9	18.1%	1.286	0.981	2.267	
5	"Ruth Jacott"	18 February 2022	Friday, 20:00	9	8	17.2%	1.297	0.984	2.281	
6	"Frans Duijts"	25 February 2022	Friday, 20:00	8	7.3	17.1%	1.188	0.921	2.109	
7	"Nielson"	4 March 2022	Friday, 20:00	5	6.8	16.4%	1.105	1.1	2.205	
8	"Jake Reese"	11 March 2022	Friday, 20:00	8	7	16.4%	1.134	0.871	2.005	
9	"Mart Hoogkamer"	18 March 2022	Friday, 20:00	4	7.5	19.3%	1.219	0.882	2.101	
10	"Patty Brard"	25 March 2022	Friday, 20:00	6	6.9	17.7%	1.111	1.001	2.112	

Source: Stichting KijkOnderzoek
