= I Can See Your Voice (Dutch game show) season 2 =

Television game show season

I Can See Your Voice
- Season 2
- Starring: Danny de Munk; Marieke Elsinga; Edsilia Rombley; Fred van Leer
- Hosted by: Carlo Boszhard
- Winners: Good singers: 3; Bad singers: 4
- No. of episodes: Regular: 6; Special: 1; Overall: 7

Release
- Original network: RTL 4
- Original release: 22 April – 10 June 2021

Season chronology
- ← Previous; Season 1 Next → Season 3

The second season of the Dutch television mystery music game show I Can See Your Voice premiered on RTL 4 on 22 April 2021.

At the time of filming during the COVID-19 pandemic, health and safety protocols are also implemented.

== Gameplay ==
=== Format ===
According to the original South Korean rules, the guest artist and contestant must attempt to eliminate bad singers during its game phase. At the final performance, the last remaining mystery singer is revealed as either good or bad by means of a duet between them and one of the guest artists.

If the last remaining mystery singer is good, the contestant wins €5,000; this is also applied to the winning bad singer selected by them. For the kids' special, the winning mystery singer, regardless of being good or bad, receives a tablet phone.

=== Rounds ===
1. First impression (Dutch: Eerste indruk)
  The guest artist and contestant are given some time to observe and examine each mystery singer based on their appearance.
2. Lip sync (Dutch: Lipsynchronisatie)
  Each mystery singer performs a lip sync to a song; good singers mime to a recording of their own, while bad singers mime to a backing track by another vocalist.
3. Witness (Dutch: Bewijs)
  The guest artist and contestant are presented with a video package containing possible clues by one of the mystery singers.
4. Secret studio (Dutch: Geheime studio)
  The guest artist and contestant are presented with video from a recording session by one of the mystery singers, but pitch-shifted to obscure their actual vocals.

== Episodes ==
Legend:
Good singer
Bad singer
— The contestants won the money.
— The winning bad singer stole the money.

Episode		Guest artist (Note: Players' notes: For the returning guest artists (who also include foreigners and former good singers), names are displayed in italics.; For the mixed groups, names who identified as bad singers are displayed in italics.)	Contestant	Mystery singers (In their respective numbers and aliases)						
#	Date	Guest artist	Contestant	Elimination order						Winner
#	Date	Guest artist	Contestant	First impression	Lip sync		Witness		Secret studio	Winner
1	22 April 2021	Glennis Grace	Marianne → €0	3. Fernando Lindez; (Fashion Gladiator)	4. Bernice Rose; (Miss Summer Carnival)	6. Steven Smits; (Free Runner)	7. Myrthe Hendrix; (Pop Princess)	5. Linda Weel-Loos; (Fado Singer)	2. Karen Kamar; (Yoga Master)	1. Maurits Hazeleger; The Joker
2	29 April 2021	Francis van Broekhuizen	Nick → €5,000	3. Joran Doornewaard; (Diver)	6. Mylène van de Vijver; (Glitter Girl)	7. Sjors Scheres; (Mister Wedding)	1. Ilona Dekker; (School Teacher)	5. Ian Hughes; (Glam Rocker)	2. Marie-Claire Persijn; (Miss Hip-hop)	4. Guus Boswinkel; Super Trouper
3	6 May 2021	Glen Faria	Farid → €5,000	5. Kiki Peters; (Happy Hippie)	7. Chantal Reemer; (Passionate Propper)	4. Lisa Rooyakkers; (Fairytale Princess)	2. Rowena Spierdijk; (The Queen)	6. Danny Buisman; (Brabantse Bourgondiër)	1. Sederick Short; (Salsa King)	3. Jordy Vestering; Rough Diamond
4	13 May 2021	Jim Bakkum	Svenja → €0	1. Sikira Alexander; (Frivolous Fashionista)	2. Thomas Luijf; (Party Singer)	6. Mirjam Stoolhuis; (Dental Assistant)	4. Jessica Lokhorst; (Stylish Dancer)	7. Jolien Folkerts; (Pin-up Girl)	3. Aniek Mommers; (Sea-star)	5. Fabiano Erdas; Pitbull
5	27 May 2021	René Froger	Ann → €0	3. Maurien den Engelsman; (One Man Band)	7. Janine Waardenburg; (Soprano)	4. Elise Gabriel; (Sexy Gamer)	1. Nick Holleman; (Wild Rocker)	2. Esther Pierweijer; (Classic Lady)	6. Sophie Valentijn; (Stage Vamp)	5. Edyurika Sambo; Miss Sunshine
6	3 June 2021	Berget Lewis	Marjorie → €5,000	1. Mitch Looye; (Boyband Benjamin)	4. Talisa Wolters; (Lady Soul)	3. Marjolein Heiltjes; (Schlager Schwester)	2. Björn Lodder; (Showmaster)	6. Luciënne Voormeulen; (Office Manager)	5. Jeremy Ishak; (Baseball Player)	7. Naomi van Rie; Zeelander Girl
Special	10 June 2021	Silver Metz	—N/a	3. Boele Steensma; (Ariana Grande Fan)	1. Quinten Posthuma; (Piano Boy)	2. Yara Fortes; (Little Scientist)	4. Rens Odink; (Greatest Showman)	5. Anne Julie Beekman; (Ice Hockey Player)	7. Fay Veldhof; (Fashion Girl)	6. Joey Doensen; Breakdancer

== Reception ==
Legend:
Highest rated episode
Lowest rated episode

No.	Title	Air date	Timeslot (CET)	Points			Viewership			Ref(s)
No.	Title	Air date	Timeslot (CET)	Rank	Density	Share	Live	VOSDAL	Total	Ref(s)
1	"Glennis Grace"	22 April 2021	Thursday, 20:30	4	7.7	18.1%	1.235	1.047	2.282	
2	"Francis van Broekhuizen"	29 April 2021	Thursday, 20:30	4	8.5	21.6%	1.376	1.028	2.404	
3	"Glen Faria"	6 May 2021	Thursday, 20:30	3	8	21.4%	1.284	0.899	2.183	
4	"Jim Bakkum"	13 May 2021	Thursday, 20:30	2	7.8	24%	1.262	0.918	2.18	
5	"Réne Froger"	27 May 2021	Thursday, 20:30	3	8.3	23.6%	1.343	1.098	2.441	
6	"Berget Lewis"	3 June 2021	Thursday, 20:30	4	6.6	20.5%	1.069	0.939	2.008	
Special	"Silver Metz"	10 June 2021	Thursday, 20:30	4	5.2	19.3%	0.839	0.755	1.594	

Source: Stichting KijkOnderzoek
