= I Can See Your Voice (Dutch game show) season 4 =

Television game show season

I Can See Your Voice
- Season 4
- Starring: Marieke Elsinga; Edsilia Rombley; Fred van Leer
- Hosted by: Carlo Boszhard
- Winners: Good singers: 3; Bad singers: 4
- No. of episodes: Regular: 6; Special: 1; Overall: 7

Release
- Original network: RTL 4
- Original release: Regular season: 31 August 2022 – 5 October 2022; Special: 22 December 2022

Season chronology
- ← Previous; Season 3 Next → Season 5

The fourth season of the Dutch television mystery music game show I Can See Your Voice premiered on RTL 4 on 31 August 2022.

== Gameplay ==
=== Format ===
According to the original South Korean rules, the guest artist and contestant must attempt to eliminate bad singers during its game phase. At the final performance, the last remaining mystery singer is revealed as either good or bad by means of a duet between them and one of the guest artists.

The contestant must eliminate one mystery singer at the end of each round, receiving €1,000 if they eliminate a bad singer. At the end of a game, if the contestant decides to walk away, they will keep the money had won in previous rounds; if they decide to risk for the last remaining mystery singer, they win €7,500 if a singer is good, or lose their all winnings if a singer is bad.

=== Rounds ===
1. First impression (Dutch: Eerste indruk)
  The guest artist and contestant are given some time to observe and examine each mystery singer based on their appearance.
2. Lip sync (Dutch: Lipsynchronisatie)
  Each mystery singer performs a lip sync to a song; good singers mime to a recording of their own, while bad singers mime to a backing track by another vocalist.
3. Witness (Dutch: Bewijs)
  The guest artist and contestant are presented with a video package containing possible clues by one of the mystery singers.
4. Secret studio (Dutch: Geheime studio)
  The guest artist and contestant are presented with video from a recording session by one of the mystery singers, but pitch-shifted to obscure their actual vocals.

== Episodes ==
=== Guest artists ===
Legend:
Good singer
Bad singer
— The contestants chose to risk the money.
— The contestants chose to walk away with the money.

Episode		Guest artist (Note: Players' notes: For the returning guest artists (who also include foreigners and former good singers), names are displayed in italics.; For the mixed groups, names who identified as bad singers are displayed in italics.)	Contestant	Mystery singers (In their respective numbers and aliases)						
#	Date	Guest artist	Contestant	Elimination order						Winner
#	Date	Guest artist	Contestant	First impression	Lip sync		Witness		Secret studio	Winner
1	31 August 2022	Wolter Kroes	Richard → €0	7. Aschwin Leer; (Chef)	1. Esther de Haas; (Funky Lady)	3. Veronique ter Laak; (Pilot)	6. Rochelle Moes; (Clown)	5. Sophia Links; (Nerd)	4. Joyce van der Lee; (Miss Holland)	2. Remi Brouns; Grill Master
2	7 September 2022	Trijntje Oosterhuis	Nina → €7,500	2. Arthur; (Horica Tiger)	5. Daan; (Scribble King)	6. Kim; (Fit Mom)	1. Laszlo Gallo; (Singer-Songwriter)	7. (Classic Lady)	3. Lois Lygia; (Urban DJ)	4. Ayla; Rugby Player
3	14 September 2022	Jamai Loman	Ysabel → €2,000	3. Jon; (World Traveler)	1. Liesanne van Dongen; (Tap Dancer)	2. Ria; (Veterinarian)	4. Chahrazad; (Moroccan Star)	6. Demi; (Farmer's Wife)	5. Dylan Meischke; (Blacksmith)	7. Annegien; R&B Queen of Rotterdam
4	21 September 2022	Edsilia Rombley	Emma → €3,000	1. Sabrina Young; (Opera Singer)	5. Marion Rossieau-Gilsing; (Wedding Singer)	3. Niels Blokzijl; (Male Nurse)	6. Rachel More; (Scary Spice)	4. Tiamo Koster; (Guard Dancer)	7. Yke Oude Griep; (Bookworm)	2. Nicky Caspers-Boeren; Pink Lady
5	28 September 2022	Buddy Vedder	Tarini → €0	2. Wendy; (Tour Guide)	6. Britt; (Bride)	1. Montana; (Fashion Model)	7. Menno Schellevis; (Party DJ)	4. (Swinging Sisters)	5. Anouk Post; (Band Vocalist)	3. Collin van Assendelft; Gamer
6	5 October 2022	Emma Heesters	Tom → €7,500	6. Remko Berkhout; (Marathon Runner)	4. Dewi; (Showgirl)	7. Shirley Salomon; (Office Worker)	3. Alessandra; (Swimming Teacher)	5. Maaike Boksebeld; (Black Crosser)	1. Rick van den Belt; (Musical Lover)	2. Alishia; Mommy to Be
Special	22 December 2022	Francis van Broekhuizen	Astrid → €10,000	4. (Christmas Gift)	5. (Rock n' Roll Santa)	2. (Singing Santa)	7. (Grinch)	3. (Christmas Diva)	6. (Christmas Angel)	1. Irada Delsink; Snow Princess

=== Panelists ===
Legend:
Regular panelist
Guest panelist

Apps		Panelists in attendance (Sorted by first appearance, with episode designations)
g#	p#	Panelists in attendance (Sorted by first appearance, with episode designations)
7	2	Marieke Elsinga and Fred van Leer (1–6; sp. 1)
6	1	Edsilia Rombley (1–3, 5–6; sp. 1)
1	1	Miljuschka Witzenhausen (4)

== Reception ==
Legend:
Highest rated episode
Lowest rated episode

No.	Title	Air date	Timeslot (CET)	Points			Viewership			Ref(s)
No.	Title	Air date	Timeslot (CET)	Rank	Density	Share	Live	VOSDAL	Total	Ref(s)
1	"Wolter Kroes"	31 August 2022	Wednesday, 20:30	8	4.6	15.2%	0.75	0.868	1.618	
2	"Trijntje Oosterhuis"	7 September 2022	Wednesday, 20:30	9	4.4	14.2%	0.717	0.79	1.507	
3	"Jamai Loman"	14 September 2022	Wednesday, 20:30	11	4.5	14.2%	0.728	0.718	1.446	
4	"Edsilia Rombley"	21 September 2022	Wednesday, 20:30	11	4.8	15%	0.781	0.842	1.623	
5	"Buddy Vedder"	28 September 2022	Wednesday, 20:30	9	5.2	16.4%	0.843	0.868	1.711	
6	"Emma Heesters"	5 October 2022	Wednesday, 20:30	11	5	15.2%	0.813	0.897	1.71	
Special	"Francis van Broekhuizen"	22 December 2022	Thursday, 20:30	6	6.9	18.2%	1.111	0.882	1.993	

Source: Stichting KijkOnderzoek
