= Wowser (TV series) =

Japanese anime television series

- どんどんドメルとロン
- Genre: Comedy
- Created by: Cubitus by Dupa
- Directed by: Hiroshi Sasagawa (chief)
- Music by: Takanori Arisawa
- Countries of origin: Japan; Netherlands
- Original language: Japanese
- No. of episodes: 52 (104 segments)

Production
- Producers: Nobuomi Nakamura (TV Tokyo); Kazuo Tabata (Telecable)
- Production companies: TV Tokyo; Telescreen

Original release
- Network: MegaTON (TV Tokyo)
- Release: April 5, 1988 – March 27, 1989

Wowser, known in Japan as Bigger and Better: Dommel & Ron (どんどんドメルとロン, Don Don: Domeru to Ron), is an anime based on the Belgian comic strip Cubitus. It is the first TV anime to be produced by anime studio Telecable. It consisted of 52 two-part episodes the running time of 25 minutes in total, and it originally aired from 5 April 1988 to 27 March 1989. The show aired in the United States on The Family Channel in 1989.

== Plot ==
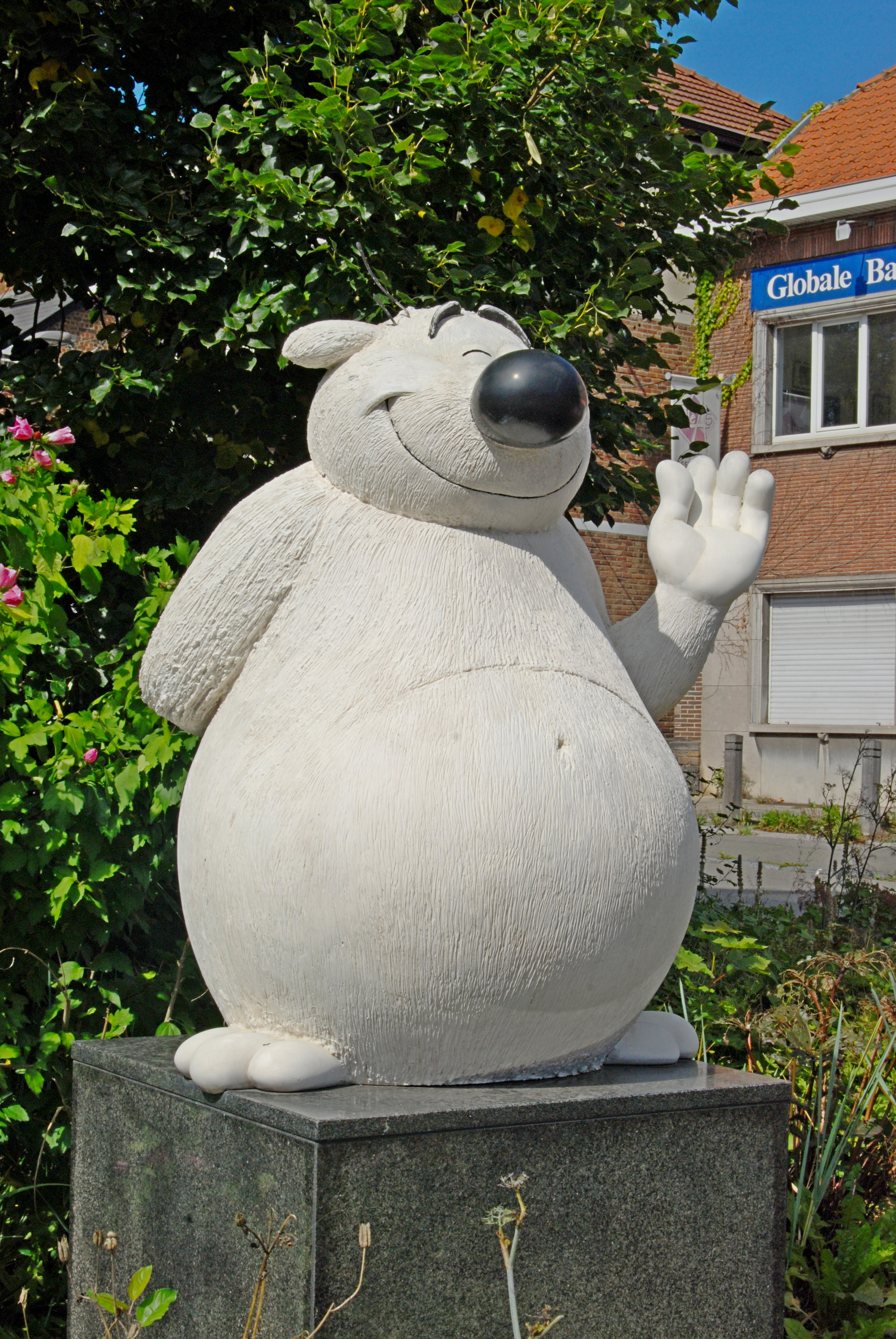
Statue of Cubitus in Limal.

Wowser is a large, white dog who has a big appetite and lives with his owner Professor Dinghy, a genius inventor. They live next door to Beatrice, an old lady with an apron; Linda Lovely and her brother Bob; and Ratso Catso, a black-and-white cat who often ruins Wowser's day or sabotages Dinghy's inventions.

== Characters ==
- Wowser (ドメル, Domeru; Dommel) is the main character. A large, white dog, he has a good-natured personality but a lazy disposition and a humongous appetite which often get him into trouble. He often tries to have a good day, only to get annoyed by Ratso or Beatrice. He often tests out Dinghy's inventions. Japanese voice actor: Naoki Tatsuta. English voice actor: Jeff Winkless.
- Professor Dinghy (ロン, Ron; Ron) is Wowser's owner who has a big white moustache and wears a pink sweater. He is a genius inventor, although his eccentric creations usually backfire on him due to people using the wrong way or Ratso interfering with them. He mostly likes to use Wowser to check his inventions. Japanese voice actor: Kaneta Kimotsuki. English voice actor: Simon Prescott.
- Ratso Catso (ブラッキー, Burakkī; Blackie) is an annoying black-and-white neighbourhood cat who appears to be Wowser's rival or his friend for some reason, and often pretends to be nice and sabotages the Professor's inventions. Japanese voice actress: Rika Matsumoto. English voice actor: Robert Axelrod.
- Linda Lovely (チェリー, Cherī; Cherry) is a teenager who seems to take quite a fancy interest towards Wowser. Wowser and Dinghy also seem to have a crush on her. Japanese voice actress: Mīna Tominaga. English voice actress: Wendee Swan.
- Bob Lovely (ボブ, Bobu; Bob) is Linda's young little brother. Japanese voice actress: Tarako. English voice actress: Barbara Goodson, Wendee Swan (episode 11).
- Beatrice (ベアトリクス, Beatorikusu; Beatrix) is a rather plump, tall, bossy, middle-aged woman who is often very rude to Wowser. She also seems to have a secret crush on Dinghy. Japanese voice actress: Kazuko Sugiyama. English voice actress: Melanie MacQueen.
- Officer Whistle (ポリス, Porisu; Police) is a policeman who keeps a whistle in his mouth which is used to tell people off when there is trouble about. Japanese voice actor: Kōichi Yamadera.

== Episodes ==
No.	Title	Original release date
1	"Mr. Mayor's Award" (奇々怪々の大気球)	5 April 1988
2	"Self-Cleaning Machine" (大爆笑パワーアップ)	5 April 1988
3	"A Giant Laser Monster Appears" (レーザー大怪物出現)	12 April 1988
4	"Horoscope" (ハッピー星占い)	12 April 1988
5	"Mouse Machine Operation" (ネズミマシーン作戦)	19 April 1988
6	"A Rare Invention" (珍珍発明二才イラー)	19 April 1988
7	"Ice Skating Machine" (氷りごりマシーン)	26 April 1988
8	"The Underwater Gourmet Ship Departs" (海底グルメ船出発だ)	26 April 1988
9	"Mt. Everest Wowser" (どんどん珍式登山法)	3 May 1988
10	"A Pair of Pitiful Pilots" (爆風サーカス大飛行)	3 May 1988
11	"Slap Happy Birthday" (わくわく混戦証生日)	10 May 1988
12	"Motor Maze to the Market" (メトロ迷路大道跡)	10 May 1988
13	"To Build a Better Bike"	17 May 1988
14	"A Mischievous Cushion"	17 May 1988
15	"Hippo Dance Party" (踊れカバ君カバ騒ぎ)	24 May 1988
16	"Time Trouble" (ドン発明タイムメカ)	24 May 1988
17	"Just an Old Cut-Up" (大恐怖キリカッター)	31 May 1988
18	"Sky High Housing" (おいらの夢夢飛行船)	31 May 1988
19	"Hi Yo Wowser" (木馬パッパカ大競争)	7 June 1988
20	"The Weight Loser" (ドメル無理スリム)	7 June 1988
21	"The Iceman Cometh"	14 June 1988
22	"Automatic Eater"	14 June 1988
23	"I'll See You in a Dream"	21 June 1988
24	"I Want My Mummy" (ドメミイラ怪々事件)	21 June 1988
25	"The Babysitters"	28 June 1988
26	"Crazy Locomotive" (リニア追跡SLボ示)	28 June 1988
27	"Explain That Stain" (透明スプレー大噴射)	5 July 1988
28	"Wild and Woolly Wowser" (メカ馬ガンマン対発)	5 July 1988
29	"Roller Skating"	12 July 1988
30	"The Visitor from Space"	12 July 1988
31	"Wowser Robot"	19 July 1988
32	"In Search of Bones"	19 July 1988
33	"Dinghy's 3-D TV" (飛び出すロンテレビ)	26 July 1988
34	"Insomnia" (ラッコだっこベビー)	26 July 1988
35	"The Salesman"	2 August 1988
36	"The Kidnapper"	2 August 1988
37	"The Terrible Camp Class" (とんだキャンプ教室)	9 August 1988
38	"Wowser's Big Wash" (ラッコだっこベビー)	9 August 1988
39	"A Garbage Giveaway" (ロンがらくた大安売)	16 August 1988
40	"The Haunted House" (ラッコだっこベビー)	16 August 1988
41	"Morning Alarm"	23 August 1988
42	"The Shrunken Dog"	23 August 1988
43	"The Abominable Snowman"	30 August 1988
44	"Looking After the House"	30 August 1988
45	"Little Red Riding Dog and the Wolf"	6 September 1988
46	"Golfing"	6 September 1988
47	"The Champion"	13 September 1988
48	"Hunting for Hares"	13 September 1988
49	"The Wonderful Lamp"	20 September 1988
50	"The Playground"	20 September 1988
51	"Rejuvenation"	27 September 1988
52	"King of the Jungle"	27 September 1988
53	"The Movie Star"	3 October 1988
54	"Wowser and the Beanstalk"	3 October 1988
55	"The Christmas Gift"	10 October 1988
56	"Skiing"	10 October 1988
57	"Life on the Ranch"	17 October 1988
58	"Reeducation"	17 October 1988
59	"Snow Tunnel"	24 October 1988
60	"Martians"	24 October 1988
61	"The Art Thieves"	31 October 1988
62	"The Magic Show"	31 October 1988
63	"The Transferring Machine"	7 November 1988
64	"Super Wowser"	7 November 1988
65	"The Mini-Camera"	14 November 1988
66	"Dracula Meets the Wowser"	14 November 1988
67	"Postman Wowser"	21 November 1988
68	"Snow Sculpture Contest"	21 November 1988
69	"Super Fertilizer"	28 November 1988
70	"The Soccer Trainer"	28 November 1988
71	"Go For It, Gulliver!" (がんばれ！ガリバー)	5 December 1988
72	"The Failed Escape" (ペンキでパンダ)	5 December 1988
73	"The Holiday"	12 December 1988
74	"Hello, Dolphin" (ハローイルカいるか)	12 December 1988
75	"A Romance"	19 December 1988
76	"Bottle Opener"	19 December 1988
77	"Baseball"	26 December 1988
78	"Be Careful with Fire"	26 December 1988
79	"The Beauty Salon Chair"	2 January 1989
80	"Prehistoric Fish"	2 January 1989
81	"The Bell"	9 January 1989
82	"On the Beach"	9 January 1989
83	"The Growth Potion"	16 January 1989
84	"A Break from Inventing"	16 January 1989
85	"The Sound Maker"	23 January 1989
86	"Officer Wowser"	23 January 1989
87	"The Scarecrow"	30 January 1989
88	"Sleeping Beauty"	30 January 1989
89	"Karate"	6 February 1989
90	"The Super Card Machine"	6 February 1989
91	"Pinocchio"	13 February 1989
92	"Planet of the Mice"	13 February 1989
93	"The Useful Robot" (ロボットべんり君)	20 February 1989
94	"Boom! Junk Paintings" (爆発！ガラクタ怪画)	20 February 1989
95	"Long Live the Campsite"	27 February 1989
96	"Snow Survival"	27 February 1989
97	"Ghost Hunters"	6 March 1989
98	"The Butterfly Hunt"	6 March 1989
99	"Energy Crisis"	13 March 1989
100	"The 3D Copy Gun"	13 March 1989
101	"Inventor Teacher for a Day" (発明教室一日先生)	20 March 1989
102	"Dinghy's Beauty Camera" (ロンロン美人カメラ)	20 March 1989
103	"Cinderella"	27 March 1989
104	"Yarn Knitting Operation" (愛のアミアミ作戦)	27 March 1989

== Foreign versions ==
The English-language version was produced by Saban Entertainment. Retitled Wowser, the series aired in 1989 on The Family Channel. The dub changed the names of the characters and replaced the original music. A promotional pilot trailer was made by Saban to sell the series, with Doug Lee as the narrator, Jeff Winkless as Wowser and Ratso Catso, Robert V. Barron as Professor Dinghy, and Iona Morris as Beatrice. Some scenes were removed or edited due to their violent or sexual nature:

- One scene in "Hippo Dance Party" was removed, where Dinghy beats Wowser on the head.
- Another scene in "Slap Happy Birthday" was removed, where a chicken attacks Beatrice, causing her to crash and rip and ruin her dress.
- In "Self-Cleaning Machine", an entire scene is censored where Dinghy's vacuum backfires, and Linda's clothes fly out the window and land in parts of town. A bra lands on a male statue's chest, to which he covers himself.

In the United Kingdom, Wowser aired on ITV and later on Channel 4 in the early and mid-1990s. Two videos of the series were released in two volumes by Stylus Video. In the USA, in 1990 and 1991, Wowser was released on video in four volumes in episodes with running times of 30 minutes and 60 minutes. In Canada, it aired on YTV between 1990 and 1993. In Malaysia, it aired on TV3 between 1991 and 1994.

Elsewhere, the series was dubbed in Arabic in Jordan, and released throughout the Arab world; this version was named Ka'abool (Arabic: كعبول). In 1990, the series was dubbed in French as Cubitus; it was featured on the programme Avant l'école on TF1, and aired on Super Écran in Quebec. In Spain, it was dubbed into Spanish, Basque and Catalan, re-titled Gordi, Dommel Artzain Txakurra ("Dommel the Shepherd Dog") and Dommel respectively. It was also dubbed into Dutch as Dommel, airing on BRT, VARA and Kindernet from 1989 to 2003. The latter channel relaunched as Nickelodeon Kindernet on Comedy Central, and the series aired from May 2011 until 31 October 2013. Since 2015, it has aired on Pebble TV. The Italian version of Wowser was titled Teodoro e l'invenzione che non va ("Theodore and the Invention that Doesn't Work"). In Hong Kong, the series was re-titled IQ 零蛋多毛狗 ("IQ Zero Egg Hairy Dog") and aired on TVB Jade in 1989.

== Songs ==
=== Japanese version ===
Opening song

- "Fly Away - Yume no Hikouki"

Lyricist: Arisu Satou / Composer: Takanori Arisawa / Arrangement: Seichi Kyouda / Singer: Mitsuko Horie / Production: Nippon Columbia
Ending song

- "GO! GO! My Friend"

Lyricist: Arisu Satou / Composer: Takanori Arisawa / Arrangement: Seichi Kyouda / Singer: Mitsuko Horie / Production: Nippon Columbia

=== English version ===
Opening song

- "Wow-Wow Wowser"

Composers: Haim Saban and Shuki Levy / Arrangement: Michael Tavera and Bob Mithoff / Production: Saban Entertainment
Ending song

- "Wow-Wow Wowser (Instrumental)"

Composers: Haim Saban and Shuki Levy / Arrangement: Michael Tavera and Bob Mithoff / Production: Saban Entertainment
