= Cubitus =

Belgian comic series

- Cubitus
- Author(s): Dupa, Michel Rodrigue, Pierre Aucaigne
- Illustrator(s): Dupa, Michel Rodrigue
- Current status/schedule: Running
- Launch date: April 16, 1968 in Tintin magazine
- Publisher: Le Lombard
- Genre(s): Humor comics, Gag cartoon

Cubitus is a Franco-Belgian comics series, and the basis for the Wowser cartoon series appearing in the United States. Cubitus was created by the Belgian cartoonist Dupa, and features Cubitus, a large anthropomorphic dog, who lives with his owner Sémaphore. Cubitus is known as Dommel in Flanders and the Netherlands, Muppelo or Pom Pom in Finland, Teodoro in Italy, Zıpır in Turkey and Доммель in Russia. His name derives from the old anatomical name of the ulna bone, supposedly derived from the Greek kybiton (elbow).

== Synopsis ==
The series tells the story of Cubitus, a good-natured large, white dog endowed with speech. He lives in a house in the suburbs with his master, Sémaphore, a retired sailor, next door to Sénéchal, a black-and-white cat who is Cubitus' nemesis.

A vast majority of the album publications collect single page gags, but a few gather collections of shorter stories or, in rare cases, one long story throughout the entire album. Some of the single gag albums or short story compilations are thematic; for instance, Cubitus illustre ses ancêtres ("Cubitus Illustrates his Ancestors") revisiting history of humankind, L'ami ne fait pas le moine ("A Friend Doesn't Make the Monk") being pastiches of fellow authors from the Tintin magazine, or Les enquêtes de l'inspecteur Cubitus ("The Investigations of Inspector Cubitus") where he is a fictional police inspector.

=== Characters ===
- Cubitus: The main protagonist of the series. Known as "Cubi" to his friends, he is a white dog with a large belly, a black snout and yellow tail. His master Sémaphore named him after the bone that Cubitus peed on when he was just a few days old. Initially a four-legged dog with hair covering his eyes, Cubitus eventually ended up becoming more anthropomorphic. Nearly entirely human in behaviour, he walks on two legs, has hands instead of paws, and is able to perform any human action, although he retains his canine love of bones. His favorite hobbies are eating, sleeping, and boxing Sénéchal. Cubitus is also aware that he is a comic book character, or rather a "comic book hero".
- Sémaphore: A retired sailor who is the "master" of Cubitus, even if the relationship of master and dog is sometimes reversed. In the series, Sémaphore's role is mainly to create inventions that are intended to be functional and aid his friends, but in the end lead to trouble. He has a love for vintage cars and motorcycles (inspired by Dupa's own personal interests), having his own motorcycle named Titine.
- Sénéchal: A black-and-white cat, close neighbour and Cubitus' worst natural enemy, with whom he has an ongoing rivalry. In longer stories he may be Cubitus' ally.
- Bidule: A white puppy and Cubitus' nephew, who first appeared in Les Nouvelles Aventures de Cubitus in 2011. He resembles his uncle, except that he has an orange tail instead of a yellow one. He only communicates through chirping sounds, which are sometimes translated.

==== Side characters ====
- Médor l'escargot: A snail who follows Cubitus practically everywhere. He is sometimes almost invisible and appears as an integral part of the gag, and occasionally has a speaking role. He secretly has a crush on Cubitus.
- Ventenpoupe: An old friend of Sémaphore, and a swindler.
- Victor: A highly sophisticated and omniscient computer, mounted on caterpillar tracks and possessing an antenna with a tip resembling Cubitus's tail. He can speak and has analytical and precognitive abilities. Victor first appeared in Cubitus, pas de salades ("Cubitus, No Nonsense"), where he meets Cubitus after he is "forgotten" by his former owner during a move. After several adventures in search of the owner, Cubitus and Sémaphore adopt him permanently. At the end of the album, Victor's battery dies, and he is placed under a glass dome with the inscription: "If you get the blues, break the glass." Victor reappears in Copain toutes catégorie ("All-Purpose Buddy"), in which he is kidnapped.
- Manuel de Cotalos Y Mucho Gusto: The ghost of a former Spanish racing driver who drove the Douze litres DeValpo ("12-Litre DeValpo"), of whom Sémaphore was a huge fan as a child. Tired of haunting old castles, he falls in love with Sémaphore's motorcycle Titine, and decides to inhabit its sidecar. Manuel is mentioned in album 14, Cubitus, pas de salades, and made his physical appearance in album 16, Alerte au pédalosaure ("Pedalosaur Alert"), even though his arrival and origin are only revealed in album 18, Tout en caressant Cubitus ("While Stroking Cubitus").
- Dupa: The creator of the series. He makes cameo appearances in the albums (and even in the background on the cover of Cubitus, au poil près ("Cubitus, By a Hair")), in a manner similar to Alfred Hitchcock in his films or Hergé in The Adventures of Tintin. Unlike the latter two, however, he sometimes participates in the gag (usually spread over several pages), provides explanations to the album's plot, and complains directly to Cubitus or Sénéchal about their laziness or the absurdity of the plot. Cubitus also knows Dupa very well, often criticizing him for the misfortunes that he suffers in his adventures, with expressions like, "Dupa, tu me paieras ça!" ("Dupa, you'll pay for this!") or "On me dupa!" ("I've been duped!").
- Marcellin: A young boy who is the former master of Cubitus and Sémaphore's nephew. He appears mainly in Du meilleur tonneau ("From the Best Barrel"), and made some appearances in other albums shortly after, but eventually disappeared completely from the series.
- Dorothée: Cubitus and Marcellin's neighbor.
- Little Yellow Canary: An unnamed yellow canary who accompanies Cubitus in early strips, but later disappears from the series. Like Médor, he is mostly mute and occasionally has a speaking role.
- Isidore: A mysterious unseen character, apparently known and loved by all, but never actually seen by Cubitus. He appears in Tout en caressant Cubitus.
- Helmut: A grumpy dwarf living in Cubitus's garden, who desperately hopes to find a garden gnome (whom he later meets). He first appears in Les Nouvelles Aventures de Cubitus.
- Ursula: A discreet, romantic, and slightly naive garden gnome who Helmut has a crush on, making his verbal brutality toward her somewhat paradoxical. She and Helmut often have arguments. She first appears in Les Nouvelles Aventures de Cubitus.
- Miss Badmington: A woman who desperately tries to keep her date at the swimming pool, but is unsuccessful. She appears in three volumes of Les Nouvelles Aventures de Cubitus and the special volume Cubitus fait son cinéma ("Cubitus Goes to the Movies!").
- Polo and Jean-Marie: Two hunters and friends of Sémaphore who have been working together for 20 years.
- Woman on the Internet: A woman whom Sémaphore met on the Internet. They chat together for 18 months.
- Max and his Wife: A young veterinarian couple and the adoptive owners of Bidule, who try their best to handle the puppy's mischief and energy.
- Câline: A black-and-white kitten and Sénéchal's niece who lives next door.
- Pupuce: A large, gray vegetarian bulldog.

== Creation ==
In 1968, Greg asked Dupa to create a character to fill an empty page in an issue of the Franco-Belgian comics magazine Tintin. Dupa sketched a large, white talking dog with a yellow tail, and gave him the name "Cubitus", naming him after the Latin anatomical name of the ulna bone.

The series' humor, art style, and universe were inspired and influenced by that of Greg's Achille Talon, with the adversarial relationship of Cubitus, Sénéchal and Sémaphore being reminiscent of Achille Talon, Hilarion Lefuneste and Alambic Dieudonné Corydon Talon. Dupa cited Pierre Perret, Marcel Pagnol, the Marx Brothers, Walt Disney, Tex Avery, the Countess of Ségur's stories and science fiction literature as his influences.

== Publication history ==
Cubitus first appeared in Tintin on April 16, 1968. The series gained immediate popularity, and began album publication in 1972. After several years of gags and album publications, it became the title strip for a magazine of its own. The first publication of Cubitus was published by Le Lombard in December 1989, though it proved short-lived, lasting only six issues. In July 1992, Jean-François Debaty wrote a special 5-page collective story celebrating the series' 1000th gag strip in Hello Bédé, collaborating with most of the other artists of the magazine. Following Dupa's death in 2000, Le Lombard published two posthumous albums, Cubitus, ça n'arrive qu'à toi... ("Cubitus, This Only Happens to You") in 2001, and Tu te la coules douce... ("You’re Having a Great Time...") in 2002.

In 2005, the series was relaunched by Pierre Aucaigne and Michel Rodrigue (who read the series during his childhood and became friends with Dupa in 1996) under the title Les Nouvelles Aventures de Cubitus ("The New Adventures of Cubitus"). Gilles "Erroc" Corre would take over writing duties beginning with volume 7, due to Aucaigne's busy work schedule for television and theatre. In 2011, Adeline Blondieau and Rodrigue created a spin-off series named Bidule, starring Cubitus' nephew of the same name. The series received mixed reviews.

== Bibliography ==
=== Dupa albums ===
German edition of Tu le fais exprès ou quoi? (1983)

1. Du meilleur tonneau (1972)
2. Un oscar pour Cubitus (1973)
3. 3e service (1974)
4. Tout en caressant Cubitus (1975)
5. Chien sans souci (1976)
6. Alerte au pédalosaure (1977)
7. Cubitus illustre ses ancêtres (1977)
8. La corrida des hippopotames casqués (1979)
9. Pour les intimes (1980)
10. Heureux qui, comme Cubitus (1981)
11. Raconte-moi, Cubitus (1982)
12. Tu le fais exprès ou quoi? (1983)
13. L'ami ne fait pas le moine (1984)
14. Cubitus et la boîte qui parle (1984)
15. Cubitus, tu nous fais marcher (1985)
16. Cubitus, chien fidèle (1986)
17. Cubitus, pas de salades (1986)
18. Cubitus, est-ce bien sérieux? (1987)
19. Cubitus, quand tu nous tiens!... (1988)
20. Cubitus, remets-nous ça (1989)
21. Toujours avec deux sucres (1989)
22. L'esprit égaré (1989)
23. Les enquêtes de l'inspecteur Cubitus (1990)
24. Cubitus, donne la belle papatte (1990)
25. Tout ça c'est des histoires (1991)
26. Cubitus, chien sans accroc (1991)
27. Cubitus se met au vert (1992)
28. Chat, ch'est du chien! (1992)
29. Copain toutes catégories (1993)
30. Cubitus fait toujours le beau (1993)
31. Cubitus, au poil près (1994)
32. Cubitus et les cumulus de Romulus (1994)
33. Cubitus mon chien quotidien (1995)
34. Un bouquet garni pour Cubitus (1996)
35. Chien indispensable (1997)
36. L'héritage du Pastaga (1998)
37. Cubitus ne mord jamais (1999)
38. Si tous les gags du monde... (2000)
39. Cubitus, ça n'arrive qu'à toi... (2001)
40. Tu te la coules douce... (2002)
41. Cubitus ...Vous êtes toujours timbré! (2004)

=== Les Nouvelles Aventures de Cubitus ===
1. En avant toute!! (2005)
2. Un chien peut en cacher un autre (2006)
3. En haut de la vague! (2007)
4. Tous des héros! (2008)
5. La Truffe dans le Guidon! (2009)
6. Mon chien à moi! (2010)
7. Cubitus fait son cinéma! (2011)
8. Le chat du radin (2012)
9. La guerre des boulons (2013)
10. L'école des chiens (2014)
11. Cubitus a tout inventé! (2015)
12. Super-héros! (2016)
13. Vu à la télé (2017)
14. À la poursuite du crayon fétich (2018)

== Short films ==
In 1977, the strip was adapted into an animated short film pilot by the Belgian studio Belvision, featuring the voices of André Gevrey, Georges Pradez and Guy Pion. The backgrounds were done by Michel Leloup. The film was released on VHS by Regie Cassette Video in the 1980s as a part of Les héros du journal de Tintin ("The Heroes of Tintin"), a compilation of animated short pilots adapted from comics from the Tintin magazine by Belvision, and broadcast on Radio-Québec's Ciné-cadeau on December 29, 1984 and January 1, 1986, and Télétoon in 2000.

On November 28, 1984, the strip was adapted into animated sequences on La bande à Bédé.

== Anime ==
In 1988, the strip was adapted into a Japanese cartoon series named Don Don: Domeru to Ron, which was re-titled as Wowser for US audiences. Dubbed by Saban Entertainment, it is the only part of Cubitus that has been translated into English.

In 2011, there were plans to adapt the strip into a new 3D computer animated series. The series was produced by Ellipsanime and Storimages.

== Impact ==
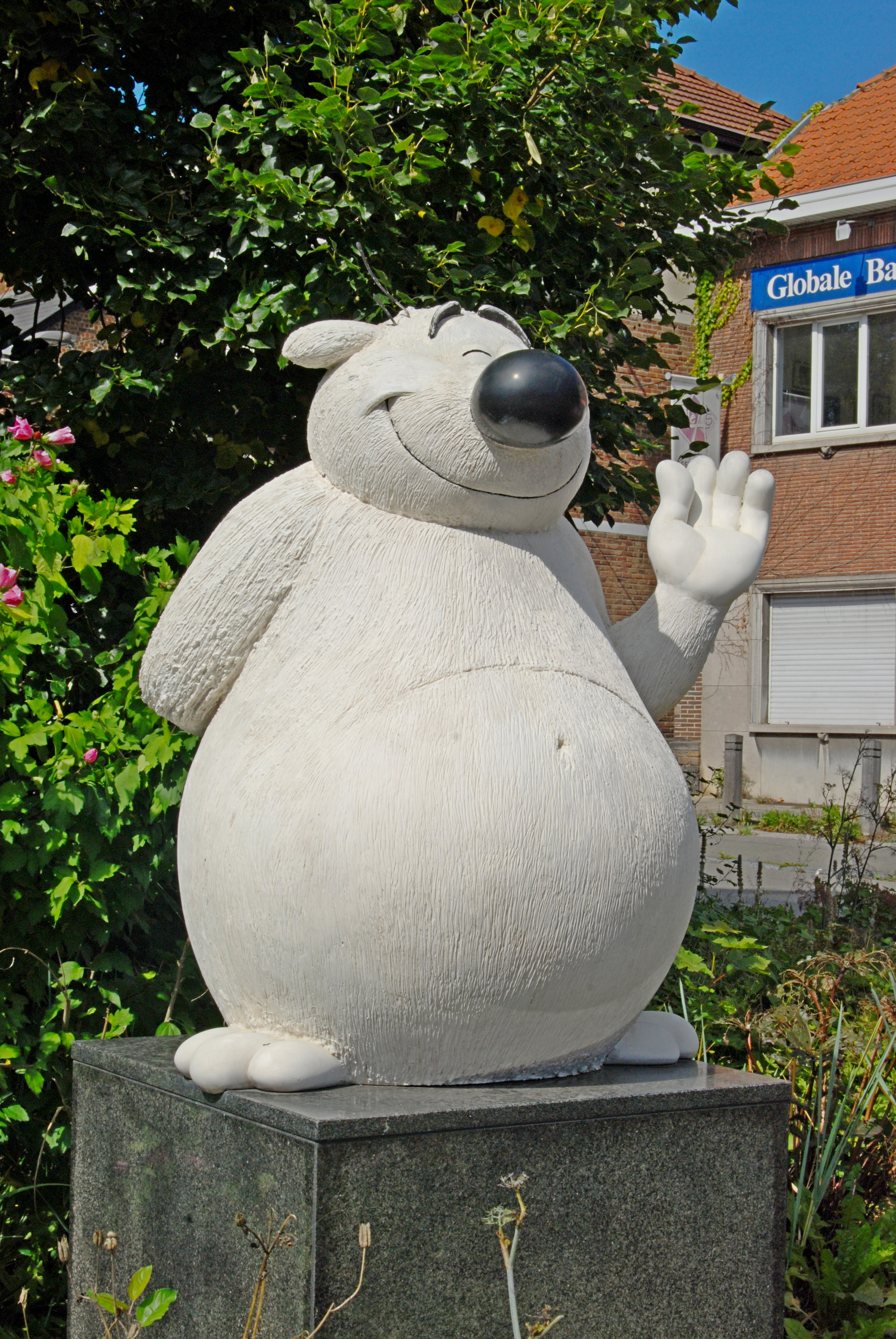
Statue of Cubitus in Limal

- Cubitus became one of the most popular comic characters in advertising, with merchandise produced in the form of figurines, plush toys and Pogs.
- In October 1994, La Poste issued a Cubitus stamp as part of its annual Philatélie de la Jeunesse ("Youth Philately") series. In 2004, a limited edition album, Cubitus ...Vous êtes toujours timbré! ("Cubitus ...You're Still Crazy!") was released to celebrate the 10th anniversary of the Philabédé collection. It featured the original stamp with a special commemorative cancellation mark. In September 2006, Cubitus and Sénéchal appeared on 10 self-adhesive stamps launched by La Poste.
- In October 1994, a mural painting of Cubitus temporarily dethroning Manneken Pis was designed by Georgios Oreopoulos and David Vandegeerde for Brussels' Comic Book Route.
- In 2000, a mural painting of Cubitus was designed as part of the Comic Book Route in Angoulême, located in the Rue de Montmoreau.
- A statue of Cubitus, sculpted by Yves Cauwenberghs and supervised by Michel Leloup, was erected on 3 October 2002 in Limal, where Dupa spent the last 30 years of his life.
- On October 7, 2005–October 16, 2005, RTBF sold Cubitus post-it notes and magnets as part of its CAP48 campaign.
- On June 15, 2009–December 15, 2009, Dupa's 1998 interpretation of the Loret organ in Wavre, featuring Cubitus, was on display at the "Orgue et BD" exhibition in Église Saint-Jean-Baptiste de Wavre.

== See also ==
• Marcinelle school
