= VTV (Dutch TV channel) =

Vesta TV
- Country: Netherlands
- Broadcast area: Netherlands

History
- Launched: 2 October 1995; 29 years ago
- Closed: 1 July 1996; 28 years ago (273 days)

VTV was a Dutch television station. It used to timeshare with Kindernet. It launched on 2 October 1995. The first letter "V" stood for Vesta, the Roman goddess of the hearth and home. The channel's main target were women aged between 20 and 40 years. Léonie Sazias was the main presenter. Due to its poor ratings VTV closed on 1 July 1996.

== Programming ==
- Another World
- Binnenste Buiten
- De Hort Op
- Lekker Lijf
- Ojevaarsjo
- Vita Vesta
- Voel Je Lekker
- Wie Kookt Er Vandaag?
