= Kindernet =

Former Dutch television channel

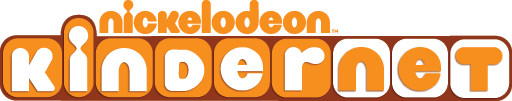
- Country: Netherlands
- Broadcast area: Netherlands
- Network: Nickelodeon (relaunch)

Programming
- Picture format: 16:9 576i (SDTV)

Ownership
- Owner: Viacom International Media Networks Northern Europe

History
- Launched: 1 March 1988; 38 years ago (original); 4 April 2011; 15 years ago (relaunch)
- Replaced: TMF Nederland (1995-2011)
- Closed: 7 December 2003; 22 years ago (original); 1 November 2013; 12 years ago (relaunch)
- Replaced by: Comedy Central going 24 hours a day (relaunch); Nick Jr. (Netherlands) (relaunch)

Links
- Website: www.kindernet.nl (archived)

Availability

Terrestrial
- Digitenne: Channel 12

Streaming media
- Ziggo GO: ZiggoGO.tv (Europe only)
- Canal Digitaal: Watch live (Netherlands only)
- TV Vlaanderen (Flanders): Watch live (Belgium only)

Kindernet (as Nickelodeon Kindernet from 2011 to 2013) was a Dutch television network that aired classic and modern children's television series from the 1980s onward.

Two iterations of the network have been broadcast; the original lasted from 1988 to 2003, while a Nickelodeon-branded return that launched in 2011 and ended in 2013 for two years.

== History ==
=== Original (1988–2003) ===
Kindernet started off as an idea by Dennis Livson, a Finnish producer and distributor of animated programmes in the 1970s. He believed that, at the time, children's programmes made for television were too violent for young viewers. He therefore started a network with so called "violence-free" cartoons. Its first logo reflected the childish aesthetic. The network is finally launched through satellite (Intelsat V 27.5 degrees West) and some cable networks on 1 March 1988. It was founded and owned by Livson's production company Telecable Benelux B.V. with financing by British retailer WHSmith and Japanese company Fuji Eight Co., Ltd., a former subsidiary of the Japanese media giant Fuji Television (now Fuji Media Holdings, Inc.). Because of most days, commercial television was not allowed by Dutch law, the Dutch network was broadcast via Luxembourg and England, and is considered to be the first commercial television network in the Netherlands.

At launch, Kindernet aired between 7.00 and 10.00 AM, timesharing on cable with other networks such as the Flemish BRT. On satellite, using Intelsat 5, at launch time, its channel capacity was timeshared with WHSTV's other channels, Lifestyle in the daytime and Screensport at night. Its slogan was "Kindernet, voor net uit bed" (Kindernet, to watch after bed). Due to negative criticism, it was changed to "Het programma waar u uw kinderen met een gerust hart alleen bij kunt laten" (The channel you can let your children watch with tranquility).

A rigorous half-hour schedule was created: at 7, broadcasts began with an hour of half-hour shows, followed by another half-hour aimed at preschoolers, with content such as the BRT series Tik Tak, short songs, magic tricks and others. The last hour from 9 was educational, with the Procidis Once Upon a Time franchise followed by a documentary at 9:30. On weekends, since children had no school, this slot was instead filled by live-action series.

Initially, the channel was commercial free, and worked in the following model: the cable companies delivered the signal through the payment of a 40-cent tax, per subscriber. This tax passed over to the subscribers and Kindernet received it on behalf of the provider. However, since private television was still banned in the Netherlands, Kindernet had to move to Luxembourg, establishing an office and a Dutch team there in charge of marketing. Eventually, the channel covered 70% of the Netherlands. In the early 90s, this initial model was deemed unsustainable, and Kindernet started airing commercials for the first time to increase revenue.

In 1995, the director of Kindernet launched VTV, which was aimed at female audiences. Both networks timeshared, though VTV was rather unsuccessful. Later, Kindernet would go on to timeshare with Discovery Channel and Net5 (from 2000 to 2002). The network then went through a rebranding, during which the name was changed to Kindernet 5 (corresponding to Net5).

By the end of the year in 2001, Kindernet was acquired by MTV Networks Europe (now rebranded and as a part of Paramount's international centre of networks), and shifted from Net5 to Veronica in September 2002. This takeover was expressed in the new logo for the network, which heavily resembled the pre-2009 Nickelodeon logo in terms of style and other variations. The last new show to come to Kindernet before this rebrand happened was Mumble Bumble. One year later, Kindernet was rebranded as Nickelodeon and ceased broadcast. On December 7 2003, Nickelodeon announced that it will may retire kindernet soon.

=== Return (2011–13) ===
On 4 April 2011, Kindernet was relaunched as part of the Nickelodeon family of networks, replacing TMF. It initially aired between 6.00 AM and 3.00 PM, sharing network space with Comedy Central. The revived network was a collaboration with Studio 100, which provided its catalogue of classics.

On 1 October 2012, Kindernet's airtime was decreased from 9 hours to 3 hours, now airing from 6.00 to 9.00 AM.

Kindernet officially shut down on 1 November 2013, allowing Comedy Central to expand in its place, instantly, its website was later redirected to the Nick Jr. Netherlands website.

== Programming ==
- Albert the Fifth Musketeer
- Alfred J. Kwak
- Argaï (2001-2002)
- Bananas in Pyjamas (2001-2002)
- Barbapapa
- Bassie & Adriaan
- Batfink
- Boes (1992-2002)
- Budgie the Little Helicopter
- Caillou (2001-2003)
- Calimero
- Colargol (1990)
- Dino Babies
- Dommel
- Doctor Snuggles
- Dora the Explorer (2003-2004)
- Earthworm Jim (1997-2002)
- Fat Dog Mendoza (2000-2002)
- Inspector Gadget
- Jellabies (1997-2004)
- Li'l Elvis and the Truckstoppers
- The Magic School Bus (1997-2003)
- Montana Jones (2000-2002)
- Mrs. Pepperpot (1990-2002)
- Mumble Bumble (2001-2003)
- The Neverending Story (1997)
- Nils Holgersson (1990-2002)
- Pinocchio
- The Raccoons
- Rolie Polie Olie (2000-2003)
- Rupert (1992-2003)
- Simsala Grimm
- Sinbad
- The Smurfs (1988-2002)
- Swiss Family Robinson (1988)
- Tales from the Cryptkeeper
- Teddy Ruxpin
- Thomas & Friends (2002-2003)
- Vicky the Viking
- Weird-Ohs (2000-2002)
- The World of David the Gnome
- Zoo Cup

=== Relaunch era ===
- The Adventures of Tintin
- Big & Betsy
- Dobus
- Heidi
- I.N.K.
- Lucky Luke
- Maya the Bee
- Rugrats
- Samson & Gert
- Snorks
- Zigby
- Wizzy & Woppy

== See also ==
- Pebble TV
