= Dupa =

Belgian comics artist (1945–2000)

- Luc Dupanloup
- Born: Luc Dupanloup; 12 February 1945 Montignies-sur-Sambre, Belgium
- Died: 8 November 2000 (aged 55) Ottignies, Belgium
- Areas: writer, musician, artist
- Notable works: Cubitus
- Awards: full list

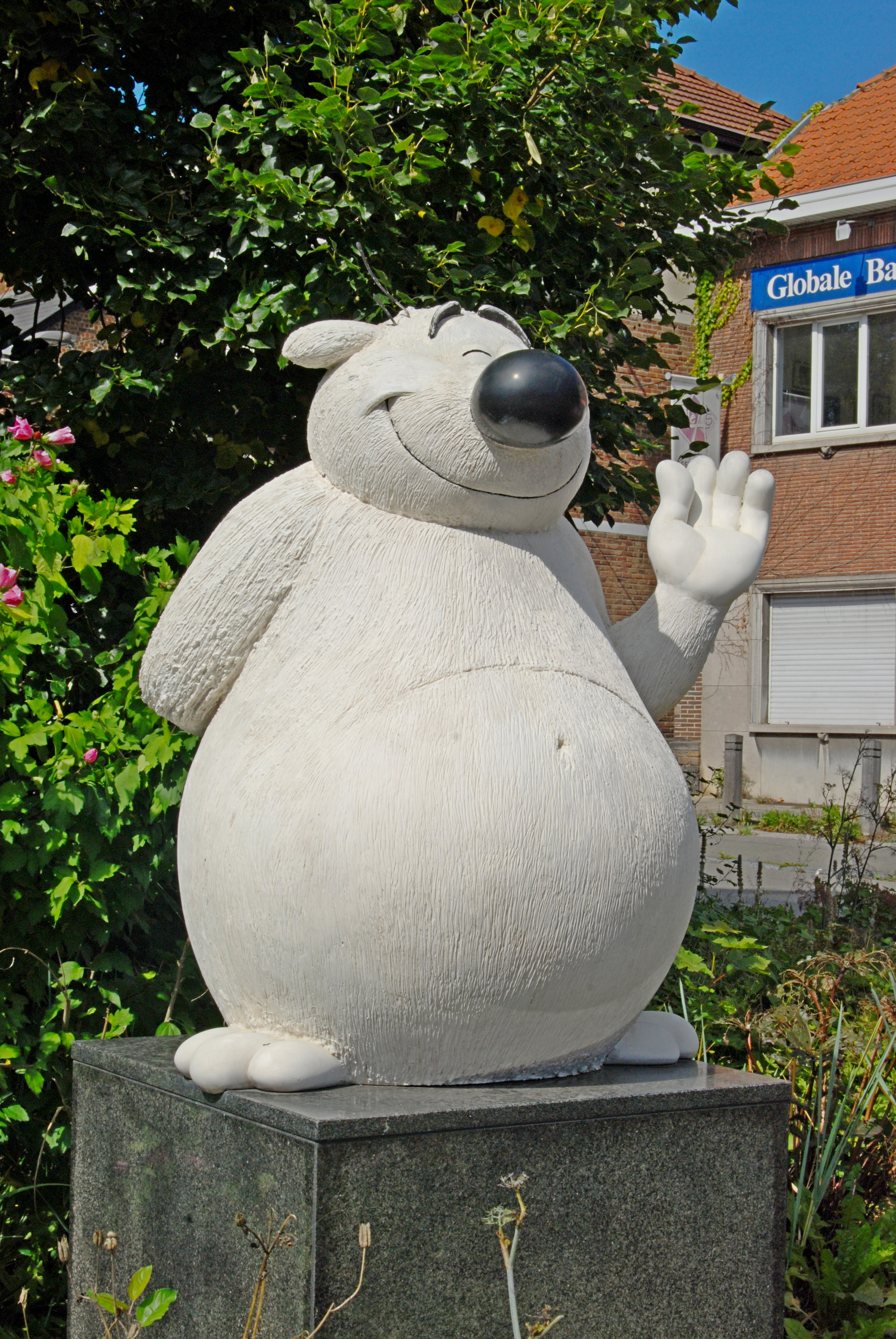
Statue of Cubitus in Limal.

Luc Dupanloup, more famous under his pen name Dupa, was a Belgian comics artist best known as the creator of Cubitus which later was turned into an animated series called Wowser. He was born on 12 February 1945 in Montignies-sur-Sambre and died on 8 November 2000 in Ottignies.

== Awards ==
- Crayon d'Argent in 1973
- Aigle d'Or de la Ville de Nice in 1982
- Prize of the best book for children at the BD de Paris convention in 1984
- "110 d'Or" price in November 1993 at the BD Festival of Illzach

== Bibliography ==
- Cubitus (43 albums) 1972–2000
- Chlorophylle (3 albums) 1973–1977
- Alice au pays des merveilles (1 album) 1973
- Constant Souci (1 album) 1974
- Coup d'oeil (1 album) 1984
- Niky (3 albums) 1985–1988
- Le Verrou (1 album) 1987
- Bédémix (2 albums) 1989
- Les Vacances de Petit Biniou (1 album) 1997
