= Jellabies =

- Also known as: Jellikins; The Jellies
- Genre: Children’s
- Written by: Jan Page
- Directed by: Ralph Tittley, Animation: Jonny Lewis (first 15 episodes)
- Narrated by: Rik Mayall
- Music by: David Lowe; Vo Fletcher
- Countries of origin: Australia (Jellabies); United Kingdom (Jellikins/Jellies)
- Original language: English
- No. of episodes: 97 (21 missing)

Production
- Producers: David Clement; Mike Prince
- Animators: Richard Smart; Tony Tinsley; Meena Kumari-Pai; Andy Day; Andrew Lindsay; Mikel G Lewis
- Running time: 5 mins
- Production companies: Optical Image Broadcast; Winchester Entertainment

Original release
- Network: ABC for Kids (Australia) GMTV (UK)
- Release: May 18, 1998 – 2001

Jellabies (also known as Jellikins or The Jellies) is an Australian-British children's animated television series that first aired on the British television network (GMTV), from 18 May 1998 until 2001. It was also shown in Canada (Treehouse TV), Germany (Super RTL), U.S. (Fox Family Channel, now as Freeform), The Netherlands (Kindernet), France (TF! Jeunesse), and Australia (ABC Kids). The series' target audience is children aged two to six.

It was one of the first television series to be produced fully in CGI.

== Format ==
The programme was conceived and developed in Worcestershire, UK by Jonny Lewis, a 3D artist/animator and Optical Image Ltd, a small TV/video editing house, using CGI animation. The show was narrated by Rik Mayall. The Jellabies are jelly-made children that live in the Jolly Jelly World, which is the magical land at the end of the rainbow, where their main job is to make rainbows (for which they have a machine called the Jelliscope, a computer/teleporter/rainbow generator that is constantly monitoring weather conditions around the world). Although each Jellaby has their own vehicle to drive around in, their main use of travelling long distances around Jelly Land is the "Jelly Train", a train that only consists of a cab (without any actual locomotive) and one passenger car. The show premiered in 1998 and ended in early 2003.

Jellabies are also known as Jellikins in certain parts of the world, including the United Kingdom. This version is exactly the same as the Jellabies in every way, except the characters' heads were changed to look like gummy bears. However, Duffy the dragon remained the same. This version aired on GMTV in the United Kingdom until January 2004.

== History ==
Jonny Lewis designed and created the characters and developed the pilot episode with his brother Mikel Lewis, using 3D Studio Max. It was loosely based on Jelly Babies candies. In the early months, before funding, Jonny Lewis lived in a dusty basement in Malvern so he could afford to develop the show on his home PC. The pilot led to the series being commissioned by GMTV and then in many other countries around the world. It was the first British fully 3D computer-animated series to make it on to television.

Optical Image sealed sponsorship from Basset's. Other animators who made significant input were Meena Kamurai Pai, Andrew Lindsay, Richard Smart, Andy Day, Ian Friend, Harjit Birdi, making each episode with only five days to complete each one in order to meet the schedule.

Music written and composed by Dave Lowe and Vo Fletcher.

== Characters and voice cast ==
The main characters represent the colours of the rainbow, and speak in some form of gibberish (although Duffy has a distinct growl-like voice).

- Narrator (Rik Mayall)
- Pepper – Lives in a treehouse, and is red. Carries a backpack with paintbrushes.
- Bouncey – Lives in a bumper car, and is yellow. Has a mischievous and energetic personality.
- Denny – Lives in a boat on the Jelly Lake, and is blue. Fairly laid-back and usually wears a vest.
- Strum – Lives at the train station, and is purple. He is the musical Jellaby who plays the saxophone, and is the most level-headed of the Jellabies.
- Amber - Lives in a hot air balloon, and is orange. In the Jellikins, she also wears a knit hat.
- Coral – Amber's twin sister who lives in a house made out of building blocks and is pink.
- Duffy – The only non-Jellaby character in the series. He is a green dragon who lives in the Jelly Caves.

== Episodes ==
=== Season 1 (1998-99) ===
1. Caterpillar

2. Circus

3. Pepper's Den

4. Hide and Seek

5. Apple

6. Seeds

7. Burst Balloon

8. Snow

9. Music

10. Drum

11. Drumsticks

12. Waiting

=== Season 2 (1999) ===
1. Birthday

2. Echoes

3. Sky

4. Egg

5. Monster

6. Sheep

=== Season 3 (1999) ===
1. Train Trouble

2. Balloon

3. Jack in the Box

4. Lost Voice

5. Sneezes

6. Invisible

7. Runaway Train

8. Rescue

9. Seal

10. Super Jelly

11. Bridge

12. Race

13. Captain Jellybeard

=== Season 4 (1999) ===
1. Shadow

2. Sun

3. Jelly Day

4. Animals

5. Jelly Lake

6. Jellyphone

=== Season 5 (1999) ===
1. Shipwreck

2. Cave In!

3. Bouncy Ball

4. Camping

5. Tobbogan

6. Jelly Dance

7. Fancy Dress

8. Obstacles

9. Football

10. Sounds

11. Caves

12. House

13. Twins

=== Season 6 (1999) ===
1. Night

2. Bouncing

3. Butterfly

4. Parrot

5. Spring

=== Season 7 (1999-2000) ===
1. Baa!

3. Autumn

4. Nature

5. Zebra

6. Big

7. Magic

8. Where's Pepper?

9. Hot

10. Robot

11. Wheels

12. Chums

=== Season 8 (2000) ===
1. Rubbish

2. Silly Sax

3. Small

4. High

5. Tower

6. Footprints

7. Yuk

=== Season 9 (2000-2001) ===
1. Jelly Disco

2. Mountain

4. Jelly Christmas (special)

5. Paint

6. Feelings Rhyme

=== Newscreen era (2001) ===
𝘤𝘰𝘮𝘱𝘭𝘦𝘵𝘦 𝘦𝘱𝘪𝘴𝘰𝘥𝘦 𝘭𝘪𝘴𝘵 𝘢𝘯𝘥 𝘰𝘳𝘥𝘦𝘳 𝘶𝘯𝘤𝘰𝘯𝘧𝘪𝘳𝘮𝘦𝘥, 𝘦𝘱𝘪𝘴𝘰𝘥𝘦𝘴 𝘸𝘪𝘵𝘩𝘰𝘶𝘵 𝘳𝘦𝘧𝘦𝘳𝘦𝘯𝘤𝘦 𝘢𝘳𝘦 𝘪𝘯 𝘵𝘩𝘦 𝘱𝘦𝘳𝘴𝘰𝘯𝘢𝘭 𝘤𝘰𝘭𝘭𝘦𝘤𝘵𝘪𝘰𝘯 𝘰𝘧 𝘋𝘰𝘳𝘢𝘋𝘶𝘣𝘴 𝘗𝘳𝘰𝘥𝘶𝘤𝘵𝘪𝘰𝘯𝘴 𝘰𝘯 𝘠𝘰𝘶𝘛𝘶𝘣𝘦

Strum's Concert

Hats (all characters have a version)

Magic Seeds

Painting

=== Unconfirmed episodes ===
Fair

Coral's Pet

Jungle

Kangaroo

== Theme song ==
The theme song Wobbly World Theme written by David Lowe and Vo Fletcher which featured an opening narration by Rik Mayall. The song adds with a Caribbean flavour.

== CD release ==
In 1999, a CD was released titled Jellikins: Songs from the TV series which featured songs performed by Mayall.

== Ride(s) ==
Since 2000, there has been a Jellikins roller coaster at British theme park, Fantasy Island. Amutec had rights to make a Jellikins coin-operated ride featuring Bouncey in his bumper car from 2001 up until a currently unknown year/date.

== International broadcast ==
=== North America ===
- (United States) USA
  - Fox Family Channel (now as Freeform)
- Canada
  - Treehouse TV

=== Oceania ===
- Australia
  - ABC For Kids
- New Zealand
  - TV2

=== Asia ===
- Philippines
  - RPN
- South Korea
  - Seoul Broadcasting System
- Taiwan
  - EBC Yoyo

=== Middle East ===
- Iran
  - IRIB TV5

=== Europe ===
- United Kingdom
  - GMTV
  - Fox Kids
- France
  - TF! Jeunesse
- Germany
  - Super RTL
- The Netherlands
  - Kindernet
  - Nickelodeon (Nick Jr.)
- Italy
  - RAI
