= Kizzy (entertainer) =

Dutch actress, singer and television host

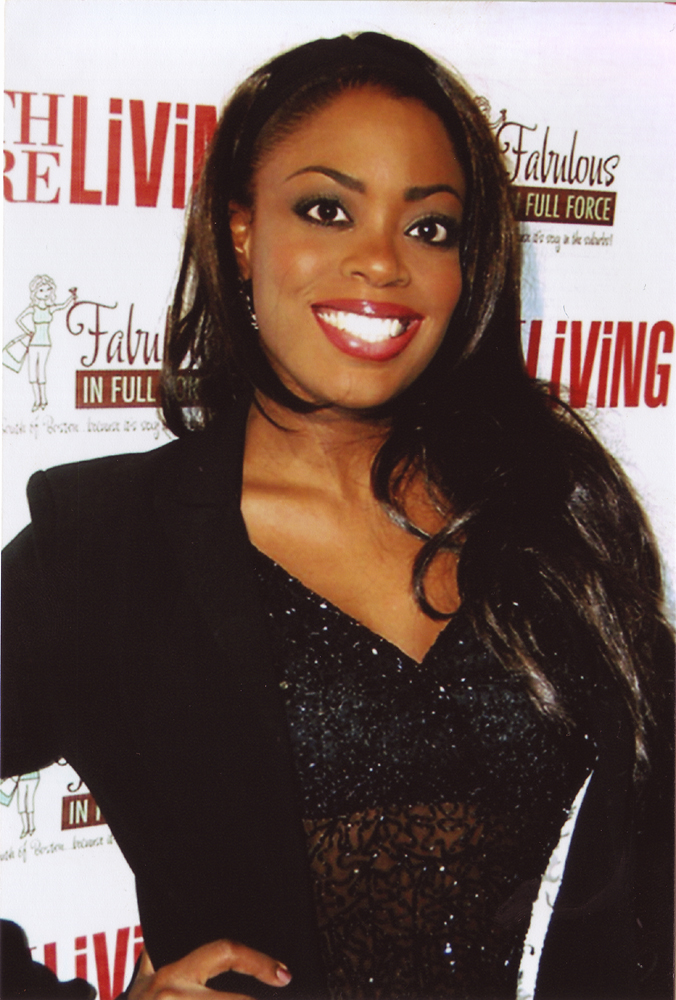
- Kizzy in 2007
- Born: Kizzy Yuanda Constance Getrouw; 14 March 1979 (age 47); Rotterdam, Netherlands
- Occupations: Actress, singer, songwriter, television host, poet
- Years active: 2003–present
- Website: www.kizzy.nl

Kizzy Yuanda Constance Getrouw (born 14 March 1979) is a Dutch actress, singer and television host who performs mononymously as Kizzy. She became a household name in the Netherlands Antilles with hit songs and TV shows. In the United States, she presented TV shows on both The Gossip Swapp on XY TV and CN8. Her best known poems are Supervrouwen and Cel Voor Cel. Kizzy currently presents kids TV shows.

== Early years ==
Kizzy was born in Rotterdam to a Surinamese father and an Antillean mother (Sint Eustatius). At the age of four, her family moved to the Caribbean island of Curaçao. Starting at the age of nine, she had lead roles in various televised musicals and plays, and won numerous talent competitions including De Soundmix Showand The European Caribbean Talent Contest in 1995. In the following year won the National Song Festival thus she became the representative of the Netherlands Antilles at the Caribbean Song Festival in Barbados, finishing in second place. Moreover, she performed at award shows, beauty pageants and sang the national anthem for presidential and big sports events, including The Caribbean Olympics and the Andruw Jones Awards.

== Career ==
Kizzy's career took off in 1997 with the success of the hit album Lamu-Lamu, which became a number one selling album in the Netherlands Antilles. She also became the host of Wie is er Nieuwsgierig? a successful kids TV show.

In 1998, Kizzy was signed to German label TMP. During the recording sessions in Mallorca she was accepted at Berklee College of Music on a full scholarship. Kizzy moved to Boston. Her German CD was not released. While at Berklee she studied ballet and musical theater at the Boston Conservatory, and acting at Emerson College.

In the summer of 1999 Kizzy flew to Amsterdam to host and perform at the Kwakoe Festival, the Netherlands' biggest annual multicultural festival. She recorded the official commercial that was used to promote the event and the producers of Radio Wereld Omroep in Hilversum recorded a documentary of her career that was aired on TV.

Prior to graduating from Berklee College of Music in 2003 with a degree in Performance, she was featured at the college's most prestigious concerts such as Tribute to David Bowie Commencement Concert, Singer's Showcase and The Berklee Gospel Choir. She performed as a backup vocalist for artists such as Steven Tyler (Aerosmith), Al Kooper, Grammy nominee Susan Tedeschi, and Grammy award winner Kim Burrell.

Around the same time, Kizzy appeared on the VH1 TV series Sound Affects. In addition, she was featured on the cover of The Improper Bostonian Magazine. In 2005, Kizzy became the lead singer of the Bo Winiker Orchestra with whom she performed for Bill Clinton, Glenn Close and with whom she gained critical acclaim for performing songs in Hebrew.

In 2006, she became a reporter on "The VIP" and the host of "Gossip Swap" on XYTV and in 2007 she became an entertainment reporter on Dirty Water TV. She was the face of several TV commercials and was the host and a jury member at the Miss Boston 2008 competition.

Kizzy moved back to the Netherlands in 2009.

In 2011, she performed her published poem "Nederland Schreeuwt om Kunst en Cultuur" at the official televised Nederland Schreeuwt om Cultuur' event. The first single of her solo album was called This Bed Ain't Big Enough and was released in October 2012. On 5 November 2012 Kizzy's solo album was released. The album Unspoken Rhyme was produced by Robert Jansen and multiple award-winning producer Piet Souer.

In 2013, performed in shows as the Delft Jazz Festival and she flew to Curaçao with her band to perform at the Curaçao North Sea Jazz Festival, alongside artists as Prince and Luis Minguel.

In 2014, she was the host at the annual Miss Valentine competition, Goois Jazzfestival, and the "International Women's Day" event, where she performed her poem 'Internationale Vrouwendag' (International Women's Day). Kizzy started presenting a Dutch kids television show on Open Rotterdam in 2017. She performed during the Women's March in the Hague and was invited to recite her poem Supervrouwen for Queen Maxima of the Netherlands during the Joke Smit Awards.

== Filmography ==
- Wie is er Nieuwsgierig? (1997)
- Sound Affects (2001)
- The VIP (2004–2006)
- The Gossip Swapp (2006)
- Dirty Water (2007–2008)
- OPENBOEK (2017)

== Discography ==
- Cocktail, Lamu – Lamu (1997)
- Unspoken Rhyme (2012)
- Have Yourself A Merry Little Christmas (2013)
