= Pebble TV =

Dutch children's television channel

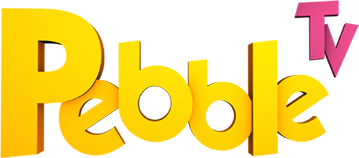
- Country: Netherlands
- Broadcast area: Netherlands; Belgium

Programming
- Language: Dutch
- Picture format: 16:9 576i (SDTV)

History
- Launched: 12 November 2009; 16 years ago
- Closed: 3 November 2025
- Replaced by: Storyzoo and Friends

Links
- Website: www.pebbletv.nl www.pebbletv.be

Pebble TV was a Dutch television channel in the Netherlands and Belgium, which is aimed at children and airs children's programs from the past. The channel broadcasts 24 hours a day. The station began its test broadcasts on 29 October 2009. The official first broadcast was 12 November 2009. Founder is former Kindernet director Henk Krop. Co-initiator is Bas van Toor, better known as the Clown Bassie.

Pebble TV avoids imagery with a strong visual impact, instead broadcasting substantive programs where the visuals serve to illustrate the story. Intense visual stimuli that might make children restless are avoided. On November 3, 2025, Pebble TV was rebranded in the afternoon as the new channel StoryZoo & Friends, following the channel's acquisition by the founders of StoryZoo.

== See also ==
- Kindernet
