= Marieke Elsinga =

Dutch radio host and television presenter

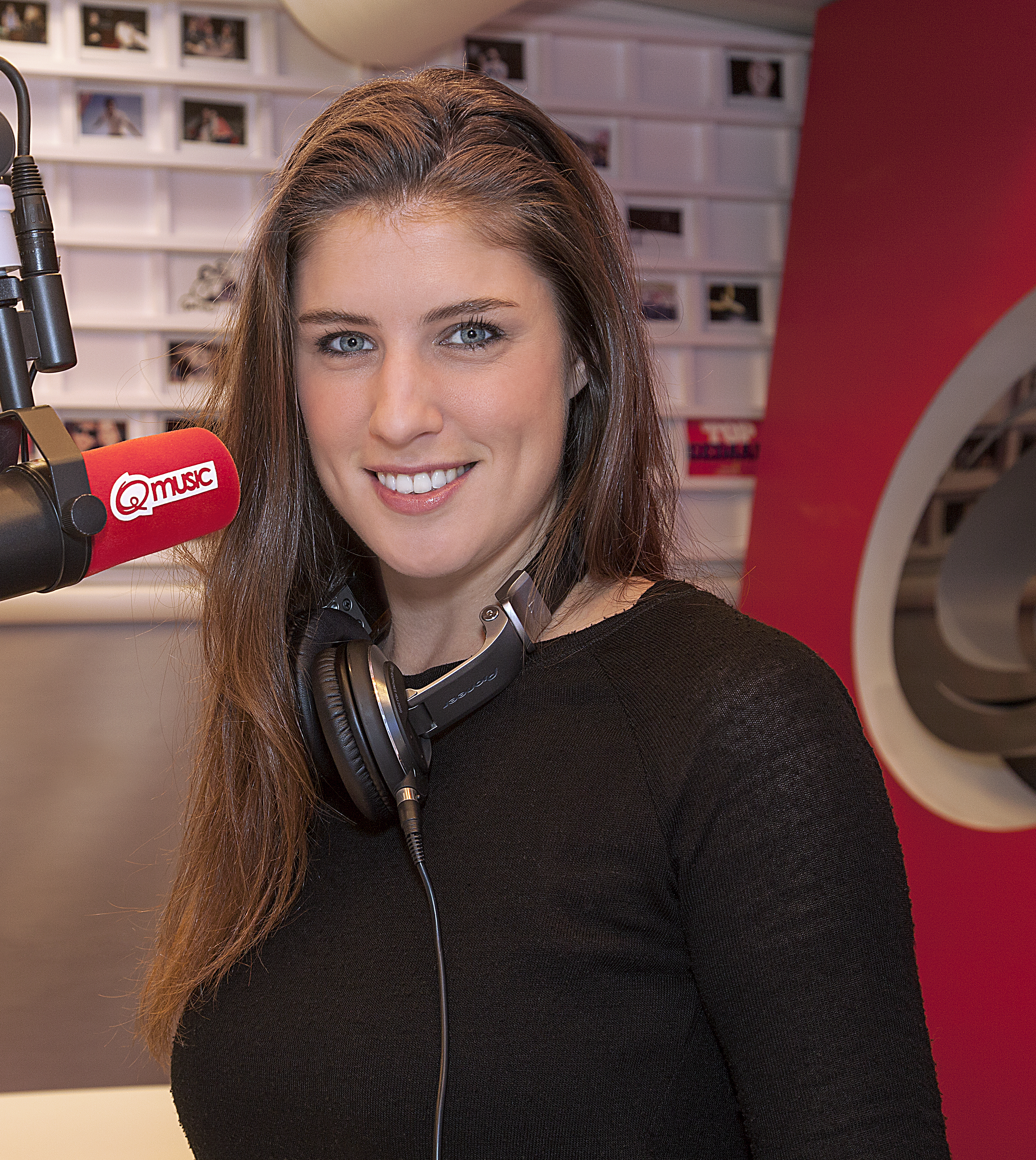
- Elsinga in 2013
- Born: 12 July 1986 (age 40); Gouda, Netherlands
- Occupations: Radio host; Television presenter

Marieke Elsinga (born 12 July 1986) is a Dutch radio host and television presenter. She is known for co-hosting the morning radio show Mattie & Marieke with Mattie Valk. She was a panel member in the television show I Can See Your Voice. Elsinga has presented several television shows, including Alles is Muziek, The Jump and The Headliner.

== Career ==
=== Radio ===
In 2014, she was nominated for a Marconi Award in the category Aanstormend talent ('Rising talent'). In the same year, she was also nominated for the Philip Bloemendal Prijs.

From September 2018 to September 2026, Elsinga and Mattie Valk presented the morning radio show Mattie & Marieke on the radio station Qmusic. The show won the 2021 Gouden RadioRing award. They signed a new multi-year contract with Qmusic in 2020. They also signed a new contract in 2023. In 2019, she won the 2018 Zilveren RadioSter Vrouw award for best female DJ. She also won the Zilveren RadioSter Vrouw in 2020 and 2021. In 2024, Miljuschka Witzenhausen became co-host of the show during Elsinga's maternity leave.

Starting in January 2026, the radio show by Marieke Elsinga and Mattie Valk also aired on the television channel RTL 7. Their radio show ended in September 2026. Valk became the host of the radio show Hey Mattie! and Elsinga began presenting her own radio show on Friday afternoon.

=== Television ===
In 2016, Elsinga became sidekick in the show RTL Late Night presented by Humberto Tan. She succeeded Luuk Ikink in this role. She was a presenter in the show RTL Boulevard from 2017 to 2022. In 2018, she presented the second season of the dating show Adam Zkt. Eva VIPS.

Elsinga presented the first season of the show Crime Desk in 2021 with John van den Heuvel and Mick van Wely as crime reporters. She was one of the team captains in the 2022 show Fout maar goud, a game show about guilty pleasures. In 2023, Elsinga presented the television show Alles is Muziek in which two teams compete by recreating songs using everyday objects. The show ended after six episodes as a result of disappointing viewing figures. She presented the first season of the quiz show The Jump in 2023 and the second season in 2025.

Elsinga and Jim Bakkum presented the talent show The Headliner in 2025. She did not present the first four episodes of the show as she was on maternity leave during the filming of these episodes. She returned to RTL Boulevard in the summer of 2025 in the evening edition titled RTL Boulevard Summernight.

In 2026, she became one of the presenters of the ninth season of the show Kopen Zonder Kijken after Martijn Krabbé was no longer able to present the show due to his health. Krabbé did the voice-over and the show was presented by multiple presenters. In the show, people purchase a home without having seen it first and the team of Kopen Zonder Kijken makes all relevant decisions based on budget and preferences.

Elsinga returned to the show RTL Boulevard in autumn of 2026.

=== Television appearances ===
Elsinga appeared in 2017 episodes of the shows Wie ben ik? and De Grote Improvisatieshow. She also competed in the 2017 season of the show Expeditie Robinson. Elsinga was a contestant in the 2018 season of the singing competition show It Takes 2.

Elsinga and Mattie Valk were contestants in a 2021 episode of the game show Oh, wat een jaar!. She appeared in the 2023 season of the show The Masked Singer. Elsinga also appeared in a 2024 episode of the quiz show De Pappenheimers presented by Erik Van Looy.

== Personal life ==
Elsinga gave birth to a son in November 2022. She gave birth to a daughter in August 2024.

== Awards ==
- Televizier Talent Award (2017)
- Zilveren RadioSter Vrouw (2018)
- Zilveren RadioSter Vrouw (2019)
- Zilveren RadioSter Vrouw (2020)
- Gouden RadioRing (2021, for the radio show Mattie & Marieke with Mattie Valk)

== Filmography ==
=== As presenter ===
- RTL Boulevard (2017–2022)
- Adam Zkt. Eva VIPS (2018)
- Crime Desk (2021)
- Alles is Muziek (2023)
- The Jump (2023, 2025)
- The Headliner (2025)
- RTL Boulevard Summernight (2025)
- Kopen Zonder Kijken (2026)

=== As sidekick / co-host ===
- RTL Late Night (2016–2017)

=== As team captain ===
- Fout maar goud (2022)

=== As panel member ===
- I Can See Your Voice (2020–2023)

=== As contestant ===
- Wie ben ik? (2017)
- Expeditie Robinson (2017)
- It Takes 2 (2018)
- Oh, wat een jaar! (2021)
- The Masked Singer (2023)
- De Pappenheimers (2024)
- The House of Hide and Seek (2026)

=== As herself ===
- De Grote Improvisatieshow (2017)
- Casa di Beau (2025)

=== As voice actor ===
- The Angry Birds Movie 2 (2019, Ella)
