= I Can See Your Voice (Dutch game show) =

Dutch television game show

- Genre: Game show
- Based on: I Can See Your Voice by CJ ENM
- Directed by: Gerben van den Hoven
- Presented by: Carlo Boszhard
- Starring: The celebrity panelists (see cast)
- Country of origin: Netherlands
- Original language: Dutch
- No. of seasons: 5
- No. of episodes: Regular: 38; Special: 2; Overall: 40

Production
- Executive producers: Loes Griekspoor
- Producers: Lieke Potters; Stanley Schrurs; Michiel van der Hoeven; Anouk van Tol; Marlous Westerveld
- Editors: Lisanne Grob; Ivo Nijland; Dyonne Onyema; Ashley Sarink; Britt Verschuren; Esther Versluis; Rebecca Wijma
- Camera setup: Multi-camera
- Production company: Warner Bros. International Television Production

Original release
- Network: RTL 4
- Release: 29 October 2020 – 7 December 2023

Related
- I Can See Your Voice franchise

I Can See Your Voice is a Dutch television mystery music game show based on the South Korean programme of the same title, featuring its format where guest artist(s) and contestant(s) attempt to eliminate bad singers from the group, until the last mystery singer remains for a duet performance. It first aired on RTL 4 on 29 October 2020.

== Gameplay ==
=== Format ===
Over the course of four rounds, the guest artist and contestant(s) must attempt to eliminate bad singers from a group of "mystery singers", identified only by their occupation or alias, without ever hearing them perform live. They are assisted by clues regarding the singers' backgrounds, style of performance, and observations from a celebrity panel. At the end of a game, the last remaining mystery singer is revealed as either good or bad by means of a duet between them and one of the guest artists. (Note: Gameplay notes: The number of mystery singers are set to six (for the 1st season) or seven (from 2nd to 5th season).; The number of contestants are set to one (from 1st to 5th season) or a group of two (for the 5th season).)

From first to third season, if the last remaining mystery singer is good, the contestant(s) win €5,000; this is also applied to the winning bad singer selected by them.

From fourth to fifth season, the contestant(s) must eliminate one mystery singer at the end of each round, receiving €1,000 if they eliminate a bad singer. At the end of a game, if the contestant(s) decide to walk away, they will keep the money had won in previous rounds; if they decide to risk for the last remaining mystery singer, they win €7,500 if a singer is good, or lose their all winnings if a singer is bad.

=== Rounds ===
==== Visual round ====
- First impression (Dutch: Eerste indruk)

s1–4: The guest artist and contestant(s) are given some time to observe and examine each mystery singer based on their appearance.

==== Lip sync round ====
- Lip sync (Dutch: Lipsynchronisatie)

s1–4: Each mystery singer performs a lip sync to a song; good singers mime to a recording of their own, while bad singers mime to a backing track by another vocalist.

==== Evidence round ====
- Witness (Dutch: Bewijs)

s1–4: The guest artist and contestant(s) are presented with a video package containing possible clues by one of the mystery singers.

==== Rehearsal round ====
- Secret studio (Dutch: Geheime studio)

s2–4: The guest artist and contestant(s) presented with video from a recording session by one of the mystery singers, but pitch-shifted to obscure their actual vocals.

==== Interrogation round ====
- Interrogation (Dutch: De ondervraging)

s1: The guest artist and contestant(s) may ask questions to the remaining mystery singers. Good singers are required to give truthful responses, while the bad singers must lie.

== Production ==
Following the success of The Masked Singer, RTL Nederland formally acquired the rights to produce a Dutch adaptation of I Can See Your Voice in March 2020, with Warner Bros. International Television Production assigning on production duties.

== Broadcast history ==
I Can See Your Voice had originally scheduled to debut on 8 May 2020, which was postponed until it began airing on 29 October 2020, with filming taking place at Mediahaven in Amsterdam. At that time during the COVID-19 pandemic, the show has been produced since then until the second season, with health and safety protocols implemented.

One day after first season finale, RTL 4 has already renewed for a second season, with production moving to Studio's Aalsmeer; it premiered on 22 April 2021, until the conclusion with Silver Metz playing in a kids special on 10 June 2021.

The third season premiere originally scheduled for 17 February 2022, began airing earlier on 21 January 2022, as a sudden replacement to the prematurely ended 12th season of The Voice of Holland due to a sexual misconduct controversy. It was then followed by a fourth season, which premiered on 31 August 2022, and concluded with Francis van Broekhuizen playing in a holiday special on 22 December 2022.

In May 2023, RTL 4 renewed the series for a fifth season, with production returning to Mediahaven; originally scheduled to premiere on 31 August 2023, it was pushed back later to 19 October 2023.

== Cast ==
The series employs a panel of celebrity "detectives" who assist the guest artists and contestants in identifying good and bad mystery singers throughout the game. Along with regular members, guest panelists also appear since the first season. Overall, seven celebrities have served as panelists, with their original lineup consisting of Marieke Elsinga, Ronnie Flex, Samantha Steenwijk, Jeroen van Koningsbrugge, and Fred van Leer. Later members who joined the group's duties also include Danny de Munk and Edsilia Rombley — from the 2nd season.

Designations:
H Hosting duties
g# Total games attended, by panelists

Cast member	Seasons				
Cast member	1	2	3	4	5
Carlo Boszhard	H	H	H	H	H
Marieke Elsinga	8	7	10	7	8
Ronnie Flex	6				
Samantha Steenwijk	8				
Jeroen van Koningsbrugge	8				
Fred van Leer	8	7	10	7	8
Danny de Munk		7	10		7
Edsilia Rombley		7	10	6	

== Series overview ==
Series	Episodes	Originally released		Good singers	Bad singers
Series	Episodes	First released	Last released	Good singers	Bad singers
1	8	29 October 2020	17 December 2020	6	2
2	6	22 April 2021	3 June 2021	3	3
3	10	21 January 2022	25 March 2022	6	4
4	6	31 August 2022	5 October 2022	2	4
5	8	19 October 2023	7 December 2023	2	2
Sp	2	10 June 2021	22 December 2022	1	1

== Episodes ==
=== Season 1 (2020) ===
List of season 1 episodes
No. overall	No. in season	Guest artist(s)	Player order (Note: It refers to the guest artist(s) that have played in according to their first game; returning guest artists (which also include foreigners or former good singers, with their names displaying in italics) are not counted.)	Contestant	Original release date	NLD viewers (millions)	NLD share (national)
1	1	OG3NE	1	Anneke	29 October 2020	2.338	15.8%
2	2	Edsilia Rombley	2	Valerie	5 November 2020	2.284	17.5%
3	3	Danny de Munk	3	Demi	12 November 2020	2.468	20.1%
4	4	Trijntje Oosterhuis	4	Nicky Roeg	19 November 2020	2.326	20.2%
5	5	Gerard Joling	5	Melvin	26 November 2020	2.414	23%
6	6	Dave von Raven	6	Viola	3 December 2020	2.287	21.9%
7	7	Romy Monteiro	7	Lars	10 December 2020	2.127	20%
8	8	Emma Heesters	8	Sabrina	17 December 2020	2.35	21.3%

=== Season 2 (2021) ===
List of season 2 episodes
No. overall	No. in season	Guest artist(s)	Player order	Contestant	Original release date	NLD viewers (millions)	NLD share (national)
9	1	Glennis Grace	9	Marianne	22 April 2021	2.282	18.1%
10	2	Francis van Broekhuizen	10	Nick	29 April 2021	2.404	21.6%
11	3	Glen Faria	11	Farid	6 May 2021	2.183	21.4%
12	4	Jim Bakkum	12	Svenja	13 May 2021	2.18	24%
13	5	René Froger	13	Ann	27 May 2021	2.441	23.6%
14	6	Berget Lewis	14	Marjorie	3 June 2021	2.008	20.5%

=== Season 3 (2022) ===
List of season 3 episodes
No. overall	No. in season	Guest artist(s)	Player order	Contestant	Original release date	NLD viewers (millions)	NLD share (national)
15	1	Jan Smit	16	Shirley	21 January 2022	2.5	17.5%
16	2	Jeroen van der Boom	17	Linda	28 January 2022	2.673	19.9%
17	3	Anita Meyer	18	Stephan	4 February 2022	2.359	18.1%
18	4	Donnie	19	Jaco	11 February 2022	2.267	18.1%
19	5	Ruth Jacott (Note: Foreign guest artists: Curaçao — Tania Kross; Indonesia — Patty Brard (of Luv'); Suriname — Ruth Jacott)	20	Dhiraj	18 February 2022	2.281	17.2%
20	6	Frans Duijts	21	Tony	25 February 2022	2.109	17.1%
21	7	Nielson	22	Eliana	4 March 2022	2.205	16.4%
22	8	Jake Reese	23	Robin	11 March 2022	2.005	16.4%
23	9	Mart Hoogkamer	24	Melissa	18 March 2022	2.101	19.3%
24	10	Patty Brard (Luv')	25	Stacey	25 March 2022	2.112	17.7%

=== Season 4 (2022) ===
List of season 4 episodes
No. overall	No. in season	Guest artist(s)	Player order	Contestant	Original release date	NLD viewers (millions)	NLD share (national)
25	1	Wolter Kroes	26	Richard	31 August 2022	1.618	15.2%
26	2	Trijntje Oosterhuis	—	Nina	7 September 2022	1.507	14.2%
27	3	Jamai Loman	27	Ysabel	14 September 2022	1.446	14.2%
28	4	Edsilia Rombley	—	Emma	21 September 2022	1.623	15%
29	5	Buddy Vedder	28	Tarini	28 September 2022	1.711	16.4%
30	6	Emma Heesters	—	Tom	5 October 2022	1.71	15.2%

=== Season 5 (2023) ===
List of season 5 episodes
No. overall	No. in season	Guest artist(s)	Player order	Contestant(s)	Original release date	NLD viewers (millions)	NLD share (national)
31	1	Jelka van Houten	29	Simone	19 October 2023	1.575	18.4%
32	2	Tania Kross	30	Jordy	26 October 2023	1.39	12.6%
33	3	Thomas Berge	31	Danielle and Monique	2 November 2023	1.515	14.1%
34	4	Vajèn van den Bosch	32	Marloes and Romany	9 November 2023	1.431	13.7%
35	5	Roel van Velzen	33	Nelson	16 November 2023	1.42	13.8%
36	6	Soy Kroon	34	Yannick and Maurice	23 November 2023	1.732	16%
37	7	Danny de Munk	—	Arjun	30 November 2023	1.569	16.4%
38	8	Mart Hoogkamer	—	Nancy and Brigitte	7 December 2023	1.688	18.8%

=== Specials ===
List of special episodes
No.	Title	Guest artist(s)	Player order	Contestant	Original release date	NLD viewers (millions)	NLD share (national)
1	"Kids special"	Silver Metz	15	—	10 June 2021	1.594	19.3%
2	"Holiday special"	Francis van Broekhuizen	—	Astrid	22 December 2022	1.993	18.2%
