= Colour All My Days =

1986 studio album by Limahl

Studio album by Limahl
- Released: 14 July 1986
- Recorded: October–December 1985
- Studios: Musicland (Munich, Germany); Union (Munich, Germany)
- Genre: Synth-pop
- Length: 40:02
- Label: EMI
- Producers: Limahl; Giorgio Moroder; Derek Nakamoto

Limahl chronology
| Don't Suppose (1984) | Colour All My Days (1986) | Love Is Blind (1992) |

Singles from Colour All My Days
- 1. "Love in Your Eyes" Released: 21 April 1986; 2. "Inside to Outside" Released: 1986

Colour All My Days is the second studio album by the English singer-songwriter Limahl, released on 14 July 1986 by EMI Records.

== Overview ==
Following the international success of "The NeverEnding Story", the main theme to the film of the same name, in 1986, Limahl's second album was mostly produced by Giorgio Moroder (except for a couple of tracks, by Derek Nakamoto), who already produced the former smash hit. Moroder also provided the music to seven out of the ten tracks on the album, while Limahl himself wrote all but one of the lyrics (he also co-wrote the music for two tracks and played keyboard on two other tracks). The only track he did not actually contribute to was "Inside to Outside", the second single taken from the album, which was written by Colin Pearson and Achim Opperman. Though this song was a complete commercial flop for Limahl (it was actually released twice, the second time in a more spirited remixed version), it would later become a hit for dance vocalist Lady Violet.

The album failed to chart in the UK. The first single, "Love In Your Eyes", reached No.80 in the UK Singles Chart, (his final chart entry there). The song fared better in continental Europe, in particular in German-speaking countries (it went to Number 28 in Germany itself), and in Italy, where it peaked at No.22 (his second highest-charting single there). The title track was released as a third single in Spain, and Limahl recorded a Spanish-language version of the song entitled "No Lo Pienses Más" (meaning "Don't Think About It Anymore"). "Don't Send For Me" was released in the Netherlands as the final single from the album.

The album has never been released as a standalone CD but the first eight songs were digitally remastered by Disky Records for the 1996 compilation The Best of Limahl. A reduced version of this digital compilation was released in 2002, again on the Disky label, entitled Neverending Story - Best of Limahl, and included seven tracks from the original album. The whole album appeared as part of Warner Music's Original Albums Series in 2014 along with Limahl's first album, Don't Suppose, and the three Kajagoogoo albums in a budget priced CD boxed set.

== Critical reception ==
Professional ratings
Review scores
| Source | Rating |
|---|---|
| Smash Hits | 0/10 |

Smash Hits magazine gave the album a highly negative review, awarded it a rare zero out of ten and stating that "This album is all that is dull, completely without imagination, and sickeningly bland in the world of popular music..."

== Track listing ==
Colour All My Days – Side one
| No. | Title | Writer(s) | Length |
|---|---|---|---|
| 1. | "Love in Your Eyes" | Limahl | 4:17 |
| 2. | "Colour All My Days" | Limahl | 4:46 |
| 3. | "Nothing on Earth (Can Keep Me from You)" | Limahl; Billy Griffin | 3:47 |
| 4. | "Tonight Will Be the Night" | Limahl | 4:10 |
| 5. | "Working Out" | Limahl | 4:16 |
| Total length: | | | 21:16 |

Colour All My Days – Side two
| No. | Title | Writer(s) | Length |
|---|---|---|---|
| 1. | "Don't Send for Me" | Limahl | 3:36 |
| 2. | "Shock" | Limahl | 4:27 |
| 3. | "Inside to Outside" | Achim Oppermann; Colin Pearson | 3:23 |
| 4. | "Love Will Tear the Soul" | Limahl | 3:39 |
| 5. | "For My Heart's Sake" | Limahl | 3:41 |
| Total length: | | | 18:46 |

== Personnel ==
Credits adapted from the album's liner notes.

Musicians

- Limahl – lead vocals, backing vocals (1–3, 5–10), additional keyboards (3, 4)
- Giorgio Moroder – keyboards (1, 2, 5–10), backing vocals (1, 2, 5–10)
- Laszlo Szucas – keyboards (1, 2, 5–10), programming (1, 2, 5–10)
- Derek Nakamoto – keyboards (3, 4), programming (3, 4)
- Charly Hörnemann – guitars (1, 2, 5–10)
- Donald Griffin – guitars (3)
- Freddie Santiago – percussion (3)
- Dino Solera – saxophone (1, 2, 5–10)
- Tony Buchanan – saxophone (3)
- Judy Cheeks – backing vocals (1, 2, 5–10)
- Victoria Miles – backing vocals (1, 2, 5–10)
- Venetta Fields – backing vocals (3)
- Billy Griffin – backing vocals (3)
- Michael Hamm – backing vocals (3)
- Sherlie Matthews – backing vocals (3)

Production and design

- Giorgio Moroder – producer (1, 2, 5–10)
- Limahl – producer (3, 4), remixing (3, 4)
- Derek Nakamoto – producer (3, 4)
- Hans Menzel – engineer (1, 2, 5–10), mix down (1, 2, 5–10)
- Brian Reeves – engineer (1, 2, 5–10), remixing (1, 2, 6–10)
- Zeke Lund – engineer (3, 4)
- Jürgen Koppers – mixing (3, 4)
- Harry Schnitzler – remixing (3, 4)
- Johnny Rozsa – photography
- Bill Smith Studio – cover design
- Michael John – hair stylist
- Gaff Management – management

== Charts ==
Weekly chart performance for Colour All My Days
| Chart (1986) | Peak position |
|---|---|
| German Albums (Offizielle Top 100) | 45 |
