= Only for Love =

Single by Limahl

from the album Don't Suppose
- B-side: "O.T.T. (Over the Top)"
- Released: October 1983
- Recorded: 1983
- Genre: Pop
- Length: 3:55
- Label: EMI
- Songwriter: Limahl
- Producers: Dave Harris; Tim Palmer

Limahl singles chronology
| "Only for Love" (1983) | "Too Much Trouble" (1984) |

"Only for Love" is the debut solo single by former Kajagoogoo singer Limahl, following being fired from the group by his bandmates in 1983. The song was included on Limahl's 1984 debut solo album, Don't Suppose. The song became his first UK top 20 hit, peaking at No. 16 on the UK singles chart. It remains his second most popular single in the UK as a solo act (the first being "The NeverEnding Story").

Limahl performed the song with Beth Anderson on the TV show American Bandstand on March 9, 1985.

The song also played a part in the singer meeting producer Giorgio Moroder, while he was performing the song at a rock festival in Tokyo the following year. Moroder would help Limahl reach greater international success later in his career.

== Personnel ==
- Limahl - vocals, keyboards

== Charts ==
| Chart (1984–1985) | Peak position |
|---|---|
| Australia (Kent Music Report) | 50 |
| Austria (Ö3 Austria Top 40) | 9 |
| Switzerland (Swiss Hitparade) | 5 |
| UK Singles Chart | 16 |
| US Billboard Hot 100 | 51 |
| West Germany (Media Control) | 8 |
