= Love in Your Eyes =

1994 single by Limahl

Single by Limahl

from the album Colour All My Days
- B-side: "Love Will Tear the Soul"
- Released: 21 April 1986
- Genre: Synth-pop
- Length: 4:07
- Label: EMI
- Songwriter(s): Limahl
- Producer(s): Giorgio Moroder

Limahl singles chronology
"The NeverEnding Story" (1984)	"Love in Your Eyes" (1986)	"Inside to Outside" (1986)

"Love in Your Eyes" is a song by English singer-songwriter Limahl from his second studio album, Colour All My Days (1986).

== Track listing and formats ==
- UK 7-inch single

A. "Love in Your Eyes" – 4:07
B. "Love Will Tear the Soul" – 3:47

== Credits and personnel ==
- Limahl – songwriter, vocals
- Giorgio Moroder – producer
- Hans Menzel – engineering, mixing
- Brian Reeves – engineering, remixer
- Johnny Rozsa – cover art, photographer

Credits and personnel adapted from the Colour All My Days album and 7-inch single liner notes.

== Charts ==
Weekly chart performance for "Love in Your Eyes"
Chart (1986)	Peak position
Belgium (Ultratop 50 Flanders)	26
Italy (Musica e dischi)	21
Switzerland (Schweizer Hitparade)	26
UK Singles (OCC)	80
West Germany (GfK)	28
