= Stephanie Nguyen =

Stephanie Nguyen may refer to:

- Stephanie Nguyen (dancer) (born 1986), Danish dancer
- Stephanie Nguyen (politician), member of the California State Assembly
