= Too Much Trouble (song) =

1984 single by Limahl

Single by Limahl

from the album Don't Suppose
- B-side: "You've Been Gone for a Little While"
- Released: 21 May 1984
- Genre: Synth-pop
- Label: EMI
- Songwriter(s): Limahl
- Producer(s): Tim Palmer; Dave Harris

Limahl singles chronology
| "Only for Love" (1983) | "Too Much Trouble" (1984) | "The NeverEnding Story" (1984) |

"Too Much Trouble" is a song by English singer-songwriter Limahl from his debut studio album, Don't Suppose (1984).

== Credits and personnel ==
- Limahl – songwriter, vocals
- Tim Palmer – producer, engineering
- Dave Harris – producer
- Brian Aris – cover art, photographer

Credits and personnel adapted from the Don't Suppose album and 7-inch single liner notes.

== Charts ==
Weekly chart performance for "Too Much Trouble"
| Chart (1984) | Peak position |
|---|---|
| Finland (Suomen virallinen lista) | 23 |
| UK Singles (OCC) | 64 |
| West Germany (GfK) | 26 |
