= Love Is Blind (Limahl album) =

Studio album by Limahl
- Released: 16 June 1992 (re-released in 1998)
- Recorded: May 1991–March 1992
- Genres: Pop, dance
- Length: 42:01 (Germany); 50:53 (Japan)
- Labels: Bellaphon (Germany); Jimco (Japan)
- Producer: Limahl et al.

Limahl chronology
Colour All My Days (1986)	Love Is Blind (1992)

Love Is Blind is the third solo album by the English singer Limahl, released in 1992 (on Bellaphon Records in Germany, and on Jimco Records in Japan, the only two countries where the record was ever marketed). The work was also released in other two German-speaking countries of central Europe, namely Austria and Switzerland.

== Music ==
The album mainly contains pop and dance-oriented tunes, and it is entirely produced by Limahl himself, with the help of a number of co-producers, including English orchestra composer and pop musician Anne Dudley, and writer/producer Graham Stack, who has written and produced hit records for many artists including Kylie Minogue, Tina Turner, Take That, Rod Stewart and Steps, though Limahl's own record wasn't particularly successful at the time. In fact, none of the singles or the album itself ever entered the charts in any of the few countries of release.

== Editions ==
The 12-track Japanese edition also includes two bonus tracks, which are not featured on the 10-track German edition, these being "Stop (Long Dub Version)" and "Maybe This Time (Dub Version)", the original versions of which were both taken as singles to promote the album. Strangely enough, both of these singles were released under the semi-fictitious pseudonym "Bassline featuring Limahl", behind which lies the artist himself, appearing as "LUC", standing for "Limahl Under Cover".

== Singles ==
The album produced two more singles; the title track "Love Is Blind", and a new re-recorded version of "Too Shy", which, back in 1983, was originally a UK number one for Kajagoogoo, the band of which Limahl was the lead singer in 1982–1983, in 2003–2004 for VH1's Bands Reunited series, and finally once again from 2008–2011. With them, Limahl recorded a new studio album and, at the same time, toured Europe.

== Release ==
In Germany alone, where either Kajagoogoo and Limahl's popularity, though a 25-year-long separation as a five-piece band, and almost as long an inactivity in general, was always maintained, Limahl's third solo work was first released in October 1992, and re-released in 1998. Unlike his first two long playing works, 1984 Don't Suppose and 1986 Colour All My Days, only out as vinyl LPs and as MCs, and never so far digitally re-released in their entirety, Limahl's third album was released exclusively as a CD, without being marketed anyway neither in the UK nor in any other countries outside Japan and central Europe, though fans' requests.

== Track listing ==
1. "Love Is Blind" (Limahl) – 3:51
2. "So Far So Good" (Limahl, Eric V. Tijn, Jochem Fluitsma) – 3:58
3. "Stop" (Limahl, Steve Pigott) – 4:00
4. "Too Shy '92" (Limahl, Nick Beggs, Jez Strode, Steve Askew, Stuart Croxford Neale) – 4:03
5. "Let's Get Together Again" (Limahl, Anne Dudley) – 4:10
6. "Life Must Go On" (Limahl, Shaun Imrei, Graham Stack) – 4:18
7. "Maybe This Time" (Limahl, Steve Pigott) – 4:24
8. "Cheatin" (Limahl, Colin Taffe) – 3:45
9. "Stay with Me" (Limahl, Peter Oxendale) – 5:06
10. "Someone Else" (Limahl) – 4:26
11. "Stop" (Long Dub Version) (Limahl, Steve Piggott) – 4:53 [bonus track in Japan only]
12. "Maybe This Time" (Dub Version) (Limahl, Steve Piggott) – 3:58 [bonus track in Japan only]

== Singles released ==
- 1992 – "Stop (7" Version)"/"Stop (Instrumental)" [released as "Bassline featuring Limahl"]
- 1992 – "Maybe This Time (7" Mix)"/"Maybe This Time (a cappella Version)" [released as "Bassline featuring Limahl"]
- 1992 – "Too Shy '92 (Radio edit)"/"Too Shy '92 (a cappella Version)"
- 1992 – "Love Is Blind (Album Version)"/"Love Is Blind (a cappella Version)"

== Personnel ==
- Limahl – lead singer, production
- Eric V. Tijn, Jochem Fluitsma – co-production #3
- Steve Pigott – co-production #4, #7, #11, #12
- Andy Reynolds – co-production #4, #11
- Anne Dudley – co-production No. 5
- Shaun Imrei, Graham Stack – co-production No. 6
- Colin Taffe – co-production #8
- Peter Oxendale – co-production #9
- Brian Aris – cover photography

== Release details ==
Country	Date	Label	Format	Catalogue
Germany	1992	Bellaphon	CD	290-07-181
Japan		Jimco		JICM-89152
