= Help! I'm a Fish =

2000 Danish animated film

- Danish theatrical release poster
- Danish: Hjælp, jeg er en fisk
- Directed by: Stefan Fjeldmark; Michael Hegner; Greg Manwaring (uncredited)
- Written by: Stefan Fjeldmark; Karsten Kiilerich; John Stefan Olsen; Tracy J. Brown
- Story by: Stefan Fjeldmark; Karsten Kiilerich
- Produced by: Anders Mastrup; Eberhard Junkersdorf; Russell Boland
- Starring: Jeff Pace; Michelle Westerson; Aaron Paul; Terry Jones; Alan Rickman; David Bateson
- Edited by: Per Risager
- Music by: Søren Hyldgaard
- Production companies: A. Film APS; Egmont Imagination; Munich Animation GmbH; Kinowelt Medien AG; EIV Entertainment Filmproduktion; TerraGlyph Rights Limited; TV2 Denmark; Eurimages
- Distributed by: Nordisk Film (Denmark); Kinowelt (Germany); HanWay Films and PID (Internationally)
- Release dates: 6 October 2000 (Denmark); 12 April 2001 (Germany); 24 August 2001 (Ireland)
- Running time: 77 minutes
- Countries: Denmark; Germany; Ireland
- Language: Danish
- Budget: 101 million DKK ($18 million USD)
- Box office: $5.6 million

Help! I'm a Fish (Danish: Hjælp, jeg er en fisk; also known as A Fish Tale) is a 2000 Danish animated musical science fantasy comedy film directed by Stefan Fjeldmark, Greg Manwaring, and Michael Hegner, and written by Fjeldmark, Karsten Kiilerich, John Stefan Olsen, and Tracy J. Brown. It stars the voices of Alan Rickman, Terry Jones, and a then-unknown Aaron Paul. The film tells the story of three kids–Fly, his little sister Stella, and cousin Chuck–who turn into sea creatures and must return to human form before 48 hours are up; otherwise, they will be stuck as fish forever. They must also contend with a pilot fish who has taken the antidote for himself, which he has his own plans for.

It was released on 6 October 2000 in Denmark, 10 August 2001 in the United Kingdom, and 5 September 2006 in the United States. Animation production was split between A. Film Production in Denmark, Munich Animation in Germany, and Terraglyph Interactive Studios in Dublin, Ireland. The film was a commercial failure and box-office flop, grossing $5.6 million in Denmark against an approximate $18 million budget, but received positive reviews from critics and audiences.

== Plot ==
Fly is an impulsive 12-year-old boy living with his younger sister Stella and parents Lisa and Bill. When their parents go out for the night, Fly and Stella are babysat by their aunt Anna and her son Chuck, a cautious, overweight genetics prodigy, and Fly and Stella's cousin. When Anna falls asleep, the children sneak out to go fishing. Caught in a high tide, they stumble across the boathouse of Professor MacKrill, an eccentric but kindly marine biologist. Reasoning that climate change will melt the polar icecaps to produce marine transgression within the next century, MacKrill reveals he has developed a potion to transform humans into fish, along with an antidote that will reverse the conflict.

Mistaking it for lemonade, Stella drinks the potion and turns into a starfish, which Fly unknowingly throws out the window into the sea. Chuck discovers the mistake after finding Stella's transformation caught on camera. The trio set out to find Stella, but their boat sinks in a storm. Fly and Chuck drink the potion, turning into a California flying fish and a moon jellyfish. Bill and Lisa return home to find Anna frantic with worry. Noticing that Fly's fishing equipment is gone, Bill, Lisa, and Anna head to the beach to search for them but find only Fly's rollerblades. The adults fear the worst until Professor MacKrill, having survived the storm, arrives and shows them a video of Stella's transformation.

Underwater, the leaking antidote attracts a lemon shark and a pilot fish. They consume it, gaining intelligence and anthropomorphic appearances. The pilot fish names himself Joe and uses the antidote to create a civilisation of intelligent fish, intending to launch a revolution against humanity, whilst The Shark becomes his dim-witted subordinate.

Fly, Chuck, and Stella reunite, accompanied by Sasha, a seahorse whom Stella adopts. They must find the antidote within forty-eight hours, or their transformations will be permanent. The trio swims to Joe's domain, a sunken oil tanker, where Fly tries to steal the antidote. They are caught and interrogated by Joe about their intent and origins. He demands that they manufacture more of the antidote, or the Shark will eat them. The children are imprisoned and guarded by an aggressive, militaristic king crab. Sasha frees the children, who manage to escape.

The children decide their only hope to become human again is to duplicate the antidote's formula, gathering ingredients from around the ocean. Just as they complete the potion, Joe and his army appear and corner them. In a stand-off, Joe drinks the last of the original antidote, transforming his fins into hands. The children try to escape, but Fly is wounded by the crab, who drinks the new antidote and declares himself King Crab. At the same time, MacKrill and Bill pass over in a makeshift boat powered by a water pump. The pump causes an underwater typhoon, sucking up the army. The Shark eats the King Crab but is incapacitated when he is sucked head-first into the pump.

Chuck remembers that MacKrill has another vial of the antidote in his laboratory. Formulating a plan, Chuck plans to carry Fly and Stella through dangerous seawater intake pipes back to the lab. However, Stella has to leave Sasha behind as the journey could kill her. The children flood MacKrill's laboratory to reach the potion, but Joe follows, stealing it. Fly pursues Joe into the pipes, tricking him into repeatedly drinking from the potion by challenging his intellect, causing Joe to transform into a human and drown.

Fly drags the antidote back into the lab, Chuck uncorks it just as Lisa and Anna open the door to the flooded lab. Chuck and Stella become human once more, reuniting with their parents and MacKrill. After a few tense moments in which a stuffed fish is mistaken for Fly's body, a human Fly emerges from one of the lab's pipes with a broken leg. Later, the family and MacKrill spend some time together on the beach. Stella reunites with Sasha, so Chuck and MacKrill turn her into a horse, which Stella rides her around joyfully.

== Cast ==
Character	Danish voice actor	English voice actor
Fly	Sebastian Jessen	Jeff Pace; Morgan Fane (additional dialogue)
Stella	Pil Neja	Michelle Westerson; Alexandra Jakobsen (additional dialogue)
Chuck	Morten Kernn Nielsen	Aaron Paul; Alessandro Juliani (additional dialogue)
Joe	Nis Bank-Mikkelsen	Alan Rickman
Professor H. O. MacKrill	Søren Sætter-Lassen	Terry Jones
Shark	Dick Kaysø	David Bateson
Sasha	Louise Fribo	Louise Fribo
General Crab	Ulf Pilgaard	David Bateson
Bill	Peter Gantzler	John Payne
Lisa	Paprika Steen	Teryl Rothery
Aunt Anna	Ghita Nørby	Pauline Newstone
Shrimp	Dick Kaysø	Ian James Corlett
Eel	Ghita Nørby	Tabitha St. Germain
Flounder	Martin Brygmann	Garry Chalk
Bus Driver	Zlatko Burić	Richard Newman
Seabass	Michael Hegner	Scott McNeil

== Production and music ==
In 1992, A. Film produced an early trailer for a film titled Swifty, Twinky and Ploop with support from the Danish Film Institute. It was written and directed by Stefan Fjeldmark and Karsten Kiilerich, and followed three marine creatures on a journey to find an unpolluted environment. In 1996, a pilot trailer was completed, which resurfaced on the Internet in 2014. The environment and object designs, animation, plot, character names, voices, and designs are noticeably different from how they would eventually appear in the finished film.

Development and storyboarding of the film were completed in Denmark. Production then moved to Germany and Ireland for the final phases of animation, lighting, colour, and production to maximise tax credits offered to foreign film projects in Germany and Ireland. The production took about four years to complete, with the work split and frequently moved around. The English and Danish versions were produced simultaneously, with the former having more involvement; the film was initially written, recorded, and animated in English before being translated into Danish by Gunhild Wernblad.

The film's score was composed by Søren Hyldgaard. The soundtrack contains numerous popular and original songs, such as "Help! I'm a Fish (Little Yellow Fish)" performed by Little Trees (which serves as the film's main theme), "Agloubablou" performed by Cartoons, "Ocean of Emotion" performed by Meja, "People Lovin Me" performed by Lou Bega, "Close Your Eyes" performed by Patricia Kaas, "Interlude" and "Fishtastic" performed by Terry Jones, and "Intelligence" performed by Alan Rickman. One original song, "Ocean Love/Ton Amour Ocean", which serves as the film's opening theme, is performed by either Anggun or Eddi Reader, depending on the release.

== Release ==
The film was released theatrically on 6 October 2000 by Nordisk Film and on DVD and VHS on 6 January 2003 by Movie Star.

HanWay Films and PID (Producers International Distribution) handled international sales for the film.

The film had a theatrical release in the United States on 29 June 2001, and in the United Kingdom by Metrodome Distribution on 10 August 2001. In Ireland, the movie was screened on 27 June 2003 as part of the athletes' evening entertainment programme for the Special Olympics World Games.

In North America, the English dub of the film was released in 2006 in the USA by Genius Products and in 2007 in Canada by Alliance Atlantis.

== Reception ==
=== Box office ===
Help! I'm a Fish, according to distributor Nordisk, was a moderate success in Denmark during the school holiday week, when the film's box office increased by 240% from the first to the second week. In the second week, it grossed $915,945. In comparison, Lars von Trier's Dancer in the Dark has grossed $885,020 after six weeks. It became the most-watched Danish cinema film of the year, with 335,000 tickets sold during the last 13 weeks of 2000 in 3 ½ weeks alone. The film grossed $5.6 million in Denmark against an approximate $18 million budget and became a box-office bomb.

The film was deemed more successful at the box office in Germany, France, and Finland, where audiences are even more suspicious of non-US animations.

The UK release of the film opened to a mediocre £81,908 in 157 cinemas.

=== Critical response ===
Help! I'm a Fish received positive reviews.

Renee Schonfeld from Common Sense Media calls the movie an "entertaining, nicely animated story, with engaging heroes, cleverly designed musical sequences, and exciting action." She also praised voice actor Alan Rickman as a "funny, slitheringly evil performance made well […] tops a solid cast" and the animation as "old-fashioned and combines simply-drawn characters with beautiful underwater settings." She gives it a three stars out of five rating. Peter Bradshaw of The Guardian calls it a "sweet, charming and entertaining little cartoon." He also noted that Rickman's "superbly wicked character isn't on, but it's a nice little holiday film nonetheless." Lisa Nesselson of Variety Magazine reviewed that "classy, impressionistic animation of underwater inhabitants […] the drawing style switches to a more standard cartoon look." She also noted that they prefer the "bloated, charmless overkill of a live-action 'Grinch' to the beautifully rendered and emotionally spot-on 'The Iron Giant,' 'Fish' comes as salutary entertainment for all but the very youngest viewers," and the "script is genuinely down to the wire as the trio matches wits with evil Joe. Musical numbers are adequately catchy." Olly Richards of Empire gave the film two stars out of five, stating that "Despite a flourish or two in the design, this really doesn't bring a lot to the table, given the current level of competition in the animated film stakes." Time Out said it "lacks that extra dimension which would engage and entertain the adults in the audience as well as the kids." Evening Standard said "The animation is light years behind Disney or DreamWorks, but achieves a sort of nostalgic charm because of it […]."

== Awards and nominations ==
Help! I'm a Fish won a Children's Jury Award for Feature Film or Video – Animation in the 2000 Chicago International Children's Film Festival.

Award	Date of ceremony	Category	Recipient(s)	Result
Chicago International Children's Film Festival	2000	Feature Film or Video - Animation	Stefan Fjeldmark and Michael Hegner	Won
Robert Awards	4 February 2001			
Robert Awards	4 February 2001	Best Danish Film	Help! I'm a Fish	Nominated
Robert Awards	4 February 2001	Best Director	Stefan Fjeldmark and Michael Hegner	Nominated
Robert Awards	4 February 2001	Best Screenplay	Stefan Fjeldmark and Karsten Kiilerich	Nominated
Robert Awards	4 February 2001	Best Score	Søren Hyldgaard	Nominated
Robert Awards	4 February 2001	Best Sound	Stig Sparre-Ulrich and Friedrich M. Dosch	Nominated
Robert Awards	4 February 2001	Special Effects	Jesper Colding and Nicolai Tuma	Nominated
Annecy International Animation Film Festival	9 June 2001	Best Feature Film	Help! I'm a Fish	Nominated
German Film Award	14 June 2002	Outstanding Children or Youth Film	Help! I'm a Fish	Nominated

== Soundtrack ==
Help! I'm a Fish

Soundtrack album by Various Artists
- Released: 28 February 2003
- Recorded: 2000
- Genre: Movie soundtrack
- Labels: Medley Records; Trust Soundtracks; EMI
- Producer: Various Artists

Søren Hyldgaard film scores chronology
Edderkoppen (2000)	Help! I'm a Fish (2003)	Pixie Panic (2000)

Singles from Help! I'm a Fish
- 1. "Help! I'm a Fish (Little Yellow Fish)" Released: March 26, 2001

Danish teen-pop girl group Little Trees performed the title track, "Help! I'm a Fish (Little Yellow Fish)", which was released as a single in the UK. Fellow Danish girl group Creamy also recorded a version of the song. The Belgian girl group K3 also recorded a Dutch version of the song for the movie.

1. Help! I'm a Fish (Little Yellow Fish) – Little Trees
2. Do You Believe in Magic? – Loona
3. Wobble-Di-Bubble-Di-Doo – Cartoons
4. People Lovin' Me – Lou Bega
5. Funky Sharks – Shaka feat. Sko
6. Mother Nature – Little Trees
7. Interlude (Professor) – Terry Jones
8. Fishtastic – Terry Jones
9. Ocean Love – Eddi Reader
10. Close Your Eyes – Patricia Kaas
11. Interlude (Jelly Fish) – Jeff Pace & Alessandro Juliani
12. Suddenly – Solveig
13. Ocean Of Emotion – Meja
14. Intelligence – Alan Rickman
15. Interlude (Goodbye) – Michelle Westerson
16. Barracuda – Zindy featuring Pablo

== Legacy ==
A television series adaption was announced by Egmont Imagination in May 2001, and would consist of twenty-six episodes. Further development has not been stated to take place, and the series was never made.

The film's stars Aaron Paul and Alan Rickman would later co-star again in the 2015 film Eye in the Sky, released shortly after Rickman's death. Paul expressed his regret that despite working with Rickman on Help! I'm a Fish and Eye in the Sky, they never got the chance to meet.
