= Help! I'm a Fish (song) =

2001 single by Little Trees

Single by Little Trees

from the album Help! I'm a Fish
- Released: 20 August 2001 (UK); 26 March 2001 (Germany)
- Genre: Teen pop, eurodance, dance-pop
- Length: 3:30
- Label: BMG
- Producer: Ole Evenrud

"Help! I'm a Fish" is a song first released by Danish pop duo Creamy in 2000 for their second album, We Got the Time. The following year, Danish girl group Little Trees released their version which was included in the Danish film Help! I'm a Fish. Both versions were produced by Ole Evenrud. It was certified triple platinum in Scandinavia.

== Composition ==
The song is in the key of E major at 130 beats per minute.

== Track listing ==
Standard Edition and Cassette Edition
No.	Title	Length
1.	"Help, I'm a Fish" (Radio Edit)	3:11
2.	"Help, I'm a Fish" (Album Version)	3:29
3.	"Help, I'm a Fish" (Karaoke Version)	3:29
Total length:		10:09

CD-Maxi-Single Edition
No.	Title	Length
1.	"Help, I'm a Fish" (English Version - Album Version)	3:29
2.	"Help, I'm a Fish" (English Version - Radio Edit)	3:11
3.	"Ich bin ein kleiner, gelber Fisch" (German Version)	3:29
4.	"Help, I'm a Fish" (Instrumental Version)	3:42
Total length:		13:51

iTunes Edition
No.	Title	Length
1.	"Help, I'm a Fish" (I'm a Little Yellow Fish)	3:15
2.	"Gloups, je suis un poisson" (French Version)	3:15
3.	"Ich bin ein kleiner, gelber Fisch" (German Version)	3:32
4.	"Help, I'm a Fish" (Instrumental Version)	3:43
Total length:		13:43

== Charts ==
Chart (2001)	Peak position
Denmark (IFPI Denmark)	3
Europe (Eurochart Hot 100)	48
Ireland (IRMA)	30
Scottish Singles Sales (Official Charts)	6
UK Singles (Official Charts)	11

== Other versions ==
- Flemish girl group K3 recorded a Dutch version of the song for the Dutch release of the film. It was included on their 2001 album Tele-Romeo titled "Blub, ik ben een vis".
