= Lady Violet =

- Born: Francesca Messina; 10 September 1972 (age 53); Florence, Italy
- Genres: Italodance, Eurohouse
- Occupations: Singer, dancer
- Years active: 1996–2004
- Labels: Edel Records, New Music International

Lady Violet (born Francesca Messina, 10 September 1972, Florence, Italy) is an Italian musician. Francesca's musical career started in the 90's as a singer in the Italian vocal ensemble Jubilee Shouters by which she recorded the album Black & Blue under the Sensible Records (3) label. In the meantime she collaborated with other labels as a vocalist for a few dance projects, such as the New Music International label being both vocalist and frontwoman for the Euro House/Italodance project Lady Violet.

Lady Violet released her first single, "Inside to Outside", with success in Italy, Sweden, Denmark, Belgium, Norway, France, and the United Kingdom. The song is a cover song first published by Limahl in 1986. The second single, "Beautiful World", peaked at No. 19 on the Italian singles chart.

== Discography ==
=== Singles ===
| Single | Year | Peak chart positions | | | | | | | Album |
| Single | Year | ITA | EUR | FRA | BEL^{(Vl)} | BEL^{(Wa)} | NOR | SWE | Album |
|---|---|---|---|---|---|---|---|---|---|
| "Inside To Outside" | 1999 | — | — | — | — | — | — | — | Singles only |
| "Inside To Outside" (reissue) | 2000 | — | 71 | 32 | 22 | 28 | 19 | 11 | Singles only |
| "Beautiful World" | 2000 | 19 | — | 51 | — | — | — | — | Singles only |
| "Calling Your Name / Lovin' You Baby" | 2001 | 21 | — | — | — | — | — | — | Singles only |
| "No Way No Time" | 2001 | 40 | — | — | — | — | — | — | Singles only |
| "In Your Mind" | 2002 | — | — | — | — | — | — | — | Singles only |
