= Little Trees (group) =

Danish teen pop girl group

- Origin: Copenhagen, Denmark
- Genres: Teen pop; bubblegum; eurodance
- Years active: 2001–2002
- Label: BMG
- Past members: Marie Brøbech; Stephanie Nguyen; Sofie Walburn Kring

Little Trees were a short-lived Danish teen pop girl group from Copenhagen. They are best known for their contribution to the soundtrack of the 2001 animated film Help! I'm a Fish, for which they performed the title track, "Help! I'm a Fish (Little Yellow Fish)".

"Help! I'm a Fish (Little Yellow Fish)" was produced by Ole Evenrud, of A*Teens fame. Evenrud also produced a similar-sounding version of the song for the Danish duo, Creamy.

The trio consisted of Marie Brøbech, Stephanie Nguyen and Sofie Walburn Kring, who were 13, 14 and 15 years of age at the time, respectively. The girls had known each other since childhood and had been fixated on singing and dancing from the ages of 8–9. The producers of the original soundtrack for the film Help I'm a Fish approached the girls with the title song, which they performed and toured with in Berlin and London (performing on Top of the Pops). "Help! I'm a Fish" gained triple platinum status in Scandinavia.

== Discography ==
=== Singles ===
Title	Year	UK Singles Chart
"Help! I'm a Fish (Little Yellow Fish)"	2001	11
"Turn Around"	2002	—
