= We Got the Time =

Studio album by Creamy
- Released: 2000
- Genre: Teen pop

Creamy chronology
Creamy (1999)	We Got the Time (2000)	Christmas Snow (2001)

Singles from We Got the Time
- 1. "NeverEnding Story"; 2. "Little Kitty"; 3. "I Do, I Do, I Do"

We Got the Time, is the second studio album by Danish-teen girl pop duo, Creamy, released in 2000. It was first released on CD in 2000, and later for digital download on March 3, 2003. The album was certified 2× platinum for sales of more than 100,000 copies.

== Track listing ==
1. "I do I do I do"
2. "Help! I'm a Fish"
3. "We got the Time"
4. "Little Kitty" (cover of Walkers song)
5. "Fantasy Island"
6. "Never Ending Story"
7. "Little 1"
8. "Bye Bye Bike"
9. "Do you think i'm Pretty?"
10. "Fantasy Spaceship"
11. "It can happen to You"
12. "Ice Cream"

== Chart positions ==
Year	Chart	Peak position
2000	Danish Albums (Hitlisten)	2
2001	Danish Albums (Hitlisten)	21
