= Don't Suppose =

Studio album by Limahl
- Released: 5 November 1984
- Recorded: September 1983 – February 1984
- Studios: Utopia Studios Primrose Hill, London, UK); Ridge Farm Studios (Capel, Surrey, UK); Trident 2 and Abbey Road Studios (London, UK)
- Length: 41:46
- Label: EMI
- Producers: De Harris; Tim Palmer; Giorgio Moroder

Limahl chronology
White Feathers (1983)	Don't Suppose (1984)	Colour All My Days (1986)

Singles from Don't Suppose
- 1. "Only for Love" Released: October 1983; 2. "Too Much Trouble" Released: May 1984; 3. "The NeverEnding Story" Released: September 1984; 4. "Tar Beach" Released: November 1984 (EU)

Professional ratings
Review scores
Source	Rating
Smash Hits	4/10 stars

Don't Suppose (also written as Don't Suppose...) is the debut solo studio album by the English singer Limahl, formerly lead vocalist of the pop band Kajagoogoo, released on 5 November 1984 by EMI Records.

Originally only released on vinyl album and cassette, it was not released on compact disc until 2012 on the Gold Legion label, though several songs from the album had appeared on other albums. The compilation album The Best of Limahl features eight tracks from Don't Suppose, and the compilation Neverending Story: Best of Limahl features five tracks. The song "Tar Beach", which appears on neither of those albums, is featured on two joint compilations with Kajagoogoo. "The Greenhouse Effect" has never been officially released on compact disc. (Later editions of Don't Suppose replaced "The Greenhouse Effect" with "The NeverEnding Story".)

== Title ==
Limahl explained that the title Don't Suppose was an invitation to the listener to personally verify the value of his music without supposing, assuming, or guessing.

== Music ==
With the exception of "The NeverEnding Story", Limahl composed the lyrics and music for the album himself. The original release was produced by De Harris and Tim Palmer; Palmer had previously collaborated with Kajagoogoo. "The NeverEnding Story" featured lyrics by Keith Forsey and was produced by Moroder. In a 1984 Japanese television interview, Limahl said that Don't Suppose saw him experimenting much more than he did on White Feathers, Kajagoogoo's debut album (which included "Too Shy"). Much of the record features a string section; flutes and saxophones also join Limahl's keyboards.

== Singles ==
The song "Only for Love", the first single released from the album, peaked at number 16 on the UK Singles Chart in late 1983. The B-side of the single, "O.T.T. (Over the Top)", was never released on an album; it was a studio version of "Over the Top", an a cappella track sung by Limahl with Nick Beggs during the concert filmed for the VHS and Laserdisc release of Kajagoogoo's White Feathers Tour. The original live version included only the first two verses; the studio version includes a third verse, a middle section, and a final chorus with a brief coda.

"Too Much Trouble" was the second release, though this failed to reach the UK top 40, peaking at number 64. It was more successful in Germany, reaching number 26.

The third single, "The NeverEnding Story", charted in 17 countries, reaching the top five in several and number one in Spain, Sweden and Norway. In Italy and Germany, the song reached the number two position. In the US the song reached number 17 on the Billboard Hot 100. In France only, "The NeverEnding Story (L'histoire Sans Fin)", a French version of the song also sung by Limahl, was released as the B-side. It featured additional vocals by Ann Calvert.

The fourth single, "Tar Beach" was released with "The Greenhouse Effect" (live) as its B-side. It reached number 30 in Germany.

== Editions ==
The first Japanese vinyl release of the album omitted the hit single "The NeverEnding Story", from the soundtrack to the film The NeverEnding Story, which came at the end of side one; it was replaced with the B-Side from "Tar Beach" titled "The Greenhouse Effect". "The NeverEnding Story" was composed by Tirolean producer Giorgio Moroder; Moroder also composed the instrumental B-side "Ivory Tower", as well as most of the singer's second solo album, Colour All My Days. Limahl came to know Moroder while performing "Only for Love" at a rock festival in Tokyo; Moroder suggested that Limahl sing the movie's title song.

In March 2012, Gold Legion issued the album on CD in the US featuring remixes of "NeverEnding Story" and "Only for Love" as bonus tracks. On track 10 at 3:25, there is a flaw during the transfer—a digital stuttering in one of the instruments. In 2014, Parlophone reissued it in Warner Music's budget box-set Original Album Series along with Colour All My Days and the three Kajagoogoo albums without bonus material.

The first eight tracks were digitised by Dutch budget label Disky Communications for inclusion on the compilation album The Best of Limahl, released in 1996. That album omits the last two tracks of Don't Suppose: "Tar Beach" and "Oh Girl"; also missing is "The Greenhouse Effect", although "The NeverEnding Story" is included. The compilation was re-released in 2003.

In 2002, Disky released an abridged version of the compilation, Neverending Story: Best of Limahl, which included five songs from Don't Suppose.

== Commercial performance ==
The album was moderately successful, although it was a commercial failure in the UK, where it peaked at number 63 (much lower than Kajagoogoo's second album, released that same year, which peaked at number 35). In the US it fared better, reaching number 41.

== Track listing ==
All tracks are written by Limahl except where noted.

Don't Suppose track listing
No.	Title	Writer(s)	Length
1.	"Don't Suppose"		4:18
2.	"That Special Something"		4:15
3.	"Your Love"		4:28
4.	"Too Much Trouble"		3:56
5.	"The NeverEnding Story" ("The Greenhouse Effect" replaces this track on the first Japanese vinyl pressing)	music: Giorgio Moroder; lyrics: Keith Forsey	3:29
6.	"Only for Love"		3:55
7.	"I Was a Fool"		4:45
8.	"The Waiting Game"		4:03
9.	"Tar Beach"		3:47
10.	"Oh Girl"		4:39

== Personnel ==
- Limahl – lead vocals, backing vocals (1–3, 6, 7, 9), keyboards (1–4, 6–10)
- Dave "De" Harris – keyboards (1–4, 6–10), Fairlight CMI (1–4, 6–10), guitars (1–4, 6–10), Fairlight programming (1–4, 6–10)
- B. J. Cole – pedal steel guitar (9)
- Tim Palmer – Simmons percussion (1, 3, 6–8), additional Simmons percussion (2, 4), percussion (10)
- Martin Ditcham – percussion (2, 4, 9), additional percussion (8)
- Gary Barnacle – flute (6)
- Andy Mackintosh – saxophone (7), flute (7, 9)
- Anne Dudley – string arrangements and conductor (3, 7, 8, 10)
- Dynamite – female backing vocals (1, 2, 4, 8)

Production

- Dave "De" Harris – producer (1–4, 6–10), liner notes
- Tim Palmer – producer (1–4, 6–10), engineer, liner notes
- Giorgio Moroder – producer (5)
- Pierre – assistant engineer
- Sven Taits – assistant engineer
- Mike Jarratt – additional engineer
- Chris Sheldon – additional engineer
- Brian Aris – photography
- T&CP Associates – cover design
- Sue Mann – make-up
- Michael John – hair
- Limahl – liner notes
- Gaff Management – management

== Charts ==
Chart performance for Don't Suppose
Chart (1984–1985)	Peak position
Austrian Albums (Ö3 Austria)	10
Canada Top Albums/CDs (RPM)	72
German Albums (Offizielle Top 100)	6
Norwegian Albums (VG-lista)	1
Swedish Albums (Sverigetopplistan)	6
Swiss Albums (Schweizer Hitparade)	6
UK Albums (Official Charts)	63
US Billboard 200	41

Chart (2024)	Peak position
Hungarian Physical Albums (MAHASZ)	16

== Release history ==
Release history for Don't Suppose
Country	Year	Label	Format
United Kingdom	1984	EMI	LP; MC
