= Beth Andersen =

American singer and voice actress (born 1954)

- Born: 1954 (age 71–72); U.S.
- Genres: Pop
- Occupations: Singer; voice actress
- Instrument: Vocals
- Years active: 1983–present
- Label: Casablanca

Beth Andersen (born 1954) is an American singer and voice actress from Lexington, Kentucky.

Andersen's first notable release was the song "Dance Dance Dance" which appeared in the 1983 film Scarface as well as on its soundtrack. "Dance Dance Dance" became iconic in the following years due to its use in the scene where Octavio the Clown is gunned down. The song also appeared on the US 7" version of Debbie Harry's single "Rush Rush", another song from the Scarface soundtrack. "Dance Dance Dance" was also featured in the 2006 video game Scarface: The World Is Yours.

Andersen performed background vocals for Limahl's No. 1 (in Norway, Spain and Sweden) hit "The NeverEnding Story", the theme song for the 1984 eponymous film, though she was not credited as a featured artist. Her lyrics were recorded in America separately from Limahl's and accordingly she did not appear in the music video. One of Limahl's back-up singers, Mandy Newton, lip-synched Andersen's lyrics for the music video. Limahl and Andersen only performed the song together on a few occasions, including on the TV series Solid Gold and American Bandstand.

Andersen also performed the songs "Just Imagine (Way Beyond Fear)" for the 1984 film Thief of Hearts and "Angel Baby" for the 1989 film She's Out of Control. She has also worked as a voice actress. She has voiced characters in the animated feature films The Brave Little Toaster, The Swan Princess, Daisy-Head Mayzie, Babes in Toyland, An All Dogs Christmas Carol and the Disney's 1999 animated feature film Tarzan.

== Filmography ==
=== Film ===
| Year | Title | Role | Notes |
|---|---|---|---|
| 1984 | The NeverEnding Story | The 2nd Balladeer | Voice; Uncredited |
| 1984 | Limahl: The NeverEnding Story | The 2nd Balladeer | Music video Voice |
| 1984 | Limahl: The NeverEnding Story (Version 2) | Herself | Music video |
| 1987 | The Brave Little Toaster | Chorus | Voice |
| 1989 | Little Nemo: Adventures in Slumberland | Singer | Voice; Uncredited |
| 1994 | The Swan Princess | Chorus | Voice; Credited as Beth Andersen |
| 1995 | Daisy-Head Mayzie | Background Singer | Voice; Credited as Beth Andersen |
| 1998 | An All Dogs Christmas Carol | Martha; Additional voices | Direct-to-video; Voice |
| 1998 | The Secret of NIMH 2: Timmy to the Rescue | Chorus | Direct-to-video; Voice; Uncredited |
| 1999 | Tarzan | Additional voices | Voice |
| 2000 | The Best of Dr. Seuss | Background Singer | Direct-to-video; Voice |

=== Television ===
| Year | Title | Role | Notes |
|---|---|---|---|
| 1991 | Back to the Future | —N/a | 1 episode Voice; Credited as Beth Andersen |
