= Stephanie Nguyen (dancer) =

Danish dancer, singer and actress (born 1986)

Stephanie Nguyen (born 31 December 1986) is a Danish dancer, singer and actress. Her father is Vietnamese and her mother is Danish. She was member of the short-lived girl trio Little Trees from 2001 to 2002. In 2007, she won the largest street dance competition, Juste Debout, in France. In 2012, she was selected as a dancer for Madonna's The MDNA Tour.

== Filmography ==
- StreetDance 3D, 2010
- StreetDance: The Moves, 2010
- Beat the World, 2011
- StreetDance 2, 2012
