= Ole Evenrud =

Norwegian musician and producer (born 1962)

Ole Evenrud (born November 17, 1962) is a Norwegian pop artist and teenpop producer. He had his big time in the 1980s under the name Ole i'dole. After the 1980s he has operated as a musical producer, with successes including the 1990 debut by Gothenburg sleaze rockers Swedish Erotica and the 1991 album Iza by future Bond actress Izabella Scorupco for the Virgin Records label.

He was Head of A&R at Polygram Norway from 1993 until 1998, then became a full-time producer, while being the Head of Universal A&R until 2000. Since, Ole has had success with producing many teen-pop acts, such as A*Teens, Creamy and Little Trees.

In 2003 and 2005 he was a judge for the TV2-program Idol.

== Discography ==
=== Albums ===
- 1980 – New Voice of Big Noise
- 1982 – Blond og billig
- 1985 – Popaganda
- 1986 – Idolator
- 1987 – This Ole Town
- 1989 – One Size Fits All
- 2005 – Høy og mørk
- 2006 – One Size Fits All (remastered) (includes bonus tracks)

=== Singles ===
- 1982 – Det vakke min skyld
- 1984 – Sayonara
- 1985 – Ayatollah
- 1986 – X-Ray Specs
- 1987 – This town ain't big enough for the both of us
- 1990 – I natt er verden vår
