= Creamy =

Danish girl group

- Origin: Denmark
- Genres: Pop, Eurodance
- Years active: 1999–2002
- Labels: RecArt Music Denmark; EMI Music Denmark
- Past members: Rebekka Mathew; Rannva Joensen

Creamy were a Danish-Faroese teen-pop duo, composed of Rebekka Mathew and Rannva Joensen.

Their 1999 debut album, Creamy, was recorded when the pair were just thirteen years of age, and composed of euro-pop versions of children's songs. In 2001, they released a seasonal album, Christmas Snow. Their only single in the UK was a euro-pop cover of the theme song to the 1984 film Neverending Story, which was featured on their second album, We Got the Time. They were signed to RecArt Music Denmark.

The album We Got the Time was produced by Ole Evenrud of A*Teens fame. Evenrud also produced a version of "Help! I'm a Fish", a song from the album, for the Danish pop group Little Trees.

After their appearance on Dancemania Speed 10 with a speedy remix of their song "I Do I Do I Do" in late 2002, Creamy appeared on the eurodance compilation series Dancemania several times.

== Discography ==
=== Studio albums and EP's ===
Title	Year	Peak chart positions
Title	Year	DEN
Creamy	1999	1
We Got the Time	2000	2
Creamy & Bassi (EP)	2000	"—"
Christmas Snow	2001	27
"—" indicates the album was not released or failed to chart in that country.

=== Singles ===
Title	Year	Peak chart positions				
Title	Year	DEN	NLD	NLD 40	SWE	UK
"Krabbesangen"	1999	—	—	—	—	—
"Den Bedste Jul I 2000 År"	1999	1	—	—	—	—
"I Do, I Do, I Do"	2000	—	19	37	36	—
"Help! I'm a Fish"	2000	3	—	—	—	11
"Little Kitty" (Netherlands)	2000	—	—	—	—	—
"Neverending Story"	2001	—	—	—	—	—
"See the Snowflakes Falling Down"	2001	—	—	—	—	—
"—" indicates the song was not released or failed to chart in that country.

== In popular media ==
"I Do, I Do, I Do" is a playable song in Dance Dance Revolution Extreme in Normal, Beginner and Nonstop modes. In Nonstop, it is the final of four songs in the Pop4 course.
