= Limahl =

English singer (born 1958)

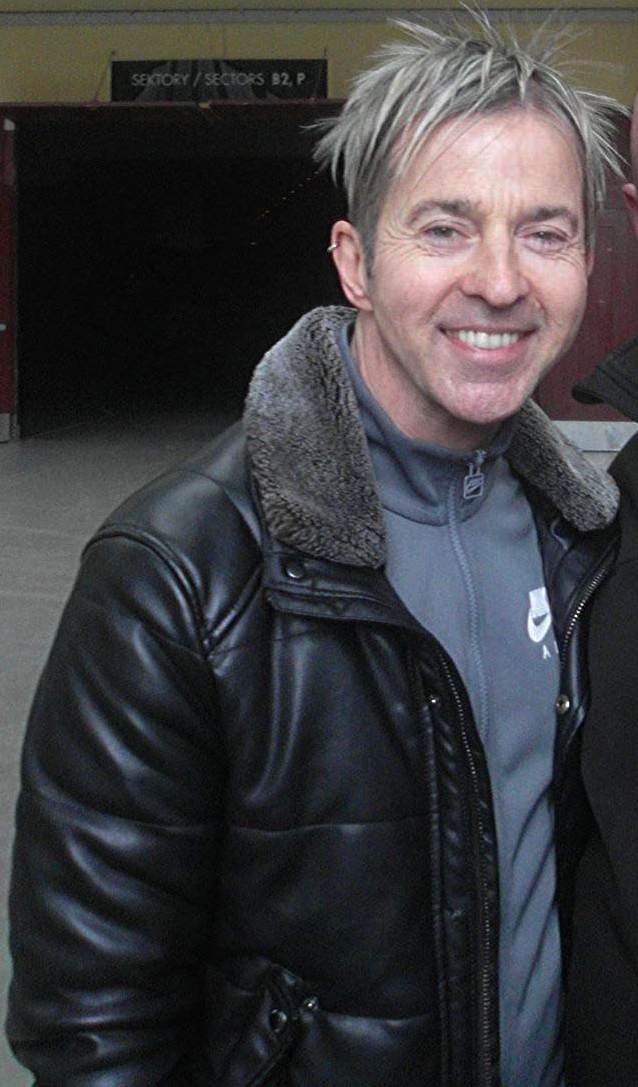
- Limahl in 2016

Background information
- Also known as: Limahl
- Born: Christopher Hamill; 19 December 1958 (age 67); Pemberton, Lancashire, England
- Genres: Pop; synth-pop; new wave
- Occupations: Singer; songwriter
- Instruments: Vocals; keyboards; percussion
- Years active: 1976–present
- Labels: EMI; Bellaphon
- Formerly of: Kajagoogoo; Vox Deus; Crossword; Brooks
- Partner: Steve Evans (1994–present)
- Website: limahl.com

Christopher Hamill (born 19 December 1958), known professionally as Limahl (/lɪˈmɑːl/ lim-AHL, an anagram of Hamill), is an English singer and songwriter. He was the lead vocalist of the pop band Kajagoogoo beginning in 1982, before embarking on a solo career, releasing the 1984 hit "The NeverEnding Story", the theme song for the 1984 film.

== Biography ==
Christopher Hamill was born on 19 December 1958 at Pemberton, Wigan, Lancashire, in North West England, to Eric and Cynthia Hamill. He has one sister and two brothers. The four children were all born by the time their mother was 22. He described it as a macho environment: his father was a coal miner and the men of the family loved and played rugby. Hamill attended Mesnes High School, Wigan, Greater Manchester before eventually enrolling at the Westcliff-on-Sea Palace Theatre Repertory Company in Essex.

== Career ==
=== Early career ===
With aspirations to be an actor, Chris Hamill toured with the company in a production of Joseph and the Amazing Technicolor Dreamcoat. In 1980, he was given a small role in an episode of the ITV police series The Gentle Touch. In 1981, he also appeared as an extra in the promotional video for Adam and the Ants' number one UK single "Stand and Deliver".

He had a keen interest in music, forming a short-lived punk band called Vox Deus. Next he joined and left a band called Crossword. Later he answered an advert in the music press to join a band to be called Brooks with Mike Nolan. Chris Hamill adopted his stage name Limahl (an anagram of his surname) at the time he was recruited by the existing members of Kajagoogoo, who were then performing under the name Art Nouveau.

=== Kajagoogoo ===
The four members of Art Nouveau, the band who were yet to become Kajagoogoo, had placed an advertisement in the music magazine Melody Maker, asking for a "front man who could sing and look good". Hamill attended the audition and subsequently joined the band which was then, after some deliberation, renamed Kajagoogoo. Soon after he had joined, Limahl met Nick Rhodes, keyboardist of the group Duran Duran, while Limahl was working as a waiter at the Embassy Club in London. Rhodes agreed to co-produce the band's first single, "Too Shy".

Limahl later said: "I met Nick Rhodes and it changed my life." Kajagoogoo signed a deal with EMI, due in part to Rhodes' involvement with the band, and the single "Too Shy" was released in January 1983. It went to number 1 in the UK Singles Chart and made the top 5 on the US Billboard Hot 100.

The group had further hits with "Ooh to Be Ah" (UK No. 7) and "Hang on Now" (UK No. 13), with their debut album White Feathers reaching UK No. 5. Their first major UK tour was attended by 60,000 people, and the final show at the Hammersmith Odeon in London was recorded and released on home video/Laserdisc (the 16-track White Feathers Tour).

In mid-1983, soon after the end of the White Feathers concert tour, the four other members of the band agreed that Limahl should be fired. As recounted years later by Nick Beggs and other Kajagoogoo members on the VH-1 program Bands Reunited, the actual firing of Limahl was done by their manager, and the band learned that it had been done over the telephone. Limahl was quoted in the press as saying: "I've been betrayed!", and "I was sacked for making them a success."

Limahl later said: "I was in utter disbelief but the overwhelming emotion was anger, mainly towards the manager at first, but later, as I mulled over the 'betrayal', I was especially angry at my four professional colleagues, who I had viewed not only as friends but almost as family." The band stated Limahl had become difficult to work with as they did not share his vision for the band's future. Soon after Limahl's departure, bassist Nick Beggs commented: "It was a business decision and not one we took lightly. He wanted the band to go in a different direction to the rest of us. Eventually, we realised we were on a different planet to Limahl." Beggs also stated the band harboured no ill will towards Limahl, and blamed the press for sensationalising the matter. Guitarist Steve Askew commented: "At first ... we did everything possible to make Limahl feel like part of the furniture, but, you know, his lifestyle is so different from ours. We're very normal people whereas Limahl likes the bright lights."

=== Solo career ===
After leaving the band, Limahl launched a solo career, achieving hits with "Only for Love" (UK No. 16) in 1983, and with "The NeverEnding Story" (UK No. 4) in 1984. The latter was the title theme from the film The NeverEnding Story, composed by Giorgio Moroder. The English version featured backing vocals by Beth Andersen. The single reached the Top 5 in several countries and was number one in Spain, Sweden, and Norway.

His debut album, 1984's Don't Suppose..., was a commercial failure in the UK, peaking at No. 63. It was better received in continental Europe, where it topped the Norwegian album chart and reached the Top 10 in Austria, Sweden and Switzerland.

Following this, Limahl released two more albums: Colour All My Days in 1986 and Love Is Blind in 1992, both of which failed to chart in the UK but found moderate success in Italy, Spain, and Germany.

In 1988, he was signed to Arista Records by Clive Davis in New York City. Six songs were recorded at a cost of $250,000, but Davis dropped Limahl from the label soon afterwards.

=== 2003–present ===
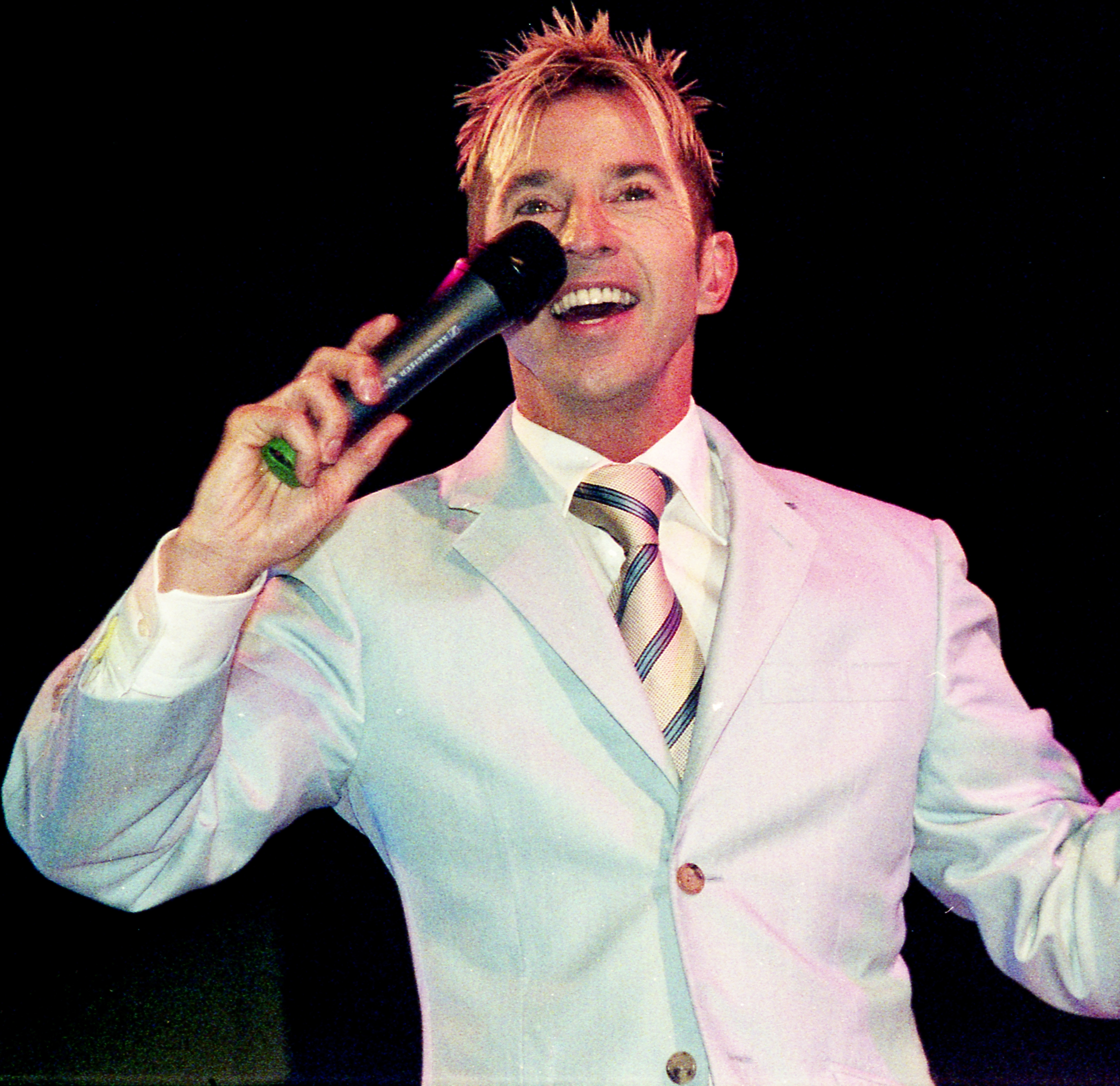
Limahl performing in 2006

In late 2003, Limahl briefly reunited with the other members of Kajagoogoo for the VH1 special Bands Reunited (which aired in 2004), but this did not lead to a permanent reunion. Also in 2004, Limahl took part in the musical reality show Comeback on German TV channel Pro7. A year later, in 2005, he appeared in a similar UK show, Hit Me Baby One More Time on ITV. The episode in which Limahl appeared also featured Howard Jones, who had enlisted the services of Kajagoogoo bass player Nick Beggs to support him during his own performance.

Limahl reunited with Kajagoogoo again in 2008. Now reformed in their original five-piece line-up, the band took part in various music festivals in Europe.

In 2011, the band released a new track, "Death-Defying Headlines", as a digital single. Limahl as a solo artist released a new single in 2012 called "1983", co-written/produced with Norwegians Tommy Olsen, Rune Maurtvedt, and Stig Antonsen. The track was released worldwide by Dig Music (Norway) on 10 January 2012.

In November 2012, Limahl appeared on ITV's I'm a Celebrity...Get Me Out of Here! He came in as a late-entrant contestant alongside Rosemary Shrager.

Limahl continued to perform mostly 1980s retro based shows, often performing as part of multi-act tours. In 2016, Limahl appeared as part of the Billboard Tour playing to audiences in Osaka and Tokyo, Japan. He featured as part of the successful Totally 80s Tour of Australia in July 2016, playing to audiences in Melbourne, Sydney, and Adelaide. In July and August 2018, he played his first shows in America as part of the Retro Futura Tour.

In July 2019, the song "The NeverEnding Story" recorded a sudden 2,063% increase in on-demand streams from 88,000 in the week ending 4 July to 1.91 million in the week ending 11 July after actors Gaten Matarazzo and Gabriella Pizzolo performed an a cappella duet of the track in the final episode of season three of Netflix series Stranger Things. In November 2019, Limahl and Kajagoogoo were featured in two episodes of season 9 of American Horror Story. On 5 June 2020, Limahl released the single "Still in Love," which was his first single released since 2012. This was followed by "One Wish for Christmas" in November. On 28 November 2020, he appeared as a guest on a late-night Channel 5 entertainment show called Jane McDonald Sings the Movies.

In March 2025, Limahl released a cover and video of America's 1971 hit song "A Horse With No Name". He also released a new version of "One Wish for Christmas" later that year, with the hopes that it will be used in West End or Broadway play. In May 2025, Limahl announced plans to produce a new album in 2026 or 2027, his first album in 30 years.

== Legacy ==
Limahl, with the hairstyle he sported circa 1984, was illustrator Arthur Adams's inspiration for the look of the Marvel Comics X-Men character Longshot.

== Personal Life ==
Hamill is gay, but due to childhood bullying and the macho atmosphere in the north of England in the 1970s found it hard to come out publicly, although he did to his mother, close friends and his band. He also found forming lasting relationships difficult in his initial years of success, but found stability with his partner Steve Evans; they have been together since 1994 and entered into a civil partnership in 2005. Hamill enjoys snooker and plays to a high level.

== Discography ==
=== Solo albums ===
Title	Album details	Peak chart positions						
Title	Album details	UK	AUT	CAN	GER	NOR	SWE	SWI
Don't Suppose	Released: 5 November 1984; Label: EMI	63	10	72	6	1	5	6
Colour All My Days	Released: 14 July 1986; Label: EMI	—	—	—	45	—	—	—
Love Is Blind	Released: 16 June 1992; Label: Bellaphon	—	—	—	—	—	—	—

=== with Kajagoogoo ===
- White Feathers (1983)

=== Solo singles ===
Year	Title	Peak chart positions												Certifications	Album
Year	Title	UK	AUS	AUT	CAN	FIN	FRA	GER	IRE	NOR	SWE	SWI	US	Certifications	Album
1980	"Angel" (as Chris Hamill)	—	—	—	—	—	—	—	—	—	—-	—	—		single releases only
1980	"It's Christmas" (as Chris Hamill)	—	—	—	—	—	—	—	—	—	—	—			single releases only
1983	"Only for Love"	16	50	9	—	6	—	8	16	—	—	5	51		Don't Suppose
1984	"Too Much Trouble"	64	—	—	—	23	—	26	—	—	—	—	—		Don't Suppose
1984	"The NeverEnding Story"	4	6	2	7	24	7	2	4	1	1	3	17	BPI: Silver	Don't Suppose
1985	"Tar Beach"	—	—	—	—	—	—	30	—	—	—	—	—		Don't Suppose
1986	"Love in Your Eyes"	80	—	—	—	—	—	28	—	—	—	26	—		Colour All My Days
1986	"Inside to Outside"	—	—	—	—	—	—	57	—	—	—	—	—		Colour All My Days
1986	"Colour All My Days"	—	—	—	—	—	—	—	—	—	—	—	—		Colour All My Days
1986	"No Lo Pienses Más"	—	—	—	—	—	—	—	—	—	—	—	—		Colour All My Days
1986	"Don't Send for Me"	—	—	—	—	—	—	—	—	—	—	—	—		Colour All My Days
1992	"Too Shy '92"	—	—	—	—	—	—	—	—	—	—	—	—		Love Is Blind
1992	"Love Is Blind"	—	—	—	—	—	—	—	—	—	—	—	—		Love Is Blind
2004	"Don't Go Breaking My Heart" (with Dynelle)	—	—	—	—	—	—	—	—	—	—	—	—		single releases only
2006	"Too Shy" (Limahl vs. Julien Créance)	—	—	—	—	—	—	—	—	—	—	—	—		single releases only
2006	"Tell Me Why"	—	—	—	—	—	—	96	—	—	—	—	—		single releases only
2012	"1983"	—	—	—	—	—	—	—	—	—	—	—	—		single releases only
2012	"London for Christmas"	—	—	—	—	—	—	—	—	—	—	—	—		single releases only
2020	"Still in Love"	—	—	—	—	—	—	—	—	—	—	—	—		single releases only
2020	"One Wish for Christmas"	—	—	—	—	—	—	—	—	—	—	—	—		single releases only
2025	"A Horse with No Name"	—	—	—	—	—	—	—	—	—	—	—	—		single releases only
"—" denotes items that did not chart or were not released in that territory.

Featured in

Year	Title	Album
1992	"Stop" (Bassline feat. Limahl)	Love Is Blind
1992	"Maybe this Time" (Bassline feat. Limahl)	Love Is Blind
1996	"Walking in Rhythm" (Shy Guy feat. Limahl)	single releases only
2002	"Love That Lasts"/"Lost in Love" (Discobrothers pres. Stars of the Eighties)	single releases only
