= Johnny Rozsa =

Johnny Rozsa is a New York-based photographer, specializing in fashion, portrait, and celebrity photography.

== Early life ==
Rozsa was born and raised in Nairobi, the son of Jewish Hungarian-Czech parents. In the early 1960s he moved to England, where he attended Repton, graduating in 1967.

== Training and career ==
Rozsa studied architecture, painting, and communications at Manchester College of Art and Design, and communications at Polytechnic of Central London. Afterwards, he interned at Vogue. He later ran a vintage shop called Nostalgia in Covent Garden, where he met fashion editors, models, actors, and photographers on a daily basis.

In the late 1970s Rozsa began his photography career, working in Nairobi, London, and the U.S. By 1978, he had a series of four full-page celebrity portraits in Ritz, with accompanying interviews.

Rozsa has photographed celebrities such as Hugh Grant, Halle Berry, Nicolas Cage, John Malkovich, and Natasha Richardson since the late 1970s. His photographs have appeared in numerous publications, including Vogue, the Sunday Times, The Observer, BLITZ, i-D, Maxim, The Face, The New York Times, and People. His portraits of Ian Charleson, Sade, Marilyn, and Martin Degville are part of the permanent collection at the National Portrait Gallery in London. His photographs of Leigh Bowery have been exhibited in several museums, including the Museum of Contemporary Art in Sydney, the Kunsthalle in Vienna, and the Kunstverein in Hanover. Rozsa has also exhibited at the Venice Biennale.

== Untouched ==
In 2010 Rozsa published a book, Untouched, featuring unretouched photos of 115 now world-famous celebrities, from their days before airbrushing, PhotoShop, digital cameras and enhancements, cosmetic surgery, and perfect images. The book has a foreword by Susan Sarandon, and launched at Barneys in New York City.

== Personal life ==
Rozsa was introduced to Buddhism by Tina Turner in 1982, and has been a Nichiren Buddhist since then. He lives in New York City.

== Bibliography ==
- Rozsa, Johnny. Untouched. Glitterati, 2010.
