= Too Shy =

1983 single by Kajagoogoo

Single by Kajagoogoo

from the album White Feathers
- B-side: "Too Shy (Instrumental)" (7", 12"); "Take Another View" (12")
- Released: 10 January 1983
- Genre: New wave; synth-pop; synth-funk; disco; bubblegum
- Length: 3:45
- Label: EMI (UK); EMI America (US)
- Songwriters: Steve Askew; Nick Beggs; Stuart Neale; Jez Strode; Christopher Hamill
- Producers: Nick Rhodes; Colin Thurston

Kajagoogoo singles chronology
| "Fear Machine" (1981) | "Too Shy" (1983) | "Ooh to Be Ah" (1983) |

Music video
- "Too Shy" on YouTube

"Too Shy '92"

Single by Limahl

from the album Love Is Blind
- B-side: "Too Shy '92 Remix (Acapella)" (7")
- Released: 1992
- Length: 4:12
- Label: Bellaphon
- Songwriters: Steve Askew; Nick Beggs; Stuart Neale; Jez Strode; Christopher Hamill
- Producer: Limahl

Limahl singles chronology
| "Maybe This Time" (1992) | "Too Shy '92" (1992) | "Love Is Blind" (1992) |

Audio video
- "Too Shy" ('92 remix) on YouTube

"Too Shy" is a song written and recorded by the English pop band Kajagoogoo, released in January 1983. The first single from their debut studio album White Feathers, the song was an immediate hit and reached No. 1 on the UK singles chart for two weeks. It was also very successful in other European countries and Japan, spending five weeks at No. 1 in Germany, also reaching No. 1 in Belgium and Ireland, as well as reaching No. 2 in France and Switzerland, and No. 4 in Sweden, Austria, and the Netherlands, No. 6 in Australia and no 5 in the US. In the UK, it became the 13th best-selling single of 1983.

Assisted by heavy rotation on MTV, the song later became a success in the United States, peaking at No. 5 on the Billboard Hot 100. "Too Shy" is Kajagoogoo's only significant hit in the US, where the band is widely regarded as a one-hit wonder. In the UK, Kajagoogoo had further hits, including two more top 10 singles: "Ooh to Be Ah" and "Big Apple", both in 1983.

== Production ==
"Too Shy" was written by Kajagoogoo and produced by Duran Duran keyboardist Nick Rhodes and Colin Thurston, the latter of whom had produced Duran Duran's first two albums. In 2006, "Too Shy" was ranked No. 27 on VH1's 100 Greatest Songs of the 80's and No. 9 on VH1's 100 Greatest One Hit Wonders of the 80s.

== Music video ==
The music video directed by Simon Milne, cast model Carolyn Espley (later wife of Dennis Miller) as a waitress cleaning up a nightclub at the end of the night. As the band performs the song on the club stage, she has visions of dancers from different eras populating the dance floor.

== Chart performance ==
The song was an immediate hit, topping the UK singles chart for two weeks. It spent five weeks at No. 1 in Germany, and reaching No. 2 in Switzerland, and No. 4 in Sweden, Austria, and the Netherlands. The song was also a top 10 hit in the United States during the summer of 1983.

The 12" maxi single's B-side, "Take Another View", a non-album track, often performed live, was included on the 2004 re-issue of White Feathers, which contained several bonus tracks, including the instrumental version of "Too Shy", originally featured on the B-sides of both the 7" and 12" singles.

=== Weekly charts ===
| Chart (1983) | Peak position |
|---|---|
| Australia (Kent Music Report) | 6 |
| Austria (Ö3 Austria Top 40) | 4 |
| Belgium (Ultratop 50 Flanders) | 1 |
| Canada Top Singles (RPM) | 8 |
| France (IFOP) | 2 |
| Ireland (IRMA) | 1 |
| Italy (Musica e dischi) | 6 |
| Japan (Oricon International Chart) | 1 |
| Japan (Oricon Singles Chart) | 23 |
| Netherlands (Dutch Top 40) | 4 |
| Netherlands (Single Top 100) | 5 |
| New Zealand (Recorded Music NZ) | 2 |
| South Africa (Springbok Radio) | 11 |
| Spain (AFYVE) | 19 |
| Sweden (Sverigetopplistan) | 4 |
| Switzerland (Schweizer Hitparade) | 2 |
| UK Singles (Official Charts) | 1 |
| US Billboard Hot 100 | 5 |
| US Billboard Hot Dance Club Play | 25 |
| US Billboard Top Tracks | 23 |
| US Cash Box | 5 |
| West Germany (GfK) | 1 |

=== Year-end charts ===
| Chart (1983) | Position |
|---|---|
| Australia (Kent Music Report) | 84 |
| Belgium (Ultratop 50 Flanders) | 59 |
| Canada Top Singles (RPM) | 72 |
| France (IFOP) | 7 |
| Netherlands (Dutch Top 40) | 37 |
| Netherlands (Single Top 100) | 26 |
| Switzerland (Schweizer Hitparade) | 16 |
| US Billboard Hot 100 | 50 |
| US Cash Box | 42 |

=== Certifications and sales ===
| Region | Certification | Certified units/sales |
|---|---|---|
| France (SNEP) | Gold | 500,000^{*} |
| United Kingdom (BPI) | Gold | 500,000^{^} |
^{*} Sales figures based on certification alone.^{^} Shipments figures based on certification alone.

== Appearances ==
The extended version of the song, titled "Midnight Mix", can be heard in the Rockstar video game Grand Theft Auto: Vice City Stories, played on the in-game radio station Wave 103. It also appears as a collectable cassette tape in Metal Gear Solid V: The Phantom Pain. A Simlish version of the song is also featured in The Sims 2 expansion pack, The Sims 2: Open for Business. The song also features in the Black Mirror interactive film Bandersnatch on Netflix. It can also be heard in the 1998 film The Wedding Singer during the engagement party scene.

== See also ==
- List of number-one hits of 1983 (Germany)
- List of number-one singles of 1983 (Ireland)
- List of UK singles chart number ones of the 1980s
