= The NeverEnding Story (song) =

Single by Limahl

from the album Don't Suppose and The NeverEnding Story (Original Motion Picture Soundtrack)
- B-side: "Ivory Tower"
- Released: 24 September 1984
- Genre: Synth-pop; new wave
- Length: 3:32
- Label: EMI
- Composer: Giorgio Moroder
- Lyricist: Keith Forsey
- Producer: Giorgio Moroder

Limahl singles chronology
"Too Much Trouble" (1984)	"The NeverEnding Story" (1984)	"Tar Beach" (1984)

Music video
- "Never Ending Story" on YouTube

"The NeverEnding Story", often known as "Never Ending Story", is the title song from the English version of the 1984 film The NeverEnding Story. It was produced and composed by Italian musician Giorgio Moroder and performed by English pop singer Limahl. He released two versions of the song: one in English and one in French. The English version features vocals by Beth Andersen, and the French version, titled "L'Histoire sans fin", featured vocals by Ann Calvert. It was a success in many countries, reaching No. 1 in Norway, Spain and Sweden, No. 4 in the United Kingdom, and No. 6 on the US Billboard Adult Contemporary chart.

== Background and writing ==
The song was composed by Giorgio Moroder with lyrics by Keith Forsey, though it (and other electronic pop elements of the soundtrack) is not present in the German version of the film, which features Klaus Doldinger's score exclusively.

Before Limahl recorded the track, the choice for lead vocalist was Daniel, Yugoslavia's representative at the Eurovision Song Contest 1983. Beth Andersen recorded her words in the USA separately from Limahl's. Andersen does not appear in the music video; frequent Limahl back-up singer Mandy Newton lip-syncs Andersen's part.

== Legacy ==
In the final episode of the third season of Stranger Things, set in 1985, "Never Ending Story" is sung by Dustin (Gaten Matarazzo) and his long-distance girlfriend Suzie (Gabriella Pizzolo) as a way to reconnect after not seeing each other for some time. Following the season's release on July 4, 2019, interest in "The NeverEnding Story" surged; viewership of the original music video had increased by 800% within a few days according to YouTube, while Spotify reported an 825% increase in stream requests for the song. Limahl expressed gratitude towards Netflix for this; while he had not watched the series, he was told of the song's inclusion by his nephews and watched clips of the duet. Limahl had previously found a similar increase in his past work when the network used his band Kajagoogoo's song "Too Shy" in Black Mirror: Bandersnatch.

In 2022, the Spanish stage production La Historia Interminable, El Musical, welcomed Limahl to the stage to perform the song with the cast, including Teresa Ferrer as Xayide and Teresa Abarca and Alba Cuartero, who alternated as the Childlike Empress. In June 2024, ITV used an arrangement of the song in their opening for coverage of the UEFA European Football Championship.

== Track listings ==
- 7-inch single
1. "Never Ending Story"
2. "Ivory Tower" by Giorgio Moroder
- 12-inch single
1. "Never Ending Story" (club mix) – 6:09
2. "Never Ending Story" (instrumental version) – 5:28
- 12-inch maxi
1. "Never Ending Story" (12-inch mix) – 5:17
2. "Never Ending Story" (7-inch mix) – 3:30
3. "Ivory Tower" (12-inch mix) (instrumental) by Giorgio Moroder – 5:54
- iTunes single
1. "Never Ending Story" (12-inch mix) – 5:20
2. "Never Ending Story" (Giorgio 7-inch mix) – 3:31
3. "Never Ending Story" (Rusty 7-inch mix) – 3:54
4. "Never Ending Story" (12-inch dance mix) – 6:08
5. "Never Ending Story" (12-inch dub mix) – 5:27
6. "Ivory Tower" by Giorgio Moroder – 3:08
7. "Ivory Tower" (12-inch mix) by Giorgio Moroder – 5:55

== Personnel ==
- Limahl – vocals
- Beth Andersen – featuring
- Dee Harris – electric guitar
- Arthur Barrow – synthesizers

== Charts ==
=== Weekly charts ===
Chart (1984–1985)	Peak position
Australia (Kent Music Report)	6
Austria (Ö3 Austria Top 40)	2
Canada Adult Contemporary (RPM)	3
Denmark (IFPI)	3
Europe (European Hot 100 Singles)	8
Finland (Suomen virallinen lista)	24
France (SNEP)	7
Ireland (IRMA)	4
Italy (Musica e dischi)	2
Netherlands (Dutch Top 40)	34
Netherlands (Single Top 100)	28
New Zealand (Recorded Music NZ)	28
Norway (VG-lista)	1
Portugal (AFP)	3
South Africa (Springbok Radio)	2
Spain (AFYVE)	1
Sweden (Sverigetopplistan)	1
Switzerland (Schweizer Hitparade)	3
UK Singles (Official Charts)	4
US Billboard Hot 100	17
US 12-inch Singles Sales (Billboard)	23
US Adult Contemporary (Billboard)	6
US Dance/Disco Club Play (Billboard)	10
West Germany (GfK)	2

=== Year-end charts ===
Chart (1984)	Position
Australia (Kent Music Report)	49
Austria (Ö3 Austria Top 40)	11
UK Singles (OCC)	48
West Germany (Media Control)	19

Chart (1985)	Position
South Africa (Springbok Radio)	20

== Certifications ==
Region	Certification	Certified units/sales
Italy (FIMI)	Gold	50,000^{‡}
United Kingdom (BPI)	Silver	250,000^{^}
^{^} Shipments figures based on certification alone.^{‡} Sales+streaming figures based on certification alone.

== Cover versions ==
- For The NeverEnding Story II: The Next Chapter, the song was performed by Joe Milner, heard during the closing credits.
- For The NeverEnding Story III, the song was performed by Real Im-Pact.
- American pop-punk group New Found Glory covered the song on their 2000 EP From the Screen to Your Stereo.
- Danish teen‑pop duo Creamy covered the song in a euro‑pop style in 2000 for their second album, We Got the Time. This cover was also released as the duo's only UK single in 2001.
- An Eurodance cover of the song was released by DJ AC-DC on the album Dancemania X9 in 2001. This cover was used in Dance Dance Revolution 5thMix in 2001, Dancing Stage EuroMix 2 in 2002, and the North American PS2 release of Dance Dance Revolution Extreme in 2004. It was also added to StepManiaX in 2021.
