= Flyway (disambiguation) =

A flyway is a bird migration flight path

Flyway may also refer to:

- Flyway (magazine), Iowa State University journal
- Flyway (software), a Java database migration framework
- Flyways Linhas Aéreas, a Brazilian airline
- Flyway Club, a shooting club in North Carolina, US
- Flyway Film Festival, a festival in Pepin, Wisconsin, US

== See also ==
- Airway (disambiguation)
- Flight plan (disambiguation)
- Flightpath (disambiguation)
- Fly Away (disambiguation)
- Skyway (disambiguation)
