= Flightpath (disambiguation) =

Flightpath or trajectory is the path of a moving object.

Flightpath or flight path may also refer to:

- Flight path, an airplane route
- Flightpath (marketing agency), a New York-based digital creative agency
- FlightPath (software), an academic advising software
- Flight Path Learning Center
- FlightPathTV, a television show
- Flight Path (album), an album by Sphere
- "Flight Path", a 1971 episode of TV series UFO
- Flight Path (memoir), a 2017 memoir by Hannah Palmer

== See also ==
- Flight Paths, an album by The Paradise Motel
- Airway (disambiguation)
- Flight plan (disambiguation)
- Flyway (disambiguation)
- Flyway for birds
