= Skybridge =

Skybridge may refer to:

- Skyway or skybridge, a type of pedestrian bridge
- Jet bridge or skybridge, a retractable connecting bridge between an airport and an aircraft
- SkyBridge (people mover), a people mover in Rome
- SkyBridge (TransLink), a bridge in Metro Vancouver, Canada
- Skybridge, Chicago, a building in Chicago, United States
- SkyBridge Capital, an American investment firm
- Sky Bridge 721, a bridge in Dolní Morava, Czech Republic
- Davenport Skybridge, a bridge in Iowa, United States
- Gatlinburg Skybridge, a bridge in Tennessee, United States
- Langkawi Sky Bridge, a bridge in Malaysia

== See also ==
- Skye Bridge, a bridge in Scotland
- Airbridge (disambiguation)
- Skywalk (disambiguation)
- Skyway (disambiguation)
