= South Dakota Review =

- Discipline: Literary journal
- Language: English
- Edited by: Lee Ann Roripaugh

Publication details
- History: 1963-present
- Publisher: University of South Dakota (United States)
- Frequency: Quarterly

Standard abbreviations
- ISO 4: S. D. Rev.

Indexing
- ISSN: 0038-3368

Links
- Journal homepage

The South Dakota Review (SDR) is a quarterly literary magazine published by the University of South Dakota.

== History and profile ==
SDR was founded in 1963 by John R. Milton and is currently edited by Lee Ann Roripaugh. Past associate editors include Eileen Sullivan and Theo Bohn. The magazine has its headquarters in Vermillion.

SDR publishes poetry, fiction, interview, and literary non-fiction by both emerging and established writers of considerable skill. Recent contributors of note include Philip Heldrich, Tricia Currans-Sheehan, Jacob M. Appel, Gary Fincke, Eileen Sullivan, and Mark Sanders.

== See also ==
- List of literary magazines
