= Langkawi Cable Car =

Gondola lift in Langkawi Island, Kedah, Malaysia

- Kereta kabel Langkawi
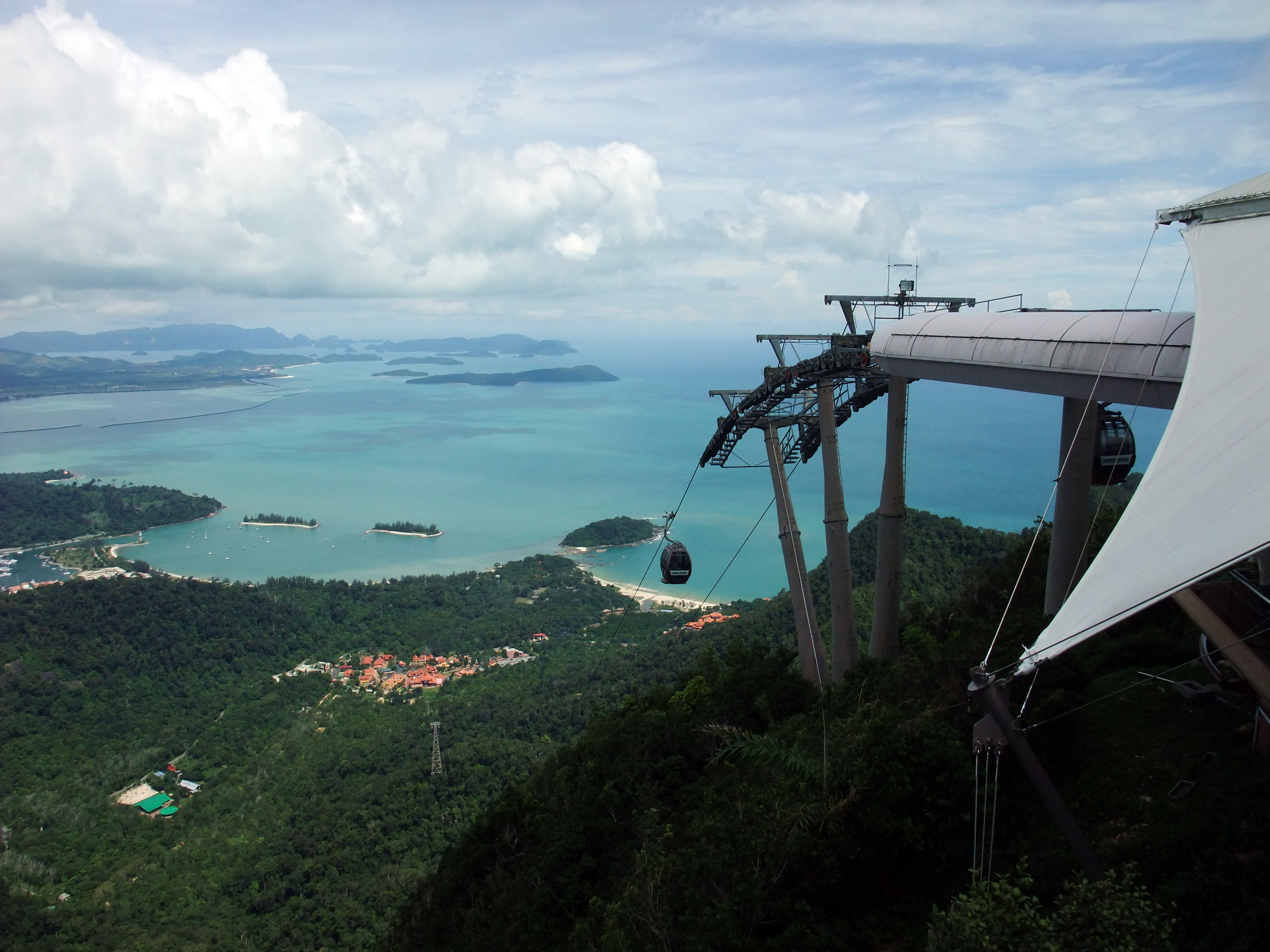
- View of Langkawi Cable Car from the Top Station

- Location of Langkawi Cable Car

Overview
- Status: Operational
- System: Gondola lift
- Location: Langkawi
- Country: Malaysia
- Coordinates: 6°22′17″N 99°40′18″E
- Termini: Oriental Village, Burau Bay; Gunung Mat Chinchang (peak)
- No. of stations: 3
- Services: 1
- Construction begin: 16 months (April 2001 - August 2002)
- Open: 1 November 2002; 23 years ago
- Website: www.panoramalangkawi.com

Operation
- Owner: Langkawi Development Authority (LADA)
- Operator: Panorama Langkawi Sdn Bhd
- No. of carriers: 35 units
- Carrier capacity: 6 passenger per cabin
- Trip duration: 15 min
- Fare: MYR55.00

Technical features
- Aerial lift type: 6-MGD
- Manufactured by: Doppelmayr Garaventa Group
- Line length: 2200 meter
- No. of support towers: 2
- No. of cables: 3
- Cable diameter: 50mm
- Operating speed: 5m/sec (design), 3m/sec (operating)

The Langkawi Cable Car, also known as Langkawi SkyCab, is a gondola lift and one of the major attractions in Langkawi Island, Kedah, Malaysia. It provides an aerial link from the Oriental Village at Teluk Burau to the peak of Gunung Machinchang, which is also the location of the Langkawi Sky Bridge. The total length is 2.2 km (1.4 mi), with a journey time from the base to the top of around 15 minutes. It was officially opened in 2003.

Langkawi Cable Car is located just north of Telaga Harbour, Pantai Kok, with the entrance within 'Oriental Village' at the foothill of the Mat Chincang mountain range. It is located to the north-west of the Langkawi International Airport, on the west coast of the main island of Langkawi. It is approximate 30 minutes drive from Kuah town and 15 minutes drive from Langkawi International Airport.

== Construction and design ==
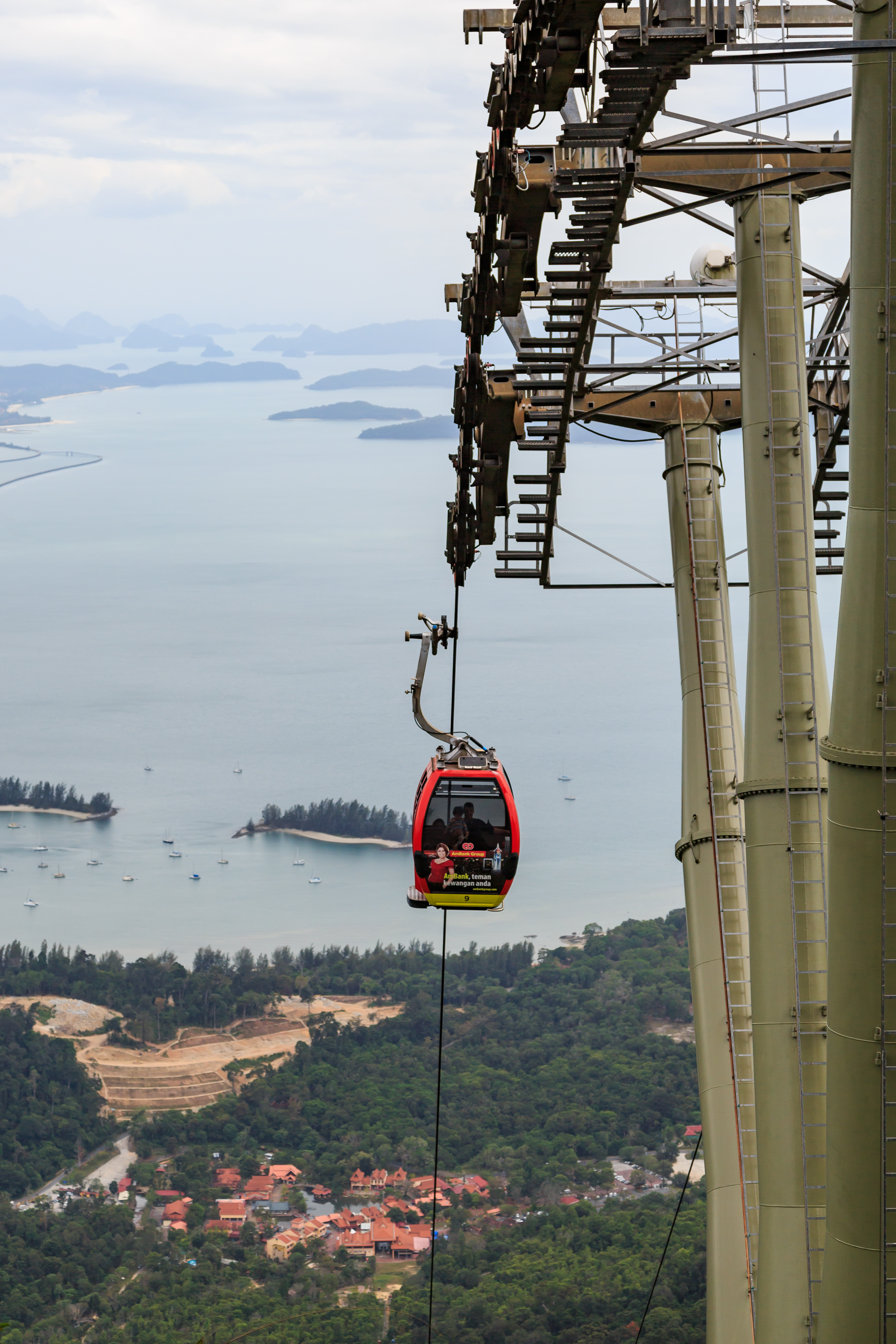
Langkawi Cable Car

The Langkawi cable car project was first mooted in 1999 by the then Prime Minister Mahathir Mohamad when he flew over Gunung Machinchang in a helicopter during his visit to Langkawi. The project was a joint venture by Doppelmayr of Austria and a local company.

After a survey of the mountain conducted in May 2000, the construction of Langkawi Cable Car began in April 2001. The gondola cable car system was selected as it permitted a long span of over 900 metres (3,000 ft). There are three stations for the cable car; the Top Station is located at the peak of Gunung Machinchang which is the second-highest peak of Langkawi. In the middle is an "angle station" where the gondolas make a 45-degree turn to reach the Top Station. As there is no road to the top due to the steepness of Gunung Machinchang, all the structural components needed to be lifted to top with helicopters in combination with an auxiliary working cable and then assembled on site.

The gradient or the slope between the Base Station and the Middle Station is said to be one of the steepest in the world at 42°. It has the longest free span for a mono-cable car at 950 m (3,120 ft). When there are strong winds, the cable car operation would be put on hold. There are 35 normal gondolas, each of these can carry six persons with total weight up to 480 kg (1,060 lb), with a total maximum capacity of 700 to 800 passengers per hour. There are also 4 bottom glass gondolas which sit 6 passengers and 2 VIP gondolas each with 3 leather seats. The gondolas travel at a distance of some 70 meters (230 ft) above the canopy of forest of the Machinchang Range.

The Langkawi cable car was completed in August 2002 at a cost of RM 46 million. The soft launch for the cable car was held for six days in October 2002 which was well-received, it then opened to the general public on 1 November 2002. It was officially opened in 2003.

== Stations ==
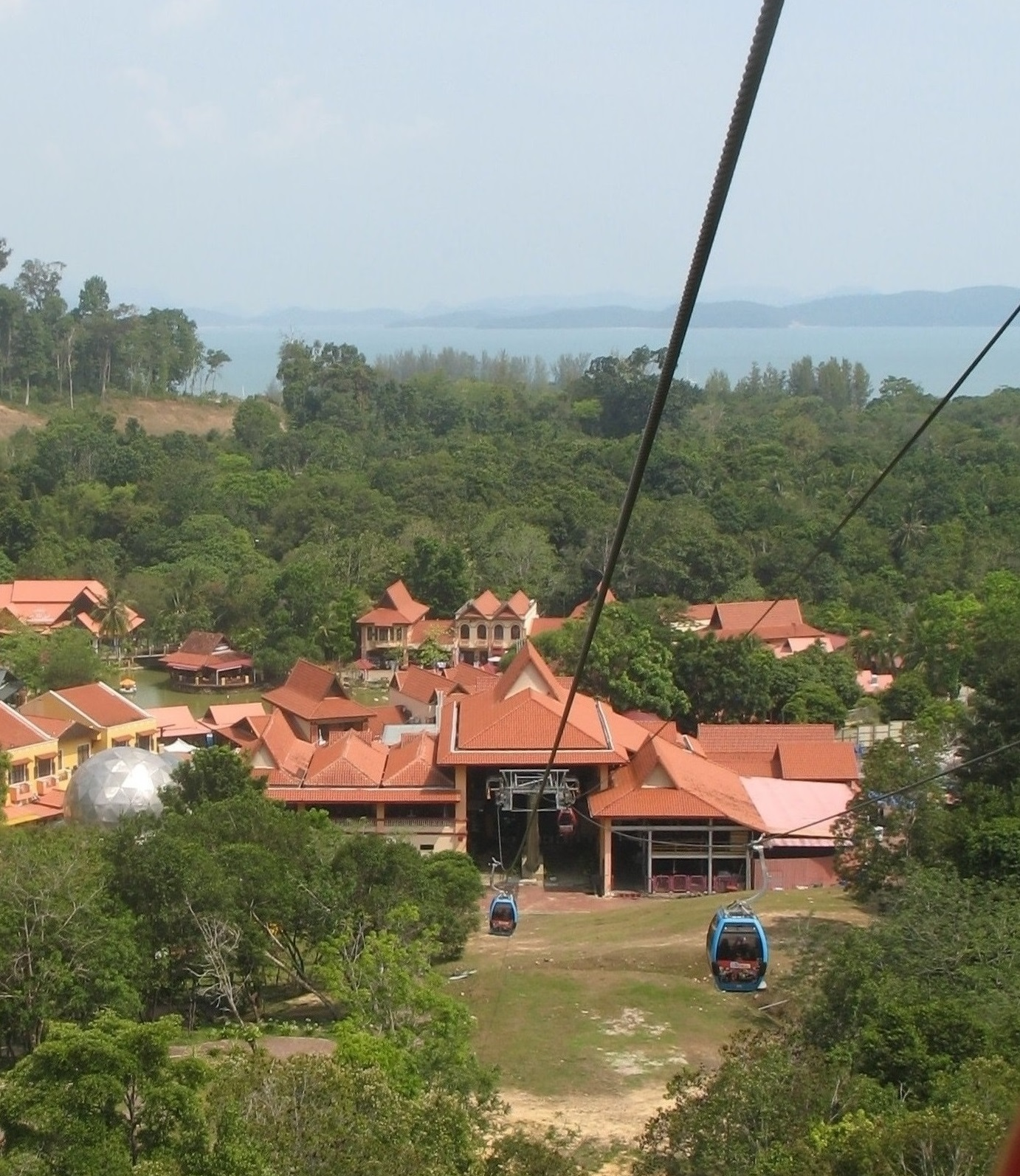
View of the Base Station located at the Oriental Village from a gondola.

=== Base Station ===
The Base Station is located at the Oriental Village, a theme shopping centre housing 30 individually designed buildings showcasing Malaysian and Oriental architecture. From this base, visitors can take the ride to the Machincang range via the Langkawi Cable Car on gondolas. The SkyDome, a 360-degree panorama screen dome theatre located at the Base Station, offers visitors free viewing while they are waiting for their ride on the Cable Car. The gondolas arrive at the station around every 30 seconds. The cable car may be closed 2 days a month in a predetermined maintenance schedule, and in bad weather condition.

=== Middle Station ===
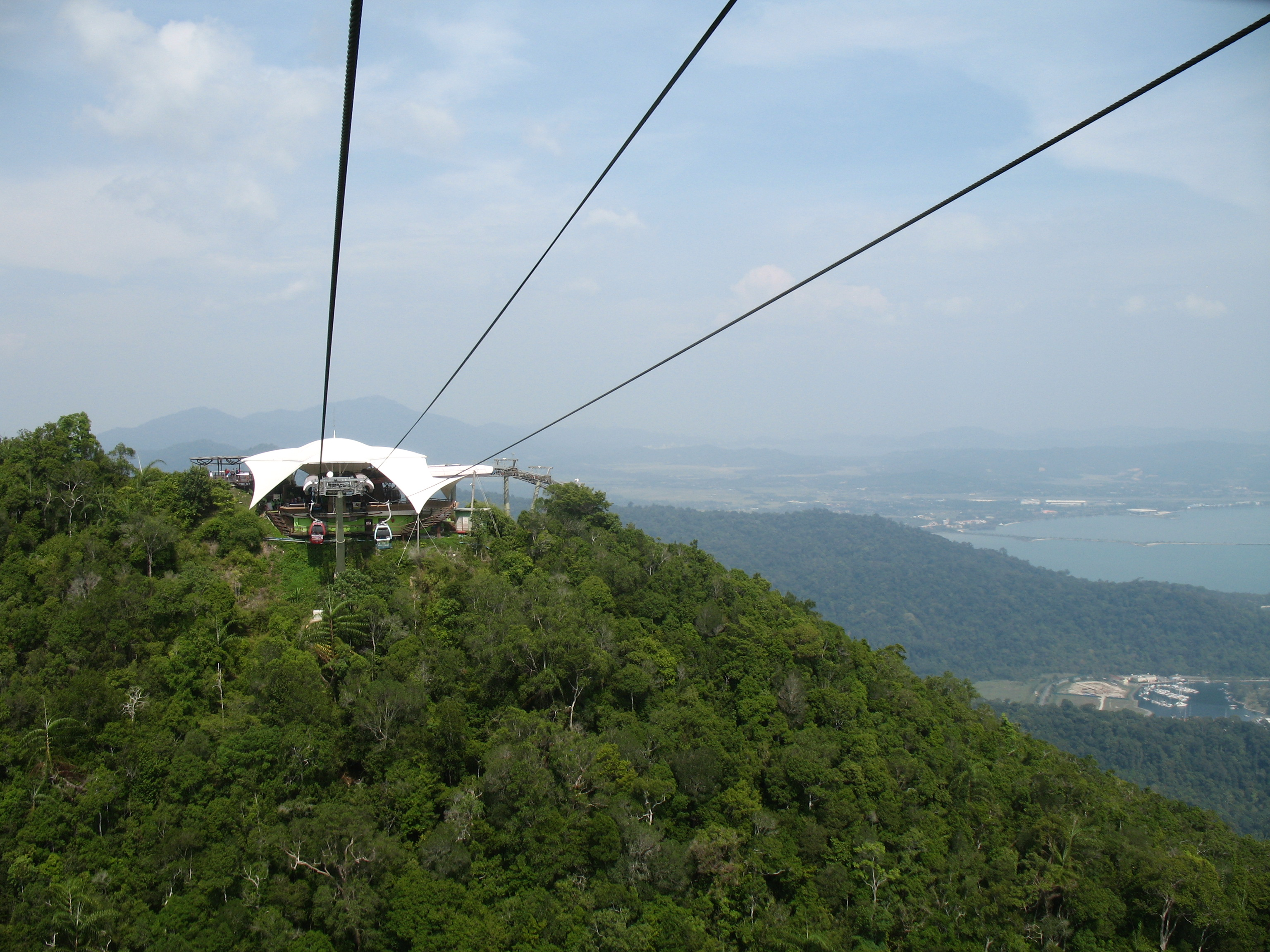
View of the Middle Station from the Top Station

An intermediate Cable Car station on the eastern ridges provides access to the eastern cliffs with its 3 vertical chimneys and the 360-degree views. The gondolas make a 45-degree turn at this "angle station" to reach the top.

The journey from the Base Station to Middle Station covers 1,700 meters (5,600 ft) in length. The Middle Station is at an elevation of 650 m (2,130 ft) above sea level, visitors can alight at the station and walk up to the viewing platform, or continue to travel on the gondolas for another 450 meters (1,480 ft) up to the Top Station.

=== Top Station ===
There are two circular viewing platforms at the top of Gunung Machinchang, which are both a short walk up the stairs from the top station and offer 360° views. The top station is located 708 m (2,323 ft) above sea-level is about 5 °C cooler than the lowlands.

== Features ==
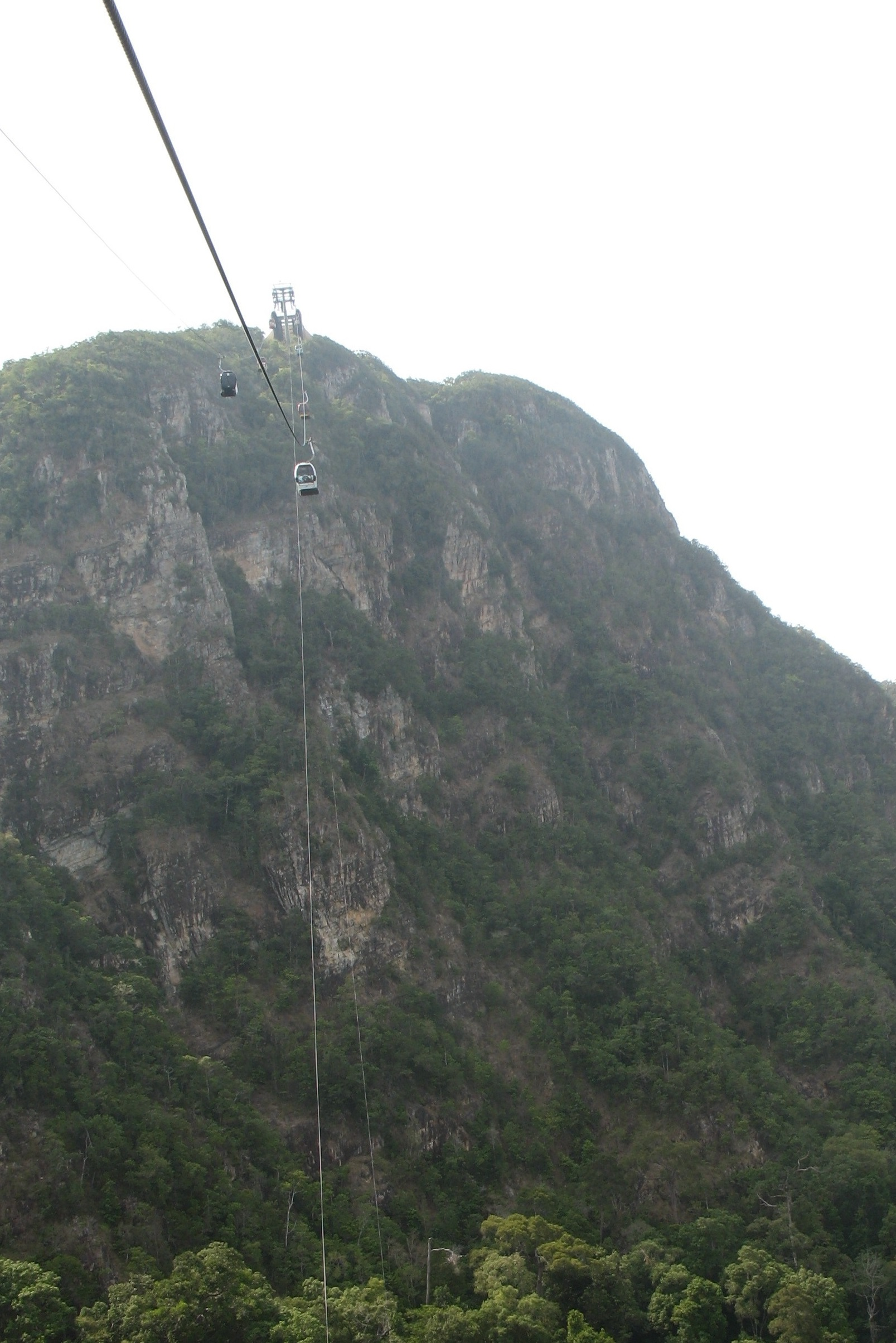
Approaching the peak where the Middle Station is located

The ride affords a view of the surrounding forest, the Seven Wells Waterfall (Telaga Tujuh), as well as the sea. From the top station, there is an inclinator called SkyGlide and a mountain route that allow access to the Langkawi Sky Bridge. There are two viewing platforms at the top of Machincang mountain, and other amenities.

There is a 2.5 km (1.6 mi) walking trail, the SkyTrail, through the forest from the top station that goes down to the middle station, and then the Seven Wells Waterfall, although walking unguided through the trail is not advisable as the trail is not well-maintained and there is a risk of getting lost. Pre-arrangement with a naturalist guide is necessary. There are some safety issues raised by some of the tourists.

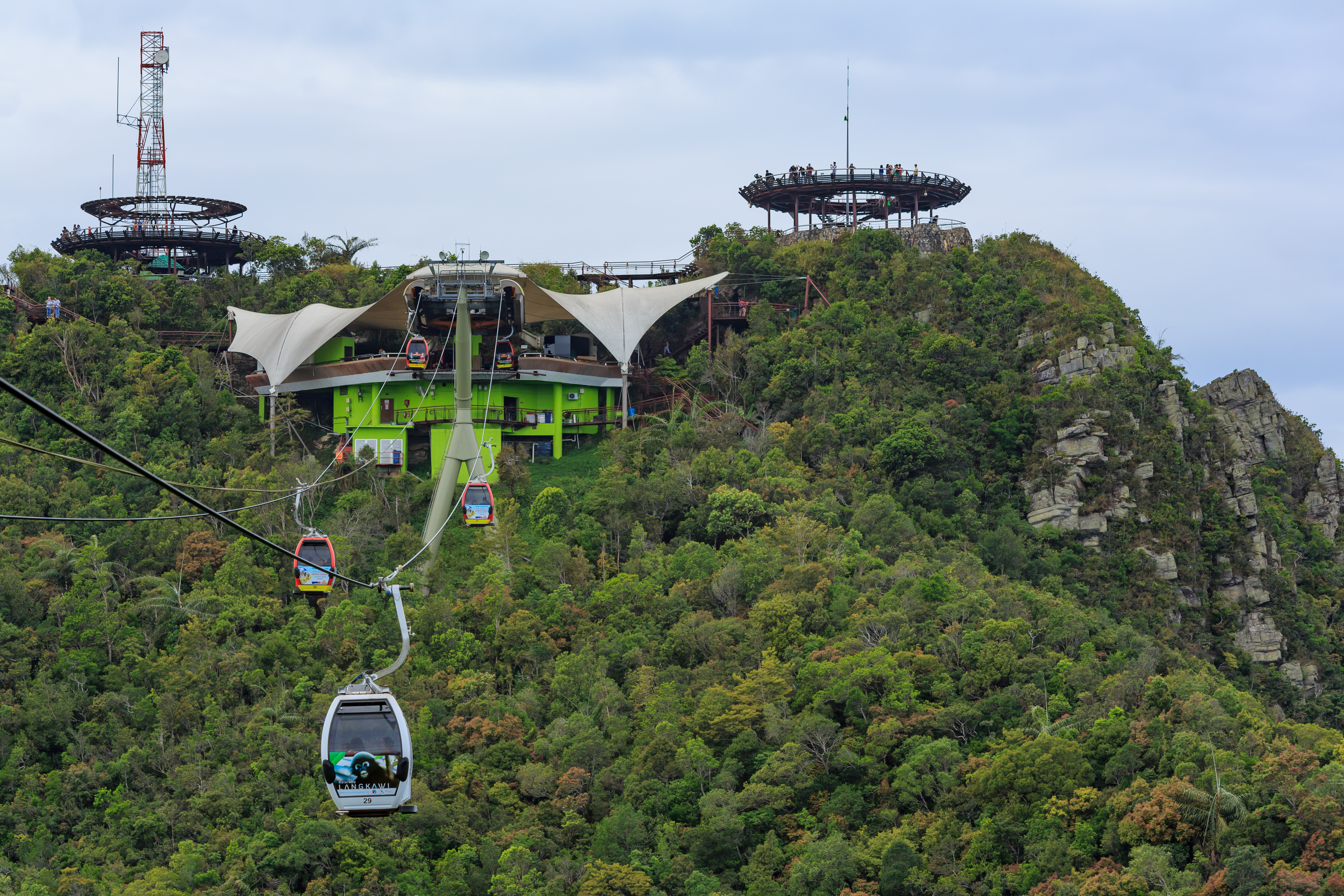
Cable Car Top Station, the two circular viewing platforms are visible

== Technical data ==
- Horizontal distance: 2079 m
- Vertical rise: 680 m
- Inclined distance: 2158 m
- Haul rope diameter: 50 mm
- Bull wheel diameter: 6.10 m
- Passenger per gondola: 6 persons
- Design speed: 5 m/s
- Operating speed: 3 m/s
- Turn around trip time: 28 minute
- Hourly capacity: 700 passengers/hour
- Number of stations: 3
- Number of in-line towers: 2
- Height of Tower 1: 38 m
- Height of Tower 2: 70 m
- Longest free span: 919.5 m (between Tower 2 & Middle station)
- Steepest gradient: 42 degrees
- Construction period: 16 months (April 2001 - August 2002)
- Testing & Commissioning period: 3 months (August 2002 - October 2002)

== See also ==
- Awana Skyway - Aerial tramway type
- Genting Skyway - Gondola lift type
- Penang Hill cable car

== Key points ==
- 6.371363°N 99.671552°E Burau Bay Resort station
- 6.385341°N 99.661875°E Gunung Machinchang station (708 m [2,323 ft] above sea level)
