= Airway (disambiguation) =

An airway is a part of the respiratory system through which air flows.

Airway or similar may also refer to:

- Airway (automobile)
- Airway (aviation), an aerial route taken by airplanes
- Airway (band), a musical ensemble based within the Los Angeles Free Music Society
- Air Ways, an Australian television series
- Airways News, or Airways, an American commercial aviation magazine
- "The Airway", a song by Owl City from Of June
- The main ventilation artery in underground mine ventilation

== See also ==
- Jetway, an enclosed movable bridge which extends from an airport terminal gate to an airplane
- Flyway, an aerial route taken by migrating birds
- Flyway (disambiguation)
- Skyway (disambiguation)
- Flightpath (disambiguation)
