= Langkawi =

- District of Kedah
- Daerah Langkawi
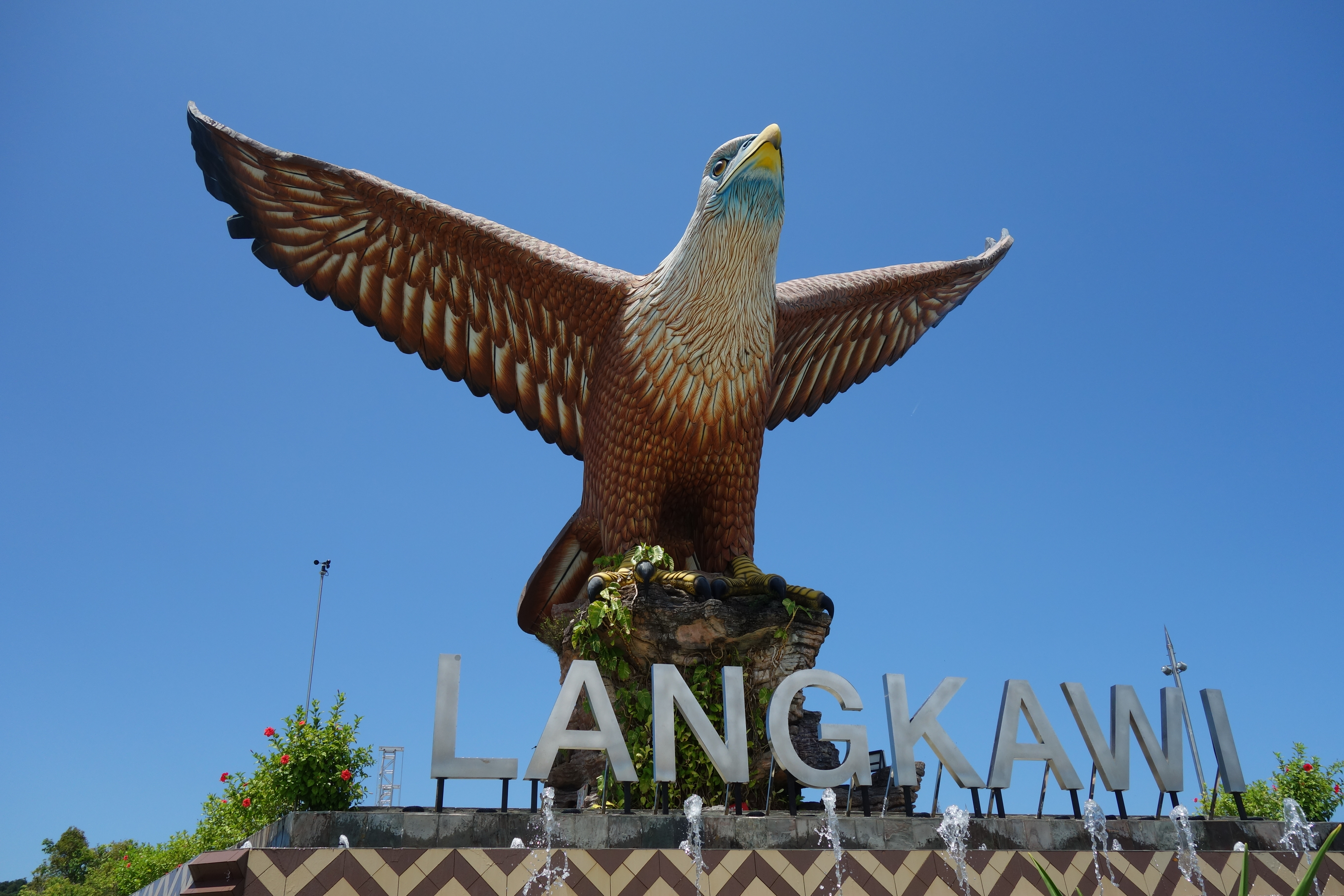
- Eagle Square at Kuah, in Langkawi

- Seal
- Nicknames: Jewel of Kedah (Permata Kedah), Tourism City (Bandaraya Pelancongan)
- Interactive map of Langkawi
- Location of Langkawi in Malaysia Langkawi (Peninsular Malaysia) Langkawi (Malaysia)
- Coordinates: 6°21′N 99°48′E
- Country: Malaysia
- State: Kedah
- Seat: Kuah
- Local area government(s): Tourism City of Langkawi Municipal Council

Government
  - District officer: Abdul Gafar Yahya

Area
  - Total: 478.48 km^{2} (184.74 sq mi)

Population (2010)
  - Total: 85,588
  - Density: 178.87/km^{2} (463.28/sq mi)
- Time zone: UTC+8 (MST)
- Postcode: 07xxx
- Calling code: +6-04
- Vehicle registration plates: KV

Langkawi, officially known as Langkawi, the Jewel of Kedah (Malay: Langkawi Permata Kedah), is a duty-free island and an archipelago of 99 islands (plus five small islands visible only at low tide in the Strait of Malacca) located some 30 kilometres (19 mi) off the coast of northwestern Malaysia and a few kilometres south of Ko Tarutao, adjacent to the Thai border. Politically, it is an administrative district of Kedah, with Kuah as its largest town. Langkawi was developed as a tourist destination in the 1980s, and Pantai Cenang is the island's most popular beach and tourist area.

== Etymology ==
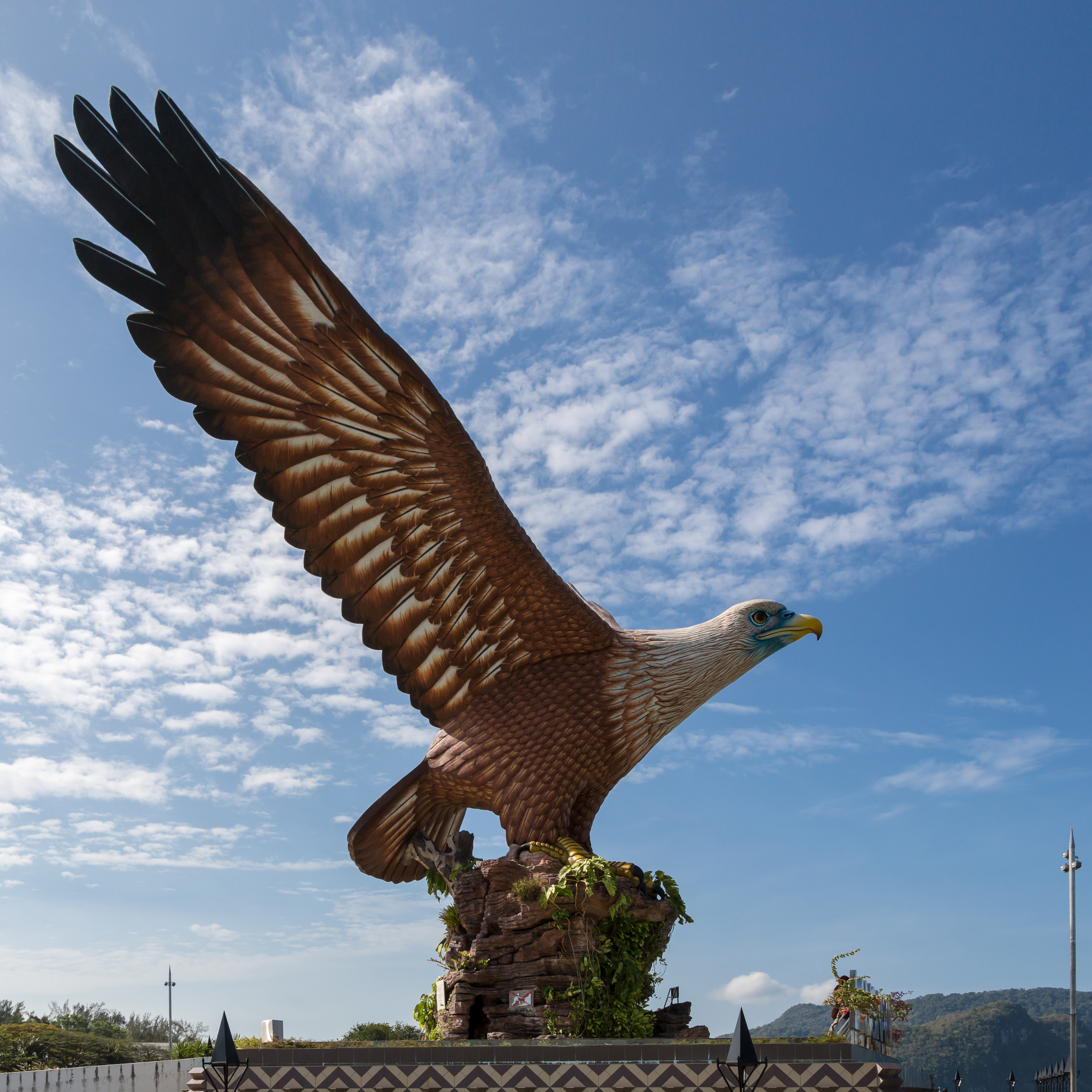
Dataran Helang (Eagle Square)

The name Langkawi is thought to have existed by the early 15th century, although in the 16th century the island of Langkawi was also marked on maps variously as Langa, Langka, Lansura, and Langapura.

There are many suggestions for the origin of the name of Langkawi. According to one interpretation, Langkawi means island of the reddish-brown eagle, a brahminy kite in colloquial Malay. The Malay word for eagle is helang (colloquially shortened to lang), and kawi is a red stone used as a chalk to mark goods. This interpretation was used to create the landmark sculpture of an eagle as the symbol of Langkawi at Dataran Helang (Eagle Square) in Kuah.

Some believed that Langkawi is the same as, or related to, the Lanka or Langkapuri mentioned in Indian sources such as the Ramayana. This ancient name Lanka (or Lankapura and Lankapuri) is found in Indian literature from an early period (named in Ramayana as the city of the king Ravana), although the identification of the original Lanka is not certain. Puri or puram in Sanskrit means a town or city. The name Langkawi is also thought to be related to Langkasuka, an old kingdom believed to have links with Kedah. Some also thought that Langkawi means "many beautiful islands", langka being a Sanskrit word meaning "beautiful" while wi means "many".

In 2008, the Sultan Abdul Halim of Kedah, conferred the title of Langkawi Permata Kedah (meaning 'Langkawi, the Jewel of Kedah') upon the island as part of his golden jubilee as an affirmation of Kedah's ownership over the island.

== History ==
Langkawi had long been at the periphery of, but closely associated with, the domain of the Kedah Sultanate. Legend tells of a great snake ular besar, the custodian of the Langkawi Islands, to which a new king of Kedah must sacrifice a virgin daughter whenever he ascended the throne, or when war was declared with another state.

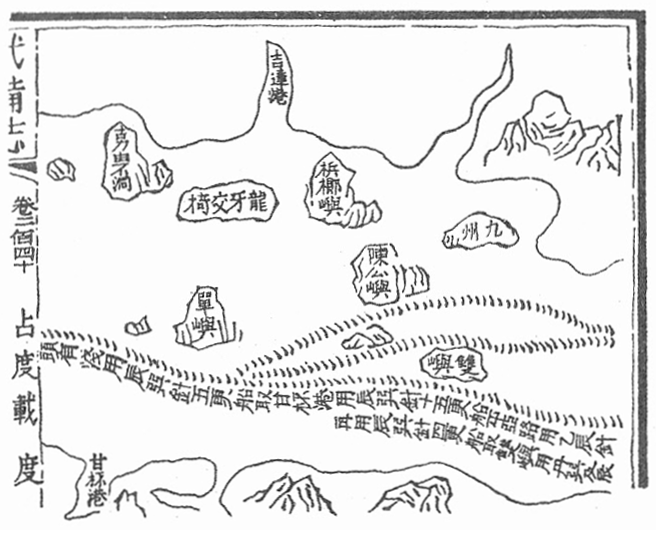
The Mao Kun map from Wubei Zhi, derived from the 15th century navigation maps of Zheng He, shows Langkawi (龍牙交椅) next to Penang Island (檳榔嶼)

The island of Langkawi was recorded in history by various travellers to the region. It was called Lóngyápútí (龍牙菩提) in the 14th century by the Yuan dynasty traveller Wang Dayuan. When the Ming dynasty admiral Zheng He visited the region, the island was marked as 龍牙交椅, Lóngyájiāoyǐ, on his map. In the 15th century, it was known to the Acehnese as Pulau Lada ('Pepper Island'). In 1691, the French general Augustin de Beaulieu recorded going to the island of "Lancahui" (Langkawi) to buy pepper, and de Beaulieu was required to obtain a license from Kedah's heir apparent in Perlis before the penghulu or chief of Langkawi would sell pepper to him.

Langkawi was historically home to Austronesian peoples, such as the Orang Laut, originally from the southern part of the Malay Peninsula and Malay people. It had been thought to be cursed for a couple of centuries. According to local legend, in the late 18th century, a woman named Mahsuri was wrongfully accused of adultery and put to death. Before she died, she placed a curse on the island that would last for seven generations. Not long after Mahsuri's death, in 1821, the Siamese army invaded Kedah and attacked Langkawi. In the first attack, the locals burned down the granary at Padang Matsirat to starve the Siamese army. The Siamese nevertheless captured the island in May 1822, killed its leaders, and took many islanders as slaves, while others fled. Before the Siamese invasion, there was an estimated island population of 3,000–5,000, but only a small proportion was left after the invasion.

The island was recaptured from the Siamese in 1837. In 1840–1841, the Sultan of Kedah, who went into exile after the Siamese attacks, was allowed to return by the Siamese. The Langkawi islands' population recovered afterwards. However, the Orang Laut who fled after the Siamese attacks did not return. In 1909, the islands came under British rule following the Anglo-Siamese Treaty of 1909. The middle of the channel between Tarutao National Park and Langkawi became the Siamese border. During World War II, Siam took control briefly as British Malaya fell to the Japanese.

Langkawi was a haven for pirates who attacked junks in the northern part of the Strait of Malacca. In a series of operations, between December 1945 and March 1946, the British cleared the pirates' land bases on Langkawi and Tarutao. The British continued to rule until Malaya gained its independence in 1957.

Langkawi remained a quiet backwater until 1986, when Prime Minister Mahathir Mohamad transformed it into a major tourist resort, helping to plan many of the islands' buildings himself. Mahsuri's seven-generation curse was said to have been lifted after a seventh generation descendant of Mahsuri was born in the Thai province of Phuket. The island rapidly grew as a tourist destination, and by 2012, it received over three million tourists a year.

== Geography ==
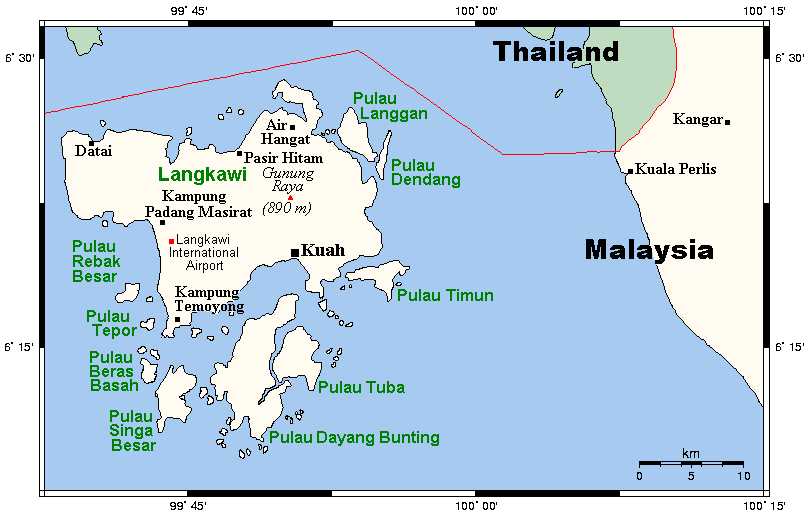
Map of Langkawi

Langkawi, a cluster of 99 islands separated from mainland Malaysia by the Strait of Malacca, is a district of the state of Kedah in northern Malaysia and lies approximately 51 kilometres (32 mi) west of Kedah. The total landmass of the islands is 47,848 hectares (118,230 acres). The main island is about 25 kilometres (16 mi) from north to south and slightly more from east to west. The coastal areas consist of flat, alluvial plains punctuated with limestone ridges. Two-thirds of the island is dominated by forest-covered mountains, hills, and natural vegetation.

The island's oldest geological formation, the Machinchang Formation, was the first part of Southeast Asia to rise from the seabed in the Cambrian over half a billion years ago. The oldest part of the formation is observable at Teluk Datai to the northwest of the island, where the exposed outcrop consists of mainly sandstone (quartzite) in the upper parts and shale and mudstone in the lower parts of the sequence. The best exposure of Cambrian rocks (541 to 485 Ma) in Malaysia is the Machinchang Formation, composed of quartzose clastic rock formations, in Langkawi; the other known example, the Jerai Formation, emerges near the west coast of Kedah on the mainland. Geologically, all these rocks are in the Western Belt of Peninsular Malaysia, which is thought to be part of the Shan–Thai terrane.

== Climate ==
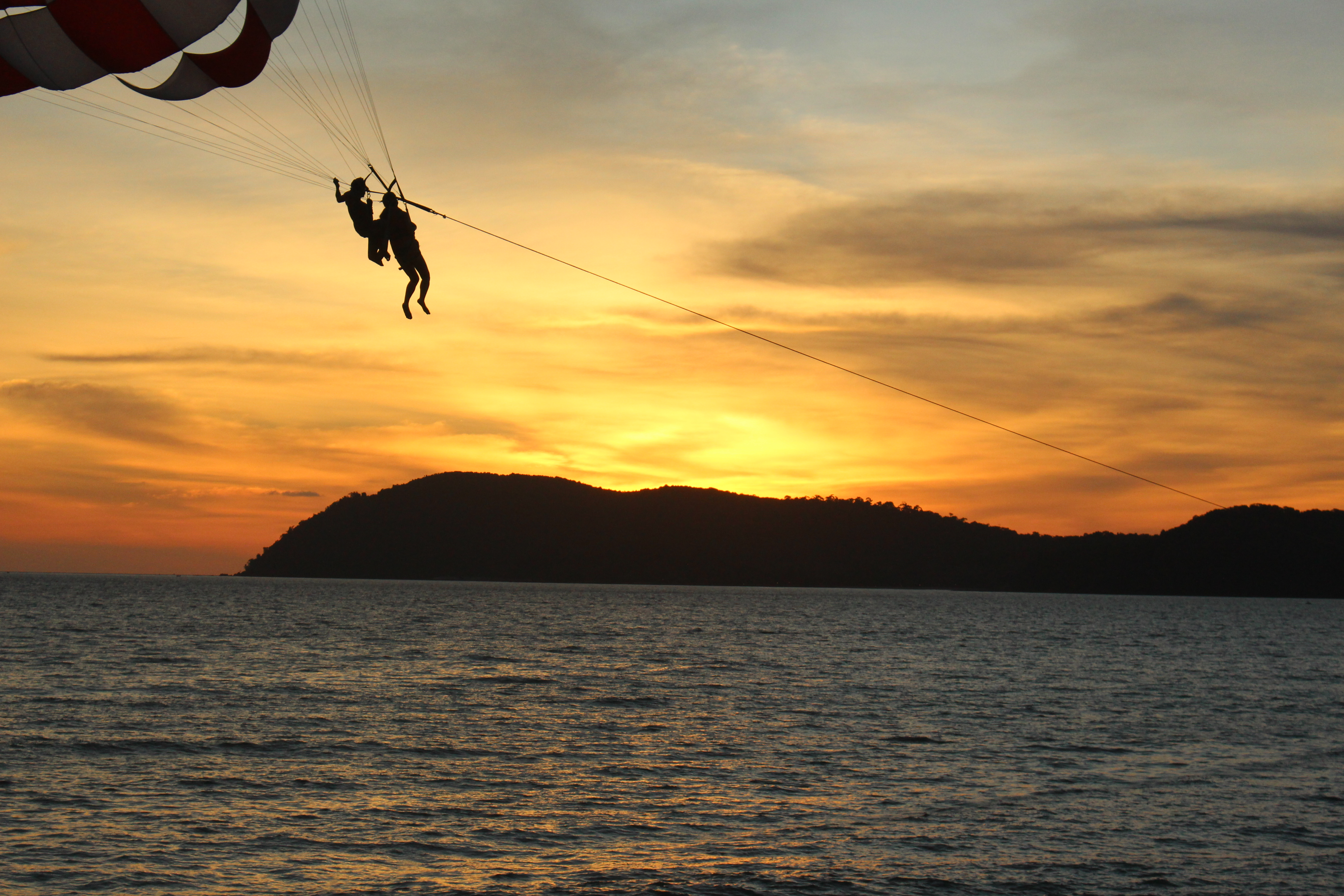
Parasailing at dawn

Langkawi receives more than 2,400 mm (94 in) of rain annually. Langkawi features a tropical monsoon climate (Köppen climate classification Am). Langkawi has a short dry season from December until February. March to November is a long rainy season. September is the wettest month, when it can receive more than 500 mm (20 in).

Climate data for Pulau Langkawi
Month	Jan	Feb	Mar	Apr	May	Jun	Jul	Aug	Sep	Oct	Nov	Dec	Year
Record high °C (°F)	36.2 (97.2)	36.4 (97.5)	37.2 (99.0)	37.1 (98.8)	37.0 (98.6)	35.0 (95.0)	33.8 (92.8)	33.4 (92.1)	33.9 (93.0)	34.8 (94.6)	35.1 (95.2)	34.6 (94.3)	37.2 (99.0)
Mean daily maximum °C (°F)	32.9 (91.2)	33.2 (91.8)	33.0 (91.4)	32.3 (90.1)	31.7 (89.1)	31.5 (88.7)	31.1 (88.0)	30.9 (87.6)	30.6 (87.1)	30.7 (87.3)	31.3 (88.3)	31.6 (88.9)	31.7 (89.1)
Daily mean °C (°F)	28.0 (82.4)	28.2 (82.8)	28.3 (82.9)	28.2 (82.8)	28.1 (82.6)	27.8 (82.0)	27.5 (81.5)	27.4 (81.3)	27.0 (80.6)	26.9 (80.4)	27.3 (81.1)	27.3 (81.1)	27.7 (81.8)
Mean daily minimum °C (°F)	24.4 (75.9)	24.4 (75.9)	24.7 (76.5)	25.0 (77.0)	25.2 (77.4)	24.9 (76.8)	24.6 (76.3)	24.7 (76.5)	24.4 (75.9)	24.3 (75.7)	24.5 (76.1)	24.4 (75.9)	24.6 (76.3)
Record low °C (°F)	19.8 (67.6)	18.0 (64.4)	21.5 (70.7)	21.5 (70.7)	22.7 (72.9)	22.0 (71.6)	21.1 (70.0)	22.0 (71.6)	22.0 (71.6)	21.7 (71.1)	22.1 (71.8)	20.2 (68.4)	18.0 (64.4)
Average precipitation mm (inches)	23.9 (0.94)	32.7 (1.29)	104.8 (4.13)	196.6 (7.74)	206.9 (8.15)	249.9 (9.84)	265.5 (10.45)	319.2 (12.57)	340.6 (13.41)	372.5 (14.67)	193.0 (7.60)	57.5 (2.26)	2,363.1 (93.05)
Average precipitation days	3	5	10	15	18	17	19	19	21	23	16	8	174
Average relative humidity (%)	70	71	76	81	83	84	84	84	85	85	81	75	80
Source: Malaysian Meteorological Department

== Government and politics ==
Tourism City of Langkawi Municipal Council Majlis Perbandaran Langkawi Bandaraya Pelancongan

Type
- Type: Municipal Council of Langkawi

History
- Founded: 24 March 2001

Leadership
- President: Radzuan Bin Osman
- Municipal Secretary: Noorul Azyyati Binti Ahmad Salmi

Meeting place
- Kuah, Langkawi

Website
- pbt.kedah.gov.my/index.php/majlis-perbandaran-langkawi-bandaraya-pelancongan

Langkawi Municipal Council, officially known as the Tourism City of Langkawi Municipal Council (Malay: Majlis Perbandaran Langkawi Bandaraya Pelancongan, MPLBP) and formerly known as the Langkawi District Council (Malay: Majlis Daerah Langkawi) from 29 April 1987 until 23 March 2001, is the local authority of Langkawi.

== Administrative divisions ==
Administration division of Langkawi

Langkawi District is divided into 6 mukims, which are:

- Ayer Hangat
- Bohor
- Kedawang
- Kuah
- Padang Matsirat
- Ulu Melaka

== Demographics ==
Historical population
Year	Pop.	±%
1991	42,938	—
2000	69,681	+62.3%
2010	92,784	+33.2%
2020	94,138	+1.5%

Only four of the 99 islands are inhabited: Langkawi (Pulau Langkawi, the main island), Tuba, Rebak and Dayang Bunting. The population is approximately 99,000, around 65,000 of them in Langkawi, of which 90% are Malays. The other ethnic groups consist mainly of Chinese, Indians, and Thais.

Islam is practised primarily by ethnic Malays. Other major religions are Hinduism (mainly among Indians), Buddhism (mainly among Chinese and Thai), and Christianity (mostly Chinese).

Standard Malay is the official language. English is widely spoken and understood by the locals. Most natives speak a Langkawi variant of Kedah Malay, with minorities also speaking Chinese, Tamil and Siamese.

Ethnic Group	2010	
Ethnic Group	Number	%
Malay	79,146	83.51%
Other Bumiputras	153	0.16%
Chinese	4,325	4.56%
Indian	1,747	1.84%
Others	217	0.23%
Non-Malaysian	9,189	9.70%
Total	94,777	100%

== Federal Parliament and State Assembly Seats ==
Langkawi district representatives in the Federal Parliament of Malaysia

Parliament	Seat Name	Member of Parliament	Party
P4	Langkawi	Mohd Suhaimi Abdullah	Perikatan Nasional (BERSATU)

List of Langkawi district representatives in the Kedah State Legislative Assembly.

Parliament	State	Seat Name	State Assemblyman	Party
P4	N1	Ayer Hangat	Shamsilah Siru	Perikatan Nasional (BERSATU)
P4	N2	Kuah	Amar Pared Mahamud	Perikatan Nasional (BERSATU)

== Tourism ==
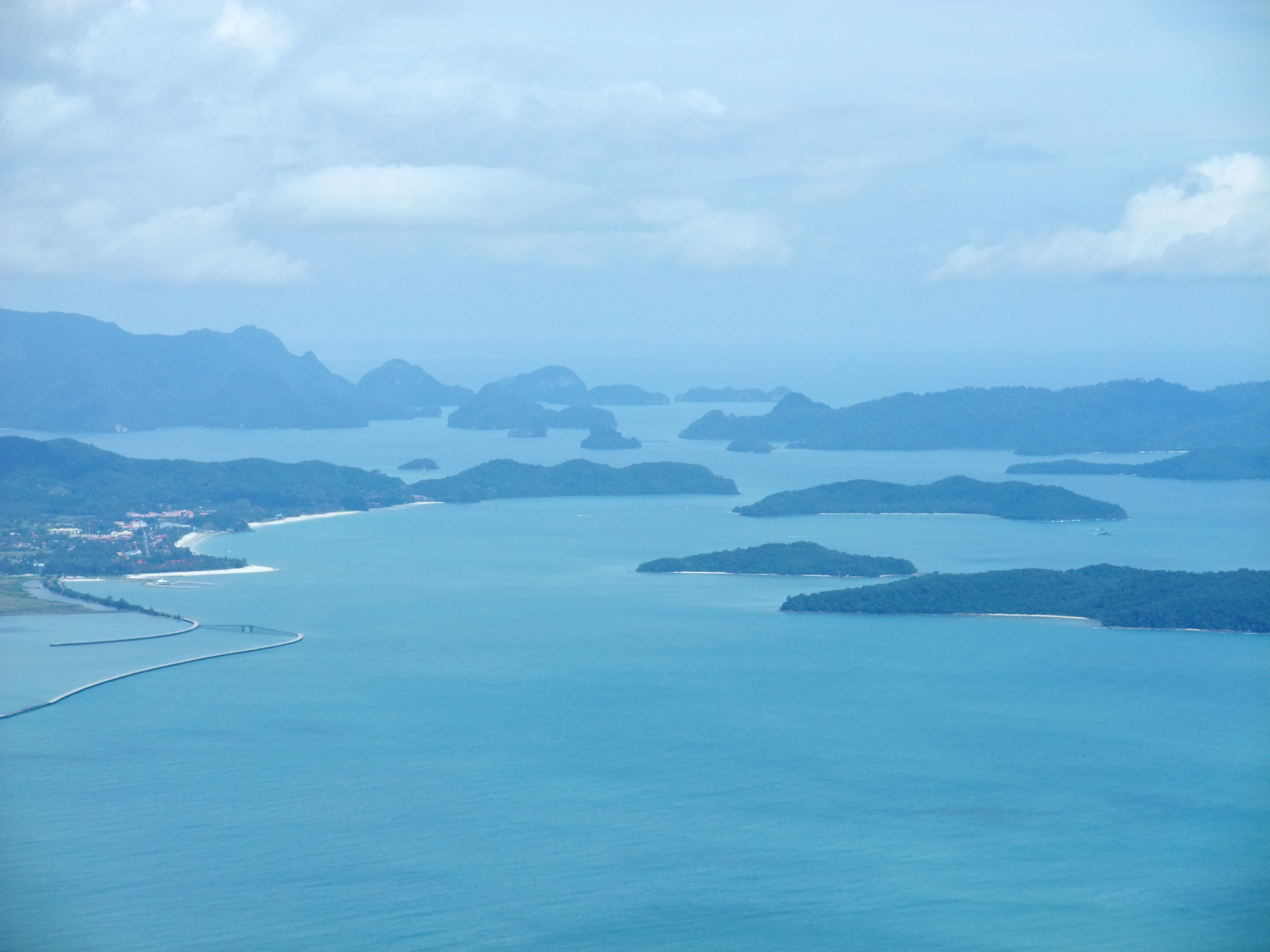
Islands of Langkawi

On 1 June 2007, Langkawi Island was given a World Geopark status by UNESCO. Three of its main conservation areas in Langkawi Geopark are Machincang Cambrian Geoforest Park, Kilim Karst Geoforest Park, and Dayang Bunting Marble Geoforest Park (Island of the Pregnant Maiden Lake). These three parks are the most popular tourism area within Langkawi Geopark. In 2014, UNESCO issued a "yellow card" warning that the park could lose its status as a geopark.

=== Cable car and Sky Bridge ===
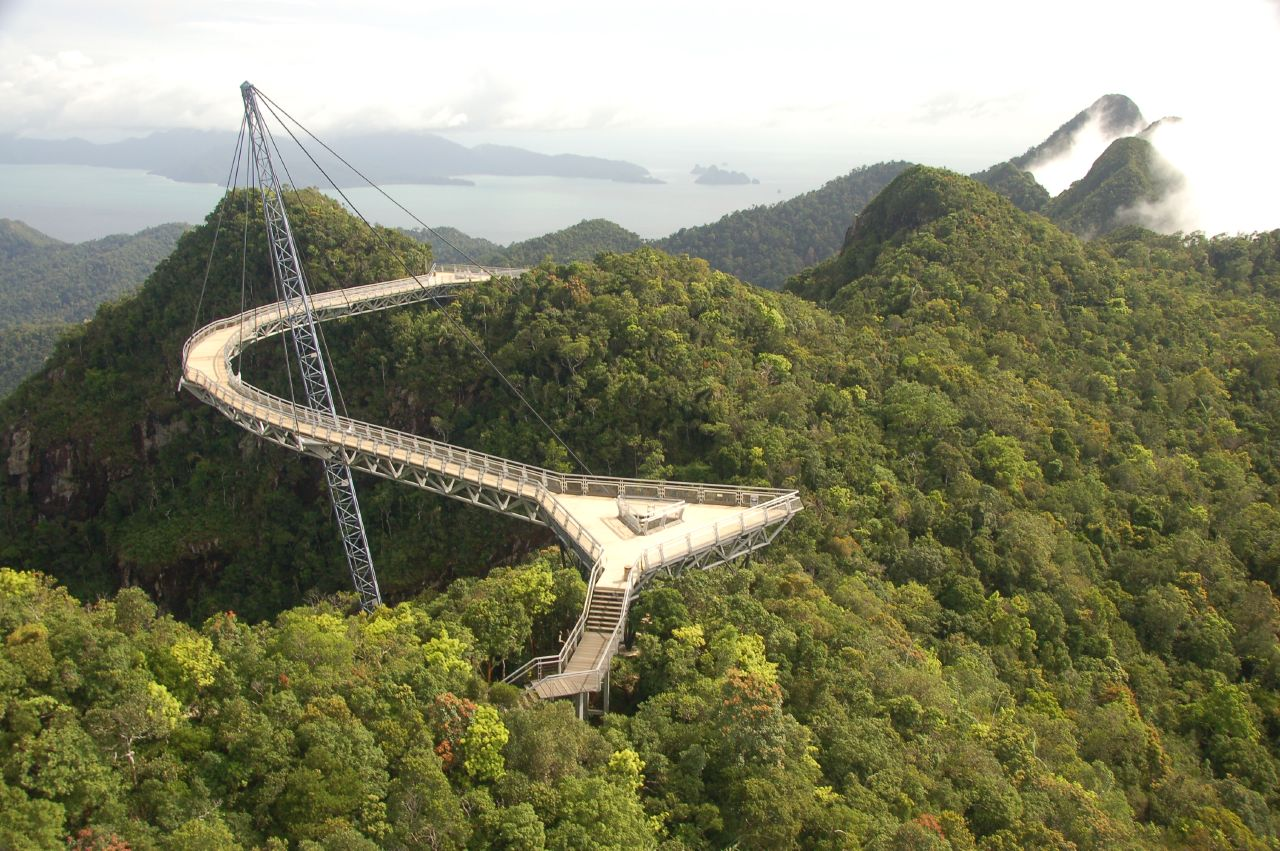
The Langkawi Sky Bridge above the rainforest canopy

The Langkawi Cable Car takes visitors up to the peak of Gunung Mat Chinchang, where the Langkawi Sky Bridge is located. The Sky Bridge was closed in 2012 for maintenance and upgrading but reopened in February 2015. An inclined lift called SkyGlide that would take visitors from the top station to the Sky Bridge was completed in late 2015.

The start of the cable car ride is located in the Oriental Village where there are several attractions, including a 3-Dimensional art museum known as Art in Paradise.

=== Seven Wells Waterfall ===
The Seven Wells Waterfall lies 1.5 kilometres (0.93 mi) north of the Oriental Village and comprises natural rock pools and a 90-metre waterfall.

=== The Kilim Karst Geoforest Park (The Kilim River) ===
The Kilim Karst Geoforest Park is a mangrove forest park which consists of limestone caves and three interconnected river estuaries that stretch approximately 10 km from Kisap village to Tanjung Rhu. Bats, crocodiles, eagles, kingfishers, monitor lizards, macaques, otters, snakes and tree crabs are some of the most commonly found wildlife in the park.

=== MAHA Tower Langkawi ===
MAHA Tower is a tower in Kuah, it is the latest addition, also part of the Langkawi City's project. The tower is approximately 1.40 km from Dataran Lang.

=== Relic of Mahsuri ===
Relic of Mahsuri in Wings by Croske Resort Langkawi at Padang Matsirat, recorded the ancient history and story of Langkawi, is part of the State Government of Kedah's Safe Langkawi project. The hand crafted featured stone wall is 200 meters from Langkawi International Airport .

=== Durian Perangin Waterfall ===
Durian Perangin Waterfall is a cascading waterfall located on the northeastern side of Langkawi Island, Malaysia. It is named after the durian trees that grow in the surrounding rainforest. The waterfall consists of multiple tiers, with natural pools at the base of each cascade.

== Transportation ==
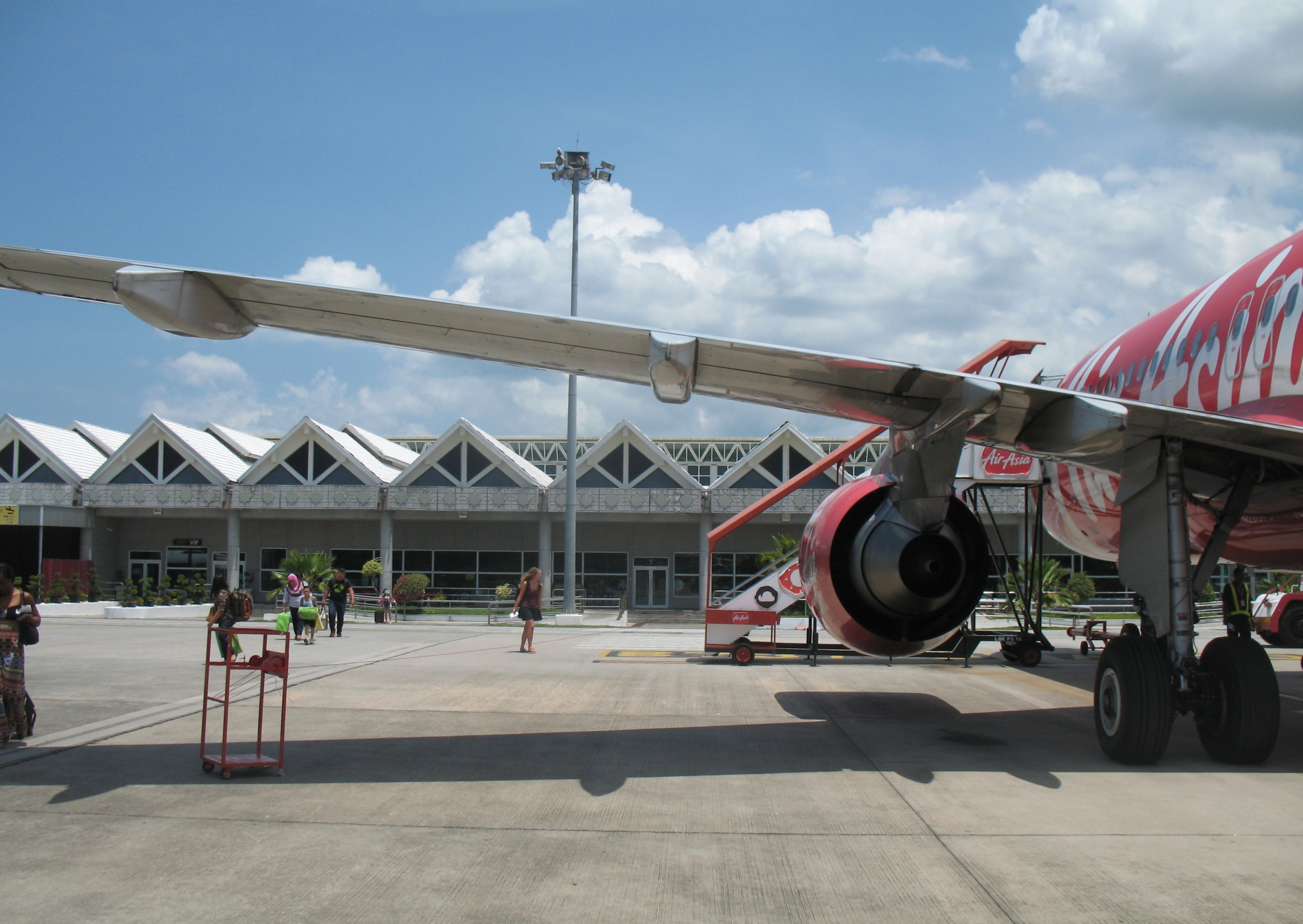
Boarding flight at Langkawi International Airport

The island of Langkawi can be reached by sea and air. The Langkawi Jetty Point connects the island to main destinations like Kuala Perlis, Kuala Kedah and Tamalang. There's also ferry service to Satun town and to Ko Lipe island in Thailand. The ferry between Langkawi and Ko Lipe operates from October until June. The departure/arrival point in Langkawi is at Kuah Jetty, Langkawi and Telaga Harbour, Langkawi. The departure/arrival point in Ko Lipe is at Pattaya Beach. As there is no pier in Ko Lipe, transfers to the beach are done with local long-tail boats. The journey takes about 1 hour and 30 minutes.

Langkawi International Airport is one of seven international airports in Malaysia and connects the island to Kuala Lumpur, Singapore, Penang and Subang.

== Twin towns – Sister cities ==
Langkawi currently has two sister cities:

- Kish Island, Iran.
- Mataram, Indonesia.

== See also ==
- Langkawi International Maritime and Aerospace Exhibition
- Langkawi Island bent-toed gecko

Preceded by Kulim	Capital of Kedah (1800–1864)	Succeeded by Kulim
