= Langkawi Island bent-toed gecko =

Scientific classification
- Kingdom: Animalia
- Phylum: Chordata
- Class: Reptilia
- Order: Squamata
- Suborder: Gekkota
- Family: Gekkonidae
- Genus: Cyrtodactylus
- Species: C. langkawiensis

Binomial name
- Cyrtodactylus langkawiensis Grismer, Wood Jr., Quah, Anuar, Muin, Sumontha, Ahmad, Bauer, Wangkulangkul, Grismer, & Pauwels, 2012

Species of lizard

The Langkawi Island bent-toed gecko (Cyrtodactylus langkawiensis) is a species of gecko that is endemic to Langkawi Island in Malaysia.
