= Flight traffic mapping =

Use of animation to depict flight traffic

All inbound and outbound traffic for Minneapolis/St. Paul (MSP) airport on a weekday at 12:52 PM CDT from Animated Atlas: Flight Traffic over North America Example animations on YouTube

Flight Traffic Mapping uses animation to depict flight traffic. The mapping of flights in real-time is based on a sophisticated air traffic control system that was developed for North America. The air traffic control system is a complex combination of electronics and people that helps guide planes from departure to destination. In 1991, data on the location of aircraft was made available by the Federal Aviation Administration to the airline industry. The National Business Aviation Association (NBAA), the General Aviation Manufacturers Association, the Aircraft Owners and Pilots Association (AOPA), the Helicopter Association International, and the National Air Transportation Association petitioned the FAA to make ASDI information available on a "need-to-know" basis. Subsequently, NBAA advocated the broad-scale dissemination of flight traffic data.

The Aircraft Situational Display to Industry (ASDI) system now conveys up-to-date information on flights to the airline industry and the public. Multiple companies distribute ASDI information including FlightStats, FlightAware, FlightExplorer, FlightView, and FlyteComm. Each company maintains a website that provides free updated information to the public on flight status and flight tracking. FlyteTrax, a product of FlyteComm, is a Windows-based program for displaying the geographic location of airborne IFR (Instrument Flight Rules) air traffic anywhere in the FAA air traffic system. Positions are reported for both commercial and general aviation traffic. The program can overlay air traffic with a wide selection of maps such as, geo-political boundaries, air traffic control center boundaries, high altitude jet routes, satellite cloud and radar imagery.
