= Skyway (disambiguation) =

A skyway is a suspended covered walkway between buildings.

Skyway may also refer to:

== Transport ==
- In air travel, a flight path common to many airline flights
- Minneapolis Skyway System, an interlinked collection of enclosed pedestrian footbridges
- The Jacksonville Skyway in Jacksonville, Florida, a tram (people mover)
- Skyway (Disney) in major Disney theme parks, closed in the 1990s
- Skyway (George Bush Intercontinental Airport)
- Buffalo Skyway
- Burlington Bay James N. Allan Skyway
- Cape Fear Skyway
- Chicago Skyway
- Garden City Skyway
- Metro Manila Skyway
- Pulaski Skyway
- Sunshine Skyway
- San Francisco Skyway
- Veterans' Glass City Skyway
- Skyway, a highway connecting Chico, California and Paradise, California

== Locations ==
- Bryn Mawr-Skyway, Washington, an unincorporated area of King County in western Washington state

== Businesses ==
- Skyways Limited, a post-war British airline which became Skyways International in 1971
- Skyway Airlines based in Wisconsin, US
- Skyway Enterprises, an airline based in Florida, US
- Skyways (Swedish airline), regional airline based in Stockholm, Sweden
- SkyWay Group, а group of companies claiming the invention of a new elevated light rail technology

== Communication ==
- TD-2, a microwave relay system developed by Bell Labs and AT&T, also known as Skyway

== Media ==
- Skyways (TV series), an Australian television series set at an airport
- "Skyway", song by The Replacements from the album Pleased to Meet Me
- Skyway (film), a 1933 American film directed by Lewis D. Collins
- Skyway (album), a 1980 album by Skyy

== See also ==
- Footbridge
- Pedway
- Skybridge (disambiguation)
- Flyway (disambiguation)
- Airway (disambiguation)
