= Flight plan (disambiguation) =

Flight plan is the plan for a flight filed with aviation authorities.

Flight plan may also refer to:

- Flightplan, 2005 thriller film starring Jodie Foster
- Flight planning, planning a flight plan
- Flight-Plan, Japanese video game developer
- Flight Plan (film), a 1950 Australian documentary
- "Flight Plan", a season 2 episode of The Casagrandes

== See also ==
- Flight progress strip
- Flight traffic mapping
- Flightpath (disambiguation)
