= John R. Milton =

American writer

- Born: John Ronald Milton; May 24, 1924; Anoka, Minnesota, U.S.
- Died: January 28, 1995 (aged 70)
- Occupation: Writer; editor
- Education: University of Minnesota (BA, MA); University of Denver (PhD)
- Spouse: Lynn Hinderlie (m. 1946)
- Children: 1

John Ronald Milton (May 24, 1924 – January 28, 1995) was an American writer and editor of the South Dakota Review.

== Life ==
Born on May 24, 1924, in Anoka, Minnesota, John Milton's early years were around Saint Paul. In the Second World War from 1943 to 1946, John served in the Army Signal Corps. On August 3, 1946, Milton married Lynn Hinderlie. Together they had one daughter.

He returned to the Twin Cities and in 1948 earned a Bachelor of Arts degree from the University of Minnesota. Milton returned to the University of Minnesota for a master of arts degree, graduating in 1951. From 1949 to 1956, Milton taught at Augsburg College in Minneapolis. Until 1962, he taught English at Jamestown College in North Dakota, chairing the English department. During this time, he was a Ph.D. student at the University of Denver for American literature and creative writing. Milton completed his doctoral studies in 1961.

In 1963, the University of South Dakota hired Milton as a professor of English. He taught at USD for the remainder of his career, until his death.

John R. Milton died on January 28, 1995, of a heart attack.

== Career ==
At the University of South Dakota, John Milton founded and edited the South Dakota Review, a literary magazine that earned national recognition. Milton wrote more than 200 publications and reviews. After South Dakota Governor Mickelson's 1993 death in a plane crash, John Milton earned accolades for his reading of “The Legacy” at the memorial's dedication ceremony.

The "John R. Milton Writers' Conference", a biennial conference, is named for him. Milton's papers are held at the University of South Dakota.

=== Awards ===
- 1969 “Best American Short Story” for “The Inheritance of Emmy One Horse”

=== Writing ===
- "The Ethics of Gratitude"
- This Lonely House, Minneapolis, MN: J. D. Thueson, 1968
- The tree of bones, and other poems, Dakota Press, 1973
- The Literature of South Dakota, Vermillion, SD: Dakota Press, 1976 ISBN 978-0-88249-023-6
- The Novel of the American West, Lincoln: University of Nebraska Press, 1980. ISBN 978-0-8032-0980-0
- South Dakota: A Bicentennial History. Norton. 1977. ISBN 978-0-393-05627-3. (reprint W. W. Norton & Company, 1989, ISBN 978-0-393-30571-5)

=== Editing ===
- John R. Milton, ed. (1969). The American Indian speaks. Dakota Press.
- John R. Milton, ed. (1974). Four Indian poets. Dakota Press. ISBN 978-0-88249-015-1.
