= Airbridge =

Airbridge or air bridge may refer to:

- AirBridge (alliance) or AiRUnion, a defunct Russian-backed consortium
- Airbridge (band), an early-1980s British progressive-rock band
- Airbridge (logistics), the route and means of delivering material from one place to another by an airlift
- Airbridge (ultralight aircraft manufacturer), a Russian manufacturer of ultralights
- Jet bridge or airbridge, a passenger boarding bridge used at large airports
- An electronic component used to allow two traces to cross in, for instance, planar transmission line circuits
- Air Bridge, 1951 thriller novel by Hammond Innes

== See also ==
- AirBridgeCargo Airlines, LLC, a subsidiary of Volga-Dnepr Airlines based in Moscow, Russia
- Oriental Air Bridge Co., Ltd., a Japanese charter airline based at Nagasaki Airport
- Skybridge (disambiguation), a covered bridge between two buildings
