= Seven Wells Waterfall =

Air Terjun Telaga Tujuh
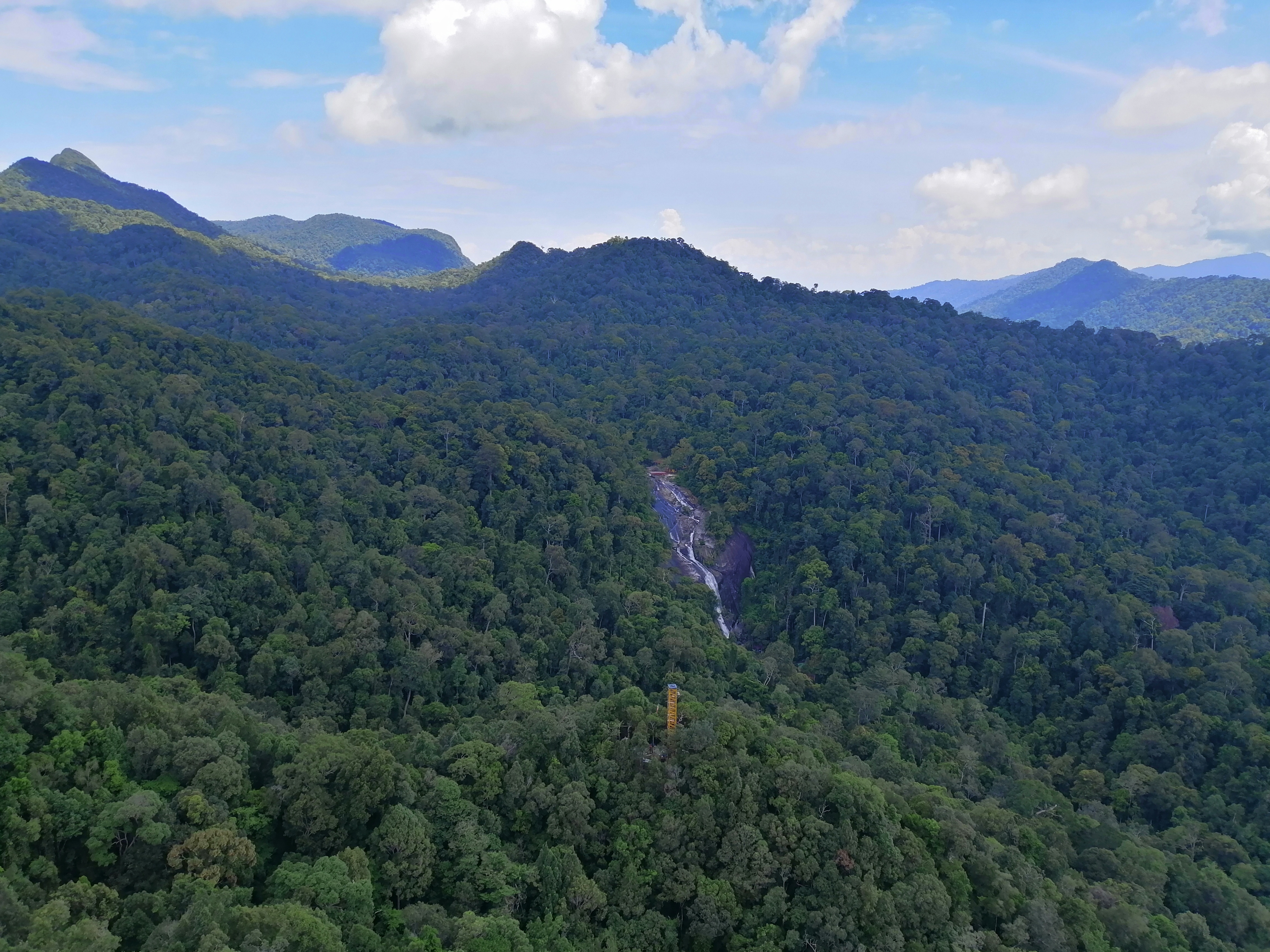
- Air Terjun Telaga Tujuh
- Interactive map of Air Terjun Telaga Tujuh
- Location: Langkawi, Kedah, Malaysia
- Coordinates: 6°22′40″N 99°40′26″E

The Seven Wells Waterfall (Malaysian: Air Terjun Telaga Tujuh) is a series of waterfalls originating from seven springs, flowing into seven natural wells. The flow from the first well forms a small river and passes through to the other wells. It is located on the cliffs of Mount Mat Chinchang facing Burau Bay. The waterfall can be climbed via 900 steep steps to the first part of the waterfall. It can take between 45 minutes and an hour to climb to the top of the 90-meter-high waterfall.

The waterfall flows from one pool to another and forms a cascade on the face of the hill, from which it gets its name. The fast flow of water makes the surrounding rocks slippery as the water flows from one pool to the other until the seventh pool at the foot of the hill 90 meters below. This waterfall is said to be so beautiful that it is a place where fairies bathe and can also cure diseases.

There is a Cratoxylum lime tree found in the waterfall area which is said to be left by the fairies. Cratoxylum lime is usually used in Malay medicine to ward off bad luck by taking a sintuk bath.

The Seven Wells Waterfall can be reached by car, motorcycle or taxi; after passing Pantai Kok, turn right, opposite Burau Bay Resort until you reach the parking lot. There are souvenir stalls at the foot of the hill. The climb to the top of the waterfall takes about 45 minutes, and visitors can enjoy the beautiful natural scenery of the equatorial rainforest along the way. There are wild animals such as monkeys and squirrels, as well as hornbills perched on tree branches.

Visitors are advised to follow the instructions given, those who did not follow safety instructions have been injured or killed in the past. This happened when visitors crossed the rope barrier to get closer to the waterfall and slipped due to slippery rocks.

== Legend ==
According to local stories, it is believed that there are seven princesses from heaven who often bathe and love the cool water of this well. There was a prince who lived near this well and tried to woo and marry one of these princesses but was unsuccessful. The water is also believed to have the power to cure several diseases.

Close to the Seven Wells Waterfall are Berjaya Langkawi and Mutiara Burau Bay Resort. Both have beaches in front.
