= Airway (automobile) =

American microcar with two seats

- Industry: Automobile
- Founded: 1949
- Defunct: 1950
- Headquarters: San Diego, California, United States
- Key people: Everett Miller; T. P. Hall
- Products: automobiles

The Airway was an American microcar with two seats, made by Everett Miller and T. P. Hall, and Clarence O Lee was a loaned engineer between 1949 and 1950 in San Diego, California. It had an all-aluminum body and chassis and an air-cooled 10 hp (7 kW) Onan engine mounted at the back. Normally it would only use a single fluid-drive speed, plus an emergency low gear.

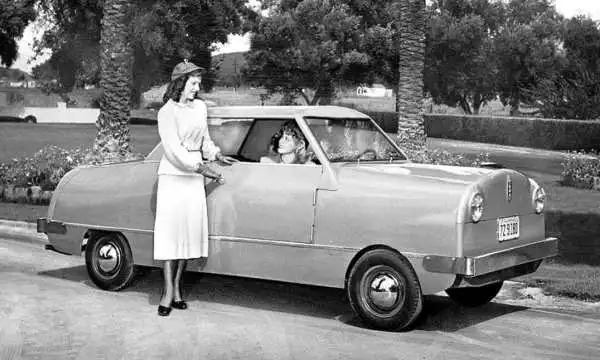
1949 Airway Sedan

== History ==
Hall had attempted several times to make a flying car, but stuck with a more conventional design for this car. The streamlined styling was considered to be modern and quite appealing, and its tiny wheels made the car look larger than it actually was. It used a large amount of aluminum and plastic to reduce its weight. Its wheelbase was 100 inches (2,540 mm) in length (158 inches (4,010 mm) all told) and 50 inches (1,270 mm) wide. Only two are known to have been made, one of the coupe and one of the sedan, though a number of photographs exist.

== Model details ==
| Body Type | Shipping weight | Factory price |
|---|---|---|
| 2-door Sedan | 800 lb (360 kg) | US$750 |
| 2-door Coupe | 775 lb (352 kg) | US$750 |
