= Flightpath (marketing agency) =

New York-based digital creative agency

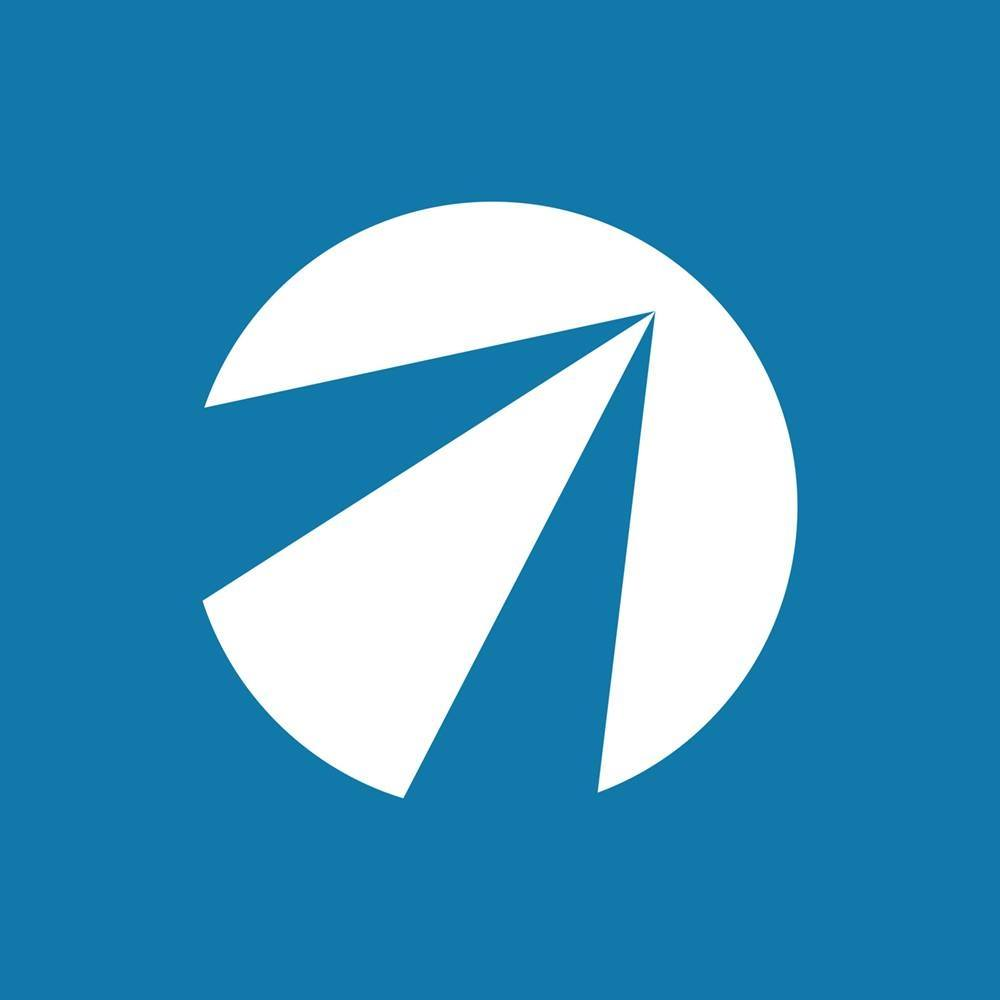
- Company type: Privately owned
- Headquarters: New York, New York
- Area served: Worldwide
- Website: www.flightpath.com

Flightpath is a New York-based digital creative agency. Founded in 1994, Flightpath has worked with clients such as Goya Foods, Sherwin-Williams, Showtime, BMW and Newsday.

Flightpath has taken home honors from the Interactive Media Awards, iMedia Awards, W3 Awards and the WebAwards for their client work.

== History ==
Flightpath was founded in 1994 by Jon Fox as X Communications, NYC Inc. in the early era of internet service and technology. The company focused primarily on website production for clients.

In 2000, the company was renamed Xworld, and creative director Steven Louie joined the company as principal. Xworld was a website production agency from 2000 to 2007, when it transitioned to a full service digital agency under the name Flightpath. Flightpath offices are located in the Flatiron District of NYC.
