= FlightPath =

Academic advising software

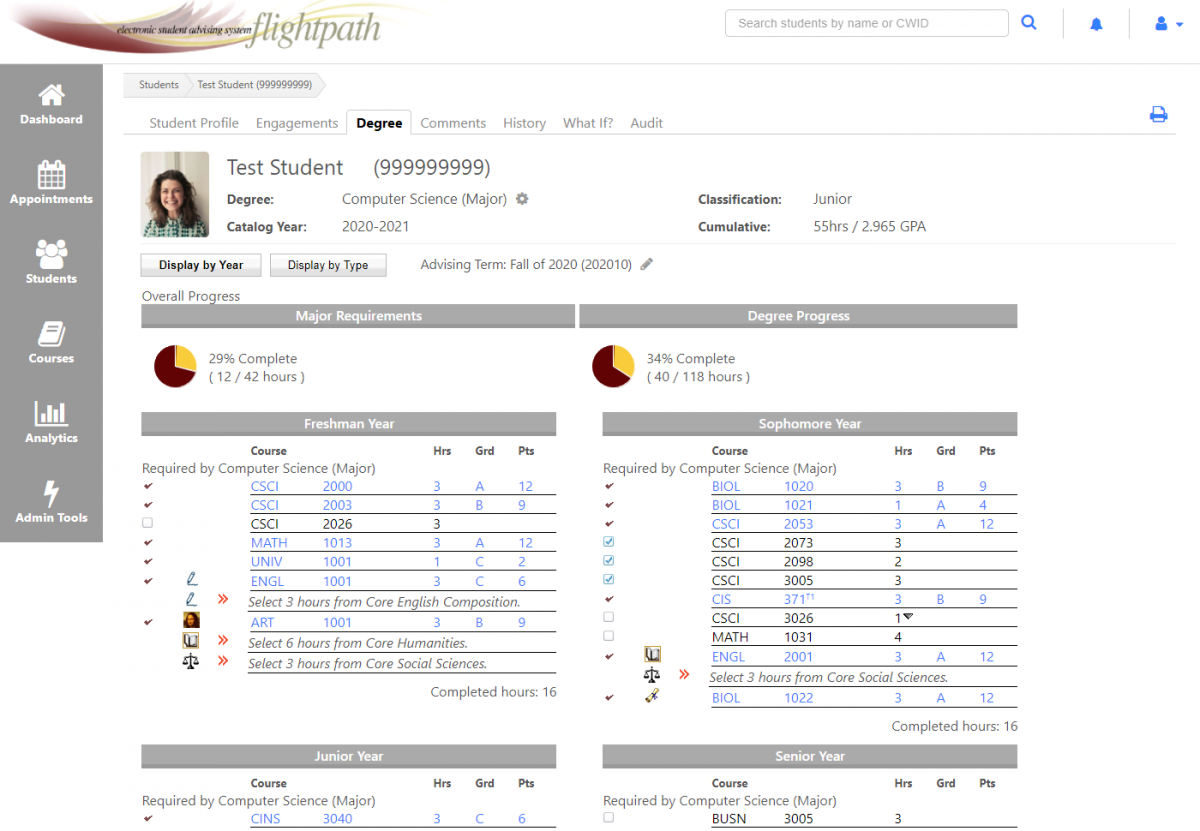
- FlightPath, Open Source Advising & Student Success
- Written in: PHP
- Operating system: Cross-platform
- Type: Academic advising system
- License: GPLv3+
- Website: getflightpath.com

FlightPath is an open-source, web-based enterprise software application for academic advising, degree audit, and student success for institutions of higher education. Originally created at a large public university in Louisiana, The University of Louisiana at Monroe, the software package was released as open-source software on March 13, 2013.

FlightPath provides comprehensive and persistent academic advising to support student success in institutions of higher learning; all history of academic support can be accessed through any web browser. Students receive documented guidance to take courses that progress towards graduation. Advisors and support staff can monitor progress and provide comments for advisees and campus staff. Students and advisors may also try out how accumulated course credits can lead to completion of other degrees using the "What If?" tool. FlightPath has been in continuous use by universities, community colleges, and secondary schools around the world since its release as open-source. It is actively maintained and is currently at version 7.

== Background ==
=== Origins ===
FlightPath was created by The University of Louisiana at Monroe's Student Success Center, after searching for a commercial solution to online academic advising and retention services, but was unable to find a software package that was both affordable and customizable for specific functionality. FlightPath was operational in fall of 2006 but lacked the framework necessary for integrating contributions from the open source community. By 2012, FlightPath's core code was modified to include framework features of Drupal, and other popular open-source packages, making it suitable for adoption by other universities as an open source solution.

== Features ==
FlightPath's core features provide extensive solutions for academic advising including equivalent/substitution/transfer courses with degree audit. All types of degree program curriculums (prerequisites, minimum grades, elective courses, etc.) are supported and separated by catalog year. The system also provides reports, automated early warning alerts for students, and various other related features which may be integrated with FlightPath as additional modules.

Some of the core features are as follows:

- View student's transcript, degree plan, grades, progress towards graduation
- Perform substitutions and exceptions
- View transfer credit equivalencies
- View course descriptions
- Search complete set of degree plans available by catalog year
- Appointment scheduling - Advising appointment scheduling (face-to-face or via Zoom)
- Comments/Notes - In addition to advising sessions, advisors may leave notes and comments
- At-Risk Assessment - Using basic AI, FlightPath can determine how "at-risk" a student is of falling behind or dropping out
- Complete advising history
- Designed to support customization by administrators
- Compatible with all modern web browsers

== Add-on Modules ==
FlightPath's functionality is extensible through the use of add-on modules. Below are a handful of examples:

- Banner Integration - Import student and course data from the Banner student information system by Ellucian
- Locale - Translates FlightPath's static text into other languages
- SSO/LDAP - User authentication handled through an LDAP server or OAuth single-sign-on server.
- SMS text messaging - Communicate with students directly by SMS text messages (send and receive)
- Zoom meetings - Appointments may be scheduled to directly connect via Zoom on both ends.
- Attendance tracking for seminars and events
- Surveys and polls

== Deployment and Installation ==
FlightPath can be either self-hosted on campus, or as a hosted, managed platform via FlightPath Academics. When self-hosting, a LAMP stack is recommended.

=== Server Requirements ===
FlightPath uses industry-standard web server hardware and software:

- MySQL/MariaDB
- Apache
- PHP version 7 or higher
- Linux, Unix, or Windows
- Minimum of 2GB of RAM and 10GB hard disk space
