= Flyway (magazine) =

American literary magazine

Flyway is an American literary magazine founded by Stephen Pett in 1995. It is based at Iowa State University in Ames, Iowa. Genre editors included Sheryl St. Germain, Debra Marquart, Andie Dominick, Sam Pritchard, and Gary Whitehead. Flyway became Flyway: Journal of Writing and Environment 2009, in concert with the creation of Iowa State University's MFA Program in Creative Writing and Environment. Students from the program serve as genre editors and readers. Flyway publishes fiction, essays and poetry with environmental themes. From its beginnings, Sheryl Kamps has provided technical support. Pieces that have appeared in Flyway have been selected for inclusion in the Best American anthologies and shortlisted for the Pushcart Prize. In 2012, in part because of the economic pressures of print, and in part because the staff was excited by the dynamic possibilities of a digital form, Flyway suspended its print issues and moved entirely online.

== Notable contributors ==
- Christine D. Allen-Yazzie
- Jacob M. Appel
- Madison Smartt Bell
- Stephen Dixon
- Mylène Dressler
- Philip Heldrich
- Ray A. Young Bear
- Dan O'Brien
- Sandra Kohler
- George Looney
- Laurel Nakadate
- Michael Martone
- Jane Smiley
- Todd Davis
- Joseph Geha
- Rick Bass
- Amy Fleury
- Christina Eisenberg
- Virgil Suarez
- Ted Kooser

== See also ==
- List of literary magazines
