= Aircraft Situation Display to Industry =

The Aircraft Situation Display to Industry (or ASDI) data stream is a service made available through the U.S. Department of Transportation's Volpe Transportation Center. In 1991, data on the location of aircraft was made available by the Federal Aviation Administration to the airline industry. The ASDI stream consists of data elements which show the position and flight plans of all aircraft in U.S. and optionally, UK airspace. Elements include the location, altitude, airspeed, destination, estimated time of arrival and tail number or designated identifier of air carrier and general aviation aircraft operating on IFR flight plans within U.S. airspace. Aircraft owners and operators may request limited dissemination of such data, after which a particular aircraft is deemed "ASDI-blocked", however weak encryption of ACARS data means that in practice aircraft operational data can still be captured and decoded using simple equipment.

A preceding system, the Semi-Automatic Ground Environment (SAGE) air defense network, utilized flight plans matched to radar returns, continuously and automatically, to aid in identifying aircraft. Computer programs recorded the number of times an aircraft deviated from its assigned course and notified appropriate personnel each time a deviation occurred. IBM and MITRE Corporation were the developers of the SAGE system. Much of MITRE's subsequent air traffic control collaboration with the FAA was based on SAGE system developments.
