= Philip Heldrich =

American poet

Philip Heldrich was an American author of poetry, essays, short stories, and literary criticism, including Good Friday, winner of the Poetry Prize, X.J. Kennedy and Out Here in the Out There: Essays in a Region of Superlatives, winner of the Mid-List Press First Series Award for Creative Nonfiction.

His work appeared widely in anthologies—such as American Nature Writing 2001 edited by John A. Murray (Oregon State University Press) and Texas Bound Book III: 22 Texas Stories edited by Kay Cattarulla (Texas A&M University Press)--and literary journals including North American Review, Florida Review (Winner of the Editor's Prize for Nonfiction), Journal of Writing and Environment, Flyway, Ascent, Seattle Review, Connecticut Review, Louisiana Literature, South Dakota Review, and more. His literary criticism and reviews have appeared in Studies in Short Fiction, The Southern Quarterly, Great Plains Quarterly, Midwest Quarterly, American Indian Culture and Research Journal and others.

About Good Friday, author Jonathan Holden remarked:

"In his magnificent poem 'Momentum,' as throughout Good Friday, the poet Philip Heldrich, like the late W. C. Williams, demonstrates audaciously how, while 'pulled and tugged in the swirl of rush hour traffic,' we can, out of the American quotidian, locate and frame that which is beautiful."

Final Judge X.J. Kennedy added:

"Philip Heldrich writes shapely poems that go places and share some wisdom with us. ... He can capture a good deal of territory in a limited number of well-crafted words."

About his award-winning collection of essays, Out Here in the Out There: Essays in a Region of Superlatives, the American Library Associations's Booklist noted:

"Poet and pop culture aficionado Heldrich searches for the lyrical within his small midwestern meatpacking town and beyond. For Heldrich, lover of words, there is beauty to be found at the local dump: magazines (Kansas Farmer), discarded beverage bottles ("Golden Sound Basil Seed Drink"), even machine names (the "cram-a-lot" baler is a favorite). The resulting essays are a happy melding of social commentary with the best sort of travel writing. A finely crafted ode to target practice and male bonding set in a high country meadow in Colorado quietly evolves into a memorial for a lost friend. Another piece perfectly captures the surreal nature of the academic conference, made even more dreamlike by taking place in Norman, Oklahoma, five hours before a championship football game. (Heldrich succumbs to Husker and Sooner mania.) Driving around "out there," whether it be Disneyland or the Central Plains, the author puts pen to paper, accurately capturing the essence of American culture."

Philip Heldrich served as executive director of the Popular and American Culture Associations. He was an associate professor in the Interdisciplinary Arts & Sciences Program at the University of Washington Tacoma.

== Cancer and death ==
Heldrich was diagnosed with cancer in early 2009. He underwent chemotherapy treatment and continued to teach courses in writing fiction, creative nonfiction and poetry. He died on November 11, 2010, due to complications from his illness.
