= Skywalk (disambiguation) =

A skywalk is a type of pedestrian bridge

Skywalk may also refer to:

- SkyWalk, a covered walkway in Toronto, Canada
- Skywalk (album), a 1984 album by jazz organist Jimmy McGriff
- Skywalk (band), a Canadian jazz fusion band
- Skywalk GmbH & Co. KG, a German aircraft manufacturer
- Skywalk (Jackerath), a viewing point at the Garzweiler open-pit lignite mine, Germany
- Skywalk Observatory, an observation deck in Boston, United States
- Grand Canyon Skywalk, a glass-bottomed bridge in Arizona, United States
- Minneapolis Skyway System, an interlinked collection of enclosed pedestrian footbridges
- Sydney Tower Skywalk, an observation deck in Sydney, Australia
- Skywalking, a form of tightrope walking
