= Langkawi Sky Bridge =

Curved cable-stayed pedestrian bridge in Malaysia

Langkawi Sky Bridge Jambatan Udara Langkawi
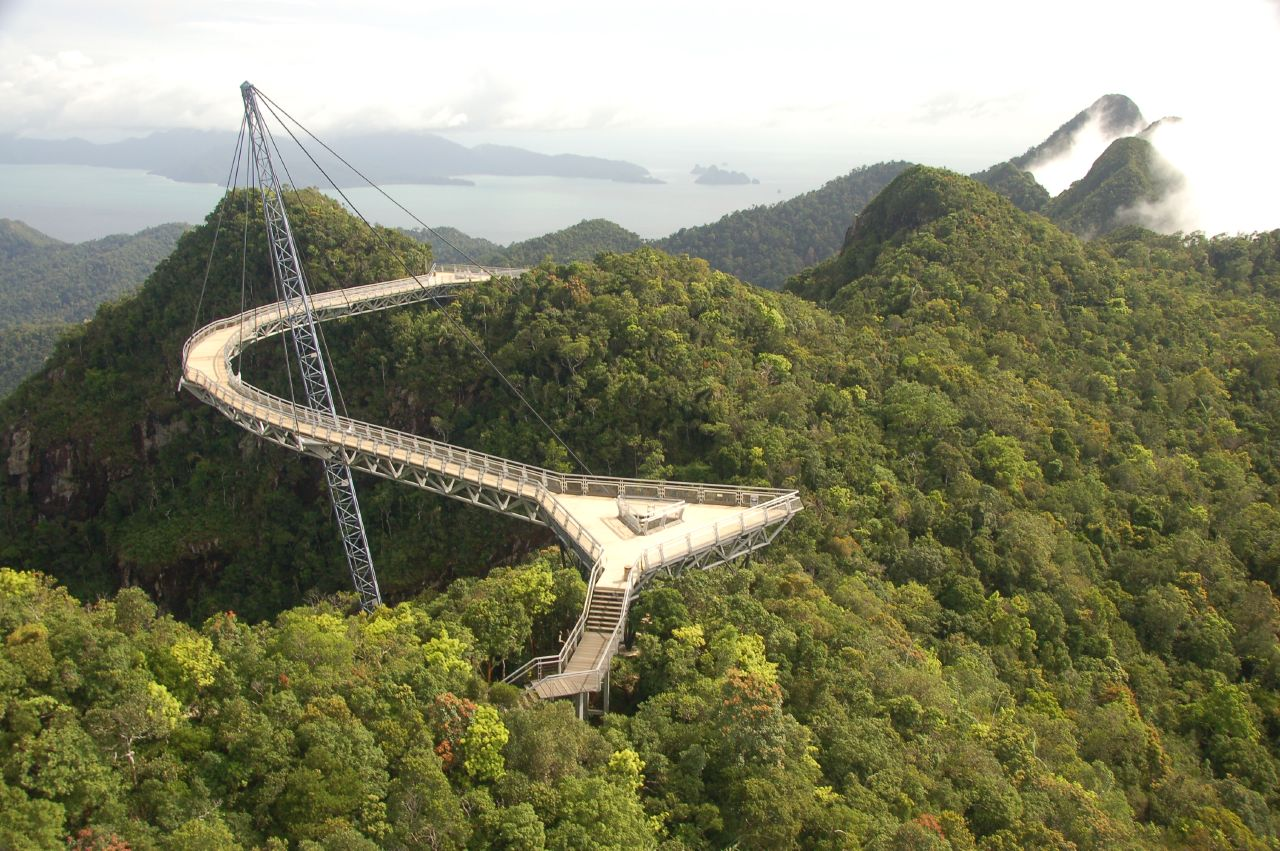
- Langkawi sky bridge in 2007
- Coordinates: 6°23′11″N 99°39′45″E
- Carries: Pedestrian
- Crosses: Gunung Mat Chinchang
- Locale: Langkawi
- Official name: Langkawi Sky Bridge
- Maintained by: Langkawi Development Authority (LADA)

Characteristics
- Design: curved pedestrian cable-stayed bridge
- Total length: 125 m (410 ft)

History
- Designer: Peter Wyss
- Engineering design by: CEPAS Plan; Angkasa Jurutera Perunding
- Constructed by: Alam Langkawi; B&O Construction; BBR Construction Systems (M)
- Opened: 27 February 2005; 21 years ago

Location
- Interactive map of Langkawi Sky Bridge

Langkawi Sky Bridge is a 125-metre (410 ft) curved pedestrian cable-stayed bridge in Malaysia, completed in 2005. The bridge deck is 660 metres (2,170 ft) above sea level at the peak of Gunung Mat Cincang on Pulau Langkawi, the main island of the Langkawi archipelago in Kedah. The Langkawi Sky Bridge can be reached by first taking the Langkawi Cable Car to the Top Station, where an inclined lift called SkyGlide takes visitors from the Top Station down to the bridge.

The bridge was closed in July 2012 for maintenance and upgrading. The reopening was put off several times, but it partially reopened in February 2015. The bridge is now fully accessible.

== Design and construction ==
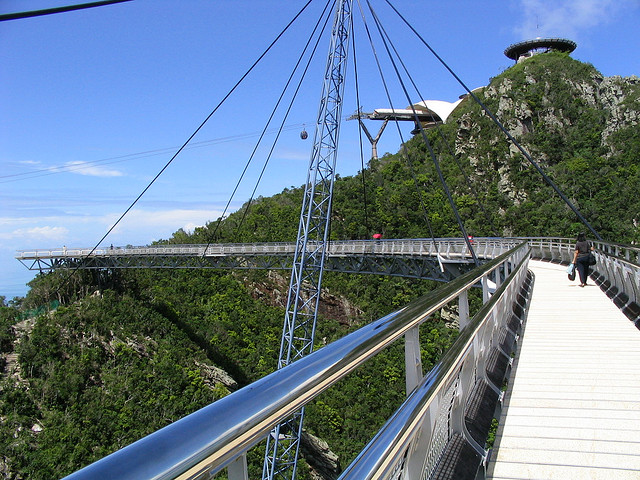
A view of the curved bridge, with the Langkawi Cable Car's Top Station in background

=== Design and layout ===
The curved cable-stayed bridge is 125 meters (410 ft) long and nominally 1.8 meters (5.9 ft) wide, in five 25 m (82 ft) sections: a wider curved central section connected on each end symmetrically to a curved section followed by a straight section. It has steel railings as well as steel wire meshes on both sides of the bridge. It was designed by Peter Wyss as a curved walkway to maximise the viewing experience, providing shifting perspective as a visitor walks along the bridge. The walkway, formed of steel and concrete panels set on top of an inverted triangular truss, connects two hilltops at Gunung Mat Chinchang. The first 25 m (82 ft) of the bridge is straight, followed by three curved 25 m (82 ft) sections, then a final straight 25 m (82 ft) section. At each end of the walkway, the bridge has a 3.6m-wide triangular viewing platform that serves as resting and viewing areas for visitors.

The curved bridge deck is suspended by four pairs of front-stay cables, connected to outrigger hanging points located at the ends of the three curved 25 m (82 ft) sections, in a semi-fan array from the top of an 81.5 m (267 ft) high single pylon. The curved bridge deck hangs with its center of gravity directly below its point of suspension at the pylon head and with the top of the deck at an elevation 660 m (2,170 ft) above sea level. The pylon is anchored onto a concreted pad set at an elevation of 604.5 m (1,983 ft), and its tip reached 686 m (2,251 ft) above sea level. It is tilted from the vertical, at angles of 12° and 2° in two planes, and stabilized by two main back-stay cables, anchored into opposite hillsides. The two ends of the curved bridge deck are connected to two triangular viewing platforms on opposite hilltops. The bridge is designed to carry a up to 250 people.

=== Construction ===
The bridge was pre-fabricated in segments and lifted to the top of the mountain using Russian Kamov helicopters. The entire bridge was then assembled in its current position beside the pylon. Helicopters were also used in the erection of the two triangular end platforms, the pylon, and the initial central segment of the deck. Because of instability in the deck segment, the remaining deck segments, of which there were fourteen, were assembled using more conventional working cable and winch system, with a winch at each end platform and the working cable strung to the pylon. The bridge roughly cost $1.2 million to construct. The bridge was constructed in 12 months between August 2003 and August 2004. It was opened to the public in February 2005.

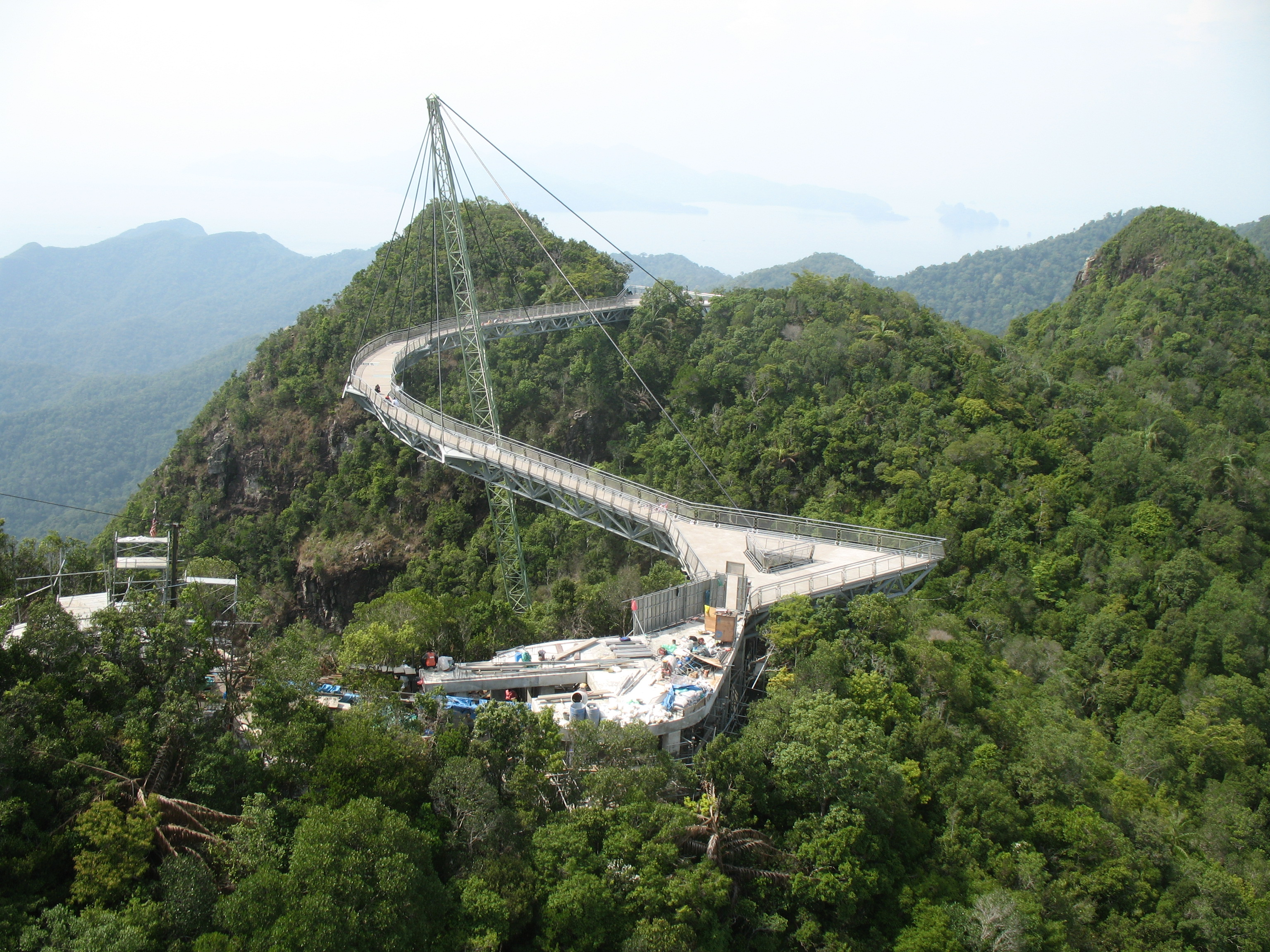
A new platform being built in 2015 connecting SkyGlide with the bridge

=== 2012 upgrade ===
In July 2012, the bridge was closed for maintenance, upgrading and structural strengthening. The whole structure would be of stainless steel, and when it is finished, it would have sections of glass walkway in the wider central curved section so that visitors may look down the valley from where they stand, and an inclined elevator or lift called SkyGlide that brings visitors from the top station down to the bridge.

The bridge reopened in February 2015, although access was for a time still limited as the SkyGlide was not finished until December 2015.

== SkyGlide ==
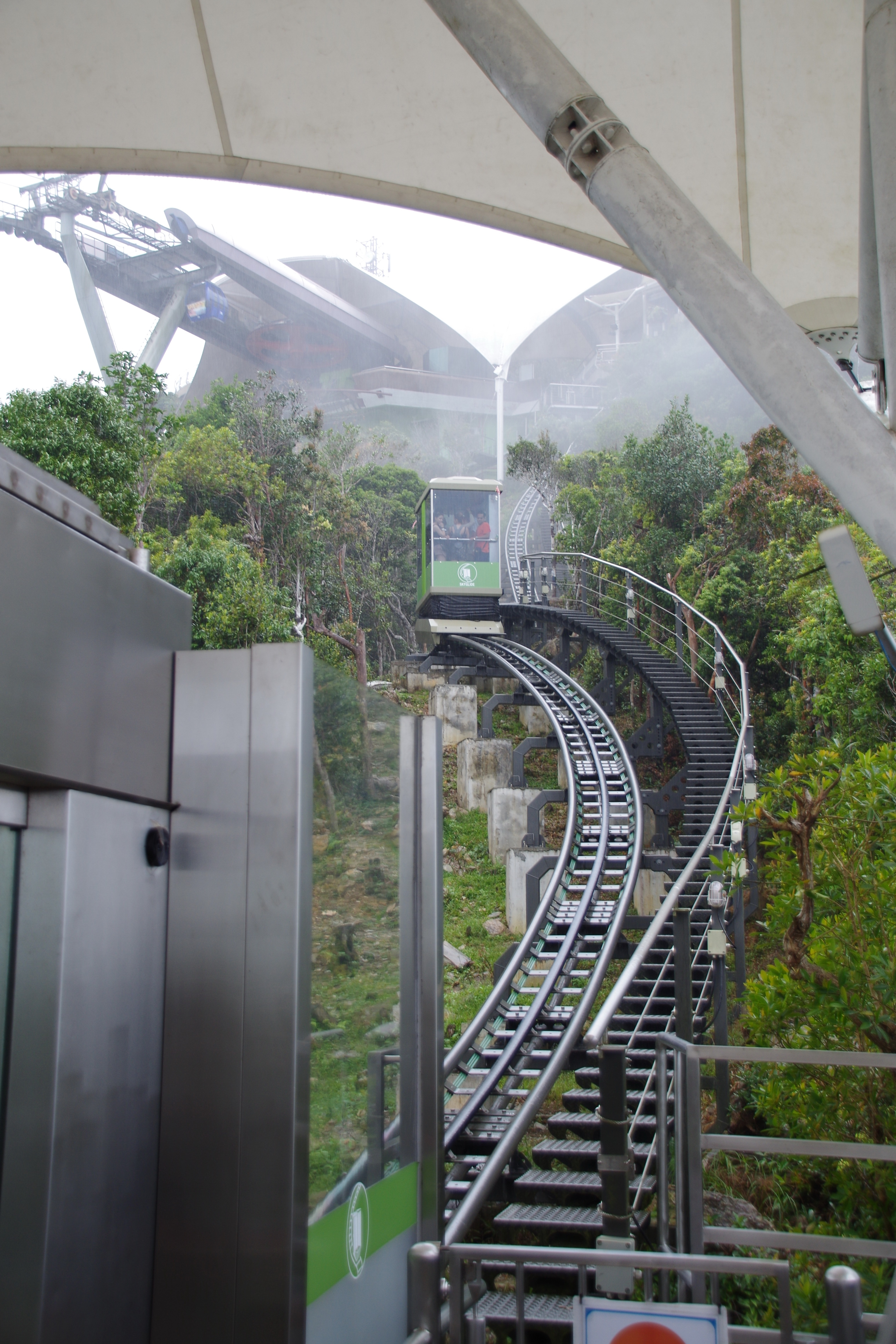
SkyGlide

An inclinator called SkyGlide and a new platform were built linking the Langkawi Cable Car's Top Station and the Sky Bridge, taking passengers down to the Sky Bridge. It opened in December 2015. The SkyGlide cabin can accommodate 12 passengers or 1,050 kg (2,310 lb) load per trip, and the ride lasts about two minutes. The ticket for the SkyGlide is sold separately at the Top Station.

A cheaper alternative to the SkyGlide is for visitors to walk 10–20 minutes along a steep and less secure mountain track between the Top Station and the Sky Bridge.

== Popular media ==
The last scene of the 2006 Indian movie Don: The Chase Begins Again was filmed here. The 2007 Tamil movie Billa starring Ajith Kumar was also filmed here.

== Technical information ==
- Overall length of curved walkway: 125 m (410 ft)
- Area of the bridge: 500 square meters (5,400 sq ft)
- Pylon height: 82 m (269 ft)
- Pylon foundation: 605 m (1,985 ft) above sea level
- Top of pylon: 687 m (2,254 ft) above sea level
- Maximum capacity: 250 people.

== Gallery ==
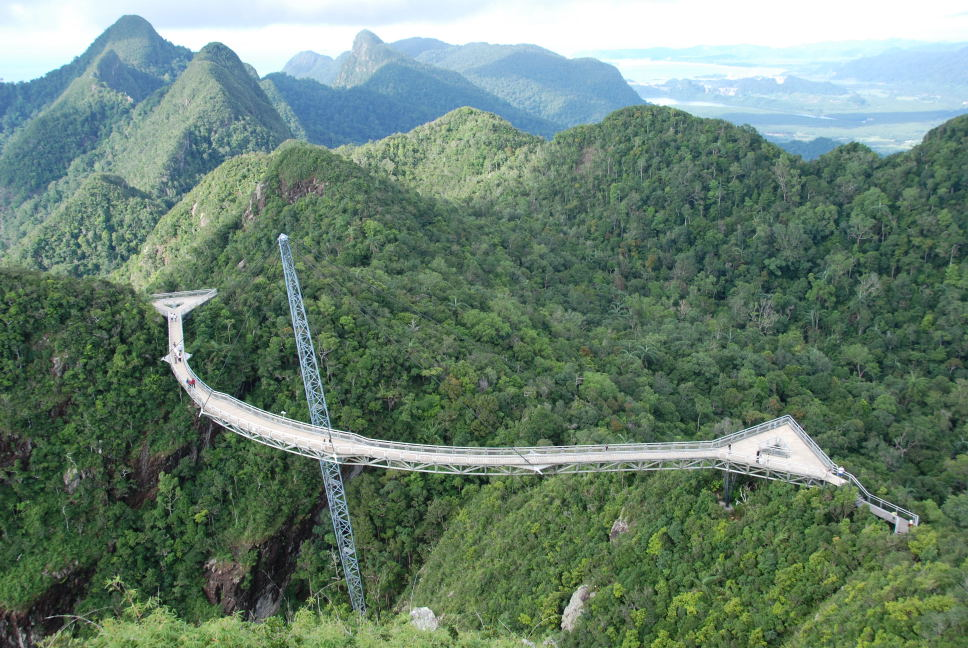
A view of the curved bridge, its wider central section, and the triangular end platforms (2008).

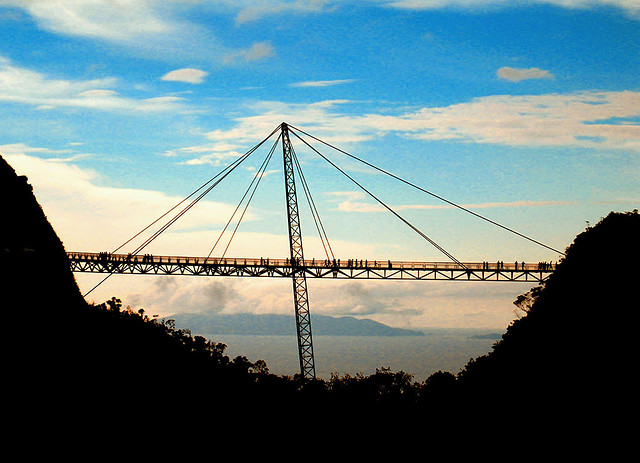
The bridge, pylon and semi-fan cables: two main back-stay cables and four pairs of front-stay cables.

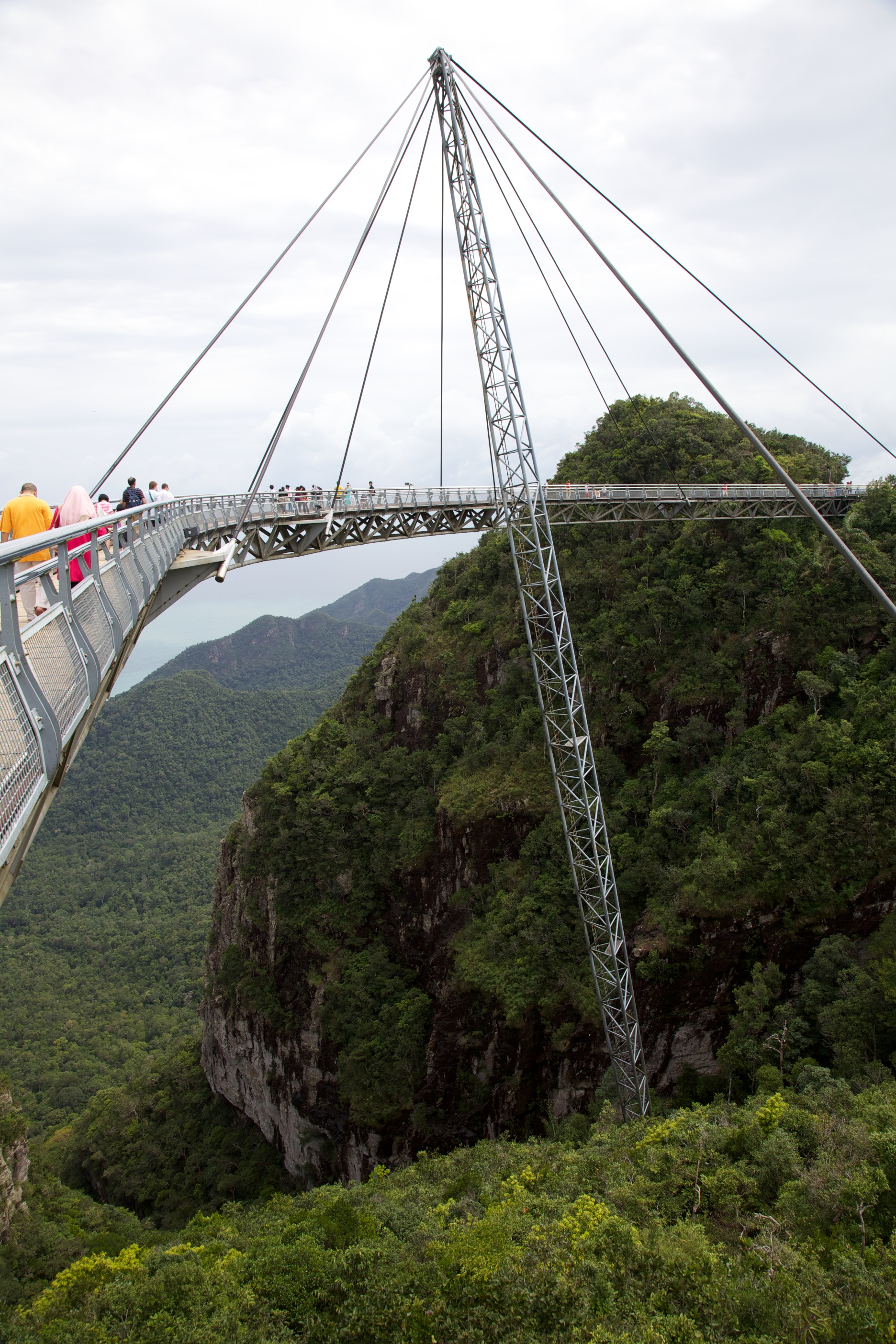
The tilted pylon supporting the bridge

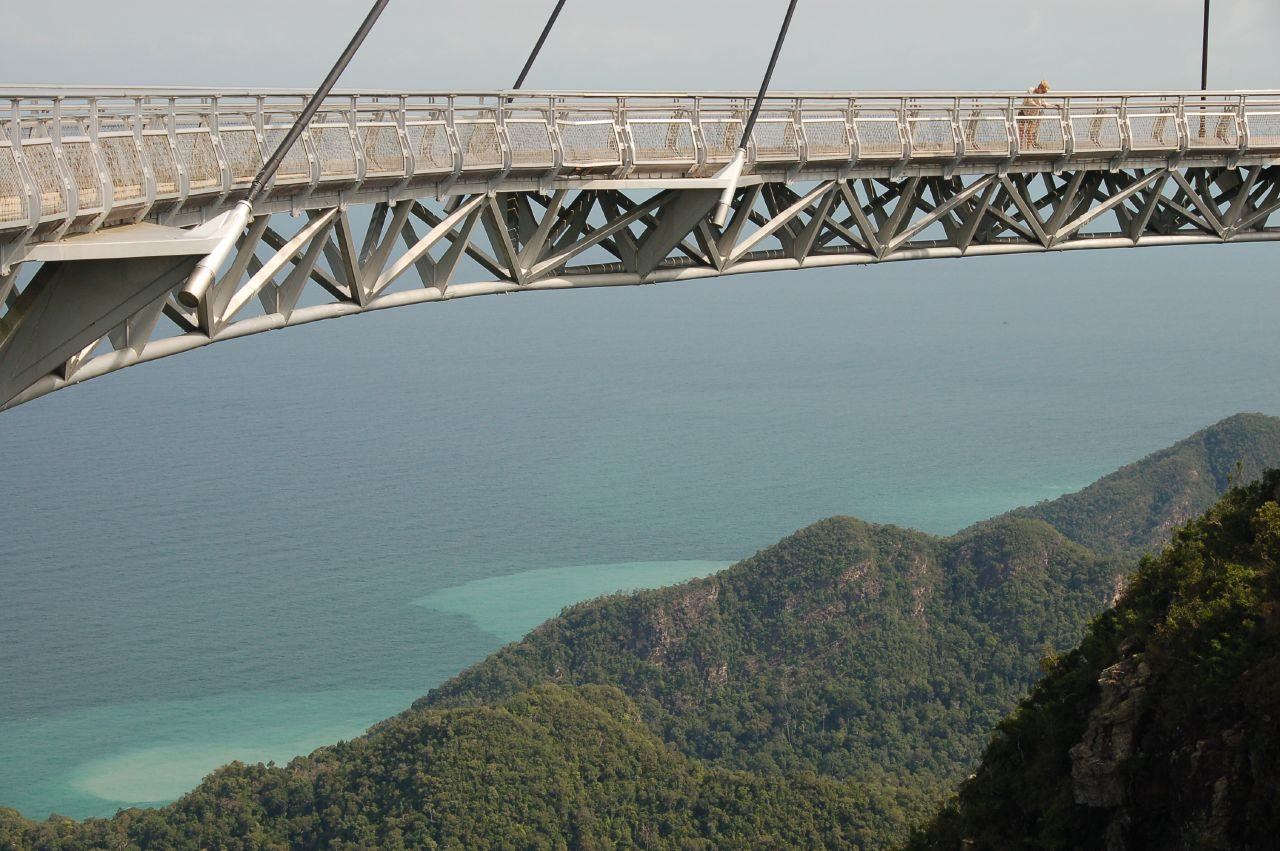
The inverted triangular truss that forms the bridge deck

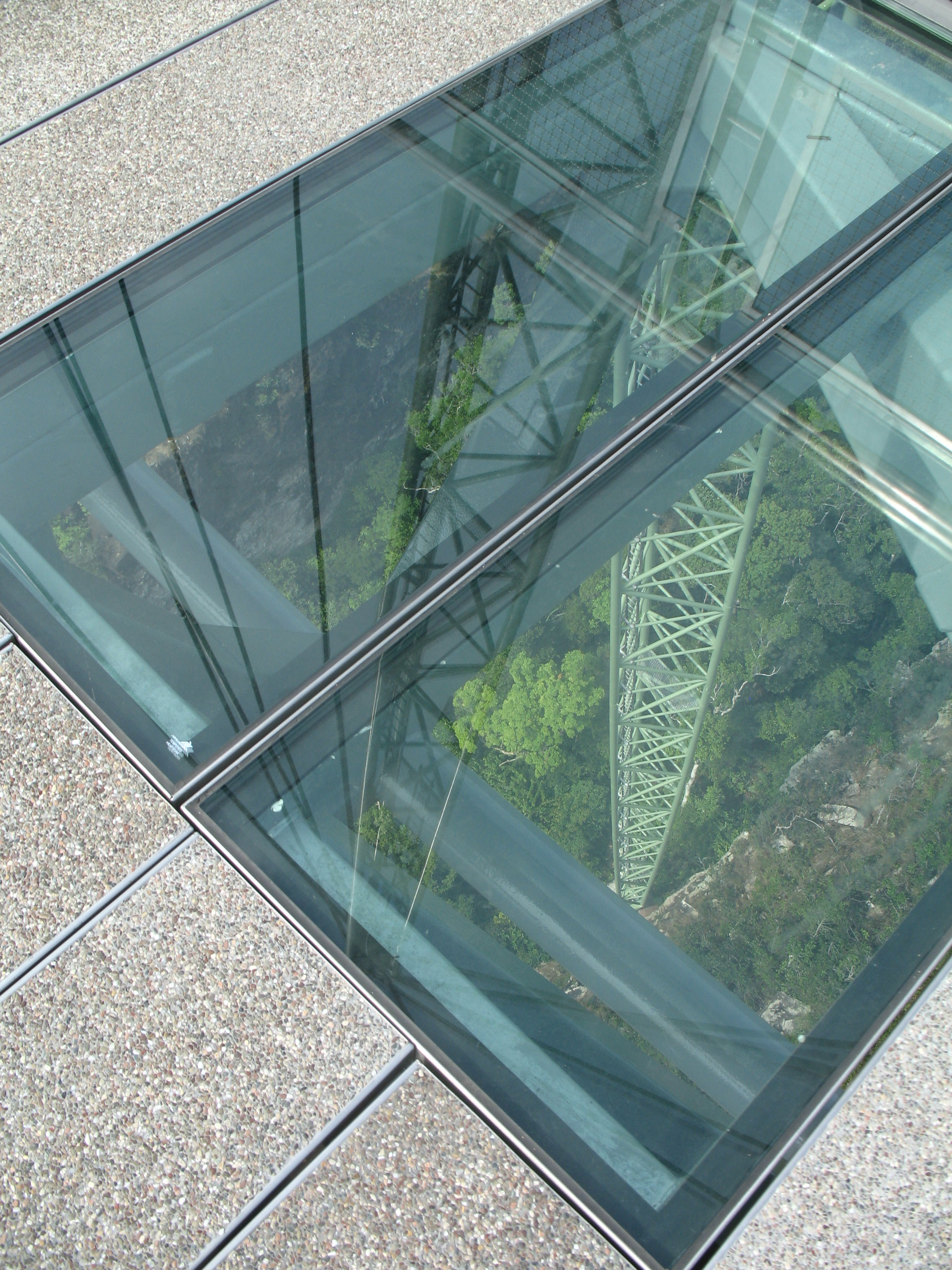
Sections of glass flooring being installed at the bridge

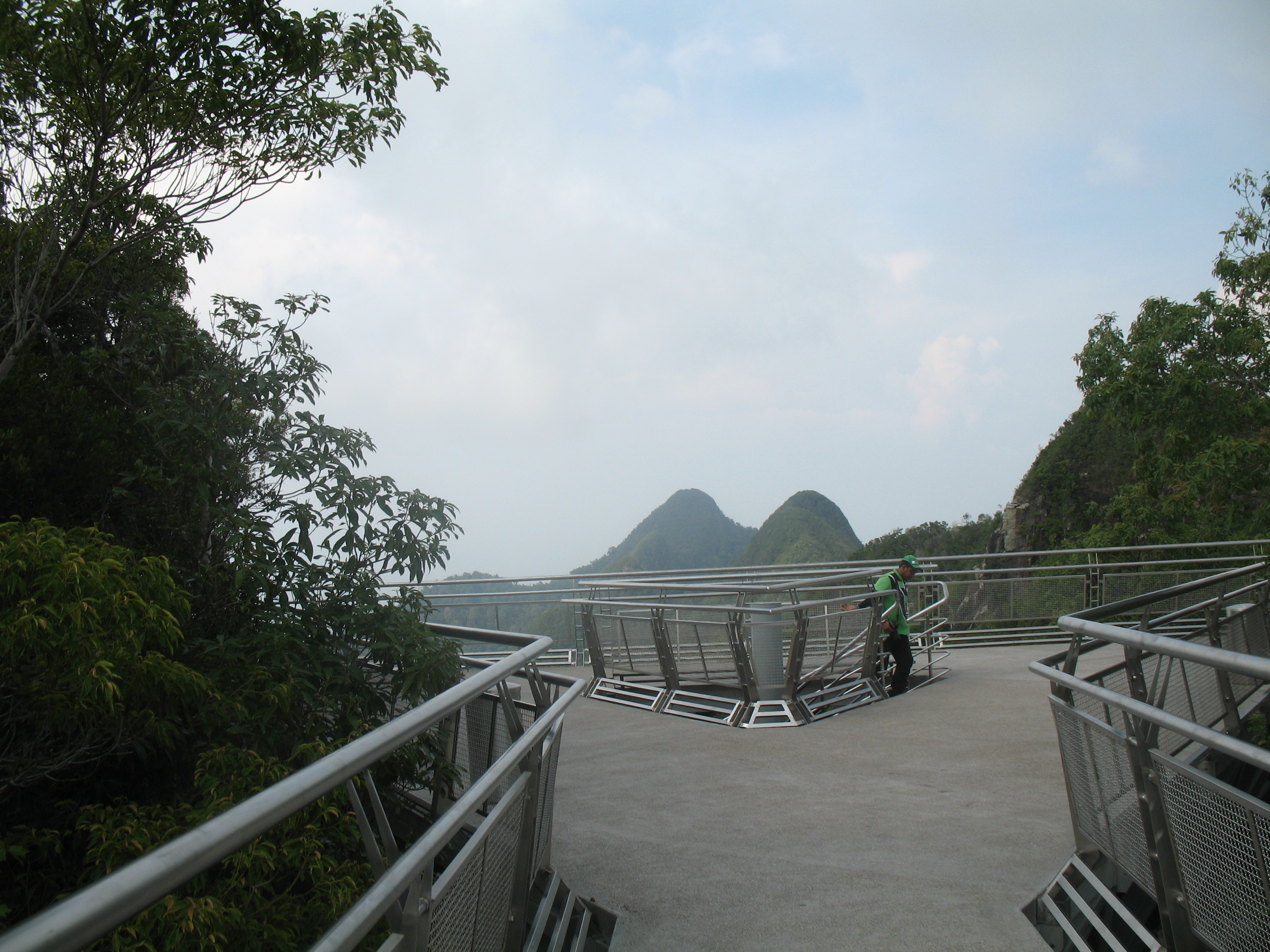
Triangular platform at the end of the Langkawi Sky Bridge with access from below.

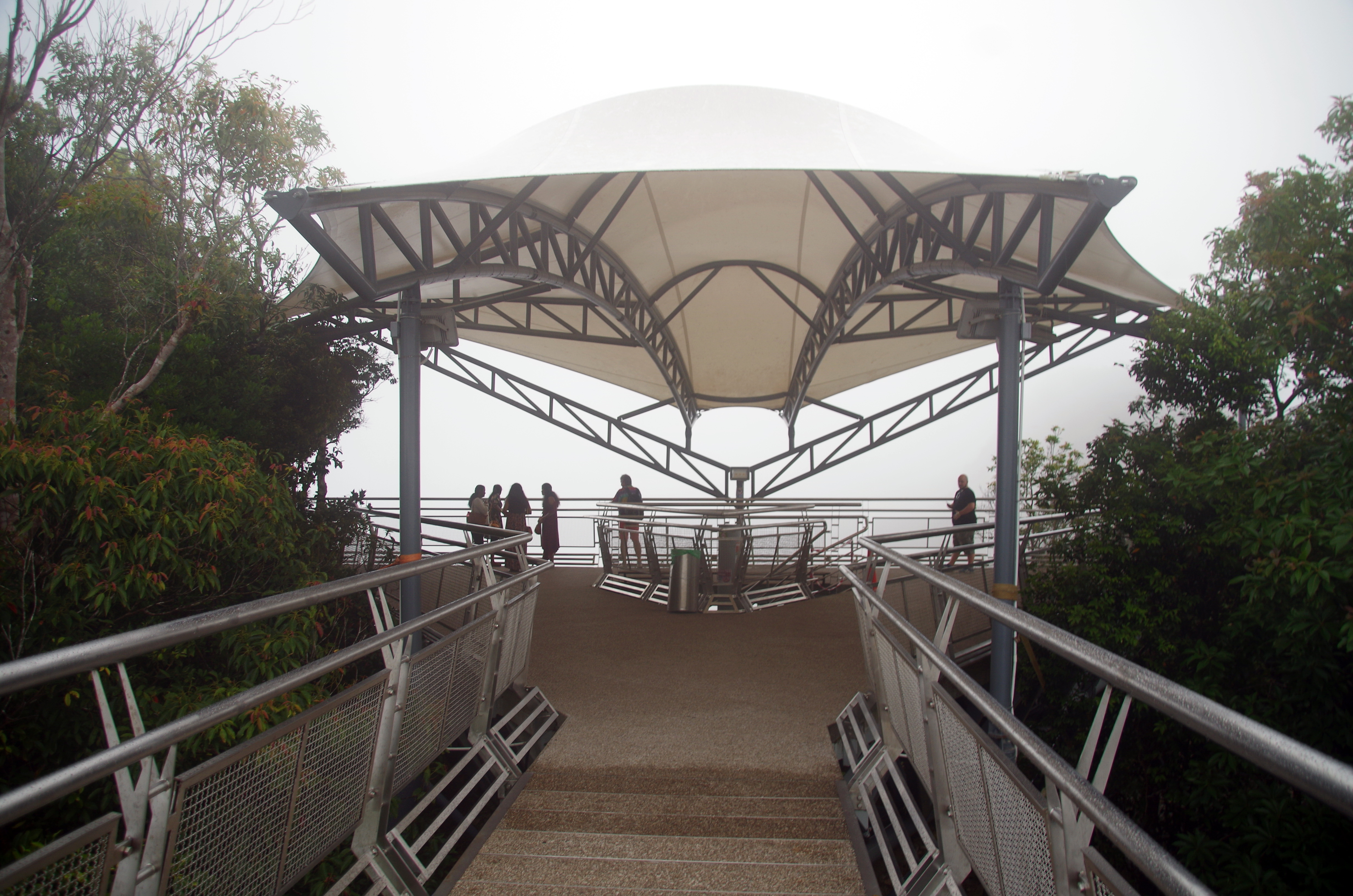
Platform viewed from SkyGlide
