= Fly Away =

Fly Away or Flyaway may refer to:

== Music ==
=== Albums ===
- Fly Away (Banaroo album), 2007
- Fly Away (Corrinne May album), 2001
- Flyaway (Nutshell album), 1997
- Fly Away (Paul Wright album), 2003
- Fly Away (Voyage album), 1978
- Fly Away, by All Angels, 2009
- Fly Away, by Driver Friendly, 2004

=== Songs ===
- "Fly Away" (5 Seconds of Summer song), 2015
- "Fly Away" (Blackfoot song), 1981
- "Fly Away" (David Foster song), 1980 (popularized by Peter Allen)
- "Fly Away" (Haddaway song), 1995
- "Fly Away" (Honey Ryder song), 2009
- "Fly Away" (John Denver song), 1975
- "Fly Away" (Lead song), 2003
- "Fly Away" (Lenny Kravitz song), 1998
- "Fly Away" (Loretta Lynn song), 1988
- "Fly Away" (Seo In-guk song), 2013
- "Fly Away" (Tones and I song), 2020
- "Fly Away", by Asami Izawa from the TV series Eureka Seven
- "Fly Away", by The Black Eyed Peas from the album Elephunk, 2003
- "Fly Away", by BtoB from the album Brother Act., 2017
- "Fly Away", by BXB from the album Intro: Flight and a New Beginning , 2023
- "Fly Away", by Cecilia from the album Inner Harmony, 1999
- "Fly Away", by The Cheetah Girls from the soundtrack to the film The Cheetah Girls: One World, 2008
- "Fly Away", by D4vd, 2022
- "Fly Away", by Daniel Powter from his album Under the Radar, 2008
- "Fly Away", by Dee Carstensen, 2005
- "Fly Away", by DJ Company
- "Fly Away", by Lutricia McNeal from the album Whatcha Been Doing, 1999
- "Fly Away", by Misia from the album Kiss in the Sky, 2002
- "Fly Away", by Nelly from the soundtrack to the film The Longest Yard, 2005
- "Fly Away", by Ocean Grove from the album Oddworld, 2024
- "Fly Away", by Peter Andre from the album Angels & Demons, 2012
- "Fly Away", by Sugarland from the album Twice the Speed of Life, 2004
- "Fly Away", by T-Pain from the album Rappa Ternt Sanga, 2005
- "Fly Away", by TeddyLoid from the soundtrack of the TV series Panty & Stocking with Garterbelt, 2010
- "Fly Away", by TheFatRat ft. Anjulie, 2017
- "Fly Away", by Tomoya Ohtani from the soundtrack of the mobile game Sonic Runners, 2015
- "Last Dollar (Fly Away)", a 2007 song by Tim McGraw from the album Let It Go
- "Fly Away", by Wes Nelson ft. French Montana, 2022

== Other ==
- Fly Away (film), a 2011 American dramatic film
- Flyaway (novel), a 1978 first-person narrative thriller novel by Desmond Bagley
- Flyaway, a 2012 novel by Lucy Christopher
- FlyAway (bus), a shuttle bus service created and funded by Los Angeles World Airports
- "Fly Away" (Cold Case), a 2003 television episode
- "Fly Away" (The Following), a 2014 television episode

== See also ==
- Fly (disambiguation)
