= Steven Wilson discography =

This is a discography of Steven Wilson's solo albums, his work with the band Porcupine Tree, his side projects and collaborations with other artists.

== Solo work ==
Steven Wilson discography
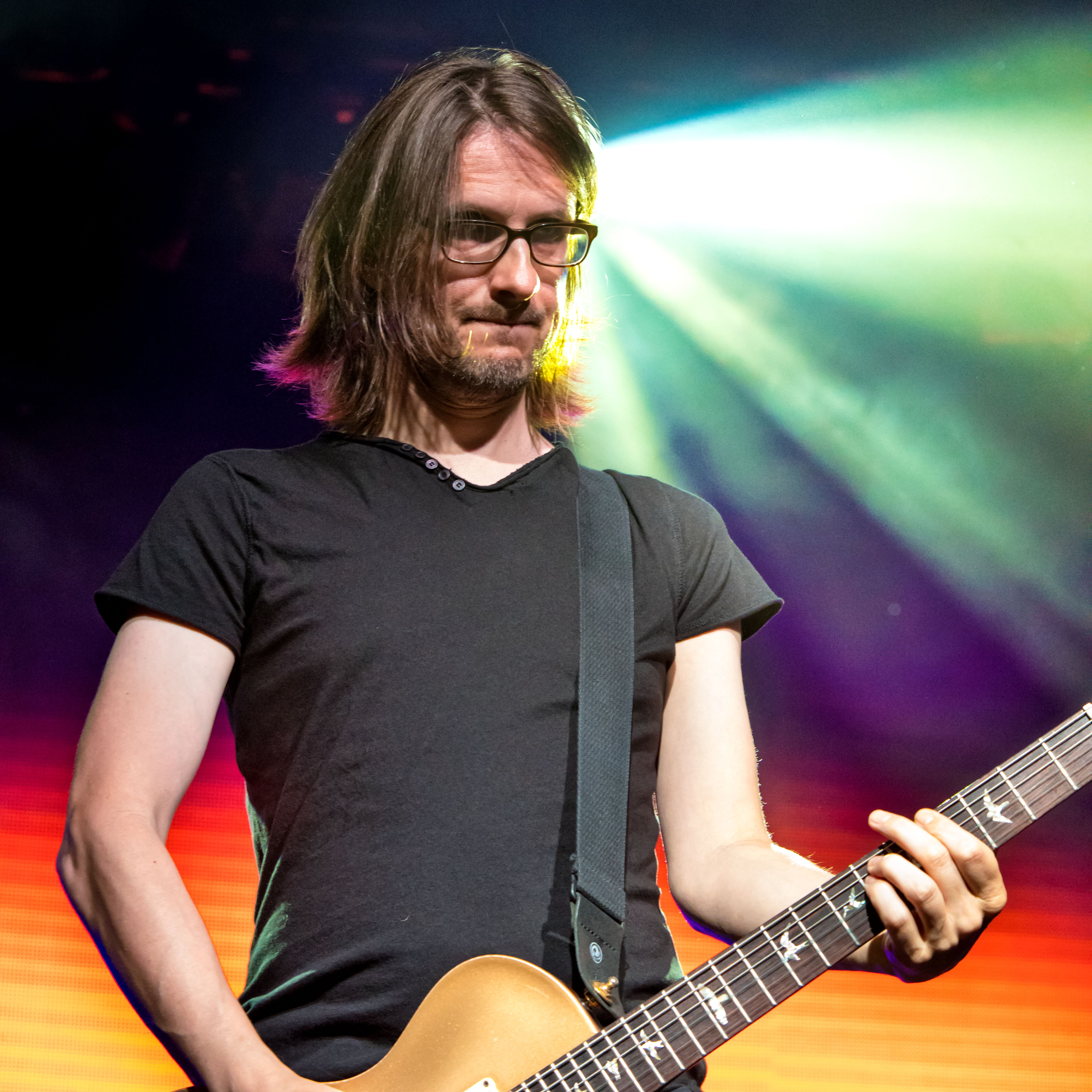
- Wilson performing in Germany in 2016, during Hand. Cannot. Erase. tour.
- Studio albums: 9
- Extended plays: 4
- Live albums: 3
- Compilation albums: 5
- Singles: 23
- Video albums: 2
- Soundtracks: 1
- Music videos: 31

=== Studio albums ===
List of studio albums, with selected details and chart positions
Title	Album details	Peak chart positions							
Title	Album details	UK	AUS	FIN	FRA	GER	NLD	POL	US
Insurgentes	Release date: 26 November 2008; Label: Kscope	116	—	—	114	81	78	15	—
Grace for Drowning	Release date: 26 September 2011; Label: Kscope	34	—	30	96	22	22	7	85
The Raven That Refused to Sing (And Other Stories)	Release date: 25 February 2013; Label: Kscope	28	—	17	51	3	16	25	57
Hand. Cannot. Erase.	Release date: 27 February 2015; Label: Kscope	13	—	4	44	3	2	10	39
To the Bone	Release date: 18 August 2017; Label: Caroline International	3	30	1	15	2	4	14	58
The Future Bites	Release date: 29 January 2021; Label: Caroline International	4	47	3	41	3	2	8	193
The Harmony Codex	Release date: 29 September 2023; Label: Virgin	4	72	13	25	3	2	7	—
The Overview	Release date: 14 March 2025; Label: Fiction	3	53	12	21	1	3	9	139
Requiem for a Village	Release date: 6 November 2026; Label: Fiction	6	49	13	41	1	2	6	—
"—" denotes a recording that did not chart or was not released in that territory.

=== Live albums ===
List of live albums, with selected details, chart positions and notes
Title	Album details	Peak chart positions			Notes
Title	Album details	FIN	GER	NLD	Notes
Catalogue / Preserve / Amass	Release date: 8 February 2012; Label: Headphone Dust	—	—	—	CD edition, limited to 3,000 copies, was only available through pre-order directly from Wilson's website and at live shows from the Grace for Drowning tour. A Record Store Day vinyl edition, limited to 2,000 copies, featured a condensed track list.
Get All You Deserve	Release date: 25 September 2012; Label: Kscope	1	52	4	Released as DVD and Blu-ray versions with deluxe edition including both formats as well as concert's audio on two CDs.
Home Invasion: In Concert at the Royal Albert Hall	Release date: 2 November 2018; Label: Eagle Rock	—	9	35	Filmed on the third and final night of Wilson's Royal Albert Hall residence in March 2018. Available on Blu-ray, DVD, CD and vinyl (the latter being released in March 2019).
"—" denotes a recording that did not chart or was not released in that territory.

=== Compilation albums ===
List of compilation albums, with selected details, chart positions and notes
Title	Album details	Peak chart positions					Notes
Title	Album details	UK	FRA	GER	NLD	POL	Notes
Unreleased Electronic Music Vol. 1	Release date: April 2004; Label: Headphone Dust, ToneFloat	—	—	—	—	—	Compilation featuring Wilson's experiments in electronic music between 1990–2003. Released as CD-R packed in a DVD case, with unique polaroid and signed index card.^{[a]} The vinyl edition is limited to 500 copies and contains "Shortwave (Remix)" as a bonus track.
Tape Experiments 1985–86	Release date: 1 September 2010; Label: Headphone Dust, ToneFloat	—	—	—	—	—	Compilation featuring Wilson's early experimental material originally recorded on cassette. Released as digital download. The vinyl edition is limited to 180 copies.
Cover Version	Release date: 30 June 2014; Label: Kscope	—	—	—	60	46	Compilation album consisting of six Cover Version singles released in 2003–2010.
Transience	Release date: 11 September 2015; Label: Kscope	59	123	52	83	—	Compilation album featuring songs from releases recorded in 2003–2015.
Limited Edition of One	Release date: 6 May 2022; Label: Constable	—	—	—	—	—	Compilation album featuring songs recorded in 1981–1987. The CD is included in the Special Edition and Artist's Edition versions of Wilson's autobiography of the same name.
"—" denotes a recording that did not chart or was not released in that territory.

=== EPs ===
List of EPs, with selected details, chart positions and notes
Title	Details	Peak chart positions					Notes
Title	Details	UK	FIN	FRA	NLD	POL	Notes
NSRGNTS RMXS	Release date: 29 June 2009; Label: Kscope	—	—	—	—	—	EP comprising remixed versions of songs featured on the Insurgentes album.
Drive Home	Release date: 21 October 2013; Label: Kscope	68	—	—	8	—	Video EP featuring unreleased songs and music videos with live material on both audio and video; released as Blu-ray/CD and DVD/CD versions.
4½	Release date: 22 January 2016; Label: Kscope	21	13	55	9	49	EP of songs that were written during the creation of albums The Raven That Refused to Sing (And Other Stories) and Hand. Cannot. Erase.
The B-Sides Collection	Release date: 7 December 2020; Label: Caroline International	—	—	—	—	—	EP consisting of four songs released as B-sides on the singles from the album The Future Bites; released as digital download.
"—" denotes a recording that did not chart or was not released in that territory.

=== Soundtracks ===
List of soundtracks, with selected details and notes
Title	Details	Notes
Last Day of June	Release date: 1 December 2017; Label: Caroline International	Original score for a puzzle video game by Ovosonico and 505 Games; originally released as digital download, standard vinyl edition alongside two limited color vinyl editions were released in November 2021.

=== Singles ===
List of singles, showing year released, album name and notes
Year	Title	Album	Notes
2009	"Harmony Korine": Release date: 23 February 2009; Label: Kscope; Format:	Insurgentes	Released as black, white and red vinyl editions, each limited to 1,000 copies.
2010	"Vapour Trail Lullaby": Release date: October 2010; Label: Headphone Dust; Format: CD		One track single given away with pre-orders of the Insurgentes music DVD.
2011	"Stoneage Dinosaurs / Fear": Release date: 16 April 2011; Label: Kscope; Format: 7"	Leader of the Starry Skies: A Tribute to Tim Smith, Songbook 1	A split single with Oceansize covering the Cardiacs and Spratleys Japs tracks, with Wilson contributing "Stoneage Dinosaurs". Released on white vinyl for Record Store Day 2011, limited to 2,000 copies with all profits funding Cardiacs frontman Tim Smith's care.
2011	"Postcard": Release date: 10 October 2011; Label: Kscope; Format: Download	Grace for Drowning	
2016	"Happiness III": Release date: 14 October 2016; Label: Kscope; Format: 7", Download	4½	Features "Space Oddity (Live)" as B-side. The vinyl edition is limited to 3,000 copies.
2017	"Pariah": Release date: 9 May 2017; Label: Caroline International; Format: CD, Download	To the Bone	Features radio, album and instrumental edits of "Pariah".
2017	"The Same Asylum as Before": Release date: 2 June 2017; Label: Caroline International; Format: Download	To the Bone	
2017	"Song of I": Release date: 9 June 2017; Label: Caroline International; Format: Download	To the Bone	
2017	"Permanating": Release date: 30 June 2017; Label: Caroline International; Format: CD, Download	To the Bone	Features instrumental version of “Permanating”
2017	"Refuge": Release date: 3 August 2017; Label: Caroline International; Format: Download	To the Bone	
2018	"How Big the Space": Release date: 21 April 2018; Label: Caroline International; Format: 12"		Features "People Who Eat Darkness (Ninet version)" as B-side. Limited Record Store Day release.
2020	"Personal Shopper": Release date: 12 March 2020; Label: Caroline International; Format: Download	The Future Bites	
2020	"Eminent Sleaze": Release date: 22 September 2020; Label: Caroline International; Format: 12", CD, Download	The Future Bites	Limited vinyl and CD editions feature tracks "Eyewitness" and "In Floral Green" as B-side.
2020	"King Ghost": Release date: 31 October 2020; Label: Caroline International; Format: Download	The Future Bites	
2020	"12 Things I Forgot": Release date: 24 November 2020; Label: Caroline International; Format: 12", Download	The Future Bites	Limited vinyl edition features tracks "Move Like a Fever" and "King Ghost (Tangerine Dream Remix)" as B-side.
2023	"Economies of Scale": Release date: 29 August 2023; Label: Virgin Records; Format: Download	The Harmony Codex	
2023	"Impossible Tightrope": Release date: 5 September 2023; Label: Virgin Records; Format: Download	The Harmony Codex	
2023	"Rock Bottom": Release date: 12 September 2023; Label: Virgin Records; Format: Download	The Harmony Codex	
2023	"What Life Brings": Release date: 19 September 2023; Label: Virgin Records; Format: Download	The Harmony Codex	
2023	"December Skies": Release date: 25 December 2023; Label: Transmission; Format: 7", CD, Download		A non-album single released as a free digital download on 25 December 2023, and later as a 7" vinyl and CD on 6 December 2024. The physical editions include three Christmas cards in envelopes.
2026	"Requiem for a Village": Release date: 11 September 2026; Label: Fiction; Format: Download	Requiem for a Village	
2026	"On Chapel Slope": Release date: 2 October 2026; Label: Fiction; Format: Download	Requiem for a Village	
2026	"A Basket of Bees": Release date: 26 October 2026; Label: Fiction; Format: Download	Requiem for a Village	

=== Music videos ===
List of music videos, showing year released, album and director name
Year	Title	Album	Director
2009	"Harmony Korine"	Insurgentes	Lasse Hoile
2011	"Track One"	Grace for Drowning	Lasse Hoile
2011	"Index"	Grace for Drowning	Lasse Hoile
2011	"Remainder the Black Dog"	Grace for Drowning	Lasse Hoile
2011	"Belle de Jour"	Grace for Drowning	Lasse Hoile
2013	"The Raven That Refused to Sing"	The Raven That Refused to Sing (And Other Stories)	Jessica Cope
2013	"Drive Home"	The Raven That Refused to Sing (And Other Stories)	Jessica Cope
2015	"Perfect Life"	Hand. Cannot. Erase.	Youssef Nassar
2015	"Routine"	Hand. Cannot. Erase.	Jessica Cope
2016	"Hand Cannot Erase"	Hand. Cannot. Erase.	Lasse Hoile
2016	"Happy Returns"	Hand. Cannot. Erase.	Youssef Nassar
2017	"Pariah"	To the Bone	Lasse Hoile
2017	"Song of I"	To the Bone	Lasse Hoile
2017	"Nowhere Now"	To the Bone	Lasse Hoile
2017	"Permanating"	To the Bone	Andrew Morgan
2018	"People Who Eat Darkness"	To the Bone	Jessica Cope
2019	"Same Asylum As Before"	To the Bone	Lasse Hoile
2019	"Song of Unborn"	To the Bone	Jessica Cope
2020	"Eminent Sleaze"	The Future Bites	Miles Skarin
2020	"King Ghost"	The Future Bites	Jessica Cope
2020	"Personal Shopper"	The Future Bites	Lucrecia Taormina
2021	"Self"	The Future Bites	Miles Skarin
2023	"Economies of Scale"	The Harmony Codex	Charlie Di Placido
2023	"Impossible Tightrope"	The Harmony Codex	Miles Skarin
2023	"Rock Bottom"	The Harmony Codex	Nimrod Peled
2023	"What Life Brings"	The Harmony Codex	Charlie Di Placido
2023	"The Harmony Codex"	The Harmony Codex	Miles Skarin
2023	"Beautiful Scarecrow"	The Harmony Codex	Jessica Cope; Venkatram Viswanathan
2025	"Objects: Meanwhile"	The Overview	Miles Skarin
2025	"Perspective"	The Overview	Miles Skarin
2026	"On Chapel Slope"	Requiem for a Village	Mike Bennion

a – Each CD-R copy of Unreleased Electronic Music Vol. 1 contains its own one of a kind original Polaroid photograph taken by Lasse Hoile specifically for the project. David Schroeder has set up a webpage dedicated to displaying Hoile's polaroids in numerical order along with their owner's names. Some of these Polaroids can now be found in the "Old Polaroids" album at Hoile's MySpace page.

== Early projects and releases ==
=== Amber Dawn ===
Amber Dawn were a progressive rock band active in early 1980s. It was the first "real band" Wilson was a member of. It disbanded in 1982 when the band's bassist left the band to go to university. The band released one cassette, which was recorded in a proper studio.

Title	Album details	Notes
Ash Ridge	Release date: 1983; Format: Cassette	Features eight songs; only a handful of copies were produced for the band members and friends.

=== Altamont ===
Altamont were an electronica and krautrock duo formed by Steven Wilson and Simon "Si" Vockings. It existed between 1983–1984; Wilson was 15 years old at that time. All of the music was improvised live onto cassette using primitive analog synthesizers and a home made echo machine.

Title	Album details	Notes
Prayer for the Soul	Release date: September 1983; Label: Acid Tapes; Format: Cassette	The cassette released through Acid Tapes was deleted upon Wilson's request, but there was a promotional copy in circulation for some time.
Untitled	Release date: September 2002; Label: Headphone Dust; Format: LP	Picture disc edition limited to 300 copies, of which 250 were for sale.

=== Karma ===
Karma were a band that existed between 1982–1986. It featured Wilson and three of his schoolmates. Both albums were recorded and self-released by Wilson and Marc Gordon, the drummer of the band. There are also several existing live recordings of the Karma era, but they are single copy cassettes owned by Wilson that have never been published.

Title	Album details	Notes
The Joke's on You	Release date: October 1983; Format: Cassette	Contained tracks "Intruder d'Or", "Tigers in the Rain", "Small Fish" and "Nine Cats". The latter two were later re-recorded and included on the Porcupine Tree albums Up the Downstair and On the Sunday of Life, respectively.
The Last Man to Laugh	Release date: 1985; Format: Cassette	Contained tracks "Where Is the End If There's No Beginning?", "A Peace on Earth and Good Swill to All Pigs (Part 1 & 2)" and "Counterparts". The latter was 30 minutes of remixes and alternate takes of first two songs, under one title.

=== God ===
God were an art pop duo formed by Wilson and Richard "Ford" Leggott. It was active in 1987–1993 during which many recordings were made but not published in any way. In 2019, Wilson released three songs from God era as an EP.

Title	Album details	Notes
Panic Underneath the Arches	Release date: 27 September 2019; Label: Tonefloat; Format: 12"	EP featuring tracks "City" (recorded in 1993), "Bad Dreams" (1993) and "Love" (1987). Released as a limited numbered edition, available as marble vinyl (333 copies) and black vinyl (666 copies).

== Separate tracks ==
Tracks released separately by Wilson via Internet through his MySpace and SoundCloud accounts.

Release date	Song	Notes
March 2006	"Well You're Wrong"	That was the first song that Steven Wilson put up on MySpace. A re-recorded and slightly extended version of this song appeared later on Wilson's "Cover Version V" single.
August 2006	"Cut Ribbon"	According to the "Steven Wilson iOS App" : "This was originally written for a planned metal collaboration with Mikael from Opeth about 10 years ago, then later re-recorded for both ‘Insurgentes’ and more recently ‘Grace for Drowning’. Each time I couldn’t really make it fit in with the style of those records so here it finally finds a home, in its most recent 2010 mixed form." It has been widely bootlegged, but incorrectly attributed to Porcupine Tree, since it comes from the same period as several demos for the In Absentia album circa 2002. Versions available include the 2002 leaked version, a slightly different 2006 mix from Wilson's MySpace, and the 2010 version left off of Grace for Drowning.
August 2006	"Collecting Space"	An instrumental demo made in 2003 during writing sessions for Porcupine Tree's Deadwing album, but never recorded by the band. A proper version of this piece was released on the limited edition of the 1st Steven's solo album called Insurgentes, while this demo appears as an extra track on the Insurgentes movie DVD.
October 2006	"Vapour Trail Lullaby"	According to Steven Wilson: "I found this on a CDR of demos from around 2000, and it's an early version of the song that was later recorded for the first Blackfield album with a much more stripped down piano and string quartet arrangement. Here I was obviously going for something a bit more epic (the full version lasts about 16 minutes, but this is the first 6). After Rush called their album 'Vapour Trails' I changed the title of the Blackfield version to just Lullaby."
October 2006	"Deadwing Theme"	This is a short piece written for the prospective soundtrack to the film "Deadwing", which exists at present only as a screenplay written by Steven Wilson and film-maker Mike Bennion. Although this piece was written during the Deadwing album sessions, it was not released on the standard or limited editions of the album of the same name. It was officially released in 2010 as an extra track on the Insurgentes movie DVD. It features melodies from an earlier demo "Godfearing" which was written - according to Wilson - circa 2001/2003.
June 2012	"Godfearing"	According to Steven Wilson: "I found this on an old computer – it's a demo for either the In Absentia or Deadwing albums, something that never got used – I can't be totally sure because while it shares lyrical themes with the songs on In Absentia, one of the melodies seems to relate to another piece from Deadwing era. I don't remember too much about it, other than I guess it wasn't good enough to get any further than this. Rescued from the abyss, so I only have a compressed audio file of this one, sorry about that."

== Guest appearances and contributions ==
Year	Album	Artist	Credit(s)
1994	Flame	Richard Barbieri & Tim Bowness	Guitar on "Song of Love and Everything (Part I and II)" and "Flame"
1994	Seed	JBK	Guitar on "Prey"
1995	The Exstasie	Psychomuzak	Producer
1995	The Tooth Mother	Mick Karn	Guitar on "Thundergirl Mutation" and "Plaster the Magic Tongue"
1995	Stone to Flesh	Steve Jansen & Richard Barbieri	Guitar on "Mother London", "Sleepers Awake", "Ringing the Bell Backwards" and "Closer Than 'I'"
1995	A Winter Harvest	Coltsfoot	Guitar and keyboards on "Walk Between the Lines" and "Wood for the Trees"
1996	Live at the Milky Way	Steve Jansen & Richard Barbieri	Guitar
1997	Indigo Falls	Indigo Falls	Guitar on "The Wilderness"
1997	Sunsets on Empire	Fish	Producer, co-writer, keyboards and guitar on most tracks
1999	No Ordinary Man	Cipher	Mixing, guitar on "The Waiting" and "Bodhidharma"
1999	Raingods with Zippos	Fish	Guitar on "Tumbledown", "Faithhealer" and "Plague of Ghosts"
1999	marillion.com	Marillion	Additional production and mixing
1999	New Worlds By Design	Spirits Burning	Guitar on "The Ticking of Science"
1999	World of Bright Futures	Tim Bowness & Samuel Smiles	Producer and guitar on "Watching Over Me"
2001	Blackwater Park	Opeth	Producer, keyboards, mellotron, backing vocals
2001	Heart of the Sun	Theo Travis	Co-producer, mixing
2001	Smiling & Waving	Anja Garbarek	Producer
2001	Culinaire Lingus	Ange	Mixing on "Jusqu'où Iront-Ils" and "Cadavres Exquis"
2001	Playing in a Room with People	JBK	Guitar
2001	Postmankind	Ian Mosley & Ben Castle	Mixing
2001	Henry Fool	Henry Fool	Mixing on "Poppy Q" and "Heartattack"
2002	One Who Whispers	Cipher	Co-producer, mixing
2002	Deliverance	Opeth	Producer, backing vocals, piano, mellotron, additional guitar
2003	Office of Strategic Influence	OSI	Co-writer and vocals on "shutDOWN"
2003	Damnation	Opeth	Producer, keyboards, piano, mellotron, backing vocals, co-writer on "Death Whispered a Lullaby"
2003	Will I / Fly	Yoko Ono	Remixing on "Death of Samantha"
2003	Time and Emotion Study	Ex-Wise Heads	Mixing on "Slender Threads"
2004	Blah Street	Ben Castle	Mixing
2004	Marbles	Marillion	Mixing on "Angelina"
2004	Kallocain	Paatos	Mixing
2004	The DAC Mixes	Darkroom	Remixing on "After Dark"
2004	Legacy	Vidna Obmana	Guitar solo on "Legacy"
2004	Earth to Ether	Theo Travis	Mixing, mastering
2005	Shiver	John Wesley	Mixing
2006	In My Father's House are Many Mansions	Andrew Liles	Remixing on "Something to Do with Hans Bellmer in a Pub at Last Orders Using 15th Century Rural Magic"
2006	With the Time	Aviv Geffen	Backing vocals on "Thousands of People" and "You, Me and the Dog"
2007	Slow Life	Theo Travis	Performer on "Behind These Silent Eyes"
2007	The Bowing Harmony	Vidna Obmana	Vocals
2007	Neither Speak Nor Remain Silent	Fovea Hex	Guitar on "Allure"
2007	Systematic Chaos	Dream Theater	Spoken word on "Repentance"
2007	Once We All Walk Through Solid Objects	Fear Falls Burning	Performer on "Fear Falls Burning vs Bass Communion"
2007	Black Sheep	Andrew Liles	Performer on "537171NR848492C (Elongated)"
2007	The Road Home	Jordan Rudess	Vocals on "Tarkus"
2008	Stranger Inside	Richard Barbieri	Mastering
2008	Untitled	The Use of Ashes	Performer on "Mousehill"
2008	I'm Not Here	Sand Snowman	Mastering
2008	Wish of the Flayed	Muslimgauze	Engineering
2008	No One's Words	Ephrat	Mixing, mastering
2008	Thread	Travis & Fripp	Mixing, mastering
2008	איך לאהוב אותך (single)	Alex Moshe & Aviv Geffen	Guitar
2009	Three Fact Fader	Engineers	Remixing on "Sometimes I Realise"
2009	Aviv Geffen	Aviv Geffen	Guitar on "Cloudy Now" and "Silence", guitar and backing vocals on "The One"
2009	Quiver	KTU	Additional mixing on "Kataklasm", "Jacaranda" and "Miasmaa"
2009	Two Way Mirror	Sand Snowman	Vocals on "Faded Flowers" and "Riverrun"
2010	The Never Ending Way of ORWarriOR	Orphaned Land	Co-producer
2010	We're Here Because We're Here	Anathema	Mixing
2010	Immersion	Pendulum	Co-writer and vocals on "The Fountain"
2010	Soup	Stick Men	Mixing on "Soup"
2011	Play	Isolated Atoms	Producer
2011	Warm Winter	Memories of Machines	Engineering, mixing, guitar and keyboards on "Lucky You, Lucky Me"
2011	Heritage	Opeth	Mixing
2011	The World's Not Worth It	Sand Snowman	Vocals on "A Life Rehearsed"
2011	The Road to OR-Shalem	Orphaned Land	Vocals on "M i ?", guitar on "The Beloved's Cry"
2012	Thick as a Brick 2	Ian Anderson	Mixing
2012	Boing, We'll Do It Live!	The Aristocrats	Mixing
2012	Genesis Revisited II	Steve Hackett	Vocals on "Can-Utility and the Coastliners", guitar on "Shadow of the Hierophant"
2012	Follow	Travis & Fripp	Mixing, mastering
2013	Prophecy	Solstice	Remixing on "Find Yourself", "Return of the Spring" and "Earthsong"
2014	Pale Communion	Opeth	Mixing, Backing Vocals
2014	Distant Satellites	Anathema	Mixing on "You're Not Alone" and "Take Shelter"
2014	Disconnect	John Wesley	Mixing on "Window"
2014	The Ghosts of Pripyat	Steve Rothery	Guitar on "Old Man of the Sea"
2014	Abandoned Dancehall Dreams	Tim Bowness	Mixing, guitar, programming
2014	Discretion	Travis & Fripp	Mixing on "Forgotten Days" and "Rhapsody on the Theme of Starless"
2014	Dream Tempest	36	Performer on "Redshift"
2014	Ones and Zeros Reloaded	Saro Cosentino	Engineering on "Days of Flaming Youth"
2014	Hello (single)	Revolution Harmony	Vocals
2015	Stupid Things That Mean the World	Tim Bowness	Co-writer on "Sing to Me", remixing on "Best Boy Electric"
2015	Courting the Widow	Nad Sylvan	Engineering
2015	Glare	North Atlantic Oscillation	Remixing on "Wires"
2015	Lumen	Steve Jansen & Richard Barbieri	Guitar
2015	Transgression	Theo Travis' Double Talk	Mixing, mastering
2016	2112 (40th Anniversary Edition)	Rush	Cover version of "Twilight Zone"
2016	EP One	Paul Draper	Guitars, bass and keyboards on "No Ideas"
2016	The Salt Garden I	Fovea Hex	Remixing on "Solace"
2017	Lost in the Ghost Light	Tim Bowness	Mixing, mastering
2017	Face	Pat Mastelotto & Markus Reuter	Vocals on "Face"
2018	Truth Decay	Adam Holzman	Guitar on "Phobia"
2018	Moths	Jethro Tull	Remixing on "Moths"
2019	Flowers at the Scene	Tim Bowness	Mixing
2019	The Salt Garden III	Fovea Hex	Remixing on "Is Lanza Light & Given"
2019	North Sea Oil	Jethro Tull	Remixing on "North Sea Oil" and "Dun Ringill"
2020	Art Nouveau EP	Art Nouveau	Mastering
2020	Deluxe: Live at CC Luchtbal	Fear Falls Burning	Guitar on "He Contemplates the Sign"
2020	Stormwatch 2	Jethro Tull	Mixing
2020	Late Night Laments	Tim Bowness	Mixing
2020	Selling England by the Pound & Spectral Mornings: Live at Hammersmith	Steve Hackett	Mixing
2021	Insolo	Gary Kemp	Remixing on "Waiting for the Band"
2022	Cult Leader Tactics	Paul Draper	Synthesizers, vocals on "Omega Man", writer on "Lyin Bout Who U Sleep With"
2022	The Tipping Point	Tears for Fears	Mixing
2022	Diamond Star Halos	Def Leppard	Mixing (Dolby Atmos)
2022	Warchild II	Jethro Tull	Mixing
2022	Use Your Illusion I (Super Deluxe Edition)	Guns N' Roses	Mixing on "November Rain"
2022	Butterfly Mind	Tim Bowness	Mixing, mastering
2024	Songs for a Nervous Planet	Tears for Fears	Mixing
2024	Mutual Hallucinations	Randy McStine	Mixing
2024	Aeolus: One Hour Duduk Meditation	Theo Travis	Mixing, mastering
2025	Critical Thinking	Manic Street Preachers	Remixing on "Decline & Fall"
2025	Echoes	Nick Mason's Saucerful of Secrets	Mixing
2025	The Familiar	Vennart	Mixing
2026	Live from the Los Angeles Sports Arena, April 26th, 1975	Pink Floyd	Remastering
2026	8-Tracks	Pink Floyd	Editing
2026	The End of the Continuum	Modelbau	Remixing on "The Last One from Before"

=== Curating ===
Title	Details	Notes
Intrigue: Progressive Sounds in UK Alternative Music 1979–89	Release date: 10 February 2023; Label: Demon Music Group	A 58-track compilation assembled by Wilson, exploring the alternative British music from 1979 to 1989, featuring songs by artists including Kate Bush, Cocteau Twins, Joy Division, Tears for Fears, XTC and many more. Released as 7LP and 4CD box sets with 40-page and 80-page booklets, respectively. A double vinyl edition features a condensed tracklist of 19 songs and a 12-page booklet.

=== Album remixes ===
Steven Wilson has created stereo, 5.1 surround sound and Dolby Atmos mixes for artists including King Crimson, Emerson, Lake & Palmer, Jethro Tull, Yes, XTC, Hawkwind, Gentle Giant, and Caravan, for the following albums:

Year	Album details	Mixes	Source
2009	Red: Artist: King Crimson; Release date: 22 September 2009, 14 October 2013, 25 October 2024; Original release date: 5 October 1974	5.1 surround (2009); Stereo (2013); Stereo, 5.1 surround, Atmos (2024)	
2009	In the Court of the Crimson King: Artist: King Crimson; Release date: 8 December 2009, 8 November 2019, 6 November 2020; Original release date: 10 October 1969	Stereo, 5.1 surround (2009); Stereo, 5.1 surround (2019); Atmos (2020)	
2009	Lizard: Artist: King Crimson; Release date: 12 January 2010, 24 October 2025; Original release date: 11 December 1970	Stereo, 5.1 surround (2009); Stereo, 5.1 surround, Atmos (2025)	
2010	In the Wake of Poseidon: Artist: King Crimson; Release date: 4 October 2010, 24 October 2025; Original release date: 15 May 1970	Stereo, 5.1 surround (2010); Stereo, 5.1 surround, Atmos (2025)	
2010	Islands: Artist: King Crimson; Release date: 4 October 2010, 25 September 2026; Original release date: 3 December 1971	Stereo, 5.1 surround (2010); Stereo, 5.1 surround, Atmos (2026)	
2011	In the Land of Grey and Pink: Artist: Caravan; Release date: 7 June 2011; Original release date: 8 April 1971	Stereo, 5.1 surround	
2011	Starless and Bible Black: Artist: King Crimson; Release date: 25 October 2011; Original release date: 29 March 1974	Stereo, 5.1 surround	
2011	Discipline: Artist: King Crimson; Release date: 25 October 2011; Original release date: 22 September 1981	Stereo, 5.1 surround	
2011	Aqualung: Artist: Jethro Tull; Release date: 31 October 2011, 22 April 2016; Original release date: 19 March 1971	Stereo, 5.1 surround (2011); Atmos (2026)	
2012	Emerson, Lake & Palmer: Artist: Emerson, Lake & Palmer; Release date: 25 September 2012; Original release date: October 1970	Stereo, 5.1 surround	
2012	Tarkus: Artist: Emerson, Lake & Palmer; Release date: 25 September 2012; Original release date: 14 June 1971	Stereo, 5.1 surround	
2012	Larks' Tongues in Aspic: Artist: King Crimson; Release date: 15 October 2012, 20 October 2023; Original release date: 23 March 1973	Stereo, 5.1 surround (2012); Stereo, 5.1 surround, Atmos (2023)	
2012	Thick as a Brick: Artist: Jethro Tull; Release date: 6 November 2012; Original release date: 10 March 1972	Stereo, 5.1 surround	
2013	Warrior on the Edge of Time: Artist: Hawkwind; Release date: 27 May 2013, 5 February 2026; Original release date: 9 May 1975	Stereo, 5.1 surround (2013); Atmos (2026)	
2013	Nonsuch: Artist: XTC; Release date: 18 October 2013; Original release date: 27 April 1992	Stereo, 5.1 surround	
2013	Close to the Edge: Artist: Yes; Release date: 21 October 2013, 7 March 2025; Original release date: 13 September 1972	Stereo, 5.1 surround (2013); Stereo, 5.1 surround, Atmos (2025)	
2013	Benefit: Artist: Jethro Tull; Release date: 28 October 2013; Original release date: 1 May 1970	Stereo, 5.1 surround	
2014	The Yes Album: Artist: Yes; Release date: 14 April 2014, 24 November 2023; Original release date: 19 February 1971	Stereo, 5.1 surround (2014); Atmos (2023)	
2014	A Passion Play: Artist: Jethro Tull; Release date: 13 June 2014; Original release date: 6 July 1973	Stereo, 5.1 surround	
2014	The Power and the Glory: Artist: Gentle Giant; Release date: 17 July 2014, 24 April 2026; Original release date: 20 September 1974	Stereo, 5.1 surround (2014); Atmos (2026)	
2014	Drums and Wires: Artist: XTC; Release Date: 27 October 2014, 26 September 2025; Original release date: 17 August 1979	Stereo, 5.1 surround (2014); Atmos (2025)	
2014	Relayer: Artist: Yes; Release date: 3 November 2014; Original release date: 28 November 1974	Stereo, 5.1 surround	
2014	Songs from the Big Chair: Artist: Tears for Fears; Release date: 10 November 2014, 14 November 2025; Original release date: 25 February 1985	Stereo, 5.1 surround (2014); Stereo, 5.1 surround, Atmos (2025)	
2014	War Child: Artist: Jethro Tull; Release date: 24 November 2014, 11 September 2026; Original release date: 14 October 1974	Stereo, 5.1 surround (2014); Atmos (2026)	
2015	Sparkle in the Rain: Artist: Simple Minds; Release date: 16 March 2015; Original release date: 1984	Stereo, 5.1 surround	
2015	Minstrel in the Gallery: Artist: Jethro Tull; Release date: 4 May 2015; Original release date: 5 September 1975	Stereo, 5.1 surround	
2015	Please Don't Touch!: Artist: Steve Hackett; Release date: 1 July 2015; Original release date: April 1978	Stereo, 5.1 surround	
2015	Spectral Mornings: Artist: Steve Hackett; Release date: 1 July 2015; Original release date: May 1979	Stereo, 5.1 surround	
2015	Oranges and Lemons: Artist: XTC; Release date: 16 October 2015; Original release date: 27 February 1989	Stereo, 5.1 surround	
2015	Octopus: Artist: Gentle Giant; Release date: 30 October 2015; Original release date: 1 December 1972	Stereo, 5.1 surround	
2015	Fragile: Artist: Yes; Release date: 30 October 2015, 28 June 2024; Original release date: 26 November 1971	Stereo, 5.1 surround (2015); Stereo, 5.1 surround, Atmos (2024)	
2015	Damnation: Artist: Opeth; Release date: 30 October 2015; Original release date: 22 April 2003	Stereo, 5.1 surround	
2015	Too Old to Rock 'n' Roll: Too Young to Die!: Artist: Jethro Tull; Release date: 27 November 2015; Original release date: 23 April 1976	Stereo, 5.1 surround	
2016	Tales from Topographic Oceans: Artist: Yes; Release date: 7 October 2016, 6 February 2026; Original release date: 7 December 1973	Stereo, 5.1 surround (2016); Stereo, 5.1 surround, Atmos (2026)	
2016	Skylarking: Artist: XTC; Release date: 14 October 2016, 27 September 2024; Original release date: 27 October 1986	Stereo, 5.1 surround (2016); Atmos (2024)	
2016	Beat: Artist: King Crimson; Release date: 20 October 2016; Original release date: 18 June 1982	Stereo, 5.1 surround	
2016	Three of a Perfect Pair: Artist: King Crimson; Release date: 20 October 2016; Original release date: 27 March 1984	Stereo, 5.1 surround	
2016	Stand Up: Artist: Jethro Tull; Release date: 18 November 2016; Original release date: 1 August 1969	Stereo, 5.1 surround	
2017	Chicago: Artist: Chicago; Release date: 27 January 2017, 23 May 2025; Original release date: 26 January 1970	Stereo (2017); Atmos (2025)	
2017	Songs from the Wood: Artist: Jethro Tull; Release date: 19 May 2017; Original release date: 11 February 1977	Stereo, 5.1 surround	
2017	Misplaced Childhood: Artist: Marillion; Release date: 9 July 2017; Original release date: 17 June 1985	Stereo, 5.1 surround	
2017	Three Piece Suite: Artist: Gentle Giant; Release date: 29 September 2017; Original release date: 27 November 1970, 16 July 1971, 14 April 1972	Stereo, 5.1 surround (Partial remixes of Gentle Giant, Acquiring the Taste, and Three Friends)	
2017	Black Sea: Artist: XTC; Release date: 24 November 2017; Original release date: 12 September 1980	Stereo, 5.1 surround	
2017	A Farewell to Kings: Artist: Rush; Release date: 1 December 2017; Original release date: 1 September 1977	5.1 surround	
2018	Roxy Music: Artist: Roxy Music; Release date: 2 February 2018; Original release date: 16 June 1972	Stereo, 5.1 surround	
2018	Heavy Horses: Artist: Jethro Tull; Release date: 2 March 2018; Original release date: 10 April 1978	Stereo, 5.1 surround	
2018	Brave: Artist: Marillion; Release date: 9 March 2018; Original release date: 7 February 1994	Stereo, 5.1 surround	
2018	This Was: Artist: Jethro Tull; Release date: 9 November 2018; Original release date: 25 October 1968	Stereo, 5.1 surround	
2019	In Search of Hades: The Virgin Recordings 1973–1979: Artist: Tangerine Dream; Release date: 14 June 2019; Original release date: 1973–1979	Stereo, 5.1 surround (Phaedra and Ricochet)	
2019	Psurroundabout Ride: Artist: XTC as The Dukes of Stratosphear; Release date: 18 October 2019; Original release date: 1 April 1985, 18 August 1987	Stereo, 5.1 surround (2019); Atmos (2026) (25 O'Clock and Psonic Psunspot)	
2019	Stormwatch: Artist: Jethro Tull; Release date: 18 October 2019; Original release date: 14 September 1979	Stereo, 5.1 surround	
2020	Vienna: Artist: Ultravox; Release date: 9 October 2020; Original release date: 11 July 1980	Stereo, 5.1 surround	
2020	The Seeds of Love: Artist: Tears for Fears; Release date: 9 October 2020, 16 October 2026; Original release date: 25 September 1989	5.1 surround (2020); 5.1 surround, Atmos (2026)	
2021	Vol. 4: Artist: Black Sabbath; Release date: 12 February 2021; Original release date: 25 September 1972	Stereo (outtakes only)	
2021	A: Artist: Jethro Tull; Release date: 16 April 2021; Original release date: 29 August 1980	Stereo, 5.1 surround	
2021	Free Hand: Artist: Gentle Giant; Release date: 25 June 2021; Original release date: 22 August 1975	Stereo, 5.1 surround, Atmos	
2021	Technical Ecstasy: Artist: Black Sabbath; Release date: 1 October 2021; Original release date: 25 September 1976	Stereo	
2021	Destroyer: Artist: Kiss; Release date: 19 November 2021; Original release date: 15 March 1976	5.1 surround, Atmos	
2022	Smiling at Grief (vinyl: 2 tracks; CD: 4 tracks): Artist: Twelfth Night; Release date: 25 March 2022; Original release date: January 1982	Stereo	
2022	Exposure: Artist: Robert Fripp; Release date: 27 May 2022; Original release date: June 1979	Stereo, 5.1 surround, Atmos	
2022	"Take On Me": Artist: a-ha; Release date: 2 July 2022; Original release date: 19 October 1984	Atmos	
2022	American Beauty: Artist: Grateful Dead; Release date: 20 August 2022; Original release date: November 1970	Atmos	
2022	Rage in Eden: Artist: Ultravox; Release date: 30 September 2022; Original release date: 11 September 1981	Stereo, 5.1 surround	
2023	Chic: Artist: Chic; Release date: 28 February 2023; Original release date: 22 November 1977	Atmos	
2023	C'est Chic: Artist: Chic; Release date: 28 February 2023; Original release date: 11 August 1978	Atmos	
2023	Risqué: Artist: Chic; Release date: 28 February 2023; Original release date: 30 July 1979	Atmos	
2023	Real People: Artist: Chic; Release date: 28 February 2023; Original release date: 30 June 1980	Atmos	
2023	Take It Off: Artist: Chic; Release date: 28 February 2023; Original release date: 16 November 1981	Atmos	
2023	Moondance: Artist: Van Morrison; Release date: 22 March 2023; Original release date: 27 January 1970	Stereo, Atmos	
2023	The Hurting: Artist: Tears for Fears; Release date: 9 June 2023; Original release date: 7 March 1983	Stereo, 5.1 surround, Atmos	
2023	We Are Family: Artist: Sister Sledge; Release date: 13 June 2023; Original release date: 22 January 1979	Atmos	
2023	Interview: Artist: Gentle Giant; Release date: 16 June 2023; Original release date: 23 April 1976	Stereo, 5.1 surround, Atmos	
2023	Suede: Artist: Suede; Release date: 7 July 2023; Original release date: 29 March 1993	Stereo, 5.1 surround, Atmos	
2023	Quartet: Artist: Ultravox; Release date: 7 July 2023; Original release date: 15 October 1982	Stereo, 5.1 surround	
2023	Wet Dream: Artist: Richard Wright; Release date: 28 July 2023; Original release date: 22 September 1978	Stereo, 5.1 surround, Atmos	
2023	The Lexicon of Love: Artist: ABC; Release date: 4 August 2023; Original release date: 21 June 1982	Stereo, 5.1 surround, Atmos	
2023	The Broadsword and the Beast: Artist: Jethro Tull; Release date: 1 September 2023; Original release date: 10 April 1982	Stereo, 5.1 surround	
2023	Who's Next: Artist: The Who; Release date: 15 September 2023; Original release date: 14 August 1971	Stereo, 5.1 surround, Atmos	
2023	The Big Express: Artist: XTC; Release date: 29 September 2023; Original release date: 15 October 1984	Stereo, 5.1 surround, Atmos	
2024	The Missing Piece: Artist: Gentle Giant; Release date: 29 March 2024; Original release date: 26 August 1977	Stereo, 5.1 surround, Atmos	
2024	Lament: Artist: Ultravox; Release date: 6 September 2024; Original release date: 6 April 1984	Stereo, 5.1 surround, Atmos	
2024	Bursting Out: Artist: Jethro Tull; Release date: 20 September 2024; Original release date: 22 September 1978	Stereo, 5.1 surround	
2025	Pink Floyd at Pompeii – MCMLXXII: Artist: Pink Floyd; Release date: 2 May 2025; Original release date: 2 September 1972	Stereo, 5.1 surround, Atmos	
2025	Living in the Past: Artist: Jethro Tull; Release date: 11 July 2025; Original release date: 23 June 1972	Stereo, 5.1 surround	
2025	Made in Japan: Artist: Deep Purple; Release date: 15 August 2025; Original release date: 8 December 1972	Stereo, 5.1 surround, Atmos	
2025	Blues for Allah: Artist: Grateful Death; Release date: 12 September 2025; Original release date: 1 September 1975	Stereo, 5.1 surround, Atmos	
2025	No Jacket Required: Artist: Phil Collins; Release date: 12 September 2025; Original release date: 18 February 1985	Stereo, 5.1 surround, Atmos	
2025	Welcome to the Pleasuredome: Artist: Frankie Goes to Hollywood; Release date: 31 October 2025; Original release date: 29 October 1984	Stereo, 5.1 surround, Atmos	
2025	Who Are You: Artist: The Who; Release date: 31 October 2025; Original release date: 18 August 1978	Stereo, 5.1 surround, Atmos	
2025	Black and Blue: Artist: The Rolling Stones; Release date: 14 November 2025; Original release date: 23 April 1976	Stereo, 5.1 surround, Atmos	
2025	Grace: Artist: Jeff Buckley; Release date: 22 December 2025; Original release date: 15 August 1994	5.1 surround, Atmos	
2026	On Parole: Artist: Motörhead; Release date: 17 April 2026; Original release date: 2 November 1979	Stereo, 5.1 surround, Atmos	
2026	Coming Up: Artist: Suede; Release date: 25 September 2026; Original release date: 2 September 1996	Stereo, 5.1 surround, Atmos	
2026	The Holy Bible: Artist: Manic Street Preachers; Release date: 23 October 2026; Original release date: 29 August 1994	Stereo, 5.1 surround, Atmos	
