= Warm Winter =

Studio album by Memories of Machines
- Released: May 2011
- Recorded: Spring 2006–autumn 2010
- Genre: Art rock; alternative rock; dream pop
- Length: 49:50
- Label: Mascot
- Producer: Tim Bowness, Giancarlo Erra

Professional ratings
Review scores
Source	Rating
Classic Rock	(favourable)
Drowned in Sound	5/10 stars
Rock Sins	(8.3/10)

Warm Winter is the debut album by art-rock duo Memories of Machines (a collaboration between No-Man singer Tim Bowness and Nosound multi-instrumentalist Giancarlo Erra. The album was released in 2011.

Warm Winter features a wide range of guest performers, including two leading members of the 1970s progressive rock movement (Robert Fripp, Peter Hammill) and several from its 1990s/2000s equivalent (Jim Matheos (of Fates Warning and OSI), Huxflux Nettermalm of Paatos, all current and several previous members of both Nosound and Henry Fool, and Porcupine Tree's Colin Edwin and Steven Wilson (the latter of whom is also Bowness' partner in No-Man). Other contributors to the album include Julianne Regan (All About Eve), Estonian jazz trumpeter Aleksei Saks and cellist Marianne de Chastelaine (Samuel Smiles, Heather Nova).

A different version of the song "Beautiful Songs You Should Know" appears on the 2008 No-Man album Schoolyard Ghosts (this album shares a title with another song on Warm Winter, which is itself closely related to the No-Man track "Mixtaped").

== Track listing ==
All songs by Tim Bowness/Giancarlo Erra unless otherwise noted.

1. New Memories of Machines – 1:31
2. Before We Fall – 5:12
3. Beautiful Songs You Should Know – 4:59
4. Warm Winter – 5:34
5. Lucky You, Lucky Me – 4:17
6. Change Me Once Again – 5:56
7. Something in Our Lives – 4:11
8. Lost and Found in the Digital World – 5:14 (Tim Bowness/Giancarlo Erra/Robert Fripp)
9. Schoolyard Ghosts – 5:32 (Tim Bowness)
10. At the Centre of It All – 7:26

== Personnel ==
=== Memories of Machines ===
- Tim Bowness – vocals, guitar on "Schoolyard Ghosts"
- Giancarlo Erra – guitars, keyboards, recording, engineering

=== Guest performers ===
- Steven Wilson – guitars & keyboards on "Lucky You, Lucky Me", additional recording & engineering, mixing
- Gabriele Savini – acoustic guitar on "Change Me Once Again"
- Jim Matheos – guitar atmospherics on "Something in Our Lives"
- Robert Fripp – guitar Soundscapes on "Lost and Found in the Digital World"
- Michael Bearpark – volume-swell guitar on "Schoolyard Ghosts"
- Peter Hammill – guitars on "At the Centre Of It All"
- Alessandro Luci – bass guitar on "Before We Fall", "Warm Winter" & "Change Me Once Again"
- Peter Chilvers – bass guitar on "Schoolyard Ghosts"
- Colin Edwin – double bass on "At the Centre Of It All"
- Paolo Martelacci – keyboards on "Before We Fall" & "Change Me Once Again"
- Stephen Bennett – electric piano & synthesizer solo on "Schoolyard Ghosts", additional recording & engineering
- Huxflux Nettermalm – drums on "Before We Fall" & "Warm Winter"
- Gigi Zito – drums on "Change Me Once Again"
- Andrew Booker – drums on "Schoolyard Ghosts"
- Aleksei Saks – trumpet on "Lost and Found in the Digital World"
- Myke Clifford – saxophone on "Schoolyard Ghosts"
- Marianne de Chastelaine – cello on "Beautiful Songs You Should Know" & "At the Centre Of It All"
- Julianne Regan – backing vocals on "Before We Fall" & "Change Me Once Again"
