= Airbridge (band) =

British progressive rock band

Airbridge is a British progressive rock band, based in Norwich, East Anglia. Initially active during the 1980s, the band spent a long period dormant but creative during the 1990s. Various attempts were made to revive Airbridge in the late 2000s before the band settled on a new three-piece lineup and finally released new material in 2013.

Various Airbridge members have gone on to play in LaHost, Henry Fool and the live lineup of No-Man.

== Initial career (1980–1983) ==
The initial lineup consisted of Lorenzo Bedini (guitar, keyboard, vocals), Edward Percival (guitar, keyboard, vocals), Sean Godfrey (bass, vocals) and David Beckett (drums). The band toured many of the same venues as groups such as Marillion and Pallas, including several supports and headliners at the Marquee. Bedini's songs featured a strong Barclay James Harvest influence, while Percival composed material in a more mainstream progressive vein with some pop influences.

The band's debut album Paradise Moves was released in 1983, following which the band augmented their lineup by adding Stephen J Bennett on keyboards. The band's next release was the "Words & Pictures" single, which was chosen as a Desert Island Discs favourite by the author Malcolm Bradbury.

In late 1983 Bedini and Bennett both left the band and were replaced by Geoff Chamberlain (guitars), The group recorded a second (unreleased) album, Beyond the Veil, before breaking up at the end of 1983.

== Post-breakup and subsequent bands ==
After his departure from Airbridge, Lorenzo Bedini would play in a 1960s covers band and run music workshops in a prison. He also played guitar for Arabella Rodriguez, and played on the soundtrack for the David Carradine film Detention.

Following the 1983 breakup of Airbridge, Stephen Bennett and Sean Godfrey formed LaHost, which included drummer Fudge Smith (who'd move on to Pendragon, and Mark Spencer (Twelfth Night & Galahad. Post-LaHost, Sean Godfrey formed the Sonic City Rocker Squad with David Donnelly who caused a brief and minor stir on both sides of the Atlantic. Bennett went on to form The Fire Thieves and collaborated with musicians including Lady Sara Rönneke, David Torn, Hugh Hopper and David Picking. He has also moved into film making (including narrative films and creating music videos for Tim Bowness/Peter Chilvers and No-Man) and technical journalism (writing about Logic music software for Sound on Sound and others, as well as books on the same subject for PC-Publishing). In 2000, he formed the band Henry Fool with Tim Bowness. As of 2008, he is the keyboard player in the live line-up of No-Man.

Edward Percival went on to play with various tribute bands, including The Dandy Highwaymen (New Romantics) and Fossil Fools (XTC). In May 2012, it was announced that he had formed a new band called Mellotronanism which had "reached the rehearsal stage" and was "unashamedly based in the textures of classic early 70s prog." The band would perform original material plus some of Percival's Airbridge songs and would feature two other members of The Dandy Highwaymen & Fossil Fools - Matt Bell (Bass and vocals) and Terry Arnett (Drums and vocals). Mellotronanism opened the second night of a charity gig in Bracknell, in aid of Great Ormond Street Hospital on 26 March 2016. Fossil Fools (from 2010), with the addition of Dan Farmer (Guitar, Keys and vocals) and Jake Crawford (Guitar and vocals) have grown more popular with audiences after playing at the XTC Convention of 2017 in Swindon, and subsequently dates in London and Swindon during 2018 to 2020. They also played Swindon and London in late 2021 and were to perform at the previously postponed XTC Convention of 2020, then scheduled for September 2022 but were unable to attend. Fossil Fools' last gigs were performed as "The Final Fling" in London at The Water Rats in October 2022 and at The Vic in Swindon on 22 November 2022, with the latter having XTC's Dave Gregory (musician) in attendance. He also witnessed their first show, as they were the warm up act for the band he was in at the time, Tin Spirits. Both he and Colin Moulding endorsed their efforts, and Andy Partridge and Terry Chambers acknowledged them.

== Reviving Airbridge (2008–present) ==
Throughout the 1990s Bedini and Godfrey maintained their connection, continuing to record and compose as Airbridge, but no recordings were ever released beyond the demo stage. During the late 2000s, several attempts were made to formally revive the band. Godfrey and Bedini would record material together in 2008 for an album called Quiet Sky which was never released. In 2009 the duo recruited singer Pavla Kristkova and Cryptic Clues member Mark Spencer (the latter also a former member of LaHost and Twelfth Night) to record a new album called Mythica. This album also remained unreleased (although some demo recordings were made available) and both Kristkova and Spencer left the project.

In 2010 Bedini and Godfrey recruited a former Airbridge live sound technician, Dave Dowdeswell-Allaway to play drums and acoustic guitar. Dowdeswell-Allaway also brought additional singing, songwriting and guitar skills to the band. The three-piece Airbridge made their live debut at The Crypt in Norwich during the summer of 2012, followed by concerts in Roccalbegna, Italy.

A new four-song Airbridge EP called Return (featuring songs composed by both Bedini and Dowdeswell-Allaway) was released on 12 July 2013.

Due to illness, Sean Godfrey retired from bass playing and live performance in early 2013. His place was taken by Milli Bedini for an Italian gig in the summer of 2013, and he was replaced by Matt Gamble as full-time bassist and backing vocalist towards the end of that year.

Performing existing Airbridge songs, Matt Gamble, Lorenzo Bedini and Dave Dowdeswell-Allaway performed at the Cambridge Rock Festival in August 2014. Following that, recording is planned for a full album to be released in 2015 with songs written by Bedini, Dowdeswell-Allaway, Gamble, and Godfrey.

== Personnel ==
=== Current ===
- Lorenzo Bedini - guitars, keyboards, vocals (1980-1983, 1990s-present)
- Matt Gamble - bass, vocals (2013–present)
- Dave Dowdeswell-Allaway - drums, acoustic guitars, piano, vocals (2010–present)

=== Previous ===
- Sean Godfrey - bass guitar, keyboards, vocals (1980-1983, 1993–2013)
- Edward Percival - guitar, keyboards, vocals (1980-1983)
- David Beckett - drums (1980-1983)
- Stephen J Bennett- keyboards (1983)
- Geoff Chamberlain - guitars (1983)
- Pavla Kristkova - vocals (2008)
- Mark Spencer - keyboards, vocals (2008)
