= Matt Stevens (musician) =

English rock musician

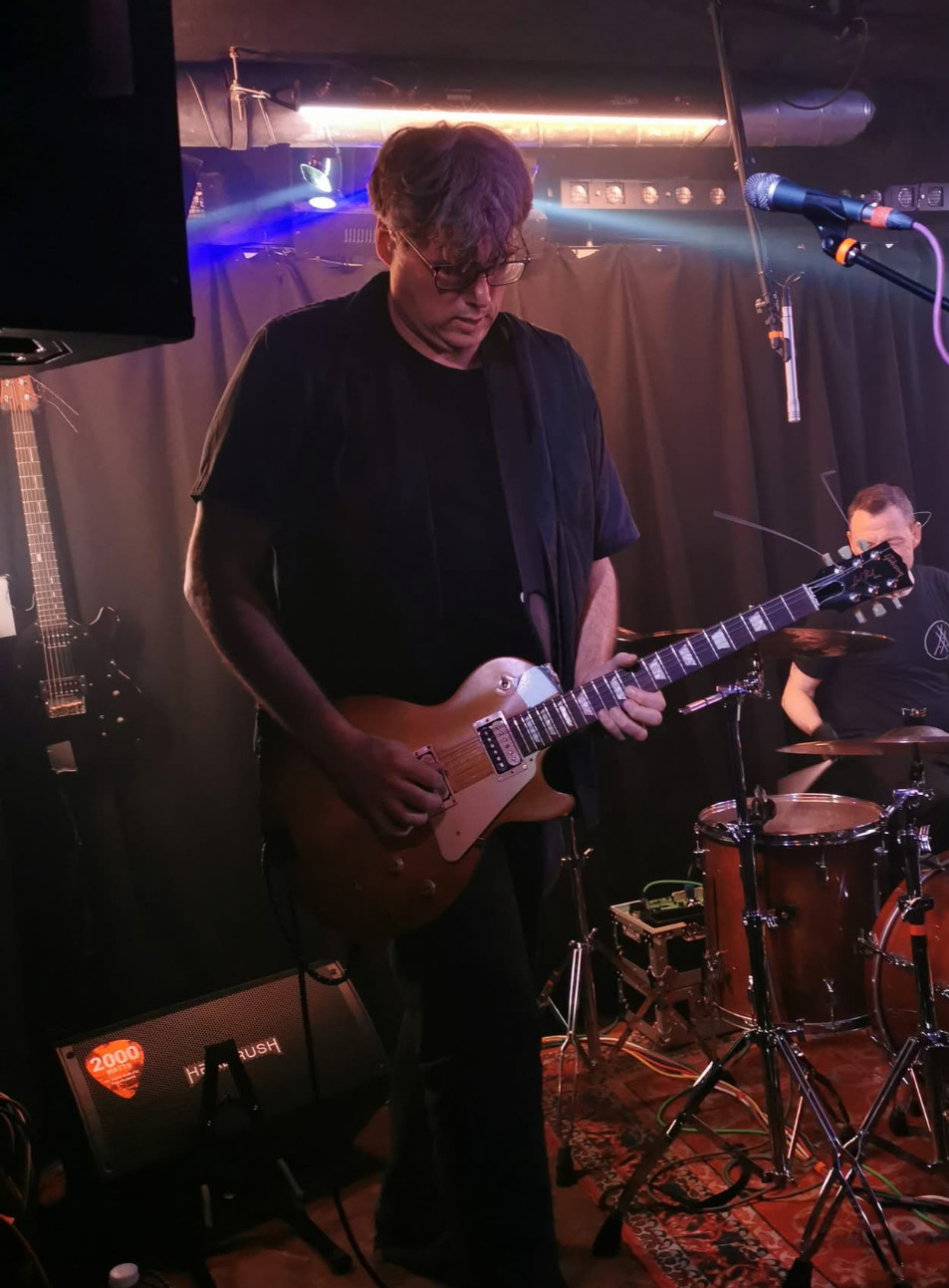

Background information
- Born: August 2, 1975 (age 51)
- Origin: Rushden, Northamptonshire, England
- Genres: Progressive rock, Post-rock, Instrumental rock
- Occupations: Musician, composer
- Instrument: Guitar
- Years active: 2008–present
- Labels: Acid Jazz Records, Bad Elephant Music, Burning Shed, Cherry Red Records, Esoteric Recordings, Spencer Park Music
- Member of: The Fierce and the Dead
- Website: fierceandthedead.com

Matt Stevens (born 1975) is an English rock guitarist and composer, co-founder of the band The Fierce and the Dead, and solo artist who has made 4 instrumental albums. Prog Magazine included him in their 100 Prog Icons and their 200 Greatest Prog Musicians.

Since 2022, he has been the guitarist in Tim Bowness's live band. He has also recorded and written with Judy Dyble for an album on Acid Jazz Records which featured in the UK Official Independent Album Breakers and Progressive Albums Charts. He was nominated for Breakthrough Artist at the 2014 Progressive Music Awards for his solo work.

== Early life ==
Stevens grew up in Rushden, Northamptonshire, England. He began playing guitar as a teenager, inspired by Guns N’ Roses and Iron Maiden, later influences include King Crimson, Mahavishnu Orchestra, Bad Brains, Radiohead, Portishead and Johnny Marr. He moved to London in the early 2000s and began performing instrumental solo gigs, using a loop pedal and an acoustic guitar.

== Career ==
=== Solo work ===
Stevens began releasing instrumental solo material in 2008, with his debut album Echo. He was profiled about the live looping technique he used to create the album in Acoustic Magazine. His second album, Ghost, was described by Prog Magazine in a 2011 article as “one of the unexpected highlights of last year”. Stevens performed a series of online concerts to promote the album, as noted in a feature in Goldmine Magazine.

His third record Relic was released in 2011, via Burning Shed. It received radio play from Gideon Coe on BBC 6 Music. Guitar Player Magazine profiled Stevens in its December 2011 issue, coinciding with the release of the album.

His 2014 album Lucid, released on Esoteric Recordings, a division of Cherry Red Records, featured guest performances from Pat Mastelotto, Charlie Cawood and Jem Godfrey. It was described by All About Jazz as "a wholesome progressive-rock soup". Prog Magazine compared it to Mogwai and Sonic Youth. Stevens appeared in the 2014 Prog Magazine Readers' Poll of top ten best guitarists. He played a solo set at Cambridge Rock Festival, the headliners were Wishbone Ash, Jorn and Mostly Autumn. In the same year Stevens wrote a regular column on live looping techniques for Acoustic Magazine.

In 2015 he completed a run of solo live looping UK gigs and toured with Steve Rothery, and supported Jon Gomm, alongside his work with The Fierce and the Dead.

He announced his retirement from solo live looping performance in 2016 to focus on work with The Fierce and the Dead and other collaborations after the release of the Archive live album via Bad Elephant Music.

Stevens continued to appear in the Prog magazine readers poll, placing in the Top Ten Best Guitarists in 2019 and 2023.

=== The Fierce and the Dead ===
In 2010, Stevens co-founded The Fierce and the Dead (TFATD), who play what Prog Magazine describe as a "fluid blend of post-, math- and prog rock". The band originated from a jam session for Stevens' Ghost album. The lineup features Stevens, alongside bassist Kevin Feazey, guitarist Steve Cleaton, and drummer Stuart Marshall. They have released 5 albums If It Carries on Like This We Are Moving to Morecambe (2011), Spooky Action (2013), The Euphoric (2018), News from the Invisible World (2023, their first to feature vocals) and Regional Theatre (2026).Guitar.com noted they had "cultivated a large following by using both traditional and modern means". Keyboard player Tom Hunt joined the band in 2024.

In 2018, MusicRadar published a profile of Stevens focusing on his work with the band and the equipment he used.

The Fierce and the Dead have appeared at festivals including ArcTanGent and Ramblin' Man Fair. The band have supported Hawkwind, and have been nominated for the Progressive Music Awards in 2013 and twice in 2018. They have played in the USA, Germany, The Netherlands, Italy and regularly in the UK.

=== Collaborations ===
Stevens was a guest on Shineback's Rise Up Forgotten, Return Destroyed album in 2013. He contributed to Gandalf’s Fist's 2014 concept album A Forest of Fey and their 2016 album A Clockwork Fable.

Between 2014 and 2017 Stevens played on Cosmograf's albums The Man Left In Space (with Gregory Spawton and Nick D'Virgilio), Capacitor(with Nick Beggs). and The Hay-Man Dreams.

In 2018 he recorded guitar parts for Judy Dyble's album Earth Is Sleeping, on Acid Jazz Records and co-wrote “She Now Owns a Heart of Stone" on the record. The album got into the Official UK Independent Album Breakers Chart and Progressive Albums Chart.

Since 2022 Stevens has been the guitarist in Tim Bowness's live band, initially working with Peter Chilvers. Later line ups of the band have featured Theo Travis,Andy Edwards, John Jowitt and Rob Groucott, playing a range of material including Bowness's work with Steven Wilson in No-Man.Andrew Booker replaced Edwards in the Tim Bowness band for the Prog The Forest Festival in 2024.

He has performed as the live guitarist for comic book artist Mark Buckingham, and with Andy Tillison and Theo Travis.

== Discography ==
=== Solo albums ===
- Echo (2008)
- Ghost (2010)
- Relic (2011)
- Lucid (2014)

=== Live Solo album ===
- Archive (2016)

=== With The Fierce and the Dead ===
- If It Carries on Like This We Are Moving to Morecambe (2011)
- Spooky Action (2013)
- Field Recordings (2017)
- The Euphoric (2018)
- Live USA 17 (2019) – UK Album Downloads Chart No. 44 on 17 October 2019
- Show Me Devon: Live At Kozfest '19 (2020)
- News from the Invisible World (2023)
- Live at Ramsgate Music Hall '24 (2024)
- Regional Theatre (2026)

=== Guest appearances ===
- Shineback - Rise Up Forgotten, Return Destroyed (2013)
- Cosmograf - The Man Left In Space (2013)
- Cosmograf - Capacitor (2014)
- Gandalf’s Fist – A Forest of Fey (2014)
- Gandalf's Fist – The Clockwork Fable (2016)
- Cosmograf - The Hay-Man Dreams (2017)
- Judy Dyble – Earth Is Sleeping (2018) - 10 UK Official Independent Album Breakers Chart, 16 UK Official Progressive Albums Chart 13/7/2018

== Awards and nominations (as a solo artist) ==
- 2014 - Breakthrough Artist (Progressive Music Awards – nominated).
- 2014 - Prog Magazine – Top Ten Best Guitarists 2014 Readers Poll
- 2019 - Prog Magazine - 100 Prog Icons
- 2019 - Prog Magazine - Top Ten Best Guitarists 2019 Readers Poll
- 2019 - Prog Magazine – Top Ten People Of The Year 2019 Readers Poll
- 2020 - Prog Magazine – 200 Greatest Prog Musicians
- 2023 - Prog Magazine – Top Ten Best Guitarists 2023 Readers Poll

== Personal life ==
In 2018, Stevens underwent cancer treatment, which he discussed publicly in 2023 in an interview in Prog Magazine.

Notable fans of Stevens' music include the actor Mark Benton, and comic book artist Mark Buckingham.
