= Acoustic (magazine) =

Acoustic Magazine
- Staff writers: Pierre Bensusan; Paul Brett; Raymond Burley; Doyle Dykes; Julie Ellison; Chris Gibbons; Gordon Giltrap
- Frequency: Monthly
- Founded: 2004
- Company: Blaze Publishing Ltd.
- Country: Great Britain
- Website: www.acousticmagazine.com

Acoustic Magazine is a British glossy monthly publication that deals only in acoustic music.

== History and profile ==
Acoustic was cofounded by Hugo Montgomery-Swan, Mark Tucker and Steve Harvey in 2004. Harvey edited the first twenty issues of the magazine, which is part of Blaze Publishing Ltd..

Originally bi-monthly, it is now a monthly publication and carries reviews, features, lessons, vintage guitar advice and all manner of items to do with this genre. Columnists include Pierre Bensusan, Maartin Allcock, Doyle Dykes, Chris Gibbons, Kevin Harding, Simon Mayor, Gordon Giltrap, Matt Stevens (of The Fierce and the Dead) and Julie Ellison.
