= Stupid Things That Mean the World =

Studio album by Tim Bowness
- Released: 17 July 2015
- Recorded: 2014–2015
- Genre: Art rock, progressive rock
- Length: 59.59
- Label: InsideOut Music

Tim Bowness chronology
Abandoned Dancehall Dreams (2014)	Stupid Things That Mean the World (2015)

Stupid Things That Mean the World is Tim Bowness's third solo album, released on 17 July 2015 by Inside Out Music. Produced by Bowness and mixed by Bruce Soord, collaborators included Peter Hammill, Colin Edwin, Phil Manzanera and David Rhodes.

The album reached No. 10 in both the official UK Rock and UK Vinyl charts, and No. 1 in Prog magazine's July 2015 and August 2015 charts. In September 2015, Stupid Things That Mean the World was No. 9 in the first ever official UK Progressive chart.

The album appeared in Dave Thompson's top releases of the year in Goldmine and at No. 14 in Prog magazine's critic's chart for 2015 (Issue 62).

== Track listing ==
(all songs by Tim Bowness unless otherwise indicated)

=== Single CD/vinyl edition ===
1. The Great Electric Teenage Dream (3.58) (Stephen James Bennett/Tim Bowness)
2. Sing To Me (5.46) (Tim Bowness/Steven Wilson)
3. Where You've Always Been (4.07) (Tim Bowness/Phil Manzanera)
4. Stupid Things That Mean The World (3.05)
5. Know That You Were Loved (6.44)
6. Press Reset (3.54)
7. All These Escapes (3.06) (Tim Bowness/Brian Hulse)
8. Everything You're Not (3.40)
9. Everything But You (1.12)
10. Soft William (1.40)
11. At The End of the Holiday (4.58) (Tim Bowness/Andrew Keeling)

=== 2-CD limited-edition media book ===
Disc 1

1. The Great Electric Teenage Dream (3.58) (Stephen James Bennett/Tim Bowness)
2. Sing To Me (5.46) (Tim Bowness/Steven Wilson)
3. Where You've Always Been (4.07) (Tim Bowness/Phil Manzanera)
4. Stupid Things That Mean The World (3.05)
5. Know That You Were Loved (6.44)
6. Press Reset (3.54)
7. All These Escapes (3.06) (Tim Bowness/Brian Hulse)
8. Everything You're Not (3.40)
9. Everything But You (1.12)
10. Soft William (1.40)
11. At The End of the Holiday (4.58) (Tim Bowness/Andrew Keeling)

Disc 2

1. Stupid Things That Mean The World (Alternate) (Nick Magnus mix) (3.09)
2. Best Boy Electric (Sing To Me) (1994 No-Man demo) (Steven Wilson mix) (1.58) (Tim Bowness/Steven Wilson)
3. Know That You Were Loved (Alternate, David Rhodes 'electric version') (Stephen Bennett mix) (6.29)
4. I Still Miss You (Stupid Things That Mean The World, UXB 'Ambient' Mix) (6.13)

== Charts ==
Chart (2015)	Position
UK Rock Albums chart	10
UK Top 100 Physical Sales	75
UK Vinyl chart	10
UK Progressive Albums chart	9

== Personnel ==
- Tim Bowness – vocals, keyboards, guitar, programming

With:

- Stephen James Bennett – keyboards, programming
- Michael Bearpark - guitars
- Andrew Keeling - string arrangements, acoustic guitars ('At The End of the Holiday')
- Colin Edwin – fretless bass, double bass
- Andrew Booker – drums
- Pat Mastelotto – drums
- Charlotte Dowling - violin ensemble
- Anna Phoebe – violin
- Bruce Soord - guitar, bass, programming
- Peter Hammill - slide guitar, vocals
- Phil Manzanera - guitar, vocals, keyboards
- David Rhodes - guitar, backing vocals
- Rhys Marsh - pedal steel guitar
