= Flame (Richard Barbieri and Tim Bowness album) =

Studio album by Richard Barbieri and Tim Bowness
- Released: 29 August 1994
- Recorded: Autumn 1993 and Winter 1993/1994 at the Orange Asylum
- Genre: Post rock, minimalism, trance, progressive rock
- Length: 45:37
- Label: One Little Indian Records
- Producer: Richard Barbieri, Tim Bowness

Professional ratings
Review scores
Source	Rating
allmusic	4/5 stars

"Flame" is the only album recorded by the duo of singer/lyricist Tim Bowness (No-Man) and keyboard player Richard Barbieri (Porcupine Tree), released in 1994.

The two men met when Tim Bowness and Steven Wilson (also of Porcupine Tree) invited Richard Barbieri (along with Mick Karn and Steve Jansen) to join the live line-up of Bowness and Wilsons's band No-Man. Apart from Wilson, Karn and Jansen, "Flame" also features appearances by drummers Chris Maitland and Gavin Harrison (formerly and currently of Porcupine Tree respectively). Also appearing is guitarist Michael Bearpark, from Bowness's Samuel Smiles band.

The title track of the album is a reworked version (with lyrics and vocal melody written by Bowness) of a Barbieri-penned instrumental called "Long Tales, Tall Shadows", which appeared on the Jansen and Barbieri 1991 album Stories Across Borders. In the same vein, "Song of Love and Everything" heavily draws from "Lumen", another song from that same album that was written by Jansen and Barbieri.

Portions of the recording sessions ran parallel to those of No-Man's Flowermouth album (released two months previously, also on One Little Indian). Wire Magazine, in conjunction with the label, distributed a four-track sampler CD with their July 1994 issue which included two tracks from each release.

== Track listing ==
No.	Title	Length
1.	"A Night In Heaven"	5:49
2.	"Song Of Love And Everything (part 1)"	3:13
3.	"Song Of Love And Everything (part 2)"	3:14
4.	"Brightest Blue"	4:36
5.	"Flame"	5:24
6.	"Trash Talk"	4:40
7.	"Time Flown"	6:01
8.	"Torch Dance"	8:31
9.	"Feel"	4:09

== Song credits ==
- A Night In Heaven (Barbieri/Bowness)
  - Steve Jansen - drum programming
  - Mick Karn - saxophone
  - Richard Barbieri - keyboards, synthesisers, additional drum programming
  - Tim Bowness - vocal
- Song Of Love And Everything (part I & II) (Jansen/Barbieri/Bowness)
  - Steve Jansen - drum programming, guitar, hand percussion, bass synthetiser
  - Mick Karn - bass guitar
  - Steven Wilson - guitar
  - Richard Barbieri - keyboards, synthesisers
  - Tim Bowness - vocal
- Brightest Blue (Bowness)
  - Chris Maitland - drum kit
  - Danny Thompson - acoustic bass
  - Michael Bearpark - guitar
  - Richard Barbieri - keyboards, synthesisers
  - Tim Bowness - vocal
- Flame (Barbieri/Bowness)
  - Gavin Harrison - drum kit
  - Steve Jansen - drum programming
  - Mick Karn - bass guitar
  - Steven Wilson - guitar
  - Richard Barbieri - keyboards, synthesisers
  - Tim Bowness - vocal
- Trash Talk (Jansen/Barbieri/Bowness)
  - Steve Jansen - drum programming
  - Richard Barbieri - keyboards, synthesisers
  - Tim Bowness - vocal
- Time Flown (Barbieri/Bowness)
  - Gavin Harrison - drum programming
  - Mick Karn - saxophone
  - Richard Barbieri - keyboards, synthesisers
  - Tim Bowness - vocal
- Torch Dance (Barbieri)
  - Steve Jansen - drum programming
  - Michael Bearpark - guitars
  - Richard Barbieri - keyboards, drum programming, treatments
- Feel (Barbieri/Bowness)
  - Steve Jansen - drum programming, bass synthesisers
  - Michael Bearpark - guitar
  - Richard Barbieri - keyboards, synthesisers
  - Tim Bowness - vocal
