= Abandoned Dancehall Dreams =

Studio album by Tim Bowness
- Released: 23 June 2014
- Recorded: 2013–2014
- Genre: Art rock, progressive rock, dream pop, chamber pop, art pop
- Length: 44:04
- Label: InsideOut Music

Tim Bowness chronology
My Hotel Year (2004)	Abandoned Dancehall Dreams (2014)	Stupid Things That Mean The World (2015)

Abandoned Dancehall Dreams is the second solo studio album by the English singer-songwriter Tim Bowness. It was originally released on 23 June 2014 by the label InsideOut Music.

== Background ==
When scheduling conflicts postponed an intended 2014 album by Bowness' main band No-Man, Bowness collated the songs written for that album and reworked them for a solo record. Many of the elements of the original No-Man project remained on the finished album, with Bowness’ No-Man partner Steven Wilson remaining as sound mixer and sounding board (as well as making occasional instrumental contributions) and with the entire No-Man live band making substantial contributions across the record.

Bowness wrote six songs for the project (two of which ended up on the bonus disc) and co-wrote two with Henry Fool and No-Man live keyboardist Stephen James Bennett. The song 'Waterfoot' resulted from a collaboration with contemporary composer/arranger Andrew Keeling, while 'Songs of Distant Summers' was co-written with Stuart Laws. The song 'Beaten By Love' had previously appeared on No-Man's live album Love And Endings in 2012.

Additional performers on the album included King Crimson drummer Pat Mastelotto, Porcupine Tree bassist Colin Edwin and Trans-Siberian Orchestra violinist Anna Phoebe.

The download and double CD editions of the album included remixes by Richard Barbieri, Grasscut and UXB as well as versions of the album’s songs recorded by the No-Man live band (minus Wilson).

Abandoned Dancehall Dreams came out to some of the best reviews of Bowness' career. Receiving positive endorsements from Prog and Classic Rock, the album reached #18 in the official UK Rock chart and #1 in Prog magazine's July 2014 and August 2014 charts. The album finished at #10 in the overall Prog chart for 2014 and #16 in the magazine's critic's chart for the year (both in Issue 52, January 2015).

The album was also subject to a highly positive Extended Analysis on the award-winning All About Jazz site

The distinctive cover artwork was by Jarrod Gosling (I Monster). Music videos were made for The Warm Up Man Forever, Smiler At 52 and Singing For You (Dancing For You, UXB mix).

== Track listing ==
(all songs by Tim Bowness unless otherwise indicated)

=== Single-CD/vinyl edition ===
1. The Warm-Up Man Forever (4.06)
2. Smiler At 50 (8.19) (Stephen James Bennett/Tim Bowness)
3. Songs Of Distant Summers (5.02) (Tim Bowness/Stuart Laws)
4. Waterfoot (4.14) (Tim Bowness/Andrew Keeling)
5. Dancing For You (5.59) (Stephen James Bennett/Tim Bowness)
6. Smiler At 52 (4.05)
7. I Fought Against the South (8.51)
8. Beaten By Love (3.28)

=== 2-CD limited-edition media book ===
Disc 1

Same as single-CD edition above.

Disc 2

1. There Were Days (Smiler At 52, Grasscut mix) (4.53)
2. Sounds of Distant Summers (Songs of Distant Summers, Richard Barbieri mix) (5.31) (Tim Bowness/Stuart Laws)
3. Singing For You (Dancing For You, UXB mix) (4.42) (Stephen James Bennett/Tim Bowness)
4. Abandoned Dancehall Dream (2.25)
5. The Sweetest Bitter Pill (3.51)
6. The Warm-Up Man Forever (band version) (4.15)
7. Songs of Distant Summers Part 1 (band version) (4.55) (Tim Bowness/Stuart Laws)
8. Songs of Distant Summers Part 2 (band version) (3.59) (Tim Bowness/Stuart Laws)

=== Download edition ===
1. The Warm-Up Man Forever (4.06)
2. Smiler At 50 (8.19) (Stephen Bennett/Tim Bowness)
3. Songs Of Distant Summers (5.02) (Tim Bowness/Stuart Laws)
4. Waterfoot (4.14)
5. Dancing For You (5.59) (Stephen Bennett/Tim Bowness)
6. Smiler At 52 (4.05)
7. I Fought Against The South (8.51)
8. Beaten By Love (3.28)
9. There Were Days (Smiler At 52, Grasscut mix) (4.53)
10. Sounds Of Distant Summers (Songs Of Distant Summers, Richard Barbieri mix) (5.31) (Tim Bowness/Stuart Laws)
11. Singing For You (Dancing For You, UXB mix) (4.42) (Stephen Bennett/Tim Bowness)

== Personnel ==
- Tim Bowness – vocals, additional Mellotron/piano /keyboards/drum programming/guitar
- Stephen James Bennett – keyboards, synthesizers, Mellotron, upright & electric pianos, drum programming, "The Spitfire Orchestra" (Smiler at 50)
- Michael Bearpark - guitars
- Andrew Keeling - string arrangements, acoustic guitars/bass guitar/organ/percussion ('Waterfoot'), flutes ('I Fought Against the South')
- Stuart Laws – piano & synth pads/Taurus bass pedals/atmospherics/percussion ('Songs of Distant Summers')
- Pete Morgan – bass guitar
- Colin Edwin – bass guitar, double bass
- Pat Mastelotto – drums
- Andrew Booker – drums
- Charlotte Dowling - violin ensemble
- Anna Phoebe – violin
- Steve Bingham – violin
- Steven Wilson – additional drum programming & guitar
- Eliza Legzedina, Matt Ankers – backing vocals (Dancing For You)
