= Bloom (software) =

Generative music application for iOS

- Developers: Brian Eno, Peter Chilvers
- Initial release: October 7, 2008
- Stable release: 2023 (v3.2)
- Platform: iOS Android
- Type: Music application

Bloom is a generative music application for iOS created by Brian Eno and Peter Chilvers. The software allows for the creation of simple ambient tracks through touch-screen controls and a variety of settings, with created songs looping parts as opposed to a traditional track runtime. It is bare-bones compared to other music programs, as no instruments, melodies or audio files can be added to compositions.

Eno and Chilvers have since released two related apps; Trope in 2009 and Scape in 2012.

== Features ==
The main functionality of Bloom is derived from the touchscreen. When the screen is pressed, a low drone is generated, which can be added upon through extra taps, creating extra tones represented by circles. The app allows you to customize the "mood" of your song with 12 different mood settings, changing the way the tones sound. These sounds loop, and will be managed by the app itself if the user goes idle. The delay of each sound can be manually adjusted, and shaking the device will clear all shapes on the screen, letting users restart the process.

== Reception ==
The response to Bloom was overwhelmingly positive. In a review by Ben Marshall of The Guardian, he compares it to the work of French composer Erik Satie, quipping "should Bloom be regarded as a new Brian Eno album (because it certainly sounds like one), a clever but singularly pointless computer application, or a massive Satie-like joke at the expense of its listeners?" Otherwise, he adds that the application is "hypnotic and ludicrously addictive." Damon Krukowski of Artforum stated that the application made him feel like "the Terry Riley of the iPhone" and "led to an even greater purge of my CD collection."

== Bloom: 10 Worlds ==
For the application's 10th anniversary, Eno and Chilvers released Bloom: 10 Worlds, described as a "reimagining" of the original. The software starts the user out in a replica of the original app, and from there they can unlock later worlds, with a larger variety of sounds and shapes. It contains all the original features of the 2008 release, in addition to a simplified interface for an easier workflow. Along with this remake, the original version of Bloom was made available for Android devices.
