= Tony Harn =

- Born: Tony Harn
- Genres: Jazz, Progressive Rock, Fusion, Art Rock, Experimental, Ambient, Soundscape, Instrumental
- Occupation: Musician
- Instruments: Guitars, Bass Guitar, Keyboards, Percussion
- Years active: 1980s–present
- Label: self-released

Tony Harn is a jazz and progressive rock musician from Cheshire, UK. A multi-instrumentalist, predominantly guitar but also bass guitar, keyboards and percussion. One half of the jazz guitar duo Mere Morsels with Nick Caldwell. Founder of the prog rock band Nerve Toy. Solo artist and occasional collaborator.

== Discography ==
=== Solo ===
- From the Inside (1998, self-released)
- Lifebox (1999, self-released)
- Moving Moons (2001, self-released, distributed by Burning Shed)
- Revealed in Black and White (2006, self-released, distributed by Burning Shed)
- Loops (2008, self-released, distributed by Burning Shed)
- The Glass Hour (2025, self-released, distributed by bandcamp)
- Upcycling EP (2025, self-released, distributed by bandcamp)

=== with Nerve Toy ===
- The Hard Cell (2011, self-released, distributed by Burning Shed)
- Accidental BBQ (2016, self-released, distributed by Burning Shed)
- Intentional Buffet EP (2025, self-released, distributed by bandcamp)
- EP 2 (2025, self-released, distributed by bandcamp)
- Platform Punk (2026, self-released, distributed by bandcamp and elasticstage)

=== Guest appearances ===
- Tim Bowness & Samuel Smiles - World of Bright Futures (1999, Hidden Art) (co-write / guitars / bass / organ on Red Eye Removal)
