= Memories of Machines =

British musical group

- Origin: England, Italy
- Genres: Art rock; alternative rock; dream pop
- Years active: 2006–present
- Labels: Mascot
- Members: Tim Bowness; Giancarlo Erra
- Website: memoriesofmachines.com

Memories of Machines is a band formed by Tim Bowness (No-Man, Henry Fool) and Giancarlo Erra (Nosound) in April 2006.

== History ==
Memories of Machines emerged as a full project following Bowness' first collaborations with Nosound during the mid-2000s. This began with a song called "Someone Starts to Fade Away" which eventually appeared on Nosound's album Lightdark). A second song, "Change Me Once Again", emerged from sessions for Bowness' guest appearance with Nosound in Rome in 2006 and prompted Bowness and Erra to embark on a full album collaboration.).

Further recordings followed in parallel with Erra's work on Lightdark and Bowness' work on the No-Man album Schoolyard Ghosts. Several songs originally submitted for Schoolyard Ghosts were eventually recorded by Memories of Machines (one particular track, "Beautiful Songs You Should Know", was also recorded and released by both bands in two separate versions). Other musicians contributed to the sessions as they developed, including all members of Nosound and all members of Bowness' progressive rock band Henry Fool (several of whom also played in the No-Man live band). Other collaborators included Steven Wilson, Julianne Regan, Jim Matheos and Peter Hammill (the latter contributing guitar parts rather than the vocals he might have been expected to provide). Robert Fripp also contributed some ambient Soundscapes, which Bowness and Erra subsequently used as the foundations for the song "Lost and Found in the Digital World".

Memories of Machines released their debut album, Warm Winter, in April 2011 on the Mascot Records label.

== Discography ==
=== Studio albums ===
- Warm Winter (2011)
