= Flowers at the Scene =

Studio album by Tim Bowness
- Released: 1 March 2019
- Length: 42:50
- Label: Inside Out Music

Tim Bowness chronology
Lost in the Ghost Light (2017)	Flowers at the Scene (2019)	Late Night Laments (2020)

Professional ratings
Aggregate scores
Source	Rating
Metacritic	78/100
Review scores
Source	Rating
PopMatters	7/10
Sputnikmusic	4/5 stars

Flowers at the Scene is the fifth studio album by English singer-songwriter Tim Bowness. It was released on 1 March 2019 on Inside Out Music / Sony.

The album garnered extremely positive reviews from the rock media in Britain and Europe, as well as in more mainstream publications such as The Daily Express, Mojo and Classic Pop.

Produced by Tim Bowness with Steven Wilson - as No-Man - and Brian Hulse, the album featured guest appearances from Peter Hammill, Kevin Godley, Andy Partridge, Jim Matheos, David Longdon, Colin Edwin, Dylan Howe and others.

Flowers At The Scene reached No.5 in both the official UK Rock and UK Progressive charts, No.24 in the official UK Vinyl chart, No.38 in the official UK Physical sales chart, and No.65 in the official Scottish albums chart.

== Track listing ==
No.	Title	Length
1.	"I Go Deeper"	4:15
2.	"The Train That Pulled Away"	4:04
3.	"Rainmark" (featuring Jim Matheos)	4:15
4.	"Not Married Anymore" (featuring Dylan Howe)	3:30
5.	"Flowers at the Scene" (featuring Jim Matheos)	3:04
6.	"It's the World" (featuring Peter Hammill, Jim Matheos and Steven Wilson)	3:03
7.	"Borderline" (featuring Dylan Howe and David Longdon)	3:45
8.	"Ghostlike"	5:08
9.	"The War On Me"	3:47
10.	"Killing to Survive" (featuring Peter Hammill)	3:59
11.	"What Lies Here" (featuring Kevin Godley and Andy Partridge)	4:00

== Charts ==
Chart (2019)	Peak position
UK Rock Albums	5
UK Top 100 Physical Albums	38
UK Vinyl Albums	24
UK Progressive Albums	5
Official Scottish Albums Top 100	65
