= Samuel Smiles (band) =

English ambient-folk band

Samuel Smiles (frequently known as Tim Bowness/Samuel Smiles, the name to which all of their albums were attributed) were an intermittently active English ambient-folk band. Their best-known lineup featured singer Tim Bowness of the band No-Man.

== Band history ==
During the mid-1980s, Michael Bearpark had played guitar for two Warrington art rock groups, After The Stranger and Plenty, both of which also featured future No-Man singer Tim Bowness. Bearpark subsequently moved south to study chemistry at King's College, London, where he won the Samuel Smiles Award For Scientific Genius (named after the Scottish writer, social reformer and self-help advocate). Bearpark had stayed in touch with Bowness, who suggested that "Samuel Smiles" might be a good band name.

The original lineup of Samuel Smiles was formed in Cambridge in 1990 by Bearpark (electric guitar), Charles Fernyhough (acoustic guitar), Grainne McAlonan (vocals) and Phil Unwin (double bass) - multi-instrumentalist Peter Chilvers joined on piano shortly afterwards. The band went through a number of changes in style (including folk and country). Bowness (by then singing with No-Man and making an impact within the music industry) produced the first Samuel Smiles demo tape in early 1991, following which the band parted company with McAlonan and Unwin. Fernyhough became an occasional contributor who continued to play, write and record with the remaining members (on and off) until January 1995 - he would later become a celebrated child psychologist.

In June 1991, Bearpark and Chilvers teamed up with Bowness to form a voice/guitar/piano trio, initially under the new name of Strapless. The band rapport was so instant that they performed their first live date on the day of their first rehearsal, and went into Liverpool's Amazon Studios (now Parr Street Studios) to record a live album barely three weeks later. These early sessions were eventually released on the Burning Shed label as Live Archive One. Reverting to the name Samuel Smiles, the band continued sporadically to record and perform over the next decade, playing a BBC radio session in 1992 and performing occasional support slots to musicians such as Holly Penfield in 1995. In 1997, Bearpark, Bowness and Chilvers added cellist Marianne De Chastelaine (formerly with The Wise Wound and Heather Nova) to the lineup. This quartet played several concerts and made a number of recordings engineered by David Kosten.

A subsequent version of the band, with De Chastelaine replaced by Myke Clifford (saxophone, flute and percussion) recorded the 1999 studio album World of Bright Futures which featured guest appearances by Porcupine Tree's Steven Wilson and Colin Edwin plus Warringtonian guitarist Tony Harn). A live album, The Way We Used To Live, followed the next year (and was later reissued in an expanded version on Burning Shed as Live Archive Two). Samuel Smiles performed regularly throughout 1999 and 2000 including support slots with Porcupine Tree, Marillion and Roy Harper but ground to a halt after that.

== Post-career and related projects ==
The members of Samuel Smiles retained their personal and professional friendships, and would continue to collaborate on other projects.

- Some of the band's style and songs were carried on into the subsequent Tim Bowness/Peter Chilvers duo project, which released the California. Norfolk album in 2002.
- In 2000, Bowness (singing and playing guitar) and Chilvers (playing bass guitar and keyboards) formed the progressive rock band Henry Fool with former LaHost keyboard player Stephen Bennett: Bearpark subsequently joined as guitarist, with additional saxophone contributions from Clifford.
- Between 1998 and 2001, Bearpark and Bowness played together in Darkroom, with occasional contributions from Chilvers on bass guitar.
- Bearpark would join Bowness and Steven Wilson in the live line-up of No-Man in 2006 (with Chilvers playing piano for one concert).

== Developments and reconnections ==
Samuel Smiles acted as an incubator for several songs which subsequently travelled to other projects. Aside from the Tim Bowness/Peter Chilvers duo project (which continued to play the Samuel Smiles songs "Also Out Of Air", "Dreaming Of Babylon", and "Sorry Looking Soldier"), both "Flame" and "Brightest Blue" were revived for the Richard Barbieri/Tim Bowness album Flame. "Walker" was re-recorded by No-Man and eventually released as an archive track on their All The Blue Changes anthology.

Samuel Smiles also recycled an old song from a previous Bearpark and Bowness band, Plenty ("Life Is Elsewhere") and covered No-Man's "Watching Over Me" on their debut album.

In 2008, Bearpark reunited with Charles Fernyhough in the rock band Aimless Mules; and Marianne De Chastelaine was reunited with Tim Bowness in 2008 when she added cello to the No-Man album Schoolyard Ghosts.

== Discography ==
- World of Bright Futures - (Hidden Art (hi-art 3), 1999)
- The Way We Used to Live - (Hidden Art (hi-art 7), 2000)
- Live Archive One - (Burning Shed, 2000) CD-R
- Live Archive Two - (Burning Shed, 2000) CD-R
