= Stephen James Bennett =

British musician

Stephen (James) Bennett (also known as Stephen Bennett) is an English musician, writer and film maker from Skelmersdale, Lancashire. He sings, plays various keyboards, drums and guitar. He first came to public attention in the band LaHost in the 1980s as part of the New wave of progressive rock who had headlined at the Marquee Club in London. He was interviewed about his part in the movement for Andrew Wild's books 'A Mirror Of Dreams – The Progressive Rock Revival 1981 To 1983' and 'A Playground Of Broken Hearts – The Progressive Rock Revival 1984 To 1989'

Since the Lahost split, Bennett has pursued music careers with his own band The Fire Thieves, and worked with Tim Bowness and the band Henry Fool. He also sang and played keyboards on two of The Opium Cartel albums. He plays keyboards in No-Man with Steven Wilson and Tim Bowness. His latest band is Galasphere 347, an Anglo-Scandinavian project.

His 2014 collaboration with Tim Bowness, Abandoned Dancehall Dreams reached number 18 in the UK Rock Chart. A co-composed track from the album, Smiler at 50, was nominated for a Prog magazine award in 2014.

Another collaboration with Tim Bowness, Stupid things that mean the world reached number 10 in the UK Rock Chart.

Bennett co-composed the majority of the songs on Tim Bowness' 2017 album, Lost in the Ghost light as well as playing keyboards, guitar, editing, recording and preparing material for mixing by Steven Wilson. The album and its companion EP, Songs from the Ghost Light both charted in the UK in 2017. Lost In The Ghost Light reached No.5 in the official UK Rock chart, No.8 in the official UK progressive chart and won "Album Cover of the Year" at the 2017 Progressive Music Awards.

In 2018, Bennett played on the album The Age of Insanity by Twelfth Night's Clive Mitten.

Bennett is singer/guitarist/keyboard player and composer (with Ketil Vestrum Einarsen) in the band Galasphere 347. Their eponymous debut was released on Karisma records in July 2018 followed by the sophomore album, the syntax of things, in February 2026 on Chaos Studios Records.

Bennett has also collaborated with Lady Sara Rönneke, David Torn, Hugh Hopper and David Picking. He has made music videos for Tim Bowness, and Peter Chilvers and No-Man and has completed one narrative short film, The Perfect Number.

He has written about Apple's Logic Pro Digital Audio Workstation software for Sound on Sound, amongst others, as well as several books on music technology for PC-Publishing. He writes for Audiomedia, Tape-op, Pro sound news and Electronic sound magazines.

== Select discography ==
- LaHost 'Erotic Antiques' (UGUM MSI 1992)
- The Fire Thieves 'Slow dancing in the big city' (Chaos Studios 1991)
- The Fire Thieves 'Sweet' (Chaos Studios 1993)
- The Fire Thieves 'Clarity' (Chaos Studios 1997)
- SplatterCell (David Torn) 'Remiksis Ah' (CellDivide 200)
- henry fool 'henry fool' (K-Scope 2001)
- henry fool 'Pills in the Afternoon' (Piotr Kosinski compilation 2002)
- No-Man Together We're Stranger (Snapper 2003) – Director of the video of 'Things I want to tell you' included on the 5:1 re-release, 2007
- Rhinoceros Tiny Ghosts (Burning Shed 2003)
- Tim Bowness My Hotel Year' (One Little Indian 2004)
- Played keyboards on Sunsailor - Aerodrome from A Worldwide Tribute to Eddie Jobson by Various artists (2006)
- No-Man Schoolyard Ghosts (K-Scope 2008)
- The Fire Thieves Back to Stereo (Chaos 2009)
- No-Man Love and Endings (K-Scope 2011)
- Henry Fool Men Singing (K-Scope 2014)
- The Opium Cartel Night Blooms (Termo Records 2009)
- The Opium Cartel Ardor (Termo Records 2014)
- Tim Bowness Abandoned Dancehall Dreams (Inside Out Music 2015)
- Tim Bowness Stupid Things That Mean The World (Inside Out Music 2016)
- Tim Bowness Lost in the Ghost Light (Inside Out Music 2017)
- Tim Bowness Songs from the Ghost Light (Burning shed 2017) No. 39 highest position in the Official Independent Albums Chart Top 50 and No. 20 in the Official Rock and metal Album charts August 2018
- Galasphere 347 Eponymous. (Karisma Records 2018)
- C-Live collective This City is London (Bumnote 2018)
- Galasphere 347 the syntax of things. (Chaos Studios 2026)
