= Isolated Atoms =

British rock band

Isolated Atoms were an English rock band from the Black Country, in the Midlands. The band played shows nationally and in the US and supported The Charlatans, Simple Minds, The Answer and Blackberry Smoke.

== Members ==
The band consisted of Grant Leon Ashman (Vocals), Mark Neat (Guitar), David Davies (Bass Guitar) and Jake Yang Osei-Tutu (Drums)

== History ==
During May and June 2011 Isolated Atoms visited Los Angeles where they performed at the Whisky a Go Go on Sunset Strip and various other California music venues.

July 2011 saw Isolated Atoms on the cover of US rock publication All Access. where they were described as "the next British invasion".

The band had regular praise in Classic Rock, Kerrang!, on BBC Music Introducing and in various other national UK publications.

On 9 July 2014, the band announced on their Facebook page that they were "calling it a day, and going their separate ways".
