= Doyle Dykes =

American singer-songwriter (born 1954)

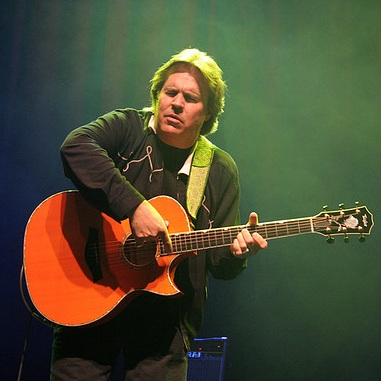
- Dykes, April 2006

Background information
- Born: 23 May 1954 (age 71); Jacksonville, Florida
- Genres: Country, folk, blues, Christian
- Occupations: Musician, songwriter, minister
- Instrument: Guitar
- Website: Official website

Doyle Dykes (born May 23, 1954) is an American country acoustic guitarist from Jacksonville, Florida. Cited along with guitarists such as Chet Atkins and Tommy Emmanuel as one of the best fingerstyle guitarists in the world, he is also known for his capability of playing proficiently with a wide range of different guitar tunings.

Dykes is influenced by a wide variety of musical styles and musicians, from Chet Atkins, Jerry Reed, and Duane Eddy, to the Beatles and U2. Some of his best-known works and interpretations are "Wabash Cannonball", "Country Fried Pickin'", "U2 Medley", "Be Still", "Amazing Grace" and "While My Guitar Gently Weeps". His most emulated composition is "Jazz in a Box," a virtuoso-level instrumental that requires a wide range of musical technique, finger dexterity, and exceptional skill.

Dykes is a devout Christian and has served as a minister in a small church in Florida, and the influence of Christianity is present in much of his work. He was a major endorser of Taylor Guitars and Rivera Sedona amplifiers, with his own signature models of each. In 2013 he began endorsing the Guild Guitar Company. Since 2015 he has touted his custom steel-fret Olson guitar as his "favorite guitar."

== Biography ==
Dykes was born in Cleveland, Tennessee, growing up in Jacksonville, Florida, in a decidedly Christian household. His father is referred to as "Bubba Dykes," and Doyle has a brother named Aubrey. He cites June 1965--during his church's "summer revival--as the moment he became a lifelong Christian as an 11-year-old boy, seeing "the lights of salvation and a new purpose and desire for my life, and since that day, I've never been the same."

His first guitar was a $30 Sears Roebuck Silvertone acoustic. Dykes claims a sailor named Barry Lackey was the most important influence in his development as a guitarist. Lackey attended his church one day, and using a thumbpick from his pocket, "completely blew him away" with his "spider picking", playing just like Chet Atkins and Merle Travis, Doyle's heroes. Lackey was then invited to his home for supper that night and showed him a right-hand picking pattern that "got his fingers working together in the right way, where the thumb played the bass and after-beat rhythm, and the three fingers took care of the rest." He later reunited with Lackey at a Taylor Guitars event in Detroit in 2002, and said that were it not for him, he would never have become a successful guitarist.

Dykes' early years as a guitarist took him around the world as he toured with the Stamps Quartet and later with Grand Ole Opry star Grandpa Jones. Dykes has since returned to the Grand Ole Opry for numerous performances. Dykes frequently plays church venues with small audiences, and some intimate shows that aren't advertised, stating, "I've been blessed with the opportunity to play music for people."

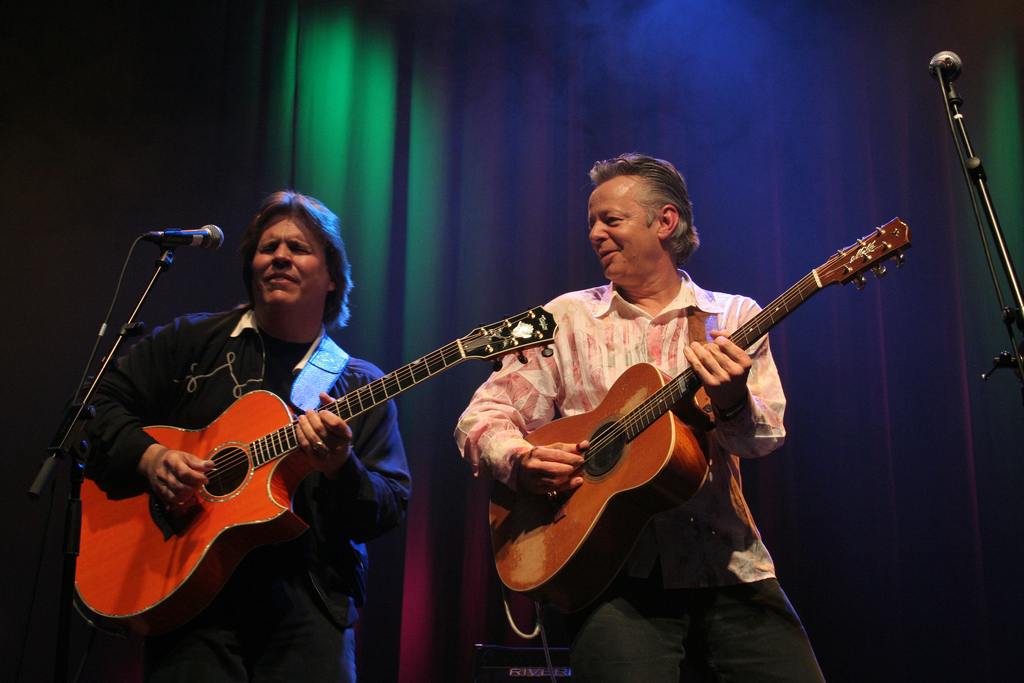
Performing with Tommy Emmanuel in the Netherlands, April 2006

Dykes was a longtime endorser of Taylor Guitars. According to owner Bob Taylor, "If I had to pick the artist who most represented the Taylor Guitars brand and who has done the most for us, I would say Doyle Dykes. Doyle has represented Taylor Guitars to more players for more years than anyone." The Doyle Dykes Signature Model Taylor guitar (“DDSM”) features an amplification system by L.R. Baggs.

On December 23, 2004, Dykes had an operation on a brain tumor in which the surgeon compressed his brain. The operation left him with a temporary loss of balance (meaning he had to learn to walk again) and suffered from extreme headaches and nausea for several years afterwards and ultimately left him deaf in his right ear. He and his wife, Rita, a high school sweetheart, have been married for at least 37 years and have four children, including daughters named Holly, Heidi and Hayley and a son named Caleb, also an accomplished guitarist. He has resided for many years in the Nashville area and was a close friend of Duane Eddy. Dykes is an avid collector of old Western movies, including the films of John Wayne, Gene Autry, Roy Rogers, and Steve McQueen. In 2011 he released a book The Lights of Marfa, a semi-autobiographical book documenting his encounters with God, with numerous Christian references to events in his own life.

== Discography ==
- 1996: Fingerstyle Guitar
- 1997: H.E.A.T
- 1998: Gitarre 2000
- 2000: Zelf: A Self Portrait on Guitar
- 2001: Country Fried Pickin'
- 2003: Songs of Faith and Freedom
- 2004: Chameleon
- 2008: Bridging the Gap
- 2013: Christmas with Doyle Dykes
- 2017: Return of the Falcon
- 2017: Life Behind the Guitar
