= The Fierce and the Dead =

English rock band

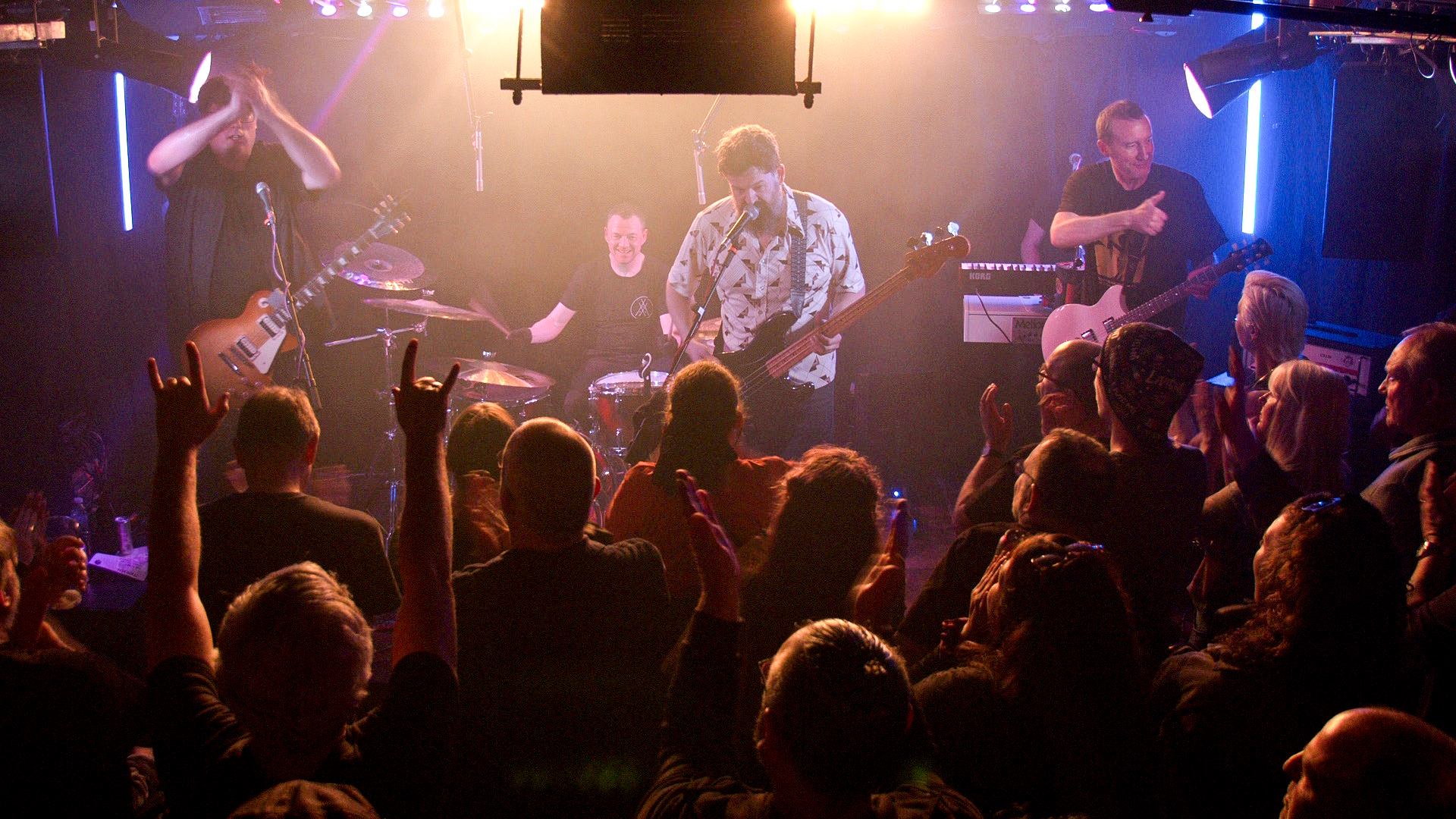
- The Fierce and the Dead in 2024

Background information
- Origin: London, England
- Genres: Post-rock, progressive rock, stoner rock, space rock, instrumental rock, alternative rock, psychedelic rock
- Years active: 2010–present
- Labels: Bad Elephant, Spencer Park
- Website: www.fierceandthedead.com

The Fierce and the Dead (often abbreviated as TFATD) are an alternative rock band formed in London in 2010. Initially known for instrumental post-rock, stoner rock and progressive rock compositions, they began incorporating vocals with their 2023 album, News from the Invisible World. The band members are originally from Rushden, Northamptonshire. They have released five studio albums and three EPs, toured with Hawkwind and have appeared at festivals including Ramblin' Man Fair and ArcTanGent. They were nominated at the Progressive Music Awards, once in 2013 and twice in 2018. Guitar.com noted that they had "cultivated a large following by using both traditional and modern means".

== History ==
=== Formation and Early Years (2010–2012) ===
The Fierce and the Dead began as an experimental recording project initiated by guitarist Matt Stevens, drummer Stuart Marshall and producer/bassist Kevin Feazey, as part of the recording of Stevens' second solo album. This resulted in the release of the Part 1 EP in February 2010.

Their debut album, If It Carries on Like This We Are Moving to Morecambe, was released in 2011 featuring saxophone by Terry Edwards.

In 2012 they added guitarist Steve Cleaton and released the On VHS EP. An appearance on snooker player Steve Davis and Kavus Torabi's radio show on Phoenix FM led to a UK tour with Torabi's band Knifeworld.

=== Spooky Action (2013–2017) ===
In 2013, The Fierce and the Dead were nominated for the Limelight award at the UK's Progressive Music Awards, an event organised by Prog magazine.

Their second album Spooky Action was released in October 2013 via Bad Elephant Music, which was reviewed positively by Malcolm Dome in Prog magazine (later republished on the Louder Sound website), The Progressive Aspect and Echoes and Dust. Actor Mark Benton also cited the album as a favourite in a 2020 feature for Louder Sound.

In 2014 the band headlined the Strangeforms festival in Leeds with Codes In The Clouds. Feazey and Stevens both appeared in the 2014 Prog Magazine Readers' Poll in their respective categories.

The Magnet EP was released in 2015 on Bad Elephant Music. Music Radar described it as "a furious burst of noisy, punk-edged instrumental rock". They played at the ArcTanGent festival 2015.

The band appeared at the 2016 Ramblin' Man Fair in Kent, sharing the bill with acts including Whitesnake, Thin Lizzy, Hawkwind and Europe where they recorded their Field Recordings live album. They played the 2016 HRH Prog festival, the headliners were Focus, Ian Anderson of Jethro Tull and Soft Machine.

In 2017, they played their first US show at RoSfest in Gettysburg, Pennsylvania which also featured Neal Morse and Änglagård. This show was recorded for the Live USA 17 album.

=== The Euphoric (2018–2022) ===
In 2018, the band released their third album The Euphoric, which received positive reviews from Louder Sound and Echoes and Dust. The album's cover was by Mark Buckingham (comic book artist). The band were played by Stuart Maconie on BBC 6 Music and featured in the Prog Magazine writers best albums of 2018. They were nominated for Best Band at Prog Magazine's 2018 Progressive Music Awards.

In 2019, they performed in Germany for the first time at the Freak Valley Festival, with God Is An Astronaut and Corrosion Of Conformity.

In 2020 the band released the Show Me Devon: Live At Kozfest '19 live album.They played their final show of 2020 at the Hope & Anchor in London which was recorded for the Live at the Hope & Anchor EP. In September 2020, the band took part in the Prog From Home online concert alongside Haken, Neal Morse, and Steve Hackett.

In 2022, the band performed at the Prognosis Festival in the Netherlands alongside Enslaved (band) and Katatonia. They also appeared at the HRH Prog Festival the same year, which featured Rick Wakeman, Hawklords, and Wishbone Ash. They played in Italy with Hawkwind, Gong (band), Tangerine Dream and Atomic Rooster at the 2 Days Of Prog Plus One Festival, which was filmed for DVD release.

=== News From The Invisible World (2023–2025) ===
In 2023, the band released their fourth album, News from the Invisible World, which featured lead vocals from bassist Kevin Feazey with Terry Edwards on saxophone and cover art by Mark Buckingham. Prog Magazine (republished at Louder Sound) praised the album for its "taut songwriting" and profiled the band. It was voted the 4th best album of 2023 in the Classic Rock Magazine readers' poll and was also included in Louder Sound's roundup of the best progressive rock albums of the year.They placed third in the Best Band category in the 2023 Prog Magazine Readers' Poll.

In 2024, they expanded to a five-piece, with Tom Hunt joining as a vocalist, keyboardist, and percussionist and released the Live At Ramsgate Music Hall '24 album. Golden Thread from News From The Invisible World was remixed by Porcupine Tree's Colin Edwin and released in February 2024.

The band headlined the 2024 A Sunday in September festival, supported by iamthemorning and headlined Winter's End Festival which also featured Tim Bowness, Oliver Wakeman and Solstice (British rock band). They also played a short UK headline tour.

In 2025 the band played Portals Festival at EartH (Evolutionary Arts Hackney) with Julie Christmas and And So I Watch You from Afar.

=== Regional Theatre (2026) ===
In 2026, The Fierce and the Dead released their fifth album, Regional Theatre, which once again featured lead vocals from bassist Kevin Feazey and cover art by Mark Buckingham. It was the first to feature keyboard player, percussionist and vocalist Tom Hunt as a full member.

== Musical style and influences ==
The Fierce and The Dead's sound blends elements of post-rock, stoner rock, prog rock, math rock, space rock, alternative rock and shoegaze. Guitar Player Magazine referred to them as art rock.

Influences cited by the band include King Crimson, Flaming Lips, Black Flag(Band), Voivod, Slowdive, Chicago Transit Authority, Carcass, Radiohead, Nirvana, The Mahavishnu Orchestra, Soundgarden, Ozric Tentacles, Napalm Death, The Groundhogs, Smashing Pumpkins, Bobby Conn, Monster Magnet, Faith No More, Hüsker Dü, Kyuss, Bad Brains, and Cardiacs. In an interview in Bass Guitar (magazine) Feazey spoke specifically of the influence of John Wetton and Billy Gould on his bass playing.

The Fierce and The Dead have been compared by critics to Deftones, Hawkwind, The Stooges, King Crimson, Mogwai, The Cure, Electric Wizard, Talking Heads, Television, Queens Of The Stone Age, The Electric Prunes, The Dillinger Escape Plan, U2,…And You Will Know Us by the Trail of Dead, and Big Black.

In a 2018 interview with MusicRadar, Stevens stated that he used Fender Mexican Telecaster and Shergold Masquerader guitars and a RedBear MK 60 amplifier. His pedalboard at the time included an Eventide H9, Montreal Assembly Count to 5, EarthQuaker Devices Palisades, Old Blood Noise Endeavors Dark Star, and a Line 6 DL4.

== Band members ==
- Kevin Feazey – bass, lead vocals, keyboards, production (2010–present)
- Matt Stevens – guitar, keyboards, programming (2010–present)
- Stuart Marshall – drums, percussion (2010–present)
- Steve Cleaton – guitar, programming (2012–present)
- Tom Hunt – keyboards, backing vocals, percussion (2024–present)

== Discography ==
=== Studio albums ===
- If It Carries on Like This We Are Moving to Morecambe (2011)
- Spooky Action (2013)
- The Euphoric (2018)
- News from the Invisible World (2023)
- Regional Theatre (2026)

=== EPs ===
- Part 1 EP (2010)
- On VHS EP (2012)
- Magnet EP (2015)

=== Live Albums ===
- Field Recordings (2017)
- Live USA 17 (2019) – UK Album Downloads Chart No. 44 on 17 October 2019
- Show Me Devon: Live At Kozfest '19 (2020)
- Live at Ramsgate Music Hall '24 (2024)
- If It Carries On Like This We're Moving To Your House - Best Of Live (2025)

=== Live EP ===
- Live at the Hope & Anchor (2020)

== Awards and nominations ==
- 2013 – Limelight Award (Progressive Music Awards – nominated)
- 2018 – Best Band and Best Album (Progressive Music Awards – nominated)
