= Peter Chilvers (musician) =

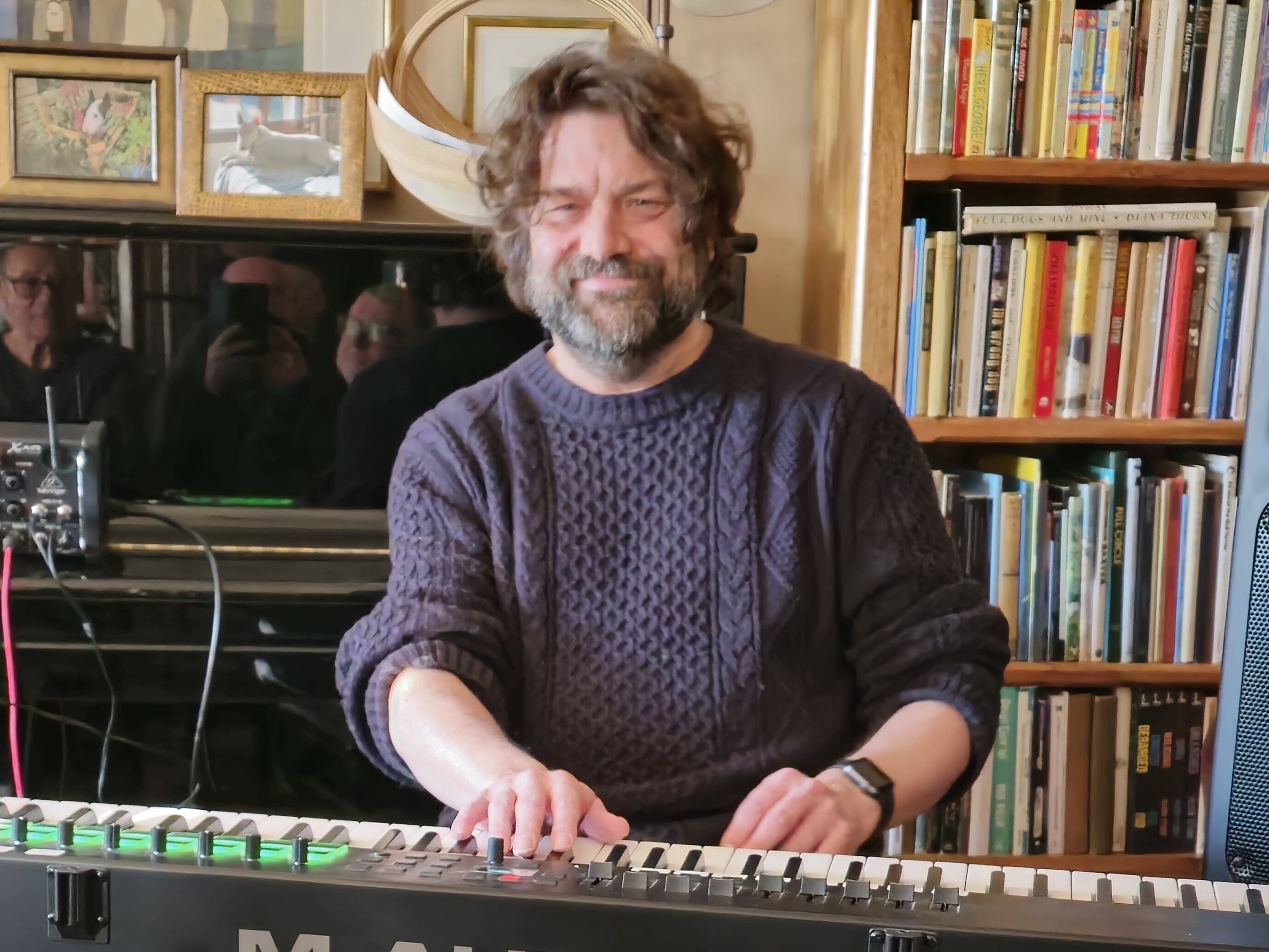
- Chilvers in 2025

Background information
- Genres: Electronic; minimalism; ambient; art rock; progressive rock; art pop; folk
- Occupations: Software designer; musician; songwriter; sound designer
- Instruments: Keyboards; guitar; bass
- Years active: 1992–present
- Labels: Burning Shed
- Website: peterchilvers.com

Peter Chilvers is a Cambridgeshire-based British musician and software designer.

Chilvers has created several iPhone applications in collaboration with Brian Eno. As a musician, he is best known as a collaborator with Eno and with Tim Bowness, but has also worked with Karl Hyde, Natalie Imbruglia, Chris Martin and others. He is one of the three co-founders of the Burning Shed online record label (with Tim Bowness and Pete Morgan).

== Work in software design and computer music ==
Chilvers has collaborated with Eno on several iPhone, iPod Touch, and iPad generative music applications: Bloom, Scape and Air (available on the iTunes Store). He has also written a number of generative music soundtracks for the Creatures computer games released by Creature Labs.

== Work as musician ==
Chilvers is a multi-instrumentalist who favours acoustic piano, electric piano, laptop computer, assorted keyboards and fretless bass guitar but also plays Chapman Stick, double bass, acoustic guitar and electric guitar. He is also a programmer, extending this skill to electronic percussion parts and extensive electronic orchestrations.

Chilvers has released four albums under his own name – He Wrote This (a selection of mostly instrumental pieces played on bass guitars, double bass and Chapman Stick), Stormwatcher (the soundtrack to an "imaginary film version" of Graham Joyce's fantasy novel of the same name), Free (a virally marketed CD-R release of predominantly ambient pieces) and Piano (a collection of solo piano pieces). He is also the leader of A Marble Calm – an ambient-inclined music collective centred on himself and reclusive marimba/vibraphone player Jon Hart. Other participants have included Theo Travis, Tim Bowness, Sandra O'Neill, Steve Adey and Cambridge experimental-country guitarist Rob Jackson. This project has released two albums – Surfacing and Blue Turns To Grey.

Chilvers is the instrumental half of the ambient-folk duo Letka (with singer Sandra O'Neill), which released the album Far Off Country in 2011. Letka was previously called Alias Grace, and released three previous recordings under that name – the albums Embers and Storm Blue Evening and the Griosach EP.

Chilvers is a frequent musical partner of Tim Bowness (the singer of No-Man). As Tim Bowness/Peter Chilvers, they released an album of dark reflective ballad songs – California, Norfolk – and an online only remix CDR, Overstrand. The two have also worked together as part of the ambient folk band Samuel Smiles (with Chilvers focussing mostly on piano), the experimental rock band Henry Fool (with Chilvers concentrating on bass guitar and electric piano), the singer-songwriter/ambient jazz project Slow Electric (with Chilvers on keyboards and atmospherics) and with The Fierce and the Dead's Matt Stevens. Chilvers has also collaborated with No-Man (playing piano for their comeback appearance at the Burning Shed Evening in June 2006, and contributing "space bass" to the album Together We're Stranger).

As a collaborator with Brian Eno, Chilvers has contributed to Eno's Small Craft on a Milk Sea and Drums Between the Bells albums and his soundtracks for The Lovely Bones and Spore. Chilvers is also credited as "digital archaeologist" on the 2008 David Byrne and Brian Eno album Everything That Happens Will Happen Today.

Chilvers' other musical collaborations include work with songwriter Paul Goodwin and Underworld's Karl Hyde (for whose live band he plays keyboards).

== Selected discography ==
Solo

- He Wrote This (Burning Shed, 2001)
- Stormwatcher (Burning Shed, 2002)
- Free (viral web release, 2002)
- Piano (Burning Shed, 2006)

Collaboration

- Alias Grace, Embers (self-released, 1998 – reissued on Burning Shed)
- Michael Bearpark/Peter Chilvers, Thin Air (Burning Shed, 1999)
- Tim Bowness/Samuel Smiles, World of Bright Futures (Hidden Art/Voiceprint, 1999)
- Tim Bowness/Samuel Smiles, How We Used To Live (Hidden Art/Voiceprint, 2000)
- Tim Bowness/Samuel Smiles, Live Archive One (Burning Shed, 2001)
- Tim Bowness/Samuel Smiles, Live Archive Two (Burning Shed, 2001)
- Alias Grace, Storm Blue Evening (Burning Shed, 2001)
- Tim Bowness/Peter Chilvers, California, Norfolk (Burning Shed, 2001)
- Tim Bowness/Peter Chilvers, Overstrand (Burning Shed, 2003)
- A Marble Calm, Surfacing (Burning Shed, 2004)
- Stefano Panunzi, Timelines (Emerald Recordings, 2005)
- A Marble Calm, Blue Turns To Grey (ToneFloat, 2006)

Guest musician

- Darkroom, Daylight (3rd Stone Ltd., 1998)
- No-Man, Together We're Stranger (KScope/Snapper Music, 2003)
- Tim Bowness, My Hotel Year (One Little Indian, 2004)

Other

- David Byrne and Brian Eno – Everything That Happens Will Happen Today (2008)
