= Ramblin' Man Fair =

- Genre: Heavy metal, rock
- Locations: Mote Park, Maidstone, England, UK
- Years active: 2015 – 2019
- Website: www.ramblinmanfair.com

Ramblin' Man Fair was a British Classic Rock festival, held annually at Mote Park in Maidstone, England, between 2015 and 2019. The festival featured many large acts including Scorpions, ZZ Top, Black Stone Cherry, Mott the Hoople, The Cult, Whitesnake, Gregg Allman, Y&T, Extreme, Rival Sons, Europe, Saxon, Steel Panther and Kyle Gass of Tenacious D.

== History ==
=== 2015 ===
This was the first edition of the festival and featured Scorpions and Gregg Allman as the headliners.

=== 2016 ===
This was the second edition of the festival and featured Whitesnake and Black Stone Cherry as the headliners.

=== 2017 ===
This was the third edition of the festival and featured Extreme and ZZ Top as the headliners.

=== 2018 ===
This was the fourth edition of the festival and featured Mott the Hoople and The Cult as the headliners.

=== 2019 ===
This was the fifth edition of the festival and featured Foreigner and Black Stone Cherry as headliners.

=== 2020–21 cancellations due to COVID-19 ===
The 2020 edition of the festival was cancelled due to the COVID-19 pandemic in the United Kingdom. It was intended to be headlined by Lynyrd Skynyrd, Hawkwind, Clutch and Rival Sons.

The 2021 edition was also cancelled, citing a lack of government COVID-19 insurance scheme for music festivals.

== Similar festivals ==
- Download Festival
- Bloodstock Open Air
- The Downs, Bristol
- Reading and Leeds Festivals
- Stonedead Festival
