= Andrew Booker (musician) =

British drummer and vocalist

Andrew Booker is a British drummer and vocalist best known for his work with Tim Bowness (in Bowness's solo band, No-Man and in Henry Fool) and with ex-Yes guitarist Peter Banks (in the improvising band Harmony in Diversity).

Booker has also released a solo mini-album Ahead and formed a duo called Pulse Engine with Nick Cottam (bass). He also played with London-band The Fugitives, Michael Bearpark and David Cross. Booker organised the website and evening Improvizone, which led to one compilation available through the Burning Shed label.

== Discography ==
- Andrew Booker, Ahead (1996)
- The Fugitives, Promo (2003)
- Harmony in Diversity, Trying (2006)
- Darkroom, Some of These Numbers Mean Something (2008)
- No-Man, Schoolyard Ghosts (2008)
- No-Man, Wherever There is Light (2009)
- The Fugitives, Sanskara (2010)
- Schoolyard Ghosts, Memories of Machines (2011)
- No-Man, Love and Endings (2012)
- Sanguine Hum, The Weight of the World (2013)
- Henry Fool, Men Singing (2013)
- Darkroom, Gravity's Dirty Work (2013)
- Sanguine Hum, Now We Have Light (2015)
- Tim Bowness, Stupid Things That Mean the World (2015)
- Tim Bowness, Lost in the Ghost Light (2017)
- Peter Banks's Harmony in Diversity, The Complete Recordings (2018)
- David Cross & Andrew Booker, Ends Meeting (2018)
