= Tim Bowness =

English singer (born 1963)

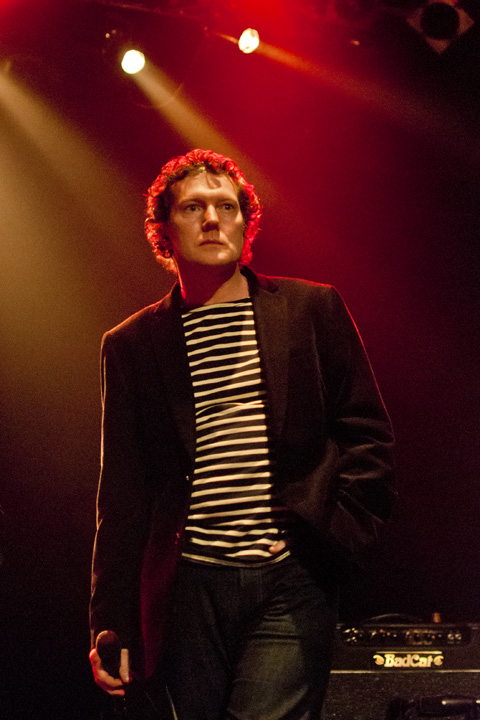
- Bowness with No-Man in 2012

Background information
- Born: 29 November 1963 (age 62); Warrington, Cheshire, England
- Genres: Art rock; dream pop; post-rock; progressive rock; ambient
- Occupations: Singer; songwriter
- Instruments: Vocals; guitar; keyboards
- Years active: 1982–present
- Labels: One Little Indian; Inside Out Music; Kscope
- Member of: No-Man; Henry Fool; Memories of Machines; Slow Electric; Darkroom
- Formerly of: Samuel Smiles; Centrozoon
- Website: Official site

Tim Bowness (born 29 November 1963) is an English singer and songwriter primarily known for his work as part of the band No-Man, a long-term project formed in 1987 with Porcupine Tree's Steven Wilson.

== Music career ==
In addition to recording albums with No-Man (for record labels such as One Little Indian, Sony/Epic, and Kscope), Bowness has appeared on albums by US artists OSI and David Torn, Italian artists Alice, Saro Cosentino, Fjieri, Nosound and Stefano Panunzi, Norwegian groups White Willow and The Opium Cartel, and others.

In 1994, he recorded an album with Porcupine Tree/Japan/Rain Tree Crow keyboard player Richard Barbieri, called Flame.

Bowness has been a core or occasional member of several other bands. He has sung for German band Centrozoon and British electro-improvisers Darkroom on the more vocal-orientated projects performed and released by each group. He is the lead singer and guitarist for Henry Fool and also sings for Memories of Machines. He was singer (and occasional second guitarist) for Samuel Smiles between 1992 and 2000. Bowness also has a longstanding duo collaboration with Peter Chilvers (with whom he has worked in Samuel Smiles and Henry Fool). This project has so far produced two albums, California, Norfolk (2002) and Modern Ruins (2020).

Bowness's debut solo album, My Hotel Year was released on One Little Indian in 2004. The album made use of Bowness collaborators both old and new, and featured Roger Eno and Hugh Hopper amongst others.

In 2009, Bowness co-wrote and co-produced Talking with Strangers, an album by former Fairport Convention singer, Judy Dyble.

Warm Winter, the debut album by Memories of Machines (a collaboration with Nosound's Giancarlo Erra), was issued on Mascot in April 2011, and the self-titled debut release by Anglo Estonian project Slow Electric was released on Panegyric in October 2011.

Bowness's second solo album Abandoned Dancehall Dreams was released on 23 June 2014 on Inside Out Music. Produced by Bowness and mixed by Steven Wilson, collaborators included Stephen James Bennett. Pat Mastelotto, Colin Edwin and Classical composer Andrew Keeling. Richard Barbieri and Grasscut provided mixes for the bonus disc. Abandoned Dancehall Dreams came out to some of the best reviews of Bowness' career. Receiving positive endorsements from Prog and Classic Rock, the album reached No. 18 in the official UK Rock charts and No. 1 in Prog magazine's July 2014 and August 2014 charts.

A follow-up to Abandoned Dancehall Dreams, Stupid Things That Mean the World, was released on 17 July 2015 on Inside Out Music. Bowness admitted similarities between the two albums, in both the musical approach and artwork, calling it the second part of a new chapter that began with Abandoned Dancehall Dreams. Produced by Bowness and mixed by Bruce Soord, collaborators included Stephen James Bennett, Peter Hammill, Colin Edwin, Phil Manzanera and David Rhodes. The album reached No. 10 in both the official UK Rock and UK Vinyl charts, and No. 1 in Prog magazine's July 2015 and August 2015 charts. In September 2015, Stupid Things That Mean the World was No. 9 in the first ever Official Charts Company Progressive Albums chart.

Tim Bowness's fourth solo album Lost in the Ghost Light – a concept album revolving around the onstage and backstage thoughts of a veteran musician – was released on 17 February 2017 on Inside Out Music. The album garnered very positive reviews from the Rock media – Prog, Powerplay, Classic Rock, Shindig! – as well as in more mainstream publications such as The Daily Express, Mojo and Classic Pop. Produced Tim Bowness with Stephen James Bennett, the album mixed and mastered by Steven Wilson and alongside performances by regular collaborators such as Stephen James Bennett, Bruce Soord, Colin Edwin and Andrew Keeling, featured guest appearances from Jethro Tull's Ian Anderson, and ex Camel/Happy The Man keyboard player Kit Watkins. Lost in the Ghost Light reached No.5 in the official UK Rock chart, No.8 in the official UK Progressive chart and won "Album Cover of the Year" at the 2017 Progressive Music Awards.

Flowers at the Scene was released on 1 March 2019 on Inside Out Music. Like its predecessor, the album garnered extremely positive reviews from the Rock media in Britain and Europe, as well as in more mainstream publications such as The Daily Express, Mojo and Classic Pop. Produced by Tim Bowness with Steven Wilson – as No-Man – and Brian Hulse, the album featured guest appearances from Peter Hammill, Kevin Godley, Andy Partridge, Jim Matheos, David Longdon, Colin Edwin, Dylan Howe and others. Flowers at the Scene reached No.5 in both the official UK Rock and UK Progressive charts, No.24 in the official UK Vinyl chart, and No.38 in the official UK Physical sales chart.

Late Night Laments, Bowness's sixth solo album, was released on 28 August 2020 on Inside Out Music. A more intimate and atmospheric work than any of his previous solo albums, guest players included Richard Barbieri, Kavus Torabi and Colin Edwin. The album was mixed by Steven Wilson, mastered by Calum Malcolm, and reached No.45 in the official UK Physical sales chart, No.4 in the UK Progressive charts, and No.56 in the official Scottish chart. The album was No.14 in Prog Magazine's Best Of 2020 critic's list.

Butterfly Mind, Bowness's seventh solo album, was released on 5 August 2022 on Inside Out Music. Seen as the most eclectic and dynamic of his solo releases, high-profile guests such as Ian Anderson, Dave Formula, Peter Hammill, Nick Beggs, (ex-Elbow drummer) Richard Jupp and others contributed to the album. Butterfly Mind generated the most positive reviews of Bowness's career, alongside his highest UK chart placings. To promote the record he played a series of concerts with Peter Chilvers and Matt Stevens (of The Fierce and the Dead).

He released the Powder Dry album in 2024 and played the Winters End Festival with a band consisting of Andy Edwards (musician), John Jowitt, Matt Stevens (of The Fierce and the Dead) and Rob Groucutt.

== Business ==
In 2001, Bowness co-founded the online record label and store Burning Shed with Peter Chilvers and Pete Morgan. Originally a label dedicated to producing online, on-demand CDRs of experimental side-projects by the likes of Bass Communion, Hugh Hopper and Roger Eno) it quickly evolved into hosting official online stores for No-Man, Porcupine Tree, Jethro Tull, King Crimson, Andy Partridge, Big Big Train, Will Sergeant and many other artists.

== The Album Years ==
In May 2020, Bowness launched 'The Album Years', an audio-only podcast with his partner in No-Man, Steven Wilson. It was very successful upon release, charting highly all around the world on Apple Podcasts. Starting in March 2024 new video episodes of the podcast were recorded and released.

== Charting songs and albums ==
Album / Song	Chart	Position	Year
Taking It Like a Man (with No-Man)	US Billboard Dance/Club Play	34	1994
Viaggio in Italia (with Alice)	Italian Albums	16	2003
Abandoned Dancehall Dreams	UK Rock Albums	18	2014
Stupid Things That Mean the World	UK Rock Albums	10	2015
Stupid Things That Mean the World	UK Top 100 Physical Albums	75	2015
Stupid Things That Mean the World	UK Vinyl Albums	10	2015
Stupid Things That Mean the World	UK Progressive Albums	9	2015
Heaven Taste (with No-Man)	UK Vinyl Singles	5	2016
Heaven Taste (with No-Man)	UK Top 100 Physical Singles	8	2016
Lost in the Ghost Light	UK Rock Albums	5	2017
Lost in the Ghost Light	UK Top 100 Physical Albums	64	2017
Lost in the Ghost Light	UK Vinyl Albums	35	2017
Lost in the Ghost Light	UK Progressive Albums	8	2017
Flowers at the Scene	UK Rock Albums	5	2019
Flowers at the Scene	UK Top 100 Physical Albums	38	2019
Flowers at the Scene	UK Vinyl Albums	24	2019
Flowers at the Scene	UK Progressive Albums	5	2019
Flowers at the Scene	Official Scottish Albums Top 100	65	2019
Love You to Bits (with No-Man)	UK Top 100 Physical Albums	44	2019
Love You to Bits (with No-Man)	UK Vinyl Albums	23	2019
Love You to Bits (with No-Man)	UK Top 100 Albums	94	2019
Love You to Bits (with No-Man)	Official Scottish Albums Top 100	57	2019
Love You to Bits (with No-Man)	UK Progressive Albums	4	2019
Late Night Laments	UK Top 100 Physical Albums	45	2020
Late Night Laments	UK Progressive Albums	4	2020
Late Night Laments	Official Scottish Albums Top 100	56	2020
Butterfly Mind	UK Rock Albums	4	2022
Butterfly Mind	UK Top 100 Physical Albums	16	2022
Butterfly Mind	UK Vinyl Albums	21	2022
Butterfly Mind	Official Scottish Albums Top 100	25	2022
Butterfly Mind	UK Progressive Albums	6	2022

== Select discography (Outside No-Man) ==
=== Solo albums ===
- My Hotel Year (One Little Indian, 2004) – Debut solo album
- Abandoned Dancehall Dreams (Inside Out Music, 2014) – 2nd solo album
- Stupid Things That Mean the World (Inside Out Music, 2015) – 3rd solo album
- Lost in the Ghost Light (Inside Out Music, 2017) – 4th solo album
- Songs from the Ghost Light (Burning Shed, 2017) – Lost in the Ghost Light companion release featuring outtakes, remixes and live performances.
- Flowers at the Scene (Inside Out Music, 2019) – 5th solo album
- Late Night Laments (Inside Out Music, 2020) – 6th solo album
- Butterfly Mind (Inside Out Music, 2022) – 7th solo album
- Powder Dry (KSCOPE, 2024) – 8th solo album

=== With Peter Chilvers ===
- California, Norfolk (Burning Shed, 2002) – with Peter Chilvers
- Slow Electric (Burning Shed, 2010) – as Slow Electric – with Peter Chilvers, UMA (Robert Jüjendal, Aleksei Saks) and Tony Levin
- Modern Ruins (Burning Shed, 2020) – with Peter Chilvers

=== With Plenty ===
- It Could Be Home (2018)
- Enough (2021)

=== Other albums ===
- Flame (One Little Indian, 1994) – with Richard Barbieri
- Ones And Zeros (Voiceprint, 1997) – with Saro Cosentino (guest vocals on one track)
- Viaggio in Italia (NuN Entertainment, 2003) – with Alice (guest vocals on two tracks)
- The Scent of Crash and Burn EP (Burning Shed, 2003) – with centrozoon
- Never Trust the Way You Are (Resonancer, 2004) – with centrozoon
- Duality (Holy Records, 2008) – with Rajna (guests on three tracks)
- Lightdark (Kscope, 2008) – with Nosound (guest vocals on one track)
- Blood (Inside Out, 2009) – with OSI (guest vocals on one track)
- Talking with Strangers (FixIt, 2009) with Judy Dyble (guest vocals throughout the album, co-written & co-produced by Bowness)
- "Fjieri: "Endless"", (Forward Music Italy, 2009) – with Stefano Panunzi, Nicola Lori, Mick Karn, Richard Barbieri, Gavin Harrison, Nicola Alesini, Andrea Chimenti
- "A Rose (Stefano Panunzi album)" (Emerald Recordings, ER-CD 01/09, 2009) – with Mick Karn, Thomas Leer, Giancarlo Erra, Theo Travis, Robby Aceto, Fabio Fraschini, Markus Reuter, Andrea Chimenti
- Warm Winter (Mascot, 2011) – with Giancarlo Erra (as Memories of Machines)
- "Fjieri: "Words Are All We Have", (Emerald Recordings, ER-CD 02/15, 2015) – with Stefano Panunzi, Jakko Jakszyk, Gavin Harrison, Nicola Lori
- Skyscraper Souls (Cherry Red, 2017) – with Geoff Downes & Chris Braide (guests on one track)
- UBIK (Sweet Hole, 2022) – with Sweet Hole (guests on as UBIK voice on some tracks)
