= Darkroom (band) =

British electronic music band

Darkroom is a British electronic music project created by Andrew "Os" Ostler (synthesizers, loops, processing and bass clarinet) and Michael Bearpark (guitars, bass guitar and loops). Other contributors to the project have been Tim Bowness (voice and voice loops) and Peter Chilvers (space bass).

The project performs live in the UK and has released several albums, mainly available via the independent record label Burning Shed.

== History ==
Darkroom originally formed in 1996 under the name Collective. The project featured three musicians who had been working together since the early 1990s: synthesizer player Andrew "Os" Ostler, guitarist Michael Bearpark and vocalist Tim Bowness (the latter being the singer for No-Man, an art-pop band who had by then released six albums on One Little Indian Records, 3rd Stone Ltd. and Voiceprint). Collective was formed in order to provide a live soundtrack at the Nevers Film Festival in France, working via extensive looping of synthesizers, electric guitar and abstract vocals.

The project self-released the limited-edition Soundtracks album in 1997, following which there was a name change to Darkroom and an ill-fated performance slot at the Wise Crone Cafe tent at the 1997 Glastonbury festival. In 1998 Darkroom released the Carpetworld EP on the Halloween Society imprint of 3rd Stone Ltd. The EP was followed in the same year by the Darkroom debut album Daylight, which featured most of the tracks from Soundtracks.

In 1999, Darkroom released their second album Seethrough on the peoplesound.com label (it was later reissued in 2003). In contrast to the more free-form approach of Daylight, Seethrough featured a number of pieces with semi-sung, semi-spoken lyrics. During this period Darkroom played two gigs in Cambridge and also performed at Richard Sanderson's London improv music night The Clubroom. In 2000, Bearpark and Bowness played without Ostler at the Scala, London, providing accompaniment for the Roswell alien autopsy film.

Shifting their base of operation to Bowness' own Burning Shed label, Darkroom released three albums in the "Fallout" series between 2001 and 2002. These albums drew predominantly on live recordings and returned to the free-form looping material of Daylight. Fallout 1 was based around trio performance recordings from London and Cambridge in 1999 and 2000, while Fallout 2 featured live duo recordings from Os and Bearpark, and Fallout 3 subjected further live trio recordings to studio post-production. A further recording from the period, Freefall, was released in 2002 as a free download. Bowness only featured on Fallout 1 and Fallout 3, and future Darkroom activity would be centered around the duo of Ostler and Bearpark.

Darkroom continued to play live, with their main physical performance base now being Cambridge and East Anglia. Having played the Digital/Analogue Cambridge Festival of 2001, Darkroom collated the live material which they'd recorded and invited various other electronic musicians to remix it. The results were eventually released in 2004 on The DAC Mixes - remix contributors included centrozoon, DJ Dictaphone, Theo Travis, Nemeton and Steven Wilson's ambient project Bass Communion. In October 2002, Darkroom played at the debut "ACEMS Presents..." concert evening by the Anglia Contemporary & Experimental Music Society. In 2003, they played two further concerts in Cambridge - the February "Self Assembly" event in the Kettle's Yard New Music Mornings and the First (International) Cambridge Festival of Looping. In 2004, they played the Second (International) Cambridge Festival of Looping, and in August 2005 the First International Loopfestival in Zürich.

In 2006, Bearpark (plus a briefly returning Bowness) played as part of a live internet-streamed performance as part of the Y2K6 International Live Looping Festival. From 2007 onwards, Darkroom became frequent performers at Improvizone, a London-based improvisation night which they had helped to set up with drummer Andrew Booker. More recent international performances as part of the Live looping movement have been at the 2009 Antwerp Loopfest and the 2nd International Köln Loopfest in 2011.

In 2008, Darkroom released Some of These Numbers Mean Something, which featured a greater use of acoustic guitar as sound source and a musical style which incorporated "'70s space rock, '80s Sheffield electronica, '60s guitar instrumentals and '90s post rock."

In addition to his Darkroom work, Andrew Ostler owns and runs audio software and hardware vendor Expert Sleepers and has remixed tracks by No-Man and Bass Communion. He had a short-lived solo project in the early 2000s called Carbon Boy, which released two EPs on peoplesound.

== Discography ==
- Carpetworld EP - (3rd Stone Ltd. (HAL 8001CD), 1998)
- Daylight - (3rd Stone Ltd. (HAL 8002CD), 1998)
- Seethrough - (peoplesound.com, 1999 - re-issued on Burning Shed, 2003) CD-R
- Fallout 1 - (Burning Shed, 2001) CD-R
- Fallout 2 - (Burning Shed, 2001) CD-R
- Fallout 3 - (Burning Shed, 2002) CD-R
- Freefall - (2002) free internet release.
- The DAC Mixes - (Burning Shed, 2004) CD-R
- The DAC Mixes (Slight Return) - (Burning Shed, 2004) free download.
- Some of These Numbers Mean Something - (Burning Shed (bshed 0408), 2008)
- Gravity's Dirty Work - (Burning Shed, 2013)

=== Carbon Boy (Andrew Ostler solo project) ===
- Carbon Boy EP - (peoplesound.com, 2000)
- Baby Croon EP - (peoplesound.com, 2001)
- "Nano" - track on Collection 2: Moving (Databloem, 2003)

=== Os (Andrew Ostler) guest appearances as guest musician/remixer ===
- No-Man, Flowermix - (Hidden Art, 1995)
- Bass Communion, Bass Communion (Reconstructions and Recycling) - (Headphone Dust, 2003)
