= TU =

Tu or TU may refer to:

== Language ==
- Tu language
- Tu (cuneiform), a cuneiform sign
- tu or tú the 2nd-person singular subject pronoun in many languages; see personal pronoun
- T–V distinction (from the Latin pronouns tu and vos), the use in some languages, of a different personal pronoun for formality or social distance
- Tsu (kana), also romanized as tu

== People and names ==
- Tū (Tūmatauenga), a supernatural being in Māori mythology
- Tu people, the Monguor people of the People's Republic of China
  - Tu language
- Tu Holloway (born 1989), basketball player for Maccabi Rishon LeZion in the Israeli Basketball Premier League
- Tu (surname) 屠, a rare Chinese family name
- Du (surname) 杜 or Tu, a common Chinese family name

== Music ==
- Tú (Canadian band), a Canadian pop music duo in the late-1980s
- Tu (American band), an American duo, formed by member of King Crimson

=== Albums ===
- Tū (album), a 2018 studio album by Alien Weaponry
- Tu, a 1978 album by Umberto Tozzi
- Tu, a 2003 album by Tu (American band)

=== Songs ===
- "Tu" (Umberto Tozzi song), 1978
- "Tu", a song by Umberto Bindi, 1959
- "Tu", a song by Ewa Farna, 2015

== Other ==
- Tu (film) Here (2003 film) or Tu, a Croatian film
- Tu, a brand of clothing from Sainsbury's
- Tu (cake), a type of Tibetan cake
- Tuesday

== Acronyms ==
=== Companies and organizations ===
- TU (union), the international union for T-Mobile workers
- TU Media, a Digital Multimedia Broadcasting mobile companies in Korea
- Toimihenkilöunioni (Union of Salaried Employees), a Finnish trade union
- Tunisair (IATA airline code TU)
- Transunion, a consumer credit reporting agency
- Tupolev, a Russian aerospace and defence company
- Teknisk Ukeblad, a Norwegian engineering magazine
- The Times Union, an Albany newspaper
- New York City Teachers Union (1916–1964), commonly known as the "TU"
- Trout Unlimited, conservation group

=== Units of measurement ===
- TU (time unit), a unit of time equal to 1024 microseconds
- Transmission unit, a historical unit of loss in long distance telephony
- Tritium unit, a measure of tritium concentration in water (1 tritium atom per 1 × 10^{18} hydrogen atoms, or ~ 0.118 Bq/L)
- Tuberculin unit, a measure of strength of tuberculin

=== Universities ===
==== In the United States ====
- Taylor University, Indiana
- Temple University, Pennsylvania
- Thomas University, Georgia
- Touro University California, California
- Touro University Nevada, Nevada
- Towson University, Maryland
- Trinity University, Texas
- Troy University, Alabama
- Tufts University, Massachusetts
- Tulane University, Louisiana
- Tuskegee University, Alabama
- University of Tulsa, Oklahoma
- t.u., a derisive reference to the University of Texas at Austin by students and supporters of in-state rival Texas A&M University

==== In other countries ====
- University of Tartu (Tartu Ülikool), Estonia
- Any Technische Universität, i.e. university of technology in German-speaking countries
- Technische Universiteit Delft, Netherlands
- Technische Universiteit Eindhoven, Netherlands
- Tezpur University, Assam, India
- Thapar University, Patiala, India
- Thammasat University, Thailand
- Tianjin University, Tianjin, China
- Tibet University, Lhasa, Tibet Autonomous Region, China
- Tooling University, an American non-profit educational technology company
- Tribhuvan University, Kathmandu, Nepal
- Technological Universities of Myanmar
- Triam Udom Suksa School

=== Other uses ===
- TUTV, a television station in El Salvador
- Tren Urbano, the metro system in San Juan, Puerto Rico
- Tu Hundred, a district of Vccästmanland in Sweden
- Universal Time, "Tempus Universalis"
- Thulium, a chemical element with obsolete symbol Tu
- Translation unit, a single cognitive unit of text
  - Translation unit (programming), the ultimate input to the compiler

== See also ==
- Tú (disambiguation)
- UT (disambiguation)
