= Tuner (band) =

American-German electronic rock supertrio

- Genres: Progressive rock; art rock; post-progressive
- Years active: 2005–present
- Label: Unsung
- Members: Pat Mastelotto; Markus Reuter; Trey Gunn
- Website: tu-ner.com

Tuner (also capitalised as TUNER and TU-NER) is an electronic rock trio formed by drummer/programmer Pat Mastelotto (of King Crimson) and touch guitarists Markus Reuter and Trey Gunn. Tuner has released six albums and also functions as a production team, having produced and arranged records for Tovah, Moonbound and Chrystabell and as remixers (having contributed to Steven Wilson's Insurgentes Rmxs). Mastelotto and Reuter also work together in Stick Men and The Crimson ProjeKct.

== History ==
Since 1994, Pat Mastelotto has drummed with King Crimson and several of its related ProjeKCts, as well as TU (with his former King Crimson bandmate Trey Gunn) and the Austin-based MastiKa. Markus Reuter also had King Crimson connections, having been a former student of Robert Fripp's Guitar Craft and subsequently gone on to work with the Craft-inspired Europa String Choir. By the mid-2000s, however, he was better known as a solo performer and for his work with centrozoon.

Mastelotto, Reuter and Gunn's collaboration first came about after they bumped into each other on a train in Germany in the year 2000. Trey Gunn, being a mutual acquaintance, introduced Mastelotto and Reuter to each other, who exchanged CDs. However, it was only several years later when Mastelotto would invite Reuter to create music.

Tuner was originally a duo, Mastelotto and Reuter, and have gone on to release four albums – the studio recordings Pole and Totem and the live recordings Müüt and ZWAR. Their fifth duo album, FACE, was released as credited to the two individual names. In 2022, Trey Gunn joined the group officially, becoming a trio, and have released two further albums in 2023 and 2024.

== Musical style ==
Tuner's music is best classified as experimental art-rock with a strong element of textural looping. The two performers create a dense, layered sound. Reuter has described their music as "overlapping and independently shifting rhythmic patterns combined with beautiful melodies" and as featuring ideas which can be "permutated endlessly." He has also described the band's work as "a vehicle for the things (which he and Mastelotto) always wanted to do, but never had a chance to."

Although Tuner's music has sometimes been compared to the improvisational approach which Mastelotto followed with the ProjeKCts, Reuter has described the band's initial musical approach as having been a reaction against free improvisation and jamming, and more focused on composition, although improvisation has been reintroduced into Tuner's music. Tuner live performances feature a heavy degree of live sampling technology to supplement pre-prepared parts and improvised playing.

== Personnel ==
- Pat Mastelotto – acoustic & electronic drums & percussion, programming, loops & processing, vocals.
- Markus Reuter – U8 Touch Guitar, Warr Guitar, loops & processing.
- Trey Gunn – Warr Guitar

== Discography ==
=== as a duo ===
- TOTEM (Unsung Records, 2005, remaster 2008)
- POLE (Unsung Records, 2007)
- MÜÜT (Unsung Records, 2008)
- ZWAR (Unsung Records, 2010)
- FACE (as Pat Mastelotto & Markus Reuter, Tempus Fugit, 2017)

=== as a trio, with Trey Gunn ===
- T-1 Contact Information (7d Media, 2023)
- T-2 TU-Ner For Lovers (7d Media, 2024)
- Rendezvous Rodeo- live (7d Media, 2026)

=== as producers ===
- Tovah - Escapologist (Lola Lounge, 2008),
- Moonbound - Peak Of Eternal Light (Unsung Records, 2011)
- Chrystabell - Strange Darling (unreleased, 2011)

=== as remixers ===
- Steven Wilson - Insurgentes Rmxs (Kscope, 2009),
