= Todmorden 513 =

Composition by Markus Reuter

Todmorden 513 is a composition by the German composer Markus Reuter.

Originally written for and recorded by a small electro-acoustic ensemble in 2010, the piece was reworked for full orchestra in 2012 with the assistance of American conductor-composer Thomas A. Blomster, and was performed in Denver, Colorado, USA in April 2013. The original electro-acoustic small-group version was released as Reuter's Todmorden 513 album on the Hyperfunction label in 2011. The 2013 orchestral version has been recorded and released on the 7D Media label.

== Background ==
In 2011, Markus Reuter was best known as an experimental rock musician, but he was also a classically trained musician who had begun composing at the age of 11. Encouraged in his early composition efforts by his piano teacher Ulrich Pollmann, Reuter had gone on to study music history, theory and analysis with Karlheinz Straetmanns (a composer in the lineage of Harald Genzmer and Paul Hindemith). In 1996, while at university in Bielefield, Reuter studied permutation-based compositional principles with Daniel Schell, Indian music with Ashok Pathak and free improvisation with Gerd Lisken. In addition, he spent seven years between 1991 and 1998 as a student of Guitar Craft, studying with Robert Fripp, Tony Geballe and others. Other influences which inspired Reuter's compositional thinking included Olivier Messiaen, David Bedford, Karlheinz Stockhausen, Johann Sebastian Bach, Alban Berg, Anton Webern, Mike Oldfield, Ernst Krenek and the collaborations of George Gurdjieff and Thomas de Hartmann.

Reuter's subsequent work with ensembles and as a solo performer involved a wide spread of influences and musical factors including generative music. From 2005 onwards, Reuter's interest in generative music came to the fore in his work with the experimental rock band Tuner and also informed the harmonic designs of a new piece which would become "Todmorden 513".

== Composition and musical style ==
"Todmorden 513" was developed using an algorithmic combinatorial compositional technique devised by Reuter, which generates a continuous movement and sequence of 513 harmonies and triads. The piece uses mathematical function and feedback loops modulated by processes, inspired by the cells of living organisms (Reuter has cited the shapes of leaves as an example).

The original press release for the composition explains that "the notes of each harmony or triad is then fed back into the same algorithm, resulting in a progression of chords and note clusters of highly-varied density, ranging from simple two-note harmonies to dense twelve-note chords spread across several octaves. Starting on an A flat, the sequences of pitches form a kind of melodic or thematic line throughout. The rhythms of the performing instrumental trios and quartets are derived from the chord sequences themselves, which are looped across the whole piece, mapped to the notes of each chord, then mixed together. From there it is split into three or four independent voices respectively. The result is a shifting set of harmonic densities — at times quite spare — ranging from a harmony of two instruments to other moments of thick and lush instrumentation."

Musicologist Dr. Mary C. Jungerman (who also performed in the piece's orchestral premiere) has noted that Reuter's compositional approach "follows in the long lineage of German musical organization from Bach through Beethoven, Brahms and Schoenberg and is also strongly reminiscent of the highly serialized compositions of Karlheinz Stockhausen."

Reuter himself describes the piece as "completely deterministic" and the result of attempting to create "a new sound world" by recombining pitches. He has cited the work of Olivier Messiaen as the main inspiration for his approach and has also expressed his belief that old and new musical systems need to be reconciled and integrated for future composition: "I believe that to create a new sound, normative or deterministic properties of older classical music from the Baroque era or Classical era or the Romantic era need to make a return in a big way. We’ve had 50 years - 60 years - of chaos, of experimentation, but there is a natural limit to what you can discover with experimentation because we're humans: we need some kind of a system, we need rules in order to come up with new ideas. If we are open to starting to use old knowledge, and accepting old knowledge as something valuable, and also using the new technologies, and we combine that - we come into a new world where knowledge counts again. Now is the time to start being open to combining the old and the new...as simple as that."

== Title and interpretation ==
The title of the piece is pronounced "Todmorden five-thirteen" and juxtaposes the number of compositional elements used within the piece with the name of a small English market town in West Yorkshire, sixteen miles west of Halifax. Reuter was interested by the sinister Germanic implications of the Todmorden placename when he first encountered it (in German,"tod" means "death" and "morden" means "to murder") and used it to illustrate his own reflections on individual interpretation.

In an interview with Colorado Public Radio, Reuter explained that "it's part of my understanding of the world that the impression that something gives you is not necessarily what it is, or means. Especially if you're speaking different languages you kind of start to realise that a lot of what we experience is so coloured – obviously coloured by our language, coloured by our culture, coloured by our expectations. And this word was just an extreme illustration for me of how differently human beings experience the same thing." He went on to note that “Todmorden 513” fits into this concept because it is "designed (composed) in such a way that it offers a different kind of emotional experience for every listener."

== Original ensemble recording ==
"Todmorden 513" was originally written and recorded for a small electro-acoustic ensemble featuring various overdubbed electric and acoustic guitars, string quartet, recorder, organ, synthesizer, glockenspiel and electronics. The young Swiss composer Tobias Reber and the engineer-musician Philipp Quaet-Faslem assisted Reuter in the electronic realisation of the piece, and were credited as "assistant composers" on the original release. Reuter released this recording on his own Hyperfunction label at the beginning of 2011.

== Orchestral version ==
In the spring of 2012 Reuter streamed his recording of "Todmorden 513" on Facebook and asked for assistance in creating an orchestral version. American conductor and composer Thomas A. Blomster (the director of the Colorado Chamber Orchestra) responded, and began working with Reuter on a full orchestral score. In January 2013, Reuter visited Blomster in Denver, Colorado and the two men worked with the Colorado Chamber Orchestra on a read-through of the initial draft score. Blomster's new orchestration involved a large orchestra with a substantial percussion section (including chimes, "huge sleigh bells" and even a wind machine) plus a "large contingent" of wind instruments as well as strings. Jungerman has commented "this orchestration brings out the melodic dimension of the piece as it is passed from instrument to instrument in ever-changing colors, reminding one strongly of the Klangfarbenmelodie techniques of Berg and Webern early in the 20th century."

Both Reuter and Blomster have labelled the new version of "Todmorden 513" as a concerto for orchestra. Blomster: "There are fifty unique parts or musical lines, one per musician with very little duplication. Each of these parts are solo parts, and demand absolute precision and discipline on the part of each individual performer. At the same time, each part/performer is a part of either a trio or quartet, demanding sensitive chamber playing from the musicians. Finally, each individual musician and trio or quartet are part of the large orchestra that is created by combining the smaller groups together. Markus and I chose not to put any dynamic markings in the score; so the final demand on the orchestra musicians is that they balance themselves, so a tuba or trumpet player must be aware not to overpower a single violin playing their individual part."

Reuter has also stressed the psychological component of the piece, in performance. "When Thomas Blomster and I worked on the orchestration for "Todmorden 513" (we) were looking for a word to summarize the way each part should be played by each instrumentalist. Eventually we came up with the word "normal", which surprised us, but that's really how musical pieces should be performed - at the very least when in the process of getting to know the music."

The orchestral version of "Todmorden 513" was premiered by the Colorado Chamber Orchestra on April 18, 2013 in a concert at the King Center Concert Hall, Auraria Campus, Denver, Colorado. The piece was the second of two compositions played at the concert, the other being Gregory T.S. Walker's Global Solstice which was played as the concert opener.

== Recordings ==
=== Original electro-acoustic version ===
Todmorden 513

Studio album by Markus Reuter
- Released: January 1, 2011
- Genres: Electro-acoustic music, contemporary classical music, experimental music
- Length: 60:54
- Label: Hyperfunction
- Producer: Markus Reuter

Markus Reuter chronology
Trepanation (2006)	Todmorden 513 (2011)

==== Track listing ====
All tracks are written by Markus Reuter (assistant composers: Philipp Quaet-Faslem, Tobias Reber).

No.	Title	Length
1.	"I"	7:43
2.	"II"	7:04
3.	"III"	12:08
4.	"IV"	5:39
5.	"V"	6:00
6.	"VI"	6:29
7.	"VII"	6:59
8.	"VIII"	8:52

==== Personnel ====
Performers:

- Markus Reuter – U8 Touch Guitar, electric guitar, acoustic guitar, synthesizer, organ, glockenspiel, electronics
- Tobias Reber - electronics
- Karina Bellmann, Uta Maria Lempert - violins
- Wiebke Tschöpe – viola
- Juliane Gilbert – cello
- Ulrich Pollmann – recorder
- Frieder Zimmermann – sustainer guitar

Other personnel:

- Markus Reuter - producer
- Bernhard Wöstheinrich, Markus Reuter – executive producers
- Ritxi Ostáriz - art direction, design
- Henry Warwick - liner notes
- Robert Rich - mixing
- Andreu Balius - typography

=== Orchestral version ===
Following their 2013 premiere concert performance of the orchestral version of "Todmorden 513", the Colorado Chamber Orchestra made a studio recording. This has been mastered by Alexander Jöchtl (former chief sound engineer of the Salzburger Festspiele) for future release. David Torn will be overdubbing solo guitar parts on one potential version of this release, doubling the flugelhorn part.
