= The Scent of Crash and Burn =

The Scent Of Crash And Burn

EP by Centrozoon (featuring Tim Bowness)
- Released: 2003
- Recorded: 2002–2003
- Genre: Experimental, electronica
- Label: Burning Shed
- Producer: Lee Fletcher, and Centrozoon

The Scent of Crash and Burn is an EP by Centrozoon (Markus Reuter and Bernhard Wöstheinrich), featuring No-Man singer Tim Bowness as a guest vocalist; the first in a series of releases by this trio configuration which included both CD and vinyl albums, digital-releases, as well as a DVD.

Selected tracks from The Scent of Crash and Burn were reworked (either as remixes or edits) for subsequent releases. For example, the title track was edited by co-producer Lee Fletcher for inclusion on the follow-up album Never Trust the Way You Are.

== Track listing ==
All songs written by Bowness/Reuter/Wöstheinrich

1. "Ten Versions of America" (TRG Radio Edit)
2. "Make Me Forget You"
3. "The Me I Knew"
4. "The Scent of Crash and Burn"
5. "Ten Versions of America"

== Personnel ==
- Tim Bowness – vocals, lyrics
- Markus Reuter – touch guitar
- Bernhard Wöstheinrich – synths and programming
- Philipp Münch – additional arrangements on 01
- Lee Fletcher – drum programming on 02

== Production ==
- Producer: Lee Fletcher, and Centrozoon
- Mixing: Lee Fletcher, (except 05 by Markus Reuter and Lee Fletcher)
- Engineering: Philipp Quaet-Faslem

== Design ==
- Design: Bernhard Wöstheinrich
