= Tú =

Tú may refer to:

- Tú (Canadian band)
- "Tú" (Noelia song), 1999
- "Tú" (Shakira song), 1998
- "Tú", an habanera written by Eduardo Sánchez de Fuentes
- "Tú", a 2016 song by Allison
- "Tú", a 2008 song by Belle Perez
- "Tú", a 1987 song by Juan Luis Guerra from Mientras Más Lo Pienso...Tú
- "Tú", a 2007 song by Jeremías from Un día más en el gran circo
- "Tú", a 2007 song by Kudai from Sobrevive
- "Tú", a 2006 song by Lu from Álbum
- "Tú", a 1991 song by Mecano from Aidalai
- "Tú", a 2010 song by Sara Tunes from Butterfly
- The familiar form of "you" in the Spanish language
- "La Incondicional", a 1989 song by Luis Miguel, sometimes confused by fans as being named "Tú"
- Tú, a Chinese surname

== See also ==
- Tu (disambiguation)
