= This Fragile Moment =

Studio album by This Fragile Moment
- Released: November 2009
- Recorded: 11–14 June 2009
- Genre: Art rock, experimental
- Label: Unsung
- Producer: Markus Reuter; This Fragile Moment

This Fragile Moment is the sole album by the art rock music collective of the same name, released in 2009. This Fragile Moment were a collective including the British singer Toyah Willcox, bass player Chris Wong (of Toyah's other band The Humans), producer and touch guitarist Markus Reuter, and the Estonian duo Fragile (drummer Arvo Urb and guitarist Robert Jürjendal).

The album comprises experimental songs derived largely from live-in-the-studio group improvisations. It was conceived and recorded in Tallinn, Estonia, within several days in June 2009. The album was released on the German label Unsung Records. Though the sleeve notes quote 2010, early copies were sold exclusively via Unsung Records' online store in November 2009.

== Track listing ==
All songs by Arvo Urb, Robert Jürjendal, Toyah Willcox, Markus Reuter, Chris Wong (lyrics by Toyah Willcox)

1. "Stones" – 5:27
2. "Break the Mould" – 5:08
3. "Don't Even Try" – 8:51
4. "Run with Me" – 5:18
5. "Boredom Is a Killer" – 6:07
6. "Fragile" – 4:40
7. "Blow the Pain Away" – 2:30
8. "Born Broken" – 4:50
9. "In Estonia" – 5:06

== Personnel ==
- Toyah Willcox – voice
- Robert Jürjendal – guitar (right channel), electronics
- Arvo Urb – drums, percussion, editing
- Chris Wong – bass guitar
- Markus Reuter – touch guitar (left channel), electronics, production
- This Fragile Moment – production
- Lee Fletcher – production assistance, mastering
- Indreko Anni – engineering
- Ritxi Ostáriz – art direction and design
