= Markus Reuter =

German musician (born 1972)

- Born: 3 September 1972 (age 54)
- Origin: Lippstadt, Germany
- Genres: Art rock, progressive rock, contemporary classical, art pop, loop, process, ambient, improvised
- Occupations: Musician, record producer, instrument designer
- Instruments: U8 Touch Guitar, Warr Guitar, Chapman Stick, laptop computer, guitar, bass guitar, keyboards, mandolin,
- Years active: 1996–present
- Labels: Unsung, Burning Shed, Discipline Global Mobile, Ronin Rhythm, MoonJune
- Website: markusreuter.com

Markus Reuter (born Lippstadt, Germany, 1972) is a German multi-instrumentalist, composer, record producer and instrument designer.

Reuter's work as recording artist, solo performer and collaborator spans (and frequently fuses) electrophonic loop music, contemporary classical music, progressive and art rock, industrial music, world jazz, jazz fusion, pop songs and pure improvisation. Over the course of a two-decade career, he has been a member of multiple bands, ensembles and projects (including centrozoon, Stick Men, Tuner, The Crimson ProjeKct and Europa String Choir) as well as a solo artist. Since 2011 Reuter has begun to establish himself as a contemporary classical composer, starting with the performance and recording of his large-scale orchestral piece Todmorden 513.

A specialist in touch guitar playing, Reuter became known as a leading player of the Warr Guitar and Chapman Stick during the 1990s and 2000s before developing, adopting and marketing his own U8 and U10 Touch Guitar instruments. In collaboration with former King Crimson member Trey Gunn, he runs the Touch Guitar Circle, a teaching and support network for touch guitar players.

As well as further collaborations with artists including Tim Bowness, Lee Fletcher, Ian Boddy and Robert Rich, Reuter has produced records by numerous musicians and released several solo recordings as both performer and composer. He is also part of an artist-owned production consortium which encompasses Iapetus Media, Unsung Productions and Unsung Records.

== Musical style ==
Most of Reuter's performance work to date has evolved from exploring electric touch-style instruments and sound processing. Between 1993 and 1996, he predominantly played Chapman Stick, switching to 8-string Warr Guitar circa 1997. In 2008, he began using his own self-designed range of 8- and 10-string Touch Guitars. A technically skilled player, Reuter performs using a variety of approaches from unprocessed sound and standard technique through to extreme processed textural sounds and drones.

As a performer, Reuter is best known for his work as an art rock musician (partly due to his involvement with multiple projects related to King Crimson and his work in experimental ambient music) but as a keen and flexible collaborator by inclination, his work with other projects has also involved elements of chamber music, jazz, folk and various pop styles depending on context. Since 2011, he has been actively developing a parallel and linked career as a contemporary classical composer.

In terms of composition, Reuter has shown a particular interest in process music, using rules-based algorithmic and serial compositional techniques. He has also worked with generative music, which informs both the harmonic designs of some of his classical compositions (such as Todmorden 513) and his work with the band Tuner and follows various improvisational approaches. Recently, he has been referring to his overall musical approach as "Modus Novus".

Reuter views his ongoing work as an opportunity to educate himself through broad experience and experiment. He has cited the challenges brought to him by long-term musical partners (such as Bernhard Wöstheinrich) as being a particular inspiration.

== Biography and career as musician ==
=== Initial studies, Guitar Craft and university (1975–1996) ===
Markus Reuter began training as a musician in 1975 at the age of three. Initially he studied as a pianist (tutored by Ulrich Pollmann) and later took up classical guitar and mandolin. During his childhood and early teens (up until the age of 16), he performed in concert both as a solo musician and as a member of ensembles and orchestras.

With Pollmann's aid and encouragement Reuter began composing in 1985 at the age of 11 or 12. He was inspired by a variety of influences - classic 1960s and 1970s pop music (The Beatles in particular), classical music (Bach and Messiaen), progressive rock (Mike Oldfield, David Torn, Robert Fripp and King Crimson) and contemporary crossover composers such as David Bedford. During his teens, Reuter studied music history, theory, and analysis with Karlheinz Straetmanns, a composer in the lineage of Harald Genzmer and Paul Hindemith.

In 1991, at the age of 18, Reuter began attending courses in Robert Fripp's Guitar Craft. Tutored by Tony Geballe (and by Fripp himself), he continued to study Guitar Craft until 1998, combining intensive music courses with explorations of the philosophy of George Gurdjieff and J.G. Bennett. Gurdjieff's work - in particular, the Sacred Dances - would have a profound effect on Reuter's own subsequent work.

By his own admission, Reuter was not a particularly disciplined musician in his teens, initially relying on his innate musical talent. His approach changed when he took up the Chapman Stick in early 1993, following discussions with Fripp and inspired by Reuter's own admiration for King Crimson's Stick player Tony Levin. Learning to play both the 10-string and 12-string models of the instrument required a disciplined approach to study and practice, which Reuter adopted and turned to his advantage. At around the same time, he began to develop a serious interest in textural loop music and started to experiment with a form of "instant composition" using a system of out-of-synch looping devices.

In 1993, Reuter began a six-year degree course in psychology at Universität Bielefeld. While at university, Reuter pursued further musical education. Between 1993 and 1996 he studied free improvisation with Gerd Lisken and became a member of Lisken's Chaos Orchester Bielefeld. During 1995 he studied contemporary classical music with Belgian composer and touch guitar (Stick) player Daniel Schell: he also studied Indian music with Ashok Pathak and developed his existing interest in permutation-based compositional principles. In 1996 (while still part-way through his degree course and his Guitar Craft studies) Reuter performed his first complete concert of entirely self-written compositions, and embarked on a career as a professional musician.

=== Solo work ===
The majority of Reuter's solo releases under his own name have consisted of ambient textured music (with hidden processes) recorded using heavily effected touch guitar, Warr Guitar or Chapman Stick, plus laptop. Reuter began recording and releasing this type of music in 1998 - beginning with the Taster album - and has released nine such albums to the present day (including three live recordings from the Crimson ProjeKCt Tour of 2014).

In 2017, Reuter released a very different album - Falling for Ascension, a twelve-tone pointillist suite reworked from several of his teenage compositions (blending his contemporary classical work with his art-rock work, while also exploring post-rock). Credited to "Markus Reuter featuring SONAR & Tobias Reber", it's effectively a Reuter solo album performed by him with a post-minimal Swiss electric guitar ensemble and added electronics. Falling for Ascension was described as "exceptional music for endlessly rewarding drift and ecstatic momentum... ensemble intricacy at its most musically stimulating" in Gapplegate Guitar and Bass Blog.

=== Work as classical composer ===
Although he'd previously composed contemporary classical instrumental pieces as early as 1988 (compositions written for guitar orchestra when he was fifteen), Reuter's formal work as a classical composer began with Todmorden 513. For this work, he applied his ambient process music approach to chamber music in what he intends to be an increasing number of large-scale contemporary classical works for orchestras and chamber ensembles.

In 2011 Reuter released a recording of the small-ensemble version of the piece (featuring his own processed and overdubbed touch guitar plus string quartet, recorder, electric organ, synthesizer, glockenspiel and electronics. In 2013, the work was expanded to a full orchestral arrangement in collaboration with American conductor and composer Thomas A. Blomster. This version (performed by the Colorado Chamber Orchestra) was premiered in Denver, Colorado in April 2013 and has been released on record twice – first as a studio recording in 2014, then as a live recording in 2016. Reviewing the studio recording in Gapplegate Classical-Modern Music Review, Grego Applegate Edwards hailed Todmorden 513 as "sound(ing) like what Morton Feldman might have written had he advanced to a new stage... This, I am confident, is one of the most important orchestral works of our era.... a breakthrough in form and sound."

Reuter has gone on to compose and record further classical pieces:

- the solo piano piece His Last Decade (premiered by Susanne Kessel at the Klavierhaus Klavins on 25 February 2016, as part of her "250 piano pieces for Beethoven" series)
- the electro-acoustic chamber piece Daimon Fu for two flutes, violin, viola, cello, double bass, baritone saxophone, bass clarinet, electric organs, vibraphone, electric guitar, electric bass and drums (premiered in Oldenburg, Germany on 30 October 2016 by Oh Ton Ensemble).
- the electric chamber work Sun Trance for tuned/untuned percussion ensemble, bass clarinet, synthesizer and electric guitar/bass/touch guitar (commissioned by Mannheimer Schlagwerk, premiered on May 23, 2017, in Mannheim, Germany and released as a live recording in October 2017).

=== Projects and collaborations ===
==== centrozoon ====
centrozoon (an improvised music project initiated by fine artist/synth player Bernhard Wöstheinrich) was the first band which Reuter joined on his professional emergence in 1996. It remains one of his main creative outlets to this day. For most of its career centrozoon has been a duo of Reuter and Wöstheinrich, with current third man and multi-instrumentalist/sound-designer Tobias Reber joining in 2008. (The band also included No-Man singer Tim Bowness for a period between 2002 and 2005). The project's music has touched on ambient electronica, free-form experimentalism, sung art pop, progressive rock and electronic dance music. To date, Reuter has released eight albums with centrozoon, plus a number of live and archive releases.

==== Europa String Choir ====
Europa String Choir is an instrumental art rock/contemporary classical chamber ensemble with whom Reuter was active for four years (and for which he remains an associate member) Between 1996 and 2000, Reuter played concerts with the group and recorded two albums, Lemon Crash and Marching Ants.

==== King Crimson-related projects ====
Since 2005, Reuter has been affiliated with several projects related to King Crimson.

In 2005 Reuter began actively collaborating with King Crimson's drummer Pat Mastelotto. The duo released four albums under the band name of Tuner before releasing 2017's Face album as "Pat Mastelotto & Markus Reuter".

In 2010 Reuter joined Mastelotto and Tony Levin in the Stick Men trio (replacing Michael Bernier), with whom he has released eleven studio and live albums plus an EP. In 2011, Stick Men united with the Adrian Belew Power Trio to form the six-piece Crimson ProjeKct and perform King Crimson material from the 1981 to 1995 period. Five of the ProjeKct's concerts have been released as live albums.

In the latter two projects Reuter performs many musical parts originally played by Robert Fripp. He has sometimes been hailed as Fripp's potential successor, despite always downplaying and rejecting this idea when questioned about it.

==== Work within pop music ====
In addition to his work on the art-pop phase of centrozoon (featuring Tim Bowness), Reuter has been a long-term collaborator with producer, songwriter and art-pop musician Lee Fletcher, having met him on a Guitar Craft course in the mid-1990s. Reuter is a featured instrumental performer and general contributor to Fletcher's albums Faith in Worthless Things and The Cracks Within - FiWT Remixes, as well as recording the Islands single (a Mike Oldfield cover under the name of Fletcher|Fletcher|Reuter) and playing on Fletcher's 2017 single The Chancer.

Reuter's work on Tovah's 2008 art-pop album Escapologist not only involved production (in collaboration with Pat Mastelotto) but also all of the album's arrangements.

Since 2015, Reuter has been an associate member of Dutch Rall's synthpop studio project Nocturne Blue, providing touch guitar solos and textures.

==== Work within jazz and jazz fusion ====
Reuter's exploration of jazz and jazz fusion began in 1998 with his work with String Unit, an ambient world-jazz trio which also featured acoustic guitarist Dagobert Böhm and violinist Zoltán Lantos. Reuter remained with the group until 2000, when it released its single album String Unit, under the name of Dagobert Böhm/Zoltan Lantos/Markus Reuter.

Reuter resumed jazz work when he joined the spontaneous electro-acoustic improvisation band Syntony in 2009 (in which he worked with saxophonist Florian Bramböck, trumpeter Luca Calabrese, drummer Georg Tausch and bass guitarist/electronics player Yoshi Hampl). The band released the Scavenger album in 2010.

During 2016 Reuter began collaborating with British guitarist Mark Wingfield and Israeli rhythm section Yaron Stavi and Asaf Sirkis: 2017 saw the release of two jazz fusion albums from these sessions - The Stone House (credited to “Wingfield Reuter Stavi Sirkis”) and Lighthouse (credited to “Wingfield Reuter Sirkis”).

In 2020, Reuter founded Markus Reuter OCULUS, an experimental electric jazz fusion sextet featuring five previous collaborators (David Cross, Fabio Trentini, Asaf Sirkis, Mark Wingfield and Robert Rich). The group released the Nothing is Sacred album in 2020.

==== Further collaborations ====
Reuter has recorded seven albums as an electrophonic duo with British synthesizer player/soundscaper Ian Boddy (plus one with both Boddy and turntablist Nigel Mullaney), three with American experimental guitarist Tim Motzer, two with American ambient electronic composer Robert Rich and two with Zero Ohms (wind/wind-synth instrumentalist Richard Roberts). He has also worked and recorded with German “doombient” musician Stephen Parsick (of ['ramp]).

Reuter has also released several albums under his own name but defined as a “collaborative” series featuring varied other artists. These include 0000 (with bass clarinettist Stefan “Sha” Haslebacher); Star’s End (with Motzer); and How Things Turned Out (with pianist Angelica Sanchez and fellow Guitar Craft alumnus Tony Geballe).

Reuter was also a member of international art pop band This Fragile Moment - fronted by Toyah Willcox and incorporating Estonian duo Fragile (Arvo Urb and Robert Jürjendal) plus Toyah bassist Chris Wong - who recorded a single eponymous album in 2010.

In 2021, Reuter created another new group, Anchor and Burden (named after his 2021 solo album and apparently sharing some conceptual links). With Bernhard Wöstheinrich in the line-up, Reuter acknowledged that Anchor and Burden was in some respects an extension of centrozoon: it also featured Reuter's fellow Touch Guitarist Alexander Dowerk (Zweiton, Van Halo) and drummer Shawn Crowder. The group released four albums during 2021 and 2022 (Weigh Anchor, Clenched Brow, Furrowed Temple, Molten Burden and Feels Like Forever) before Crowder was replaced by Asaf Sirkis for the fifth album, 2023's Kosmonautik Pilgrimage.

== Other musical activities ==
=== Record producer and label owner ===
Since 2002, Markus Reuter has developed his work as a record producer for other artists, including Chrysta Bell, Yoshi Hampl, UMA, Tovah, The Season Standard, Skin Diary, Lake Cisco and The Redundant Rocker. He also served as producer for the Toyah Willcox-related project This Fragile Moment, for which he was also one of the main contributing musicians.

In 2006, Reuter set up three interrelated businesses with his centrozoon partner Bernhard Wöstheinrich. One of these was the media company Iapetus Media, the second was the artist-owned production company Unsung Productions, and the third was the affiliated record label Unsung Records (which would release much of Reuter's subsequent work). Collaborators in Unsung/Iapetus work include Fabio Trentini and Lee Fletcher (Adrian Benavides was also involved until 2012). Benjamin Schäfer has been the engineer for Unsung Productions since 2014, co-producing with Reuter.

=== Teacher ===
Reuter began his work as a teacher in 1998, conducting touch guitar seminars in Spain, Belgium, and the USA. From this work he developed a set of systematic playing techniques and exercises called "The Family", inspired by Guitar Craft and by George Gurdjieff's work on physical movement (in particular, the Sacred Dances). "The Family" was launched as a formal method in 2007.

In 2005, Reuter founded the Touch Guitar Circle, offering expert teaching of touch-guitar playing methods plus a support network for players. Former King Crimson Warr Guitarist Trey Gunn joined in 2010. Reuter continues to offer regular courses in both Europe and America, actively supporting students via continuous online education lessons on technique, composition and the "Modus Novus" music theory.

Between 2002 and 2006 Reuter taught classes in "The Psychology of Creativity" at the University of Applied Sciences, Fulda, Germany.

=== Instrument designer (Touch Guitars) ===
Despite making a name for himself as a leading player of, successively, the Chapman Stick and the Warr Guitar, Reuter eventually admitted to dissatisfaction with both instruments. Deciding to design his own variant on the touch-style guitar, he set up the company Touch Guitars in 2007, intending to apply his knowledge of touch-style playing techniques to the task of producing musical instruments entirely based in the tradition of guitar-building.

The first of these instruments, the U8 Deluxe Touch Guitar, was built by American luthier Ed Reynolds (who also acted as consultant for the project and built ten of the subsequent production models). The prototype was completed in June 2008 and soon became Reuter's own instrument of choice. Touch Guitars currently manufacture three instruments – the U8 and U8 Deluxe Touch Guitar (both 8-string instruments) and the U10 Touch Guitar(a 10-string instrument with a split sound output). The AU8 (a semi-acoustic hollow-body version, aimed at reproducing the sound of a tapped acoustic guitar) followed in 2015.

Several of Reuter's students, including Alexander Dowerk and Erik Emil Eskildsen also play Touch Guitars and have released recordings of music made with the instrument.

== Discography ==
=== Solo recordings ===
- Taster (1998)
- Containment (1998)
- Digitalis (2001)
- The Longest in Terms of Being (2001)
- Older Than God (2003)
- Trepanation (2006)
- Kopfmensch (2011 - free download various project compilation)
- Sultry Kissing Lounge (Crimson ProjeKCt Tour 2014) (2014)
- Sultry Kiss Down Under (Crimson ProjeKCt Tour 2014) (2014)
- Quit Being So Gray (Crimson ProjeKCt Tour 2014) (2014)
- 6 Reflections (2014)
- Mundo Nuevo (2015)
- Fool of Music (2016 - free download various project compilation)
- Live in Pomona 2016 (2016)
- Falling for Ascension (featuring SONAR and Tobias Reber) (2017)
- Containment (Official Bootleg Remastered 2017) (2017)
- Live in Morelia 2016 (2017)
- Monde, Vol. 1 (2019)
- Monde, Vol. 2 (2019)
- Monde, Vol. 3 (2019)
- Gratitude, Vol. 1 (2020)
- Gratitude, Vol. 2 (2021)
- Anchor and Burden (2021)
- The Coming Dawn (2022)
- Stream for Consciousness Vol. 1 (2023)
- Stream for Consciousness Vol. 2 (2023)
- Stream for Consciousness Vol. 3 (2023)

=== Classical recordings ===
- Markus Reuter: Todmorden 513 (2011)
- Colorado Chamber Orchestra: Todmorden 513 (Concerto for Orchestra by Markus Reuter) (2014)
- Colorado Chamber Orchestra: Todmorden 513 (World Premiere Performance) (2016)
- Mannheimer Schlagwerk featuring Markus Reuter: Sun Trance (World-Premiere Performance) (2017)
- Matangi Quartet: String Quartet No. 1 ‘Heartland’ (2019)

=== Recordings as group member ===
==== with centrozoon ====
- Blast (2000 - remastered version with bonus track issued 2008, reissued again on vinyl in 2017 with two bonus tracks)
- Sun Lounge Debris (2001)
- The Divine Beast EP (2001)
- centrophil EP (2002)
- The Cult of: Bibbiboo (2002)
- The Scent of Crash and Burn EP (2003)
- Never Trust the Way You Are (2005)
- Angel Liquor (2006)
- Never Trust the Things They Do (2006)
- Lovefield (2007)
- Vacuum Love (5-volume series, 2007)
- Boner (2012)
- Fire (live) (2012)
- The Room of Plenty (live) (2014)
- 217 (ongoing multi-volume live series, 2017)
- eisprung (2020)

==== with Europa String Choir ====
- Lemon Crash (2000)
- Marching Ants (2004)

==== with This Fragile Moment ====
- This Fragile Moment (2010)

==== with Tuner ====
- Totem (2005, remastered 2008)
- Pole (2007)
- Müüt (2008)
- ZWAR (2009)
- Face (2017)

==== with Stick Men ====
- Absalom EP (2011)
- Open (2012)
- Deep (2013)
- Power Play (2013)
- Supercollider, Disc 1: Collider (Best of 2010-2014) (compilation, 2014)
- Supercollider, Disc 2: Unleashed Live Improvs 2013 (2014)
- Midori: Live In Tokyo – First Show (featuring David Cross) (2015)
- Midori: Live In Tokyo – Second Show (featuring David Cross) (2015)
- Scored Play-Alongs (stripped-down multitrack recordings for student playalongs, 2016)
- Prog Noir (2016 – version with bonus tracks released 2017. 5.1 and quad mix released 2019)
- KOLLEKTED (promotional CD, 2017)
- KONNEKTED (download compilation, 2017)
- Roppongi - Live in Tokyo 2017, Show 1 (featuring Mel Collins) (2017)
- Roppongi - Live in Tokyo 2017, Show 2 (featuring Mel Collins) (2017)
- PANAMERICA (Disc 1): Improvs (Bolivia, Argentina, Brazil) (featuring David Cross) (2019)
- PANAMERICA (Disc 2): Suites (Argentina, Peru, Uruguay, Chile) (featuring David Cross) (2019)
- PANAMERICA (Discs 3&4): Full Show (Costa Rica) (featuring David Cross) (2019)
- PANAMERICA (Disc 5): Soundscapes (Argentina, Mexico, Guatemala) (featuring David Cross) (2019)
- PANAMERICA Bonus Tracks (featuring David Cross) (2019)
- OWARI (featuring Gary Husband) (2021)
- Tentacles EP (2022)

==== with The Crimson ProjeKCt ====
- The Crimson ProjeKct - Official Bootleg Live 2012 (2012)
- The Crimson ProjeKct - Live in Tokyo (3-volume series, 2013)
- The Crimson ProjeKct - Live in Japan (InsideOut Records, 2014)

==== with Nocturne Blue ====
- Circle Round the Synthetic Sun (2015)
- The In-Between EP (2015)
- I Came For the Light and Stayed For the Shadows (2016)
- Under Covers (just for fun) (ongoing covers album, 2017)
- Outside the Transcend EP (2017)

==== with Markus Reuter OCULUS ====
- Nothing is Sacred (2020)

==== with Anchor and Burden ====
- Weigh Anchor (2021)
- Clenched Brow (2021)
- Folded Temple (2021)
- Molten Burden (2022)
- Feels Like Forever (2022)
- Kosmonautik Pilgrimage (2023)
- Extinction Level (2024)
- Afterglow (2024)

=== Collaborative recordings ===
==== ”Markus Reuter featuring...” series ====
- Markus Reuter featuring Sha: 0000 (2011)
- Markus Reuter featuring Tim Motzer: Star's End (2011)
- Markus Reuter featuring Angelica Sanchez and Tony Geballe: How Things Turned Out (2016)
- Markus Reuter featuring Fabio Trentini and Asaf Sirkis: Truce (2020)
- Markus Reuter featuring Fabio Trentini and Asaf Sirkis: Truce 2 (2022)

==== Markus Reuter & Ian Boddy ====
- Distant Rituals (1999 - credited to "Ian Boddy & Markus Reuter")
- Pure (2003 - credited to "Markus Reuter & Ian Boddy")
- Dervish (2009 - credited to "Markus Reuter & Ian Boddy")
- Unwound (2010 - credited to "Ian Boddy & Markus Reuter")
- Colour Division (2013 - credited to "Ian Boddy & Markus Reuter")
- Memento (2017 - credited to "Markus Reuter & Ian Boddy")
- Stay (2017 - credited to "Ian Boddy & Markus Reuter")

==== Ian Boddy, Markus Reuter, Nigel Mullaney ====
- Triptych (2001)

==== Markus Reuter & Robert Rich ====
- Eleven Questions (2007)
- Lift a Feather to the Flood (2017)
- Flood Expeditions: Farmington CT, 15 May 2018 (2018)
- Flood Expeditions: Streamside, 17 May 2018 (2018)
- Flood Expeditions: The Gatherings, 19 May 2018 (2018)

==== Tim Motzer & Markus Reuter ====
- Descending (2010)
- Space is the Place (2016)

==== Markus Reuter & Zero Ohms ====
- The Sun is Just the Sun, But the Stars They Call the Heavens (2011)
- From Worlds Unseen a Light Yet Streams a Sound Replete (2015)

==== Other collaborations ====
- Dagobert Böhm, Zoltan Lantos, Markus Reuter: String Unit (2000)
- Markus Reuter & ['ramp]: Ceasing to Exist (2007)
- Syntony: Scavenger (2010)
- Stephen Parsick & Markus Reuter: Lament (2012)
- Wingfield Reuter Stavi Sirkis: The Stone House (2017)
- Wingfield Reuter Sirkis: Lighthouse (2017)
- Reuter Motzer Grohowski: Shapeshifters (2020)
- Thorsten Quaeschning with Markus Reuter: Behind Closed Doors 1 (2020)
- Thorsten Quaeschning with Markus Reuter and Shawn Crowder: Behind Closed Doors 2 (2020)
- Gary Husband & Markus Reuter: Music of our Times (2020)
- Markus Reuter & Stefano Castagna: Sea of Hopeless Angels (2023)

=== Work with Lee Fletcher ===
- Lee Fletcher (featuring Markus Reuter & Lisa Fletcher): Faith in Worthless Things (2012)
- Lee Fletcher (featuring Markus Reuter & Lisa Fletcher): The Cracks Within - FiWT Remixes (remix mini-album, 2013)
- Fletcher|Fletcher|Reuter: Islands single (2013)
- Lee Fletcher: The Chancer single (2017)

=== Guest appearances ===
- Dago, Sounds for a Blue Planet (2001 - credited as performer)
- Tim Bowness, My Hotel Year (2004 - plays touch guitar on and co-wrote "The Me I Knew" and "I Once Loved You")
- Kuha, Telekineettinen Testilaboratorio (2005 - plays touch guitar)
- Star of Ash, The Thread (2008 - arranger, plays touch guitar)
- Stefano Panunzi, "A Rose" (2009 - plays Warr guitar)
- Scott McGill, Percy Jones, Ritchie DeCarlo (2010 - plays touch guitar)
- Star of Ash, Lakhesis (2010 - arranger, plays touch guitar)
- Herd of Instinct, Herd Of Instinct (2011 - plays touch guitar and loops on "Anamnesis" and "Possession")
- Pat Mastelotto & Tobias Ralph: ToPaRaMa (2014 - plays touch guitar)

=== Work as producer ===
- Show Of Exaggeration, Show Of Exaggeration (2003)
- The Redundant Rocker, Collider (2005)
- UMA, Civitas Soli (2008)
- Tovah, Escapologist (2008 - producer/arranger)
- The Season Standard, Squeeze Me Ahead Of Line (2008)
- This Fragile Moment, This Fragile Moment (2009)
- The Redundant Rocker, Heart (2009)
- Yoshi Hampl, Water Dealer (2009)
- Skin Diary, Skin Diary (2010)
- Moonbound, Peak Of Eternal Light (2010 - co-producer)
- Chrysta Bell, Strange Darling (unreleased)
- Lake Cisco, Permanent Transient (2011)
- Zweiton, Form (2012)
- Adrian Benavides, Same Time Next Life (2012)
- Specimen 13, Echosystem EP (2012)
- Namgar, Dawn of the Foremothers (2013)
- Pavlov3, Curvature-Induced Symmetry... Breaking (2015)
- Stick Men, Prog Noir (2016)
- Yang, The Failure of Words (2017)
- Gentle Knife, Clock Unwound (2017)
- Stephan Thelen, Fractal Guitar (2018)
- Frank Schätzing, Taxi Galaxi (2019)
