= 8 Armed Monkey =

Studio album by KTU
- Released: September 27, 2005
- Recorded: April 2004
- Venues: Shibuya Eggman, Tokyo and Nosturi, Helsinki
- Genres: Progressive rock, experimental music
- Length: 43:05
- Label: Thirsty Ear

KTU chronology
| 8 Armed Monkey (2005) | Quiver (2009) |

Professional ratings
Review scores
| Source | Rating |
|---|---|
| Allmusic | 3.5/5 stars |

8 Armed Monkey is the debut album by KTU. It was drawn from the group's first few live performances in Japan and Finland, and released in 2005.

== Track listing ==
| No. | Title | Writer(s) | Length |
|---|---|---|---|
| 1. | "Sumu" | Pohjonen | 8:43 |
| 2. | "Optikus" | Pohjonen | 8:36 |
| 3. | "Sineen" | Pohjonen, Kosminen | 7:23 |
| 4. | "Absinthe" | Gunn, Mastelotto | 8:21 |
| 5. | "Keho" | KTU | 10:02 |
| 6. | "Tachi" (Japanese CD edition only) | KTU | 8:11 |

== Personnel ==
- Kimmo Pohjonen - accordion, voice
- Samuli Kosminen - accordion samples, voice samples
- Pat Mastelotto - drums and rhythmic devices
- Trey Gunn - Warr guitar
