= Robert Jürjendal =

Estonian guitar player and composer (born 1966)

- Born: January 10, 1966 (age 60)
- Origin: Estonia
- Instrument: Guitar

Robert Jürjendal (born 10 January 1966) is an Estonian guitar player and composer.

== Biography ==
He trained as a classical guitarist, later studied Robert Fripp's Guitar Craft and learned to play loop music.

Jürjendal is a member of Weekend Guitar Trio, UMA, Fragile, The Fragile Moment. The trio won the 1995 First prize at Lausanne International Guitar festival. He has worked with Riho Sibul, Tõnis Mägi, Tim Bowness, Siiri Sisask, David Rothenberg, Petri Kuljuntausta, Kärt Johanson, Celia Roose, Miguel Noya, Paul Godwin. He was composer for the films: The Measure of Man (documentary) (2011), Teispool vihma (short) (2004).

== Instruments and gear ==
As an experimental guitarist and composer, Robert uses a wide variety of instruments and effects to help him create musical textures that set the mood of his compositions. In an interview with Guitar Moderne, Robert revealed some of the equipment he most often uses. His main guitar is an Ovation semi acoustic steel guitar equipped with a MIDI pickup that he uses with a Roland VG-8 guitar processor. He also uses this processor with a Breedlove C15 Custom semi-acoustic guitar. In addition to these guitars and processor, Robert also uses several guitar effects and pedals. In the interview he revealed that he uses an E-bow, Electro Harmonix HOG, Roland Space Echo, and a Boss RC50 Loop Station.

In addition to these effects, Robert also uses a Neunaber Audio Wet reverb and is currently listed as an endorsed artist on their website.

== Discography ==
- Eternal Return "Once Only" (2020) NEWdOG Records
- Robert Jürjendal, Miguel Noya "The Power of Distance" (2019) NEWdOG Records
- Noya, Godwin, Jürjendal "Samliku" (2018) NEWdOG Records
- UMA Meeting Unknown (2012)
- Quartet For The End Of Time Modus Novus (2012)
- Guido Kangur, Andi Pupato, UMA Eesti metsa lugu (2011)
- Slow Electric Slow Electric (2011)
- Riho Sibul ja sõbrad Mets on rohkem, kui mõistame mõõta (2010)
- UMA Hymn To Undiscovered Land (2010)
- Weekend Guitar Trio Coca Inca (2009)
- UMA Civitas Soli (2008)
- Robert Jürjendal, Petri Kuljuntausta, David Rothenberg 3Corners Of The World (2008)
- David Rothenberg, John Wieczorek, Robert Jürjendal Soo-Roo (2004)
- Kärt Johanson Seitse Une Nägu (2004)
- Fragile Õunapuu Osakas (2000)
