= ToPaRaMa =

Studio album by Pat Mastelotto & Tobias Ralph
- Released: 17 June 2014
- Recorded: November 2013
- Label: 7d Media Records
- Producer: Pat Mastelotto

Professional ratings
Review scores
Source	Rating
All About Jazz	(not rated)

ToPaRaMa is a collaborative album by American drummers Pat Mastelotto (member of King Crimson) and Tobias Ralph (member of Adrian Belew's band). It features many other musicians, such as bassist Tony Levin, keyboardist Roy Powell and guitarist Markus Reuter.

== Track listing ==
1. "Willie's in the Backyard"
2. "NY5"
3. "Mama Will Bark"
4. "Little People"
5. "Sing Sang Sung"
6. "Floor Over Heaven"
7. "Up Heavy"
8. "New O"
9. "Moo Baba"
10. "BaBaBoom"
11. "Rendezvous with Rama pt1"
12. "OM"
13. "Bad Ass Van, Man"

== Personnel ==
- Pat Mastelotto – drums, percussion, sound design
- Tobias Ralph – drums, cowbell, Rhodes
- Markus Reuter – U8 Touch guitar
- Roy Powell – Rhodes and Moog samples
- Lorenzo Feliciati– bass, keys, strings
- Tony Levin – upright bass
- David Rothenberg – clarinet
- Angelica Sanchez – piano
- Bernhard Wöstheinrich – soundscapes
- Bill Munson – vocals, samples
- Leashya Padma Munson – vocals, samples
- Robert Fisher – spoken words
