= KTU (band) =

Finnish-American musical supergroup

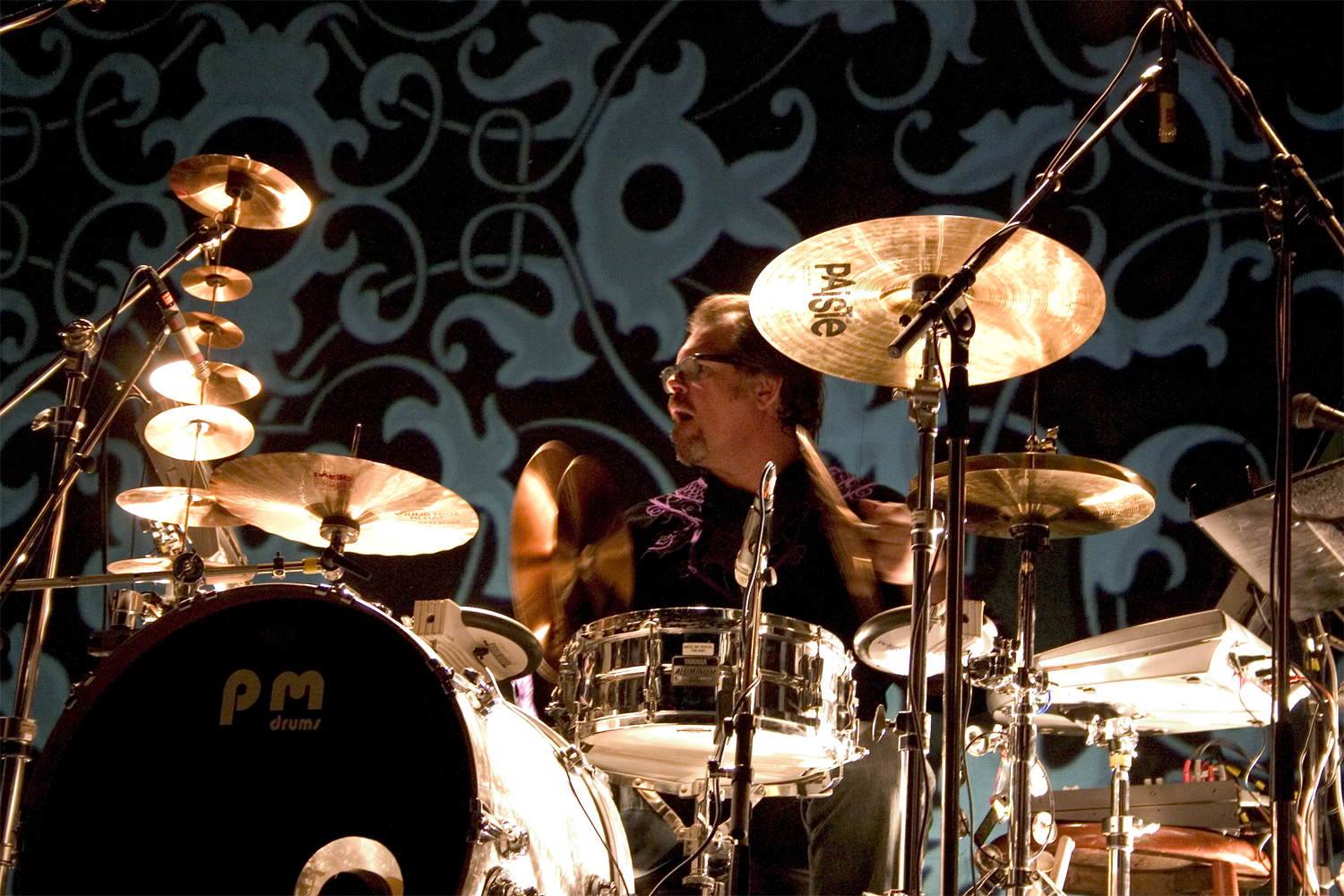
- Pat Mastelotto performing with KTU in 2005

Background information
- Genres: Progressive rock; experimental
- Years active: 2004–present
- Members: Trey Gunn; Pat Mastelotto; Kimmo Pohjonen
- Past members: Samuli Kosminen
- Website: KTU on Kimmo Pohjonen's official website

KTU (pronounced K2) is a Finnish-American progressive/experimental musical supergroup. In 2004, Trey Gunn and Pat Mastelotto of the duo TU started collaborating with Kimmo Pohjonen and Samuli Kosminen of the duo Kluster.

== History ==
Pohjonen and Kosminen formed Kluster in 2001. They are known as adventurers in their fields and their partnership takes accordion music to new and unexplored territory. On stage, Kosminen reproduces samples of Pohjonen's accordion and voice percussively using electronic drum pads. Samuli also drums with the Icelandic band Múm. Other recent Kluster collaborations include the project Uniko with the Kronos Quartet.

Percussionist Pat Mastelotto and touch guitarist Trey Gunn have enjoyed successful careers with the band King Crimson. The two met at Peter Gabriel's Real World Studios before touring with David Sylvian and Robert Fripp. As the duo TU, they have released one studio album.

Seeds for KTU took root at SXSW in Austin, Texas in March 1999, when Pohjonen shared a billing with Mastelotto/Gunn/Robert Fripp's ProjeKcts Three at the Electric Lounge. Plans for the quartet took shape over the next five years.

KTU rehearsals and the World Premiere concert took place in Helsinki at the Nosturi club in April 2004, followed by four concerts in Tokyo; recordings from these shows comprise the debut record 8 Armed Monkey, released in 2005. Live concerts continued in 2005 with headlining festival appearances in Germany at the Moers Festival, Kulturzelt, Kulturarena, as well as FMM Sines in Portugal. In 2007, KTU debuted their live show in the US and Mexico as a trio (minus Kosminen, who continues to contribute to the band on occasion).

The group's second album, Quiver, was released in March 2009.

== Band members ==
Current

- Trey Gunn (Warr Guitar)
- Pat Mastelotto (rhythmic devices, beats, noises, percussion)
- Kimmo Pohjonen (chromatic button accordion, voice)

Past

- Samuli Kosminen (samples)

== Discography ==
- 8 Armed Monkey (2005)
- Quiver (2009)
