= Jamyangiin Urantögs =

Mongolian singer

Jamyangiin Urantögs (Mongolian: Жамъянгийн Урантөгс) is a Mongolian singer. She was born into the family of Mongolian composer and multi-instrumentalist Ts. Jamyan. In the western Mongolian city of Uliastai, she studied the yatag, a traditional Mongolian zither, at the Music and Dance College in Ulaanbaatar. Later, she went to Moscow to receive a degree in composition at the Moscow Pedagogical State University.

Urantögs was a 2002 winner of Moscow's 21st-Century Second International Contest. She toured with Buryat and Mongolian music group Namgar in Norway, China, and Malaysia. She sings and plays on the debut album of Namgar, "Hatar" (2002).

She was teaching theory and solfeggio at the University of Culture in Ulaanbaatar, Mongolia, for some time and edited her father's major musicological book, released in 2007.

She came to the USA in the mid-2000s with Badma-Khanda's Buryat Mongolian Band to play with trombonist Roswell Rudd and toured with Rudd and the band across the US, playing at Carnegie Hall in November 2006. She became an independent performer after the band went back to Russia.

Her 2008 activities included collaboration with Chicago bass player Frank Luther, with Peter Buettner and T. Xiques joining them on tour.
