= HoBoLeMa =

Instrumental supergroup (2008–2017)

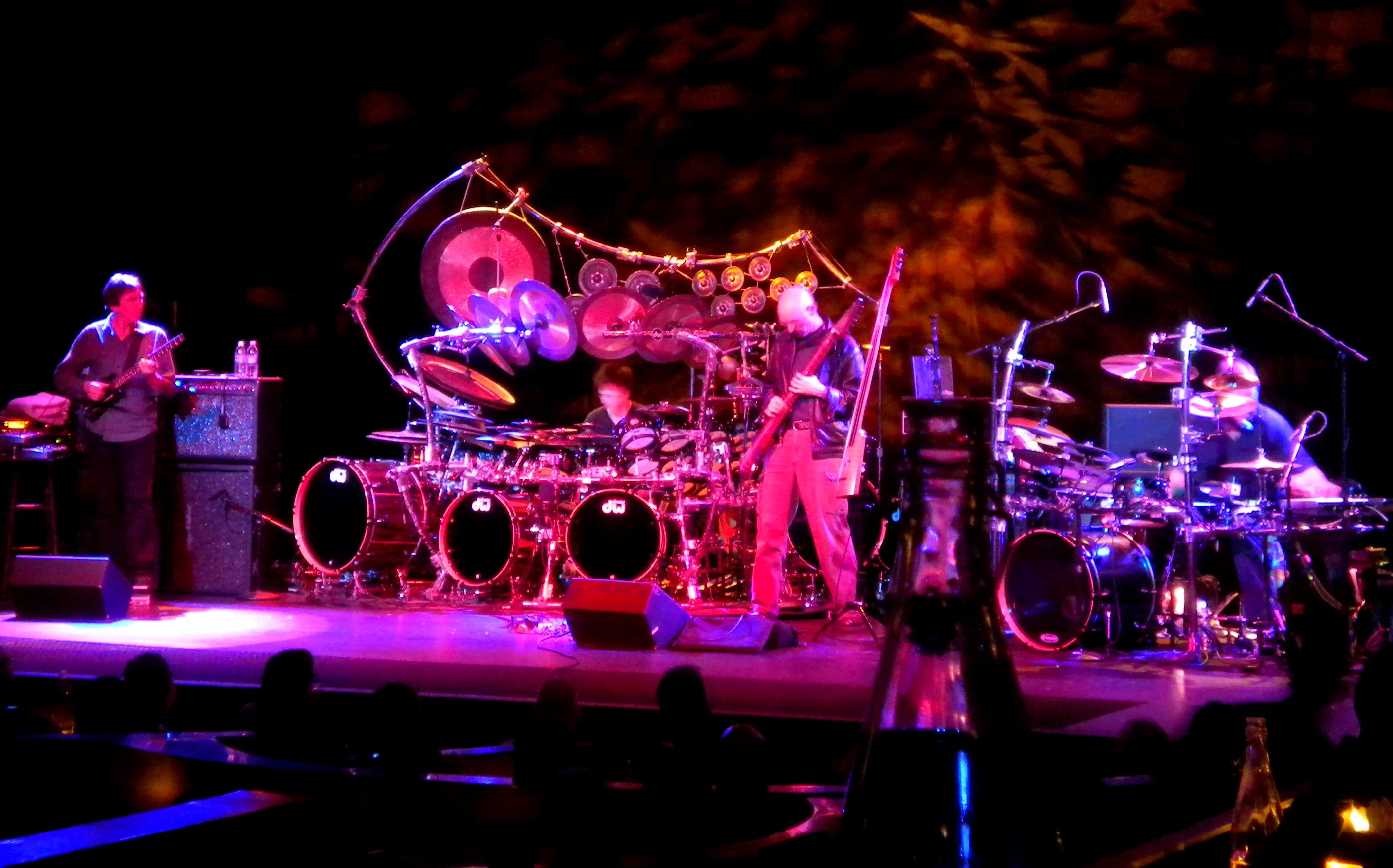
- HoBoLeMa performing in Seattle in 2010

Background information
- Genres: Progressive rock, jazz rock
- Years active: 2008–2017
- Spinoff of: King Crimson, U.K., California Guitar Trio
- Members: Allan Holdsworth; Terry Bozzio; Tony Levin; Pat Mastelotto

HoBoLeMa was a progressive rock supergroup which consisted of Allan Holdsworth, Terry Bozzio, Tony Levin and Pat Mastelotto. The group toured Japan in November 2008, the West Coast of the United States in January 2010 and Europe in April and May 2010. The name "HoBoLeMa" comes from combining the first two letters of each of their last names.

HoBoLeMa performed shows without any written music, improvising multiple live sets with breaks in between. While most of the drums were improvised and acoustic in nature, Mastelotto used some electronic drums and audio samples, Bozzio performed on a large drum kit with several gongs, Levin played the Chapman Stick and an NS electric upright bass, while Holdsworth improvised jazz guitar solos and droning chords over the top.

In January 2009, GuitarPlayer Magazine interviewed all four members of the group about the process of improvisation, and recorded three excerpts from a show in Oakland, California, and posted them online.

== Band members ==
- Allan Holdsworth – guitar
- Terry Bozzio – drums/percussion
- Tony Levin – Chapman Stick/electric upright bass
- Pat Mastelotto – drums/percussion
