= Pat Mastelotto =

American rock drummer and record producer (born 1955)

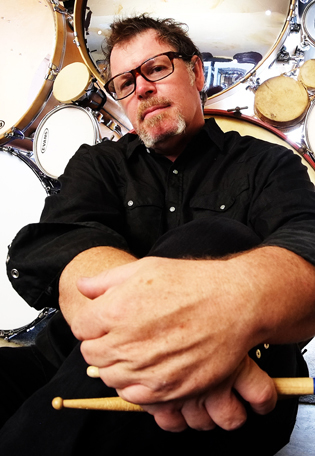
- Mastelotto in 2017

Background information
- Born: Lee Patrick Mastelotto; September 10, 1955 (age 71); Chico, California, U.S.
- Genres: Progressive rock; jazz fusion; pop rock; progressive metal
- Occupation: Musician
- Instruments: Drums, electronic percussion
- Member of: Tuner, Stick Men, O.R.k.
- Formerly of: Mr. Mister, HoBoLeMa, The Rembrandts, XTC, King Crimson
- Website: PatMastelotto.com

Lee Patrick Mastelotto (born September 10, 1955) is an American rock drummer and record producer. He has been a member of King Crimson, Stick Men, Mr. Mister and O.R.k., as well as working as a session drummer with XTC, The Pointer Sisters and The Rembrandts (including well known Friends theme song "I'll Be There for You"), among others. In addition, he has led or co-led other projects including Mastica, Tuner, TU and The Mastelottos.

For King Crimson, he initially formed part of the "Double Trio" lineup from 1994 to 1997, working with Bill Bruford as part of a double-drumkit arrangement. Mastelotto, later, worked both solo and in various configurations with subsequent drummers Gavin Harrison, Bill Rieflin and Jeremy Stacey.

Mastelotto is a pioneer and continuing developer of a mixed acoustic-and-electronic drumming approach which he refers to as "traps and buttons", and which incorporates techniques and methods from rock, pop and electronic dance music styles. As well as being a drummer, he works as a producer, engineer and mixer, working extensively with digital audio workstations.

== Career ==
=== Early years and Mr. Mister ===
Mastelotto was born in Chico, California. He started playing the drums at the age of 10; by the time he was 16 he was playing in popular local bands and while still in high school commuted several hours to Lake Tahoe for gigs. Moving to Los Angeles in the mid-1970s, Mastelotto worked for many bands and as a studio session drummer. In this capacity he worked for Martin Briley, Holly Knight, Scandal, Al Jarreau, The Pointer Sisters, Patti LaBelle, Kenny Loggins, Martika, Danny Wilde and Holly Penfield as well as playing drums on the double platinum album Rockland by Canadian rock musician Kim Mitchell.

In 1982 Mastelotto was a founding member of Mr. Mister. The band had a number one album, Welcome to the Real World, and two number one singles, "Broken Wings" and "Kyrie". They recorded four albums, with the fourth, Pull, recorded in 1989–1990 but remaining unreleased until late 2010.

His tenure with Mr. Mister was followed by more session work for bands such as XTC, The Sugarcubes, Hall & Oates, Cock Robin, The Rembrandts, Jude Cole, Eddie Money, Tina Arena, Matthew Sweet, Julia Fordham, Robyn Hitchcock and David Sylvian. In 1991 Mastelotto co-produced Peter Kingsbery's first solo album before being asked to join King Crimson.

=== King Crimson ===
He was the first of two drummers hired for the "Double Trio" line-up of the mid-1990s, the second being previous long-term King Crimson drummer Bill Bruford. Mastelotto and Bruford operated as parallel drummers for the Double Trio, playing different styles and parts which sometimes intermeshed and sometimes worked separately. Following Bruford's departure in 1997, Mastelotto became the band's sole drummer, working mostly on the electronic Roland V-Drums set and bringing in simultaneous/triggered electronic drum loops and textures based on his interest in intelligent dance music and drum and bass. For King Crimson's 2008 lineup, the band returned to a double-drummer arrangement with Mastelotto now joined by Gavin Harrison.

For the period of King Crimson activity lasting from 2013 to 2021 (the "Seven Headed Beast" and "Three over Five" line-ups), Mastelotto played as part of a three-drummer arrangement, initially with Harrison and Bill Rieflin, and subsequently with Harrison and Jeremy Stacey. In each of these setups, Mastelotto also took on an extended percussionist role incorporating multiple sound effects, samples and programs (taking on something of the function played by percussionist/"allsorts" contributor Jamie Muir in the 1972 King Crimson).

To date, Mastelotto has appeared on three King Crimson studio albums (Thrak, The ConstruKction of Light and The Power to Believe, released between 1995 and 2003), one mini-album, two EPs and numerous live releases between 1995 and 2022.

=== King Crimson-related ===
During, and in parallel to, his King Crimson work, Mastelotto has been an integral part of several King Crimson-related bands. He produced, edited, mixed and played on the ProjeKct 3 and ProjeKct 4 releases by the band's "ProjeKcts" subgroupings, playing a particularly dominant role on the IDM-influenced ProjeKct 3.

Mastelotto also played with League of Crafty Guitarists who formed Fripp adjacent bands; one was California Guitar Trio. Along with Tony Levin and CGT, such pieces as Mahavishnu Orchestra covers were done.

Mastelotto currently works with King Crimson bass/Chapman Stick player Tony Levin and centrozoon's touch guitarist Markus Reuter in the art rock trio Stick Men. He is also a member of the progressive/experimental bands TU (with fellow King Crimson alumnus Trey Gunn), KTU (with Gunn, Kimmo Pohjonen and Samuli Kosminen), and Tuner (a trio with Markus Reuter and Trey Gunn).

Mastelotto was one of the two drummers in the Crimson ProjeKct, a six-piece band which merged Stick Men with the Adrian Belew Power Trio in order to play King Crimson music from the 1980s to 2000s periods. In conjunction with engineer/programmer Bill Munyon, Mastelotto formed the IDM project BPM&M (which to date has recorded one album, 2001's 'XtraKcts & ArtifaKcts', which featured or sampled many King Crimson members and associates). In early 2021 he released a new album, A Romantic's Guide to King Crimson, with his wife Deborah on lead vocals, credited to The Mastelottos. The album featured reworked versions of twelve King Crimson songs, deliberately re-arranged in a more popular style in order to accent the group's songwriting and its gentler side.

=== O.R.k. ===
In 2015, Mastelotto joined Carmelo Pipitone (guitarist of Italian band Marta sui Tubi), Lorenzo Esposito Fornasari (singer and keyboard player with Berserk! and Obake) and Colin Edwin (former bass player with Porcupine Tree) in a new heavy progressive rock band called O.R.k. Their first album, "Inflamed Rides", was released the same year and was followed in 2017 by Soul of an Octopus, in 2019 by Ramagehead (with artwork by Adam Jones of Tool) and in 2022 by Screamnasium.

=== Other projects ===
Mastelotto's other projects include Mastica (an Americana/art-rock trio with Mark "Gum B." Williams of Poi Dog Pondering/Alejandro Escovedo band and Monica 'MonKey' Champion from Baboon Orchestra), and M.P.TU (with Little Feat guitarist Phil Brown, singer Malford Milligan and Spirit/Firefall/Heart bassist Mark Andes). He has continued to guest with Jay Terrien, Cock Robin, drummer Terry Bozzio, Mecca, Herd of Instinct, Tony Levin and the California Guitar Trio, and has contributed to major network television themes.

Since moving to Austin, Texas, Mastelotto has worked with Austinites Storyville, Abra Moore, ...And You Will Know Us by the Trail of Dead and theremin player Pamelia Kurstin. In 2007 Mastelotto went on tour with The Flower Kings in Europe supporting their album The Sum Of No Evil, followed by an appearance at the enormous Creation of Peace festival in Kazan, Russia, with Adrian Belew, Tony Levin and Eddie Jobson. This was followed by another new project, HoBoLeMa, with Levin, Bozzio and Allan Holdsworth.

In 2014, he released a collaborative album with Tobias Ralph called ToPaRaMa. He played on Lucid, the solo album by The Fierce and the Dead guitarist Matt Stevens.

== Discography ==
Year	Projects	Title
1983	Martin Briley	One Night with a Stranger
1984	Mr. Mister	I Wear the Face
1985	Mr. Mister	Welcome to the Real World
1987	Mr. Mister	Go On...
1989	XTC	Oranges & Lemons
2010	Mr. Mister	Pull (Recorded 1989–1990)
1994	King Crimson	Vrooom
1995	King Crimson	THRAK
1995	King Crimson	B'Boom: Live in Argentina
1996	King Crimson	Thrakattak
1998	ProjeKct Four	West Coast Live
1998	ProjeKct Four	Live in San Francisco/The Roar of P4
1999	ProjeKct Three	Masque
1999	ProjeKct Three	Live in Austin, TX
1999	King Crimson	The ProjeKcts
1999	King Crimson	The Deception of the Thrush: A Beginners' Guide to ProjeKcts
2000	Bozzio / Mastelotto	Bozzio / Mastelotto
2000	ProjeKct X	Heaven and Earth
2000	Mastica	99
2000	King Crimson	The ConstruKction of Light
2000	King Crimson	Heavy ConstruKction
2001	King Crimson	Level Five
2001	King Crimson	Vrooom Vrooom
2001	BPM&M	XtraKcts & ArtifaKcts
2002	Rhythm Buddies (TU)	Thunderbird Suite
2002	Mastica	MasTicAttack
2002	California Guitar Trio with Tony Levin and Pat Mastelotto	CG3+2
2002	King Crimson	Happy with What You Have to Be Happy With
2003	King Crimson	The Power to Believe
2003	King Crimson	EleKtrik: Live in Japan
2003	TU	TU
2005	TU	Official Bootleg
2005	Tuner	TOTEM
2005	KTU	8 Armed Monkey
2007	Tuner	POLE
2007	M.P.TU	M.P.TU
2008	Tuner	MÜÜT
2008	Pat Mastelotto & Pamelia Kurstin	Tunisia
2009	Tuner	ZWAR
2009	KTU	Quiver
2009	Stick Men	Stick Men [A special edition]
2010	Stick Men	Soup
2011	TU	Live In Russia
2011	Stick Men	Absalom EP
2011	Stick Men	Live In Montevideo 2011
2011	Stick Men	Live In Buenos Aires 2011
2011	The Flower Kings	Tour Kaputt
2012	Stick Men	Open
2013	Stick Men	Deep
2013	The Crimson Projekct	Official Bootleg Live 2012
2014	Matt Stevens (of The Fierce and the Dead)	Lucid
2014	Stick Men	Power Play
2014	Stick Men	Unleashed: Live Improvs 2013
2014	The Crimson Projekct	Live In Tokyo
2014	Pat Mastelotto, Tobias Ralph	ToPaRaMa
2015	KoMaRa	KoMaRa
2015	O.R.k	Inflamed Rides
2015	King Crimson	Live at the Orpheum
2015	King Crimson	Live EP 2014 (Vinyl Cyclops Picture Disc)
2016	King Crimson	Live In Toronto
2016	King Crimson	Radical Action to Unseat the Hold of Monkey Mind
2016	Stick Men feat. David Cross	Midori: Live In Tokyo
2016	Stick Men	Prog Noir
2017	O.R.k	Soul of an Octopus
2017	King Crimson	Heroes - Live In Europe, 2016
2017	Tuner	FACE
2017	King Crimson	Live in Chicago
2017	Stick Men feat. Mel Collins	Roppongi - Live In Tokyo 2017
2019	O.R.k.	Ramagehead
2020	David Cross and Peter Banks	Crossover
2021	The Mastelottos	A Romantic's Guide to King Crimson
2021	Frost*	Day And Age
2023	Tu-Ner	T-1 Contact Information
2024	Tu-Ner	T-2 For Lovers
2025	O.R.k	Firehose of Falsehoods
2025	Komara	Komara II
