= Quiver (KTU album) =

Studio album by KTU
- Released: 2009
- Recorded: 2007–2008
- Studio: The Zone, Dripping Springs, Texas; 7Directions, Seattle; Seawolf Studios, Helsinki.
- Genre: Progressive rock, experimental music
- Length: 45:32
- Label: Rockadillo
- Producer: KTU

KTU chronology
8 Armed Monkey (2005)	Quiver (2009)

Professional ratings
Review scores
Source	Rating
Allmusic	3/5 stars

Quiver is the second studio album of the band KTU. Songs from this album were performed at the "Creating of Peace" festival in Kazan, Russia, in late 2008.

== Track listing ==
1. "Fragile Sun" – 1:40
2. "Kataklasm" – 5:08
3. "Nano" – 4:43
4. "Quiver" – 3:15
5. "Purga" – 5:44
6. "Womb" – 3:43
7. "Wasabi Fields" – 4:01
8. "Jacaranda" – 4:01
9. "Aorta" – 2:51
10. "Miasmaa" – 4:53
11. "Snow Reader" – 5:41
12. "Frankenstein" * – 4:06
13. "Saffron Tears" * – 5:30
- *Bonus tracks on Japanese edition

== Personnel ==
- Kimmo Pohjonen - accordion, voice
- Pat Mastelotto - rhythmic devices, beats and noises
- Trey Gunn - Warr guitar

== Technical details ==
Engineered by Pat Manske.

Mixed by KTU and Petri Majuri at Seawolf Studios, Helsinki, August – September 2008.

Samuli Kosminen - additional beats and noises, Kosminization.

Steven Wilson - additional mixing of Kataklasm, Jacaranda and Miasmaa at No Man's Land Studios, Hemel Hempstead, UK.

Mastered by Petri Majuri and Kimmo Pohjonen, Seawolf, October 2008.

Executive producer, various orifices and appendages: Philip Page.
