= Society of Manufacturing Engineers =

Professional association

SME
- Predecessor: Society of Manufacturing Engineers, Society of Tool Engineers
- Formation: 1932
- Type: Professional association
- Purpose: To advance manufacturing and attract future generations.
- Headquarters: Southfield, Michigan, United States
- Location: 1000 Town Center, Suite 1910, Southfield, MI 48075
- Region served: Worldwide
- Official language: English
- Secretary General: Vincent W. Howell Sr., FSME, CMfgE
- President: Rebecca Taylor
- Executive Director & CEO: Jeannine Kunz
- Subsidiaries: SME Media, Tooling U-SME, SME Education Foundation
- Website: sme.org
- Formerly called: Society of Manufacturing Engineers

SME, also known as the Society of Manufacturing Engineers, is a non-profit student and professional association for educating and advancing the manufacturing industry in North America.

== History ==
SME was founded in January 1932 at the height of the Great Depression. Originally named the Society of Tool Engineers, and renamed the American Society of Tool Engineers one year later, it was formed by a group of 33 engineers and mechanics gathered at the Detroit College of Applied Science. By April of that year, just four months after its beginning, membership increased from the original 33 members to 200 members and continued to grow rapidly with new chapters popping up across the country. As the economic troubles of the 1930s pushed the world ever-closer to war, Society members responded by helping to convert America's industries into the primary military supplier for the Allied war effort, or what President Roosevelt referred to as the "arsenal of democracy." The organization also tailored their educational materials to meet the needs of the defense program and established the Emergency Defense Training Committee. Between 1941 and the end of the war in 1945, Society membership more than doubled, rising from 8,700 to nearly 18,000 members.

Following the end of the war, the Society helped convert America's wartime industry into a producer of consumer goods. Switching focus from defense to research, appointing a planning committee and setting aside $25,000 for establishing a Research Fund in 1950, the society proceeded to establish a $50,000 educational fund and awarded its first scholarships in 1951. In 1960, the Society changed its name to The American Society of Tool and Manufacturing Engineers and in 1970 it became the Society of Manufacturing Engineers. However, since 2013 only the abbreviation SME has been used as the official name.

The Society launched the SME Manufacturing Engineering Education Foundation in May 1979. By 2007 SME had successfully expanded into more than 72 countries, establishing itself as the world's leading provider of knowledge, networking and skills development for the manufacturing industry. In September 2010, SME acquired Tooling University LLC, an educational technology and blended learning company that provides learning management system software and online manufacturing training content.

In 2018, SME moved its headquarters from Dearborn, Michigan, to Southfield, Michigan.
