= Centrozoon =

German electronic improvisational music group

centrozoon (sometimes incorrectly capitalized as Centrozoon) is a German electronic improvisational music group. The core members are Markus Reuter (Warr touch guitar, loops, programming) and Bernhard Wöstheinrich (synthesizers, electronic percussion, programming). The group's music is flexible and has altered from album to album, but frequently-used elements include ambient music, improvisation, electronica, progressive rock and IDM (intelligent dance music).

While most of the centrozoon recordings have been made by the duo of Reuter and Wöstheinrich, the group has on two occasions expanded to a formal trio - the first featuring No-Man singer Tim Bowness for a set of vocal and song-based projects, the second featuring multi-instrumentalist Tobias Reber. The group has also collaborated with King Crimson drummer Pat Mastelotto, engineer Bill Munyon and a variety of remixers.

== History ==
=== Formation ===
Markus Reuter was a former student of Robert Fripp's Guitar Craft, studying with Fripp and Tony Geballe. Initially trained as a pianist and a student of contemporary classical music (with Karlheinz Straetmanns and Daniel Schell, plus Indian music with Ashok Pathak), he had switched to guitar in the late 1980s and to touch guitar in 1993 (initially Chapman Stick and subsequently Warr Guitar). At around the same time, he had developing an interest in textural loop music. Reuter had also been a member of the Europa String Choir and String Unit.

In the mid-1990s, Reuter met Bernhard Wöstheinrich, an experimental electronic musician playing various synthesizers and electronic rhythm devices. The two began to collaborate as centrozoon in early 1996.

=== Early albums: Blast and Sun Lounge Debris (1999–2001) ===
The first centrozoon album was the predominantly-ambient Blast, which was released on DiN Recordings in 1999. Reviewing the disc, ambient radio station Star's End commented "the duo of centrozoon produce spacemusic difficult to quantify, trace or categorize; their distinguishing characteristic being improvisation… Blast speaks to the listener with a musical vocabulary of contrasting harmonies and remarkable timbres… an album that is at once experimental, cerebral, spacious and engaging. Blast creates its own space, colored by the listener's imagination." A remastered version of the album was released nearly a decade later in 2008, featuring an extra track ("Power").

Blast was followed by Sun Lounge Debris, a collection of pieces of a varying nature, initially issued on British art-rock label Burning Shed in 2001 as a CD-R release. Allmusic noted the album's "ambient-inspired depths, with slowly progressing songs that unfold with layers of haunting, lovely drones that sound like soft sighs" and commented on the "definite hints of prog-tinged exploration throughout... Reuter's a very deliberate player, and his skill at creating loops out of his performances establishes the shade and beautiful texture of the pieces. Wöstheinrich's work is subtle throughout, providing low-key accompaniment and melody to the performances, working in gentle sync with Reuter."

=== The dance phase: The Divine Beast centrophil and The Cult Of: Bibiboo (late 2001–2002) ===
Early hints of what the next centrozoon album would be like (denser and faster, with strong electronic dance-rhythms incorporated) were circulated later in 2001 on a CD EP called The Divine Beast.The first centrozoon release of 2002 was the self-released Centrophil 12-inch vinyl EP, in which the band explored electronic remix culture in collaboration with electronic musician and producer Philipp Quaet-Faslem (who would remain a frequent collaborator). Later in the year, the third centrozoon album The Cult Of: Bibiboo, was released on Burning Shed as a full CD issue. This revealing a much more intense centrozoon incorporating hard dance rhythms and lengthy, uninhibited touch guitar solos.

Chain D.L.K. dubbed it "ambient soundscapes performed with the ease, passion and fragility of real time experimental noise tweakers, and intertwining lines of harmony and freeform fusion performed with the elegance, purity and casualty of a long forgotten jazz art that transpires from underneath the lid of vaporous electronics and artificial density."

Allmusic described the album as "finding some ground between ambient/techno float, space rock zone, and art rock chops, but by not trying to specifically aim at a particular style or approach... The title track is the standout, with Wöstheinrich's beat chaos going near full gabber levels at points throughout the twenty-minute composition, all while soothing keyboards and alternately screaming and calm guitar take the lead." AMG also praised the band for "steer(ing) away from half-hearted fusion to their own particular logic" as well as noting "Reuter's ability to create a brief, thrilling hero rock riff as needed, giving the compositions a nice bit of bite."

The Dutch Progressive Rock Pages described The Cult Of: Bibiboo as "an album full of sonic landscapes which though minimalistic and seemingly simple, is exceptionally rich sounding" while also commenting that "commercial is a word that cannot be whispered when listening to this release and (unfortunately) it is a case of like it or leave it." The review also compared the music to that of Boards Of Canada and Stockhausen.

In 2005, while centrozoon worked in other areas, Synapscape released a remix EP of centrozoon material called Hands On centrozoon.

=== "Pop song" trio work with Tim Bowness (2002–2007) ===
For their next stage of activity, centrozoon began working as a trio with the addition of No-Man singer Tim Bowness, making several appearances with this line-up in the UK in 2002 and shifting their musical focus towards tightly structured songs.

The first recorded evidence of the trio band was an EP called The Scent Of Crash And Burn released on Burning Shed in 2003, fusing Bowness’ voice and alternately romantic/bleak lyrics with Reuter and Wöstheinrich's electropop soundtracks. Twilight Zone webzine compared the results to Depeche Mode, praising the “splendid arrangements” and “chilling prog atmospheres”, while Expose labelled it “a hybrid pop refinement that will appear to fans of Japan as well as King Crimson.”

For various reasons, the follow-up album (Never Trust The Way You Are) was delayed, with the band making up for lost time by releasing the live concert DVD Bigger Space on Burning Shed. Never Trust The Way You Are was finally released on Resonancer Records in 2005. The album featured guest performances from King Crimson drummer Pat Mastelotto on acoustic and electronic drums. Reviewing the album, Classic Rock commented "The stark, spooky arrangements of 'Bigger Space' and 'Ten Versions Of America' fail to disguise cunning hooks, the record's myriad charms unravelling the more it's played." Coming from a more traditional progressive rock perspective, the Dutch Progressive Rock Pages were less impressed, criticising the "lack of variation in tempo" and claiming that "this is not a work that the more traditionally-minded prog fan is going to take to" while labelling the album as "solid" and possibly "appealing to those prog rock fans who enjoy relaxing to a bit of superior 'chill out' music from time to time."

In January 2007, the Dutch audiophile label Tonefloat released the Never Trust The Things They Do album as a vinyl-only issue. This was a companion release to Never Trust The Way You Are featuring the trio/vocal version of centrozoon, and once again featured drumming and rhythms from Pat Mastelotto along with his Mastica bandmate Gum B (on upright bass) and engineer/audio guy Bill Munyon. This brought the collaboration with Tim Bowness to an amicable close, although none of the three musicians have dismissed the possibility of working together again.

=== Second ambient phase: Angel Liquor & Lovefield (2006–2007) ===
By 2006, centrozoon were mostly working in their original duo formation and released the Angel Liquor album on the Divine Frequency label. The Encyclopedia of Electronic Music called it "angular and daring… a curious experimental album with a haunting and sometimes warm atmosphere."

In 2007, centrozoon released the Lovefield album on the Inner Knot label. This was a return to a more minimalistic and textural approach, with the music divided into five ambient "fields". Reviews were mixed. Regen-Mag was measured in its praise, stating that the album "impresses in its constructions if not its musicality" and criticising "the lack of a firm anchor for the casual listener to latch onto" although approving the album for being "impressive in its sound design and construction if not for the musical value... washes of mystical beauty slash and scurry through the mix, like brushstrokes on an audio canvas." The reviewer concluded that "where centrozoon excels is in the construction of these tracks; each track truly lives up to their monikers as literal fields of colorful sonic landscapes… If you are the type who enjoys being taken on a journey with no map, no destination, and no mode of transportation but your own imagination, then centrozoon's latest album might be the trip you've been waiting to take."

The Enochian Apocalypse webzine was more generous, saying of the album that “it’s subtle, it holds and fills out the background to silence when relaxing at home, interesting, and above all involving.”)

=== Archive issues: Vacuum Love, Vols 1–5 (2007) ===
Later in 2007, centrozoon made six hours worth of archive material available as a download release called Vacuum Love, Vols 1–5 (released via MusicZeit). This material dated back to the first days of centrozoon back in October 1998, and featured original rough improvisations recorded live and direct to 2-track DAT.

The band commented "The music is presented as is, uncensored. These sessions (some of which were recorded live in the studio, some live on stage) hint unmistakably at what was to come… There are some technical flaws with some of the recordings, but we've left them untouched in order to not mess with the flow of the improvisations. This music is the seed of centrozoon as we know it."

=== The second trio and Boner (2008–present) ===
In 2008, centrozoon once again expanded to a trio: this time, the third member was multi-instrumentalist and sound designer Tobias Reber. Over the next four years the group played and recorded various concerts while collating material and approaches for the next record.

In 2012, centrozoon announced the forthcoming release of a new album, Boner, which they described as a return to highly experimental work involving dense overdubbing drawn from dozens of hours of recording. This album is to be released in a limited edition of 300 physical CDs, which in turn is to be divided into two separate but related releases: a version of Boner mixed and sequenced by Adrian Benavides and a version mixed and sequenced by Marziano Fontana (both version mastered by longstanding centrozoon collaborator Lee Fletcher). The band financed the recording of the album via a marketing campaign called "Bonestarter", in which they sold a variety of Boner-related packages (including physical and digital versions of the album, signatures, Skype-based interviews, T-shirts, cover art, music tutoring sessions, musical applications and even the album's multi-track source recordings). Boner was released on May 9, 2012.

Post-Boner, the band have concentrated on live work, which they've documented on 2014's The Room of Plenty and the ongoing 217 series drawn from their twentieth anniversary live tour.

== Musical connections and other activities ==
Markus Reuter has a solo career in parallel to centrozoon and is a member of several other collaborative projects, including but not limited to:

- Tuner, an American/German duo collaboration with King Crimson drummer Pat Mastellotto
- [halo], an Anglo-German trio collaboration with Lee Fletcher (music / production) and Lisa Fletcher (vocals)
- Tovah, a project centred on singer-songwriter Tovah, featuring contributions from Mastelotto, Wostheinrich and others.

Bernhard Wöstheinrich has released solo material under the project name of The Redundant Rocker.

Reuter and/or Wöstheinrich have also collaborated (together and separately) with Ian Boddy, Robert Rich, and Nigel Mullaney, and both contributed to Tim Bowness’ 2004 solo album My Hotel Year.

== Members ==
=== Current members ===
- Markus Reuter - touch guitars (including Warr Guitar and own-brand version), loops, programming, electronics, electric guitar, bass guitar, Z-tar MIDI controller (1996–present)
- Bernhard Wöstheinrich - synthesizers, electronic percussion, programming, occasional vocals (1996–present)
- Tobias Reber - electronics, field recordings, programming, touch guitar, synthesizers (2008–present)

=== Previous members ===
- Tim Bowness - vocals & voice-loops (2003–2007)

== Discography ==
=== Albums ===
- Blast (DiN Recordings, 1999 - reissued on Unsung Records/Inner Knot in 2008, reissued again on vinyl in 2017 with two bonus tracks)
- Sun Lounge Debris (Burning Shed, 2001 - CD-R)
- The Cult of: Bibbiboo (Burning Shed, 2002)
- Never Trust the Way You Are (Resonancer Records, 2005)
- Angel Liquor (Divine Frequency, 2006)
- Never Trust the Things They Do (Tonefloat, 2006 - vinyl-only)
- Lovefield (Unsung Records/Inner Knot, 2007)
- Boner (Unsung Records/iapetus, 2012)

=== EPs ===
- The Divine Beast (centrozoon, 2001)
- Centrophil (centrozoon, 2002)
- Circulaar (centrozoon, 2002/2003)
- The Scent Of Crash And Burn (Burning Shed, 2003)

=== Download-only releases ===
- Ten Versions of America (2003)
- Vacuum Love, Vols 1–5 (2007, Iapetus)
- Fire (live) (2007, Iapetus)
- The Room of Plenty (live) (2014, Iapetus)
- 217 (ongoing multi-volume live series) (2017, Iapetus)
- Le Surreal Parkhouse (Live in Bern 2017) (2018)
- KLAMAUK 1 (live recording from Mannheim, 2018) (2019)
- KLAMAUK 2 (live recording from Mannheim, 2018) (2019)
- KLAMAUK 3 (live recording from Mannheim, 2018) (2019)
- eisprung (compilation) (iapetus, 2020)
- Harmonic Hospitality (live) (2020)

=== Remixed ===
- Synapscape Hands On centrozoon EP (2005)
- Redundancy Mega Mix (iapetus, 2020)
