= Stick Men (progressive rock band) =

American supergroup

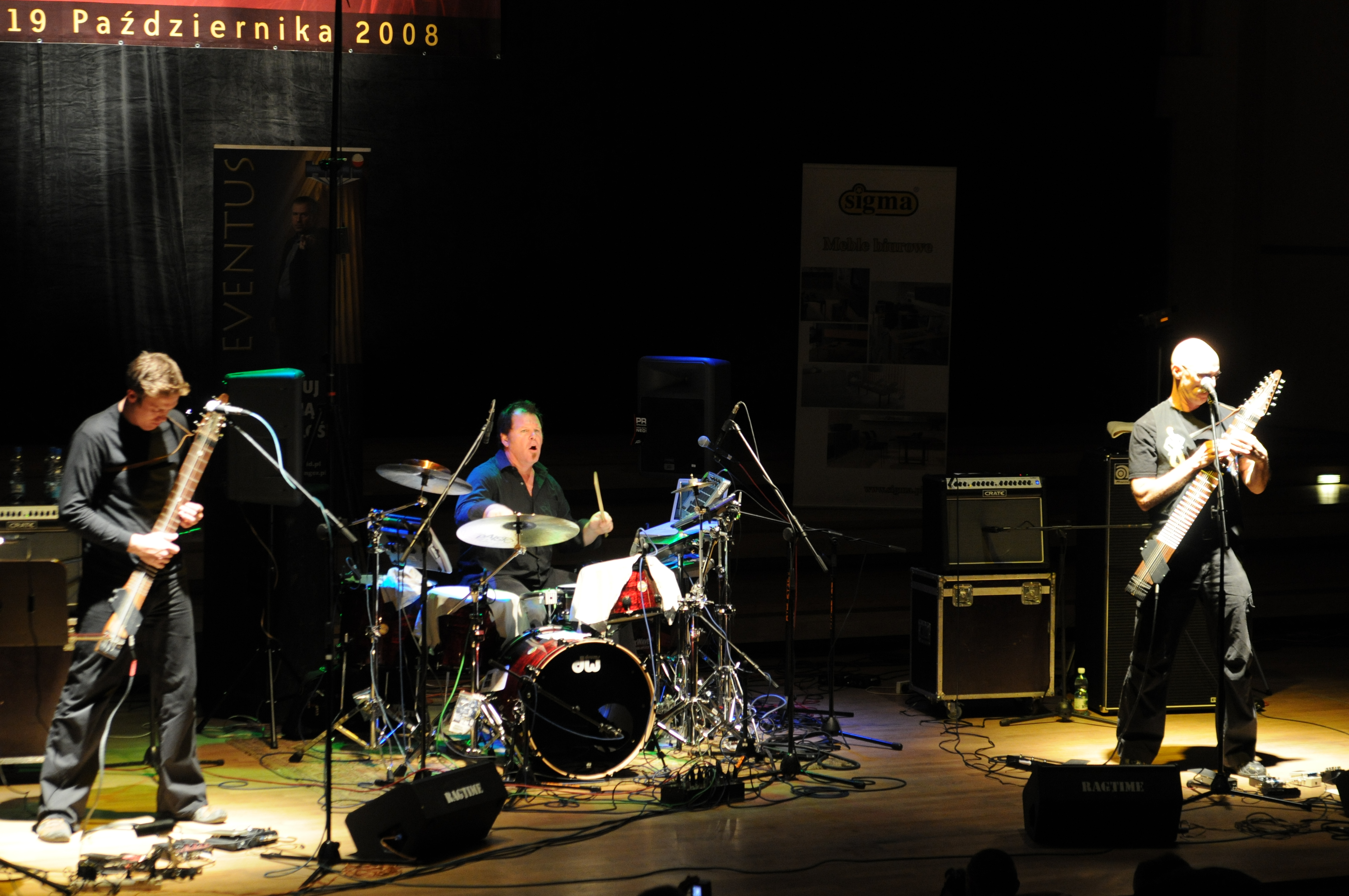
- Stick Men in 2008: Michael Bernier, Pat Mastelotto, Tony Levin

Background information
- Origin: Boston, Massachusetts, U.S.
- Genres: Progressive rock
- Years active: 2007–present
- Label: Moonjune
- Members: Tony Levin; Pat Mastelotto; Markus Reuter
- Past members: Michael Bernier

Stick Men is an American progressive rock supergroup founded in 2007 by Pat Mastelotto, Tony Levin, and Michael Bernier. Since 2010, the lineup stabilized around Mastelotto, Levin, and Markus Reuter. The band was formed as a vehicle for progressive rock music performed almost exclusively with Chapman Sticks and drums.

== History ==
In 2007, Levin released a solo album entitled Stick Man, consisting of pieces recorded on the Chapman Stick, featuring his King Crimson bandmate Pat Mastelotto on drums. This then led to the formation of the band Stick Men by Mastelotto, Levin and Chapman Stick player Michael Bernier. The band released its first album Soup in 2010. Bernier left shortly after the release of Soup, to be replaced by Markus Reuter in early August 2010.

The new lineup released the CD Absalom, in 2011, and an album of improvisations, Open, in June 2012. A studio album titled Deep was released in February 2013. There is a special edition including a DVD. The album features heavy rock pieces that are mostly instrumental with exceptions like Horatio featuring Pat Mastelotto on vocals. The album also includes 11 minute tone poem Whale Watch based on Tony Levin's experiences taking whale watching trips out of Boston.

In January 2014, the band released their first live album called Power Play.

In October 2014, Stick Men released their first retrospective album. A double album, the first disc featured studio recordings, while the second was a compilation of various recorded live improvisations the band performed on tour. Also included on the album are remixes and remakes of various other Stick Men songs.

Two collaborative live albums with King Crimson members were subsequently recorded in Tokyo, Japan. The first one, Midori, featuring David Cross on violin and keyboards, was recorded in 2015. The second one, Roppongi, with Mel Collins on sax, was recorded in 2017. Eventually, a 2018 tour of Latin American countries featuring David Cross on violin became the multi-disc boxed set Panamerica, released in 2019. In the same spirit of collaborations with prog legends, their sole 2020 concert in Japan with keyboardist Gary Husband became their album Owari, recorded in Osaka on February the 28th.

Their fourth studio album with Markus Reuter, Prog Noir, was recorded and released in 2016. This album featured several vocal pieces. Tony Levin sang the title track, Markus Reuter sang Plutonium, and they shared vocals on the promotional single, The Tempest.

After a six-year hiatus in recording, an EP, Tentacles, was released in April 2022. This was followed by the live album Umeda (2023) culled from their Tentacles tour, plus EPs Swimming in Tea (2024) and Brutal (2025).

== Style ==
Stylistically, Stick Men's sound is quite unique. Touting the fact that their lead musicians are "playing instruments unlike any other," their music has evolved to be somewhere between Art Rock, Progressive Rock, and in some cases Progressive Metal. There is a heavy influence of free music and improvisation during their live shows, as the musicians will often showcase their prowess on their respective instruments in extended free music jams. Most notably, the band honors their connection and tenure with King Crimson by performing songs by the band as well as songs by Robert Fripp, King Crimson's lead member and guitarist. Stick Men has also arranged an abridged version of Stravinsky's "Firebird Suite", a staple of their live shows.

Most of their compositions are instrumental, with very few songs featuring vocals, mostly by Levin, but occasionally by Reuter and Mastelotto as well. During his time with the band following the release of "Soup", Bernier provided vocals on some songs.

== Band members ==
=== Current ===
- Tony Levin – Chapman Stick, vocals (2007–present)
- Pat Mastelotto – drums, percussion (2007–present)
- Markus Reuter – touch guitar, vocals (2010–present)

=== Former ===
- Michael Bernier – Chapman Stick, vocals (2007–2010)

== Discography ==
=== Studio albums ===
Year	Title	Notes
2009	Stick Men	A special edition release with preview material from the band's next CD
2010	Soup	
2011	Absalom	EP
2012	Open	
2013	Deep	
2016	Prog Noir	
2017	Prog Noir (Bonus Tracks)	Digital Release
2021	Prog Noir (Unquiet Remix with TLEV Collage)	Remix
2022	Tentacles	EP
2025	Brutal	EP

=== Live albums ===
Year	Title	Notes
2011	Live in Montevideo 2011	Digital Release, Recorded Live at La Trastieda Club, Montevideo, March 16, 2011
2011	Live in Buenos Aires 2011	Digital Release, Recorded Live at Teatro ND Ateneo, Buenos Aires, March 13, 2011
2014	Power Play	Recorded on the Deep Tour USA 2013
2015	Unleashed: Live Improvs 2013	Standalone release; also released as disc two of the Supercollider anthology
2015	Midori: Live in Tokyo (Featuring David Cross)	Recorded Live at Billboard Live, Tokyo, April 10, 2015, Release by Moonjune Records
2017	Roppongi: Live in Tokyo 2017 (Featuring Mel Collins)	Recorded Live at Billboard Live, Tokyo, February 21, 2017, Release by Moonjune Records
2019	Panamerica (Live in Latin America) (Featuring David Cross)	5-disc Set, Recorded Live at multiple venues in Bolivia, Argentina, Brazil, Peru, Uruguay, Chile, Costa Rica, Mexico, and Guatemala, Release by Moonjune Records
2020	Owari (Featuring Gary Husband)	Recorded Live at Blue Note Nagoya, February 28, 2020, Release by Moonjune Records
2023	UMEDA (Live in Osaka 2022)	Recorded Live at the BB, Osaka, Japan, July 14, 2022, Release by Moonjune Records
2024	Swimming in Tea	EP, recorded at Teatro Caio Melisso, Spoleto, Italy, November 10, 2023

=== Compilations ===
Year	Title	Notes
2014	Supercollider: An Anthology 2010–2014	Disc 1: Collider (Best of 2010–2014) & Disc 2: Unleashed (Live improvs from the DEEP Tour USA 2013)
2017	KONNEKTED	Digital Release
2017	KOLLEKTED	A promotional-only CD given away for free during King Crimson shows in 2017
