= Tooling U-SME =

- Predecessor: Tooling University
- Formation: 1942
- Type: not-for-profit educational organization
- Headquarters: Cleveland, Ohio, United States
- Location: 3615 Superior Avenue East Building 44, 6th Floor Cleveland, OH 44114
- Region served: Worldwide
- Official language: English
- Website: toolingu.com

Tooling U-SME, formerly Tooling University, is an American non-profit educational technology and blended learning organization that produces learning management system software, certifications and content for the manufacturing industry. Owned by the Society of Manufacturing Engineers (SME) and headquartered in Cleveland, Ohio, Tooling U provides online industrial manufacturing training, development, and competency based apprenticeship programs.

== History ==
Tooling University, the original online training component of Tooling U-SME, was founded to address the shortage of skilled workers in the manufacturing industry. Tooling U began as a division of Jergens Inc., a workholding and tooling component manufacturer founded in 1942. In 2010, Tooling University was acquired by SME.

Since the acquisition, Tooling U-SME has spent recent years uniting all of its training products, launching service offering upgrades, and providing niche learning services for specific jobs like welding. The company has also been awarded multiple grants from US government institutions like the Department of Defense and the Department of Labor to develop training programs that support the development of America's workforce in manufacturing.

== Competency Framework ==
In early 2014 Tooling U-SME launched the Competency Framework for achieving manufacturing excellence. The Competency Framework is made up of more than 60 job competency models in nine manufacturing functional areas. Each competency model outlines knowledge and skill objectives for production workers, technicians, lead technicians and technologists, and engineers.

== Products and Services ==
Tooling U-SME supplies manufacturers, high schools and technical colleges with in-house and online training resources that are translatable to both certificate programs and associate degrees. Students can choose from over 70 instructor-led programs, and have 24/7 access to more than 450 online courses, covering everything from safety and maintenance to composites and machining.

=== Custom Training Content ===
Custom in-house training and educational content for schools and organizations.

=== Assessments ===
Online assessments for evaluating current workforce skills and developing training programs based on filling the gaps.

=== Certifications ===
Industry-backed certifications for lean manufacturing technology, machining technology, advanced manufacturing, and manufacturing engineering, as well as certificate programs for green manufacturing. Tooling U-SME training courses adhere to the National Institute for Metalworking Skills (NIMS) Standards, SME Certified Manufacturing Technologist (CMfgT) certification, Manufacturing Skills Standards Council (MSSC) standards and American Welding Society (AWS) SENSE Level 1 standard.

=== Online bookstore and Knowledge Edge® ===
Knowledge Edge is a subscription service digital library with more than 700 industrial training videos and clips, 1,200 eBooks and eChapters, 16,000 technical papers and 10,000 entries in the Manufacturing Knowledge Base wiki.

== See also ==
- E-learning
- Online Learning
- Workforce development
- Manufacturing engineering
- Competency model
