= Tu (American band) =

American rock duo

- Origin: Seattle, United States
- Genres: Progressive rock
- Years active: 2002–present
- Spinoff of: King Crimson
- Members: Trey Gunn; Pat Mastelotto

TU is an American musical duo made up of King Crimson members Trey Gunn and Pat Mastelotto, formed in 2002. They have released an official bootleg album, one studio album, one EP, and one live record. The duo's music is largely based on improvisation, sampling, and jazz elements. Gunn and Mastelotto are also members of the supergroup KTU.

== Discography ==
- Thunderbird Suite Under the name Rhythm Buddies (EP, 2002)
- Tu (2003)
- Official Bootleg (2004)
- Tu (Live in Russia) (2011)
