= Namgar =

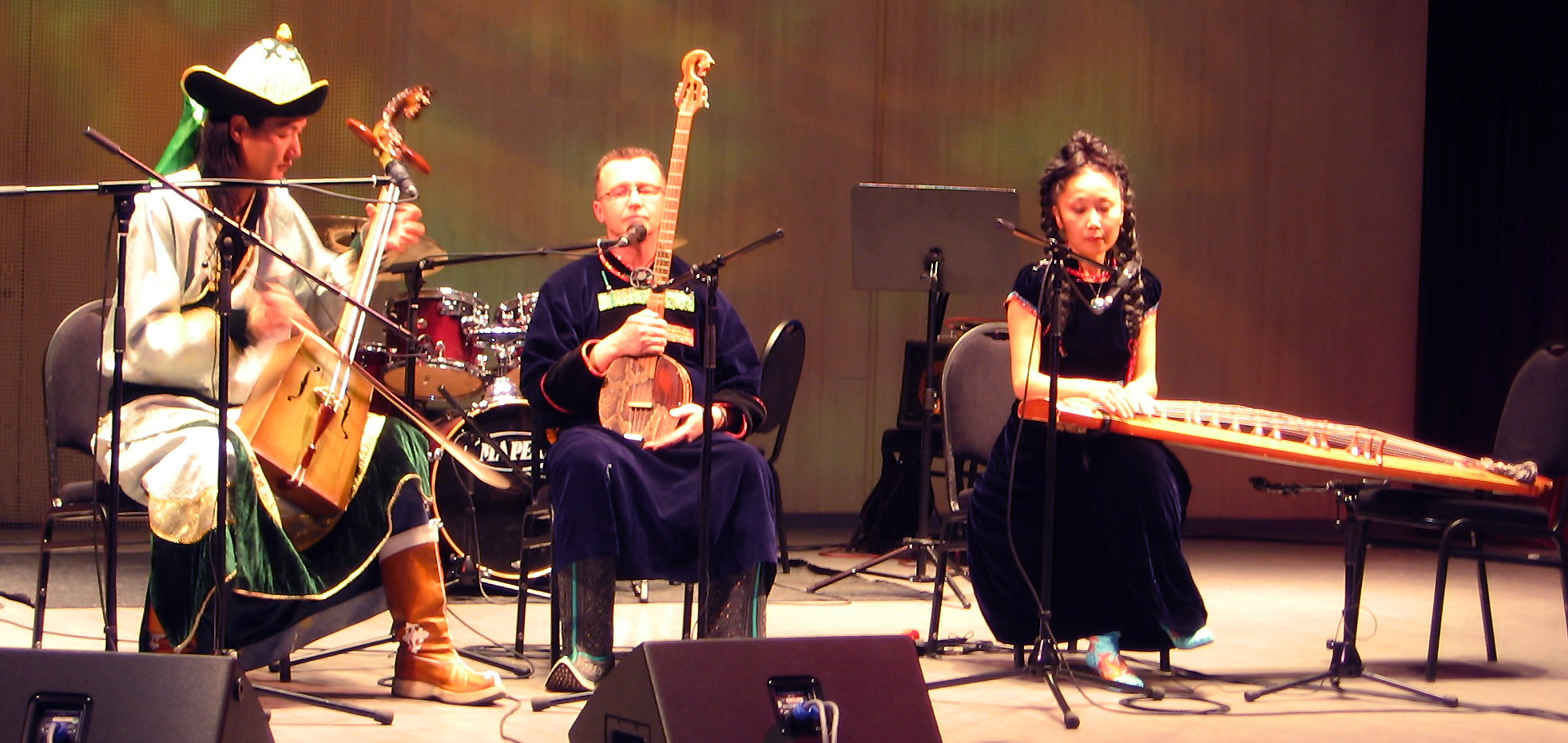
- en trio (right to left: Namgar, Evgeny Zolotarev, Erdenebal Javkhlan) on Nov 13, 2008.

Background information
- Origin: Aga and Buryatia (Russia), Mongolia
- Genres: Traditional, world, folk, rock
- Years active: 2001–present
- Website: www.namgar.ru

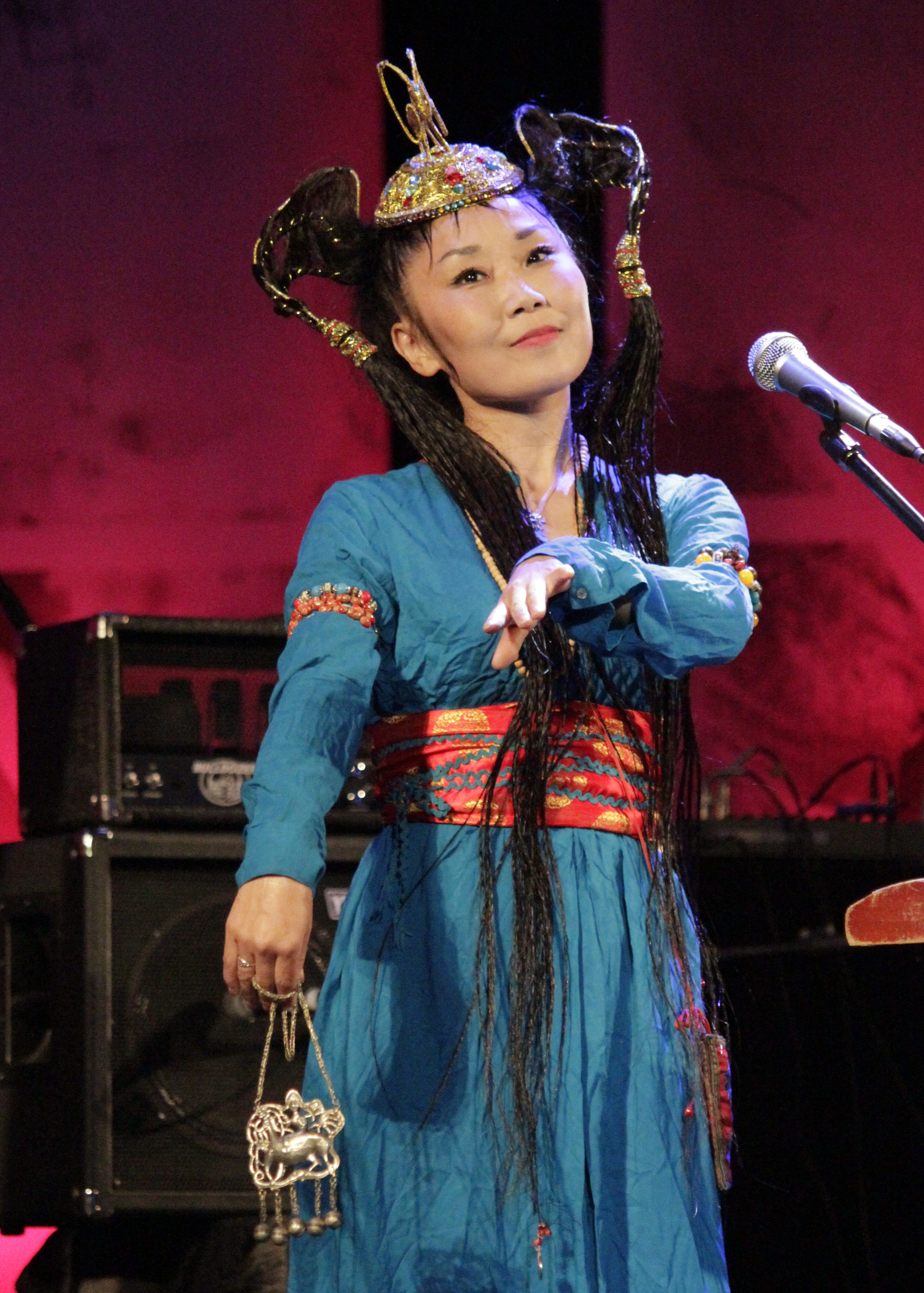
Namgar Lkhasaranova on stage in 2012

Namgar (Buryat: Намгар) is a 4-piece music group that performs traditional Buryat and Mongolian music. It was formed in 2001.

Its leader Namgar Lhasaranova comes from the east borderland where three countries, Russia, Mongolia, and China meet. She inherited a rich singing tradition of the Buryat people who reside in Russian regions of Buryatia and Agin Buryat Region. The group necessarily comprises singing of Namgar Lhasaranova and instrumentalists from Mongolia. Instruments of the group include morin khuur, chanza, traditional percussion, etc.

== Background ==
Namgar Lhasaranova performed solo or with modern groups at local and international venues since 1980 in a variety of genres including traditional songs, jazz and pop. It was in 2001 in Moscow that she and Evgeny Zolotarev (also spelled Zolotaryov) created a permanent group inviting Mongolian musicians Kh. Altangerel on morin khuur and Jamyangiin Urantögs on yatga.

Their notable distinction from Mongolian groups are dance tunes extinct in Mongolia since 17th century, and the endorsement of Buryat tradition with minimum inclusion of songs from 20th century.

== History ==
Launching Moscow concerts in March 2001, the group performed at the international festival Riddu Riđđu (Norway) in July 2001 along with Hedningarna, Wimme, Sainkho Namtchylak, Mari Boine, Chirgilchin etc. The collaboration with the festival continues until today (2008), while the group became the official representative of the festival in Russia.

There were several appearances of the group at Russia's major TV channels and concert venues. For some years they would also open exhibitions of a leading Buryat sculptor Dashi Namdakov in Moscow.

Namgar's debut CD titled Hatar (Dance), was recorded and issued in October 2003 by Moscow World Music label Sketis Music.

In 2008 Namgar performed at Alianait Art Festival in Canada.

They opened 2009 with their first visit to the US for NYC's GlobalFest. On January 9, they were on air on WFMU radio in Transpacific Sound Paradise, played at globalFEST at Webster Hall in 2010.

In 2013 Namgar released an album called The Dawn of the Foremothers.

They played at the Riddu Riddu festival in Norway several times from 2001 to 2024.

In 2013 the band name was changed to Nordic Namgar.
