= Tu (surname) =

Tu (Chinese: 屠; pinyin: Tú) is a Chinese surname, and the 279th family name in Hundred Family Surnames (百家姓). Other Chinese surnames romanized Tú include 涂, 凃, and 塗.

Từ is also the Vietnamese form of the surname 徐, romanized from Mandarin Chinese as Xú and from Cantonese as Tsui.

== Origin ==
From one of the characters in the name of the ancient city of Zoutu. The legendary emperor Yellow Emperor (2697–2595 BC) used this city as a military base.

== People with the surname Tu ==
=== People with the surname Tu (屠) ===
- Tu Qihua (屠玘華; 1914–2004), birth-name of the 20th century author Mei Zhi
- Tu Youyou (屠呦呦; born 1930), Chinese medical scientist, winner of the 2011 Lasker Award and the 2015 Nobel Prize in Physiology or Medicine
- Tu Jida (屠基达; 1927–2011), aircraft designer, "father of the Chengdu J-7" fighter

=== People with the surname Tu (涂) ===
- Thor Chuan Leong (涂振龙; born 1988), Malaysian professional snooker player
- Tu Mingjing (涂铭旌; 1928–2019), Chinese materials scientist
- Twu Shiing-jer (涂醒哲), Taiwanese epidemiologist and mayor of Chiayi City (2014–2018)
- Li Tu (涂辰立; born 1996), Australian tennis player

== See also ==
- Tú
