= Tú (Canadian band) =

Canadian pop music duo

Tú was a Canadian pop music duo from the Toronto area in the 1980s, featuring twin sisters Amanda and Cassandra DiBlasi..

== History ==
The DiBlasi twins appeared on The Tommy Hunter Show in 1985. They released a self-titled album in 1987 on RCA Records. Their second album, Secrets in the Dark, was released in 1989 by Columbia Records.

Their biggest hit, the single "Stay with Me", was their only Top 20 song, reaching number 18 on the Canadian music charts on November 28th of 1987. They also released the singles "I Used to Cry", "Language of Love", "Stop Breaking My Heart", and "Le Freak - Tú Freak", a cover version of the 1978 Chic song "Le Freak".

Tú also appeared as backup singers in Platinum Blonde's video for "Fire".
