= Europa String Choir =

Cross-disciplinary musical ensemble

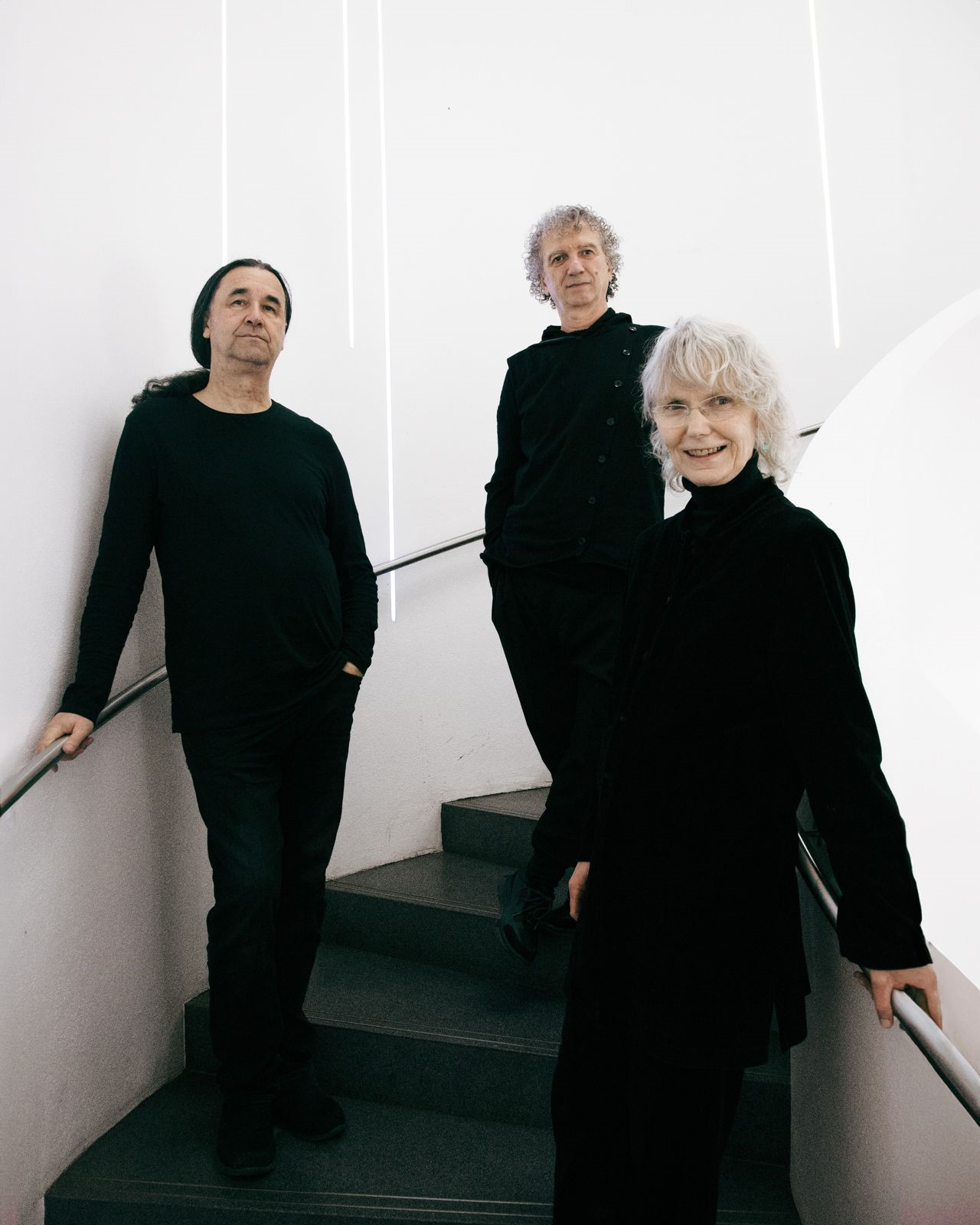
Europa String Choir: Udo Dzierzanowski, Alessandro Bruno, Cathy Stevens

Europa String Choir are a European musical ensemble known for making “Electric Chamber Music”. The ensemble was formed in the summer of 1993 in Rome, Italy by British violinist Cathy Stevens (who plays a 6-String-Violectra), German guitarist Udo Dzierzanowski, and Italian guitarist Alessandro Bruno. Europa String Choir's mostly self-written, all instrumental music ranges from intricate and touching to strident and rocking, while always aware that silence is at its core.

Other Europa String Choir members and collaborators during the ensemble's lifetime have included Markus Reuter (Warr Guitar, touch guitar), Susan Nares (Celtic harp, cello) and Brigitte Sassano (harp).

== History ==
=== Cathy Stevens ===
The daughter of composer Bernard Stevens, Cathy Stevens studied violin and viola at the Yehudi Menuhin School and the Royal Academy of Music. In 1975, she became a professional orchestral player, working with the London Sinfonietta and Fires of London among others. Between 1983 and 1992, Stevens worked as one half of the improvised music duo Pool of Sound (with cellist Chas Dickie, a former member of Van der Graaf Generator).

=== Cathy Stevens & Udo Dzierzanowski ===
By 1982, Stevens had also graduated as a practitioner of the Alexander Technique, and it was in this capacity that she began working with Robert Fripp's Guitar Craft courses in 1989. On one of these courses she met guitarist Udo Dzierzanowski. In 1991, Stevens and Dzierzanowski formed a viola-and-guitar duo called The Annexe performing both self-penned and classical music, which toured with fellow Guitar Craft graduates California Guitar Trio.

=== Alessandro Bruno joined and Europa String Choir was born in 1993 ===
On a subsequent residential music course in 1993, second guitarist Alessandro Bruno joined the project, which took on the new name of Europa String Choir. The ensemble's first album, The Starving Moon, was recorded for Fripp's Discipline Global Mobile label later in the same year.

=== From Trio to Quartet with Markus Reuter ===
In 1996, Europa String Choir recruited a fourth member - Chapman Stick/Warr Guitar player Markus Reuter, another Guitar Craft student. Over the next four years, the quartet would intermittently tour Europe and the USA. Europa String Choir's second album Lemon Crash was released by DGM spinoff label DGMLive. This more composed and pre-structured work, which reflects the ensemble's classical leanings, was produced by David Bottrill. Marching Ants, a second album of improvisations from the Lemon Crash sessions and tour, was eventually released in 2003 on the Burning Shed label.

During the next decade, Europa String Choir continued to record and perform intermittently, predominantly as a duo of Stevens and Dzierzanowski. Celtic harp player/cellist Susan Nares (from the Poole-based Soundways project) was recruited for the ensemble's trio lineup in 2003.

In 2013, Stevens and Dzierzanowski relocated the Europa String Choir from south-west England to a location near the Alps on the German/Austrian border. In 2014, the ensemble released their first album in eleven years (the ambient/improvised recording Eye of the Beholder).

Having worked as a duo, trio and quartet (with Markus Reuter) in the intervening years, Europa String Choir celebrated their 30th anniversary in 2023 by touring UK, Germany and Italy, and presented their 7th album release “Sassoska” in 2024.

== Other musical activities ==
=== Guitar Craft / Guitar Circle classes ===
The band members are active within the worldwide network of Guitar Craft / Guitar Circle, founded by Robert Fripp. They organize, lead, and participate in workshops in Germany, Italy, and Spain. In 2025, they took part in a concert with The Orchestra of Crafty Guitarists, featuring more than 100 guitarists from around the world, as well as performances with The League of Silence and Electric Radius.

The English guitarist Robert Fripp, known for his work with King Crimson and David Bowie’s “Heroes”, also contributed to one of the band’s releases and was partly responsible for the band’s name.

The musicians from Europa String Choir use the new standard tuning (C-G-D-A-E-G), which is also called the Guitar Circle Tuning.

=== "Listen.Connect.Create." music workshop ===
The Europa String Choir has founded a music worhsop called "LISTEN. CONNECT. CREATE. - THE BASICS OF MUSICAL COLLABORATION & IMPROVISATION," which is currently held at regular intervals in Italy and Germany. Some of the elements taught in the workshop are silence, circulation, improvisation, polyrhythm & body beat, the Alexander Technique, and Qigong.

=== Film scoring ===
The ensemble members have contributed to the music scores of several film projects, either in an individual capacity or as Europa String Choir.

Film	Song	Composer	Performer
Maquilas (2004), Isabella Sandri & Guiseppe M. Gaudino	"Maquilas"	Alessandro Bruno	Epsilon Indi
Meilicke (2022), Andreas Wieland	"Ten Years" (from the album RealPromoDemo)	Markus Reuter	Europa String Choir
Written over pictures (2024), Andreas Wieland	"Waterfall" (from the album Lemoncrash), "Ten Years" (from the album RealPromoDemo) and "Woodentops"	Europa String Choir and Udo Dzierzanowski for "Woodentops"	Europa String Choir

==== Documentary "Maquilas", Italy 2004 ====
Directed by Isabella Sandri & Giuseppe M. Gaudino. Song “Maquilas” written by Alessandro Bruno, performed by Epsilon Indi

==== Short film "Meilicke" Germany 2021/22 ====
From ”Toloselowtrack Film Berlin”, Andreas Wieland (English and German)

Song „Ten Years“ from the album “RealPromoDemo” written by Markus Reuter, performed by Europa String Choir

==== "Written over pictures - Chronik eines nie gemachten Films (Porto)" (2001-2024) ====
film, art and research project from “Toloselowtrack Film Berlin”, Andreas Wieland (English and German)

Songs: “Waterfall” (album “Lemon Crash”), „Ten Years“ from the album “RealPromoDemo”, “Woodentops” by Udo Dzierzanowski

Outlook: 2026 a live film-premier performance at “Kulturhafen”, Gross Neuendorf an der Oder, Germany is planned. Markus Reuter will re-join Cathy Stevens, Udo Dzierzanowski and Alessandro Bruno on stage after 20 years.

Both Stevens and Dzierzanowski are also members of contemporary improvised music ensemble ZAUM (now 2AUM), founded by the late improv/power drummer Steve Harris in 2001 and collaborate with visual artist Frances Hatch (as Frozen Orchestras of Lost Sound).

==== New Film at work „Vom Suchen und Finden“ ====
From Searching and Finding (Vom Suchen und Finden) is a documentary film produced by the Stephanus Foundation in collaboration with filmmaker Andreas Wieland. The film features residents of the Im Sonnenwinkel residential community in Haßleben, Germany, who share their experiences of life in children’s homes in the German Democratic Republic (GDR). It is part of “Remember and Acknowledge” (Erinnern und Anerkennen), an initiative by the Stephanus Foundation that documents, recognizes, and reflects on the experiences of people with cognitive disabilities. It is scheduled to premiere in January 2026.

The film’s score is composed by the Europa String Choir. The piece “Processional” was featured in the trailer.

==== Further Project "Frozen Orchestras of Lost Sounds ====
Both Stevens and Dzierzanowski are also members of contemporary improvised music ensemble ZAUM (now 2AUM), founded by the late improv/power drummer Steve Harris in 2001 and collaborate with visual artist Frances Hatch (as Frozen Orchestras of Lost Sound).

== Collaborations ==
- Frozen Orchestras of Lost Sound
- Steve Harris ZAUM
- Electric Radius
- Cathy, Udo and Alessandro share years of experience with the League Of Crafty Guitarists and the Orchestra Of Crafty Guitarists, currently working as both instructors and students within this tradition.
- Robert Fripp (The Starving Moon
- Silence in Music Ensemble
- Ascending Voices, Ensemble Chrismós and Kristallempfänger in Collaboration with Alexander Hermann
- Collaborations with Robert Fripp (e.g. "The Starving Moon", "Camilla`s Little Secret")
- Projects with David Singleton (e.g. "Camilla`s Little Secret", "the Vicar Songbook #1)
- Recordings with Fernando Kabusacki and also Uma Kabusacki

== Personnel ==
=== Current members ===
- Cathy Stevens (violin, viola, Violectra)
- Udo Dzierzanowski (guitar, bouzouki)
- Alessandro Bruno (guitar)

=== Previous/additional members ===
- Markus Reuter (Warr Guitar, touch guitar)

== Discography ==
- The Starving Moon (DGM, 1995)
- The Starving Moon (self released, 1994)
- RealPromoDemo (self released, 1998)
- Lemon Crash (DGMLive, 2000)
- Marching Ants (Burning Shed, 2004)
- The Eye of the Beholder (self-released, 2014)
- Sasosska (self-released, 2023)
- Anniversary album Lemon Crash (release date Dec 5th, 2025)
