= Guitar Craft =

Series of guitar and personal development classes

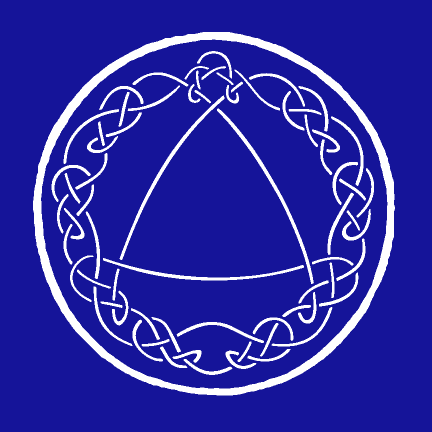
The knotwork symbol of Guitar Craft (Courtesy of Steve Ball)

Guitar Craft (GC) was a series of guitar and personal-development classes, founded and often presented by Robert Fripp, who is best known for his work with the rock band King Crimson. Guitar Craft courses introduced students to new standard tuning and ergonomic playing with the plectrum (pick), often using steel-stringed, acoustic, shallow-body guitars from the Ovation Guitar Company.

By 2011, three thousand students had completed the courses. Students who continue to practise Guitar Craft playing have been called "crafties". Notable crafties include Trey Gunn and the California Guitar Trio (all four of whom, with Fripp, constituted The Robert Fripp String Quintet) and Markus Reuter. Crafties have recorded several albums under the name of "Robert Fripp and the League of Crafty Guitarists", for example.

After 25 years, the Guitar Craft movement transformed its activities into Guitar Circles, which offer introductory courses and performances in Europe and the Americas. Guitar Circles meet in many cities; in particular, The Seattle Guitar Circle meets for practices and performances and also sponsors a school.

== Courses ==
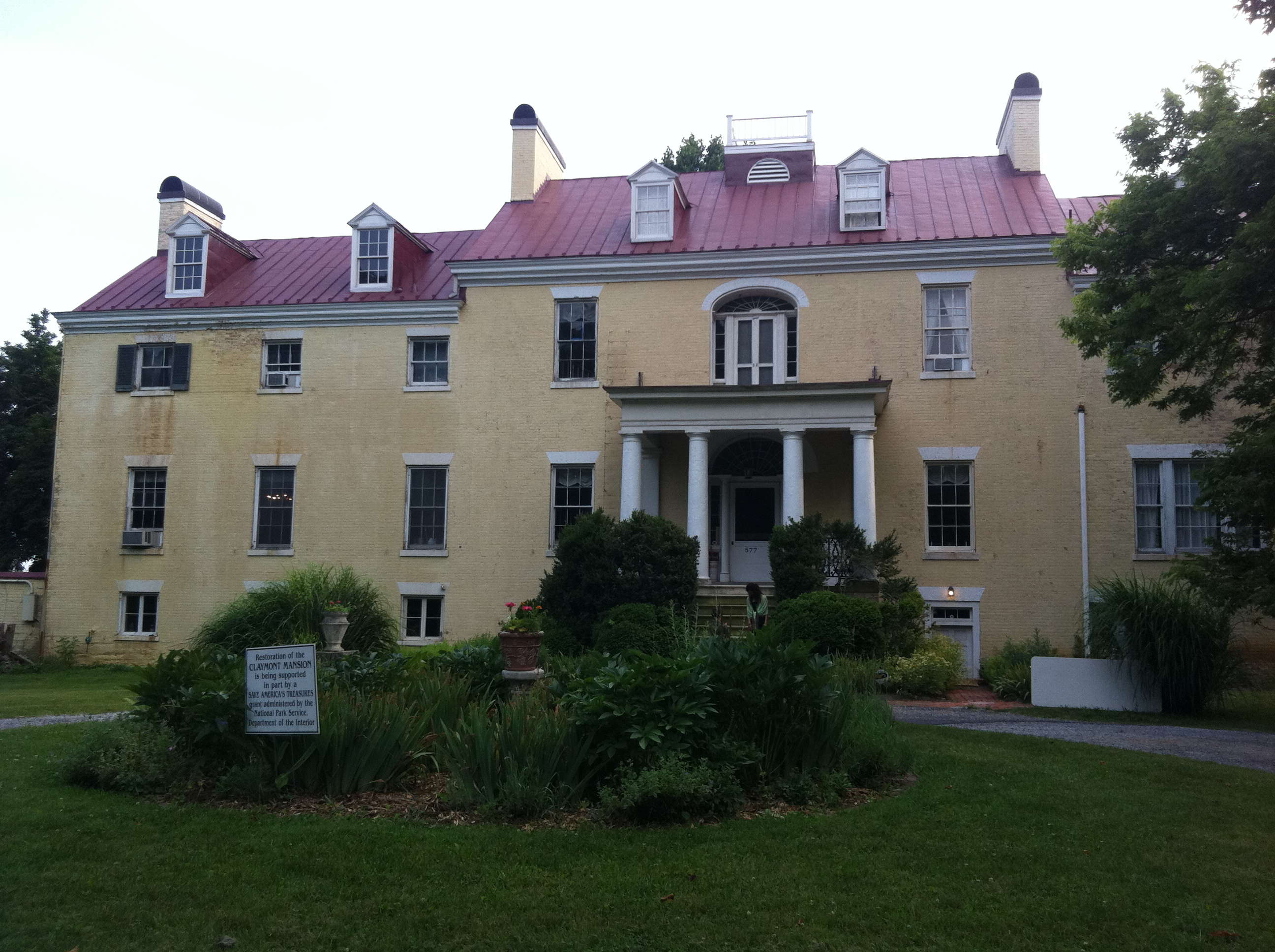
The first Guitar Craft course began on 25 March 1985 at the Claymont Court site in Charles Town, West Virginia.

Fripp's Guitar Craft courses were first offered by the American Society for Continuous Education, near the Claymont Court site in Charles Town, West Virginia. Guitar Craft stated that it offers ways to develop relationships with the guitar, music, and oneself.

=== New standard tuning ===
The open-string notes of new standard tuning. Play

GC popularized New Standard Tuning (NST), Fripp's guitar tuning using the notes (C2 G2 D3 A3 E4 G4 low to high). Learning NST enabled guitarists to experience playing the guitar as a beginner, albeit usually a sophisticated beginner. At Guitar Craft seminars and courses, students work exclusively in NST. For new GC students, NST is unfamiliar, and so all students have the same experience of renewing their guitar playing while having difficulty adjusting previous habits.

Guitar Craft courses welcomed students with no previous experience of guitar playing, although most students had been playing for at least two years, so that they had sufficient musculature. Fripp has stated that previous experiences sometimes burdened players with bad habits and inappropriate expectations.

=== Picking and fretting hands ===
For the level-one GC course, the curriculum offers seven primary exercises. The first primary exercise for the left hand is followed by the second primary exercise for the right hand, which teaches alternate picking.

==== Alternate and cross picking ====
The guitar pick (plectrum) is held between the thumb and the index finger. The thumb is not bent forward at the first digit from the tip. Rather the thumb is brought to the index finger by its lowest joint, which maintains the convexity of the thumb's ball at the base of the hand; a collapsed thumb-ball signals improper technique. The four fingers point towards the elbow. The other three fingers curl inwards in a relaxed position, supporting the index finger, each successively supporting its predecessor. Holding the pick in this manner relaxes the hand, arm, and shoulder, allowing playing without tension. For a single note, the string is struck by only the tip of the triangular GC pick, with the force orthogonal to the string and the pick tangent to the string. The pick-string contact takes place above the sound-hole.

In the fundamental technique, the picking hand is suspended above the strings and moves over the strings without pivoting on the ball of the hand or touching the strings or bridge. Holding the pick in this manner promotes relaxation from the fingers to the back, and it also facilitates the alternate picking of single strings and the cross picking among several strings. Fripp, who is known for his cross-picking, teaches the technique in Guitar Craft. Fripp's cross-picking has influenced many other guitarists, particularly in progressive rock. The fourth primary exercise introduces cross picking.

==== Fretting hand ====
For the fretting hand, the technique is close to the left-hand technique of Spanish classical guitar. The thumb is placed in the middle of the back of the neck, not over the back of the neck (to finger bass strings).

=== Guitars ===
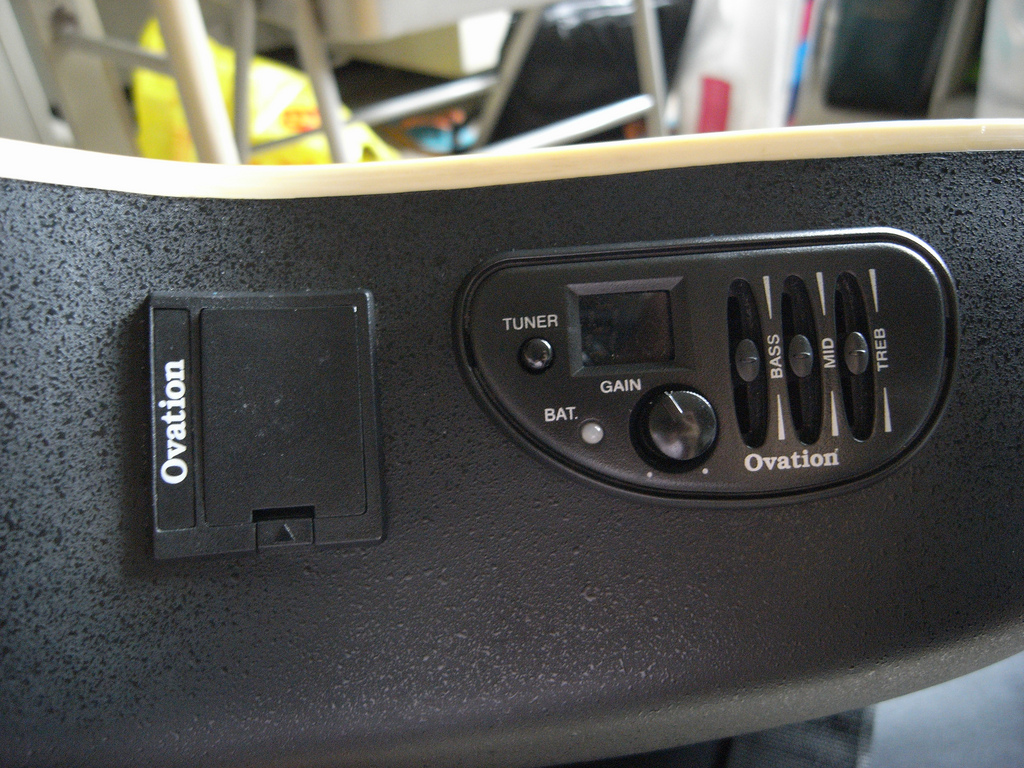
Shallow-bodied Ovation guitars have been recommended in Guitar Craft.

Fripp recommended that students adopt the Ovation 1867 Legend steel-string guitar, which had a shallow body. "Fripp liked the way the Ovation 1867 fitted against his body, which made it possible for him to assume the right-arm picking position he had developed using electric guitars over the years; on deeper-bodied guitars, the Frippian arm position is impossible without uncomfortable contortions", according to Tamm. While the 1867 Legend is no longer manufactured, it influenced the design of the Guitar Craft Pro Model of Guitar Craft Guitars, which has been endorsed by Fripp. Besides the Ovation 1867 Legend, other Ovation shallow-body guitars are widely used in Guitar Craft and recommended for use in related performing groups, such as the Guitar Circle of Europe. The Ovation's truss rod can offset the increased tension of the NST strings, protecting the neck from bending.

=== Personal development ===
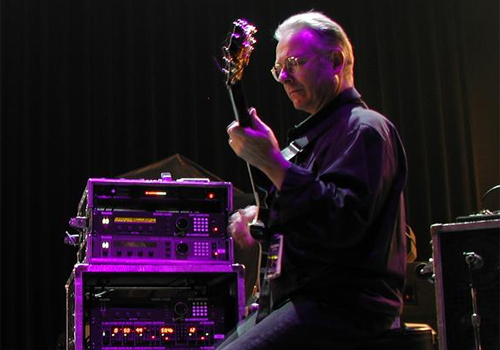
Robert Fripp introduces Guitar Craft students to the morning practice of relaxed sitting.

Guitar Craft aimed at personal development, not only through guitar playing and music appreciation, but also through improved living. Students were offered instruction in practices such as relaxed sitting, Tai chi, and the Alexander Technique. These practices are valuable especially for guitarists, who practice for at least an hour daily and therefore benefit from a stable and comfortable posture. While relaxed sitting has been practiced in Hinduism and Buddhism, the GC practice of relaxed sitting is pursued without reference to any religious tradition. Participants are encouraged to think critically and particularly to feel free to decline any practice as they see fit.

== Crafty guitarists ==
Courses take place regularly in Latin America, North America, and Europe. By 2011, three thousand students had completed courses. Students who have completed a GC course and who continue GC practices are called "crafty guitarists" or "crafties". Notable crafties include Trey Gunn and the California Guitar Trio, who joined Fripp in forming the Robert Fripp String Quintet. GC-related Guitar Circles and other ensembles perform in Europe, the US, Argentina, and Mexico.

=== League of Crafty Guitarists ===
GC's official performance ensemble has been The League of Crafty Guitarists. Robert Fripp and the League of Crafty Guitarists has released several albums, via Discipline Global Mobile. The League of Crafty Guitarists has been directed by Hernán Nuñez since 2002; Nuñez, a long-time instructor of GC, is one of the developers of the Guitar Craft Pro Model, whose design has been influenced by that of the Ovation Legend. For organizational logos, Guitar Craft and the League of Crafty Guitarists use a knotwork design, which was inspired by the red knotwork design appearing on later covers of the Discipline album by King Crimson; both designs were made by Steve Ball.

=== Alumni ===
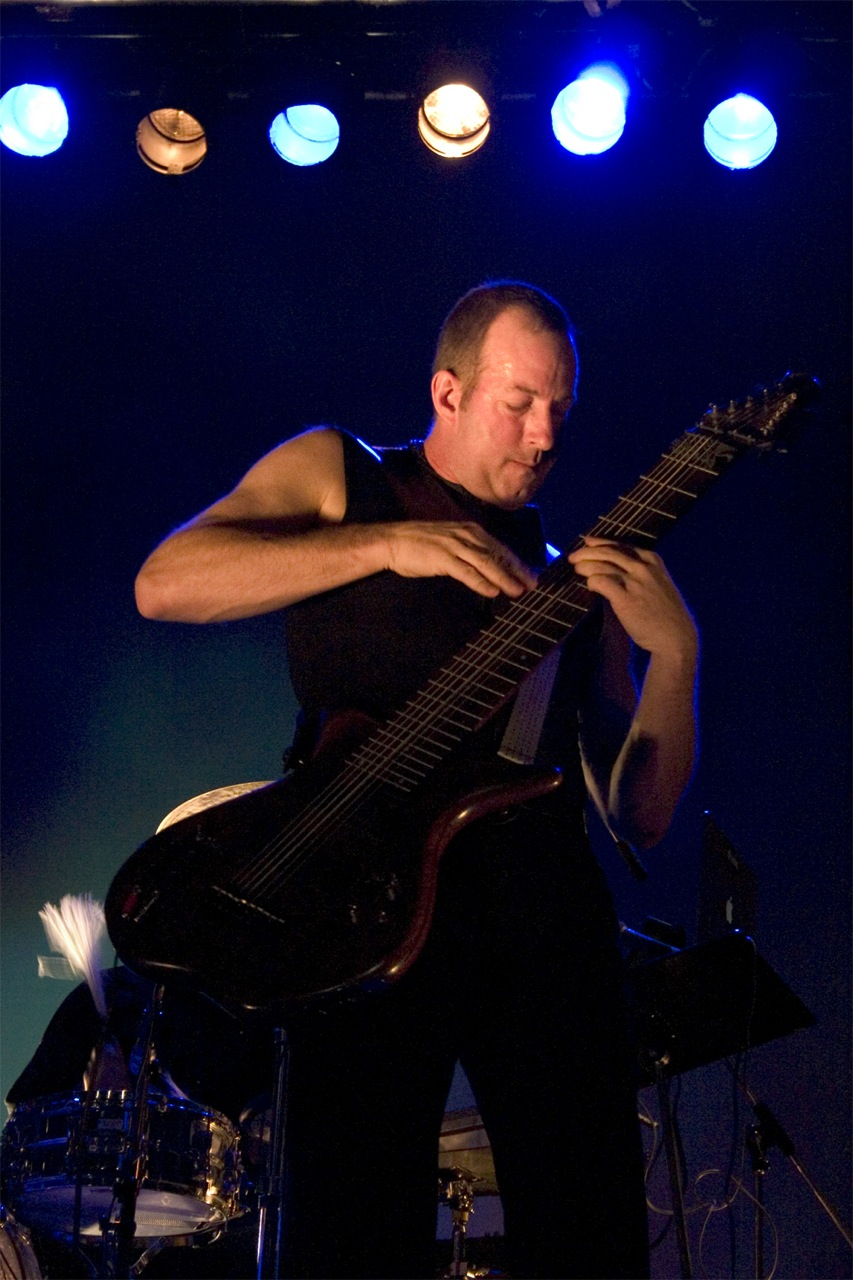
Warr-guitarist Trey Gunn studied with Robert Fripp in Guitar Craft, before joining King Crimson.

The Guitar-Craft experience and the League of Crafty Guitarists trained guitarists who went on to form new bands or work with Fripp or his associates in various settings. Examples include the California Guitar Trio and Trey Gunn; the California Guitar Trio and Gunn toured with Fripp as The Robert Fripp String Quintet.

Bill Rieflin was best known as a drummer, but also played other instruments including guitar. He developed "a musical style that beautifully balances mindfulness and force" through his long association with Guitar Craft. In 2011 Rieflin stated that "I couldn't possibly describe in any detail the impact this has had in my life; I can say that it was and continues to be significant. Were I to say 'life-changing,' this would be true, but it wouldn't begin to communicate the depth of the experience." Rieflin worked with Fripp on a number of projects, and later joined King Crimson as a drummer and keyboardist.

Davide Rossi, violinist with Goldfrapp and Coldplay, regarded Guitar Craft and Karlheinz Stockhausen tutelage as the most important experiences in shaping his musical style.

Other alumni of the League of Crafty Guitarists include members of Los Gauchos Alemanes, such as U.S. guitarist Steve Ball; Ball is associated with the Seattle Guitar Circle, along with LCG alumnus Curt Golden.

German crafty Markus Reuter went on to play Warr Guitar in Europa String Choir and centrozoon, subsequently designing his own touch guitar and playing in Stick Men and The Crimson ProjeKct in addition to a solo career. The collection A Plague of Crafty Guitarists features the following Guitar-Craft alumni, who were listed in a review by Barry Cleveland: Tobin Buttram, Nigel Gavin, David Pittaway, Geary Street Quartet, Bill Hibbits, Janssen and Jensen, Sur Pacifico, Playmovil, and Santos Luminosos.

== Guitar Circle: successor of Guitar Craft ==
In February 2009, Fripp recommended that Guitar Craft cease to exist on its 25th anniversary in 2010. In March 2010, a 25th Anniversary Course marking the Completion of Guitar Craft was held. In practice, Guitar Craft continues with a focus on Guitar Circles and The Orchestra of Crafty Guitarists. Courses entitled "Introduction to Guitar Circle" continue to be held in the Americas and in Europe. The website of Guitar Craft contains links to related and successor organizations and associations. Guitar Craft inspired the founding of the Seattle Guitar Circle and the Seattle Circle Guitar School in 2010.

== See also ==
- John G. Bennett § International Academy for Continuous Education
