= Last Day of June =

2017 adventure puzzle video game

- Developer: Ovosonico
- Publisher: 505 Games
- Director: Massimo Guarini
- Producer: Elia Randon
- Designer: Mattia Traverso
- Programmer: Briano Casotto
- Artist: Francesco Abbonizio
- Writers: Massimo Guarini; Mattia Traverso; Brenden Gibbons
- Composer: Steven Wilson
- Engine: Unity
- Platforms: PlayStation 4; Microsoft Windows; Nintendo Switch
- Release: PlayStation 4, Windows; 31 August 2017; Nintendo Switch; 16 March 2018
- Genres: Adventure, puzzle
- Mode: Single-player

Last Day of June is an adventure puzzle video game developed by Ovosonico and published by 505 Games. It is based on Steven Wilson's song Drive Home. The game was released for the PlayStation 4 and Windows in August 2017, and ported for the Nintendo Switch in March 2018.

== Gameplay ==
Last Day of June incorporates elements of adventure and puzzle games in a third-person perspective. The player initially controls Carl, who is on a date with June at the lake, on the day leading up to their car accident. The game then moves back to the day before the crash, where the player now controls June at their house, and Carl shortly after. Then it switches back to their date at the lake, where the player controls Carl again, and drive back to their home. Afterwards, the player controls Carl in their house at a later date, and discovers that June's paintings can be interacted with. This allows the player to take control of various characters from the day of the accident in an attempt to solve puzzles and alter the sequence of events that indirectly caused the accident. As the player fails to prevent June's death, new paintings and characters are unlocked to allow for an increasingly complex sequence of changes. Throughout the game, the player alternately controls six characters (in chronological order: Carl, June, The Kid, The Best Friend, The Hunter, and The Old Man).

== Plot ==
Last Day of June is centred around Carl and June, a couple who suffers a tragedy when a car accident kills June and leaves Carl in a wheelchair. One day, Carl touches one of June's paintings of people who had been present on the day of the accident and discovers that he can revisit their memories. As Carl relives their memories, the characters can perform actions that change the sequence of events that led up to June's death.

Carl manages to prevent the initial accident, but another event causes the car crash. He continues to change events multiple times, but each attempt still results in the accident by different circumstances. In the finale of the game, Carl finds a sketchbook made by June which lists attempts by her to save him, rather than the other way around, and realizes that he cannot change what happens, the crash is inevitable and somebody will die on that day. Seeing no other option, Carl goes back in time to the day of the crash and swaps seats with June. By doing this, he is the one who dies in the wreck, sacrificing his life to save his wife and unborn child. The game ends with June visiting Carl's grave, which sits atop a hill facing the lake.

== Score ==
All tracks are written by Steven Wilson

No.	Title	Based on	Length
1.	"Some Things Cannot Be Changed"	"Belle de Jour" from Grace for Drowning	2:58
2.	"That Day by the Pier"	"Year of the Plague" from 4½	3:58
3.	"There Must Be a Way"	Title track from Bass Communion "Chiaroscuro"	1:17
4.	"The Last Day of June"	"Routine" from Hand. Cannot. Erase.	8:18
5.	"Suspended in Me"	"Loss – Part 2" from Bass Communion "Loss"	1:09
6.	"Driving Home"	Title track from The Raven That Refused to Sing (And Other Stories)	1:39
7.	"I'm Still Here..."	"Raider II" from Grace for Drowning	1:35
8.	"The Boy Who Lost His Friends"	"Deform to Form a Star" from Grace for Drowning	2:16
9.	"The Crib"	"After Dark" from Bass Communion "Box Set"	1:05
10.	"Time for a New Start"	Title track from Insurgentes	3:27
11.	"Suspended in You"	"Haze 1402" from Bass Communion "Molotov and Haze"	1:18
12.	"Under the Shadow of My Father"	"Track One" from Grace for Drowning	1:29
13.	"Accept"	"Veneno para las hadas" from Insurgentes	4:13
14.	"Deceive"	"Ghosts on Magnetic Tape V" from Bass Communion "Ghosts on Magnetic Tape"	1:07
15.	"Together, Forever Again"	"Significant Other" from Insurgentes	3:52

== Development and release ==
Last Day of June was developed by Italian studio Ovosonico and published by 505 Games. The game was directed by Massimo Guarini, who based Last Day of June on the song "Drive Home" by British musician Steven Wilson. Wilson himself was involved in composing music for the game.

The game was announced in May 2017, and released for the PlayStation 4 and Windows on 31 August 2017.

== Reception ==
Reception

Aggregate score
Aggregator	Score
Metacritic	PC: 75/100; PS4: 75/100; NS: 76/100

Review scores
Publication	Score
Destructoid	8/10
Eurogamer	Recommended
Polygon	8.5/10

Last Day of June was received favourably by critics. Eurogamer ranked it 33rd on their list of the "Top 50 Games of 2017", while Polygon ranked it 38th on their list of the 50 best games of 2017. In Adventure Gamers' Aggie Awards 2017, it won the award for "Best Story", while it was a runner-up each for "Best Concept", "Best Graphic Design", and "Best Non-Traditional Adventure". It was also nominated for "Game Beyond Entertainment" at the 14th British Academy Games Awards.
