= Untitled (Bass Communion Box) =

Box set by Bass Communion
- Released: 20 May 2014
- Recorded: 1998–2012
- Genre: Ambient, experimental, drone
- Length: 245:57
- Label: Tonefloat
- Producer: Steven Wilson
- Compiler: Steven Wilson

Bass Communion chronology
Cenotaph (2011)	Untitled (2014)

Untitled (or box set) is a box set compilation of songs released by British musician, songwriter, and producer Steven Wilson under the pseudonym Bass Communion. It contains many rarities from the last 15 years of Steven's ambient and drone work, especially from vinyl-only editions of Bass Communion albums. It also features the previously unreleased track "Temporal", recorded in 2012 as a homage to composer Harrison Birtwistle and his 1971 composition "Chronometer" – both pieces are created entirely from the sounds of clocks and other timekeeping devices.

Only 2000 copies were made, with each disc housed in a mini LP cover with inner sleeve, and a 64-page booklet. The set is a mail order exclusive to Headphone Dust and ToneFloat.

== Track listing ==
Disc One: Vajrayana / Indicates Void
No.	Title	Length
1.	"Vajrayana (2001)"	8:46
2.	"Aum Shinrikyo (2001)"	9:11
3.	"Ghosts On Magnetic Tape - Outtake (2003)"	16:04
4.	"Indicates Void I (2005)"	10:40
5.	"Indicates Void II (2005)"	8:21
6.	"Indicated Void III (2005)"	11:16
7.	"Indicates Void IV (1998)"	9:18

- Tracks 1 and 2 released in edited form on 7 inch single in 2004. These are previously unreleased full length versions.
- Track 3 released on Ghosts on Magnetic Tape 2lp Vinyl Edition in 2006.
- Tracks 4 - 7 released as Indicates Void in a limited edition of 300 vinyl lps in 2005.

Disc Two: Pacific Codex
No.	Title	Length
1.	"Pacific Codex (2006)"	40:21

- Released as Pacific Codex in a limited edition of 1000 CD/DVDA box sets in 2008.

Disc Three: Reconstructions
No.	Title	Length
1.	"After Dark (2003)"	9:30
2.	"Mousehill (2006)"	10:00
3.	"Behind These Silent Eyes (2006)"	18:48
4.	"537171NR848492C (2007)"	19:42
5.	"Wvndrkmmer (2008)"	8:30

- Track 1 is a reconstruction of Darkroom, released on "the DAC mixes" cdr in 2004.
- Track 2 is a reconstruction of The Use of Ashes, released on 10 inch vinyl in 2008.
- Track 3 is a reconstruction of Theo Travis - a different version was released on "slow life" 2lp vinyl in 2007. This version is previously unreleased.
- Track 4 is a reconstruction of Andrew Liles, released in 2007 on "black sheep" cd.
- Track 5 is a reconstruction of Pyramids, released in 2010 on "Wvndrkmmer" 5 x cassette box set.

Disc Four: Litany / Temporal
No.	Title	Length
1.	"Litany 1 (2009)"	6:43
2.	"Litany 2 (2009)"	15:25
3.	"The Flight of Song (2009)"	22:17
4.	"Temporal A (2012)"	10:10
5.	"Temporal B (2012)"	10:25

- Tracks 1 and 2 released as Litany 12 inch vinyl in 2009
- Track 3 is a reconstruction of 3 Seconds of Air, released on "The Flight of Song" vinyl lp in 2009
- Tracks 4 and 5 are previously unreleased. All sounds derived from recordings of clocks and other time keeping devices.

== Credits ==
Steven Wilson - All instruments, except as noted
Ben Castle - Clarinets on "Indicates Void II"
Theo Travis - Saxophone on "Indicates Void IV"

All tracks written by Steven Wilson, except:
Source material for "Pacific Codex" written and performed by Theo Travis and Steven Wilson using Steve Hubback's metal sculptures
Source material for "After Dark" written and performed by Darkroom
Source material for "Mousehill" written and performed by The Use of Ashes
Source material for "Behind These Silent Eyes" written and performed by Theo Travis
Source material for "537171NR848492C" written and performed by Andrew Liles
Source material for "Wvndrkmmer" written and performed by Pyramids
Source material for "The Flight of Song" written and performed by 3 Seconds of Air. (Dirk Serries, Martina Verhoeven, Paul Van Den Berg)
