= Swagger (EP) =

EP by No Man Is An Island
- Released: Original cassette: November 1989; Re-release: January 26, 2024
- Genre: Art rock, art pop
- Label: Hidden Art; Independent
- Producer: Steven Wilson

No Man Is An Island chronology
The Girl From Missouri (1989)	Swagger (1990)	Days In The Trees (1991)

"Swagger" is a cassette EP, and later compilation album and the second release by the then British trio No Man Is An Island, which would later rename and be known simply as No-Man.

The cassette was made for the band to sell at concerts. It was later described by the band themselves as "very much a transitional release, with the band at an uncomfortable position between brash synthpop, abrasive art rock and the lusher atmospheres which would later become a No-Man trademark."

Some promo versions also included "The Girl From Missouri" (the earlier self-titled debut release). "Bleed" was featured in two subsequent versions - one on the 'Sweetheart Raw' EP and one on 'Heaven Taste'.

The song "Flowermouth" has no link with the Flowermouth album besides the title (although parts of the song were recycled for "Lovecry" on their 1993 debut LP Loveblows & Lovecries - A Confession). "Life Is Elsewhere" comes from Tim Bowness' former band Plenty (later renamed Samuel Smiles).

In 2024, No-Man released an updated version of the EP with additional songs in conjunction with the box set "Housekeeping: The OLI Years". Track 5 was recorded in the same sessions as the songs on the original "Swagger" EP. Tracks 6–9 were recorded in Steven Wilson's home studio between 1989 and 1990.

== Track listing ==
All tracks are written by Steven Wilson, except track A2 by Brian Husle.

Side A
No.	Title	Length
1.	"Flowermouth"	5:00
2.	"Life Is Elsewhere"	4:22

Side B
No.	Title	Length
1.	"Bleed"	5:14
2.	"Mouth Was Blue"	4:58

Re-Release: Swagger - Lost Not Lost Volume One: 1989/1990

1. Flowermouth - 5:06
2. Bleed - 5:15
3. Life Is Elsewhere - 4:22
4. Mouth Was Blue - 5:03
5. Curtain Dream - 3:12
6. Learn To Fear - 5:28
7. See No Angels - 5:23
8. Sit Silent - 3:08
9. Swirl - 7:41
