= All the Blue Changes – An Anthology 1988–2003 =

All The Blue Changes – An Anthology 1988–2003

Compilation album by No-Man
- Released: 27 February 2006
- Recorded: 1988–2003
- Genres: Ambient, trip hop, dream pop, art rock
- Label: Hidden Art
- Producers: Tim Bowness, Steven Wilson

No-Man chronology
| Lost Songs Vol. 1 (2001) | All The Blue Changes – An Anthology 1988–2003 (2006) |

Professional ratings
Review scores
| Source | Rating |
|---|---|
| AllMusic | 3.5/5 stars |

All The Blue Changes – An Anthology 1988–2003 is a double CD compilation by British art rock group No-Man, spanning their entire career – from the Speak sessions in 1988 up until the release of Together We're Stranger in 2003. Many songs are unreleased versions of No-Man songs.

== Track listing ==
CD 1
| No. | Title | Length |
|---|---|---|
| 1. | "Pink Moon" | 3:04 |
| 2. | "Colours" | 4:09 |
| 3. | "Days In The Trees (previously unreleased mix)" | 7:11 |
| 4. | "Reich" | 2:34 |
| 5. | "Walker (previously unreleased album outtake from 1991)" | 3:24 |
| 6. | "Back To The Burning Shed" | 2:47 |
| 7. | "Road" | 3:18 |
| 8. | "Housekeeping" | 5:31 |
| 9. | "Heaven Taste (new edit, previously unreleased)" | 10:31 |
| 10. | "Watching Over Me" | 4:43 |
| 11. | "Simple" | 7:05 |
| 12. | "Things Change" | 7:30 |

CD 2
| No. | Title | Length |
|---|---|---|
| 1. | "Pretty Genius" | 3:51 |
| 2. | "My Revenge On Seattle (previously unreleased single edit/mix)" | 4:47 |
| 3. | "Dry Cleaning Ray (previously unreleased edit)" | 3:28 |
| 4. | "Sicknote" | 8:11 |
| 5. | "Carolina Skeletons" | 5:08 |
| 6. | "Something Falls" | 3:28 |
| 7. | "Only Rain" | 7:26 |
| 8. | "Returning Jesus" | 5:19 |
| 9. | "Chelsea Cap" | 5:23 |
| 10. | "Photographs In Black And White" | 10:03 |
| 11. | "The Break Up For Real (drum mix) (previously unavailable on CD)" | 3:58 |
| 12. | "(Bluecoda) (previously unavailable on CD)" | 2:36 |

== Notes ==
The version of "Days In The Trees" which appears on "All The Blue Changes" is a different mix of the "Mahler" version which made considerable impact when released as a single – it also features a longer fadeout than the other versions. The version of "Dry Cleaning Ray" is a version of the single mix without a fade-out (running about 30 seconds longer), and "My Revenge On Seattle" is the unused alternate mix and edit made for a planned single release (before the band chose "Dry Cleaning Ray" instead). Of the rare tracks, "Walker" dates back to the 1991 sessions for "Loveblows & Lovecries" and would have featured on the initial track list for that album. "The Break Up For Real (Drum Mix)" and "(bluecoda)" both originally appeared on the limited-edition vinyl edition of "Together We're Stranger". -Steven-
