= Atmospherics (album) =

Compilation album by Bass Communion
- Released: 1999
- Recorded: Battery Studios, London
- Genres: Ambient; drone
- Length: 76:31
- Labels: Bruton Music; BRI 53
- Producer: Steven Wilson

Bass Communion chronology
II (1999)	Atmospherics (1999)	Vajrayana (2004)

Atmospherics is a collection of Bass Communion music released by library music company Bruton Music and distributed to media companies for use in television and radio programs. Some of the pieces are extracts and remixes of tracks from other Bass Communion albums.

It was never commercially available.

== Track listing ==
Includes descriptions provided to television and radio.

1. Spellbound [Magical, airy, building in tension.] - 2:33
2. Bliss [Warm, flowing, euphoric.] - 3:05
3. Past Lives [Slow, thoughtful over eerie crackling record.] - 2:36
4. The Fog [Gradually creeping, muffled, ominous.] - 2:07
5. Transcendence [Light, climbing, wondrous.] - 3:32
6. Heartbeat [Swelling, mysterious pulses.] - 2:40
7. Held under [Sinister, underwater pressure.] - 1:52
8. Mountain Peak [Calm, ethereal, steadily rising.] - 2:43
9. Night Creatures [Jungle at night, echoing noises.] - 2:38
10. Sonar [Soft, slowly progressing mystery.] - 2:16
11. Nostalgia [Sober, uneasy, surreal.] - 2:27
12. Acquiescence [Tranquil, spreading waves.] - 2:46
13. Edge of Darkness [Quietly threatening, danger approaching.] - 3:19
14. Sense of Awe [Gentle, tentative progression.] - 2:23
15. Desert Plains [Eerie minimalism.] - 2:34
16. Ethereal [Smooth gliding motion, increasing in pressure.] - 1:56
17. Sleepwalking [Spooky late night restlessness.] - 2:40
18. Aftermath [Haunting desolation.] - 2:33
- Tracks 19 - 36 are :60 edits of these titles.
- Tracks 37 - 54 are :30 edits of these titles.

== Track notes ==
Track 3 is a remixed extract of "16 Second Swarm" from II
Track 4 appears on III as "Grammatic Fog"
Track 5 is a remixed extract of track 2 ("Drugged") from I
Track 7 is an extended remixed version of "Advert" from II
Track 9 appears on III as "Lina Romay"
Track 10 appears on III as "Sonar"
Track 12 is a remixed extract of "Drugged III" from II
Track 17 is a remixed extract of "Sleep Etc" from I
Track 18 is a remixed extract of "Wide Open Killingfeld" from II

== Credits ==
Composed by Steven Wilson, except "Aftermath" written by Steven Wilson/Theo Travis
All instruments: Steven Wilson

Executive Producer: Jez Poole.
Recorded & mixed at Battery Studios, London, UK.
Mix Engineer: Steven Wilson.
Mastering: Chris Parmenidis, Battery Studios, London, UK.
Post-production Co-ordinator: Claire Leaver.
Graphic Designer: Jacquie O'Neill, Zomba Design
