= Have Come for Your Children =

Studio album by Incredible Expanding Mindfuck
- Released: September 2001
- Recorded: 1999
- Genres: Psychedelic rock; krautrock
- Length: 72:11 (CD); 80:22 (Vinyl)
- Labels: Gates of Dawn; GOD007; Headphone Dust; IEM1
- Producer: Steven Wilson

Incredible Expanding Mindfuck chronology
Arcadia Son (2001)	Have Come for Your Children (2001)	I.E.M. 1996–1999 (2005)

I.E.M. Have Come for Your Children is the third and final studio album from Steven Wilson's side project, Incredible Expanding Mindfuck. It was released on CD in 2001 on the Headphone Dust label. Tracks 1–5 use improvisations from 1999 as source material, heavily reconstructed and overdubbed in the studio in August 2001 while track 6 is a piece for hammered dulcimer and mellotron choir. An excerpt of track 1 appeared on the previous album, Arcadia Son, as the title track.

A double vinyl edition, released by the Gates of Dawn record label in 2003, included an additional track prior to track 5 that opens side D. This was later included on the Complete I.E.M. boxset CD version of the An Escalator to Christmas EP titled after this album.

== Track listing ==
All tracks written by Steven Wilson.

1. "Untitled 1" – 35:37
2. "Untitled 2" – 8:02
3. "Untitled 3" – 7:10
4. "Untitled 4" – 12:02
5. "Untitled 5" – 5:29
6. "Piece For Hammered Dulcimer And Mellotron Choir" – 4:31
7. "I.E.M. Have Come for Your Children" – 8:11 (Vinyl version only bonus track)
