= I.E.M. 1996–1999 =

Compilation album by Incredible Expanding Mindfuck
- Released: September 2005
- Recorded: 1996–1999
- Genres: Psychedelic rock, krautrock
- Length: 68:45
- Labels: Headphone Dust; HDIEMCD8; ToneFloat; TF32
- Producer: Steven Wilson

Incredible Expanding Mindfuck chronology
Have Come for Your Children (2001)	I.E.M. 1996–1999 (2005)	Complete I.E.M. (2010)

I.E.M. 1996–1999 is a compilation album from Steven Wilson's side project, the Incredible Expanding Mindfuck. It is a remastered collection of music recorded between 1996–99, and includes the whole of the first album I.E.M., the An Escalator to Christmas EP together with bonus material.

The original 2005 Headphone Dust version marked the first time that the An Escalator to Christmas EP had been available on CD. A subsequent limited edition of 500 copies was issued on white vinyl in 2007 by the ToneFloat label.

The artwork replicates that of the original I.E.M. album.

== Track listing ==
All tracks written by Steven Wilson.

1. "The Gospel According to the I.E.M." – 12:56
2. "The Last Will and Testament of Emma Peel" – 8:08
3. "Fie Kesh" – 8:23
4. "Deafman" – 9:02
5. "An Escalator to Christmas" – 10:33
6. "Headphone Dust" – 6:11
7. "Interview" – 0:27
8. "An Escalator to Christmas" (Extended Mix) – 13:04
