= IEM =

IEM can refer to:

- I.E.M. (album)
- Inborn error of metabolism
- In-ear monitors, devices used by musicians, audio engineers and audiophiles to listen to music
- Incredible Expanding Mindfuck (Music)
- Information Engineering Methodology
- Institute of Electronic Music and Acoustics (Institut für Elektronische Musik und Akustik), part of the University of Music and Performing Arts, Graz
- Institute of Engineering and Management
- Integrated Enterprise Modeling
- Institute of Engineering in Medicine, part of the University of California, San Diego
- Institute for Experimental Mathematics, a central scientific facility of the University of Duisburg-Essen
- Intel Extreme Masters, a series of international esports tournaments
- International emergency medicine
- Internet Explorer Mobile
- Ion evaporation model, a model explaining electrospray ionization in mass spectrometry
- Iowa Electronic Markets
- Internal Energy Market, of the European Union

== See also ==
- lem (disambiguation)
- 1Em
