= Mindfuck =

Mindfuck may refer to:

- A synonym for mind games for a manipulative abusive purpose.
- Operation Mindfuck, a principle of discordianism
- Incredible Expanding Mindfuck, an experimental music group founded by Steven Wilson
  - I.E.M. (album), eponymous debut album of said group
- "Mindfuck", a song by Ween, from their 1986 album The Crucial Squeegie Lip
- "Mindfuck (A New Equation)", a song by The Coup, from their 2006 album Pick a Bigger Weapon
- Mindfuck, a supporting character in Adam Warren's Empowered.
- "Mindfuck", a 2019 book by Christopher Wylie about the Facebook–Cambridge Analytica data scandal
- MINDF*CK, Dutch television show presented by Victor Mids
