= The Girl from Missouri (EP) =

EP by No Man Is an Island
- Released: May 1989
- Genre: Art rock, art pop
- Label: Plastic Head Records
- Producer: Steven Wilson

No Man Is an Island chronology
The Girl from Missouri (1989)	Swagger (1989)

The Girl from Missouri is an EP and the debut release by then British group No Man Is an Island, which would later reduce as a duo known simply as No-Man. Only 500 copies were made.

With the exception of the title track, all the songs were later included in the Speak cassette released in 1993, while only "The Ballet Beast" and "Night Sky Sweat Earth" made it to the commercial 1999 CD re-release (albeit with resung vocals).

== Track listing ==
Side A
No.	Title	Length
1.	"The Girl from Missouri"	3:43
2.	"Forest Almost Burning"	4:01

Side B
No.	Title	Length
1.	"Night Sky, Sweet Earth"	5:57
2.	"The Ballet Beast"	1:23
