= Live in Mexico City =

Live in Mexico City may refer to:

- Live in Mexico City (King Crimson album)
- Meltdown: Live in Mexico City, King Crimson, 2018
- Live in Mexico City (Bass Communion and Pig album)
- Live in Mexico City, Dark Lunacy, 2012
- Live in Mexico City, Lacrimosa (band), 2014
- Rammstein - Live in Mexico City, 2026
