= Bass Communion I =

I

Studio album by Bass Communion
- Released: April 1998
- Recorded: No-Man's Land 1993; 1995–1998
- Genre: Ambient, drone
- Length: 63:43
- Label: 3rd Stone
- Producer: Steven Wilson

Bass Communion chronology
I (1998)	II (1999)

Professional ratings
Review scores
Source	Rating
AllMusic	3.5/5 stars

I (or Bass Communion I) is the first studio album released by British musician, songwriter, and producer Steven Wilson under the pseudonym Bass Communion in 1998. It was reissued in December 2001 through Hidden Art record label.

The basis of both "Drugged" pieces were reused for the title track of No-Man's album Together We're Stranger as well as "Drugged 3" from Bass Communion II. Brief distorted extracts from the suite can also be heard on the 1996 song "Urban Disco," a b-side from the "Housewives Hooked on Heroin" single (of the Wild Opera album), recorded by No-Man, a Wilson project and collaboration with singer-songwriter Tim Bowness.

== Track listing ==
All tracks are written by Steven Wilson

No.	Title	Length
1.	"Shopping"	1:24
2.	"Drugged"	13:35
3.	"Sleep Etc."	13:29
4.	"Orphan Coal"	10:16
5.	"Drugged 2"	24:54

=== Bonus track on vinyl ===
- "No News Is Good News" – 8:10

== Personnel ==
=== Bass Communion ===
- Steven Wilson – instruments

=== Additional personnel ===
- Theo Travis – soprano saxophones on "Drugged"
- Robert Fripp – soundscapes on "Drugged 2" (sampled from a tape of soundscapes improvised by Fripp at No-Man's Land in 1993)
- Carl Glover – graphic design and photography

== Release history ==
Region	Date	Label	Format	Catalog
United Kingdom	April 1998	3rd Stone	CD	STONE 036CD
United Kingdom	December 2001	Hidden Art	CD reissue	HI-ART 9
UK & Europe	21 April 2018	Hidden Art	2x LP	HI-ART 9LP
United Kingdom	1 July 2022	Hidden Art	CD reissue	HI-ART 27
