= Dronework =

- Reissue cover by Carl Glover

EP by Bass Communion
- Released: November 2004
- Recorded: 24 August 2003
- Genre: Ambient\; drone
- Length: 20:16
- Label: Twenty Hertz; Headphone Dust; Coup Sur Coup; Tonefloat
- Producer: Steven Wilson

Bass Communion chronology
| Vajrayana (2004) | Dronework (2004) | Haze Shrapnel (2008) |

CDR Edition
- Front cover study of SW by Lasse Hoile

Dronework is an EP by Bass Communion, one of Steven Wilson's side projects. It consist of single title track. The CD-R was originally available as part of the Twenty Hertz Droneworks series as Drone Works #6. It was withdrawn in December 2004 and reissued on Wilson's own label, Headphone Dust in March 2005. The album was reissued again in July 2008 as a factory pressed CD through Headphone Dust, on compact cassette through Coup Sur Coup Records, and on vinyl through Tonefloat.

== Track listing ==
All music is composed by Steven Wilson

| No. | Title | Length |
|---|---|---|
| 1. | "Dronework" | 20:16 |

== Release history ==
| Region | Date | Label | Format | Catalog |
|---|---|---|---|---|
| United Kingdom | November 2004 | Twenty Hertz | CD-R | |
| United Kingdom | March 2005 | Headphone Dust | CD | HDBCCD14 |
| United Kingdom | August 2008 | Headphone Dust | CD reissue | HDBCCD14x |
| Canada | September 20, 2019 | Coup Sur Coup | cassette | CSC-014 |
| Netherlands | October 22, 2021 | Tonefloat | LP | TF201 |
