= Arcadia Son =

Studio album by Incredible Expanding Mindfuck
- Released: May 2001
- Recorded: 1999–2000
- Genres: Psychedelic rock, krautrock
- Length: 45:14
- Labels: Gates of Dawn; GOD006; Headphone Dust; IEM2
- Producer: Steven Wilson

Incredible Expanding Mindfuck chronology
An Escalator to Christmas (1999)	Arcadia Son (2001)	Have Come for Your Children (2001)

Arcadia Son is the second album from Steven Wilson's side project, Incredible Expanding Mindfuck. The original vinyl edition was limited to 500 copies and released in May 2001 on the Gates of Dawn record label. A CD version was subsequently released in January 2002 on Headphone Dust.

All music was performed and projected by the IEM 1999-2000 except "Goldilocks Age 4" 1972.

Several pieces are extended on the 2010 complete box set, with "We Are Not Alone" in particular gaining an extra 30 seconds.

== Track listing ==
All tracks written by Steven Wilson.

1. "Wreck" – 1:24
2. "Beth Krasky" – 0:26
3. "We Are Not Alone" – 7:24
4. "Cicadian Haze" – 6:11
5. "Politician" – 1:04
6. "Arcadia Son" - 7:52
7. "Shadow of a Twisted Hand Across My House" - 20:23
8. "Goldilocks Age 4" - 1:10
