= Cenotaph (Bass Communion album) =

Studio album by Bass Communion
- Released: 10 November 2011
- Recorded: January 2010 – June 2011
- Genre: Ambient, drone
- Length: 77:18 (CD); 78:32 (LP)
- Label: Tonefloat
- Producer: Steven Wilson

Bass Communion chronology
Chiaroscuro (2009)	Cenotaph (2011)	The Itself of Itself (2024)

Cenotaph is the ninth studio album released by British musician, songwriter and producer Steven Wilson under the pseudonym Bass Communion.

The album varies from the vinyl version to the CD version but primarily consists of four 20-minute tracks which according to Wilson are "closest in style to previous albums such as Ghosts on Magnetic Tape and Loss, but looser in a way". The album was recorded during the same sessions as Steven Wilson's second solo album Grace for Drowning, and was used in place of an opening act for shows on the 2011-2012 Grace for Drowning tour.

The album was mixed differently for vinyl than CD versions in that the latter makes more use of rhythm, while the vinyl mix is more ambient. Even though both versions have different mixes, the track length of each track remains almost the same except for the second and final track, the former which runs about a minute, the latter which runs around 20 seconds longer than the CD version.

== Track listing ==
No.	Title	Length
1.	"Citadel (q)"	19:09
2.	"Carrion (u)"	CD:21:19 LP:22:16
3.	"Cenotaph (r)"	19:01
4.	"Conflux (n)"	CD:17:49 LP:18:06

== Personnel ==
- Steven Wilson – performer
- Theo Travis – trombone (guest)
- Carl Glover – graphic design and photography

== Release history ==
Region	Date	Label	Format	Quantity	Catalog
Netherlands	10 November 2011	Tonefloat	CD		tf116
Netherlands	10 November 2011	Tonefloat	Double LP	700	tf114
