= LEM =

LEM may refer to:

- LEM, a musical instrument with the brand name Generalmusic
- Lake Erie Monsters (now the Cleveland Monsters), a professional ice hockey team based in Ohio
- Lamina emergent mechanism, found in pop-up books
- Law of excluded middle, in classical logic
- Lay Eucharistic Minister, in the Catholic, Episcopal or Lutheran Churches
- Learnable Evolution Model, an evolutionary computation method
- LEM domain-containing protein 3, a membrane protein associated with laminopathies
- Leyton Midland Road railway station in the United Kingdom, station code LEM
- Liquid Elastomer Molding, a gasket technology developed by the Federal-Mogul Corporation
- Luís Eduardo Magalhães, Bahia, a city in the state of Bahia, Brazil
- Lunar Excursion Module, the original designation of the Apollo Lunar Module
- Lymphocyte expansion molecule

== See also ==
- Lem (disambiguation)
