= Heaven Taste =

Compilation album by No-Man
- Released: 18 September 1995
- Recorded: 1991–1995
- Genre: Post rock, art rock, ambient
- Length: 41:37
- Label: Hidden Art
- Producer: Tim Bowness, Steven Wilson

No-Man chronology
Lovesighs – An Entertainment (1992)	Heaven Taste (1995)	Flowermix (1995)

Reissue
- 2002 remastered version

Professional ratings
Review scores
Source	Rating
Allmusic	3/5 stars

Heaven Taste is a compilation of B-sides and rarities released by British art rock band No-Man in 1995 and remastered in 1998. It consists on a collection of unreleased music recorded in a range of years between 1991 and 1995. The sound of the songs is often similar to Nick Drake, Talk Talk and Steve Reich. In May 2002 Heaven Taste was remastered and released with new cover art. The title track on this reissue is slightly longer. The version of Nick Drake's "Road" was originally featured on the 1991 Nick Drake tribute album, Brittle Days.

== Track listing ==
1. "Long Day Fall" (Tim Bowness, Steven Wilson, Ben Coleman) – 5:19
  date: July 1992
2. "Babyship Blue" (Bowness, Wilson) – 4:53
  date: June 1993, remix: May 1995
3. "Bleed" (Bowness, Wilson) – 6:50
  date: November 1992, remix: December 1994
4. "Road" (Nick Drake) – 3:16
  date: December 1991
5. "Heaven Taste" (Wilson) – 21:21 (22:30 on 2002 release)
  date: August 1992

== Personnel ==
- Tim Bowness – vocals and words on tracks 1 to 4
- Steven Wilson – instruments and backing vocals
- Richard Barbieri – keyboards and programming on track 5
- Ben Coleman – acoustic and electric violins on tracks 1, 2, and 5
- Steve Jansen – drums and percussion programming on track 5
- Mick Karn – fretless bass, dida, and saxophone on track 5
