= Incredible Expanding Mindfuck =

Experimental music project (1996–2001)

Background information
- Origin: Hemel Hempstead, Hertfordshire, England.
- Genres: Krautrock; psychedelic rock
- Years active: 1996–2001
- Labels: Chromatic; Delerium; Tone Float; Gates of Dawn; Headphone Dust
- Past members: Steven Wilson
- Website: Steven Wilson Headquarters

Incredible Expanding Mindfuck, commonly abbreviated as I.E.M., was a solo project by Steven Wilson (the lead of British rock band Porcupine Tree). Its work was mainly influenced by Krautrock and experimental music from the 1960s and 1970s.

== Background and history ==
I.E.M. is seldom discussed in any depth by Wilson in interviews and the album packaging provides very little information. The name "Incredible Expanding Mindfuck" is an in-joke referring to early Porcupine Tree promotional material (in which Porcupine Tree was given an entirely fictional 1970s history and in which the Incredible Expanding Mindfuck was mentioned as a related project).

Wilson's work with I.E.M. is in part a continuation of the experimental psychedelic sound which he initially mastered with Porcupine Tree before steering the band towards a more mainstream rock direction with the Stupid Dream album. He has also cited "the cosmic jazz of artists like Sun Ra" as an influence on the music.

I.E.M.'s work is more experimental in nature than that of Porcupine Tree, and is almost entirely instrumental. Almost all instruments on I.E.M. recordings are played by Wilson (although other contributors have included former Bark Psychosis drummer Mark Simnett).

The first I.E.M release was a self-titled album on Porcupine Tree's original record label Delerium Records in 1996. It was followed by a limited-edition single called An Escalator to Christmas. Further releases have occasionally followed, with little fanfare or direct promotion.

I.E.M.'s most recent release of entirely new music was in 2001 (although 2005's compilation album I.E.M. 1996-1999 included some previously unreleased material). The project has increasingly taken a back seat to Wilson's other projects, most notably to Porcupine Tree, Blackfield and Bass Communion, but also to No-Man, then to Wilson's recent solo release Insurgentes (which itself contains developments of some of the ideas Wilson has previously explored with I.E.M.) and continue to another six Wilson's solo release.

A 4-CD boxset featuring I.E.M., An Escalator to Christmas, Arcadia Son and I.E.M. Have Come for Your Children was released on ToneFloat records in June 2010. Limited to 2,000 copies, the boxset is described as "both an homage and a final farewell to I.E.M". Each CD is packaged in its own Japanese-style mini LP sleeve within a hardback slipcase box. It also includes a 60-page booklet designed by Carl Glover.

== Discography ==
- 1996 - I.E.M.
- 1999 - An Escalator to Christmas
- 2001 - Arcadia Son
- 2001 - I.E.M. Have Come for Your Children
- 2005 - I.E.M. 1996-1999
- 2010 - Complete I.E.M.
