= Pacific Codex =

- Cover design by Carl Glover

Studio album by Bass Communion
- Released: February 2008
- Recorded: 9 January 2006
- Genre: Ambient, drone
- Length: 40:18
- Label: Equation, Tonefloat, Headphone Dust.
- Producer: Steven Wilson

Bass Communion chronology
Loss (2006)	Pacific Codex (2008)	Molotov and Haze (2008)

Inner Sleeve
- Inner Sleeve Cover by Carl Glover

Professional ratings
Review scores
Source	Rating
AllMusic	3/5 stars

Pacific Codex is the name of the seventh studio album released by British musician, songwriter and producer Steven Wilson under the pseudonym Bass Communion.

The album consists of two discs containing the title track mixed in stereo in a CD and the 5.1 Surround Sound mix in a DVD-A. The song can be split into two sections as displayed in the cover of the Equation Records edition. All sounds were generated from recordings of Steve Hubback's metal sculptures, played by Steven Wilson and Theo Travis. The record is packaged in a card gatefold-style jacket in a slipcase, along with a book containing images of the sea by Carl Glover. Each copy also contains a hand-numbered card insert. Only 975 copies were printed, and they sold out within two days after the release date.

Five test pressings of the album on vinyl LP were produced, each consisting of two single-sided LPs with plain white labels and no sleeve. The pressings were rejected due to poor sound quality, and a vinyl LP edition was never released.

== Track listing ==
CD (Stereo Mix)
No.	Title	Length
1.	"Pacific Codex 1"	20:24
2.	"Pacific Codex 2"	19:54

DVDA (5.1 Surround Sound Mix)
No.	Title	Length
1.	"Pacific Codex"	40:18
