= Flowermix =

Remix album by No-Man
- Released: March 1995 (Cassette); 2 October 1995 (CD)
- Recorded: 1994–1995
- Genre: Dance, ambient
- Length: 71:27
- Label: Hidden Art
- Producer: Tim Bowness, Steven Wilson

No-Man chronology
Heaven Taste (1995)	Flowermix (1995)	Dry Cleaning Ray (1997)

Professional ratings
Review scores
Source	Rating
Allmusic	4/5 stars

Flowermix is a remix album by British Art rock band No-Man made by the band and selected underground remixers. It is a compilation of remixed and reworked songs from their Flowermouth album.

== Track listing ==
All songs by Bowness / Wilson

=== Cassette ===
This version of "Flowermix", which was briefly available before being withdrawn in favor of the CD re-release, features two otherwise unavailable tracks – the instrumental version of "Babyship Blue" (complementing the full vocal version on "Heaven Taste") and "Witching Ovaries", an indie-psychedelic guitar-rock remix of "Watching Over Me".

Side A

1. "Angeldust" (9:10)
2. "Faith In You" (10:44)
3. "All I See" (6:52)

Side B

1. "Witching Ovaries" (4:48)
2. "Heal the Madness" (6:51)
3. "Babyship Blue" (4:59)
4. "Sample" (9:00)

=== CD ===
1. "Angeldust" (9:08)
2. "Faith In You" (10:38)
3. "All I See" (6:52)
4. "Natural Neck" (5:20)
5. "Heal the Madness" (6:51)
6. "You Grow More Beautiful" (version) (4:21)
7. "Sample" (8:57)
8. "Why the Noise?" (4:04)
9. "Born Simple" (12:03)

== Personnel ==
- Tim Bowness – vocals, words
- Steven Wilson – instruments
- Ben Coleman – violins (4,8)
- Mel Collins – soprano saxophone (1), flute (8)
- Robert Fripp – guitar (1), soundscapes (1,5,7,9)
- David Kosten – production / remix (4,8)
- Silas Maitland – bass loop (1)
- Os – production / remix (3,7)
- The Prophets Of Bliss – production / remix (2)

== Release history ==
Region	Date	Label	Format	Catalog
United Kingdom	March 1995	Hidden Art Mail Order	Cassette	Deleted
United Kingdom	September 1995	Hidden Art	CD	HI-ART 2 (Deleted)
