= The Itself of Itself =

Studio album by Bass Communion
- Released: 24 May 2024
- Recorded: 2014–2023
- Genre: Ambient; drone; noise
- Length: 62:31
- Producer: Steven Wilson

Bass Communion chronology
Cenotaph (2011)	The Itself of Itself (2024)

The Itself of Itself is the tenth studio album by English musician, songwriter, and producer Steven Wilson under the stage name Bass Communion, released in Europe on 24 May, 2024 and in the US on 30 May 2024. It is the first full-length Bass Communion release in over twelve years. Its release was preceded by the reissuing of the entire Bass Communion catalogue on major music streaming platforms such as Spotify and Apple Music. To promote the album's release, Wilson performed a set as Bass Communion at Cafe Oto in London on 18 May, as part of a bill of various Fourth Dimension Records artists.

According to Bass Communion's Bandcamp page, "The Itself of Itself was selected from ten years worth of recordings, the ones chosen being those that [Steven Wilson] felt added something a bit different to the catalogue."

The album has been described as "unsettling, disturbing, challenging, and uneasy" in regards to the experimental and often harsh nature of the sounds. It has simultaneously been hailed as Wilson's "most uncompromising and adventurous" musical project due to these qualities.

The album received a physical release exclusively on CD, in a limited edition of 1,000 initial copies, which was increased to 1,500 copies due to demand. The package features a deluxe gatefold card cover, with a 24 page booklet of photographs and an OBI strip, designed by Carl Glover.

== Track listing ==
All tracks are written by Steven Wilson.

No.	Title	Length
1.	"Unperson"	10:33
2.	"Apparition 3"	6:04
3.	"Bruise"	13:19
4.	"Blackmail"	7:24
5.	"The Itself of Itself"	10:24
6.	"Study for Tape Hiss and Other Audio Artefacts"	11:58
7.	"Apparition 5"	2:45
Total length:		62:31

== Personnel ==
- Steven Wilson – performer
- Carl Glover – graphic design and photography

== Release history ==
Region	Date	Label	Format	Quantity	Catalog
Europe	24 May 2024	Lumberton Trading Company	CD	1500	LUMB036CD
