= Dry Cleaning Ray =

EP by No-Man
- Released: May 1997
- Genre: Art pop, neo-psychedelia, trip hop, space rock, dream pop
- Length: 41:59
- Label: 3rd Stone Ltd.
- Producer: Tim Bowness, Steven Wilson

No-Man chronology
| Flowermix (1995) | Dry Cleaning Ray (1997) | Radio Sessions: 1992-96 (1998) |

Professional ratings
Review scores
| Source | Rating |
|---|---|
| Allmusic | 3/5 stars |

Dry Cleaning Ray is an EP released by British art rock band No-Man. It was intended to be a companion release to Wild Opera album, compiling reinterpretations and original songs stemming from the Wild Opera sessions.

In keeping with other No-Man releases, several tracks offer other uses of Steven Wilson's previously released music; in this case, "Jack the Sax" reuses the guitar progression from "Wake as Gun" (on the Porcupine Tree release Insignificance), while "Sweetside Silver Night" uses a chord progression later reused for ".3" from Porcupine Tree's In Absentia.

== Track listing ==
All tracks are written by Bowness / Wilson, except Track 8, Serge Gainsbourg (translation: Mick Harvey).

| No. | Title | Length |
|---|---|---|
| 1. | "Dry Cleaning Ray" (remix edit) | 2.56 |
| 2. | "Sweetside Silver Night" | 4.02 |
| 3. | "Jack the Sax" | 4.17 |
| 4. | "Diet Mothers" | 4.56 |
| 5. | "Urban Disco" | 3.17 |
| 6. | "Punished for Being Born" (Muslimgauze mix of Housewives Hooked on Heroin) | 2.18 |
| 7. | "Kightlinger" | 2.44 |
| 8. | "Evelyn (Song of Slurs)" | 4.04 |
| 9. | "Sicknote" | 8.57 |

== Musicians ==
- Tim Bowness – vocals, words
- Steven Wilson – instruments
- Natalie Box – violins (4)
- Bryn Jones (Muslimgauze) – remix / reconstruction (6)
