= Anthology 1984–2004 =

Anthology 1984 - 2004

Compilation album by Vidna Obmana
- Released: 2004
- Genre: Ambient
- Label: Projekt Records

Professional ratings
Review scores
| Source | Rating |
|---|---|
| Side-Line | favorable |

Anthology 1984 - 2004 is a compilation of the first 20 years of music by Dirk Serries under his pseudonym Vidna Obmana.

== Track listing ==
| No. | Title | Origin | Length |
|---|---|---|---|
| 1. | "Shallow Faith" | previously unreleased, from ‘Legacy’ studio sessions – Belgium, 2003/2004 | 4:30 |
| 2. | "Second praise for last hope" | previously released, from ‘Untitled’ cassette, Ladd-Frith – USA, 1987 | 7:33 |
| 3. | "The Nocturnal Air" | previously unreleased, from ‘The River of Appearance’ studio sessions – Belgium, 1995/1996 | 5:43 |
| 4. | "Ecstasy" | previously released, from ‘Hope and Die’ cassette, V-tapes – Germany, 1984-1985 | 6:56 |
| 5. | "Kindred Spirits" | from ‘Crossing the Trail’ studio sessions – Belgium, previously released on ‘1654-The Cave2’ CD compilation, Hands Productions – Germany, 1998 | 5:54 |
| 6. | "Darkness Overpowers It All" | previously released, from ‘Untitled’ cassette, Ladd-Frith – USA, 1986 | 3:35 |
| 7. | "Soul Dislocation" | previously unreleased, from ‘Spore’ studio sessions – Belgium, 2001/2002 | 11:43 |
| 8. | "By Abundant Rain" | previously unreleased, from ‘The Trilogy’ studio sessions – Belgium, 1990/1993, live in concert at Diogenes, Nijmegen – The Netherlands, 1991 | 3:59 |
| 9. | "Only Fear Will Survive" | previously released from ‘Only Fear will Survive’ cassette, Ladd-Frith, USA - 1985, enhancement by Brian Ladd | 7:49 |
| 10. | "Bemused Amphibian" | from ‘Experience Artaud’ cassette, self-released – Belgium, previously released on ‘Ecstasy by Current II’ LP compilation, Schizophonia - Austria 1988 | 5:47 |
| 11. | "Assimilate" | previously unreleased, from ‘Tremor’ studio sessions – Belgium, 1999/2001 | 3:13 |
| 12. | "Arterial" | previously released, from ‘Landscape in Obscurity’ cassette, S.S.A. – The Netherlands, 1989 | 5:53 |

== Personnel ==
- Vidna Obmana – percussion, electric guitar, vocals, rhythm, electronics, atmosphere, overtone flute, fujara

== See also ==
- Vidna Obmana
- Dirk Serries
