= Jan Marmenout =

- Born: Ghent, Belgium
- Occupations: Instrumentalist, percussionist
- Instruments: berimbau kalimba balafon didgeridoo shawm Tibetan trumpet conch shells fujara lithophones shruti box
- Label: Highgate Music

Jan Marmenout (born in Ghent, Belgium) is a Belgian percussionist and multi-instrumentalist playing such instruments as the berimbau, kalimba, balafon, didgeridoo, shawm, Tibetan trumpet, conch shells, fujara, lithophones, etc. He is perhaps most-known for his compositions on the fujara, an ethnic instrument from Slovakia. Marmenout plays the fujara in an intuitive and non-traditionalist way.

He has composed the score for two movies, Desperado (2002) and Judentransport XX (2003).

== Discography ==
- Gates, Highgate Music, 1997.
- Fujara, Highgate Music, 1998.
- Spirits, Highgate Music, 1999, with Vidna Obmana.
- Wastelands, Highgate Music, 2005, with Lode Vercampt.
- A Special Blend (Fujara II), Highgate Music, 2005
