= Wild Opera =

Studio album by No-Man
- Released: 9 September 1996
- Recorded: Autumn 1994–spring 1995
- Studios: No Man's Land, Hemel Hempstead
- Genres: Trip hop, art rock
- Length: 55:09
- Labels: 3rd. Stone Ltd., Kscope
- Producers: Tim Bowness, Steven Wilson

No-Man chronology
Flowermouth (1994)	Wild Opera (1996)	Returning Jesus (2001)

Singles from Wild Opera
- 1. "Housewives Hooked on Heroin" Released: 8 April 1996

2010 Edition
- Cover of the remastered edition

Professional ratings
Review scores
Source	Rating
Allmusic	2.5/5 stars
Hot Press	(11/12)
Melody Maker	(favourable)
Music Week	4/5 stars

Wild Opera is No-Man's third studio album which displays art rock, trip hop and dub influences that were developed from improvisatory writing sessions.

== History ==
In 1996, No-Man announced their return on a new label, 3rd Stone Ltd., home of Spacemen 3 and Bark Psychosis. This was led by the Housewives Hooked on Heroin single (a Hot Press "Single of the Fortnight"), a taster for the Wild Opera album which followed that autumn.

Originally, the follow-up to Flowermouth album was meant to be the product of writing sessions that followed almost immediately after the release of said album. According to Bowness, "by the middle of 1994, we’d written around 35 minutes of material." One relevant piece that emerged from these initial sessions was the 20-minute electronic/disco Love You to Bits, which would only be completed and released 25 years later as a full-length album itself. The other was "Song About The Heart," which later evolved into "Lighthouse," released seven years later as one of the mainstays from the Returning Jesus album.

Bowness and Wilson had recently finished recording and releasing albums with their respective side projects. Firstly, Flame, a collaboration between Bowness and Richard Barbieri, a recent No-Man collaborator/guest along with his former Japan bandmates Mick Karn and Steve Jansen. Secondly, Wilson, with his newly-established Porcupine Tree lineup (which included Barbieri) had worked on the band's third album The Sky Moves Sideways.

In this line, Bowness claims there was "a need to distance ourselves from the gloss and control exhibited on those albums," and, consequently, "we decided to abandon the songs we’d been working on for the previous six months." Thus, "an abrupt about face resulted in the more spontaneous sessions that produced Wild Opera," as well as its accompanying EP/mini-album Dry Cleaning Ray.

Accordingly, most of the album had emerged from a series of semi-spontaneous improvisations recorded over a few hours rather than planned-out attempts at songwriting, as recounted by Tim Bowness. He further described the album as "‘music on the move’. I wrote the lyrics in the studio as we were completing the ‘hourlongs’, or on the back of tickets on tube journeys home from the sessions.

The raw results of such sessions appeared on the album and are exemplified by two tracks. "Libertine Libretto," for instance, was recorded on August 17, 1994, between 3 and 4 pm, while "Hit the Ceiling," a b-side from the "Housewives Hooked on Heroin" single, was recorded on September 20, 1995 between 1 and 2 pm.

"Taste My Dream" was one of the few pre-composed tracks on the album, a demo of which was originally recorded during the 1993-1994 sessions for Flame.

The title track itself is unlisted and appears as a 'hidden' bonus track.

=== Dry Cleaning Ray ===
One of the Wild Opera tracks, "Dry Cleaning Ray," was released, albeit in radio edit and remixed form, as a vinyl single in 1997. It also spawned the Dry Cleaning Ray mini-album. Dry Cleaning Ray presented reworked Wild Opera material, Gainsbourg covers, remixes (such as "Punished For Being Born", Muslimgauze's version of "Housewives Hooked on Heroin"), and instrumental moments. It also offered new songs such as "Sicknote."

== Track listing ==
All tracks are written by Tim Bowness and Steven Wilson.

No.	Title	Length
1.	"Radiant City"	3:31
2.	"Pretty Genius"	3:51
3.	"Infant Phenomenon"	3:21
4.	"Sinister Jazz"	4:48
5.	"Housewives Hooked on Heroin"	4:39
6.	"Libertine Libretto"	3:20
7.	"Taste My Dream"	6:09
8.	"Dry Cleaning Ray"	3:26
9.	"Sheeploop"	4:01
10.	"My Rival Trevor"	4:20
11.	"Time Travel in Texas"	4:24
12.	"My Revenge on Seattle"	4:42
13.	Untitled (Silence)	2:00
14.	"Wild Opera" (Hidden Track)	3:06

Sample credits

- "Pretty Genius" contains samples of "Walk On By", written by Burt Bacharach and Hal David and performed by Isaac Hayes.
- "Dry Cleaning Ray" contains samples of "Fugue in D Minor", written by Johann Sebastian Bach and performed by Egg.

=== CD1 – Wild Opera ===
Same as original release.

=== CD2 – Dry Cleaning Ray with bonus tracks ===
No.	Title	Length
1.	"Dry cleaning ray" (remix edit)	7.24
2.	"Sweetside silver night"	4.02
3.	"Jack the Sax"	4.17
4.	"Diet mothers"	4.56
5.	"Urban Disco"	3.17
6.	"Punished for Being Born" (Muslimgauze mix of Housewives Hooked on Heroin)	2.18
7.	"Kightlinger"	2.44
8.	"Evelyn (The Song of Slurs)"	4.04
9.	"Sicknote"	8.57
10.	"Hit the Ceiling" ([bonus track])	3.05
11.	"Where I'm Calling From" ([bonus track])	3.48
12.	"Housewives Hooked on Heroin" (alternate version [bonus track])	3.44
13.	"My Rival Trevor" (alternate version [bonus track])	4.37
14.	"Time Travel in Texas" (radio session [bonus track])	4.02
15.	"Pretty genius" (radio session [bonus track])	3.48

== Personnel ==
- Tim Bowness – vocals, tapes, words
- Steven Wilson – instruments, tapes, backing vocals (2, 5)

with:

- Richard Barbieri – sample material
- Natalie Box – violins (1, 2)
- Mel Collins – sample material, saxophone (1)
- Robert Fripp – sample material
