= Mixtaped =

Video by No-Man
- Released: 12 November 2009
- Recorded: "Bush Hall"; London, England, 29 August 2008
- Genre: Art rock
- Length: 90:00 (Disc 1); 85:00 (Disc 2); 42:14 (Bonus CD)
- Label: Kscope
- Directors: (Disc 1); Richard Smith (Disc 2)
- Producer

Highlights From Mixtaped
- Bonus CD for the Burning Shed initial pre-orders

Professional ratings
Review scores
Source	Rating
Allmusic	4/5 stars

Mixtaped is the first DVD release by British art rock group No-Man, consisting of a double DVD, with a live performance filmed at the London's Bush Hall on 29 August 2008, and a retrospective documentary titled Returning directed by award-winning journalist Richard Smith, amongst other features. The DVD takes its name from a song in Schoolyard Ghosts.

== Track list ==
=== Disc one ===
Disc one comprises a live performance of the band recorded at the sold-out show of the Bush Hall on 29 August 2008, one of the three first live concerts No-Man played in 15 years, plus a live photo gallery with photos from all three concerts, with an exclusive audio track of the song "Housekeeping" (recorded live in Düsseldorf).

1. Only Rain
2. Time Travel in Texas
3. All Sweet Things
4. Pretty Genius
5. All the Blue Changes
6. Truenorth
7. Wherever There is Light
8. Days in the Trees (version)
9. Lighthouse
10. Carolina Skeletons
11. Returning Jesus
12. Mixtaped
13. Things Change
14. Watching Over Me

=== Disc two ===
The second disc consists of a retrospective documentary covering the entire band career including previously unseen footage, photos and images, and interviews with No-Man different live and studio members from past and present (including Tim Bowness, Steven Wilson, Ben Coleman and Chris Maitland). This DVD also features videos for the songs "Colours", "Sweetheart Raw", "The Ballet Beast" and "Back When You Were Beautiful", a No-Man chronology and deleted scenes.

=== Highlights From Mixtaped ===
Initial pre-orders from the Burning Shed online store also received a bonus CD at no cost with some audio tracks of what are considered to be the best moments of the Bush Hall live show.

1. Only rain / Time travel in Texas (9:39)
2. All Sweet Things (6:42)
3. Pretty Genius (3:48)
4. Returning Jesus (4:49)
5. Mixtaped (8:57)
6. Things Change (8:19)

== Line-up / Musicians ==
- Tim Bowness / vocals
- Steven Wilson / guitar
- Michael Bearpark / guitar
- Pete Morgan / bass guitar
- Stephen Bennett / keyboards
- Steve Bingham / electric violin
- Andy Booker / electronic drums

and

- Ben Coleman / electric violin - on "Things Change"
