= Together We're Stranger =

Studio album by No-Man
- Released: 2 September 2003
- Recorded: 2001–2003
- Genre: Post-rock, art rock, ambient
- Length: 47:11 (CD); 53:45 (2-Disc Edition, 2014 Remaster 1-Disc Edition)
- Label: Snapper Music
- Producer: Tim Bowness, Steven Wilson

No-Man chronology
Returning Jesus (2001)	Together We're Stranger (2003)	Schoolyard Ghosts (2008)

CD/DVD-A
- Digitally Remastered CD-DVDA

Professional ratings
Review scores
Source	Rating
Allmusic	3/5 stars
Classic rock	(8/10)
Eastern Daily Press	4/4 stars
Uncut	4/5 stars

Together We're Stranger is No-Man's fifth studio album released by the Snapper Music label in 2003.

The first four songs are linked to form a 28-minute suite of continuous music with recurring lyrical and musical themes. The remaining three songs feature acoustic guitar and clarinet-dominated arrangements and are amongst the band's most stripped-down and intimate recordings. In keeping with other No-Man releases, the title track reuses the musical basis of a previous Steven Wilson work: that of "Drugged" from his first Bass Communion album. The chord progression in "The Break-Up For Real" would later be reused by Wilson for songs on Porcupine Tree's 2009 album, The Incident.

The album was released in a limited edition white vinyl format on the Dutch label Tonefloat in November 2005 and in February 2007 on Snapper Music as a two disc CD/DVD edition comprising a remastered 5.1 DVD-A surround sound mix, high resolution 24 bit stereo of the album and additional bonus material. In 2014 was released a remaster (by Steven Wilson) single-disc edition on the Kscope label, includes 2 bonus tracks "Bluecoda" and "The Break-up for Real – drum mix".

== Track listing ==
No.	Title	Length
1.	"Together We're Stranger"	8:31
2.	"All the Blue Changes"	7:48
3.	"The City in a Hundred Ways"	2:23
4.	"Things I Want to Tell You"	9:03
5.	"Photographs in Black and White"	10:03
6.	"Back When You Were Beautiful"	5:07
7.	"The Break-up for Real"	4:11
8.	"Bluecoda" (vinyl bonus track later included on the high resolution stereo and surround mixes of the two disc Snapper edition and on 2014 remaster 1-disc edition; originally placed before "Photographs in Black and White")	2:36
9.	"The Break-up for Real – drum mix" (vinyl bonus track later included on the high resolution stereo and surround mix of the two disc Snapper edition and on 2014 remaster 1-disc edition; originally replaced the other version on the single LP editions, then was included in addition to the original mix on the double LP pressing)	3:58

== Two disc Snapper edition ==
The two disc edition (on Snapper Music) comes with the original stereo mix on CD and a DVD featuring the album in 5.1 DVD-A surround sound and in high resolution 24 bit stereo, with bonus tracks "Bluecoda" and "The Break-up for Real – drum mix" as well as the video for "Things I Want to Tell You" and a photo gallery. Both "Bluecoda" and "The Break-up for Real – drum mix" later appeared on the compilation album All the Blue Changes – An Anthology 1988–2003 and on the 2014 Remaster version of the album, released by Kscope label.

== Personnel ==
- Tim Bowness – vocals, words
- Steven Wilson – instruments, harmony vocals

with:

- Michael Bearpark – guitar solo (1)
- Stephen Bennett – noise (1), organ and cymbal (6)
- Ben Castle – clarinet, bass clarinet, flute
- Peter Chilvers – space-bass (1,2), bass (6)
- Roger Eno – harmonium (5,8)
- David Picking – trumpet (1,2), electronics (1,2,3,4), percussion (2,5,9)
