= Lem =

Lem may refer to:

== Places ==
- 3836 Lem, an asteroid named after Stanisław Lem
- Lem, Denmark, a municipality in Jutland

== People ==
=== Given name or nickname ===
(Alphabetical by surname)

- Lemuel Lem Barney (born 1945), American football player
- Lem Billings (1916–1981), John F. Kennedy's friend
- Lem Burnham (born 1947), American football player
- Lem Cross (1872–1930), American Major League Baseball player
- George Lewis Lem Davis (1914–1970), American jazz saxophonist
- Lemuel Davis (born 1953), American software engineer
- Anton Lemuel Lem Dobbs (born 1959), British-American screenwriter
- Henry Honiball (born 1965), nicknamed "Lem", South African rugby player
- Lemuel Lem Johnson (1909–1989), American jazz saxophonist
- Lem T. Jones, Jr. (1924–1995), American politician
- Thomas Lemuel Lem Johns (1925–2014), American Secret Service agent present during the assassination of John F. Kennedy
- Lem Overpeck (1911–2003), American politician, Lieutenant Governor of South Dakota
- Lem Tucker (1938–1991), American journalist
- Lem Winchester (1928–1961), American jazz vibraphone player

=== Pen name ===
- Charles Antoine Lemaire (1800–1871), author typically referred to as Lem

=== Surname ===
- George Ho Lem (1918–2005), Canadian politician
- Gerard van der Lem (born 1952), Dutch footballer
- Hans Lem (1875–?), Norwegian gymnast
- Nguyễn Văn Lém (died 1968), Vietnamese communist guerrilla fighter
- Peter Mandrup Lem (1758–1828), Danish violin virtuoso
- Stanisław Lem (1921–2006), Polish science fiction writer

== Fictional entities ==
- Lem, the main character in the animated science fiction comedy film Planet 51 (2009)
- Curtis Lemansky, nicknamed Lem, a fictional character in the television series The Shield
- Lem Nikodinoski, the protagonist in Zhivko Chingo's children's book The Great Water
- The Lem, a fictional alien race in the Marvel Universe
- Lem Van Adams, a fictional character in the television series Soul Food
- Vladimir Lem, a fictional character in Max Payne 1 and 2

== Space constructions ==
- Lem (satellite), the first Polish scientific satellite, named after Polish science fiction writer Stanisław Lem
- Apollo Lunar Module, of the NASA Moon missions, better known as the Lunar Excursion Module (LEM)

== Other uses ==
- lem, ISO 639-3 code for the Mandi language of Cameroon

== See also ==
- LEM (disambiguation)
- IEM (disambiguation)
- 1Em
