= Bass Communion V Muslimgauze =

Remix album by Muslimgauze, Bass Communion
- Released: September 24, 1999
- Recorded: 1996–1997; 1999
- Genre: Dark ambient
- Label: Soleilmoon
- Producer: Muslimgauze, Bass Communion

Muslimgauze, Bass Communion chronology
| Bass Communion V Muslimgauze (1999) | Bass Communion V Muslimgauze EP (2000) |

Professional ratings
Review scores
| Source | Rating |
|---|---|
| Allmusic | link |

Bass Communion V Muslimgauze is a CD of remixes of Muslimgauze material by Bass Communion. Additional remix material was released on Bass Communion V Muslimgauze EP.

This material was written, played and recorded in 1996–97. The final mix and edit was in 1999.

The initial pressing was limited to 600 copies. The album received its second pressing in August 2000.

== Track listing ==
1. "One" - 8:36
2. "Two" - 7:16
3. "Three" - 13:04
4. "Four" - 4:58
5. "Five" - 10:38
