= Schoolyard Ghosts =

Studio album by No-Man
- Released: 12 May 2008
- Recorded: August–September 2007, January–March 2008
- Genre: Post-rock, art rock
- Length: 53:00
- Label: Kscope
- Producer: Tim Bowness, Steven Wilson

No-Man chronology
Together We're Stranger (2003)	Schoolyard Ghosts (2008)	Love You to Bits (2019)

Schoolyard Ghosts is the sixth studio album by British art rock band No-Man.

Recorded in the UK, France, Sweden and the USA and released on 12 May 2008, the album features contributions from Bruce Kaphan (American Music Club, Red House Painters), drummers Pat Mastelotto (King Crimson) and Gavin Harrison (Porcupine Tree, King Crimson), saxophonist/flautist Theo Travis, and the London Session Orchestra arranged by Dave Stewart (Hatfield and the North, Egg, Stewart and Gaskin etc.). In his online diary Tim Bowness mentions that, despite following a difficult year and being typically melancholy in places, the tone of the album is more optimistic than anything the band have done before. He also says "All Sweet Things" and "Truenorth" are perhaps the pinnacle of the band's achievements. A promotional Schoolyard Ghosts microsite was created by the band's label, K-Scope. It first featured a music video for "Truenorth – Part Two" which was thereafter replaced for a video of the song "Wherever There Is Light". No-Man fan site "A Confession" has also created a dedicated Schoolyard Ghosts microsite featuring the video for "Truenorth – Part Two" and album lyrics. The No-Man MySpace page also includes extracts from the album.

== Reception ==
Professional ratings
Review scores
Source	Rating
Allmusic	4/5 stars
Blogcritics	(positive)
Classic rock	(9/10)
Goldmine	5/5 stars
Rock Sound	(7/10)

Reviews for the album have generally been very favourable, with positive reviews and interviews featured in Classic Rock (UK), Rock Sound (UK), Goldmine (USA), Record Collector (UK), Eclipsed (Germany), Metal Hammer (Germany), Metal Hammer (Poland), Free! (Finland), Rolling Stone (Mexico), Jam (Italy), and Allmusic.

In June 2008, the album was No. 1 in Prog Archives' Member's Albums of the Year chart and No. 474 in Rate Your Music's reader's albums of 2008. In October 2008, the album was No. 5 in the Eclipsed magazine's reader's charts. In January 2009, the album was rated No. 23 in the Eclipsed critic's end of year lists.

== Formats ==
The album is available in a CD/DVD-A audiophile edition and comes in a digipack format with booklet and also features a 5.1 mix of the album, a photo gallery and videos for 3 songs. The first 2000 copies of the album obtained from the No-Man online store came with an exclusive 6 track, 20-minute, bonus disc of alternates and edits. It sold out within 2 weeks of the pre-release announcement. A second print of the album was issued in August 2014, replacing the DVD-A with a second CD of bonus material.

== Promotion ==
To promote the album, the band played its first performances for fifteen years in London, Düsseldorf and Zoetermeer. The London Bush Hall performance was recorded for the first No-Man's DVD, Mixtaped.

== Track listing ==
All lyrics are written by Bowness.

No.	Title	Music	Length
1.	"All Sweet Things"	No-Man	6:47
2.	"Beautiful Songs You Should Know"	Bowness, Giancarlo Erra	4:26
3.	"Pigeon Drummer"	No-Man	6:18
4.	"Truenorth"	No-Man	12:48
5.	"Wherever There is Light"	No-Man	4:21
6.	"Song of the Surf"	No-Man, Alistair Murphy	6:12
7.	"Streaming"	No-Man	3:32
8.	"Mixtaped"	No-Man	8:36
Total length:			53:00

"Beautiful Songs You Should Know" was written by Bowness with Giancarlo Erra of the Italian band Nosound and the two recorded an alternative version of the song for the album called "Warm Winter" which they released under the moniker Memories of Machines. The song "Mixtaped" is a reworked version of a Tim Bowness solo demo called "Schoolyard Ghosts". A proper recording of this version was later also included on "Warm Winter".

=== Bonus material ===
The original No-Man Store edition featured an exclusive 20-minute bonus disc of alternates and edits.

All lyrics are written by Bowness.

No.	Title	Music	Length
1.	"Truenorth Part 1 – strings"	No-Man	1:50
2.	"Truenorth Part 2 – alternate"	No-Man	3:51
3.	"Beautiful Songs You Should Know – alternate"	Bowness, Erra	4:06
4.	"Pigeon Beater"	No-Man	3:04
5.	"Song of the Surf – alternate"	No-Man, Murphy	3:49
6.	"Truenorth Part 2 – video edit"	No-Man	4:19

=== 2014 Reissue bonus disc ===
A reissue will be printed in August 2014 which replaces the DVD-A with a second CD of bonus material. It collects most of the bonus disc listed above along with Bowness' home demos and bonus tracks from the "Wherever There is Light" single.

No.	Title	Length
1.	"Another Winter (Demo)"	2:33
2.	"The City Sounds (Demo)"	2:44
3.	"Ominous Dancefloor (Demo)"	4:15
4.	"The Place Where You'd Hide (Demo)"	4:15
5.	"Truenorth Part 1 – strings"	1:50
6.	"Truenorth Part 2 – alternate"	3:37
7.	"Beautiful Songs You Should Know – alternate"	4:06
8.	"Pigeon Beater"	3:03
9.	"Lucky You Lucky Me"	4:51
10.	"Song of the Surf – alternate"	3:48
11.	"Counting"	4:24
12.	"Death Was California"	3:04

== Personnel ==
=== No-Man ===
- Tim Bowness – vocals, musical box, mellotron, piano, chime guitars, vocal loops.
- Steven Wilson – piano, acoustic and electric guitars, bass, keyboards, glockenspiel, harmony vocals, musical box, electric piano, organ, harp, harmonium, percussion, drum programming.

==== Additional personnel ====
- Theo Travis – flute, soprano sax (tracks 4, 5 and 8).
- Peter Chilvers – samples from 'surfacing' (track 1).
- Colin Edwin – fretless acoustic bass (track 2)
- Rick Edwards – percussion (track 2)
- Marianne De Chastelaine – cello (track 2)
- Pat Mastelotto – drums, percussion (tracks 3 and 6)
- Fabrice Lefebvre – yang t'chin (track 4)
- Andrew Booker (credited as 'Andy Booker') – electronic percussion (track 4), drum loop (track 7)
- Bruce Kaphan – pedal steel guitar (tracks 5 and 7)
- Pete Morgan – bass (track 7)
- Gavin Harrison – drums (track 8)
- Strings arranged by Dave Stewart and performed by the London Session Orchestra.
