= Bass Communion III =

III

Studio album by Bass Communion
- Released: CD: March 2001; CD Reissue (with II): 2008
- Recorded: 1995–1999
- Genre: Ambient, drone
- Length: 63:37
- Label: Burning Shed; Reissue: Beta-Lactam Ring
- Producer: Steven Wilson

Bass Communion chronology
II (1999)	III (2001)	Ghosts on Magnetic Tape (2004)

Professional ratings
Review scores
Source	Rating
Allmusic	2.5/5 stars

III (Bass Communion III or Bass Communion CDR) is the name of the third studio album released by British musician, songwriter, and producer Steven Wilson under the pseudonym Bass Communion. It is a compilation of leftover pieces recorded between 1995 and 1999 that were not included on either of the previous two Bass Communion albums. In 2008, the album was re-issued together with II in a 2-CD edition limited to 1,200 copies.

== Track listing ==
All tracks are written by Steven Wilson

No.	Title	Length
1.	"Amphead"	13:14
2.	"Three Pieces for Television" a - "Sonar" b - "Lina Romay" c - "Grammatic Fog"	2:15; 2:40; 2:08
5.	"Slut 2.1"	9:54
6.	"43553E99.01"	14:06
7.	"Sickness"	11:12
8.	"Reformat Spiders"	7:50

== Track notes ==
The track "43553E99.01" features the same intro as "Lips of Ashes" from In Absentia by Porcupine Tree, among other tonal similarities. It is often seen as a precursor or demo, and serves as an example of Steven Wilson revisiting and expanding upon similar ideas across projects.

Three Pieces for Television: appeared previously on Atmospherics

- "Sonar" appears as "Sonar"
- "Lina Romay" appears as "Night Creatures"
- "Grammatic Fog" appears as "The Fog"

== Personnel ==
- Steven Wilson – All instruments
- Theo Travis – Saxophone on "Reformat Spiders"

=== Other ===
- Carl Glover – Photography
- Aleph – Graphic design

== Release history ==
Region	Date	Label	Format	Catalog
United Kingdom	March 2001	Burning Shed	mail order only CD-R	
United Kingdom	November 2008	Beta-Lactam Ring	Double CD reissue(with II)	mt182
