= Vidna Obmana =

Belgian composer and ambient musician

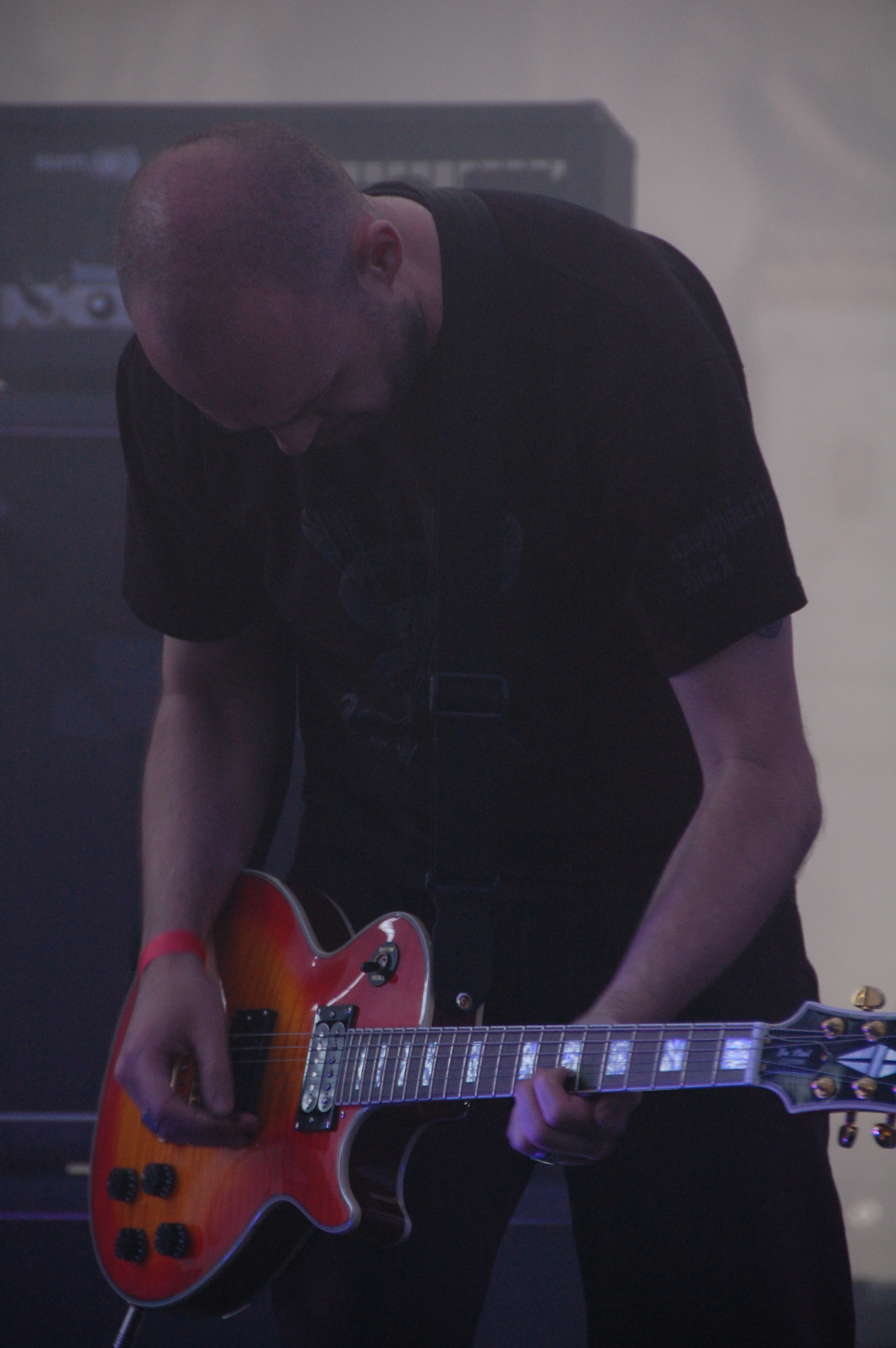
- Dirk Serries (2009)

Background information
- Born: Dirk Serries; 1968 (age 57–58)
- Origin: Belgium
- Genres: Ambient music Minimal music Drone music
- Years active: 1984–2007
- Labels: ND Records; Hypnos Recordings; Soleilmoon Recordings; Projekt Records

Vidna Obmana (stylized vidnaObmana on many album covers) is a pseudonym used by Belgian composer and ambient musician Dirk Serries. The name Vidna Obmana, a phrase in Serbian, literally translates to "optical illusion" and was chosen by Serries because he felt it accurately described the music. Serries created music under the Vidna Obmana pseudonym from 1984 until 2007, when he officially retired the name. Most of his current work is released under the Fear Falls Burning pseudonym.

Vidna Obmana's music has often been described as anamorphic and organic. He uses the techniques of looping and shaping harmonies, minimizing the configurations to a few notes.

Vidna Obmana has collaborated on several occasions with artists such as Asmus Tietchens, Brannan Lane, Capriolo Trifoglio, Diego Borotti, and Steve Roach. Some of these collaborations have become entire projects of their own, such as Continuum (collaboration with Bass Communion) and Principle of Silence (collaboration with Joris De Backer).

Vidna Obmana is often cited as one of the more notable dark ambient musicians.

== Discography ==
=== Solo albums ===
- The Ultimated Sign of Burning Death (1985) Therapie Organisatie
- Experience Artaud - Soundtrack for Experimental Theatre (1988), Mechanical Orchestration Music
- Deathchamber - Trancedreamed (1988) Mechanical Orchestration Music
- Gathering in frozen beauty (1989), The Decade Collection
- Near the flogging landscape (1990), VioletGlassOracle Tapes
- Refined on gentle clouds (1991), Direct Music
- Passage in Beauty (1991), Projekt
- Shadowing in Sorrow (1991), Projekt
- Ending Mirage (1992), Projekt
- Echoing Delight (1993)
- Revealed by composed nature (1994), Hic Sunt Leones
- The Spiritual Bonding (1994) Extreme
- The Transcending Quest (1995), Amplexus
- The River of Appearance (1996), Projekt
- Twilight of Perception (1997), Projekt
- Crossing the Trail (1997), Projekt
- Landscape in obscurity (1998), Hypnos - with Capriolo Trifoglio and Diego Borotti
- The Surreal Sanctuary (2000), Hypnos
- The Contemporary Nocturne (2000), Hypnos
- Subterranean Collective (2001), Project
- Soundtrack for the Aquarium (2001), Hypnos
- Tremor (2001), Relapse/Release
- Isolation Trip/Path of Distortion (2002), Klanggalerie (7" LP)
- Spore (2003), Relapse
- Legacy (2004), Relapse

=== Opera for Four Fusion Works Series ===
- An Opera for Four Fusion Works
  - Act One: Echoes of Steel with Dreams in Exile (2002), Hypnos
  - Act Two: Phrasing the Air with Bill Fox (2004), Hypnos
  - Act Three: Reflection on Scale with Kenneth Kirchner (2006), Hypnos
  - Act 4 (2007), Hypnos

=== Collaborations ===
==== With Bass Communion ====
- Continuum I (2005), Soleilmoon
- the continuum recyclings, volume one (2006), Tonefloat (2LP)
- Continuum II (2007), Soleilmoon
- the continuum recyclings, volume two (2010), Tonefloat (2LP)

==== With Big City Orchestra ====
- Vidna Obmana & Big City Orchestra (1989), Mechanical Orchestration Music

==== With Serge Devadder ====
- The Shape of Solitude (1999), Multimood

==== With Alio Die ====
- Echo Passage (1999), Musica Maxima Magnetica; Projekt Records (USA)

==== With Brannan Lane ====
- Deep Unknown (2002), Ambient Circle

==== With Dreams in Exile ====
- 2-disc re-release of The River of Appearance (1996) with accompanying all-acoustic re-conceptualization of the album by Dreams in Exile

==== With Klinik ====
- Gluttony (2005), Hands
- Greed (2006), Hands

==== With Jan Marmenout ====
- Spirits (1999), High Gate Music

==== With David Lee Myers ====
- Tracers (2003), Klanggalerie

==== With Neurotic Youth ====
- Bleeding Wounds / Only Fear Will Survive (1986), Ladd-Frith

==== With PBK ====
- Monument of Empty Colours (1988), The Decade Collection
- Compositions : Depression & Ideal (1989), Freedom in a Vacuum/PBK Recordings
- Fragment 3 (1991), N D

==== With Jeff Pearce ====
- True Stories (1999), Mirage

==== With Steve Roach ====
- Well of Souls (1995), Projekt – 2 discs
- Cavern of Sirens (1997), Projekt
- Ascension of Shadows (1998), Projekt (limited edition 3-disc set included Somewhere Else, re-released 2005)
- Live Archive (2000), Groove Unlimited
- Circles & Artifacts (2000), Contemptary Harmonic
- InnerZone (2002), Projekt
- Spirit Dome (2004), Projekt
- Somewhere Else (2005), Projekt
- Low Volume Music (2012), Projekt

==== With Sam Rosenthal ====
- Terrace of Memories (1992), Projekt

==== With Djen Ajakan Shean ====
- Parallel Flaming (1994), Multimood
- Still Fragments (1994), ND

==== With Willem Tanke ====
- Variations for Organ, Keyboard and Processors (1999), Multimood

==== With Asmus Tietchens ====
- The Shift Recyclings (2002), Soleilmoon
- Motives for Recycling (Linear Writings, Nachtstücke Revisited) (1999), Soleilmoon
- Untitled Collaboration (1995), Syrenia

==== Other collaborations ====
- Zero Point (2001), The Foundry - by Seofon with Thermal, Stephen Kent, Robert Rich, Steve Roach, Not Breathing
- Music for Exhibiting Water with Contents – Soundtrack for the Aquarium (1992) Antwerp ZOO - Split with Hybrids
- A Thunder Orchestra / Vidna Obmana (1986), Ladd-Frith - Split release with A Thunder Orchestra
- Agoraphobic Nosebleed - PCP Torpedo ANbRx "Three Ring Inferno" - remix

=== Anthologies ===
- Noise/Drone Anthology 1984-1989 (2005), Ikon/Projekt
- Anthology 1984 - 2004 (2004), Ikon/Projekt
- Memories Compiled 2 (Near the flogging landscape, Refined on gentle clouds) (1999), Projekt: Archive
- The Trilogy (1995), Projekt: Archive - Compilation of Passage in beauty, Shadowing in sorrow and Ending Mirage
- Memories Compiled 1 (Monument of Empty Colours, Gathering in frozen beauty) (1994), Projekt: Archive - with PBK

== See also ==
- List of ambient music artists
