= Indicates Void =

Studio album by Bass Communion
- Released: October 2005
- Recorded: 1998 (track 4) & 2005
- Genres: Ambient; drone
- Length: 38:00
- Labels: Tonefloat; Coup Sur Coup
- Producer: Steven Wilson

Bass Communion chronology
Ghosts on Magnetic Tape (2004)	Indicates Void (2005)	Loss (2006)

Indicates Void is the fifth studio album released by British musician, songwriter and producer Steven Wilson under the pseudonym Bass Communion, and was limited to 300 12-inch LP copies in handmade sleeves, 100 copies in a silver sleeve, 100 copies in a gold sleeve, and 100 copies as part of a box set of the first 3 "C" releases. The album was re-released on compact cassette in 2020 by Coup Sur Coup Records.

The album consists of Steven Wilson's 2005 recordings based primarily on one instrument source each, except for track 4 which was recorded with Theo Travis in 1998.

== Track listing ==
All music is composed by Steven Wilson.

No.	Title	Length
1.	"Guitar"	10:40
2.	"Clarinet"	8:21
3.	"Voice/Musical Box"	11:16
4.	"Piano/Soprano Sax"	9:18

2020 reissue bonus tracks
No.	Title	Length
5.	"Guitar Study" (Indicates Void I Prototype)	23:00
6.	"Indicates Void II" (Long Version)	11:32
