= Speak (No-Man album) =

Compilation album by No-Man
- Released: April 1993 (Cassette); August 1999 (CD re-release)
- Recorded: 1988–1989, 1999 (Tracks 4 & 10)
- Studio: No-Man's Land, Hemel Hempstead
- Genre: Ambient, Art rock
- Length: 43:06 (1993 cassette); 39:12 (1999 reissue); 50:54 (2005 reissue)
- Label: Hidden Art, Materiali Sonori, Snapper Music
- Producer: Tim Bowness, Steven Wilson

No-Man chronology
Radio Sessions: 1992-96 (1998)	Speak (1993)	Lost Songs Vol 1 (2001)

Professional ratings
Review scores
Source	Rating
AllMusic	3/5 stars

Speak (stylized as ((speak))) is a compilation album consisting of previously obscure material by British art rock band No-Man.

Originally, the song were recorded between 1988 and 1989, and self-released on compact cassette in 1993. The songs were later re-mixed, re-sung and re-released in 1999 (during the band's sessions for Returning Jesus). The new version features a different tracklist in comparison to the original. "Forest Almost Burning" and "Desert Heart" (which later was reworked into "Close Your Eyes" on Returning Jesus) were omitted and cover songs by Nick Drake and Donovan recorded during the same sessions were added.

Snapper Music's 2005 reissue of Speak adds the bonus track "The Hidden Art of Man Ray" (an untreated improvisation from 1988). The track also appears as a second disc on the limited edition of Tonefloat's vinyl release of Speak. All tracks (except 4 and 10, which are newer versions recorded in 1999) were cleaned up from original tapes, remixed and new vocal takes recorded.

According to the band's official website, the record remains as "a favourite of both Bowness and Wilson"

== Track listing ==
=== 1993 cassette ===
All tracks are written by Tim Bowness and Steven Wilson, except where noted

Side one
No.	Title	Writer(s)	Length
1.	"Speak"	Wilson, Ben Coleman	1:22
2.	"Night Sky, Sweet Earth"		6:00
3.	"Iris Murdoch Cut Me Up"		4:27
4.	"Riverrun"		3:44
5.	"French Tree Terror Suspect"	Wilson, Coleman	3:07
6.	"Life with Picasso"	Bowness	3:24
Total length:			22:06

Side two
No.	Title	Writer(s)	Length
1.	"Curtain Dream"		3:13
2.	"Forest Almost Burning"	Wilson, Bowness, Brian Hulse, Michael Bearpark, David K. Jones	4:01
3.	"The Ballet Beast"		1:23
4.	"Heaven's Break"		2:31
5.	"Desert Heart"		7:15
6.	"Death and Dodgeson's Dreamchild"		2:37
Total length:			21:00 (43:06)

=== 1999 reissue ===
All tracks are written by Tim Bowness and Steven Wilson, except where noted

No.	Title	Writer(s)	Length
1.	"Speak"	Ben Coleman, Wilson	1:24
2.	"Pink Moon"	Nick Drake	3:03
3.	"Iris Murdoch Cut Me Down"		4:33
4.	"Curtain Dream (1999 newly recorded version)"		3:01
5.	"Heaven's Break"		3:22
6.	"French Tree Terror Suspect"	Coleman, Wilson	2:59
7.	"River Song"	Donovan Leitch	2:01
8.	"Riverrun"		4:44
9.	"The Ballet Beast"		1:27
10.	"Night Sky Sweet Earth (1999 newly recorded version)"		6:37
11.	"Life With Picasso"	Bowness	3:26
12.	"Death and Dodgson's Dreamchild"		2:19
Total length:			39:12

Bonus track on 2005 reissue
No.	Title	Length
13.	"The Hidden Art of Man Ray"	11:42
Total length:		50:54

== Musicians ==
- Tim Bowness – vocals, words, guitar (11)
- Steven Wilson – instruments, backing vocals (8,10)
- Stuart Blagden – guitar (13)
- Ben Coleman – violin (1,6,10,13)
- Richard Felix – cello (6,9), harmonica (5)
- Brian Hulse – electric guitar (8, 1993 cassette only)
