= Bass Communion II =

II

Studio album by Bass Communion
- Released: July 1999
- Recorded: 1998 at No-Man's Land, Hemel Hempstead
- Genre: Ambient, drone
- Length: 59:23 (CD 1); 23:23 (CD 2); 1:22:46 (Total); 1:11:34 (Re-issue); 1:41:39 (Vinyl)
- Label: Hidden Art
- Producer: Steven Wilson

Bass Communion chronology
I (1998)	II (1999)	III (2001)

Professional ratings
Review scores
Source	Rating
Allmusic	3/5 stars

Bass Communion II is the second studio album released in 1999 by British musician, songwriter, and producer Steven Wilson under the pseudonym Bass Communion. The first edition was a double album with a second disc containing a track of sampled material provided by Robert Fripp and a remix by The Square Root of Sub. The 2002 reissue of the album excludes the remix by The Square Root of Sub and moves the Fripp-based track to the first disc, taking the album to a single CD. The album was later released on vinyl in December 2007 by Tonefloat Records and includes exclusive bonus material on Side D. In November 2008, the album was re-issued together with III in a 2CD edition limited to 1,200 copies.

== Track listing ==
=== Original release ===
All tracks are written by Steven Wilson, except where indicated.

Disc 1
No.	Title	Writer(s)	Length
1.	"Advert"		0:56
2.	"16 Second Swarm"		10:58
3.	"Grammatic Oil"		10:11
4.	"Drugged 3"		17:00
5.	"Dwarf Artillery"		7:14
6.	"Wide Open Killingfeld"	Steven Wilson/Theo Travis	13:01

Disc 2
No.	Title	Writer(s)	Length
1.	"A Grapefruit in the World of Park" (Based on Robert Fripp soundscape)		12:10
2.	"Snakebird" (The Square Root of Sub Remix)	Steven Wilson/Mark Poysden	11:12

=== 2002 and 2009 editions ===
All tracks are written by Steven Wilson, except where indicated.

No.	Title	Writer(s)	Length
1.	"Advert"		0:56
2.	"16 Second Swarm"		10:58
3.	"Grammatic Oil"		10:11
4.	"Drugged 3"		17:00
5.	"Dwarf Artillery"		7:14
6.	"Wide Open Killingfeld"	Steven Wilson/Theo Travis	13:01
7.	"A Grapefruit in the World of Park" (Based on Robert Fripp soundscape)		12:02

=== Vinyl edition ===
All tracks are written by Steven Wilson, except where indicated.

Side A
No.	Title	Length
1.	"Advert"	0:56
2.	"16 Second Swarm"	10:58
3.	"Grammatic Oil"	10:11

Side B
No.	Title	Length
1.	"Drugged 3"	17:00

Side C
No.	Title	Writer(s)	Length
1.	"Dwarf Artillery"		7:14
2.	"Wide Open Killingfeld part 1"	Steven Wilson/Theo Travis	12:57

Side D
No.	Title	Writer(s)	Length
1.	"Wide Open Killingfeld part 2"	Steven Wilson/Theo Travis	5:52
2.	"Wide Open Killingfeld part 3"	Steven Wilson/Theo Travis	13:04

== Personnel ==
- Steven Wilson – All instruments
- Theo Travis – Flute, saxophone

=== Other ===
- Carl Glover – Graphic design and photography

== Release history ==
Region	Date	Label	Format	Catalog
United Kingdom	July 1999	Hidden Art	Double CD	HI-ART 4
United Kingdom	2002	Headphone Dust	CD reissue	BCCD3
United Kingdom	December 2007	Tonefloat	Double LP	TF42
United Kingdom	November 2008	Beta-Lactam Ring	Double CD reissue (with III)	mt182
Netherlands	January 2020	Tonefloat	Double LP reissue (clear vinyl)	TF042
