= An Escalator to Christmas =

EP by Incredible Expanding Mindfuck
- Released: April 1999
- Recorded: 1999
- Genre: Psychedelic rock
- Length: 16:44; 38:25 (complete)
- Label: ToneFloat
- Producer: Steven Wilson

Incredible Expanding Mindfuck chronology
I.E.M. (1996)	An Escalator to Christmas (1999)	Arcadia Son (2001)

An Escalator to Christmas is an EP by Steven Wilson's side project, the Incredible Expanding Mindfuck. It was released on vinyl only as a limited edition of 500 copies in 5 different colours: yellow, blue, green, red, and black.

Side A ("An Escalator to Christmas") saw its CD debut on the 2005 album I.E.M. 1996-1999 while the B-side "Headphone Dust" is included as an extra track on the CD version of the 1996 I.E.M. album. An expanded version was also included on the 2010 Complete I.E.M. box set.

== Track listing ==
All tracks written by Steven Wilson.

Side A

1. "Telegraph" – 0:13
2. "Extract From '4 Ways'" – 0:03
3. "B.C." - 0:34
4. "Sign Language" - 3:04
5. "Space Cadet" - 0:25
6. "Any Note You Want" – 0:31
7. "An Escalator to Xmas" – 3:22
8. "Mind" - 0:05
9. "In Place of a Requiem" - 2:07
10. "Telegraph" - 0:08

Side B

1. "Headphone Dust" - 6:11

Complete I.E.M. version

1. "An Escalator to Christmas" - 10:33
2. "Headphone Dust" - 6:11
3. "Interview" - 0:27
4. "An Escalator to Christmas" (Extended) - 13:04
5. "I.E.M. Have Come For Your Children" - 8:11
