= Continuum (music project) =

Ambient and drone music project

Continuum is a collaborative ambient and drone music project between Bass Communion (Steven Wilson of Porcupine Tree) and Dirk Serries (of Vidna Obmana and Fear Falls Burning). The project looks to expand on the artists' "collective ambition and vision, motivated by their immense passion for a wide-range of musical styles, ranging from spacious ambience to pounding doom metal."

== Discography ==
=== Studio albums ===
- Continuum I (2005)
- Continuum II (2007)

=== Remix albums ===
- The Continuum Recyclings, Volume One (2006)
- Continuum Recyclings Volume Two (2010)
