= Flowermouth =

Studio album by No-Man
- Released: 27 June 1994
- Recorded: September–December 1993
- Studio: No Man's Land, Hemel Hempstead
- Genre: Trip hop Dream pop Art rock
- Length: 57:26
- Label: One Little Indian
- Producer: Tim Bowness, Steven Wilson

No-Man chronology
Loveblows & Lovecries – A Confession (1993)	Flowermouth (1994)	Wild Opera (1996)

Professional ratings
Review scores
Source	Rating
AllMusic	4/5 stars
Brum Beat	3/5 stars
Melody Maker	(favourable)
NME	3/10 stars

Flowermouth is the second studio album by British duo No-Man, released in 1994 on the One Little Indian Records label, and subsequently reissued in September 1999 by 3rd. Stone Ltd, and in a deluxe format by Snapper Music in February 2005.

== History ==
Flowermouth was considered the band's most ambitious album to date, and remains a fan favourite. Despite being the band's best selling release, it was obvious by now that No-Man couldn't continue along the path which their record company wanted them to follow. Following Flowermouth's release, No-Man parted company with both One Little Indian in Britain and Epic/Sony in the US.

Long-term band member Ben Coleman left prior to the album's release and by 1994, the band had effectively retired from live performance.

Considered a vitally important evolution, the album realized the expansive promise of the band's earlier material. Combining dream pop, art rock and moody minimalism, with an epic orchestral scope, Flowermouth was well served by the guest performances of Japan/Rain Tree Crow's Jansen and Barbieri, King Crimson's Robert Fripp and Mel Collins, jazz trumpeter Ian Carr and Dead Can Dance singer Lisa Gerrard.

The original One Little Indian version of Flowermouth features several slightly different mixes to the ones featured on the later reissues.

For the second reissue, Steven Wilson delivered a definitive remaster and the band have added two bonus tracks to the running order ("Angeldust" and "Born Simple", both originally from the now-deleted "Flowermix" album and featuring extensive soundscape contributions from Robert Fripp). The reissue also features improved digi-pack artwork and new sleevenotes containing a combined band interview/essay by music journalist Dann Chinn.

Portions of the recording sessions ran parallel to those of the Barbieri & Bowness' Flame project (released two months later, also on One Little Indian). Wire Magazine, in conjunction with the label, distributed a four-track sampler CD with their July 1994 issue which included two tracks from each release.

The strings from the end of "Watching Over Me" were later sampled for the song "Only Rain" on Returning Jesus in 2001.

A music video was made for the song "You Grow More Beautiful."

== Track listing ==
1. "Angel Gets Caught in the Beauty Trap" – 9:56
2. "You Grow More Beautiful" – 5:37
3. "Animal Ghost" – 6:09
4. "Soft Shoulders" – 3:57
5. "Shell of a Fighter" – 7:48
6. "Teardrop Fall" – 4:37
7. "Watching Over Me" – 4:48
8. "Simple" – 7:03
9. "Things Change" – 7:31

=== 2005 bonus tracks ===
1. "Angeldust" – 9:11
2. "Born Simple" – 12:09

== Personnel ==
- Tim Bowness – vocals, words
- Steven Wilson – instruments

with:

- Richard Barbieri – electronics (5)
- Ian Carr – trumpet (1)
- Ben Coleman – violins (1, 3, 4, 5, 6, 7), electric violin (9)
- Mel Collins – soprano saxophone (1), flute (3, 6)
- Robert Fripp – guitar (1, 3, 5, 6, 8), frippertronics (1, 5, 8, 9)
- Lisa Gerrard – voice sample (8)
- Steve Jansen – percussion (7)
- Chris Maitland – drums (1, 9), percussion (1, 3)
- Silas Maitland – fretless bass (1)

== Release history ==
Region	Date	Label	Format	Catalog
United Kingdom	June 1994	One Little Indian	CD	TPLP67CD
United Kingdom	June 1994	One Little Indian	Vinyl	TPLP67
United Kingdom	June 1994	One Little Indian	Cassette	TPLP67MC
Japan	1994	One Little Indian	CD	COCY-78166
United Kingdom	September 1999	3rd Stone Ltd.	CD Remastered Edition	STONE 045CD
United Kingdom	July 2003	Hidden Art	CD Reissue	HI-ART 17
United Kingdom	October 2005	Snapper Music	CD Remaster	SDPCD195
