= Lovesighs – An Entertainment =

EP by No-Man
- Released: April 1992
- Recorded: 1990–1991
- Genre: Trip hop, dream pop
- Length: 35:19
- Label: One Little Indian
- Producer: Steven Wilson

No-Man chronology
Lovesighs – An Entertainment (1992)	Loveblows & Lovecries – A Confession (1993)

Professional ratings
Review scores
Source	Rating
AllMusic	3/5 stars

Lovesighs – An Entertainment is an EP released by No-Man in 1992 on the One Little Indian label. It comprised the band's singles and B-sides from 1990 and 1991.

An ambitious and diverse collection of sensual songs and innovative instrumentals, the album combined influences from dub, dream pop, classical and hip-hop music.

Both "Colours" and "Days in the Trees" were singles of the week in Melody Maker and Sounds and on Channel Four's teletext.

"Lovesighs" was trailed by a further single, "Ocean Song".

"Days in the Trees" shares its main melody with the Porcupine Tree track "Mute" (from 1994's Yellow Hedgerow Dreamscape).

== Track listing ==
All songs written by Steven Wilson and Tim Bowness except as noted.

1. "Heartcheat Pop" – 3:52
2. "Days in the Trees (Mahler)" (Wilson, Bowness, G. Fenton)– 6:21
3. "Drink Judas" – 3:44
4. "Heartcheat Motel" – 4:38
5. "Kiss Me Stupid" – 4:42
6. "Colours" (Donovan) – 4:10
7. "Iris Murdoch Cut Me Up" – 5:19
8. "Days in the Trees (Reich)" (Wilson) – 2:35

Bonus tracks on Housekeeping: The OLI Years box set edition.

9. Days in the Trees (Ives) - 3:16
10. Days in the Trees (Bartok) - 6:26
11. Walker - 3:24
12. Road - 3:15 (Nick Drake)

== Personnel ==
- Tim Bowness – vocals, words
- Ben Coleman – violin
- Steven Wilson – instruments

with:

- Patricia Leavitt – sampled voice (1)
- Lara Flynn Boyle – sampled voice (8)
