= Molotov and Haze =

- Cover design by Carl Glover.

Studio album by Bass Communion
- Released: 22 July 2008
- Recorded: 14–17 February 2008
- Genre: Ambient, drone, noise
- Length: 64:18 (CD); 72:31 (LP)
- Label: Important Records
- Producer: Steven Wilson

Bass Communion chronology
Pacific Codex (2008)	Molotov and Haze (2008)	Chiaroscuro (2009)

Professional ratings
Review scores
Source	Rating
AllMusic	3.5/5 stars

Molotov and Haze is the eighth studio album released by British musician, songwriter and producer Steven Wilson under the pseudonym Bass Communion.

The album consists of four tracks, and, according to Steven Wilson's website, is divided into two sections: "2 noisy tracks (Molotov) and 2 transcendently beautiful tracks (Haze)." All pieces were generated from guitar and recorded from 14 to 17 February 2008.

The album was issued in miniature card gatefold sleeve. Some excerpts from "Haze" and "Corrosive" can be heard on the Bass Communion Myspace page. An excerpt from "Molotov" can be heard through the Important Records website.

== Vinyl edition ==
In April 2009, Molotov and Haze was released in a double LP vinyl edition by Tonefloat Records with extended versions of "Molotov 1502" and "Haze 1402". The edition was limited to 500 copies on 180 grams black vinyl in gatefold picture sleeve, and contained a 10" LP of Haze Shrapnel as a bonus disc.

== Track listing ==
No.	Title	Length
1.	"Molotov 1502"	CD:15:30 LP:20:41
2.	"Glacial 1602"	13:10
3.	"Corrosive 1702"	12:26
4.	"Haze 1402"	CD:23:10 LP:26:12

== Personnel ==
- Steven Wilson – guitars
- Carl Clover (for Aleph) – cover design

== Release history ==
Region	Date	Label	Format	Catalog
United States	22 July 2008	Important Records	CD	imprec193
Netherlands	April 2009	Tonefloat	Double LP	TF67
