= Chiaroscuro (Bass Communion album) =

Live album by Bass Communion
- Released: July 2009
- Genre: Ambient, drone
- Length: 45:50
- Label: Headphone Dust
- Producer: Steven Wilson

Bass Communion chronology
Molotov and Haze (2008)	Chiaroscuro (2009)	Cenotaph (2011)

Chiaroscuro is a live album by British musician, songwriter and producer Steven Wilson under the pseudonym Bass Communion. The title track was recorded live in Antwerp in November 2008. The second track, Fusilier also appears on the Bass Communion / Fear Falls Burning split 7" LP given away to attendees of the concert.

== Track listing ==
No.	Title	Length
1.	"Chiaroscuro"	37:55
2.	"Fusilier"	7:55

== Personnel ==
- Steven Wilson – Guitar, Laptop, Microphone
- Carl Glover – Photography, Cover Design
