= Lymphocyte expansion molecule =

Lymphocyte expansion molecule (LEXM) was considered to be a protein discovered in 2015, allegedly involved in immune responses (in mice) to some cancers and viruses. The original paper however has since been retracted upon recommendation of Imperial College's investigators due to concerns about duplication of data.

The protein was considered responsible for an increased production of T cells in mice. The protein was believed to be a potential target for drug discovery. Scientists at Imperial College planned a gene therapy based on this protein.
