= Loveblows & Lovecries – A Confession =

Studio album by No-Man
- Released: 17 May 1993
- Recorded: 1990–1993
- Genre: Trip hop, synth-pop, art rock, art pop
- Length: 46:52
- Label: One Little Indian
- Producer: Steven Wilson

No-Man chronology
Lovesighs – An Entertainment (1992)	Loveblows & Lovecries – A Confession (1993)	Flowermouth (1994)

Professional ratings
Review scores
Source	Rating
AllMusic	4/5 stars
The Big Issue	4/5 stars
Q	3/5 stars

Loveblows & Lovecries – A Confession is the debut album of British art rock band No-Man. It was released in the UK by One Little Indian Records label in May 1993, and in a slightly different format in the US on 550 Music in May, 1994.

"Taking It Like a Man", a single taken from the US version of the album reached number 34 on the Billboard Dance Chart in April 1994 and was used on the US TV drama, Models, Inc.

Critically lauded at the time of its release, the album was considered by the likes of UK magazines Melody Maker and Lime Lizard as an intriguing combination of art rock ambition, synthpop textures, and infectious pop hooks.

== Track listing ==
=== LP and Cassette Release ===
==== Side one ====
1. "Loveblow" – 1:24
2. "Only Baby" – 3:47
3. "Housekeeping" – 5:29
4. "Sweetheart Raw" – 6:04
5. "Lovecry" – 4:52

==== Side two ====
1. "Tulip" – 3:56
2. "Break Heaven" – 4:59
3. "Beautiful and Cruel" – 4:48
4. "Painting Paradise" – 7:32
5. "Heaven's Break" – 4:01

=== UK CD Release ===
1. "Loveblow" – 1:24
2. "Only Baby" – 3:47
3. "Housekeeping" – 5:29
4. "Sweetheart Raw" – 6:04
5. "Lovecry" – 4:52
6. "Tulip" – 3:56
7. "Break Heaven" – 4:59
8. "Beautiful and Cruel" – 4:48
9. "Painting Paradise" – 7:32
10. "Heaven's Break" – 4:01

=== Limited Edition Double CD Release ===
Includes the EP Lovesighs – An Entertainment as a bonus disc.

==== Disc one ====
1. "Loveblow" – 1:24
2. "Only Baby" – 3:47
3. "Housekeeping" – 5:29
4. "Sweetheart Raw" – 6:04
5. "Lovecry" – 4:52
6. "Tulip" – 3:56
7. "Break Heaven" – 4:59
8. "Beautiful and Cruel" – 4:48
9. "Painting Paradise" – 7:32
10. "Heaven's Break" – 4:01

==== Disc two ====
1. "Heartcheat Pop" – 3:52
2. "Days in the Trees – Mahler" – 6:21
3. "Drink Judas" – 3:44
4. "Heartcheat Motel" – 4:38
5. "Kiss Me Stupid" – 4:42
6. "Colours" – 4:10
7. "Iris Murdoch Cut Me Up" – 5:19
8. "Days in the Trees – Reich" – 2:35

=== US CD Release ===
The US edition additionally includes "Taking It Like a Man" and a remix of the single "Days in the Trees".

1. "Loveblow" – 1:24
2. "Only Baby" – 3:47
3. "Housekeeping" – 5:29
4. "Sweetheart Raw" – 6:04
5. "Lovecry" – 4:52
6. "Tulip" – 3:56
7. "Taking It Like a Man" – 6:54
8. "Break Heaven" – 4:59
9. "Beautiful and Cruel" – 4:48
10. "Days in the Trees: Mahler" – 7:03
11. "Painting Paradise" – 7:32
12. "Heaven's Break" – 4:01

Housekeeping: The OLI Years Version

1. Loveblow - 1:24
2. Only Baby - 3:46
3. Housekeeping - 5:29
4. Sweetheart Raw - 6:06
5. Lovecry - 4:52
6. Tulip - 4:05
7. Break Heaven - 4:55
8. Beautiful and Cruel - 4:50
9. Painting Paradise - 7:31
10. Heaven's Break - 4:00
11. Taking It Like a Man - 7:41
12. Babyship Blue
13. Tulip - Unedited Master - 6:51

== Personnel ==
Group members:

- Tim Bowness – vocals, words
- Steven Wilson – various instruments
- Ben Coleman – violin

Additional performers:

- Richard Felix – cello on "Loveblow"
- Richard Barbieri – keyboards on "Sweetheart Raw"
- Steve Jansen – drum programming on "Sweetheart Raw"
- Mick Karn – fretless bass on "Sweetheart Raw"

== Release history ==
Region	Date	Label	Format	Catalog
United Kingdom	May 1993	One Little Indian	LP	TPLP 57
United Kingdom	May 1993	One Little Indian	Cassette	TPLP 57 C
United Kingdom	May 1993	One Little Indian	CD	TPLP 57 CD
United Kingdom	May 1993	One Little Indian	Double CD, limited edition	TPLP 57 CDL
United States	May 1994	550 Music	CD	BK 53949
