= Love You to Bits =

Studio album by No-Man
- Released: 22 November 2019
- Recorded: At various intervals between Summer 1994 – Summer 2019
- Studio: nomansland, UK and others
- Genre: Art rock, electropop, dance, ambient
- Length: 36:00
- Label: Caroline International / Universal
- Producer: No-Man

No-Man chronology
Schoolyard Ghosts (2008)	Love You to Bits (2019)

Love You to Bits is the seventh studio album by No-Man.

Released as the first album for 11 years after Schoolyard Ghosts (2008), the album consists of two five-part song cycles and has been described as, "Chronicling the aftermath of a relationship from different perspectives". Within the songs, each part is called a "bit" or a "piece". Musically, the album represents a return to the more electronic, beat-driven sound of the band's earliest albums, while also incorporating conceptual and organic elements that echo approaches heard on the band's later releases.

"Love You to Bits" (Bit 1) was released as a single in early November 2019, along with a 13-minute non-album instrumental B-side entitled "Love You to Shreds (Shreds 1–3)".

The album was produced, written and performed by No-Man and mixed by Bruno Ellingham, former Miles Davis keyboard player Adam Holzman, drummer Ash Soan, The Dave Desmond Brass Quintet, No-Man live bassist Pete Morgan and Slovak Jazz guitarist David Kollar guest.

== Critical reception ==
Professional ratings
Review scores
Source	Rating
Under the Radar	8/10 stars
Sputnikmusic	3.8/5 stars

The album received favourable reviews in publications including Classic Pop, Classic Rock, Record Collector, Louder Than War, Prog, Electronic Sound and Mojo in the UK, Eclipsed and Rolling Stone in Germany, Classic Rock and Prog in Italy, Metal Hammer and Teraz Rock in Poland, and more. It holds an average score of 3.6/5 on Sputnikmusic based on ratings from 31 users.

Writing for Under the Radar, Stephen Humphries gave the album eight out of 10 stars. Raul Stanciu from Sputnikmusic gave the album 3.8 out of 5 stars and defined it as a "polarizing record" while remarking "the piece can be better appreciated when digested as a whole".

== Physical formats ==
The album is available on CD in a digipack with booklet and as a black 180g vinyl edition. Limited edition blue vinyl and cassette versions were available via the band's store and sold out during the pre-release period.

== Track listing ==
All lyrics are written by Tim Bowness.

No.	Title	Music	Length
1.	"Love You to Bits (Bits 1–5)"	No-Man	17:03
2.	"Love You to Pieces (Pieces 1–5)"	No-Man	18:54
Total length:			35:57

== Charts ==
Chart (2019)	Peak position
UK Top 100 Physical Albums	44
UK Vinyl Albums	23
UK Top 100 Albums	94
UK Prog Albums Top 30	4
Official Scottish Albums Top 100	57
