= Live in Mexico City (Bass Communion and Pig album) =

Live album by Bass Communion / Pig
- Released: August 2008
- Recorded: 27 February 2008
- Genres: Ambient, drone
- Label: Important Records

Live in Mexico City is a live recording of a performance of ambient and drone by Bass Communion, the musical project of British musician Steven Wilson, with Mexican noise improvisation group Pig, in Laboratorio De Arte Alameda, Mexico City on 27 February 2008. It was limited to 500 copies in screen printed covers, available in 5 different color cover/vinyl combinations, 100 of each. Since 7 May 2009 the entire album is available as a digital download from the Burning Shed online store.

== Track listing ==
Side 1
No.	Title	Length
1.	"Side 1A"	2:29
2.	"Side 1B"	17:12

Side 2
No.	Title	Length
1.	"Side 2"	18.54

== Personnel ==
- Steven Wilson - guitar, laptop
- Andres Solis - turntables
- Rogelio Sosa - voice
- Daniel Goldaracena - devices
