= Ghosts on Magnetic Tape =

Studio album by Bass Communion
- Released: February 2004
- Recorded: May–August 2003
- Genre: Ambient, dark ambient, drone, tape music
- Length: 56:27
- Label: Headphone Dust
- Producer: Steven Wilson

Bass Communion chronology
III (2001)	Ghosts on Magnetic Tape (2004)	Indicates Void (2005)

Professional ratings
Review scores
Source	Rating
Dusted	(positive)

Ghosts on Magnetic Tape is the fourth studio album released by British musician, songwriter, and producer Steven Wilson under the pseudonym Bass Communion. It was created primarily from processing 78 rpm records and piano sources. There was a limited edition of 300 copies available as a double CD including Andrew Liles' reconstruction disc.

The fourth track contains samples from Bernard Herrmann's score for Martin Scorsese's 1976 film "Taxi Driver".

== Track listing ==
Standard Edition and CD 1 (only on the Limited Edition)
No.	Title	Length
1.	"Ghosts on Magnetic Tape I"	12:45
2.	"Ghosts on Magnetic Tape II"	7:02
3.	"Ghosts on Magnetic Tape III"	10:15
4.	"Ghosts on Magnetic Tape IV"	8:17
5.	"Ghosts on Magnetic Tape V"	18:48

=== Limited edition ===
CD 2 – Andrew Liles Reconstruction

1. Part I – 9:17
2. Part II – 11:04
3. Part III – 9:56
4. Part IV – 10:18
5. Part V – 16:33

2LP

Side A

1. Ghosts on Magnetic Tape I – 12:45
2. Ghosts on Magnetic Tape II – 7:02

Side B

1. Ghosts on Magnetic Tape III – 10:15
2. Ghosts on Magnetic Tape IV – 8:17

Side C

1. Ghosts on Magnetic Tape V – 18:48

Side D

1. Ghosts on Magnetic Tape out-take – 16:04

== Personnel ==
- Steven Wilson – All Instruments
- Theo Travis – Flute on 5
- Jonathan Coleclough – Additional sample material

=== Other ===
- Carl Glover (for Aleph) – Graphic Design and photography

== Release history ==
Region	Date	Label	Format	Catalog
United Kingdom	February 2004	Headphone Dust	CD	HDBCCD9
United Kingdom	February 2006	Tonefloat	Double LP	TF23
Netherlands	October 2021	Tonefloat	Double LP reissue (clear vinyl)	TF202X
