= Loss (Bass Communion album) =

Studio album by Bass Communion
- Released: January 2006
- Recorded: 2004–2005
- Genres: Ambient; drone
- Length: 39:05
- Label: Soleilmoon
- Producer: Steven Wilson

Bass Communion chronology
Indicates Void (2005)	Loss (2006)	Pacific Codex (2008)

CD/DVD-A Edition
- Cover of the CD/DVD-A edition

Loss is the sixth studio album by British musician, songwriter and producer Steven Wilson released under the pseudonym Bass Communion, and was limited to only 450 copies on vinyl. The original pressing featured a scented inner sleeve.

The album consists of a title track split in two parts. It was re-issued shortly after, in a CD+DVD-A edition containing both Stereo and 5.1 Surround mixes. In February 2009, it was also re-issued as a limited edition 12" picture disc vinyl version of 500 copies.

== Track listing ==
All music is composed by Steven Wilson.

Vinyl
No.	Title	Length
1.	"Loss - Part 1"	19:34
2.	"Loss - Part 2"	18:52

CD+DVD
No.	Title	Length
1.	"Untitled"	19:26
2.	"Untitled"	18:52

== Release history ==
Region	Date	Label	Format	Catalog
United States	January 2006	Soleilmoon	12" LP	SOLV11
United States	November 2006	Soleilmoon	CD / DVDA	SOL 155 CD/ SDVD5
United States	February 2009	Soleilmoon	Picture disc	SOLV11p

== Credits ==
- Produced by Steven Wilson
- Sleeve design by Carl Glover for Aleph
