= Returning Jesus =

Studio album by No-Man
- Released: 27 March 2001; 3 November 2017 (double CD re-issue)
- Recorded: August 1994 to January 2001
- Studio: No-Man's Land, Hemel Hempstead, and Foel Studio, Wales
- Genre: Post-rock, art rock
- Length: 56:00 (CD); 126:03 (Vinyl)
- Label: 3rd. Stone Ltd.
- Producer: Tim Bowness, Steven Wilson

No-Man chronology
Wild Opera (1996)	Returning Jesus (2001)	Together We're Stranger (2003)

Professional ratings
Review scores
Source	Rating
Allmusic	4/5 stars

Returning Jesus is the fourth studio album by British art rock band No-Man, released on the 3rd Stone records on 27 March 2001.

== History ==
A collection of ambitious songs which combined classical, jazz, soul and ambient influences in an original and emotional way, the album received good reviews in Q, Uncut and Classic rock. Additionally, having signed to Lava/WEA, the increasing profile of Steven Wilson's work with Porcupine Tree brought the No-Man name to a new audience.

One of the guest musicians on the album was Porcupine Tree's Colin Edwin, who played double bass, Ian Carr, Steve Jansen, Theo Travis and Ben Castle.

In keeping with other No-Man releases, "Something Falls" reuses previous Steven Wilson music, reinterpreting the guitar progression from "Spiral Circus" (on The Sky Moves Sideways by his main band, Porcupine Tree). Additionally, opening song "Only Rain" samples strings from the end of "Watching Over Me", a track on the 1994 No-Man album Flowermouth.

Unusually, the tracks "All That You Are" and "Carolina Skeletons" were released as singles, in the first case two years after the album's release (February 2003) and in the latter three years prior to it (October 1998).

=== Releases ===
In August 2006, the album was released in a limited edition triple vinyl format on the Dutch label, Tonefloat. This edition included outtakes, demos and b-sides taken from the recording sessions (which spanned 7 years).

A Kscope label double CD reissue of the album was available from 3 November 2017, featuring a new remaster by Steven Wilson. This double CD contains the original album, plus a bonus CD of b-sides (EPs Carolina Skeletons from 1998 and All That You Are from 2003), demos and alternate versions (including some previously unreleased recordings), presented in a digipak with a 16-page booklet with sleeve notes by Tim Bowness and additional artwork and photography from regular collaborator Carl Glover. The first 500 orders came with an exclusive postcard signed by Tim Bowness and Steven Wilson.

== Track listing ==
All tracks are written by Tim Bowness and Steven Wilson, except where noted.

No.	Title	Writer(s)	Length
1.	"Only Rain"	Bowness, David Kosten, Wilson	7:24
2.	"No Defence"		5:20
3.	"Close Your Eyes"		8:25
4.	"Carolina Skeletons"		5:08
5.	"Outside the Machine"		5:46
6.	"Returning Jesus"		5:19
7.	"Slow It All Down"	Wilson	3:42
8.	"Lighthouse"		8:12
9.	"All That You Are"	Bowness	4:44

=== Vinyl LP 'Complete Sessions' Edition ===
Disc 1
No.	Title	Length
1.	"Only Rain"	7:24
2.	"No Defence"	5:20
3.	"Close Your Eyes"	8:25
4.	"Carolina Skeletons"	5:08
5.	"Outside the Machine"	5:46
6.	"Returning Jesus"	5:19
7.	"Slow It All Down"	3:42

Disc 2
No.	Title	Length
1.	"Lighthouse"	8:12
2.	"All That You Are"	4:44
3.	"Something Falls"	3:31
4.	"Carolina Reprise"	2:56
5.	"Close Your Eyes" (EP version)	7:47
6.	"Until Tomorrow"	3:00
7.	"Chelsea Cap"	5:23
8.	"Darkroom"	3:52
9.	"Until Tomorrow"	3:16

Disc 3
No.	Title	Length
1.	"Song About the Heart" (22 February 1994)	2:47
2.	"Darkroom" (alternate version, February 1998)	5:34
3.	"Like a Child" (August 1998)	4:08
4.	"Chelsea Cap" (alternate version, December 1997)	6:50
5.	"Lighthouse" (demo, April 1994)	9:04
6.	"Slow It All Down" (long version, September 1998)	5:13
7.	"All That You Are" (demo, September 1996)	4:37

== Personnel ==
- Tim Bowness – vocals, words
- Steven Wilson – instruments

with:

- Steve Jansen – drums, percussion
- Colin Edwin – bass & double bass
- David Kosten – synth drone / ride cymbal / co-production (1)
- Theo Travis – saxophone (7), flute (8)
- Ian Carr – trumpet (1)
- Ian Dixon – trumpet (2), flugelhorn (3)
- Ben Christophers – acoustic guitar (1)
