= No-Man =

English art pop duo

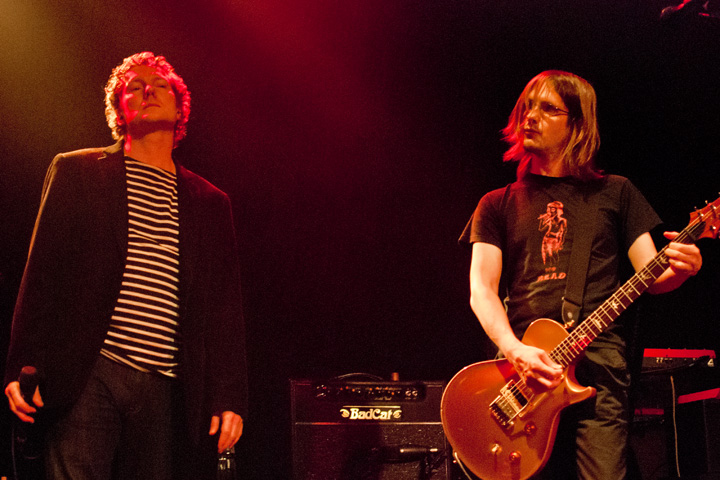
- Tim Bowness (left) and Steven Wilson performing with No-Man in 2012

Background information
- Origin: England
- Genres: Art rock; ambient; trip hop; dream pop
- Years active: 1987–present
- Labels: One Little Indian; Snapper; Kscope; Epic; Resurgence/Voiceprint; 3rd Stone Ltd.; Materiali Sonori; Burning Shed; Headphone Dust
- Members: Tim Bowness; Steven Wilson; Current live members Stephen Bennett; Pete Morgan; Michael Bearpark; Steve Bingham; Andy Booker
- Past members: Ben Coleman; Stuart Blagden; Past live members Richard Barbieri; Peter Chilvers; Steve Jansen; Mick Karn; Chris Maitland; Silas Maitland
- Website: no-man.co.uk

No-Man are an English art pop duo, formed in 1987 as No Man Is an Island (Except the Isle of Man) by singer Tim Bowness and multi-instrumentalist Steven Wilson. The band has so far produced seven studio albums and a number of singles/outtakes collections (including 2006's career retrospective All the Blue Changes). The band was once lauded as "conceivably the most important English group since The Smiths" by Melody Maker music newspaper, and a 2017 article of Drowned in Sound described them as "probably the most underrated band of the last 25 years".

Originally creating a sample-based proto-trip hop/ambient/electropop-styled music, No-Man has pursued a more organic, diverse and band-oriented sound in subsequent years. Drawing from a diverse mix of singer-songwriter, post rock, minimalist, progressive rock, jazz and contemporary ambient sources for inspiration, No-Man's musical style is distinctive yet difficult to categorise.

== History ==
=== Formation (1986–1989) ===
Steven Wilson originally launched the band in 1986 as a solo project called No Man Is an Island (Except the Isle of Man), recording an instrumental track called "From a Toyshop Window", which blended progressive rock with synth pop. In 1987, he linked up with singer, lyricist and occasional guitarist and keyboard player Tim Bowness, who at the time was singing with Liverpool-based art-pop band Plenty (not to be confused with the more recent Japanese indie rock band Plenty).

Bowness and Wilson continued working together on recording sessions for the next two years. Violinist Ben Coleman joined the project after becoming involved with recording sessions in late 1988. The band established a four-piece live line-up in 1989 by adding guitarist Stuart Blagden (who had previously played with Bowness in the Manchester-based band Still).

No Man Is an Island released their debut single, a waltz-time ballad called "The Girl from Missouri", on Plastic Head Records in mid-1989. The band was disappointed with the single and soon disowned it. Subsequent band evolutions saw flirtations with aggressive synth-pop (on the "Swagger" cassette EP) and the departure of Blagden (who would later become a jazz and Latin music player).

=== No-Man's pop years (1990–1994) ===
By 1990, No Man Is an Island had shortened their name to No-Man and become a voice/violin/guitar-and-tapes trio (with Wilson handling all other instruments and programming in the studio).

The first release under the No-Man name was the self-pressed June 1990 single release, "Colours" (a cover of the 1960s Donovan Leich song with crooned vocals and a dub-loop arrangement anticipating the later arrival of trip hop). The single achieved Melody Maker, Sounds and Channel 4 teletext "Singles of the Week" accolades and was re-released by Liverpool-based label Probe Plus in October 1990.

The attention which "Colours" had received led to No-Man being signed by Dave Massey to a long-term music publishing songwriting agreement with independent Hit & Run Music Publishing. Massey soon secured a recording contract with the independent label One Little Indian. During this period, the band received highly positive UK music media support (including more Singles of the Week in Melody Maker, Sounds and Irish music paper Hot Press) and had two indie top 20 hits ("Days in the Trees" and "Ocean Song") plus a Billboard Top 40 dance hit (the US-only single, "Taking It Like A Man", at No. 34).

No-Man's debut mini-album (a compilation of EP tracks called Lovesighs – An Entertainment) was released in April 1992, and in October of the same year the band toured England with a six-piece line-up including three ex-members of the band Japan – Mick Karn, Steve Jansen and (most significantly) keyboardist Richard Barbieri, who had been recruited by Massey. The band's first full-length album (the more pop-oriented Loveblows & Lovecries - A Confession) followed in May 1993. By this time, the live band included bass player Silas Maitland and the (unrelated) drummer Chris Maitland. (The latter would join both Wilson and Richard Barbieri in the live lineup of Porcupine Tree.)

In 1994 No-Man released their second album, Flowermouth. Although the band parted company with violinist Ben Coleman during the sessions, he made a significant contribution towards most of the tracks on the record. No-Man also stopped performing live in 1994, and would not return to the stage until 2006.

=== The move towards art-rock (1995–2000) ===
Two albums released in 1995 closed the first phase of the band's career - a set of ambient dance reworkings of Flowermouth material called Flowermix and a compilation of the band's more ambient and atmospheric One Little Indian-era B-sides and rarities called Heaven Taste.

With each subsequent release the band moved further away from its more conventional pop and rock roots, mirroring the evolution of artists such as Talk Talk, David Sylvian, Radiohead, Scott Walker and Kate Bush. Since the mid-1990s, No-Man has released a steady stream of albums via Snapper Music and 3rd Stone/Adasam, featuring guests such as Fripp, Barbieri, Jansen, Theo Travis and Pat Mastellotto. The band has maintained a healthy cult following as well as continued critical acclaim.

1996's Wild Opera and its 1997 companion release Dry Cleaning Ray (both released on 3rd Stone Ltd.) explored a combination of darker dance sounds, experimental art-rock and deep trip hop, while maintaining No-Man's particular skill with ballads. An EP of all-new material, Carolina Skeletons, followed in 1998.

In 1999, the band released Speak, a compilation of mostly unreleased early ambient songs recorded a decade previously but which Bowness and Wilson considered to be of equal merit to the music released on One Little Indian or 3rd Stone Ltd.

=== Organic balladeers (2000–2018) ===
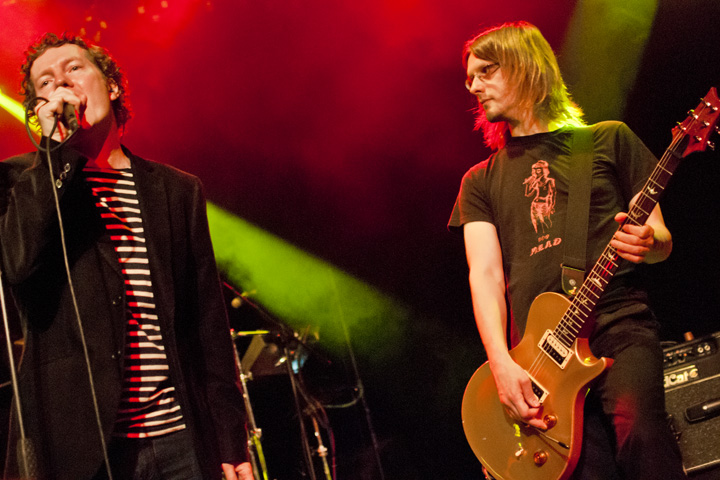
Performance at Klub Studio, 2012 (Kraków)

Speak's quieter and more atmospheric approach pointed the way towards No-Man's subsequent output. 2001's Returning Jesus (the last album to be released on 3rd Stone Ltd.) resurrected and expanded the eclectic ballad, jazz and progressive rock influences of Flowermouth and brought the band to a new and revived audience, some of whom had come in via the continued success of Wilson's other main project, Porcupine Tree.

Signing a new deal with Snapper Music, the band went on to release Together We're Stranger in 2003 - a sombre, moving record with strong tone poem elements detailing (in abstract) the break-up of a relationship and responses to bereavement.

In 2006, No-Man made a rare live performance at the Norwich Garage (part of a Burning Shed label event).

The band released Schoolyard Ghosts on 12 May 2008, receiving some of the most favourable reviews of the band's career (the album was described as "truly sublime" by Classic Rock magazine). Guest musicians included Pat Mastelotto, Theo Travis, Gavin Harrison, Colin Edwin, Bruce Kaphan (ex-American Music Club) and The London Session Orchestra (arranged by Dave Stewart).

On 27 May 2008, it was announced that No-Man's music will be featured in the film by award-winning student film-maker Dan Faltz, Weak Species. The film is based on the writings of Dennis Cooper and is currently being considered for expanded feature film treatment.

No-Man played its first full performance in fifteen years at London's Bush Hall on 29 August 2008. This performance was followed by two more concerts in Zoetermeer (The Netherlands) and Düsseldorf (Germany) on 3 and 4 September respectively. The Zoetermeer concert was No-Man's first concert outside of the UK.

Mixtaped—a double DVD package including a film of the sell-out London performance, a documentary of the group's history and assorted promotional videos—was released in October 2009. Early releases of the DVD ordered from Burning Shed included an audio CD recording of highlights from the Bush Hall show. The DVD was voted No. 5 in the Classic Rock Presents Prog 2010 critic's poll.

On 22 December 2011, the band announced through their Facebook page that a new live recording, titled Love and Endings, recorded at the Leamington Spa Assembly in October 2011 would be released on 27 February 2012. It was followed by a 5-date tour, including first performance in Poland on 26 August 2012.

=== Return to synth-pop roots (2019-present) ===
Wilson announced in late 2018 that he was working with Bowness on a new No-Man album, the band's first full-length album of original material since 2008's Schoolyard Ghosts. Wilson described the album as "music that in many ways sees a return to our roots as a synth-pop band, albeit with the conceptual sweep of our more recent albums". In September 2019 the band announced their new album, Love You to Bits, which was released on 22 November 2019.

== Band line-up ==
Current members

- Tim Bowness – lead and backing vocals (plus occasional guitars, keyboards, tapes and programming) (1987–present)
- Steven Wilson – guitars, keyboards, bass, programming, samples, various instruments, backing vocals, engineering (1987–present)

Former members

- Ben Coleman – violins (1988–1993)
- Stuart Blagden – guitars (1989–1990)

Guest studio contributors

- All four other past and present members of Porcupine Tree, Steven Wilson's band, including bassist Colin Edwin, drummers Chris Maitland and Gavin Harrison, and keyboardist Richard Barbieri
- electronic artists Roger Eno, Faultline, Scanner, Muslimgauze and The Shamen
- jazz musicians Ian Carr, Theo Travis and Ben Castle
- King Crimson personnel Robert Fripp, Pat Mastelotto, Mel Collins and Gavin Harrison
- ex-Japan and Rain Tree Crow members Steve Jansen, Mick Karn and also Porcupine Tree member Richard Barbieri
- US pedal steel Bruce Kaphan (ex-American Music Club)

Current live members

- Stephen Bennett – keyboards
- Pete Morgan – bass guitar
- Michael Bearpark – guitar
- Steve Bingham – electric violin
- Andy Booker – acoustic and electronic drums

== Discography ==
=== Studio albums ===
- Loveblows & Lovecries – A Confession (1993, One Little Indian Records Ltd, TPLP57CD / 1994, Sony 550 in the US)
- Flowermouth (1994, One Little Indian Records Ltd, TPLP67CD / 1994, Nippon Columbia in Japan)
- Wild Opera (1996, 3rd Stone Records Ltd, STONE 027CD)
- Returning Jesus (2001, 3rd Stone Records Ltd, STONE 038CD; 2017, kscope496 2CD reissue)
- Together We're Stranger (2003, Snapper Music PLC, SMACD867 (original digipak) / KSCOPE105D (super jewel-case reissue)
- Schoolyard Ghosts (2008, Snapper Music PLC; 2009, KSCOPE103)
- Love You to Bits (2019)

=== Live albums ===
- Highlights from Mixtaped (2009, Burning Shed, nmsg2) – bonus CD added to initial pre-orders of the Mixtaped DVD from the Burning Shed online store.
- Love and Endings (2012, Burning Shed, bshed1201) – Recorded live at the Leamington Spa Assembly on 14 October 2011. CD version includes a bonus DVD of the concert

=== Compilations / others ===
- Island of Circles (1992, Nettwerk, W2-30075) – Donovan tribute album by various artists, featured in the cover version of the song Turquoise
- Heaven Taste (1995, Hidden Art, HI-ART 1) – Mini-album of B-sides and unreleased tracks
- Flowermix (1995, Hidden Art, HI-ART 2) – Remix album
- Radio Sessions: 92–96 (1998, Burning Shed) – Mail order CD-R of tracks recorded for various radio sessions
- Speak (1999, Materiali Sonori, MASO CD 90111 (original release) / 2004, Snapper Music PLC, SDPCD 194 (reissue with bonus track)
- Lost Songs Vol 1 (2001, Burning Shed) – Mail order CD-R of unreleased tracks
- All The Blue Changes – An Anthology 1988–2003 (2006, Hidden Art, HI-ART 19) – Compilation with some unreleased versions and an unreleased track
- Housekeeping – The OLI Years 1990-1994 (2024, One Little Indian Records Ltd.)
- Swagger: Lost Not Lost Volume One, 1989/1990 (2024, Companion release to the Housekeeping boxset with 6 unreleased songs and 3 early versions of others)

=== Singles and EPs ===
==== As No Man Is an Island ====
- The Girl from Missouri (1989, Plastic Head Records, PLAS S 012 ) – 12" only
- Swagger (1989, Hidden Art/Independent) – Cassette only

==== As No-Man ====
- Colours (1990, Probe Plus Records) – 12" only
- Days in the Trees (1991, One Little Indian Records Ltd, 57TP7CD) – 12" and CD
- Ocean Song (1992, One Little Indian Records Ltd, 63TP7CD)
- Lovesighs – An Entertainment (1992, One Little Indian Records Ltd, TPLP47MCD) – Debut mini-album
- Sweetheart Raw (1993, One Little Indian Records Ltd, 73TP7CD)
- Only Baby (1993, One Little Indian Records Ltd, 83TP7CD)
- Painting Paradise EP (1993, One Little Indian Records Ltd, 93TP7CD)
- Taking It Like a Man (1994, Sony Music Entertainment Inc, 46K 77463) – US-only EP
- Housewives Hooked on Heroin (1996, 3rd Stone Records Ltd, STONE 026CD)
- Dry Cleaning Ray (1997, 3rd Stone Records Ltd, STONE 035CD) – Mini-album, regarded as a companion release to Wild Opera
- Carolina Skeletons (1998, 3rd Stone Records Ltd, STONE 037CD)
- All That You Are (2003, Hidden Art, HI-ART 18)
- The Break-Up for Real (2007) – Download only. All tracks are also included on All the Blue Changes and the DVD-A remaster of Together We're Stranger
- Wherever There Is Light (2009, Snapper Music PLC, KSCOPE127S) – Enhanced five-track EP

=== Videography ===
- Mixtaped (2009, Snapper Music PLC, KSCOPE505) – 2 DVD, Live at Bush Hall, London (29/08/08) and Documentary
- Love and Endings (2012, Burning Shed, bshed1201) – DVD only available as a bonus disc to the CD version of the album

== Charting songs / albums ==
Song	Chart	Position	Year
"Taking It Like a Man"	US Billboard Dance/Club Play	34	1994
"Heaven Taste"	UK Vinyl Singles	5	2016
"Heaven Taste"	UK Top 100 Physical Singles	8	2016
Love You to Bits	UK Top 100 Physical Albums	44	2019
Love You to Bits	UK Vinyl Albums	23	2019
Love You to Bits	UK Top 100 Albums	94	2019
Love You to Bits	Official Scottish Albums Top 100	57	2019
Love You to Bits	UK Progressive Albums	4	2019

== See also ==
- List of ambient music artists
