= Bass Communion =

British musical project

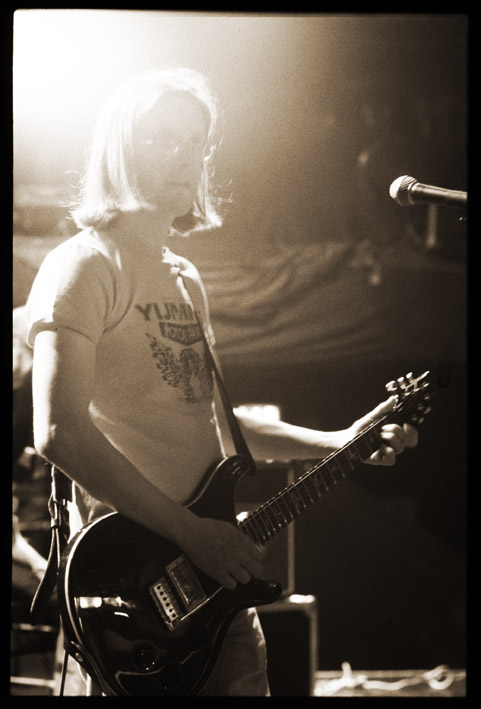
- Steven Wilson in 2004

Background information
- Origin: England
- Genres: Ambient; experimental; drone
- Years active: 1994–present
- Labels: Burning Shed; Coup Sur Coup; Headphone Dust; Hidden Art; Soleilmoon; Tonefloat
- Members: Steven Wilson
- Website: Official website

Bass Communion is a solo project of English musician Steven Wilson, best known for his lead role in the rock band Porcupine Tree. Records released under the name Bass Communion are in an ambient or electronic vein—lengthy, drone-heavy compositions. They come about as experiments made from processing the sound of real instruments and field recordings.

Bass Communion's albums have often featured collaborations with other musicians, including Robert Fripp of King Crimson, saxophonist Theo Travis, Bryn Jones, and Vidna Obmana.

== History ==
Bass Communion has origins in Steven Wilson's earliest work as a musician. Taking influence from German experimental electronic music artist such as Tangerine Dream, Klaus Schulze, and Conrad Schnitzler, Wilson, along with childhood friend Simon Vockings, formed the group Altamont in 1983. They experimented with primitive analog synthesizers, recording their performances, without the use of multitracking. These recordings were compiled on the tape Prayer for the Soul in September 1983 and released on the Acid Tapes label, then run by future Imaginary Records boss Alan Duffy.

By the 1990s, Wilson began to notice an increasing amount of music shaped by the same experimental artists who inspired Altamont. Hearing artists such as Paul Schutze and Biosphere, Wilson felt that it was an ideal time to revisit experimental electronic music. The first self-titled Bass Communion album, often referred to as Bass Communion I, was released in April 1998.

== Discography ==
=== Studio albums ===
- Bass Communion I (1998)
- Bass Communion II (1999)
- Bass Communion III (2001)
- Ghosts on Magnetic Tape (2004)
- Indicates Void (2005)
- Loss (2006)
- Pacific Codex (2008)
- Molotov and Haze (2008)
- Cenotaph (2011)
- The Itself of Itself (2024)
- Apparitions (2026)

=== Remix albums ===
- Bass Communion (Reconstructions and Recycling) (2003)
- Jonathan Coleclough / Bass Communion / Colin Potter (2003)

=== Compilations ===
- Atmospherics (1999)
- Untitled (Bass Communion Box) (2014)
- Remixed by BC: 2003–2009 (2019)

=== Live albums ===
- Chiaroscuro (2009)

=== EPs ===
- Dronework (2005)
- Haze Shrapnel (2008)
- Litany (2009)
- Sisters Oregon (2017)
- And No Birds Sing (2021)
- Thief of Snow (1999) (2024)
- Sisters Extrapool (2024)

=== Singles ===
- "Vajrayana / Aum Shinrikyo" (2004)
- "Headwind / Tailwind" (split single with Freiband) (2009)
- "Drugged (Immersion Version)" (2026)
- "Dronework Requiem (Immersion Version)" (2026)
- "Haze (Immersion Version)" (2026)
- "Litany (Immersion Version)" (2026)

=== Collaborations ===
- Bass Communion V Muslimgauze (1999)
- Continuum I (2005)
- Continuum II (2007)
- Bass Communion / Pig – Live in Mexico City (2008)
- Bass Communion / Freiband (2017)
- Precision Surgery Inversions (2018)
- Bass Communion / Modelbau – Analysis Reveals Nothing of Substance (2026)

== See also ==
- List of ambient music artists
