= I.E.M. (album) =

Studio album by Incredible Expanding Mindfuck
- Released: 1996
- Recorded: 1996 / 1998
- Genres: Psychedelic rock; Krautrock
- Length: 38:28 (Vinyl); 44:46 (CD)
- Labels: Chromatic; CHR 001; Delerium; DELEC CD 047
- Producer: Steven Wilson

Incredible Expanding Mindfuck chronology
I.E.M. (1996)	An Escalator to Christmas (1999)

Professional ratings
Review scores
Source	Rating
Revolver	4/5 stars

I.E.M. is the debut album of Steven Wilson's side project, Incredible Expanding Mindfuck. The original 1996 vinyl edition on Chromatic Records was limited to 500 copies. An expanded CD edition was released by Delerium Records in 1998.

The album was also included in the 2010 Complete I.E.M, CD boxset where it reverted to the original vinyl track listing.

== Track listing ==
All tracks written by Steven Wilson.

1. "The Gospel According to the I.E.M." – 12:56
2. "The Last Will and Testament of Emma Peel" – 8:08
3. "Fie Kesh" – 8:23
4. "Deafman" – 9:01
5. "Headphone Dust" – 6:18 (1998 CD version only)

== Credits ==
=== I.E.M. ===
- Steven Wilson - all instruments

== See also ==
- List of ambient music artists
