= Headphone Dust =

English independent record label

- Founder: Steven Wilson
- Genre: Progressive rock, art rock, drone, electronica, experimental music, alternative rock
- Location: London, England
- Official website: headphonedust.store

Headphone Dust is an English independent record label founded by the musician Steven Wilson. It's almost entirely focused on releasing Wilson's own music as well as his remixes of other artists. The only exception to this is the Irish band Fovea Hex.

== Artists ==
- Bass Communion
- Blackfield
- Fovea Hex
- Incredible Expanding Mindfuck
- No-Man
- Porcupine Tree
- Steven Wilson

== Discography ==
- Blackfield - Blackfield II (CD)
- Blackfield - Blackfield II (vinyl)
- Blackfield - Blackfield I (CD)
- Blackfield - Blackfield I (vinyl) (2 LP)
- Bass Communion - Loss (CD+DVDA)
- Bass Communion/Muslimgauze - bcvsmgcd (CD)
- Steven Wilson - Cover Versions I, II, III, IV and V (CD)
- Steven Wilson - Unreleased Electronic Music (CDR)
- Steven Wilson - Unreleased Electronic Music (2 LP)
- Steven Wilson - Cover Versions III & IV (2x7" single, either small or jukebox style center-holes)
- Bass Communion - I (CD)
- Bass Communion - II (CD)
- Bass Communion - Ghosts on Magnetic Tape (CD)
- Bass Communion - Ghosts on Magnetic Tape (2 LP)
- Bass Communion - Dronework (CDR)
- Continuum - Continuum Recyclings (2 LP)
- Continuum - Continuum II (CD)
- IEM - IEM: 1996-1999 (CD)
- IEM - Arcadia Son (LP)
- No-Man - Returning Jesus (3 LP)
- No-Man - Together We're Stranger (LP)
- Porcupine Tree - On the Sunday of Life (2 LP)
- Porcupine Tree - Stupid Dream (2 LP)
- Porcupine Tree - Fear of a Blank Planet
- Bass Communion - Pacific Codex
- Fovea Hex - The Salt Garden 1 (LP+CD)
- Fovea Hex - The Salt Garden 2 (LP+CD)

== See also ==
- List of independent UK record labels
- List of record labels
