= Porcupine Tree discography =

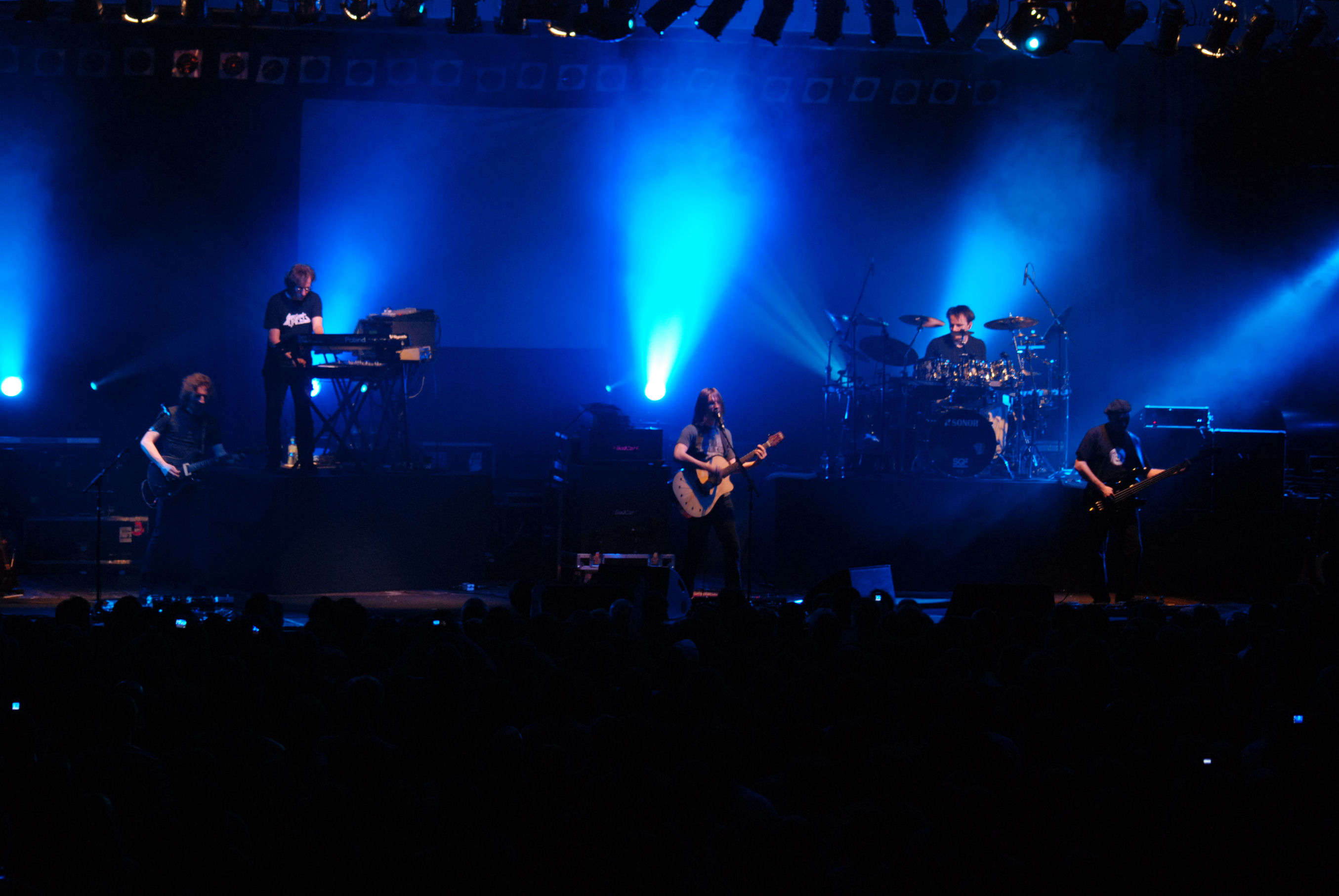
- Porcupine Tree performing live at Kraków, Poland on 7 July 2007.
- Studio albums: 11
- Extended plays: 7
- Live albums: 13
- Compilation albums: 6
- Singles: 11
- Video albums: 2
- Demo tapes: 3
- Promotional: 9
- Music videos: 11
- Box sets: 1

The following is a listing of officially released works by the English band Porcupine Tree. The band has released eleven major studio albums and 7 EPs, as well as many limited editions and revamped material.

At the time Steven Wilson was going to sign to the Delerium label, he owned a lot of material recorded during the mid- and later '80s that he had recorded subsequently on three demo tapes - Tarquin's Seaweed Farm, Love, Death & Mussolini and The Nostalgia Factory. He sent copies of those tapes to people he felt would be interested in the recordings, asking them to spread the word. Delerium originally intended to release all of that material in a double debut album, but Wilson decided to just pick the songs he considered the best ones. These songs were mastered to make Porcupine Tree's first studio album, On the Sunday of Life... (1992); all of the leftover tracks would be later released on a compilation album called Yellow Hedgerow Dreamscape (1994).

Richard Barbieri and Colin Edwin met Steven Wilson to play on a few songs he was working on. Again, there was a number of songs written that would perfectly fit on a double album, but one of these songs saw the light prior to the release of their second studio album on the Voyage 34 (1992) single, thereafter followed by Voyage 34: Remixes (1993), and the other material ended up on the Staircase Infinities (1994) EP. Finally, ten tracks were chosen for their next studio album, Up the Downstair (1993), which Melody Maker described as "a psychedelic masterpiece". At the end of 1993, Chris Maitland joined the band for live shows and would later record some drums and percussions for three songs of Porcupine Tree's third studio album, The Sky Moves Sideways (1995), an album that made the press refer them as the "Pink Floyd of the nineties". They did not record as a full band until Signify (1996), the first Porcupine Tree album to be performed entirely by the four members. It contained shorter compositions and less improvisation than its predecessors.

The next album was delayed for almost three years as the band was looking for a new record label after finishing their deal with Delerium. In the meantime, they launched Metanoia (1998), a compilation of improvisations recorded during the Signify sessions, some of which were later shaped into songs. Finally, they signed to Snapper/K-Scope and the album Stupid Dream (1999) was issued. The album was a departure in style from all their previous works, in favour of a more song-oriented direction, as a consequence this alienated some older fans but brought a lot of new ones. Its follow-up, Lightbulb Sun (2000), assured the fan base and solidified the ground of its predecessor. For this one, they worked with Dave Gregory of XTC, who provided string arrangements. A collection of EP tracks and out-takes from the previous two albums was launched a year after under the title of Recordings (2001).

In Absentia (2002) became one of their most successful works, remaining a favourite to many fans, charting in many European countries and selling over 100,000 copies in its first year of release. The album was the first release to feature Gavin Harrison, replacing Maitland on drums. Deadwing (2005) appeared the Billboard chart at number 132 of the Billboard 200 (which was the first entry the band achieved on the Billboard chart) and was voted the second-best album of 2005 in Sound & Vision, the most widely distributed US magazine in the field of home electronics and entertainment.

Porcupine Tree's next studio album, Fear of a Blank Planet (2007), debuted at number 59 on the Billboard 200, won the Album of the Year award for the 2007 edition of the Classic Rock magazine awards, and was nominated for a Grammy Award in the Best Surround Sound Album category. The album features collaborations with Rush's guitarist Alex Lifeson and King Crimson's Robert Fripp. The title is a play on words relating to Public Enemy's Fear of a Black Planet album.

On 2007 they collaborated with Yoko Ono on the song "Death of Samantha", in Ono's remix album Yes, I'm a Witch.

In September 2007, they released Nil Recurring, an EP of four leftover tracks from the recording sessions for Fear of a Blank Planet. It was released on Transmission, the band's own record label as a limited edition of 5000 copies that did not take long to sell out through the band's online store, Burning Shed, forcing the band to keep printing more copies. Nevertheless, the EP was reissued on 18 February 2008 on Peaceville Records.

An in-store appearance at Park Avenue CDs in Orlando, Florida from 4 October 2007, was recorded and released on CD under the name of We Lost the Skyline. The title is a reference to the lyrics on "The Sky Moves Sideways (Phase One)". The album was released on vinyl on 21 March 2008 and is the first official acoustic live record to be officially released by the band.

A live album from the Fear of a Blank Planet tour, Ilosaarirock, was released in March 2009. It was recorded from their performance at the Ilosaarirock Festival on 14 July 2007. However, this album was only released to members of the Residents of a Blank Planet ticketing club.

On 15 September 2009, the band's tenth studio album was released, titled The Incident, the title track being one solid 55-minute epic. It quickly became the best selling Porcupine Tree album in the world charts to date.

Another live album from the Fear of a Blank Planet tour, Atlanta, was released in June 2010 in order to help raise funds for Mick Karn's treatment for cancer.

The band went on indefinite hiatus in 2010, after which the members focused on their solo work and other projects. In November 2021, Wilson, Barbieri and Harrison announced the reunion of the band, now as a trio with Edwin not returning as a bassist. The eleventh studio album Closure/Continuation, which is the band's first studio album in 13 years, was released on 24 June 2022.

== Albums ==
=== Studio albums ===
Title	Album details	Peak chart positions										Sales
Title	Album details	UK	AUS	FIN	FRA	GER	NLD	NOR	SWE	SWI	US	Sales
On the Sunday of Life...	Released: 21 April 1992; Label: Delerium; Formats: CD, LP, CS, DL	—	—	—	—	—	—	—	—	—	—	
Up the Downstair	Released: 7 June 1993; Label: Delerium; Formats: CD, LP, CS, DL	—	—	—	—	—	—	—	—	—	—	
The Sky Moves Sideways	Released: 30 January 1995; Label: Delerium; Formats: CD, LP, CS, DL	—	—	—	—	—	—	—	—	—	—	
Signify	Released: 30 September 1996; Label: Delerium; Formats: CD, LP, DL	—	—	—	—	—	—	—	—	—	—	
Stupid Dream	Released: 22 March 1999; Label: KScope; Formats: CD, CD+DVD, LP, DL	—	—	—	—	—	—	—	—	—	—	
Lightbulb Sun	Released: 22 May 2000; Label: KScope; Formats: CD, CD+DVD, LP	161	—	—	—	—	—	—	—	—	—	
In Absentia	Released: 23 September 2002; Label: Lava; Formats: CD, CD+DVD, LP, DL	—	—	—	143	58	—	—	—	—	—	
Deadwing	Released: 28 March 2005; Label: Lava; Formats: CD, CD+DVD, LP, DL	97	—	47	100	52	56	—	26	—	132	
Fear of a Blank Planet	Released: 16 April 2007; Label: Roadrunner; Formats: CD, CD+DVD, DVD-A, LP, DL	31	66	16	70	20	13	34	38	41	59	US: 53,000+
The Incident	Released: 14 September 2009; Label: Roadrunner; Formats: CD, CD+DVD, DVD-A, LP, DL	23	35	11	35	17	5	19	23	20	25	US: 25,500+
Closure/Continuation	Released: 24 June 2022; Label: Music For Nations; Formats: CD, CD+BD, LP, Cassette, DL	2	13	2	24	1	1	25	13	1	90	
"—" denotes a recording that did not chart or was not released in that territory.

=== Live albums ===
Title	Album details	Peak chart positions				Sales	Notes
Title	Album details	UK	GER	NLD	SWI	Sales	Notes
Spiral Circus	Released: April 1994; Label: Delerium; Formats: CS, LP	—	—	—	—		Recorded from the mixing desk during three shows in England in December 1993.
Coma Divine	Released: 20 October 1997; Label: Delerium; Formats: CD, LP, DL	—	—	—	—		Recorded during the second and third show at Frontera Club in Rome in March 1997.
XM	Released: July 2003; Label: Transmission; Formats: CD, DL	—	—	—	—		Radio session recorded at XM Satellite Radio in Washington D.C. in November 2002.
Warszawa	Released: February 2004; Label: Transmission; Formats: CD, DL	—	—	—	—		Live radio broadcast recorded for Polskie Radio Program III in Warsaw in April 2001.
XMII	Released: June 2005; Label: Transmission; Formats: CD, DL	—	—	—	—		Radio session recorded at XM Satellite Radio in Washington D.C. in July 2003.
Rockpalast	Released: July 2006; Label: Burning Shed; Formats: DL	—	—	—	—		Live performance recorded for a TV broadcast Rockpalast at Live Music Hall in Cologne, Germany in November 2005.
Arriving Somewhere...	Released: August 2006; Label: Burning Shed/Snapper/Kscope; Formats: CD, DVD	—	—	—	—		Recorded during two shows at Park West in Chicago in October 2005.
We Lost the Skyline	Released: February 2008; Label: Transmission; Formats: CD, LP, DL	—	—	—	—		Recorded during an in-store performance at Park Avenue CDs in Orlando, Florida in October 2007.
Ilosaarirock	Released: March 2009; Label: Transmission; Formats: CD	—	—	—	—		Complete performance recorded at Ilosaarirock festival in Finland in July 2007.
Anesthetize	Released: May 2010; Label: Kscope; Formats: CD, BR	—	—	—	—		Recorded during two concerts at 013 in Tilburg, Netherlands in October 2008.
Atlanta	Released: June 2010; Label: Burning Shed; Formats: DL	—	—	—	—		Complete show recorded at Roxy Theatre, Atlanta in October 2007. The profits of this recording funded the treatment of Mick Karn.
Octane Twisted	Released: November 2012; Label: Kscope; Formats: CD, CD+DVD, DL	70	77	68	86	US: 3,847+	Live album recorded at Riviera Theater in Chicago in April 2010 and at Royal Albert Hall in London in October 2010.
Acoustic Radio Session 2009	Released: 15 March 2020; Formats: DL	—	—	—	—		Three-track acoustic session performance in December 2009 by Steven Wilson and John Wesley. Broadcast details are unknown.
Köln 4th Dec 2007	Released: 16 March 2020; Formats: DL	—	—	—	—		Live performance recorded for a TV broadcast at Palladium in Cologne, Germany.
First Live Performance 4th Dec 1993	Released: 16 March 2020; Formats: DL	—	—	—	—		First ever live performance of Porcupine Tree at The Nag's Head in High Wycombe, recorded from a mixing desk.
BBC Session 13th April 2007	Released: 21 March 2020; Formats: DL	—	—	—	—		Radio session recorded at Maida Vale Studios in London during promotion for Fear of a Blank Planet.
Los Angeles 30th July 2003	Released: 1 May 2020; Label: Transmission; Formats: LP, DL	—	—	—	—		Live performance recorded at House of Blues in Hollywood, Los Angeles. The transparent blue double vinyl edition, limited to 4,000 copies, was released on 30 July 2021 under the title House of Blues – Los Angeles 2003.
Coma:Coda	Released: 7 May 2020; Label: Transmission; Formats: LP, DL	—	—	—	—		Complete second show recorded during the creation of the 1997 live album Coma Divine at Frontiera Club in Rome. The opaque red double vinyl edition, limited to 4,000 copies, was released on 19 August 2022.
Salford	Released: 27 June 2020; Formats: DL	—	—	—	—		Recorded during the first date of the first Porcupine Tree tour of four UK shows in November 1994.
IndigO2	Released: 6 October 2020; Formats: DL	—	—	—	—		Complete show recorded at IndigO2 in London in October 2008 during the Fear of the Blank Planet tour.
Athens	Released: 2 December 2022; Formats: DL	—	—	—	—		Complete live performance at Rodon in Athens in December 1995, recorded from a mixing desk.
Closure/Continuation.Live	Released: 8 December 2023; Label: Music for Nations, Sony Music; Formats: CD+BD, LP	36	—	55	—		Complete live performance at Ziggo Dome in Amsterdam, Netherlands in November 2022 during the Closure/Continuation tour.
"—" denotes a recording that did not chart or was not released in that territory.

=== Compilation albums ===
Title	Album details
Yellow Hedgerow Dreamscape^{[a]}	Released: 15 August 1994; Label: Magic Gnome; Formats: CD, LP
Insignificance	Released: March 1997; Label: Delerium; Formats: CD
Metanoia	Released: December 1998; Label: Delerium; Formats: CD
Voyage 34: The Complete Trip	Released: June 2000; Label: Delerium; Formats: CD
Recordings	Released: May 2001; Label: Snapper; Formats: CD, LP
Stars Die: The Delerium Years 1991–1997	Released: March 2002; Label: Delerium; Formats: CD
The Sound of No One Listening	Released: November 2020; Label: Snapper; Formats: Digital Album

=== Box sets ===
Title	Set details
Delerium Years / 1991-1997	Released: November 2020; Label: Transmission Recordings; Formats: CD

== Extended plays ==
Title	EP details	Peak chart positions		
Title	EP details	FIN	FRA	GER
Staircase Infinities	Released: 10 October 1994; Label: Lazy Eye; Formats: CD, LP	—	—	—
Moonloop	Released: 17 October 1994; Label: Delerium; Formats: CD, LP	—	—	—
Coma Divine II	Released: January 1999; Label: Delerium; Formats: CD	—	—	—
Transmission IV	Released: December 2001; Label: Delerium; Formats: CD, LP	—	—	—
Futile	Released: July 2003; Label: Lava; Formats: CD, DL	—	—	—
Nil Recurring	Released: September 2007; Label: Transmission; Formats: CD, LP	5	114	100
Pure Narcotic	Released: October 2020; Label: Transmission Recordings; Formats: LP, DL	—	—	—
IA/DW/XT	Released: 22 April 2023; Label: Transmission Recordings; Formats: 12"	—	—	—
"—" denotes a recording that did not chart or was not released in that territory.

== Demo tapes ==
Title	Demo details
Tarquin's Seaweed Farm^{[b]}	Released: 1989; Label: No Man's Land; Formats: CS
Love, Death & Mussolini^{[c]}	Released: 1990; Label: No Man's Land; Formats: CS
The Nostalgia Factory^{[d]}	Released: 1991; Label: Delerium; Formats: CS

== Singles ==
Title	Year	Peak chart positions				Album
Title	Year	UK	UK Indie	GER	US Rock	Album
"Voyage 34"	1992	—	—	—	—	Non-album singles
"Voyage 34: Remixes"	1993	—	—	—	—	Non-album singles
"Stars Die"	1995	—	—	—	—	The Sky Moves Sideways
"Waiting"	1996	—	—	—	—	Signify
"Piano Lessons"	1999	164	34	—	—	Stupid Dream
"Stranger by the Minute"	1999	138	13	—	—	Stupid Dream
"Pure Narcotic"	1999	175	46	—	—	Stupid Dream
"Four Chords That Made a Million"	2000	84	16	—	—	Lightbulb Sun
"Shesmovedon"	2000	85	24	—	—	Lightbulb Sun
"Shallow" (Note: EU single cancelled, but sold at shows)	2005	—	—	—	26	Deadwing
"Lazarus"	2005	—	—	91	—	Deadwing
"Harridan"	2021	—	—	—	—	Closure/Continuation
"Of the New Day"	2022	—	—	—	—	Closure/Continuation
"Herd Culling"	2022	—	—	—	—	Closure/Continuation
"Rats Return"	2022	—	—	—	—	Closure/Continuation
"—" denotes a recording that did not chart or was not released in that territory.

== Promotional singles ==
Title	Year	Album
"The Rest Will Flow"	2000	Lightbulb Sun
"Blackest Eyes"	2003	In Absentia
"Trains"	2003	In Absentia
"The Sound of Muzak"	2003	In Absentia
"So Called Friend"/"Half Light"	2006	Deadwing
"Fear of a Blank Planet"	2007	Fear of a Blank Planet
"Way Out of Here"	2007	Fear of a Blank Planet
"Normal"	2007	Nil Recurring
"Time Flies"	2009	The Incident
"Bonnie the Cat"	2010	The Incident

== Videos ==
=== Video albums ===
Title	Video details	Peak chart positions			Sales	Certifications
Title	Video details	FIN	SWE	NLD	Sales	Certifications
Arriving Somewhere...^{[e]}	Released: 21 August 2006; Label: Snapper/Kscope; Format: DVD	4	8	19		
Anesthetize^{[f]}	Released: 20 May 2010; Label: Kscope, Roadrunner Records; Format: DVD, Blu-ray	1	16	—	CAN: 5,000+	CAN: Gold
Closure/Continuation.Live^{[g]}	Released: 8 December 2023; Label: Music for Nations, Sony Music; Format: DVD, Blu-ray	—	—	—		
"—" denotes a recording that did not chart or was not released in that territory.

=== Music videos ===
Year	Title	Directed	Album
1999	"Piano Lessons"	Mike Bennion	Stupid Dream
2002	"Strip the Soul"		In Absentia
2002	"Wedding Nails"	Lasse Hoile	In Absentia
2003	"Blackest Eyes"	Lasse Hoile	In Absentia
2005	"Lazarus"	Lasse Hoile	Deadwing
2007	"Fear of a Blank Planet"	Lasse Hoile	Fear of a Blank Planet
2007	"Way Out of Here"	Lasse Hoile	Fear of a Blank Planet
2008	"Normal"	Lasse Hoile	Nil Recurring
2009	"Time Flies"	Lasse Hoile	The Incident
2010	"Bonnie the Cat"	Przemyslaw Vshebor	The Incident
2022	"Rats Return"	Ricky Allen	Closure/Continuation
2022	"Herd Culling"	Miles Skarin	Closure/Continuation

== Notes ==
a. "The Cross" which appeared on the original CD edition was replaced by the track "Out" (from 1987) on the vinyl edition. The version of "Radioactive Toy" here is the original cassette version as opposed to the re-recorded and extended version on On the Sunday of Life.... "Mute" is a newer mix to the one on the cassette. "An Empty Box" had not appeared on either cassette but is another recording from the same period. Note that the vinyl edition corrects some factual errors and therefore dates some of the material back to 1984.
b. Most of these tracks appeared either on the album On the Sunday of Life... or the limited edition CD Yellow Hedgerow Dreamscape. However, for the CD issue tracks 3 and 4/5 were retitled "Third Eye Surfer" and "On the Sunday of Life..." respectively. Also the version of "Mute" here is an earlier mix.
c. 40-minute tape private pressing of only 10 copies. Contains 7 tracks later to appear on The Nostalgia Factory, plus "Out" (later included on the vinyl edition of Yellow Hedgerow Dreamscape) and the elsewhere unavailable "It Will Rain for a Million Years" (a completely different track to the one with the same title included on On the Sunday of Life...)
d. Most of these tracks appeared either on the album On the Sunday of Life... or the limited edition CD Yellow Hedgerow Dreamscape. "Colours Dance Angels Kiss" and "Hokey Cokey" were later retitled "Track 11" and "Execution of the Will of the Marquis de Sade" respectively. "The Nostalgia Factory" is an earlier version to that on On the Sunday of Life... and "Queen Quotes Crowley" and "This Long Silence" are both about a minute longer than the versions later released on CD. An edit of the track "Sinatra Rape Scene" appears on Up the Downstair as "Monuments Burn into Moments".
e. Full show from the Deadwing tour filmed at Park West, Chicago in October 2005, edited by Lasse Hoile, with the soundtrack mixed in stereo and 5.1 surround sound, live performances of "Futile" and "Radioactive Toy" from German TV show Rockpalast, the "Lazarus" promo clip, the live films used during the show for "Start of Something Beautiful", "Halo", and "Mother and Child Divided", Gavin Harrison's "Cymbal Song", and a photo gallery.
f. A special edition has been made available in April, with a regular version following in May. Anesthetize was filmed live over 2 nights in Tilburg, The Netherlands in October 2008, at the end of the Fear of a Blank Planet tour. The 130-minute live film includes a complete performance of the Blank Planet album and 11 other tracks, and was directed and edited by Lasse Hoile on high definition cameras, with the soundtrack mixed into stereo and 5.1 sound. The special edition was released in the form of a cloth bound hard back 120-page book (as per The Incident and Insurgentes deluxe versions) featuring live photography of the band taken over the last 5 years. The book includes both a DVD and a much higher quality Blu-ray disc version of the film, as well as 2 audio CDs of the soundtrack including one bonus track not featured in the film. The book and audio CDs are not included with the standard retail versions of the Blu-ray/DVD.
g. Full show of 21 songs from Closure/Continuation tour, filmed at Ziggo Dome in Amsterdam, Netherlands in November 2022. Released as three different versions: BD+DVD package featuring 12-page booklet, limited 4LP clear vinyl box set, and a deluxe BD+DVD box set featuring 60-page book and concert's audio on 2 CDs.
