= Coma Divine – Recorded Live in Rome =

Coma Divine
- Cover art by John Blackford

Live album by Porcupine Tree
- Released: 20 October 1997
- Recorded: 25–27 March 1997
- Venue: Frontiera (Rome)
- Genre: Progressive rock
- Length: 78:06 (original album); 100:51 (expanded and remastered edition)
- Labels: CD: Delerium, Snapper; Vinyl: Headspin

Porcupine Tree chronology
Signify (1996)	Coma Divine (1997)	Metanoia (1998)

2004 Reissue
- Digipack reissue on Snapper; Cover art by Lasse Hoile

Coma Divine – Recorded Live in Rome or just Coma Divine, is a live album by the British progressive rock band Porcupine Tree, first released in October 1997. It was expanded to a double album in 2003, adding the three tracks from the promotional single Coma Divine II (1999), and one more previously unreleased out-take. The expanded edition was also released on vinyl containing three LPs, plus a bonus 7-inch single with two demo versions of the song "Disappear" (later included on the compilation album The Sound of No One Listening in 2020; a newer version was included on the "Four Chords That Made a Million" single in 2000 and the compilation Recordings in 2001). The album was reworked as a digipack from the Snapper label in 2004.

== Recording ==
The band recorded three shows at the Frontiera in Rome (on 25, 26 and 27 March 1997) for the purpose of this release; however, only recordings from the second and third night were used, as the recordings from the first concert were flawed with technical problems. A vast amount of material had been performed during the shows, but the band eventually decided to release only the best performances on a single CD. While later the album was reissued as a double CD featuring an extra 25 minutes of music, there are still other unreleased performances from the show, featuring both original phases of "Voyage 34," "Dark Matter," "Burning Sky," "Stars Die," "Idiot Prayer," "The Nostalgia Factory," "Nine Cats," the first performances of "Every Home is Wired," and an instrumental called "Cryogenics" written especially to feature on the album; it was ultimately dropped. Several of these recordings were later released on the 2020 EP Coma: Coda (Rome 1997), made available through the official Porcupine Tree Bandcamp page.

Although essentially a live record, Coma Divine features studio overdubs of the vocals, as the original takes were too poor both in terms of performance and the quality of recording.

== Track listing ==
=== Original release ===
All songs written by Steven Wilson unless otherwise noted.

Original Release
No.	Title	Writer(s)	Studio album	Length
1.	"Bornlivedieintro"	Richard Barbieri, Wilson	Signify, 1996	1:23
2.	"Signify"		Signify	5:52
3.	"Waiting (Phase One)"		Signify	4:32
4.	"Waiting (Phase Two)"		Signify	5:28
5.	"The Sky Moves Sideways"		The Sky Moves Sideways, 1995	12:38
6.	"Dislocated Day"		The Sky Moves Sideways	6:37
7.	"The Sleep of No Dreaming"		Signify	5:18
8.	"Moonloop"	Wilson, Ricky Edwards, Colin Edwin, Chris Maitland	The Sky Moves Sideways	11:40
9.	"Radioactive Toy"		On the Sunday of Life, 1992	15:26
10.	"Not Beautiful Anymore"		Up the Downstair, 1993	9:43
Total length:				78:37

There were various technical problems with the original CD edition due to its extreme length, and later pressings had about two minutes of audience noise removed between tracks to try to solve the problem.

=== Expanded edition ===
All songs written by Steven Wilson unless otherwise noted.

Disc One
No.	Title	Writer(s)	Studio album	Length
1.	"Bornlivedieintro"	Barbieri, Wilson	Signify, 1996	1:23
2.	"Signify"		Signify	5:52
3.	"Waiting (Phase One)"		Signify	4:32
4.	"Waiting (Phase Two)"		Signify	5:28
5.	"The Sky Moves Sideways"		The Sky Moves Sideways, 1995	12:38
6.	"Dislocated Day"		The Sky Moves Sideways	6:37
7.	"The Sleep of No Dreaming"		Signify	5:18
8.	"Moonloop"	Wilson, Edwards, Edwin, Maitland	The Sky Moves Sideways	11:40

Disc Two
No.	Title	Studio album	Length
1.	"Up The Downstair" (*)	Up the Downstair, 1993	7:40
2.	"The Moon Touches Your Shoulder" (*)	The Sky Moves Sideways	5:05
3.	"Always Never" (*)	Up the Downstair	4:51
4.	"Is...Not" (previously unreleased)	The Sky Moves Sideways	6:09
5.	"Radioactive Toy"	On the Sunday of Life..., 1992	13:32
6.	"Not Beautiful Anymore"	Up the Downstair	9:43
Total length:			100:28

(*) N.B. Originally released on the Coma Divine II EP in 1999.

== Musicians ==
- Steven Wilson – guitars, vocals
- Richard Barbieri – synthesizers
- Colin Edwin – bass guitar
- Chris Maitland – drums, percussion, harmony vocals

== Reviews ==
Professional ratings
Review scores
Source	Rating
DPRP	8.5/10 stars

Professional reviews:

- Metal Hammer – Captured live in Rome, they reinforce both their ability and their charm through the likes of 'Moonloop' and 'The Sky Moves Sideways', lengthy but not overdone pieces, led as ever by Steve Wilson's intriguing vision. Admittedly, it'll make them few friends (live albums never do), but it's essential listening for the faithful.
