= We Lost the Skyline =

Live album by Porcupine Tree
- Released: CD: 18 February 2008; Vinyl: 18 March 2008
- Recorded: 4 October 2007
- Genres: Progressive rock, progressive metal
- Length: 33:32
- Labels: Transmission (CD); Tonefloat (Vinyl)

Porcupine Tree chronology
Nil Recurring (2007)	We Lost the Skyline (2008)	Ilosaarirock (2009)

Professional ratings
Review scores
Source	Rating
Blogcritics	(positive)
DPRP	(8/10)
Sputnikmusic	4/5 stars

We Lost the Skyline (also known as Transmission 7.1) is a live recording by Porcupine Tree, recorded during an in-store performance at Park Avenue CDs in Orlando, Florida on 4 October 2007, with 200 fans in attendance. Although it was originally planned that the full band would play, lack of space dictated that only the two guitarists/singers Steven Wilson and John Wesley did. This one-off performance was captured by a remote recording facility and the complete eight song, 33 minute show is now being released in a mail order only CD, but the band are currently negotiating a low-key release for the CD through a number of independent stores in the USA that have supported Porcupine Tree over the last few years (including Park Avenue CDs itself). However, the CD was released in Poland in small quantity.

The album originally came in a digipack sleeve created by photographer Lasse Hoile and designer Carl Glover.

Dutch vinyl specialists Tonefloat also released a quality 180gm vinyl edition of We Lost the Skyline in a gatefold sleeve, with a limited and numbered edition of 1,000 copies on marbled vinyl, and a regular edition on black vinyl. The Porcupine Tree store also stocks the vinyl editions.

On 25 January 2008, "Lazarus" was made available to listen through the band's Myspace.

The track "Normal" was made available, a few weeks prior to the release of the album, exclusively to Porcupine Tree fan club members.

On 18 February 2008 We Lost the Skyline was released on CD. The vinyl versions were released on 18 March 2008.

The CD was also made available to order through Park Ave CDs (the venue where the recording took place). This version of the CD came with an exclusive poster commemorating the in-store event (poster limited to 300). This version was released on 26 February 2008.

Since 14 June 2008, the album was made available for digital download at a very low cost through the band's online store, whether in MP3 or FLAC formats, including printable artwork.

== Track listing ==
Side one
No.	Title	From	Length
1.	"The Sky Moves Sideways"	The Sky Moves Sideways	4:02
2.	"Even Less"	Stupid Dream	3:27
3.	"Stars Die"	The Sky Moves Sideways	4:33
4.	"Waiting"	Signify	3:52

Side two
No.	Title	From	Length
5.	"Normal"	Nil Recurring EP	4:52
6.	"Drown with Me"	In Absentia (European edition)	4:09
7.	"Lazarus"	Deadwing	4:29
8.	"Trains"	In Absentia	4:04

== Personnel ==
- Steven Wilson – acoustic and electric guitar, vocals
- John Wesley (tracks 4–8) – electric guitar, backing vocals
- Darren Schneider – engineer
- Joe Jachino, Shane Fitzgerald, Tyler Tapp, Michael Escobar, Stephen Spencer – assistant engineers
- Matt Gorney – producer

== Charts ==
Chart performance for We Lost the Skyline
Chart (2026)	Peak position
Scottish Albums (Official Charts)	49
UK Albums Sales (OCC)	67
UK Rock & Metal Albums (Official Charts)	5
