= Transmission IV =

2001 EP by Porcupine Tree

EP by Porcupine Tree
- Released: December 2001
- Recorded: 28 June 1994
- Studios: The Doghouse, Henley-on-Thames, England
- Genres: Progressive rock, psychedelic rock, space rock
- Length: 40:07
- Label: Delerium

Porcupine Tree chronology
Recordings (2001)	Transmission IV (2001)	In Absentia (2002)

Transmission IV is the fourth and final Transmission information service release (only available to subscribers) by British progressive rock band Porcupine Tree. It contains a complete improvisation of what would become the song "Moonloop", included on the 1995 release The Sky Moves Sideways.

The 2006 reissue is an exact reproduction of the originally issued fan club edition, which was released 2001 and was limited to 500 copies. The reissue has also been remastered by Steven Wilson.

== Track listing ==
No.	Title	Writer(s)	Length
1.	"Moonloop (Unedited improvisation)"	Steven Wilson, Colin Edwin, Chris Maitland, Rick Edwards	40:07

== Band ==
- Colin Edwin – bass guitar
- Chris Maitland – drums
- Steven Wilson – guitar, keyboards, samples

== Guest musicians ==
- Markus Butler – harmonica
- Rick Edwards – percussion
