= Ilosaarirock (album) =

Live album by Porcupine Tree
- Released: March 2009
- Recorded: 14 July 2007
- Venue: Ilosaarirock Festival (Joensuu)
- Genre: Progressive rock, progressive metal
- Length: 73:42
- Label: Transmission

Porcupine Tree chronology
We Lost the Skyline (2008)	Ilosaarirock (2009)	Atlanta (2010)

Ilosaarirock (also known as Transmission 10.1) is a live album by British progressive rock band Porcupine Tree, released in March 2009. It was sent out only to members of the "Residents of a Blank Planet" ticketing club and is not commercially available. It was recorded at the Ilosaarirock Festival in Finland on 14 July 2007, and is considered by the band to be one of the best concerts from the "Tour of a Blank Planet". It includes the band's complete performance remixed from the multitrack recording made by national Finnish radio. Although it contains a few familiar favorites, most of the concert consists of tracks from Fear of a Blank Planet. This was the first time that live versions of the Fear of a Blank Planet songs have been officially released. Due to a fault with the mastering on the first manufacturing run, a corrected replacement CD was also included inside the package.

== Track listing ==
All tracks are written by Steven Wilson, expect otherwise noted.

No.	Title	Writer(s)	Length
1.	"Intro"		2:02
2.	"Fear of a Blank Planet" (from Fear of a Blank Planet)		7:32
3.	"Lightbulb Sun" (from Lightbulb Sun)		6:04
4.	"Open Car" (from Deadwing)		5:35
5.	"Anesthetize" (from Fear of a Blank Planet)		17:23
6.	"Blackest Eyes" (from In Absentia)		5:18
7.	"Way Out of Here" (from Fear of a Blank Planet)	Barbieri, Edwin, Harrison, Wilson	7:43
8.	"Sleep Together" (from Fear of a Blank Planet)		8:53
9.	"Trains" (from In Absentia)		5:59
10.	"Halo" (from Deadwing)	Barbieri, Edwin, Harrison, Wilson	7:17
Total length:			73:46

== Personnel ==
- Steven Wilson – vocals, guitar, piano, mixing
- Richard Barbieri – keyboards, synthesizer
- Colin Edwin – bass guitar
- Gavin Harrison – drums
- John Wesley – guitar, backing vocals (touring member)

== Production ==
- Lasse Hoile – cover photography
- Carl Glover – cover design
