= Moonloop =

EP by Porcupine Tree
- Released: 17 October 1994
- Recorded: June–July 1994 at No Man's Land and The Doghouse
- Genre: Progressive rock, psychedelic rock, space rock
- Length: 23:01
- Label: Delerium; C+S Records
- Producer: Steven Wilson

Porcupine Tree chronology
Yellow Hedgerow Dreamscape (1994)	Moonloop (1994)	Staircase Infinities (1994)

Professional ratings
Review scores
Source	Rating
Allmusic	3/5 stars

Moonloop is an EP released by British psychedelic rock and progressive rock band Porcupine Tree, prior to the release of their third studio album, The Sky Moves Sideways. It was released on vinyl and CD in the UK by Delerium Records.

The EP was also released by C+S Records in the United States under the name of Stars Die and included the song "Always Never" from the Up the Downstair album as an extra track.

"Stars Die" was not included on the original UK release of The Sky Moves Sideways but was included on the US version. The 2CD reissues of The Sky Moves Sideways have the track on the second disc.

The artwork used on the cover of the EP was later used on a compilation album by the band titled Stars Die: The Delerium Years 1991–1997.

== Track listing ==
=== CD - UK Delerium - (CD DELEC CDS032) ===
1. "Stars Die" – 4:57
2. "Moonloop" – 18:04

=== Vinyl - UK Delerium - (EP032) ===
==== Side A ====
1. "Stars Die" – 4:57

==== Side B ====
1. "Moonloop" – 18:04

=== US CD - US C&S Records - (CS2024-2) (titled as "Stars Die") ===
1. "Stars Die" – 4:57
2. "Moonloop" (Version) – 18:04
3. "Always Never" – 6:58

== Personnel ==
- Steven Wilson - Vocals, guitars, keyboards, mixing
- Colin Edwin - Bass
- Chris Maitland - Drums
- Rick Edwards - Percussion
