= XM (album) =

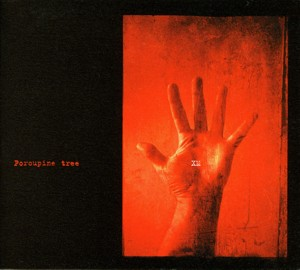

Live album by Porcupine Tree
- Released: July 2003
- Recorded: 12 November 2002 at Satellite Radio, Washington D.C.
- Genres: Progressive rock, progressive metal
- Length: 52:07
- Label: Transmission

Porcupine Tree chronology
| In Absentia (2002) | XM (2003) | Warszawa (2004) |

XM (also known as Transmission 1.1 and Transmission 1.2) is a live-in-studio album recorded by British band Porcupine Tree in late 2002 as a live album of mostly In Absentia tracks. This was taken from a session at XM Satellite Radio in Washington, D.C., on 12 November 2002, and was originally released as a limited edition tour album. It was later released online on the Porcupine Tree store.

== Track listing ==
| No. | Title | Writer(s) | Length |
|---|---|---|---|
| 1. | "Blackest Eyes" (from In Absentia) | Steven Wilson | 4:26 |
| 2. | "The Sound of Muzak" (from In Absentia) | Wilson | 5:02 |
| 3. | "Gravity Eyelids" (from In Absentia) | Wilson | 7:30 |
| 4. | "Wedding Nails" (from In Absentia) | Richard Barbieri, Wilson | 5:17 |
| 5. | "Even Less/Slave Called Shiver" (from Stupid Dream) | Wilson | 11:38 |
| 6. | "Heartattack in a Layby" (from In Absentia) | Wilson | 4:16 |
| 7. | "Strip the Soul" (from In Absentia) | Colin Edwin, Wilson | 7:06 |
| 8. | "Tinto Brass" (from Stupid Dream) | Barbieri, Edwin, Chris Maitland, Wilson | 6:38 |

== Band ==
- Steven Wilson – Guitars and vocals
- Colin Edwin – Bass
- Richard Barbieri – Keyboards and synthesizers
- Gavin Harrison – Drums
- John Wesley – Guitars and backing vocals (except "Slave Called Shiver" and "Tinto Brass")

== Credits ==
- XM Recording Engineer – Quinton Roebuck
- XM Recording Assistant – Aaron Lee
- Mixing – Steven Wilson (at No Man's Land, UK, December 2002)
- Crew – Ian Bond, Pete Dempsey, Mick Pryde, Ross Elliot, Michael Piper
- Cover photography – Lasse Hoile
- Band photography – Francesca Petrangeli
- Gavin Harrison photography – Oliver Link
- John Wesley photography – Jason Birnie
- Cover design – Carl Glover (for Aleph)

== Notes ==
Features five piece touring line up including special guest John Wesley on guitar and backing vocals.
UK Transmission – 1.1 (limited to 1,500, released for the US tour July–August 2003)
UK Transmission – 1.2 (limited to 1,000, released for the EU tour November 2003)
