= Spiral Circus =

Live album by Porcupine Tree
- Released: Cassette: April 1994; Vinyl: February 1997
- Recorded: 4 December 1993; 6 December 1993; 7 December 1993
- Genres: Progressive rock, psychedelic rock, space rock
- Length: 49:13
- Labels: Cassette: Delerium; Vinyl: Chromatic

Porcupine Tree chronology
Up the Downstair (1993)	Spiral Circus (1994)	The Sky Moves Sideways (1995)

Vinyl Edition
- Vinyl reissue on Chromatic

Spiral Circus is the name of the first live album by British psychedelic rock/progressive rock band Porcupine Tree from their first tour. The tracks were recorded directly from the mixing desk in three locations of England during December 1993. The first half of the album was taken from the shows in the BBC and The Borderline, London, and the second half from The Nag's Head, High Wycombe.

Spiral Circus was first released in 1994 on cassette only. This tape was given away free to subscribers of the Transmission information service. It was then reissued on vinyl in 1997 limited to 500 copies. Both editions are deleted at the present.

Despite the fact that the track is not included, the album name is a reference to a section in the song "The Sky Moves Sideways Phase 1" from The Sky Moves Sideways.

== Track listing ==
=== Side A ===
1. "Burning Sky" – BBC / Borderline, London (11:02)
2. "Voyage 34" – Borderline, London (5:32)
3. "Always Never" – BBC (6:28)

=== Side B ===
1. "Radioactive Toy" – High Wycombe (9:58)
2. "Up the Downstair" – High Wycombe (7:15)
3. "Not Beautiful Anymore" – High Wycombe (8:58)

== Personnel ==
- Steven Wilson – guitar, vocals
- Richard Barbieri – keyboards, electronics
- Colin Edwin – bass
- Chris Maitland – drums, backing vocals
