= Waiting (Porcupine Tree song) =

Single by Porcupine Tree

from the album Signify
- Released: 29 April 1996
- Genre: Progressive rock
- Length: 4:27
- Label: Delerium
- Composer(s): Steven Wilson

Porcupine Tree singles chronology
"'Voyage 34'" (1992)	"Waiting" (1996)	"'Piano Lessons'" (1999)

"Waiting" is the first single by British progressive rock band Porcupine Tree, released in April 1996. It came in two formats: a regular CD and a 12" vinyl. At the time, the single was intended to promote the forthcoming album Signify. The song is divided into two parts, the second one being an instrumental follow-up.

Waiting is considered the first Porcupine Tree single for its length, since Voyage 34 and Voyage 34: Remixes are singles of around 30 and 40 minutes respectively that would fit better in the category of EPs.

Porcupine Tree contributed an edit of "Waiting (Phase Two)" to the soundtrack for Paul Spurrier's movie Underground, whereas the credits erroneously listed "Waiting (Phase One)".

== Track listing ==
=== CD Version ===
1. "Waiting (Phase One)" - 4:27
2. "Waiting (Phase Two)" - 6:19
3. "The Sound of No-One Listening" - 8:20

=== 12" vinyl ===
Side A

1. "Waiting (Phase One)" 4:27
2. "Waiting (Phase Two)" 6:25

Side B

1. "Colourflow in Mind" 3:52
2. "Fuse the Sky" 4:34

=== Promo CD version ===
1. "Waiting (Phase One)" - 4:27
2. "Waiting (Phase Two)" - 6:19
3. "Rainy Taxi" - 6:45

C+S pressed a few hundred copies of this three track CD single to promote their subsequently withdrawn release of the "Signify" album. The third track is taken from the "Staircase Infinities" mini album.

== Notes ==
"Waiting (Phase One)" and "Waiting (Phase Two)" both appeared on the album Signify. "The Sound of No-One Listening", "Colourflow in Mind" and "Fuse the Sky" were subsequently released on the compilation album Stars Die (with the first one being remixed).
