= Signify (album) =

Studio album by Porcupine Tree
- Released: 30 September 1996
- Recorded: 1995–1996
- Studios: No Man's Land (Hemel Hempstead, Hertfordshire, England), The Doghouse (Henley-on-Thames, England), Katrina & the Waves' Studio (Cambridge, England)
- Genres: Progressive rock, krautrock
- Length: 61:56
- Label: Delerium
- Producer: Steven Wilson

Porcupine Tree chronology
The Sky Moves Sideways (1995)	Signify (1996)	Coma Divine – Recorded Live in Rome (1997)

Singles from Signify
- 1. "Waiting" Released: 29 April 1996

Signify is the fourth album by the British progressive rock band Porcupine Tree. The band's only krautrock-styled project, it was released in September 1996 and later re-issued in 2003 with a second disc of demos, which had previously been released on the B-side cassette tape Insignificance, and a third time, on vinyl, on 9 May 2011. It was the first album that frontman Steven Wilson recorded with the band on board from the beginning; previous albums had been essentially solo efforts with occasional help from other musicians.

== Background ==
=== Writing and recording ===
Signify was the first Porcupine Tree album recorded as a full band unit, rather than primarily by frontman Steven Wilson with occasional assistance from other musicians, primarily the ones who would become full-time band members as of this album; Richard Barbieri, Colin Edwin, and Chris Maitland. In 1995, the band would alternate between touring in support of their last release, The Sky Moves Sideways, and writing and recording the album, with Wilson describing it as "The album was recorded in quite a piecemeal way with tracks written and recorded in batches of 2 or 3, followed by gaps of up to 3 months." As such, a number of the songs, albeit in early forms, were debuted live before the album's release.

Edwin would admit that while Wilson allowed him a lot of freedom with his bass parts, sometimes Wilson would simply replace his demo takes with Wilson's own work on the final version, as was the case with the tracks "Sever" and "Dark Matter". Barbieri's goals for his contributions during the Signify sessions were "...to use what in isolation would be a weird and abstract sound or texture and to make it work in the context of a pop song".

Wilson said of the recording process:

"Signify was slightly odd in the way it was recorded in the sense that although it is a band album, because we were never able to actually all be in the same room at the same time, because of physical limitations, with the exception of one track, "Intermediate Jesus", which was done outside, I tended to demo the tracks to a fairly high level and they would just replace the parts that I'd played on synthesizers with the real thing. So there wasn't a great deal of input from the other guys."

=== Sound ===
In addition to the change in sound coming from it being the first collaborative, full band album as a whole, the album marked a transition in genre as well. The band's first three albums were characterized as being psychedelic rock and experimental space rock. This album still retains these qualities, but at the same time, moves closer to a more structured, radio-friendly and commercial sound, a style of progressive rock that the band explored in a much stronger way in the band's subsequent albums Stupid Dream and Lightbulb Sun. The album has been described as "...the end of an era, while simultaneously ushering in the dawn of a new age...It contains sprawling, vague instrumental tunes as well as more straightforward, cleverly written songs with a clear-cut song structure. A precursor to Stupid Dream and an epilogue to Porcupine Tree's psychedelic past." PopMatters later reflected that the album would become to be known as the band's krautrock album.

== Song details ==
The title track of the album, "Signify", actually originated as a demo cover version of a song by the krautrock band Neu! titled "Hallogallo", but upon the band experimenting, evolved into an original song. The album was originally supposed to end with the track "Signify II", but was later trimmed off to shorten the album's overall run-time. The song is still based on the riff from the title track and "Hallogallo", but is less raw, has different segments, and extends to an almost doubled length. It would be released eventually under the compilation album Stars Die: The Delerium Years 1991-1997, and parts of it would be played live in conjunction with the title track, such as is shown on the live album Coma Divine.

The track "Every Home is Wired" reflect Wilson's attitude toward the internet at the time, while the track "Dark Matter" was in reference to the dark side of touring in support of album releases. "Every Home is Wired" consists of 37 separate overdubbed vocal tracks. The track "Light Mass Prayers" was written by drummer Chris Maitland and actually features no drumming at all. Demo versions of the tracks "Signify", "Waiting", "Sever" and "Dark Matter" were all included on the b-side and demo compilation album Insignificance, the latter under the title "Sever Tomorrow" and "Dark Origins". Another demo from the era, "Wake as Gun," would ultimately be reused in Wilson's other project, No-Man, for the song "Jack the Sax" (from the 1997 EP Dry Cleaning Ray); in another connection between the bands, the interlude track "Pagan" on Signify uses the same operatic sample previously used in the ending of "Colours" from No-Man's Lovesighs – An Entertainment.

== Reception ==
Professional ratings
Review scores
Source	Rating
AllMusic	4/5 stars
Sputnikmusic	5/5 stars

Reception for the album has been mostly positive. Sputnikmusic gave Signify five out of five stars, applauding the album as "a masterpiece in modern psychedelia", writing that it "exudes a raw feeling of musical passion and pure trippy atmosphere: the soaring, expertly written vocal harmonies, engulfing instrumental pieces, unsettling samples, and puzzling abstract lyrics."

AllMusic gave the album four out of five stars, praising the album as "... the next great step forward for Porcupine Tree, a distinct advancement in how well the foursome could completely rock out as well as find its own narcotic style of ambient exploration...For all that Wilson may once again be singing obliquely on the pressures and nature of end-of-century life, he still does so in an engagingly left-of-center way."

== Track listing ==
No.	Title	Lyrics	Music	Length
1.	"Bornlivedie"		Wilson, Barbieri	1:41
2.	"Signify (instrumental)"		Wilson	3:26
3.	"Sleep of No Dreaming"	Wilson	Wilson	5:24
4.	"Pagan"		Wilson	1:34
5.	"Waiting (Phase One)"	Wilson	Wilson	4:24
6.	"Waiting (Phase Two)"		Wilson	6:15
7.	"Sever"	Wilson	Wilson	5:30
8.	"Idiot Prayer"		Wilson, Edwin	7:37
9.	"Every Home Is Wired"	Wilson	Wilson	5:08
10.	"Intermediate Jesus"		Wilson, Barbieri, Edwin, Maitland	7:29
11.	"Light Mass Prayers"		Maitland	4:28
12.	"Dark Matter" (song ends at 8:10; after 30 seconds a hidden track plays)	Wilson	Wilson	8:54
Total length:				61:56

=== Insignificance and second disc ===
In 1997, a collection of b-sides and demos from the Signify sessions, titled Insignificance, was released on cassette tape. When Signify was reissued in 2003 on Delerium Records and in 2004 on Snapper Music, Insignificance was packaged as a second disc of Signify, with a slightly altered track list. The later re-releases do not contain the tracks "Door to the River" or "Insignificance", as they were included with the rest of the full band tracks on Metanoia. Still, the compilation retains ten tracks through the inclusion of the track "Dark Origins" and the indexing of Hallogallo/Signify into two separate tracks (despite still running continuously from one to the other).

Track	1997 cassette tape	2003–04 Signify 2nd CD reissue
1	"Wake As Gun 1" – 3:24	"Wake As Gun 1" – 3:29
2	"Hallogallo/Signify " – 6:53	"Hallogallo" – 3:37
3	"Waiting" – 6:45	"Signify" – 3:28
4	"Smiling Not Smiling" – 3:40	"Waiting" – 6:56
5	"Wake As Gun 2" – 3:42	"Smiling Not Smiling" – 3:49
6	"Neural Rust" – 5:47	"Wake As Gun 2" – 2:06
7	"Sever Tomorrow" – 6:01	"Neural Rust" – 5:53
8	"Door to the River" – 4:17	"Dark Origins" – 6:54
9	"Insignificance" – 4:54	"Sever Tomorrow" – 6:04
10	"Nine Cats" (acoustic version) – 4:03	"Nine Cats" (acoustic version) – 4:08

=== Other tracks ===
B-sides from the era, including "The Sound of No-One Listening" (from the "Waiting" single and the original vinyl pressing of Signify) and "Fuse the Sky" (a remix of the title track from The Sky Moves Sideways released on an ambient compilation) appear in addition to the aforementioned "Signify II" and "Colourflow in Mind" (an album outtake) on the compilation album Stars Die: The Delerium Years 1991–1997.

Additionally, an album of studio improvisations from that period, called Metanoia, was released in 1998. The improvisational sessions contained both previously unreleased material and material that was shaped into previously released songs; a track called "Metanoia I/Intermediate Jesus", an over 14-minute long freeform jam, was edited down to serve as the main backing track for the song "Intermediate Jesus". The tracks "Door to the River" and "Insignificance" are also from these sessions and included on the release, likely the reason why they were removed from future versions of Insignificance.

The album notes of Insignificance has Wilson making references to a never recorded track called "Cryogenics". It was based on "Mesmer I" from Metanoia (it also contained part of "Wake as Gun") and was performed live by the band once in 1995. A shorter version of the song was played during the Italian Tour in early 1997. It was recorded in Rome (with other material used to compile Coma Divine live album) but never mixed or released properly as the band weren't happy with the performance. The live recording of "Cryogenics" was later restored and released on 2020's EP Coma: Coda (Rome 1997) which made available through the official Porcupine Tree Bandcamp page.

== Personnel ==
Band

- Steven Wilson – guitars, piano, organ, mellotron, samples, tapes, banshee guitar, drum programming, chimes, musical boxes, vocals
- Richard Barbieri – synthesisers, Hammond organ, Prophet V/System 700 electronics, piano, tapes, texture, sequencers
- Colin Edwin – electric bass, double bass
- Chris Maitland – drums, cymbals, percussion, vocal harmonies on "Waiting Phase 1" and "Sever", drum loops, keyboards and voices on "Light Mass Prayers"

Additional

- Terumi – voices (track 1)
- Produced and mixed by Steven Wilson.
- Mastered by Chris Thorpe at Serendipity
- Art & Design by John Blackford.
