= On the Sunday of Life... =

Studio album by Porcupine Tree
- Released: 21 April 1992
- Recorded: 1988–1991
- Studios: No Man's Land (Hemel Hempstead, Hertfordshire, England)
- Genres: Progressive rock; psychedelic rock; space rock
- Length: 75:47
- Label: Delerium
- Producer: Steven Wilson

Porcupine Tree chronology
The Nostalgia Factory (1991)	On the Sunday of Life... (1992)	Up the Downstair (1993)

Professional ratings
Review scores
Source	Rating
AllMusic	3/5 stars

On the Sunday of Life... is the debut album of English progressive rock band Porcupine Tree, first released on 21 April 1992. It compiles tracks that Steven Wilson produced and recorded for two cassette-only releases, Tarquin's Seaweed Farm (1989) and The Nostalgia Factory (1991). The rest of the music from these tapes was released three years later in the compilation album Yellow Hedgerow Dreamscape.

Most of the lyrics were written by Alan Duffy, a school friend with whom Steven Wilson had lost touch a few years before the album was released. The album title was chosen from a long list of nonsense titles compiled by Richard Allen of Delerium. The song "Nine Cats" dates back to at least 1983, originally being recorded by Karma, a band Wilson had played in during that time, and released on the band's EP The Joke's on You.

A small run of 1,000 copies in a deluxe gatefold sleeve was released in early 1992. The album, over time, eventually sold in excess of 20,000 copies.

The version of "Radioactive Toy" that featured on the album is re-recorded. The original version was later released on Yellow Hedgerow Dreamscape. In addition, the original versions of "The Nostalgia Factory", "Queen Quotes Crowley", and "This Long Silence" are about a minute shorter on this album.

== Track listing ==
Credits adapted from the liner notes of On the Sunday of Life....

Part 1: First Love
No.	Title	Writer(s)	Length
1.	"Music for the Head"	Steven Wilson	2:42
2.	"Jupiter Island"	Wilson; Alan Duffy	6:12
3.	"Third Eye Surfer"	Wilson; John Marshall	2:50
4.	"On the Sunday of Life..."	Wilson	2:07
5.	"The Nostalgia Factory"	Wilson; Duffy	7:28

Part 2: Second Sight
No.	Title	Writer(s)	Length
6.	"Space Transmission"	Wilson	2:59
7.	"Message from a Self-Destructing Turnip"	Wilson	0:27
8.	"Radioactive Toy"	Wilson	10:00
9.	"Nine Cats"	Wilson; Duffy	3:53

Part 3: Third Eye
No.	Title	Writer(s)	Length
10.	"Hymn"	Wilson	1:14
11.	"Footprints"	Wilson; Duffy	5:56
12.	"Linton Samuel Dawson"	Wilson; Duffy	3:04
13.	"And the Swallows Dance Above the Sun"	Wilson; Duffy	4:05
14.	"Queen Quotes Crowley"	Wilson	3:48

Part 4: Fourth Bridge
No.	Title	Writer(s)	Length
15.	"No Luck with Rabbits"	Wilson	0:46
16.	"Begonia Seduction Scene"	Wilson	2:14
17.	"This Long Silence"	Wilson; Duffy	5:05
18.	"It Will Rain for a Million Years"	Wilson; Duffy	10:51

== Personnel ==
=== Porcupine Tree ===
- Steven Wilson – vocals, guitars; bass, keyboards, flute, drums programming, soundscapes, samples, treatments

=== Additional personnel ===
- John Marshall – sampled drums on "Third Eye Surfer"
- Solomon St. Jemain – additional guitar & voice on "Queen Quotes Crowley"
- Master Timothy Masters – oboe
