= The Sky Moves Sideways =

Studio album by Porcupine Tree
- Released: 30 January 1995
- Recorded: June 1993 – July 1994
- Genres: Progressive rock, space rock, art rock
- Length: 65:31 (UK version); 59:51 (US version); 109:14 (2003 remaster)
- Label: Delerium
- Producer: Steven Wilson

Porcupine Tree chronology
Up the Downstair (1993)	The Sky Moves Sideways (1995)	Signify (1996)

The Sky Moves Sideways is the third studio album by English progressive rock band Porcupine Tree, first released on 30 January 1995. It was their first album to be released in the US.

The album has been compared to Pink Floyd's Wish You Were Here because of their similar structure: both albums have extended pieces at the beginning and end, which are the halves of a single song.

== Background ==
The Sky Moves Sideways was the first Porcupine Tree album to be released in the US (albeit with an altered track list), and the first on which Porcupine Tree was actually a band rather than simply a pseudonym for Steven Wilson. This transition took place while the album was being recorded, so two of the tracks – namely "The Moon Touches Your Shoulder" and "Dislocated Day" – are performed entirely by Wilson, while the full band appears on the remainder of the album (including "Stars Die", a UK single which was added to the US version of the album). In 2003, a new, two CD version of the album was released, featuring newly recorded drums by Gavin Harrison on these two tracks.

There are three distinct versions of the album – the original UK version, the US version, and the 2003 remaster – none of which features the same track list, or the same version of "Moonloop".

The track "Moonloop" is an edited and overdubbed version of a 40-minute improvisation by the full live band recorded at the Doghouse studio on 28 June 1994; a section unused on the album featured a drum beat that would go on to form the basis of "Stars Die." The full length version was released as Transmission IV in 2001.

Wilson remixed elements of "The Colour of Air" for use in the track "Fuse the Sky" during the Signify era on an ambient compilation; it later appeared on Stars Die: The Delerium Years 1991–1997. The guitar progression of "Spiral Circus" would be reused by Wilson project No-Man for "Something Falls," a b-side from the 1998 Carolina Skeletons single, released before their 2001 album Returning Jesus.

== Release ==
The album was first released on 30 January 1995 in Europe. The album would later be released in North America on 25 September 1995, the first album of the band's to do so. The track list would be changed for the album's American release. Besides the addition of "Stars Die", the different running order and the removal of "Prepare Yourself", the version of "Moonloop" on this edition is less than half the length of the one on the UK release. Additionally, the two parts of the title track on this version have been split into a number of sections.

The album was remastered and re-released as a two disc collection in 2003, including expanded and demo material. The song "The Sky Moves Sideways (Alternate Version)" represents outtakes and a work-in-progress mix of the original vision of the album as a single 34-minute track. The version of "Moonloop" here has three minutes of additional material previously available only on an EP, and is split into two tracks. This is the only version of The Sky Moves Sideways which includes both "Prepare Yourself" and "Stars Die". A triple vinyl edition was also released in the same year, by Headspin Music record label, including a 7-inch single with two versions of the song "Men of Wood", the first was taken from The Sky Moves Sideways recording sessions and the 2000 mix was previously included in the Stars Die: The Delerium Years 1991-1997 compilation.

A double vinyl edition was released in 2012 by Kscope. This vinyl edition features a new "anti-loudness" remaster which is closer to the natural dynamics of the original masters. The track list was the same as the first two LPs of the prior vinyl release, except for a 22-minute version of "Moonloop" on side four.

== Reception ==
Professional ratings
Review scores
Source	Rating
AllMusic	3/5 stars
Record Collector	4/5 stars

The album was generally well received. AllMusic praised it for "continuing the excellence of Up the Downstair while achieving a new liquid sense of drama and overall flow.", specifically praising the track "Stars Die".

Record Collector praised the album for "A dreamy, tranquil and heavily atmospheric effort for the most part, the opus sees the group at their most heavily immersed in Pink Floyd territories"

== Track listing ==
Original European CD release

All lyrics are written by Steven Wilson; all music is composed by Steven Wilson, except "Moonloop", composed by Ricky Edwards, Colin Edwin, Chris Maitland and Steven Wilson.

No.	Title	Length
1.	"The Sky Moves Sideways Phase 1"; I. "The Colour of Air"; II. "I Find That I'm Not There"; III. "Wire the Drum"; IV. "Spiral Circus"	18:37
2.	"Dislocated Day"	5:24
3.	"The Moon Touches Your Shoulder"	5:40
4.	"Prepare Yourself"	1:54
5.	"Moonloop"	17:05
6.	"The Sky Moves Sideways Phase 2"; I. "Is...Not"; II. "Off the Map"	16:46
Total length:		65:31

=== Alternate Versions ===
US release
No.	Title	Length
1.	"The Colour of Air"	4:39
2.	"I Find That I'm Not There"	3:47
3.	"Wire the Drum"	6:18
4.	"Spiral Circus"	3:56
5.	"Stars Die"	5:01
6.	"Moonloop"	8:11
7.	"Dislocated Day"	5:24
8.	"The Moon Touches Your Shoulder"	5:51
9.	"Is...Not"	12:01
10.	"Off the Map"	4:43

2003 Expanded remaster

Disc 1
No.	Title	Length
1.	"The Sky Moves Sideways Phase 1"; I. "The Colour of Air"; II. "I Find That I'm Not There"; III. "Wire the Drum"; IV. "Spiral Circus"	18:37
2.	"Dislocated Day"	5:24
3.	"The Moon Touches Your Shoulder"	5:40
4.	"Prepare Yourself"	1:54
5.	"The Sky Moves Sideways Phase 2"; I. "Is...Not"; II. "Off the Map"	16:46

Disc 2
No.	Title	Length
1.	"The Sky Moves Sideways" (alternate version)	34:42
2.	"Stars Die"	5:01
3.	"Moonloop" (improvisation)	16:18
4.	"Moonloop" (coda)	4:52

== Personnel ==
=== Porcupine Tree ===
- Steven Wilson – vocals, guitar; keyboards, tapes, programming and mix engineer
- Colin Edwin – bass
- Richard Barbieri – keyboards; electronics, programming
- Chris Maitland – drums
- Gavin Harrison – drums on "Dislocated Day" and "Moon Touches Your Shoulder" (2003 expanded remaster only)

=== Production ===
- Markcus Butler – additional recording
- Michael Bennion – art direction

=== Additional musicians ===
- Ricky Edwards – additional percussion
- Theo Travis – flute on "The Sky Moves Sideways Phase 1"
- Suzanne J. Barbieri – vocals on "The Sky Moves Sideways Phase 2"
