= Voyage 34: The Complete Trip =

Compilation album by Porcupine Tree
- Released: 2 November 1992 (single); 6 June 2000 (album)
- Recorded: June 1992 – August 1993
- Genre: Progressive rock
- Length: 70:40
- Labels: Delerium, Snapper

Porcupine Tree chronology
| Lightbulb Sun (2000) | Voyage 34: The Complete Trip (1992) | Recordings (2001) |

Alternative Cover
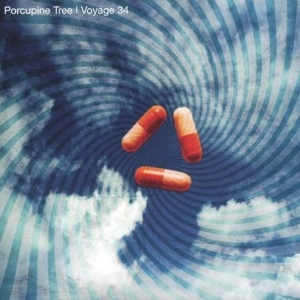
- Cover of the 2004 re-issue designed by Lasse Hoile

Voyage 34: The Complete Trip is a compilation album by the British progressive rock band Porcupine Tree. The individual tracks for the album were recorded in 1992 and 1993, while the album itself was compiled and released in 2000, and then re-issued in 2004.

== Background ==
The album originated from a single track, titled "Voyage 34", which was to be part of Porcupine Tree's second album, Up the Downstair. Originally a 30-minute track intended to be the second disc of a double album, Wilson eventually decided to release "Voyage 34" independently of the rest of the album. It was released in two parts, on a 12-inch single, as "Voyage 34 (Phase 1)" and "Voyage 34 (Phase 2)" in November 1992.

In 1993, Voyage 34: Remixes was released, containing two remixes of the originals. "Voyage 34 (Phase 3)" was a remix by the British electronic music group Astralasia, while "Voyage 34 (Phase 4)" was a remix by Wilson himself, along with future band member Richard Barbieri. A voice sample of Dead Can Dance's song "As the Bell Rings the Maypole Spins" is repeated throughout all four tracks as well as a synth effect sampled from Van der Graaf Generator's song "A Plague of Lighthouse Keepers".

Voyage 34: The Complete Trip compiles all four "phases" onto one album.

== Concept ==
Professional ratings
Review scores
| Source | Rating |
|---|---|
| AllMusic | 2.5/5 stars |

Voyage 34 is a concept album, where the LSD trip of a young man called Brian is told with spoken words. During a 2002 interview before the release of In Absentia, Steven Wilson said the following about the release of Voyage 34 after being asked why the band released a 30-minute single:

"It was an anti-single. It was a thirty-minute single about drugs and it had no vocals in it. I thought that no one is going to play this. But it charted anyway. It was the ultimate 'fuck you'. We have released four-minute singles since then. But for Porcupine Tree to release a single is like an oxymoron. It's very difficult to take out a four-minute chunk from an album and say 'Here we are. This totally encapsulates everything Porcupine Tree are about.' It's never been satisfactory to me to release a single. If you know the group, you know that one minute we go from extreme metal riffing to ambient texture, the next minute we'll have a pop hook, and the next minute we'll have some avant-garde sample. All of these things are part of the album. How do you take a chunk of that? To me it's totally unrepresentative."

Wilson said of Voyage 34 in 2012:

The whole point about Voyage 34 was an exercise in genre. In that sense it stands apart from the rest of the catalogue...back in the early Nineties, there was an explosion in ambient music, a fusion of electronic music and techno music with the philosophy of people like Brian Eno and Tangerine Dream. I thought there was an interesting opportunity to do something that would bring progressive rock and psychedelia into that mixture. I wouldn't say Voyage 34 was a technical exercise, that makes it sound like a science project, but it was a one-off experiment in a particular genre in which I knew I wouldn't be staying for very long. I was given a tape of a guy having a bad trip in the Sixties. It was an anti-LSD propaganda album and it was perfect to form a narrative around which I could form this long, hypnotic, trippy piece of music. And that was Voyage 34. Even at the time, I think that sort of music was already passing. Music that is too attached to a trend very soon starts to sound very dated. I was always interested in existing outside the bubble of whatever was hip, and that kind of music was very briefly hip. Voyage 34 sits inside that bubble. I'm still very proud of it. It was a unique piece of music, but of all the catalogue, it's one of the pieces which relates most closely to the era that it was created in.

== Track listing ==
1. "Phase I" – 12:55 sample
2. "Phase II" – 17:31
3. "Phase III" – 19:29
4. "Phase IV" – 19:47

When the tracks were compiled for CD in 2000, the length of Phase IV was cut to 13:42; there is about five minutes of silence after this on the 2004 reissue, followed by a 2-minute hidden track, taking its duration to 20:44. A recent 2017 CD reissue reinstates the original length of 19:47.
