= Metanoia (Porcupine Tree album) =

Compilation album by Porcupine Tree
- Released: 7 December 1998
- Recorded: 13 July 1995 – 3 March 1997
- Genres: Progressive rock, psychedelic rock, space rock
- Length: 65:18 (CD); 55:58 (vinyl)
- Label: Delerium

Porcupine Tree chronology
| Coma Divine – Recorded Live in Rome (1997) | Metanoia (1998) | Stupid Dream (1999) |

Professional ratings
Review scores
| Source | Rating |
|---|---|
| AllMusic | 3/5 stars |

Metanoia is a compilation album by British progressive rock band Porcupine Tree, first released on 10" double-vinyl on 7 December 1998, in a limited run of 1,000 copies. It is mostly made up of improvisations recorded during the Signify sessions, some of which were later shaped into songs. To help deter secondary- and black-market sales, the album was released on CD in December 2001 and re-issued again in 2006; it includes extra, previously released tracks from singles that were sequenced where they were extracted from the longform jams.

The track "Mesmer I" became the basis for tour-only piece "Cryogenics," originally intended for Coma Divine but left out during mixing. A live recording of "Cryogenics" was later restored and released on 2020's EP Coma: Coda (Rome 1997) which made available through the official Porcupine Tree Bandcamp page.

In a critical review on expose.org, the album has been described as "in every way the antithesis of Stupid Dream, and simultaneously every bit as brilliant". A special recognition is given to Chris Maitland and Colin Edwin who show "a masterful display of finesse and energy". The album review is finalized with the highest recommendation to listeners.

The original version of the CD has since been out-of-print. Copies of the original are considered to be quite rare and often go for a high price on online auctioning websites.

Inner and outer cover shows paintings made by Frans Janssen. Design was done by Carl Glover. All tracks were composed by Porcupine Tree.

== Track listing ==
=== CD version ===
| No. | Title | Length |
|---|---|---|
| 1. | "Mesmer I" | 8:33 |
| 2. | "Mesmer II" | 6:03 |
| 3. | "Mesmer III / Coma Divine" | 13:18 |
| 4. | "Door to the River" | 4:25 |
| 5. | "Metanoia I / Intermediate Jesus" | 14:32 |
| 6. | "Insignificance" | 4:55 |
| 7. | "Metanoia II" | 11:03 |
| 8. | "Milan" | 2:25 |

=== Vinyl version ===
==== Side one ====
1. "Mesmer I" - 8:33
2. "Mesmer II" - 6:07

==== Side two ====
1. "Mesmer III/Coma Divine" - 13:18

==== Side three ====
1. "Metanoia I/Intermediate Jesus" - 14:32

==== Side four ====
1. "Metanoia II" - 11:03
2. "Milan" - 2:30

== Track details ==
- The track "Coma Divine" was recorded in Cambridge on 13 July 1995.
- The tracks "Intermediate Jesus" and "Insignificance" were recorded from the same jam in Henley-on-Thames on 4 March 1996. The tracks do not include Richard Barbieri.
- The track "Milan" was recorded in Milan during the Coma Divine tour.
- The tracks "Insignificance" and "Door to the River" appeared on the original cassette release of Insignificance.
