= Chris Maitland =

English drummer (born 1964)

- Maitland in 2026

Background information
- Born: May 13, 1964 (age 62); Cambridge, England
- Genres: Progressive rock; art rock
- Occupation: Musician
- Instruments: Drums; backing vocals
- Member of: Guilt Machine
- Formerly of: No-Man; Porcupine Tree; Kino; Blackfield

Chris Maitland (born 13 May 1964) is an English drummer.

Maitland was born in Cambridge, England. After being the drummer for No-Man on their Autumn 1993 tour (and playing on two tracks on their Flowermouth album), Maitland was asked by the band's Steven Wilson to join his other main project, the progressive rock band Porcupine Tree. He remained the band's drummer until February 2002, when he was dismissed and replaced by Gavin Harrison. He played on the debut album by Blackfield in 2003, sharing drumming duties with Gavin Harrison. Harrison has described Maitland as a great drummer.

Between 2004 and 2005, Maitland was a member of the progressive rock supergroup Kino. Throughout his career, Maitland has been involved with many West End musicals, and from 2005 onwards, he has been playing drums on the Mamma Mia! International Tour. Aside from these links listing professional drumming engagements, having trained at the Mackenzie School of Speech & Drama and taken LAMDA examinations regularly since the age of eight, between 1985 and 1993 Maitland became involved in theatre at Cambridge as an actor. Also during this period he built up a practice of private percussion pupils and from 1989 took on various posts as a professional drum-kit teacher. As an actor, he has played a wide variety of roles, including Shakespearean roles.

In February 2009, it was announced that Maitland would play drums on Arjen Anthony Lucassen's latest project, Guilt Machine.

On 17 April 2011 in Zoetermeer, The Netherlands, Maitland was supposed to reunite on stage with former fellow Porcupine Tree's bass player Colin Edwin and no-man's singer Tim Bowness as part of the Memories of Machines project (a collaboration between Bowness and Giancarlo Erra of Nosound). However, the concert was eventually called off.

In 2013 he joined as guest drummer with band Nosound for their studio album Afterthoughts.

== Discography ==
| Performer | Year | Album |
|---|---|---|
| No-Man | 1993 | Flowermouth |
| Barbieri/Bowness | 1994 | Flame |
| Porcupine Tree | 1995 | The Sky Moves Sideways |
| Porcupine Tree | 1996 | Signify |
| I.E.M. | 1996 | I.E.M. |
| Porcupine Tree | 1997 | Coma Divine |
| Mark Rattray and Maggie Moone | 1997 | Musical Magic |
| Porcupine Tree | 1998 | Metanoia |
| Porcupine Tree | 1999 | Stupid Dream |
| Porcupine Tree | 2000 | Lightbulb Sun |
| I.E.M. | 2001 | Arcadia Son |
| Porcupine Tree | 2001 | Recordings |
| Porcupine Tree | 2002 | Stars Die: The Delerium Years 1991-1997 |
| Porcupine Tree | 2004 | Warszawa |
| Blackfield | 2004 | Blackfield |
| Kino | 2005 | Picture |
| Guilt Machine | 2009 | On This Perfect Day |
| Nosound | 2012 | At the Pier |
| Steve Hogarth/Richard Barbieri | 2012 | Not the Weapon but the Hand |
| Nosound | 2013 | Afterthoughts |
| Colin Edwin/Jon Durant | 2025 | The Baldock Transmission |
