= Up the Downstair =

Studio album by Porcupine Tree
- Released: 7 June 1993
- Recorded: February 1992 – January 1993
- Studios: No Man's Land (Hemel Hempstead, Hertfordshire, England)
- Genres: Progressive rock; space rock; psychedelic rock
- Length: 47:59
- Label: Delerium
- Producer: Steven Wilson

Porcupine Tree chronology
| On the Sunday of Life... (1992) | Up the Downstair (1993) | Spiral Circus (1994) |

Professional ratings
Review scores
| Source | Rating |
|---|---|
| AllMusic | 4/5 stars |
| MMMDI | (8/10) |

Up the Downstair is the second studio album by English progressive rock band Porcupine Tree, first released in June 1993. It was originally intended to be a double album set including the song "Voyage 34", which was instead released as a single in 1992, and other material that ended up on the Staircase Infinities EP (1994). In 2005, it was partially re-recorded, fully re-mixed, remastered and re-released along with the Staircase Infinities EP as a double album. The re-release contains a re-mix by Steven Wilson incorporating newly recorded drums by Gavin Harrison that replace the electronic drums of the original version. Another re-release on double vinyl was pressed on 14 August 2008 on Kscope records. This is identical to the 2005 release, except it is printed on coloured vinyl and the Staircase Infinities disc contains the song "Phantoms".

According to Wilson, Up the Downstair channeled "the Orb and the Future Sound of London, but also Floyd and Ozric Tentacles. If I liked it, I didn't give a fuck."

== Track listing ==
All music written by Steven Wilson.

Side one
| No. | Title | Lyrics | Length |
|---|---|---|---|
| 1. | "What You Are Listening To..." | | 0:58 |
| 2. | "Synesthesia" | Wilson | 5:11 |
| 3. | "Monuments Burn into Moments" | | 0:20 |
| 4. | "Always Never" | Alan Duffy | 6:58 |
| 5. | "Up the Downstair" | | 10:03 |

Side two
| No. | Title | Lyrics | Length |
|---|---|---|---|
| 1. | "Not Beautiful Anymore" | | 3:26 |
| 2. | "Siren" | | 0:52 |
| 3. | "Small Fish" | Duffy | 2:43 |
| 4. | "Burning Sky" | | 11:06 |
| 5. | "Fadeaway" | Duffy | 6:19 |

=== 2005 remastered and remixed edition ===
Many songs differ a little in length in the remastered edition of Up the Downstair.

Disc one – Up the Downstair (2004 version)
| No. | Title | Length |
|---|---|---|
| 1. | "What You Are Listening To..." | 0:57 |
| 2. | "Synesthesia" | 5:16 |
| 3. | "Monuments Burn into Moments" | 0:22 |
| 4. | "Always Never" | 7:00 |
| 5. | "Up the Downstair" | 10:14 |
| 6. | "Not Beautiful Anymore" | 3:25 |
| 7. | "Siren" | 0:57 |
| 8. | "Small Fish" | 2:42 |
| 9. | "Burning Sky" | 11:36 |
| 10. | "Fadeaway" | 6:19 |

Disc two – Staircase Infinities
| No. | Title | Length |
|---|---|---|
| 1. | "Cloud Zero" | 4:40 |
| 2. | "The Joke's on You" | 4:17 |
| 3. | "Navigator" | 4:49 |
| 4. | "Rainy Taxi" | 6:50 |
| 5. | "Yellow Hedgerow Dreamscape" | 9:36 |

== Personnel ==
=== Porcupine Tree ===
- Steven Wilson – vocals, all other instruments

=== Additional personnel ===
- Colin Edwin – bass guitar on "Always Never"
- Richard Barbieri – electronics on "Up the Downstair"
- Suzanne J. Barbieri – vocals on "Up the Downstair"
- Gavin Harrison – drums (disc one, 2004 edition only)
- Alan Duffy – co-songwriting on "Always Never", "Small Fish", "Fadeaway" and "The Joke's on You"

== Reviews ==
Professional reviews:

- Melody Maker – "They've embarked upon a mission impossible: to create a truly Nineties progressive rock soundscape, utilising modern technology but avoiding prog pomposity. And they've managed it with room to spare. It's a strange and wonderful brew, taking in Orb ambience, FSoL dub, Metallica steel and all points in between. Ambient space dubs, technological cut-ups and Gregorian chants texture the sound, but the fire at the heart of the noise comes from good old guitar. Be warned, there are solos here, but they're played with a force and a purity that defies indulgence."
- Organ – "Up the Downstair is an LP that hides many surprises for the attentive listener. After a few spins you realise that even the sounds mixed into the background and the vocal interventions from old 'drug' records all play a part in this warm, soothing lysergic tapestry that contains sparse, but matching lyrics. When I wrote an article on Porcupine Tree last year (published in Crohinga Well 2) I predicted that this act would become a 'third way' in New British Psychedelia (the first and second being the psychedelic rock of Bevis Frond and the spacey festival sounds of Ozric Tentacles, of course). This record only confirms my statement. Up the Downstair is a record to get incredibly stoned to (and you will...)!"
- CMJ – "Up the Downstair retains the band's willowy roots in Albion psychedelia but expands the brief, dropping its cheesy self-consciousness while infusing some contemporary dance auras (from acidic mesmerism to almost funky syncopation) with more 'group-like' interaction."
