= Porcupine Tree =

English progressive rock band

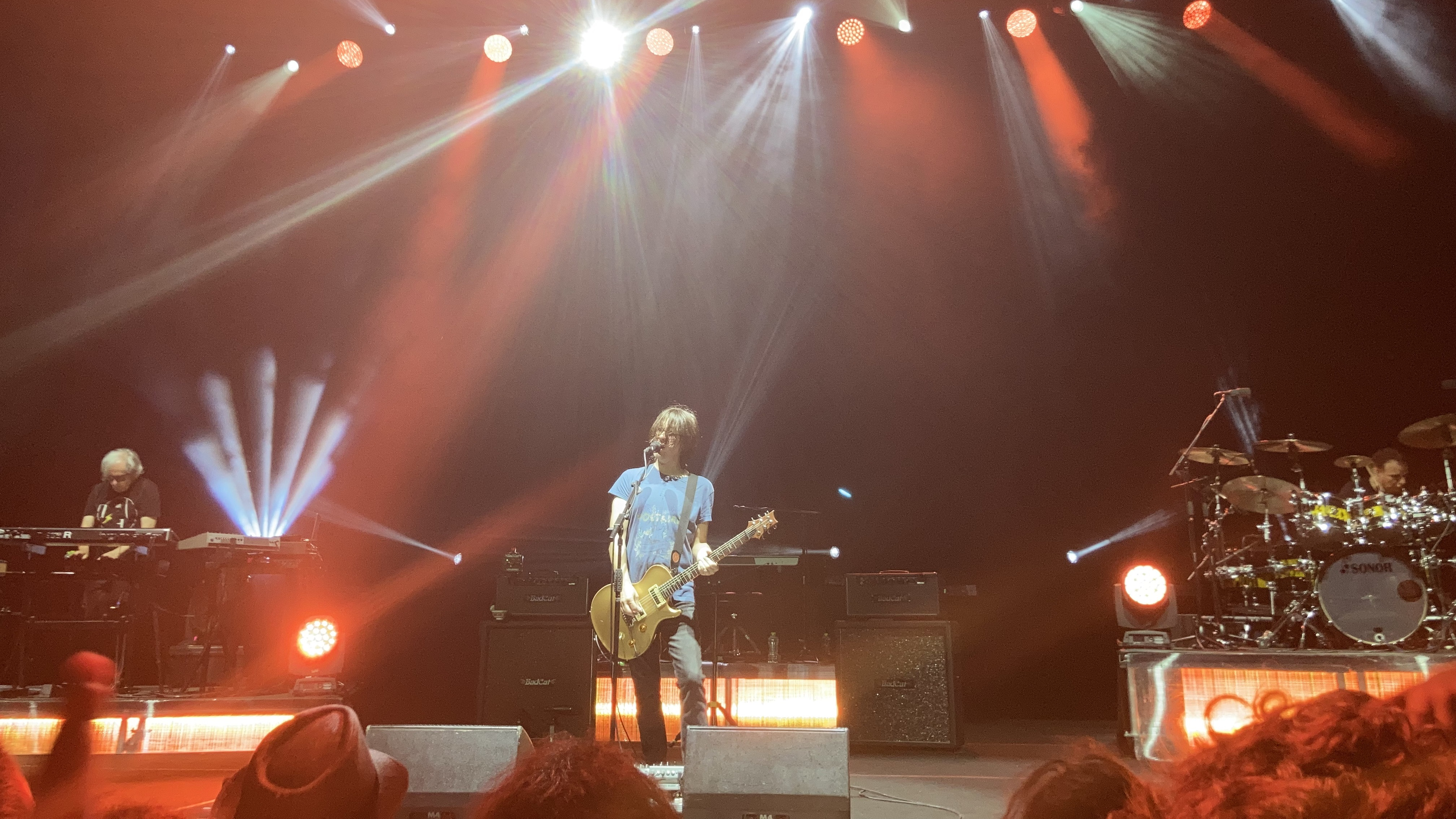
- Porcupine Tree performing in 2023

Background information
- Origin: Hemel Hempstead, Hertfordshire, England
- Genres: Progressive rock; progressive metal; post-progressive; psychedelic rock; experimental rock
- Works: Discography
- Years active: 1987–2010; 2021–present
- Labels: Delerium; Snapper; Lava; Transmission; Roadrunner; Atlantic; WHD; Headspin; Peaceville; Kscope; Music For Nations
- Members: Steven Wilson; Richard Barbieri; Gavin Harrison
- Past members: Colin Edwin; Chris Maitland
- Website: porcupinetree.com

Porcupine Tree are an English progressive rock band formed by musician Steven Wilson in 1987. During an initial career spanning more than twenty years, they earned acclaim from critics and fellow musicians, developed a cult following, and became an influence for new artists. The group carved out a career at a certain distance away from mainstream music, being described by publications such as Classic Rock and PopMatters as "the most important band you'd never heard of".

The band began as a solo project for Wilson, who initially created all of the band's music himself. By late 1993, however, he wanted to work in a band environment, bringing on frequent collaborators Richard Barbieri as keyboardist, Colin Edwin as bassist, and Chris Maitland as drummer to form the first permanent lineup. With Wilson as lead vocalist and guitarist, this remained the lineup until February 2002, when Maitland left the band and Gavin Harrison was recruited to replace him. Porcupine Tree's early sound evoked various styles of psychedelic rock, space rock and experimental rock, later moving towards a more progressive/space rock direction comparable to that of Pink Floyd. Upon signing with Kscope record label in the late 1990s, the band began to approach a more mainstream alternative rock sound. By the early 2000s, the band had signed to a major record label and shifted their sound again, this time in a more progressive metal direction.

In 2010, after the tour in support of their 2009 studio album The Incident, the band became publicly inactive as Wilson committed himself to his solo work and other members began working on their own separate projects. However, Wilson, Barbieri and Harrison continued to intermittently work on material in secrecy over the course of the following decade, leading to the release of their album Closure/Continuation on 24 June 2022.

== History ==
=== Origins (1987–1990) ===
Porcupine Tree originated in 1987 as a collaborative hoax project by Steven Wilson and Malcolm Stocks. Partially inspired by the psychedelic/progressive bands of the 1970s, such as Pink Floyd, that had dominated the music scene during their youth, the two decided to form a fictional legendary rock band named The Porcupine Tree. The two fabricated a detailed backstory that described alleged band members and album titles, as well as a "colourful" history which purportedly included events such as a meeting at a 1970s rock festival and several trips in and out of prison. As soon as he had put aside enough money to buy his own studio equipment, Wilson obliged this creation with several hours of music to provide "evidence" of its existence. Although Stocks provided a few passages of treated vocals and experimental guitar playing, his role in the project was mostly offering occasional ideas, with the bulk of the material being written, performed, and recorded by Wilson himself.

At this point, Porcupine Tree was little more than a joke and a private amusement, as Wilson was concentrating on his other project, No-Man, an endeavour with UK based singer and songwriter Tim Bowness. However, by 1989, he began to consider some of the Porcupine Tree music as potentially marketable. Wilson created an 80-minute-long cassette titled Tarquin's Seaweed Farm under the name of Porcupine Tree. Still showing the spirit of his joke, Wilson included an eight-page inlay which further revealed the hoaxed Porcupine Tree backstory, including references to fictitious band members such as "Sir Tarquin Underspoon" and "Timothy Tadpole-Jones".

Wilson sent out copies of Tarquin's Seaweed Farm to several people he felt would be interested in the recordings. Nick Saloman, the cult UK guitarist better known as The Bevis Frond, had suggested that he send one to Richard Allen, a writer for the UK counter-cultural magazine Encyclopaedia Psychedelica and co-editor of the UK psychedelic garage rock magazine Freakbeat. Allen reviewed the tape in both magazines. Despite disliking some material on the cassette, he gave an overall positive review. Several months later, Allen invited Wilson to contribute a track to the double LP A Psychedelic Psauna that was being put together to launch the new Delerium label. Allen would also become the band's manager, press agent, and promoter until 2004, his role in marketing the band's image decreasing after The Sky Moves Sideways album. In the meantime, Wilson had continued to work on new material. In 1990, he released the Love, Death & Mussolini EP, issued in a very limited run of 10 copies. The EP remains an extremely rare, collectible piece. It was composed of nine at-the-time-unreleased tracks, as a preview for the upcoming second album. In 1991, Wilson released a second full-length Porcupine Tree cassette called The Nostalgia Factory, which further expanded Porcupine Tree's underground fanbase, although the band was still carrying on the charade of being 1970s rock legends. By this point, Porcupine Tree was entirely a solo project, with Stocks having amicably moved on to other activities.

=== The Delerium years (1991–1997) ===
==== On the Sunday of Life... ====
Along with the A Psychedelic Psauna compilation, which featured the Porcupine Tree track "Linton Samuel Dawson", the newly formed Delerium label, formed by Freakbeat editors Richard Allen and Ivor Trueman, offered to reissue the cassettes Tarquin's Seaweed Farm and The Nostalgia Factory. Two hundred copies of each cassette were sold through Freakbeat's mail order, The Freak Emporium, and soon Porcupine Tree became known as a mysterious new act amongst the then UK underground psychedelic music scene.

Shortly thereafter, Delerium invited Wilson to sign as one of the label's founder artists. The first release after this, a double vinyl album and single CD compiling the best material from his two cassettes, was released in mid-1992 as On the Sunday of Life, a title chosen from a long list of possible nonsense titles compiled by Richard Allen. The rest of the music from the initial tapes was released on the limited edition compilation album Yellow Hedgerow Dreamscape.

In 1992, Delerium released On the Sunday of Life as an edition of 1,000 copies, complete with a deluxe gatefold sleeve. The album sold very well, particularly in Italy, and it was briefly repressed on vinyl and has remained in print on CD ever since its release. The album featured future concert favourite and frequent encore song "Radioactive Toy". By 2000, On the Sunday of Life... had accumulated sales of more than 20,000 copies. On the Sunday of Life was originally meant to be a quadruple (LP)/double (CD) album compiling both cassettes in full, but changed to the best (according to Wilson) songs from the tapes. In 2004, Wilson remixed and remastered all three tapes, releasing them as a three-CD box set called Footprints: Cassette Music 1988-1992. This box was only distributed to family and friends.

==== Up the Downstair ====
In the midst of Porcupine Tree's rising success, Wilson's other band, No-Man, had been getting excellent UK press, which led to the band being signed to leading UK independent music publisher, Hit & Run Music Publishing, in 1991, which resulted in recording agreements with One Little Indian Records, and Epic 440/Sony in the US. No-Man's success gave Wilson the opportunity to leave his regular job and devote his time solely to music. All of the Delirium releases were published by Hit & Run, whose executive Dave Massey had signed No-Man and continued to be closely involved in the Porcupine Tree project.

In May 1993, the second Porcupine Tree album, Up the Downstair, was released, another prospective double album that was finally slimmed down to a single record. "Voyage 34" was actually going to take up the second disc, but it was last decided to be released alone as a single. The album was highly praised, Melody Maker describing it as "a psychedelic masterpiece... one of the albums of the year." The album continued the fusion of electronic music and rock and also featured guest appearances from two future Porcupine Tree members, Richard Barbieri, of 1970s-80s art rock band Japan, and Colin Edwin.

In November 1993, Voyage 34 was reissued alongside an additional 12-inch remix by Astralasia. The album managed to enter the NME indie chart for six weeks and became an underground chill-out classic, even without radio play.

==== The Sky Moves Sideways ====
The profile of Porcupine Tree had now grown to the extent that Wilson wanted to expand into live performances. Thus, in December 1993, Porcupine Tree became a live unit featuring Wilson on lead vocals/guitar, Colin Edwin on bass, Chris Maitland on drums, and Richard Barbieri on keyboards.

"The Sky Moves Sideways Phase 1"
from The Sky Moves Sideways, which contains some of Steven Wilson's longest compositions. The band evolved into a more electronic, ambient, and trance sound, and included more jam-like parts. The song is mostly instrumental and consists of four movements; the US release has an individual track for each section.

All three new members of the group had worked with Wilson on various projects over the preceding years, especially Barbieri and Maitland, who had been part of No-Man's touring band. The new line-up's first live album, Spiral Circus, contained recordings from their first three performances, including a BBC Radio One session for Mark Radcliffe, an early champion of the group.

Porcupine Tree's next album did not emerge until early 1995, but was preceded by the Moonloop EP, the last two tracks of which were recorded during the album sessions and were the first to feature the new band. Released in 1995, the band's third studio album, The Sky Moves Sideways became a success among progressive rock fans and Porcupine Tree were hailed as the Pink Floyd of the 1990s. Wilson later lamented this, stating, "I can't help that. It's true that during the period of The Sky Moves Sideways, I had done a little too much of it in the sense of satisfying, in a way, the fans of Pink Floyd who were listening to us because that group doesn't make albums any more. Moreover, I regret it".

The Sky Moves Sideways was an "expansive soundscape of melody and ambient rock experimentation", but proved to be a transitional work, with half recorded before the formation of the band and half recorded after. Most of the album was taken up with the 35-minute title track, which at one point Wilson had intended to be long enough to occupy the whole album. An alternate version of the track, containing some of the excised music, was included on the 2004 remastered version of the album. It also entered the NME, Melody Maker, and Music Week charts. Together with the Moonloop EP, this album was the first Porcupine Tree music issued in America in the autumn of 1995, and attracted favourable press on both sides of the Atlantic. The band supported the album with numerous concerts throughout the year at major music venues in the UK, the Netherlands, Italy, and Greece.

==== Signify ====
Partly unsatisfied with the half band/half solo nature of The Sky Moves Sideways, Porcupine Tree promptly got down to the task of recording the first proper band record. Wilson admitted he was always "in love with the idea of the rock band" because "bands have a kind of glamour, and appeal, and a romance about them the solo projects just don't have." The band worked sporadically over the next year on developing a tighter and more ambitious rock sound.

"Every Home Is Wired"
from Signify. This album contains shorter pieces than its predecessor, and featured the first collaborative compositions between Wilson and the other band members.

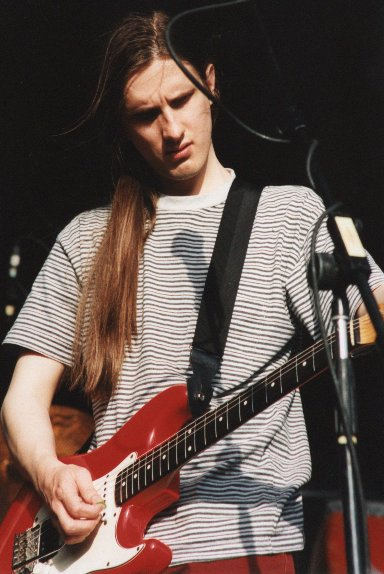
Steven Wilson at the Strawberry Fair, Cambridge, 1997

After the release of the first real Porcupine Tree single, "Waiting", which entered all UK indie charts and the UK National chart and attracting airplay all over Europe, Signify was released in September 1996. The album was a mixture of instrumental tracks and more song-oriented tunes, blending numerous rock and avant-garde styles, such as krautrock. Wilson expressed satisfaction in the direction of the album, stating "tracks like 'Every Home Is Wired' and 'Dark Matter' totally transcend both genre and comparison. Finally, I think we are making a completely original and 1990s form of music, but which still has its root in progressive music." The musicians received writing credits for some tracks, most notably for "Intermediate Jesus", which evolved from a jam session later released as Metanoia at the end of 1998. A large amount of major European media interest accompanied the album's release.

In March 1997, they played three nights in Rome to an audience that surpassed 5,000 people. All three dates were recorded for use in the 1997 live album Coma Divine – Recorded Live in Rome that was released as a goodbye to Delerium Records, which felt it could no longer offer the kind of resources the band needed to continue to build its profile worldwide. In late 1997 Porcupine Tree's first three albums were remastered and reissued. Signify also was re-released in the US in January 1998 on Miles Copeland's Ark 21 label.

=== The Snapper years (1998–2001) ===
==== Stupid Dream ====
Wilson, Barbieri, Edwin, and Maitland spent all of 1998 recording their fifth studio album, a release that reflected the band's move towards a more song-oriented writing. Wilson acknowledged this time he was "much more interested in songwriting as an art form, as opposed to soundscape development" and commented he took influence from The Beach Boys' Pet Sounds, Todd Rundgren, Crosby, Stills, Nash & Young, and "anything with really good ensemble singing". He also indicated that he was "interested in the idea of the pop song as a kind of experimental symphony".

"Pure Narcotic"
is a single from Stupid Dream. "Pure Narcotic" is an acoustic song without drums. Radiohead's album The Bends is mentioned by name in the lyrics. Stupid Dream evidenced a change of direction in the sound of the band, being a more song-oriented record.

The band recorded the album without a label, but signed with Snapper/Kscope before releasing Stupid Dream, in March 1999. The album was supported by a tour of the United Kingdom, Italy, Greece, the Netherlands, Belgium, Switzerland, Germany, France, Poland, and the United States. The three singles taken from the album: "Piano Lessons", "Stranger by the Minute", and "Pure Narcotic", all achieved mainstream exposure in the US and in Europe, and placed well in the UK independent charts and on radio-station playlists. Although the album was a departure from their earlier sound, it brought the band new-found popularity and went on to become the band's best-selling and most acclaimed release up to that time.

==== Lightbulb Sun ====
Completed for February 2000, with string arrangements provided by Dave Gregory of XTC, Porcupine Tree's sixth studio album, Lightbulb Sun, built on the mix of songwriting, soundscaping, and rock dynamics of Stupid Dream. The album was released in May 2000, preceded by the single "Four Chords That Made a Million". A sold-out show at the Scala in London began a short run of UK shows, that were followed later in the year by European festival dates and a major tour supporting Dream Theater. The band continued touring through the end of 2000 and start of 2001, including their first major tour of Germany. A special double CD edition of the Lightbulb Sun album was issued in Israel and Germany.

In May, the band released a compilation B-side album called Recordings, which featured nine tracks from the Stupid Dream and Lightbulb Sun sessions that had been left off both albums. In May 2001, Porcupine Tree did three consecutive dates as a support band to Marillion, in France, Germany, and the Netherlands. In June, the band played a short US tour, starting with an appearance in NEARfest of Pennsylvania, and culminating in a sold-out show at The Bottom Line in New York City. Shortly afterwards, the band announced that they had signed a new international record deal with Lava/Atlantic Records.

=== The Lava years (2002–2005) ===
==== In Absentia ====
In February 2002, Porcupine Tree's first line-up change occurred when drummer Chris Maitland was dismissed after eight years with the band. The band welcomed drummer and longtime acquaintance Gavin Harrison as his replacement. In March 2002, a box set of the band's early work was released, Stars Die: The Delerium Years 1991–1997, and the band commenced recording their first major label album, drawing from a pool of thirty new songs written by Wilson in the previous two years. Recording sessions took place at Avatar Studios in New York and London, with veteran audio engineer Paul Northfield and string arranger Dave Gregory also playing major roles in the making of the record. The album was mixed in Los Angeles in May with Tim Palmer.

The resulting album, In Absentia, was released by Lava Records in September 2002. The band also released a 5.1 surround-sound version of the album, mixed by Grammy Award-winning producer Elliot Scheiner. The surround-sound version of the album won the award for best 5.1 mix at the 2004 Surround Sound Music awards in Los Angeles.

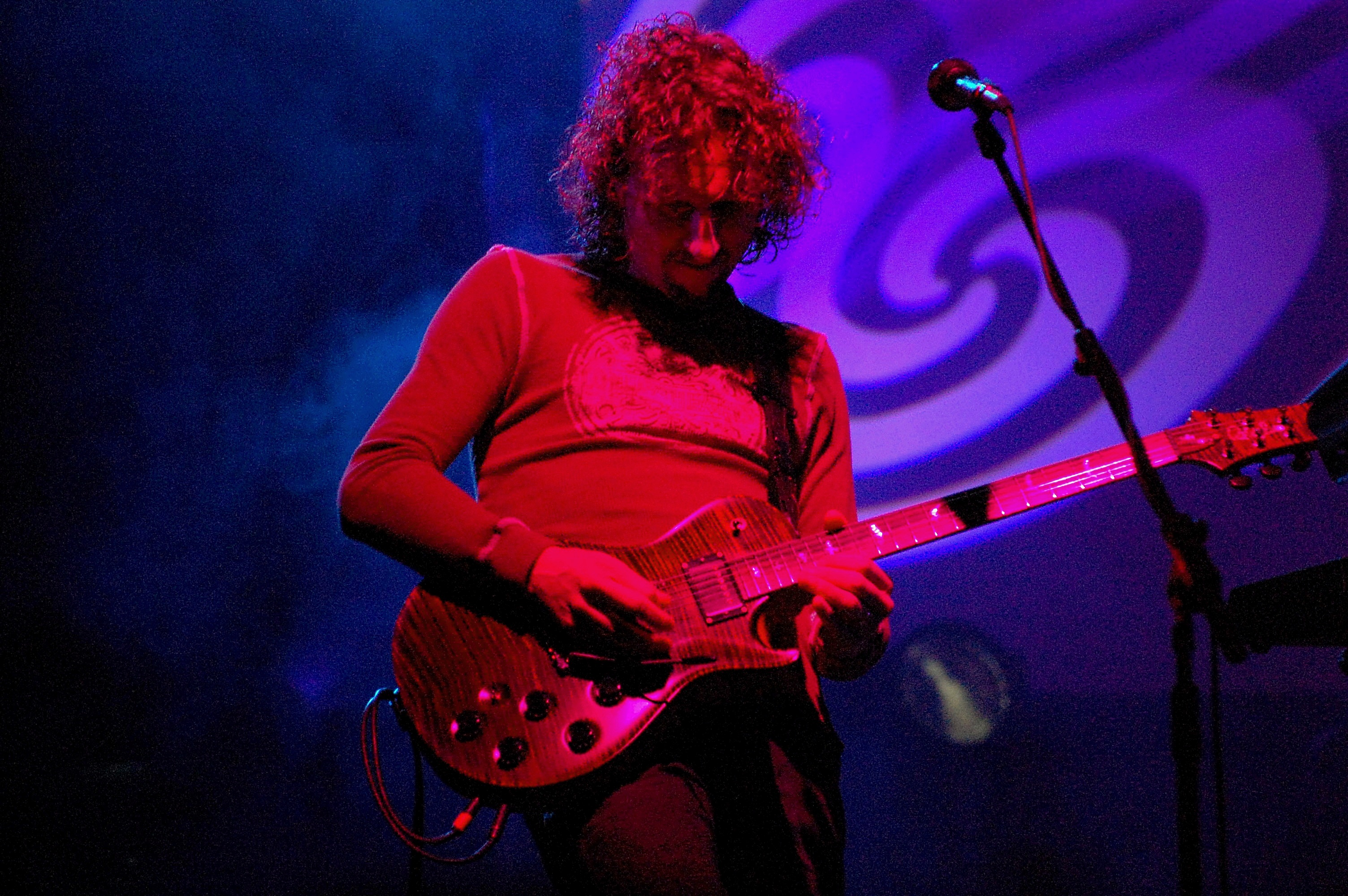
Touring guitarist and backing vocalist John Wesley performing with the band in Poland, 2007

To promote the album, the band undertook four tours of Europe and North America, including one with acclaimed Swedish metal band Opeth. On tour, the new line-up of the band was further augmented by additional touring vocalist/guitarist John Wesley. During these tours, the visual element of the band's performance was taken to new heights with the involvement of filmmaker and photographer Lasse Hoile, who had created the cover art for In Absentia and now went on to create a dark and surreal visual to Porcupine Tree's music. The long promotional campaign for In Absentia ended on 30 November 2003, as the band played a homecoming show to a sold-out London Astoria.

"Blackest Eyes"
from In Absentia. Again, the style of the band changed notably, besides guitars were tuned down. The song features a heavy riff, acoustic passages, and a catchy, flown chorus.

"Lazarus"
from Deadwing, is a ballad that was chosen for the European single. It features some voice harmonies by Mikael Åkerfeldt from Opeth. The whole song develops over a minimalist piano melody.

During 2003, Porcupine Tree set up their own label, Transmission, with an online store hosted by Burning Shed record label. The first release on the Transmission label was a studio session recorded for XM Radio in Washington, DC, followed in 2004 by a recording from Polish radio in 2001. The band used the label to issue supplemental content, such as EPs, demos, and live recordings. Additionally, a reissue/remaster campaign also began in 2003, with many of the early albums expanded to double CDs. These reissues included re-recorded/remixed double-CD versions of the Up the Downstair, The Sky Moves Sideways, and Signify albums, and the reissue of Stupid Dream and Lightbulb Sun, both consisting of a CD with a new stereo mix of the album plus a DVD-Audio with a 5.1 surround mix.

==== Deadwing ====
In early 2004, the band embarked on the recording sessions for their next record, Deadwing, their second for Lava/Atlantic. The album takes its inspiration from a film script written by Wilson with his filmmaker friend Mike Bennion. The album sessions completed in November 2004, and Deadwing was released in Europe and the US during the spring of 2005 as both a stereo and 5.1 surround-sound album, preceded by the release of two singles, "Shallow" in the US and "Lazarus" in Europe. The album benefited from guest appearances by Adrian Belew from King Crimson and Opeth's Mikael Åkerfeldt, and was a commercial success, due in part to "Shallow" receiving airplay, peaking at number 26 on Billboard's Hot Mainstream Rock Tracks. Additionally, "Lazarus" entered the German singles Top 100 at number 91. The song "Shallow" was also featured in the soundtrack for the film Four Brothers.

The album won the Surround Music Awards for "Best Made-For-Surround Title" the same year of its release and was voted number-two album of 2005 in Sound & Vision, the most widely distributed US magazine in the field of home electronics and entertainment. Porcupine Tree released Deadwing in Japan on 22 March 2006, the first album by the band to be released in that country.

The tour to promote the album commenced in the UK at the end of March, and continued throughout the year. Mike Bennion created a Myspace page dedicated to the prospective Deadwing film, in which he posted the first 15 pages of the script and included a trailer. However, whilst the scripts are finished, the project is still on hiatus due to lack of budget.

=== The Roadrunner years (2006–2010) ===
==== Fear of a Blank Planet ====
In August 2006, Porcupine Tree announced that the band had signed with Roadrunner Records UK. Prior to their first release on Roadrunner, the band released their first live concert DVD, Arriving Somewhere..., on 10 October 2006. It was accompanied by a brief tour in which the group performed 50 minutes of new material from the forthcoming studio album for the first half of the shows. Supporting acts included Swedish band Paatos in Europe and ProjeKct Six in the United States.

"Fear of a Blank Planet"
is a single from Fear of a Blank Planet. The song's lyrics deal with two common neurobehavioural developmental disorders for teenagers in the 21st Century: bipolar disorder and attention deficit disorder.

"Way Out of Here"
from Fear of a Blank Planet. The song contains soundscapes provided by King Crimson's guitarist, Robert Fripp, and is remarkable for being the only full-band composition of the record.

The band announced the next album's title would be Fear of a Blank Planet in January 2007 and the album was released on 16 April 2007. The album charted in almost all European countries, and peaked at number 59 on the Billboard 200. A 92-date tour for 2007 took the band to countries where they had never performed, such as Finland and Mexico. The tour included appearances in multiple music festivals such as the Voodoo Experience in New Orleans, the German twin-festivals, Hurricane and Southside, and the Download Festival of Donington Park. The band performed their first ever shows in Australia in 2008.

The lyrics of the album deal with some common behaviour tendencies concerning society, especially youth, in the beginning of the 21st century, such as bipolar disorder, attention deficit disorder, drug abuse, alienation, and deprivation caused by mass media. The concept of the album was inspired by Bret Easton Ellis novel Lunar Park and the title alludes to Public Enemy's album, Fear of a Black Planet, both sharing the particularity of reflecting notorious conflicts affecting society in the world at some time. Wilson notes that whilst race relationship was the main issue among young people when Public Enemy's album was released, it was replaced in the 21st century by a general superficiality, boredom, and introversion. The album features contributions from Rush's Alex Lifeson and King Crimson's Robert Fripp.

Wilson: "My fear is that the current generation of kids who're being born into this information revolution, growing up with the Internet, cell phones, iPods, this download culture, 'American Idol,' reality TV, prescription drugs, PlayStations—all of these things kind of distract people from what's important about life, which is to develop a sense of curiosity about what's out there."

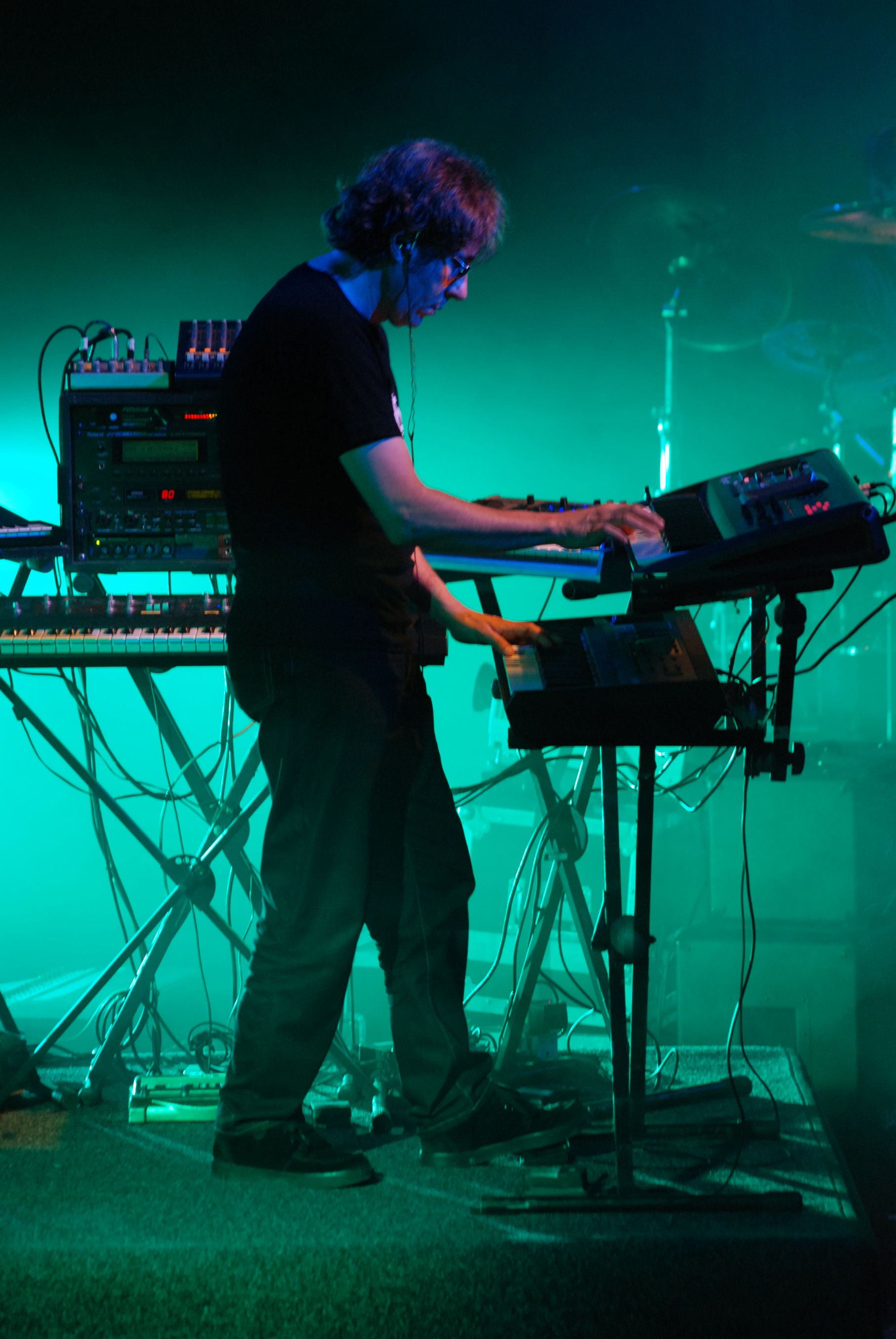
Richard Barbieri during a Porcupine Tree performance in Kraków, Poland, in 2007

On 5 November 2007, Fear of a Blank Planet won the Album of the Year award for the 2007 Classic Rock magazine awards. In December 2007, it was nominated for a Grammy Award for "Best Surround Sound Album" though Love by The Beatles won the award.

A new EP called Nil Recurring was released on 17 September 2007, featuring four unreleased tracks from the Fear of a Blank Planet sessions and including another contribution from Robert Fripp. The second leg of the tour started on 3 October 2007, now promoting new music from the EP. Nil Recurring entered the UK Top 30 Independent Label Albums at number eight. The EP was reissued on 18 February 2008 through Peaceville Records.

A recording from a 4 October 2007 in-store, mostly acoustic, performance at Park Avenue CDs in Orlando, Florida, was released on 18 February 2008 on CD under the name of We Lost The Skyline. The title is a reference to the lyrics of "The Sky Moves Sideways (Phase One)", which was the opening song on the live set. The album was released on vinyl of 21 March 2008. While intended to be a full-band show, the lack of space in the store only allowed the two guitarists, Wilson and John Wesley, to play.

==== The Incident ====
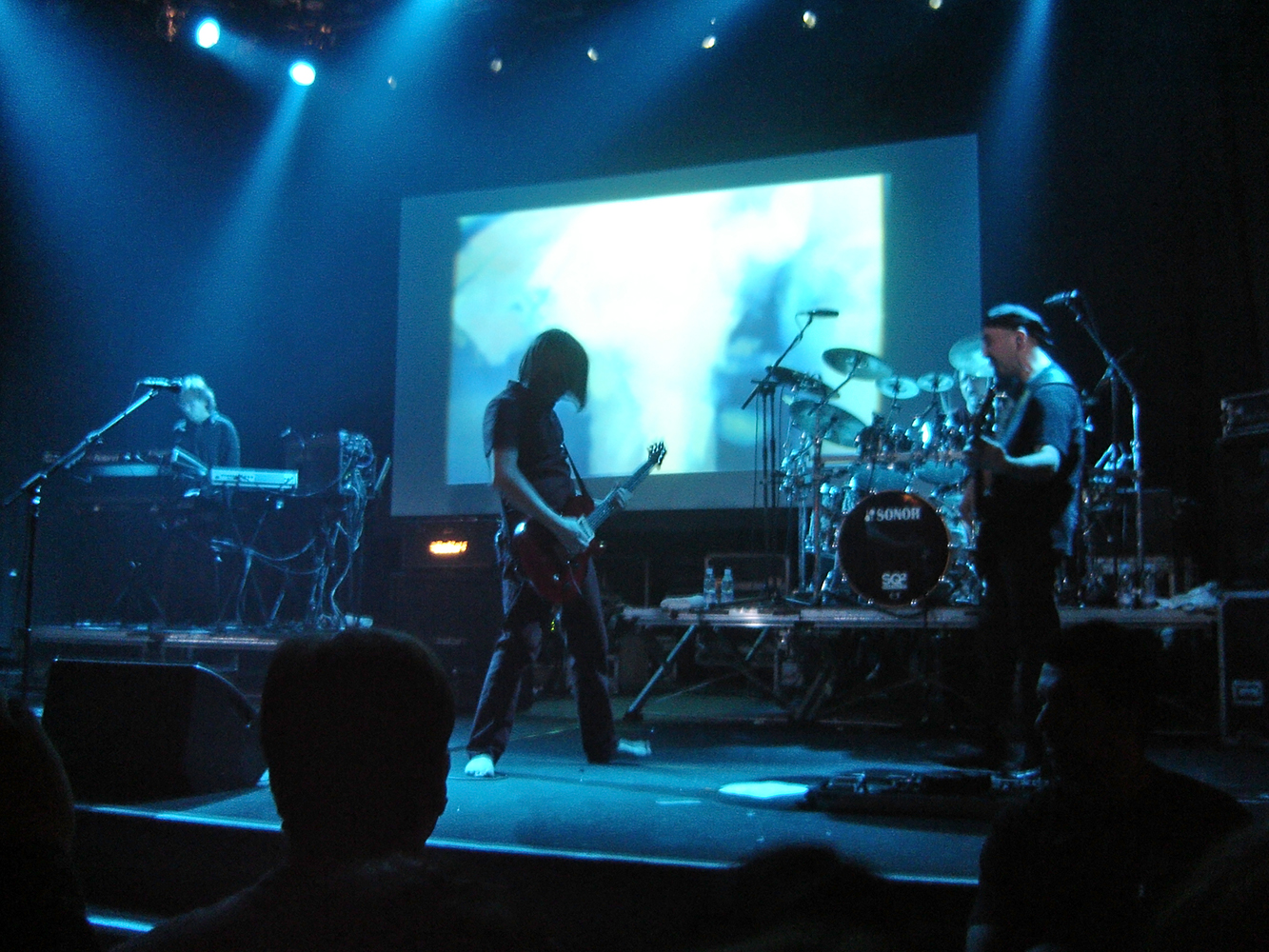
Porcupine Tree in Madrid, 2008; Richard Barbieri (left), Steven Wilson, Gavin Harrison (on drums) and Colin Edwin

The band played a short European tour in October 2008 to shoot their second live-concert film, Anesthetize, preceded by three concerts in Australia in April. The filming took place on 15 and 16 October in the Netherlands at the 013 Tilburg venue. During one of these shows, Wilson mentioned that Porcupine Tree had started work on material for their next album, with an eye toward a release in 2009. The live-concert film on DVD and Blu-ray was released on 20 May 2010.

The band started recording their tenth studio album, The Incident, in February 2009. This was confirmed by the band, stating, "Writing for the next PT studio record is well underway, with the band recently spending two weeks scheduled in the English countryside working on new tracks. Recording of these pieces and a new 35-minute SW song cycle were due to start in February..." Months later, Wilson commented the 35-minute song kept evolving and now it has become a 55-minute song, occupying the entire disc.

On 12 June 2009, details were revealed on the Porcupine Tree website, "the record is set to be released via Roadrunner Records worldwide on 21 September, as a double CD. The centrepiece is the title track, which takes up the whole of the first disc. The 55-minute work is described as a slightly surreal song cycle about beginnings and endings and the sense that 'after this, things will never be the same again.' The self-produced album is completed by four standalone compositions that developed out of band writing sessions last December – Flicker, Bonnie The Cat, Black Dahlia, and Remember Me Lover feature on a separate EP-length disc to stress their independence from the song cycle." The album was the band's biggest commercial success to date, reaching number 23 in the UK album charts and also reaching the US Billboard Top 25.

The band also released another live album, Atlanta, in June 2010. The performance was actually recorded during the tour of Fear of a Blank Planet at the Roxy theatre, Atlanta, on 29 October 2007. It was released via online distribution only, with all the sale proceeds donated to Mick Karn for his treatment against cancer.

=== Inactivity and hiatus (2011–2020) ===
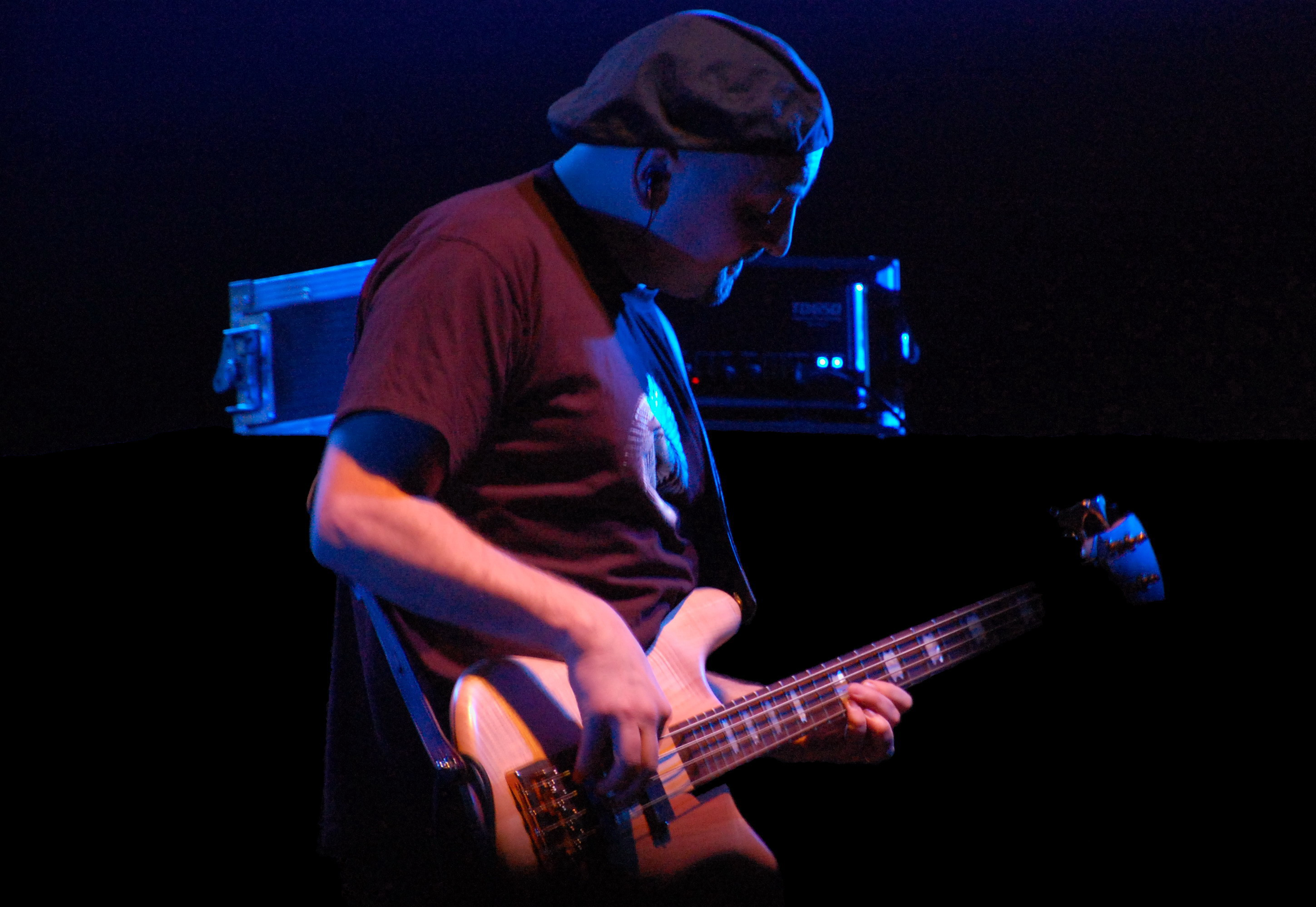
Colin Edwin in Poland, 2007

After finishing the touring cycle for The Incident in 2010, Wilson spent the rest of the year, and 2011, recording and releasing his second solo album, Grace for Drowning, and Blackfield's third album, Welcome to my DNA. Initially, the band had mentioned the possibility of working on new music in 2012, with Wilson mentioning "early 2012", and Harrison guessing they would start work in 2012 and release music in 2013. However, this soon changed, with Wilson announcing that he would continue to focus his future on his solo career. This new focus included a second leg of touring in support of Grace for Drowning in the first half of 2012, recording a third solo album in the second half of the year with his touring band, releasing it in early 2013, and then touring in support of the third solo album for "much of the year" – throughout 2013. Wilson still maintained that the band "haven't split up" and that there are "no intentions of splitting up", but he also said there were no specific plans for a new album either. While he said that he still "want(s) to get Porcupine Tree back together at some point", he said that he was not sure what direction he wants to take the band, only that he is "tired of metal music", and that one member of the band does not like jazz, so it won't go into the direction of his solo project either.

In June 2012, Wilson re-emphasised his continued focus on his solo career, with his answer to the question "...is (there) a danger that Porcupine Tree might fall by the wayside?" being, "The honest answer is I don't know. The solo career for me now is probably the most important. I think about it more than anything else, I'm more focused on it than anything else, I enjoy it more than anything else..." A two-disc live album titled Octane Twisted was released that following November by their record label, Kscope, containing a live recording of The Incident in its entirety, from material recorded at 2010 concerts at the Riviera Theater, Chicago, and the Royal Albert Hall. In May 2013, Wilson reiterated his stance on the band's status, stating that it's "...not to say the band has broken up or anything like that. It's always conceivable that we could get back together in a year or five years, or 10 years. I really can't say – there are no plans at the moment." Edwin's stance mirrored this.

After Wilson released his third solo album, The Raven That Refused to Sing (And Other Stories) in February 2013, and toured in support of it for the remainder of the year, its success led Wilson to commit to writing and recording a fourth solo album Hand. Cannot. Erase. over the course of 2014 and releasing it in 2015, pushing hypothetical work with Porcupine Tree into at least 2016. In March 2015, Wilson commented, "if Porcupine Tree [were] to get back together—and, by the way, I have never ruled that out—it will be a side project. There should be no question in anyone's mind that this is now my main musical path, my solo work."

Moving into 2016, Wilson's views on a re-formation were conflicting. In February 2016, in an interview with Prog Magazine, he stated that there was a "strong possibility" of Porcupine Tree re-forming for another studio album at an undisclosed time in the future. However, in response to a question in August 2016 regarding a hypothetical Porcupine Tree performance, Wilson claimed, "you'd be waiting for a long time, that band doesn't exist anymore." In August 2017, Wilson explained: "It's no coincidence that since my solo project has taken off, other collaborations have receded to the background. Porcupine Tree hasn't made a record since 2009 and No-Man hasn't made a record since 2008. I feel less need now to be creatively involved in something other than my solo work. My solo work fulfills the musical needs I have now."

In a March 2018 interview when asked about the chances of further activity from Porcupine Tree he responded; "Honestly, I would say zero, because I'm just not that kind of person. I don't go backwards. I'm not interested in going backwards; I want to move forwards, I want to do different things, I want to work with different people, I want to explore different kinds of music. That would seem like a terribly backward step to me. I'm proud of the catalogue; it's there, it exists, but it's kind of closed, it's finished." These statements caused an increased tension between him and Barbieri, who was waiting for Wilson to return to Porcupine Tree. However, in February 2021, Wilson suggested that a re-formation was still possible someday, when it was least expected.

=== Reunion, Closure/Continuation and future (2021–present) ===
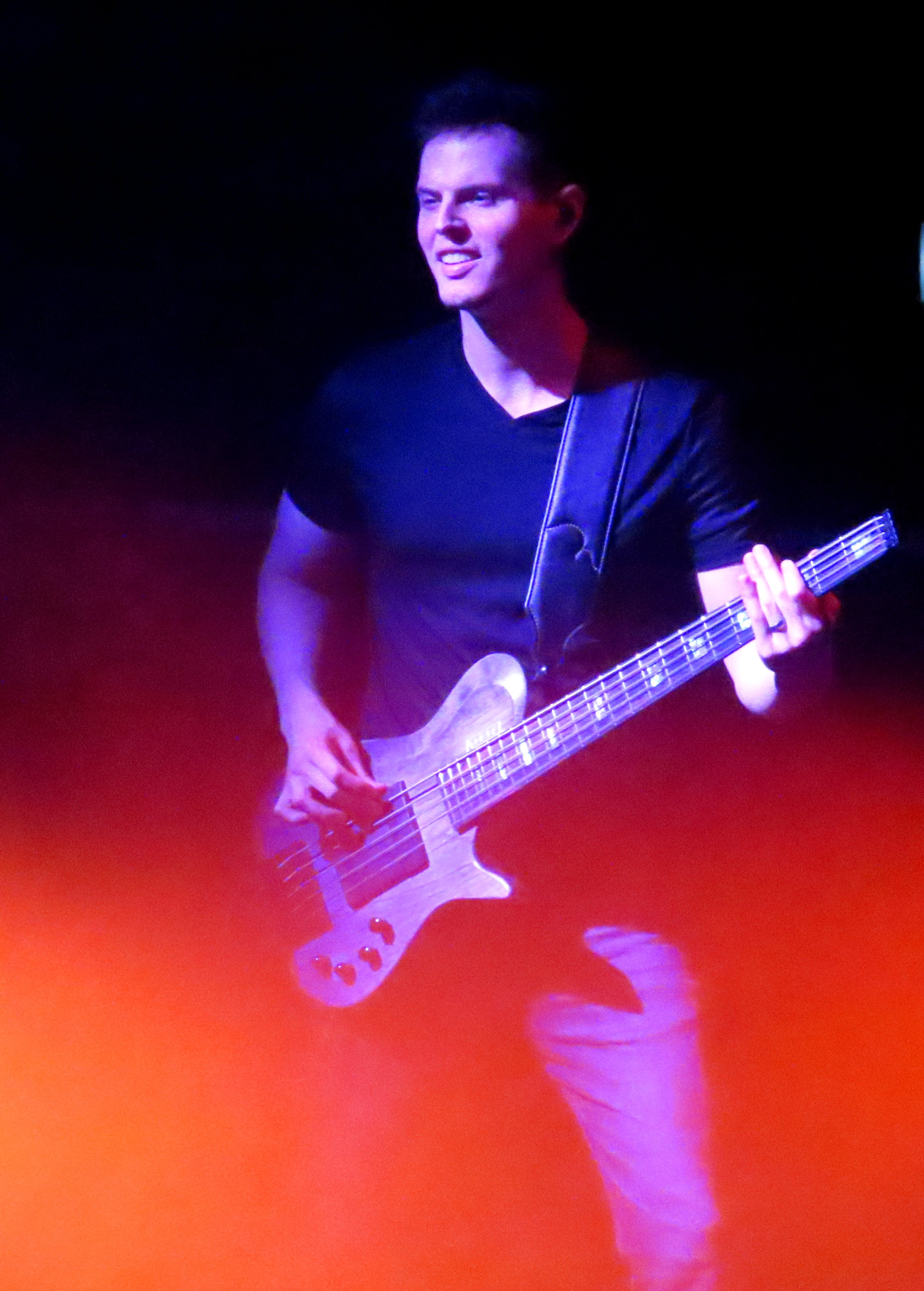
Bassist Nate Navarro toured with Porcupine Tree in 2022 and 2023

On 27 October 2021, Porcupine Tree, Wilson, and Harrison all shared a teaser video and mailing list link across their social media accounts, along with a stylised "P/T C/C" image. On 1 November the band announced their eleventh album, Closure/Continuation, to be released in June 2022 on Music For Nations, along with their first single in over 12 years, "Harridan". The lineup of the band now features just Wilson, Harrison, and Barbieri, with guitarist Randy McStine and bassist Nathan Navarro being added to the touring lineup. The album was recorded over 11 years in complete secrecy. Wilson explained Edwin's absence with the two losing contact when the project went on hiatus, and stylistic differences. Barbieri said "It wasn't anything against Colin Edwin. Porcupine Tree just became something different along the way." Closure/Continuation was released on 24 June 2022.

In a March 2022 interview with The Guardian, Wilson addressed the band's future, stating that he was unsure whether this would be the final project by the band or if the reunion would continue past the album. He then stated it was most likely their last album, as he hoped to end the band on a strong note. In a late June 2022 interview with Under the Radar, however, Wilson expressed his interest in making another Porcupine Tree record that would be more keyboard dominant.

The band began the first leg of the Closure/Continuation tour in September 2022, with shows in the United States, Canada, Mexico and Chile. The tour's second leg, starting in October 2022 and carrying through until November 2022, was composed of select cities in Europe and a single performance in the UK at London's Wembley Arena. Wilson later noted that the band's few 2023 live performances would likely be their last, though he stated that they would like to record again. The show at Ziggo Dome in Amsterdam on 7 November 2022 was filmed and recorded and was released on 8 December 2023 as Closure/Continuation.Live.

In a February 2025 interview with NME, Wilson revealed that the band had continued to work on music, explaining they had enjoyed working on a few songs, and that it was probable, but not yet certain, that it could lead them into another full album. Barbieri echoed these statements and mentioned that the band progressed well, naming 2027 as a viable point in time for release.

== Musical style ==
=== Influences ===
Some of the inherent musical background of Porcupine Tree goes back to Wilson's childhood, when his parents gave Christmas presents to each other. His father received Pink Floyd's The Dark Side of the Moon whilst his mother got Donna Summer's Love to Love You Baby, both of which Wilson listened to heavily. These albums influenced his further songwriting. Other influences include The Beatles, Camel and Karlheinz Stockhausen.

Later in his teens, Wilson briefly became a fan of the new wave of British heavy metal, but as soon as he discovered 1970s music and progressive rock, his interest in metal diminished in favour of experimental music. He later (in the 2000s) discovered bands in the likes of Gojira, Sunn O))), Neurosis, and Meshuggah, which restored his faith in metal music. "For a long time, I couldn't find where all these creative musicians were going...", said Wilson, "and I found them, they were working in extreme metal." Shortly thereafter, he went on to produce three consecutive albums by Swedish progressive death metal band Opeth, which had a considerable influence in his further songwriting.

The influence of electronic music and krautrock is present, with Wilson namechecking bands such as Can, Neu!, Tangerine Dream, Squarepusher, and Aphex Twin and artists such as Klaus Schulze and Conrad Schnitzler, among others. He has mentioned on multiple occasions that he admires the work of American musician Trent Reznor, the founding member of Nine Inch Nails. Wilson has also cited English electronic band Orchestral Manoeuvres in the Dark (OMD), along with other potentially "surprising" influences such as ABBA, The Carpenters, Electric Light Orchestra, and the Saturday Night Fever soundtrack album (1977), largely written and performed by the Bee Gees.

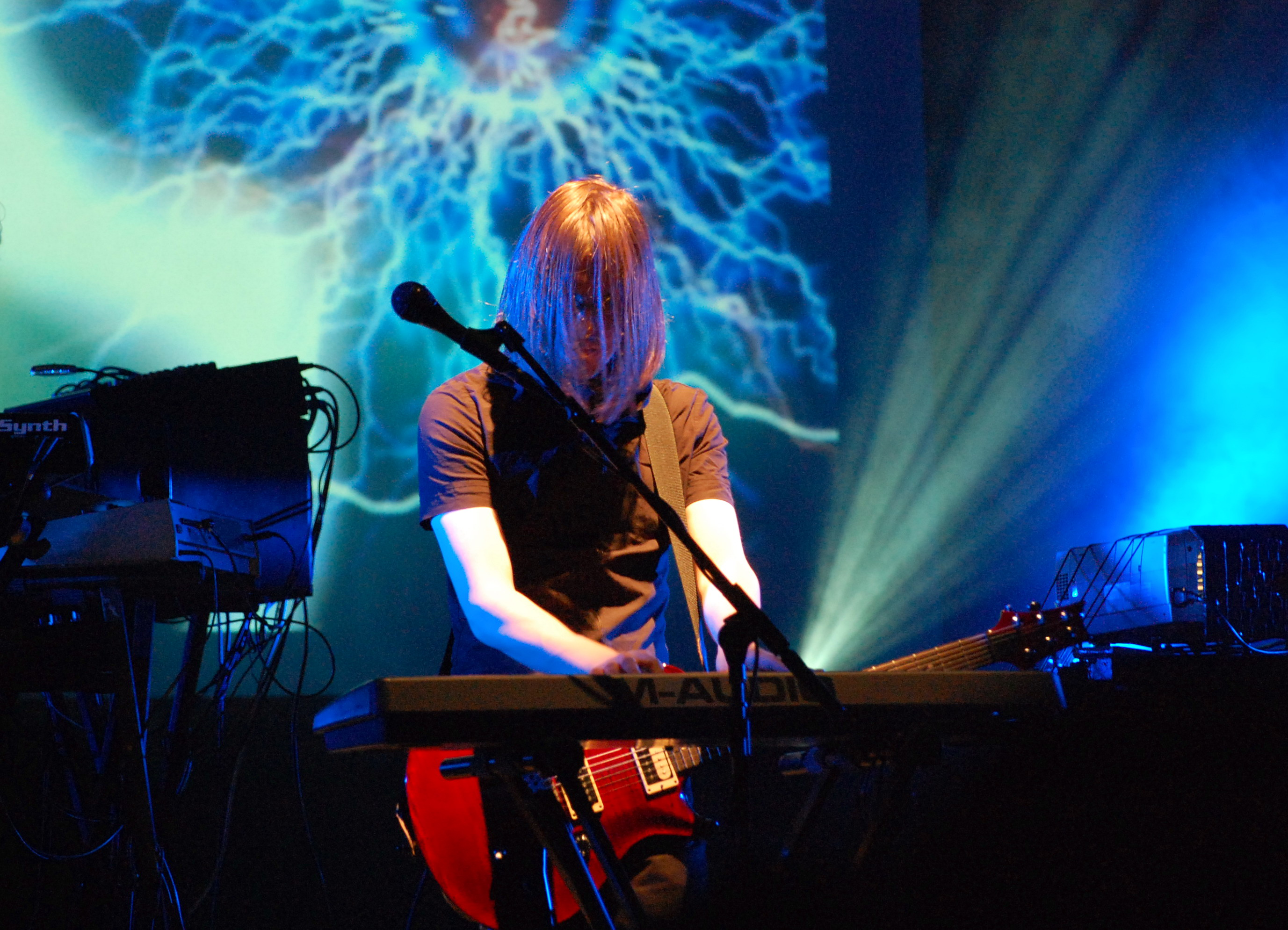
Steven Wilson at Arena, Poznań, Poland, on 28 November 2007

=== Characteristics ===
The music of Porcupine Tree is often described as melancholic. Wilson has stated music is a way for him to channel all his negative feelings, and "an exorcism of those elements within", finding it "easier to write songs about the negative side of the world than it is about the happy side of the world." In the Warszawa live radio broadcast album, before performing "Stop Swimming", Wilson can be heard saying "the saddest music is often the most beautiful."

Porcupine Tree is an album-oriented band, making records where many songs are related to each other. Wilson has said:

"The important thing with Porcupine Tree is that all our songs have a unique sound world that they inhabit. I don't like the idea of any song sounding like any other song. So most of the time it's a case of finding the sound world first whether it be a texture or a drum rhythm that sets you off on a certain musical path, or particular musical atmosphere, or flavour."

For their recordings, the band has included mellotron, banjo, hammered dulcimer, and guimbri, among other instruments unusual for rock bands.

Above all, Porcupine Tree's music has maintained a strong textural and experimental quality, often fusing many genres in a single track. The band's work is noted for its atmospheric nature, largely due to Barbieri's keyboard style and sound-processing abilities, and Wilson's cinematic scope, as a declared fan of American filmmaker David Lynch, whose films are renowned for their sonic content. "Very layered, very produced, very arranged and [with] complex arrangements" is the way Wilson describes the sound of the band. Apart from their regular edition, the albums Stupid Dream, Lightbulb Sun, In Absentia, Deadwing, Fear of a Blank Planet, and The Incident are available in DTS (5.1 Surround Sound) mix; this mixing technique has become a tradition for the band in recent years.

The band's live performances have also been praised, with MusicRadar placing them fourth in their list of "The 30 greatest live acts in the world today" in 2010.

Porcupine Tree are often categorised as a progressive rock band. Although many listeners familiar with the group label them as such, Steven Wilson has been noted in the past to express a certain dislike for the use of the term "progressive" to refer to them. However, more recently, he made note that he has since become more relaxed toward the word considering it is becoming "a much broader term" as time passes, and explaining that to him progressive means "constantly evolving". He has frequently stated that he dislikes the press comparing Porcupine Tree with neo prog bands or citing them as 'the New Pink Floyd'.

== Legacy ==
Porcupine Tree have influenced a new generation of artists and bands.

Anders Nyström of the Swedish group Katatonia has cited the work of Porcupine Tree as a large influence for the band in their post-death metal eras. Luc Lemay, leader of the technical death metal band Gorguts, said that The Incident was "a big revelation" for him, inspiring his more recent songwriting. He singled out the concert of its tour as one of the two most important he has attended. Electronic producer Seven Lions also cited them as an inspiration for his dubstep and drum and bass compositions.

In addition to those artists who state that Porcupine Tree has been a direct influence on their own careers, other artists have been quoted expressing admiration for their work including Neil Peart, Alex Lifeson, Adrian Belew, Jordan Rudess, Mike Portnoy, Arjen Lucassen, Rob Swire, Haken and many others.

Metal Hammer considers them to be among the greatest progressive metal acts of all time.

== Band members ==
Members

- Steven Wilson – vocals, guitars, bass, keyboards, various instruments (1987–2010, 2021–present)
- Richard Barbieri – synthesizers, keyboards, piano, sound processing (1993–2010, 2021–present)
- Gavin Harrison – drums, percussion (2002–2010, 2021–present)

Touring members

- Randy McStine – guitar, backing vocals (2022–present)
- Nate Navarro – bass (2022–present)

Former members

- Colin Edwin – bass, double bass, giumbri, drum machine (1993–2010)
- Chris Maitland – drums, percussion, backing vocals (1993–2002)
- Malcolm Stocks – vocals, experimental guitar (1987) (collaborator only)

Former touring members

- John Wesley – guitar, backing vocals (2002–2010)

== Discography ==
Studio albums

- On the Sunday of Life... (1992)
- Up the Downstair (1993)
- The Sky Moves Sideways (1995)
- Signify (1996)
- Stupid Dream (1999)
- Lightbulb Sun (2000)
- In Absentia (2002)
- Deadwing (2005)
- Fear of a Blank Planet (2007)
- The Incident (2009)
- Closure/Continuation (2022)
