= In Absentia =

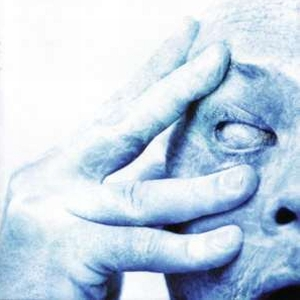

Studio album by Porcupine Tree
- Released: 24 September 2002
- Recorded: March–April 2002
- Studios: Avatar (New York, New York)
- Genres: Progressive rock; progressive metal; alternative metal
- Length: 68:20
- Label: Lava
- Producer: Steven Wilson

Porcupine Tree chronology
Lightbulb Sun (2000)	In Absentia (2002)	Deadwing (2005)

Complete release chronology
Stars Die: The Delerium Years 1991–1997 (2002)	In Absentia (2002)	XM (2003)

Singles from In Absentia
- 1. "Blackest Eyes" Released: 7 April 2003

In Absentia is the seventh studio album by British progressive rock band Porcupine Tree, first released on 24 September 2002. The album marked several changes for the band, with it being the first with new drummer Gavin Harrison and the first to move into a more progressive metal direction, contrary to past albums' psychedelic and alternative rock sounds. Additionally, it was their first release on a major record label, Lava Records. It was very well received critically and commercially, with it often being considered the band's crowning achievement, and selling three times as many copies as any of the band's earlier albums.

== Background ==
=== Writing and recording ===
In the band's earlier years, while under Delerium Records, the band's music typically possessed more extended and abstract qualities typically associated with psychedelic rock and space rock. The band shifted their sound in the late 1990s when signing to Kscope/Snapper Record labels, to a more commercial, radio friendly sound that entailed shorter compositions and traditional song structures, while retaining progressive rock qualities as well. However, by around 2001, they had again outgrown a smaller record label, and after changing labels again to Lava Records, decided to move in a more progressive metal direction. The band had originally been opposed to major record labels, believing that most labels didn't "get" the band, and their emphasis on albums over singles approach in this era of music. However, they chose Lava because they appeared to support this philosophy, frontman Steven Wilson attributing this due to other bands, namely Tool and Radiohead, achieving success with the same mindset.

A number of other factors affected the change in sound beyond the change in record label. Many were key personnel changes and relationships. Most prominently was Wilson's rediscovering of heavy metal music through his fascination with Burzum and the book Lords of Chaos, which led him to listen to many extreme metal bands and finally the Swedish acts Meshuggah and Opeth whom he described as "the holy grail" of this new scene (both groups were thanked on In Absentia's sleeve notes). Furthermore, Wilson would end up meeting Mikael Åkerfeldt from Opeth, which occurred when the two were separately interviewed by an interviewer who had interviewed both of them. Impressed with their music, Wilson eventually agreed to produce the next Opeth album, Blackwater Park, which inspired Wilson to move Porcupine Tree in a more metal direction as well.

Another factor in the change of the band's sound was due to Wilson's meeting of Israeli rock singer Aviv Geffen. The two met when Geffen, a fan of Wilson's music, invited Porcupine Tree on a tour in 2000 in support of the band's previous album, Lightbulb Sun. Touring together lead to a separate musical collaboration named Blackfield. Geffen, not being a fan of metal music, kept that project in more of a pop rock genre, sounding more like prior Porcupine Tree albums Stupid Dream and Lightbulb Sun. This gave Wilson an outlet for that side of his music, allowing him to concentrate on more metal sounds with Porcupine Tree without abandoning the prior genre altogether either. Rounding out the changes was the departure of drummer Chris Maitland, with the replacement being Gavin Harrison, who joined in early 2002. Maitland was unable to make a larger commitment with being signed to a major record label, and the band found Harrison's style more fitting to a more metal-sounding album. Wilson summarized the band's changes at the time as:

In Absentia was all written before Gavin came on; even the drum parts were kind of programmed. But it's one of those times sometimes in life when everything comes together. I'd written these songs and I was very much more interested at that time—having worked with Opeth—in the idea of combining a more kind of brutal or metal aspect back again into the fabric of the music. At the same time Gavin came along and Gavin was a very different drummer to our previous drummer, Chris Maitland. He was much more of a powerhouse and he was much more technical. He had more of a contemporary edge to his sound so it was just one of those really lucky things that he just came in and he played those songs and just blew everyone away and everything just kind of came together. And of course it was the first record we made for our new label and we got signed to a big American label for the first time [Lava Records]. Gavin was the final piece of that equation in a way—he just totally raised the bar in terms of not just the drumming but just the musicianship right throughout the band. Everyone was listening to Gavin and saying, "Fuck, wow. We really need to step up our game."

After the recording process was complete, Steven Wilson then took the album to Larrabee Studios in Los Angeles to work with Tim Palmer and his engineer Mark O'donoughue mixing the record on the J-Series SSL console.

=== Concept ===
While not a formal concept album, many of the songs still have common themes related to serial killers, youthful innocence gone wrong, and criticisms of the modern world. Wilson said of the title:

"It comes from... It's related to some of the lyrics. It's about people on the fringes, on the edges of humanity and society. I have an interest in serial killers, child molesters, and wife beaters... Not in what they did, but in the psychology of why. What caused them to become unhinged and twisted? Why are they unable to empathise? It's [In Absentia] sort of a metaphor - there's something missing, a black hole, a cancer in their soul. It's an absence in the soul."

The album's title evokes the same theme, with the phrase being Latin for "in absence" or "in one's absence", a term often used in relation to criminal proceedings that occur despite the absence of the defendant.

== Release and promotion ==
The album was released on 24 September 2002 on CD and vinyl formats, the latter containing bonus track "Chloroform" after "The Creator Has a Mastertape." A few weeks prior to the album's release, a sampler containing "Blackest Eyes" and shortened versions of "Trains" and "Strip the Soul" was released. The opening track, "Blackest Eyes", was picked up for airplay by major rock radio stations, and it was released in April 2003 for US, although it didn't chart. The band toured in support of the album with the band Yes. This is something Wilson would later regret doing, stating that the audiences of the two bands were too different, stating " the problem was that most of the people who came to see Yes had stopped caring about new music many years before and were really there just to hear their favourite Yes oldies." The band would later do a second tour in support of the album with Opeth as well. During this tour, in July and August 2003, the band released the Futile EP, which included songs recorded during the In Absentia recording sessions. In 2017, Kscope purchased the album as well as the follow-up Deadwing and re-mastered both for 2018 release on Kscope Records citing less compression and overall improvement in sound quality. On 21 February 2020, Kscope released a four-disc deluxe edition of In Absentia. The first disc features Steven Wilson's 2017 mix of the album, the second disc features additional studio recordings omitted from the finished album, the third disc comprises over 70 minutes of demos recorded at Wilson's home studio, and the fourth disc is a Blu-ray that features a 109-minute documentary chronicling the making of the album. The entire deluxe edition is housed in a 100-page hardback book filled with exclusive content.

== Reception ==
Professional ratings
Review scores
Source	Rating
AllMusic	4/5 stars
The Guardian	3/5 stars
PopMatters	(favourable)
Rock Hard	9/10 stars
Rolling Stone	3/5 stars
Sea of Tranquility	5/5 stars
Ultimate Guitar	9.7/10

Reception for the album has been positive. It was Metal Storm's number 2 of the Top 20 albums of 2002 and number 46 on the Top 200 albums of all time. AllMusic strongly praised the album, stating that overall, the album "...has the most immediate appeal of anything Wilson has released under this moniker up to this point. By keeping the songs at manageable lengths and avoiding the avant-garde electronica flourishes of the band's early days, Porcupine Tree has grown into a fully realized pop group without cutting any of the elements that also make them an important force in the neo-prog movement." Billboard stated that "with In Absentia, the group delivers a jarring tour-de-force, replete with strong songs, cryptic lyrical musings, virtuoso musicianship, and lush orchestration." PopMatters similarly praised it, calling it "...an impressive album that drips with [King] Crimson's progressive rock influence. But what sets this album apart is that Steven Wilson, the band's frontman who wrote the songs and produced the album, was clearly set upon constructing intelligent popular music."

The surround sound version of the album won the award for best 5.1 mix at the 2004 Surround Sound Music awards in Los Angeles.

In a 2009 interview, Wilson acknowledged that both he and his general fanbase have come to view the album as the crowning achievement and best album of his career so far.

By April 2004, the album had sold over 100,000 copies worldwide, which was stated to be over three times more than any of their prior albums. The album sold 45,000 copies in the United States alone, compared to the 2,000 copy range of prior albums. As of 2005, it had sold 120,000 copies.

== Track listing ==
All tracks are written by Steven Wilson, except where noted.

No.	Title	Music	Length
1.	"Blackest Eyes"		4:23
2.	"Trains"		5:56
3.	"Lips of Ashes"		4:39
4.	"The Sound of Muzak"		4:59
5.	"Gravity Eyelids"		7:56
6.	"Wedding Nails" (instrumental)	Richard Barbieri, Wilson	6:33
7.	"Prodigal"		5:32
8.	".3"		5:25
9.	"The Creator Has a Mastertape"		5:21
10.	"Heartattack in a Layby"		4:15
11.	"Strip the Soul"	Colin Edwin, Wilson	7:21
12.	"Collapse the Light Into Earth"		5:54
Total length:			68:14

European special edition Released on 27 January 2003, it contains a bonus disc with three extra tracks.
No.	Title	Music	Length
1.	"Drown with Me"	Wilson	5:21
2.	"Chloroform"	Chris Maitland, Wilson	7:14
3.	"Strip the Soul" (Video edit)	Edwin, Wilson	3:35

DVD-A release Released in March 2004, the album was re-released on the DVD-A format, featuring the original album, the two special edition songs recorded during the sessions, ("Drown with Me" and "Chloroform"), and an additional song ("Futile"), all remixed in 5.1 surround sound, and the music videos for "Strip the Soul", "Blackest Eyes", and "Wedding Nails".

2020 Deluxe edition - Bonus Material
No.	Title	Length
1.	"Collapse Intro"	1:45
2.	"Drown With Me"	5:21
3.	"Orchidia"	3:25
4.	"Chloroform"	7:14
5.	"Futile"	6:03
6.	"Meantime"	3:17
7.	"Blackest Eyes" (radio edit)	3:38
8.	"Trains" (radio edit)	3:57
9.	"Strip the Soul" (video edit)	3:35

2020 Deluxe edition - Demos
No.	Title	Length
1.	"Drown With Me" (demo)	5:06
2.	"Trains" (demo)	6:05
3.	"Imogen Slaughter"	2:38
4.	"Watching You Sleep"	3:44
5.	"The Creator Has a Mastertape" (demo)	6:07
6.	"Heartattack in a Layby" (demo)	5:51
7.	"Strip the Soul" (demo)	15:19
8.	"Sound of Muzak" (demo)	5:32
9.	"Gravity Eyelids" (demo)	7:15
10.	"Enough"	3:45
11.	"Wedding Nails" (demo)	6:26
12.	"Blackest Eyes" (demo)	4:34

2020 Deluxe edition - Blu-Ray
No.	Title	Length
1.	"In Absentia documentary" (directed by Lasse Hoile)	1:49:45
2.	"In Absentia remastered" (96/24 LPCM stereo)
3.	"In Absentia Bonus Material" (96/24 LPCM stereo)
4.	"In Absentia 5.1 surround sound mix" (including three bonus tracks 48/24)

== Personnel ==
Porcupine Tree

- Steven Wilson – vocals, acoustic & electric guitar, piano, keyboards, banjo
- Richard Barbieri – analog synths, mellotron, hammond organ, keyboards
- Colin Edwin – bass
- Gavin Harrison – drums, percussion

Additional musicians

- Aviv Geffen – backing vocals (on "The Sound of Muzak" and "Prodigal")
- John Wesley – backing vocals (on "Blackest Eyes", "The Sound of Muzak", and "Prodigal"), additional guitar (on "Blackest Eyes")

Production

- Arranged by Porcupine Tree
- Produced by Steven Wilson
- Engineered by Paul Northfield
- Recording (John Wesley's guitar) by Mark Prator
- Mixed by Tim Palmer and Mark O'Donoughue
- Mastered by Andy VanDette
- Surround Mixes by Elliot Scheiner at the Eyeball, Sept-Dec 2003
- Mastered by Darcy Proper, Sony Studios, NYC, Jan 2004
- dts Encoding by David Duncan
- DVD Produced by Jeff Levison
- Executive Producer for DTSE: Jeff Skillen

== Charts ==
Chart (2003–2020)	Peak position
French Albums (SNEP)	143
German Albums (Offizielle Top 100)	58
