= Closure/Continuation.Live =

Live album by Porcupine Tree
- Released: 8 December 2023
- Recorded: 7 November 2022
- Venues: Ziggo Dome, Amsterdam, Netherlands
- Genre: Progressive rock
- Length: 149:24
- Label: Music for Nations
- Producers: Steven Wilson; Gavin Harrison

Porcupine Tree chronology
Closure/Continuation (2022)	Closure/Continuation.Live (2023)

Singles from Closure/Continuation.Live
- 1. "Harridan" Released: 6 November 2023; 2. "Fear of a Blank Planet" Released: 1 December 2023

Closure/Continuation.Live.Amsterdam 07/11/22 (often shortened to simply Closure/Continuation.Live) is a live album by British progressive rock band Porcupine Tree, first released on 8 December 2023. It features the band's concert to a sold-out crowd at the Ziggo Dome in Amsterdam, Netherlands on 7 November 2022.

The set list of the concert features every track from the standard edition of the band's most recent (and first in well over 12 years) studio album Closure/Continuation. Alongside the album, a concert film documenting the performance, was also released.

== Release ==
The record was released as a 2CD, 1 Blu-Ray & 1 DVD (the Blu-Ray featuring the record in Dolby Atmos, 5.1, and Hi-Res & the DVD with 5.1 and Hi-Res stereo) 4LP, and 60 page hardcover book box set, as well as on digital services. Two singles were released in promotion of the album's release, "Harridan" on 6 November 2023 and "Fear of a Blank Planet" on 1 December 2023.

== Track listing ==
All tracks are written by Steven Wilson unless stated.

Closure/Continuation.Live track listing
No.	Title	Writer(s)	Album	Length
1.	"Blackest Eyes"		In Absentia (2002)	5:23
2.	"Harridan"	Gavin Harrison; Wilson	Closure/Continuation (2022)	8:07
3.	"Of the New Day"		Closure/Continuation (2022)	4:43
4.	"Rats Return"	Harrison; Wilson	Closure/Continuation (2022)	5:15
5.	"Even Less"		Stupid Dream (1999)	6:55
6.	"Drown With Me"		In Absentia (2002)	5:26
7.	"Dignity"	Richard Barbieri; Wilson	Closure/Continuation (2022)	8:35
8.	"The Sound of Muzak"		In Absentia (2002)	5:04
9.	"Last Chance to Evacuate Planet Earth Before It Is Recycled"		Lightbulb Sun (2000)	4:53
10.	"Chimera's Wreck"	Harrison; Wilson	Closure/Continuation (2022)	10:24
11.	"Fear of a Blank Planet"		Fear of a Blank Planet (2007)	9:08
12.	"Buying New Soul"	Wilson; Barbieri; Colin Edwin; Chris Maitland	Recordings (2001)	7:48
13.	"Walk the Plank"	Barbieri; Wilson	Closure/Continuation (2022)	4:28
14.	"Sentimental"		Fear of a Blank Planet (2007)	5:23
15.	"Herd Culling"	Harrison; Barbieri; Wilson	Closure/Continuation (2022)	7:12
16.	"Anesthetize"		Fear of a Blank Planet (2007)	17:25
17.	"I Drive the Hearse"		The Incident (2009)	6:23
18.	"Sleep Together"		Fear of a Blank Planet (2007)	7:57
19.	"Collapse the Light Into Earth"		In Absentia (2002)	5:01
20.	"Halo"	Barbieri; Edwin; Harrison; Wilson	Deadwing (2005)	5:54
21.	"Trains"		In Absentia (2002)	8:00
Total length:				149:24

== Personnel ==
Porcupine Tree

- Steven Wilson – vocals, guitars, keyboards, mixing, production
- Richard Barbieri – keyboards
- Gavin Harrison – drums, mixing, production

Touring

- Randy McStine – guitars, backing vocals
- Nate Navarro – bass

Technical

- Ian Bond – engineering and FOH engineering

== Charts ==
Chart performance for Closure/Continuation.Live
Chart (2023)	Peak position
Belgian Albums (Ultratop Flanders)	159
Dutch Albums (Album Top 100)	55
Scottish Albums (Official Charts)	9
UK Albums (Official Charts)	36
UK Rock & Metal Albums (Official Charts)	1
