= Octane Twisted =

Live album by Porcupine Tree
- Released: 5 November 2012
- Recorded: 30 April 2010; 14 October 2010
- Venues: Riviera Theater, Chicago; Royal Albert Hall, London
- Genres: Progressive rock, progressive metal
- Length: 128:22
- Label: Kscope
- Producers: Steven Wilson; Gavin Harrison; Neil Warnock; Steve Martin; Josh Dick

Porcupine Tree chronology
Atlanta (2010)	Octane Twisted (2012)	Closure/Continuation.Live (2023)

Professional ratings
Review scores
Source	Rating
All About Jazz	(favourable)
Allmusic	3.5/5 stars
PopMatters	(9/10)
Sputnikmusic	3.5/5 stars

Octane Twisted is a live album released by Porcupine Tree on 5 November 2012. It contains a live performance of the band's 2009 album The Incident in its entirety recorded at the Riviera Theater in Chicago on 30 April 2010. The second CD contains other tracks also recorded in Chicago (CD 2, tracks 1–4), along with three songs from the band's (then) final show at the Royal Albert Hall in London on 14 October 2010 (CD 2, tracks 5–7). The initial pressing also included a DVD containing a video of the Incident set.

== Track listing ==
All songs by Steven Wilson unless noted

CD 1
No.	Title	Writer(s)	Length
1.	"Occam's Razor"		2:20
2.	"The Blind House"		5:57
3.	"Great Expectations"		1:26
4.	"Kneel and Disconnect"		2:03
5.	"Drawing the Line"		4:43
6.	"The Incident"		5:19
7.	"Your Unpleasant Family"		1:51
8.	"The Yellow Windows of the Evening Train"		2:01
9.	"Time Flies"		12:07
10.	"Degree Zero of Liberty"		1:45
11.	"Octane Twisted"	Richard Barbieri/Colin Edwin/Gavin Harrison/Wilson	5:03
12.	"The Séance"		2:39
13.	"Circle of Manias"	Barbieri/Edwin/Harrison/Wilson	2:34
14.	"I Drive the Hearse"		6:48

CD 2
No.	Title	Writer(s)	Length
1.	"Hatesong" (From Lightbulb Sun)	Edwin/Wilson	9:57
2.	"Russia on Ice / The Pills I’m Taking" (Russia on Ice from Lightbulb Sun and The Pills I'm Taking is the second part of "Anesthetize" from Fear of a Blank Planet)	Barbieri/Edwin/Chris Maitland/Wilson	15:02
3.	"Stars Die" (From The Sky Moves Sideways)		5:57
4.	"Bonnie the Cat" (From The Incident)	Barbieri/Edwin/Harrison/Wilson	6:11
5.	"Even Less (Full Version)" (From Recordings)		14:27
6.	"Dislocated Day" (From The Sky Moves Sideways)		7:05
7.	"Arriving Somewhere But Not Here" (From Deadwing)		12:58

== Personnel ==
=== Porcupine Tree ===
- Steven Wilson – lead vocals, guitar; mixing
- Colin Edwin – bass guitar
- Richard Barbieri – keyboards, synthesizer
- Gavin Harrison – drums, percussion; mixing
- John Wesley – guitar, backing vocals (touring member)

=== Production ===
- Eric Dorris – DVD director
- Josh Dick – additional production
- Carl Glover – design, photography
- Claudia Hahn – photography
- Lasse Hoile – photography
- Andy Leff – management
- Steve Martin – additional production
- Diana Nitschke – photography
- Neil Warnock – additional production

== Charts ==
Chart (2012)	Peak position
Belgian (Vl) Albums Chart	111
Belgian (Wa) Albums Chart	111
Dutch Albums Chart	68
German Albums Chart	77
Swiss Albums Chart	86
UK Albums Chart	70
