= Arriving Somewhere... =

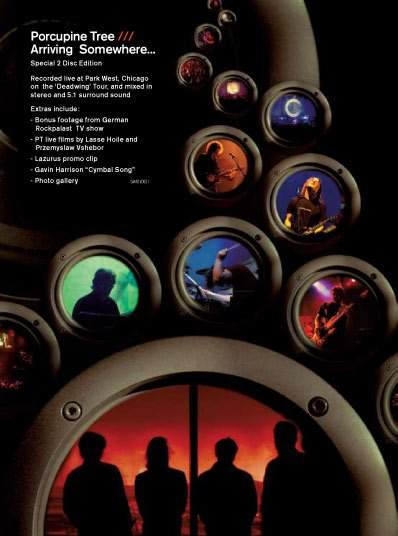

Video by Porcupine Tree
- Released: 21 August 2006; 21 April 2008
- Recorded: 11 and 12 October 2005
- Venue: Park West (Chicago, IL)
- Genre: Progressive rock, progressive metal
- Length: 101:48 (Show)
- Label: Snapper/Kscope
- Director: Lasse Hoile
- Producer: Steven Wilson, Porcupine Tree

Porcupine Tree chronology
Arriving Somewhere... (2006)	Anesthetize (2010)

Arriving Somewhere... is the first live performance DVD by British progressive rock band Porcupine Tree. Disc one is a full show from the Deadwing tour filmed by "Studio M" with nine High Def cameras at Park West, Chicago on 11 and 12 October 2005, edited by Lasse Hoile, with the soundtrack mixed in stereo and 5.1 surround sound by Steven Wilson, and mastered by Darcy Proper. Disc two includes live performances on the German television show Rockpalast, a promotional video for "Lazarus", the live films used as the backdrop for three songs, Gavin Harrison's "Cymbal Song", and a photo gallery with over 100 images. The soundtrack to the DVD is available in FLAC and MP3 formats from the band's download store since April 2007. This audio edition is in the top 10 of the "Top Albums of 2007" chart of Rate Your Music website. The DVD was re-released under Kscope record label on 21 April 2008; it was released on the same day as the regular release for the DVD-A edition of Lightbulb Sun. In March 2018, a Blu-ray and 2CD set was released.

== Critical reception ==
The following are notes written by the press about the DVD and the shows in the context of the Deadwing and Arriving Somewhere DVD tours:

- Time Out (19 May 2005) – "[Steve] Wilson has long demonstrated a knack for reconciling vintage influences with contemporary sounds, while never forgetting the strength of a solid hook... capable of soaring melodies and celestial harmonies"
- Daily Variety (14 June 2005) – "Porcupine Tree... delivered music that was opulent, aggressive, and occasionally haunting yet consistently pristine in the execution"
- The New York Times (10/6/2006) – "Suitelike songs, complex meters, and epic ambitions"
- Boston Herald (10/7/2006) – "In front of a sold-out, intensely devoted crowd at the Berklee Performance Center Thursday night, the... quintet demonstrated its unique gift for shifting sound dynamics with a mind-bending two-hour performance."
- Record Collector – "Captures the Brit quartet at the peak of their powers"
- Sound and Vision (11/10/2006) – "When it comes to surround sound, Porcupine Tree is in a league by itself"

Professional ratings
Review scores
Source	Rating
Blogcritics	Production & Production: (9/10)
Record Collector	5/5 stars
Sound and Vision	Show: DVD Picture/Sound: Extras:

== Track listing ==
=== DVD disc 1 ===
No.	Title	Writer(s)	Original release	Length
1.	"Revenant"	Richard Barbieri	Deadwing bonus track (2005)	3:04
2.	"Open Car"	Steven Wilson	Deadwing	4:46
3.	"Blackest Eyes"	Wilson	In Absentia (2002)	4:41
4.	"Lazarus"	Wilson	Deadwing	4:06
5.	"Hatesong"	Colin Edwin, Wilson	Lightbulb Sun (2000)	9:14
6.	"Don't Hate Me"	Wilson	Stupid Dream (1999)	8:38
7.	"Mother and Child Divided"	Gavin Harrison, Wilson	Deadwing bonus track	5:11
8.	"Buying New Soul"	Barbieri, Edwin, Chris Maitland, Wilson	Recordings (2001)	7:17
9.	"So-Called Friend"	Barbieri, Edwin, Harrison, Wilson	"Lazarus" b-side (2005)	4:55
10.	"Arriving Somewhere but Not Here"	Wilson	Deadwing	12:57
11.	"Heartattack in a Layby"	Wilson	In Absentia	4:07
12.	"Start of Something Beautiful"	Harrison, Wilson	Deadwing	7:19
13.	"Halo"	Barbieri, Edwin, Harrison, Wilson	Deadwing	6:42
14.	"The Sound of Muzak"	Wilson	In Absentia	5:14
15.	"Even Less"	Wilson	Stupid Dream	6:54
16.	"Trains"	Wilson	In Absentia	7:18
17.	"End Credits"	Harrison, Wilson	special alternate mix of "Mother and Child Divided"	2:05

=== DVD disc 2 ===
Bonus disc
No.	Title	Writer(s)	Original release	Length
1.	"Futile" (from Rockpalast broadcast)	Harrison, Wilson	In Absentia bonus track	6:09
2.	"Radioactive Toy" (from Rockpalast broadcast)	Wilson	On the Sunday of Life (1992)	5:59
3.	"Lazarus" (promo clip directed by Lasse Hoile)	Wilson	Deadwing	3:57
4.	"The Start of Something Beautiful" (live film directed by Przemyslaw Vshebor and Lasse Hoile)	Harrison, Wilson	Deadwing	7:10
5.	"Halo" (live film directed by Lasse Hoile)	Barbieri, Edwin, Harrison, Wilson	Deadwing	5:54
6.	"Mother and Child Divided" (live film directed by Lasse Hoile)	Harrison, Wilson	Deadwing bonus track	4:56
7.	"Cymbal Song" (by Gavin Harrison)	Harrison		3:57
8.	"Gallery" (photo gallery with exclusive ambient music by Richard Barbieri & Steven Wilson)	Barbieri, Wilson		9:21

=== CD/downloadable version ===
Soundtrack to the Arriving Somewhere... DVD, recorded at Park West, Chicago on 11–12 October 2005. Mixed by Steven Wilson at No Man's Land Studios, UK. Mastered by Darcy Proper at Galaxy Studios, Belgium.

Disc 1

1. "Revenant" – 3:04
2. "Open Car" – 4:46
3. "Blackest Eyes" – 4:41
4. "Lazarus" – 4:06
5. "Hatesong" – 9:14
6. "Don't Hate Me" – 8:38
7. "Mother and Child Divided" – 5:11
8. "Buying New Soul" – 7:17
9. "So Called Friend" – 4:55

Disc 2

1. "Arriving Somewhere But Not Here" – 12:57
2. "Heartattack in a Layby" – 4:07
3. "Start of Something Beautiful" – 7:19
4. "Halo" – 6:42
5. "The Sound of Muzak" – 5:14
6. "Even Less" – 6:54
7. "Trains" – 7:18
8. End Credits ("Mother and Child Divided") – 2:05

== Personnel ==
Porcupine Tree

- Steven Wilson – lead vocals and guitar
- Colin Edwin – bass
- Richard Barbieri – keyboards
- Gavin Harrison – drums
- John Wesley – guitar, backing vocals (touring member)

== Chart positions ==
Chart	Position
Billboard Comprehensive Music Videos	36
