= Atlanta (Porcupine Tree album) =

Live album by Porcupine Tree
- Released: June 2010
- Recorded: 29 October 2007
- Venue: Roxy Theatre, Atlanta
- Genre: Progressive rock, progressive metal
- Length: 120:32

Porcupine Tree chronology
Ilosaarirock (2009)	Atlanta (2010)	Octane Twisted (2012)

Atlanta is a download only double-live album by British progressive rock band Porcupine Tree recorded at the Roxy Theatre, Atlanta, United States on 29 October 2007. The show recording was initially intended for a prospective Porcupine Tree live album, but this decision was later turned down as development of the Anesthetize DVD project began. In the wake of the news regarding Mick Karn's advanced-stage cancer, the band decided to put it out as a downloadable item from the Burning Shed online store at a very cheap cost, as a .RAR file split in two parts, all in MP3 format at 320 kbit/s with completely printable artwork designed by Carl Glover. The profits from the Atlanta downloads were intended to help Mick pay for his treatment. A 44.1 kHz/24-bit FLAC version was released in August 2010; profits from this version go to the Teenage Cancer Trust. Since the album's artwork and mix is set up for two CDs it is widely considered to be a double album. The album has a somewhat similar track listing to the Anesthetize DVD but includes the first official live recording of the track "A Smart Kid" and some of the songs that were performed at the shows for the Anesthetize shoot, but left out as they were already available on previous live releases (Open Car and Blackest Eyes).

== Track listing ==
All tracks written by Steven Wilson unless otherwise noted

No.	Title	Writer(s)	Length
1.	"Fear of a Blank Planet" (from Fear of a Blank Planet)		9:31
2.	"What Happens Now?" (from Nil Recurring)	Wilson, Barbieri, Edwin, Harrison	8:04
3.	"Sound of Muzak" (from In Absentia)		5:15
4.	"Sentimental" (from Fear of a Blank Planet)		5:36
5.	"Drown With Me" (B-side from In Absentia)		5:51
6.	"Anesthetize" (from Fear of a Blank Planet)		17:30
7.	"Open Car" (from Deadwing)		4:44
8.	"Dark Matter" (from Signify)		8:51
9.	"Cheating the Polygraph" (from Nil Recurring)	Wilson, Harrison	8:37
10.	"A Smart Kid" (from Stupid Dream)		5:30
11.	"Blackest Eyes" (from In Absentia)		4:58
12.	"Half-Light" (B-side from Deadwing)		5:58
13.	"Way Out of Here" (from Fear of a Blank Planet)	Barbieri, Edwin, Harrison, Wilson	7:41
14.	"Sleep Together" (from Fear of a Blank Planet)		8:46
15.	"Even Less" (from Stupid Dream)		6:11
16.	"Halo" (from Deadwing)	Wilson, Barbieri, Edwin, Harrison	7:29
Total length:			2:00:32

== Personnel ==
- Steven Wilson – keyboards, vocals, guitar
- Colin Edwin – bass guitar
- Richard Barbieri – keyboards, synthesizers
- Gavin Harrison – drums
- John Wesley – guitar, backing vocals (touring member)
