= Closure/Continuation =

Studio album by Porcupine Tree
- Released: 24 June 2022
- Recorded: 2011–September 2021
- Studio: Home Studios of each band member
- Genre: Progressive rock
- Length: 48:01
- Label: Music for Nations
- Producers: Steven Wilson; Richard Barbieri; Gavin Harrison

Porcupine Tree chronology
The Incident (2009)	Closure/Continuation (2022)

Singles from Closure/Continuation
- 1. "Harridan" Released: 1 November 2021; 2. "Of the New Day" Released: 8 March 2022; 3. "Herd Culling" Released: 20 May 2022; 4. "Rats Return" Released: 17 June 2022

Closure/Continuation is the eleventh studio album by British progressive rock band Porcupine Tree. It is their first since 2009's The Incident. Despite public uncertainty of the band's future after frontman Steven Wilson's focus on a solo career in 2010, the album was recorded intermittently in complete secrecy among Wilson, Gavin Harrison, and Richard Barbieri across the course of the following decade, without longtime bassist Colin Edwin. With the COVID-19 pandemic putting members' separate plans on hold, the band found time to finish the record in September 2021. Towards the end of the year, the band's reformation was announced, alongside the album's release date of 24 June 2022. Four singles were released ahead of the record—"Harridan", "Of the New Day", "Herd Culling", and "Rats Return".

The album debuted at number two on the UK Albums Chart and reached number one in Germany, the Netherlands and Switzerland.

== Background ==
After Porcupine Tree finished the touring cycle for their tenth album, The Incident (2009) in 2010, frontman Steven Wilson felt the need to focus on other musical projects. Wilson felt creatively constrained by the public expectation of what Porcupine Tree music should sound like, and privately resented by the rest of the band, who he felt were upset that Wilson was getting most of the credit for the band's accomplishments and musicianship. Without a specific plan on how to handle the band, Wilson spent the following year recording and releasing his second solo album, Grace for Drowning (2011), and Blackfield's third album, Welcome to My DNA (2011). Initially, Wilson mentioned the possibility of working on new music in early 2012, with drummer Gavin Harrison later estimating that recording would occur across 2012 and release 2013. Plans shortly changed though, with Wilson unexpectedly announcing that he would be focusing on recording, releasing, and touring in support of a third solo album, an effort that would keep him busy through the entirety of 2013.

Wilson kept in regular contact with Harrison, so he remained unbothered, but other members became dismayed and resentful that they had been left behind by Wilson. In particular, Wilson lost complete contact with bassist Colin Edwin, while keyboardist Richard Barbieri privately became upset that Wilson publicly pushed aside the band. Publicly, Wilson still maintained that the band "haven't split up" and that there are "no intentions of splitting up", but also said there were no specific plans for a new album either. He also explained that his uncertainty of what direction the band should go musically also complicated moving forward, noting that he was tired of the metal musical direction the band prior few albums had taken, and that at least one band member did not appreciate the jazz music direction that some of his solo music had taken at the time. When asked if the band may never reform, Wilson responded that he honestly didn't know, and really just wanted to continue to focus on his solo albums for the time being. Midway through 2013, Wilson reiterated the band's status, stating that it's "not to say the band has broken up or anything like that. It's always conceivable that we could get back together in a year or five years, or 10 years. I really can't say – there are no plans at the moment." Edwin separately reiterated the same stance.

Wilson proceeded with his solo career, including The Raven That Refused to Sing (And Other Stories) (2013) and Hand. Cannot. Erase. (2015). Publicly, Wilson's stance on the band varied, but generally soured over time. In 2015, he noted that if the band returned, it would just be a "side-project" to his solo career. In 2016, he noted that there was a "strong possibility" of Porcupine Tree reforming some day, but later in the year, on the same topic, responded "you'd be waiting for a long time, that band [Porcupine Tree] doesn't exist anymore." In 2017, Wilson reiterated his solo career being the priority, because "[his] solo project has taken off" and "fulfills the musical needs [he has] now." The following year, he went as far as to say that the odds of the band reforming were "zero" and "finished" because he was "not interested in moving backwards", instead preferring to explore new musical styles with various other musicians in his solo work. Years later, Wilson again reversed his stance, suggesting that it was possible and would happen when least expected. In November 2021, the band officially announced they were not only reforming, but a new album, revealed to be named Closure/Continuation, had already been completed in secrecy in September 2021.

== Writing and recording ==
The album was entirely created in complete secrecy over the course of a decade. None of the material originated as content left over from their prior album, The Incident. Unlike prior albums, where Wilson would write and demo extensively himself before presenting it to the band, Closure/Continuation was written collaboratively. Harrison noted that earliest work on the album began as early as 2011, when he and Wilson, living close to one another, still met up to talk and spend time together. Harrison recounted that on one of those dates, Wilson happened to pick up a bass guitar lying around, and started playing it on a whim. This ended up resulting in some extended jam sessions between the two - Wilson on bass and Harrison on drums. The result was far different than when the band had previously attempted to jam and improvise - Wilson usually played guitar, not bass, and they both found it much easier to experiment with ideas with only two instruments being played, rather than the busier four-person sessions of the past. The two recorded the jam sessions, and then Wilson would review them and attempt to take segments and later work them into songs. The earliest iterations of the track "Harridan" and "Chimera's Wreck" originated from these sessions. Barbieri would later join the sessions with his keyboard playing as well, but Wilson continued to perform on the bass, eventually writing a majority of the album on bass, and later recording all bass parts.

Every aspect of the album was recorded by either Wilson, Harrison, and Barbieri; with the album featuring no guest musicians or contributions from Edwin. Upon writing and demoing the basis of the album among the three members, Wilson opted to take care of bass recording himself, feeling his style of playing the bass more like a guitarist was too different in style from Edwin. With the writing sessions also more focused around the idea of collaboration, they felt it against the spirit of the album to force Edwin to record music he hadn't collaborated on himself. Outside of "Of The New Day", which was written by Wilson alone, all other songs were collaborations among at least two members, an approach that was different from prior albums, but deemed necessary by Wilson, who felt that the music would become too similar to his solo work if he simply wrote everything. "Harridan", "Chimera's Wreck", and "Rats Return" were written by Wilson and Harrison, "Dignity" and "Walk the Plank" were written by Wilson and Barbieri, and "Herd Culling" was written by all three. "Herd Culling" was initially a Wilson and Harrison creation that Barbieri struggled to contribute to, until he decided to expand onto it as an outro rather than over the work of Wilson and Harrison. "Harridan" and "Chimera's Wreck" were the earliest created songs, being conceived just a few years after the release of The Incident, while "Herd Culling" was the last song to be created, during a COVID-19 lockdown. Wilson noted that the decade-spanning recording sessions did result in some oddities; one particular line from "Harridan" features two vocal takes done a decade apart.

Wilson, Harrison, and Barbieri would continue to revisit the material off and on over the years, in-between their own individual projects. Harrison noted that at times months or even year long gaps of inactivity occurred. Barbieri became more proactive in his work around 2016, when the band became more serious about completing the material into a full-length album. In 2019, just prior to the beginning of the COVID-19 pandemic, the band had a meeting about scheduling time to finally complete the album, though it wasn't until the extended downtime created by the COVID-19 lockdowns that the three were finally able to put aside enough dedicated time to finish it. The band noted:

"'Harridan' and a few of the other new songs have been in play since shortly after the release of The Incident. They initially lived on a hard drive in a slowly growing computer file marked PT2012, later renamed PT2015, PT2018, and so on. There were times when we even forgot they were there, and times when they nagged us to finish them to see where they would take us. Listening to the finished pieces, it was clear that this wasn't like any of our work outside of the band – the combined DNA of the people behind the music meant these tracks were forming what was undeniably, unmistakably, obviously a Porcupine Tree record."

Wilson and Harrison expressed their contentment with the making of the album, having written it with complete creative control, on their own time-table, without intervention from a record label, and not created out of a necessity for money or fame due to their separate projects having failed.

== Themes and composition ==
While the album is not a concept album and has no overarching central theme, the album's title is self-referential to the band's reunion. It refers to the uncertainty of the band as to whether the album is wrapping up their career as "closure", or if it is a new beginning and a "continuation" into further music together. The album was written so that it could conceptually serve either scenario. Wilson's lyrics in "Chimera's Wreck" were inspired by the death of his father in 2011; the original lyrics directly addressed the topic, while the final version grew into a more general existential reflection on mortality. "Herd Culling" was inspired by reports of paranormal activity at Skinwalker Ranch and people's reactions to similar situations, though Wilson addressed and appreciated that listeners interpret it to be about issues of violence and paranoia in modern society. Wilson described "Rats Return" as being about "politicians who express having an interest in the public, but when it comes down to it, only want to save themselves". He noted it was inspired by the depression felt by "having lived through Brexit, Trump, and Boris Johnson".

Musically, the band also made effort not to write any particular songs with pop music or single appeal or radio airplay, instead focusing on the album on a collective work. Wilson also purposely lessened the heavy metal music influence seen in the band's prior four albums, as he had grown tired of the sound and style. The album features some heavier guitar riffs, but less than the prior four albums, and one track, "Walk the Plank", features no guitar at all. The song "Of the New Day" was noted to sound like the music from the band's Stupid Dream (1999) and Lightbulb Sun (2000) albums, and according to Wilson and Harrison, features 42 time signature changes across the course of the song.

== Promotion and release ==
After a decade without any public developments by the band, activity started up in late 2021. After multiple days of cryptic teasers from band and band member social media accounts, the band announced their reformation, the name of the album they had been recording in secrecy, Closure/Continuation, and a supporting tour in late 2022. Wilson, Harrison and Barbieri were announced as the band's returning members, with long-time bassist Colin Edwin not returning. Wilson noted this was a combination of the band members losing contact with Edwin, and that Wilson himself had written and recorded the album's bass parts anyway. Guitarist Randy McStine and bassist Nate Navarro were recruited to round out the touring lineup. Previous touring guitarist John Wesley was not asked to return, with the band opting to recruit multi-instrumentalists whose versatility could help in using fewer backing tracks in the live performances. The band plans on performing the entire album at each show, but not as a whole, but rather, interspersed with other songs largely from their In Absentia (2002) and Fear of a Blank Planet (2007) albums. Audio from every performance will be recorded by the band.

The album was released on 24 June 2022. The Designers Republic's Ian Anderson provided the album's artwork. The first single, "Harridan", was released on 1 November 2021. A second single, "Of the New Day", was released in March 2022. Songs "Herd Culling" and "Rats Return" were also released ahead of the album in May and June respectively.

== Reception ==
Professional ratings
Aggregate scores
Source	Rating
Metacritic	71/100
Review scores
Source	Rating
AllMusic	3/5 stars
Classic Rock	4/5 stars
The Guardian	3/5 stars
Metal Injection	9/10
Pitchfork	6.9/10
PopMatters	6/10 stars
Record Collector	4/5 stars
Slant Magazine	3/5 stars
Sputnikmusic	4/5
Uncut	7/10

Prior to publication, Loudwire named the album one of their most anticipated rock and metal albums in 2022. Upon release, the album was generally well-received, getting an average rating of 71 out of 100 on Metacritic, based on nine reviews. Metal Injection praised the album for being "an outstanding and endearing comeback...while it doesn't bring anything new to the table...what it does accomplish and induce is quite exemplary". AllMusic concluded that the album was "A welcome new entry in PT's catalog" that shows that "the band have plenty left to say". Record Collector noted that while the album "perhaps misses the conceptual cogency of earlier Tree peaks", ultimately it "weds a reinvigorated affirmation of band identity to expansive energies, all to confident effect".

It was ranked as the 16th best guitar album of 2022 by Guitar World readers.

== Commercial performance ==
At the mid-week mark, Closure/Continuation was on track to debut at the number one spot on the UK all-format album chart, potentially the band's first album to top the chart. The album ultimately debuted at number two in the official UK album charts, though it debuted at number one for both CD and vinyl sales.

== Track listing ==
Physical standard edition and 5.1 Blu-Ray (box set only)
No.	Title	Writer(s)	Length
1.	"Harridan"	Gavin Harrison, Steven Wilson	8:07
2.	"Of the New Day"	Wilson	4:43
3.	"Rats Return"	Harrison, Wilson	5:40
4.	"Dignity"	Richard Barbieri, Wilson	8:22
5.	"Herd Culling"	Harrison, Barbieri, Wilson	7:03
6.	"Walk the Plank"	Barbieri, Wilson	4:27
7.	"Chimera's Wreck"	Harrison, Wilson	9:39
Total length:			48:01

Digital standard and physical deluxe edition bonus tracks
No.	Title	Writer(s)	Length
8.	"Population Three" (instrumental)	Harrison, Wilson	6:51
9.	"Never Have"	Wilson	5:07
10.	"Love in the Past Tense"	Harrison, Wilson	5:49
Total length:			65:48

Box set bonus CD
No.	Title	Music	Length
1.	"Population Three"	Harrison, Wilson
2.	"Never Have"	Wilson
3.	"Love in the Past Tense"	Harrison, Wilson
4.	"Harridan" (instrumental)
5.	"Of the New Day" (instrumental)
6.	"Rats Return" (instrumental)
7.	"Dignity" (instrumental)
8.	"Herd Culling" (instrumental)
9.	"Walk the Plank" (instrumental)
10.	"Chimera's Wreck" (instrumental)
Total length:			65:48

== Personnel ==
Personnel per album liner notes

Porcupine Tree

- Steven Wilson – vocals, guitars, bass, piano, mixing, design concept, production
- Richard Barbieri – keyboards, synthesisers, production
- Gavin Harrison – drums, percussion, drum mixing, production

Additional personnel

- Lisen Rylander Löve – voice sample (track 4)
- Suzanne Barbieri – voice sample (track 4)
- Inspector J – ambience field recording (track 4)
- Klankbeeld – ambience field recording sample (track 7)

Production

- Ian Anderson of The Designers Republic – art direction, image editor, photography, graphic design, creative director
- Paul Stacey – additional guitar recording
- Ed Scull – additional guitar recording engineering
- Penny Morgan, Peter Rudge, Pro Music Management – management

== Charts ==
=== Weekly charts ===
Weekly chart performance for Closure/Continuation
Chart (2022)	Peak position
Australian Albums (ARIA)	13
Austrian Albums (Ö3 Austria)	4
Belgian Albums (Ultratop Flanders)	11
Belgian Albums (Ultratop Wallonia)	3
Canadian Albums (Billboard)	76
Danish Albums (Hitlisten)	20
Dutch Albums (Album Top 100)	1
Finnish Albums (Suomen virallinen lista)	2
French Albums (SNEP)	24
German Albums (Offizielle Top 100)	1
Irish Albums (Official Charts)	42
Italian Albums (FIMI)	4
New Zealand Albums (RMNZ)	24
Norwegian Albums (VG-lista)	25
Polish Albums (ZPAV)	5
Portuguese Albums (AFP)	7
Scottish Albums (Official Charts)	1
Spanish Albums (Promusicae)	7
Swedish Albums (Sverigetopplistan)	13
Swiss Albums (Schweizer Hitparade)	1
UK Albums (Official Charts)	2
UK Rock & Metal Albums (Official Charts)	1
US Billboard 200	90

=== Year-end charts ===
Year-end chart performance for Closure/Continuation
Chart (2022)	Position
German Albums (Offizielle Top 100)	84
