= Rockpalast (album) =

Live album by Porcupine Tree
- Released: July 2006
- Recorded: 19 November 2005
- Venues: Live Music Hall (Cologne, Germany)
- Genres: Progressive rock, progressive metal
- Length: 97:25
- Label: Transmission
- Producer: Steven Wilson

Porcupine Tree chronology
XMII (2005)	Rockpalast (2006)	Fear of a Blank Planet (2007)

Rockpalast is a live album by British progressive rock band Porcupine Tree, named after the eponymous music festival and TV show, it was recorded at on 19 November 2005 at the Live Music Hall in Cologne, Germany. It was also filmed for a Rockpalast TV special, but not all songs made the broadcast. It is only available to download on the band's official website, and cannot be purchased in stores. The performance relies almost entirely on Deadwing and In Absentia material, with only one older song making the set list. The performances of "Futile" and "Radioactive Toy" were later included as bonus material on the Arriving Somewhere... DVD.

== Track listing ==
Disc one
No.	Title	Writer(s)	Original release	Length
1.	"Intro"			2:45
2.	"Open Car"	Steven Wilson	Deadwing (2005)	4:45
3.	"Blackest Eyes"	Wilson	In Absentia (2002)	5:37
4.	"Lazarus"	Wilson	Deadwing	4:17
5.	"Futile"	Gavin Harrison, Wilson	In Absentia bonus track	6:29
6.	"Mellotron Scratch"	Wilson	Deadwing	7:23
7.	"Mother and Child Divided"	Harrison, Wilson	Deadwing bonus track	5:23
8.	".3"	Wilson	In Absentia	6:22
9.	"So Called Friend"	Richard Barbieri, Colin Edwin, Harrison, Wilson	"Lazarus" b-side (2005)	5:13

Disc two
No.	Title	Writer(s)	Original release	Length
1.	"Arriving Somewhere But Not Here"	Wilson	Deadwing	12:46
2.	"The Sound of Muzak"	Wilson	In Absentia	5:11
3.	"Start of Something Beautiful"	Harrison, Wilson	Deadwing	7:27
4.	"Halo"	Barbieri, Edwin, Harrison, Wilson	Deadwing	8:36
5.	"Radioactive Toy"	Wilson	On the Sunday of Life (1992)	7:48
6.	"Trains"	Wilson	In Absentia	7:18

== Personnel ==
- Steven Wilson – vocals, guitar, remixing
- Colin Edwin – bass guitar
- Richard Barbieri – synthesizers
- Gavin Harrison – drums
- John Wesley – guitar, backing vocals (touring member)

=== Production ===
- Reiner Kühl – live sound engineer
- Erik Nacken – producer
- Peter Sommer – executive producer
- Lasse Hoile – cover artist
- Carl Glover – designer
