= Herd Culling =

2022 single by Porcupine Tree

Single by Porcupine Tree

from the album Closure/Continuation
- Released: 20 May 2022
- Recorded: 2011–September 2021
- Studio: Home Studios of each band member
- Length: 7:03; 3:32 (single edit)
- Label: Music for Nations
- Songwriters: Gavin Harrison; Richard Barbieri; Steven Wilson
- Producers: Wilson; Barbieri; Harrison

Porcupine Tree singles chronology
"Of the New Day" (2022)	"Herd Culling" (2022)	"Rats Return" (2022)

Herd Culling is a song by progressive rock band Porcupine Tree, first released on 20 May 2022 as the third single in promotion of the band's eleventh studio album Closure/Continuation. The track was released alongside a visualizer and later, on 1 September 2022 a music video.

== Background and composition ==
According to lead vocalist Steven Wilson, "Herd Culling" was the final track written for the album. He stated that after the rest of the songs were assembled, he felt that there was "still musically a "hole" for something dramatic" in the middle of the record. Wilson elaborated on the track stating that

"Beginning with Gavin coming up with an unusual rhythm in 11 (he'll never give you something easy!), it was then a case of myself and Richard finding the music, and both of us working with sequenced electronics and sound design, alongside the quiet/loud guitar dynamics. The full 7 minute version is a musical storytelling which features several other sections, but I think the edit works quite well as a more conventionally structured piece too – a smaller bite of music."

Lyrically speaking, Wilson stated that the track is "about a very specific event in history, but it also deals with the broader theme of paranoia in the modern age - someone or something is coming up your driveway or in your front garden, and their/its motives are unclear." Wilson also stated that the title "obviously takes on extra resonance in our Covid times".

== Reception ==
Greg Kennelty of Metal Injection stated that the track sounded like something off of Porcupine Tree's records Stupid Dream and In Absentia. They also stated that the track has "semi-distorted vocals and loose grooves" throughout. Jerry Ewing of Louder Sound described the track as being very "powerful". Stevie Chick of The Guardian stated how many of the tracks impresses, heavily varying in genres and styles. They specifically call "Herd Culling" as being a "thrilling monolithic bombast". Jordan Blum of Metal Injection stated that the track, along with "Harridan", "Rats Return", and "Walk the Plank" packed "quirky hostilities".

Kevin Harley of Record Collector liked the track, they stated that the track evokes Wilson's fascination with film with its "horror-movie lyrics". They elaborated stating "Between lights in the sky, scratching at the doors and curses on the land, the sense of apocalyptic interior dread oozes a kind of miasmic gloom not many miles removed from Radiohead's "Climbing Up The Walls." Brize Ezell of PopMatters called the track "nervy", stating that it could easily fit right onto something on a recent Pineapple Thief record.

== Personnel ==
Personnel per album liner notes

Porcupine Tree

- Steven Wilson – vocals, guitars, bass, piano, mixing, design concept, production
- Richard Barbieri – keyboards, synthesisers, production
- Gavin Harrison – drums, percussion, drum mixing, production

Production

- Ian Anderson of The Designers Republic – art direction, image editor, photography, graphic design, creative director
- Paul Stacey – additional guitar recording
- Ed Scull – additional guitar recording engineering
- Penny Morgan, Peter Rudge, Pro Music Management – management
