= John Wesley (guitarist) =

American guitarist and singer

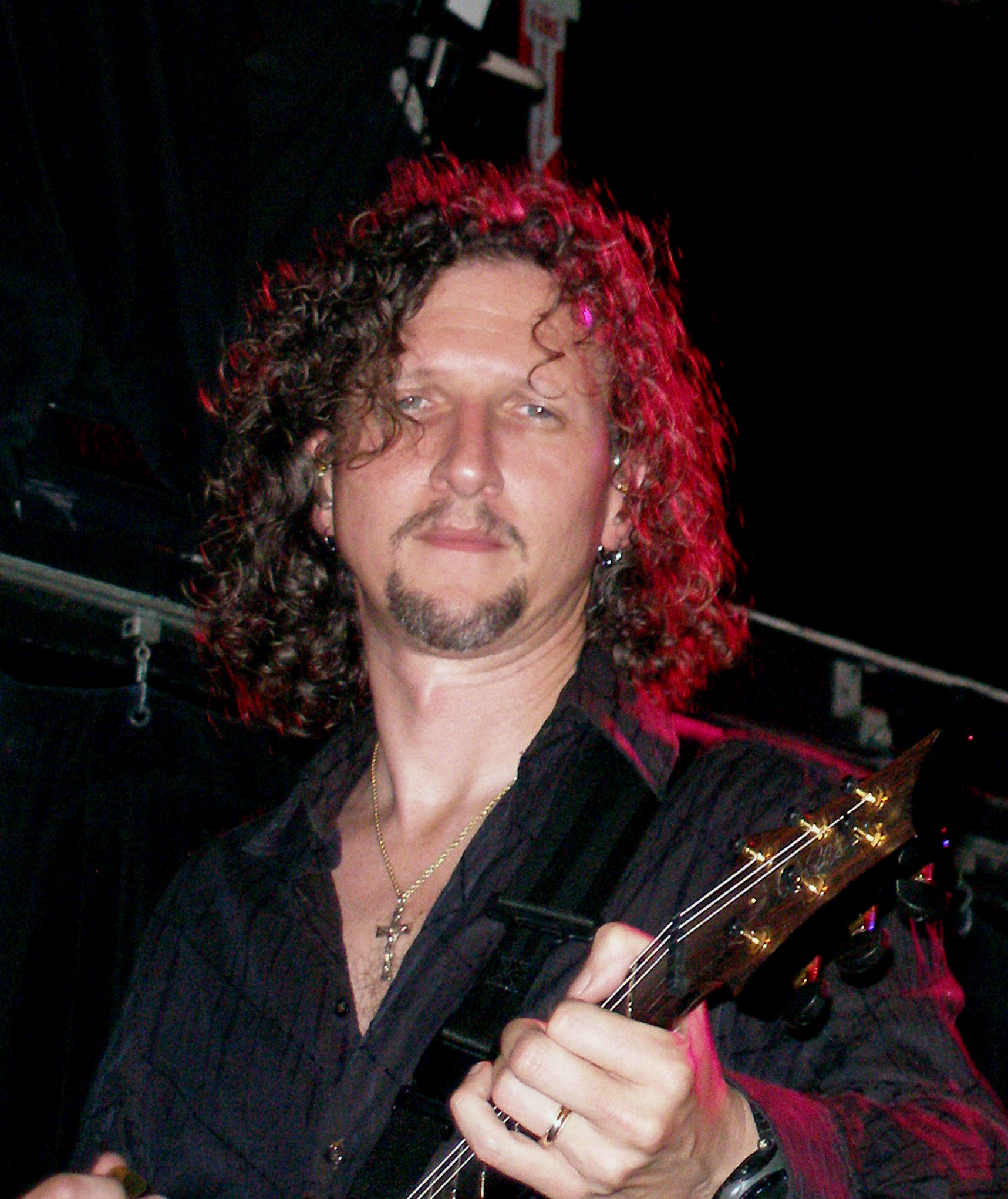
- Wesley performing with Porcupine Tree in 2008

Background information
- Born: St. Petersburg, Florida, U.S.
- Origin: Tampa Bay area, U.S.
- Genres: Progressive rock; alternative rock; hard rock
- Occupations: Musician; singer; songwriter
- Instruments: Guitar; vocals
- Years active: 1979–present
- Member of: Vertical Horizon, Voyage 35
- Formerly of: Porcupine Tree; Mike Tramp; Sound of Contact; Edison's Children
- Website: john-wesley.com

John Wesley Dearth III known professionally as "John Wesley" or "Wes", is an American guitarist, singer, and songwriter. He is best known as touring guitarist for the English progressive rock band, Porcupine Tree from 2002 and 2010, during which he performed more than 450 shows worldwide. Wesley is also known for performing and collaborating with artists such as Mike Tramp, Fish, Sound of Contact, Steven Wilson, Big Elf, and Edison's Children, while maintaining a solo career that spans eight studio albums blending alternative, progressive, and hard rock elements. In recent years, he has toured as guitarist and backing vocalist for Vertical Horizon and co-founded the band Voyage 35 with former Porcupine Tree bassist Colin Edwin to perform early Porcupine Tree material live.

== Biography ==
His professional career began in the early 1980s in the Tampa Bay area where he founded 1991 Southwestern Music Conference's showcase act Autodrive along with drummer/producer Mark Prator. The following year, Wesley embarked on a solo career and became the opening act for British rockers Marillion on seven consecutive tour legs around the world, especially North and South America, the UK and Europe.

His debut album Under the Red and White Sky was released in 1994 and Mark Kelly played keyboards and produced the album, with guest appearances from both Ian Mosley and Steve Rothery. Also Marillion singer Steve Hogarth recorded backing vocals on two tracks on Wesleys second album The Emperor Falls.

In 1998, Wesley and ex–White Lion frontman Mike Tramp were the opening act for the Peter Frampton/Lynyrd Skynyrd tour. Following this was several world tours with Marillion's former singer Fish. In 2001, John Wesley was the primary co-writer of Fish's Fellini Days album. He has performed as sideman, guitarist/vocalist for Porcupine Tree, during the In Absentia, Deadwing, Fear of a Blank Planet and The Incident world tours.

In 2005, Wesley produced and recorded his fifth studio release, Shiver. The album was co-produced by drummer and co-owner of his Tampa, Florida. recording studio, RedRoom Recorders, Mark Prator, and mixed by Steven Wilson of Porcupine Tree.

On August 24, 2007, Wesley announced that he was making his back catalog of solo material available for free download on his website. In 2011, Wesley partnered with UK native Dean Tidey (live guitarist with Feeder), to produce his EP, The Lilypad Suite.

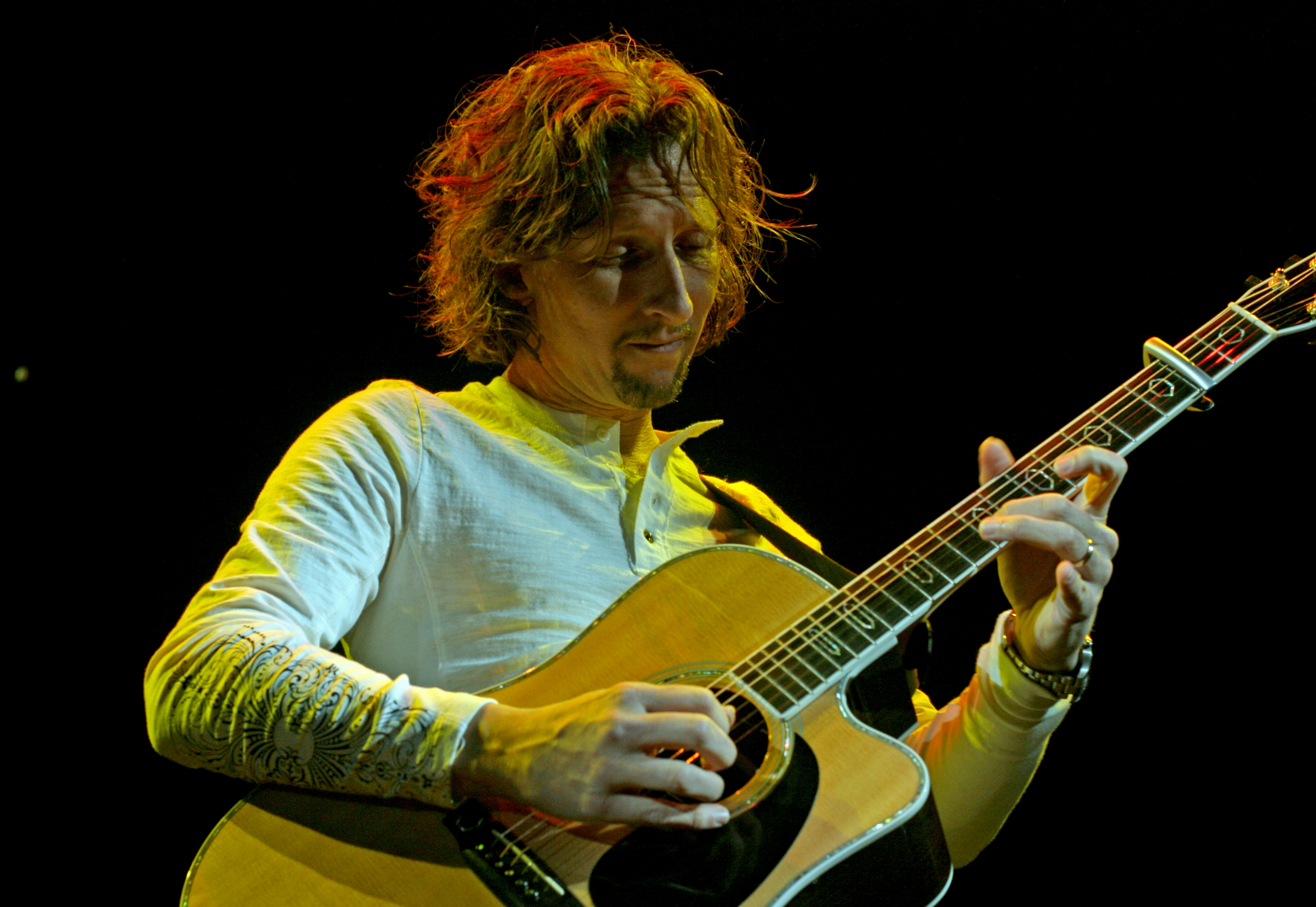
Wesley performing in 2009

In March 2013, Wesley performed with Sound of Contact as their live guitarist for the Marillion Weekend concert in Montreal, Quebec. He then joined the band for their European tour in May 2013 and was a part of two Sound of Contact music videos produced in relation to the band's debut album, Dimensionaut.

On Wesley's sixth full-length studio album Disconnect, released in 2014, Alex Lifeson made a guest appearance, playing a guitar solo on the track Once a Warrior.

Other musicians Wesley has worked beside include Sean Malone; as well as a live performer with Edison's Children featuring Marillion's Pete Trewavas and starring Neil Armstrong's son guitarist Rick Armstrong. He has also performed as an occasional fill-in bassist and lead guitarist for Florida-based group Sister Hazel.

In 2018, Wesley performed lead vocals with international artists ÚMÆ on their debut album titled Lost in the View, which was released on January 3, 2019. Guest performers on this project also include Adam Holzman (Steven Wilson, Miles Davis) and Conner Green (Haken).

In July 2019, Wesley and drummer Mark Prator played with Edison's Children, the sci-fi band of Neil Armstrong's son (Rick Armstrong) which is known for writing music about the supernatural & extra-terrestrial co-headlining with the Alan Parsons Project in an outdoor concert festival near the Kennedy Space Center celebrating the 50th anniversary of Rick's Father and Apollo 11's landing a crewed spacecraft on the Moon for the first time.

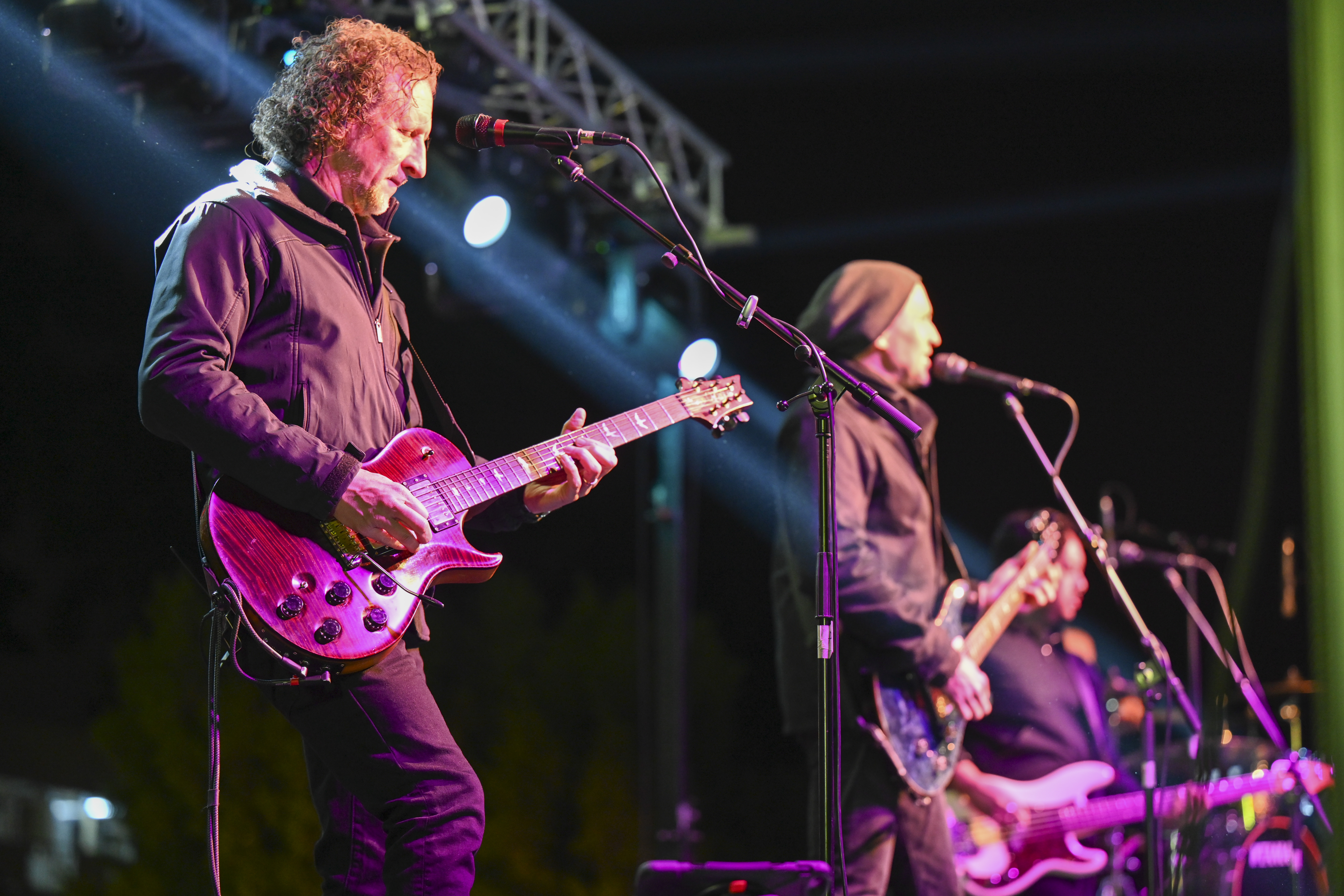
Wesley performing with Vertical Horizon in 2024

In 2021, Wesley began touring as guitarist and backing vocals for Vertical Horizon.

== Discography ==
=== Studio albums ===
- 1994 – Under the Red and White Sky
- 1995 – The Closing of the Pale Blue Eyes [EP]
- 1998 – The Emperor Falls
- 2002 – Chasing Monsters
- 2005 – Shiver
- 2011 – The Lilypad Suite [EP]
- 2014 – Disconnect
- 2016 – A Way You'll Never Be

=== Studio albums with other artists ===
- With Mike Tramp: Songs I Left Behind: (Guitar on "What If I", "Falling Down"), This & That (But A Whole Lot More): (Guitar on "Wait Not For Me")
- With Fish: Fellini Days: (co-writing and recording credits)
- With Porcupine Tree (recording credits): In Absentia, Fear of a Blank Planet, The Incident
- With Ruud Jolie: For All We Know (lead guitar on "I Lost Myself Today")
- With ÚMÆ:Lost in the View: (lead vocals on "Turn Back Time", "Echo", "Running Away")

=== Compilation ===
- 2004 – John Wesley: TEN

=== Singles ===
- 1994 – The Last Light
- 1995 – Into the Night
- 1995 – Domino
- 2003 – Fly Boy

=== Live releases ===
- 1998 – Waiting for the Sun to Shine in Paris
- 1998 – Wesfest 98
- 1999 – Starting the Engine II
- 1999 – WesFest 1999
- 2000 – The John Wesley Bachelor Party Tour
- 2002 – The Chicago and Frisco Bootlegs
- 2006 – Live at Katie Fitzgerald's
- 2009 – Oxford
- 2010 – Live at the L'Olympia
- 2013 – Live at Morrisound 30th Anniversary Show

=== Live albums with other artists ===
- With Fish: Issue 30 CD (From the 1999 Haddington Convention)(2000), Candlelight in Fog (limited edition live album, 3000 copies only)(2000), Sashimi(2001), Fellini Nights (2002)
- With Porcupine Tree: XM, XMII, Rockpalast, Arriving Somewhere..., We Lost The Skyline, Ilosaarirock, Atlanta, Octane Twisted

=== Videos ===
- With Porcupine Tree: Arriving Somewhere... September 2006, Anesthetize June 2010, Octane Twisted November 2012
- With Sound of Contact: "Not Coming Down" May 2013, "Cosmic Distance Ladder" May 2013
