= Shallow (Porcupine Tree song) =

Single by Porcupine Tree

from the album Deadwing
- Released: 22 February 2005
- Recorded: March–October 2004
- Studio: No Man's Land; The Artillery; Bourne Place; New Rising; RAK; Astoria; Livingstone
- Genre: Alternative metal
- Length: 3:26
- Label: Lava / Atlantic Records
- Songwriter: Steven Wilson
- Producer: Steven Wilson

Porcupine Tree singles chronology
| "Shesmovedon" (2000) | "Shallow" (2005) | "Lazarus" (2005) |

"Shallow" is a song by British progressive rock band Porcupine Tree. It was released on 22 February 2005 as the lead single from the band's eighth studio album Deadwing.

While it became the band's best-charting song in the United States, bandleader Steven Wilson has since rejected "Shallow" as an integrity-lacking attempt to write a rock radio hit.

== Background ==
This single was released in February 2005 exclusively in the United States for radio broadcast purposes. The song managed to enter the Billboard's Hot Mainstream Rock Tracks chart, peaking at #26, without the help of any music video. Wilson disliked promoting the single in the United States, recalling: "You'd have to do those early-morning breakfast radio shows, where you'd have some zany DJ and his posse of sycophants. It's 6am and I'm fucking barely awake, and I'm being wheeled into these shows basically so they could take the piss out of progressive rock."

A European version of the single was first intended but rejected at the last minute, even though it had already started being manufactured. The band and their management asked to destroy all copies but a few made their way to the surface and were sold at some German and Polish stores. The management quickly bought all the remaining copies and sold them (signed only) at the shows for 40 Euro.

"Shallow" was featured in the movie and on the soundtrack for the film Four Brothers in which credits Colin Edwin appears as Colin Balch; he is also credited under this name in the manuscript book for Deadwing.

== Reception ==
In a 2026 interview, Steven Wilson said that "Shallow" was the only time that he felt like he had to write a rock radio crossover single. He said, "I think people were suspicious of our motivations in doing it. And they were right to be. That’s another thing I learned about myself. There are artists who are very good about contriving to create radio songs, and they somehow pull it off. When I do it, it just sounds fake a mile off. It stinks. And I don’t know why."

Drummer Gavin Harrison said that he liked the song but recalled everyone else involved hating it. After a few shows on the Deadwing tour, it was removed from the setlist. It has not been played live since 2005.

== Track listing ==
US promotional CD
| No. | Title | Length |
|---|---|---|
| 1. | "Shallow" (Radio Edit) | 3:36 |

EU CD single (cancelled)
| No. | Title | Length |
|---|---|---|
| 1. | "Shallow" (Radio Edit) | 3:36 |
| 2. | "So Called Friend" | 4:48 |
| 3. | "Half-Light" | 6:20 |

== Personnel ==
- Steven Wilson – vocals, guitars, piano, keyboards, hammered dulcimer
- Richard Barbieri – keyboards, synthesizers
- Colin Edwin – bass guitar
- Gavin Harrison – drums, percussion

== Chart position ==
| Chart (2005) | Peak position |
|---|---|
| US Mainstream Rock (Billboard) | 26 |
