= Harridan =

Harridan may refer to:

- Harridan, stereotype of an unpleasant, belligerent, imperious woman; essentially synonymous with shrew (stock character)
- Miss Harridan, the main antagonist of the 2003 comedy film Daddy Day Care
- Herrena the Henna-Haired Harridan, a minor character in the Discworld universe of novels
- "Harridan" (song), a 2021 song by Porcupine Tree
