= Under the Red and White Sky =

Studio album by John Wesley
- Released: 1994
- Recorded: c. 1993 at Morrisound Recording, Tampa, Florida
- Genre: Rock
- Length: 52:57
- Label: Racket Records
- Producers: Mark Kelly; Jim Morris

Under the Red and White Sky is the first solo album by singer, songwriter and guitarist John Wesley. It was released in 1994 on Racket Records, a label operated by the British progressive rock band Marillion and used mainly for their own and related releases. Wesley had previously worked as a guitar technician on one of the band's North American tour in the early 1990s and was eventually promoted to their opening act. Marillion's keyboardist Mark Kelly appears on all tracks and also produced the album with sound engineer Jim Morris. Additionally, Marillion guitarist Steve Rothery and drummer Ian Mosley contributed. Other musicians include Mark and Paul Prator, who Wesley (as Wes Dearth) had previously played with in the band Autodrive. Additionally, the album features Sean Malone of Gordian Knot (credited as "Shawn Malone") on fretless bass guitar.

In 1995, the album was released in France by the Dutch label CNR Music. This version included a bonus CD with acoustic material titled The Closing of the Pale Blue Eyes. Both recordings are available as free digital downloads from Wesley's official website.

== Track listing ==
1. "Into the night" – 04:46
2. "None so beautiful" – 04:26
3. "Thirteen days" – 04:50
4. "Waiting for the sun" – 05:01
5. "She said no" – 03:41
6. "The last light" – 04:48
7. "To reach out" – 05:27
8. "Rome is burning" – 03:04
9. "Our hero" – 04:39
10. "What you really want" – 04:11
11. "Cuttin the tree" – 04:09
12. "Silver" – 03:42

Total time 52:57
All songs written by John Wesley, except "Into the Night" and "Waiting for the sun", written by John Wesley and Paul Prator.

=== The Closing of the Pale Blue Eyes (bonus disc of 1995 CNR Music release) ===
1. "Right Here Inside Me" – 03:57
2. "To Share A Dream" – 01:35
3. "Alone - Together" – 02:46
4. "In Ohio" – 02:33
5. "Say Goodbye To The Pale Blue Eyes" – 03:09
6. "A Long Way Down" – 03:50
7. "Death Of A Friend" – 02:27
8. "Right Here Beside Me" – 02:41

== Personnel ==
- John Wesley - guitars and vocals
- Mark Kelly - keyboards and piano
- Mark Prator - drums and percussion
- Dave Wehner - bass guitar
- Ian Mosley - drums on "None so beautiful", "Thirteen days",
- Steve Rothery - guitar solo on "Thirteen days",
- Sean Malone - fretless bass guitar,
- Paul Prator - keyboards on "Into the Night", "What you really want", "To reach out".
- Russell Farrow - crash chords on "The Last Light"
- Leroy Myers - backing Vocals on "The Last Light", "Waiting for the sun".
- Brian Benscoter - percussion on "None so beautiful"
