= Rats Return =

2022 song by Porcupine Tree

Single by Porcupine Tree

from the album Closure/Continuation
- Released: 17 June 2022
- Recorded: 2011–September 2021
- Studio: Home Studios of each band member
- Length: 5:40
- Label: Music for Nations
- Songwriters: Gavin Harrison; Steven Wilson
- Producers: Wilson; Richard Barbieri; Gavin Harrison

Porcupine Tree singles chronology
| "Herd Culling" (2022) | "Rats Return" (2022) |

"Rats Return" is a song by British progressive rock band Porcupine Tree. It was first released on 17 June 2022 as the fourth and final single in promotion of the band's ninth studio album Closure/Continuation. It was released alongside a music video.

== Background and composition ==
The track has been stated as having a political theme, being called "a take-down of politicians". According to front-man Steven Wilson in an interview with NME, "The rats are politicians who express having an interest in the public but, when it comes down to it, only want to save themselves. Having lived through Brexit, Trump and Boris Johnson, it wasn't hard to get depressed about what's going on in the world,"

Furthermore, after being asked if he was optimistic for the future, he stated that he is more afraid than optimistic, stating that reading about what the government is doing he is disappointed by the "backwards, reactionary way of thinking". The track has also been described by Wilson as being about "those who claim to have the interests of the people at heart, but when it comes down to it there is only ego and self-interest". Wilson would continue elaborating on that statement stating how "I find myself reflecting on what sort of person would actually be so driven as to want to rule over a whole nation, and aren’t these people by definition the very last people that should be allowed to do so? The rats will always save themselves first."

Musically, the track has been stated as being "right up the alley" of Tool, Opeth, or Between the Buried and Me. The "prog" riffs have been stated as slinking and skittering over staccato beats in way familiar to Storm Corrosion, a duo band of Wilson and Opeth frontman Mikael Åkerfeldt. The track has also been described as being "mysterious, near-ethereal" in tone.

== Music video ==
The music video, directed by Ricky Allen, was released alongside the single and has been described as featuring black and white Soviet-era style graphic design and photography. The video shows an off-kilter and dystopian game show called "The Late Late Late Show with Special Guests (Live)". The game show features a cosmonaut, an injured ballerina, and a general officer, among others with "nightmarish rules" in which the general forces the injured ballerina to dance while "a mad drummer stares down the camera", and "a number of distressing visions of the guests in near-psychedelic disarray". It has also been stated as playing "perfectly with the themes of the song" with its political message.

== Reception ==
Thom Jurek of AllMusic enjoyed the track, describing it as balancing "explosive, metallic interaction" with "spooky, atmospheric backdrops, jagged time shifts, and a spacey melody". Stevie Chick of The Guardian called the track as featuring "math-metal riffage". Along with "Walk the Plank" and "Herd Culling", Jordan Blum of Metal Injection described the track as packing "the same sort of quirky hostilities". Brad Sanders of Pitchfork called the track alongside "Herd Culling" as "cousins of 'Harridan'", being built on "nervy bass lines that joust with impressionistic synths".

== Personnel ==
Personnel per album liner notes

Porcupine Tree

- Steven Wilson – vocals, guitars, bass, piano, mixing, design concept, production
- Richard Barbieri – keyboards, synthesisers, production
- Gavin Harrison – drums, percussion, drum mixing, production

Production

- Ian Anderson of The Designers Republic – art direction, image editor, photography, graphic design, creative director
- Paul Stacey – additional guitar recording
- Ed Scull – additional guitar recording engineering
- Penny Morgan, Peter Rudge, Pro Music Management – management
