= Of the New Day =

2022 single by Porcupine Tree

Single by Porcupine Tree

from the album Closure/Continuation
- Released: 8 March 2022
- Recorded: 2011–September 2021
- Length: 4:43
- Label: Music for Nations
- Songwriter: Steven Wilson
- Producers: Wilson; Richard Barbieri; Gavin Harrison

Porcupine Tree singles chronology
"Harridan" (2021)	"Of the New Day" (2022)	"Herd Culling" (2022)

"Of the New Day" is a song by British progressive rock band Porcupine Tree, released on 8 March 2022 as the second single in promotion of the band's eleventh studio album Closure/Continuation. The track was released alongside a music video.

== Background and composition ==
According to front-man Steven Wilson, "Of the New Day is a song of rebirth, emerging from the darkness", further elaborating by stating how "It sounds deceptively simple, a recognisably atypical Porcupine Tree ballad. That is until you realise that the length of the bars is constantly changing, flipping between bars of regular 4/4 time to 3/4, to 5/4 to 6/4, 11/4, so that the track never settles into any steady time."

Wilson also noted how the track is something the band could do very well, stating how the band could come up with "a basic idea that’s almost intellectual or mathematical".

== Reception ==
In a review of Closure/Continuation, David Rodriguez of Everything is Noise enjoyed the track, calling it a calm, ballad-esque track. They had also noted the gimmick of constantly changing time signatures, saying it's fitting given the topic of change, evolution, and rebirth. Another review of the record by Thom Jurek of AllMusic enjoyed the track, stating that the track asserted itself as a "spacious ballad" that spirals into "angular prog", "blurring time signatures", and harmonics before "returning to the lithe, keyboard-centric melody".

Emma Johnston of Classic Rock described the track as a "psychedelic swirl" that gives way to the next track, "Rat's Return". Another positive review of the track by Steview Chuck of The Guardian noted that "despite the budding sophistication of his solo work, the Wilson of Porcupine Tree remains a better musician than lyricist, but there’s a sense of chiaroscuro at play within the sensitive chord changes of Of the New Day that assures us he is no mere technical genius, and that a heart beats beneath Closure/Continuation’s flash and flair."

Brad Sanders of Pitchfork described the track as a strangely paranoid sounding ballad in a similar-vein to earlier tracks such as "Lazarus" and "My Ashes". Brice Ezell of PopMatters praised the track. They called the track a gorgeous tune that justifies the band's reunion on its own, also interpreting the track's lyrics as about the "now tenuous time for Porcupine Tree".

== Personnel ==
Personnel per album liner notes Porcupine Tree

- Steven Wilson – vocals, guitars, bass, piano, mixing, design concept, production
- Richard Barbieri – keyboards, synthesisers, production
- Gavin Harrison – drums, percussion, drum mixing, production

Production

- Ian Anderson of The Designers Republic – art direction, image editor, photography, graphic design, creative director
- Paul Stacey – additional guitar recording
- Ed Scull – additional guitar recording engineering
- Penny Morgan, Peter Rudge, Pro Music Management – management
