= Recordings (album) =

Compilation album by Porcupine Tree
- Released: 12 June 2001; 6 September 2010 (Reissue)
- Recorded: 1998–2000
- Studio: Foel Studio/No Man's Land
- Genres: Progressive rock, alternative rock
- Length: 61:44
- Label: Snapper

Porcupine Tree chronology
Voyage 34: The Complete Trip (2000)	Recordings (2001)	Transmission IV (2001)

Recordings is a compilation album by British progressive rock band Porcupine Tree, first released in May 2001. It is mainly a collection of b-sides and unreleased songs from the Stupid Dream and Lightbulb Sun albums' recording sessions. Recordings was originally a limited release, limited to only 20,000 copies worldwide. It was later reissued on CD in September, 2010, and as double vinyl (2000 copies only) in January 2011.

== Concept ==
Frontman Steven Wilson described the album:

"Six of the songs are taken from singles that were released in 1999 and 2000. Sometimes tracks don't make it on to an album first time around not for reasons of quality (or lack of), but perhaps because they just didn't fit onto the album, or one member of the band wasn't happy with the track. Also perceptions can change and I think we all felt in hindsight that these six tracks deserved to be heard by a wider audience...The remaining 3 tracks we recorded specifically for the album. "Oceans Have No Memory" is a new band recording of a demo that was originally issued on the B-side of the "Piano Lessons" 7 -inch single. "Access Denied" was written and demoed for Lightbulb Sun but no one liked it except me! So I took the opportunity to re-present it to the band for inclusion on Recordings and this time they let me do it. Finally "Buying New Soul" was a song recorded during writing sessions just after Lightbulb Sun was finished. I think if it had been written a couple of months earlier it would have been included on the album. We thought about holding it back for the next album, but in the end we felt that because the next album is probably going to be moving into different musical waters it should be released now."

== Recording and release ==
The album opener, "Buying New Soul", was unreleased prior to the release of the album. It was recorded on 15 March 2000, prior to the actual release of Lightbulb Sun, but after it had actually been completed in January 2000. "Access Denied" was also previously unreleased; it was demoed during Lightbulb Sun writing sessions, but the final album version was not recorded until November 2000. The track "Cure for Optimism" and the instrumental "Untitled" were originally released on the "Shesmovedon" CD single. The former was originally recorded in July 1999, in between the two album sessions, where the latter was an improvised live take version in the studio in March 2000. "Disappear" recorded during the Lightbulb Sun sessions and was originally released on the "Four Chords That Made a Million" CD single. "Ambulance Chasing" was recorded during the Stupid Dream sessions in 1998 and originally released on the "Piano Lessons" CD single in 1999. "In Formaldehyde" was recorded during the Lightbulb Sun sessions and was originally released on the "Four Chords That Made a Million" CD single, although this version does not have a fade out ending. "Even Less (Full Version)" is a version recorded during the Stupid Dream sessions prior to being edited down to the seven-minute Stupid Dream cut. Part one was the Stupid Dream album version; part two was released on the "Stranger by the Minute" CD single. The album closer, "Oceans Have No Memory", is a previously unreleased full band version. The Steven Wilson solo demo version had been recorded during the Stupid Dream sessions and released on the "Piano Lessons" 7" single, where as the full band version was recorded in November 2000.

=== Unused tracks ===
Two additional songs from these eras, titled: "I Fail" and "Novak", were excluded from this release. The former was an unreleased song from the Stupid Dream sessions which was present on a rare 1997 promo demo (which is composed of demos from Stupid Dream). The latter was an instrumental b-side from Lightbulb Sun sessions, which was released on the vinyl edition of the "Shesmovedon" single.

== Critical reception ==
Professional ratings
Review scores
Source	Rating
Allmusic	3/5 stars
DPRP	(8.5/10)

Reception for the album was quite positive, with many reviewers concluding that, while the album didn't quite flow together as well as most Porcupine Tree albums, the songs themselves were still quite good. Aspects of the album that were praised included the experimental nature of the songs and the inclusion of the complete, full length version of "Even Less".

== Track listing ==
All tracks are written by Steven Wilson except "Buying New Soul", "Untitled", and "Ambulance Chasing", which are credited to all four band members.

No.	Title	Recording dates; release info	Length
1.	"Buying New Soul"	Mar 2000; previously unreleased	10:24
2.	"Access Denied"	Oct - Nov 2000; previously unreleased	3:35
3.	"Cure for Optimism"	Jul 1999; "Shesmovedon" CD single	6:11
4.	"Untitled"	Mar 2000; "Shesmovedon" CD single	8:53
5.	"Disappear"	Nov 1999 - Feb 2000; "4 Chords That Made a Million" CD single	3:37
6.	"Ambulance Chasing"	Jan - Nov 1998; "Piano Lessons" CD single	6:32
7.	"In Formaldehyde"	Nov 1999 - Feb 2000; "4 Chords That Made a Million" CD single	5:19
8.	"Even Less" (full length version)	Jan - Nov 1998; 1st part on Stupid Dream LP, 2nd part on "Stranger by the Minute" CD single	14:08
9.	"Oceans Have No Memory"	Oct - Nov 2000; previously unreleased band version (SW demo version on "Piano Lessons" single)	3:06
Total length:			61:44

== Personnel ==
Porcupine Tree

- Steven Wilson – vocals, guitars, piano, samples, hammered dulcimer on "Access Denied" and "In Formaldehyde", mellotron on "Disappear" and "In Formaldehyde", hammond organ on "Oceans Have No Memory"
- Richard Barbieri – keyboards, analogue synthesizers, hammond organ on "Disappear", "Ambulance Chasing" and "Even Less", mellotron on "Even Less"
- Colin Edwin – bass guitar, double bass
- Chris Maitland – drums, percussion

Additional musicians

- Theo Travis – flute on "Ambulance Chasing" and "Even Less", saxophone on "Ambulance Chasing"
