= Anesthetize (album) =

Live album by Porcupine Tree
- Released: May 2010
- Recorded: October 2008
- Venue: 013 (Tilburg, Netherlands)
- Genres: Progressive rock, progressive metal
- Length: 2:16:08 (CD)
- Labels: Kscope, Roadrunner Records
- Director: Lasse Hoile
- Producer: Porcupine Tree

Porcupine Tree chronology
Arriving Somewhere... (2006)	Anesthetize (2010)

Anesthetize is the second live concert film by progressive rock band Porcupine Tree, released on 20 May 2010. The Blu-ray edition was released on 15 June. It is filmed in high definition and taken from two concerts given by Porcupine Tree at Tilburg, Netherlands on 15 and 16 October, at the end of the Fear of a Blank Planet tour in 2008. The film is directed and edited by Lasse Hoile and the audio track is mixed in stereo and 5.1 Surround by Steven Wilson.

Deluxe special edition of Anesthetize includes a 130-minute concert film on both standard definition DVD and high definition Blu-ray Disc. Additionally, the package includes two audio CDs of the entire live film soundtrack, alongside a bonus track not featured in the film. Limited to 4,000 copies with a grey cover and 1,000 copies with a red cover, the special edition comes in a cloth bound hardback book featuring concert photography of the band taken over the last few years. The retail editions of Anesthetize include Blu-ray and DVD versions.

As of November 2017, Anesthetize DVD was the #2 "TOP DVD/Videos of All-Time" in Prog Archives website. The DVD was also decorated "DVD Release of the Year" by Classic Rock magazine.

== Track listing ==
=== DVD/Blu-ray Disc ===
1. Intro
2. "Fear of a Blank Planet" (from Fear of a Blank Planet)
3. "My Ashes" (from Fear of a Blank Planet)
4. "Anesthetize" (from Fear of a Blank Planet)
5. "Sentimental" (from Fear of a Blank Planet)
6. "Way Out of Here" (from Fear of a Blank Planet)
7. "Sleep Together" (from Fear of a Blank Planet)
8. "What Happens Now?" (from Nil Recurring)
9. "Normal" (from Nil Recurring)
10. "Dark Matter" (from Signify)
11. "Drown With Me" (b-side from In Absentia)
12. "Cheating the Polygraph" (from Nil Recurring)
13. "Half-Light" (b-side from Deadwing)
14. "Sever" (from Signify)
15. "Wedding Nails" (from In Absentia)
16. "Strip the Soul" / ".3" (from In Absentia)
17. "Sleep of No Dreaming" (from Signify)
18. "Halo" (from Deadwing)
19. Outro

==== Extras (Blu-ray Disc only) ====
- "Way Out of Here" (live film directed by Lasse Hoile)
- "My Ashes" (live film directed by Lasse Hoile)
- "Wedding Nails" (live film directed by Lasse Hoile)
- "Strip the Soul" / ".3" (live film directed by Lasse Hoile)
- "Nil Recurring" (live film directed by Lasse Hoile)

== CD Track listing ==
=== Disc 1 ===
No.	Title	Length
1.	"Intro"	2:07
2.	"Fear of a Blank Planet"	7:34
3.	"My Ashes"	4:46
4.	"Anesthetize"	17:20
5.	"Sentimental"	5:18
6.	"Way Out of Here"	7:47
7.	"Sleep Together"	7:54
8.	"Prodigal (Bonus Track)"	6:03
Total length:		58:49

=== Disc 2 ===
No.	Title	Length
1.	"What Happens Now?"	8:09
2.	"Normal"	7:13
3.	"Dark Matter"	8:57
4.	"Drown With Me"	5:21
5.	"Cheating the Polygraph"	8:11
6.	"Half-Light"	5:28
7.	"Sever"	5:37
8.	"Wedding Nails"	5:43
9.	"Strip the Soul / .3"	8:17
10.	"The Sleep of No Dreaming"	5:31
11.	"Halo"	8:34
Total length:		77:01

== Performers ==
- Steven Wilson – guitars, keyboards, lead vocals
- Richard Barbieri – keyboards
- Colin Edwin – bass
- Gavin Harrison – drums
- John Wesley – guitars, vocals (touring member)

== Certifications ==
- Canada: Gold
