= Stranger by the Minute =

Single by Porcupine Tree

from the album Stupid Dream
- Released: October 1999
- Recorded: 1998
- Genre: Progressive rock, alternative rock
- Length: 4:30 (album version); 3:47 (edit); 11:13 (CD single); 7:49 (7" vinyl)
- Label: KScope / Snapper
- Songwriter: Steven Wilson

Porcupine Tree singles chronology
| "Piano Lessons" (1999) | "Stranger by the Minute" (1999) | "Pure Narcotic" (1999) |

Alternative Cover
- Cover of the 7" vinyl

"Stranger by the Minute" is a single by British progressive rock band Porcupine Tree, released in October 1999, from the Stupid Dream album. It came in two formats: a regular CD and a 7" vinyl (limited to 1.000 copies) which features "Hallogallo", a Neu! cover. It was originally intended to include the complete version of "Even Less" on the single, but this would have meant exceeding the maximum running time allowed for a single in the UK. The CD, besides the video for "Piano Lessons", contains a Macromedia presentation including band photos, lyrics, the band's discography, and more.

== Track listing (CD) ==
1. "Stranger by the Minute (Edit)" – 3:47
2. "Even Less (Part 2)" – 7:26
3. "VIDEO: Piano Lessons" – 3:30

== Track listing (7" vinyl) ==
1. A/ "Stranger by the Minute (Edit)" 3:45
2. B/ "Hallogallo" 4:04
- All titles by Steven Wilson, except "Hallogallo" by Rother/Dinger (Neu!).
- "Hallogallo" was originally recorded in 1995 and issued on the Insignificance cassette. This version has been remixed and slightly extended.

== Personnel ==
- Steven Wilson – vocals, guitars, piano, samples, bass on "Stranger by the Minute", all instruments on "Hallogallo"
- Richard Barbieri – analogue synthesizers, hammond organ, mellotron
- Colin Edwin – bass on "Even Less (Part 2)"
- Chris Maitland – drums, percussion, backing vocals on "Stranger by the Minute"
- Theo Travis – flute on "Even Less (Part 2)"
