= Harridan (song) =

2021 single by Porcupine Tree

Single by Porcupine Tree

from the album Closure/Continuation
- Released: 1 November 2021
- Recorded: 2011–September 2021
- Studio: Home Studios of each band member
- Genre: Progressive rock
- Length: 8:07
- Label: Music for Nations
- Songwriters: Gavin Harrison; Steven Wilson
- Producers: Wilson; Richard Barbieri; Harrison

Porcupine Tree singles chronology
"Bonnie the Cat" (2010)	"Harridan" (2021)	"Of the New Day" (2022)

"Harridan" is a song by British progressive rock band Porcupine Tree, first released on 1 November 2021 as the lead single for the band's eleventh studio album Closure/Continuation. Upon release, it became the first new music by the band in nearly 12 years, with the last album being released in 2009. Several critics called the track a fitting comeback for the band after their long hiatus.

== Background ==
Harridan, along with a few other tracks on the record have been in the works since shortly following the band's tenth studio album The Incident, released in 2009. According to the band, the track was initially on a computer file called "PT2012", though it went through different name changes. The band have stated that they would sometimes forget about the track's existence altogether, as well as times whenever they would be inclined to finish the tracks and see "where they would take us". About the track and overall record, Steven Wilson stated:

"Listening to the finished pieces, it was clear that this wasn't like any of our work outside of the band – the combined DNA of the people behind the music meant these tracks were forming what was undeniably, unmistakably, obviously a Porcupine Tree record. You'll hear all of that DNA flowing right through 'Harridan.'"

== Videos ==
A lyric video for the track would also be released alongside the track. It was directed by Rob and Miles Skarin. According to them, about working on the video:

"It was an incredible experience to work on a lyric video for Harridan, Porcupine Tree's first new material in over 12 years. We wanted to create an immersive, propulsive video to match the song and we feel as though we accomplished just that. The video is made up of distorted/twisted versions of the Closure / Continuation artwork presented on a TV in a dimly lit room. There’s also a mysterious hillside walk to an ominous white square in the distance. What's behind the square? Watch and find out..."

On 16 July 2022 the band also released a video of the song being performed at Air Studios. On 6 November 2023, a new video for the live version of Harridan would be released.

== Composition ==
The song has been described as being a "journey that kicks off with funky bass" with "irresistible bass grooves", "jutting and pulsing rhythms", and "crashing drums" and "melodic percussion patterns" before transitioning into a more melodic middle section which "allows the outfit to reset and finish out the song in a more crushing heavy style" being described as almost extreme metal, continuing with swinging guitars & tribal-esque beats. The end of the track is led with acoustic guitar and piano, being called melancholic. Overall, instrumentally the track is considered very up tempo, pounding, and in general loud. The track has been noted for being a stylistic departure from Steven Wilson's most recent solo album at the time, The Future Bites, also released in 2021, which saw less of a focus on guitars and a larger focus on synths and keyboards. It has also been compared to B-sides by the band on records such as Deadwing and In Absentia. Lyrically, the track has been described as meaning nothing, simply just being "free association poetry".

== Reception ==
Writing for Music Talkers, Nicholas Gaudet praised the track. Stating that every second of the track is filled with bliss and talent, also stating that the instrumentation is very tight without sounding constricted, also stating that the music is wide enough to give space despite all of the many complex rhythms and patterns. They described bassist, guitarist, and front man Steven Wilson's vocals as being full of harmony and grace, highlighting his vocals in the first chorus. Overall they called the track a three-part story that works masterfully as the first music by the band in over a decade.

== Live version ==
"Harridan"

Single by Porcupine Tree

from the album Closure/Continuation.Live
- Released: 6 November 2023
- Recorded: 7 November 2022
- Venue: Ziggo Dome (Amsterdam)
- Genre: Progressive rock
- Length: 8:07
- Label: Music for Nations
- Songwriter: Wilson

In promotion of Porcupine Tree's live album Closure/Continuation.Live, the band released a live version of the track along with a video on 6 November 2023". The track was recorded during the Closure/Continuation tour, which Steven Wilson stated would likely be the final tour by the band.

The live version of the track was recorded and filmed at the 17,000-capacity Ziggo Dome in Amsterdam, Netherlands on 7 November 2022. The track was released alongside a music video, which features the band's performance of the track during the show. The full live album was released on 8 December 2023.

== Personnel ==
Porcupine Tree

- Steven Wilson – vocals, guitars, bass, piano, mixing, design concept, production
- Richard Barbieri – keyboards, synthesisers, production
- Gavin Harrison – drums, percussion, drum mixing, production

Production

- Ian Anderson of The Designers Republic – art direction, image editor, photography, graphic design, creative director
- Paul Stacey – additional guitar recording
- Ed Scull – additional guitar recording engineering
