= Lazarus (Porcupine Tree song) =

Single by Porcupine Tree

from the album Deadwing
- Released: 14 March 2005
- Studio: No Man's Land; The Artillery; Bourne Place; New Rising; RAK; Astoria; Livingstone
- Genre: Alternative rock
- Length: 4:18 (album version); 3:55 (radio edit)
- Label: DE Lava / Atlantic Records
- Songwriter(s): Steven Wilson
- Producer(s): Steven Wilson

Porcupine Tree singles chronology
"Shallow" (2005)	"Lazarus" (2005)	"Time Flies" (2009)

"Lazarus" is a single by British progressive rock band Porcupine Tree, released in March 2005 only in Poland and Germany. It was accompanied by a music video directed by Danish longtime collaborator Lasse Hoile. The song charted in Germany at number 91.

== Track listing ==
No.	Title	Writer(s)	Length
1.	"Lazarus" (Radio Edit)	Steven Wilson	3:55
2.	"So Called Friend"	Richard Barbieri; Colin Edwin; Gavin Harrison; Wilson
3.	"Half-Light"	Wilson	6:20

== Personnel ==
Porcupine Tree

- Steven Wilson – vocals, guitars, piano, keyboards, bass on "Lazarus"
- Richard Barbieri – keyboards and synthesizers
- Colin Edwin – bass
- Gavin Harrison – drums

Additional personnel

- Mikael Åkerfeldt – backing vocals on "Lazarus"

== Chart position ==
Chart	Position
Germany Singles Top 100	91
