= Time Flies (Porcupine Tree song) =

Promotional single by Porcupine Tree

from the album The Incident
- Released: 11 August 2009
- Genre: Progressive rock
- Length: 11:40 (album version); 5:23 (edit)
- Label: Roadrunner
- Songwriter(s): Steven Wilson
- Producer(s): Steven Wilson

Porcupine Tree singles chronology
"Way Out of Here" (2007)	"Time Flies" (2009)	"Harridan" (2021)

"Time Flies" is a single from British progressive rock band Porcupine Tree. It was the only single to be released from their 2009 studio album The Incident and it also served as their final single for well over 12 years, until "Harridan" was released in November 2021.

== Overview ==
Written by bandleader Steven Wilson, "Time Flies" is the centrepiece of the 55-minute movement that comprises the first disc of the album. The track deals with the passage of time and the phenomenon that as one gets older, time seems to pass even more quickly, with the lyrics making reference to Wilson's life so far.

The single version was edited down from its album length of 11:40, running at 5:23.

== Music video ==
The music video was directed by longtime Porcupine Tree collaborator Lasse Hoile. Due to an error in the mixing stage, the promo CD single edit has a strange drum mix, making it different from the full-length album mix.

== Track listing ==
No.	Title	Length
1.	"Time Flies" (Edit)	5:23

== Personnel ==
- Steven Wilson - vocals, guitars, keyboards
- Richard Barbieri - synthesizers, keyboards
- Colin Edwin - bass guitar
- Gavin Harrison - drums
