= Shesmovedon =

Single by Porcupine Tree

from the album Lightbulb Sun
- Released: 10 July 2000
- Genre: Progressive rock, alternative rock
- Length: 5:13 (album version); 3:50 (edit); 19:01 (regular CD); 18:31 (limited CD); 7:40 (7" vinyl)
- Label: KScope / Snapper
- Songwriter: Steven Wilson

Porcupine Tree singles chronology
"Four Chords That Made a Million" (2000)	"Shesmovedon" (2000)	"Blackest Eyes" (2003)

"Shesmovedon" (pronounced as "She's Moved On") is a song by the British progressive rock band Porcupine Tree. It was released on 10 July 2000 as the second single from the band's sixth studio album Lightbulb Sun.

The song reached No. 85 on the UK Singles Chart. In 2004, it was re-recorded as a bonus track for the band's eighth album Deadwing.

== Background ==
The song was re-recorded in the studio by the then-current lineup during the Deadwing album sessions. Mikael Åkerfeldt of the band Opeth performed harmony vocals on that version. It was released as a bonus track on the American version of Deadwing.

About the re-recording, drummer Gavin Harrison said: "One DJ somewhere in the states said that it was his favorite song of all time and told the company that if we re-recorded it on Deadwing, he’d play it non-stop. Apparently, he didn’t play it at all. We didn’t want to re-record it."

== Track listing (regular CD) ==
1. "Shesmovedon" (Edit) – 3:50
2. "Cure for Optimism" – 6:13
3. "Untitled" – 8:52

== Track listing (limited CD) ==
1. "Shesmovedon" (Album Version) – 5:19
2. "Russia on Ice" (Demo Version) – 13:10

== Track listing (7" vinyl) ==
1. A/ "Shesmovedon" (Edit) – 3:50
2. B/ "Novak" – 3:50

== Personnel ==
All tracks written by Steven Wilson, except "Untitled" and "Russia on Ice" written by Barbieri, Edwin, Maitland and Wilson.

Although the first track on the limited edition CD is labeled "album version", it differs slightly from that version, as on the album the track segues into the next song "Last Chance To Evacuate Planet Earth Before It Is Recycled" while on the single it has a clean ending.

== Chart performance ==
Chart (2000)	Peak position
UK Indie (Official Charts)	24
UK Singles (Official Charts)	85
