= The Incident (album) =

Studio album by Porcupine Tree
- Released: 14 September 2009
- Recorded: 2009
- Genres: Progressive rock, progressive metal
- Length: 75:43
- Label: Roadrunner/Victor
- Producer: Porcupine Tree

Porcupine Tree chronology
Fear of a Blank Planet (2007)	The Incident (2009)	Closure/Continuation (2022)

Singles from The Incident
- 1. "Time Flies" Released: 11 August 2009

Steven Wilson chronology
Insurgentes (2008)	The Incident (2009)	Grace for Drowning (2011)

The Incident is the tenth studio album by British progressive rock band Porcupine Tree. It was released as a double album on 14 September 2009 by Roadrunner Records. The record was nominated for a Grammy Award for Best Surround Sound Album and reached the top 25 on both the US and UK albums charts. It was Porcupine Tree's last album before their extended hiatus, which lasted until 2021, as well as the last to feature bassist Colin Edwin.

== History ==
The band started recording the album in February 2009. This was confirmed by a post on their official website: "Writing for the next PT studio record is well underway, with the band recently spending two weeks scheduled in the English countryside working on new tracks. Recording of these pieces and a new 35-minute song cycle [written by Steven Wilson] were due to start in February..." A tour was announced on the band's website and MySpace, along with dates, following release of the new album. Around March and April, Wilson commented that the 35-minute song kept evolving, becoming a 55-minute song occupying the entire disc.

On 12 June 2009, details of The Incident were revealed on the Porcupine Tree website: "the record is set to be released via Roadrunner Records worldwide on 22 September as a double CD: the centre-piece is the title track, which takes up the whole of the first disc. The 55-minute work is described as a slightly surreal song cycle about beginnings and endings and the sense that 'after this, things will never be the same again'; the release date was later moved to 15 September. The self-produced album is completed by four standalone compositions that developed out of band writing sessions last December - Flicker, Bonnie the Cat, Black Dahlia, and Remember Me Lover feature on a separate EP length disc to stress their independence from the song cycle." On 13 July, the first preview of the album was posted at both Roadrunner and the band's MySpace pages. The track "Time Flies", described by Wilson as "sentimental" and the "centerpiece" of the album, became a music video directed by usual Porcupine Tree collaborator Lasse Hoile, along with an edited single.

A DVD-A edition was released on the Transmission Label as Transmission 11.1 through Burning Shed. On 12 April 2010, an acoustic version of "I Drive the Hearse" was released through the Roadrunner website. On 9 July 2010, a music video for "Bonnie the Cat" was published.

The chord progression in several songs on the record, particularly parts of "The Blind House" and "The Séance", is reused from the No-Man song "The Break-Up For Real" (from 2003's Together We're Stranger).

== Concept ==
The concept for The Incident emerged as Wilson was caught in a motorway traffic jam whilst driving past a road accident:

"There was a sign saying 'POLICE – INCIDENT' and everyone was slowing down to see what had happened... Afterwards, it struck me that 'incident' is a very detached word for something so destructive and traumatic for the people involved. And then I had the sensation that the spirit of someone that had died in the accident entered into my car and was sitting next to me. The irony of such a cold expression for such seismic events appealed to me, and I began to pick out other 'incidents' reported in the media and news, I wrote about the evacuation of teenage girls from a religious cult in Texas, a family terrorizing its neighbours, a body found floating in a river by some people on a fishing trip, and more. Each song is written in the first person and tries to humanize the detached media reportage".

— Steven Wilson

== Reception ==
Professional ratings
Aggregate scores
Source	Rating
Metacritic	72/100
Review scores
Source	Rating
Allmusic	3.5/5 stars
CHARTattack	4/5 stars
Caller-Times	3/5 stars
NOW	4/5 stars
PopMatters	7/10 stars
Radio City	4/5 stars
Rocksound	(9/10)
Rolling Stone	4/5 stars
Weekender	5/5 stars

In January 2010, Eclipsed magazine critics named The Incident their "Album of the Year" and also gave credit to the band for "Best Concert of The Year", while "Time Flies" reached No. 5 in the "Best Song of the Year" category.

Readers of the Teraz Rock Polish magazine voted Steven Wilson as the "Best Foreign Instrumentalist/Musician of 2009", surpassing other widely known artists, such as The Edge, Jerry Cantrell, Jack White, Kerry King, Kirk Hammett, Tom Morello, Mark Knopfler, and Omar Rodríguez-López.

Classic Rock magazine critics voted Porcupine Tree No. 1 "Best Band" and The Incident as No. 1 "Album of the Year"; The Incident tour was voted No. 4 and Gavin Harrison gained second place for "Best Drummer"; Steven Wilson achieved No. 4 as "Best Guitarist" and was chosen No. 1 "Prog Icon of 2009".

Once again, a Porcupine Tree song was chosen "Song of the Day" by NPR. "Drawing the Line" is the second NPR pick from the band since "Sentimental", off 2007's Fear of a Blank Planet.

Indian newspaper The Hindu commented on "Time Flies" by asserting, "The epic 11-minute track is simply one of Porcupine Tree's best. Embodied in melodic simplicity with a rhythmic strumming pattern, the piece undulates with cascading crescendos, a rumbling mid-section and a propulsive finish."

== Track listing ==
=== Disc one ===
The first disc of the album was intended to be a single 55-minute song, but it is segmented into 14 sequential tracks.

All lyrics written by Steven Wilson.

No.	Title	Music	Length
1.	"Occam's Razor"	Steven Wilson	1:55
2.	"The Blind House"	Wilson	5:47
3.	"Great Expectations"	Wilson	1:26
4.	"Kneel and Disconnect"	Wilson	2:03
5.	"Drawing the Line"	Wilson	4:43
6.	"The Incident"	Wilson	5:20
7.	"Your Unpleasant Family"	Wilson	1:48
8.	"The Yellow Windows of the Evening Train"	Wilson	2:00
9.	"Time Flies"	Wilson	11:40
10.	"Degree Zero of Liberty"	Wilson	1:45
11.	"Octane Twisted"	Porcupine Tree	5:03
12.	"The Séance"	Wilson	2:39
13.	"Circle of Manias"	Porcupine Tree	2:18
14.	"I Drive the Hearse"	Wilson	6:41
Total length:			55:08

=== Disc two ===
Disc 2 contains tracks recorded outside the song cycle. All lyrics written by Steven Wilson.

No.	Title	Music	Length
1.	"Flicker"	Porcupine Tree	3:42
2.	"Bonnie the Cat"	Porcupine Tree	5:45
3.	"Black Dahlia"	Richard Barbieri	3:40
4.	"Remember Me Lover"	Steven Wilson	7:28
Total length:			20:35

Some CD pressings and all DVD-A pressings combine both discs on one single disc.

Japanese & iTunes bonus tracks
No.	Title	Writer(s)	Length
5.	"Way Out of Here" (Live)	Porcupine Tree	7:49
6.	"What Happens Now?" (Live)	Porcupine Tree	8:09

These two bonus tracks were recorded in Tilburg, The Netherlands, in 2008 for the live DVD Anesthetize.

=== DVD-A edition ===
No.	Title	Music	Length
2.	"Flicker"	Porcupine Tree	3:42
3.	"Bonnie the Cat"	Porcupine Tree	5:45
4.	"Black Dahlia"	Richard Barbieri	3:40
5.	"Remember Me Lover"	Steven Wilson	7:28
6.	"Extra Features: Time Flies Video; Octane Twisted Film; TV spot; Photo Gallery"

== Personnel ==
=== Porcupine Tree ===
- Porcupine Tree – arrangements
  - Steven Wilson – vocals, guitars, keyboards, mixing
  - Colin Edwin – bass, double bass
  - Richard Barbieri – synthesizers, keyboards
  - Gavin Harrison – drums, percussion

=== Production ===
- Engineers: Steve Orchard, John Wesley (engineered guitars)
- Mastering: Jon Astley (stereo), Darcy Proper (5.1)

== Charts ==
Chart performance for The Incident
Chart (2009)	Peak position
Australian Albums (ARIA)	35
Austrian Albums (Ö3 Austria)	45
Belgian Albums (Ultratop Flanders)	79
Belgian Albums (Ultratop Wallonia)	40
Canadian Albums (Billboard)	23
Dutch Albums (Album Top 100)	5
Finnish Albums (Suomen virallinen lista)	11
French Albums (SNEP)	35
German Albums (Offizielle Top 100)	17
Italian Albums (FIMI)	33
Norwegian Albums (VG-lista)	19
Polish Albums (ZPAV)	5
Spanish Albums (Promusicae)	77
Swedish Albums (Sverigetopplistan)	23
Swiss Albums (Schweizer Hitparade)	20
UK Albums (Official Charts)	23
UK Rock & Metal Albums (Official Charts)	2
US Billboard 200	25
US Top Rock Albums (Billboard)	7
