= Stupid Dream =

Studio album by Porcupine Tree
- Released: 22 March 1999
- Recorded: January–November 1998
- Studios: Foel Studio; No Man's Land
- Genres: Progressive rock; alternative rock
- Length: 59:55
- Labels: Kscope, Snapper
- Producer: Steven Wilson

Porcupine Tree chronology
| Signify (1996) | Stupid Dream (1999) | Lightbulb Sun (2000) |

2006 reissue
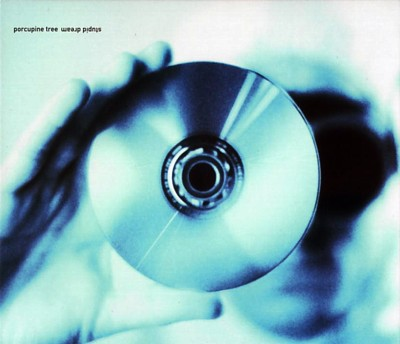
- Digitally remastered CD-DVDA

Singles from Stupid Dream
- 1. "Piano Lessons" Released: 26 April 1999; 2. "Stranger by the Minute" Released: October 1999; 3. "Pure Narcotic" Released: 22 November 1999

Stupid Dream is the fifth studio album by British progressive rock band Porcupine Tree. It was first released in March 1999 in the UK, internationally on 6 April 1999, and then re-released on 15 May 2006 due to the band's rising popularity on major record label Lava Records with their releases of In Absentia in 2002 and Deadwing in 2005. The album, along with Lightbulb Sun in 2000, represented a transitional period for the band, moving away from the band's earlier work in instrumental and psychedelic music, but before they took a more metal direction in 2002 onwards. The album takes a commercially accessible pop rock sound while still retaining heavy progressive rock influences.

The album's title is a reference to frontman Steven Wilson's view of the music industry; while many aspire to be a musician for fame and glamorous lifestyle, he feels it is a "stupid dream" because it actually leads to a life of hard work and struggle.

== Background ==
=== Origins ===
Frontman Steven Wilson explained the transitional period for the band at the time, stating:

...the earlier years were characterized for me by this idea of the extended composition that was largely based on jamming or textures or drones or space rock or whatever you want to call it. I felt I could draw towards learning more about song craft and the construction of songs and actually creating hooks and choruses and using vocals in a more kind of solid way. So...when I came back later on to making the longer form of composition, it wasn’t in the same way that I’d been doing in the early years. They were much more structured and they had that kind of songwriter’s discipline that I guess I explored and learned on the earlier albums like Stupid Dream and Lightbulb Sun. So it was certainly an important step...

Wilson said that the album marked a transition away from "abstract instrumentality" into more "natural songwriting" also due to the influence of the music he had been listening to since the release of their last album, Signify in 1996. These artists included Jeff Buckley, Soundgarden, Brian Wilson, Todd Rundgren, and Crosby, Stills, Nash and Young.

=== Recording ===
The album was recorded at Foel Studios in Llanfair Caereinion, Wales, and at No Man's Land Studios at Hemel Hempstead, England. Wilson stated that it was the first time that the band sat down and recorded a whole album in one extended period, rather than sporadically as with past albums. He contends that this helped the band "experiment and collaborate on a cohesive sound for the album" and that the album "contains our most vertically complex music, as opposed to horizontally complex (whereby the tracks comprise simple sections, but many of them strung together). Here the songs are relatively tightly structured but much more layered than anything we had attempted before." The band also had a much larger budget than in the past; the album production cost £15,000, compared to only £2,000 for their previous album Signify. This enabled them to bring in an orchestra to record parts for the album. Strings were arranged by Chris Thorpe and Wilson and performed by the East of England Orchestra.

Keyboardist Richard Barbieri took a different approach to the album's recording as well:

A much more sophisticated sound and meticulous attention to detail defines my approach on this album. Steven came up with a strong selection of songs and a long process followed during which we attempted to condense as many ideas, flavours and colours into the arrangements as possible. Orchestra, flute and saxophone added further to the eclectic mix and I also feel that we started to focus more of what each other was contributing. Nearly all my work was completed within an intense 7-day session in Wales. Before the sessions we had decided that the keyboards used would be analogue only. Much of my work was spontaneous performance recorded onto hard disk, which allowed me to adopt an approach whereby multiple takes and parts could be recorded and edited and compiled later on - a much more creative way of working than always looking for the one "perfect" take. But the other side to the recording was getting the pre-written parts worked out and played as well as possible, things like the mellotron and Hammond organ parts.

The album was finished in late 1998 and released in March 1999. The band's next album, Lightbulb Sun, was recorded so closely after the Stupid Dream sessions that Wilson later reflected that they sounded like "two parts of a double record". Songs from these sessions that were ultimately left off both albums were later compiled onto the b-side album Recordings in 2001.

=== Concept ===
The lyrics of the album were much more personal to Wilson than they had been in previous Porcupine Tree albums. Wilson said the album deals with his own personal "insecurities and feelings" and "the usual singer-songwriter stuff", because he believed the most relatable and affecting lyrics were from a personal point of view. Much of the personal lyrics are also about his relationship and views on the music industry:

When I was writing some of the songs of the album I was very much aware of this contradiction between being an artist, being a musician, trying to be creative and write songs and, then, at the point you finish an album, the music is finished, the creative side is finished, you then have to go out and sell and market and promote. And that's like a completely different experience. It's not a very creative process. It's quite - in some ways - a cynical process going on having to sell your music. But you have to do it. I mean, if a modern musician is going to survive as a musician, you have to - in a sense - 'prostitute yourself' to try and sell your music and your art. And I was very much aware of that contradiction. If you think about that too much, it can drive you crazy, you know. It's an absurd thing to be doing. That kind of led me thinking about when I was a teenager, when I was just starting out and I was interested in being a musician. And I think a lot of teenage kids have this dream of being pop stars, of being a professional musician. This 'stupid dream' of being famous and 'life is a ball and everything is wonderful'. And, of course, actually the reality is that being a professional musician is a very hard work. It can be very heartbreaking, there's a lot of disappointment, there's a lot of hard work, there's a lot of travelling.

The album cover photography, taken by Robert Harding, is linked to the album's concept as well. Wilson stated:

Like sitting down with the record company to discuss how we're gonna market this album. And at that point your record becomes a product. And I just had this image of these CDs just coming off this conveyor belt. And obviously it's at complete odds with the music. But I wanted to have this kind of contradictory feel to the color. The bottom line is, the people that get into Porcupine Tree know that we're exactly not the kind of band that ever consider our music in terms of product and shifting units. So I thought it would kind of be fun to put an image on the album which is a comment on that. What could be a more stupid dream than wanting to make music and sell it.

== Song details ==
=== Singles ===
Three singles were released from the album: "Piano Lessons", "Stranger by the Minute", and "Pure Narcotic". "Piano Lessons" was the first single for the album and was released just a week prior to the album's release. A music video was made in which band members used signs referencing ironic marketing terminology, related to the album's concept of being part of the music industry as a "stupid dream". "Stranger by the Minute" was the second single from the album. The song itself features a harmonization in the chorus, between Wilson and drummer Chris Maitland, his only vocal performance on the whole album. Wilson also plays the bass on the song, instead of bassist Colin Edwin. "Pure Narcotic" was the third and final single from the album. This track features acoustic guitars, close harmony vocals, glockenspiel, pastoral piano and lyrics. The lyrics make a reference to Radiohead's album The Bends: "You keep me hating, You keep me listening to 'The Bends'."

=== Other songs ===
"Even Less" was originally 17 minutes long, but Wilson decided to only use the first 7 minutes for the Stupid Dream album version. A separate, second 7-minute section of the song was released on the CD single of "Stranger by the Minute", and a combined version of 14 minutes in length was later released on their 2001 Recordings compilation album. Additionally, a 15-minute demo version of the song with alternate lyrics can only be found in the special edition of the "Four Chords That Made a Million" single. At the end of the track a woman can be heard repeating the pattern of numbers: "0096 2251 2110 8105". About these numbers, Wilson stated: "The counting in 'Even Less' is taken from a recording of a shortwave numbers station. It is understood that these stations are used by intelligence agencies to transmit coded messages to overseas operatives, although no government agency has ever acknowledged the existence of these stations or what their actual purpose might be. They are virtually impossible to decode without the key since the message and its key are generated at random."

The song "Stupid Dream" is actually only a short, 28 second instrumental piece of a tuning orchestra and sound effects. "Slave Called Shiver", and "Don't Hate Me", according to Wilson, are about feelings of "unreturned love". He said of them, "[A Slave Called Shiver]'s a very perverse love song, yeah. I mean, it's an unrequited love song. It's a love song with somebody who's obsessed with someone else, but none of that affection is returned. It relates very closely to 'Don't Hate Me', which is a song again about someone who's obsessed with someone from afar. 'Don't Hate Me' is an even more extreme version, because here this person actually begins to follow and make phone calls and, you know, it becomes very unhealthy. 'Slave Called Shiver' is slightly less extreme. It's about someone who's very much in love and obsessed with somebody else. That love is not returned and so there's a slightly violent perverse undercurrent. 'Pure Narcotic' also is very much the same subject". "Don't Hate Me" featured the first use of saxophone in the music of Porcupine Tree, courtesy of Theo Travis. During live performances, the flute and saxophone solos are replaced by Barbieri's keyboard and Wilson guitar solos respectively.

"This Is No Rehearsal" has been described as a mixture of "semi-acoustic segments with desperate vocals and heavy metal raves". Wilson said it "...was directly inspired by a tragic UK event a few years ago. A child was taken from a shopping mall while his mother was momentarily distracted and was later found dead and tortured near a railway track. The most disturbing thing about the story was that the two abductors/murderers turned out to be children themselves".

"Baby Dream in Cellophane" is a short psychedelic track. Colin Edwin does not appear in this track, Wilson plays the bass instead. Wilson has said of the song, "The baby in the song is basically singing the song: 'I am in my pram'. And it's quite a cynical song because he's basically saying that the boy's life is almost mapped out already as the child is born, it's already predetermined by society and the baby's kind of singing from the pram if you like, saying 'well, actually no, I'm not going to go down this path that's been laid out for me. I'm gonna break out.' It's almost like a very surreal teen rebellion song."

In "A Smart Kid" Wilson returns to a topic he has touched on before in "Radioactive Toy", a track from their first album, On the Sunday of Life.... The lyrics deal with a sole survivor after a possible apocalyptic war that gets picked up by an exploring spaceship.

"Tinto Brass" is the only song on the album credited to the whole band, not just Wilson, and was named after Italian director Tinto Brass. The track is an instrumental, with the exception of a spoken word part. Regarding that part of the song, Wilson said: "Oh, yes, it's spoken in Japanese! It's my girlfriend who's Japanese and she's got a film book. I tell you it's so difficult to find anything on Tinto Brass in England. He's completely unknown... And then my girlfriend... found this little biography: where he was born, the films he made. So she said, 'well, should I translate that for you?' (because I wanted it to be spoken in the track) and I said 'No, it's great' — I thought — 'I'll have it in Japanese'. So she just read it in Japanese. But it's just a list of his films and where he's from... It's nothing interesting".

The album is closed with the track "Stop Swimming". Wilson said of its meaning, "I found that when I was writing the music for this album a lot of the songs were about me and my relationship with the music industry and how I felt about where I was going in the music business and all that. Things like 'Stop Swimming'... maybe it's time to stop swimming... and this kind of whole impulse to just give up and go with the flow can be very strong sometimes. I mean I've never given into it. I never will." Additionally, from the Warszawa live album liner notes, he said, "This is a very sad song, but if you're like me, I always find the saddest music is also the most beautiful and this is one of my favorite songs that I've ever written"

== Reception ==
Professional ratings
Review scores
| Source | Rating |
|---|---|
| AllMusic | 4.5/5 stars |
| Ox-Fanzine | 9/10 |
| Pitchfork | 3.5/10 |
| Record Collector | 5/5 stars |
| Rock Hard | 9/10 |
| Sound and Vision | 4/5 stars |
| Sputnikmusic | 4.5/5 stars |

Reception for the album has been generally positive. Billboard praised the album, saying it contained some of Wilson's best lyrics, and favorably compared the album to the work of the band Radiohead. AllMusic praised the songwriting and dynamics of the album, stating "Wilson as a songwriter and singer both sounds recharged and more ambitious, while the group collectively pours it on. The loud passages feel truly sky-smashing, the calmer ones perfectly close, and the overall sense of build and drama -- "A Smart Kid" is a fine example—spot-on." In 2005, Stupid Dream was ranked number 339 in Rock Hard magazine's book The 500 Greatest Rock & Metal Albums of All Time. Classic Rock listed the album at No. 61 on its "100 Greatest Albums of the 90s."

In October 2011, it was awarded a gold certification from the Independent Music Companies Association (IMPALA), which indicated sales in excess of 75,000 copies throughout Europe.

== Track listing ==
All songs written by Steven Wilson, except "Tinto Brass", which is credited to all four band members.

| No. | Title | Length |
|---|---|---|
| 1. | "Even Less" | 7:11 |
| 2. | "Piano Lessons" | 4:21 |
| 3. | "Stupid Dream" | 0:28 |
| 4. | "Pure Narcotic" | 5:02 |
| 5. | "Slave Called Shiver" | 4:40 |
| 6. | "Don't Hate Me" | 8:30 |
| 7. | "This Is No Rehearsal" | 3:26 |
| 8. | "Baby Dream in Cellophane" | 3:15 |
| 9. | "Stranger by the Minute" | 4:30 |
| 10. | "A Smart Kid" | 5:22 |
| 11. | "Tinto Brass" | 6:17 |
| 12. | "Stop Swimming" | 6:53 |
| Total length: | | 59:55 |

2006 Re-release

The re-release was in the form of both a 2 disc CD/DVD-A set, and double vinyl LP. The double vinyl LP was only available through the band's official store, Burning Shed. The CD contains a new mix of the album by Wilson, and the DVD-A contains a 5.1 surround mix, the video for "Piano Lessons", and two bonus tracks, the full 14-minute version of "Even Less", and "Ambulance Chasing", both previously released on Recordings in 2001. The Korean edition of Stupid Dream included the "Piano Lessons" video as well.

2026 Re-release

The re-release is in the form of a double LP pressed on clear vinyl. The clear double vinyl LP is only available through the band's official store, Burning Shed. It appears to be no different from the 2006 re-release in content.

== Personnel ==
Band

- Steven Wilson – vocals, guitars, piano, samples, bass on "Baby Dream in Cellophane" and "Stranger by the Minute"
- Richard Barbieri – analogue synthesizers, hammond organ, mellotron, piano on "Even Less", glockenspiel on "Pure Narcotic"
- Colin Edwin – bass guitar, double bass on "Stop Swimming"
- Chris Maitland – drums, percussion, backing vocals on "Stranger by the Minute"

Guest musicians

- Theo Travis – flute on "Tinto Brass" and "Don't Hate Me", saxophone on "Don't Hate Me"
- East of England Orchestra – strings (conducted by Nicholas Kok)

Other

- Produced by Steven Wilson
- Recorded by Elliot Ness & Chris Thorpe
- Mixed by Dominique Brethes
