= Lightbulb Sun =

Studio album by Porcupine Tree
- Released: 22 May 2000
- Recorded: November 1999 – January 2000
- Studios: Foel Studio, Llanfair Caereinion, & No Man's Land, Hemel Hempstead, Britain
- Genres: Progressive rock; alternative rock
- Length: 56:17
- Label: Snapper
- Producer: Steven Wilson

Porcupine Tree chronology
Stupid Dream (1999)	Lightbulb Sun (2000)	Voyage 34: The Complete Trip (2000)

Singles from Lightbulb Sun
- 1. "Four Chords That Made a Million" Released: 1 May 2000; 2. "Shesmovedon" Released: 10 July 2000

Lightbulb Sun is the sixth studio album by British progressive rock band Porcupine Tree, first released in May 2000, and later reissued in 2008 on CD, DVD-A surround sound, and vinyl.

This album, along with their prior album Stupid Dream, is considered to have a more commercial, poppier sound, as opposed to the abstract instrumental sound of their prior albums, or the heavier metal sound in their subsequent albums of the 2000s. The album is divided into two parts between "The Rest Will Flow" and "Hatesong". The first part concentrates more on melodic, pop elements of Porcupine Tree's style, while the second has a more experimental character.

== Writing and recording ==
Shortly after the album was completed, frontman Steven Wilson remarked that album was "the quickest album we ever made" (in 3 months flat) and yet still "our best work to date". It was released a mere 14 months after their previous album, Stupid Dream. Lyrically, Wilson had tired of writing about abstract concepts like war or religion, and felt he had the confidence to write more personal and emotional lyrics, leading to some especially negative lyrics being displayed in tracks such as "Hatesong" and "Feel So Low".

Musically, Wilson stated he wanted to bring back some of the experimental aspects they had moved away from on Stupid Dream, stating "Richard [Barbieri] and I worked on creating some unique keyboard sounds for the album – e.g. the 'fairground' on 'How is Your Life Today?' and the 'insects' at the end of 'Russia on Ice'". He also spoke of the influence of metal music on the album, stating, "... part of the beauty of the guitar solo on 'Where We Would Be' comes from the fact that it was played relatively straight but then fed through so many distortion and lo-fi processes that it began to fizz and disintegrate. The riffing guitars on 'Russia on Ice' are pure metal and one of the solos of 'Hatesong' I call my 'Korn solo' because the bottom strings on the guitar are tuned down so low that the notes can be bent several tones". Conversely, the band added more unconventional instruments to the compositions as well, such as the banjo, hammered dulcimers, and more string sections. String sections in Lightbulb Sun were arranged and produced by Dave Gregory from alternative rock band XTC at Christchurch Studios, Clifton, Bristol in January 2000, recorded by John Waterhouse.

Wilson describes the album as more organic sounding than his previous albums, stating that, "In a song like 'Winding Shot' [the name for the first half of the track 'Last Chance to Evacuate Planet Earth ...'] there are shades of Crosby, Stills, Nash and Young and Nick Drake, although the end result is hopefully pure Porcupine Tree. This effect is accentuated by the fact that many of the instruments and vocals on the album are much more up front and given less of a sheen than on Stupid Dream ... Organic is the word I like to use."

Richard Barbieri described his approach to his keyboard playing, saying that "... Much of my keyboard experimenting took place on tracks like 'Russia on Ice', 'Last Chance to Evacuate Planet Earth ...', 'Feel So Low' and '4 Chords That Made a Million', while other tracks didn't seem to need a great deal of keyboards. I'm not one for playing all over a track if I can't see a genuine need for it."

Many songs from Lightbulb Sun and Stupid Dream recording sessions, that were left off their respective albums, were later released on the B-side compilations album Recordings in 2001.

== Song details ==
Wilson states that, while there is no unifying theme or concept behind the album,

"There are at least four or five songs on that record which I call the divorce songs, the relationship songs, which are all about various stages of the splitting up a relationship, of dissolving a relationship. Russia on Ice, How Is Your Life Today, Shesmovedon, Feel So Low, I mean, the last track of the album. The period in a relationship, where the relationship is kind of... still exists, but it's in that period where, really, there is nothing left but hatred and despise - Hatesong is the other one. But then on the other hand, there are groups of songs on the album which are all about various childhood... nostalgic childhood reminisces, Lightbulb Sun and the first part of Last Chance To Evacuate Planet Earth, Where We Would Be. So there are kind of groups of songs. And then there's a couple of songs that don't have any relation to anything else. Four Chords That Made A Million doesn't have any relation to anything else on the album, or anything else I've ever written. It's just that."

The tracks "Four Chords That Made a Million", "Where We Would Be" and "Russia on Ice" were premiered during the Stupid Dream tour in 1999, several months before Lightbulb Sun's release.

The track "Last Chance to Evacuate Planet Earth Before It Is Recycled" features a speech by the leader of the Heaven's Gate religious cult. This U.S. cult believed that they were from another planet and only visiting Earth. In order to return to their own "dimension" before Earth was "recycled", such extraterrestrial entities must find each other and commit mass suicide. The words are taken from the video they made before killing themselves to explain to the rest of the world why they had done it.

The track "The Rest Will Flow" is slower on the remaster, due to having been sped up from its originally recorded speed in the original master in order to make it more "radio-friendly". It originally was in danger of being left off the album altogether, as some band members questioned if it fit in with the rest of the album, but Wilson ultimately kept it on, arguing that it had "single potential". The song was in fact intended to be the album's third single, scheduled for October 2000 release, but it was cancelled for undisclosed reasons.

The song "Feel So Low" was re-recorded in 2004 by Blackfield, which is a project that consists of Porcupine Tree's Steven Wilson and Israeli singer/songwriter Aviv Geffen. The first verse of that version was sung in Hebrew by Geffen. This version only made it to the vinyl edition of the first Blackfield album. Later live renditions of this track by Blackfield were sung entirely in English but differed significantly from the Porcupine Tree original, as they added a long, heavy instrumental section at the end.

Wilson believes that the track "Buying New Soul", which was later only released on the b-side compilation Recordings and the 2008 reissue of the album, probably would have been included on the original release of the album had it been written and completed a few months earlier.

== Reception ==
Professional ratings
Review scores
Source	Rating
Allmusic	4/5 stars
ARTISTdirect	3.5/5 stars
Drowned in Sound	8/10
Kerrang!	3/5 stars
Ox-Fanzine	9/10
Pitchfork	6.7/10
Rock Hard	8.5/10
Sound and Vision	4/5 stars
Sputnikmusic	4.5/5 stars

Reception for the album has been largely positive. Classic Rock magazine described the album as "an album of stunning songs and startling musicianship… breathtaking." Allmusic praised the album's quality and its more commercial direction, and called the tracks "Feel So Low" and "The Rest Will Flow" "flat out two of Wilson's best tunes anywhere." Sputnikmusic praised the album as an "incredible work that shows the vast amount of ideas and amazing gift of songwriting that Steven Wilson possessed in the late 1990's." They note that Lightbulb Sun bridges the gap between the band's "spacey progressive past and their metallic, riffy future." ArtistDirect warned that while it is different than later Porcupine Tree releases such as Fear of a Blank Planet, and conventional progressive rock in general, "Porcupine Tree achieves something altogether more enjoyable here. And, while audiophiles may find the dense harmonies and musical arrangements intriguing in surround sound, the strength of Lightbulb Sun is in melancholic melodies that would sound every bit as good in mono." The Real Musician music website echoed similar sentiments, and considered it to be "the last 'old' Porcupine Tree cd" (prior to their move into a more metal direction with 2002's In Absentia), and continued "Out of that old band, Lightbulb Sun is the very best album they created".

Many reviewers felt the album sounded similar to the work of Pink Floyd. The album has also been praised for being more accessible than most progressive rock, with Bill Kopp of Musoscribe stating "Lightbulb Sun is, like all (Porcupine Tree), really, very accessible stuff. In many ways, Porcupine Tree can serve as a listener's entree into a heretofore unexplored genre: if you're a rock fan but not so into prog, (it) can ease you in gently. If...you're no metal fan, the band ... can show you the benefits of that genre without going all Metallica on you."

In October 2011, it was awarded a gold certification from the Independent Music Companies Association (IMPALA), which indicated sales in excess of 75,000 copies throughout Europe.

== Track listing ==
All tracks by Wilson except "Hatesong" (Edwin, Wilson) and "Russia on Ice" (Barbieri, Edwin, Maitland, Wilson). Arrangements by Porcupine Tree.

No.	Title	Length
1.	"Lightbulb Sun"	5:31
2.	"How Is Your Life Today?"	2:46
3.	"Four Chords That Made a Million"	3:36
4.	"Shesmovedon"	5:13
5.	"Last Chance to Evacuate Planet Earth Before It Is Recycled: Winding Shot (Summer, 1981); Last Chance to Evacuate Planet Earth Before it is Recycled"	4:48
6.	"The Rest Will Flow"	3:14
7.	"Hatesong"	8:26
8.	"Where We Would Be"	4:12
9.	"Russia on Ice"	13:03
10.	"Feel So Low"	5:18
Total length:		56:07

German tour edition bonus disc
No.	Title	Writer(s)	Length
1.	"Buying New Soul (Edit)"	Barbieri, Edwin, Maitland, Wilson	6:07
2.	"Pure Narcotic" (Same version as one on Stupid Dream)		5:14
3.	"Tinto Brass" (Live at Southampton University)	Barbieri, Edwin, Maitland, Wilson	6:43
4.	"The Rest Will Flow (string section)" (hidden track)	Barbieri, Edwin, Maitland, Wilson	2:05

=== 2008 Reissues ===
A reissue of Lightbulb Sun was released on 21 April 2008 through Kscope as 2 disc set; or a 3 disc set for the first 5,000 pre-ordered copies. Disc one is a CD containing a remastered version of the original album, while disc two is a DVD-A containing the album remixed into 5.1 surround sound. Disc 2 also contains three bonus tracks at the end: "Disappear", "Buying New Soul", and "Cure for Optimism", which were recorded during the same sessions. A limited edition third disc contains two instrumental tracks: "Novak", the b-side to the original 7" "Shesmovedon" single; and "Buying New Soul (Instrumental Backing Track)", the original version of "Buying New Soul", with 4 minutes more music that were cut at the same time as the vocals were overdubbed.

A double vinyl edition of the remaster was released through Tonefloat on 8 July 2008, in memory of Michael Piper, a member of the Porcupine Tree crew, founder of the Gates of Dawn record label, who died in April 2008. It was available in a limited run of 1,000 numbered copies on 180 grams coloured vinyl in gatefold picture sleeve and a regular edition on 180 grams black vinyl in gatefold picture sleeve.

Side 1
No.	Title	Length
1.	"Lightbulb Sun"	5:31
2.	"How Is Your Life Today?"	2:46
3.	"Four Chords That Made a Million"	3:36
4.	"Shesmovedon"	5:14
5.	"Last Chance to Evacuate Planet Earth Before It Is Recycled"	4:49

Side 2
No.	Title	Length
1.	"The Rest Will Flow"	3:18
2.	"Hatesong"	8:30
3.	"Where We Would Be"	4:13

Side 3
No.	Title	Length
1.	"Russia on Ice"	13:05
2.	"Feel So Low"	5:22

Side 4
No.	Title	Length
1.	"Disappear"	3:40
2.	"Buying New Soul"	10:26
3.	"Cure for Optimism"	6:36

== Personnel ==
Band

- Steven Wilson – vocals, guitars, piano, mellotron, hammered dulcimer, samples, banjo, harp, production
- Richard Barbieri – synthesizers, Hammond organ, Fender Rhodes, clavinet, mellotron
- Colin Edwin – bass, drum machine, guimbri
- Chris Maitland – drums, backing vocals

Additional musicians

- Stuart Gordon – violin, viola
- Nick Parry – cello
- Eli Hibit – backup rhythm guitar

The Minerva String Quartet

- Katy Latham – violin
- Lisa Betteridge – violin
- Sarah Heins – viola
- Emmeline Brewer – cello

Other personnel

- Chris Blair – mastering
- John Foxx – cover photograph, additional photography
- Luigi Colasanti Antonelli – group portraits, other photography
