= Deadwing =

2005 album by Porcupine Tree

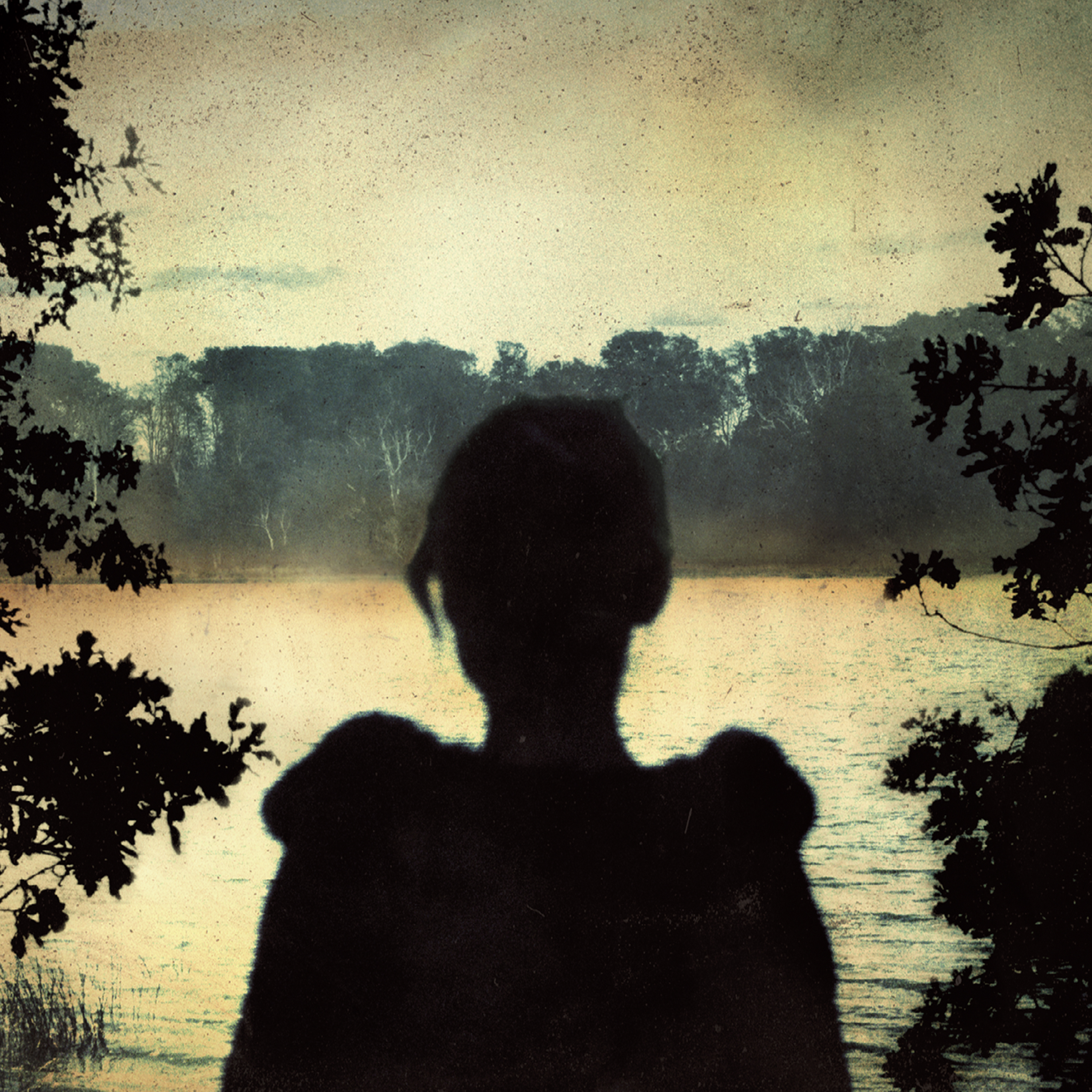

Studio album by Porcupine Tree
- Released: 28 March 2005
- Recorded: Various English cities March–October 2004
- Genres: Progressive rock; progressive metal; alternative metal
- Length: 59:35 (Europe/original edition); 64:34 (US edition); 79:07 (DVD-A edition)
- Label: Lava
- Producers: Steven Wilson; Gavin Harrison; Richard Barbieri

Porcupine Tree chronology
| In Absentia (2002) | Deadwing (2005) | Fear of a Blank Planet (2007) |

Singles from Deadwing
- 1. "Shallow" Released: 22 February 2005; 2. "Lazarus" Released: 14 March 2005

Professional ratings
Review scores
| Source | Rating |
|---|---|
| AllMusic | 3/5 stars |
| DIY | 4/5 stars |
| Kludge | 9/10 |
| KNAC | favourable |
| Metal Storm | 10/10 |
| musicOMH | favourable |
| Record Collector | 5/5 stars |
| Rock Hard | 8.5/10 |
| Sputnikmusic | 4.5/5 |
| Virgin Media | favourable |

Deadwing is the eighth studio album by British progressive rock band Porcupine Tree, released by Lava Records in Europe on 28 March 2005, and in the US on 26 April. It quickly became the band's best selling album, although it was later surpassed by Fear of a Blank Planet. The album is based on a screenplay written by Steven Wilson and Mike Bennion, and is a ghost story. Wilson has stated that the songs "Deadwing", "Lazarus", "Arriving Somewhere but Not Here", "Open Car", and "Mellotron Scratch" were originally intended for the film soundtrack, but when the project failed to find funding they were instead recorded for the next Porcupine Tree album. The album versions of "Lazarus" and "Open Car" essentially remain Wilson solo tracks onto which Gavin Harrison overdubbed drums.

The album produced two singles: "Shallow" and "Lazarus". Music videos for "Lazarus", "The Start of Something Beautiful", and "Glass Arm Shattering" were produced. "Shallow" also appeared in the movie Four Brothers.

The album includes collaborations with King Crimson's Adrian Belew, who plays guitar solos on the title track and "Halo", and Opeth's Mikael Åkerfeldt, who adds vocal harmonies on "Deadwing", "Lazarus", and "Arriving Somewhere but Not Here". He also plays the second guitar solo on "Arriving Somewhere but Not Here".

In 2017, Kscope Records purchased the album as well as the previous album In Absentia; both were remastered and rereleased in 2018 through the label, with the new versions having less compression and an overall improvement in sound quality.

== Background ==
=== Concept ===
Steven Wilson described the album as a surreal "ghost story", and said that "the idea is ultimately that this album will form a kind of companion with the feature film." He stated that David Lynch and Stanley Kubrick were major influences for the script. On 1 September 2006, Wilson announced in his blog that Mike Bennion (co-writer of the Deadwing screenplay) had released the first fifteen pages of the story. The film script thus far has made several connections to the album, including a reference to the line in "Mellotron Scratch" ("A tiny flame inside my hand"), the man mentioned in "Lazarus" ("My David don't you worry"), and to the artwork in the album's cover insert.

While introducing the song "Lazarus" during the Shepherds Bush Empire concert in December 2005, Steven Wilson explained that this song was about a mother communicating with her young son "from the grave".

On 3 January 2019, Steven Wilson posted on Facebook that he and Bennion had recently "reactivated and rewritten [the script] with a view to trying again [to make the film]", but that the name of the script had changed. Wilson also revealed that the "David" from the song "Lazarus" is the main character in the Deadwing script.

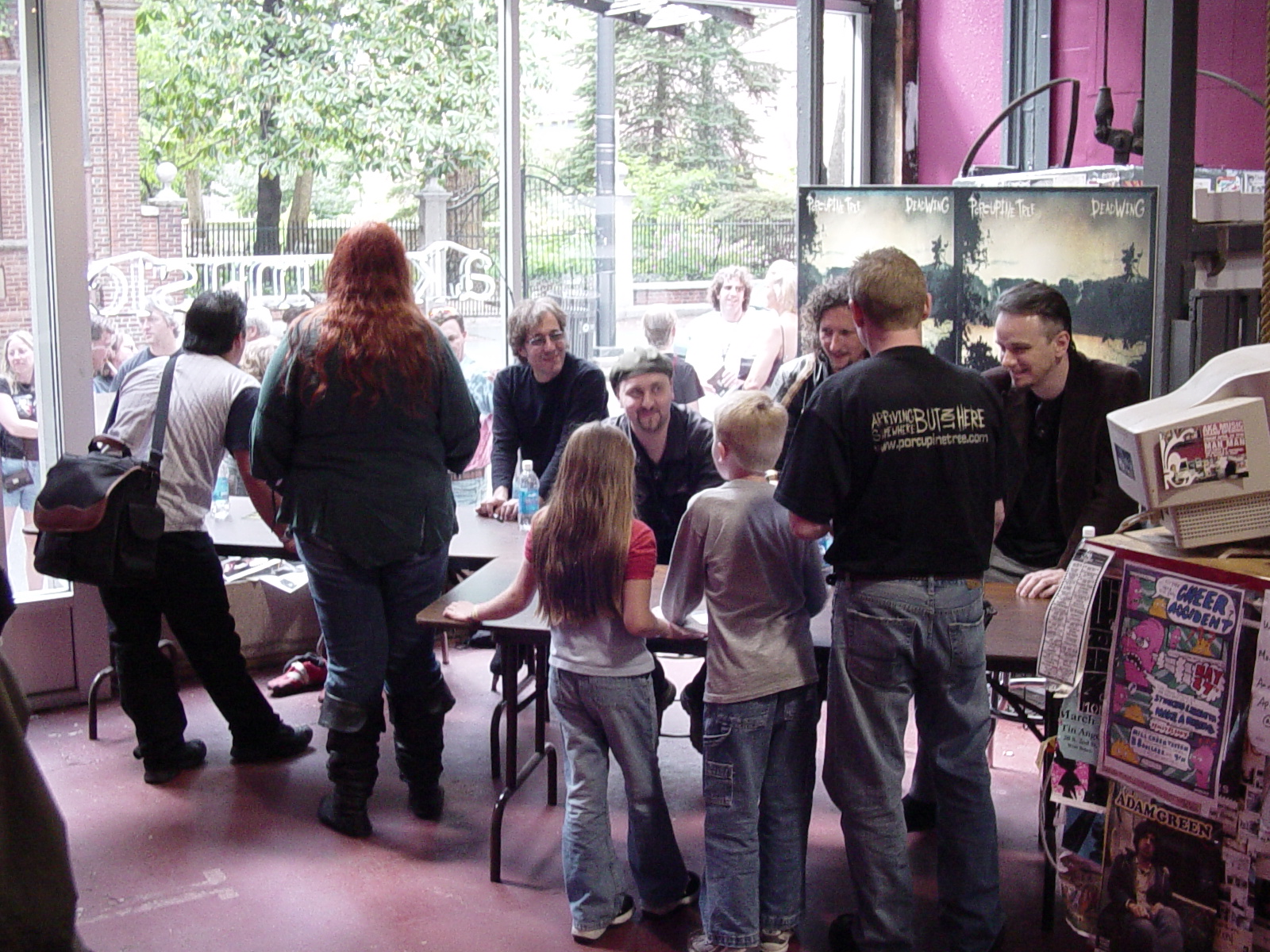
The members of Porcupine Tree during a meet-and-greet at AKA Records on Second Street in Philadelphia on 21 May 2005.

=== Note on loudness war ===
In a comment on the loudness war, Steven Wilson mentioned how he considered placing a message on record sleeves that reads as follows: "Please note that this record may not be mastered as loudly as some of the other records in your collection. This is in order to retain the dynamic range and subtlety of the music. Please, use your volume knob." Conversely, the CD version of the album has been proven to contain clipping and dynamic range compression, whereas the 5.1 surround mix on the DVD-A version does not. However, subsequent releases Fear of a Blank Planet and Nil Recurring are mastered at lower levels, preserving more of their original dynamic range.

== Song details ==
The members of the band have made several evaluations of the album's tracks over the years.

"Deadwing" – Steven, "A ten-minute piece that's very in-your-face and has no real chorus, so it's an ambitious way to start the record. A very unconventional piece of music. It's a statement of intent, a willfully uncommercial gesture." It is interesting to note that the pulsing keyboard sound at the start of the song is similar to that used by Steven on 'First Regret', which opened his 2015 LP, Hand. Cannot. Erase.

"Shallow" – Steven explained, "The big rock moment of the record, an irresistible riff with a Zep or Soundgarden vibe to it. The equivalent of a big, dumb rock song, but in the way that people who are not dumb would do it." Richard remarked, "I tell you what I didn't like on Deadwing and that's a track called 'Shallow'. It's so out of context for Porcupine Tree. It really didn't feel like Porcupine Tree to me. It just had too much of a knowing sound to it. American kind of rock. There wasn't that naivety about it or that honesty about it." Steven Wilson later admitted in an interview that "Shallow" was written and recorded after pressure from the record label to create a radio-friendly hit off the album.

"Lazarus" – keyboardist Richard Barbieri's evaluation, "The beautiful side of Porcupine Tree. Very mellow and delicate, in the contemporary style of Coldplay or Radiohead."

"Halo" – Steven clarified, "Well, 'Halo' was on Deadwing, as Deadwing, as you probably know, is based on this film script I wrote. And there is a religious aspect in the script, there is a religious cult in the script. But the song itself 'Halo' takes that as a starting point and develops into another kind of idea. It is about the born again Christianity, the born again religious parts, the self-righteousness of those kind of people." Bassist Colin Edwin added his thoughts on 'Halo', "We came up with that round Gavin's place whilst having a group session for Deadwing. Bits of that came from Gavin having an idea in 17/16. That was pretty much a group thing. It came together quite quickly." Gavin's inspiration came about during his regular drum experiments and, with the rest of the band on board, they spent an hour working on the idea in Gavin's home studio where the writing sessions would usually take place. Steven subsequently took their work away and formed the song. Richard explained, "Gavin and I came up with this infectious groove. Has an industrial feel a la Nine Inch Nails; quirky, abrasive, and repetitive with distorted vocals, and an extraordinarily strange Adrian Belew guitar solo."

"Arriving Somewhere but Not Here" – Steven explained, "The centre-piece of the record. The most ambitious track in terms of its horizontal complexity, and its length, thirteen minutes. Slowly develops from an ambient keyboard intro. The band's progressive side coming to the fore."

"Mellotron Scratch" – Steven remarked, "The most chilled-out track on the record. Lots of overlapping harmonies, and different three-part vocal lines simultaneously weaving in and out of each other. I really went to town with that side of my musical personality."

"Open Car" – Steven stated, "'Open Car' had been one everyone was thinking was going to be a B-side. I substituted that in the mastering. I was listening to it, and I was thinking 'this is such a great track, it's come out so well' and 'So Called Friend', all the way through writing we always thought that's a great track and the final mix didn't quite gel for me. We also did it with 'Glass Arm' and 'Half-Light' as well, although the changes were made a week before the mastering."

"The Start of Something Beautiful" – Richard continued, "One of my favourites; explores the band's love of unconventional time signatures. It has a groove bass line, a contemporary feel, and it washes into a beautiful textual finish line. Classic Porcupine Tree." 'The Start of Something Beautiful' was another song which originated from an idea Gavin had while experimenting, that he titled '9 To 5'. During the writing sessions at Gavin's studio, he played it to Steven, who liked it and started jamming along on bass guitar, and so the foundations of the song were formed.

"Glass Arm Shattering" – Steven enthused, "The final epic blow-out. Has more of the aspects that people associate with the classic early sound of the band, our spacious, dreamy, almost Floyd-ian textural side. That's obviously a big part of the band's personality."

"So Called Friend" – Richard remarked, "A short, fairly heavy riff-based piece. I really like what's going on in the verses and bridges."

== Track listing ==
The band stated that 15 songs were recorded during the Deadwing sessions. The initial release, for Europe, contained only 9 tracks. All versions contain those initial 9 tracks in the same order. For the later U.S. release, an additional track was added on, the 2004 re-recorded version of "Shesmovedon", which was originally released on their 2000 Lightbulb Sun, bringing the total to 10.

The album was also released as a DVD-Audio disc on 10 May 2005 by DTS Entertainment. The disc contains 5.1-channel surround versions of all the tracks from the US CD ("Shesmovedon (2004)" was included as an unlisted extra track.) plus three bonus tracks: "Revenant", "Mother and Child Divided" and "Half-Light", bringing the total to 13 songs.

One more song, "So Called Friend", was released on the "Lazarus" single, bringing it up to 14 songs. There is another song titled "Christenings": while it was never released as a Porcupine Tree song, it was eventually released on Steven Wilson's side project, Blackfield's 2007 album Blackfield II. An instrumental demo called "Collecting Space" made in 2003 during writing sessions for Deadwing, but never recorded by the band. A proper version of this piece was released on the limited edition of Wilson's first solo album Insurgentes as a bonus track. Another possible song from this time is "Godfearing", which was later released on the web and of which Wilson doesn't recall the exact recording period, but it was either during Deadwing or In Absentia.

The album was released in Japan on 24 March 2006, featuring a bonus compilation disc of studio and live songs dating back to Stupid Dream.

Original European edition
| No. | Title | Music | Length |
|---|---|---|---|
| 1. | "Deadwing" | Wilson | 9:46 |
| 2. | "Shallow" | Wilson | 4:17 |
| 3. | "Lazarus" | Wilson | 4:18 |
| 4. | "Halo" | Barbieri, Edwin, Harrison, Wilson | 4:38 |
| 5. | "Arriving Somewhere but Not Here" | Wilson | 12:02 |
| 6. | "Mellotron Scratch" | Wilson | 6:57 |
| 7. | "Open Car" | Wilson | 3:46 |
| 8. | "Start of Something Beautiful" | Harrison, Wilson | 7:39 |
| 9. | "Glass Arm Shattering" | Barbieri, Edwin, Harrison, Wilson | 6:17 |

American edition
| No. | Title | Music | Length |
|---|---|---|---|
| 10. | "Shesmovedon (2004)" | Wilson | 4:59 |

DVD-A edition
| No. | Title | Music | Length |
|---|---|---|---|
| 10. | "Revenant" | Barbieri | 3:04 |
| 11. | "Mother & Child Divided" | Harrison, Wilson | 6:20 |
| 12. | "Half-Light" | Wilson | 6:20 |
| 13. | "Shesmovedon (2004)" (unlisted easter egg track) | Wilson | 4:59 |

LP edition
| No. | Title | Music | Length |
|---|---|---|---|
| 10. | "So Called Friend" | Barbieri, Edwin, Harrison, Wilson | 4:49 |
| 11. | "Half-Light" | Wilson | 6:20 |

All tracks are written by Steven Wilson, except where noted.

2023 Deluxe edition - B-sides
| No. | Title | Writer(s) | Length |
|---|---|---|---|
| 1. | "Revenant" | Barbieri | 3:05 |
| 2. | "So Called Friend" | | 4:49 |
| 3. | "Shesmovedon (2004)" | | 4:55 |
| 4. | "Mother And Child Divided" | Harrison, Wilson | 5:00 |
| 5. | "Half-Light" | | 6:38 |
| Total length: | | | 24:27 |

2023 Deluxe edition - Demos
| No. | Title | Writer(s) | Length |
|---|---|---|---|
| 1. | "Arriving Somewhere But Not Here" (demo) | | 13:03 |
| 2. | "Godfearing" (demo) | | 4:57 |
| 3. | "Lazarus" (demo) | | 4:10 |
| 4. | "Open Car" (demo) | | 5:08 |
| 5. | "Vapour Trail" (demo) | | 3:53 |
| 6. | "Shallow" (demo) | | 4:15 |
| 7. | "Deadwing" (demo) | | 10:35 |
| 8. | "Mother And Child Divided" (demo) | Harrison, Wilson | 5:02 |
| 9. | "Instrumental Demo 1" | Barbieri, Edwin, Harrison, Wilson | 5:19 |
| 10. | "Halo" (demo) | Barbieri, Edwin, Harrison, Wilson | 4:50 |
| 11. | "Instrumental Demo 2" | Barbieri, Edwin, Harrison, Wilson | 5:23 |
| 12. | "So Called Friend" (demo) | Barbieri, Edwin, Harrison, Wilson | 5:01 |
| 13. | "Glass Arm Jam" | Barbieri, Edwin, Harrison, Wilson | 4:19 |
| Total length: | | | 75:55 |

== Awards ==
Deadwing won the "Best Made-For-Surround Title" award for the 2005 Surround Music Awards, and was voted the number 2 album of 2005 in Sound & Vision, which is the most widely distributed US magazine in the field of home electronics and entertainment. In addition to this, the album won the "Album of the Year" award for the 2005 Classic Rock magazine awards. The album was named as one of Classic Rock's 10 essential progressive rock albums of the decade.

== Chart positions ==
| Chart | Peak Position |
|---|---|
| Billboard 200 | 132 |
| France | 100 |
| Germany | 52 |
| Greece | 19 |
| Netherlands | 56 |
| Poland | 11 |
| Sweden | 26 |
| Top Heatseekers | 4 |
| Top Internet Albums | 6 |
| United Kingdom | 97 |

Singles

| Song | Chart | Position |
|---|---|---|
| "Shallow" | Mainstream Rock Tracks | 26 |

== Personnel ==
Porcupine Tree

- Steven Wilson - vocals, guitars, piano, keyboards, hammered dulcimer, bass guitar on 1,3,5 (middle section), 7
- Richard Barbieri - keyboards and synthesizers
- Colin Edwin - bass guitar
- Gavin Harrison - drums and percussion

Guest musicians

- Mikael Åkerfeldt - backing vocals on tracks 1, 3, 5 & 10; Second guitar solo on 5
- Adrian Belew - solo guitar on 1, 4

Production

- Produced By Steven Wilson, Richard Barbieri & Gavin Harrison
- Recorded & Engineered By Paul Northfield & George Schilling
- Mixed By Steven Wilson
- Mastered By Andy VanDette
- 5.1 Producer: Jeff Levison
- 5.1 Mixed By: Elliot Scheiner
- 5.1 Mastered By Darsy Proper at Sony Studios
