= It Leads to This =

2024 studio album by the Pineapple Thief

Studio album by The Pineapple Thief
- Released: 9 February 2024
- Recorded: 2021–2023
- Studios: Bourne Place (London); Soord Studios (Yeovil)
- Length: 40:45
- Label: Kscope

The Pineapple Thief chronology
Give It Back (2022)	It Leads to This (2024)	Far and Wide (2026)

It Leads to This is the fifteenth studio album by British progressive rock band The Pineapple Thief. It was released on 9 February 2024 through Kscope.

== Background ==
Recorded between London and Yeovil, The Pineapple Thief worked on the record "for nearly three years" prior to its announcement on 29 November 2023. Frontman Bruce Soord thought it was "the most intense time" he remembers within the band. He felt "being pushed well beyond" his limits. It Leads to This continued his "desire to observe" and "(try to) make sense of life".

== Critical reception ==
Professional ratings
Review scores
Source	Rating
Blabbermouth.net	8.5/10
Laut.de	4/5 stars
Rock Hard	8.0/10

It Leads to This received positive reviews from critics. Dom Lawson of Blabbermouth.net thought that the band once again "redefined their artful, prog-tinged alt-rock as something bigger", however "more expansive and more explosive" than before. It observes "the frustrations and existential turbulence" of the modern day humankind "but without opting to pompously spell things out".

Dennis Rieger at Laut.de opined that The Pineapple Thief delivered their best album since Your Wilderness (2016), an "excellently recorded and produced album" that sees the members up their scale in terms of instrumentals and "hardness". However, Rieger wished the band allowed more "chaos" into their music.

== Track listing ==
All lyrics are written by Bruce Soord; all music is composed by Gavin Harrison and Bruce Soord.

It Leads to This track listing
No.	Title	Length
1.	"Put It Right"	5:30
2.	"Rubicon"	4:37
3.	"It Leads to This"	4:43
4.	"The Frost"	5:40
5.	"All That's Left"	4:25
6.	"Now It's Yours"	5:59
7.	"Every Trace of Us"	4:30
8.	"To Forget"	5:21
Total length:		40:45

== Personnel ==
The Pineapple Thief

- Bruce Soord – vocals, guitars, production, mixing
- Steve Kitch – keyboards, mastering
- Jon Sykes – bass, backing vocals
- Gavin Harrison – drums, percussion, mixing
- Beren Matthews – additional guitar, backing vocals

Artwork

- Beech – design

== Charts ==
Chart performance for It Leads to This
Chart (2024)	Peak position
Dutch Albums (Album Top 100)	83
German Albums (Offizielle Top 100)	20
Scottish Albums (Official Charts)	7
Swiss Albums (Schweizer Hitparade)	14
UK Albums (Official Charts)	93
UK Independent Albums (Official Charts)	2
