= All the Wars =

All The Wars

Studio album by The Pineapple Thief
- Released: 3 September 2012
- Genre: Progressive rock, alternative rock
- Length: 45:08
- Label: Kscope
- Producer: Bruce Soord

The Pineapple Thief chronology
| Someone Here Is Missing (2010) | All The Wars (2012) | Magnolia (2014) |

Professional ratings
Review scores
| Source | Rating |
|---|---|
| Record Collector | 4/5 stars |
| Sputnikmusic | 3.5/5 stars |

All the Wars is a studio album by the British alternative rock band the Pineapple Thief, released in 2012.

== Production ==
A choir and a 22-piece string section appear on the album.

== Critical reception ==
Record Collector wrote that frontman Bruce Soord's songs "aren’t mere entertainments; they’re demanding pieces, both muscular and intricate, concerned with conflicts and dislocation, charting personal battles drawn out on large canvases." The Bristol Post deemed the album "hugely impressive."

== Track listing ==
All tracks are written by Bruce Soord.

| No. | Title | Length |
|---|---|---|
| 1. | "Burning Pieces" | 4:11 |
| 2. | "Warm Seas" | 3:57 |
| 3. | "Last Man Standing" | 5:11 |
| 4. | "All the Wars" | 3:46 |
| 5. | "Build a World" | 3:57 |
| 6. | "Give It Back" | 7:01 |
| 7. | "Someone Pull Me Out" | 4:00 |
| 8. | "One More Step Away" | 3:10 |
| 9. | "Reaching Out" | 9:49 |
| Total length: | | 45:08 |

Bonus tracks (2018 reissue)
| No. | Title | Length |
|---|---|---|
| 10. | "You Don't Look So Innocent" | 3:55 |
| 11. | "What Are You Saying?" | 4:28 |
| 12. | "Warm Seas (Acoustic)" | 4:11 |
| 13. | "All the Wars (Acoustic)" | 3:49 |
| 14. | "Last Man Standing (Acoustic)" | 4:32 |
| 15. | "Someone Pull Me Out (Acoustic)" | 4:05 |
| 16. | "Burning Pieces (Acoustic)" | 3:12 |
| 17. | "Reaching Out (Acoustic)" | 4:50 |
| Total length: | | 33:02 |

More Wars (Bonus Acoustic Disc)
| No. | Title | Length |
|---|---|---|
| 1. | "Warm Seas" | 4:11 |
| 2. | "All the Wars" | 3:49 |
| 3. | "Last Man Standing" | 4:32 |
| 4. | "Every Last Moment" | 2:35 |
| 5. | "One More Step Away" | 3:01 |
| 6. | "Someone Pull Me Out" | 4:05 |
| 7. | "Burning Pieces" | 3:12 |
| 8. | "Reaching Out" | 4:50 |
| 9. | "Light Up Your Eyes" | 4:07 |
| Total length: | | 34:22 |

== Personnel ==
- Bruce Soord: vocals, guitar, composer
- Steve Kitch: keyboards, mixing
- Jon Sykes: bass guitar, vocals
- Keith Harrison: drums, vocals

== Production ==
- Arranged by The Pineapple Thief
- Written by Bruce Soord
- Recorded by Mark Bowyer
- Mixed (& Additional Production) by Mark Bowyer and Steve Kitch
