= Godsticks =

British progressive rock band

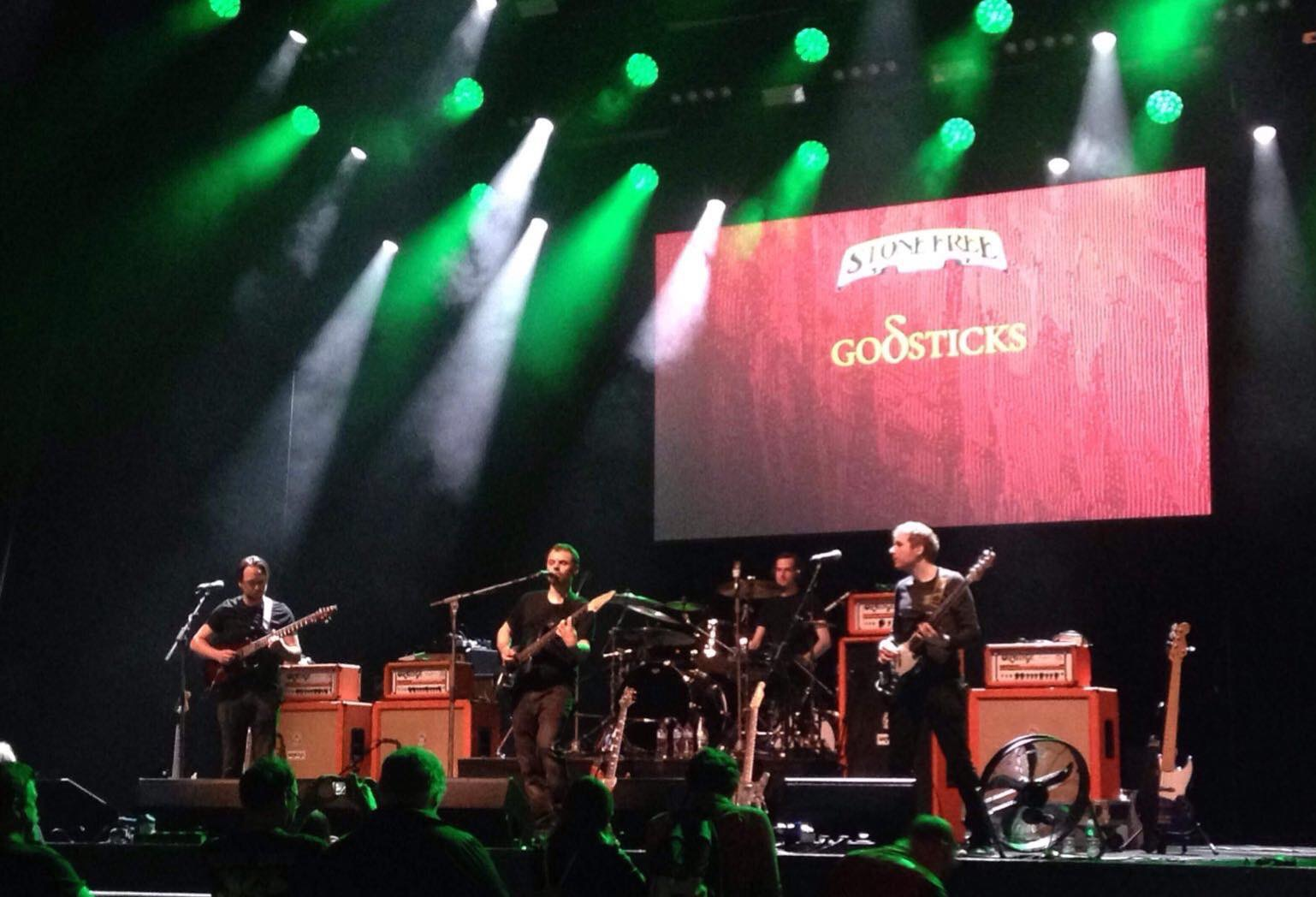
- Godsticks live at Stone Free Festival London, 17 June 2018

Background information
- Origin: Wales
- Genres: Progressive rock, progressive metal
- Years active: 2008–present
- Label: Kscope
- Members: Darran Charles; Francis George; Gavin Bushell; Tom Price
- Past members: Jason Marsh; Steve Roberts; Dan Nelson
- Website: https://www.godsticks.co.uk

Godsticks is a British progressive rock/progressive metal band based in Newport, Wales. The band was formed in 2006 and has released five studio albums and one self-titled EP. Godsticks consists of vocalist and guitarist Darran Charles, bassist Francis George, guitarist Gavin Bushell, and drummer Tom Price.

== History ==
=== 2009 - 2012 ===
The original line-up was founding member Darran Charles, bassist Jason Marsh and drummer Steve Roberts. Roberts was hired to play on the debut recording and subsequently joined the band. Marsh left the band in 2009.

Godsticks released their self-titled debut EP in 2009.

In July 2010, Godsticks released a full-length debut album, Spiral Vendetta. A new bassist, Dan Nelson, joined the band after being discovered on YouTube.

=== 2012 - 2013 ===
A worldwide distribution deal was secured on the strength of Spiral Vendetta, and the band completed tours and festivals, supporting such acts as The Pineapple Thief. In March 2012, Godsticks were the supporting act on a 5-date UK tour with the Aristocrats. The band recorded their next album, The Envisage Conundrum.

=== 2013 - 2014 ===
The Envisage Conundrum was released in 2013. Kerrang Magazine commented on " flashes of innovation and virtuoso class". In 2013, Godsticks supported The Mike Keneally Band on a 13-date tour of Europe and co-headlined a UK tour with Knifeworld, followed by a three-week European tour in 2014 supporting The Aristocrats.

=== 2014 - 2017 ===
In 2014, the band recorded their third album, Emergence, at Monnow Valley Studio. Emergence was released in September 2015 and was well reviewed. The album was produced by James Loughrey (known for his work with acts such as Skindred, Manic Street Preachers and Def Leppard). The band's music had evolved to a heavier progressive metal style. Total Guitar Magazine described it as “an album of technically astounding prog-metal".

Emergence was the last album to feature the three-piece line-up that had existed since 2010. In September 2015, Roberts left the band and guitarist Gavin Bushell joined, along with drummer Tom Price.

The new four-piece line-up started performing in late 2015 in support slots for bands such as Textures, Dorje and Aisles. In 2017, they supported The Pineapple Thief on both European legs of their Your Wilderness Tour, and performed at the HRH Prog and Planet RockStock festivals in Wales.

=== 2017 - 2019 ===
The band was signed by Kscope Records. In October 2017 they released one of their most successful albums, Faced With Rage. They played headline shows across the UK in 2018; performed at the Stone Free festival at The O2 in London and the Prog'Sud Festival in Marseille, France; and headlined the first Fusion Festival in Stourport.

=== 2019 - present ===
The band's fifth studio album, Inescapable, was released on 7 February 2020. A headline UK tour was scheduled to take place in April 2020, with appearances at international festivals, but these dates were postponed because of the COVID-19 pandemic. The band returned in 2021.

Godsticks released their sixth studio album, This is What a Winner Looks Like, in 2023.

== Discography ==
- Godsticks (2009, EP)
- Spiral Vendetta (2010)
- The Envisage Conundrum (2013)
- Emergence (2015)
- Faced with Rage (2017)
- Inescapable (2020)
- This Is What a Winner Looks Like (2023)
