= Inescapable =

Inescapable may refer to:

- Inescapable (film), 2012
- Inescapable, 2003 Lesbian erotic film by Helen Lesnick
- "Inescapable" (song), Jessica Mauboy 2011
- "Inescapable", single by Cranes (band), 1990
- Inescapable (Agents of S.H.I.E.L.D.), an episode of Agents of S.H.I.E.L.D.
- Inescapable, (Album) by Godsticks, 2020
- Inescapable: No Rules No Rescue Videogame PS5, PS4, Nintendo Switch, Steam and Xbox One 2023
