= Drop (Gavin Harrison & 05Ric album) =

Studio album by Gavin Harrison & 05Ric
- Released: 2007
- Genre: Progressive rock, Jazz fusion
- Length: 44:06
- Label: Burning Shed / Kscope
- Producer: Gavin Harrison & 05Ric (GH05)

Gavin Harrison & 05Ric chronology
Drop (2007)	Circles (2009)

Alternative cover
- Reissue artwork by Carl Glover

Professional ratings
Review scores
Source	Rating
Wusik	

Drop is a collaborative album by Porcupine Tree drummer Gavin Harrison and multi-instrumentalist, vocalist and extended-range bass player 05Ric. It was released on the Burning Shed record label in 2007.

== Reception ==
The review by Johan Vaxelaire in Wusik Magazine states: "The qualities present here are the excellent instrument playing of Gavin Harrison on drums; the incredible vocal harmonies, sense, and inventiveness and originality of 05ric’s bass playing. The close relationship between technique and emotion makes this a disk showcasing technical skill and yet so pleasant to listen to from beginning to end."

== Track listing ==
1. "Unsettled" – 5:45
2. "Sailing" – 4:45
3. "Life" – 4:23
4. "Sometime" – 6:55
5. "For Lack Of" – 5:10
6. "Clock" – 4:10
7. "Okay" – 4:05
8. "Where Are You Going?" – 4:40
9. "Centered" – 5:33

All songs written by Gavin Harrison & 05Ric

== Personnel ==
- Gavin Harrison – drums, tapped guitar
- 05Ric – extended-range bass, vocals
- Robert Fripp – guitar on "Sailing"
- Dave Stewart – keyboards on "Centered"
- Gary Sanctuary – keyboards on "Where Are You Going?"
