= What We Have Sown =

Studio album by The Pineapple Thief
- Released: 24 October 2007
- Recorded: The Dining Rooms, Yeovil; August 2007
- Genre: Progressive rock
- Length: 56:42
- Label: Cyclops Records
- Producer: Bruce Soord

The Pineapple Thief chronology
Little Man (2006)	What We Have Sown (2007)	Tightly Unwound (2008)

Professional ratings
Review scores
Source	Rating
DPRP	9+/10
Prog-Nose	8.5/10

What We Have Sown (2007) is the sixth album by The Pineapple Thief, recorded over the span of eight weeks during the development of Tightly Unwound (compare with 8 Days and 8 Days Later). The record was released through Cyclops Records as a "thank you" to the label for supporting the band before their departure for Kscope.

Most of the album's songs are holdovers from earlier albums; "All You Need to Know" was written for 10 Stories Down, and "Well, I Think That's What You Said?" (formerly titled "Blood on Your Hands") and "Take Me with You" are outtakes from Little Man.

== Track listing ==
No.	Title	Length
1.	"All You Need to Know"	4:19
2.	"Well, I Think That's What You Said?"	5:20
3.	"Take Me with You"	5:07
4.	"West Winds"	8:52
5.	"Deep Blue World"	6:08
6.	"What Have We Sown?"	27:33
