= Way Out of Here =

- Cover of the Roadrunner Records promo single.

Promotional single by Porcupine Tree

from the album Fear of a Blank Planet
- Released: 2007
- Recorded: October–December 2006
- Genre: Progressive rock; progressive metal
- Length: 7:37 (album version); 4:18 (edit)
- Songwriter(s): Steven Wilson; Colin Edwin; Richard Barbieri; Gavin Harrison

Porcupine Tree singles chronology
"Fear of a Blank Planet" (2007)	"Way Out of Here" (2007)	"Time Flies" (2009)

"Way Out of Here" is a song by British progressive rock band Porcupine Tree, and the fifth track from their ninth studio album, Fear of a Blank Planet. A promo two-track single was released by Roadrunner Records intended for radio airplay. The record consists of the album version of the song and a radio edit, and is housed in a cardboard sleeve with unique artwork.

"Way Out of Here" contains soundscapes provided by King Crimson's guitarist, Robert Fripp. It was written in order to replace the song "Cheating the Polygraph," which was intended to be on the album. However, the band decided it did not fit well the concept. "Cheating the Polygraph" was later included on the Nil Recurring EP.

Porcupine Tree – Way out of Here excerpt
An excerpt from "Way out of here"

== Track listing ==
1. Way Out of Here (edit) – 4:18
2. Way Out of Here (album version) – 7:37

== Personnel (song) ==
- Steven Wilson – vocals, guitar
- Richard Barbieri – keyboards
- Colin Edwin – bass
- Gavin Harrison – drums
- Robert Fripp – soundscapes

== Music video ==
An edited version of the music video for the song was released via myspace. It was directed by long-time collaborator, artist Lasse Hoile. The video was shot in Aarhus, Silkeborg, and Vrads, Denmark.

The video is dedicated to Arielle Daniel, a girl who was killed by a train on 12 November 2005, at the age of seventeen, together with a friend of hers, Heather Bates, who was fourteen years old. Daniel was a Porcupine Tree fan who founded the band's MySpace Group. According to news reports, the girls stepped into the path of the train together in an apparent suicide. Both were from Oak Creek, Wisconsin. During a show at Milwaukee, Wisconsin, on 2 June 2007, her family were present among the audience, so Steven Wilson paid tribute to them, saying "This is for Arielle" just before the band played "Blackest Eyes" which was her favourite song. That night, "Way Out of Here" was performed without showing the video on the screen.
