= Nil Recurring =

EP by Porcupine Tree
- Released: 17 September 2007
- Genres: Progressive rock, progressive metal
- Length: 28:44
- Labels: Transmission; WHD (JPN); Peaceville
- Producer: Porcupine Tree

Porcupine Tree chronology
Rockpalast (2006)	Nil Recurring (2007)	We Lost the Skyline (2008)

Alternative cover

Professional ratings
Review scores
Source	Rating
AllMusic	4/5 stars
Aquarian Weekly	(A+)
Epinions.com	4/5 stars
Metal Storm	(8.5/10)
PopMatters	(7/10)
ReGen	3.5/5 stars

Nil Recurring (also Transmission 5.1) is an EP by British progressive rock band Porcupine Tree, released on 17 September 2007 through the band's online store. The standard version of the mini-album is composed of four tracks written during the Fear of a Blank Planet recording sessions and was completed over the summer of 2007. The EP's title, which stems from the opening instrumental track on the EP, was actually derived from an unreleased demo written during the Fear of a Blank Planet recording sessions, called "Always Recurring". Although the band never formally released the song, lyrical and melodic elements of the track were reused in the closing piece of the EP, "What Happens Now?".

Nil Recurring entered the UK Top 30 Independent Label Albums Chart at number eight.

== Writing and recording ==
The band met in London in July 2006 to work on new material to follow up Deadwing. At the time, "My Ashes" and "Normal" had already been written by Wilson; he later reworked the latter song, transforming it into "Sentimental". The band sessions produced "Fear of a Blank Planet", "Anesthetize", "Cheating the Polygraph", and "Sleep Together", along with material that would not fit the album they were forming. Thus, when the band toured later in the year to polish songwriting and preview the upcoming record, it was played in the work-in-progress running order: the same as the final album sequence, but with "Cheating the Polygraph" in the fifth track placement. Once the tour ended, the band decided none of the extra songs nor "Cheating the Polygraph" were up to the standards of the record, as they weren't properly developed, and there was a policy not to make the album over fifty minutes long. The band wrote "Way Out of Here" to bridge "Sentimental" and "Sleep Together"; after Fear of a Blank Planet was released, the four remaining tracks were mixed between June and August 2007 to make the Nil Recurring EP.

== Release ==
The first press of the album was issued on Porcupine Tree's own label, Transmission, and was limited to 5,000 copies in a fold-out digipak. It was originally decided to sell 3,000 copies through the band's online store and sell the remaining 2,000 at shows on the forthcoming tour, but the initial run of pre-orders through the online store were sold out in a period of 24 hours, so the band quickly put out more copies, whether for purchase or download in MP3/FLAC formats at a very cheap cost; the downloadable version includes exclusive printable artwork. Peaceville Records further promoted the release by constructing a Nil Recurring minisite, and more specifically in conjunction with Porcupine Tree, by creating and releasing a video for the song "Normal", which contains an edited, radio-friendly version of the song. A Japanese edition was released through WHD in late October 2007 and includes the radio edit of "Fear of a Blank Planet" as a bonus track.

== Title and concept ==
Porcupine Tree's frontman, Steven Wilson, explained the meaning of the EP's title and commented about its relationship with the concept of Fear of a Blank Planet:

"I just thought it was an interesting idea I had. I had this instrumental, and I didn't have a title, so I called it "Nil Recurring". It's always quite hard to name instrumentals, because obviously there's no subject matter to relate it to. I just thought the idea was quite funny. I kind of like absurd titles. I kind of have a history of having these titles that make no sense, like Up the Downstair. I mean, Nil Recurring is another paradox-like statement. You cannot have the number nil recurring. So it's just a bit of fun really. And of course, it seemed to fit in with the lyrical concept of some of the other pieces that featured on Fear of a Blank Planet. It was that idea of blankness, of not being there, or negativity that helped gave that piece - and the EP - its title".

== Song details ==
- The track "Nil Recurring" is an instrumental piece and features King Crimson guitarist Robert Fripp on lead guitar. Furthermore, drummer Gavin Harrison plays tap guitar on this track.
- The chorus in "Normal" is musically very similar to the chorus in "Sentimental", since the latter is a further development of the former. The lyrics of both songs contain a response to each other: while the last verse on "Normal" says "Wish I was old and a little sentimental", the first verse on "Sentimental" speaks "I never wanna be old, and I don't want dependence". The song also has a lyrical reference to the song "Anesthetize" from Fear of a Blank Planet in the phrase "I do a good impression of myself". According to Wilson's statement in the live performance We Lost the Skyline, the song was written in Tel-Aviv.
- The song "Cheating the Polygraph" debuted on the late 2006 Fear of a Blank Planet preview tour, although its title was not revealed at the time. It was later dropped out of the track list for the album, so the band wrote "Way Out of Here" to fill the gap. On the LP version of Fear of a Blank Planet, "Cheating the Polygraph" ends the first side, therefore placed between "My Ashes" and "Anesthetize". The rest of Nil Recurring is placed on the fourth side. In 2015, it also became the title track of Gavin Harrison's solo album featuring Porcupine Tree songs rearranged (by bass player Laurence Cottle) in a big band jazz setting.
- Ben Coleman contributes electric violin to "What Happens Now?", having previously worked with Wilson as part of No-Man. During live performances, Coleman's parts are played on the guitar by touring guitarist John Wesley. "What Happens Now?" includes a riff featured in "Anesthetize", lyrical references to "My Ashes", and additionally, elements of an unreleased song titled "Always Recurring" - which was pegged for "Nil Recurring" but dropped out later on - were used in the making of the song. Its title is derived from an unpublished (but sung) bridge lyric in "Way Out of Here": "I will be found with a bomb in my bag, thinking 'what happens now?'."

== Promotion ==
Peaceville Records set a Nil Recurring minisite related to the issue of the EP, including full audio streamings for each track. The video for "Normal" was initially intended to be posted on 15 February 2008, but its release date was moved forward to 9 February 2008.

== Track listing ==
In addition to the standard version, the EP is also available in 5.1 Surround Sound on the DVDA version of Fear of a Blank Planet.

No.	Title	Writer(s)	Length
1.	"Nil Recurring"	Wilson, Barbieri, Edwin, Harrison	6:08
2.	"Normal"	Wilson	7:07
3.	"Cheating the Polygraph"	Wilson, Harrison	7:06
4.	"What Happens Now?"	Wilson, Barbieri, Edwin, Harrison	8:23

== Personnel ==
- Steven Wilson – vocals, guitars, piano, keyboards
- Richard Barbieri – keyboards and synthesizers
- Colin Edwin – bass guitars
- Gavin Harrison – drums, percussion, tapped guitar on "Nil Recurring"

=== Guests ===
- Robert Fripp – lead guitar on "Nil Recurring"
- Ben Coleman – electric violin on "What Happens Now?"

== Chart performance ==
Chart	Entry
UK Indie Chart	8
Finland	5
France	114
Germany	100

== Release history ==
Country	Date	Label
United Kingdom	17 September 2007	Transmission
Japan	30 October 2007	WHD
Europe	18 February 2008	Peaceville
United States	19 February 2008	Peaceville
Germany	22 February 2008	Peaceville
