= Circles (Gavin Harrison & 05Ric album) =

Studio album by Gavin Harrison & 05Ric
- Released: 31 March 2009
- Genres: Progressive rock, jazz fusion, math rock
- Length: 40:20
- Label: Burning Shed / Kscope
- Producer: Gavin Harrison and 05Ric (GH05)

Gavin Harrison & 05Ric chronology
Drop (2007)	Circles (2009)	The Man Who Sold Himself (2012)

Circles is the second collaborative album by Porcupine Tree drummer Gavin Harrison and multi-instrumentalist, vocalist and extended-range bass player 05Ric. It was released on the Burning Shed record label in 2009.

== Reception ==
A review in the December 2009 issue of Drummer Magazine states "Although the music itself is complex, it feels great and retains a sense of space and atmosphere, while Gavin and Ric show themselves to be two of the most inventive musicians around, still retaining the highest level of musicality."

== Track listing ==
1. "Circles" – 4:29
2. "Source" – 5:49
3. "Last Call" – 3:32
4. "Crisis" – 3:42
5. "Faith" – 5:03
6. "Scar" – 4:00
7. "Break" – 4:55
8. "Beyond The 'A'" – 3:56
9. "Eye" – 3:33
10. "Goodbye" – 3:21

All songs written by Gavin Harrison & 05Ric

== Personnel ==
- Gavin Harrison – drums, guitar & bass
- 05Ric – extended-range bass & vocals
