= Magnolia (The Pineapple Thief album) =

2014 studio album by the Pineapple Thief

Studio album by The Pineapple Thief
- Released: 16 September 2014
- Genre: Progressive rock, alternative rock
- Length: 46:07
- Label: Kscope
- Producer: Dan Osborne

The Pineapple Thief chronology
All the Wars (2012)	Magnolia (2014)	Your Wilderness (2016)

Professional ratings
Review scores
Source	Rating
AllMusic	3.5/5 stars
SputnikMusic	2.6/5 stars

Magnolia is the tenth studio album by British alternative rock band The Pineapple Thief.

== Track listing ==
All tracks are written by Bruce Soord

No.	Title	Length
1.	"Simple as That"	4:04
2.	"Alone at Sea"	5:20
3.	"Don't Tell Me"	3:33
4.	"Magnolia"	3:47
5.	"Seasons Past"	4:13
6.	"Coming Home"	3:07
7.	"The One You Left to Die"	4:21
8.	"Breathe"	2:51
9.	"From Me"	2:34
10.	"Sense of Fear"	4:30
11.	"A Loneliness"	3:18
12.	"Bond"	4:29
Total length:		46:07

Bonus Acoustic Disc
No.	Title	Length
1.	"The Fins Fan Me"	3:57
2.	"The One You Left to Die"	4:18
3.	"Seasons Past"	4:18
4.	"Don't Tell Me"	2:58
5.	"Magnolia"	3:48
6.	"Steal This Life"	4:06
Total length:		23:25

== Personnel ==
Musicians

- Steve Kitch: Fender Rhodes, keyboards, Mellotron, piano
- Dan Osborne: Drums, percussion, backing vocals
- Bruce Soord: Vocals, guitar, keyboards, percussion
- Jon Sykes: Bass, backing vocals
- Darran Charles: Guitar
- Natalia Bonner: Violin
- Alison Dods: Violin
- Jonathan Evans-Jones: Violin
- Richard George: Violin
- Patrick Kiernan: Violin
- Steve Morris: Violin
- Everton Nelson: Violin
- Lucy Wilkins: Violin
- Reiad Chibah: Viola
- Rachel Robson: Viola
- Bruce White: Viola
- Ian Burdge: Cello
- Chris Worsey: Cello
- Mary Scully: Double bass
- Andrew Skeet: String arrangements, conductor

Production

- Arranged by The Pineapple Thief
- Produced by Dan Osborne
- Additional Production by Steve Cole
- Engineered by Adam Noble and Marco Pasquariello
