= Sleep together =

Sleep together may refer to:

- Sexual intercourse
- "Sleep Together", a song by Garbage from Version 2.0, 1998
- "Sleep Together", a song by Porcupine Tree from Fear of a Blank Planet, 2007
