= Someone Here Is Missing =

2010 studio album by the Pineapple Thief

Studio album by The Pineapple Thief
- Released: 1 June 2010
- Genre: Progressive rock
- Length: 45:15
- Label: Kscope
- Producer: Bruce Soord

The Pineapple Thief chronology
Tightly Unwound (2008)	Someone Here Is Missing (2010)	All the Wars (2012)

Professional ratings
Review scores
Source	Rating
AllMusic	2.5/5 stars
Rock Sound	8/10 stars

Someone Here Is Missing is the eighth studio album by The Pineapple Thief, featuring cover art by Storm Thorgerson.

== Track listing ==
All songs written by Bruce Soord.

No.	Title	Length
1.	"Nothing at Best"	4:08
2.	"Wake Up the Dead"	4:23
3.	"The State We're In"	3:18
4.	"Preparation for Meltdown"	7:27
5.	"Barely Breathing"	3:44
6.	"Show a Little Love"	3:58
7.	"Someone Here Is Missing"	3:52
8.	"3000 Days"	6:09
9.	"So We Row"	8:16

== Personnel ==
- Bruce Soord: vocals, acoustic & electric guitars, keyboards, programming
- Steve Kitch: keyboards, synthesizers
- Jon Sykes: acoustic & electric bass, vocals
- Keith Harrison: drums, percussion, vocals

== Production ==
- Arranged by The Pineapple Thief
- Produced & engineered by Bruce Soord
- Mixed by Mark Bowyer & Steve Kitch
- Mastered by Dave Turner
- Artwork by designer Storm Thorgerson
