= A Sense of Loss =

A Sense of Loss may refer to:

- A Sense of Loss (album), 2009, by Nosound
- A Sense of Loss (film), 1972 documentary film by Marcel Ophüls
