= Versions of the Truth =

2020 studio album by the Pineapple Thief

Studio album by The Pineapple Thief
- Released: 4 September 2020
- Recorded: October 2018 – May 2020 at Bourne Place, London and Soord Studios, Yeovil
- Genre: Alternative rock, progressive rock
- Length: 44:56
- Label: Kscope

The Pineapple Thief chronology
Dissolution (2018)	Versions of the Truth (2020)	Give It Back (2022)

Professional ratings
Review scores
Source	Rating
AllMusic	4/5 stars
PopMatters	8/10 stars

Versions of the Truth is the thirteenth studio album by British progressive rock band The Pineapple Thief, released on 4 September 2020 through Kscope. It is the third album to include Gavin Harrison on drums.

== Track listing ==
All tracks are written by Bruce Soord and Gavin Harrison.

No.	Title	Length
1.	"Versions of the Truth"	5:40
2.	"Break It All"	4:22
3.	"Demons"	4:34
4.	"Driving Like Maniacs"	3:29
5.	"Leave Me Be"	4:14
6.	"Too Many Voices"	3:17
7.	"Our Mire"	7:27
8.	"Out of Line"	4:00
9.	"Stop Making Sense"	3:20
10.	"The Game"	4:45
Total length:		44:56

=== Alternate album ===
All tracks are written by Bruce Soord and Gavin Harrison.

No.	Title	Length
1.	"The Swell"	4:16
2.	"Break It All (Alt.)"	4:38
3.	"Demons (Alt.)"	4:43
4.	"Driving Like Maniacs (Alt.)"	3:31
5.	"Leave Me Be (Alt.)"	4:11
6.	"Our Mire (Alt.)"	6:56
7.	"Too Many Voices (Alt.)"	3:38
8.	"Versions Of The Truth (Alt.)"	5:49
Total length:		37:41

== Charts ==
Chart (2020)	Peak Position
French Albums (SNEP)	196
German Albums (Offizielle Top 100)	22
Scottish Albums (OCC)	9
Swiss Albums (Schweizer Hitparade)	30
UK Albums (OCC)	46
UK Album Downloads (OCC)	44
UK Independent Albums (OCC)	2
UK Rock & Metal Albums (OCC)	2
