= Dissolution (The Pineapple Thief album) =

2018 studio album by the Pineapple Thief

Studio album by The Pineapple Thief
- Released: 31 August 2018
- Recorded: December 2017 – May 2018
- Studio: Soord Studios (Yeovil, South Somerset, England); Bourne Place (Hertfordshire, England)
- Genre: Alternative rock; progressive rock
- Length: 43:27
- Label: Kscope
- Producer: The Pineapple Thief

The Pineapple Thief chronology
Your Wilderness (2016)	Dissolution (2018)	Versions of the Truth (2020)

Professional ratings
Review scores
Source	Rating
AllMusic	4/5 stars
PopMatters	7/10 stars
Sputnikmusic	3.8 stars on a 5 point scale

Dissolution (stylised as di§olution) is the twelfth studio album by British progressive rock band the Pineapple Thief, released on 31 August 2018, through Kscope. It's the second album to include Gavin Harrison on drums and his first album as an official member of the band.

== Track listing ==
All lyrics are written by Bruce Soord; all music is composed by Bruce Soord and Gavin Harrison, except where noted.

No.	Title	Music	Length
1.	"Not Naming Any Names"	Soord	2:05
2.	"Try as I Might"		4:26
3.	"Threatening War"		6:37
4.	"Uncovering Your Tracks"		4:28
5.	"All That You've Got"		3:26
6.	"Far Below"		4:36
7.	"Pillar of Salt"	Soord	1:25
8.	"White Mist"		11:05
9.	"Shed a Light"		5:19
Total length:			43:27

Deluxe Edition bonus CD
No.	Title	Music	Length
1.	"Try as I Might" (re-imagined acoustic)		5:21
2.	"Threatening War" (re-imagined acoustic)		3:51
3.	"Far Below" (re-imagined acoustic)		4:17
4.	"Not Naming Any Names" (re-imagined acoustic)		2:04
5.	"White Mist" (re-imagined acoustic)		6:19
6.	"Shed a Light" (re-imagined acoustic)		4:28
7.	"Am I Better Now?"	Soord	3:16
Total length:			29:36

== Personnel ==
The Pineapple Thief

- Bruce Soord – vocals, guitars
- Jon Sykes – bass, backing vocals
- Steve Kitch – keyboards
- Gavin Harrison – drums, percussion

Additional musicians

- David Torn – additional guitars (track 8)

Production

- The Pineapple Thief – production
- Bruce Soord – recording, mixing
- Gavin Harrison – recording (drums), mixing (drums)
- Steve Kitch – mastering
- Stylorouge – art direction, design
- Rob O'Connor – photography
- James Usill – post-production
- Frederick Jude – executive producer

== Charts ==
Chart (2018)	Peak position
Austrian Albums (Ö3 Austria)	66
Belgian Albums (Ultratop Flanders)	102
Dutch Albums (Album Top 100)	42
German Albums (Offizielle Top 100)	22
Scottish Albums (OCC)	20
Swiss Albums (Schweizer Hitparade)	37
UK Albums (OCC)	36
