= 10 Stories Down =

2005 studio album by the Pineapple Thief

Studio album by The Pineapple Thief
- Released: June 2005
- Recorded: 2004 and 2005
- Genre: Progressive rock
- Length: 59:57
- Label: Cyclops Records
- Producer: Bruce Soord

The Pineapple Thief chronology
Variations on a Dream (2003)	10 Stories Down (2005)	Little Man (2006)

10 Stories Down is the fourth album by The Pineapple Thief, released in June 2005. This album was also remixed and re-mastered by Bruce Soord and Steve Kitsch in 2011, the second in a series of re-mastered reissues from the band’s back catalogue under the Kscope label. The reissue was released via the Kscope online store (and via their Official Online Store) on 20 June 2011.

== Track listing ==
No.	Title	Length
1.	"Prey for Me"	6:39
2.	"Clapham"	4:31
3.	"Wretched Soul"	4:56
4.	"The World I Always Dreamed Of"	6:39
5.	"Start Your Descent"	3:57
6.	"My Own Oblivion"	3:38
7.	"It's Just You and Me"	4:58
8.	"The Answers"	5:28
9.	"From Where You're Standing"	3:59
10.	"I Will Light Up Your Eyes"	7:20
11.	"Who Will Light Up Your Eyes?"	7:52

== 8 Days Later ==
8 Days Later is a bonus disc included with the first 1000 pressings of both 10 Stories Down and 12 Stories Down. Like its predecessor 8 Days, all the tracks were conceived, recorded and mixed in 8 days, and use ambient sounds from in and around the studio

=== Track listing ===
1. "Sunday: Crash"
2. "Monday: Sleep"
3. "Tuesday: Haboob"
4. "Wednesday: The Snail Song"
5. "Thursday: Fifty Four"
6. "Friday: 5 Minutes"
7. "Saturday: Reverse"
8. "Sunday: King Street"
9. "Who Will Be There"^{1}
10. "Wretched Soul"^{1}
11. "I Will Light Up Your Eyes"^{1}

^{1} Only appears on copies of 8 Days Later shipped with 12 Stories Down

== 12 Stories Down ==
A limited edition "preview" version of 10 Stories Down, called 12 Stories Down, was released in November 2004. The album contained unmastered mixes of most of the songs that would appear on 10 Stories Down, as well as a few exclusive to the preview CD, and as such, the track list differs.

=== Track listing ===
1. "Prey for Me"
2. "It's You and Me"
3. "The World I Always Dreamed Of"
4. "Oblivion"
5. "From Where You're Standing"
6. "Slip Away"
7. "Watch the World (Turn Grey)"
8. "Clapham"
9. "Catch the Jumping Fool"
10. "Start Your Descent"
11. "Take Our Hands"
12. "The Answers"
