= Nosound =

Italian rock band

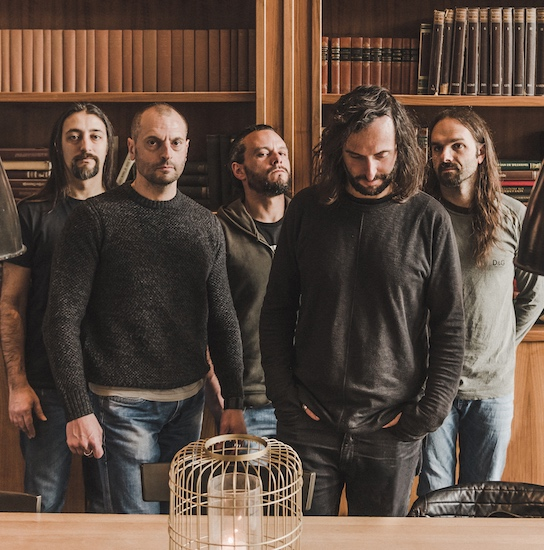
- Nosound in 2019

Background information
- Origin: Rome, Italy
- Genres: Alternative rock; post-rock; electronic; ambient
- Years active: 2002–present
- Label: Kscope
- Members: Giancarlo Erra; Orazio Fabbri; Paolo Vigliarolo; Marco Berni; Daniele Michelacci
- Past members: Paolo Martellacci; Gigi Zito; Gabrele Savini; Giulio Caneponi; Alessandro Luci; Ciro Iavarone
- Website: nosound.net

Nosound is an Italian alternative rock band started in 2002 by Giancarlo Erra. The group plays music in several different genres, including alternative rock, post rock, electronic, and ambient. All their early recordings were composed, performed, produced, engineered, and released by Erra, who subsequently formed Nosound in 2006.

Two of the band's albums have won the Italian Rock/Prog Music Awards Best Recording honor: Lightdark – 2008 Best Recording and A Sense of Loss – 2009 Best Recording.

== Band history ==
=== Solo project (2002–2006) ===
Nosound started as a project created by Giancarlo Erra in 2002. He recorded several solo works, at least one of which is unreleased. His early recordings date back to 1998, with an eight-track demo titled Radici and a nineteen-minute instrumental track on the demo CD Maslova. Bassist Alessandro Luci contributed to some of the early tracks. Erra describes the music as "evocative and intense, with personal songwriting". Waves on Russia was the first officially released Nosound demo in 2002, followed by the first promo, for Sol29.

=== Nosound (2006–present) ===
These demos generated enough interest for Erra to play his music live. He began by assembling a number of musicians, which eventually turned into a band. The official Nosound debut album, Sol29, was released in March 2005. A short tour followed and resulted in a live DVD, The World Is Outside, in 2006, containing previously unreleased material. A limited-edition live CD, Slow, It Goes, was issued in the first half of 2007. The EP Clouds, containing three outtakes from the upcoming album Lightdark, was released.

Lightdark, Nosound's second studio album, was released in February 2008. It features collaborations with singer Tim Bowness (No-Man) and Marianne DeChastelaine on cello. A remastered edition of Sol29 was issued in conjunction with Lightdark. The album received official recognition by winning the Best Recording award at the Italian Progressive Music Awards Ceremony.

In July 2008, the band signed to the new post-progressive label Kscope/Snapper and planned to play a few festivals before returning to the studio later that year to start recording their next album. Kscope also released a 2–cd edition of Lightdark, which included a five-track bonus disc.

In 2009, Nosound released their third studio album, titled A Sense of Loss. It featured a four-string band collaboration that gave it a post-rock feel. For the second year in a row, the album won the Best Recording award at the Italian Progressive Music Awards.

In 2012, an EP titled At the Pier was released, featuring new band members Chris Maitland (formerly of Porcupine Tree) on percussion and Marco Berni on keyboards. This release was in advance of a new studio album, which was to be released in early 2013. The EP also featured Marianne DeChastelaine on cello.

The band began work on their next album, Afterthoughts, in 2012. Released in May 2013, the record included new drummer Giulio Caneponi and again featured cellist Marianne DeChastelaine.

In 2014, Nosound was invited to play at the Starmus Festival in Tenerife, Canary Islands. The band recorded their performance and released it in April 2015.

In 2016, the band issued their sixth studio album, Scintilla, which featured a collaboration with Anathema vocalist Vincent Cavanagh.

The band spent 2017 touring and working on their next studio album, Allow Yourself, which was released on 21 September 2018.

== Band members ==
Current

- Giancarlo Erra – lead vocals, lead guitar, keyboards (2002–present)
- Orazio Fabbri – bass guitar (2018–present)
- Paolo Vigliarolo – rhythm guitar, acoustic guitar (2007–present)
- Marco Berni – keyboards, backing vocals (2012–present)
- Daniele Michelacci – drums (2019–present)

Past

- Paolo Martellacci – keyboards (2006–2012)
- Gigi Zito – drums (2006–2012)
- Gabrele Savini – rhythm guitar, acoustic guitar (2006–2007)
- Giulio Caneponi – drums (2012–2017)
- Alessandro Luci – bass (2002–2018)
- Ciro Iavarone – drums (2017–2018)

=== Lineups ===
2002–2006	Giancarlo Erra – lead vocals, lead guitar, rhythm guitar, bass guitar, keyboards, drums; Alessandro Luci – bass guitar, keyboards
2006–2007	Giancarlo Erra – lead vocals, lead guitar, keyboards; Alessandro Luci – bass guitar, keyboards; Paolo Martellacci – keyboards; Gabrele Savini – rhythm guitar, acoustic guitar; Gigi Zito – drums
2007–2012	Giancarlo Erra – lead vocals, lead guitar, keyboards; Alessandro Luci – bass guitar, keyboards; Paolo Martellacci – keyboards; Gigi Zito – drums; Paolo Vigliarolo – rhythm guitar, acoustic guitar
2012	Giancarlo Erra – lead vocals, lead guitar, keyboards; Alessandro Luci – bass guitar, keyboards; Paolo Vigliarolo – rhythm guitar, acoustic guitar; Marco Berni – keyboards, backing vocals
2012–2013	Giancarlo Erra – lead vocals, lead guitar, keyboards; Alessandro Luci – bass guitar, keyboards; Paolo Vigliarolo – rhythm guitar, acoustic guitar; Marco Berni – keyboards, backing vocals; Giulio Caneponi – drums
2013–2018	Giancarlo Erra – lead vocals, lead guitar, keyboards; Alessandro Luci – bass guitar, keyboards; Paolo Vigliarolo – rhythm guitar, acoustic guitar; Marco Berni – keyboards, backing vocals; Ciro Iavarone – drums
2019–present	Giancarlo Erra – lead vocals, lead guitar, keyboards; Paolo Vigliarolo – guitars; Marco Berni – keyboards; Orazio Fabbri – bass; Daniele Michelacci – drums

Timeline

=== Notable contributors ===
- Tim Bowness – vocals/lyrics on Lightdark: "Someone Starts to Fade Away"
- Marianne DeChastelaine – cello on Lightdark, At the Pier, Afterthoughts, and Scintilla
- Chris Maitland – drums on At the Pier and Afterthoughts
- Vincent Cavanagh – vocals on Scintilla: "In Celebration of Life" and "Perfect Wife"

== Discography ==
=== Studio albums ===
- Sol29 (2005)
- Lightdark (2008)
- A Sense of Loss (2009)
- Afterthoughts (2013)
- Scintilla (2016)
- Allow Yourself (2018)

=== EPs ===
- Slow, It Goes (2007)
- Clouds (2007)
- At the Pier (2012)
- Saviour (2019)
- To the Core (2025)

=== Live albums ===
- The World Is Outside (2006)
- The Northern Religion of Things (2011)
- Teide 2390 (2015)
- This Night (2021)

=== Compilations ===
- Introducing Nosound (2015)

=== Promotional ===
- Nosound Promo 2004 (2004)
- Lightdark Promotional (2008)

=== Demos ===
- Radici (1998)
- Maslova (2001)
- Waves on Russia (2002)

== Videography ==
- Sol29 Clip DVD (2005)
- The World Is Outside DVD (2006)
