= Zerra 1 =

Irish new wave band

Zerra One
- Origin: Wexford, County Wexford, Ireland
- Genres: New wave
- Years active: 1982–1987
- Labels: Mercury, Top Hole, Second Vision
- Past members: Paul Bell; Andreas Grimminger; Adrian Wyatt; Mike Mesbur; Korda Marshall; Anthony Drennan; Eamonn Doyle; Ian Penman
- Website: https://www.facebook.com/groups/110249542375562 YouTube Channel = https://www.youtube.com/@ZerraOneIreland

Zerra One (also known as Zerra 1) were an Irish new wave band formed in Ireland in 1982. They recorded two albums but split up in 1987 due to a lack of commercial success.

== History ==
Zerra One were formed in 1982 by vocalist and keyboardist Paul Bell, guitarist Andreas Grimminger, bassist Adrian Wyatt and drummer Mike Mesbur. That year, the band supported The Cure on their UK and European tour in April–June, and released "Let's Go Home" as their debut single. It was released by Top Hole Records in the Netherlands only. Later in December, the band supported U2 for five dates. Two singles were released in the UK during 1983 on the Second Vision label. Although "The West's Awake" and "The Banner Of Love (How I Run to You)" did not generate any major commercial success, the latter single reached No. 33 on the UK Independent Singles Chart.

In February–March 1984, the band toured as a support act of The Boomtown Rats. The same year saw the band signing to Mercury. Their first single for the label was "Ten Thousand Voices, Message from the Peoples". That year, their self-titled debut album was also released, which spawned the singles "Tumbling Down" and "Mountains and Water". Released across Europe, the album was produced by Todd Rundgren, but failed to give the band their commercial breakthrough. A revised version of the album was released in Canada in 1985 on the Vertigo label. It was re-titled Mountains and Water. A remix of "Rain", taken from the debut album, was released in the UK in 1985.

Mesbur was replaced by Korda Marshall during 1984. Recording sessions for the band's second album spanned from May 1985 to April 1986, however by this time both Marshall and Wyatt had left the band, with Marshall going on to launch independent record label Infectious Music. Wyatt was replaced by Eamo Doyle, making the band a trio. On the album, drums were mostly provided by Pete Thomas and Gavin Harrison. "Rescue Me", the first single from the album, was released in October 1985 and reached No. 82 in the UK in early 1986. However, the band were unable to capitalise on the chart entry. The album, The Domino Effect, was not a commercial success, along with two further singles "Forever and Ever" and "Domino Effect". In late 1986, the band supported Ultravox. They focused on trying to break the American market in 1987, but disbanded later that year.

2025 finally saw Zerra One added to major streaming platforms such as Spotify, Apple Music, YouTube Music and other available services.

== Members ==
- Paul Bell - lead vocals, keyboards (1982–87)
- Andreas Grimminger - guitar (1982–87)
- Adrian Wyatt - bass (1982–85)
- Eamo Doyle - bass (1985–87)
- Mike Mesbur - drums (1982–84)
- Korda Marshall - drums (1984–85)
- Ian Penman - keyboards (1984)

== Discography ==
Albums

- Zerra 1 (1984)
- Mountains and Water (1985)
- The Domino Effect (1986)

Singles

- "Let's Go Home" (1982)
- "The West's Awake" (1983)
- "The Banner of Love (How I Run to You)" (1983)
- "Ten Thousand Voices, Message from the Peoples" (1984) No.112 UK
- "Tumbling Down" (1984)
- "Mountains and Water" (1984) No.152 UK
- "Rain (Remix)" (1985)
- "Rescue Me" (1985) No.82 UK
- "Forever and Ever" (1986)
- "Domino Effect" (1986)
