= A Sense of Loss (album) =

Studio album by Nosound
- Released: October 2009
- Recorded: 2009
- Genres: Progressive rock, art rock
- Length: 51:31
- Label: Kscope UK

Nosound chronology
Lightdark (2008)	A Sense of Loss (2009)	The northern religion of things (2011)

A Sense of Loss is an album by the progressive rock band Nosound, released on Kscope.

The main release came in a DVD featuring the music formatted for the 5.1 surround sound system with 24bit (high quality) mixes of the songs. It introduced an alternate version of Fading Silently with an extended guitar solo. It also included song videos, a picture, and a video gallery.

== Reception ==
Professional ratings
Review scores
Source	Rating
AllMusic	3.5/5 stars

Alex Henderson of AllMusic wrote that bandleader Giancarlo Erra "finds a lot of beauty in his melancholia, drawing on influences that include Pink Floyd, Brian Eno... Tangerine Dream, Porcupine Tree and Orchestral Maneuvers in the Dark (OMD)."

== Track listing ==
All tracks are written by Giancarlo Erra except where noted.

A Sense of Loss
No.	Title	Length
1.	"Some Warmth into This Chill"	7:55
2.	"Fading Silently"	8:27
3.	"Tender Claim"	8:07
4.	"My Apology"	5:41
5.	"Constant Contrast"	5:43
6.	"Winter Will Come"	15:39

== Personnel ==
- Giancarlo Erra – vocals, guitar, keyboards
- Paolo Martelacci – keyboards, vocals
- Paolo Vigliarolo – acoustic guitar
- Alessandro Luci – bass guitar
- Gigi Zito – percussion, vocals
