= Fear of a Blank Planet (song) =

2007 song by Porcupine Tree

- Cover of the Roadrunner Records promo single.

Promotional single by Porcupine Tree

from the album Fear of a Blank Planet
- Released: 2007
- Recorded: October–December 2006
- Genre: Progressive rock; progressive metal
- Length: 7:28 (album version); 4:18 (single version)
- Label: Roadrunner Records
- Songwriter: Steven Wilson

Porcupine Tree singles chronology
"Lazarus" (2005)	"Fear of a Blank Planet" (2007)	"Way Out of Here" (2007)

"Fear of a Blank Planet" is a Porcupine Tree song released in 2007. It appears as the first track on the album of the same name.

A promotional single of the song was released in Europe and the United States, by respective record labels. Both promos contain an edited version of "Fear of a Blank Planet" with the swearing removed. The lyrics deal with two common neurobehavioural developmental disorders for teenagers in the 21st century: bipolar disorder and attention deficit disorder.

== Music video ==
On 16 April 2007, the same day as the European release date, the music video for the title track was released on MySpace, though it was temporarily removed a day later in the wake of the shootings at Virginia Tech. On 25 April 2007, the video was released on a dedicated Fear of a Blank Planet website to view in high resolution and was replaced several months later by the live projection for "Sleep Together". The video is now included as a bonus along with the 17-minute film for "Anesthetize" on the DVD-A version of Fear of a Blank Planet.

== Appearances ==
The song appears during the end credits of the video game Control.

== Track listing ==
"Fear of a Blank Planet" excerpt
An excerpt from "Fear of a Blank Planet"

US promotional CD
No.	Title	Length
1.	"Fear of a Blank Planet" (amended edit)	4:18
2.	"Fear of a Blank Planet" (explicit edit)	4:18
3.	"Fear of a Blank Planet" (album version)	7:28

EU promotional CD
No.	Title	Length
1.	"Fear of a Blank Planet" (clean edit)	4:18
2.	"Fear of a Blank Planet" (dirty edit)	4:18

== Personnel ==
Porcupine Tree

- Steven Wilson – vocals, guitar
- Richard Barbieri – keyboards
- Colin Edwin – bass
- Gavin Harrison – drums

Additional musicians

- John Wesley – backing vocals

== Live version ==
"Fear of a Blank Planet"

Single by Porcupine Tree

from the album Closure/Continuation.Live
- Released: 1 December 2023
- Recorded: 7 November 2022
- Venue: Ziggo Dome (Amsterdam)
- Genre: Progressive rock; progressive metal
- Length: 9:08
- Label: Music for Nations
- Songwriter: Wilson

On 1 December 2023, a live version of the track would be released as the second and final single in promotion of the band's live album Closure/Continuation.Live, the first single being "Harridan". The live version of the track was recorded on 7 November 2022 at the Ziggo Dome arena in Amsterdam, Netherlands by Music for Nations. The single was released alongside a live video.

In honor of Richard Barbieri, who was formerly in a band called Japan. The lyric "he's in a band, they sound like Pearl Jam" was changed to "he's in a band, they sound like Japan".

=== Personnel ===
Porcupine Tree

- Steven Wilson – vocals, guitars
- Richard Barbieri – keyboards
- Gavin Harrison – drums

Touring

- Randy McStine – guitars, backing vocals
- Nate Navarro – bass
