= Your Wilderness =

2016 studio album by the Pineapple Thief

Studio album by The Pineapple Thief
- Released: 12 August 2016
- Genre: Progressive rock, alternative rock
- Length: 41:04
- Label: Kscope
- Producer: Bruce Soord

The Pineapple Thief chronology
| Magnolia (2014) | Your Wilderness (2016) | Dissolution (2018) |

Professional ratings
Review scores
| Source | Rating |
|---|---|
| AllMusic | 3.5/5 stars |
| SputnikMusic | 3.7 stars on a 5-point scale |
| PopMatters | 6/10 stars |

Your Wilderness is the eleventh studio album by British rock band The Pineapple Thief. The album features guest musicians including Gavin Harrison (Porcupine Tree, King Crimson), John Helliwell (Supertramp), and Geoffrey Richardson (Caravan).

== Track listing ==
All tracks are written by Bruce Soord.

| No. | Title | Length |
|---|---|---|
| 1. | "In Exile" | 5:10 |
| 2. | "No Man's Land" | 4:17 |
| 3. | "Tear You Up" | 4:51 |
| 4. | "That Shore" | 4:52 |
| 5. | "Take Your Shot" | 4:33 |
| 6. | "Fend for Yourself" | 3:43 |
| 7. | "The Final Thing on My Mind" | 9:53 |
| 8. | "Where We Stood" | 3:45 |
| Total length: | | 41:04 |

Bonus CD (Tour Edition)
| No. | Title | Length |
|---|---|---|
| 1. | "Fend for Yourself (Acoustic)" | 3:01 |
| 2. | "Tear You Up (Acoustic)" | 4:34 |
| 3. | "No Man's Land (Acoustic)" | 3:59 |
| 4. | "That Shore (Acoustic)" | 4:02 |
| 5. | "The Final Thing on My Mind (Acoustic)" | 9:00 |
| Total length: | | 24:36 |

== 8 Years Later ==
8 Years Later is a bonus disc included with the deluxe edition of Your Wilderness. The disc consists of a single 40-minute track seamlessly blending seven songs. It was later released on 21 April 2018 on white vinyl as an exclusive for Record Store Day.

=== Track listing ===
| No. | Title | Length |
|---|---|---|
| 1. | "Strung Out" | 3:53 |
| 2. | "Dawn Again" | 3:53 |
| 3. | "Ritual" | 4:31 |
| 4. | "The Toil" | 3:58 |
| 5. | "Hallucinations and Delusions" | 5:36 |
| 6. | "The Confined Escape" | 7:59 |
| 7. | "Our Shelter" | 10:11 |
| Total length: | | 40:01 |

== Personnel ==
Band

- Bruce Soord – Vocals, guitar, composition
- Jon Sykes – Bass guitar
- Steve Kitch – Keyboards

Additional musicians

- Darran Charles – Guitar
- Gavin Harrison – Drums
- John Helliwell – Clarinet
- Geoffrey Richardson – String arrangements

Production

- Arranged by The Pineapple Thief
- Produced and engineered by Bruce Soord and Steve Kitch
- 5.1 mixed by Bruce Soord
- Mastered by Steve Kitch at Audiomaster

== Charts ==
| Chart (2016) | Peak position |
|---|---|
| Belgian Albums (Ultratop Flanders) | 136 |
| Belgian Albums (Ultratop Wallonia) | 91 |
| Dutch Albums (Album Top 100) | 40 |
| French Albums (SNEP) | 185 |
| German Albums (Offizielle Top 100) | 57 |
| Scottish Albums (OCC) | 35 |
| Swiss Albums (Schweizer Hitparade) | 48 |
| UK Albums (OCC) | 54 |
| UK Independent Albums (OCC) | 7 |
| UK Progressive Albums (OCC) | 2 |
