= The Pineapple Thief =

British progressive rock band

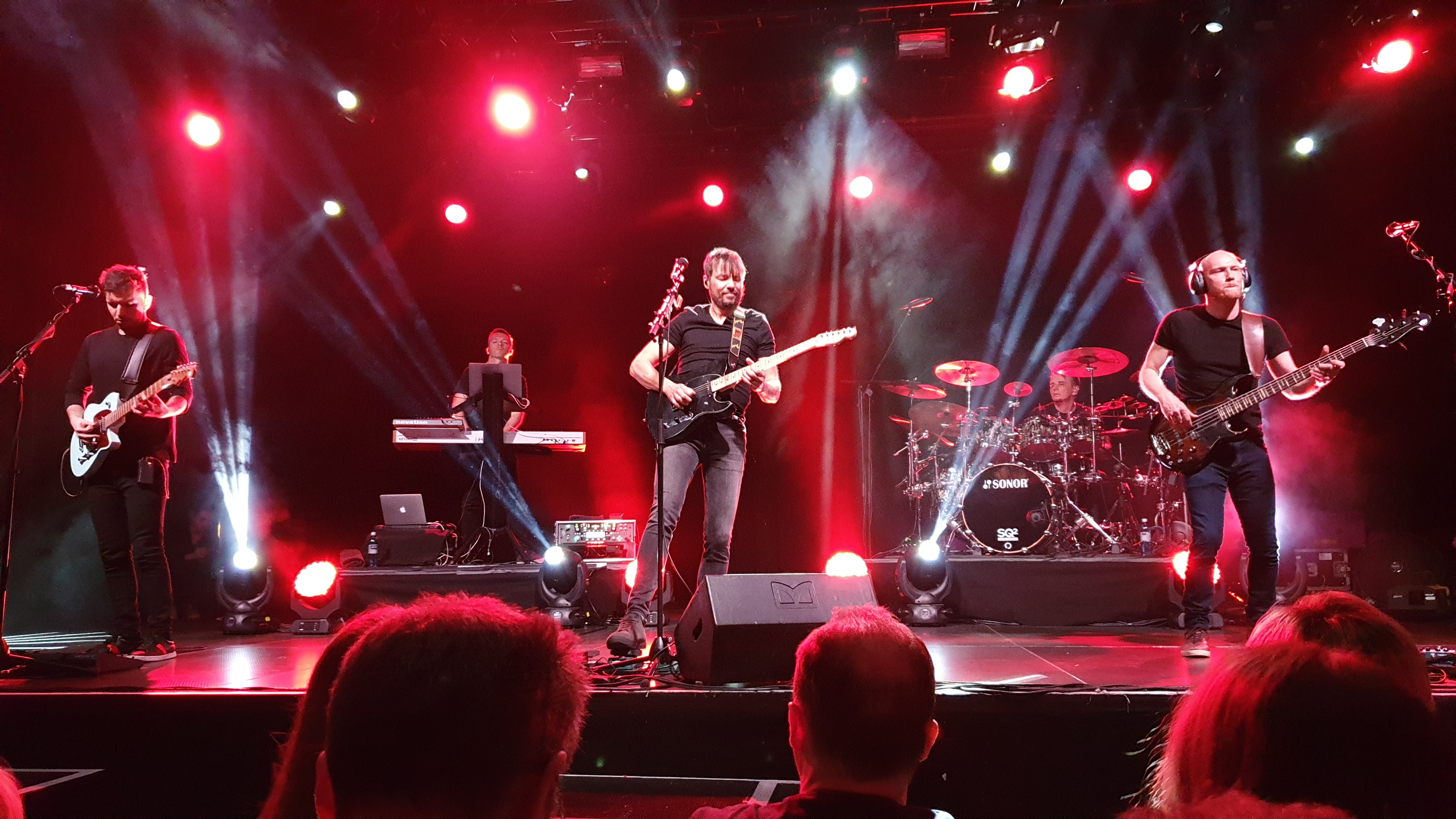
- The Pineapple Thief performing in 2019

Background information
- Origin: Yeovil, Somerset, England
- Genre: Progressive rock
- Years active: 1999–present
- Labels: InsideOut Music, Kscope, Cyclops
- Members: Bruce Soord; Jon Sykes; Steve Kitch; Gavin Harrison
- Past members: Keith Harrison; Wayne Higgins; Matt O'Leary; Dan Osborne; Darran Charles; George Marios
- Website: pineapplethief.com

The Pineapple Thief are an English progressive rock band founded in 1999 by Bruce Soord in Yeovil, Somerset. As of June 2024, the group consists of Soord on vocals, guitars, and keyboards, Jon Sykes on bass, Steve Kitch on keyboards, and Gavin Harrison on drums. They have released 16 studio albums, 6 EPs, and several live and compilation albums.

== History ==
=== Early years ===
Bruce Soord started the musical project Pineapple Thief (named after a dialogue in the movie Eve's Bayou) as an outlet for his music in 1999. The project's debut album, Abducting the Unicorn, was released by Cyclops Records in 1999 and followed in 2002 by 137.

In 2003, Soord released Variations on a Dream and subsequently decided to form a band, adding "The" to its name, to differentiate its initials PT from Porcupine Tree, another English progressive rock band. Its first lineup consisted of Soord on vocals, Jon Sykes on bass, Wayne Higgins on guitar, Matt O'Leary on keyboards, and Keith Harrison on drums. As a full band, they released 12 Stories Down in 2004, re-recorded and remixed as 10 Stories Down a year later. O'Leary subsequently left the band, and Steve Kitch, who co-produced and mixed 10 Stories Down, joined on keyboards.

Following the release of Little Man in 2006, the band published What We Have Sown in late 2007 as a final Cyclops release before being signed to Kscope, a division of Snapper Music. In 2007, the Pineapple Thief's music featured in the third season of the MTV reality series The Hills; the song "Snowdrops" can be heard in episode 28.

Wayne Higgins left the band in March 2008.

=== Kscope years ===
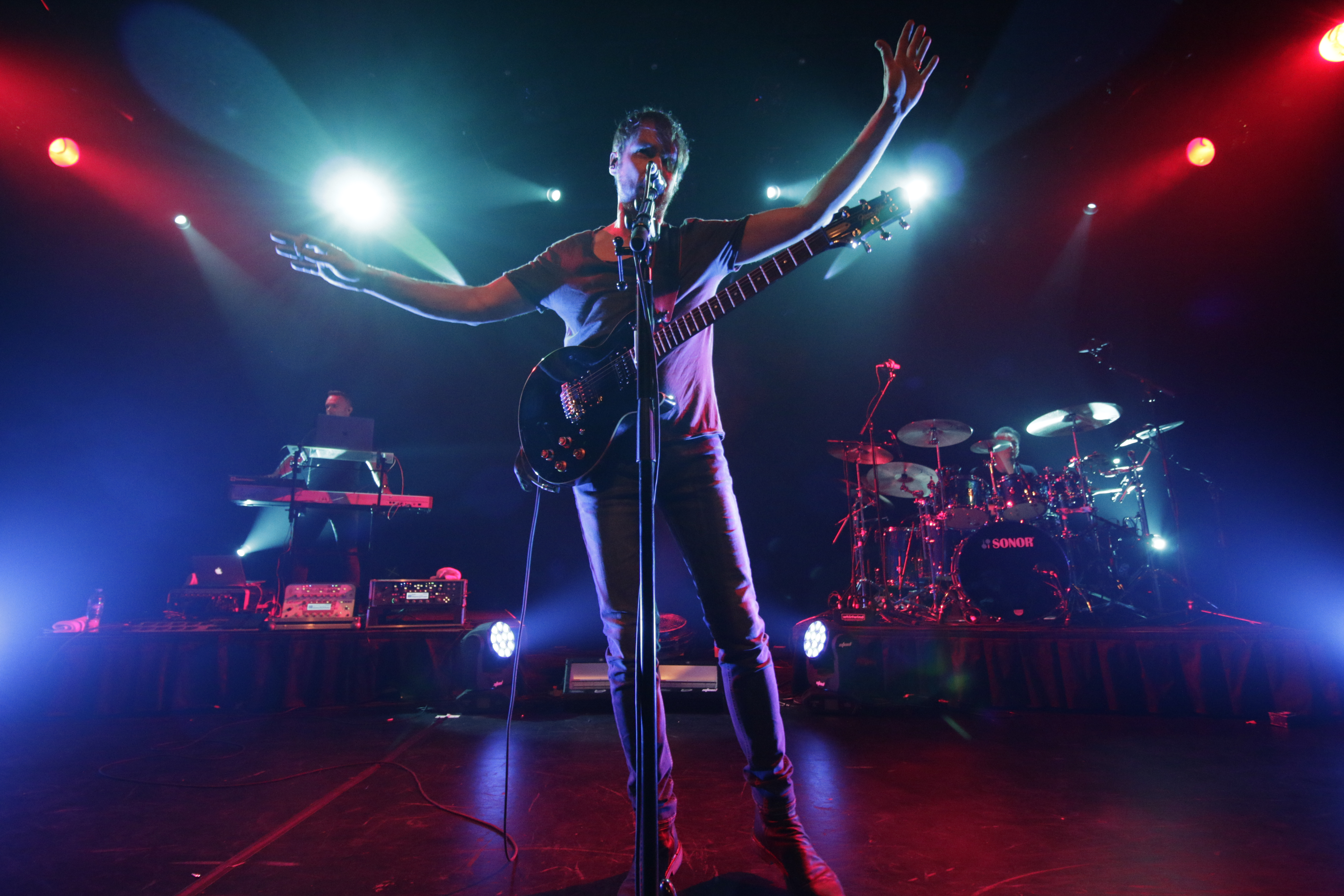
The Pineapple Thief playing at Lunario in Mexico City (2019)

In May 2008, the Pineapple Thief helped relaunch the Kscope label with their seventh studio album, Tightly Unwound. They also released a mini-documentary film on their website, featuring interviews and two exclusive live tracks.

This was followed in 2009 by the EPs The Dawn Raids Volume 1 and The Dawn Raids Volume 2 as well as the box set 3000 Days, a 2-CD remixed and remastered collection of songs from their ten-year history to date.

The band's next release, Someone Here Is Missing, came out in 2010. The album features artwork by Storm Thorgerson. It was followed by the download-only album Someone Here Is Live later that year.

The band entered the studio in 2012 to record their ninth full-length record, which included a 22-piece orchestra and choir.

In February 2014, the band announced that Dan Osborne had replaced Keith Harrison on drums.

The Pineapple Thief's tenth studio album, Magnolia, was released on 15 September 2014.

In August 2016, they issued Your Wilderness, the first record to feature drummer Gavin Harrison (Porcupine Tree, King Crimson).

In August 2018, the Pineapple Thief released their 12th studio album, Dissolution, and followed it up with Versions of the Truth in September 2020.

In February 2024, the band issued It Leads to This. Far and Wide, their 15th studio album to date, followed in October 2026.

== Band members ==
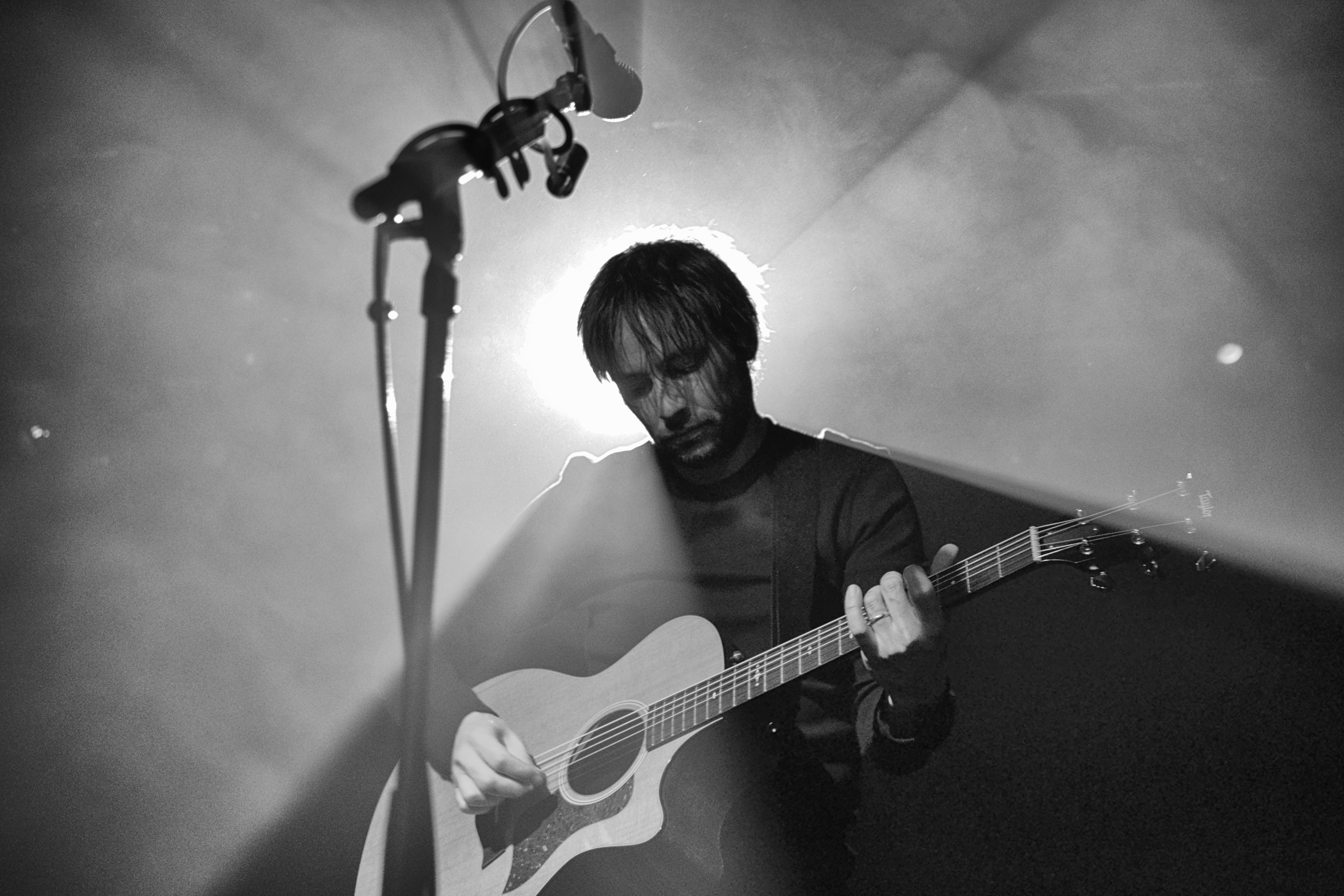
Soord

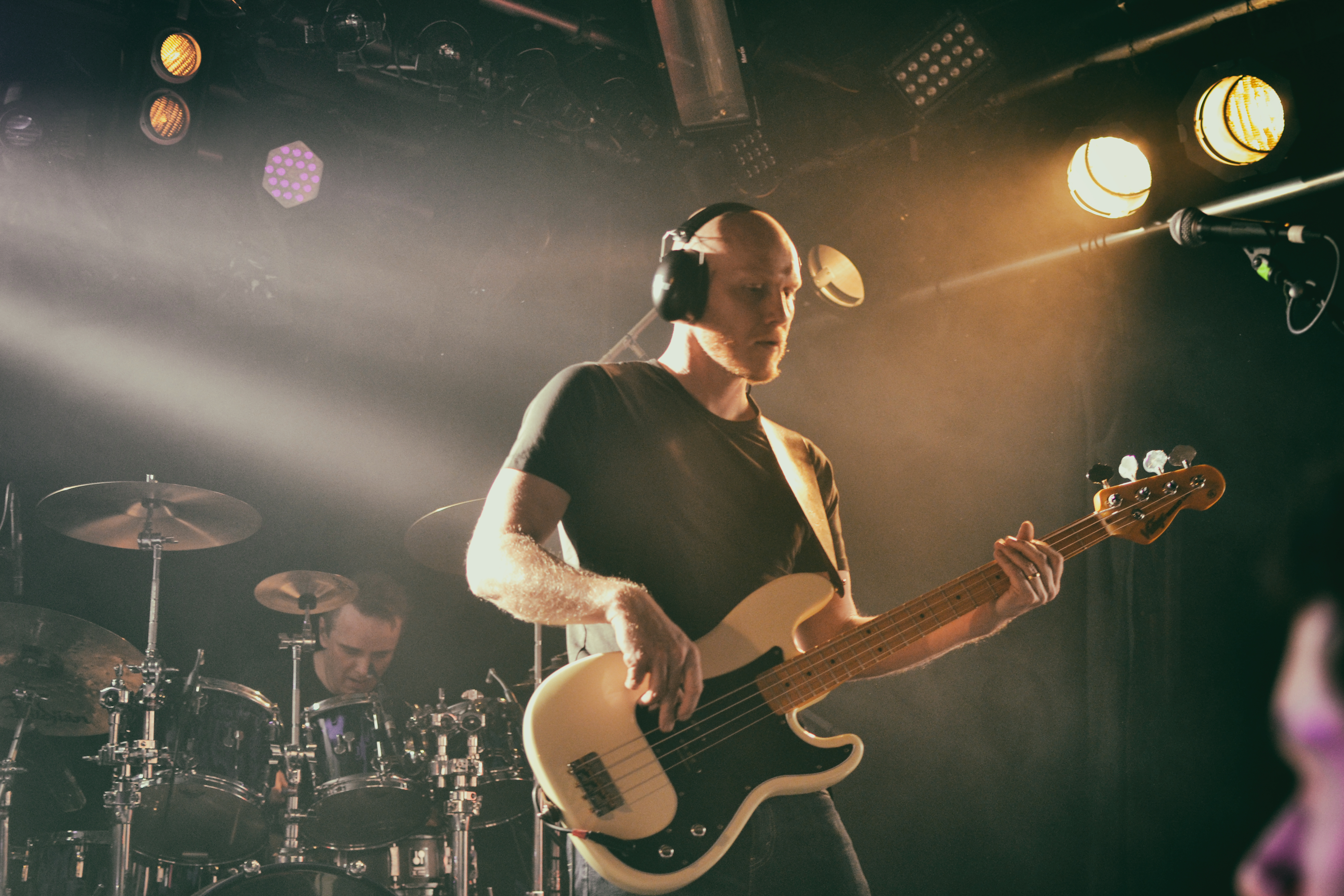
Sykes

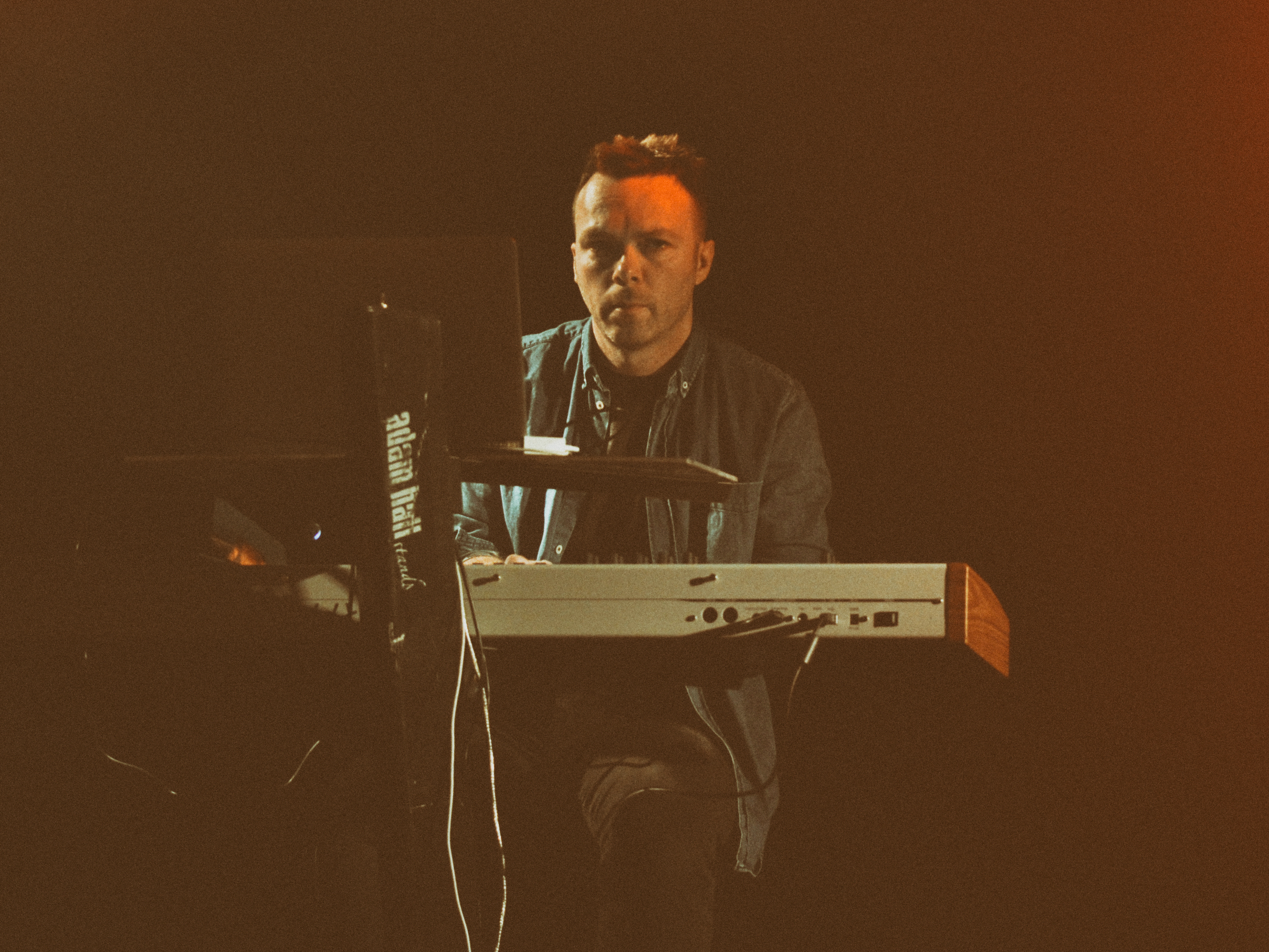
Kitch

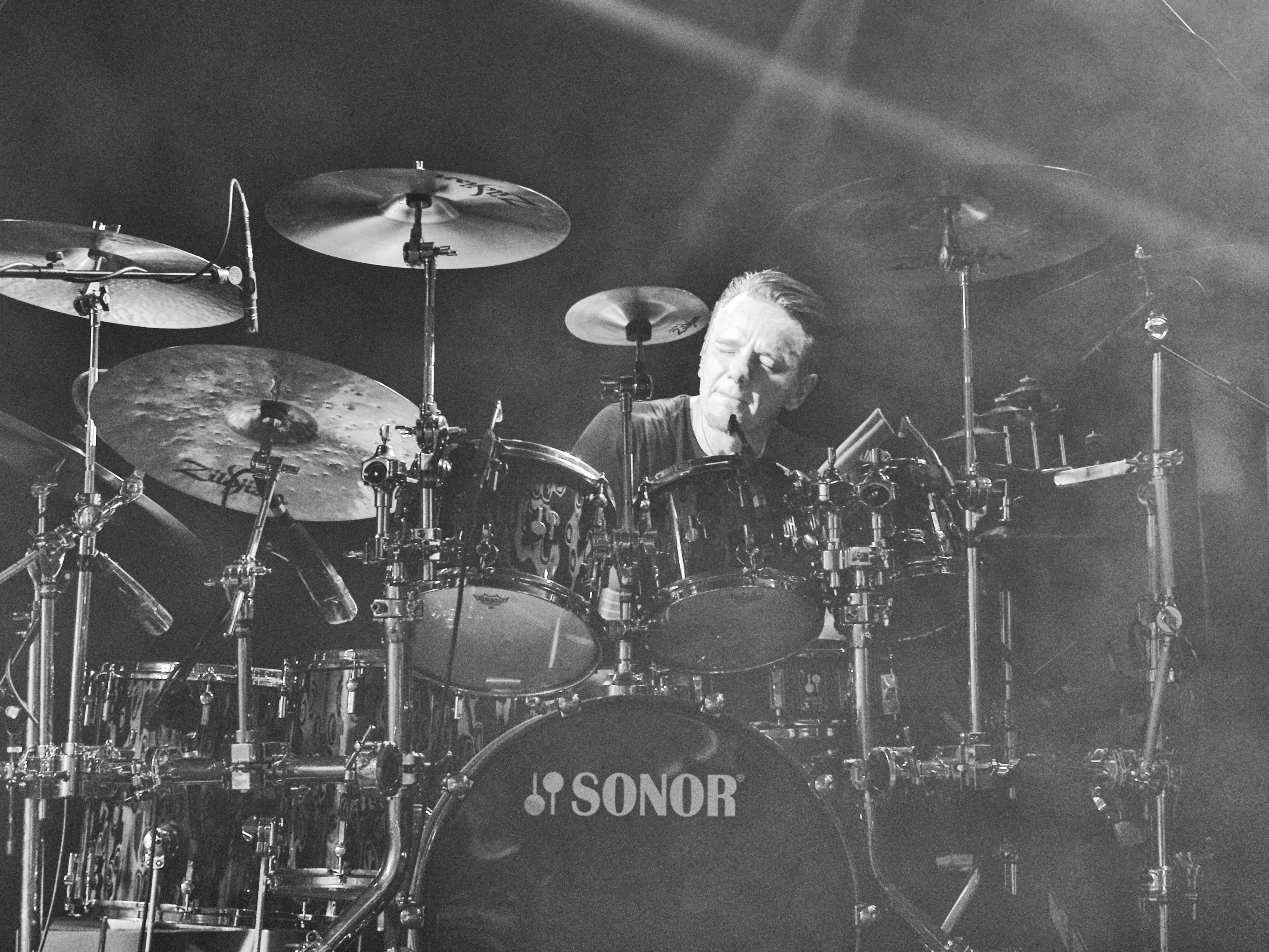
Harrison

Current

- Bruce Soord – vocals, guitars, keyboards (1999–present); bass, drums (1999–2002)
- Jon Sykes – bass guitar, vocals (2002–present)
- Steve Kitch – keyboards (2005–present)
- Gavin Harrison – drums (2017–present)

Past

- Keith Harrison – drums, vocals (2002–2013)
- Wayne Higgins – guitars, vocals (2002–2008)
- Matt O'Leary – keyboards (2002–2005)
- Dan Osborne – drums, vocals (2013–2016)

Session/live

- Darran Charles – guitars, vocals (2014–2017)
- Gavin Harrison – drums (2016)
- George Marios – guitar, vocals (2018–2021)
- Beren Matthews – guitar, vocals (2021–present)

Timeline

== Discography ==
Studio albums

- Abducting the Unicorn (1999) – re-released in 2017 as Abducted at Birth, remastered with one bonus track
- 137 (2002)
- Variations on a Dream (2003)
- 10 Stories Down (2005) – initially released as 12 Stories Down in 2004
- Little Man (2006)
- What We Have Sown (2007)
- Tightly Unwound (2008)
- Someone Here Is Missing (2010)
- All the Wars (2012)
- Magnolia (2014)
- Your Wilderness (2016)
- 8 Years Later (2016)
- Dissolution (2018)
- Versions of the Truth (2020)
- Give It Back (2022)
- It Leads to This (2024)
- Far and Wide (2026)

Live and video albums

- Live (2003) – DVD/CD + 4 new studio tracks
- Live at the Half Moon, Putney (2008) – video
- Someone Here Is Live (2010) – download only, recorded October 2010
- Live at the 013 (2013) – download only, recorded November 2012
- Live 2014 (2014) – download only, recorded November 2014
- Where We Stood (2017) – DVD/CD, recorded February 2017
- Hold Our Fire (2019) – CD, recorded September 2018
- Nothing But the Truth (2021) – DVD/CD, live studio recording

Compilations and box sets

- 3000 Days (2009)
- Introducing the Pineapple Thief (2013)
- How Did We Find Our Way (1999–2006) (2023)
- Retracing Our Steps (2007–2014) (2025)

EPs

- 4 Stories Down (2005)
- The Dawn Raids Volume 1 (2009)
- The Dawn Raids Volume 2 (2009)
- Show a Little Love (2010)
- Build a World (2013)
- Uncovering Your Tracks (2020) – re-recorded songs
- Last to Run (2024)

Singles

- "Sherbert Gods" (2001) – 7" single
- "Shoot First'" (2008) – download-only single
- "Nothing at Best" (2010) – download-only single

Music videos

- "Shoot First" (2008)
- "Nothing at Best" (2010)
- "Show a Little Love" (2010)
- "Someone Here Is Missing" (2010)
- "All the Wars" (2012)
- "Someone Pull Me Out of Here" (2012)
- "Build a World" (2013)
- "Simple as That" (2014)
- "A Sense of Fear" (2014)
- "In Exile" (2016)
- "Try as I Might" (2018)
- "Demons" (2020)
- "Break It All" (2020)
- "Versions of the Truth" (2020)
- "Driving Like Maniacs" (2020)
- "The Frost" (2023)
- "It Leads to This" (2024)
