= Fear of a Blank Planet =

2007 album by Porcupine Tree

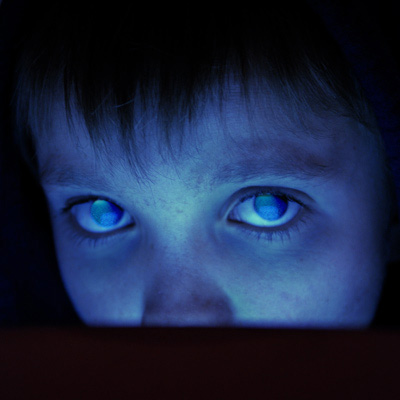

Studio album by Porcupine Tree
- Released: 16 April 2007
- Recorded: London, England; Tel Aviv, Israel October–December 2006
- Studios: No Man's Land (Hemel Hempstead); Bourne Place; New Rising; The Artillery; Nightspace; Mark Angelo; Red Room Recorders; DGM
- Genres: Progressive rock; progressive metal; art rock; alternative rock
- Length: 50:48 (CD and remastered vinyl); 79:32 (original vinyl)
- Labels: Roadrunner (Europe); Atlantic (US)
- Producer: Porcupine Tree

Porcupine Tree chronology
Deadwing (2005)	Fear of a Blank Planet (2007)	The Incident (2009)

Singles from Fear of a Blank Planet
- 1. "Fear of a Blank Planet" Released: April 2007; 2. "Way Out of Here" Released: 2007

Steven Wilson chronology
Deadwing (2005)	Fear of a Blank Planet (2007)	Insurgentes (2008)

Fear of a Blank Planet is the ninth studio album by British progressive rock band Porcupine Tree and their best selling before 2009's The Incident. It was released on 16 April 2007 in the UK and the rest of Europe by Roadrunner, 24 April 2007 in the United States by Atlantic, 25 April 2007 in Japan by WHD, and 1 May 2007 in Canada by WEA. Steven Wilson has mentioned that the album's title is a direct reference to the 1990 Public Enemy album Fear of a Black Planet; while the former tackled race issues, the latter is about the fear of losing the current generation of youth to various common threats to their mental and social wellbeing, including broken homes, excessive "screen time", and narcotic overuse (prescribed and otherwise) to the point of mental and spiritual "blankness".

The album was written in Tel Aviv and London between January and July 2006. The promotion of the record included a premiere performance of the songs during the shows in support of the Arriving Somewhere... DVD tour between September and November 2006, and a series of listening parties at New York's Legacy Studios, and London's Abbey Road Studios during January 2007.

Fear of a Blank Planet was followed later the same year by release of the Nil Recurring extended play. An additional track titled "Always Recurring" was demoed yet did not receive a formal release on any of the four records (the Fear of a Blank Planet LP, the "Fear of a Blank Planet" single, the "Way Out of Here" single, and the Nil Recurring EP) released by Porcupine Tree during this era. With the release of Insurgentes, Wilson's debut solo album, Wilson would further develop some of the ideas on which Fear of a Blank Planet is conceived.

The album charted in almost all European countries and entered the US Billboard 200 at number 59. The album was highly acclaimed by critics and was awarded "Album of the Year" by Classic Rock magazine in 2007.

== Writing and recording ==
Steven Wilson started writing the album in early 2006 in Tel Aviv, while he was recording the second Blackfield album. One of the first songs that Wilson wrote for the album during this period, called "Always Recurring" (which is an unreleased track), would later be recycled lyrically and sonically, for use in the track "What Happens Now?". In the meantime, while Wilson was in Tel Aviv, Richard Barbieri wrote most of the music for the song "My Ashes". "Cheating the Polygraph" was a Harrison/Wilson composition whilst "Way Out of Here", "What Happens Now?" and "Nil Recurring" were written by all four band members. The Blackfield album was finished in June, so Wilson travelled back to London and met the other band members to work on the material he had been writing. These sessions took place between July and August and produced a good number of songs from which just six were picked for the record.

Porcupine Tree's first DVD, entitled Arriving Somewhere..., was released in August of the same year. The band started a short tour in September to promote it, during which the six new songs selected for the forthcoming album were performed at the first half of the shows. Along the tour, which lasted until November, the band began recording the album, eventually rejecting the song "Cheating the Polygraph" since they felt it was somewhat weak when compared to the other five of the live set list; they wrote a new song called "Way Out of Here" to replace it. "Way Out of Here" was a collaboration between all band members and resulted in the only full-band composition of the record. They contacted King Crimson's guitarist Robert Fripp, who provided soundscapes to the song as well as lead guitar for the track "Nil Recurring", an instrumental song not included in the album but later released in the EP of the same name (which also included "Cheating the Polygraph").

Around the time of the recording, Wilson read an interview in Classic Rock magazine in which Rush's guitarist Alex Lifeson had mentioned he was a big fan of Porcupine Tree. Wilson quickly got in touch with Alex to ask him if he would like to play on the album. Lifeson was pleased to contribute so Wilson wrote a section of the song "Anesthetize" for him to play a solo on. Lifeson recorded the solo in his own studio and sent it to Wilson.

The album recording process was finished in December of the same year. In January 2007, it was revealed that the album title would be Fear of a Blank Planet.

== Concept ==
The concept of the album was heavily influenced by Bret Easton Ellis' novel Lunar Park. The novel is told from the perspective of a father, who bears the name of the novel's author himself, whereas the album is mostly from his son's perspective, an eleven-year-old kid named Robby. Many of the lyrics for Fear of a Blank Planet are lifted directly from the novel; this is particularly evident in "My Ashes", which is a homage to the last chapter, in which the ashes of Bret's father are scattered and cover the memories of his life.

The lyrics deal with two typical neurobehavioural developmental disorders affecting teenagers in the 21st century: bipolar disorder and attention deficit disorder. It also deals with other common behaviour tendencies of youth like escapism through prescription drugs, social alienation caused by technology, and a feeling of vacuity—a product of information overload by the mass media. In an interview with Revolver magazine, Wilson described the main character of the story as "...this kind of terminally bored kid, anywhere between 10 and 15 years old, who spends all his daylight hours in his bedroom with the curtains closed, playing on his PlayStation, listening to his iPod, texting his friends on his cell phone, looking at hardcore pornography on the Internet, downloading music, films, news, violence..."

The songs on Fear of a Blank Planet seem to have a connection not just between the lyrics but also musically; every track flows into the next, comprising a single fifty-minute piece of music. Wilson said the idea was to make an album that could be listened to in one sitting, in contrast to some bands tendency to make very long records that do not maintain the attention of the listener. He described Fear of a Blank Planet as a homage to 1970s records, whose moderate length helps the listener maintain focus:

"It was very much conceived in the way bands used to conceive records in the '70s, where you've got two sides of vinyl, and you can lay down a piece of music which is around the 50-minute mark, which plays in a continuous way, and deals with the same subject matter, and tried to kind of immerse you in a world for that time. That's always been the Porcupine Tree way, but we've definitely taken it to the next level."

== Release and promotion ==
A few days after the mixing and recording processes were finished, Wilson unveiled the 5.1 mix edition of the album at two listening parties at New York's Legacy Studios, and at London's Abbey Road Studios, where the official track list was finally unveiled. Additionally, there was a third pre-release listening party without the presence of Steven Wilson in the Club Phoenix of Brisbane later on 14 April, organised by OzProg.com along with Roadrunner Records. A medley of the album tracks was posted to the band's MySpace page and the Fear of a Blank Planet microsite on 21 February. Then on 6 March, the title track was released in the US iTunes Store as a bonus track with Blackfield II, the second album from Wilson's side-project Blackfield. On 12 April, the CD came out in parts of Europe four days earlier than intended, and was soon leaked onto the internet.

"Sentimental" was NPR's "Song of the Day" on 4 June.

On 6 August, on their official website, Porcupine Tree announced a new EP was going to be released on 17 September the same year named Nil Recurring, featuring four tracks (just under 30 minutes of music) that were written during the Fear of a Blank Planet sessions, including the title track featuring Robert Fripp on guitar, and "Cheating the Polygraph".

The song "My Ashes" was featured in the American television series The Shield in episode #81, entitled "Animal Control", which originally aired on 7 October 2008.

On 18 April 2007, two days after the European release of the album, the band embarked on an extensive tour until the end of the year, with a short break during August and September resuming in October. During the first run of shows, the band played all of the album either in one go, or spread throughout the set. For the second run of shows (after the release of Nil Recurring) this was stopped. Once again, Lasse Hoile worked with the band creating a video to accompany the performance of the whole album.

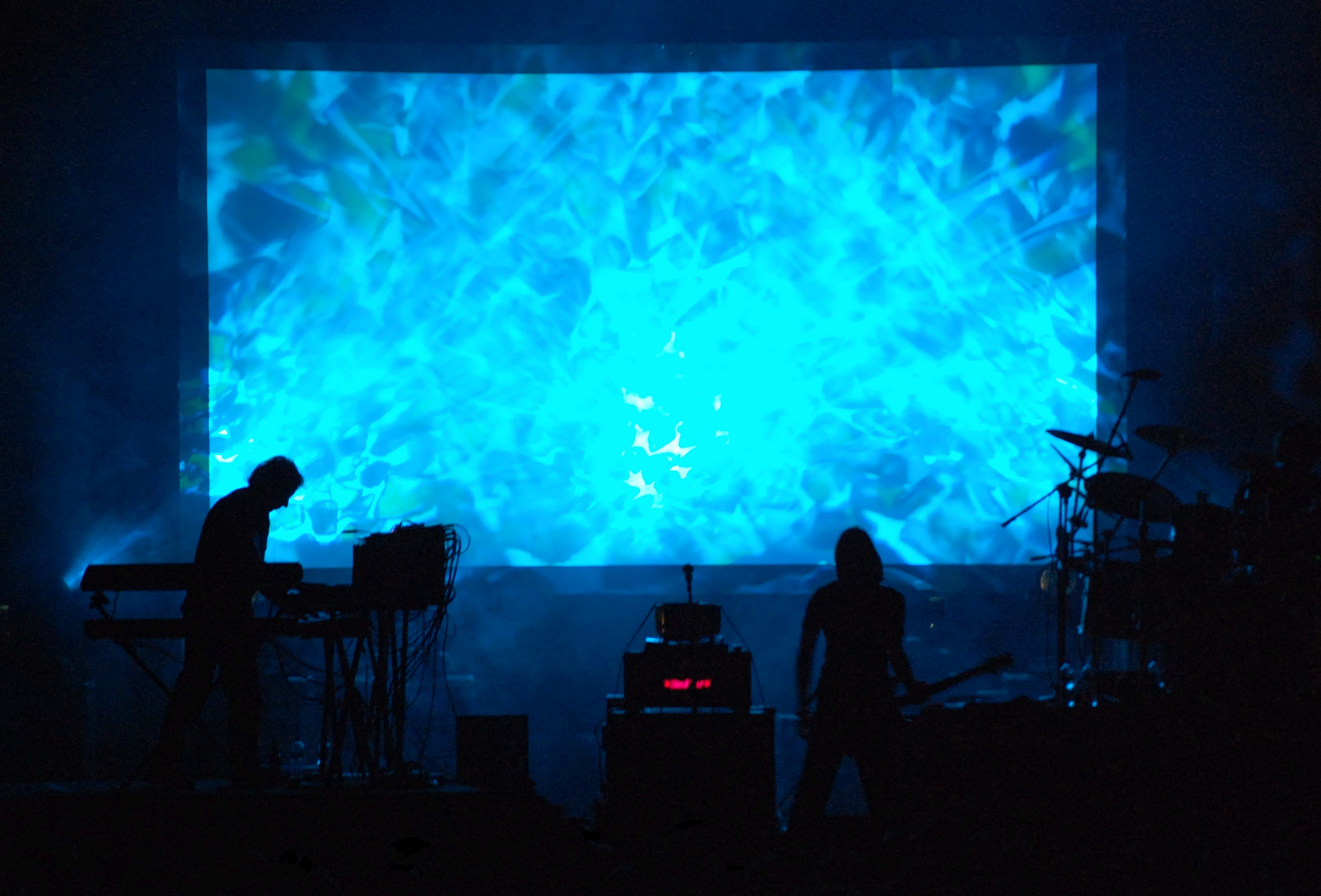
Porcupine Tree performing at Hamburg, Germany, in 11/29/2007.

Starting in Glasgow, the tour led the band through many major international music festivals such as the twins Hurricane Festival and Southside Festival in Germany, the Download Festival at Donington Park, the Voodoo Music Experience of New Orleans, and the Ilosaarirock Festival in Finland (their first show ever in this country); a radio broadcast from this performance was recorded and later remastered by the band for a release in March 2009 under the title Ilosaarirock, given away to members of the Residents of a Blank Planet ticketing club. Support acts included Pure Reason Revolution, Amplifier and Absynthe Minded across Europe, and 3 for the US. The second leg started in October in North America. Head>>Fake (only in New York City) and 3 (rest of the US and Canada) were the supporting bands during this month; that stretch of the tour included their first performance ever in Mexico at the Teatro Metropolitan of Mexico City. Alternative rock band Anathema joined them on tour from November as support for the European gigs that lasted until December (except for Finland were Hidria Spacefolk opened the show). Along 2007, they played 92 dates in total.

The tour continued in April 2008, with their first appearance ever in Australia, where they played three consecutive dates from 25 to 27 April in Melbourne, Sydney and Brisbane respectively. They performed at the Dutch Pinkpop Festival on 30 May, the Rocksound Festival of Switzerland on 6 June, the Austrian Nova Rock Festival on 13 June, the Hellfest Summer Open Air in France on 21 June and the Finnish Ruisrock on 4 July 2008. Shortly after they played for the first time in Russia, on 6 July at the B1 Club of Moscow. Thereafter in October the band started a brief European tour, during which a second official DVD was shot. The filming took place along two consecutive shows on 15 and 16 October, in Tilburg, the Netherlands, at the 013 venue. This was the final leg for the Fear of a Blank Planet tour and included their first performance ever as headliners in Portugal. Oceansize opened for the UK shows.

== Reception ==
Professional ratings
Aggregate scores
Source	Rating
Metacritic	82/100
Review scores
Source	Rating
AllMusic	4.5/5 stars
Aquarian Weekly	A+
Classic Rock	4.5/5 stars
Drowned in Sound	9/10
Metal Storm	9.2/10
Mojo	4/5 stars
musicOMH	4/5 stars
PopMatters	8/10 stars
Rock Hard	10/10
Sputnikmusic	4.5/5 stars

The album was critically acclaimed at release, receiving an average rating of 82 out of 100 on Metacritic, based on nine reviews. Q magazine regarded the album as "a dramatic, wide-screen, expertly executed, even genuinely thrilling rock record worthy of an audience way beyond nu-prog's regular constituency." AllMusic, which gave the album a 4.5 out of 5 score, assured that "While there is no "radio single" on the disc most songs transcend their complex structure and feel as provocative as any traditional rock tune". David Fricke from Rolling Stone perceived Porcupine Tree to have evolved into "an aggressively modern merger of Rush’s arena art rock, U.K. prog classicism—especially Pink Floyd’s eulogies to madness and King Crimson’s angular majesty—and the post-grunge vengeance of Tool". Greg Kot from Chicago Tribune described the sound as "stellar in its serpentine mood-shifting". Sound and Vision praised the album as the band's finest work: "Porcupine Tree is at the height of its powers" and voted it #3 CD of 2007.

Decibel lauded: "Porcupine Tree prove they can play with the best of 'em". The Phoenix newspaper stated "Fear of a Blank Planet is not only their most vintage-sounding album, it’s also their best", Jim DeRogatis from the Chicago Sun-Times thought the album was "easily as strong as any of the band's previous eight releases, and the most timely", and Revolver magazine proclaimed "England’s prog princes return at their most limber and conceptually relevant". PopMatters placed it at #5 of "The Best Metal Albums of 2007". Reason magazine chose it as one of the "Best Albums of 2007" though they were more severe than other critics about the lyrical content, saying, "lyrically, it's ridiculous" and "if your grandma was theming a prog rock album, it'd come out something like this". Dan LeRoy from Alternative Press announced it "as heavy as P-Tree have ever been" but "wistfully, sprawlingly melodic as well-sometimes in the same tune" and concluded that "if Wilson's vision of today's kids as overmedicated, overstimulated robots seems like a blatant appeal to the over-30 crowd, it's still worth setting the Xbox aside to listen".

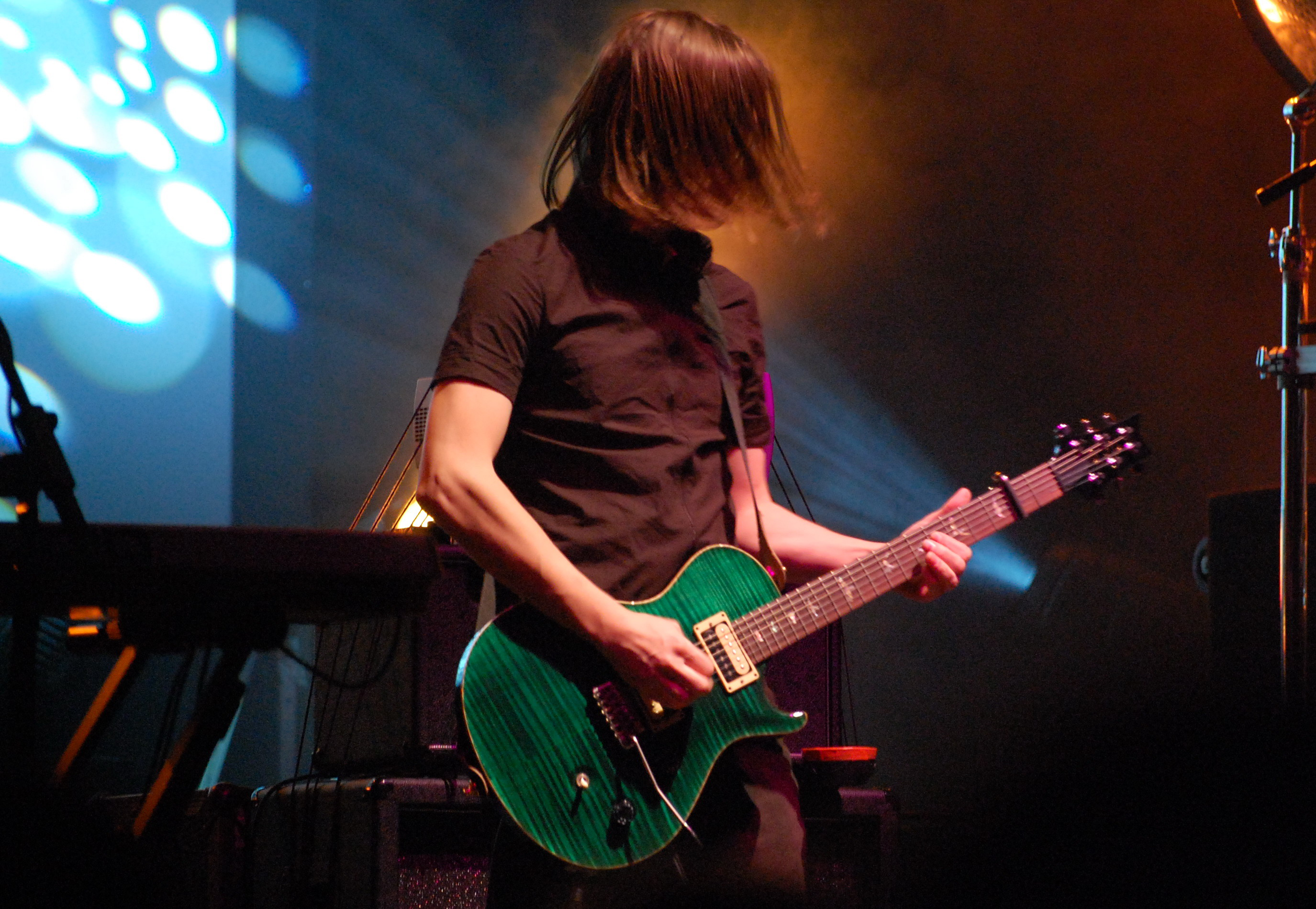
Steven Wilson live with Porcupine Tree at Arena, Poznan, Poland. 28 November 2007.

The album did well commercially. With Fear of a Blank Planet, the band broke the selling mark established by Deadwing, and reached the Top 100 of the Billboard 200 for the first time, debuting at #59. The album also entered the European Top 100 Albums at #21, and charted the Top 40 in the UK, Germany, Netherlands, Italy, Finland, Norway, Sweden and Poland. The special edition limited to 10,000 copies was sold out worldwide within the same day of its release. The album has sold 250,000 copies worldwide.

=== Accolades ===
Fear of a Blank Planet won the "Album of the Year" award for the 2007 Classic Rock magazine awards. This was the second time the band won this award, the first time being in 2005 with Deadwing. It was also the No. 1 album for 2007 on Metal Storm. On 12 December 2007, the album received a nomination for a Grammy Award in the "Best Surround Sound Album" category.

Gavin Harrison won the Modern Drummer magazine readers' poll for "Best Progressive Drummer of the Year" consecutively in 2007 and 2008; the last time he also came second in the "Best Recorded Performance" category for Fear of a Blank Planet. In 2014, readers of Rhythm voted it the fifth greatest drumming album in the history of progressive rock. DRUM! Magazine included the album in its 2012 list of the "Top 20 Drum Albums of the Last 20 Years" referring to Harrison as "today's answer to nearly any drumming question."

In 2012, Popmatters named Fear of a Blank Planet the best progressive rock album of the 2000s. Loudwire placed the album at #27 on their "Top 100 Hard Rock and Heavy Metal Albums of the 21st Century" list. In 2015, Rolling Stone ranked Fear of a Blank Planet as the 39th best progressive rock album of all time and British magazine Prog ranked the album 18th on its list of the "Top 100 Greatest Prog Albums of All Time."

== Track listing ==
All tracks are written by Steven Wilson, except where noted.

No.	Title	Music	Length
1.	"Fear of a Blank Planet"		7:28
2.	"My Ashes"	Barbieri, Wilson	5:07
3.	"Anesthetize": "Anesthetize" (feat. Alex Lifeson); "The Pills I'm Taking"; "Surfer"		17:42
4.	"Sentimental"		5:26
5.	"Way Out of Here" (feat. Robert Fripp)	Barbieri, Edwin, Harrison, Wilson	7:37
6.	"Sleep Together"		7:28
Total length:			50:48

Special edition

In addition to the regular issue, a special two-disc edition was released, containing both Stereo and 5.1 Surround Sound mixes plus a forty-page booklet. This limited edition of 10,000 copies was sold out the day of its release.

Vinyl edition

The 2LP vinyl edition was released through Tonefloat Records; there is a standard edition on 180g black vinyl in a gatefold sleeve and a special edition (limited to 1000 copies) on black/blue marbled vinyl packaged in a numbered slipcase with a 12x12" 16-page booklet. The vinyl edition has a slightly different track listing and includes the Nil Recurring EP. There is also a special pink vinyl edition limited to 500 copies released on 1 May 2008, to coincide with the band's recent appearance at the Pinkpop festival in the Netherlands. This was originally provided to Dutch record stores only but was made available for purchase from the band's online store for a very limited run from 14 June 2008. The stock lasted less than five days.

Side one

All tracks are written by Steven Wilson (except noted).

No.	Title	Writer(s)	Length
1.	"Fear of a Blank Planet"		7:28
2.	"My Ashes"	Wilson, Barbieri	5:07
3.	"Cheating the Polygraph"	Harrison, Wilson	7:10
Total length:			19:43

Side two

No.	Title	Length
1.	"Anesthetize" (Alex Lifeson – lead guitar)	17:46

Side three

No.	Title	Writer(s)	Length
1.	"Sentimental"		5:26
2.	"Way Out of Here" (Robert Fripp – soundscapes)	Wilson, Barbieri, Edwin, Harrison	7:37
3.	"Sleep Together"		7:28
Total length:			20:31

Side four

No.	Title	Writer(s)	Length
1.	"Nil Recurring" (Gavin Harrison – taped guitar; Robert Fripp – lead guitar)	Harrison, Edwin, Barbieri, Wilson	6:08
2.	"Normal"		7:09
3.	"What Happens Now?" (Ben Coleman – electric violin)	Wilson, Barbieri, Edwin, Harrison	8:23
Total length:			21:40

DVD-A edition

A Grammy nominated special limited edition audiophile 5.1 Surround Sound version released on the band's own Transmission label, featuring the 5.1 mix of the album in advanced resolution/MLP lossless 5.1 surround, DTS 5.1 digital surround sound, and 24 bit stereo, as well as all 4 tracks from the Nil Recurring mini album in surround sound. The disc also includes three video works directed by Lasse Hoile: a special Blank Planet Introduction short film, the uncensored version of the "Fear of a Blank Planet" promo video, and the full length 17-minute film for "Anesthetize" as seen during the band's live shows.

Audio content

All music is composed by Steven Wilson, except where noted.

No.	Title	Music	Featuring	Length
1.	"Fear of a Blank Planet"			7:28
2.	"My Ashes"	Richard Barbieri		5:07
3.	"Anesthetize"		Alex Lifeson – guitar solo	17:42
4.	"Sentimental"			5:26
5.	"Way Out of Here"	Porcupine Tree	Robert Fripp – soundscapes	7:37
6.	"Sleep Together"			7:28
7.	"Nil Recurring" (5.1 only)	Porcupine Tree	Robert Fripp – lead guitar	6:08
8.	"Normal" (5.1 only)			7:07
9.	"Cheating the Polygraph" (5.1 only)	Gavin Harrison		7:06
10.	"What Happens Now?" (5.1 only)	Porcupine Tree	Ben Coleman – electric violin	8:23
Total length:				79:32

Video material

No.	Title	Contributor	Length
1.	"Blank Planet" (Short film)		5:03
2.	"Fear of a Blank Planet" (Uncensored promo video)		4:56
3.	"Anesthetize" (Live film)	Grant Wakefield – Additional digital time-lapse footage	17:13
Total length:			27:12

== Personnel ==
Porcupine Tree

- Steven Wilson – vocals, guitars, piano, keyboards
- Richard Barbieri – keyboards and synthesizers
- Colin Edwin – bass guitars
- Gavin Harrison – drums

Additional musicians

- Alex Lifeson – guitar solo on "Anesthetize"
- Robert Fripp – soundscapes on "Way Out of Here"
- John Wesley – backing vocals
- London Session Orchestra – orchestra

Production

- Porcupine Tree – producers
- Steven Wilson – mixing, audio mastering, string arrangements
- Dave Stewart – string arrangements
- Steve Price – engineer
- Lasse Hoile – photography

== Charts ==
Chart performance for Fear of a Blank Planet
Chart (2007)	Peak position
Australian Albums (ARIA)	66
Dutch Albums (Album Top 100)	13
Finnish Albums (Suomen virallinen lista)	16
French Albums (SNEP)	70
German Albums (Offizielle Top 100)	21
Italian Albums (FIMI)	34
Norwegian Albums (VG-lista)	34
Polish Albums (ZPAV)	16
Swedish Albums (Sverigetopplistan)	38
Swiss Albums (Schweizer Hitparade)	41
UK Albums (Official Charts)	31
US Billboard 200	59
US Billboard Top Internet Albums	3
US Billboard Top Rock Albums	17

== Release history ==
Region	Date	Label	Format
Europe	16 April 2007	Roadrunner Records	CD, CD+DVD-V
United States	24 April 2007	Atlantic Records	CD, CD+DVD-V
Japan	25 April 2007	WHD	CD, CD+DVD-V
Canada	1 May 2007	WEA	CD
Worldwide	25 September 2007	Tonefloat Records	Double LP
Worldwide	3 October 2007	Transmission	DVD-A
