= Gavin Harrison =

English drummer (born 1963)

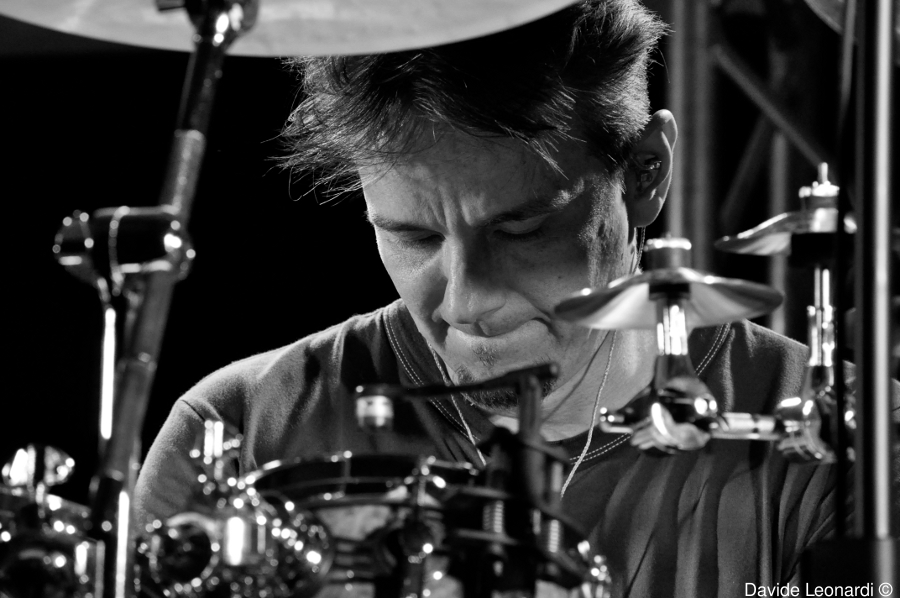
- Harrison in 2011

Background information
- Born: 28 May 1963 (age 63); Harrow, Middlesex, England
- Genres: Progressive rock; jazz rock; experimental rock
- Occupation: Musician
- Instruments: Drums; percussion
- Years active: 1979–present
- Labels: Lava; Roadrunner; Atlantic; Kscope
- Member of: Porcupine Tree; The Pineapple Thief
- Formerly of: Level 42; King Crimson
- Website: gavharrison.com

Gavin Richard Harrison (born 28 May 1963) is an English musician. He is best known for his long tenures with the progressive rock bands Porcupine Tree (2002–2010; 2021–present), King Crimson (2008; 2013–2021) and The Pineapple Thief (2016–present). Harrison's drumming has received many awards from music publications and earned praise from other musicians.

== Career ==
Gavin started to work professionally in 1979. He worked as a freelance session drummer on records and tours for the following artists: Incognito, Lisa Stansfield, Lewis Taylor, Artful Dodger, Paul Young, Iggy Pop, Level 42, Porcupine Tree, OSI, King Crimson, Shooter, Dizrhythmia, The Pineapple Thief, The Kings Of Oblivion, Sam Brown, Tom Robinson, Go West, Black, Gail Ann Dorsey, B.J. Cole, Dave Stewart and Barbara Gaskin, Nathan East, Yasuaki Shimizu, Camouflage, Kevin Ayers, Claudio Baglioni, Franco Battiato, Chizuko Yoshihiro, Renaissance (1983-4), Mick Karn, Eros Ramazzotti, Nick Johnston, Randy Goodrum, and Fates Warning.

In 2002, he joined Porcupine Tree and has played on the band's albums released since that time: In Absentia, Deadwing, Fear of a Blank Planet, The Incident, and Closure/Continuation, with each receiving critical acclaim and raising the band's status to one of the most influential modern progressive rock bands. He remained a permanent member of the band until an indefinite hiatus was announced in 2010, and then again in 2021 when the band announced a return to playing together with the release of the album Closure/Continuation.

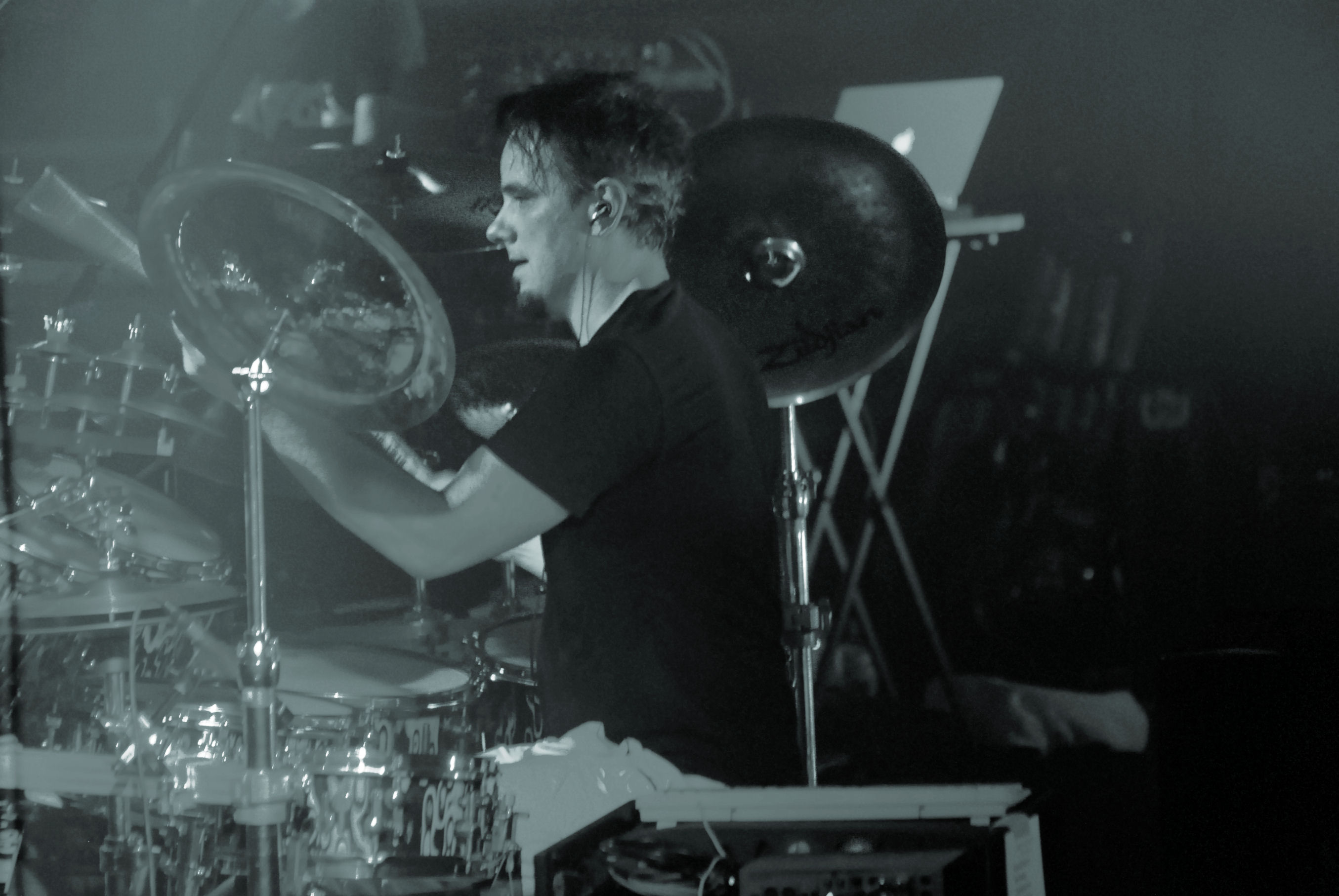
Harrison with Porcupine Tree during concert in Kraków, 2007

In 2007, Harrison began a long-term collaboration with singer/extended range bass player 05Ric, which led to the release of three CDs, Drop (2007), Circles (2009) and The Man Who Sold Himself (2012).

In 2008, Harrison joined King Crimson as part of a dual-drummer line-up with Pat Mastelotto. He played a number of shows in the United States in August with the band. He also recorded drums on Steven Wilson's debut solo album, Insurgentes.

On 23 August 2011, he was a featured performer on the 'Late Show with David Letterman' as part of their second "Drum Solo Week", along with such players as Sheila E, Stewart Copeland, Neil Peart, and Dennis Chambers.

From September 2014 to December 2021, Harrison played live in King Crimson as one of the three drummers.

In 2016, he joined The Pineapple Thief as a session drummer for the band's 11th studio album Your Wilderness, which received widespread critical acclaim and an overwhelmingly positive fan reception. He joined the band on the tour following the album in January 2017. In August 2018, just prior to the release of Dissolution, the band announced that Harrison had officially joined the band as a full member. He has since been actively involved and credited in the band's songwriting and album production together with the founder Bruce Soord.

== Influences and awards ==
Harrison was influenced by his father's jazz collection and by drummers such as Steve Gadd and Jeff Porcaro.

Harrison won the Modern Drummer readers' poll for "best progressive drummer of the year" consecutively from 2007 to 2010 and again in 2016 and 2019. He won "Best Prog Drummer" in DRUM USA magazine 2011. Prog voted him best drummer in 2011 and 2012, and six years in a row from 2018-2024. He is the featured cover story on Modern Drummer January 2009, February 2015 and July 2022. Rolling Stone polls rate him as the third best drummer in the past 25 years. In 2014, Modern Drummer magazine placed Harrison in the "Top 50 Greatest Drummers of All Time".

== Comments from other artists ==
Many artists have cited Harrison as an influence, including Chad Szeliga, Chris Pennie, Ryan Van Poederooyen, Dirk Verbeuren, Andrew Spence, Raymond Hearne of Haken, John Merryman of Cephalic Carnage, Jamie Saint Merat of Ulcerate, Aaron Stechauner of Rings of Saturn, Baard Kolstad of Leprous, Francesco Paoli of Fleshgod Apocalypse, Matija Dagović of Consecration, Vishnu Reddy of Crypted and Abhay Rathore (former Mocaine).

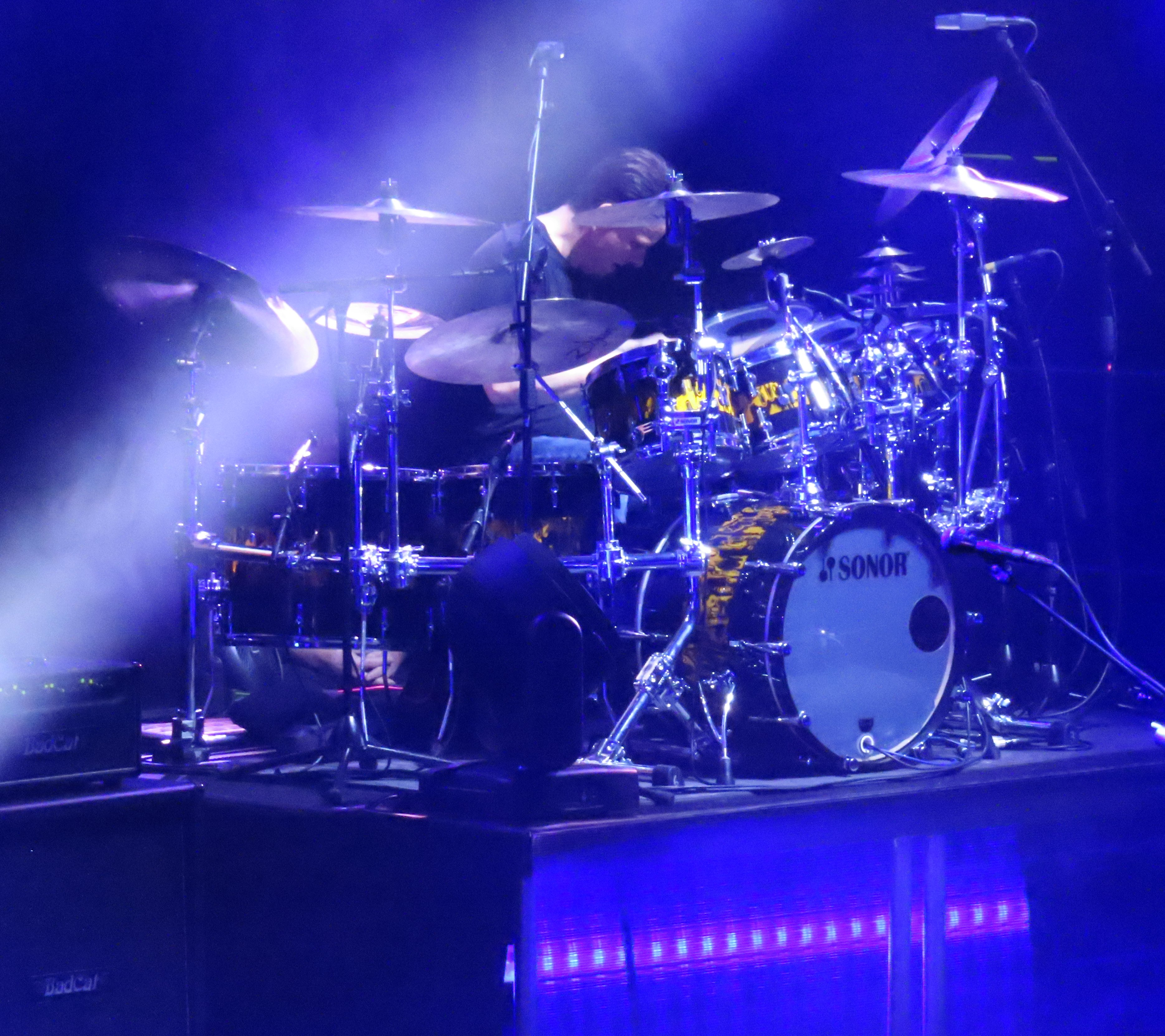
Harrison performing with Porcupine Tree in 2022.

In addition, other artists have been quoted expressing admiration for his work including Neil Peart, Bill Bruford, Mike Portnoy, Devin Townsend, Steve Smith, Martín López, Matt Garstka, Dave Bainbridge, Hannes Grossmann, Blake Richardson, Kai Hahto, Jimmy Keegan, Ian Mosley, Dan Presland of Ne Obliviscaris, Evan Sammons of Last Chance to Reason, Bodo Stricker of Callejon, Joshua Theriot of Abigail's Ghost, and Blake Anderson of Vektor.

== Publications ==
Harrison authored two instructional drum books entitled Rhythmic Illusions and Rhythmic Perspectives. He also wrote and produced his own instructional DVDs, Rhythmic Visions and Rhythmic Horizons, at his home studio. 2010 saw the release of Rhythmic Designs, a book of transcriptions by Terry Branam, and a 3-hour DVD of Gavin's explanations and demonstrations. It won 'Best in Show' at the summer NAMM Show in the USA. 2014 sees the release of Rhythmic Compositions, a book of 20 detailed drum transcriptions (by Terry Branam) of recorded Porcupine Tree performances – plus photos and stories of the recording and creative process.

== Discography ==
Performer	Year	Album
The Pineapple Thief	2026	Far and Wide
Harrison / Johnston	2025	Early Mercy
Jakko Jakszyk	2025	Son Of Glen
The Pineapple Thief	2024	Last To Run
The Pineapple Thief	2024	It Leads to This
Gavin Harrison & Antoine Fafard	2024	Perpetual Mutations
Saro Cosentino	2022	The Road to Now
Gleb Kolyadin	2022	The Outland
The Pineapple Thief	2022	Give It Back
King Crimson	2021	Washington & Albany
The Pineapple Thief	2021	Uncovering the Tracks
The Pineapple Thief	2021	Nothing but the Truth - Live
Tuesday The Sky	2021	The Blurred Horizon
Gavin Harrison & Antoine Fafard	2020	Chemical Reactions
Fates Warning	2020	Long Day Good Night
Claudio Baglioni	2020	In questa storia, che è le mia
The Pineapple Thief	2020	Versions of the Truth
Randy Goodrum	2020	Red Eye
Jakko Jakszyk	2020	Secrets and Lies
The Pineapple Thief	2019	Hold Our Fire - Live
The Pineapple Thief	2018	Dissolution
Dave Stewart & Barbara Gaskin	2018	Star Clocks
King Crimson	2017	Meltdown: Live in Mexico City
Gianluca D'Alessio	2018	Sunrise Markets
Gleb Kolyadin	2018	Gleb Kolyadin
King Crimson	2016	Live In Vienna
The Pineapple Thief	2017	Where We Stood
King Crimson	2017	Live in Chicago
King Crimson	2016	Radical Action to Unseat the Hold of Monkey Mind
Dizrhythmia	2016	Dizrhythmia Too
The Pineapple Thief	2016	Your Wilderness
Nick Johnston	2016	Remarkably Human
King Crimson	2016	Live in Toronto
Fjieri	2016	Words Are All We Have
iamthemorning	2016	Lighthouse
Franco Battiato	2015	Anthology - Le nostre anime
King Crimson	2015	Live at the Orpheum
Carlo Berton	2015	Planetarium
iamthemorning	2014	Belighted
King Crimson	2014	The Elements of King Crimson
Amadeus Awad	2013	Schizanimus
The Tangent	2013	Le Sacre du Travail
Lo-Fi Resistance	2012	Chalk Lines
Porcupine Tree	2012	Octane Twisted
Fusion Syndicate	2012	The Fusion Syndicate
Franco Battiato	2012	Apriti sesamo
Kompendium	2012	Beneath the Waves
Harry Shearer	2012	Can't Take a Hint
Ed Poole	2012	Routes
Dario Zeno	2010	L'incoscienza di Zeno
Alberto Rigioni	2011	Rebirth
Alice	1992	Mezzogiorno sulle Alpi
Angela Baraldi	2001	Rosasporco
B. J. Cole	1989	Transparent Music
B. J. Cole	1995	Heart of the Moment
Black	1988	Comedy
Blackfield	2004	Blackfield
Blackfield	2007	Blackfield II
Camouflage	1991	Meanwhile
Carlo Fimiani	2007	Too Early
Chizuko Yoshihiro	1993	Conscious Mind
Claudio Baglioni	1992	AncorAssieme
Claudio Baglioni	1992	Assieme
Claudio Baglioni	1995	Io sono qui
Claudio Baglioni	1996	Attori e spettatori
Claudio Baglioni	1997	Anime in gioco
Claudio Baglioni	1998	A-Live
Claudio Baglioni	1999	Viaggiatore sulla coda del tempo
Claudio Baglioni	2000	Acustico
Claudio Baglioni	2003	Sono io
Claudio Baglioni	2005	Cresendo e Cercando
Claudio Baglioni	2006	Quelli degli altri tutti qui
Claudio Baglioni	2009	Q.P.G.A
Claudio Baglioni	2013	Con voi
Dave Stewart & Barbara Gaskin	1990	The Big Idea
Dave Stewart & Barbara Gaskin	1991	Spin
Dave Stewart & Barbara Gaskin	2009	Green & Blue
Dave Stewart & Barbara Gaskin	2009	TLG Collection
David Devant & His Spirit Wife	1996	Ginger
Devogue	1997	Devogue
Dizrhythmia	1987	Dizrhythmia
Donna Gardier	1990	I'll Be There
Ed Poole	2008	ED 4
Ed Poole	2010	Depth
Eugenio Finardi	1990	La forza dell'amore
Eugenio Finardi	1991	Millennio
Fiorella Mannoia	1992	I treni a vapore
Peter Cox	2004	Desert Blooms
Franco Battiato	1993	Caffè de la Paix
Franco Battiato	1996	L'imboscata
Franco Battiato	1998	Gommalacca
Franco Battiato	2012	Apriti sesamo
Froon	1987	Froon
Fjieri	2009	Endless
Gail Ann Dorsey	1988	The Corporate World
Gavin Harrison	1997	Sanity & Gravity
Gavin Harrison & 05Ric	2007	Drop
Gavin Harrison & 05Ric	2009	Circles
Gavin Harrison & 05Ric	2012	The Man Who Sold Himself
Gavin Harrison	2015	Cheating the Polygraph
Heraldo Zuniga	2001	Triangulo de Musgo
Iggy Pop	1986	Ritz N.Y.C Live / Real Wild Child Live
Incognito	1991	Inside Life
Jakko Jakszyk	2006	The Bruised Romantic Glee Club
Jakko Jakszyk	1994	Kingdom of Dust
Jakko Jakszyk	1994	Mustard Gas and Roses
Jakko Jakszyk	1996	Are My Ears on Wrong?
Jakko Jakszyk	1997	Road to Ballina
Jakszyk Fripp Collins	2011	A Scarcity of Miracles
Kevin Ayers	1992	Still Life with Guitar
King Crimson	2008	Park West, Chicago, Illinois – 7 August 2008
Lene Lovich	1990	March
Lewis Taylor	2000	Lewis II
Lewis Taylor	2005	In Session
Lisa Stansfield	1997	Never, Never Gonna Give You Up (Live)
Lisa Stansfield	1999	Swing – Original Motion Picture Soundtrack
Manfred Mann's Earth Band	1996	Soft Vengeance
Manolo García	2002	Nunca el Tiempo es Perdido
Marco Tafelli	2010	Reset
Mick Karn	1995	The Tooth Mother
Mieko Shimizu	1990	A Road of Shells
Miss Thi	1991	Lover
No-Man	2008	Schoolyard Ghosts
OSI	2009	Blood
OSI	2012	Fire Make Thunder
Paolo Gianolio	2009	Pane e nuvole
Paolo Gianolio	2012	Tribù di Note
Patty Pravo	2002	Radio Station
Paul Cusick	2011	P'dice
Paul Young	1995	Grazing in the Grass Live
Peter Cox	2001	Flame Still Burns
Porcupine Tree	2002	In Absentia
Porcupine Tree	2003	Futile
Porcupine Tree	2003	XM
Porcupine Tree	2004	The Sky Moves Sideways reissue
Porcupine Tree	2005	Deadwing
Porcupine Tree	2005	Up the Downstair reissue
Porcupine Tree	2005	XMII
Porcupine Tree	2006	Rockpalast
Porcupine Tree	2006	Arriving Somewhere...
Porcupine Tree	2007	Fear of a Blank Planet
Porcupine Tree	2007	Nil Recurring
Porcupine Tree	2009	Ilosaarirock
Porcupine Tree	2009	The Incident
Porcupine Tree	2010	Anesthetize
Porcupine Tree	2010	Atlanta
Porcupine Tree	2022	Closure/Continuation
Progetto Cavani	1993	Alza la testa
Raf	1993	Cannibali
Richard Barbieri/Tim Bowness	1994	Flame
Richard Barbieri	2008	Stranger Inside
Rob Cowen/Beverley Craven	2004	Lady Advertiser
Sam Brown	1987	Stop!
Sarah Jane Morris	1988	Can't Get to Sleep
Saro Cosentino	1997	Ones & Zeros
Shari Belafonte	1989	Shari
Sharon Rose	1994	Never Be the Same
Sheila Nicholls	2002	Wake
Shooter	1999	...And Your Point?
Shooter	1999	Life's a Bitch
Stefano Panunzi	2005	Timelines
Steve Thorne	2007	Part Two: Emotional Creatures
Steve Thorne	2009	Into the Ether
Steven Wilson	2008	Insurgentes
Storm Corrosion	2012	Storm Corrosion
The Kings of Oblivion	1987	Big Fish Popcorn
Three Blind Mice	2007	Good Grief
Tom Robinson & Jakko Jakszyk	1988	We've Never Had It So Good
Yasuaki Shimizu	1989	Aduna
Zerra One	1986	The Domino Effect

== See also ==
- List of drummers
- List of jazz drummers
