= Kscope =

UK record label and sub-label of Snapper Music

- Parent company: Snapper Music
- Founded: 1999 (re-established in May 2008)
- Distributor: Snapper Music
- Genre: Progressive rock, post-progressive, alternative rock, art rock, psychedelic rock, experimental rock
- Country of origin: England
- Location: London
- Official website: kscopemusic.com

Kscope is an independent record label that is part of Snapper Music, and a sister-label of Peaceville. It is dedicated to artists in the progressive rock genre. The label has released albums by Steven Wilson and his projects Porcupine Tree (mostly re-issue only), No-Man and Blackfield. In 2008 it branched out and has since signed the post-progressive artists Anathema, Lunatic Soul and Ulver, and progressive rock stalwart Ian Anderson to their roster. In 2013, the Steven Wilson release The Raven That Refused to Sing (and Other Stories) received the Album of the Year award at the Progressive Music Awards.

== History ==
Established in the late 1990s, the label was initially used exclusively by Wilson and Porcupine Tree. In this first incarnation, Kscope was featured as an outlet for the 1999 album Stupid Dream, with Snapper Music as the distributor. It was followed by Lightbulb Sun in 2000 and a collection of left-over material Recordings. After the band signed up with Atlantic Records in 2002, the name was used for Wilson's side projects. This included the albums Together We're Stranger (2003) and the re-issue of the Flowermouth (2005) by No-Man. It also released Blackfield (2004) and Blackfield II (2007)—a collaboration with Aviv Geffen.

When Snapper Music acquired the earlier Porcupine Tree recordings from Delerium Records in 2006, a re-release programme was rolled out. At the same time, talks began to expand the remit of the label, and Wilson suggested to "have [it] for releasing only new music. Just go after some of these [post progressive] bands and model yourselves on those old ’70s labels, like Harvest and Vertigo, [who] would allow artists to develop both musically and with a fan base over a period of albums”. As a result, Snapper music remodeled Kscope to focus on post-progressive music, with Wilson actively involved with the acts that were signed.

One of the label's earliest signings was The Pineapple Thief after its frontman Bruce Soord was contacted by Wilson. The first release was the Tightly Unwound album that received the catalogue number 101. Within two years Kscope built up its roster with Johnny Wilks commenting that by this stage "the label had really got going and we were working with Engineers, Gazpacho & Steven Wilson. I really felt we were establishing ourselves as a label". At the same time, Kscope continued to release Wilson-related material, including Schoolyard Ghosts by No-Man on 12 May 2008. A number of re-releases included the first solo album, Things Buried, by Richard Barbieri in 2007. In 2008 the band Anathema made their debut on the label with album Hindsight, while Lunatic Soul from Poland and the Italian band Nosound were added to the roster.

The label packages their albums in elaborate digibooks, super jewel cases or digipacks with additional DVD material, like the Steven Wilson solo album Insurgentes (2009), which included a documentary and a DVD-Audio option. Another prominent release was We’re Here Because We’re Here by Anathema.

In 2013, the label celebrated its fifth anniversary with two concerts in London, headlined by Amplifier and Anathema. In April 2014 the label released the Homo Erraticus album by Ian Anderson, which reached #14 in the UK album chart.

Kscope have a monthly podcast hosted by Billy Reeves, which features new music and interviews from artists on the label.

== Signed artists ==
- Amplifier
- Anathema
- The Anchoress
- Ian Anderson
- Anekdoten
- Richard Barbieri
- Blackfield
- Paul Draper
- Engineers
- Envy of None
- Henry Fool
- Gavin Harrison & 05Ric
- Gazpacho
- Godsticks
- Gong
- Steve Hogarth
- Iamthemorning
- Ihlo
- Steve Jansen
- Katatonia
- Leafblade
- Lunatic Soul
- Mick Karn
- Mothlite
- No-Man
- Nordic Giants
- North Atlantic Oscillation
- Nosound
- O.R.k.
- Old Fire (John Mark Lapham)
- Ozric Tentacles
- Paul Draper
- Porcupine Tree (1999–2001)
- Se Delan
- Sweet Billy Pilgrim
- The Receiver
- Tangerine Dream
- TesseracT
- The Pineapple Thief (including Bruce Soord (solo) and Wisdom of Crowds)
- Ulver
- White Moth Black Butterfly
- Steven Wilson (2009–2016)

== See also ==
- List of record labels
