= RareNoiseRecords =

- Founded: 2008
- Founder: Giacomo Bruzzo; Eraldo Bernocchi
- Distributors: Cargo (UK); AMPED Distribution (US); Cargo (Germany); Goodfellas (Italy); DifferAnt (France)
- Genre: Dub; free jazz; jazz-rock; avant rock; free improvisation; avant-garde metal; noise; post-rock; ambient music; electroacoustic music
- Country of origin: United Kingdom
- Location: London
- Official website: www.rarenoiserecords.com

RareNoiseRecords is an independent record label based in London, co-founded by Italian entrepreneur Giacomo Bruzzo and Italian musician and producer Eraldo Bernocchi in 2008. The label's mission is to detect and amplify contemporary trends in progressive music, by highlighting their relation to the history of the art-form, while choosing not to be bound by pre-conceptions of genre. It seeks to become a guiding light for all those enamored by exciting, adventurous and progressive sounds. In 2020, Bruzzo described his preferences in music for the label: "I like music that gives me a sense of vertigo, like I'm half a second away from the cliff's edge".

The label released its first albums in 2009. Musicians who have worked frequently with RareNoise include Eraldo Bernocchi, Lorenzo Feliciati, Lorenzo Esposito Fornasari, Colin Edwin, Cuong Vu, Jamie Saft, Bill Laswell, Joe Morris, Balázs Pándi, Roy Powell, and Pat Mastelotto. RareNoise offers a subscription service, allowing customers to pay for one year's releases in advance.

== Artists ==
- Mark Aanderud
- Animation
- Bob Belden
- Eraldo Bernocchi
- Brainkiller
- Harold Budd
- Chat Noir
- Death Cube K
- Trevor Dunn
- Colin Edwin
- Lorenzo Feliciati
- Lorenzo Esposito Fornasari
- Free Nelson Mandoomjazz
- David Fiuczynski
- Martin France
- Gaudi
- Mats Gustafsson
- Robin Guthrie
- Keiji Haino
- Graham Haynes
- Hernan Hecht
- Bill Laswell
- Led Bib
- The Mantra Above the Spotless Melt Moon
- Pat Mastelotto
- Meditronica
- Merzbow
- Metallic Taste of Blood
- Method of Defiance
- Nils Petter Molvær
- Joe Morris
- Kjetil Møster
- Naked Truth
- New Zion Trio
- Obake
- Balázs Pándi
- Roy Powell
- Roswell Rudd
- Jamie Saft
- J. Peter Schwalm
- Slobber Pup
- Wadada Leo Smith
- Stomu Takeishi
- Cuong Vu
- WorldService Project
- Bernie Worrell
