= Eraldo Bernocchi =

Italian musician and producer (born 1963)

- Born: October 21, 1963; Milan, Italy
- Genres: Avant-garde rock, art rock, ambient, dub, electronic, experimental
- Occupation(s): Musician, record producer, arranger
- Instrument: Guitar
- Years active: 1980s–present
- Labels: RareNoise
- Website: eraldobernocchi.com

Eraldo Bernocchi (born October 21, 1963, in Milan, Italy) is an Italian guitarist, producer, and sound designer.

== History ==
After attending the exclusive high school Scuola Europa and the State University of Milan at the Faculty of Law for three years, he began working for a company of electronic engineers that designed advanced systems and installations of maximum safety for the Italian government. Eraldo Bernocchi started his career as a guitarist in independent punk bands in the late 1970s. In the mid 1980s, together with Paolo Bandera and Luca di Giorgio, Eraldo co-founded the conceptual audio project Sigillum-S, which grew into a highly acclaimed international cult act and remains the longest running project Bernocchi is involved with.

In the 90s, he and his wife, visual artist Petulia Mattioli, established Verba Corrige Productions, which became the base for a raft of notable audio visual projects and co-operations. During the 1990s and 2000s, he expanded his base of collaborators greatly, both within Italy and throughout the world. Some of these included Mick Harris (Harris releasing Bernocchi's SIMM debut on his own Possible Recs imprint and working with Black Engine as well as two collaborative albums under their names), Almamegretta, Balázs Pándi, Bill Laswell, Colin Edwin, DJ Disk, DJ Olive, Gaudi, Giovanni Lindo Ferretti, Harold Budd, Lorenzo Esposito Fornasari, Markus Stockhausen, Nils Petter Molvaer, Professor Shebab, Raiz, Robin Guthrie, Russell Mills, Sensational, Spectre, Thomas Fehlmann, Toshinori Kondo, and Zu (as Black Engine).

In addition to regular work scoring music for adverts and other multimedia projects, he has composed film music for Academy Award winner Gabriele Salvatores and produced numerous art installations with Petulia Mattioli, as well as other artists, including Russell Mills and Harold Budd.

He is known for being invited to play and organize several special events for the Dalai Lama in Italy.

In 2008, Bernocchi and music Giacomo Bruzzo founded RareNoiseRecords, a label based in London which aims to showcase a wide range of cutting-edge music. The label has since become an important conduit championing several forward thinking and original artists, as well as releasing a number of Eraldo's own recordings, including ambient guitar duo Parched (with Davide Tiso from Ephel Duath fame), Somma with Nils Petter Molvaer, Bill Laswell, Raiz and Lorenzo Esposito Fornasari), Owls (again with Fornasari and Tony Wakeford), Metallic Taste of Blood (with Colin Edwin from Porcupine Tree, Balázs Pándi and Jamie Saft) and Obake, a doomtronic quartet with Jason Konhen/Bong Ra on bass, Lorenzo Esposito Fornasari and Balázs Pándi.

== Notable projects ==
=== Sigillum S ===
The project Sigillum S was created on 23 December 1985. It has had, since the beginning, the aim to be totally against the logic of the "band". It was conceived as an open structure in which people could work and research different subjects.

Formed by Eraldo Bernocchi (guitars, electronic treatments, voice, and programmation) Paolo Bandera (electronic treatments, bass, and voice) and Luca Di Giorgio (keyboards), the project has always been a double faced creature, mixing together on the same level precise ritual and ethnic aspects with a noisy music.

Since the beginning, Sigillum S had as path to be followed the knowledge and the total war against any kind of limit or taboo, refusing any kind of relationship with political/religious structures. During the first 10 years they toured quite extensively through all Europe and Canada, taking on stage a multimedia attack based on videos, slides and artworks used as a part of the stage.

Having pared down along the way to consist of only Eraldo and Paolo as core members, they collaborated with different groups in different situations, like: Ain Soph, The Sodality, Gerstein, Iugula-Thor, Dive, Outoff Body Experience, Team Spam, the sculptor Milo Sacchi, the multimedia/artist PM.Koma and many others.

After a slew of releases through their first 15 years, they released the album Abstraction on Daft Records. This proved to be their last release for a number of years. In 2007, Verba Corrige announced the completion of 23|20, a celebration of the history of Sigillum S. The release was done in two different formats (Digipak CD and gatefold vinyl) featuring different track lists and sequences for each. The release featured all new material and collaborations with artists such as Toshinori Kondo, Bill Laswell, SH Fernando/WordSound, Prof. Shehab/Baboon Records, Martino Nicoletti, Lorenzo Esposito Fornasari, the band Zu, Xabier Iriondo, Ephel Duath, various members of Crisis, Mark Solotroff, Thomas Fehlmann, Gudrun Gut, Andrea Marutti, Claudio Agostoni, and many others.

Since the release of 23|20 Sigillum S has continued to perform live, welcoming Luca Di Giorgio back into the fold and adding Petulia Mattioli as a fourth member. Much of their back catalog is now available through Bandcamp with new recordings and archival material forthcoming, both in physical and digital mediums.

=== Ashes ===
Ashes was started in 1990 essentially as an Eraldo solo project. The basic idea was to produce works that would be out of context for Sigillum S, as Ashes was a very personal project based on a strong individual introspection. The first release was recorded between 1990 and 1992, finally being released on the newly founded Verba Corrige label. This release, entitled Ashland was based on the guitar treatments, which are often used as a mantra for newly born mind paths. 1996 saw Ashes grow beyond the context of a solo project to include the bass and production of Bill Laswell and vocals of Raiz from Italian group Almamegretta. After a silence of almost 10 years, the project returned with a new album called Unisono, expanding on the core trio to include contributions from Lorenzo Esposito Fornasari, Antonio Denti and Paolo Mongardi.

=== SIMM ===
SIMM is a beat and bass oriented project owing a debt to the sound of Mick Harris' Scorn project, whom Eraldo had played a batch of live shows with. The project released one full-length release on Mick Harris' short-lived Possible Recs label as well as a 12" on the same label. Additionally, the moniker provided some tracks for a few compilations from around the same time period. In 2012 it was announced that the long-awaited follow up to Welcome was announced for release by Vital Records. After some production delays and personal issues within the label, the release (Visitor) has now shifted to the OHM Resistance label and has been announced with a release date of October 31, 2013.

=== Somma ===
The Somma project was conceived by Petulia Mattioli and Eraldo Bernocchi. The concept behind Somma is the real interaction among different cultures with the aim to contaminate and explore ancient traditions connecting new electronic music and technology with jazz, dub, and mantric concepts.

Unlike several so called "world music" issues and experiments, Somma aims to have real interaction between different worlds, both sonically and visually. This approach rejects the traditional meaning of the moniker "world music" and avoids ethnic cliches, proposing that each event held be different, where participants will be building a sonic and visual ritual using both ancient and modern tools. Ranging from acoustic to electric to electronic, Somma aims for the creation of new rituals for a contemporary age, the interaction of the sacred and dub, a digital mantra for a new sacred ground.

Entirely improvised, every event/concert of Somma ties together two theoretically distant worlds using interaction between eastern and western musicians who look for a different concert/event for each performance. Tibetan culture is not at all used as a folkloristic or curious event, as too many times happens in the west, but as living part of the creative process. Visuals are also totally improvised and constructed in real time according to what is happening musically on stage to close the circle erasing any difference between past and future.

Since 1996 Bernocchi and Mattioli involved well known New York producer/bass legend Bill Laswell and start to work on the first studio recording of the combo together with 7 Tibetan monks. The album, Hooked Light Rays came out for Low Records, a division of Pete Namlook's Fax label, gaining positive reviews. In 1998 the album was reprinted by Felmay/New Tone an Italian label specialized in traditional/modern musics.

With the encouragement of Musica 90, one of the most renowned booking/production agencies in Europe, Somma's first public appearance took place on November 26, 1996, at Teatro Regio in Torino Italy in front of 1600 people.

Line-up:

- Eraldo Bernocchi - treated guitars and electronics
- Bill Laswell - bass
- Petulia Mattioli - stage design and visuals
- Oz Fritz - sound engineering and space dislocations
- 7 Tibetan monks - vocals, horns, bells, drums

In 2001, on occasion of the official visit of the Dalai lama, Somma performed in Trento at the Centro Santa Chiara theatre, in front of a gathering 2000 people.

Line-up:

- Eraldo Bernocchi - treated guitars and electronics
- Bill Laswell - bass
- Petulia Mattioli - stage design and visuals
- 7 Tibetan monks - vocals, horns, bells, drums
- Stefano Cecere - visual assistant
- Hamid Drake - drums
- Gigi - vocals
- Toshinori Kondo - trumpet
- Raiz - vocals
- Oz Fritz - sound engineering and space dislocations

This show was released as part of a limited edition deluxe package set in 2007 on Verba Corrige.

Somma continues to grow and expand, most recently playing on May 28, 2007, at Teatro Dal Verme in Milan adding Lorenzo Esposito Fornasari, Nils Petter Molvaer and the vocal group Faraualla to the mix. This show received release in 2010 through Eraldo's RareNoise label.

=== Obake ===
Obake is one of Bernocchi's newer ongoing projects, meant to be the place where the energies of Doom and Drone Metal fuse with ambient electronica, noise, the exactness of math-rock, the groove of blues undercurrents harking back to the dawn of hard-rock and the fluid lyrical delivery and musings of a commanding operatic voice. The initial release on RareNoise consisted of Eraldo Bernocchi and Lorenzo Esposito Fornasari, Massimo Pupillo of the group Zu on bass and drummer Balazs Pandi. After some internal shifting (including a short tour with Trevor Dunn (Mr. Bungle, Secret Chiefs 3) filling in on bass, new member Jason Köhnen of Bong-Ra fame was announced in 2013 as the permanent bassist with new recordings commencing this year.

=== Equations of Eternity ===
Equations of Eternity is an ambient dub music project started in 1995 that was started by Bernocchi. In addition to Bernocchi, its nucleus comprises musicians Bill Laswell and Mick Harris. Since its members live in separate parts of the world: Mick Harris in England; Bill Laswell in the US; and Eraldo Bernocchi in Italy, the project has been predominantly studio-based, with its members recording music in their respective countries.

== RareNoiseRecords ==
In 2007/2008, it was announced that Eraldo and partner Giacomo Bruzzo created a new record label to be based out of the UK, called RareNoiseRecords. The label officially began releasing albums at the end of the first half of 2009. The initial slate of releases kicked off with the debut release of Meditronica – a project by Ashtech and Polcari which also featured the talents of Raiz, Eraldo Bernocchi and Dub Gabriel. Other releases through the end of 2009 include The Mantra ATSMM, a Method of Defiance live album and DVD from 2007 featuring the then line-up of Bill Laswell, Bernie Worrell, Dr. Israel, Toshinori Kondo and Guy Licata, the long-awaited Buckethead side project Death Cube K's Torn From Black Space and Parched, an atmospheric guitar project from Eraldo and Davide Tiso.

As 2010 opened, a live recording of a 2007 show from Somma (held back from 2009 due to perfecting artwork issues) was released and the label released albums and/or EPs by Italian groups Echo and The Mantra ATSMM.

Over the last 2 years the label has expanded its artist and release base, with critically acclaimed releases from Eraldo related groups such as electronica/neo-folk project OWLS (with Tony Wakeford and Lorenzo Esposito Fornasari), Metallic Taste of Blood (Jamie Saft, Colin Edwin and Balazs Pandi) and Obake as well as Eraldo's collaboration with Harold Budd and Robin Guthrie. Aside from Eraldo projects, the label has also released albums by Brainkiller, Bob Belden's Animation, David Fiuczynski, Slobber Pup, InterStatic, Lorenzo Feliciati, Martin Schulte, Mole (Productions) and Naked Truth.
