= O.R.k. =

International rock band

- Origin: Australia, Italy, U.S.
- Genres: Alternative rock; art rock; progressive rock
- Years active: 2015–present
- Labels: Kscope; RareNoise
- Members: Colin Edwin; LEF; Pat Mastelotto; Carmelo Pipitone
- Website: orkband.com

O.R.k. are an international progressive, alternative, and art rock supergroup consisting of Australian bassist Colin Edwin (formerly of Porcupine Tree), American drummer Pat Mastelotto (King Crimson), Italian singer LEF (Obake), and Italian guitarist Carmelo Pipitone (Marta sui Tubi).

== History ==
The band was formed in 2014 and released its first single, "JellyFish", in January 2015. On 2 October of the same year, the band's debut studio album, Inflamed Rides, was independently published. To support the album, the band did around 30 shows in Europe and South America (Argentina, Chile and Mexico).

The band's second album, Soul of an Octopus, was published on 24 February 2017 by RareNoiseRecords. The album was promoted with dozen of concerts in Europe.

The band's third album, Ramagehead, was published on 22 February 2019 by the label Kscope. The album features the vocals of System of a Down frontman Serj Tankian on the song "Black Blooms". The group began their European tour in support of the album at the beginning of 2020, which was supposed to be followed by a tour in support of System Of A Down that was later canceled due to the Covid pandemic.

On 21 October 2022 the band released its fourth album, Screamnasium, still through the Kscope label. The album also features Italian singer Elisa as a guest vocalist on the song "Consequence". The band started touring Europe in support of the album in April 2023.

The art for the albums Ramagehead and Screamnasium were created by Tool’s guitarist Adam Jones.

== Discography ==
=== Studio Albums ===
| Year | Title | Label |
|---|---|---|
| 2015 | Inflamed Rides | Hard World |
| 2017 | Soul of an Octopus | RareNoiseRecords |
| 2019 | Ramagehead | Kscope |
| 2022 | Screamnasium | Kscope |
| 2025 | Firehose Of Falsehoods | Kscope |

=== Music Videos ===
- Pyre (2015)
- Collapsing Hopes (2017)
- Till The Sunrise Comes (2017)
- I'm Afraid of Americans (2017)
- Kneel To Nothing (2019)
- Black Bloom (2019)
- As I Leave (2022)
- Consequence (2023)
- Deadly Bite (2023)
- Blast of Silence (2024)
- PUTFP (2024)
- Mask Becomes the Face (2024)
