= Lorenzo Esposito Fornasari =

LEF
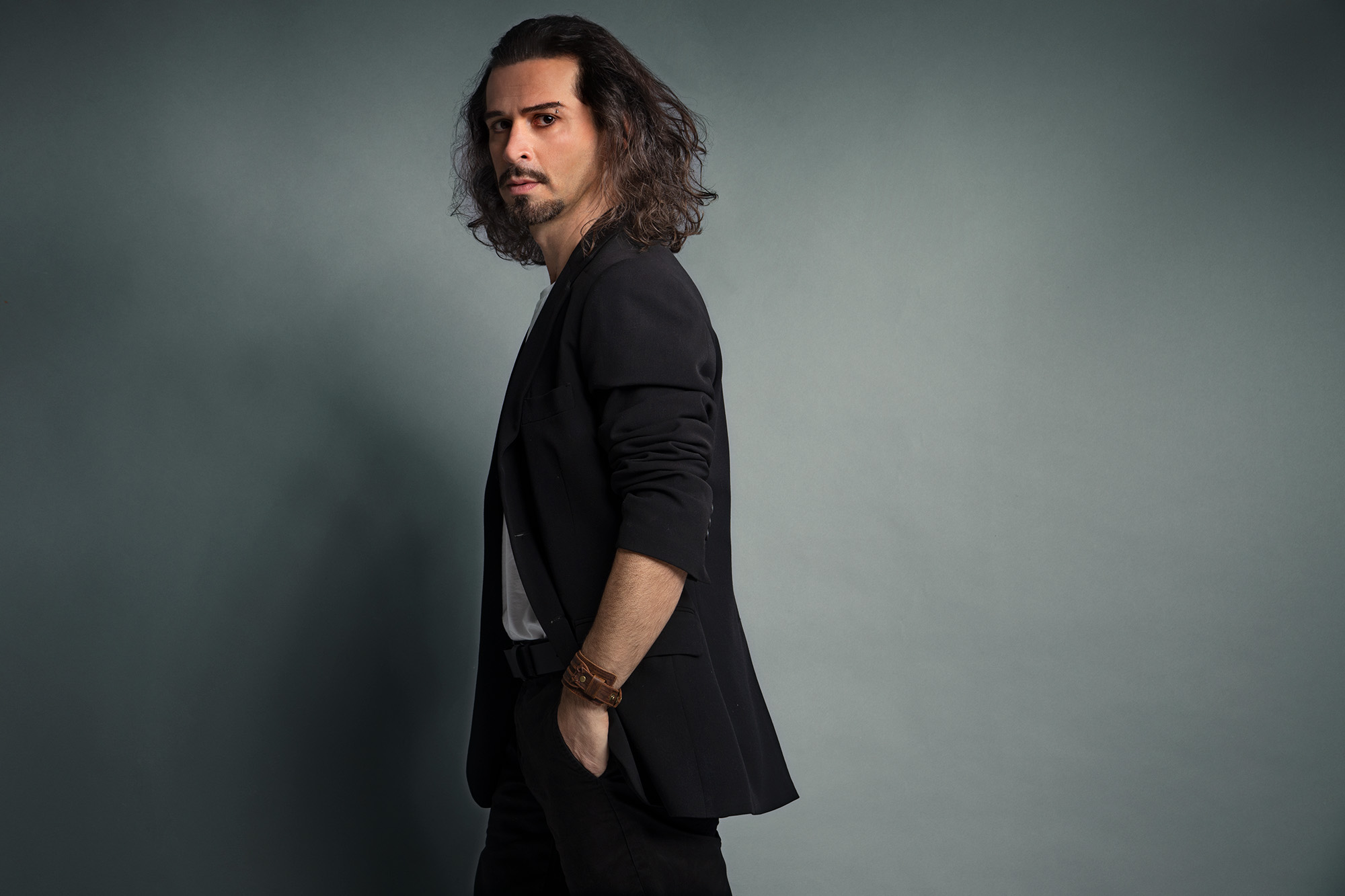
- Lorenzo Esposito Fornasari by Bruna Rotunno

Background information
- Born: Lorenzo Esposito Fornasari; 20 November 1977 (age 48); Bologna, Italy
- Genres: rock, experimental rock, jazz, classical
- Occupations: Singer, composer, producer
- Years active: 2000–present
- Website: www.lefmusic.com

LEF (born Lorenzo Esposito Fornasari; 20 November 1977) is an Italian vocalist, record producer and film score composer. He has worked with Bill Laswell, Lisa Gerrard, Serj Tankian from System of a Down, Elisa, Ben Harper, Hamid Drake, Nils Petter Molvær, Eivind Aarset, Jamie Saft, Pat Mastelotto from King Crimson, Eraldo Bernocchi, Colin Edwin from Porcupine Tree, Markus Stockhausen, Kenneth Kapstad from Motorpsycho, Tony Wakeford, Trevor Dunn, Giovanni Lindo Ferretti, Raiz, Ambrogio Sparagna, Faraualla, Enrico Gabrielli, Sigillum S, Ephel Duath, Gianluca Petrella, Fabrizio Puglisi, Ståle Storlokken and Carmelo Pipitone.

== History ==
Singer-composer Lorenzo Esposito Fornasari has made his mark as a singer and producer through a series of releases, including Obake's Draugr, Seven Mutations and their 2011 self-titled debut, Owls’ The Night Stays, O.R.k.'s Inflamed Rides, Soul of an Octopus and Ramagehead, Somma's 23 Wheels of Dharma and Berserk's 2013 self-titled debut.

Fornasari’s vocals are astonishing powerful, morphing between an urbane Sylvian-like drawl to a cracked-gravel growl oozing with a creeping malevolence. That theatrically evokes the dystopian pronouncements interleaving Bowie’s Outside. — Sid Smith, PROG magazine UK

Over the last decade, LEF performed in prestigious festivals and theatre stages worldwide including the Wave-Gotik-Treffen in Leipzig with the band Owls (Tony Wakeford, Eraldo Bernocchi, Lef), Asymmetry Festival in Poland with the band Obake, Teatro Vittoria in Roma with Giovanni Lindo Ferretti, the Teatro Grande in Brescia, the Cappella Paolina del Quirinale, the Teatro di Correggio, the Teatro Comunale Modena, Piazza Santo Stefano in Bologna, the Teatro Piccolo Regio in Turin, and the Teatro Dal Verme di Milano with Somma, as well as venues like the Teatro Comunale di Bologna and the Teatro Comunale in Ferrara singing contemporary opera.

In 2004 he started working with Eraldo Bernocchi, with whom he produced the album Unisono in collaboration with Bill Laswell. During the same year, Fornasari gave birth to the Vaga L’Am project with Quintorigo, Giovanni Lindo Ferretti, Enrico Gabrielli and Transgender. In 2007 he took part in the Somma project with Eraldo Bernocchi, Bill Laswell, Raiz, Hamid Drake, Nils Petter Molvær, Faraualla and seven Tibetan Monks. In 2008, again with Eraldo Bernocchi, he co-produced the remix album for Ephel Duath, Pain Remixes the Known. In 2009 he wrote soundtracks for "La torre riflette", a video installation on the Due Torri in Bologna. In the same year he produced Costituto, a 700th year celebration album for the Costituto of Siena, with Bernocchi, Markus Stockhausen and Giovanni Lindo Ferretti. In 2010 he disclosed an approach to the bel canto as he made his debut in Nino Rota's Il Principe Porcaro opera at the Teatro Comunale in Ferrara. Finally and more recently, Fornasari is a member of the trio Owls, with Eraldo Bernocchi and Tony Wakeford, which played their opening concert at the Wave-Gotik-Treffen in Leipzig in 2011. In 2012 he won the Genova Film Festival music award for his Cose Naturali soundtracks. Fornasari is also a member of Obake with Bernocchi, Massimo Pupillo and Balázs Pándi. In 2012 Trevor Dunn was on tour with the band, subbing for Pupillo. Obake is 6th in Rock-A-Rolla magazine's list of 2011's 50 most important releases. In 2012 Lef wrote music for Saga, the Giovanni Lindo Ferretti opera that featured 14 horses on stage. In 2013 he started the band Berserk! (which signed to RareNoiseRecords in April 2013) with Lorenzo Feliciati. Pat Mastelotto, Jamie Saft, Gianluca Petrella, Eivind Aarset, Cristiano Calcagnile, Fabrizio Puglisi, Sandro Satta and Simone Cavina also took part in the band's eponymous studio album. The album's music is part of the soundtrack composed by Lef for the feature film La città senza notte by Italian director Alessandra Pescetta. In 2013 Sony Music released Giovanni Lindo Ferretti's Saga CD, the tracks of which were composed and produced by Lef. In 2014 he produced MUTATIONS, Obake's 2nd album released through RareNoiseRecords. In 2015 Lef, Pat Mastelotto from King Crimson, Colin Edwin from Porcupine Tree and Carmelo Pipitone from Marta Sui Tubi produced the album INFLAMED RIDES as O.R.k. In 2016 Obake produced the album Draugr. In 2017 Lef composed the score for The Asteroids, a feature film directed by Germano Maccioni. In 2017 he released with the band O.R.k. the album Soul of an Octopus (RareNoiseRecords). In 2019 he released with the band O.R.k. the album Ramagehead (Kscope), featuring Serj Tankian from System of a Down on the track "Black Blooms". The cover was designed by Adam Jones from Tool. In 2021 he scored the Italia. Il fuoco, la cenere film by Céline Gailleurd and Olivier Bohler featuring Isabella Rossellini. In 2002 he scored Amazonia, an Amazon Prime original documentary the last season of which feature Ben Harper. In 2023 he released with the band O.R.k. the album Screamnasium (Kscope) featuring Italian pop star Elisa Toffoli. The cover was again designed by Adam Jones from Tool.

But the pervasive intensity of the record comes in particular from the performance of vocalist Lorenzo Esposito Fornasari, who not only presents himself as a master of his craft, but also brings an almost frightening amount of emotions. He sounds in many places like a rebirth of SOUNDGARDEN frontman Chris Cornell, when he flies full of passion into high, rough fields.

— Marc Langels, Hooked on music on O.R.k.

Comprised of monstrously prolific Zu bassist Massimo Pupillo, Sigillum-S founder and noted experimental guitarist Eraldo Bernocchi – whom you may also know from his Mick Harris collaborations – drummer Balázs Pándi, and shapeshifting vocalist Lorenzo Esposito Fornasari, Obake operate in the twilight area between 'art' and sludge. Fornasari’s contributions in particular firmly place the music herein into the bracket of 'art' – he soars operatically above and through the music, then plummets down into the lower registers to intone, command, insinuate, mutter, howl and screech like a thousand chattering apes. His hollow, tombstone-scraping croak is the equal of any 'Brutal Death Metal' grunter, and his powerful baritone like a dark twin to the similarly gifted Mike Patton. Indeed, hearing his voice across the course of Obake, one could very easily believe that he was the mutant offspring of Patton and Attila Csihar – the demonically-throated voice of Sunn, Mayhem, Void Ov Voices and Aborym – so fluid, stentorian and damned dark are his tones, and, like Patton, he doesn’t merely sing – he vocalises, using his voice as an instrument for adding layers of texture. Fornasari elevates what would already be a seriously tasty musical proposition into a must-hear.

— Paul Robertson, the sleeping Shaman on Obake

== Discography ==
=== Albums ===
- Transgender (2000), Transgender
- A Dream Made of Water (2001), Transgender
- Etno Ambient Project (2002), Transgender
- Sen Soj TrumàS (2003), Transgender
- Litania (2004), Litania
- Unisono (2006), Ashes
- Mey Ark Vu (2007), Transgender
- Costituto (2009), Costituto with Stockhausen Bernocchi and Giovanni Lindo Ferretti (RareNoiseRecords)
- 23 Wheels of Dharma (2010), Somma with Bill Laswell, Hamid Drake, Nils Petter Molvær, Eraldo Bernocchi, Raiz (RareNoiseRecords)
- The night stays (2011), Owls with Tony Wakeford and Eraldo Bernocchi (RareNoiseRecords)
- Untitled (2011), Obake with Eraldo Bernocchi, Massimo Pupillo, Balázs Pándi (RareNoiseRecords)
- Untitled (2013), Berserk! with Lorenzo Feliciati, Eivind Aarset, Gianluca Petrella, Jamie Saft, Pat Mastelotto
- Saga, il canto dei canti (2013), Giovanni Lindo Ferretti with Giovanni Lindo Ferretti
- Mutations (2015), Obake
- Inflamed rides (2015), O.R.k. with Colin Edwin, Pat Mastelotto, Carmelo Pipitone
- Draugr (2016), Obake
- Hypersomniac (2016), LEF with Eivind Aarset, Bill Laswell, Kenneth Kapstad, Nils Petter Molvær, Ståle Storløkken and Rebecca Sneddon
- Soul of An Octopus (2017), O.R.k.
- Ramagehead (2019), O.R.k.
- Italia. Il fuoco, la cenere (2022), LEF, film score with vocals by Isabella Rossellini
- Screamnasium (2022), O.R.k.
- Firehose of Falsehoods (2025), O.R.k. (Kscope)

=== Productions/Remixes ===
- Etno Ambient Project (remixes, 2002), Transgender
- Pain Remixes the Known (2007), Ephel Duath – (Earache Records)

== Film, visual art and adverts scoring ==
=== Films ===
- 2010 - Cose naturali by Germano Maccioni, short
- 2011 - Morte per Acqua by Alessandra Pescetta, short
- 2013 - Fedele alla linea by Germano Maccioni, documentary
- 2013 - Alta via dei parchi by Serena Tommasini Degna and Enrico Brizzi, documentary
- 2015 - The nightless city by Alessandra Pescetta, feature film
- 2017 - Gli asteroidi by Germano Maccioni, feature film
- 2018 - Fabio Mauri, Ritratto a luce solida by Sky Art, documentary film
- 2021 - Italia. Il fuoco, la cenere by Céline Gailleurd / Olivier Bohler, documentary film
- 2021 - Mad Chicken by Moe Irvin, short film
- 2022 - Amazonia (the last season feat. Ben Harper), Amazon Prime original, documentary film

=== Commercials ===
Since 2005, Lef composed the score for over 80 commercials for many brands, including: Louis Vuitton, Varilux, Essilor, Bolon, Mutti, Romerquelle, Harmonie Mutuelle, Kodak, Minute Maid, Récré O'lé – Mont Blanc, Chevrolet, Imetec, Valfrutta, Valsoia, Well, Maya beauty Engineering, Tetley, Cofidis, Harry, Dasani, Ferrari, Vileda, Alexa, and Barilla.

=== Music for visual art ===
- 2005 - The sultan's dream by Bruna Rotunno, video installation
- 2008 - Le donne del cinema by Elisa Seravalli, video installation
- 2009 - La torre riflette by Articolture, video installation
- 2012 - L'arte dell'assedio by Elisa Seravalli, educational video
- 2015 - Non dobbiamo andare a farci ammazzare da stupidi by Elisa Seravalli, video installation
