= Stadio Via del mare =

Football stadium

Coordinates: 40°21′55″N 18°12′32″E

Stadio Ettore Giardiniero - Via del mare
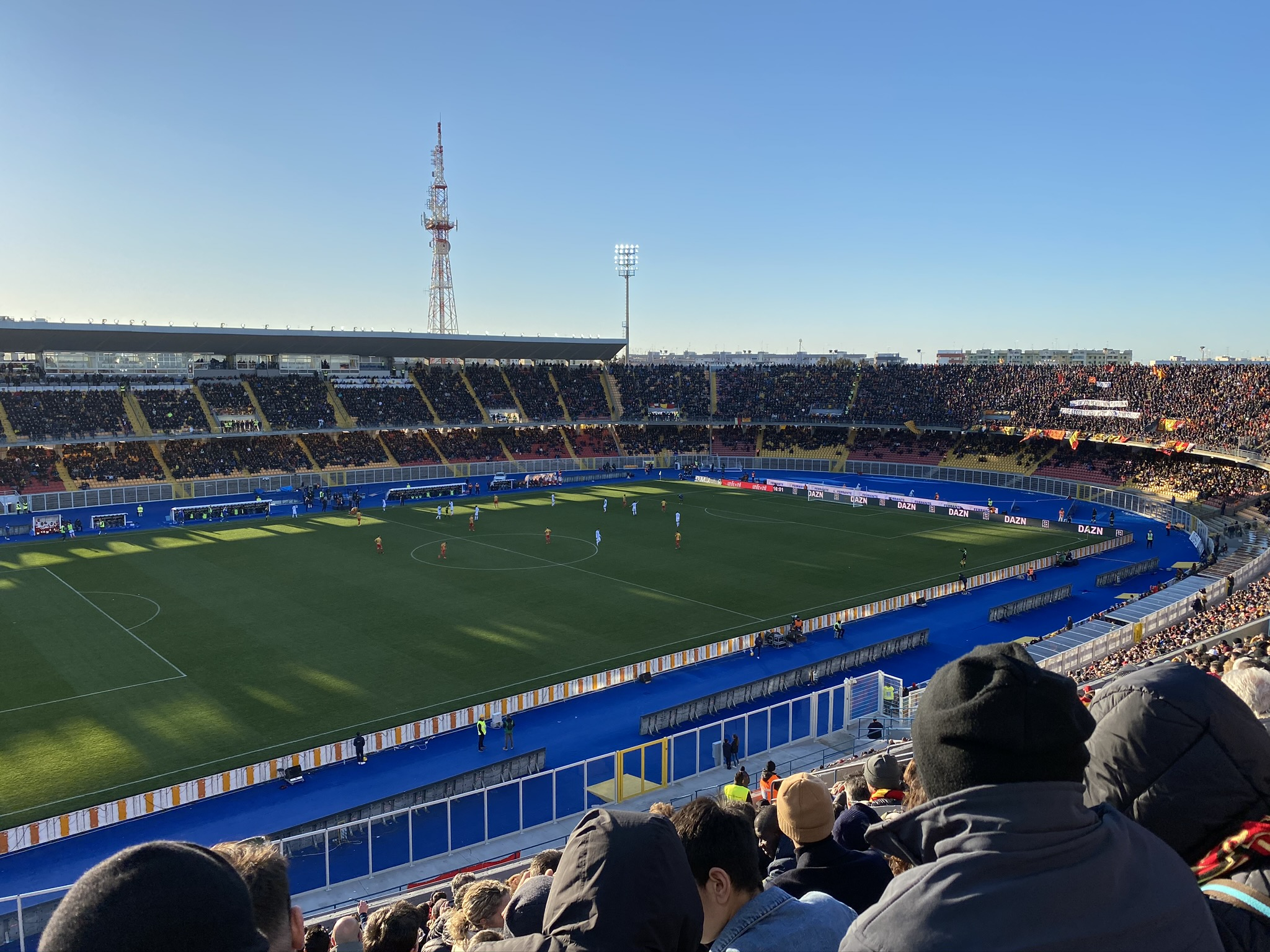
- Interactive map of Stadio Ettore Giardiniero - Via del mare
- Location: Lecce, Italy
- Owner: Municipality of Lecce
- Capacity: 30,534
- Surface: Grass; 105 x 68m

Construction
- Groundbreaking: 1966
- Opened: 11 September 1966
- Renovated: 1976; 1985; 2019

Tenants
- U.S. Lecce (1966–present); Gallipoli (2009–2010); Italy national football team (selected matches)

The Stadio Ettore Giardiniero - Via del mare, known as Stadio Via del mare, is a multi-purpose stadium in Lecce, Italy. It is mostly used for football matches and is the home of U.S. Lecce. The stadium was built in 1966 and holds 40,670 seats. It takes its name from the street leading to the sea, and from the Lecce Mayor at the time of the first renovation of the stadium in 1985.

== History ==
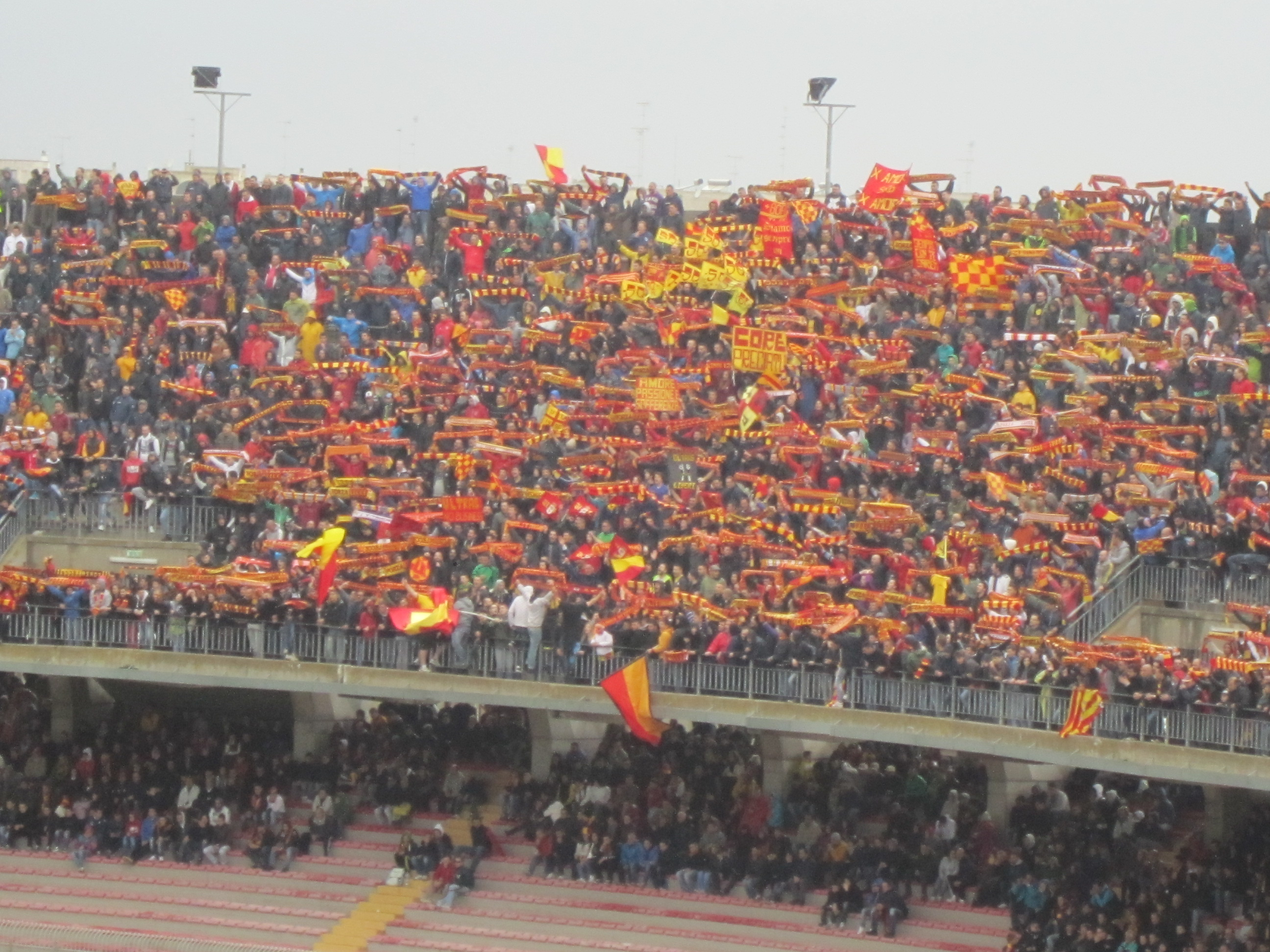
Lecce supporters during a match against Roma, April 2012

The Via del mare was inaugurated on 11 September 1966, during a friendly between U.S. Lecce and Spartak Moscow. The stadium replaced the old Stadio Carlo Pranzo, which was named after a young soldier from Lecce killed in the First World War. On 2 October of that year, the first match between teams from Italy was played with Lecce beating local rivals Taranto 1–0. In 1967 Lecce played a friendly against famous Pelé's Santos here.

The initial capacity was 16,000 spectators. In 1976, the capacity was increased to 20,500 seats. With the historic first promotion of Lecce to Serie A in 1985 the stadium was almost completely rebuilt and capacity greatly increased to 55,000, which made it the 6th stadium in Italy by capacity until 1990 FIFA World Cup. Both the Curva Nord, now the terrace of the organized fan groups led by the Ultrà Lecce, and Curva Sud, where Gioventù are based were rebuilt. The tribuna and Distinti were also upgraded and then, to ensure that all seats were numbered, capacity was reduced to 40,670 seats.

The seats are coloured red and yellow (the colours of U.S. Lecce) and on the Tribuna Est is an inscription of "U.S. Lecce". After this almost total renovation, the stadium in Lecce, along with the Stadio Friuli in Udine, was the only stadium ready for the 1990 FIFA World Cup. However the funding for a venue allocated to the region of Apulia went to the Stadio San Nicola in Bari, which caused some controversy.

In 2002, the stadium was named after Ettore Giardiniero, former mayor of Lecce (1983–1985) who contributed to the renovation of the venue during his term.

During the first day of the Serie B 2007–08 championship, the press room of the stadium was named after the local journalist Sergio Vantaggiato, who died in tragic circumstances in August 2007. The plaque was presented by his son, Martino, in the presence of various local authorities, the management of U.S. Lecce and some journalists of different newspapers.

On 1 November 2007, during a regular training session, lightning struck the ground and killed Antonio De Giorgi, a U.S. Lecce equipment manager.

During the 2009–10 season the stadium hosted the home matches of then Serie B club Gallipoli since its stadium was declared unfit as Serie B venue.

On 22 August 2010 the stadium hosted a friendly between Lecce and Valencia, won by the Spanish side (0–3).

On 12 August 2017 the stadium hosted a friendly match between Inter and Real Betis. Inter won 1–0. On 4 August 2018, the stadium hosted a 2018 International Champions Cup match between Inter and Lyon. Inter won 1–0.

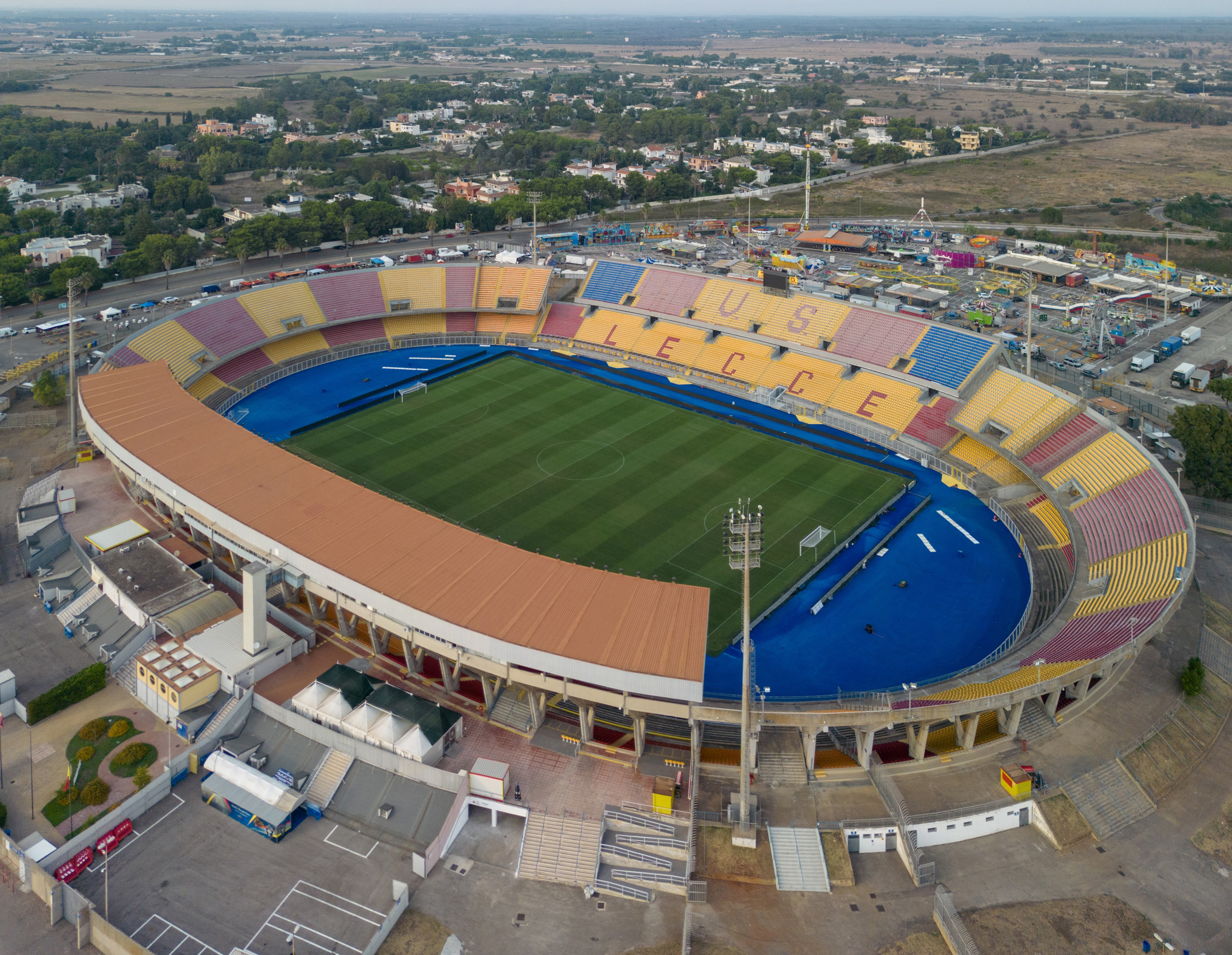
Stadio Via del Mare - Lecce

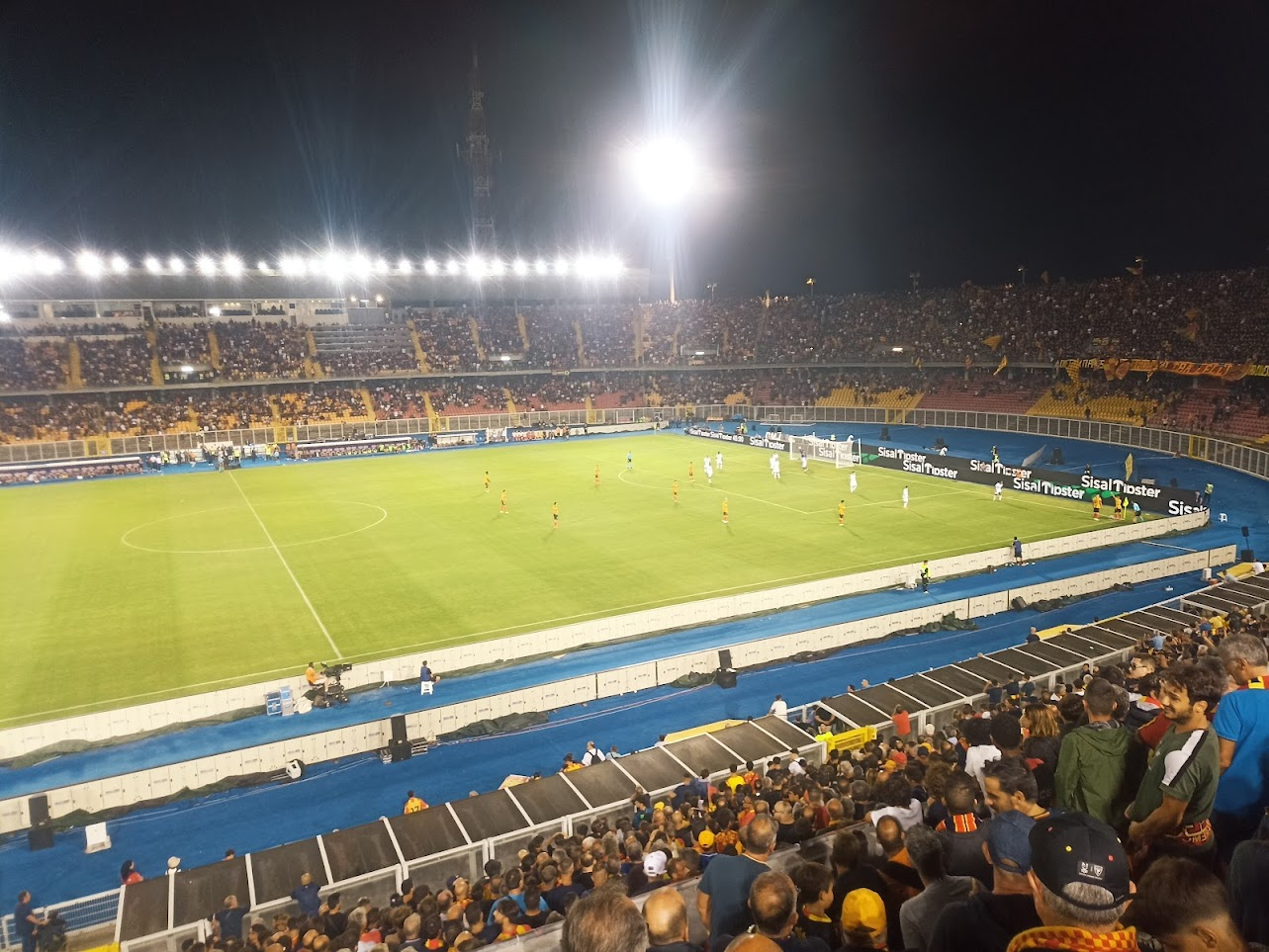
Lecce vs. Salernitana 2-0, Stadio Via del mare, September 3rd, 2023

== Other events ==
The stadium hosted a speech by Pope John Paul II in 1994.

From 14 to 17 July 2011 the stadium hosted the Italia Wave festival with Lou Reed, Kaiser Chiefs, Paolo Nutini and many other artists.
