= Carmelo Pipitone =

Italian songwriter and guitarist

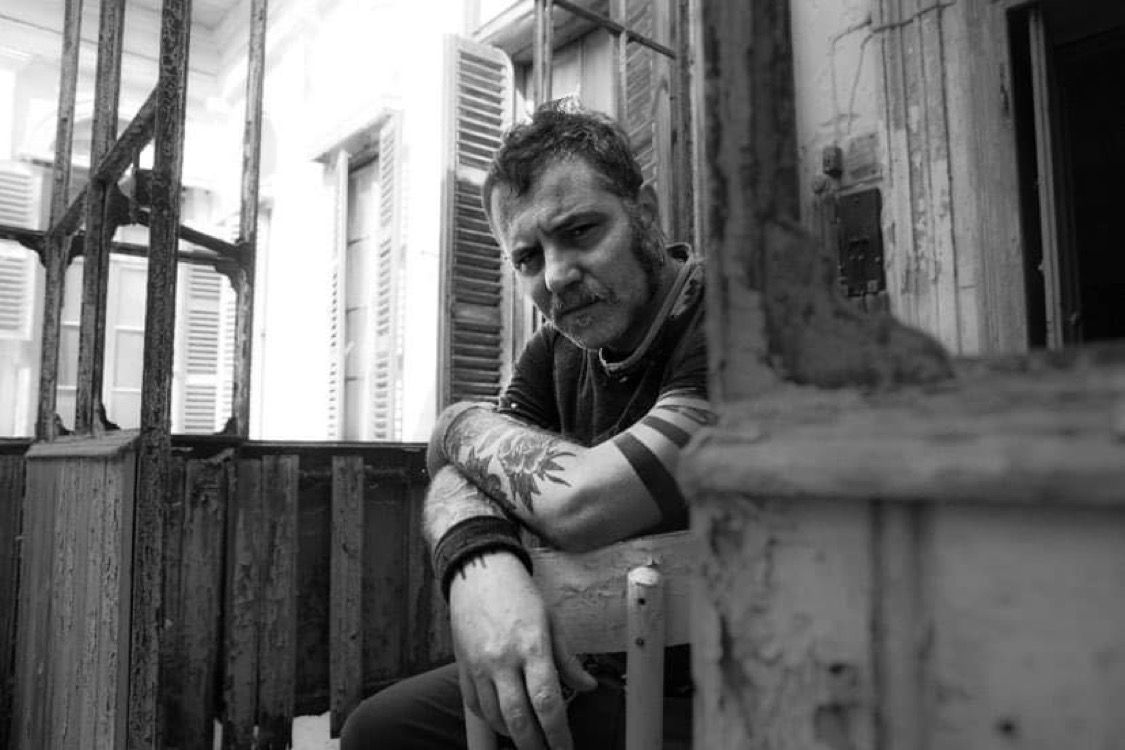

Background information
- Born: October 6, 1978 (age 48); Marsala, Italy
- Genres: Alt rock, folk, acoustic
- Occupations: Songwriter, guitarist
- Instruments: Guitar, vocals
- Years active: 2002–present
- Labels: La Fabbrica, BlackCandy Produzioni
- Member of: Marta sui Tubi, O.R.k.

Carmelo Pipitone (1978) is a songwriter and guitarist formerly known as guitarist-member of the Italian band Marta sui Tubi and the international supergroup O.R.k.

== Biography ==
Carmelo Pipitone was born in Petrosino, at the time part of the municipality of Marsala, in 1978. In Sicily he participated in his first musical projects, the most important of which were RYM.

== Marta sui Tubi ==
In Bologna, in 2002, he formed Marta sui Tubi with Giovanni Gulino. With the band he released 6 studio albums and participated at the 2013 Sanremo Festival. Noteworthy are the collaborations with Lucio Dalla, Franco Battiato, Antonella Ruggiero and Enrico Ruggeri. Other notable stages are the participation at the May Day Concert in Rome, at Italia Wave as support band for Placebo, at the series Romanzo Criminale and at the broadcast Che tempo che fa.

== O.R.k. ==
In 2014 he contributed to the formation of the band O.R.k. with LEF (born Lorenzo Esposito Fornasari), Colin Edwin (ex-Porcupine Tree) and Pat Mastelotto (King Crimson). With the band he had the chance to collaborate with Serj Tankian of System of a Down on the song "Black Blooms" from the album "Ramagehead", with Elisa on the song "Consequence" from the album "Screamnasium" and with Adam Jones from Tool for the creation of the artwork of some albums.

== Solo career ==
He made his solo debut in 2018 by releasing his first album Cornucopia. The release of the album is followed by intense live activity throughout Italy, accompanied by the cuneese musician Nicolas Roncea and subsequently, on some dates, by LEF, former producer of the album.

In 2020 he released his second album Segreto Pubblico, also produced by LEF. The album, released during the Covid pandemic, was subsequently also supported by an intense concert activity throughout the peninsula.

In 2023 he released his first live album called Solo dal vivo recorded in about two years of concerts around Italy, where he plays a live version of the pieces from the first two albums with the addition of a song by Marta sui Tubi. The recordings of the songs were made in different places.

On 15 December 2023, Pipitone released the new single Pinzeri, anticipating the new album Piedi in acqua released on 26 January 2024.

== Other projects ==
In 2018, with brothers Ettore and Marco Giuradei (founders of the Brescia-based band "Giuradei") and Luca Ferrari of Verdena, he formed the band Dunk with whom he released the self-titled album in 2018. The project also involves Riccardo Tesio of Marlene Kuntz in the recording of the single L'Originale and for some concerts.

== Recognitions ==
In 2009 he received the "Insound" Award as best acoustic guitarist. In 2018 he took part at "Propaganda Live" program broadcast on La7 channel as a guest guitarist. In 2022 the online magazine "Rockit.it" named him among the best Italian guitarists ever.

== Collaborations ==
Pipitone has collaborated as a guitarist on songs by Moltheni, Francesco Di Bella, Gulino, Pierpaolo Marino, Andrea Andrillo and Kreky & The Asteroids.

In November 2022 he made his debut as a producer with Diamarte debut album called Transumanza.

== Discography ==
=== Solo studio albums ===
- Cornucopia (2018)
- Segreto pubblico (2020)
- Piedi in acqua (2024)
- Quinto Quarto (2026)

=== Solo live albums ===
- Solo dal vivo (2023)

=== with Marta sui Tubi ===
- Muscoli e dei (2003)
- C'è gente che deve dormire (2005)
- Sushi & Coca (2008)
- Carne con gli occhi (2011)
- Cinque, la luna e le spine (2013)
- Lostileostile (2016)

=== with O.R.k. ===
- Inflamed Rides (2015)
- Soul of an Octopus (2017)
- Ramagehead (2019)
- Screamnasium (2022)

=== with Dunk ===
- Dunk (2018)
