= Dunwich (disambiguation) =

Dunwich is a village in Suffolk, England.

Dunwich may also refer to:

== Places ==
- Dunwich (UK Parliament constituency), a Rotten Borough
- Dunwich, Queensland, an Australian town
- Dutton/Dunwich, Ontario, a Canadian municipality

== Art, entertainment, and media ==
- Dunwich (Lovecraft), H.P. Lovecraft's fictional location
- Dunwich (band), an Italian symphonic metal band
