= Gerstein =

Gerstein is a surname. Notable people with the surname include:

- David Gerstein (born 1974), comics author and editor as well as an animation historian
- Dudu Gerstein (born 1944), Israeli painter and sculptor
- Emma Gerstein (1903–2002), Russian historian and literary critic
- Erez Gerstein (1960–1999), Israeli general
- Irving Gerstein (born 1941), Canadian businessman, politician, Conservative member of the Canadian Senate
- Jonah Gerstein (1827–1891), Lithuanian educationalist and Hebraist
- Kirill Gerstein (born 1979), American and Russian pianist
- Kurt Gerstein (1905–1945), German SS officer and member of the Institute for Hygiene of the Waffen-SS
- Leila Gerstein, American television producer and screenwriter
- Luisa Gerstein, British singer-songwriter and member of Landshapes
- Mark B. Gerstein, American scientist working in bioinformatics
- Mordicai Gerstein (1935–2019), American artist, writer, and film director
- Noemí Gerstein (1910–1996), Argentine sculptor
- Reva Gerstein (1917–2020), Canadian psychologist and educator
- Richard Gerstein (1923–1992), American lawyer and Florida state attorney who obtained the first conviction in the Watergate scandal

== See also ==
- Gerstein Science Information Centre, the University of Toronto's flagship library supporting the sciences and health sciences
- Gerstein Report, written by Kurt Gerstein
- Geierstein
- Gershtein
- Gersten
