= Colin Edwin =

Australian bass guitarist (b. 1970)

Colin Edwin Balch
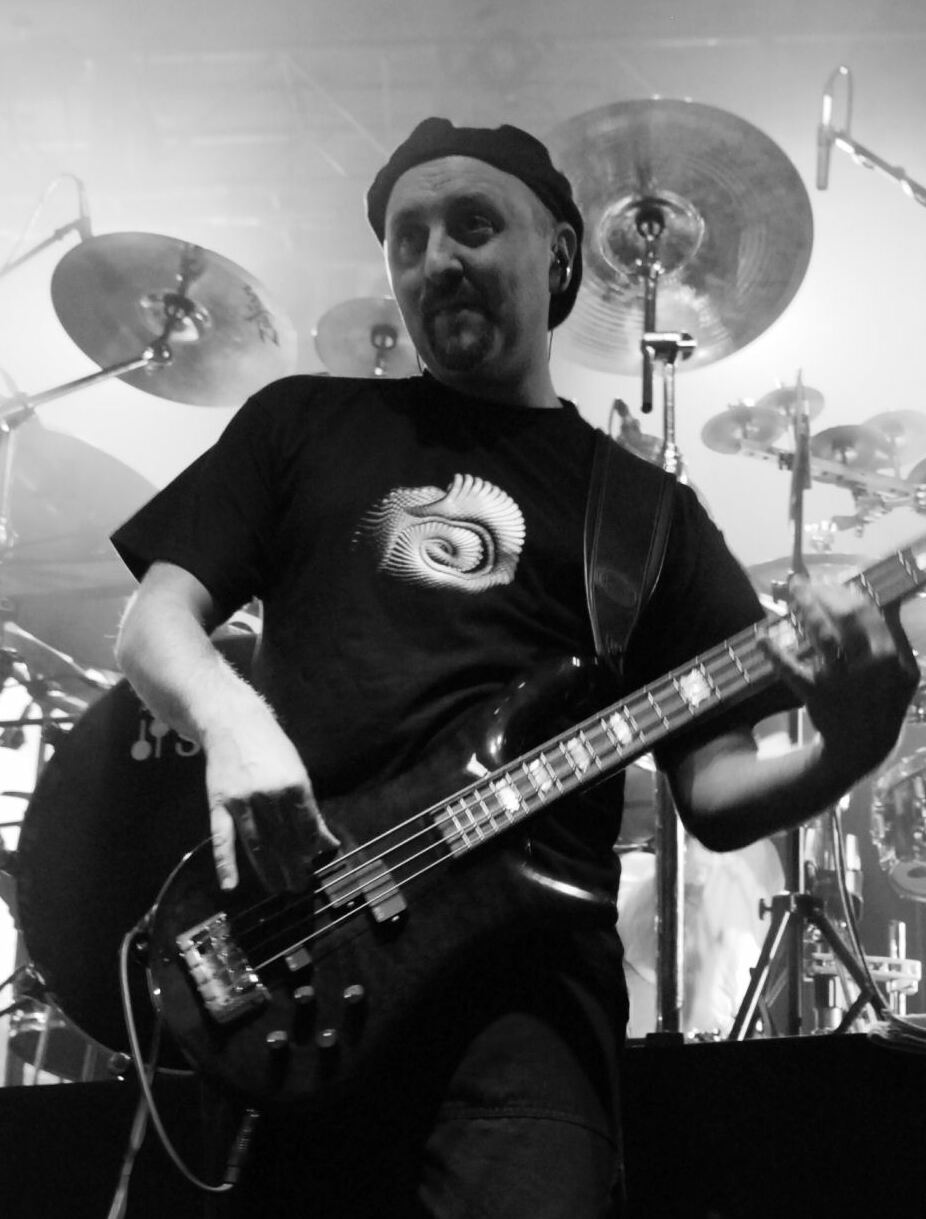

Background information
- Born: Colin Edwin Balch; 2 July 1970 (age 56); Melbourne, Australia
- Origin: Hemel Hempstead, Hertfordshire, England
- Genres: Progressive rock; neo-psychedelia; art rock; jazz fusion; world music; electronica
- Occupation: Musician
- Instruments: Bass guitar; double bass; giumbri
- Years active: 1993–present
- Member of: O.R.k.; Henry Fool
- Formerly of: Porcupine Tree; Ex-Wise Heads; Metallic Taste of Blood; Random Noise Generator; Astarta/Edwin; Twinscapes; Obake; Endless Tapes

Colin Edwin Balch is an Australian musician, specialising in fretted and fretless bass guitar, double bass and guimbri.

Edwin was the bass player in British progressive rock band Porcupine Tree from 1993 to 2011. He is now a member of Ex-Wise Heads, a long-running collaboration with multi instrumentalist Geoff Leigh which mixes ethnic, ambient, and post-modern influences. He is also a member of metal-influenced project Random Noise Generator, and the bands Metallic Taste of Blood and progressive metal act O.R.k., as well as participating in numerous collaborations and releasing solo work.

== Biography ==
Colin Edwin Balch was born in Melbourne on 2 July 1970. During his childhood, his family moved to Hemel Hempstead, England, where he met and became friends with Steven Wilson.

In December 1993, Edwin joined Wilson's progressive rock band Porcupine Tree, in which he played bass guitar, double bass and guimbri. His time in the band lasted until its initial dissolution in 2011, and covered nine studio albums and thirteen live albums. He also played double bass on occasion for Wilson's other main project No-Man, including for 1993 radio sessions and on 2001's Returning Jesus album.

In 1999, Edwin teamed with former Henry Cow instrumentalist Geoff Leigh and percussionist Vincent Salzfaas to form the instrumental ethno-fusion trio Ex-Wise Heads, who have gone on to record six albums (with the project later becoming a duo of Edwin and Leigh augmented by percussionist Rick Edwards and various guests).

Since 2009, Edwin has also been releasing solo work, including two solo albums (Third Vessel in 2009 and PVZ in 2012) both available through Burning Shed. He continues to regularly release standalone solo tracks via his Bandcamp page.

In 2011, Edwin formed the band "Metallic Taste of Blood" with Italian musician Eraldo Bernocchi, Hungarian drummer Balazs Pandi and Keyboard player Jamie Saft, releasing an album on RareNoiseRecords. With a new line-up featuring former Prong drummer Ted Parsons and keyboard player Roy Powell, Metallic Taste of Blood released a second album "Doctoring the Dead" in May 2015, also on RareNoise.

Edwin has continued working with Eraldo Bernocchi in the newest line-up of the band Obake, alongside vocalist Lorenzo Esposito Fornasari with their second album entitled Mutations, which was released in October 2014 on RareNoise.

Also in 2011, Edwin worked with American guitarist Jon Durant on the album Dance of the Shadow Planets and the two collaborated further on the album Burnt Belief released on the Alchemy Records label in 2012. Their third collaboration, Etymology, was released in October 2014.

Edwin has also collaborated with Italian bassist Lorenzo Feliciati, resulting in the album Twinscapes, released on RareNoise in 2014. The Twinscapes album also features contributions from Nils Petter Molvær, David Jackson, Roberto Gualdi and Andi Pupato, and was mixed by bassist and producer Bill Laswell Edwin is known to have an interest in photography and also took the cover image for the album.

In 2014, Edwin joined experimental jazz rock band Henry Fool. In 2015, he joined Lorenzo Esposito Fornasari, guitarist Carmelo Pipitone and drummer Pat Mastelotto in a new band "O.R.k." releasing the albums Inflamed Rides., Soul of an Octopus., and Ramagehead.

Edwin recorded the bass lines for the instrumental rock musical collective Armonite, releasing the albums The Sun is New each Day in 2015 and And the Stars above in 2018, the latter published by Cleopatra Records.

Edwin has also collaborated with Ukrainian female vocal duo Astarta, playing concerts in London and Ukraine and releasing a full-length album in April 2016.

In August 2025, Edwin started a new project with former Porcupine Tree drummer, Chris Maitland, called 'The Baldock Transmission' which also features Guitarist, Jon Durant, who Edwin has previously collaborated with in their duo 'Burnt Belief'. Music will be released on 7 November 2025.

Edwin has now teamed up with another former Porcupine Tree member, former touring guitarist, John Wesley. They are touring as 'Colin Edwin & John Wesley's Voyage 35' ('Voyage 35' for short) which is a reference to the early porcupine recording, Voyage 34. They will be playing early Porcupine Tree songs from the first few PT albums. It is not yet clear if Chris Maitland will be involved.

== Style and equipment ==
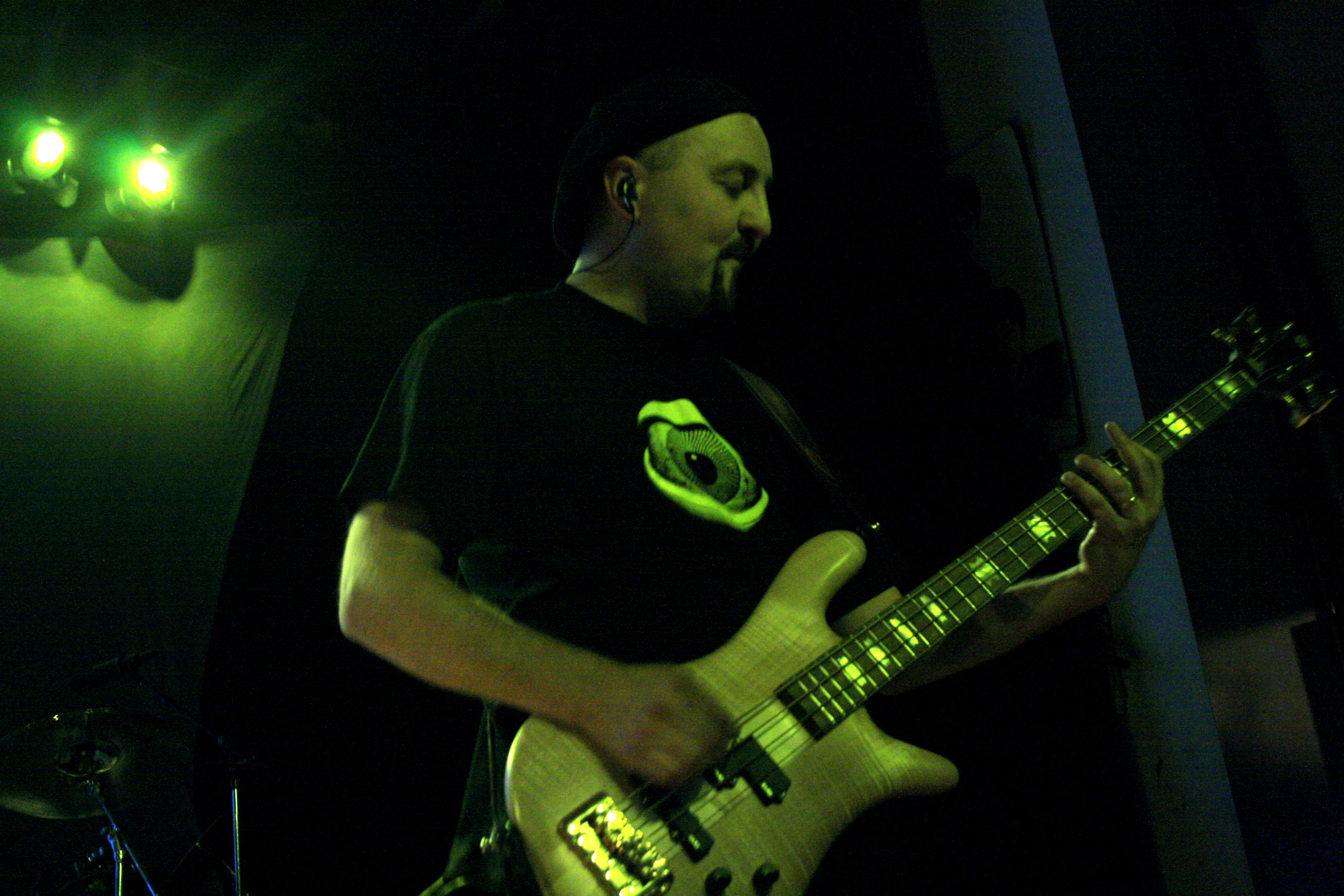
Edwin performing with Porcupine Tree in 2007

Edwin is a jazz fan, and incorporates an atypical jazz-inspired style into his playing for a rock band. He also has a strong interest in world music and in electronica, reflected particularly in his work with Ex-Wise Heads and in his solo releases.

In between 1994 and 2004, Edwin's main bass was a 1994 Wal Mark I four-string fretless bass, until he gave it "a break" and semi-retired it from the rigours of live touring. He subsequently used a Music Man StingRay and, for the Deadwing Tour, a Music Man Bongo which can be viewed in action on Porcupine Tree's DVD release Arriving Somewhere....

During that time period Edwin was introduced to Spector basses and purchased a EuroLX 4-string model in Natural Oil. The company then gave him one of their extended scale-length models (35" as opposed to the "standard" 34" scale for 4-string basses), a Euro 4LX-35 in transparent black. This proved to be useful as over half of their 2007 album, Fear of a Blank Planet was downtuned C/F/Bb/Eb to which the 35" scale length give better definition to the lower notes. For the second leg of the Fear of a Blank Planet Tour starting in October 2007 a ReBop Deluxe FM unlined fretless bass in Natural Oil was used for the song "A Smart Kid" among others, and well as using his Music Man Bongo bass guitar as his spare or encore bass.

As of late September 2009 Edwin was back to using his fretted and fretless Wal Mark I 4-string basses for the majority of the tour supporting the Porcupine Tree release of The Incident. He played approximately 85% of The Incident song-cycle on his Wal basses. His black Spector Euro 4LX-35 was used for the other 15% "heavy parts" which were down-tuned to C Standard. Edwin still endorses the Spector and Basslab basses as well as EBS amplifiers, speaker cabinets, and effects pedals. He endorses Ernie Ball Bass Strings for use on his Wal fretless bass and Spector Medium Stainless Steel Bass Strings on his fretted Spector basses.

== Discography (Outside of Porcupine Tree) ==
Solo Albums

Year	Title	Label
2009	Third Vessel	Hard World
2012	P.V.Z.	Hard World
2015	Mesh E.P.	Hard World
2020	Infinite Regress	Hard World

With Ex-Wise Heads

Year	Title	Label
2002	No Grey Matter	Hard World
2003	Time and Emotion Study	Hard World
2006	Holding Up the Sky	Hard World
2007	Liquid Assets	Hard World
2010	Celestial Disclosure	Tonefloat
2011	Schemata	Hard World

With Lorenzo Feliciati as Twinscapes

Year	Title	Label
2014	Twinscapes	RareNoise

With Armonite

Year	Title	Label
2015	The Sun Is New Each Day	Merry-Go-Sound
2018	And the Stars Above	Cleopatra Records

With Metallic Taste of Blood

Year	Title	Label
2012	Metallic Taste of Blood	RareNoise
2015	Doctoring the Dead	RareNoise

With Obake

Year	Title	Label
2014	Mutations	RareNoise
2016	Draugr	RareNoise

With Jon Durant

Year	Title	Label
2011	Dance of the Shadow Planets	Alchemy
2012	Burnt Belief	Alchemy
2014	Etymology	Alchemy
2016	Emergent	Alchemy
2021	Mutual Isolation	Alchemy

With O.R.k.

Year	Title	Label
2015	Inflamed Rides	Hard World
2017	Soul of An Octopus	RareNoise
2019	Ramagehead	Kscope
2022	Screamnasium	Kscope

With Tim Bowness

Year	Title	Label
2014	Abandoned Dance Hall Dreams	Inside Out
2015	Stupid Things That Mean The World	Inside Out
2017	Lost In The Ghost Light	Inside Out

With Astarta as Astarta/Edwin

Year	Title	Label
2016	Astarta/Edwin	CompMusic

With Endless Tapes

Year	Title	Label
2013	Endless Tapes EP	Hard World
2016	Brilliant Waves	Hard World

With Gaudi

Year	Title	Label
2017	Magnetic	Rarenoise

With Jon Durant and Inna Kovtun

Year	Title	Label
2019	Edwin Durant Kovtun	Alchemy

== Current equipment ==
- 2012 Spector USA Series Bolt-On NS-4H2-MM Black Cherry High Gloss Custom Shop 4-string fretless bass (Unlined Ebony fingerboard) with EMG MM-TW pick-ups, Aguilar OBP-3 preamp & Hipshot hardware
- 2006 Spector Euro 4LX-35 4-string bass downtuned to "C Standard" (C/F/Bb/Eb) in Transparent Black. strung with Spector Medium Stainless Steel strings.
- BassLab Soul-IV in Black (used mainly as a studio bass and also as a backup/encore bass on the "Fear of a Blank Planet" tour) strung with Ernie Ball Hybrid Slinky strings.
- BassLab Soul-IV in Metallic Orange (prototype bass borrowed from Heiko Hoepfinger used as a studio/recording bass
- EBS TD 650 amplifier and two 4x10" Proline neodymium cabs.
- EBS ValveDrive tube preamp/overdrive pedal, EBS MultiDrive distortion, EBS OctaBass octave, EBS MultiComp compressor, EBS UniChorus Chours, EBS Bass IQ Envelope Filter, EBS Tremolo, Boss HR-2 Harmonist, Boss TU-2 Chromatic Tuner.

== Previously used equipment ==
- 2007 Spector ReBop Deluxe FM unlined fretless bass in Natural Oil.
- 2004 Music Man Stingray fretted 4-string bass (Natural ash finish, Rosewood fretboard) with a Hipshot Bass Extender installed for downtuning the E-string to D.
- 2005 Music Man Bongo 4-string bass in "Stealth (flat) Black" (used for the majority of the "Deadwing" tour as seen on the band's Arriving Somewhere... Live DVD and as a backup/encore bass on the 2007–08 "Fear of a Blank Planet" tour).
- Trace Elliott AH350 amplifier and speaker cabinets
- Tech 21 LM300 amplifier and two 4x10" speaker cabinets ("trashed on a European tour by some slack local crew")
