= Fabio Mauri =

- Born: 15 February 1926 (age 100); Rome, Italy
- Died: May 20, 2009 (aged 83)
- Occupations: Artist; photographer; teacher; actor
- Years active: 1954–2009

Fabio Mauri (February 15, 1926 – May 20, 2009) was an Italian multi-disciplinary artist, actor, and pedagogue. In a career spanning more than 50 years, he has created a significant body of work in a wide variety of artistic fields. Seven times Mauri's works have been presented at the Venice Biennale. He has been called one of Italy's most important contemporary artists. The main subject of research and reflection for Mauri has always been the influence of mass media and propaganda of various ideologies on the human being, their role in inciting wars.

== Career ==
=== Early years and family ===
Fabio Mauri was a multidisciplinary artist, active in theater, performance, installation, painting, writing, and teaching. He was born in Rome in 1926 to Umberto Mauri and Maria Luisa Bompiani. Mauri was a part of the family deeply connected to theatre, art and literature. His grandfather Achille Mauri was a theater impresario, his uncle Valentino Bompiani founded the publishing house of the same name, his father Umberto in the 1930s was managing director of Messaggerie Italiane. Fabio's early years passed in Bologna, he studied at the Liceo Galvani and met Pier Paolo Pasolini.

=== War and its impact ===
Already in 1942, together with Pier Paolo Pasolini Mauri co-founded Il Setaccio (The Sieve) art magazine and started publishing his drawings. The publication was closed in 1943, but became an important step for both of them. Mauri's early years were deeply affected by World War II. When he was drafted into the Italian Army, he suffered a nervous breakdown and several psychotic crises, arriving at the point of near mutism. He spent eight years in psychiatric hospitals and monasteries (much later in life, he would confess to have experienced at least 33 episodes of electroshock treatment). Almost a decade after the war, with the help of his father, who worked with Luigi Pirandello, Mauri managed to become an assistant on a South American tour of Pirandello's Six Characters in Search of an Author. In Latin America, Mauri fell in love with an actress in the production, his mental state improved and he rediscovered himself as an artist. He tried to pour out artistically his trauma via crossed performance, installation, drawing, and writing. His first private exhibition opened in 1954 in Venice.

=== Art career ===
In 1957, he created his first Schermo (Screen), a so-called ‘zero degree’ painting imitating a black film frame. In the following years, the Schermi would evolve into his signature series of artworks, through which he tried to reflect on the influence of the cinema, TV and mass media in general. He was searching for the moment when individual thought comes into contact with collective ideas, recognizing the paroxysmal presence of the screen as a surface of tensions between public and private.

In 1964, Mauri debuted at the Venice Biennale. Though Pop Art triumphed at the Biennale and it had an overall huge success, for Mauri it became a full stop, after which he left this style behind and devote himself to a language strongly rooted in the European tradition.

In the 1970s, Mauri immersed into studies of the ideological component of the linguistic avant-garde. In 1972, he released Linguaggio è guerra (Language is war), a book/artwork that presents a selection of photographic reproductions, transformed by cutting and editing, from English and German magazines. Each image was stamped ‘Language is war’. Mauri reflected on the multiplicity of ideological languages that societies manipulate in the pursuit of ideological domination.

His first major performance What is Fascism took place in Rome in 1971, and then repeated at the Venice Biennale and in New York. In the following year, Mauri's installation “Warum ein Gedanke einen Raum verpestet? / Why does a thought poison a room?” Another important performance Che cosa è la filosofia. Heidegger e la questione tedesca (What is Philosophy. Heidegger and the German question) was presented in 1989. In 1975, at the inauguration of the new Galleria Comunale d’Arte Moderna in Bologna, Mauri presented his performance "Intellettuale. Il vangelo secondo Matteo di/su Pier Paolo Pasolini", dedicated to his long-time friend. Pasolini, seated with his back to the public, served as a screen where Mauri projected Il vangelo secondo Matteo. In "Intellettuale", the author represents all authors and the film stands for all films in general, a symbol of author's consciousness and intellectual subjectivity.

From 1979 to 2001, he taught Aesthetics of Experimentation at the Academy of Fine Arts in L’Aquila.

His first retrospective titled Fabio Mauri Works and Actions was opened in 1994 at the National Gallery of Modern and Contemporary Art in Rome. The second one followed in 1997, opened at the Kunsthalle in Klagenfurt. Another vast retrospective of his works was presented in 2003 in Le Fresnoy, Studio National des Arts Contemporains in Lille.

In 1999, he presented his work Mia cugina Marcella e la guerra civile (My cousin Marcella and the Civil War) at the Fundación La Caixa in Barcelona. The installation was dedicated to the Spanish Civil War, where many Italians fought. Marcella, Mauri's cousin, was a nurse in the International Brigades. The installation included many everyday objects belonging to people who participated in those war years, photos of news reports from those years, and a projection of the Ballad of a Soldier by Grigory Chukhray. Mauri was trying to identify the mystery of the things that survived the owners and the war, and how intertwined life, death, and happiness are.

=== Writing ===
Mauri was also active in the field of literature and publishing. Among his early efforts was the work for the Bompiani publishing house on the Dizionario delle Opere e dei Personaggi. In the 1950s, he collaborated with Bompiani in the creation of the Almanacco Letterario Bompiani. In 1958, Mauri emerged as playwright and theatre director with a play Il Benessere, co-written with Franco Brusati and staged at the Teatro Stabile di Roma. It was followed by IL’Isola, a pop-codemy play. Later, in 1976, he became one of the founders of the La città di Riga art magazine. In the same year, he published his first book, Manipolazione di cultura. For several decades, starting in 1983, he was the director of the Messaggerie Italiane and the Garzanti Publishing houses.

In 1984, Mauri published his next book Cosa è, se è, l’ideologia nell’arte (What is, if it is, the ideology in Art). A huge volume included the collection of published and unpublished texts by the artist on works from the 1970s. Four years later, it was followed by the Storia di un manifesto mancato (A story of lost manifest), a collection of articles written by Mauri and published in Arte in Italia magazine between 1960 and 1985.

=== Later years ===
In 2007, his massive installation Inverosimile took part in the Not Afraid of the Dark exhibition by Emergenze in Milan's HangarBicocca. The installation followed 50 years of the artist's career. It included settings, a soundtrack, cinema projections, and a performance by the actor Luigi Lo Cascio who recited a passage from the Book of Revelation from a suspended crane.

In February 2009, his last work Fabio Mauri etc was presented at the Michela Rizzo Gallery in Venice.

After a long illness, Fabio Mauri died on 19 May 2009. The funeral ceremony took place at the church of Sant'Agnese in Agone in Piazza Navona on May 22. Several days later, Italy's then president Giorgio Napolitano named Fabio Mauri a Grand Officer of Merit of the Italian Republic.

== Legacy and influence ==
Mauri is widely considered one of the most important Italian neo-avant-garde artists. He exposed the mechanisms of ideology, exploring the languages of propaganda, analyzing the collective imagination and the structures of media narratives. His works and actions, which include painting, drawing, sculpture, installation, performance, explored the European history of the “short century” in its conflicts and contradictions. Mauri's works have been selected seven times for the Venice Biennale, two of them posthumously.

In 2018, a documentary movie on Mauri, Ritratto a luce solida, was directed by Lorenzo Esposito Fornasari and produced by Sky Art.

== Selected works ==
=== Literature ===
- I 21 modi di non pubblicare un libro, Bologna, Il Mulino, 1990
- Sulle ginocchia di Pirandello, Ogni uomo è tutti gli uomini, Edizioni, 2010
- Le piccole provinciali di M. de P., Genova, Il Canneto editore, 2011

=== Theatre ===
- Il benessere (with Franco Brusati), 1962.
- Vivì, 1962. A lyrical drama in four acts and six paintings by Paola Masino and Biondo Missiroli, music by Franco Mannino.
- L' isola: commedia in due tempi, 1966 (staged in 1966 by Alberto Bonucci, Francesco Mulè, Rosemarie Dexter and Dany París)
- Lezione d'Inglese, 1977 (Teatro Stabile, Rome, with Grazia Antonimi, Tony Garrani, Fabrizio Jovine, directed by Fabio Mauri and Robert Kleyn).

== Sources ==
- Marramao, Giacomo (2018). L'esperimento del mondo: Mistica e filosofia nell'arte di Fabio Mauri. Rome: Bollati Boringhieri. ISBN 978-88-339-3158-6.
