= Armonite =

- Origin: Pavia, Italy
- Genres: Progressive Rock
- Years active: 2015-Present
- Label: Cleopatra Records
- Members: Paolo Fosso, various
- Website: armonite.com

Armonite is an instrumental rock musical collective from Pavia, Italy. Their debut record, The Sun Is New Each Day was produced at Abbey Road Studios and released in 2016. It features Porcupine Tree bassist Colin Edwin. In 2018, Cleopatra Records released their new album, And the Stars Above. They are also noted for their soundtrack covers. The Huffington Post called the band, "compelling, captivating, and worth exploring."

== Career ==
Armonite formed in 1996 when its members where still in college. In 1999 they released their first record and soon after broke up. In 2015, the bands founding members, Paolo Fosso and Jacopo Bigi came back together to record The Sun Is New Each Day with Colin Edwin and Jasper Barendregt. They hired producer Paul Reeve, known for his work with Muse, Steve Harley and The Beta Band. The record was mastered at Abbey Road Studios in London.

With the track 'Blue Curaçao', Armonite have been awarded an Honorable Mention both in the Instrumental and Performance categories at the International Songwriting Competition 2017 from a committee including Tom Waits, Lorde, Bastille, Billy Cobham, Ziggy Marley, Don Omar, and Keane.

On May 25, 2018, Cleopatra Records released Armonite's new album, And the Stars Above, which has been presented in Japan.

== Critical reception ==
Armonite received generally positive reviews. The Big Takeover went so far as to call their work, "A creation almost unlike anything else being made today." The Seattle Post-Intelligencer compared Armonite to a musical kaleidoscope, as if "Liberace, Mozart, and Canada's Rush got together for a jam session."

music-news.com called the band "an exciting and moving piece of creative, collaborative art." Following And the Stars above release, Prog (magazine) wrote "An album to be proud of."

Heathen Harvest also sang the bands praises, claiming, "While I’m not sure it would be quite fair to lump Armonite in under the same canon as Premiata Forneria Marconi and their ilk, there’s a similar sense of adventurousness in their sound that you seldom hear in modern prog anymore."

== Discography ==
- The Sun Is New Each Day
- And the Stars above
