= WorldService Project =

Musical group

- Origin: London, United Kingdom
- Genres: Jazz, Rock, Punk, Nu jazz, Experimental
- Years active: 2009–present
- Labels: RareNoiseRecords, Megasound, Brooke Records
- Website: worldserviceproject.co.uk

WorldService Project is a British band founded and led by keyboard player, vocalist and composer Dave Morecroft. The group plays a combination of jazz, rock, punk and experimental styles and has toured extensively across Europe, Asia and America since its formation in 2009.

== History ==
After a few years of musical collaboration between Morecroft, trombonist Raphael Clarkson and saxophonist Tim Ower, Worldservice Project settled on its initial line up in 2009, having supported Acoustic Ladyland at Boiler Room. The group included bassist Conor Chaplin and drummer Neil Blandford and released its first album Relentless in 2011. During this period WorldService Project toured the UK and Scandinavia with Norwegian group SynKoke, as well as shows in Berlin with German band Schulbus, and Ireland with ReDiviDeR. These shows were organised through European touring network Match&Fuse and led to the band winning the Peter Whittingham Award.

In 2012 the band played 12 Points Festival in Porto.

In 2013 the band released its second album Fire In A Pet Shop on Megasound records. The record contains "free-jazz melees, glimpsed bebop, and thrash chords" and established the group as "a riotously entertaining live band". This year the band embarked on their 'Music and Miles' USA tour, playing thirty five dates in forty days, visiting seventeen States and performing in Chicago, Nashville, New Orleans, Detroit and Philadelphia. Liam Waugh replaced Blandford for all live appearances in 2013, which also included Umea Jazz (Sweden), Tampere Jazz Happening (Finland) and Jazz sur son 31 (France).

In 2014 the band was a finalist for the Young European Jazz Ensemble Burghausen.

In September 2015 the band recorded its third album For King And Country at Rockfield Studios, with Arthur O'Hara replacing Chaplin on bass and Harry Pope replacing Waugh on drums. The album was produced by Chris Sharkey (Acoustic Ladyland, Roller Trio, Trio VD) and was released on 29 April 2016 on RareNoiseRecords, beginning a long relationship with the label. Reviews drew comparisons with Frank Zappa, John Zorn and Django Bates and described the band's "tough, steely, confrontational new sound". 2015 and 2016 also saw WorldService Project touring Asia for the first time, performing twenty concerts in China as well as festival appearances in India and Japan.

In 2016 WorldService Project played Tallinn Music Week and toured Estonia.

2018 saw the release of the band's fourth album Serve, produced by Liran Donin (Led Bib, 1000 Boats, Ill Considered). The record was launched at The Cockpit Theatre in London as part of a ten-date UK tour, and the band made major festival appearances including Cork Jazz Festival, Galway Jazz Festival, JazzFest Berlin and Lancaster Jazz Festival. The band also returned to China and India, performing at Goa Jazz Festival, Kolkata Jazz Festival and NH7 Pune. After the recording of Serve, saxophonist Tim Ower and drummer Harry Pope were replaced by Ben Powling and Luke Reddin-Williams respectively. Trombonist Raphael Clarkson left the band in 2019 and the group began to regularly perform as a quartet, including touring in Italy (the current base of band leader Dave Morecroft).

In early 2020 the band recorded their fifth album, Hiding In Plain Sight, at Greenmount Studios in Leeds, once again with producer Liran Donin. Much of the material features the group as a quartet, but the album also includes trombonist Kieran Mccloud, who had joined the group for some periods of touring in 2018 and 2019. The album's single "Deeper" was featured in Jazzwise. The album was released during the corona virus pandemic in September 2020 and the band played a postponed UK tour in November 2021 alongside Roller Trio. The band undertook a subsequent 10-date European tour in spring 2022, including Bartok Spring Music International Arts Week in Budapest.

== Discography ==
- Relentless (2011)
- Fire In A Pet Shop (Megasound, 2013)
- For King And Country (RareNoiseRecords, 2015)
- Serve (RareNoiseRecords, 2018)
- Hiding In Plain Sight (RareNoiseRecords, 2020)
