= Dunwich (band) =

- Genres: Symphonic metal/gothic metal/progressive metal
- Years active: 1985–present
- Website: dunwich.it

Dunwich is an Italian symphonic/gothic metal band founded in Rome in 1985. Dunwich were among the first to use a female vocalist and symphonic music elements, especially brass instrument. Rockeramagazine considers them forerunners of the modern symphonic metal, defining them as the "first symphonic metal band".

== History ==
=== The name ===
The project was founded in 1985 by Claudio Nigris a multi-instrumentalist. At the time he was twenty years old. The inspiration for Dunwich comes from:

- The Lovecraftian world, the band first demo tape of 1985 was The Dunwich Horror like the short story of the same name.
- The city of Dunwich in Suffolk disappeared due to storms and coastal erosion between 1287 and 1328.

=== The 80s ===
The first period of Dunwich projects lasts until 1992, with the productions of fours demo tapes, inspired mainly from Lovecraftian works. The first three demos has also the titles borrowed from Lovecraft's stories: The Dunwich Horror (1985), Horror at Red Hook (1988) and Morbid dance tale of Yog-Sothoth (1989). The group was initially formed by: the keyboardist Claudio Nigris, the only one who never left the Dunwich; the singer Max or Maeth from 1987 to 1992 (she eventually left to create her own group, the Blooding Mask); the drummer Fabiana del Vico and the bassist Paolo di Virgilio, both from 1985 to 1989 and Vincenzo Trasca, official guitarist from 1985 to 1988 but he continued working with the Dunwich as an external performer. In 1989 two new guitarists joined the group, Andy Maniero till 1992 (then he formed the Martiria) and Alessandro Vitanza till 1999. In 1991 Dunwich was on Main Stage at Arezzo Wave in 1991, they were also broadcast on VideoMusic, the Italian music television between '80s and '90s. The first period of Dunwich productions end in the same year with the demo tape On the way back. Elements of inspirations are not only Lovecraft's stories, but they begin to include also legends and other references.

=== The 90s ===
Crucial in developing Dunwich sound is the encounter with the singer Katya Sanna, who joined the project in 1992, remaining there until 1999. The elements of Dunwich inspiration becomes medieval and gothic literary elements, but also research on fairy tales and legends from around the world. The first production is divided into three demo tapes, Il tavolo di smeraldo (1992), Sul monte è il tuono and Sopra il lago il vento, both of 1993. In these demos appear all the elements that build the symphonic sound of Duwnich: brass, quintets, orchestras and medieval polyphonic choirs. The debut album, Sul monte il tuono (On the mountain, the thunder), which takes its title from the same demo, is published by Black Widow in 1994, receiving a great response to critics. Following in the 1995 the second album Il chiarore sorge due volte (Flare rises twice) for the Pick-Up Records. In this album came out the band attentions to the sounds of the new wave gothic. In 1998, with the German label Rising Sun Records, is published Eternal eclipse of frost, which accentuates the metal sound. This album allows Dunwich to project ind the international scene. Echoes the style of the album can be found, according to the journalist Eduardo Vitolo, the album Sirius B of Therion 's 2004.

=== 2000s ===
The experience of the project Dunwich continues in 2004 with a new line-up.: the new singer Francesca Naccarelli, Roberto Fasciani, bass, Luca Iovenio, drums. The fourth studio album is, in 2008, Heilagmanoth Since this production, they started also some collaborations. In 2009 Francesca Naccarelli is, with Damian Wilson and Zachary Stevens among the voices chosen for The Akallabêth, a project from Italian keyboard player Archangel. This concept album based on the fourth part of Silmarillion combines elements of progressive and hard rock. In 2010, Dunwich compose The Oblong box a song for a multi-band project The Tales of Edgar Allan Poe – A Symphonic Collection produced by Finnish magazine Colossus with French label Musea. In 2012, for Italian progressive group Karnya, Claudio Nigris made some violins arrangements and the singer Francesca Naccarelli is guest in a song. In 2016 Francesca Naccarelli left the Dunwich. In 2021 Vincenzo Trasca joined again the group. In March 2023 the band released a new album “Horror at Red Hook – Anthology of the 1958/88 + revised unreleased tracks”. In the CD there are the original recordings of the first 2 demos (Dunwich Horror and Horror at Red Hook) and two unpublished works of the same first period intitled “The Crypt of Atthis” and “Grey Skies” adapted from the new band. In July 2023 the Genoese record label “Black Widow” released the LP/CD “Il Sogno e L’Incubo – vita e opere di H.P. Lovercraft” an international collection of all songs inspired by the Providence dreamer’s tales. Among all songs there is “Whispering Darkness” (edit 2021) from the Dunwich.

=== Discography ===
==== Studio albums ====
- 1994 – Sul monte il tuono
- 1995 – Il chiarore sorge due volte
- 1998 – Eternal eclipse of frost
- 2008 – Heilagmanoth
- 2023 - Horror at Red Hook - Anthology of the 1985/88 + revisited unreleased tracks

==== Other projects ====
- 2010 – The Oblong box in The Tales of Edgar Allan Poe – A collection Synphonic
- 2015 - Il secondo chiarore - Northern Spirits
- 2023 - Whispering Darkness - Il Sogno e l'Incubo

== Bibliography ==
- Della Cioppa, Gianni (2009). Italian metal legion: 1980–1991. I giorni del sogno (in Italian). QuiEdit. ISBN 978-8864640099.
- Vitolo, Edoardo (1998). Sub Terra – Rock estremo e cultura underground in Italia 1977 (in Italian). Tsunami Edizioni. ISBN 978-8896131411.
- Della Cioppa, Gianni (2012). Va pensiero. 30 anni di rock e metal in italiano. CRAC Edizioni. ISBN 978-8897389057.
- Lazzati, Alessio; Vitolo, Eduardo (2010). Horror rock. La musica delle tenebre (in Italian). Arcana. ISBN 978-8862311366.
