= Ashtech =

Italian musician and producer (born 1973)

- Born: Andrea Nicoletti; December 15, 1973 (age 52)
- Genres: Dub music Electronica; Dubstep
- Occupations: Record producer, bassist, musician, remixer, DJ
- Instruments: Bass guitar, synthesizer, music programming, turntables
- Years active: 1996–present
- Labels: Interchill Records, RareNoise, Sony BMG
- Website: ashtech.org

Ashtech (born Andrea Nicoletti, December 15, 1973, Italy) is an Italian producer, bass player and solo artist. His style combines original dub and urban electronica and it is characterised by the flavor of his heavy dubby bassline which features in all of his productions. Ashtech's recent work, primarily 'Walkin Target', released in 2007 on Interchill Records Involving input from fellow producer Gaudi and vocalist Cheshire Cat (Leftfield), was very well received by the UK and US electronica/dub scene. He has appeared at festivals such as Glade (UK) – Electric Picnic (Ireland) – Eclipse Festival – Waveform Festival (UK).

== Early career ==
His first steps in music were originally as a DJ, approaching electronica and developing a passion for experimental music. Ashtech became an established figure in the Italian mainstream music scene, collaborating with many artists, both as a producer and as a composer, on a total of 14 albums, three of which with Almamegretta (4/4, IMAGINARIA, and Venite Venite) under BMG record label. His five-year collaboration with Almamegretta saw him touring extensively in Italy and Europe and sharing the stage with acts such as Tricky, The Wailers, Erykah Badu, Mory Kante, Compay Segundo, Groove Armada and Asian Dub Foundation.

== WOP ==
During his last year in Italy, Ashtech collaborated with Raiz (Almamegretta's historical voice) on his first album, WOP for Universal Records and he produced the single "Wop". During the Wop tour, Ashtech decided to move to London in order to access the innovative music industry there.

== "With Me" ==
After moving to London, Ashtech released "With Me" for the compilation album, The Dream Temple (Millennim Records), "Dub Hypnosis" for the album Continvvm Em:t Records, and "Earth Orbit" for the dub compilation Sub Signals Interchill Records. He also released his debut solo album Walkin Target, produced by Gaudi (musician) for Interchill Records. The album included four tracks featuring the vocal stylings of Cheshire Cat from Leftfield.

== Meditronica ==
His next album was released in 2007. After remixing Raiz's album for Universal Records, he produced the new dub project Meditronica, written in collaboration with Polcari, Dub Gabriel, Raiz and Eraldo Bernocchi.

Meditronica was released worldwide in March 2009 on the London-based label, RareNoise.

== Discography ==
- Ashtech – Walkin' Target – Interchill Records 2007

=== Compilation albums ===
- Various Artists – ONE DUB – Interchill Records 2009
- Various Artists – Sub Signals Volume 1 – Interchill Records 2006

=== Productions and projects ===
- Meditronica – Meditronica – RareNoiseRecords 2009
- Raiz – Femmena Remix – Universal Records
- Gaudi: Testa 1105 – Continvvm – Em:t Records 2005
- Various Records – The Dream Temple – Milleniumrecords
- Raiz – WOP – Phoenix 2004
- Liquor Shop – Original Musico to Gianluca Sodaro's latest movie – BMG 2004
- Mauro Pagani – Domani – NUN 2003
- Luna Rossa – Soundtrack – NUN 2003
- Almamegretta – Venite Venite – BMG 2002
- Almamegretta – Imaginaria – BMG 2001
- Polina – Remix – NUN records – 2001
- Epicentro Romano – Unic Records – 2000
- Almamegretta – 4/4 – BMG 1999
- La Squadra – Good Stuff Records 1998
- Liquor Shop – Liquor Shop – IRMA Records 1998
- Jahng – 1996
