= Arezzo Wave =

Italian festival

Arezzo Wave is a famous Italian festival that takes place every July in Arezzo since 1987.

Born exclusively as a launching platform for young Italian rock groups, in its current form, the festival lasts six days and is totally free of charge. In recent years, the festival has multiplied the number of its venues in the city and accommodated an ever-increasing number of extra-musical cultural activities.

== History ==
The first edition of Arezzo Wave took place in 1987, entitled "Provincia insonne," featured sixteen emerging groups from all of Italy (without any recording contract) on four nights. The concerts took place in the Fortezza Medicea di Arezzo. In subsequent years, the festival has put faith in its "launching" work, also starting in parallel to call already-famous emerging groups onto the European scene. In 1991, the Mano Negra and the Leningrad Cowboys arrived, and the "discoveries" Afterhours and Almamegretta came. Pablo Echaurren began designing the festival's sets, which have grown thanks to the generosity and financial support of various institutes, including the French Minister of Culture Jack Lang.

In the years hence, the Arezzo Wave became a privileged venue for new Italian groups of the nineties: Mau Mau, Frankie Hi-NRG MC, Ritmo tribale ... The venue has relocated twice and the number of participants has grown to a point where it has definitely come to be accepted on the public stage. In the afternoon, another venue (the "Psycho Stage") began near the city center. Along with artists of such caliber as David Byrne, Nick Cave, Sonic Youth, Moby, Tricky, Ben Harper, the festival has continued to accommodate emerging Italian bands on the Psycho Stage, and has divided the nights between Italian ethnic music, techno, and hard rock. All the major Italian rock artists have passed through the Arezzo Wave: Max Gazzè, Daniele Silvestri, Jovanotti, CSI, Tiromancino, Bandabardò, Negrita, Marlene Kuntz, Morgan, Samuele Bersani, Carmen Consoli, Subsonica, ...

In 2006, the 20th edition took place from 11 to 16 July. In the last two editions, the festival has offered, beyond the principal venue on stage, an afternoon venue (the "Psycho Stage") and an early-bird (the "Wake-up Stage"), cabaret contests, cinema events, and comic strips, theater, concerts of classical music in central public squares of the city. Like every year, the final program will be published on official site around the month of June 2006.

For various reasons, mainly due to lack of funding from the Arezzo province, in 2007 the Arezzo Wave festival relocated to Sesto Fiorentino, a large area outside Florence, and renamed itself to Italia Wave Love Festival 2007. Despite its new name and location, this is effectively the 21st edition of Arezzo Wave.
