= Marta sui Tubi =

Italian indie rock band

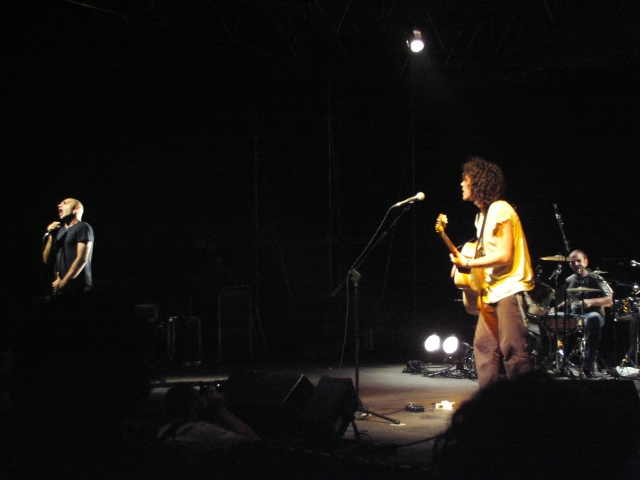

Background information
- Origin: Italy
- Genres: Indie rock
- Years active: 2002–present
- Members: Giovanni Gulino (2002–present); Carmelo Pipitone (2002–present); Ivan Paolini (2004–present)
- Past members: Paolo Pischedda (2008–15); Mattia Boschi (2008–15)

Marta sui Tubi is an Italian indie rock band formed in 2002.

They debuted in 2003 with the album Muscoli e dei and participated at the Sanremo Music Festival 2013 with the songs "Vorrei" and "Dispari".

== Discography ==
=== Studio albums ===
List of albums, with chart positions and certifications
Title	Album details	Peak chart positions
Title	Album details	ITA
Muscoli e dei	Released: 1 February 2003; Label: Eclectic Circus Records; Format: Digital download, CD	—
C'è gente che deve dormire	Released: 14 October 2005; Label: Eclectic Circus Records; Format: Digital download, CD	—
Sushi & coca	Released: 3 October 2008; Label: Tamburi Usati; Format: Digital download, CD	99
Carne con gli occhi	Released: 15 March 2011; Label: Tamburi Usati; Format: Digital download, CD	80
Cinque, la luna e le spine	Released: 14 February 2013; Label: BMG Rights Management; Format: Digital download, CD	24
Lostileostile	Released: 1 April 2016; Label: Antenna Music Factory, Believe Digital; Format: Digital download, CD	61

=== Compilations ===
List of albums, with chart positions and certifications
Title	Album details	Peak chart positions
Title	Album details	ITA
Salva gente	Released: 17 June 2014; Label: Universal Music; Format: Digital download, CD	46
