= BassLab =

- Type: Private
- Industry: Musical instruments
- Founded: Kassel, Germany
- Headquarters: Germany
- Key people: Heiko Hoepfinger
- Products: Stringed instruments, electronics
- Website: BassLab

The company BassLab produces stringed instruments, mainly basses and guitars, and also some versions of the Chapman Stick and a viola model for Ned Steinberger. Each instrument is crafted of a mixed material, "Tunable Mixed Composite".

The company was founded by the physicist Heiko Hoepfinger in Kassel, Germany. Every instrument is still hand-crafted in Germany. The products are distributed in Australia, Austria, Canada, France, Japan, Sweden, Switzerland, the United Kingdom, and the United States.

== History ==
In 1992, Heiko Hoepfinger started his first experiments to build a bass of a special mixed synthetic resin which he called "Tunable Mixed Composite". In late 1993 the first well-functioning instrument had been built, and the first public appearance of BassLab was at the Frankfurt Musikmesse (Germany) in 2001. Since then, BassLab has been represented at several trade shows and has been introduced in different international magazines. Although BassLab sells instruments all over the world, the instrument are hand-crafted in the point of origin. Today there are four basic bass models and three guitar models. BassLab also builds sticks for Emmett Chapman, violas for Ned Steinberger, and electronics in cooperation with Richter Electronics.

On June 10, 2026, Heiko Höpfinger, bass builder and the creative mind behind BassLab, passed away suddenly and unexpectedly in Kassel, Germany, at the age of 60.

== Instruments ==
The composite used produces instruments with high stability, very low weight, and impassiveness to humidity and temperature changes. The instruments are made in a single piece and are hollow throughout, with no internal bracing. The composite is not poured into a mold and not forced out. Therefore, the manufacturing process allows high ergonomic flexibility. BassLab instruments can be built almost any design asked.

In contrast to traditional carbon/graphite composites, "Tunable Mixed Composite" does not have the reputation of sounding sterile. The composite can be adjusted to the wishes of the clients. Long sustain, fast sound production, and the typical sound of hollowed instruments are just a few of the several specifications offered by BassLab.
