= Italia Wave =

The Italia Wave Love Festival is an annual music festival held in Italy. The first edition in 2007 was held from the 17th to the 22nd of July in Florence and Sesto Fiorentino, and the 2008, 2009 and 2010 editions in Livorno. In 2011 it is set to be held in Lecce.

It mainly presents rock music, although as in recent years it will also feature important artists of other styles. Continuing the tradition of Arezzo Wave, entry to the festival will be free, although after 21:00 hours a €10 ticket will be required. The festival will continue to host both upcoming bands and internationally famous ones, and a large number of non-musical cultural events.

== Stages ==
- Main Stage – all nights from 18 to 22 July – Osmannoro Sud Area - Sesto Fiorentino (FI)
- Global Stage - all nights from 18 to 22 July – Osmannoro Sud Area - Sesto Fiorentino (FI)
- Psycho Stage by Night - all nights from 18 to 22 July – Osmannoro Sud Area - Sesto Fiorentino (FI)
- Psycho Stage by Day - all afternoons from 18 to 22 July – Osmannoro Sud Area - Sesto Fiorentino (FI)
- Elettrowave Theatre – 20 and 21 July starting at 23:00, Osmannoro Sud Area - Sesto Fiorentino (FI)
- Elettrowave Club - 20 and 21 July starting at 23:00, Osmannoro Sud Area - Sesto Fiorentino (FI)
- Elettrowave Square - 20 and 21 July starting at 23:00, Osmannoro Sud Area - Sesto Fiorentino (FI)
- Toscana Wave – from 14 to 17 July, Lecce

== Lineup ==
Scissor Sisters, Mika, The Good, the Bad & the Queen, Kaiser Chiefs, !!! (chk chk chk), Mando Diao, Nitin Sawhney, Tinariwen, Chico Cesar, Clap Your Hands Say Yeah, CSS, Gocoo, Bob Geldof, Jimi Tenor, Carmen Consoli, Bugo, Vinicio Capossela, Avion Travel, Orchestra di Piazza Vittorio, Casino Royale, Pass the Mic, Bob Geldof, Associazione Axè, Blatta & Inesha, Âme, Cassius, Alex Gopher, King Britt, Editors, Groove Armada, Faithless, OK Go.

== Cultwave ==
All non-musical events are included under the CultWave title, among which are:

- Word Stage – an area dedicated to the written word;
- Speak Corner – a festival area zone where authors may promote their works or publications;
- Comics Wave – an area dealing with comics, this year special attention is given to the 25th anniversary of renowned Italian comics character Martin Mystère;
- Teatro Wave – theatre area, promoting young theatrical groups;
- Art Wave – art installations distributed across the many festival areas;
- Media Center - internet point, web 2.0, blogging, etc.;
- Wave Camp – a barcamp dealing with creator's rights, creative commons, peer to peer file sharing and online musical promotion, among other things;
- Social Wave – an area for social service associations;
- Second Wave – a contest organized on Second Life.
