= Faraualla =

Italian female vocal quartet

Faraualla is an Italian female vocal quartet from the region of Apulia, which explores vocal polyphony.

The group was formed in Bari in 1995 and consists of: Gabriella Schiavone, Teresa Vallarella, Marinella Dipalma, & Serena Fortebraccio.

The group also works with the percussionists Cesare Pastanella and Pippo D'Ambrosio.

The group explores the use of voice as a musical instrument, studying and incorporating sounds from a diverse group of places, times and cultures among which are: Apulia, Corsica, Bulgaria and Tahiti, which deal with the traditional music of gypsies, Moravians, Ars Nova, and Southern Italy.

Faraualla has performed with various artists of international renown, including the Mongolian Sainkho Namtchylak, the Italo-Palestinian Al Darawish, the American Bobby McFerrin, and the Italians Daniele Sepe and Lucilla Galeazzi. In Italy in 1999 they accompanied the singer Mango in a live concert. In the Visto Così Tour, transmitted directly on Videoitalia Live, they performed as a solo group.

== Discography ==
Faraualla recorded their first two albums under the Amiata Records record label

- Faraualla (1999)
1. Tonga
2. Vrlicko Kolo
3. Elleipseis
4. Szerelem
5. Uecumbà
6. Maha te song
7. Spirits
8. Spondo
9. Questa fanciull'amor
10. Petra
11. Eramo in campu
12. Fescenne
13. Ijsse sole
- Sind (2002)
1. Domina
2. Arecuriuriè
3. Masciare
4. Sind'
5. Popoff
6. Ninnagè
7. Orangutan
8. Viktori
9. Masciare witch mix

The following album was a live recording of a concert at Cappella Paolina del Qurinale, directly transmitted by RadioTre in December 2001 and published by Rai Trade:

- I concerti del Quirinale di RadioTre (2007)
1. Uecumbà
2. Tonga
3. Ebilembilembà
4. Uarandero
5. Petra
6. Sind'
7. Arecuriuriè
8. Fescenne
9. Ijsse sole
10. Rumelaj
11. Ninnagè
12. Popoff

This album was published under the Felmay label:

- Sospiro (2008)
1. Ci lu patiscisti
2. Il sogno di Frida
3. Rikitikitavi
4. Ki te mu
5. La notte bianca
6. Quingui
7. Auanda la cuica
8. Smilla
9. Pulsatilla
10. Il ciucciariello
- Ogni Male Fore (2013)
1. Zitt Zitt
2. Scongiuro
3. Il Canto E La Cura
4. Spina Spinella
5. Sciatavinn
6. Da La Vocc
7. Tammurriata Della Mascìa
8. La Tentazione
9. Mano Manca Mano Santa
