= Brainkiller =

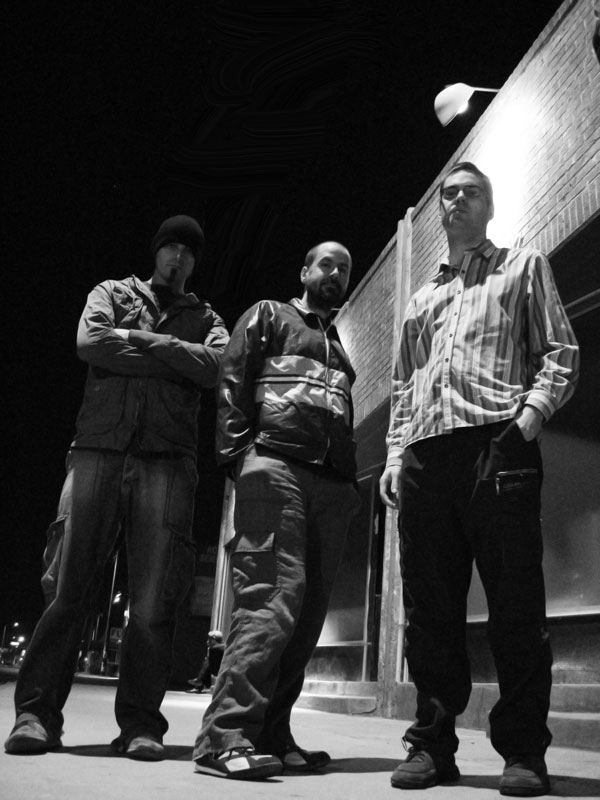

Background information
- Origin: United States, Japan, Mexico, Argentina
- Genres: Jazz
- Years active: 2000–present
- Label: RareNoise
- Members: Brian Allen; Jacob Koller; Hernán Hecht
- Website: https://www.facebook.com/brainkillermusic

Brainkiller are an international jazz/prog/psych trio consisting of trombonist Brian Allen (United States), keyboardist Jacob Koller (Japan), and drummer Hernán Hecht (Argentina).

== History ==
Brainkiller (an amalgam of their nicknames) formed in 2000 when Texas-based Allen and Phoenix native Koller met in a Canadian airport. They recorded their first album, a self-titled, self-released CD of original acoustic trombone and piano duo compositions, in 2001.

Collaborations with others soon followed, including contrabassist Mark Dresser and electronic artist backtednted as the duo regularly toured across the USA in performing arts centers, universities, new music festivals and clubs. They were awarded a residency from Houston's Diverse Works in 2003, enabling an extensive Brainkiller Trio tour with LA-based percussionist Corey Fogel. This period had the band making extensive use of electronic effects and samplers, seeking a deeper and varied timbral palette.

The duo continued performing until 2007, when Mexico City-based drummer Hernán Hecht joined Brainkiller as a permanent member. The trio recorded "The Infiltration" in Phoenix in March 2008. It was released by RareNoiseRecords in October 2010, in conjunction with a tour of Mexico. The trio combines elements of experimental jazz, rock and electronic music, among other genres.
