= Blackfield V =

Studio album by Blackfield
- Released: 10 February 2017
- Recorded: 2015–2016
- Genre: Art rock; alternative rock; progressive rock
- Length: 44:01
- Label: Kscope
- Producer: Aviv Geffen; Steven Wilson; Alan Parsons

Blackfield chronology
Blackfield IV (2013)	Blackfield V (2017)	For the Music (2020)

Singles from Blackfield V
- 1. "Family Man" Released: 8 December 2016

Blackfield V is the fifth studio album by art rock band Blackfield. Recorded over a year and a half period across 2015 and 2016, the album, initially intended for release on 18 November 2016, was later delayed to 10 February 2017. The album, the fifth between the musical partnership between Steven Wilson and Aviv Geffen, is the third released as an even collaboration between the two; while Blackfield and Blackfield II were even collaborations, Welcome to My DNA and Blackfield IV saw increased writing and musicianship from Geffen while Wilson focused on his solo albums Grace for Drowning and The Raven that Refused to Sing (And Other Stories).

== Background and recording ==
After the release of Blackfield IV and a brief tour in its support, Steven Wilson, co-founder of the group, who had already played his smallest role in the project yet, announced that he intended to leave the band altogether in 2014 to focus on his solo career. While this originally left the future of the band in question, throughout the 2015 and 2016, the band's social media accounts would release pictures of Wilson, co-founder Aviv Geffen, and music producer Alan Parsons in recording sessions in the studio. In August 2016, it was confirmed that there would be a fifth album, Wilson was still with the project, and he even contributed evenly to the sessions as he had with the band's first two albums, before he had begun to focus more on his solo career while Geffen took over more responsibilities for their second two albums. The album had been recorded on and off over the course of an 18-month period, including sessions in both England and Israel. Wilson and Geffen shared vocals, guitars, and keyboard duties, while long-time drummer Tomer Z returned to play the drum parts. Additionally, the London Session Orchestra was recruited for the string arrangements of the album. It was also announced that Parsons had produced three of the key tracks for the album.

== Themes and composition ==
The band describes the album as a loose concept album themed around the ocean and the cycle of life, flowing across thirteen songs and approximately 45 minutes of music.

== Release and promotion ==
The album was originally scheduled for release on 18 November 2016 before being delayed to 10 February 2017. No reason was cited beyond "circumstances beyond the band's control", though the album itself was complete at the time of the delay announcement. On 8 December 2016, "Family Man", "How Was Your Ride?", and "Sorrys", the second, third, and fifth songs from the album, were released.

== Track listing ==
No.	Title	Writer(s)	Lead vocals	Length
1.	"A Drop in the Ocean"	Aviv Geffen; Steven Wilson	(instrumental)	1:23
2.	"Family Man"	Geffen	Wilson	3:37
3.	"How Was Your Ride?"	Geffen	Wilson	3:58
4.	"We'll Never Be Apart"	Geffen	Geffen	2:54
5.	"Sorrys"	Geffen	Geffen	2:58
6.	"Life Is an Ocean"	Geffen; Wilson	Geffen; Wilson	3:26
7.	"Lately"	Geffen	Wilson; Alex Moshe	3:24
8.	"October"	Geffen	Wilson	3:31
9.	"The Jackal"	Geffen	Geffen; Wilson	3:56
10.	"Salt Water"	Geffen	(instrumental)	2:39
11.	"Undercover Heart"	Geffen	Geffen	4:02
12.	"Lonely Soul"	Geffen	Geffen; Moshe	3:42
13.	"From 44 to 48"	Wilson	Wilson	4:31
Total length:				44:01

== Personnel ==
Credits are adapted from the album's liner notes.

Blackfield

- Steven Wilson – lead vocals, guitar (2–4, 6, 7, 9–13), bass (4, 6, 7, 9–13), keyboards (1, 12, 13), drum programming (12), backing vocals (4, 5, 11, 12)
- Aviv Geffen – lead vocals, guitar (9, 12), bass (12), keyboards (2–12), piano (5, 12), Mellotron (6, 9), string arrangements (1, 3, 4, 7, 8, 10, 11), backing vocals (2, 3, 6, 7, 13)
- Tomer Z – drums (2–4, 6, 7, 9–11, 13), percussion (2, 3, 6)
- Eran Mitelman – keyboards (4, 9, 11), piano (3, 6, 11), Mellotron (9), Hammond organ (3)

Additional musicians

- Omri Agmon – acoustic guitar (2, 5, 7, 10), additional guitar (9)
- Mike Garson – piano (8)
- Hadar Green – bass (3)
- Alex Moshe – female vocals (7, 12), backing vocals (3, 11)
- Alan Parsons – backing vocals (3)
- The London Session Orchestra – orchestral performance (1, 3, 4, 7, 8, 10, 11)

Production

- Steven Wilson – production (1, 6, 12, 13), engineering, mixing (1, 3, 4, 8, 9, 12, 13)
- Aviv Geffen – production (2, 5, 7, 8, 10–12)
- Alan Parsons – production (3, 4, 9)
- Simon Bloor – engineering, mixing (2, 5–7, 10, 11)
- Graham Archer – engineering
- Ofer Mappa – engineering
- Yonatan Danino – engineering
- Lasse Hoile – cover art, photography
- Carl Glover – design

== Charts ==
Chart (2017)	Peak position
Austrian Albums (Ö3 Austria)	46
Belgian Albums (Ultratop Flanders)	115
Belgian Albums (Ultratop Wallonia)	118
Dutch Albums (Album Top 100)	16
Finnish Albums (Suomen virallinen lista)	43
French Albums (SNEP)	155
German Albums (Offizielle Top 100)	13
Polish Albums (ZPAV)	16
Scottish Albums (OCC)	38
Swiss Albums (Schweizer Hitparade)	48
UK Albums (OCC)	54
