= Blackfield IV =

Studio album by Blackfield
- Released: 26 August 2013
- Recorded: January–July 2012
- Genre: Art rock, pop rock
- Length: 31:22
- Label: Kscope
- Producer: Aviv Geffen

Blackfield chronology
Welcome to My DNA (2011)	Blackfield IV (2013)	Blackfield V (2017)

Blackfield IV is the fourth studio album by Blackfield, the musical collaboration by Aviv Geffen and Steven Wilson. Similar to their third album, Welcome to My DNA, Geffen has taken over more active duties on the album while Wilson focuses on his solo career. The album was released on 26 August 2013.

== Background ==
Over the course of 2010 and early 2011, the two creative directors of Blackfield were split over two musical projects; Steven Wilson wrote and recorded his second solo studio album, Grace for Drowning, and as a result, Aviv Geffen would take more creative control over Blackfield's third studio album, Welcome to My DNA. After both albums' release and promotion, in December 2011, Wilson stated that his various music projects, Blackfield included, would be put on hold, while he focused further on his solo career. Contrary to this announcement, less than a month later in January 2012, Geffen announced his intentions to release a fourth Blackfield album by as soon as May 2012. This prompted Wilson to announce that his role would continue to lessen, with Wilson acting only as a contributor and mixer. Wilson said of the band's future:

...just to clarify news elsewhere of a new Blackfield album coming this year – please note that this time my involvement will be as a contributor rather than a member. I will still be mixing the album, and maybe sing on a couple of Aviv’s songs (there will be other guest singers I understand), but with my complete blessing Blackfield is now under his sole curatorship, a process which really began with Welcome to My DNA"

Wilson later admitted that it was his own idea for Geffen to take over the project, because Wilson wanted to concentrate on his solo career in 2012 and 2013, while Geffen wanted to do another Blackfield album right away in 2012, and Wilson felt guilty about holding him back.

== Writing and recording ==
Work on the album started shortly after Geffen's initial announcement. On 29 and 30 January, both Geffen and Wilson began work on vocal and guitar parts in the studio. The two were accompanied by one of the guest vocalists that Wilson had alluded to before, which was revealed to be Vincent Cavanagh of the band Anathema, who recorded vocals for a track, "XRay".

Due to Wilson focusing on the recording of his third solo album, The Raven That Refused to Sing (And Other Stories), Wilson would not write any of the songs for the album. He only contributed lead vocals to one song, "Jupiter", though he did also contribute "a bunch of guitar parts" and "helped him arrange some of the backing vocals". Specifically, Wilson provided backing vocals and guitar to the track "Pills", and backing vocals for "Sense of Insanity". Despite his lessened role, he still said that he was "protective of the Blackfield legacy", and that the next album would "still sound like a quintessential Blackfield album." Wilson later reiterated his role on the album:

I won’t say producing [the fourth album], I am only helping [Geffen], a bit of singing, guitar, mixing whatever it takes but I am not going to tour, it’ll be too much, I’ll kill myself, would just run myself to the ground. I won't tour Blackfield anymore but I will do anything to keep the name going...I just don't think that writing the kind of style that Blackfield make is where I am at right now.

Despite Wilson's focus on his solo career, Geffen pressed forward with the album, writing around thirty tracks for the album before whittling it down to the strongest eleven tracks for the final release. On 14 June 2012 Geffen announced he was in the final mixing stages of the album with Wilson. By November 2012, Geffen stated that he roughly aimed for an April 2013 release time frame. Wilson confirmed that he sang and played guitar on several tracks, but "much less than before", that Geffen was able to get "a bunch of great singers to contribute to the record, some of whom are quite well known", and that the album would be the first that Geffen would consent to be mixed for surround sound. In June 2013, the other guest appearances were announced to including Brett Anderson of Suede, Jonathan Donahue of Mercury Rev and the aforementioned appearance of Vincent Cavanagh of Anathema.

== Themes and composition ==
While Geffen stated that the Welcome to My DNA title of their prior album was meant to symbolize his taking over the band as Wilson focused on his solo career, Geffen conversely stated that Blackfield IV's title was meant to remind the fanbase that they were still the same band, despite Wilson's lessened role.

The album's sound came from a variety of different areas. Geffen strove to keep the music a mixture of metal, pop, and symphonic pop, being influenced by bands such as Radiohead or Blonde Redhead, that cannot be pigeon-holed into one specific genre. Specific tracks possessed individual influences as well; "Jupiter" was influenced by 1970s classic rock, "After the Rain"'s electronic edge was influenced by dubstep, and "Firefly" was influenced by post-rock and indie rock, while "Pills" was an attempt to create a song that sounded like it was off of the original Blackfield album.

== Release and promotion ==
On 25 February 2013 Wilson released his third solo album, The Raven That Refused to Sing (And Other Stories). Some copies contained a compilation disc of music done by artists under record label Kscope; one track being Blackfield's "Pills", premiering half a year prior to the release of Blackfield IV. On 9 June 2013 it was announced that the fourth album would officially be titled Blackfield IV, and its release date would be 26 August 2013. The band premiered a sand art-based music video for the track "Jupiter" on 25 July 2013. The track "Pills" was made available for free download as well.

== Reception ==
Reception for the album has been mixed, with critics divided over Wilson's smaller role on the album. About.com music journalist Chad Bowar gave the album a 4 out of 5 star rating, praising it for combining "beautiful acoustic passages, luscious melodies and straightforward rock" and especially noting the orchestration and guest appearance of Vincent Cavanagh as standout features. Conversely, Bryce Ezel of PopMatters was more critical of the album, awarding it only a 5 of 10, stating that while some of the songs were good, the magic from the first two albums, Blackfield and Blackfield II, was lost due to the lack of collaboration between Geffen and Wilson on the album. "Pills", "Jupiter", and "Sense of Insanity", all tracks Wilson contributed to, were noted as standouts because "IV demonstrates that Blackfield is at its finest when it is being what it initially set out to be—not the band it now has to become because the circumstances require it to be so."

== Track listing ==
All tracks are written by Aviv Geffen.

No.	Title	Length
1.	"Pills"	3:35
2.	"Springtime"	2:24
3.	"X-Ray" (featuring Vincent Cavanagh)	2:36
4.	"Sense of Insanity"	3:24
5.	"Firefly" (featuring Brett Anderson)	2:46
6.	"The Only Fool Is Me" (featuring Jonathan Donahue)	1:54
7.	"Jupiter"	3:48
8.	"Kissed by the Devil"	3:03
9.	"Lost Souls"	2:57
10.	"Faking"	3:33
11.	"After the Rain"	1:26

== Personnel ==
Blackfield

- Aviv Geffen – vocals, guitars, keyboards
- Steven Wilson – lead vocals on "Jupiter", backing vocals on "Pills", "Sense of Insanity", and "Lost Souls"; guitars
- Seffy Efrati – bass guitar
- Tomer Z – drums, percussion
- Eran Mitelman – piano, keyboards

Guest musicians

- Vincent Cavanagh – vocals on "X-Ray"
- Brett Anderson – vocals on "Firefly"
- Jonathan Donahue – vocals on "The Only Fool Is Me"

Production

- Aviv Geffen – producer
- Steven Wilson – mixing engineer

== Charts ==
Charts (2013)	Peak position
Polish Albums (ZPAV)	8
