= Aviv Geffen (album) =

Studio album by Aviv Geffen
- Released: 28 August 2009; 19 October 2009 (UK)
- Recorded: 2009
- Genre: Alternative rock, post-punk, experimental rock, pop punk
- Length: 34:47 (International edition)
- Label: Mars
- Producer: Trevor Horn, David Andrew Sitek, Ken Nelson, Aviv Geffen

Aviv Geffen chronology
Rak Shirey Ahava (2006)	Aviv Geffen (2009)	Mr. Down & Mrs. High (2011)

Professional ratings
Review scores
Source	Rating
Classic Rock	4/10 stars

Aviv Geffen is the debut, English-language studio album by Israeli post-punk singer-songwriter Aviv Geffen, released on 19 October 2009 in the UK. Apart from one track Geffen produced himself, the album was produced by David Andrew Sitek (TV on the Radio, Yeah Yeah Yeahs), Trevor Horn (The Buggles, Pet Shop Boys, Yes) and Ken Nelson (Coldplay).

The band also features contributions from members of Aviv Geffen's side project Blackfield: Seffy Efrati on bass, Tomer Z on drums and Eran Mitelman on keyboards, all performing on the same 3 tracks, as well as Steven Wilson (guitar).

"It's Cloudy Now" was originally written and recorded by Geffen in Hebrew. Blackfield previously performed this English-language version on their debut album Blackfield. However, that version was titled "Cloudy Now" and was credited to Geffen and Steven Wilson.

== Track listings ==
All tracks are written by Aviv Geffen.

UK edition
No.	Title	Length
1.	"It Was Meant to Be a Love Song"	4:00
2.	"Black & White"	4:29
3.	"It's Cloudy Now"	3:07
4.	"It's Alright"	2:53
5.	"Berlin"	3:21
6.	"Silence"	3:27
7.	"Heroes"	2:10
8.	"The One"	3:37
9.	"Forest in My Heart"	4:03
10.	"Now or Never"	3:28
11.	"October"	3:34
12.	"It's Alright (Time Waits for No One)" (Aviv Geffen & Thrillers)	3:07
13.	"It Was Meant to Be a Love Song" (Music video)
14.	"Black & White" (Music video)

International edition
No.	Title	Length
1.	"Black & White"	4:29
2.	"It Was Meant to Be a Love Song"	4:03
3.	"Berlin"	3:22
4.	"It's Alright"	2:54
5.	"Heroes"	2:11
6.	"It's Cloudy Now"	3:04
7.	"October"	3:33
8.	"Now or Never"	3:29
9.	"The One"	3:36
10.	"Forest in My Heart"	4:05

== Personnel ==
UK edition musicians

- Aviv Geffen – lead vocals, guitar, piano, keyboards, mellotron, xylophone, producer on track 11
- David Andrew Sitek – bass, guitars, drums, keys, programming on track 1, producer and mixing on track 1
- Dan Brown– backing vocals on track 1
- Trevor Horn – bass on tracks 2, 6, 8, backing vocals on track 2, additional keyboards on track 5, producer on tracks 2, 4, 5, 6, 8, 12
- Ash Soan – drums on tracks 2, 6, 8
- Phil Palmer – acoustic guitar on tracks 2, 4, guitars on track 5
- Jamie Muhoberac – keys on track 2, additional keyboards on track 5
- Alex – backing vocals on tracks 2, 4, 8
- Steven Wilson – guitars on tracks 3, 6, 8, acoustic guitars on track 3, backing vocals on track 8
- Eran Mitelman – keyboards on tracks 3, 9, 10
- Seffy Efrati – bass on tracks 3, 9, 10
- Tomer Z– drums on tracks 3, 9, 10
- Roger McGuinn – 12 string guitar on track 4
- Pete Murray – keyboards on track 6
- Louis Jardim – percussion on track 6
- Harel Ben-Ami – guitars on track 9
- Kid – guitars on track 10
- Mike Garson – piano on track 11

Production

- Ken Nelson – producer and mixing on tracks 3, 7, 9, 10
- Chris Coady – mixing on track 1
- Robert Orton – mixing on tracks 2, 4, 5, 6, 8, 12
- Mark Phythian – mixing on tracks 3, 7, 9, 10
- Steve Orchard, Tim Weidner – mixing on track 11
- Steve Fallone – mastering
