= Im Hazman =

Studio album by Aviv Geffen
- Released: March 2006
- Recorded: 2005–2006
- Genre: Rock
- Length: 38:41
- Label: Helicon; HL8263
- Producer: Aviv Geffen, Ofer Meiri

Aviv Geffen chronology
Memento Mori (2002)	Im Hazman (2006)	Rak Shiri Ahava (2007)

Im Hazman ("As Time Goes By") is the tenth studio album by Israeli singer/songwriter rock artist Aviv Geffen, released in March 2006.

== Track listing ==
1. "Im Hazman" (With The Time) – A Léo Ferré tribute – 3:46
2. "Machar" (Tomorrow) – 3:49
3. "Alfei Anashim" (Thousands of People) – 3:43
4. "Ze Rak Halev Shekoev Lach" (Only the Heart Hurts) – 3:51
5. "Magefa" (Epidemic) – 3:50
6. "Haolam Hatachton Shel Ha'ahava" (Underground of Love) – 3:50
7. "Zoharim" (Glowing) – 4:15
8. "Bishvilech" (For You) – 3:34
9. "At Hakelev Veani" (You, Me and the Dog) – 4:16
10. "En Zman Tachat Hashemesh" (No Time Under the Sun) – 3:44

Note

- 3, 5 and 7 also recorded in English versions by Blackfield, as 1,000 People, Epidemic and Glow respectively.

== Personnel ==
- Aviv Geffen – vocals, guitar, piano, keyboards, mellotron, drums, tambourine.

The Mistakes

- Daniel Salomon – piano, keyboards, piano rhodes, vocals.
- Harel Ben Ami – electric guitar, acoustic guitar.
- Tomer Zidkiahu – drums, tambourine.
- Shlomi Zidki – bass.

Guests

- Ofer Meiri – keyboards, programming, vocals.
- Gil Sorin – vibraphone.
- Eli Magen – contrabass.
- Steven Wilson – vocals.
- Dana Adini – vocals.
- Moshe Levi – vocals.
- Downtown Session Orchestra – string instruments.
