= Metropolin =

Metropolin מטרופולין
- Origin: Tel Aviv, Israel
- Genres: Synth-pop, alternative rock
- Years active: 2005–Present
- Labels: Helicon
- Members: Ofer Meiri; Barak Gabizon; Dana Adini; Roni Alter; Amitay Asher; Michael Frost; Tomer Tsidkiyahu
- Past members: Efrat Gosh
- Website: Metropolin.net

Metropolin (Hebrew: מטרופולין) are an Israeli synth-pop band.

The band was assembled in 2005 by Ofer Meiri, an Israeli musician and music producer. He gathered several renowned Israeli musicians including Dana Berger. Efrat Gosh, although not officially a member, is the main singer on several popular tracks, and frequently plays live with the band.

The band became popular in Israel with tracks from their self-titled album Metropolin, which reached Gold status and won the 2006 Israel Album of the Year contest. These tracks, namely "Angels", "Without Saying A Word" (Shalom Hanoch cover), "Doesn't Say Anything" and "Sleeping Without Dreams", also received high amounts of airtime (broadcasting) in Israel Defense Forces Radio and Galgalatz.

== Musical style ==
Metropolin's sound features heavy use of synthesis, with more traditional rock instruments on top. Popular tracks such as "Without A Word", "Angels" and "Dreamless Sleeping" open with a synthesizer solo.

Lyrics are dark and urban. Singing is often warm and feminine, but dynamic.

== Members ==
The line up consists, as of 2008, of:

- Ofer Meiri – vocals, keyboards
- Barak Gabizon – vocals
- Dana Adini – vocals
- Roni Alter – vocals
- Amitay Asher – guitar
- Michael Frost – bass
- Tomer Tsidkiyahu – drums

== Discography ==
=== Studio albums ===
- Metropolin (2005)
- The helix ("Haslil") (2007)
- The third ("Hashlishi") (2012)

=== Singles ===
- Pigs

Chazirim / חזירים
("Metropolin", 2005)

- Doesn't Say Anything

Lo Omeret Klum / לא אומרת כלום
("Metropolin", 2005)

- Sleeping Without Dreams

Lishon B'li Lachlom / לישון בלי לחלום
(With Dana Berger. "Metropolin", 2005)

- Without Saying A Word

Bli Lomar Mila / בלי לומר מילה
("Metropolin", 2005)

- Angels (Incitement)

Malachim (Hasata) / מלאכים (הסתה)
("Metropolin", 2005)

- I Have No Place

Ain Li Makom / אין לי מקום
(With Dana Adini. "The Helix", 2008)
