= Postcard (Steven Wilson song) =

2011 song by Steven Wilson

Single by Steven Wilson

from the album Grace for Drowning
- Released: 10 October 2011
- Recorded: 2010–2011
- Length: 4:28
- Label: Kscope
- Songwriter(s): Steven Wilson
- Producer(s): Steven Wilson

Steven Wilson singles chronology
| "Stoneage Dinosaurs" (2011) | "Postcard" (2011) | "Happiness III" (2016) |

"Postcard" is the first single from Grace for Drowning, the second solo studio album by the English musician Steven Wilson. It was released digitally on 10 October 2011. The single includes the album version, a live piano/vocal version, a remix by Scottish new prog group North Atlantic Oscillation, and a remix of another track from the same album, "Index".

== Reception ==
Reception for the song has been generally positive, with critics praising it for being more melodic and accessible than much of the Grace for Drowning album. William Ruhlmann of AllMusic interpreted it to be a song about lost love, writing, "In the relatively sparse lyrics that Wilson sings with a calm, British-accented tenor, he seems melancholy at first, apparently suffering from the aftermath of a romantic breakup. 'There's nothing left for me to say or do,' he declares in 'Postcard'." Brice Ezell of PopMatters described it as one of the most accessible, melodic, and strongest songs of the album. Similarly, Metal Buzz described the song as "Wilson's attempt at Coldplay", and Alternative Matter compared it to music from Blackfield, Wilson's melodic pop rock side project. American Aftermath called it a "gorgeous ballad" that "could fill even the coldest shell of a person with emotion".

== Track listing ==
1. "Postcard" (Album Version) - 4:28
2. "Postcard" (Live Piano/Vocal Version) – 3:12
3. "Postcard" (North Atlantic Oscillation Remix) – 4:38
4. "Index" (Necro Deathmort Remix) – 5:01
