= Welcome to My DNA =

Studio album by Blackfield
- Released: 28 March 2011
- Recorded: Throughout 2010
- Studios: No Man's Land (Hemel Hempstead); Sarm West Studios (London); Pluto, Tel Aviv; Bardo, Tel Aviv
- Length: 39:35
- Label: Kscope
- Producers: Steven Wilson; Aviv Geffen; Trevor Horn

Blackfield chronology
Blackfield II (2007)	Welcome to My DNA (2011)	Blackfield IV (2013)

Professional ratings
Review scores
Source	Rating
AllMusic	3/5 stars
Reflections of Darkness	9/10 stars
Sea of Tranquility	4/5 stars
Sputnikmusic	3.5/5

Welcome to My DNA is the third studio album by Blackfield, a musical collaboration between Steven Wilson and Aviv Geffen. It was released in Europe on 28 March 2011, and released in the US on 19 April 2011, as a digi-book CD and heavyweight vinyl limited to 2000 individually numbered copies.

== Background ==
Almost all of the songs were written by Geffen, as Wilson had been working on his second solo album, Grace for Drowning, at the same time. The album's title, Welcome to My DNA, was meant to reflect Geffen's taking over creative control for the band. The musicians worked on the material together in studios in England and Israel. It marked the first time they used a real orchestra in recording. All tracks were produced by Wilson and Geffen, except for "Oxygen", which was produced by Trevor Horn. "Zigota" is a reworking of the track of the same name on Geffen's 2002 solo album Memento Mori.

The album's first and only single was "Waving", which received a music video on 21 March 2011 and a formal single release in the US on 11 April. but did not chart on any charts. However, the opening track, "Glass House", acted as a promotional single and was made available to download prior to the album's release.

== Reception ==
The album has received generally mixed reviews. AllMusic described the album as "neo-progressive Pink Floyd-meets-Tears for Fears", though conceded that "the music aims toward a majestic simplicity that it sometimes achieves". Reflections of Darkness stated it was "...a sophisticated and diverse pop/rock album and highly recommended". Sea of Tranquility also praised the album, stating that it was the band's "...most diverse, experimental, and textured release". Praise was given to Wilson for his production on the album and his solo contribution to the album "Waving".

Other reviewers were more critical. PopMatters stated that "...despite some signature characteristics of Blackfield that are present on DNA, Wilson’s choice to step back and let Geffen dominate the show had ramifications on the identity of the project itself...The old waters are beginning to run only faintly through." Many critics also panned the limited and weak lyrics in some tracks, most notably Geffen's track "Go to Hell".

The record peaked at No. 139 on the UK Albums Chart.

== Track listing ==
All tracks are written by Aviv Geffen except "Waving" by Steven Wilson.

No.	Title	Lead vocals	Length
1.	"Glass House"	Wilson	2:56
2.	"Go to Hell"	Geffen	3:03
3.	"Rising of the Tide"	Wilson, Geffen	3:47
4.	"Waving"	Wilson	3:54
5.	"Far Away"	Wilson	2:47
6.	"Dissolving with the Night"	Geffen, Wilson	4:06
7.	"Blood"	Geffen, Wilson	3:17
8.	"On the Plane"	Wilson	3:41
9.	"Oxygen"	Geffen	3:04
10.	"Zigota"	Wilson, Geffen	5:04
11.	"DNA"	Wilson, Geffen	3:56
Total length:			39:35

== Personnel ==
Band

- Steven Wilson – vocals, guitars, keyboards, string arrangements on "Waving" and "Dissolving with the Night"
- Aviv Geffen – vocals, guitars, keyboards, string arrangements on all tracks except "Waving"; "Dissolving with the Night" co-arranged with Wilson
- Eran Mitelman – piano, keyboards
- Seffy Efrat – bass
- Tomer Z – drums

=== Guest musicians ===
- Yankale Segal – tar lute, oud, baglama on "Blood"
- Trevor Horn – additional keyboards and production on "Oxygen"
