= Blackfield II =

Studio album by Blackfield
- Released: 13 February 2007
- Recorded: February – June 2006
- Genre: Art rock; progressive rock
- Length: 42:30
- Label: Snapper (Europe); Atlantic Records/We Put Out Records (US)
- Producer: Steven Wilson

Blackfield chronology
Blackfield (2004)	Blackfield II (2007)	Welcome to My DNA (2011)

Professional ratings
Review scores
Source	Rating
Allmusic	3.5/5 stars
The Aquarian	A+
Classic rock	(8/10)
Music Players	4/4 stars
PopMatters	7/10 stars
Q	3/5 stars
Rock Hard	8.5/10 stars

Blackfield II is the second studio album by the collaborative musical project Blackfield, consisting of English musician Steven Wilson and Israeli musician Aviv Geffen. It was recorded in Tel Aviv and London and released on 13 February 2007 in Europe and 6 March 2007 in the US.

"End of the World" is a cover of an older song in Hebrew, performed by Geffen and Berry Sakharof. Hebrew versions of "1,000 People" and "Epidemic" were included on Geffen's 2006 album "Im Hazman". A demo version of "Where Is My Love?" was released on the bonus disc of the limited edition of Blackfield's first album.

"Christenings" was originally written for Porcupine Tree's 2005 album, Deadwing, but was never released. Richard Barbieri and Gavin Harrison are both featured on this track.

== Track listing ==
All songs written by Aviv Geffen, except where noted.

No.	Title	Lyrics	Music	Length
1.	"Once"	Steven Wilson	Wilson	4:00
2.	"1,000 People"	Geffen/Wilson	Geffen	3:53
3.	"Miss U"			4:06
4.	"Christenings"	Wilson	Wilson	4:35
5.	"This Killer"			4:05
6.	"Epidemic"	Geffen/Wilson	Geffen	4:55
7.	"My Gift of Silence"	Wilson	Wilson	4:01
8.	"Some Day"			4:18
9.	"Where Is My Love?"			2:55
10.	"End of the World"			5:15
Total length:				42:30

== Reception ==
Q: "... an album of mournful, one-paced rock, Geffen's infatuation with Radiohead very evident in the melancholy synth-string washes. Miss U is the standout, although the Genesis-esque End of the World comes close."

== Personnel ==
Blackfield

- Aviv Geffen – keyboards, additional guitars, vocals
- Steven Wilson – guitars, additional keyboards, vocals
- Daniel Salomon – piano
- Seffy Efrati – bass guitar
- Tomer Z – drums, percussion

Vocal duties

- lead vocals: 1, 2, 4, 5, 7, 8 – Steven Wilson
- lead vocals: 3 – Aviv Geffen
- lead vocals: 6, 9, 10 – Wilson and Geffen

Guest musicians

- Ofer Meiri – additional keyboards and programming on "1,000 People"
- Harel Ben-Ami – electric and acoustic guitars on "1,000 People"
- Itamar Leshem – french horn on "1,000 People"
- Richard Barbieri – electric piano and stylophone on "Christenings"
- Gavin Harrison – drums on "Christenings"
- Daniela Pick – backing vocals on "Epidemic"
- Eran Mitelman – electric piano on "My Gift of Silence"
- String arrangements by Geffen, performed by the Downtown Session Orchestra, under the direction of Daniel Salomon

Production

- Steven Wilson – producer, mixer
- Reuven Schapira – recording engineer
- Carl Glover – artwork, photography, and design
- Robin – band photography

== Chart positions ==
- Billboard Top Heatseekers (Middle Atlantic): #9
- Billboard Top Heatseekers (Northeast): #6
- Billboard Top Heatseekers: #31
- Billboard Top Internet Albums: #25
