= Children of E.L.B. =

2010 album by Soup

Studio album by Soup
- Released: February 2010
- Genre: Post-rock; progressive
- Label: VierSieben Records
- Producer: Erlinda Viken, Hans Magnus Ryan

Soup chronology
Come on Pioneers (2008)	Children of E.L.B. (2010)	The Beauty of our Youth (2013)

Children of E.L.B. is the second official album by Norwegian band Soup. It was released in February 2010. The double CD is the first Soup release to be recorded as a band, rather than solely by multi-instrumentalist, writer and singer Erlend Viken. It is also the first studio album released by the band through How Is Annie Records, whom they had signed with in 2008.

The album was co-produced with Motorpsycho guitarist Hans Magnus Ryan. The sleeve design was by Lasse Hoile, a well-known artist in rock circles who has worked with the likes of Steven Wilson and Dream Theater.

Despite being voted album of the year in 2010 in Viken's home country of Norway by Paul A. Nordal in Panorama Media's annual music review, and being critically well received across a number of European countries, it remains a largely undiscovered classic.

== Track listing ==
All tracks written and arranged by Erlend Viken.

1. "We Share the Same Breath" – 5:22
2. "Leaving the Harbour" – 4:31
3. "In Memory of Richard Wright" – 8:41
4. "Streams" – 2:08
5. "The Roots are Decaying" – 7:13
6. "Utopia" – 4:20
7. "The Roots are Decaying Pt 2" – 4:14
8. "Playground Memories" – 7:49
9. "She Had Set Out to Find the Sun" – 8:42
10. "Surrounded by Ghosts" – 3:53
11. "Children of E.L.B. Pt 1 & 2" – 7:39
12. "Glaciers" – 2:10
13. "Northern Patriarch" – 3:34
14. "0805" – 5:19
15. "We Share the Same Breath Pt 2" – 5:50

== Personnel ==
- Erlend Aastad Viken – vocals, keyboards
- Ørjan Saur – guitars, backing vocals
- Rune Leraand – bass, backing vocals
- Sverre Leraand – drums
- Hans Magnus Ryan – additional guitar (tracks 6, 8, 11)
- Elling Snøfugl – cello (track 1)
- Audun Berg Selfjord – cello (track 4)
- Lars Magnus Steinum – violin (track 10)
