= Nathan Salomon =

Israeli musician

Nathan Salomon נתן סלומון
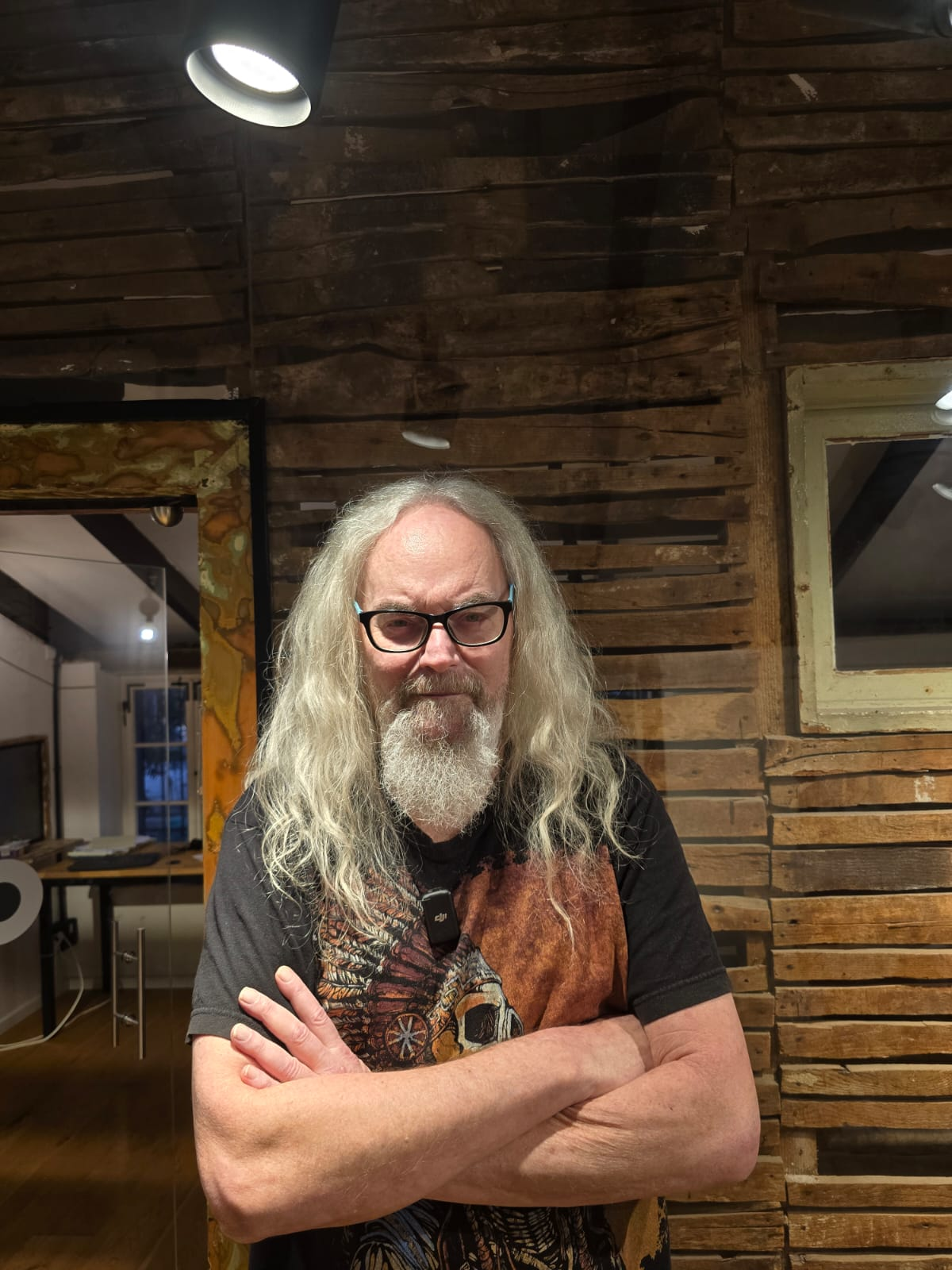
- Nathan Salomon, Dec 2025

Background information
- Occupations: Musician, Guitarist, composer, music arranger, Singer, record producer, educator, Satirist, Digital media Creator
- Formerly of: Beit HaBubot (2005–2007)

Natan Salomon (Hebrew: נתן סלומון; born 1961) is an Israeli musician, guitarist, composer, music arranger, singer, record producer, satirist, and digital-media creator.

He was among the early members of the band Beit HaBubot. He arranged, produced, and performed all the guitar parts on the band's successful debut album, Madaphim. In addition to his musical career, Salomon is active in the creation of Political satire on social media platforms.

== Biography ==
Salomon was born in 1961 and grew up in Haifa. He has a brother, the musician Daniel Salomon, and a sister. He is a graduate of a military entertainment ensemble. In 1997, he participated in the Tel Aviv Jazz Festival, performing a guitar duo focused on the works of Django Reinhardt.

During the 2000s Salomon was among the founders of Beit HaBubot. He arranged, produced, and performed all guitar parts on the band's debut album, Madaphim, released in 2007. The album achieved major success in the Israeli pop-rock scene and reached triple platinum status. Salomon performed with the band for approximately a decade.

Over the years, Salomon taught and educated in Classical music in schools throughout Israel. He performed as part of a unique teacher empowerment program and delivered a musical lecture exploring the relationship between education and music. He also taught at the Ono Academic College School of Music.

Salomon played on the album Shpuyim by Shlomo Artzi, produced albums, and composed music for theatrical productions at the Mediatheque Theatre (including As You Like It).

Salomon is also active as a digital content creator, combining subversive political satire, music, and Humor. His videos, in which he frequently delivers sharp criticism of the Israeli left, the judicial system, and the Israeli media, are presented in a parodic and provocative style. Many of his videos achieved viral success and garnered hundreds of thousands of views.

In 2020 he released a solo album titled Nathan and the Daughters of Satan, followed by another album titled Nathan Salomon and Keren Hecht.

== Musical projects ==
=== Nathan and the Daughters of Satan ===
Nathan and the Daughters of Satan is an Israeli rock band founded in 2019, identified with an energetic surf rock style, wild humor, and elements of satirical expression. It is a power trio combining powerful guitars with original lyrics.

==== Band members ====
- Nathan Salomon – lead vocalist and guitarist
- Emily Omer – bass and vocals
- Inbar Bar – drums and vocals

==== Discography ====
In 2020 the band released its debut album, Commando 315, featuring 12 tracks, including "Riding with the Devil" and "Just a Human Being".

=== Nathan Salomon and Keren Hecht ===
The album Nathan Salomon and Keren Hecht (2025) is a musical collaboration in the Indie pop genre, combining electronics, electric guitars, and vocals. Salomon produced, arranged, and performed all instruments on the album, in collaboration with Keren Hecht.

== Personal life ==
Salomon lives with his partner in Tel Aviv–Jaffa.
