= Drive Home =

EP by Steven Wilson
- Released: 21 October 2013
- Recorded: 15–21 September 2012; 23 March 2013
- Venue: Hugenottenhalle (Neu-Isenburg)
- Studio: EastWest Studios (Los Angeles)
- Genre: Progressive rock
- Length: 62:24 (DVD/Blu-ray); 50:22 (CD)
- Label: Kscope
- Producer: Steven Wilson, Alan Parsons

Steven Wilson chronology
The Raven That Refused to Sing (And Other Stories) (2013)	Drive Home (2013)	Hand. Cannot. Erase. (2015)

Drive Home is an EP released by British musician Steven Wilson, featuring music videos, previously unreleased tracks, and live renditions of several songs recorded at Hugenottenhalle, Neu-Isenburg (although erroneously credited to being in Frankfurt) on 23 March 2013. The EP, which was released on 21 October 2013, was available in two versions: DVD/CD and Blu-ray/CD.

== Reception ==
Professional ratings
Review scores
Source	Rating
AllMusic	3.5/5 stars
PopMatters	7/10

Thom Jurek of AllMusic praised the title track's "gorgeous meld of Pink Floyd's nocturnal atmospherics, the Moody Blues' melodic majesty, sprawling guitar solos, and Alan Parsons' crystalline production", while also describing the live tracks as "killer readings" which the band members "take ... far outside their studio boundaries." Although the EP would seem to be "for hardcore Wilson fans only, the video disc is alone worth the price of admission", according to Jurek.

== Track listing ==
All songs written by Steven Wilson.

DVD/Blu-ray
No.	Title	Length
1.	"Drive Home" (music video)	8:22
2.	"The Raven that Refused to Sing" (music video)	7:48
3.	"The Holy Drinker" (live in Frankfurt)	10:22
4.	"Insurgentes" (live in Frankfurt)	4:27
5.	"The Watchmaker" (live in Frankfurt)	11:50
6.	"The Raven that Refused to Sing" (live in Frankfurt)	8:09
7.	"The Birthday Party" (5.1 surround audio)
8.	"The Raven that Refused to Sing" (orchestral version, 5.1 surround audio)

CD
No.	Title	Length
1.	"Drive Home" (edit)	4:08
2.	"The Birthday Party"	3:46
3.	"The Raven that Refused to Sing" (orchestral version)	7:29
4.	"The Holy Drinker" (live in Frankfurt)	10:25
5.	"Insurgentes" (live in Frankfurt)	4:30
6.	"The Watchmaker" (live in Frankfurt)	11:52
7.	"The Raven that Refused to Sing" (live in Frankfurt)	8:12

== Personnel ==
Musicians

- Steven Wilson – vocals, keyboards, guitars, bass guitar on "The Holy Drinker"
- Nick Beggs – bass guitar, backing vocals, Chapman Stick on "The Holy Drinker"
- Guthrie Govan – lead guitar
- Adam Holzman – keyboards
- Marco Minnemann – drums
- Theo Travis – flutes, saxophones, clarinet

Additional personnel

- Strings arranged by Dave Stewart and performed by the London Session Orchestra (soloist – Perry Montague-Mason)

Production

- Steven Wilson – production, mixing
- Alan Parsons – associate producer, recording engineer
- Brendan Dekora – assistant engineer

Videos

- "Drive Home" – directed by Jess Cope; produced by Tom Kaye; edited by Topher Holland
- "The Raven that Refused to Sing" – directed by Jess Cope and Simon Cartwright; produced by Tom Kaye; edited by Topher Holland
- Live tracks – directed and edited by Bernhard Baran/B-light-pictures; cameras operated by Rüdiger Jonitz, Jochen Fink, Bernhard Baran, Dirk Meissner, Olof Kreidl, Philipp Werle, Manuel Theobald, Simon Loge

Other

- Hajo Mueller – illustrations
- Carl Glover – design
- Ray Shulman (at I-sonic) – Blu-ray/DVD authoring

== Charts ==
Chart (2013)	Peak position
Belgian Albums (Ultratop Wallonia)	158
German Albums (Offizielle Top 100)	45
Scottish Albums (OCC)	77
UK Albums (OCC)	68
UK Rock & Metal Albums (OCC)	5
