= Lasse Hoile =

Danish artist, photographer, and filmmaker

- Born: 1973 (age 52–53); Aarhus, Denmark
- Genres: Death metal, extreme metal, progressive metal, experimental rock
- Website: http://www.lassehoile.com

Lasse Hoile (born 1973 in Aarhus, Denmark) is a Danish artist, photographer and filmmaker. He has collaborated with musician Steven Wilson and his projects Porcupine Tree and Blackfield. He has also designed live visuals for US progressive metal band Dream Theater. In the mid-1990s he was the vocalist for Danish death metal band Panzerchrist.

== Career ==
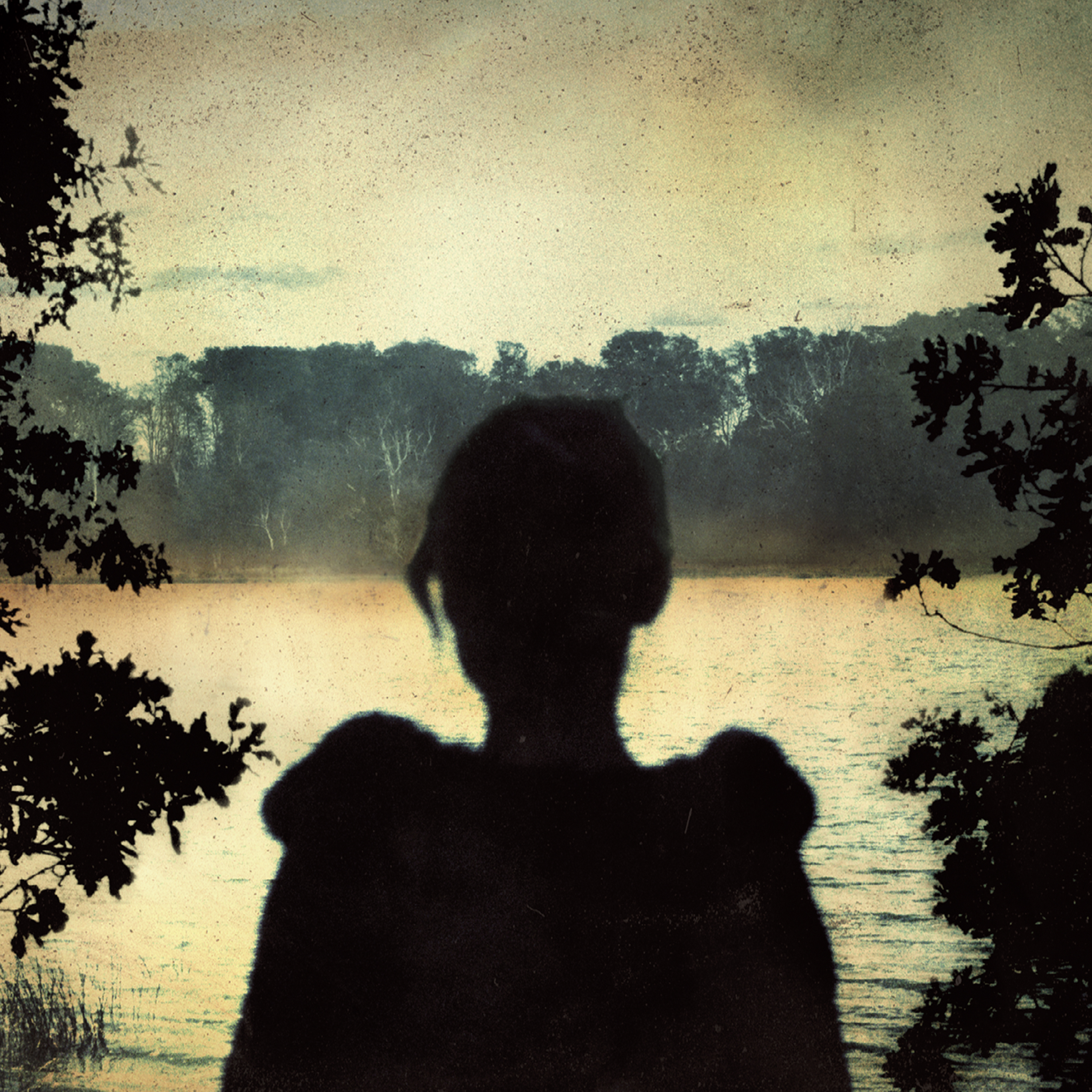
Cover of Deadwing by Porcupine Tree, designed by Hoile

Hoile started working as an editor and producing short films in 1993. Five years later in 1998, he took up photography as a hobby. Since then, he has worked on documentaries, commercials, and short films. Hoile directed videos and created a number of album sleeves for Porcupine Tree following the release of In Absentia in 2002. Later in 2005, he directed the recording of Porcupine Tree's first live performance DVD Arriving Somewhere..., which took place at Park West, Chicago. He directed Porcupine Tree's music video for the song "Fear of a Blank Planet" and has also worked on cover art for Steven Wilson's solo work. Hoile designed the cover art for Porcupine Tree's studio album The Incident, released in September 2009. He composed and directed the music video for the album's single, "Time Flies", which was the featured "Video of the Week" on iTunes USA (October 19–25, 2009).

Hoile took part in the recording, editing, and direction of some of Blackfield's live shows, including Blackfield Live in NY. He has worked with Israeli singer Aviv Geffen on both live visuals and music videos such as Black and White shot at Abbey Road Studios in London, during the summer of 2007. He was responsible for visual projections for the Danish group TV-2 during the tour for their album De første kærester på månen. Hoile edited and directed two music videos for Opeth: "Porcelain Heart" and "Burden" from their album Watershed, released in 2008. Hoile has also designed visuals for the band's live performances. He was responsible for the artwork for the Norwegian post-rock band Soup's albums Children of E.L.B. (2010) and The Beauty of Our Youth (2013).

== Personal life ==
In December 2017, Lasse Hoile married Alina Hoile, a visual artist from Russia, mostly specializing in digital illustration. They divorced in 2019.

== Discography ==
With Panzerchrist:

- Outpost Fort Europa (1999/Serious)
- Six Seconds Kill (1996/Serious)

== Bibliography ==
- 2015 Glover, Carl and Hoile, Lasse. Index, (Flood Gallery Publishing) ISBN 0992836638
