= Aviv (film) =

2003 Israeli documentary film

- אביב
- Directed by: Tomer Heymann
- Written by: Tomer Heymann
- Release date: 1 April 2003
- Running time: 80 minutes
- Country: Israel
- Language: Hebrew with English subtitles

Aviv (Hebrew: אביב) is a 2003 documentary film about the Israeli singer/songwriter Aviv Geffen.

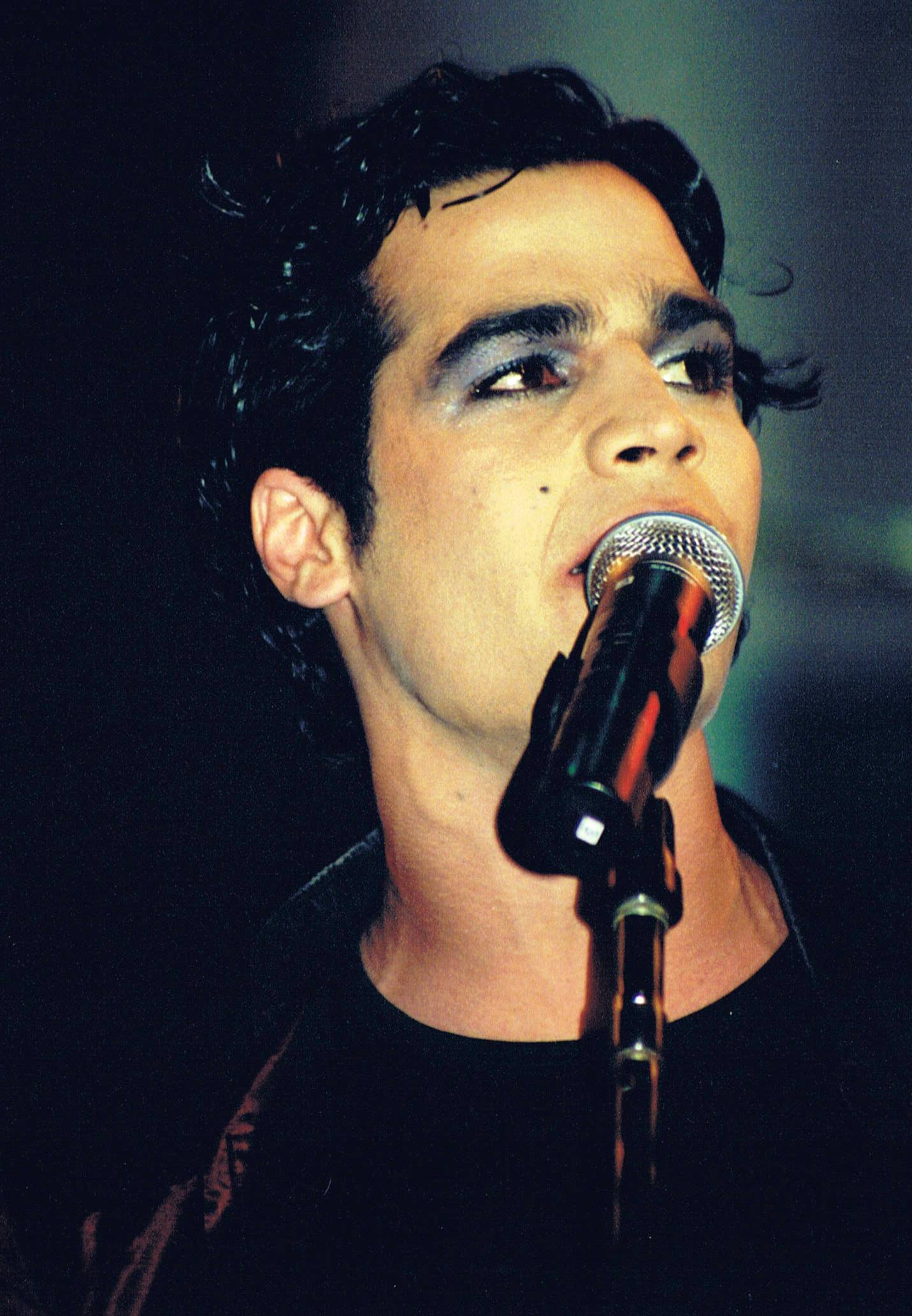
Aviv Geffen

The film focuses on the life story of the Israeli singer/songwriter Aviv Geffen, who developed from an awkward little boy who was neglected by parents that "would rather buy hash than toys" into a nationally celebrated musician. The film combines old home videos, footage from on stage performances and private interviews in order to track Aviv Geffen's musical success and explain his complex personality.

== See also ==
- Israeli rock
