= Soup (band) =

Norwegian post-rock band

- Soup live at Blaest Sept 2013

Background information
- Origin: Trondheim, Norway
- Genres: Post-rock; progressive rock; alternative rock; neo-prog; new prog
- Years active: 2004–present
- Labels: How Is Annie; Crisping Glover
- Members: Erlend Viken; Ørjan Langnes; Jan Tore Megård; Øystein Megård; Espen Berge
- Past members: Pål Ramsøy-Halle; Thomas Nyborg; Ørjan Saur; Rune Leraand; Sverre Leraand
- Website: Official homepage at the Wayback Machine (archived October 21, 2021)

Soup are a post-rock band from Trondheim, Norway, founded in 2004 by the Norwegian-based multi-instrumentalist Erlend Viken as an outlet for his songwriting and compositional talents. Soup's music has been likened by some critics to that of Steven Wilson, Sigur Rós, Mogwai, and Explosions in the Sky, among others.

== Discography ==
- Give It an Empire (2004)
- Come On Pioneers (2006)
- Children of E.L.B. (2010)
- Entropia (2012)
- The Beauty of Our Youth (2013)
- DUUN (2013)
- Remedies (2017)
- Live Cuts (2018)
- Visions (2021)
