= The Raven That Refused to Sing (And Other Stories) =

Studio album by Steven Wilson
- Released: 25 February 2013
- Recorded: 15–21 September 2012; 17 October 2012
- Studios: EastWest Studios, Los Angeles; Angel Recording Studios, London
- Genres: Progressive rock; jazz fusion; art rock
- Length: 54:43
- Label: Kscope
- Producers: Steven Wilson; Alan Parsons

Steven Wilson chronology
Grace for Drowning (2011)	The Raven That Refused to Sing (And Other Stories) (2013)	Drive Home (2013)

The Raven That Refused to Sing (And Other Stories) is the third solo album by British musician Steven Wilson, released by Kscope Music Records on 25 February 2013. Each track on the album is based on a story of the supernatural. Alan Parsons, who had previously been involved in the creation of Pink Floyd's The Dark Side of the Moon, was responsible for engineering the album.

A deluxe, 4-disc edition of the album was released as well, which included a 128-page book of lyrics and ghost stories, with illustrations by Hajo Mueller. In addition to this, the album is also available in stand alone double-vinyl, CD and Blu-ray editions. The album was generally well received critically, and has sold over 100,000 copies.

== Background ==
After finishing the touring cycle for Porcupine Tree's The Incident in 2010, Wilson would spend the rest of the year, and 2011, recording and releasing his second solo album, Grace for Drowning, and Blackfield's third album Welcome to my DNA. While initially planning on returning to Porcupine Tree in "early 2012", this soon changed, with Wilson announcing that he would continue to focus his future on his solo career. This new focus included a second leg of touring in support of Grace for Drowning, in the first half of 2012, and then returning to the studio with the live band to record a third solo album, aiming for an early 2013 release, with plans for touring in support of the album throughout 2013.

=== Writing and recording ===
"Luminol" was first performed by Wilson and his band on the last show of the first half of his Grace for Drowning tour. The song takes its inspiration from a busker, who, according to Wilson, is "there every single day. It doesn’t matter what the weather is like; he’s always there, playing his acoustic guitar and singing these songs. Snow, rain, gale force wind – nothing will stop him from being in his spot. ... He’s the kind of guy who is so set in his routine that even death wouldn’t stop him." Wilson considers the notion "that somebody could be a ghost in life, as well as a ghost in death, somebody who’s completely ignored even in their lifetime – it hardly makes a difference; and death doesn’t make a difference, either; it doesn’t break the routine."

"Drive Home" is based on a suggestion from illustrator Hajo Mueller. It is "about a couple driving along in a car at night, very much in love; the guy is driving, and his partner – his wife or girlfriend or whoever she is – is in the passenger seat, and the next minute she’s gone." The ghost of the man's partner eventually returns, "saying, 'I’m going to remind you now what happened that night.' There was a terrible car accident, and she died, etcetera, etcetera – again, the idea of trauma leading to a missing part of this guy's life. He can't deal with the reality of what happened, so he blocks it out – like taking a piece of tape and editing a big chunk out of it."

According to Wilson, "The Holy Drinker" concerns "a guy who’s very pious, very religious, preachy and self-righteous. I’m thinking of TV evangelist-types – guys who are prepared to tell people that they’re living their lives wrong and that they’re missing something because they don’t believe in God or whatever it is." The man, who, despite criticising other people's lifestyles, is himself an alcoholic, unwittingly challenges the Devil to a drinking competition, with disastrous consequences: "Of course, you can’t beat the Devil at a drinking competition – you can’t beat the Devil at anything – and so he loses. ... He gets dragged to Hell."

"The Pin Drop" addresses "the concept that you can be with someone because it’s comfortable and convenient, not because there’s any love or empathy." Wilson explains that "The song is basically sung by the wife. She’s dead, she’s been thrown in the river by the husband, and she’s floating down in the river while singing this song – from beyond death, beyond the grave, as it were." The song considers "The idea... that sometimes in a relationship there can be so much tension, so much unspoken resentment and hatred, that the tiniest thing can set off a violent episode, and in this case, one that ends in tragedy. The sound of a pin dropping on a floor can be the thing that instigates the fury."

The fifth track on the album explores "the story of the watchmaker, the guy who is meticulous about his craft, but he never has any kind of emotional outburst, nor does he express violence or any extreme emotions whatsoever." It concerns "a couple who have been together for 50 years or more, purely because it was convenient and comfortable." Wilson explains that "The watchmaker ends up killing his wife and burying her under the floorboards of his workshop. But, of course, she comes back, because she’s been with him for 50 years; she’s not going to leave him now." The song concludes when "the wife comes back to take him with her, which", Wilson suggests, "is another classic ghost story, in a way."

The title track explores the story of "an old man at the end of his life who is waiting to die. He thinks back to a time in his childhood when he was incredibly close to his older sister. She was everything to him, and he was everything to her. Unfortunately, she died when they were both very young." The man becomes convinced that a raven, who visits the man's garden, is something of "a symbol or a manifestation of his sister. The thing is, his sister would sing to him whenever he was afraid or insecure, and it was a calming influence on him. In his ignorance, he decides that if he can get the raven to sing to him, it will be the final proof that this is, in fact, his sister who has come back to take him with her to the next life."

=== Release ===
A music video for "The Raven That Refused to Sing" was released on 8 February 2013. The video, based on Hajo Mueller's artwork, was directed by Jess Cope and Simon Cartwright, who were also responsible for the video for Storm Corrosion's "Drag Ropes". The album was released on 25 February 2013.

== Reception ==
Professional ratings
Aggregate scores
Source	Rating
Metacritic	77/100
Review scores
Source	Rating
AllMusic	4/5 stars
Clash	4.5/5 stars
Classic Rock	4.5/5 stars
The Guardian	5/5 stars
Metal Hammer	4.5/5 stars
musicOMH	3.5/5 stars
PopMatters	7/10
Q	4/5 stars
Rock Hard	9/10
Sputnikmusic	4.2/5

The album was well-received. The Guardian praised the album for being "stripped-down art rock thud before morphing seamlessly into all manner of wildly evocative soundscapes, melodic crescendos and mellotron-drenched fever dreams ... this album shows Wilson to be one of modern rock's most cunning and soulful protagonists." AllMusic deemed it "the best of Wilson's three solo projects", stating that the album is "skillfully written music with expertly arranged compositions of color, nuance, texture, dynamics, narrative, and artfulness played by a group of stellar musicians."

=== Awards ===
The Raven That Refused to Sing (And Other Stories) won the "Album of the Year" category at the 2013 Progressive Music Awards. It has also been nominated for the same category in the Classic Rock Roll of Honour. In 2015 the album was listed as number 2 on the Prog Reports top 50 prog albums of 1990–2015.

== Track listing ==
All tracks are written by Steven Wilson.

No.	Title	Length
1.	"Luminol"	12:10
2.	"Drive Home"	7:37
3.	"The Holy Drinker"	10:13
4.	"The Pin Drop"	5:03
5.	"The Watchmaker"	11:42
6.	"The Raven That Refused to Sing"	7:57

Deluxe edition disc 2 (CD)
No.	Title	Length
1.	"Luminol" (demo)	13:06
2.	"Drive Home" (demo)	6:57
3.	"The Holy Drinker" (demo)	9:37
4.	"Clock Song" (unused idea)	4:31
5.	"The Pin Drop" (demo)	5:15
6.	"The Watchmaker" (demo)	12:26
7.	"The Raven That Refused to Sing" (demo)	8:00

Deluxe edition disc 3 (DVD-V/Blu-ray)
No.	Title	Length
1.	"Luminol" (5.1 mix)	12:10
2.	"Drive Home" (5.1 mix)	7:37
3.	"The Holy Drinker" (5.1 mix)	10:14
4.	"The Pin Drop" (5.1 mix)	5:03
5.	"The Watchmaker" (5.1 mix)	11:42
6.	"The Raven That Refused to Sing" (5.1 mix)	7:57

Deluxe edition disc 4 (Blu-ray)
No.	Title	Length
1.	"Luminol" (instrumental)
2.	"Drive Home" (instrumental)
3.	"The Holy Drinker" (instrumental)
4.	"The Pin Drop" (instrumental)
5.	"The Watchmaker" (instrumental)
6.	"The Raven That Refused to Sing" (instrumental)
7.	"Drive Home" (lounge version)

== Personnel ==
Band

- Steven Wilson – lead vocals, mellotron, keyboards, guitars, bass guitar on "The Holy Drinker"
- Guthrie Govan – lead guitar
- Nick Beggs – bass guitar, Chapman Stick on "The Holy Drinker", backing vocals
- Adam Holzman – keyboards, Hammond organ, piano, minimoog
- Marco Minnemann – drums, percussion
- Theo Travis – flute, saxophone, clarinet

Additional musicians

- Jakko Jakszyk – additional vocals on "Luminol" and "The Watchmaker"
- Alan Parsons – wah-wah guitar on "The Holy Drinker"
- Strings arranged by Dave Stewart, performed by the London Session Orchestra and recorded at Angel Studio 17 October 2012 (Soloist – Perry Montague-Mason)
- Niko Tsonev – Guitar solo on "The Watchmaker (demo)" and additional guitars on "Luminol (demo)"

Production

- Steven Wilson – producer, mixing
- Alan Parsons – associate producer, recording engineer
- Brendan Dekora – assistant engineer

== Charts ==
Chart (2013)	Peak position
Austrian Albums (Ö3 Austria)	23
Belgian Albums (Ultratop Flanders)	61
Belgian Albums (Ultratop Wallonia)	47
Dutch Albums (Album Top 100)	16
Finnish Albums (Suomen virallinen lista)	17
French Albums (SNEP)	69
German Albums (Offizielle Top 100)	3
Hungarian Albums (Mahasz)	34
Italian Albums (FIMI)	94
Norwegian Albums (VG-lista)	17
Polish Albums (ZPAV)	25
Spanish Albums (Promusicae)	47
Swedish Albums (Sverigetopplistan)	38
Swiss Albums (Schweizer Hitparade)	62
UK Albums (OCC)	28
UK Rock & Metal Albums (Official Charts)	1
US Billboard 200	57
