= Grace for Drowning =

Studio album by Steven Wilson
- Released: 26 September 2011
- Recorded: January 2010 – June 2011
- Studio: No Man's Land (Hemel Hempstead); Koolworld (Luton); Angel Recording Studios (London) various locations in the UK, United States and Germany
- Genre: Progressive rock; experimental rock; jazz fusion
- Length: 83:01
- Label: Kscope
- Producer: Steven Wilson

Steven Wilson chronology
Insurgentes (2008)	Grace for Drowning (2011)	The Raven That Refused to Sing (And Other Stories) (2013)

Deluxe Edition
- 120-page deluxe edition hardback book

Singles from Grace for Drowning
- 1. "Postcard" Released: 10 October 2011

Grace for Drowning is the second solo studio album by Steven Wilson, producer, songwriter, and frontman of Porcupine Tree. It was released by Kscope on 26 September 2011 as a double album, and his first album after Porcupine Tree's dissolution in 2010. The album received a nomination at the 54th Annual Grammy Awards for Best Surround Sound Album.

== Background ==
After the release of his first solo album, Insurgentes, Steven Wilson spent time on a number of his other projects. These include Porcupine Tree's album The Incident in 2009, Blackfield's third album Welcome to My DNA, on 28 March 2011, and an ongoing project with Mikael Åkerfeldt (the leader of the band Opeth) named Storm Corrosion. "Cut Ribbon" was a song written in 2001 for a collaboration with Åkerfeldt, but it didn't fit the style of what Wilson was doing at the time. Wilson eventually released the song on his SoundCloud account (with Gavin Harrison on drums), having completed the recording during the Grace For Drowning sessions. However, among all these projects, in 2010, he announced that he had started working on his second solo album as well.

In early June 2011, Wilson launched a minisite for the new album revealing the album's name and album art photographed by his longtime collaborator Lasse Hoile. Additionally, a free download of the track "Remainder the Black Dog" was also added. Sound and Vision magazine's website premiered the video of "Track One" on 10 August 2011. Not long after, Yahoo! Music debuted the music video for "Index". On 16 August, WNYC's website premiered a free download for the radio edit of "Like Dust I Have Cleared From My Eye". A video clip for "Remainder the Black Dog" was finally released on 31 August, through Guitar World magazine's website.

Upon completion of the album, Wilson said:

"'Insurgentes' was an important step for me into something new. This record takes that as a starting point, but it’s more experimental and more eclectic. For me the golden period for music was the late sixties and early seventies, when the album became the primary means of artistic expression, when musicians liberated themselves from the 3 minute pop song format, and started to draw on jazz and classical music especially, combining it with the spirit of psychedelia to create "journeys in sound" I guess you could call them. So without being retro, my album is a kind of homage to that spirit. There’s everything from [Ennio] Morricone-esque film themes to choral music to piano ballads to a 23 minute progressive jazz –inspired piece. I've actually used a few jazz musicians this time, which is something I picked up from my work remixing the King Crimson records"

The special edition of the album was released on Blu-ray video disc with the music playing in 5.1 surround sound. There are accompanying visuals and videos for each track.

The track Raider II is based on the murders of the "BTK killer", Dennis Rader.

== Critical reception ==
Professional ratings
Review scores
Source	Rating
AllMusic	3.5/5 stars
Classic Rock	4/5 stars
Mojo	4/5 stars
Ox-Fanzine	4.5/5 stars
PopMatters	8/10 stars
Rolling Stone	4/5 stars

Reception for the album was generally favourable. Ben Bland of Stereoboard wrote positively of the album, stating "For a work so defiantly widescreen in its intentions as this, it is truly remarkable that there is nothing that could, or rather should, be accused of being filler or being over the top." William Ruhlmann from AllMusic gave a mixed review to the album and compared it to Wilson's other projects, Porcupine Tree and Bass Communion, saying "Grace for Drowning has a particular conception in terms of its emotional journey from sadness through anger to acceptance, but it is also just another in a lengthy discography of albums by Wilson under various names in relatively similar styles". Brice Ezell of PopMatters gave a very positive review to the album, scoring it 8 out of 10. He wrote that "[Wilson] may remain a divisive musical personality, but Grace for Drowning is such a fine listen that even the most adamantly opposed listener has to at least give him style points, both for the artistic presentation of the album and the music within".

== Track listing ==
All tracks are written by Steven Wilson.

Disc 1: Deform to Form a Star
No.	Title	Length
1.	"Grace for Drowning"	2:06
2.	"Sectarian" (instrumental)	7:41
3.	"Deform to Form a Star"	7:51
4.	"No Part of Me"	5:45
5.	"Postcard"	4:29
6.	"Raider Prelude" (instrumental)	2:23
7.	"Remainder the Black Dog"	9:27
Total length:		39:38

Disc 2: Like Dust I Have Cleared from My Eye
No.	Title	Length
1.	"Belle de jour" (instrumental)	2:59
2.	"Index"	4:49
3.	"Track One"	4:16
4.	"Raider II"	23:21
5.	"Like Dust I Have Cleared from My Eye"	8:01
Total length:		43:23

Disc 3: The Map (Deluxe Edition only; Demos + Out-Takes)
No.	Title	Length
1.	"Home in Negative"	3:00
2.	"Fluid Tap"	5:45
3.	"The Map"	3:30
4.	"Raider Acceleration"	6:15
5.	"Black Dog Throwbacks"	2:30
6.	"Raider II" (demo version)	21:15

Blu-ray bonus tracks
No.	Title	Length
1.	"Home in Negative"	3:03
2.	"Fluid Tap"	5:45
3.	"Sectarian" (demo)	9:06
4.	"Deform to Form a Star" (demo)	7:09
5.	"No Part of Me" (demo)	5:59
6.	"Remainder the Black Dog" (video)	9:29
7.	"Remainder the Black Dog" (demo)	9:17
8.	"Belle de jour" (video)	2:59
9.	"Index" (video)	4:49
10.	"Track One" (video)	4:10
11.	"Raider II" (demo)	21:09
12.	"Like Dust I Have Cleared from My Eye" (video)	8:02
13.	"Like Dust I Have Cleared from My Eye" (demo)	5:05

== Personnel ==
Credits adapted from the official website

Managerial

- Andy Leff – Acme Music
- Alex Leeks – assistant

Technical and production

- Steven Wilson – production, mixing
- Pat Mastelotto – additional production, electronic drums on "No Part of Me" and "Index"
- Dave Stewart – string & choir arrangements
- Mat Collis – engineering
- Paschal Byrne – mastering

Visuals and imagery

- Lasse Hoile – photography, film director
- Bettina Ejlersen – photography assistant
- Carl Glover – art director
- Ray Shulman – Blu-ray authoring

Sounding

- Steven Wilson – vocals on all tracks except "Sectarian", "Raider Prelude" and "Belle de Jour"
- Dave Kerzner – sound design on "Raider II"
- Synergy Vocals – choir on "Postcard", "Raider Prelude" and "Raider II"

Musicians

- Steven Wilson – vocals (CD1 tracks 1, 3–5 and 7 / CD2 2–5), keys (CD1 tracks 1–5 and 7 / CD2 1–5), guitars (CD1 tracks 2, 3, and 5 / CD2 tracks 1–5), autoharp (CD1 track 2 / CD2 tracks 1, 2, 5), bass guitar (CD1 tracks 2 and 5 / CD2 tracks 1 and 4), percussion (CD1 track 4 / CD2 track 4), piano (CD1 tracks 5–7 / CD2 tracks 4 and 5), gong (CD1 track 6), glockenspiel (CD1 track 7), programming (CD2 track 2), harmonium (CD2 tracks 4 and 5)
- Jordan Rudess – piano (CD1 tracks 1 and 3 / CD2 track 4)
- Theo Travis – saxophone (CD1 tracks 2, 4 and 7 / CD2 track 4), clarinet (CD1 track 3 and 7 / CD2 track 4), flute (CD1 track 7 / CD2 track 4)
- Ben Castle – clarinet (CD1 track 2)
- Nick Beggs – Chapman stick (CD1 tracks 2 and 7 / CD2 track 4), bass guitar (CD1 tracks 4 and 7 / CD2 track 4)
- Tony Levin – bass guitar (CD1 track 3 / CD2 track 5)
- Nic France – drums (CD1 track 2–3, 5 and 7 / CD2 track 3–5)
- Pat Mastelotto – acoustic and electronic drums (CD1 track 4 / CD2 track 2)
- Markus Reuter – U8 touch guitar (CD1 track 4)
- Trey Gunn – warr guitar and bass guitar (CD1 track 4)
- The London Session Orchestra – strings (CD1 tracks 4 and 5 / CD2 tracks 1 and 2)
- Steve Hackett – guitar (CD1 track 7)
- Mike Outram – guitar (CD2 track 4)
- Sand Snowman – guitar (CD2 track 4)

- Deluxe Edition also contains:
  - 120-page hardback book.
  - Blu-ray with 5.1 surround sound mix, high resolution stereo and additional demos.
  - Blu-ray also contains films for five tracks (directed by Lasse Hoile), photo galleries, handwritten notes and lyrics.

== DVD ==
Wilson and longtime collaborator Lasse Hoile announced in late August 2012 that a DVD, filmed live in Mexico City on the Grace for Drowning tour, would be released on 24 September 2012.

== Tour ==
Touring band members included drummer Marco Minnemann, bassist and backing vocalist Nick Beggs, guitarists Aziz Ibrahim (First European leg only), John Wesley (First US leg only), and Niko Tsonev (Second leg), keyboardist Adam Holzman, and Theo Travis on flute, saxes and clarinet. Drummer/keyboardist Gary Husband was originally announced on keys, but pulled out for medical reasons. Ibrahim was unable to tour in the US due to visa problems.

=== First leg ===
Date	City	Country	Venue
Europe
20 October 2011	Poznań	Poland	Eskulap
21 October 2011	Kraków	Poland	Wisla Hall
22 October 2011	Berlin	Germany	Heimathafen
23 October 2011	Munich	Germany	Muffathalle
25 October 2011	Amsterdam	Netherlands	Paradiso
26 October 2011	Paris	France	Bataclan
27 October 2011	Cologne	Germany	Live Music Hall
28 October 2011	Hamburg	Germany	Markthalle
30 October 2011	Zoetermeer	Netherlands	Boerderij
31 October 2011	London	United Kingdom	O_{2} Shepherd's Bush Empire
United States and Canada
8 November 2011	Orlando	United States	House of Blues
10 November 2011	Baltimore	United States	Rams Head Live!
11 November 2011	New York City	United States	Best Buy Theater
12 November 2011	Philadelphia	United States	Temple Performing Arts Center
13 November 2011	Boston	United States	Berklee Performance Center
15 November 2011	Montreal	Canada	Corona
16 November 2011	Toronto	Canada	The Opera House
18 November 2011	Chicago	United States	Park West

=== Second leg ===
"Luminol", from the then-forthcoming album The Raven That Refused to Sing (And Other Stories) was introduced by Wilson in January 2012 and added to the set list for the second leg of the tour.

Date	City	Country	Venue
United States and Mexico
4 April 2012	Seattle	United States	Showbox
6 April 2012	San Francisco	United States	The Fillmore
7 April 2012	Los Angeles	United States	House of Blues
9 April 2012	Dallas	United States	House of Blues
13 April 2012	Mexico City	Mexico	Metropolitan
South America
15 April 2012	Caracas	Venezuela	Hotel Eurobuilding
17 April 2012	Santiago	Chile	Teatro Oriente
18 April 2012	Santiago	Chile	Teatro Caupolicán
19 April 2012	Buenos Aires	Argentina	Teatro Flores
21 April 2012	São Paulo	Brazil	Via Marquês
Europe
25 April 2012	Malmö	Sweden	KB
26 April 2012	Stockholm	Sweden	Gota Kallare
28 April 2012	Bergen	Norway	Peer Gynt
29 April 2012	Oslo	Norway	Rockefeller
30 April 2012	Copenhagen	Denmark	Amager Bio
2 May 2012	Tilburg	Netherlands	013
3 May 2012	Mannheim	Germany	Alte Feuerwache
4 May 2012	Paris	France	Le Trianon
6 May 2012	Saarbrücken	Germany	Garage
7 May 2012	Stuttgart	Germany	Theaterhaus
9 May 2012	Pratteln	Switzerland	Z7
10 May 2012	Milan	Italy	Alcatraz
11 May 2012	Rome	Italy	Orion
13 May 2012	Dortmund	Germany	FZW
14 May 2012	Brussels	Belgium	AB
15 May 2012	London	United Kingdom	Shepherd's Bush Empire

== Charts ==
Country	Peak Position
Netherlands	22
Poland	7
Italy	45
Switzerland	54
France	96
Belgium	76
Austria	40
Finland	30
Germany	22
United Kingdom	34
U.S. Billboard 200	85
U.S. Independent Albums	12
U.S. Top Rock Albums	19

== Awards ==
=== Grammy Awards ===
Year	Nominee / work	Award	Result
2012	Grace For Drowning	Best Surround Sound Album	Nominated

=== Progressive Music Awards ===
Year	Nominee / work	Award	Result
2012	"Raider II"	Anthem	Nominated
2012	Grace for Drowning (Deluxe Edition)	Grand Design	Nominated
