= Daniel Salomon (musician) =

Israeli pop rock singer and musician (born 1973)

Daniel Salomon דניאל סלומון
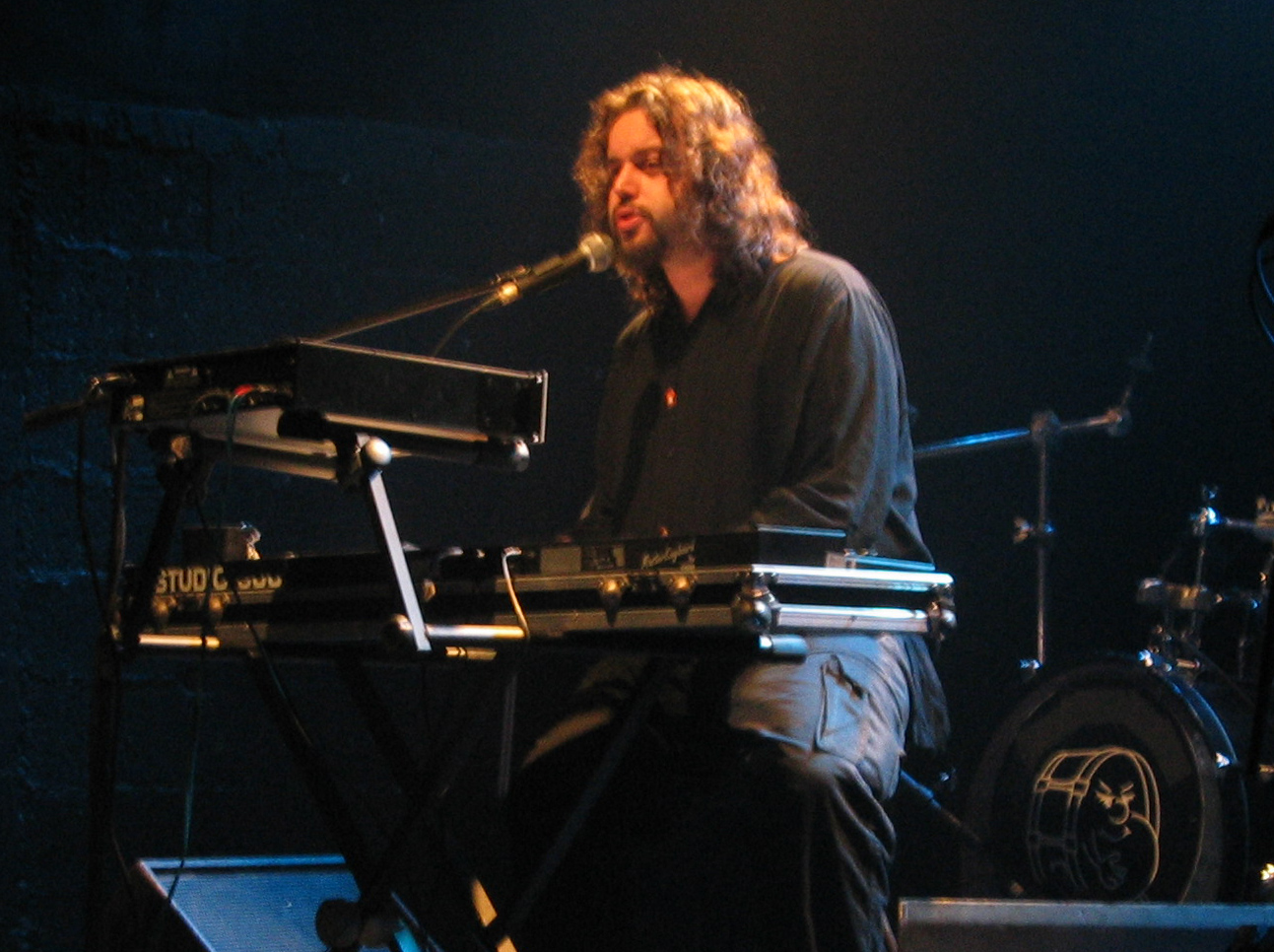
- Daniel Salomon in concert, 2003

Background information
- Born: 1973 (age 52–53); Haifa, Israel
- Genres: Pop-rock; piano rock; soundtrack
- Occupation: Musician
- Instruments: Vocals; piano; keyboards
- Years active: 1998–present
- Formerly of: Blackfield

Daniel Salomon (Hebrew: דניאל סלומון) is an Israeli pop rock singer and musician.

== Biography ==
Daniel Salomon was born and raised in Haifa. He has an older brother and sister; his brother is Israeli musician and composer Nathan Salomon. He has been playing the piano since the age of six and began writing music at age 12. He studied composition and orchestral arrangements with Prof. Isaac Sadai.

== Music career ==
At the age of 25, he started his professional career with Israeli rocker, Aviv Geffen, serving as Geffen's piano player and as the orchestral arranger on Geffen's albums. Later on, he joined Blackfield, led by Geffen and Steven Wilson. In 2002 he released his first solo album (the self-titled "Daniel Salomon") which produced several Israeli radio hits ("Better", "coming from pain") Salomon won the "Composer of the year" award from the Israeli Composers' Society.

In 2005, Salomon released his second solo album, "So Many Ways". Notable songs from this album include "Love" and the titular "So Many Ways", a duet with then-girlfriend Dana Adini. The album achieved gold status. Salomon's third solo album – "Haifa 87" was released in August 2007 and generated a hit single, "Could It Be".

Salomon has composed music for the theater, including for Israel's National Theatre as well as for The Stage theatre (London). He also wrote the score and songs for the film "The Secrets" (a French / Israeli co-production; directed by Avi Nesher). In 2007, Salomon worked on "Shfuyim" (Sane) by Shlomo Artzi. He joined the production of a Leonard Cohen tribute as musical director; the concert was first played at the Israel Festival in Jerusalem.

In 2021 he wrote the theme song to the series Beauty Queen of Jerusalem.

== Discography ==
- Daniel Salomon (2002)
- Rabot Hadrachim (There are many ways) (2005)
- Haifa 87 (2007)
- Geut (2010)

=== With Other Artists ===
- Blackfield (2004)
- Blackfield II (2007)

Shlomo Artzi – "Shfoiim" Sheila Ferber – Matok Shahor Aviv Geffen – white nights, memento mori, jouerny diary, with time

== See also ==
- Music of Israel
