= Aviv Geffen =

Israeli musician (born 1973)

Aviv Geffen אביב גפן
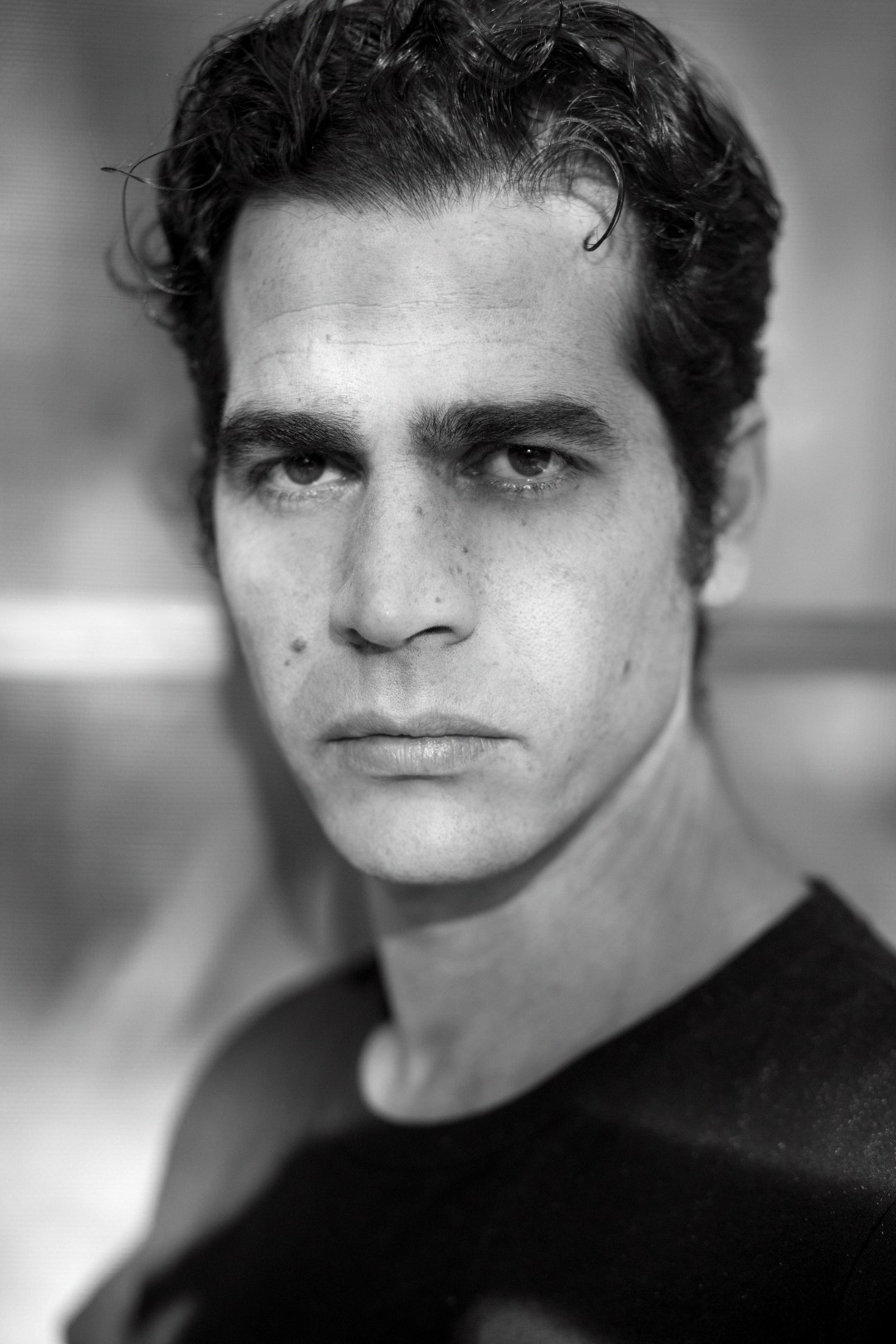
- Geffen in 2017

Background information
- Born: Aviv Geffen; 10 May 1973 (age 53); Ramat Gan, Israel
- Genres: Alternative rock; post-punk; glam rock; pop rock; piano rock; new prog; experimental rock
- Occupations: Musician; singer-songwriter; record producer
- Instruments: Vocals; piano; keyboards; guitar
- Years active: 1990–present
- Labels: Hed Artzi; Helicon Records
- Member of: Blackfield

Aviv Geffen (Hebrew: אביב גפן; born 10 May 1973) is an Israeli rock musician, singer-songwriter, music producer and author. In addition to his solo career, Geffen performs with his band HaTauyot (the "Mistakes"). He is the co-founding member of the band Blackfield along with Steven Wilson. He was also the global music director for WeWork.

Geffen was popular among Israeli youth who were known during the 1990s as the "Moonlight Children" (ילדי אור הירח). Politically, he associates with the Israeli left. His music deals with subjects such as love, peace, death, suicide, politics, and the army. He was discharged from the army for medical reasons.

== Childhood ==
Aviv Geffen was born in Ramat Gan and raised in Beit Yitzhak. He is the son of the author and poet Yehonatan Geffen and actress Nurit Gefen. His sister is actress Shira Geffen. He was named after his late grandmother, Aviva Geffen.

Geffen's first public performance was in 1984, in the Israeli youth program "Shminiyot Ba'Avir" ["somersaults"] on the Israeli Channel 1, in which he sang the song "You're Only 40 Years Old" for which his sister wrote the lyrics and he composed the melody. In 1987 Geffen participated in the amateur film "Hamitpaḥat" "The Handkerchief", for which he wrote and sang the song Ima "Mom".

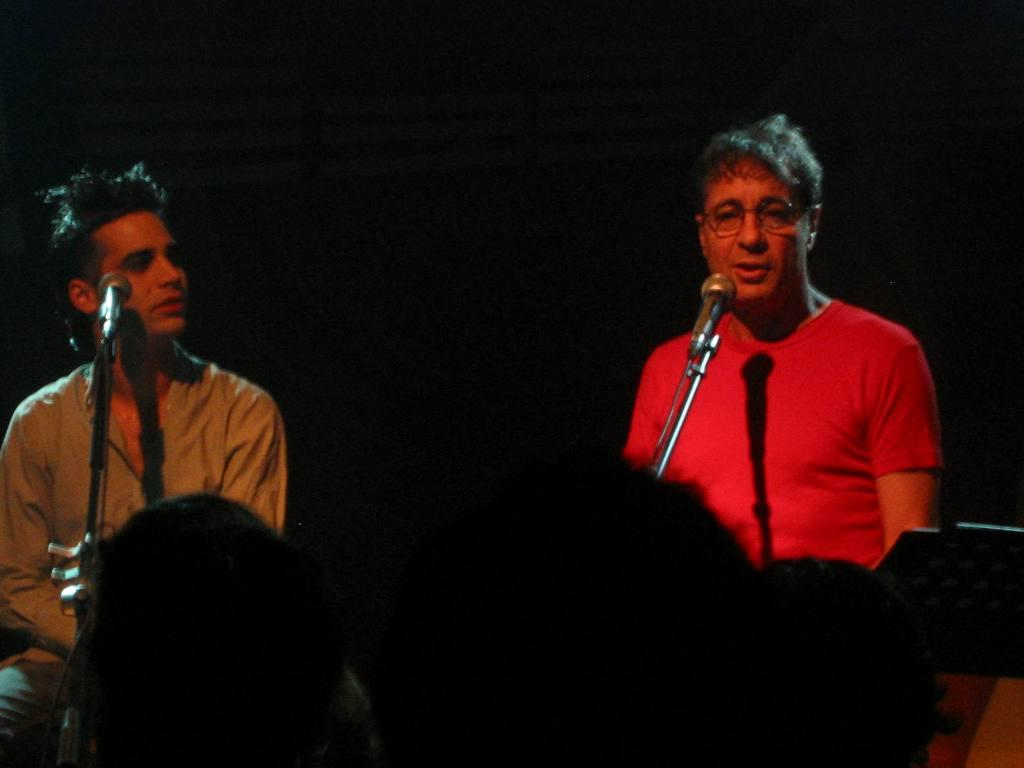
Geffen performing with his father Yehonatan Geffen (2005)

Although a great-nephew (via his grandmother Aviva) of the Israeli General and former Defense Minister, Moshe Dayan, Geffen refused enlistment in the mandatory Israeli military service, claiming conscientious objector status. He had previously advocated that Israeli youth should likewise refuse military service and criticized Israel for being "a paranoid country where people think they always have to be strong."

== Career ==
=== 1990s ===
In 1990, Geffen recorded his first song, "Friend" ["chaver"], together with the band "Cats in the Piping". In 1992, he released his first album, "Ze Rak Or Hayareach" [It's Only the Moonlight], all of whose tracks were written and the music composed by Geffen himself. The album sold only 200 copies that year, but would later become one of the most influential rock albums in Israeli music, due to the music and the lyrics of the songs.

Also in 1992, he played a part in the teenage television series A Matter of Time. That year, he also wrote a song for the Israeli movie The Beach Boys. Geffen performed in clubs with his band HaTauyót ["The Mistakes"] (the Hebrew name is purposefully misspelled in two places).

In 1993, Geffen released his second album, Achshav Me'unan [It's Cloudy Now], which went gold in the same year and expressed his generation's dissatisfaction with the Israeli government. It was produced by Moshe Levi and Ofer Meiri, who created the typical Geffen sound. The title track "It's Cloudy Now" was followed by the question that many Israeli teenagers asked with Geffen – "Do you want change?"

In 1994, Geffen released his third album, Aviv Geffen III, a concept album about negative effects on someone who was forced to join the army, the album did not mark a change in Geffen's sound. The production was handled by Geffen and Lior Tevet. The album featured the major hit "Ha'im Lehiot Bach Mehohav?" ["Should I Be In Love With You?"], which was promoted by a video and followed the success of Achshav Me'unan.

In his next album, Shumakom [Nowhere], Geffen took charge of the production, albeit with help from Reuven Shapira (as sound engineer), and producer Moshe Levi. Geffen again wrote all the lyrics and music.

As a political activist, Geffen also expressed the hope for peace with Israel's neighbors.

On 4 November 1995, the Israeli peace political parties organized a rally to support the peace process. Geffen was invited to perform, and surprisingly decided to perform Livkot Lekha ["Cry for You"], which he wrote and gave to Israeli singer Arik Einstein. Only later was it discovered that the lyrics prophesied the tragic assassination of Prime Minister Yitzhak Rabin later that night. "Cry for You" became a kind of anthem, and was the song that symbolized the Candle Children who mourned Rabin's death visually with memorial candles.

In 1996, Geffen released HaMikhtav [The Letter]. Mèred HaDmaót [The Tears Rebellion] was written after Rabin's murder in 1995. It expressed a change and a turning point in Geffen's music. Later, in 1996, Geffen recorded what was known later as "The Israeli version of 'Imagine'", "Shir Tikvá" ["Let's Walk for the Dream"], which expressed deeply Geffen's vision.

In 1997, Geffen released his first compilation, which included a CD with the best songs of the early era, and a second CD which included B sides and live performances. An attempt to widen his audience on a global level saw one of Geffen's more unusual albums, Halulìm [Hollowed]. Like his "big brothers", it was also produced by Moshe Levi, but unlike them, it is a hard, cold, and alienated, full of distortion. Despite heavy promotion (such as billboards), it failed commercially.

1999 saw the release of Geffen's 8th studio album – Leilót Levanìm [White Nights], created under the influence of the changes in Geffen's life. Moshe Levi was again the producer; the combination of the two created a soft and melodic album compared to Halulim. It contained the song "Mexico" which stayed on the Israeli charts for a long time.

=== 2000s ===
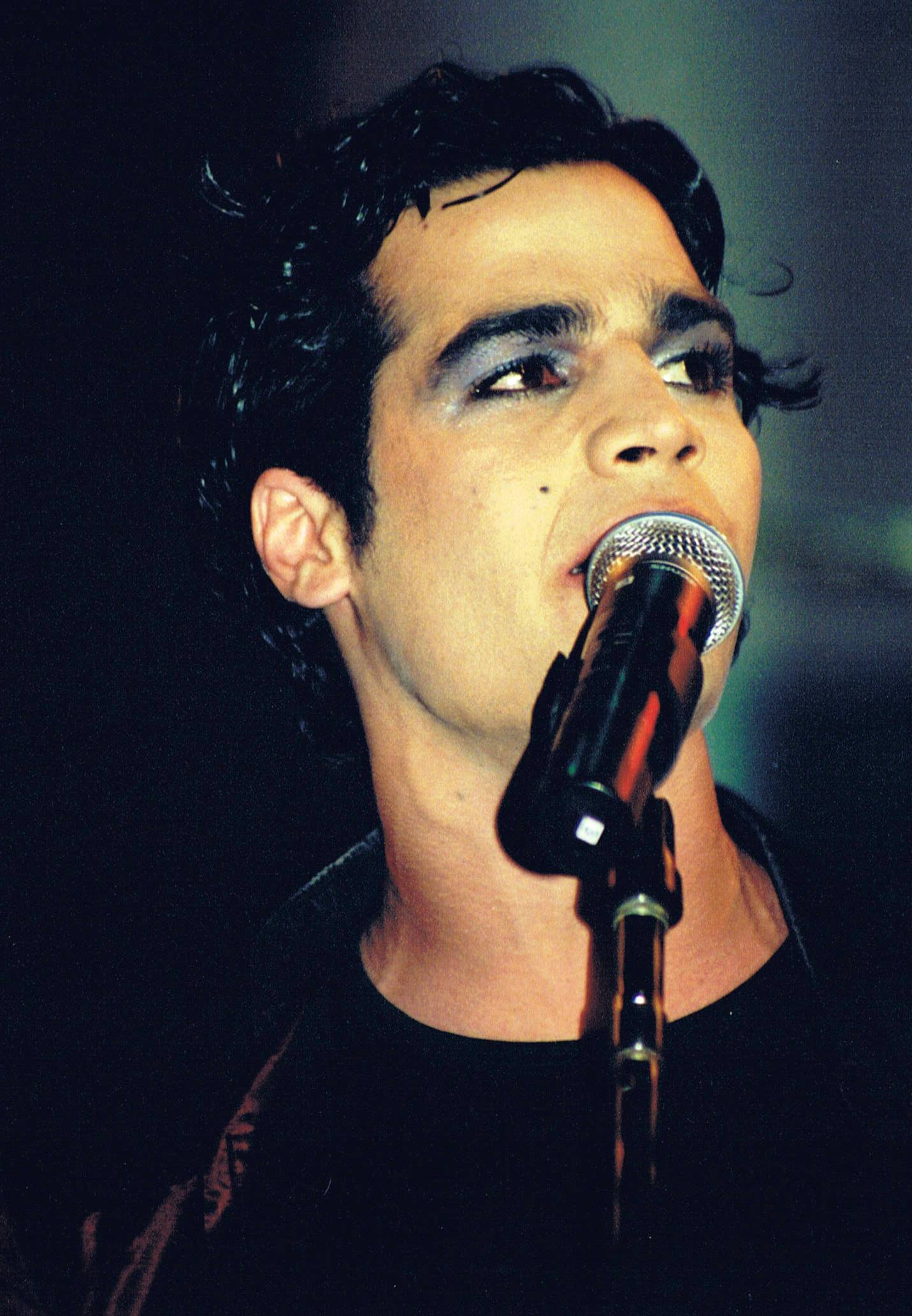
Aviv Geffen

In September 2000, Geffen released his 9th album, Yomán Masá [A Journey's Log], for the first time produced by Louie Lahav, and on a new label – "Helicon". Geffen collaborated with two notable colleagues – Daniel Salomon (who joined from the Leilot Levanim tour) and Moshe Levi, who was involved in the orchestration. Geffen had recorded 11 melodic songs, with a bonus track – a tribute to Bob Dylan – an Israeli cover of Geshem Kaved Omed Lipol ["A Hard Rain's Gonna Fall"] (translated by his father). The album produced three notable hits for Geffen: Uri Ur ["Wake Up"], Tsalakót ["Scars"], and Yoman Masa (together with Arik Einstein).

In 2001 Geffen met and began to collaborate with British rock star Steven Wilson, with whom he created the band Blackfield. Blackfield combines the musical efforts of both musicians and they perform their own original compositions as well as Aviv's own songs translated into English. The band released three highly acclaimed albums in the mid-2000s (see ahead) and conducted major tours for each release. Their fourth release in 2013 saw Wilson take more of a back seat due to his own increasing workload, opting to produce the album and contribute minor writing and recording work only.

Two years after "A Journey's Log" (April 2002), Geffen released his next album: "Memento Mori", which he dedicated to his grandmother, who died a short time before the album's release. The name was taken from the Latin phrase, "Remember You Will Die" (meaning one should remember one's mortality). Like his previous albums, "Memento Mori" was soft (but still features harder compositions). The album featured two major hits: Keren Or ["Ray of Light"] and Holèch Kadima ["Moving Forward"]. From this album came the single Shir Atzuv ["Sad Song"].

In 2003 the Israeli documentary film "Aviv" was released which focused on Aviv Geffen's life. The film premiered at the Bangkok International Film Festival.

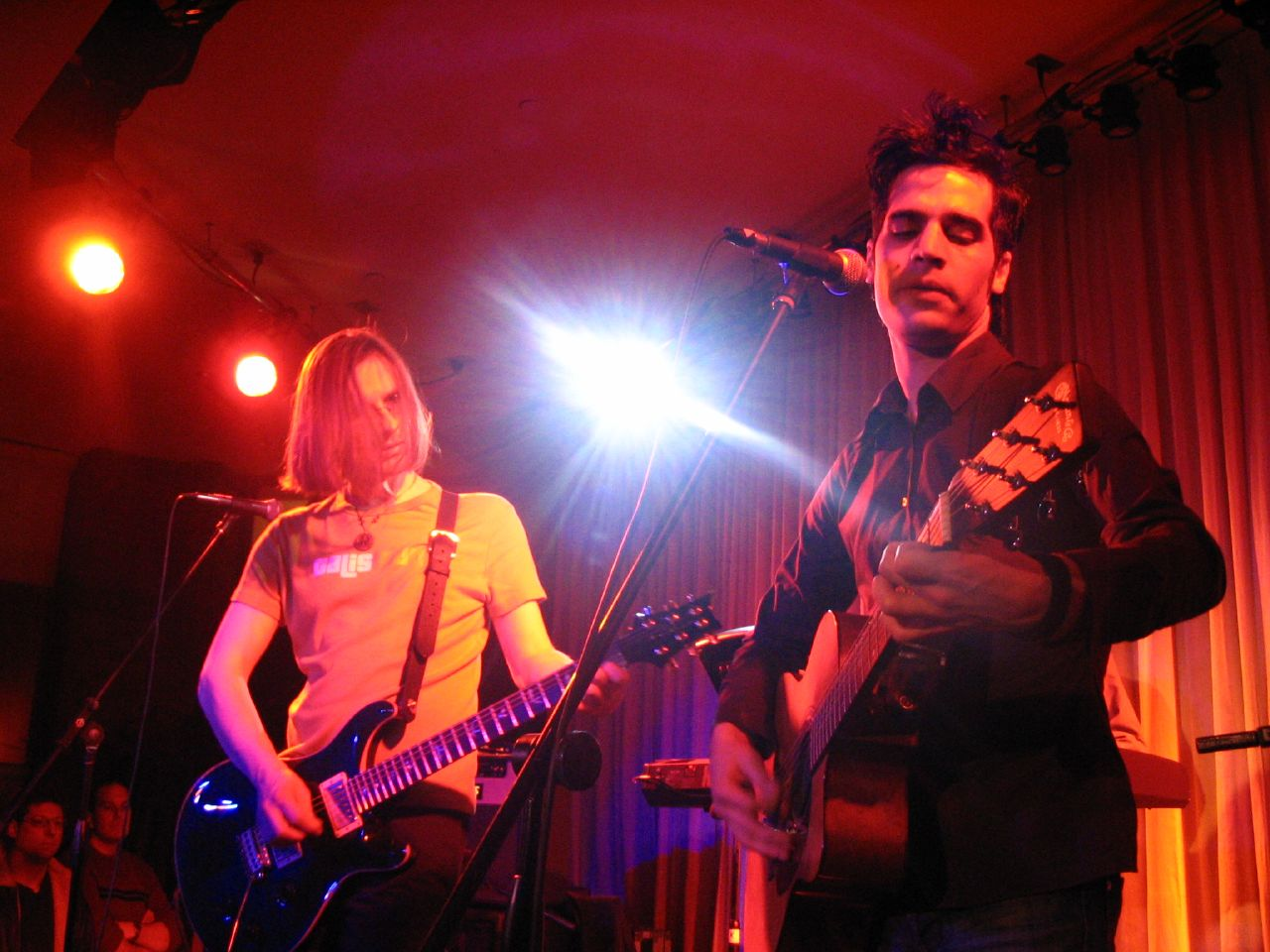
Blackfield in concert, Geffen on right (2005)

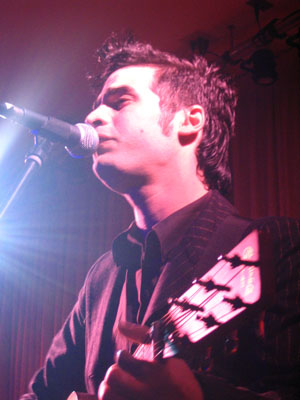
Aviv Geffen, 2005

In 2004 the album "Blackfield" was released which was a result of the collaboration between Geffen and Steven Wilson of Porcupine Tree. Its followup Blackfield II was released in early 2007, followed by the live DVD Blackfield: Live in NYC later in the year. Both of the Blackfield albums spawned several hits, notably "Blackfield", "Pain" and "Once". A third album, entitled Welcome to my DNA was released in March 2011, in which most songs were written by Geffen. It also contains a renewed version of the track "Zigota"" (זיגוטה) from his album Memento Mori.

In 2006 Geffen's 11th album Im HaZmán ["With Time"] was released. The theme song is a cover of a French chanson by Léo Ferré, which indicated matureness and sobering from the clichés that he symbolized in his initial years. Most recently he compiled a 2CD/1DVD live album, simply titled Live. Lately, Geffen declared himself radical left.

After releasing two albums with Blackfield, Geffen announced in November 2007 that he was recording his first English-language studio album. In January 2008 his single 'End of the World' charted at number one in Poland and he performed at Bush Hall in London on the 31st. He released a single (Silence) at the end of 2008 and is touring throughout January 2009, with dates in Kraków, Berlin, Hamburg, Cologne, Amsterdam, Munich, Paris and London.

In June, he announced that recording had begun at Sarm West Studios, with Trevor Horn producing and Steven Wilson and Mike Garson featuring on the album. These sessions led to his debut English-language album, Aviv Geffen, released towards the end of summer 2009. The debut single released was 'It was Meant to be a Love Song'.

=== 2010s ===
In March 2011, Blackfield's third studio album was released called Welcome to my DNA. 2013 saw the release of "Blackfield IV" with contributions of several guest vocalists.

Beginning in 2012, Aviv Geffen served as one of the four coaches on the Israeli version of the vocal performance competition show The Voice Israel.

Geffen spent most of 2015 recording the upcoming fourth Blackfield record, still with involvement of Steve Wilson who obviously took over some guitar and vocal duties, although he had announced in 2014 that he had to stop from being part of Blackfield due to lack of time. The new album was recorded in London and Los Angeles, produced by the legendary Alan Parsons. According to Geffen's Twitter account the album (or just parts of the album) was finally mixed. The record, named Blackfield V, is released on 10 February 2017.

Aviv Geffen's solo EP Mr Down & Mrs High was released in the UK on 23 May 2012. Part produced by Tony Visconti and Trevor Horn, the EP features four tracks, includes the lead song Mr Down & Mrs High, with 'Jerusalem', "Highway' and 'When Summer Comes'.

In 2018 he was appointed as the global music director for WeWork.

=== 2020s ===
In August 2022, Geffen apologized for his past anti-settler views during a concert at a settlement in the West Bank. Geffen said he had undergone a process of personal transformation that had “opened my eyes”, and that he had previously been “ignorant”. Geffen previously believed that "the Israeli settlements in Palestinian autonomous areas are like a cancer in the body of Israel", and that "We don’t need these areas and should give East Jerusalem to the Palestinians."

== Personal life ==
In 1996 Geffen married Israeli actress Ilana Berkowitz. The couple divorced in 1998. In 2005 Geffen married Shani Friedan after a seven-year relationship. The couple's first son, Dylan (named after Bob Dylan), was born in 2007. The couple's second son, Elliott (named after the character of Elliott Taylor from the film E.T. the Extra-Terrestrial), was born in 2016. This marriage also ended in a divorce. In 2024, he married Sharon Kauffman after a one-year relationship, in a Jewish ceremony in Hamburg. Geffen's third child, John (named after John Lennon and as a shortened English variant of his father's name, Yehonatan), was born in 2025. Geffen's fourth child, a girl named Moon, was born in April 2026.

Geffen is an atheist even though he got close to Judaism during COVID-19

== Musical influences ==
Over the years, Geffen's musical style has been influenced by rock bands like Pink Floyd, U2, Radiohead, Nirvana, and artists like John Lennon and Bob Dylan. Geffen's piano and guitar playing is mainly influenced by Radiohead's Thom Yorke and U2's The Edge. Geffen has often cited Bob Dylan and Roger Waters as major influences.

== Discography ==
=== Solo ===
==== Studio albums ====
- 1992 – Ze Rak Or HaYareach ("It's Only the Moonlight")
- 1993 – Ahshav Meunan ("It's Cloudy Now")
- 1994 – Aviv Geffen III
- 1995 – Shumakom ("Nowhere")
- 1996 – HaMihtav ("The Letter")
- 1998 – Halulim ("Hollowed")
- 1999 – Leyloth Levanim ("White Nights")
- 2000 – Yoman Massah ("A Journey's Log")
- 2002 – Memento Mori
- 2006 – Im Hazman ("As Time Goes By")
- 2009 – Aviv Geffen – First English-language album
- 2012 – Psefas ("Mosaic")
- 2014 – Sdakim ("Cracks")
- 2025 – Historya Shel Teunot ("History of Accidents")

==== Live album ====
- 2008 – Live – 2CD and DVD box set

==== Compilation albums ====
- 1997 – Yareach Malé ("Full Moon") – 2CD
- 2007 – Rak Shirey Ahava ("Only Love Songs") – Love song collection sold exclusively at the Aroma Espresso Bar chain

==== Soundtrack album ====
- 2022 – Shnot HaYareach ("The Moon Years")

==== EP ====
- 2011 – Mr. Down & Mrs. High

==== Box set ====
- 2016 – × 2

=== Non-album singles ===
- 1991 – "Haver" ("Friend")
- 1992 – "Ne'arey HaHof" ("The Beach Boys")
- 1995 – "Aba Tarnegol" ("Father Rooster")
- 1999 – "Rock and Roll"
- 2003 – "Poshim Hafim MePesha" with DAM ("Innocent Criminals")
- 2009 – "Or Katan BaLev" ("A Little Light in the Heart")
- 2012 – "Miklat Shel Sheket" ("A Shelter of Silence")
- 2012 – "Yesh Shamaim MeAlay" with Eviatar Banai ("There is a Sky Above Me")
- 2015 – "Katzir Milhama" ("War Harvest")
- 2016 – "Zman Tas" ("Time Flies")
- 2017 – "Mi Ani Hayom?" ("Who Am I Today?")
- 2017 – "Ba Elay" with Orit Shahaf ("Came to Me")
- 2017 – "Ad SheYa'ale HaOr" ("Until the Light Comes On")
- 2017 – "Hallelujah"
- 2017 – "Nadneda" ("swings")
- 2018 – "Tzlil Meytar" ("String Sound")
- 2018 – "At Lo Levad" with Mikiyagi and Dudi Levi ("You are Not Alone")
- 2019 – "VeSalahti Lach" ("And I Forgave You")
- 2020 – "Batzoret" with Avraham Fried ("Drought")
- 2021 – "Le'an Elech?" with the cast of Shababnikim ("Where Will I Go?")
- 2022 – "Varod Mavrik" with Ella-Lee Lahav ("Bright Pink")
- 2022 – "Me Nishar Li Mimha?" with Anna Zak ("What Do I Have Left of You?")
- 2023 – "Mekia Et HaYofi" ("Vomiting the Beauty")
- 2023 – "Osher BeKapiyot" ("Happiness in Spoons")
- 2023 – "Ihiye Tov" with the cast of Eretz Nehederet ("Will Be Good")
- 2023 – "Ahake" ("I Will Wait")
- 2023 – "Zriha Shhora" with Mia Leimberg ("Black Sunrise")
- 2024 – "Gavoa" with Tamar Amar ("High")

=== with Blackfield ===
- 2004 – Blackfield
- 2007 – Blackfield II
- 2007 – NYC – Blackfield Live in New York City – CD and DVD set and separate DVD
- 2011 – Welcome to My DNA
- 2013 – Blackfield IV
- 2017 – Blackfield V
- 2020 – For the Music

=== Work for other artists ===
- 1993 – Keren Hachth, Keren Hachth
- 1999 – Rockfour, Rockfour Live
- 2001 – Porcupine Tree, In Absentia
- 2002 – Daniel Salomon, Daniel Salomon, (also producer)
- 2003 – Shachar Even-Tzur, Eyrumim ("Naked"), (also producer)
- 2005 – Daniel Salomon, Rabot HaDrachim, ("There's Many Ways")
- 2006 – Ninet Tayeb, Barefoot, (also producer)

== See also ==
- Aviv – a 2003 documentary about Aviv Geffen
- List of peace activists
