= Blackfield (album) =

Studio album by Blackfield
- Released: January 2004
- Recorded: 2001–2003
- Genre: Art rock
- Length: 37:57
- Label: Helicon, Snapper Music, Kscope
- Producer: Steven Wilson and Aviv Geffen

Blackfield chronology
Blackfield (2004)	Blackfield II (2007)

Singles from Blackfield
- 1. "Hello" Released: 2001; 2. "Pain" Released: 2003; 3. "Blackfield" Released: 2004; 4. "Cloudy Now" Released: May 2004

Professional ratings
Review scores
Source	Rating
Allmusic	3.5/5 stars
PopMatters	7/10 stars

Blackfield is the debut album by the art rock band Blackfield, released on the Snapper Music/Helicon labels in February 2004. The album was re-released in August of the same year with an additional three-track bonus disc, followed by a later pressing that contains the album and the three bonus tracks all on one CD.

Two songs are covers in English of earlier Aviv Geffen songs in Hebrew, "Cloudy Now" (עכשיו מעונן) from 1993 and "Scars" (צלקות) from 2000. In the latter case, Aviv's original studio recording was simply reused with newly sung vocals.

Four singles were released from the album: "Hello", "Pain", "Blackfield" and "Cloudy Now".

== Track listing ==
No.	Title	Lyrics	Music	Length
1.	"Open Mind"	Steven Wilson	Aviv Geffen	3:51
2.	"Blackfield"	Wilson	Wilson	4:06
3.	"Glow"	Geffen/Wilson	Geffen	4:00
4.	"Scars"	Geffen/Wilson	Geffen	4:00
5.	"Lullaby"	Wilson	Wilson	3:33
6.	"Pain"	Geffen	Geffen	3:49
7.	"Summer"	Geffen/Wilson	Geffen	4:12
8.	"Cloudy Now"	Geffen/Wilson	Geffen	3:34
9.	"The Hole in Me"	Geffen	Geffen	2:47
10.	"Hello"	Geffen/Wilson	Geffen	3:09
Total length:				36:52

=== Bonus disc ===
No.	Title	Lyrics	Music	Length
1.	"Perfect World"	Geffen, Wilson	Geffen	3:53
2.	"Where Is My Love?"	Geffen	Geffen	3:03
3.	"Cloudy Now (Live)"	Geffen, Wilson	Geffen	3:43
Total length:				10:38

There is also a 2-LP version with "Perfect World" and another, LP-exclusive track, "Feel So Low"; the latter is a cover of a Porcupine Tree song from Lightbulb Sun with the first verse sung in Hebrew.

Steven Wilson's SoundCloud page features an extended version of the title-track as a streamable and downloadable WAV file. This version has an extra minute and a half at the end, where the outro groove turns into acoustic guitar strumming and a new vocal line before the song fades out.

== Personnel ==
Blackfield

- Aviv Geffen - keyboards, additional guitars, vocals
- Steven Wilson - guitars, additional keyboards, vocals
- Daniel Salomon - piano; keyboards and backing vocals on "Cloudy Now (live)"
- Seffy Efrati - bass guitar
- Chris Maitland - drums, percussion on "Blackfield", "The Hole in Me", "Hello" and "Cloudy Now (live)", backing vocals on "Cloudy Now (live)"

Guest musicians

- Gavin Harrison - drums, percussion on "Open Mind", "Pain" and "Perfect World"
- Yirmi Kaplan - drums, percussion on "Glow" and "Summer"
- The Mistakes - instruments on "Scars"
- Strings on "Open Mind", "Lullaby", "Summer" and "Hello" performed by the Illusion quartet conducted by Daniel Salomon.

Production

- Steven Wilson – producer, mixer
- Aviv Geffen - producer
- Shlomy Kane'an, Barack Gabison, Eyal Dafna - technical assistance
- Chris Blair – mastering
- Lasse Hoile – photography
- Carl Glover – graphic design
