= Blackfield =

International rock duo

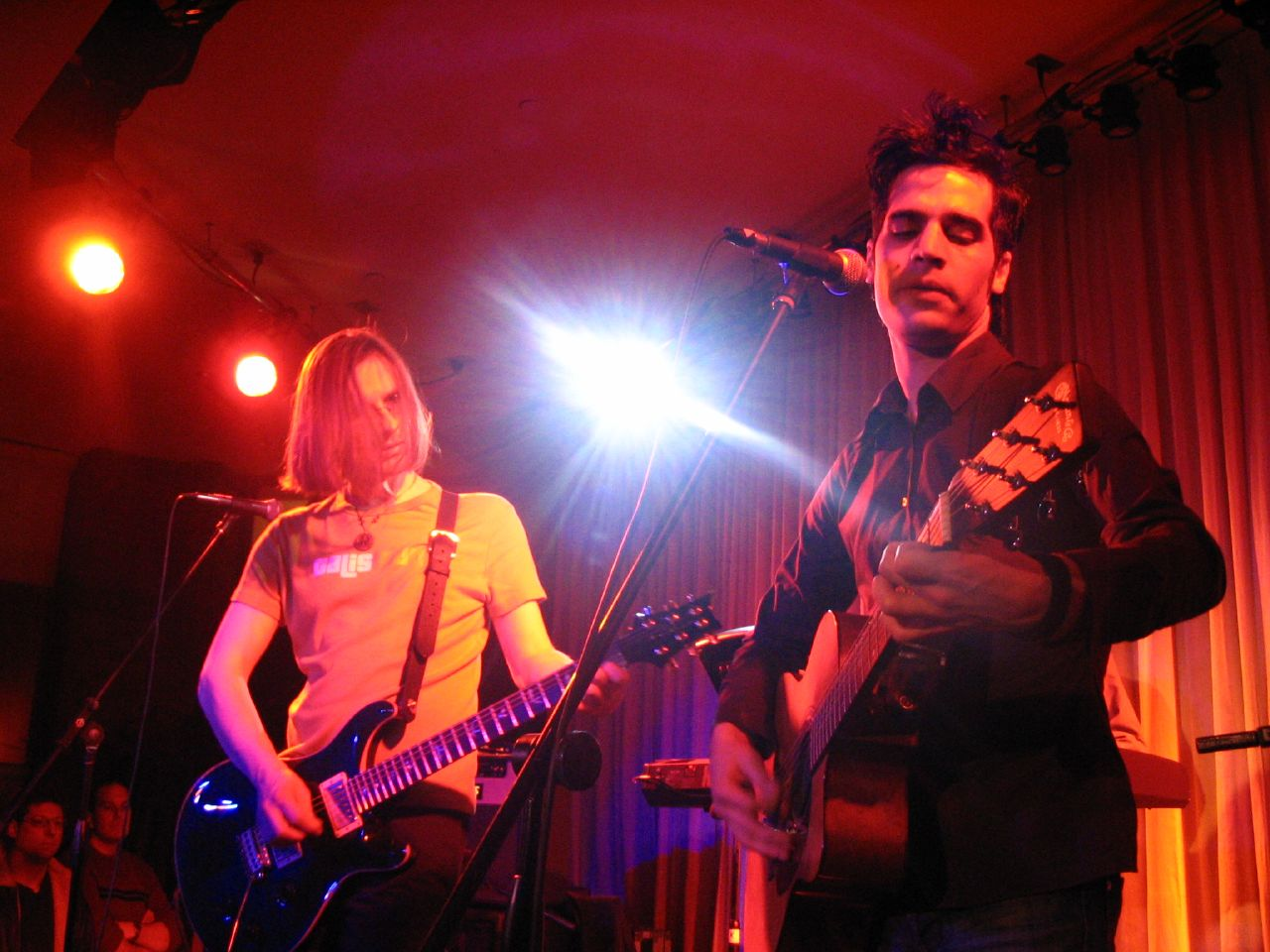
- Blackfield performing in 2005

Background information
- Origin: Hemel Hempstead, England; Ramat Gan, Israel
- Genres: Art rock; pop rock; alternative rock; progressive rock
- Years active: 2001–present
- Labels: Atlantic; Snapper Music
- Members: Aviv Geffen; Steven Wilson; Tomer Z Eran Mitelman; Omri Agmon; Hadar Green
- Past members: Chris Maitland; Daniel Salomon; Seffy Efrati

Blackfield is a collaborative music project by the English musician and founder of Porcupine Tree, Steven Wilson, and Israeli rock musician Aviv Geffen. Together, six albums have been released under the moniker. The first two records, Blackfield and Blackfield II, saw Geffen and Wilson working together as equal partners, while the third and fourth, Welcome to my DNA and Blackfield IV, saw Geffen take on a leading role, writing all but one track across both albums and providing a significantly increased share of lead vocals. Despite initially announcing his intention to leave the project in 2014, Wilson instead worked again as an equal partner on a fifth album, Blackfield V, which was released on 10 February 2017. A sixth record, For the Music, was released on 4 December 2020, with Geffen again taking a leading role.

== History ==
=== First collaborative era ===
==== Blackfield I (2000–2005) ====
Geffen, a fan of Porcupine Tree and Wilson, invited the band to play shows in Israel in 2000. He struck up a friendship with Wilson, leading to the two musicians recording together. Geffen performed backing vocals on two tracks on Porcupine Tree's In Absentia album, "The Sound of Muzak" and "Prodigal". Geffen, interested in growing a fanbase outside of Israel, approached Wilson about starting their own project, which would become Blackfield. Originally planned as an EP for a 2001 release, it eventually evolved into a 2004 self-titled full-length recording. Wilson provided lead vocals on all but two songs, and played guitar or piano on every song except "Scars", which had instrumentation provided by Geffen's band "The Mistakes.”

Outside of Israel, the band has received constant comparison to Porcupine Tree, Wilson's most popular project. In response, Wilson has explained:

...Porcupine Tree would never be so focused on the art of a 3 minute pop song, which I believe. Blackfield is all about the art of a great tradition pop song of verse-chorus-verse-chorus. Porcupine Tree has never been about that, although we have fraternized a little bit with the art of pop music. Porcupine Tree has always been more about horizontally complex long pieces and the album is an overall piece rather than lots of little pieces... Aviv is not a big fan of heavy music and he is not a big fan of long pieces so immediately the meeting point had to be somewhere where we were both focused on short melancholic songs.

In early 2004, the band debuted live on a couple of promotional TV performances in Israel. This line-up featured drummer Chris Maitland (drummer of Porcupine Tree from 1993 to 2002), who was replaced by Tomer Zidkyahu for a European tour that followed in the autumn of 2004. Their first self-titled album was released in Israel and Europe in 2004, and the United States in 2005.

==== Blackfield II (2006–2008) ====
While the band's first album was created over a relatively long period of time, the follow-up album, Blackfield II, was created in one short burst of activity. Wilson and Geffen worked on their respective projects throughout the end of 2005, but in early 2006 Wilson moved to Israel for six months to work on the album. Wilson performed lead or co-vocals on all tracks except "Miss U", which Geffen performed all vocals on. The album was released in February 2007 in Europe and March 2007 in the United States. In the same year, keyboardist Daniel Salomon left the band to continue his successful solo career. Salomon was replaced by Eran Mitelman, former keyboardist for Israeli hard rock band HaYehudim. The band also recorded a live CD/DVD combo, titled Blackfield – Live in New York City while touring in support of Blackfield II, in March 2007.

In a 2008 interview, Wilson discussed Blackfield's future at the time, stating, "I think we're going to tentatively start working on some new songs and that's as far as we've got regarding planning. I think there almost certainly will be another record. As with No-Man and my other projects, there's no reason to stop doing them as long as the music keeps flowing."

=== Geffen-led era ===
==== Welcome to my DNA (2009–2011) ====
In January 2009, to promote his first English-language European release, Geffen went on a small tour of Europe with the Blackfield live band, with Wilson being billed as a special guest. Half of the set consisted of songs from the then yet-to-be-released first English language solo album by Geffen, while the rest was a selection of Blackfield songs. Wilson would also appear on three tracks from the album.

In April 2010, Geffen and Wilson entered the studio to begin writing the follow-up to Blackfield II. However, this time, all songs, with the exception of the track "Waving", were written by Geffen, as Wilson had been concentrating on his second solo album, Grace for Drowning, at the same time. Wilson only performed lead vocals on five of the eleven tracks, but provided backing or co-vocals on several other tracks. Their third album, Welcome to my DNA, was released on 28 March 2011 and supported by a European and North American tour following a kickoff concert in Israel. However, several concert dates were cancelled due to the death of Wilson's father in May 2011.

==== Blackfield IV (2012–2014) ====
After touring for Welcome to my DNA was completed, Wilson confirmed that with Blackfield, like the majority of his other projects, he himself had no particular plans for the future, but the project was not necessarily over either. However, in January 2012, Geffen announced his intentions to release a fourth Blackfield album by May 2012. This prompted Wilson to announce that his role would continue to lessen, with Wilson acting only as a contributor and mixer. Wilson said of the band's future:

...just to clarify news elsewhere of a new Blackfield album coming this year – please note that this time my involvement will be as a contributor rather than a member. I will still be mixing the album, and maybe sing on a couple of Aviv’s songs (there will be other guest singers I understand), but with my complete blessing Blackfield is now under his sole curatorship, a process which really began with Welcome to My DNA"

Wilson later said that it was his own idea for Geffen to take over the project, because he wanted to concentrate on his solo career and Porcupine Tree in 2012 and 2013, while Geffen wanted to do another Blackfield album right away in 2012, and he felt guilty about holding him back.

On 29 and 30 January, both Geffen and Wilson were in the studio working on vocals and guitar for the then-untitled fourth album. Wilson stated that he would contribute lead vocals to only one song, but was also contributing "a bunch of guitar parts" and "arranging backing vocals". Despite his lessened role, he said that he was "protective of the Blackfield legacy", and that the next album would "still sound like a quintessential Blackfield album." One of the guest vocalists that Wilson had mentioned before was Vincent Cavanagh of the band Anathema. On 14 June 2012, Geffen announced he was in the final mixing stages of the album with Wilson. In a September 2012 interview with Discord Magazine, Wilson reiterated his stance with Blackfield, stating:

I won’t say producing [the fourth album], I am only helping [Geffen], a bit of singing, guitar, mixing whatever it takes but I am not going to tour, it'll be too much, I'll kill myself, would just run myself to the ground. I won't tour Blackfield anymore but I will do anything to keep the name going...I just don't think that writing the kind of style that Blackfield make is where I am at right now.

At the end of November 2012, Geffen said he was aiming for an April 2013 release. Wilson reiterated that he sang and played guitar on several tracks, but "much less than before", that Geffen was able to get "a bunch of great singers to contribute to the record, some of whom are quite well known", and that the album would be the first that Geffen would consent to be mixed for surround sound.

On 25 February 2013, Wilson released his third solo album, The Raven That Refused to Sing, of which some copies contained a compilation sampler disc of music made by artists on the record label Kscope; one track was a new Blackfield song, "Pills", taken from the forthcoming album. On 9 June 2013, it was announced that the album would be titled Blackfield IV, and its release date would be 26 August 2013. Blackfield toured in support of the album in February 2014, with Wilson being present for all performances. On 29 January 2014, Wilson announced his intention to quit the band after the European tour, due to his increasingly tight schedule with his solo career and upcoming projects.

=== Second collaborative era ===
==== Blackfield V (2015–2018) ====
In January 2015, it was announced that Geffen and Alan Parsons were recording and performing together for a future Blackfield album. Despite Wilson's comments alluding to leaving the band in 2014, he was seen in recording sessions with Geffen and Parsons in June 2015 and June 2016. In August 2016, album details were officially announced, revealing the official album title – Blackfield V, its artwork, and that it would see a return to the collaborative approach between Wilson and Geffen taken for the first two Blackfield records. The album was initially scheduled for release on 18 November 2016, but was later delayed to 10 February 2017. On 8 December 2016 "Family Man", "How Was Your Ride?" and "Sorrys", the second, third and fifth songs from the album, were released.

On 28 June 2018, Steven Wilson announced the compilation album "Open Mind - The Best of Blackfield" on his Instagram. The album was released in September 2018.

=== Warner Records era ===
==== For the Music (2019–present) ====
On 13 May 2019, a picture of Geffen and Wilson working in a recording studio was posted on the band's Facebook page with the caption "Blackfield 6th, recording session, here we go again !" In July 2020, Geffen signed to Warner Records. After announcing his signing with Warner, on 24 July Blackfield released the first single, “Summer's Gone”, from their upcoming sixth album For the Music, followed by a second track “Under My Skin” on 2 October. For the Music was released worldwide on 4 December 2020. The album saw Geffen once again taking a leading role, with Wilson only providing lead vocals on three tracks.

== Musical style and influences ==
Geffen has described the band's sounds as

"I don't think it's prog really, it's...very melodic...but it's not prog. I don't allow Steven to play more than two-minute solos. He respects that. Blackfield is everything, it's metal, it's prog, it's pop. Blackfield sounds so special because it's a really odd collaboration. I'm not coming from the prog scene, I'm coming from the indie rock, pop scene."

Geffen states that while he enjoys mixing different musical sounds, he refuses to incorporate rap music into the band's sound, stating "I hate hip hop...We won't do a shitty pop song." Influences for the band include Jim Morrison, Radiohead, King Crimson, Genesis, and Pink Floyd.

=== Cross-overs ===
There has been some overlap between Blackfield and Geffen and Wilson's other projects. The songs "Scars," "Cloudy Now," "Glow," "1,000 People," "Epidemic," "End of the World," "Zigota" and "Garden of Sin" had originally been written by Geffen in Hebrew before being translated into English and adapted by Blackfield. On the other hand, the song "Christenings" was originally conceived during Wilson's writing sessions for Porcupine Tree's 2005 release Deadwing, but was released on Blackfield II instead. Additionally, the track "Feel So Low", off of Porcupine Tree's 2000 release Lightbulb Sun, was re-recorded by Blackfield and added to the LP version of Blackfield's first album. In this version, Geffen sings the first verse in Hebrew.

Live, Blackfield has performed Porcupine Tree's "Waiting" and "Feel So Low", as well as covering Alanis Morissette's "Thank U," which Wilson had previously recorded solo for his own cover version compilation album.

== Comments from other musicians ==
Some musicians have cited them as an influence, such as Dial, while others have expressed admiration for their work including Jordan Rudess, Arne "Lanvall" Stockhammer of Edenbridge, Nick Barrett of Pendragon, Thrawn of Secrets of the Moon, and Dean Marsh of Gandalf's Fist.

== Musicians ==
=== Current members ===
- Steven Wilson – vocals, guitar, keyboards (2001–present)
- Aviv Geffen – vocals, keyboards, guitar (2001–present)
- Omri Agmon – guitar (2017–present)
- Hadar Green – bass guitar (2017–present)
- Eran Mitelman – piano, keyboards (2007–present)
- Tomer Z – drums, percussion (2004–present)

=== Former members ===
- Chris Maitland – drums, percussion, backing vocals (2001–2004)
- Daniel Salomon – piano, keyboards, backing vocals (2004–2007)
- Seffy Efrati – bass guitar (2004–2014)

== Discography ==
=== Studio albums ===
Year	Title	Peak chart positions							
Year	Title	BEL (Fl)	BEL (Wa)	FRA	FIN	NLD	SWI	POL	UK
2004	Blackfield: Date: January 2004; Label: Helicon, Snapper	—	—	—	—	—	—	—	—
2007	Blackfield II: Date: 13 February 2007; Label: Atlantic/We Put Out	—	—	—	—	78	—	19	—
2011	Welcome to My DNA: Date: 28 March 2011; Label: Kscope	—	100	185	47	31	64	10	139
2013	Blackfield IV: Date: 26 August 2013; Label: Kscope	98	47	65	—	28	74	8	95
2017	Blackfield V: Date: 10 February 2017; Label: Kscope	115	118	155	43	16	48	16	54
2020	For the Music: Date: 4 December 2020; Label: Warner Music Group	–	–	–	–	–	–	–	–
"—" denotes a release that did not chart.

=== DVDs ===
Year	Title	Peak chart positions
Year	Title	NLD
2007	Live in New York City: Date: 6 November 2007; Label: Snapper	30

=== Singles ===
- 2003: "Hello"
- 2003: "Pain"
- 2004: "Blackfield"
- 2004: "Cloudy Now"
- 2007: "Once"
- 2007: "Miss U"
- 2007: "My Gift of Silence"
- 2011: "Waving"
- 2013: "Jupiter"
- 2014: "Sense of Insanity"
- 2020: "Summer's Gone"
- 2020: "Under My Skin"
