= Monica Sex =

Israeli alternative rock band

Monica Sex מוניקה סקס
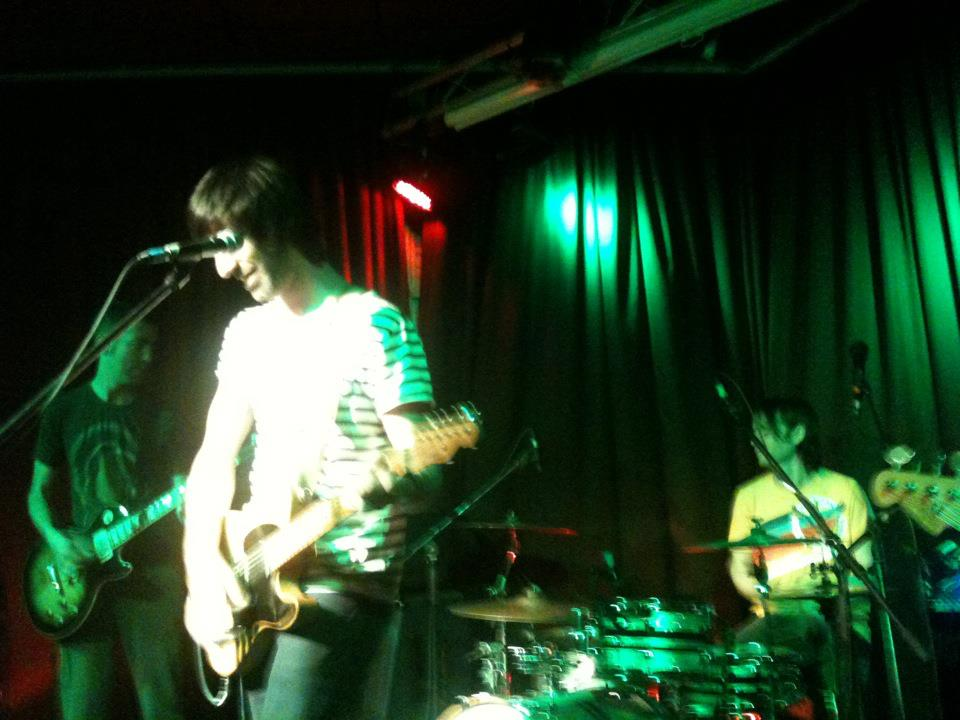
- Monica Sex, 2012

Background information
- Origin: Tel Aviv, Israel
- Genres: Rock, alternative rock, pop rock
- Years active: 1992–1996; 2000–present
- Label: Hed Artzi
- Members: Yali Sobol; Peter Roth; Shahar Even Tzur; Seffy Efrati
- Past members: Eldad Guetta; Yossi Hamami

Monica Sex (Hebrew: מוניקה סקס; also spelled Monika Sex) is an Israeli alternative rock band formed in Tel Aviv in 1992 and led by singer and songwriter Yali Sobol. Its debut album, Wounds and Kisses (1995), was certified gold. The band broke up in 1996, re-formed in 2000, and has continued to record and perform since.

== History ==
=== Formation and Wounds and Kisses (1992–1995) ===
The band was formed in late 1992 by Yali Sobol (vocals, guitar), Shahar Even Tzur (drums, vocals) and Yossi Hamami (bass); guitarist Peter Roth joined shortly afterwards. According to Sobol, the name refers to the bassist of the Haifa punk band Killer.

Sobol wrote nearly all of the band's early lyrics. After two years of performing, the band signed with Hed Artzi, and its debut album, Wounds and Kisses (Hebrew: פצעים ונשיקות, romanized: Ptza'im VeNeshikot), was released in February 1995 and went gold. Four singles from the album received significant radio airplay. Hamami left the band early on, shortly after the release of its first single.

=== United States and break-up (1995–1996) ===
After Wounds and Kisses, the band moved to New York as a trio, with Roth on bass guitar, and worked on songs in English. They returned to Israel for one show as an opening act for Sonic Youth. The band decided to break up in 1996. Sobol returned to Israel, and Roth became a session guitarist for several Israeli bands; Even Tzur stayed in the United States.

=== Reunion, Open Relations and Pets (2000–2010) ===
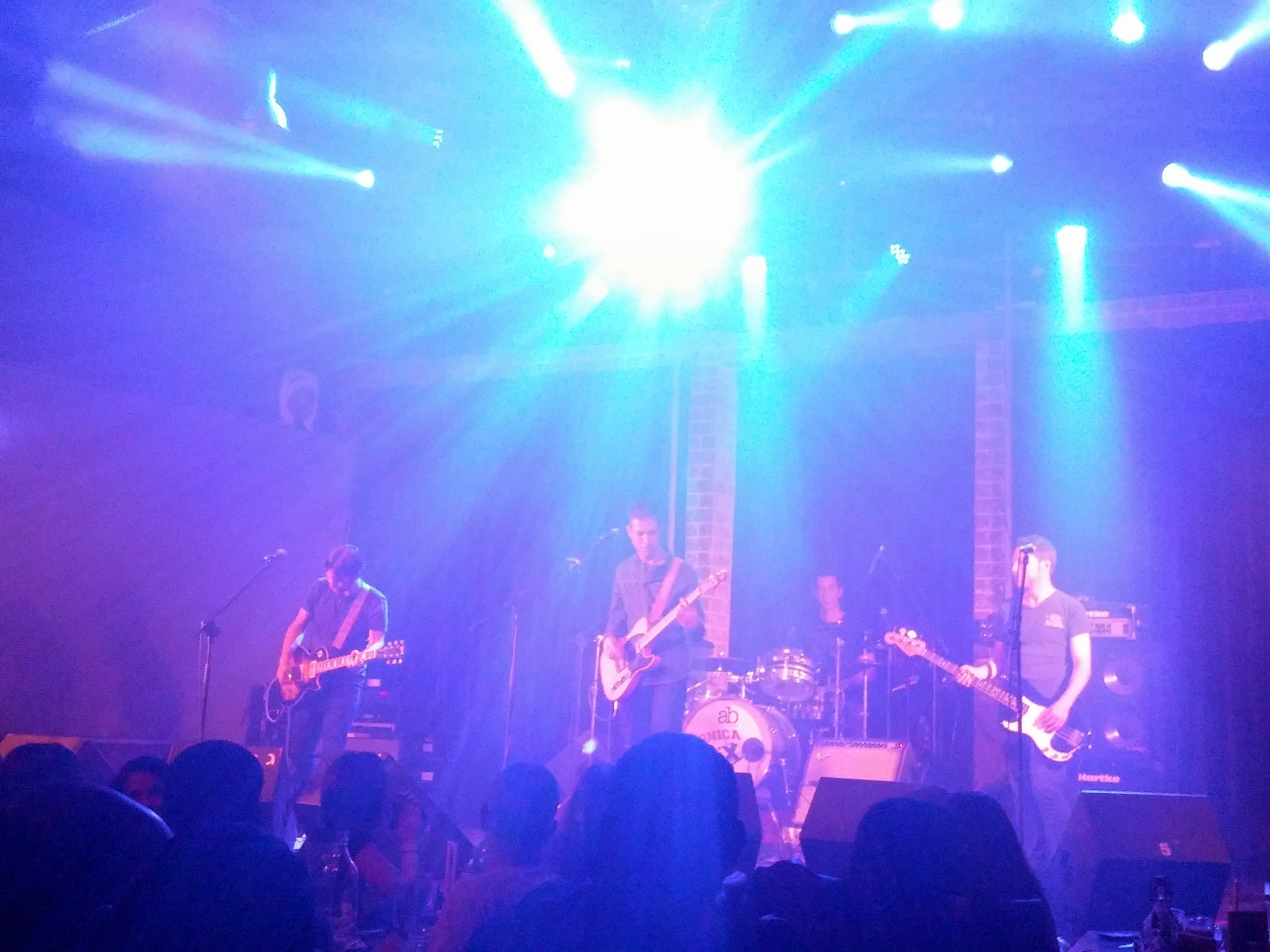
Monica Sex performing live in 2015

Monica Sex re-formed in 2000, and its second album, Open Relations (Hebrew: יחסים פתוחים, romanized: Yahasim Ptuchim), followed about a year later. Organist Eldad Guetta played on the album and later joined the band. The band has described it as its most experimental record.

The third album, Pets (Hebrew: חיות מחמד, romanized: Hayot Mahmad), produced by Izhar Ashdot, was released in 2003. Around the same time, the band backed Shalom Hanoch on his album Or Yisraeli and on the accompanying tour. The band then went on hiatus until 2010, performing only occasionally, including at the annual "Rock Atzmaut" show on Israeli Independence Day. Bassist Seffy Efrati joined in 2009.

=== Melody and later albums (2010–present) ===
In mid-2010, the band announced that it would return to the studio to record a new album. Its fourth album, Melody (Hebrew: מנגינה, romanized: Mangina), was produced by Ofer Meiri. It was preceded by the singles "The Dress from Madrid" (Hebrew: השמלה ממדריד, romanized: Ha-Simla mi-Madrid) and "Mangina", and was released on 24 February 2011 with a show at Hangar 11 in Tel Aviv.

In October 2013, the band released "Shuv Yored Or Hoki Afrouri", a setting of a poem by Meir Wieseltier and its first single with lyrics not written by a band member. It was followed in March 2014 by the band's fifth studio album, Free Professions (Hebrew: מקצועות חופשיים, romanized: Miktzo'ot Hofshiyim), produced by Eyal Even Tzur, Shahar's brother. By 2022 the band had released six albums, each with a different producer.

In January 2022, the band released the single "HaKol SheMiBifnim" (Hebrew: הקול שמבפנים, lit. 'The Voice from Inside'), produced by Even Tzur, and marked 30 years since its formation with a concert at Hangar 11 in Tel Aviv in March 2022. In July 2026, it released the single "Kishuf Negdi" (Hebrew: כישוף נגדי), written by Sobol.

== Band members ==
=== Current members ===
- Yali Sobol – vocals, guitar (1992–1996, 2000–present)
- Peter Roth – guitar, backing vocals (1993–1995, 2000–2001, 2009–present), bass (1995–1996, 2001–2009)
- Shahar Even Tzur – drums, vocals (1992–1996, 2000–present)
- Seffy Efrati – bass (2009–present)

=== Former members ===
- Eldad Guetta – keyboards, organ (1993–1995), bass (2000–2001)
- Yossi Hamami – bass, backing vocals (1992–1995)

Efrati, a left-handed bassist, has also played in Aviv Geffen's band and in the Israeli-British art rock band Blackfield, led by Geffen and Porcupine Tree's Steven Wilson. In 2008, he co-starred in the HOT3 mini-series Ta'ase Li Yeled, directed by Yuval Schafferman.

== Discography ==
=== Studio albums ===
- Wounds and Kisses (פצעים ונשיקות, 1995)
- Open Relations (יחסים פתוחים, 2001)
- Pets (חיות מחמד, 2003)
- Melody (מנגינה, 2011)
- Free Professions (מקצועות חופשיים, 2014)

== See also ==
- Music of Israel
