= Tomer Z =

Tomer Zidkyahu (Hebrew: תומר צדקיהו; known under his stage name Tomer Z) is the drummer for the band Blackfield. He joined the band in 2004 after departure of the previous drummer Chris Maitland and is currently still an active member. He also plays in the band Ephrat. He is the brother of Nir Zidkyahu.
