= Home Invasion: In Concert at the Royal Albert Hall =

2018 live album/DVD by Steven Wilson

Video / live album by Steven Wilson
- Released: 2 November 2018
- Recorded: 29 March 2018
- Venue: Royal Albert Hall, London
- Genre: Progressive rock
- Label: Eagle Vision
- Director: James Russell
- Producer: Steven Wilson

Steven Wilson chronology
To the Bone (2017)	Home Invasion: In Concert at the Royal Albert Hall (2018)	The Future Bites (2021)

Steven Wilson video chronology
Get All You Deserve (2012)	Home Invasion: In Concert at the Royal Albert Hall (2018)

Steven Wilson live albums chronology
Get All You Deserve (2012)	Home Invasion: In Concert at the Royal Albert Hall (2018)	Impossible Tightrope: Live In Madrid (2026)

Home Invasion: In Concert at the Royal Albert Hall is the second live Blu-ray/DVD and third live album by progressive rock musician Steven Wilson, released on 2 November 2018. It was filmed on the final night of Wilson's three-night residency at the Royal Albert Hall in London, which was part of the To the Bone tour. A 5-LP Vinyl edition was released on March 29, 2019 with six extra tracks not present on the CD edition.

== Track listing ==
All tracks written by Steven Wilson.

DVD/Blu-ray
No.	Title	Album	Length
1.	"'Truth' (Intro)"
2.	"Nowhere Now"	To the Bone
3.	"Pariah"	To the Bone
4.	"Home Invasion / Regret #9"	Hand. Cannot. Erase.
5.	"The Creator Has a Mastertape"	In Absentia (Porcupine Tree album)
6.	"Refuge"	To the Bone
7.	"People Who Eat Darkness"	To the Bone
8.	"Ancestral"	Hand. Cannot. Erase.
9.	"Arriving Somewhere But Not Here"	Deadwing (Porcupine Tree album)
10.	"Permanating"	To the Bone
11.	"Song of I"	To the Bone
12.	"Lazarus"	Deadwing (Porcupine Tree album)
13.	"Detonation"	To the Bone
14.	"The Same Asylum as Before"	To the Bone
15.	"Song of Unborn"	To the Bone
16.	"Vermillioncore"	4½
17.	"Sleep Together"	Fear of a Blank Planet (Porcupine Tree album)
18.	"Even Less"	Stupid Dream (Porcupine Tree album)
19.	"Blank Tapes"	To the Bone
20.	"The Sound of Muzak"	In Absentia (Porcupine Tree album)
21.	"The Raven That Refused to Sing"	The Raven That Refused to Sing (And Other Stories)

CD – Disc 1
No.	Title	Length
1.	"'Truth' (Intro)"	2:51
2.	"Nowhere Now"	4:12
3.	"Pariah"	5:07
4.	"Home Invasion / Regret #9"	11:02
5.	"The Creator Has a Mastertape"	5:32
6.	"Refuge"	8:40
7.	"People Who Eat Darkness"	6:16
8.	"Ancestral"	13:53
9.	"Arriving Somewhere But Not Here"	13:51

CD – Disc 2
No.	Title	Length
1.	"Permanating"	5:34
2.	"Song of I"	7:13
3.	"Lazarus"	4:09
4.	"Detonation"	11:21
5.	"The Same Asylum as Before"	6:00
6.	"Song of Unborn"	6:33
7.	"Vermillioncore"	5:06
8.	"Sleep Together"	8:07
9.	"Even Less"	3:58
10.	"Blank Tapes"	3:11
11.	"The Sound of Muzak"	5:08
12.	"The Raven That Refused to Sing"	8:31

Vinyl – Same as DVD/Blu-ray/CD editions, but with the addition of the following tracks
No.	Title	Album	Length
1.	"Routine"	Hand. Cannot. Erase.	9:01
2.	"Hand Cannot Erase"	Hand. Cannot. Erase.	4:18
3.	"Heartattack In A Layby"	In Absentia (Porcupine Tree album)	3:59
4.	"How Is Your Life Today?"	Lightbulb Sun (Porcupine Tree album)	3:17
5.	"Blackfield"	Blackfield (Blackfield debut album)	4:33
6.	"Postcard"	Grace for Drowning	6:55

== Personnel ==
Adapted from liner notes.

Performers

- Steven Wilson – vocals, guitar, keyboards, bass
- Ninet Tayeb – vocals
- Alex Hutchings – guitar, backing vocals
- Nick Beggs (introduced as 'Sir Nicholas Beggs') – bass guitar, stick, backing vocals, keyboards
- Craig Blundell – drums
- Adam Holzman – keyboards

Additional personnel

- James Russell – director
- Andy Derbyshire – producer
- Nick Wheeler – photographic direction
- Tim Woolcott – editor
- Steven Wilson – audio mixing
- Lasse Hoile, Jess Cope and Steven Wilson – video screen content

== Charts ==
Chart (2018–19)	Peak position
Belgian Albums (Ultratop Flanders)	85
Belgian Albums (Ultratop Wallonia)	123
Dutch Albums (Album Top 100)	35
German Albums (Offizielle Top 100)	9
Italian Albums (FIMI)	77
Scottish Albums (OCC)	70
