= The Harmony Codex =

Studio album by Steven Wilson
- Released: 29 September 2023
- Recorded: 2021–December 2022
- Studio: Home studio (North London)
- Genre: Art rock; electronica; progressive rock
- Length: 64:02
- Label: Virgin (UK and Europe); Spinefarm (US)
- Producer: Steven Wilson

Steven Wilson chronology
The Future Bites (2021)	The Harmony Codex (2023)	The Overview (2025)

Singles from The Harmony Codex
- 1. "Economies of Scale" Released: 29 August 2023; 2. "Impossible Tightrope" Released: 5 September 2023; 3. "Rock Bottom" Released: 12 September 2023; 4. "What Life Brings" Released: 19 September 2023

Professional ratings
Review scores
Source	Rating
Classic Rock	4/5 stars
Sonic Perspectives	4.5/5 stars
Ghostcult Magazine	4.5/5 stars

The Harmony Codex is the seventh studio album by British musician Steven Wilson, released on 29 September 2023 through Virgin Music Group.

== Background ==
The record was first announced on 29 August 2023 with the release of lead single "Economies of Scale". Subsequently, the tracks "Impossible Tightrope", "Rock Bottom", and "What Life Brings" were released as singles.

The album is said to be "a genre-spanning collection that opens up like a musical puzzle box" and musically more complex than Wilson's previous album.

Along with the release of the standalone record, also released was a three-disc limited edition featuring a collection of bonus tracks under the name Harmonic Distortion.

== Recording ==
Steven Wilson supposedly worked on the album "in a studio tucked inside a garage of a North London townhouse", piecing together the tracks with remote help from collaborators Ninet Tayeb, Craig Blundell, Adam Holzman, Jack Dangers, and Sam Fogarino.

== Track listing ==
All tracks are written by Steven Wilson, except for "Economies of Scale" with Adam Holzman, and "Rock Bottom", written by Ninet Tayeb.

The Harmony Codex track listing
No.	Title	Length
1.	"Inclination"	7:15
2.	"What Life Brings"	3:40
3.	"Economies of Scale"	4:17
4.	"Impossible Tightrope"	10:42
5.	"Rock Bottom"	4:25
6.	"Beautiful Scarecrow"	5:22
7.	"The Harmony Codex"	9:50
8.	"Time Is Running Out"	3:57
9.	"Actual Brutal Facts"	5:05
10.	"Staircase"	9:26
Total length:		64:02

Harmonic Distortion track listing
No.	Title	Length
1.	"Codex Theme #7"	0:49
2.	"Economies of Scale" (Manic Street Preachers remix)	4:05
3.	"Codex Theme #9"	0:33
4.	"Inclination" (Faultline remix)	7:30
5.	"Impossible Tightrope" (alternate version)	10:11
6.	"Codex Theme #6"	1:07
7.	"Beautiful Scarecrow" (Meat Beat Manifesto excursion 1)	6:05
8.	"Codex Theme #8"	1:03
9.	"Time Is Running Out" (Mikael Åkerfeldt version)	3:47
10.	"Staircase" (Interpol remix)	6:47
11.	"Codex Theme #3"	1:03
12.	"What Life Brings" (Aug 22 mix by Roland Orzabal)	4:16
13.	"The Harmony Codex" (long take)	17:02
14.	"Staircase" (Radiophonic Workshop remix)	12:36
Total length:		76:14

The Harmony Codex digital deluxe edition bonus tracks
No.	Title	Length
11.	"What Life Brings" (Aug 22 mix by Roland Orzabal)	4:16
12.	"Time Is Running Out" (Mikael Åkerfeldt version)	3:47
13.	"The Harmony Codex – Audio Play / Part 1"	5:58
14.	"The Harmony Codex – Audio Play / Part 2"	7:32
15.	"The Harmony Codex – Audio Play / Part 3"	5:02
16.	"The Harmony Codex – Audio Play / Part 4"	6:11
17.	"The Harmony Codex – Audio Play / Part 5"	5:21
18.	"The Harmony Codex – Audio Play / Part 6"	5:21
Total length:		107:30

== Personnel ==
- Steven Wilson – vocals (tracks 1–6, 8–10), acoustic guitar (tracks 2–4, 8), ARP 2600 (tracks 1, 4, 7), audio feedback (track 9), bass guitar (tracks 3, 4, 7, 8, 10), celesta (track 8), Cobalt 8 synthesizer (tracks 4, 5, 7, 10), electric guitars (tracks 2, 4–6, 8, 9), electric piano (track 9), harp (tracks 4, 5), Hammond organ (tracks 2, 4, 10), horn (track 10), Mellotron (track 9), Moog Arpeggiator (track 10), Moog Sub 37 synthesizer (tracks 2, 4–9), percussion (tracks 2, 6), piano (except track 9), programming (tracks 1, 3, 4, 6, 8–10), Prophet-6 synthesizer (tracks 5, 7, 8), Rhodes piano (track 4), Solina Strings (tracks 2, 4, 6, 8–10 and track 9 on Harmonic Distortion), strings (tracks 3–7, 10), theremin (track 9 on Harmonic Distortion), voices (track 3)

Session musicians

- Adam Holzman – Rhodes piano (tracks 1, 4, 7), piano (track 9), DFAM loops (track 10), Modular synthesizer (tracks 1, 3, 6), Moog synthesizer solo (track 10), Wurlitzer organ (track 5)
- Ben Coleman – violin (track 4)
- Craig Blundell – drums (tracks 2, 5, 6, 10), hi-hat (track 9), percussion (tracks 6, 9)
- David Kollar – lead guitar (tracks 1, 9), ambient guitar (track 4)
- David Kosten – programming (tracks 1, 10)
- Guy Pratt – bass guitar (track 2)
- Jack Dangers – electric beats (track 6), programming (track 9)
- Jason Cooper – tom drum (track 6)
- Lee Harris – psychedelic guitar (track 4)
- Nate Wood – drums (track 4)
- Nick Beggs – Chapman Stick (tracks 6, 10)
- Niko Tsonev – guitars (tracks 1, 4, 10), lead guitar (tracks 5, 8, 10)
- Nate Navarro – fretless bass (track 1), bass guitar (track 9)
- Nils Petter Molvær – trumpet (track 1)
- Ninet Tayeb – vocals (track 5), guitars (track 5), backing vocals (tracks 1, 2)
- Pat Mastelotto – drums (track 1), percussion (track 1)
- Rotem Wilson – voices (tracks 7, 10)
- Samuel Fogarino – drums (track 10)
- Theo Travis – flute (track 1), saxophone (track 4), duduk (track 6)

Session musicians on Harmonic Distortion

- Aaron Sterling – drums (track 12)
- Adam Holzman – piano (tracks 8, 9)
- Ben Coleman – violin (track 5)
- Doug Petty – keyboards (track 12), strings arrangements (track 12)
- James Dean Bradfield – guitars (track 2)
- Mikael Åkerfeldt – vocals (track 9)
- Nate Navarro – bass guitar (track 5)
- Nicky Wire – bass guitar (track 2)
- Roland Orzabal – keyboards (track 12), programming (track 12)
- Sean Moore – drums (track 2)

Production

- Steven Wilson – production, mixing (tracks 1–5, 9 and tracks 1, 3–5, 8, 11–13 on Harmonic Distortion)
- Adam Holzman – mixing (track 3)
- David Kosten – additional production (tracks 1, 5, 6, 8–10), mixing (tracks 5, 10)
- Josef E-Shine – additional production (track 5)
- Loz Williams – production (track 2 on Harmonic Distortion), engineering (track 2 on Harmonic Distortion)
- Manic Street Preachers – production (track 2 on Harmonic Distortion), engineering (track 2 on Harmonic Distortion)
- Dave Eringa – remixing (track 2 on Harmonic Distortion)
- Jack Dangers – additional production (track 7 on Harmonic Distortion), remixing (track 7 on Harmonic Distortion)
- Interpol – remixing (track 10 on Harmonic Distortion)
- Roland Orzabal – additional production (track 12 on Harmonic Distortion)
- Mark Ayres – production (track 14 on Harmonic Distortion)
- Matt Colton – mastering
- Carl Glover – design, photography
- Hajo Müller – photography

== Charts ==
Chart performance for The Harmony Codex
Chart (2023)	Peak position
Australian Albums (ARIA)	72
Austrian Albums (Ö3 Austria)	9
Belgian Albums (Ultratop Flanders)	18
Belgian Albums (Ultratop Wallonia)	12
Dutch Albums (Album Top 100)	2
Finnish Albums (Suomen virallinen lista)	13
French Albums (SNEP)	25
Italian Albums (FIMI)	18
German Albums (Offizielle Top 100)	3
Hungarian Physical Albums (MAHASZ)	36
Polish Albums (ZPAV)	7
Scottish Albums (Official Charts)	1
Spanish Albums (Promusicae)	20
Swiss Albums (Schweizer Hitparade)	5
UK Albums (Official Charts)	4
UK Album Downloads (Official Charts)	2
UK Progressive Albums (Official Charts)	1
UK Rock & Metal Albums (Official Charts)	1
