= Pariah (Steven Wilson song) =

2017 song by Steven Wilson

Single by Steven Wilson

from the album To the Bone
- Released: 9 May 2017
- Recorded: December 2016 – April 2017
- Studio: Strangeways (London); Angel Recording Studios (London); Studio Du Flon (Lausanne)
- Genre: Pop rock, Post-rock
- Length: 4:46
- Label: Caroline International
- Songwriter(s): Wilson
- Producer(s): Wilson; Paul Stacey

Steven Wilson singles chronology
"Happiness Ill" (2016)	"Pariah" (2017)	"The Same Asylum as Before" (2017)

Music video
- "Pariah" on YouTube

"Pariah" is a song by British-progressive rock musician Steven Wilson, it was first released on 9 May 2017 as the first single in promotion of his fifth studio album To the Bone. The track is one of six songs to feature singer Ninet Tayeb on vocals, with the track having the two alternating lead vocals throughout. A music video was released in promotion of the single on 18 May 2017.

== Reception ==
Greg Kennelty of Metal Injection described the track as hypnotic and beautiful, furthermore describing it as an "achy ballad". They also noted that the track's lyrics reinforced the albums concept of "modern paranoia, sorrow, and dependence on technology". Thom Jurek of AllMusic liked the track, stating how "the lithe harmonic architecture with lilting synths, restrained guitars, and loops creates a backdrop for his vulnerable delivery". Furthermore, Tayeb's "refrain resonates with emotional authority and encouragement for the protagonist's doubt". Overall, they described the track as being similar to Peter Gabriel and Kate Bush's "Don't Give Up". Benjamin Bland of Drowned in Sound also praised Tayeb's vocal performance on the track, stating the track "makes the most of the excellent vocal support of Ninet Tayeb".

Benjamin Kuettel of Sputnik Music described the vocal performance of Wilson and Tayeb as a "mournful duet". The Prog Report described the track as being a "gorgeous slo-mo duet" that "pushes and pulls over the pressures of modern life". Furthermore, explaining how the track is half "melancholia and euphoria" and half "elegiac ballad" and "sandstorm guitar wipeout". Joe DiVita of Loudwire described the track as featuring "a gentle, warm opening like the first rays of light stretching over the horizon as a simple melody flutters around the mix". Further stating that the track "serves as the foundation for the song, maintaining a floating atmosphere as the prog luminary trades off lines with a female singer".

== Personnel ==
Musicians

- Steven Wilson – vocals, guitar, bass guitar, keyboards, production
- Ninet Tayeb – vocals
- Adam Holzman – piano
- Craig Blundell – drums

Production

- Paul Stacey – engineering and co-production
- Lasse Hoile – photography, cover art and album design
