= Requiem for a Village =

Studio album by Steven Wilson
- Released: 6 November 2026
- Studio: Home studio (North London)
- Genre: Progressive rock
- Length: 54:05
- Label: Fiction
- Producer: Steven Wilson

Steven Wilson chronology
The Overview (2025)	Requiem for a Village (2026)

Singles from Requiem for a Village
- 1. "Requiem for a Village" Released: 11 September 2026; 2. "On Chapel Slope" Released: 2 October 2026; 3. "A Basket of Bees" Released: 26 October 2026; 4. "Now Departing" Released: 9 November 2026

Requiem for a Village is the ninth studio album by the English progressive rock musician Steven Wilson, released on 6 November 2026 via Fiction Records.

The concept album is set in an isolated, fictional village somewhere in the British Isles, whose inhabitants maintain their own customs and traditions. It takes inspiration from the 1975 British folk horror film of the same name, as well as British folk music, literature and television programmes from the late 1960s and early 1970s.

The album features spoken-word passages written by Andy Partridge and narrated by actor David Tennant. Musically, Wilson combines progressive rock with folk and experimental elements, adopting an analogue-oriented recording approach that deliberately embraces imperfections and spontaneous performances. Contributors include multi-instrumentalist Randy McStine, drummer Russell Holzman and vocalist Katherine Priddy.

== Composition and lyrics ==
Wilson conceived the album as a contrast to his previous studio album, The Overview (2025), which explored the universe and the cosmos. In contrast, Requiem for a Village focuses on a fictional, unnamed rural community somewhere in the British Isles. Wilson described the village as a composite of places he had encountered in films, books and family holidays, rather than a specific real location. Its inhabitants live in relative isolation from the modern world, maintaining their own customs and traditions. The setting appears idyllic on the surface but conceals unsettling and sinister elements.

The album takes its title from the 1975 British film Requiem for a Village, directed by David Gladwell, which served as an inspiration for the project. The film depicts the rural past of a Suffolk village through the memories of an elderly graveyard caretaker. Wilson also cited folk horror films such as The Wicker Man and television series such as The Prisoner as influences. Other inspirations included British children's television programmes from the late 1960s and early 1970s, including Bagpuss, Catweazle, Trumpton and The Magic Roundabout.

The village's mythology includes the idea that its inhabitants remain part of the landscape after death. Wilson explained that, in the fictional community, deceased men become stones that guard the village, while women become birds in the surrounding woods.

The album's spoken-word passages were written by Andy Partridge of XTC, with Dylan Thomas's Under Milk Wood serving as a literary reference. They are performed by Scottish actor David Tennant, whom Wilson selected for his ability to deliver the text naturally and with a regional accent.

Wilson cited British folk-rock artists and groups including The Incredible String Band, Comus, Jan Dukes de Grey, Third Ear Band, T. Rex, Donovan and Magna Carta among the album's musical influences. The title track developed from a drum-and-bass loop supplied by drummer Russell Holzman, which Wilson adapted into a composition combining drum and bass, progressive rock and experimental metal. The violin drone forming the basis of "On Chapel Slope" was inspired by the raga-like music of Third Ear Band.

== Recording and production ==
Wilson adopted an unconventional recording approach intended to preserve imperfections and spontaneous performances. He favoured analogue synthesizers and deliberately imperfect tuning, and experimented with instruments he had little experience playing, including violin, oboe and drums. He also used microtonal intervals on acoustic guitar. Wilson described the approach as a reaction against artificial intelligence and corrective studio technologies.

Guitarist and multi-instrumentalist Randy McStine was Wilson's principal collaborator on the album. The two co-wrote several compositions, with McStine contributing to the arrangements and sound design. Wilson also worked with Holzman on the drum performances. According to Wilson, approximately two-thirds of the album was recorded through in-session performances by the trio, which were subsequently expanded with overdubs.

The deluxe edition includes a 17-minute composition titled "Requiem for a Village – The Original Soundtrack". Wilson described it as a piece of musique concrète incorporating sound-design material developed during the album sessions. It includes the complete performance of the traditional murder ballad "Cruel Sister", sung by vocalist Katherine Priddy. Wilson electronically processed Priddy's voice and used it as the basis for additional musical material.

== Promotion and release ==
On 11 September 2026, Wilson announced the album's release date and issued its title track, accompanied by the first "Village Hall Session" video. The second single, "On Chapel Slope", was released on 2 October, alongside a music video directed by Mike Bennion. "A Basket of Bees", the third single, followed on 26 October, accompanied by another "Village Hall Session".

On 22 September, Wilson hosted a DJ set titled "Songs from the Village" at The Social in London. The programme featured music by artists and groups that influenced the album, including Boards of Canada, Demdike Stare and Third Ear Band, as well as material from 1970s British children's television. Proceeds from ticket sales were donated to the charity Here 2 Belong.

The limited-edition three-disc box set includes a 96-page hardback book, two CDs and a Blu-ray disc. The second CD contains seven additional tracks, while the Blu-ray includes high-resolution stereo, 5.1 surround sound and Dolby Atmos mixes, as well as an instrumental stereo mix of the main album and high-resolution versions of the bonus material.

Wilson also released a mock up website for the album, akin to the fictional blog that he released for Hand. Cannot. Erase. album's protagonist. The website resembles 1990s websites in style and imitates a local town message board, listing news and concurrent events among other typical information about the village. The website link was listed at the bottom of the YouTube video description of only two album tracks and as such was a little bit of an easter egg for the curious.

== Reception ==
Professional ratings
Aggregate scores
Source	Rating
Metacritic	82/100
Review scores
Source	Rating
AllMusic	4/5 stars
Louder	4/5 stars
Mojo	4/5 stars
musicOMH	3/5 stars
OndaRock	8/10 stars
Uncut	8/10 stars

At review aggregator Metacritic, Requiem for a Village received a weighted average score of 82 out of 100, based on seven reviews from professional critics.

Critics generally praised the album's atmosphere and conceptual approach. Steve Joyce of The Prog Report commended the integration of its music and narrative, describing the album as the audio equivalent of a folk-horror film and comparing it favourably with Wilson's 2015 album Hand. Cannot. Erase.. Chris Roberts of Louder highlighted its combination of gothic folk, heavy rock and references to British horror cinema and 1970s television, while praising the restrained use of David Tennant's narration. Laetitia Mavrel of Sound of Violence similarly praised the immersive quality of the extended instrumental passages and the relationship between the narration and music.

The album's production and performances also attracted attention. Gianfranco Marmoro of OndaRock praised its dramatic intensity and conceptual coherence, particularly noting the contrast between Wilson's meticulous production and the deliberate imperfections in the instrumental performances, which he considered central to the album's human character.

Some reviewers, however, noted the album's demanding and unconventional structure. Maël Minot of Radio Metal described it as one of Wilson's more distinctive works, praising its sound design and organic instrumentation while observing that its fragmented and eclectic arrangements required attentive listening. Chris White of musicOMH similarly praised Wilson's artistic vision and musical virtuosity, singling out "Murmuration" and "A Basket of Bees" as highlights, but considered the album uneven, occasionally abrasive and difficult to appreciate without sustained attention.

== Track listing ==
All lyrics are written by Andy Partridge, except where noted; all music is composed by Steven Wilson, except where noted.

No.	Title	Lyrics	Music	Length
1.	"Swirl in a Lark's Eye"			2:41
2.	"Requiem for a Village"	Wilson		7:55
3.	"The Same River Twice"	Wilson, Partridge		3:23
4.	"Now Departing"	Wilson		7:20
5.	"Hiraeth"	Instrumental	Wilson, Randy McStine	2:24
6.	"On Chapel Slope"			4:53
7.	"Murmuration"		Wilson, McStine	7:16
8.	"Cursus Fingerprint"			2:42
9.	"A Basket of Bees"			4:33
10.	"Great Green Map"			5:08
11.	"Wheel"	Wilson	Wilson, McStine	3:54
12.	"The Old God Is Buried"			2:00
Total length:				54:05

Bonus disc (boxset only)
No.	Title	Lyrics	Music	Length
1.	"Low Requiem"	Instrumental		2:41
2.	"Requiem for a Village - demo version"	Wilson		9:11
3.	"Born but Never Asked"	Wilson		4:09
4.	"Steeple Song"	Wilson		2:42
5.	"On Chapel Slope - Katherine Priddy version"			5:57
6.	"Valentinesque"	Wilson		4:55
7.	"Requiem for a Village - The Original Soundtrack"	Traditional	Wilson, McStine	17:09
Total length:				46:44

== Personnel ==
Credits adapted from the album booklet.

=== Musicians ===
- Steven Wilson – lead vocals, guitars, bass guitar, keyboards, synthesisers, strings, horns, oboe, recorder, drums, percussion, chanting, sound design
- Randy McStine – guitars, backing vocals, chanting, bass guitar, keyboards, synthesisers, accordion, lyre harp, theremin, drums, percussion, sound design
- Russell Holzman – drums (tracks 2, 4, 9 and 11)
- David Tennant – narration (tracks 1, 3, 7, 8, 10 and 12)
- Adam Holzman – modular synthesiser (track 4)
- Katherine Priddy – vocals on the "Cruel Sister" passage (track 7)
- Lee Harris – psychedelic guitar (track 8)

=== Production and artwork ===
- Steven Wilson – production, mixing
- Andy Partridge – additional production input
- Randy McStine – additional production input
- Kevin Westenberg – photography
- Edwin Ingram – photographic technician
- Richard Barbieri, Tomasz Desperak, Doug Hamm, Carl Glover/Carl Glover Archive, Michael Kicker and Richard Shipp – additional photography
- Carl Glover – graphic design

== Charts ==
Chart performance for Requiem for a Village
Chart (2026)	Peak position
Australian Albums (ARIA)	49
Austrian Albums (Ö3 Austria)	4
Belgian Albums (Ultratop Flanders)	10
Belgian Albums (Ultratop Wallonia)	6
Dutch Albums (Album Top 100)	2
Finnish Albums (Suomen virallinen lista)	13
French Albums (SNEP)	41
French Rock & Metal Albums (SNEP)	3
German Albums (Offizielle Top 100)	1
German Rock & Metal Albums (Offizielle Top 100)	1
Irish Independent Albums (IRMA)	23
Italian Albums (FIMI)	7
Norwegian Physical Albums (IFPI Norge)	3
Polish Albums (ZPAV)	6
Scottish Albums (Official Charts)	4
Swedish Hard Rock Albums (Sverigetopplistan)	15
Swedish Physical Albums (Sverigetopplistan)	7
Swiss Albums (Schweizer Hitparade)	1
UK Albums (Official Charts)	6
UK Independent Albums (Official Charts)	1
UK Rock & Metal Albums (Official Charts)	2
US Independent Albums (Billboard)	30
US Top Album Sales (Billboard)	9
