= Catalogue / Preserve / Amass =

Live album by Steven Wilson
- Released: 8 February 2012
- Recorded: October 2011
- Genre: Progressive rock
- Length: 70:11
- Producer: Steven Wilson

Steven Wilson live albums chronology
Catalogue / Preserve / Amass (2012)	Get All You Deserve (2012)

Catalogue / Preserve / Amass is a live album released in 2012 by British musician and record producer Steven Wilson.

== Track listing ==
All tracks are written by Steven Wilson.

No.	Title	Length
1.	"No Twilight Within the Courts of the Sun"	10:54
2.	"Index"	5:03
3.	"Deform to Form a Star"	8:29
4.	"Sectarian"	7:22
5.	"No Part of Me"	6:04
6.	"Veneno Para Las Hadas"	7:27
7.	"Raider II"	24:52

Original releases: Tracks #1 and 6 from album Insurgentes; tracks No. 2, 3, 4, 5 and 7 from Grace for Drowning.

=== Limited Vinyl Edition ===
On April 21, 2012, a limited vinyl edition was released as part of Record Store Day. This edition is limited to 2,000 copies, and has a condensed track list:

Side A

1. Index
2. Deform to Form a Star
3. No Part of Me

Side B

1. Raider II

== Personnel ==
- Steven Wilson – vocals, guitars, keyboards
- Aziz Ibrahim – guitars
- Nick Beggs – bass guitar, Chapman stick, backing vocals
- Adam Holzman – keyboards, piano
- Theo Travis – flute, saxophone
- Marco Minnemann – drums
