= Niko Tsonev =

Bulgarian musician

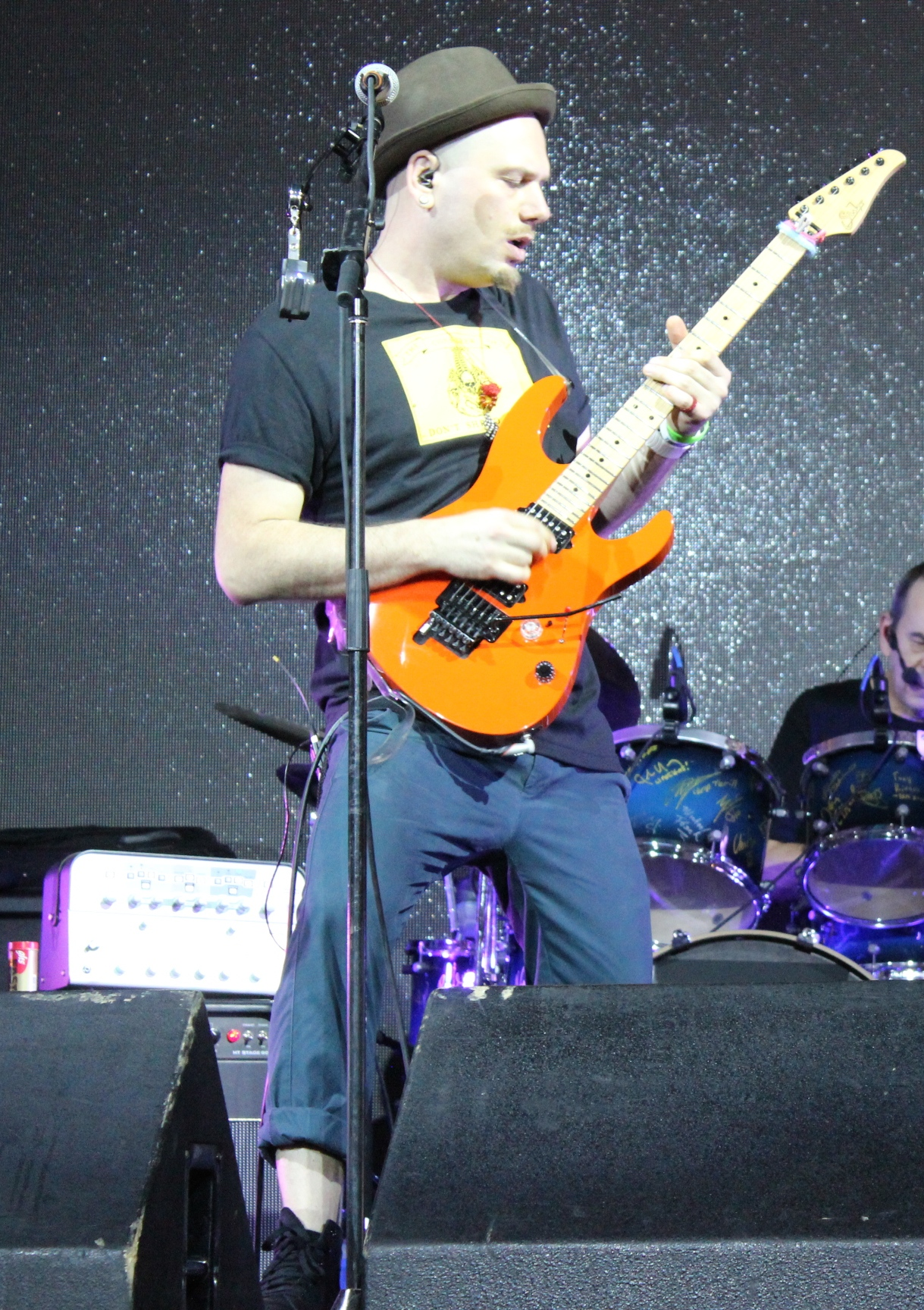
Niko Tsonev

Niko Tsonev is a Bulgarian-born musician, producer, composer, mixing engineer, and arranger living in London, England. At age four, Tsonev played accordion; later he began playing guitar but only in his early teen years Tsonev began formally taking music theory and guitar lessons. Aged seventeen, he received a scholarship from Berklee College of Music (Boston, MA), however, Tsonev moved to London, England to study Music Production at Lewisham College. At that time (1996) Tsonev also joined a musician session agency as a freelance guitarist.

== Career ==
In younger years, Tsonev drew his musical inspiration from artists such as Steve Vai, Jimmy Herring and Scott Henderson. In the following years Tsonev performed and recorded as a solo artist and creative freelancer, and with diverse artists and producers, including Steven Wilson (Porcupine Tree), JJ Grey & Mofro, Digitonal, Aquilina and FabGrease Quentin). Stylistically flexible and diverse in urban and world music, Tsonev's guitar instrumentals encompass various musical forms, from instrumental fusion of jazz and blues, to Americana, shred and progressive rock. Tsonev is also a film and TV composer, known for his work on The Mortician (2011) directed by Gareth Maxwell Roberts, The Bridge (2005) directed by Richard Raymond, and Steven Wilson: Get All You Deserve (2012) directed by Lasse Hoile. Tsonev has performed in various countries and venues across the globe, from touring the United States, South America and Europe with Steven Wilson in 2012 to performing gigs with Lifesigns throughout Europe, and recording a DVD album Lifesigns - Live In London - Under The Bridge Tsonev sources various equipment while in studio and onstage, including Suhr Guitars, Elixir Strings, Kemper Amps, TC Electronic, Wampler, Source Audio, Hughes & Kettner.

Tsonev was a member of Lifesigns, a British progressive rock band; with other notable band's members such as John Young on keyboards and vocals, Jon Poole on bass and vocals, Martin "Frosty" Beedle on drums, percussion and vocals. Tsonev performed (on guitars and vocals) with Lifesigns between January 2013 and August 2016.

== Awards ==
- The 2015 No. 4 Best Guitarist voted by the readers of Prog
- The 2015 No. 8 Best Guitarist by the Classic Rock Society

== Discography ==
Tsonev's work includes albums both as a solo artist, and in collaboration with other musicians and bands.

=== Main solo releases ===
- Black Feather (2008)
- Banshees and Harpsichords (2013)
- Moonparticle (2018)
- Early Tapes (Vol.1) (2024)
- Early Tapes (Vol. 2) (2024)

=== Solo singles and EPs ===
- "Supra" - EP (2003)
- "It Sounds Prettier In French" - EP (2004)
- "The Bridge (Orchestral Score)" (2005)
- "The Death Orchestra" - EP (2006)
- "Nix Hydra" - EP (2011)

=== With other artists ===
With Lacryma Christi

- Futura (Writing, Guitars, Production), 1996

With The Big Other

- You're The Girl Of My Dreams - EP (Writing, Guitars, Production), 1998

With Cuthead / Dominik Rüegg

- Walkabout (Guest Guitar), 2007

With Digitonal

- Save Your Light For Darker Days (Acoustic Guitars), 2008

With Mr. Fastfinger

- The Way of the Exploding Guitar (Guest Guitar), 2009

With Italee

- Tight Suga (Guitar Solos), 2010

With Steven Wilson

- Get All You Deserve (Live Blu-ray / DVD / CD), 2012
- The Raven that Refused to Sing (Demo versions - Disc 2), 2013
- The Harmony Codex, 2023
- The Overview, 2025

With Lifesigns

- Lifesigns Live in London - Under the Bridge (Live DVD / CD), 2015
- Cardington (Guitars), 2017

With Asia

- Asia: Symfonia - Live In Bulgaria 2013 (Live Blu-ray / DVD / CD) (Mixing Engineer), 2017

=== Labels ===
- NTM
- Elektrik Pyjamas
- Stunted Records
- Quatierfrancais
- KScope
- Esoteric Antenna
