= To the Bone (Steven Wilson album) =

Studio album by Steven Wilson
- Released: 18 August 2017
- Recorded: December 2016 – April 2017
- Studios: Strangeways (London); Angel Recording Studios (London); Studio Du Flon (Lausanne)
- Genres: Progressive pop; rock
- Length: 59:46
- Label: Caroline International
- Producers: Steven Wilson, Paul Stacey

Steven Wilson chronology
4½ (2016)	To the Bone (2017)	Home Invasion: In Concert at the Royal Albert Hall (2018)

Singles from To the Bone
- 1. "Pariah" Released: 9 May 2017; 2. "The Same Asylum as Before" Released: 2 June 2017; 3. "Song of I" Released: 9 June 2017; 4. "Permanating" Released: 30 June 2017; 5. "Refuge" Released: 3 August 2017

To the Bone (stylised to the bone) is the fifth studio album by British musician Steven Wilson, released on 18 August 2017 on Caroline International. It became Wilson's highest-charting album, reaching number 3 on the UK Albums Chart and the US Billboard Independent Albums chart.

== History ==
In late 2016, Wilson announced that he had returned to the studio to record his fifth album. During the first months of 2017, Wilson released two work-in-progress studio clips to his YouTube channel. On 5 January, he released a clip of "Pariah" and on 12 February, he released a clip of "To the Bone", featuring harmonica player Mark Feltham. Wilson continued to tease various images and small album details until 8 May when he revealed the track listing on his Instagram account and released the single "Pariah". The following day on his Instagram, he announced the album and an upcoming 2018 European tour, and the following week, on 18 May, a music video was released for "Pariah". Four further singles were eventually released: "The Same Asylum As Before", "Song of I", "Permanating" and "Refuge". A video for "Song of I" featuring performance artist Maya Petrovna was released online on 9 June. A video for "Permanating" featuring a Bollywood dance troupe was released online on 21 July. A video for "Nowhere Now" was released on 19 September. A video for "The Same Asylum as Before" was released on 31 January 2019.

== Concept and sound ==
According to Wilson, the album was inspired by the progressive pop records of his youth, such as Peter Gabriel's So, Kate Bush's Hounds of Love, Talk Talk's The Colour of Spring, and Tears for Fears' The Seeds of Love.

== Critical reception ==
Professional ratings
Aggregate scores
Source	Rating
Metacritic	77/100
Review scores
Source	Rating
AllMusic	4/5 stars
Classic Rock	4/5 stars
Drowned in Sound	4/10
Mojo	4/5 stars
Planet Rock	5/5 stars
PopMatters	7/10 stars
Q	4/5 stars
The Quietus	3/5 stars
Sputnikmusic	4.5/5

To The Bone received mostly positive reviews from critics. Metacritic, a review aggregator, gave the album a normalised rating of 77 out of 100, indicating "generally favorable reviews", based on reviews from 12 critics.

Uncut magazine stated: "Wilson's fifth solo LP is a lush and ambitious piece of progressive pop music. Hitting on some heavy influences, including Peter Gabriel, Depeche Mode, Bends-era Radiohead, and Todd Rundgren's electronic ballads, this insistently melodic, 11-song set is an old-school, sum-of-its parts experience". Planet Rock rated the album five stars, commenting that "Steven Wilson delivers his progressive masterpiece". Jordan Blum of Rebel Noise magazine said: "To the Bone is both a great album in its own right and a perfectly appropriate addition to Wilson's vast body of work". Sputnikmusic rated the album 4.5/5, stating: "Steven Wilson proves that an artist can venture into uncharted musical waters, even 30 years into their career, for ambitious and vibrant results like these".

The Quietus' Antonio Poscic criticised the album's "edgeless approach ... underlined by the warm, lush production that tries to recreate the fondly and wrongly remembered organic sound of old records. ... Ironically, the song that will surely be most controversial among his fans, 'Permanating', is a self-contained, resounding success ... To the Bone would have been a better album if it had completely embraced this sort of levity." Drowned in Sound's Benjamin Bland felt Wilson "focused more on the idea of writing a pop record than on actually delivering the goods. There are hooks here, but they are scattered and often attached to tracks that come worryingly close to mediocre exercises in MOR." Rob Pociluk of Progressive Music Planet called it "a poorly written, poorly arranged, disjointed collection of substandard songs. It's not prog but that's not why I don't like it."

=== Accolades ===
PopMatters elected it the best progressive rock and metal album of 2017.

== Track listing ==
All tracks are written by Steven Wilson, except "To the Bone" with lyrics by Andy Partridge.

No.	Title	Length
1.	"To the Bone"	6:41
2.	"Nowhere Now"	4:03
3.	"Pariah"	4:46
4.	"The Same Asylum as Before"	5:14
5.	"Refuge"	6:43
6.	"Permanating"	3:34
7.	"Blank Tapes"	2:08
8.	"People Who Eat Darkness"	6:02
9.	"Song of I"	5:21
10.	"Detonation"	9:19
11.	"Song of Unborn"	5:55
Total length:		59:46

Deluxe edition bonus disc (CD)
No.	Title	Length
1.	"Ask Me Nicely (intro)"	1:42
2.	"A Door Marked Summer"	7:41
3.	"Pariah" (demo)	4:58
4.	"People Who Eat Darkness" (demo)	5:35
5.	"Refuge" (demo)	4:59
6.	"The Same Asylum as Before" (demo)	5:32
7.	"Ask Me Nicely"	3:53
8.	"Northern Cyclonic"	3:50
9.	"Detonation" (demo)	10:18
10.	"Song of Unborn" (demo)	6:56

== Personnel ==
- Steven Wilson – vocals, keyboards (all tracks), guitars (all tracks except track 9), bass guitar (tracks 1–3, 5, 8 and 11), production

Additional personnel

- Ninet Tayeb – vocals (tracks 3, 7 and 8), backing vocals (tracks 1, 4 and 6)
- David Kollar – guitars (tracks 9 and 10)
- Paul Stacey – guitar solo (track 5)
- Nick Beggs – bass (track 6 and 9)
- Robin Mullarkey – bass (tracks 4 and 10)
- Adam Holzman – piano (all tracks except track 8), clavinet (track 1), organ (tracks 1, 2, 5 and 6), Solina strings (tracks 5 and 10)
- Craig Blundell – drums (tracks 3, 8, 9 and 11)
- Jeremy Stacey – drums (tracks 1, 2, 4-6 and 10)
- Pete Eckford – percussion (tracks 1, 2, 6, 8 and 10)

- Mark Feltham – harmonica (tracks 1 and 5)
- Sophie Hunger – vocals (track 9)
- Jasmine Walkes – spoken word (track 1)
- David Kilminster – backing vocals (tracks 1, 2, 4 and 11)
- Dave Stewart – string arrangements (tracks 2, 4, 9, 10 and 11)
- The London Session Orchestra – strings (tracks 4, 9, 10 and 11)
- Synergy Vocals – choir (track 11)
- Paul Draper – sequencer (track 1)
- Andy Partridge – lyrics (track 1)

Production

- Paul Stacey – engineering and co-production
- Lasse Hoile – photography, cover art and album design

== Charts ==
Chart (2017)	Peak position
Australian Albums (ARIA)	30
Austrian Albums (Ö3 Austria)	7
Belgian Albums (Ultratop Flanders)	14
Belgian Albums (Ultratop Wallonia)	9
Canadian Albums (Billboard)	28
Czech Albums (ČNS IFPI)	34
Dutch Albums (Album Top 100)	4
Finnish Albums (Suomen virallinen lista)	1
French Albums (SNEP)	24
German Albums (Offizielle Top 100)	2
Irish Albums (IRMA)	43
Italian Albums (FIMI)	14
New Zealand Heatseeker Albums (RMNZ)	5
Norwegian Albums (VG-lista)	15
Polish Albums (ZPAV)	14
Scottish Albums (Official Charts)	2
Spanish Albums (Promusicae)	15
Swedish Albums (Sverigetopplistan)	26
Swiss Albums (Schweizer Hitparade)	4
UK Albums (Official Charts)	3
US Billboard 200	58
US Independent Albums (Billboard)	3
US Top Rock Albums (Billboard)	8
