= Get All You Deserve =

2012 live DVD by Steven Wilson

Video and live album by Steven Wilson
- Released: 24 September 2012
- Recorded: 13 April 2012
- Venue: Teatro Metropólitan (Mexico City, Mexico)
- Genre: Progressive rock
- Length: 122:21
- Label: Kscope
- Director: Lasse Hoile
- Producer: Steven Wilson

Steven Wilson video chronology
Get All You Deserve (2012)	Home Invasion: In Concert at the Royal Albert Hall (2018)

Steven Wilson live albums chronology
Catalogue / Preserve / Amass (2012)	Get All You Deserve (2012)	Home Invasion: In Concert at the Royal Albert Hall (2018)

Professional ratings
Review scores
Source	Rating
Allmusic	3.5/5 stars
Imperiumi	8.75/10 stars

Get All You Deserve is the first live DVD and second live album by progressive rock musician Steven Wilson, released on 24 September 2012. It was filmed at a sold-out show in Mexico City, Mexico, during his Grace for Drowning tour. The deluxe edition of Get All You Deserve consists of two CDs, a DVD and a Blu-ray disc.

== Track listing ==
All songs written and composed by Steven Wilson.

DVD/Blu-ray
No.	Title	Album	Length
1.	"Intro ('Citadel')"	Cenotaph (Bass Communion album)
2.	"No Twilight Within the Courts of the Sun"	Insurgentes
3.	"Index"	Grace for Drowning
4.	"Deform to Form a Star"	Grace for Drowning
5.	"Sectarian"	Grace for Drowning
6.	"Postcard"	Grace for Drowning
7.	"Remainder the Black Dog"	Grace for Drowning
8.	"Harmony Korine"	Insurgentes
9.	"Abandoner"	Insurgentes
10.	"Like Dust I Have Cleared From My Eye"	Grace for Drowning
11.	"Luminol"	previously unreleased, later on The Raven That Refused to Sing (And Other Stories)
12.	"Veneno Para Las Hadas"	Insurgentes
13.	"No Part of Me"	Grace for Drowning
14.	"Raider II"	Grace for Drowning
15.	"Get All You Deserve"	Insurgentes
16.	"Outro ('Litany')"	Litany (Bass Communion album)

CD – Disc 1
No.	Title	Length
1.	"No Twilight Within the Courts of the Sun"	10:23
2.	"Index"	5:01
3.	"Deform to Form a Star"	8:40
4.	"Sectarian"	7:41
5.	"Postcard"	4:52
6.	"Remainder the Black Dog"	10:03
7.	"Harmony Korine"	5:07
8.	"Abandoner"	5:03
9.	"Like Dust I Have Cleared from My Eye"	6:32

CD – Disc 2
No.	Title	Length
1.	"Luminol"	12:19
2.	"Veneno Para Las Hadas"	7:01
3.	"No Part of Me"	6:09
4.	"Raider II"	26:02
5.	"Get All You Deserve"	7:23

== Personnel ==
Performers

- Steven Wilson – vocals, guitar, mellotron, piano, other keyboards
- Adam Holzman – keyboards
- Marco Minnemann – drums
- Nick Beggs – bass guitar, stick, backing vocals
- Niko Tsonev – guitar
- Theo Travis – saxophone, flute, clarinet, keyboards

Additional personnel

- Lasse Hoile – director, editor, concert visuals, concert photography
- Steven Wilson – sound remixing
- Ian Bond – front of house sound
- Paul van der Heijkant – concert lighting
- Grant Wakefield – director of 'Litany' film
- Joe del Tufo – concert photography
- Diana Nitschke – concert photography
- Susana Moyaho – additional photographs
- Nancy Akl – additional photographs
- Jasmine Walkes – additional photographs
- Carl Glover (for Aleph) – design
