= The Future Bites =

Studio album by Steven Wilson
- Released: 29 January 2021
- Recorded: May 2019 – early 2020
- Studios: Mutley Ranch, London; Snap Studios, London
- Genres: Synth-pop; electronic
- Length: 41:59
- Label: Caroline International
- Producers: Steven Wilson; David Kosten

Steven Wilson chronology
Home Invasion: In Concert at the Royal Albert Hall (2018)	The Future Bites (2021)	The Harmony Codex (2023)

Singles from The Future Bites
- 1. "Personal Shopper" Released: 12 March 2020; 2. "Eminent Sleaze" Released: 22 September 2020; 3. "King Ghost" Released: 29 October 2020; 4. "12 Things I Forgot" Released: 24 November 2020; 5. "Man of the People" Released: 26 January 2021

The Future Bites (stylised as THE FUTURE BITES™) is the sixth studio album by British musician Steven Wilson. The album was initially set for release on 12 June 2020 through Caroline International, (his second and final album on the label) but later was pushed back to 29 January 2021 due to the COVID-19 pandemic, which affected the marketing and production related to the album. It was co-produced by Wilson and David Kosten and recorded in London.

== Background and themes ==
The album deals with "two recurring themes" of Wilson's musical output, identity and technology, with a press release noting that it "picks apart our 21st century utopia, while also allowing for moments of personal growth and optimism". It was also called "less a bleak vision of an approaching dystopia, more a curious reading of the here and now", and lead single "Personal Shopper" was noted to expand on the electronic elements of Wilson's previous work, "fully diving into dance and neo-disco while somehow keeping a rock edge".

== Marketing and promotion ==
The marketing campaign of the album is based around The Future Bites, a fictional high end designer brand primarily inspired by Off-White, Supreme and Virgil Abloh. The Future Bites also has its own website and social media profiles, including an online store that acts as both a storefront for the album's various editions and fake products supposedly created by the brand.

Wilson has released several promotional videos that feature The Future Bites and there is a loose narrative concept that spans multiple timeframes.

For example, the music video for "Eminent Sleaze" depicts a post-apocalyptic dystopian future in the year 2032 where The Future Bites have become the world's largest global corporation and through excessive consumerism cause the earth's population to rapidly decline. The Black Mirror inspired music video for "Personal Shopper" is set in a present-day shopping mall and features a dark narrative twist - in order to purchase products in the shopping mall, the consumer must sacrifice a body part that corresponds to the product they are buying. Director Lucrecia Taormina said of the concept for the video that she "wanted to create a fictional world in which people buy goods and the transaction would not only be money but also a part of their body, alluding to the concept of the more you look for answers outside, the more you disappear on the inside."

A music video for "Self", released on 1 February 2021, makes use of deepfake imagery to transform Steven Wilson into Donald Trump, Joe Biden, Robert Downey Jr., Scarlett Johansson, Mark Zuckerberg, David Bowie, Harrison Ford, Paul McCartney, Daniel Radcliffe, and many more notable public figures.

== Critical reception ==
Professional ratings
Aggregate scores
Source	Rating
Metacritic	74/100
Review scores
Source	Rating
AllMusic	3/5 stars
American Songwriter	4/5 stars
Classic Rock	3.5/5 stars
The Guardian	4/5 stars
Kerrang!	3/5
PopMatters	8/10 stars
Prog Radio	3.5/5 stars
Slant Magazine	3.5/5 stars
Sputnikmusic	2.8/5

The Future Bites was met with "generally favorable" reviews from critics. At Metacritic, which assigns a weighted average rating out of 100 to reviews from mainstream publications, this release received an average score of 74 based on 13 reviews.

Mojo awarded the album 4 out of 5 and described it as "a great grown up pop record", opining that "(Wilson’s) solo work has seen him embracing dance, electronica and pop, and becoming all the better for it." Uncut awarded the album 8 out of 10, noting its "beautifully falsetto-iced vocal hooks" and "maverick meta pop". Classic Rock gave the album 9 out of 10, "Wilson has never before packed such a rollercoaster ride into a single album...Another triumph", and Rocks Magazine in Germany commented "Unpredictability remains Wilson’s credo" whilst rating the album 8 out of 10.

== Track listing ==
Initial announcements featured a slightly different track listing with "Man of the People" and "Personal Shopper" swapping places and "Anyone But Me" being the final track before the song was removed, and replaced with "Count of Unease". The song "Anyone But Me" was later released as a standalone single. The limited edition deluxe box set features an additional CD with 10 bonus tracks, including six unused songs from the album recording sessions.

All tracks are written by Steven Wilson and stylised in upper case.

The Future Bites track listing
No.	Title	Length
1.	"Unself"	1:05
2.	"Self"	2:55
3.	"King Ghost"	4:06
4.	"12 Things I Forgot"	4:42
5.	"Eminent Sleaze"	3:52
6.	"Man of the People"	4:41
7.	"Personal Shopper"	9:49
8.	"Follower"	4:39
9.	"Count of Unease"	6:08
Total length:		41:59

Limited edition deluxe box set – bonus content track listing
No.	Title	Length
1.	"Personal Shopper" (extended remix)	19:45
2.	"Unself" (long version)	2:46
3.	"Ha Bloody Ha"	5:07
4.	"Move Like a Fever"	4:45
5.	"King Ghost" (extended remix)	8:29
6.	"I Am Cliche"	2:55
7.	"Wave the White Flag"	4:33
8.	"Eminent Sleaze" (extended remix)	8:16
9.	"In Pieces"	4:04
10.	"Every Kingdom Falls"	4:07
Total length:		64:47

The B-Sides Collection track listing
No.	Title	Length
1.	"Eyewitness"	5:19
2.	"In Floral Green" (Lonely Robot cover)	5:33
3.	"Move Like a Fever" (alternate version)	6:14
4.	"King Ghost" (Tangerine Dream remix)	9:23
Total length:		26:29

Ultra deluxe edition (one-sided 7-inch single) track listing
No.	Title	Length
1.	"The Tastemaker"	2:17

== Personnel ==
Adapted from Discogs.

Performers

- Steven Wilson – vocals, guitars, keyboards, sampler, bass, percussion, programming
- David Kosten - programming, synthesizers, drone on "Count of Unease"
- Michael Spearman – drums, percussion
- Nick Beggs – bass guitar on "Personal Shopper", stick on "Eminent Sleaze"
- Adam Holzman – keyboards on "Eminent Sleaze" and "Follower"
- Richard Barbieri – synthesizers on "Self"
- Jason Cooper - cymbals and percussion on "King Ghost"
- Blaine Harrison, Jack Flanagan - backing vocals on "12 Things I Forgot"
- Elton John – spoken word on "Personal Shopper"
- Bobbie Gordon, Crystal Williams, Wendy Harriott, Fyfe Dangerfield, Rou Reynolds, Rotem Wilson – background vocals
- The London Session Orchestra on "Eminent Sleaze"

Additional personnel

- David Kosten – producer, programming, mixing, engineering
- Andrew Hobbs – album cover photography
- Simon Moore – art direction

== Charts ==
Chart performance for The Future Bites
Chart (2021)	Peak position
Australian Albums (ARIA)	47
Austrian Albums (Ö3 Austria)	2
Belgian Albums (Ultratop Flanders)	19
Belgian Albums (Ultratop Wallonia)	13
Dutch Albums (Album Top 100)	2
Finnish Albums (Suomen virallinen lista)	3
French Albums (SNEP)	41
German Albums (Offizielle Top 100)	3
Irish Albums (IRMA)	88
Italian Albums (FIMI)	11
Norwegian Albums (VG-lista)	27
Polish Albums (ZPAV)	8
Portuguese Albums (AFP)	5
Scottish Albums (Official Charts)	2
Spanish Albums (Promusicae)	32
Swedish Albums (Sverigetopplistan)	16
Swiss Albums (Schweizer Hitparade)	3
UK Albums (Official Charts)	4
US Billboard 200	193
US Top Rock Albums (Billboard)	37
