= Playground (Michel Petrucciani album) =

Studio album by Michel Petrucciani
- Released: 1991
- Genre: Jazz
- Length: 39:19
- Label: Blue Note
- Producers: Michel Petrucciani, Eric Kressmann

Michel Petrucciani chronology
Music (1989)	Playground (1991)	Promenade with Duke (1993)

Playground is a jazz album by the French musician Michel Petrucciani, released in 1991. It features his generally acoustic-based approach being transformed by the addition of synthesizers and electric bass guitar in the ensemble, as well as a more funk-rhythm driven approach to the music. It made the top 10 on Billboard's Jazz Albums chart.

Playground was produced by Petrucciani and Eric Kressmann. Omar Hakim and Adam Holzman contributed to the album.

== Critical reception ==
Professional ratings
Review scores
Source	Rating
AllMusic	4/5 stars

The Chicago Tribune wrote that Petrucciani's "artistry is great, but the slick, synthesized backgrounds (for which he is listed as arranger) make him work to get the music to skate over them without falling down." The Boston Herald opined that "erstwhile acoustic jazz powerhouse Michel Petrucciani delivers an array of fusion styles, ranging from breezy Crusaders-style workouts to the jagged funk made famous by the late Miles Davis."

The AllMusic review by Scott Yanow stated: "Actually, all 11 of Michel Petrucciani's originals are worth hearing and, despite the brief playing time of this CD, it is recommended."

== Track listing ==
All tracks composed by Michel Petrucciani, except as noted

1. "September Second" - 4:42
2. "Home" - 5:26
3. "P'Tit Louis" - 4:42
4. "Miles Davis' Licks" - 4:27
5. "Rachid" - 3:25
6. "Brazilian Suite #3" - 2:33
7. "Play School" - 3:03
8. "Contradictions" - 2:57
9. "Laws of Physics" (Adam Holzman) - 4:44
10. "Piango, Pay the Man" - 1:52
11. "Like That" - 1:37

== Personnel ==
- Michel Petrucciani – piano and synthesizers; arrangements
- Adam Holzman – synthesizer and synthesizer programming; co-arranger
- Anthony Jackson – bass guitar
- Omar Hakim – drums (all tracks except tracks 5 and 10)
- Steve Thornton – percussion
- Aldo Romano – drums (track 5 only)
