= Fireflies (Israeli TV series) =

Israeli television drama series

- גחליליות
- Genre: Drama
- Created by: Shachar Margen; Tawfik Abu-Wael
- Directed by: Tawfik Abu-Wael
- Starring: Dana Ivgy; Ninet Tayeb
- Music by: Rab Bagno
- Country of origin: Israel
- Original language: Hebrew
- No. of seasons: 1
- No. of episodes: 8

Production
- Producer: Yoav Hayon
- Cinematography: Yaron Scharf
- Editors: Nili Feller; Or Lee-Tal
- Running time: 42-45 minutes
- Production companies: Hot; Ananey Studios Paramount

Original release
- Network: HOT
- Release: June 3, 2025

Fireflies (Hebrew: גחליליות, translit. Gahliliot) is a 2025 Israeli mystery drama series created by Shachar Margen and Tawfik Abu-Wael. It is inspired by Margen's novel, Land of the Monasteries.

The series stars Dana Ivgy as Dikla, a pregnant police officer, and Ninet Tayeb as Mimi, a bomb disposal expert and her estranged childhood friend. Set against floods in a Dead Sea community, mysterious deaths begin to unfold without explanation.

It premiered on HOT in Israel on 3 June 2025 and was released internationally by Paramount+ on 21 November 2025. It is a co-production between Hot and Ananey Studios Paramount

== Plot summary ==
In a small Dead Sea community struck by devastating floods, the disaster dislodges long-buried land mines, creating immediate danger for residents and forcing local authorities to intervene.

At the center of the story is Dikla (Ivgy), a pregnant police officer tasked with keeping civilians away from the hazardous area. She is joined by Mimi (Tayeb), a bomb disposal expert and her estranged childhood friend. As the two women confront the physical dangers of the mines, they are also forced to navigate unresolved tensions from their past.

While the minefield provides the initial conflict, the series gradually introduces supernatural elements that unsettle the town. Strange phenomena begin to occur, intertwining with the characters’ personal struggles and secrets. As Dikla's investigation deepens, her renewed proximity to Mimi dredges up old traumas, blurring the line between external threats and inner turmoil.

== Cast ==
- Dana Ivgy as Dikla, a pregnant police officer
- Ninet Tayeb as Mimi, a bomb disposal expert
- Amir Khoury as Amir
- Makram Khoury as Hezi
- Sarit Vino-Elad as Sara
- Lia Elalouf as Yaeli
- Ben Sultan as Adam, Mimi's brother
- Ala Dakka as Tzahi
- Sigalit Fuchs
- Yussuf Abu-Warda

== Release ==
The series premiered in Israel on Next TV and Hot VOD on June 3 and then began airing on Hot 3 on June 5.

It was released internationally by Paramount+ on 21 November 2025.

== Reception ==
The series received critical praise upon its release in Israel.

Ynet praised the "excellent acting" and continued: "Fireflies is not an ordinary series in the current fast-paced and dense television landscape. She is contemplative, slow, does not overspeak and requires calibration to a different rhythm. Accordingly, the reward for your shekel of attention will come gradually. The thin line between reality and hallucination slowly pushes away the need for logic in the viewer and directs him to understand events as an allegory for the human psyche and relationships. There's something liberating the moment logic cracks, and a modern story becomes a mysterious legend."

Itay Ziv of Haaretz gave the series 3 out of 5 stars, praising the "Original and suspenseful" plot.

== See also ==
- Israeli television
- Culture of Israel
