= Randy McStine =

American musician (born 1988)

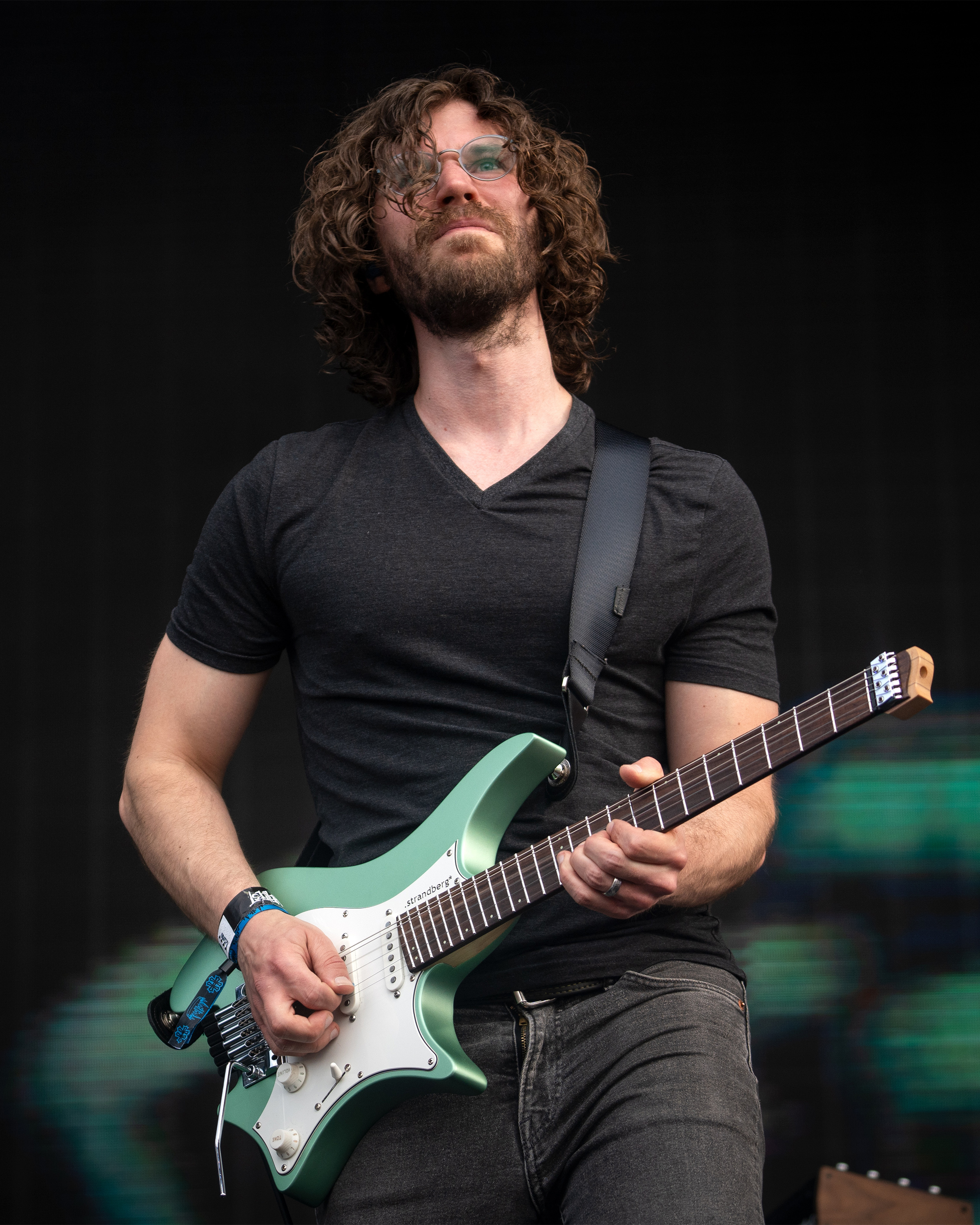
- McStine performing with Porcupine Tree in 2023

Background information
- Born: June 10, 1988 (age 38); New York City, New York, U.S.
- Genres: Progressive rock; alternative rock
- Instruments: Guitar; vocals
- Years active: 2005–present
- Label: Burning Shed
- Member of: The Fringe; In Continuum; McStine & Minnemann
- Formerly of: The Great Conniptions of Saint Ignatious; Red Spring; Lo-Fi Resistance
- Website: randymcstine.com

Randy McStine (born June 10, 1988) is an American guitarist, vocalist, and songwriter. In 2009, he formed the solo project Lo-Fi Resistance, which has released three albums, with various guest musicians. The first one, A Deep Breath, features Nick D'Virgilio of Spock's Beard and Doug Pinnick of King's X. The second album, Chalk Lines, includes Gavin Harrison and Colin Edwin of Porcupine Tree, John Giblin, and Dave Kerzner of Sound of Contact. The third, a digital-only release titled The Age of Entitlement, came out in 2014.

McStine plays guitar with In Continuum, a prog/symphonic rock group that includes Dave Kerzner (keyboards, vocals), Gabriel Agudo (vocals), Marco Minnemann (drums), and Matt Dorsey (bass). He has recorded two albums with Minneman as McStine & Minnemann, and he plays with the Fringe, a supergroup that includes Nick D'Virgilio (drums, vocals) and Jonas Reingold (bass, backing vocals).

In 2019, McStine toured as an opening act for the Pineapple Thief.

In 2022, it was announced that McStine and Nathan Navarro became touring guitarist and bassist, respectively, for a reformed Porcupine Tree, replacing frequent collaborator John Wesley. McStine continued his collaboration with Porcupine Tree's frontman, Steven Wilson, performing on the latter's 2025 album, The Overview, and joining his live band for the subsequent tour.

== Discography ==
=== Solo ===
- Guitarizm (2005)
- Official Bootleg Vol. I – Live at Black Bear Winery (2012)
- Anachronism (2016)
- Blank (2017)
- CDR EP 2019 (2019)
- Idle (2019)
- Rising (live, 2019)
- Live in Henniker, NH – First Night (2019)
- Live in Henniker, NH – Second Night (2019)
- Adopted Son – Live in Vancouver (2019)
- Live in Los Angeles (2023)
- Unintentional (2023)
- Mutual Hallucinations (2024)

=== Lo-Fi Resistance ===
- A Deep Breath (2010)
- Chalk Lines (2012)
- The Age of Entitlement (2014)
- L'Olympia (live, 2015)

=== The Great Conniptions of Saint Ignatious ===
- The Great Conniptions of Saint Ignatious (2012)

=== Red Spring ===
- Inside (EP, 2012)

=== The Fringe ===
- The Fringe (2016)

=== In Continuum ===
- Acceleration Theory (2019)
- Acceleration Theory Part Two: Annihilation (2019)

=== McStine & Minnemann ===
- McStine & Minnemann (2020)
- II (2020)
- Any Kind of Light (EP, 2021)
- III (2025)

=== Steven Wilson ===
- The Overview (2025)
- Requiem for a Village (2026)

=== Karmakanic ===
- Transmutation (2025)
