= 4½ =

4 1/2

EP by Steven Wilson
- Released: 22 January 2016
- Recorded: October 2012 – October 2015
- Genre: Progressive rock
- Length: 36:54
- Label: Kscope
- Producer: Steven Wilson

Steven Wilson chronology
Transience (2015)	4 1/2 (2016)	To the Bone (2017)

Singles from 4 1/2
- 1. "Happiness III" Released: 14 October 2016

Professional ratings
Aggregate scores
Source	Rating
Metacritic	71/100
Review scores
Source	Rating
AllMusic	3.5/5 stars
Classic Rock	3.5/5 stars
Ox-Fanzine	4/5 stars
Rock Hard	8.5/10
Sputnikmusic	4/5 stars
Uncut	3.5/5 stars

4 1/2 is an EP by British musician Steven Wilson. It was released on 22 January 2016. It collects songs that were written during the sessions for Wilson's previous two studio albums, The Raven That Refused to Sing (And Other Stories) and Hand. Cannot. Erase.. The closing track is a new version of "Don't Hate Me", originally recorded by Porcupine Tree on the album Stupid Dream, sung as a duet with Israeli singer Ninet Tayeb. The title 4 1/2 indicates the EP serves as an interim release between Wilson's fourth solo album Hand. Cannot. Erase. and his fifth full-length studio album To the Bone.

== Recording ==
- "My Book of Regrets" was written in late 2013 and finished in June 2015. Main recording took place in 28 June 2015 at a live concert in Montreal, with additional recording at No Man's Land.
- "Year of the Plague" was written and recorded during sessions of The Raven That Refused to Sing (And Other Stories) in 2012–2013.
- "Happiness III" was written in 2003 and recorded during the Hand. Cannot. Erase. sessions at Air Studio in September 2014.
- "Sunday Rain Sets In" was recorded during the Hand. Cannot. Erase. sessions at Air Studios, East West and Spin Studios in 2014.
- "Vermillioncore" was partly written in late 2013, finished in June 2015 and recorded in October 2015.
- "Don't Hate Me" was written in 1998 and originally released by Wilson's band, Porcupine Tree, on their 1999 album Stupid Dream. This version of the track was taken from a live concert in Europe in September 2015, with additional recording at No Man's Land.

== Track listing ==
All tracks are written by Steven Wilson.

No.	Title	Length
1.	"My Book of Regrets"	9:35
2.	"Year of the Plague" (instrumental)	4:15
3.	"Happiness III"	4:31
4.	"Sunday Rain Sets In" (instrumental)	3:50
5.	"Vermillioncore" (instrumental)	5:09
6.	"Don't Hate Me"	9:34
Total length:		36:54

== Personnel ==
- Steven Wilson – lead vocals, guitars, autoharp, Mellotron, piano, percussion, virtual instruments

=== Guitarists ===
- Dave Kilminster (tracks 1 and 6)
- Guthrie Govan (track 3)

=== Drummers ===
- Craig Blundell (tracks 1, 5, and 6)
- Marco Minnemann (track 3)
- Chad Wackerman (track 4)

=== Additional personnel ===
- Nick Beggs – bass guitar, Chapman Stick, backing vocals
- Adam Holzman – Wurlitzer, Hammond organ, Minimoog, Rhodes piano
- Theo Travis – reed (tracks 4 and 6)
- Ninet Tayeb – co-vocals (track 6)

== Charts ==
Chart (2016)	Peak position
Austrian Albums (Ö3 Austria)	17
Belgian Albums (Ultratop Flanders)	33
Belgian Albums (Ultratop Wallonia)	47
Canadian Albums (Billboard)	38
Dutch Albums (MegaCharts)	9
Finnish Albums (Suomen virallinen lista)	13
French Albums (SNEP)	55
German Albums (Offizielle Top 100)	7
Italian Albums (FIMI)	22
Norwegian Albums (VG-lista)	20
Polish Albums (ZPAV)	49
Swedish Albums (Sverigetopplistan)	32
Swiss Albums (Schweizer Hitparade)	14
UK Albums (Official Charts)	21
US Billboard 200	114
