= Katherine Priddy =

British folk singer-songwriter (born 1994)

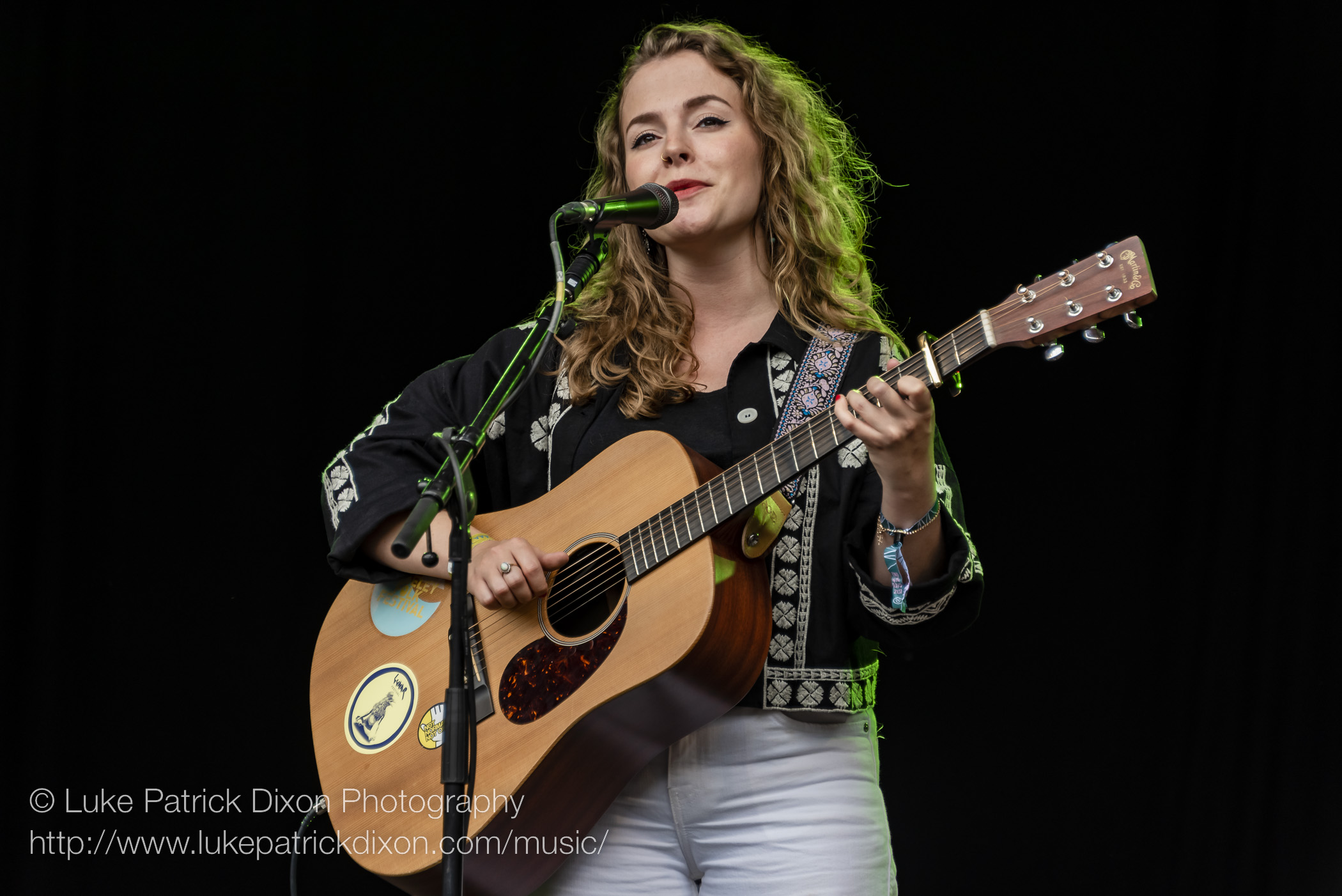
- Priddy performing at End of the Road Festival in 2022
- Born: Katherine Priddy; 9 November 1994 (age 31); Birmingham, England
- Other name: Priddy
- Occupations: Singer; songwriter
- Years active: 2010–present
- Musical career
- Genres: Folk; pop; rock
- Instruments: Vocals; guitar; synthesiser
- Label: Cooking Vinyl
- Website: katherinepriddy.co.uk

Katherine Priddy is an English folk singer and songwriter from Birmingham, England. She is currently signed to Cooking Vinyl.

== Early life and education ==
Priddy was born in Birmingham, England, on 9 November 1994. She grew up in Alvechurch, and attended South Bromsgrove High School. She developed an interest in music at a young age, alongside a passion for literature. This dual interest led her to pursue a degree in literature at the University of Sussex, where she further honed her skills in storytelling and narrative construction. These elements would later become central to her songwriting approach.

== Career ==
Priddy's music career began to gain traction with the release of her album The Eternal Rocks Beneath in 2021. The album achieved commercial success, reaching number one on the Official UK Folk Albums Chart on 3 August 2021. This initial success established her as a noteworthy presence in the UK folk scene. The Guardian has described her as a "folk prodigy". She appeared on the List of UK Independent Album Breakers Chart number ones of the 2020s.

During the pandemic lockdown, Priddy recorded a number of video duets with other musicians from the UK folk scene, including David Delarre, Ciaran Algar and George Boomsma. Notably, she recorded three songs by Nick Drake with fellow Midlands musician Jon Wilks, Jon Nice and Lukas Drinkwater, forming the short-lived quartet Slow Jane. She subsequently went on to be included on the Endless Coloured Ways compilation album featuring artists covering Nick Drake. She also recorded the vocals for the traditional song "Mary Ashford's Tragedy" with Jon Wilks.

Priddy has also collaborated and toured with the singer-songwriter John Smith, releasing the single "Talk to Me of Mendocino" together in 2022.

Her live performances have included notable appearances such as the BBC Proms and the Glastonbury Festival Acoustic Stage, as well as on the BBC's live coverage of the festival. Richard Thompson in Mojo magazine described Priddy as "the best thing I've heard all year".

In October 2023, Priddy announced her second studio album, introducing "First House on the Left" as the lead single. The album, titled The Pendulum Swing, was released in February 2024. Produced by Simon Weaver and released under Cooking Vinyl, it was met with positive critical reception from publications such as The Guardian and The Irish Times.

In May 2024, Priddy appeared on Later... with Jools Holland alongside Paul Weller, Mark Knopfler, Nadine Shah, Bob Vylan and Rachel Chinouriri. She performed her song "A Boat on the River" from her latest album, The Pendulum Swing.

In November 2024, Priddy announced a two track collaboration with Poet Laureate Simon Armitage, featuring two specially commissioned winter-themed poems that Priddy set to music. The first single, "Close Season", was released on 29 November, produced by Rob Ellis and recorded at Wool Hall.

In 2025, she supported Suzanne Vega on her UK tour.

Priddy sings on the track “Murmurations” on Steven Wilson’s 2026 album, Requiem for a Village.

== Personal life ==
Priddy was born in Birmingham. She studied literature at the University of Sussex.

== Discography ==
Priddy has done soundtrack work for BBC's Uncanny and Netflix's Unchosen.

=== Albums and EPs ===
- The Eternal Rocks Beneath (2021)
- The Pendulum Swing (2024)
- These Frightening Machines (2026)

=== EPs ===
- Wolf (2018)

=== Singles ===
- "Letters from a Travelling Man" (2019)
- "Still Winter, Still Waiting" (2020)
- "True Love Will Find You in the End" (2021)
- "Indigo" (2021)
- "Eurydice" (2021)
- "Icarus" (2021)
- "I Think They're Leaving Me Behind" (2023)
- "First House on the Left" (2023)
- "Does She Hold You Like I Did" (2023)
- "Anyway, Always" (2024)

=== With Slow Jane ===
- "Northern Sky" (2020)
- "Fly" (2021)

=== With other artists ===
- "Mary Ashford's Tragedy" (with Jon Wilks, 2020)
- "Talk to Me of Mendocino" (with John Smith, 2022)
- "Migrations" (with Richard Walters, 2024)
- "Close Season" (with Simon Armitage, 2024)
- "Murmurations" (with Steven Wilson, 2026)
