= The Overview (album) =

Studio album by Steven Wilson
- Released: 14 March 2025
- Recorded: December 2023 – August 2024
- Studio: Home studio (North London)
- Genres: Progressive rock; space rock; psychedelic rock
- Length: 41:44
- Label: Fiction
- Producer: Steven Wilson

Steven Wilson chronology
The Harmony Codex (2023)	The Overview (2025)	Requiem for a Village (2026)

The Overview (stylised TH5 OV5RV95W) is the eighth studio album by English progressive rock musician Steven Wilson, released on 14 March 2025 via Fiction Records. Featuring only two 20-minute tracks, it returned to a progressive rock sound after Wilson had previously moved into more electronic territory with the two preceding releases.

== Background ==
The record is a concept album about the overview effect, a cognitive shift caused by viewing the Earth from space. This concept was utilized, according to Wilson, as a starting point for the sound of the record, which recalls the sound of such seminal prog artists as Pink Floyd, Tangerine Dream, and Vangelis, though brought into "a modern context". Wilson had stated that the album was going to be considerably more progressive rock influenced than much of his recent work, stating that he felt the concept geared itself well to the genre.

On 25 February 2025, the record premiered at the BFI IMAX alongside a commissioned film by Miles Skarin. Alongside the main album, a deluxe edition titled The Alterview, featuring an additional hour of music, was released. A tour also started in promotion of the record on 1 May 2025, Wilson's first headlining solo tour in over seven years. The tour was documented with the live album Impossible Tightrope: Live In Madrid.

== Critical reception ==
Professional ratings
Aggregate scores
Source	Rating
Metacritic	82/100
Review scores
Source	Rating
AllMusic	4/5 stars
Clash	8/10
Classic Rock	4.5/5 stars
Mojo	4/5 stars
Sputnikmusic	2.9/5

The Overview received positive reviews from critics. At Metacritic, which assigns a normalized rating out of 100 to reviews from mainstream critics, the album received an average score of 82 based on eight reviews, indicating "universal acclaim".

For Mojo, Tom Doyle gave the album 4/4 stars, writing: "Wilson has to be admired for boldly venturing into the prog regions where his contemporaries fear to go. By doubling down on The Overview, his status as the progfather is secure, alongside his alignment with those mixing-desk visionaries he so admired in his youth. While some of its more indulgent elements may not be to all tastes, his scale of ambition and dazzling audacity should be applauded."

Ed Power in The Irish Times awarded 4/5 stars, writing that the album "feels like one of the better Christopher Nolan films translated to music: it’s vaulted, self-serious and a bit silly. But the sheer ambition has its own kind of beauty; you’ll be impressed by Wilson’s determination to keep a straight face amid the sonic absurdity. In the best sense, it is out of this world, a pirouetting profusion of prog pyrotechnics that will charm students of the form like a saucerful of secrets."

In The Guardian, Alexis Petridis wrote: "An 18-minute-long suite that throws in every influence imaginable from Warp Records-style techno to Floyd melancholy to gleefully OTT prog-metal and somehow, astonishingly, works: unexpected but triumphant."

Giving the album 4.5/5 stars, Chris Roberts wrote in Louder: "The Overview is not so much a return to form (Wilson hasn’t been off it) as a return to full-fat, unskimmed prog from the man whose work with Porcupine Tree gave the genre a good name even before it earned reappraisals in more recent years."

It was ranked by Goldmine as one of the 11 top prog albums of 2025.

== Track listing ==
All music is composed by Steven Wilson.

The Overview track listing
No.	Title	Lyrics	Length
1.	"Objects Outlive Us": "No Monkey's Paw"; "The Buddha of the Modern Age"; "Objects: Meanwhile"; "The Cicerones"; "Ark"; "Cosmic Sons of Toil"; "No Ghost on the Moor"; "Heat Death of the Universe"	Wilson; Andy Partridge	23:17
2.	"The Overview": "Perspective"; "A Beautiful Infinity I"; "Borrowed Atoms"; "A Beautiful Infinity II"; "Infinity Measured in Moments"; "Permanence"	Wilson	18:27
Total length:			41:44

All music is composed by Steven Wilson.

The Alterview (deluxe edition disc 2) track listing
No.	Title	Lyrics	Length
1.	"Orchestral Objects"	Wilson; Andy Partridge	23:19
2.	"Beautiful Infinity" (early version)		4:48
3.	"Unused Objects"		11:42
4.	"No Ghost on the Moor" (alternate version)		7:11
5.	"Permanence" (extended version)		13:27
Total length:			60:26

=== Digital edition ===
The digital edition is in two parts: the first comprises "Objects Outlive Us" and "The Overview" as single audio tracks; the second comprises "Objects Outlive Us" and "The Overview" split into their component tracks.

== Personnel ==
=== "Objects Outlive Us" ===
- Steven Wilson – vocals, guitar, bass, keyboards, percussion, piano, pump organ, production, mixing, engineering
- Adam Holzman – Hammond organ, Mellotron, piano, Rhodes, synthesizer
- Randy McStine – background vocals, guitar, sound effects, vocals
- Theo Travis – flute, saxophone
- Russell Holzman – drums
- Willow Beggs – vocals

=== "The Overview" ===
- Steven Wilson – vocals, guitar, bass, drum programming, keyboards, percussion, piano, pump organ, production, mixing, engineering
- Adam Holzman – background vocals, piano, Rhodes, synthesizer
- Randy McStine – background vocals, guitar, keyboards, sound effects, ukulele, vocals
- Niko Tsonev – guitar
- Craig Blundell – drums
- Theo Travis – saxophone
- Rotem Wilson – spoken word

== Charts ==
Chart performance for The Overview
Chart (2025)	Peak position
Australian Albums (ARIA)	53
Austrian Albums (Ö3 Austria)	3
Belgian Albums (Ultratop Flanders)	11
Belgian Albums (Ultratop Wallonia)	6
Dutch Albums (Album Top 100)	3
Finnish Albums (Suomen virallinen lista)	12
French Albums (SNEP)	21
German Albums (Offizielle Top 100)	1
Irish Independent Albums (IRMA)	15
Italian Albums (FIMI)	9
Polish Albums (ZPAV)	9
Scottish Albums (Official Charts)	1
Spanish Albums (PROMUSICAE)	10
Swedish Albums (Sverigetopplistan)	47
Swiss Albums (Schweizer Hitparade)	3
UK Albums (Official Charts)	3
UK Independent Albums (Official Charts)	1
UK Rock & Metal Albums (Official Charts)	1
US Billboard 200	139
US Independent Albums (Billboard)	23
US Top Rock & Alternative Albums (Billboard)	29
