= David Kollar =

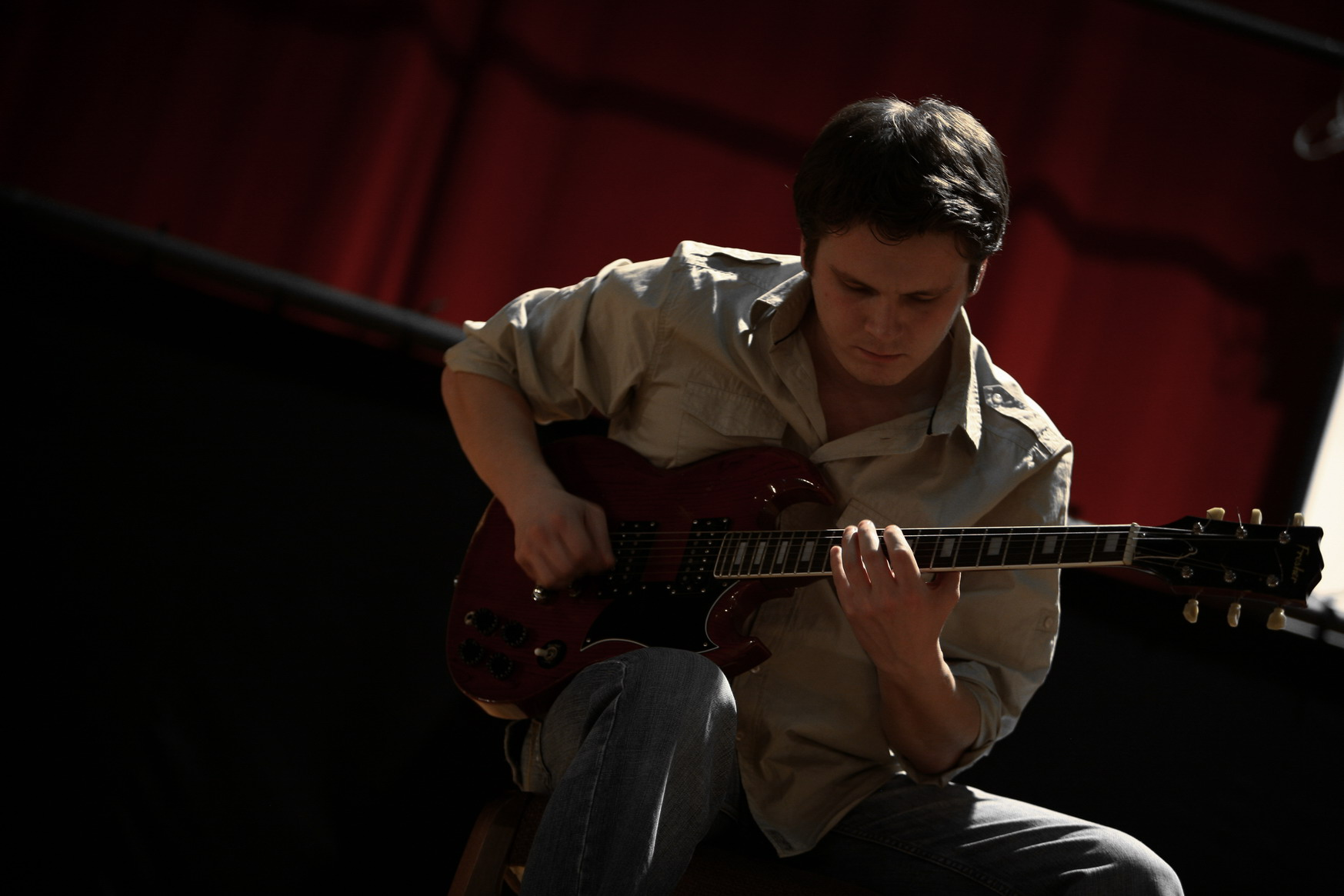
- David Kollar

Background information
- Born: 25 October 1983 (age 43); Prešov, Czechoslovakia
- Genres: Jazz, experimental music
- Occupations: Musician, composer
- Instrument: Guitar
- Years active: 2005–present
- Label: Mystery Stable

David Kollar (born 25 October 1983) is a Slovak experimental guitarist and composer. He was born in Prešov into a musical family. He began his career at the end of the nineties in various amateur groups. He studied with guitarist Andrej Šeban. His first album called Free Your Minds was released in 2005. He is also film and stage music composer. In 2014 he did a tour with American drummer Pat Mastelotto and Italian trumpeter Paolo Raineri. Kollar appears on the 2017 Steven Wilson album To the Bone, playing on two tracks, "Song of I" and "Detonation".
