= Adam Holzman (keyboardist) =

American jazz keyboardist (born 1958)

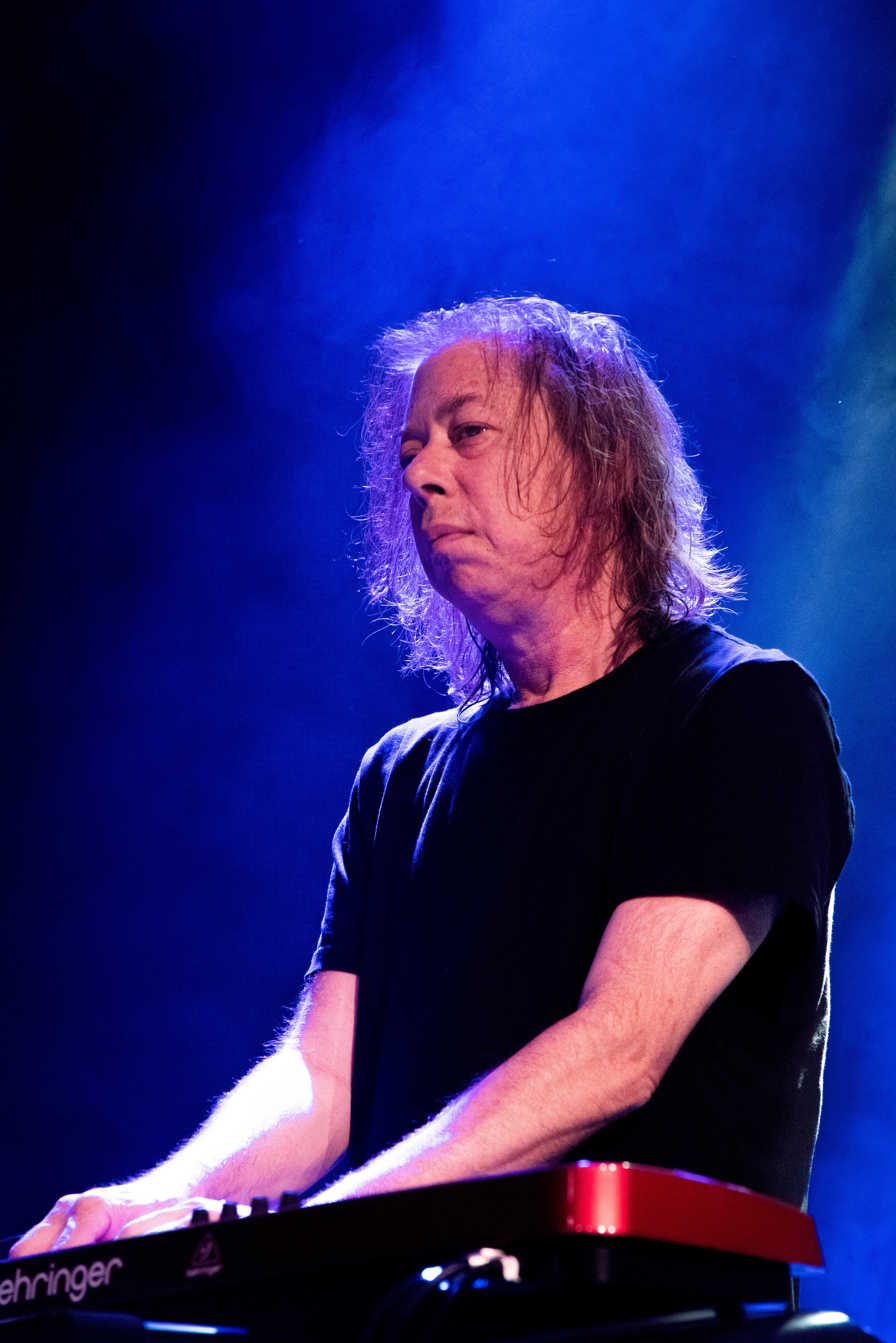
- Adam Holzman at the Zelt Musik Festival 2018

Background information
- Born: February 15, 1958 (age 68); New York City, New York, U.S.
- Origin: Los Angeles, California, U.S
- Genres: Jazz; jazz fusion; progressive rock
- Occupations: Musician, music producer
- Instrument: Keyboards
- Labels: Manhattan Records, Lipstick, Escapade, Big Fun Productions, AA, Nagel-Heyer, Composers Concordance Records, Kscope
- Member of: Steven Wilson band
- Formerly of: Miles Davis band
- Website: http://adamholzman.com/

Adam Holzman (born February 15, 1958) is an American jazz fusion and rock keyboardist best known for his work with Miles Davis and Steven Wilson. He is the son of Elektra Records' founder Jac Holzman. Holzman has also worked as a music producer, arranger and musical director.

== Biography ==
In musical regards, Adam Holzman was mainly influenced by The Doors, Leon Russell and Dr. John, and then by progressive rock bands Emerson, Lake & Palmer and Yes as well as jazz fusion artists Chick Corea of Return to Forever, Mahavishnu Orchestra, and Billy Cobham. In the late 1970s, Holzman founded Los Angeles-based jazz-rock band, The Fents with guitarist Ted Hall and bassist Doug Hodges (with whom he had also collaborated on Ray Manzarek's solo studio album Carmina Burana). In 1985, he was hired by Miles Davis to play keyboards on the trumpeter's Tutu album, and stayed with him for four years, eventually becoming his musical director. In the early 1990s, he founded the band Mona Lisa Overdrive, which changed its name to Brave New World due to copyright issues.

Holzman has performed as a sideman with Bob Belden, Tom Browne, Wayne Escoffery, Charles Fambrough, Anton Fig, Robben Ford, Jane Getter, Randy Hall, Ray Manzarek (The Doors), Wayne Shorter (Weather Report), Jason Miles, Marcus Miller, Michel Petrucciani, Wallace Roney, Steps Ahead, Grover Washington Jr., Lenny White and Ray Wilson. Many of these performers he has also produced, arranged, and composed for. Since 2011 Adam has recorded and toured extensively with Steven Wilson, and is currently a member of his backing band.

Holzman, Nick Beggs and Craig Blundell formed a supergroup, Trifecta, with their debut album, Fragments, released in 2021. Their next album, The New Normal, was released on April 12, 2024.

== Discography ==
=== As leader/co-leader ===
- 1992 In a Loud Way (Manhattan)
- 1994 Overdrive (Lipstick)
- 1995 Manifesto (Lipstick)
- 1997 The Big Picture - credited as Adam Holzman & Brave New World (Escapade)
- 2001 Rebellion - credited as Adam Holzman & Brave New World (Big Fun Productions)
- 2003 Live 1994 (AA)
- 2004 Neon Beef Thermometer: Live in New York - credited as Adam Holzman & Brave New World (Big Fun Productions)
- 2005 Jazz Rocket Science - credited as Adam Holzman & Brave New World (Nagel-Heyer)
- 2010 Spork - credited as Adam Holzman & Brave New World (Big Fun Productions)
- 2012 H3 (Composers Concordance Records)
- 2013 Parallel Universe: Solo Electronic Explorations (Composers Concordance Records)
- 2015 The Deform Variations
- 2018 Truth Decay (Big Fun Productions)
- 2021 The Last Gig - credited as Adam Holzman & Brave New World
- 2021 Fragments - as Trifecta (Kscope)
- 2024 The New Normal - as Trifecta
- 2025 Zombie Apocalypse (Big Fun Productions)

=== As sideman ===
With Bob Belden

- 1991 Straight to My Heart: The Music of Sting
- 1994 When the Doves Cry: The Music of Prince
- 1996 Shades of Blue

With Miles Davis

- 1986 Tutu
- 1987 Music from Siesta, Miles Davis/Marcus Miller
- 1996 Live Around the World
- 1998 Live in France
- 2002 The Complete Miles Davis at Montreux
- 2005 Munich Concert
- 2005 The Cellar Door Sessions 1970
- 2006 The Prince of Darkness: Live in Europe
- 2009 That's What Happened: Live in Germany, 1987
- 2016 Live in San Juan '89

With Jane Getter

- 1998 Jane
- 2005 See Jane Run
- 2012 Three
- 2015 ON
- 2021 Anomalia
- 2026 Transmorgify

With Michel Petrucciani

- 1989 Music
- 1991 Live
- 1991 Playground

With Wallace Roney

- No Room for Argument (Stretch, 2000)
- Prototype (HighNote, 2004)
- Mystikal (HighNote, 2005)

With Grover Washington

- 1996 Soulful Strut
- 1997 Breath of Heaven: A Holiday Collection
- 2004 Trios
- 2010 Grover Live

With Steven Wilson

- 2012 Catalogue / Preserve / Amass
- 2012 Get All You Deserve
- 2013 Drive Home
- 2013 The Raven that Refused to Sing (And Other Stories)
- 2015 Hand. Cannot. Erase.
- 2015 Transience
- 2016 4½
- 2017 To the Bone
- 2018 Home Invasion: In Concert at the Royal Albert Hall
- 2021 The Future Bites
- 2023 The Harmony Codex
- 2025 The Overview

With others

- 1983 Carmina Burana, Ray Manzarek
- 1988 Love You Like a Stranger, Randy Hall
- 1994 Vibe, Steps Ahead
- 1995 Keeper of the Spirit, Charles Fambrough
- 1995 Present Tense, Lenny White
- 1998 Endless Miles, Various
- 1998 Getting Even, Dennis Chambers
- 1999 R 'N' Browne, Tom Browne
- 2002 Figments, Anton Fig
- 2003 Change, Ray Wilson
- 2005 Miles to Miles: In the Spirit of Miles Davis, Jason Miles
- 2012 The Only Son of One, Wayne Escoffery
- 2016 2112 40th Anniversary, Rush
