= Joseph E-Shine Mizrachi =

- Also known as: E-Shine
- Born: Yoseph Mizrachi; December 6, 1989 (age 36)
- Origin: Tel Aviv, Israel
- Genres: Alternative rock, Indie
- Occupations: Multi-Instrumentalist, Music Producer, Songwriter, Composer, Singer
- Instruments: guitar, drums, bass
- Years active: 2003–present

Joseph "Yossi" Mizrachi (Hebrew: יוסי מזרחי), better known by his stage name Joseph E-Shine, is an Israeli multi-instrumentalist and music producer. E-Shine is considered to be one of Israel's busiest artists in the past few years, and was labeled as a "wonder boy" from an early stage. At under the age of 30, he already has 5 Gold Records, dozens of successful productions, and high-profile international performances and collaborations. He was married to the actress-singer, Ninet Tayeb.

== Early stages ==
Yoseph Mizrachi was born on December 6, 1989, in Tel Aviv, Israel, to a family of Sephardic Jewish descent. From an early age he was inspired by his father, a drummer for several leading musical groups, to pursue a career in music. E-Shine started as a drummer at the age of five, and was already an experienced bassist and an electric guitarist at 15, when he routinely performed with various underground artists as a session musician.

At 17, he was hired as a guitarist by Meir Banai. Joseph played on Banai's album, "Sh'ma Koli" (Hebrew for "Hear My Voice") – winning him a Gold Record. Banai then decided to co-produce with E-Shine an entire tour of acoustic shows, which ran for two years. During that time, E-Shine also wrote and co-produced an album for "Funk’n’stein" band, in which he played bass and sang. E-Shine toured with “Funk’n’stein” all over Israel, Germany, England, and Poland (where the band was selected to perform in the "4 Culture Dialog" Festival). Between touring, producing, recording, and playing, E-Shine also worked as a guitar teacher. These multiple projects enabled him to pursue a higher musical education after being admitted to the Los Angeles College of Music in Pasadena, which he attended in 2009–2010.

== The rise of Acollective ==
E-Shine's studies forced him to pause a then-new project called "Acollective" (in Hebrew: הקולקטיב), which was renewed only later, in 2010. "Acollective" is a seven-member multi-instrumentalists' band, which started as a classic "Basement Band" of seven childhood friends from Tel Aviv. Later, they brought the international Indie scene to Israel. The band's first steps towards domestic and international recognition started with E-Shine's return, which was followed by a tour in London in April 2010.

There, the band was discovered by the British independent publicity firm, "Hall Or Nothing", and was sent to a one-week recording session in the Manic Street Preachers studios in Wales to record an EP. Four more months of performances and intense writing sessions in the U.K, and the band was ready to go back to Israel to record its debut album – Onwards, produced by Chris Shaw. Shaw, who has worked with artists such as Bob Dylan, Sheryl Crow, Weezer, and Run-D.M.C, was so impressed by Acollective's work, that he decided to travel to Israel for a two-week recording session. Onwards was finally released in March 2011.

== Joining Hadag Nahash and touring with Onwards ==
During the recording of Onwards, E-shine was asked to join the successful Israeli band "Hadag Nahash" (Hebrew for "the Snake-Fish") as their guitarist. He continued to perform as a session musician with dozens of Israeli artists and started the two-year Onwards tour with Acollective.

In 2012, the Onwards tour took E-Shine and Acollective to the U.S. where they performed in various venues throughout the Midwest, Atlanta, and Nashville. The tour finished with a performance at the SXSW Festival in Austin, Texas. In 2013, the tour crossed Europe. E-Shine and Acollective performed as headliners at the United Islands Festival in Prague, where they shared the stage with Aloe Blacc. In addition, they were featured at the Y Not Festival in Pikehall, U.K, and were the first Israeli band to perform at the Glastonbury Festival. Alongside his work with Acollective during those years, E-Shine continued to base his status as a leading musician within Hadag Nahash. Between 2011 and 2014, he performed with the band in the U.S. and Germany, as part of their "6" tour, named after their album. Between the multiple performances, E-Shine recorded their next album, "Z'man Lehitorer" (Hebrew for "Time to Wake Up"), which was also certified Gold.

== Pangea European tour ==
While touring "6" with Hadag Nahash, E-Shine managed to release Acollective's second album, Pangea, which came out in August 2014 and was distributed by the British Alcopop! Records. In addition to playing and co-producing the album, E-Shine also wrote and composed one of its songs called "I Can't". Pangea turned out to be a great success and was received praise from music blogs all over the world, including UNCUT, NME, DIY, Clash, and many more. Following its phenomenal outbreak, E-Shine and Acollective embarked on a sold-out tour, where they appeared among others, the Fusion Festival in Germany, the U.K, Lithuania, Latvia, the prestigious Pentaport Rock Festival in South Korea, and Tel Aviv.

In Israel, the band also started a tour with Shlomi Shaban (שלומי שבן), which took them through 2013 and 2014. E-Shine worked as a multi-instrumentalist in Shaban's band. Following the tour, the band and E-Shine recorded Shaban's then-new album in 2014, Targil Behitorerut (Hebrew for "Awakening exercise"), which was certified Gold.

Acollective's success in 2014 led to two additional tours in 2015. The winter tour brought E-Shine to the United Islands Festival in Prague once again. The summer tour included Glastonbury, The Great Escape Festival in Brighton, U.K, the London Calling (festival), and the Festival Mundial in the Netherlands, the Primavera Sound Festival in Spain, the 2000 Trees Festival in the U.K, the Pohoda (music festival) in Slovakia, the Serengeti Festival, Lott-Festival, Trebur Festival, Taubertal Festival and Open Flair Festival in Germany, the Poolbar Festival in Austria.

== New album with Hadag Nahash ==
E-Shine's success continued in 2015 with Hadag Nahash as well, during the recording of a live album of the band together with the Israeli Opera Philharmonic, which was released in March of that year. Late 2015 also marked the end of an era for E-Shine. After performing with Acollective as the main act for the Israeli Piano Festival and a successful 10-day tour in India, in which they played in the known NH7 Weekender Festival, E-Shine announced he was leaving the band. After leaving Acollective, E-Shine continued to collaborate with Hadag Nahash and was credited for strings arrangements and guitars for the band's ninth album, Shutafim Ba'am (Hebrew for "Partners in the Nation").

== Producing and session work ==
During the years of performing and recording with Acollective, Hadag Nahash, and many others, E-Shine managed to create a successful production career as well.

In 2012, he produced Tails of a Drunken Man for LFNT, a band led by Ran Nir, bassist for the Asaf Avidan & the Mojos. During that time, E-Shine also produced two singles for the Israeli-born virtuoso violinist & singer-songwriter, Michael Greilsammer (in Hebrew מיכאל גריילסאמר). He co-produced three singles for Israeli star Eric Berman (in Hebrew אריק ברמן), and produced the debut single leading to a full LP of the Israeli "The Voice" participant, Noa Golan-Barel, Lo Nirdemet (Hebrew for "Can't Fall Asleep").

In 2013 E-Shine's co-produced Ninet Tayeb's fourth album, All the Animals Knew. Ninet later married E-Shine.

In 2014, E-Shine produced a song named Lose it, for Ester Rada. During this year, E-Shine also worked as a guitarist and a bassist for Israeli singer Idan Chaviv's album Le'abed Ineyan Bazeman (Hebrew for "Lose Interest in Time"), which was certified Gold. In addition, he performed as a contra-bassist for Karolina's acoustic tour (a well-known Israeli soul singer), and produced an entire album for Israeli singer Tamar Giladi, name "Haderech Haba'ita (Hebrew for "The Way Home").

E-Shine's list of production credits for 2015 is even greater. During this year, he did additional production on an EP for Israeli band Lola Marsh and produced an album called Go Go Go for the Israeli band Combine. He also produced an album for Israeli singer-actress Liat Achiron named Pisot (Hebrew for "Pieces"), as well as producing the fourth studio album of the Israeli singer Abigail Rose, on which he also functioned as a multi-instrumentalist.

E-Shine also performed with Ninet during her shows through Israel, the U.S. and Europe. Ninet's single, Paper Parachute, from her upcoming fifth album – which is produced by E-Shine as well – was launched during 2015's CMJ. After a tour of Europe, they embarked on a U.S. promo tour in 2016, ending at the SXSW Festival.

== "Sussie's Art Bay" art complex ==
E-Shine has also founded Sussie's Art Bay, a collaborative art complex situated in downtown Tel Aviv. Founded in 2014 with twenty private studio spaces and a shared exhibition space, it has brought together a multi-dimensional group of artists that focus on producing content for events and exhibitions.

One of their flagship projects was the launch event of Africa Sheli (Hebrew for "My Africa"), an album by Gilad Kahana, which E-Shine co-produced.

== Achievements ==
- Meir Banai, Sh'ma Koli, Gold Record.
- Hadag Nahash, 6, Gold Record.
- Hadag Nahash, Z'man Lehitorer, Gold Record.
- Shlomi Shaban, Targil Behitorerut, Gold Record.
- Idan Chaviv, Le'abed Ineyan Bazeman, Gold Record.
- Produced and recorded dozens of albums.
