= Transience (Steven Wilson album) =

Compilation album by Steven Wilson
- Released: 11 September 2015
- Recorded: 2003–2015
- Genre: Progressive rock
- Length: 62:23
- Label: Kscope
- Producer: Steven Wilson

Steven Wilson chronology
Hand. Cannot. Erase. (2015)	Transience (2015)	4½ (2016)

Professional ratings
Review scores
Source	Rating
AllMusic	3.5/5 stars

Transience is a compilation album released in 2015 by British musician and record producer Steven Wilson. It compiles thirteen songs originally recorded between 2003 and 2015. The album was released as a CD and a limited-edition double LP.

== Track listing ==
No.	Title	Original album	Length
1.	"Transience" (single version)	Hand. Cannot. Erase.	3:10
2.	"Harmony Korine"	Insurgentes	5:07
3.	"Postcard"	Grace for Drowning	4:27
4.	"Significant Other"	Insurgentes	4:31
5.	"Insurgentes"	Insurgentes	3:54
6.	"The Pin Drop"	The Raven That Refused to Sing (And Other Stories)	5:01
7.	"Happy Returns" (edit)	Hand. Cannot. Erase.	5:11
8.	"Deform to Form a Star" (edit)	Grace for Drowning	5:53
9.	"Happiness III" (2016 CD issue only)	4½	4:31
10.	"Thank You" (Alanis Morissette cover)	Cover Version	4:39
11.	"Index"	Grace for Drowning	4:47
12.	"Hand. Cannot. Erase."	Hand. Cannot. Erase.	4:13
13.	"Lazarus" (2015 re-recording) (Porcupine Tree cover)	New recording	3:57
14.	"Drive Home"	The Raven That Refused to Sing (And Other Stories)	7:33

== Charts ==
Chart performance for Transience
Chart (2015)	Peak position
Belgian Albums (Ultratop Wallonia)	100
Dutch Albums (Album Top 100)	83
French Albums (SNEP)	123
German Albums (Offizielle Top 100)	52
Swiss Albums (Schweizer Hitparade)	60
UK Albums (OCC)	59
