= Ninet Tayeb =

Israeli singer

Ninet Tayeb נינט טייב
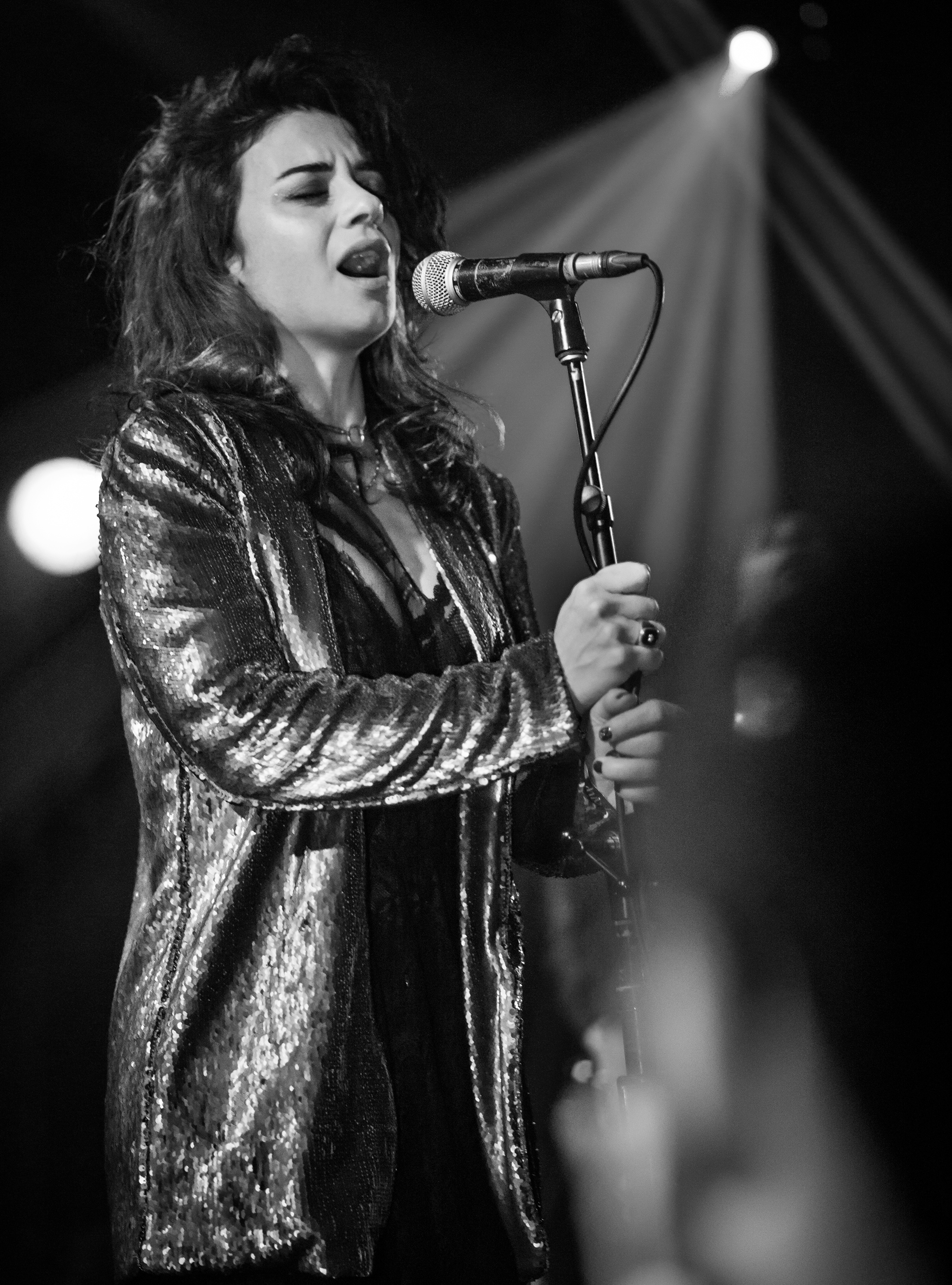
- Ninet in 2017

Background information
- Born: Nati Ninet Tayeb; 21 October 1983 (age 43); Kiryat Gat, Israel
- Occupations: Singer-songwriter; composer; DJ; actress; model; television presenter
- Instruments: Vocals; guitar; piano; drums
- Years active: 2003–present
- Label: Helicon
- Website: ninetayeb.com

Ninet Nati Tayeb (Hebrew: נינט טייב; born 21 October 1983), professionally known as Ninet, is an Israeli singer-songwriter, actress, model and radio broadcaster. She rose to prominence when she won the first season of reality TV show Kokhav Nolad ("A Star is Born") in 2003.

Her debut album, Barefoot (2006) went platinum within twenty-four hours in Israel and produced five no. 1 hit singles. She has released five subsequent albums: Communicative (2009), Sympathetic Nervous System (2012), All the Animals Knew (2013), Paper Parachute (2017) and I Got Up to Dance (2023).

As an actress she has starred in HaShir Shelanu (2004-2005), Zaguri Imperia (2014) and When Heroes Fly (2018), which was broadcast internationally by Netflix. She also stars in Paramount+ original mystery series, Fireflies (2025).

She is regarded as one of the most prominent figures in the Israeli entertainment industry. She has been referred to as a "Jewish Janis Joplin" by Haaretz.

== Early life ==
Tayeb was born and raised in Kiryat Gat, Israel, to Maghrebi Jewish parents. Her father, Yosef Tayeb, was born in Tunisia, and her mother, Marcelle (née Malka), was born in Morocco. Both of her parents separately immigrated to Israel. She is the third of five siblings and was nicknamed "Nina" at a very young age by her family and friends. Ninet served as a soldier in the Combat Engineering Corps of the Israel Defense Forces.

Tayeb was brought up around music with performances in small events as a teenager. She appeared in the singing group of her school, Ort Rogozin At she age of 15, she won a local song contest in her home town with a rendition of "Hero" by Mariah Carey. She was influenced by artists such as Nirvana, Pearl Jam, and Oasis.

== Career ==
Tayeb has released four successful albums in Israel (one of them in English), and has twice won Israel's Favorite Act at the MTV Europe Music Awards. She has worked with producer Mike Crossey (who produced her third album, Sympathetic Nervous System), and artists such as Steven Wilson, Gary Lucas, Cyndi Lauper, The Jesus and Mary Chain, and The Dead Daisies.

In addition to her musical career, Tayeb has enjoyed a successful acting career, performing in movies, scripted series, and the theater. One of her first roles in theater was Wendla in the Israeli production of Spring Awakening. In 2018, Tayeb had a role in the Israeli TV series, When Heroes Fly. Tayeb was also the singing voice for Mary Poppins in the Hebrew dub of the Disney movie and the singing voice of Tiana in the Hebrew dub for Disney's The Princess And The Frog.

Tayeb finished her first high-profile international tour in the United States, Canada, and Europe in 2016. The tour featured songs from her most recent release. It was her 5th album and the first to be released and promoted in the United States. As part of her tour, Tayeb was selected to perform at SXSW in March 2016. She was also featured as a guest vocalist on Steven Wilson's tour.

The 2016 tour was the result of Tayeb's short visit to the U.S. in 2015, which created an extensive buzz and high demand for this "infectious female artist". During her time in the United States, Ninet performed in several critically acclaimed concerts in New York City. One critic stated that "the entire audience was fixated and almost hypnotized by [Tayeb's] presence." Another claimed that "[Tayeb's] bold renditions of songs like 'Crazy' and her original releases have showcased the range in which [Tayeb] approaches music and thus identifies with at least some part of all of us."

In preparation for her 2016 tour, Tayeb released two new singles from her upcoming album: "Paper Parachute" and "Child". The two songs "promise an album worth waiting for," and were described as ones in which Tayeb's "haunting vocals are backed by clever production work and energy fulfilling beats."

=== Early work ===
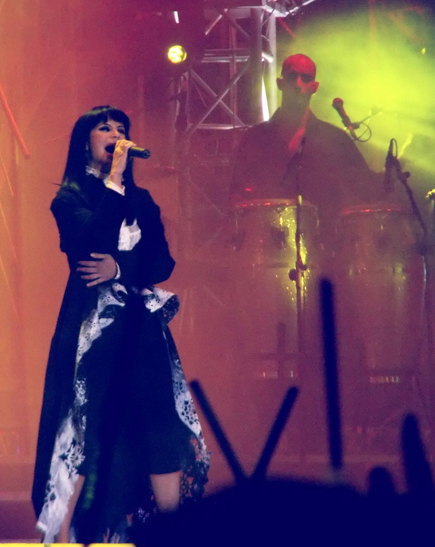
Ninet in 2006

==== Barefoot and Acting ====
Tayeb released her debut album, Barefoot (Yechefa, Hebrew: יחפה) on September 7, 2006. It was certified Platinum in less than 24 hours, having charted five no. 1 singles on the national radio. Barefoot was released by Helicon and was produced and primarily composed and written by Israeli rock musician Aviv Geffen.

Tayeb's acting career took rise when starred in Hashir Shelanu ("Our Song"), a TV series based on her life story. The show was created to capitalize on Tayeb's unprecedented popularity and lasted for four seasons.

=== Musical transformation ===
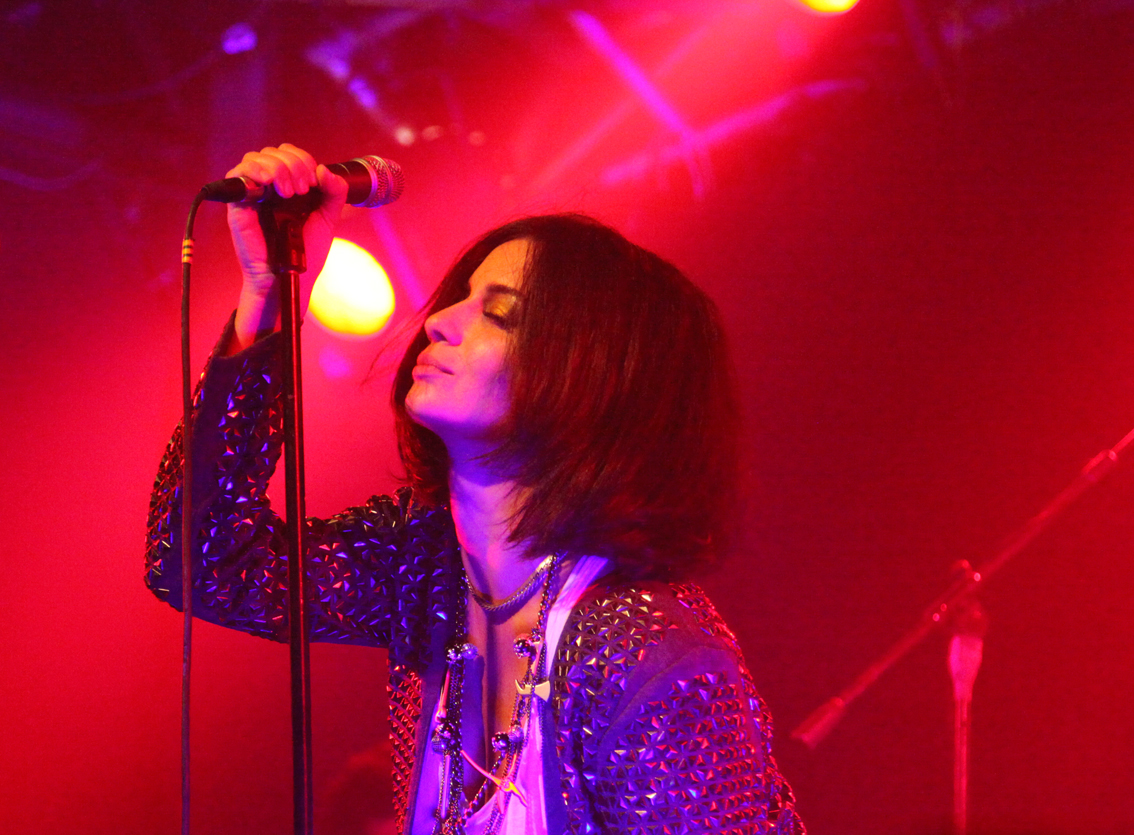
Ninet in 2009

==== Communicative ====
On November 17, 2009, Ninet released her second album, Communicative, (Comunicativi, Hebrew: קומוניקטיבי). She wrote all of the lyrics, composed the majority of it, and produced the album with Rockfour.

Communicative was a musical shift and was released a turning point regarding Tayeb's public image. Audience members threw objects at Tayeb during the album's launch performance. Tayeb described this incident as a "professional watershed." Tayeb, who used to fill out major venues, found herself performing in front of significantly smaller audiences with sometimes fewer than 20 guests.

Her exploration of musical influences began to bear fruit as Communicative was praised by critics and fans, and was considered to be one of the most discussed albums in recent years. A new audience began to attend her performances, and attendance gradually grew and became more frequent.

==== Sympathetic Nervous System ====
Ninet released her third album, Sympathetic Nervous System (SNS), on May 30, 2012. SNS received positive reviews and is considered one of Ninet's best albums.

The album was composed and written by Ninet in English, produced by Mike Crossey, and recorded at the Motor Museum Studio in Liverpool. In SNS Ninet continued to establish herself as an indie-rock singer-songwriter, twice winning Israel's Favorite Act at the MTV Europe Music Awards.

Ninet started to perform as a DJ at events and festivals in and outside of Israel.

==== All the Animals knew ====
On May 3, 2013, Ninet released her fourth album, "All the Animals Knew" (Hebrew: כל החיות ידעו, Kol Haot Yadu). After the last album was all in English, this time Ninet went back to writing in Hebrew. She wrote and composed all of the songs in the album, except for 2 songs written by Israeli poet, Dori Manor. The album was produced by Joseph "Yossi" E-Shine Mizrachi (Ninet's future husband) and Idan Rabinovici, members of Israeli indie-rock band "Acollective".

==== Paper Parachute ====
In 2015 Ninet released the singles "Paper Parachute" and "Child". In 2016 she released the singles "Superstar" and "Subservient". She moved from Israel to Los Angeles in the United States in July 2016, where she began to perform more regularly. Her fifth album "Paper Parachute" was released on February 3, 2017.

Other songs

In June 2015 she released a single called "What Happened" ('Ma Kara') in Hebrew. The song was created by Ninet and produced by her husband Joseph "Yossi" E-Shine Mizrachi. The song criticizes sexual attacks committed by people of high social status and their subsequent lack of appropriate punishment, and the system that ultimately blames the victims for daring to speak out.

On January 9, 2018, a new music video was released in Hebrew called "Hero" ('Gibor'), written by Ninet and composed by Israeli artist Dudu Tassa. The music video was filmed in the United States. In November 2018 she released her single "Self Destructive Mind".

In December 2018, as part of the annual Hanukkah celebrations, she performed with a variety of Israeli artists (Omer Adam, Marina Maximilian, the Ma Kashur trio, Idan Amadi, Nadav Gedge and Eleni Foureira) in a show called Pop Up Music in Tel Aviv, Israel.

=== International collaborations ===
- Steven Wilson – Ninet sang on two tracks on Steven Wilson's 2015 album, Hand. Cannot. Erase. He described Ninet as "inspiring" and "a fantastic singer" who has an "amazing voice" and is "very easy to work with". Ninet also performed alongside Wilson at the Royal Albert Hall in September 2015 and at Belasco Theater in LA November 2016. Ninet was again featured on a release by Wilson on "4½" on the new version of "Don't Hate Me", originally recorded by Wilson's other band Porcupine Tree on the album Stupid Dream. This version is sung as a duet between Wilson and Tayeb. That same year, Ninet was featured again on Wilson's tour, with appearances in both Europe and North America. In May 2017, Wilson released his single "Pariah" online, featuring vocals by Ninet. Ninet provides vocals for two other tracks on Wilson's album To the Bone (August 2017), as well as backing vocals on three other tracks. Tayeb performed with Wilson once more at the Royal Albert Hall in March 2018 as part of his Home Invasion concert series, and she is featured on several tracks on the recording of that concert, which was released on November 2, 2018.
- Gary Lucas – After meeting with Jeff Buckley's guitarist and songwriter, Gary Lucas, the latter invited Ninet to record a song that he co-wrote with Buckley but was never recorded. Ninet performed alongside Lucas in a tribute in Paris. Lucas summarized his work with Ninet saying that "Ninet is one of the best singers I've ever worked with. I think she's absolutely incredible, stunning, has a magnificence stage presence, and a terrific energy".
- Cyndi Lauper – Ninet was the opening act for Lauper in her concert in Israel in 2014, and performed a vocal duet of "True Colors" with Lauper during that concert.
- The Jesus and Mary Chain – In October 2012, Ninet was a surprise guest in the Indie legends Jesus and Mary Chain performance in Tel Aviv.
- The Dead Daisies – In December 2013, Ninet performed with the Australian rock n roll super-group, The Dead Daisies, as part of their tour in Tel Aviv, Israel.
- Robbie Williams – Ninet was the opening act for Robbie Williams during his 2015 performance in Tel Aviv.

== Personal life ==
Tayeb was previously in a high-profile relationship with fellow HaShir Shelanu star Ran Danker. Israeli media labeled the pair "Raninet". She was later in another high-profile relationship with the Israeli actor, Yehuda Levi to whom she was engaged. Haaretz described them as "Israel's favorite celebrity couple", with The Jerusalem Post declaring them "Israel's Brangelina". They announced their split in 2013 after eight years together. Both Danker and Levi have been described as the two most talked-about male stars in Israel. Tayeb and Danker remain friends and when asked in a 2019 Ynet interview about his former partner, Danker said that they will soon be in touch and will collaborate. The pair performed together in September 2019.

In 2014, Tayeb married Israeli music producer and guitarist Joseph "Yossi" E-Shine Mizrachi in Tel Aviv, after a year together. In 2015, their first daughter Emilia Sarah Mizrachi was born. In 2016 they relocated to Los Angeles where she has written the follow-up album to Paper Parachute. In 2021, their second daughter Luna Rachel was born.

== Discography ==
- 2006 – Barefoot
- 2009 – Communicative
- 2012 – Sympathetic Nervous System
- 2013 – All the Animals Knew
- 2017 – Paper Parachute
- 2023 – I Got Up to Dance
- 2026 – I’m Nina

== Filmography ==
Year	Title	Role	Notes
2004-2005	HaShir Shelanu	Ninet Levi/Ninet Tayeb	Series regular 213 episodes
2009	The Assassin Next Door (Kirot)	Elinor	Film
2014	Zaguri Imperia	Lizi	Series regular
2014	Ramzor	Nina	Guest appearance 1 episode
2018	When Heroes Fly	Yael	Series regular
2025	Fireflies	Mimi	Series regular

== Awards and nominations ==
- Sounds and Voices – First Place, 2001.
- Kokhav Nolad – First place, 2003.
- Golden Screen Awards – won Best Actress in A Daily Drama, 2005.
- Pnai Plus Magazine – The Beautiful "Right People" project – First place, 2005.
- Shir Nolad – First place, 2006.
- The Israeli Music Channel Awards – won Singer Of the Year award, 2007.
- Jerusalem Radio – Singer Of The Year, 2007.
- People Of The Year – nominated for Person Of The Year In Musics in 2006 and 2009.
- Song of The Decade project (Channel 24 and Galgalatz) – Singer of the decade nomination.
- MTV Europe Music Awards – Won Israel's favorite act, 2009.
- MTV Europe Music Awards – Won Israel's favorite act, 2012.

== Other projects ==
- In 2015, Ninet was hosted in the second album of Dudu Tassa & The Kuwaitis, where she performed a song in Arabic. Dudu Tassa & The Kuwaitis is a special project led by Israeli musician Dudu Tassa, which relives the songs of Tassa's grandfather and great uncle, the Al-Kuwaiti Brothers, who were Jewish-Iraqi musicians famous in Israel and throughout the Arab world.
- In 2014, Ninet was hosted in Shlomi Shaban album "Wakening Exercise".
- From 2011 and on, Ninet performed and collaborated several times with the Israeli-American Puppeteers band, Red Band. Their most famous collaboration is a cover of Gnarls Barkley's hit "Crazy", as well as Radiohead's "High and Dry", Annie Lennox's "I Put a Spell On You" and The Weeknd's "Can't Feel My Face".
- In 2011, Ninet collaborated with Israeli singer-songwriter, Gilad Cahana, within the album "The Walking Man 2". The album was entirely written in English. Ninet performed the songs of the album alongside Cahana.
- In 2010, Ninet took part in the original project "30+", led by the musicians Elad Cohen and Sagi Tzoref, where she performed a duet with Israeli singer-songwriter, Yali Sobol.
- In the annual musical project "Hebrew Labor" of 2008 (new versions of Israeli classics), Ninet recorded Ilan Virtzberg's song to late poet Yona Wallach lyrics, "I Couldn't Do Anything With This".
- In memory of late Israeli music legend, Ofra Haza, Ninet recorded, along with Ivri Lider, a pop-rock version of Haza's song "This Pain". The duet became a hit in Israel in 2007.
- Throughout the years, Ninet was invited to perform in tribute concerts dedicated to several artists, such as Meir Ariel, Inbal Perlmutter, Elliott Smith, etc.
- In 2023 Ninet wrote the song "Rock Bottom" for Steven Wilson's album The Harmony Codex, their sixth duet after "Routine" and "Ancestral" from Hand. Cannot. Erase., and "Pariah", "People Who Eat Darkness" and "Blank Tapes" from To the Bone.

Awards and achievements
Preceded by Debut Entry	Kokhav Nolad winner 2003	Succeeded by Harel Moyal
