= Hand. Cannot. Erase. =

Studio album by Steven Wilson
- Released: 27 February 2015
- Recorded: September 2014
- Studios: No Man's Land (Hemel Hempstead); AIR Studios (London); Angel Recording Studios (London); EastWest Studios (Los Angeles)
- Genres: Progressive rock; progressive pop
- Length: 65:44
- Label: Kscope
- Producer: Steven Wilson

Steven Wilson chronology
Drive Home (2013)	Hand. Cannot. Erase. (2015)	Transience (2015)

Hand. Cannot. Erase. is the fourth solo studio album by English musician Steven Wilson. The album was released on 27 February 2015 through Kscope. Critics praised the album as a masterwork, and it entered the UK Rock Albums Chart at number 1 in March 2015.

== Writing and recording ==
The concept album was recorded in September 2014 at AIR Studios, London, UK. All band members of the previous album are also featured on the new recording. When discussing the lack of Theo Travis's input on the record, Steven Wilson described the album as less "jazzy" in comparison to the previous album, featuring only a few parts written for flutes and saxophones. Wilson also described the album as more reflective of all of the different material in his back catalogue, featuring elements of electronic music and straightforward pop songs alongside long progressive-oriented tracks. Alongside Wilson, the album features Ninet Tayeb on vocals, and the sequences featuring boy choristers is inspired by the track "All the Love", from The Dreaming, an album by Kate Bush.

== Themes and concept ==
According to Wilson, the concept album is written from a female perspective. The album's concept and story are inspired by the case of Joyce Carol Vincent, where a woman living in a large city dies in her apartment and no one misses her for over two years, despite her having family and friends. Wilson explained:

"The basic story, or concept of the record – it's about a woman growing up, who goes to live in the city, very isolated, and she disappears one day and no one notices. There's more to it than that. Now, what's really interesting about this story is that your initial reaction when you hear a story like that is, 'Ah, little old bag lady that no one notices, no one cares about.' [Vincent] wasn't [like that]. She was young, she was popular, she was attractive, she had many friends, she had family, but for whatever reason, nobody missed her for three years."

== Release and promotion ==
The album was released in February 2015. A deluxe version of the album was also made available. Wilson and his band embarked on a tour through the UK and Europe in March and April 2015 in support of the album, with a setlist that was "based around the new album, of course, as well as casting the net further back into [his] past for a few surprises."

Music from the album started being released to the public in January 2015, when a teaser trailer was released online, accompanied with a link to a blog written by the album's main character – a reclusive artist who writes about her interest in people who go missing and her talent for hiding in public. On 4 February 2015 a video for "Perfect Life" was released via Wilson's official YouTube channel.

== Critical reception ==
Professional ratings
Aggregate scores
Source	Rating
Metacritic	89/100
Review scores
Source	Rating
AllMusic	4.5/5 stars
All About Jazz	5/5 stars
Classic Rock	8/10
The Guardian	5/5 stars
Metal Hammer	6/7 stars
PopMatters	8.5/10
Q	4/5 stars
Record Collector	5/5 stars
Rock Hard	8.5/10
Sputnikmusic	5/5

Hand. Cannot. Erase. received acclaim from critics. Metacritic, a review aggregator, gave the album a weighted average rating of 89 out of 100, indicating universal acclaim, based on reviews from 8 critics. The Guardian rated the album five stars and called it "a smart, soulful and immersive work of art". Eclipsed magazine described the album as "one more shining jewel in the discography of Steven Wilson. Modern, disturbing, brilliant!" Metal Hammer awarded Hand. Cannot. Erase. 6/7 and described it as "another masterpiece". US website FDRMX rated the album 4.8/5 and stated "Hand. Cannot. Erase. grabs your full attention from the beginning to the very final note, and that's the sign of a great album".

All About Jazz awarded Hand. Cannot. Erase. 5 stars and said "As someone capable of delivering accessible music that is, at the same time, compositionally and lyrically deep—detailed and, at times, unapologetically complex—Wilson makes absolutely no compromises in doing what he does". Another 5 star review appeared in the March 2015 edition of Record Collector, who praised the album's "spellbinding poignancy and aching beauty".

German magazine Visions declared Hand. Cannot. Erase. to be "The Wall for the Facebook generation".

== Track listing ==
All tracks are written by Steven Wilson.

No.	Title	Length
1.	"First Regret" (instrumental)	2:01
2.	"3 Years Older"	10:18
3.	"Hand Cannot Erase"	4:17
4.	"Perfect Life"	4:46
5.	"Routine"	8:58
6.	"Home Invasion"	6:24
7.	"Regret #9" (instrumental)	5:00
8.	"Transience"	2:43
9.	"Ancestral"	13:30
10.	"Happy Returns"	6:00
11.	"Ascendant Here On..." (instrumental)	1:54
Total length:		65:44

Deluxe edition disc 2 (CD)
No.	Title	Length
1.	"First Regret" (demo)	2.28
2.	"3 Years Older" (demo)	11:47
3.	"Hand Cannot Erase" (demo)	4:52
4.	"Routine" (demo)	10:06
5.	"Key of Skeleton" (demo)	4:06
6.	"Ancestral" (demo)	13:42
7.	"Happy Returns" (demo)	5.42
8.	"Last Regret" (demo)	3:08

Bonus material (Blu-ray)
No.	Title	Length
1.	"First Regret" (alternate mix)	2:04
2.	"Hand Cannot Erase" (radio edit)	3:29
3.	"Perfect Life" (grand union mix)	7:45
4.	"Routine" (Ninet solo vocal version)	8:58
5.	"Regret #9" (alternate take)	4:17
6.	"Happy Returns" (radio edit)	3:54

Digital version
No.	Title	Length
1.	"First Regret / 3 Years Older"	12:19
2.	"Hand Cannot Erase"	4:17
3.	"Perfect Life"	4:46
4.	"Routine"	8:58
5.	"Home Invasion / Regret #9"	11:29
6.	"Transience"	2:43
7.	"Ancestral"	13:30
8.	"Happy Returns / Ascendant Here On..."	7:54

== Personnel ==
Adapted from Hand. Cannot. Erase. liner notes. (Track indices refer to the CD version)

Band

- Steven Wilson – lead vocals, Mellotron (tracks 1–10), keyboards (tracks 1, 2, 4, 6, 7 and 8), guitars (tracks 2–10), bass guitar (tracks 1, 2 and 5–7), banjo (track 7), hammered dulcimer (track 9), programming (tracks 1–5, 9 and 10), shaker (tracks 3, 5 and 6), effects (tracks 1, 2, 4, 5 and 9–11)
- Guthrie Govan – guitar (tracks 1, 2, 6, 7, 9 and 10), lead guitar (tracks 5, 7 and 9)
- Nick Beggs – bass guitar (tracks 3 and 9), Chapman Stick (tracks 4, 6, 7 and 10), backing vocals (tracks 2, 4–6, 9 and 10)
- Adam Holzman – piano (tracks 1–3, 5–7 and 9–11), Hammond organ (tracks 1–3, 5–7, 9 and 10), celesta (tracks 3, 5 and 9), Fender Rhodes (tracks 3, 4, 6 and 9), Wurlitzer (track 7), Moog Voyager synthesizer (track 7)
- Marco Minnemann – drums (tracks 2–7 and 9)

Additional musicians

- Dave Gregory – guitars (tracks 2, 3 and 10)
- Chad Wackerman – drums (track 10)
- Ninet Tayeb – vocals (tracks 5 and 9), backing vocals (track 3)
- Theo Travis – flute and baritone saxophone (track 9)
- Katherine Begley – spoken word (track 4, erroneously listed as "Katherine Jenkins" in the liner notes)
- Leo Blair – solo vocal (track 5)
- Schola Cantorum of the Cardinal Vaughan Memorial School – choir (tracks 5, 10 and 11)
- London Session Orchestra – strings (tracks 9 and 10)

Production

- Steven Wilson – production, composition, arrangements, mixing, 5.1 mixing, artwork design
- Dave Stewart — arrangements, conducting, transcription
- Steve Price – string engineer
- Laurence Anslow – engineer
- Steve Orchard – engineer
- Lasse Hoile — artwork, photography, film director
- Hajo Mueller — illustrations
- Carl Glover – design, layout

== Charts ==
Chart (2015)	Peak position
Austrian Albums (Ö3 Austria)	12
Belgian Albums (Ultratop Flanders)	26
Belgian Albums (Ultratop Wallonia)	34
Canadian Albums (Billboard)	24
Dutch Albums (Album Top 100)	2
Finnish Albums (Suomen virallinen lista)	4
French Albums (SNEP)	47
German Albums (Offizielle Top 100)	3
Italian Albums (FIMI)	29
Japanese Albums (Oricon)	277
Norwegian Albums (VG-lista)	11
Polish Albums (ZPAV)	10
Spanish Albums (Promusicae)	58
Swedish Albums (Sverigetopplistan)	33
Swiss Albums (Schweizer Hitparade)	17
UK Albums (OCC)	13
UK Rock Albums (OCC)	1
UK Independent Albums (OCC)	2
US Billboard 200	39
