= Firefly (disambiguation) =

Firefly is a common name for a bioluminescent beetle in the family Lampyridae.

Firefly or fireflies may also refer to:

== Organizations and companies ==
- Firefly (airline), a subsidiary of Malaysia Airlines
- Firefly (car rental), an international car hire company owned by Hertz
- Firefly Aerospace, a private aerospace firm based in Austin, Texas; formerly "Firefly Space Systems"
- Firefly Arts Collective, a New England regional burning event
- Firefly Distillery, a distillery based in South Carolina that manufactures a line of vodka products
- Firefly (marque), an electric car brand owned by Nio Inc.
- Firefly Tonics, an English producer of fruit juice drinks with added herbal extracts
- Firefly Learning, an educational technology company from London
- Firefly Studios, a computer game developer from London

== Entertainment ==
=== Fictional elements ===
- Firefly (DC Comics), a Batman villain
- Firefly (Archie Comics), a character in the Archie comic book universe
- Firefly (G.I. Joe), a villain in the G.I. Joe universe, member of Cobra
- Firefly (Honkai: Star Rail), a character featured in the Penacony chapter of the game Honkai: Star Rail
- Rufus T. Firefly, a character played by Groucho Marx in the 1933 film Duck Soup
- The Fireflies, a rebel militia in the game The Last of Us

=== Film and television ===
- Firefly (TV series), a 2002 science fiction TV program created by Joss Whedon
  - Firefly (franchise), a science fiction franchise stemming from the TV program created by Joss Whedon
- Firefly (2000 film), a Japanese film directed by Naomi Kawase
- Firefly (2005 film), an independent film directed by Pete Marcy
- Firefly (2023 film), a Philippine film directed by Zig Dulay
- The Firefly (1937 film), the 1937 film adaptation of the Rudolf Friml operetta starring Allan Jones
- "The Firefly" (Fringe), a 2011 episode of the television series Fringe
- The Firefly (2015 film), a Colombian film directed by Ana Maria Hermida
- Fireflies (2014 film), a Bollywood film by Sabal Singh Shekhawat
- Fireflies (Australian TV series), 2004
- Fireflies (2018 film), an Indian Meitei-language documentary film
- Fireflies (Israeli TV series), 2025
- Fireflies: Parth Aur Jugnu, an Indian web series

=== Literature ===
- Firefly, a 1990 science-fiction novel by Piers Anthony
- Firefly (novel), 2021, by Philippa Dowding
- Fireflies, a 1988 memoir by David Morrell (writer)
- Fireflies (novel), 1970, by Shiva Naipaul
- The Firefly, a 2003 novel by P. T. Deutermann

=== Music ===
==== Bands ====
- Fire Flies, an American rock band based in New York City
- The Fireflies, an American doo wop group
- Firefly (band), the Filipino Indie rock bands

==== Albums ====
- Firefly (Emily Remler album), 1981
- Firefly (Jeremy Steig album), 1977
- Firefly (TNT album), 1997
- Firefly (Uriah Heep album), 1977
- Firefly (Sara Storer album), 2005
- Firefly, 2001, by Garnet Rogers
- Fireflies (Faith Hill album), 2005
- Fireflies (Frodus album), 1995
- Fireflies, 1998, by Rubygrass, fronted by Oskar Saville

==== Songs ====
- "Firefly" (Christina Metaxa song), the Cypriot entry to the Eurovision Song Contest 2009, sung by Christina Metaxa
- "Firefly" (Cy Coleman song), recorded by Tony Bennett in 1958
  - "Firefly", recorded by Tony Bennett and Lady Gaga on their 2014 album Cheek to Cheek
- "Firefly" (InMe song), 2002
- "Fireflies" (Leona Lewis song), 2012
- "Fireflies" (Martin Garrix and U2 song), 2026
- "Fireflies" (Owl City song), 2009
- "Fireflies" (Zendaya song), 2013
- "Fire Fly", by Mike Oldfield on his 2002 Tres Lunas album
- "Fire Fly", by Childish Gambino on his 2011 Camp album
- "Firefly", by American Music Club on their 1988 California album
- "Firefly", by Blackfield on their 2013 album, Blackfield IV
- "Firefly", by A*Teens on their 2001 Teen Spirit album
- "Firefly", by Saves the Day on their 2001 Stay What You Are album
- "Firefly", by BeForU on their 2003 self-titled album
- "Firefly", by Breaking Benjamin on their 2004 We Are Not Alone album
- "Fireflies", by Fleetwood Mac on their 1980 album Live
- "Fire Flies", by Gorillaz on their 2018 album The Now Now
- "Fireflies", by Patti Smith from her 1996 album Gone Again
- "Fireflies", by JJ Grey & MOFRO on their 2004 album Lochloosa
- "Fireflies", by Finch on their 2005 Say Hello to Sunshine album
- "Fireflies", by Rhett Miller on his 2006 The Believer album
- "Fireflies", by Chris Garneau from his 2009 El Radio album
- "Fireflies", by Richard Rawson featuring Tom Parker
- "Euphoria (Firefly)", by Delerium
- "Fireflies", by Sam and the Womp
- "Firefly", by Jim Yosef for NoCopyrightSounds
- "Fireflies", by Doechii from her 2024 Alligator Bites Never Heal mixtape

==== Other uses in music ====
- Firefly Music Festival, an annual American music festival held in Dover, Delaware
- The Firefly (operetta), 1912, by Rudolf Friml

=== Other uses in entertainment ===
- The Firefly (operetta), by Rudolf Friml
- Firefly Role-Playing Game, a role-playing game based on the TV series by Joss Whedon, published by Margaret Weis Productions
- Firefly: The Game, a board game based on the TV series by Joss Whedon, published by Gale Force Nine

== Vehicles and transportation technology ==
=== Air ===
==== Airplanes ====
- Fairey Firefly, a 1940s British, naval, reconnaissance and fighter aircraft
- Fairey Firefly I, a 1920s British biplane fighter project (cancelled)
- Fairey Firefly IIM, a 1930s British biplane fighter
- Kolb Firefly, an American ultralight aircraft
- MBB Lampyridae 'Firefly', a German stealth fighter project during the 1980s
- Slingsby T67 Firefly, a British light training aircraft

==== Drones ====
- Globe KD2G Firefly, an American target drone
- Ryan AQM-91 Firefly, an American long-range reconnaissance drone

==== Helicopters ====
- Sikorsky Firefly, an all-electric helicopter built for research purposes

=== Land ===
==== Automobile ====
- Firefly (vehicle), an electric subcompact hatchback sold by Nio Inc's Firefly marque
- Pontiac Firefly, a subcompact automobile based on the Suzuki Cultus
- Fiat Global Small Engine, marketed as "Firefly"

==== Rail ====
- Firefly (train), a U.S. passenger train operated by the St. Louis - San Francisco Railway
- GWR Firefly Class, a class of steam locomotive on the Great Western Railway
- Firefly, a steam locomotive operated by the Orange and Alexandria Railroad

==== Military ====
- Sherman Firefly, a British variant of the M4 Sherman military tank

=== Nautical ===
- Firefly (1843), a ship used by the colony of Victoria for a rescue party for the Burke and Wills expedition in northern Australia, 1861
- Firefly (dinghy), a type of sailing dinghy
- Firefly (Taiping Rebellion steamer), an armed Chinese steamer used in the 1860s
- HMS Firefly, several ships of the Royal Navy
- HMT Firefly, a British trawler that operated between 1930 and 1961
- USS Firefly (1814), a brig formerly named Volant

=== Space ===
- FireFly (spacecraft), an asteroid-searching spacecraft proposed by Deep Space Industries
- Firefly Alpha, a small orbital-class rocket in development

== Technology ==
=== Hardware ===
- Firefly PC Remote, a remote control by SnapStream Media used to control Windows-based computers
- Firefly (mobile phone), a simplified cellphone designed for young children

=== Computers ===
- Firefly (supercomputer)
- DEC Firefly, a multiprocessor workstation

=== Software ===
- Firefly (cache coherence protocol), a method of caching used in the DEC Firefly
- Firefly (computer program), an ab initio computational chemistry software
- Firefly (key exchange protocol), a security protocol used in telephony
- Fireflies (computer graphics), a rendering artifact
- Firefly algorithm, an algorithm for mathematical optimization
- Firefly Media Server, an audio media server for the Roku SoundBridge and iTunes
- Adobe Firefly, a generative artificial intelligence

== Other uses ==
- Firefly Estate, Jamaica
- Firefly (website), an online community developed in the late 1990s

== See also ==
- Firefly Festival (disambiguation)
- Fire (disambiguation)
- Fly (disambiguation)
