= Leaplay Music =

- Founded: 2009
- Founder: Ken Suh; Joon Kim
- Distributor: Bugs Corp.
- Genre: Various
- Country of origin: South Korea
- Location: Seoul
- Official website: facebook.com/leaplay

Leaplay Music is a record label, founded in 2009, based in Seoul, South Korea.

The company is mainly dealing with licensing work, introducing international musicians for Korean music industry, organizing concerts and showcases, etc.

The label is known for their successful international artists, such as Chris Garneau, Angus & Julia Stone, Michelle Shaprow. The label also works with domestic bands, Mighty Coala(마이티 코알라) 와, Starry-Eyed (스타리아이드).

In 2011, the label has broadened its music genres to Jazz, introduced NYC based Jazz singer, Nina Vidal.

In 2012, releasing James Iha, a former guitarist from Smashing Pumpkins, had a breakthrough comeback show at Jisan Valley Rock Festival.

Also, American singer songwriter Michelle Shaprow and Norwegian rock band Bellman performed the best Autumn music festival in Korea, Grand Mint Festival.

In 2013, Pet Shop Boys performed new summer rock festival, Super Sonic Korea and released Backstreet Boys, Goldfrapp, Moby, Olivier Libaux 's new titles in Korea territory.

== International musicians ==
- Angus & Julia Stone
- Backstreet Boys
- Bellman
- Brian McKnight
- Chris Garneau
- Fitness Forever
- Goldfrapp
- Gui Boratto
- Hello Saferide
- James Iha
- Jennifer Waescher
- Mew
- Michelle Shaprow
- Moby
- Nina Vidal
- Olivier Libaux
- Pet Shop Boys
- Raymond & Maria
- Tamas Wells
- They Live By Night
- The Sound of Arrows

== Domestic musicians ==
- Mighty Coala (마이티 코알라)
- Starry-Eyed (스타리아이드)
- Ravie Nuage (하비누아주)
- Jung Jae Il (정재일)
