= Firefly Festival =

Firefly Festival may refer to:

- Firefly Music Festival, annual music festival held at the Dover International Speedway in Dover, Delaware, United States
- Fireflies Festival of Sacred Music, annual music festival held at the Fireflies Ashram in Bangalore, India
- Firefly Arts Collective, non-profit organization that facilitates the annual New England regional burner festival 'Firefly'
- Muju Firefly Festival, Korea's annual representative environmental festival held on the theme of Firefly, Natural Treasure No. 322

== See also ==
- Firefly (disambiguation)
