= Jean-Claude Corbeil =

Canadian linguist and lexicographer (1932–2022)

Jean-Claude Corbeil OQ
- Born: 3 April 1932; Tétreaultville, Montreal, Quebec, Canada
- Died: 25 January 2022 (aged 89)
- Education: Université de Montréal, University of Strasbourg
- Occupation(s): Linguist, lexicographer
- Awards: National Order of Quebec

Jean-Claude Corbeil, OQ (3 April 1932 – 25 January 2022) was a Canadian linguist and lexicographer. He served as head of the linguistic department at the Office québécois de la langue française from 1971 to 1977 and oversaw the introduction of Quebec's language laws during that decade. He also co-authored several visual dictionaries for Scholastic Corporation, Macmillan Publishers, Firefly Learning, and Merriam-Webster.

== Early life ==
Corbeil was born in the Tétreaultville neighbourhood of Montreal on 3 April 1932. He attended Collège Sainte-Croix in his hometown. He then studied at the Université de Montréal, earning a Bachelor of Arts in 1955 and a teaching degree one year later. Corbeil started working as a teacher at the end of that decade. He subsequently undertook postgraduate studies at the University of Strasbourg, obtaining a doctorate in linguistics from that institution in 1966. Two years later, he became a linguistics professor at the Université de Montréal.

== Career ==
Corbeil co-hosted a radio show on Radio Canada called Langage de mon pays ("Language of my country") from 1968 to 1971, together with Henri Bergeron and Raymond Laplante. He became linguistic director of the Office de la langue française du Québec starting in 1971. In that capacity, he advised the Government of Quebec on its language policy and played a key role in formulating laws such as the Official Language Act (1974) and the Charter of the French Language (1977). He was therefore credited by fellow linguist Nadine Vincent with having "de-anglicized Quebec". He quit as director in 1977 and took a sabbatical year. During this time, he authored L’aménagement linguistique du Québec, which was later published in 1980.

Corbeil worked as secretary of the International Centre for Research and Studies in Fundamental and Applied Linguistics from 1980 to 1988. Its goal was to facilitate cooperation between member states of the Agency of the Francophonie. He was also a member of the International Scientific Committee of Linguamón. He collaborated with Ariane Archambault to devise the first edition of Le Dictionnaire visuel in 1986. It was eventually sold in over 100 countries and translated into more than 35 languages. Corbeil subsequently worked as an advisor to the president of the Council of the French Language in Quebec from 1988 to 1991, after which he retired from the civil service.

Despite his retirement, Corbeil was asked in 1995 by Louise Beaudoin – the minister responsible for the Charter of the French Language at the time – to write a policy statement for the provincial government concerning the renewal of the Charter. It was titled Le français, langue commune: Promouvoir l’usage et la qualité du français, langue officielle et langue commune du Québec ("French, common language: Promoting the use and quality of French, official language and common language of Quebec"). He was subsequently appointed deputy minister overseeing Quebec's language policy, serving in that role until 2000.

== Later life ==
Corbeil was appointed an officer of the Ordre des Arts et des Lettres by the French Ministry of Culture in 2000. He was then conferred the Prix Georges-Émile-Lapalme by the National Assembly of Quebec in November 2002, in recognition of the contributions he made to culture. Three years later, he was invested as an officer of the National Order of Quebec. He was subsequently awarded the Grande Médaille de la Francophonie in 2010. Corbeil died on 25 January 2022, at the age of 89.

== Works ==
- Les Structures Syntaxiques Du Francais Moderne (1968)
- The Facts on File visual dictionary (1986) ISBN 978-0-8288-1926-8
- Scholastic visual dictionary (1990) ISBN 978-0-439-05940-4
- The Macmillan visual dictionary (1992) ISBN 978-0-02-528160-8
- Langues et sociétés en contact (1994) ISBN 978-3-484-56008-6
- The Firefly visual dictionary (2002) ISBN 978-1-55297-585-5
- The Firefly five language visual dictionary (2004) ISBN 978-1-55297-778-1
- Merriam-Webster's visual dictionary (2006) ISBN 978-0-87779-051-8
