= HMS Saucy =

Two vessels of the Royal Navy have been named HMS Saucy:

- HMS Saucy (1918) was a Frisky-class rescue tug launched for the Royal Navy in 1918. She was sold into commercial service in 1924 keeping the same name and hired for Royal Navy service in 1939. She was sunk in 1940.
- HMS Saucy (W131) was an Assurance-class rescue tug launched in 1942. Transferred to the Royal Fleet Auxiliary in 1949 and sold into commercial service in 1965 being renamed Nisos Chios. She was scrapped in 1973.
