= Winter Games (album) =

Studio album by Chris Garneau
- Released: November 2013
- Genre: Americana; indie folk; indie pop
- Length: 40:00
- Label: Private Friend; Clouds Hill; Leaplay Music; Pocket Records
- Producer: Chris Garneau

Chris Garneau chronology
El Radio (2009)	Winter Games (2013)	Yours (2018)

Singles from Winter Games
- 1. "Oh God"

Winter Games is the third studio album by American songwriter Chris Garneau. It was released in 2013 by Private Friend, Leaplay Music (Korea), Pocket Records (China) and in 2014 by Clouds Hill (Europe).

== Recording ==
For this record Garneau asked his closest friends and family to write down their earliest memories of winter to serve as an inspirational base for the writing of these songs. Garneau recorded in a farm in Upstate New York. When asked about how different is the record compared to the other, Garneau answered "On Winter Games I feel like I really play music. There is much more freedom and experimentation with sound. There is much looser form and much more time and patience is given to explore instrumental and other ambient sound." The album features horns and strings arrangements by Rob Moose and CJ Camerieri (both members of Bon Iver and yMusic).

== Critical reception ==
The response by critics was generally positive. Maxime de Abreu for Les Inrockuptibles wrote it is "a magnificent third record". Marcel Schlutt for Kaltblut wrote "Winter Games isn’t a downer. In its own twisted way, it’s triumphant." Jacob Brown for Vogue (magazine) wrote "the songs inhabit a bigger, almost stratospheric aesthetic—none more so than “Oh God”—which possesses a new sound that positions him to a much larger audience." Alex Panisch for Out (magazine) wrote "It's haunting, melancholy, and utterly spellbinding." French website Goûte mes disques wrote that Winter Games is "by far his most accomplished work."

== Track listing ==
1. "Our Man" – 4:52
2. "Oh God" – 3:27
3. "Winter Game #1" – 3:50
4. "Winter Game #2" – 6:14
5. "Danny" – 3:54
6. "The Whore in Yourself" – 4:03
7. "Reindeer" – 3:06
8. "Pas Grave" – 4:50
9. "Catherine" – 3:22
10. "Switzerland" – 2:42
