= Verizon Wireless Migo =

Mobile phone designed for children

Migo, a product of Verizon Wireless, is the successor to the Firefly phone. It stores a limited amount of phone numbers (being the only numbers you can call), controlled by a parental password. The Migo's theme varies in many colors, with two "ears" jutting from the top of the phone. The Migo is marketed as a children's phone.
