= Music for Tourists =

Studio album by Chris Garneau
- Released: 23 January 2007
- Recorded: 2005
- Genre: Indie pop
- Label: Absolutely Kosher
- Producer: Duncan Sheik

Chris Garneau chronology
Music for Tourists (2007)	C-Sides (2007)

Music for Tourists is an indie pop album by Chris Garneau. It was released in the year of 2007 on January 23 on the Absolutely Kosher record label.

== Recording ==
After playing in Brooklyn for some time, Garneau was recommended to record company Absolutely Kosher by Jamie Stewart, whose band Xiu Xiu was on that label. According to Garneau the album took around two years to record before it was released, as producer Duncan Sheik was very busy and there was a lot of downtime during recording.

== Release ==
The album was released on January 23, 2007 and failed to chart in the US. The release was followed by a tour that visited most of the UK and the US in 2007, as well as a few locations in France in 2008.

Garneau said that he chose the 'cartoon-esque' cover art instead of a photo of himself because he wanted to keep it "kind of light".

== Critical reception ==
Professional ratings
Review scores
Source	Rating
AllMusic	2.5/5 stars
Pitchfork	(2.3/10)
PopMatters	(4/10)
Radar Online	3.5/5 stars
Stylus Magazine	B+
Tiny Mix Tapes	1/5 marks

The response by critics was generally negative. Mark Hogan of Pitchfork was particularly critical, calling the lyrics of "Black & Blue" 'just terrible'. PopMatters' Joe Tacopino agreed, calling the album "lyrically atrocious". Matt Thompson of Radar also criticised the lyrics, but concluded that the album wasn't bad. AllMusic's Marisa Brown called it a "cumbersome affair", giving it a rating of 2.5 out of 5.

== Track listing ==
1. "Castle-Time" – 3:58
2. "Relief" – 3:45
3. "Black & Blue" – 5:32
4. "Saturday" – 2:21
5. "So Far" – 4:23
6. "First Place!!!" – 4:14
7. "Hymn" – 1:40
8. "Baby's Romance" – 4:37
9. "Not Nice" – 5:31
10. "Blue Suede Shoes" – 3:09
11. "We Don't Try" – 3:41
12. "Sad News" – 6:01
13. "Halloween" – 4:52
14. "Between the Bars" (Elliott Smith cover) – 3:05
