= C-Sides =

EP by Chris Garneau
- Released: 26 November 2007
- Recorded: 2007
- Genre: Indie pop
- Length: 16:09
- Label: Absolutely Kosher

Chris Garneau chronology
Music for Tourists (2007)	C-Sides (2007)	El Radio (2009)

C-Sides is an indie pop EP by Chris Garneau. It was released on November 26, 2007, on the Absolutely Kosher record label.

== Track listing ==
1. "Love Zombies" – 1:40
2. "Blackout" – 4:56
3. "Runt" – 4:14
4. "Christmas Song" – 2:07
5. "Island Song" – 3:12
