= HMS Saucy (1918) =

British rescue tug

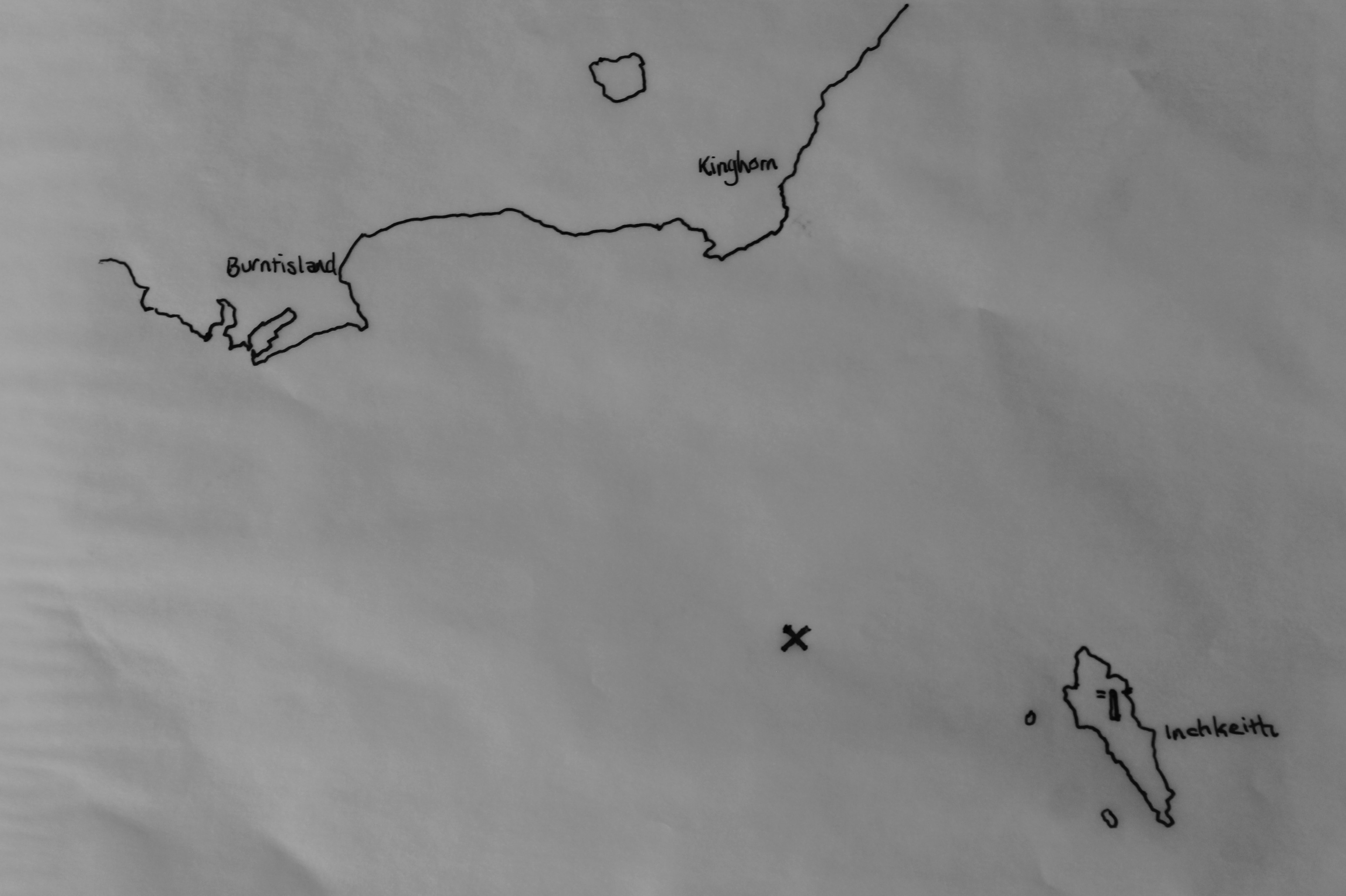
Location of the wreck of HMS Saucy in the Firth of Forth in relation to Inchkeith and to the south Fife coast

HMS Saucy was a British tug hired in the Second World War for use as a rescue tug in the Firth of Forth. She was lost with almost all crew on 4 September 1940 after hitting a mine. Saucy was built as an Admiralty rescue (salvage) tug in the First World War.

== Service ==
She was built in Hessle by Livingstone & Cooper to an order from the Dept of Transport & Shipping for the Royal Navy as a member of the Frisky-class and launched in August 1918. She measured 579 gross register tons and had a displacement of 700 tons, typically for a tug, a large part of the weight was the huge engine, designed to pull larger vessels in salvage operations.

In 1924 she was sold into commercial service but retained the name Saucy. In 1939 she was hired and commissioned by the Royal Navy with a crew of 31. In expectation of war, sea-mines had been laid in many strategic locations to prevent attacks by enemy vessels. The Firth of Forth was one of the many river estuaries so equipped. Mines were generally connected together with horizontal cables, with occasional anchor points to the sea-bed. However, rough seas would regularly detach a mine from its group and these then became a major hazard to shipping. Ironically therefore, minesweepers spent most of their time locating and disarming mines from their own country. Whilst many accounts (particularly contemporary) like to blame the enemy, accidents such as these (which were fairly common) were "self-inflicted wounds" when viewing on a national level.

There is a natural inclination to blame this sort of accident on an "enemy mine", however this sort of sea-mine was a defensive weapon, not a weapon of attack. The main minefield protecting the Forth lay east of Inchkeith, and it would be virtually impossible for a German mine to float through this defensive line. It is therefore a certainty that the mine was a rogue British mine escaped from the main field in one of the preceding winter storms. This was a regular occurrence and was dealt with many local minesweepers such as HMT Firefly which lost 14 crew trying to defuse a British mine.

On the night of 3 September 1940, the rescue tug began to sail towards a Dutch merchant vessel that had received serious damages from a German aircraft. By 1:40 a.m, HMS Saucy had the Dutch ship in tow and began sailing back to Rosyth, later in the daytime, the rescue tug had lost communication, alarms were raised as something was obviously wrong. The ship had come across a mine and had exploded violently without warning and sank within minutes at the spot where she was steaming. Unlike the Firefly (which was actively involved in trying to defuse a mine) all the evidence is that there was no forewarning of a mine near HMS Saucy.

18 of the 26 crew lost were from Brixham in Devon. Only seven bodies were recovered, five being from Brixham. These seven were buried in Seafield Cemetery in north Edinburgh, a few miles south of the disaster site. However it is debated as there may have been 27 crew members lost, one of which not being documented.

== Crew ==
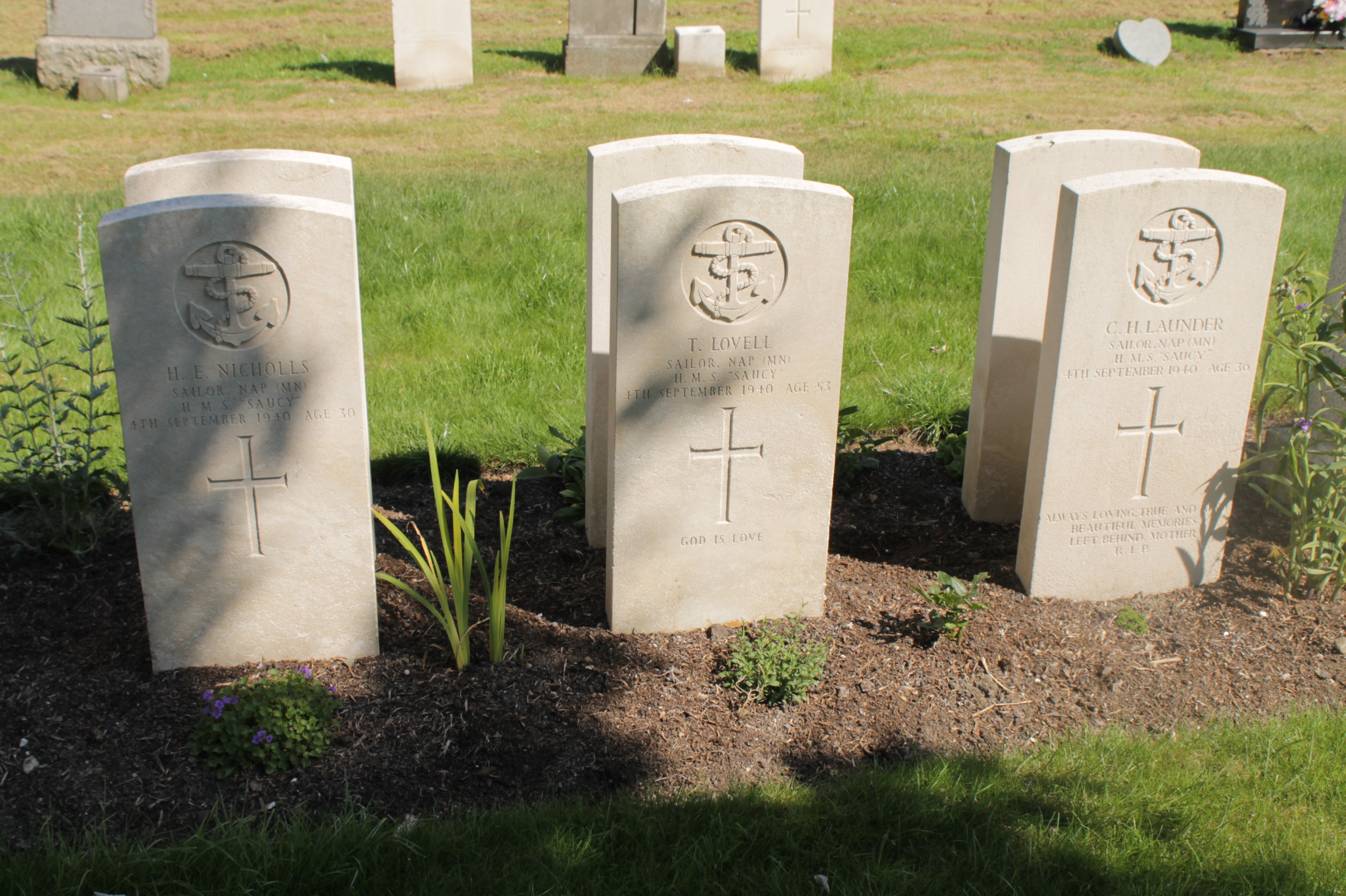
The graves of three crew members.

When first commissioned in 1939, the HMS Saucy had 31 crew members. Most of the crew were from Brixham, and many were related; 3 members of the Harvey family, brothers Roy and Cyril Harvey alongside relative Leonard Turner Harvey, a non-Brixham father and son, Donald and Donald McGregor Reid and more presumed relations. At the time of her demise, the vessel had up to 10 Sailors, 8 Firemen, 4 Sub-Lieutenants, 1 Donkeyman, 1 Steward, 1 Cook and 1 Engineering Officer. The crew itself were a group of men aged from 19 to 65. The oldest six being: 65 year old John Stenhouse, the ship’s cook and son of Robert and Margaret Stenhouse, 53 year old Frederick Whyndham Jones, 53 year old Thomas Lovell, who was one of the few men to be buried in Edinburgh, 51 year old Donald Reid, 42 year old Edward William Pulham and 39 year old Vincent Medway, son of William Medway, Vincent fathered 6 children in Brixham where he was an apprentice sailor.

The deaths/injuries of the crew and subsequent loss of the vessel was a catastrophic event for local residents in Brixham, however tragic accidents like these were not an unusual occurrence considering it was the Second World War. Because of this the story of this and the Firefly, did not receive press coverage.

== Wreckage ==
The wreck lies 15 m deep 2.5 km off Inchkeith island at bearing of 277 degrees from the island, and was permanently marked by an orange buoy. In October 1945 the wreck was reduced by controlled explosion to reduce the hazard to shipping and the buoy was removed. By 1967 a survey revealed that the wreck was no longer perceptible, being lost in the silt.

== Memorial ==
A bronze memorial plaque on the Old Fishmarket Building at Brixham Harbour, unveiled on 4 September 2004, lists the 18 Brixham men lost. The memorial commemorates the following Brixham individuals; John William Clift, Thomas William Coysh, Seymour William Crang, William Herbert Cudd, Sidney Foster, Stanley Edward Gardener, Cyril John Harvey, Leonard Turner Harvey, Roy Harold Harvey, Charles Henry Launder, Vincent Medway, Thomas Lovell, Samuel John Ronald Piper, Harry Edward Nicholls, Charles Edward Roberts, Edward William Pulham, Ralph Edwin George Stamp and John Alfred Seaward. On the memorial, below these names are the 8 names of the non Brixham casualties.

It states that seven of the Brixham men were related to each other. Records show three members of the Harvey family from Brixham, dying, were related to each other. A non-Brixham father and son (the Reids) were related. Two further Brixham relations are presumed to have survived but the survivors were not named.

The 18 men whose bodies went down with the ship, or were otherwise unrecovered, are listed on panel 42 of the Liverpool Naval Memorial.
