= HMS Firefly =

At least seven vessels of the Royal Navy have borne the name HMS Firefly:

- HMS Firefly (1801), was a vessel built in Bermuda that the Royal Navy purchased there in 1801. She was the former John Gordon, which probably had been a privateer. British Admiralty records list an armed ship built in Bermuda in 1801, and purchased in 1803.
- HMS Firefly (1803) was the French privateer schooner Poisson Volant, of 130 tons (bm), which the Royal Navy captured in 1803. She was wrecked on 17 November 1807 off Curaçao; no survivors.
- HMS Firefly (1808) was a 14-gun schooner, the ex-Spanish prize Antelope captured in February 1808 and purchased. She was renamed HMS Antelope in 1812, or possibly in 1809, and was broken up in 1814.
- HMS Firefly (1828), a schooner wrecked on 27 February 1835 on the Northern Triangles, off Belize with the loss of thirteen of her 23 crew.
- HMS Firefly (1832), a Firefly-class gunboat, re-engined in 1844 with the engine from HMS Phoenix and became a survey ship. She was broken up at Malta in 1866.
- HMS Firefly (1877), a British Forester-class gunboat.
- HMS Firefly (1915), a British Fly-class gunboat that the Ottomans captured but that the British recaptured at the Battle of Nahr-al-Kalek in February 1917.
- HMT Firefly, a British trawler that operated between 1930 and 1961, and that between September 1939 to October 1945 served as a minesweeper.
