= Seafield, Edinburgh =

Coastal strip near Edinburgh, Scotland

Coordinates: 55°58′08″N 3°08′37″W

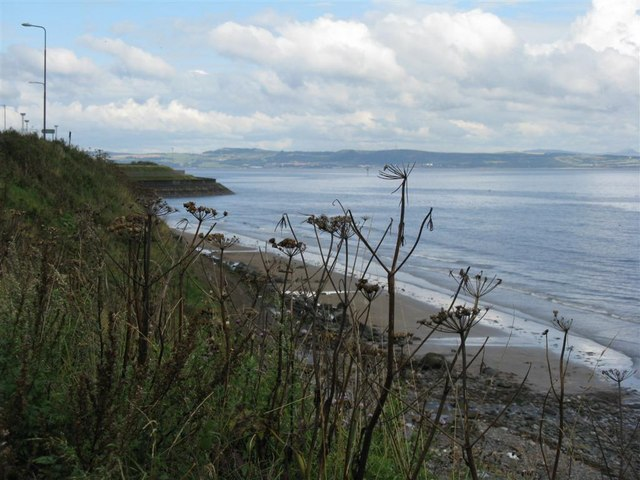
The shore at Seafield

Seafield is a coastal strip situated on the Firth of Forth between Leith and Portobello in north-east Edinburgh, Scotland. The area is mainly commercial, and has little housing. A masterplan was launched in 2024 to redevelop the area into a housing-led mixed-use scheme.

The area is home to Edinburgh Dog and Cat Home, which cares for around 150 of Edinburgh and the Lothians' lost and abandoned cats and dogs. The Lothian Buses Marine depot is also located in Seafield.

The Eastern General Hospital was based here until being demolished in 2008. Its maternity unit served North East Edinburgh and the Borders until 1997.

Since the 1970s, the main sewage treatment works for Edinburgh has been located at Seafield, built on reclaimed land to the east of the Port of Leith.

== Seafield Masterplan ==
In August 2024, a masterplan was launched to redevelop the region with up to 2,700 new homes with a range of styles, plus a waterfront park and promenade. It was developed by 7N Architects in conjunction with civil and transport engineers Cundall, Rankinfraser Landscape Architecture, Max Fordham sustainability, and Nick Wright Planning.

The area is currently characterised by the spine of Seafield Road East, either side of which are large plots for car showrooms and large retail, dominated by car parking. The development proposals include a district heating network to help the city meet its Net Zero goals.

Criticism of the plan highlights that most of the land is not available for redevelopment, and that the main road is expected to become busier due to increased traffic for the Green Freeport, making it difficult to transform into a pleasant boulevard.

== Seafield Cemetery and Crematorium ==
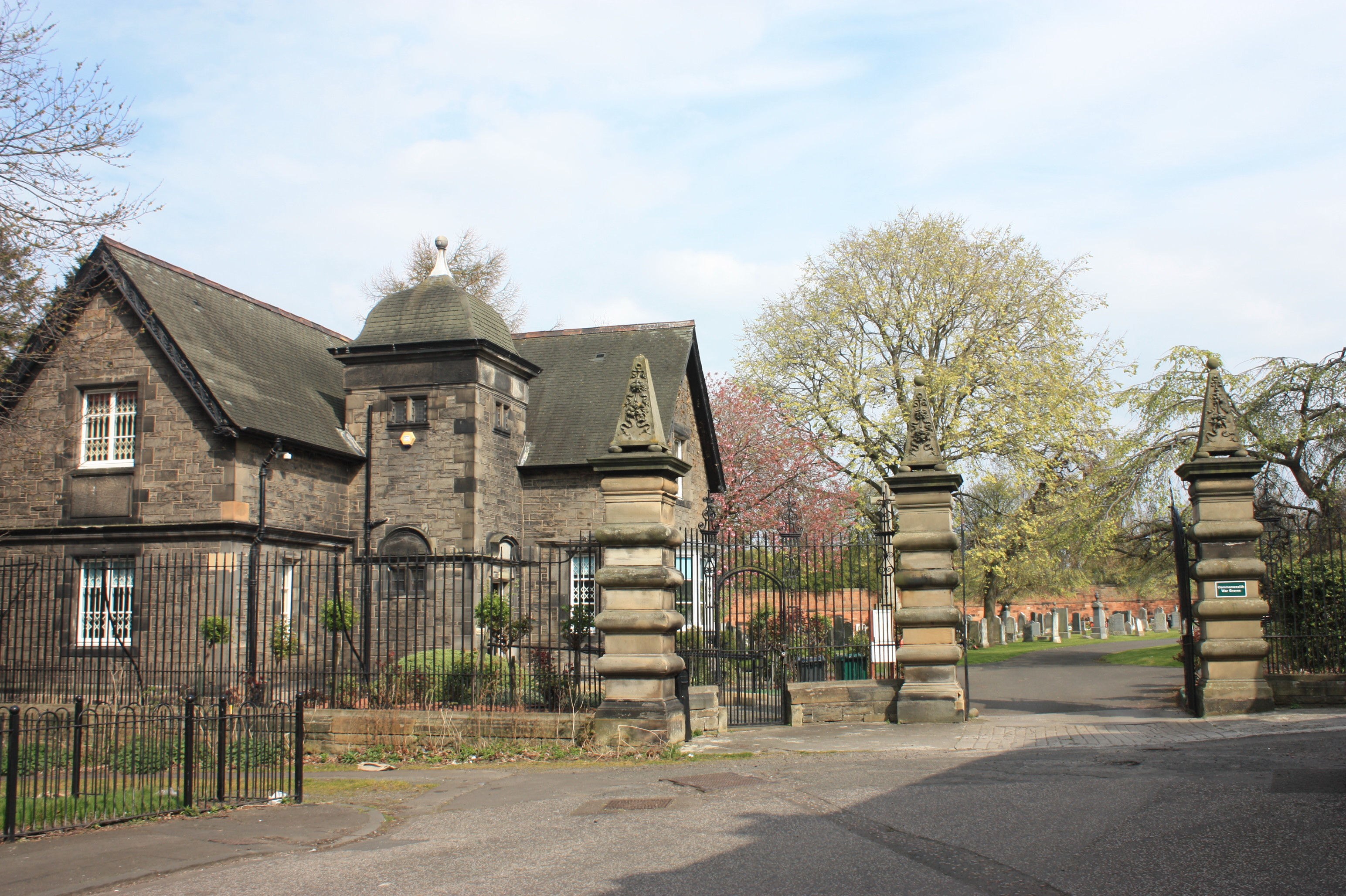
The main gates and gatehouse, Seafield Cemetery, Edinburgh

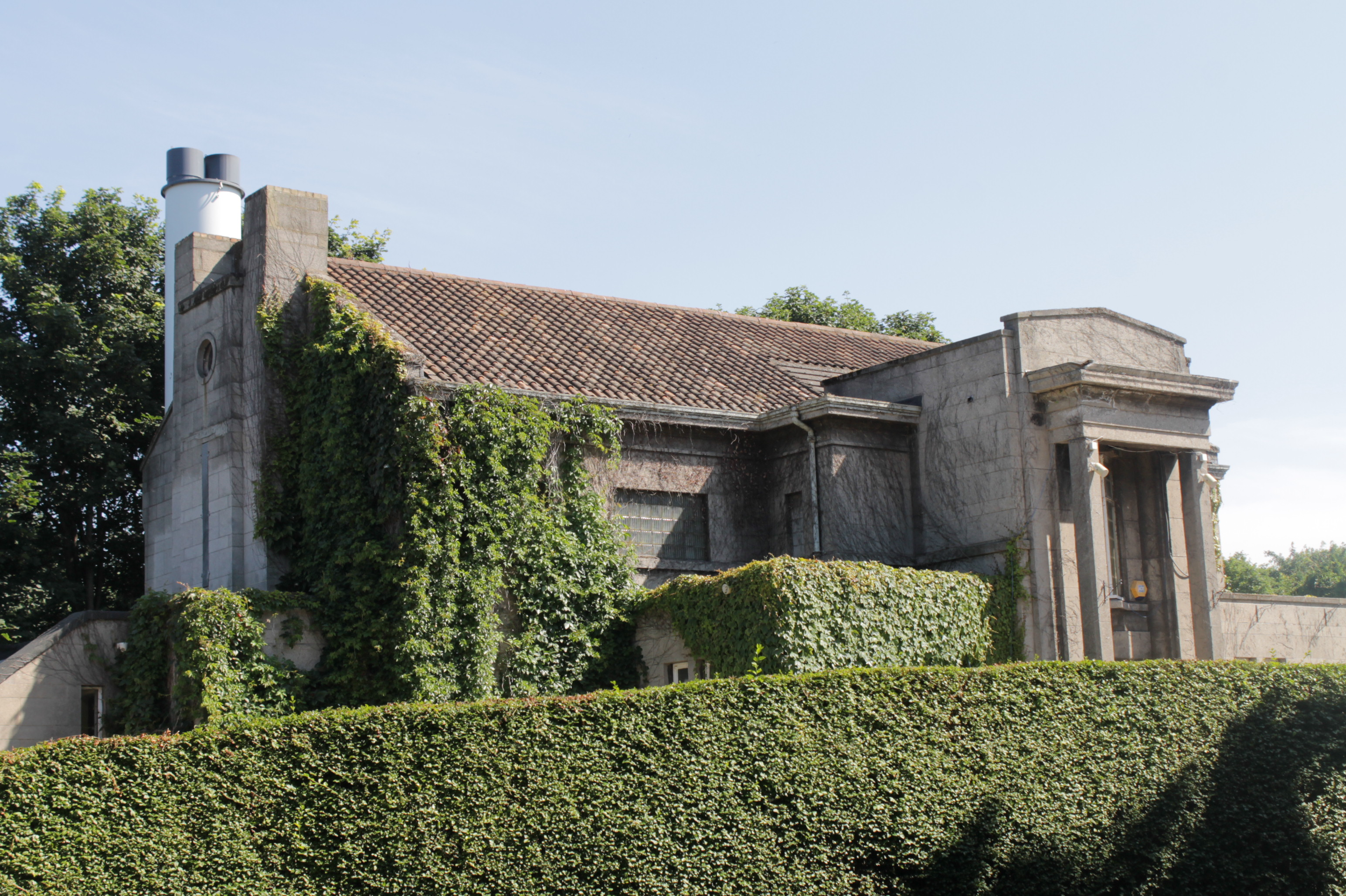
Seafield Crematorium

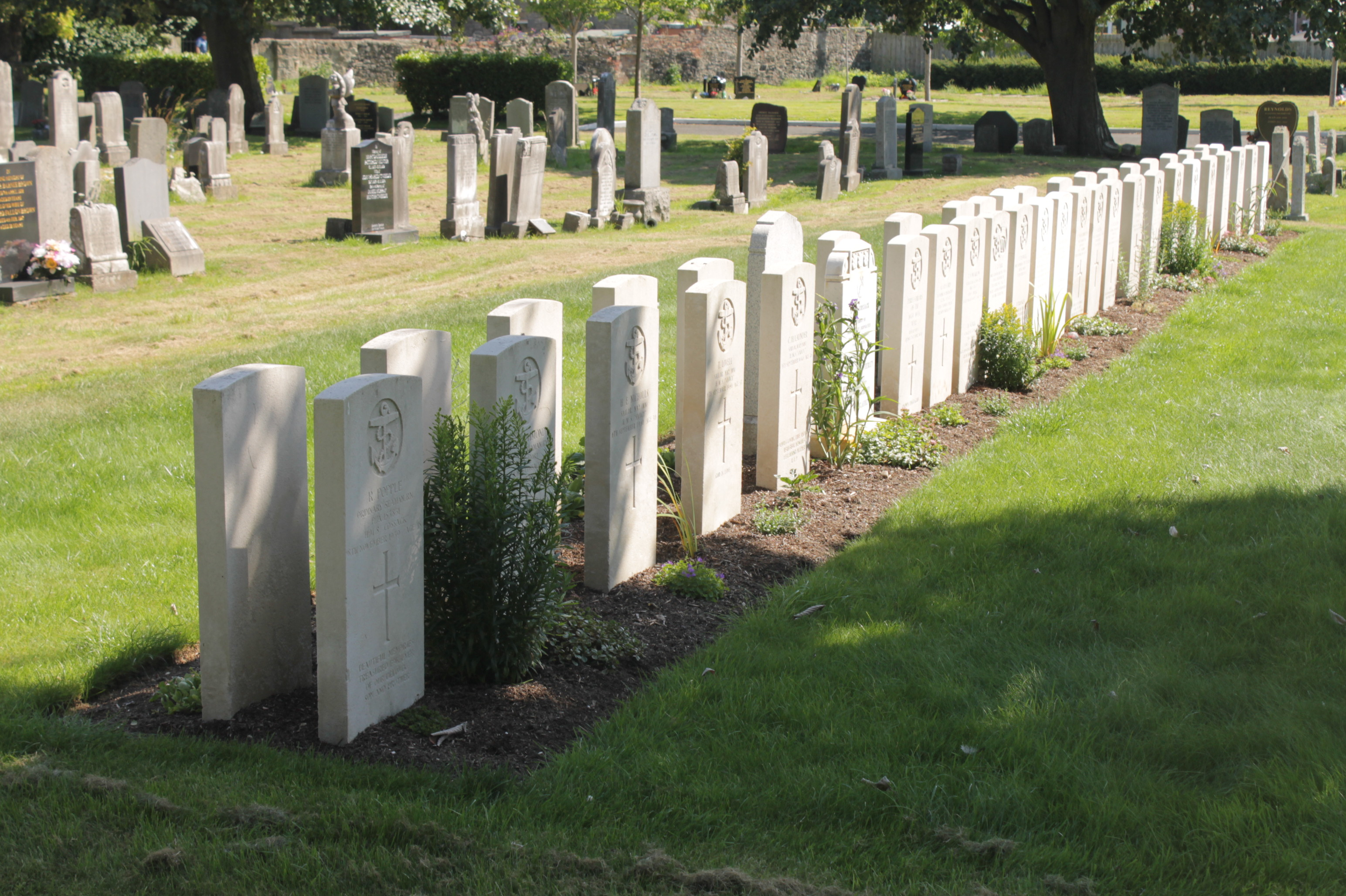
Naval war grave section in Seafield Cemetery

Dating from 1889 the cemetery has an impressive entrance lodge and gates in the style of Kinross House. The crematorium dates from 1938 and was designed by the Leith architect W. N. Thomson. The cemetery has a columbarium and Italian style section to the south. There are few notable monuments or interments:

- Bernard Hunter, businessman
- Thomas Bernard Mouat surgeon and medical author
- Robertson Fotheringham Ogilvie FRSE pathologist
- Rev David Brown Spence, missionary
- Raimondo Nicolo de Pinto and John James de Pinto, Greek consuls
- Alex Young (1880-1959) footballer (the previously unmarked grave had a stone placed by Everton Heritage Society in January 2017.

There are a high number of war graves, partly due to the cemetery's proximity to the Eastern General Hospital, which served as a military hospital during the Second World War. There are also a number of trawlermen buried in war graves, due to the government conscripting both boats and crews to serve in mine clearance duties during the First World War. The crews were officially part of the Royal Navy Reserve during this period. Here are buried 185 Commonwealth service personnel of the First World War, some buried in the Military Plot in Section B or the Admiralty Plot in Section M, otherwise scattered throughout the cemetery. Those whose graves could not be marked are listed on a Screen Wall memorial. There 104 service personnel from the Second war, including 5 unidentified sailors, many buried in a plot in Section P, facing which is a memorial to 22 service personnel of the latter war cremated at the crematorium. A group of Canadian war graves lie close to the main entrance including two members of the Canadian Forestry Corps. Robert Pringle of the 7th Royal Scots was killed in the Gretna Disaster.

Several naval graves hide deeper sadness as each represents either someone dying from wounds or disease, often far from home, or bodies washed up on the shores of the Firth of Forth:-

- Radio Operator Glyndwr B Brown (1920-1941) died if wounds sustained on SS Dalemoor when she was captured by German forces June 1941.
- O/s W. H. Clarke (1921-1939) 18 year old who died of wounds received on HMS Cossack.
- S/Lt C Dobson, C L Baldwin, Lt D B Johnstone (in command), all from HMT Firefly a trawler converted to minesweeper destroyed by a loose British mine in Firth of Forth on 3 February 1940
- A/s G. Gray killed in a torpedo attack by a U-boat on his ship SS Malvina of Flamborough Head on 2 August 1918
- Fireman J. Henderson died 9 January 1919 following an attack on his ship SS Northumbria
- Hendrik V D Hoogh (1900-1944) Dutch seaman from Dordrecht
- Seaman Willem Adriaan Staalenburg (1924-1940) from Pijnacker in the Netherlands, 16 year old, died of wounds received in North Sea, and Hermanus Natzijl (1890-1940) from Rotterdam and served on the same ship
- Seven crew of HMS Saucy, David Llewellyn Thomas, S J R Piper, C L M Harvey, D F Philips, mainly from Brixham, a Rescue tug and minesweeper blown up by a mine in Firth of Forth on 4 September 1940
- A/s C E J Ricketts of Barrage Vessel 42 and A/s E Murt of HMS Flint Castle killed by an accidental explosion in Leith Docks on 22 December 1943
- Five men killed in November 1939 due to the collision of HMS Cossack and SS Borthwick in the Firth of Forth

== Seafield Waste Water Treatment Works ==
Located on the northern side of the A199 is the Seafield Waste Water Treatment Works (WWTW), the largest waste water treatment works in Scotland. Operated by Scottish Water, this facility processes 300 million litres of waste water every day (enough to fill 121 Olympic-sized swimming pools), with sufficient future capacity for a population of 850,000 people. There is also a Combined Heat and Power plant and Thermal Hydrolysis to generate up to 2300 kilowatts of sustainable electricity from waste gases, enough to power up to 600 homes, as well as treating the residual waste for agricultural use. Also located on the site is Veolia Water Outsourcing Ltd.

The scheme was developed in the late 1960s following increasing control of estuarine pollution. The topography of Edinburgh meant that various sewage systems had been developed, with nine discharge points into the Forth Estuary between Crammond and Joppa. Two gravity interceptor sewers were constructed close to the coast, with seven pumping stations near the existing outfalls. The western sewer is 10.25 km (6.37 mi) long, increasing in diameter from 1.4 to 3.1 m (4 ft 7 in to 10 ft 2 in), while the eastern sewer is 5.13 km (3.19 mi) long and 0.7 to 2.3 m (2 ft 4 in to 7 ft 7 in) diameter. The treatment works was constructed on reclaimed land at the eastern end of the Port of Leith, with most of the site being above low water springs. The treated effluent is discharged into the Forth via a 2.8 km (1.7 mi) long outfall, with 20 diffuser pipes in the last 760 m (2,490 ft). Until 1998, sludge from the facility was dumped at sea by the specially constructed vessel MV Gardyloo.

Although a multi-million pound Odour Improvement Plan was instigated in 2012, in 2021 a further £10 million investment in improved sludge storage commenced following numerous complaints from local residents regarding strong odours emanating from the facility. Scottish Water has committed to redeveloping the facility after 2030.
