= Robertson Fotheringham Ogilvie =

Robertson Fotheringham Ogilvie FRSE (1 September 1904 – 17 May 1966) was a 20th-century Scottish physician, pathologist and expert in the field of diabetes mellitus.

== Life ==
He was born in Edinburgh on 1 September 1904 the son of Jeannie Robertson and James Ogilvie.

He was educated at Leith Academy. He then studied medicine at the University of Edinburgh graduating with an MB ChB in 1928. He immediately began lecturing at the University under Prof. Lorrain Smith and Alexander Murray Drennan. From 1930 he was additionally the Pathologist at Edinburgh Royal Infirmary. He gained his doctorate (MD) in 1932 and in 1939 became Senior Pathologist. In the University he became a Reader in Pathology in 1954.

In 1944 he was elected a Fellow of the Royal Society of Edinburgh. His proposers were Edwin Bramwell, Andrew Fergus Hewat, David Murray Lyon, and Charles McNeil.

He died on 17 May 1966 in Czechoslovakia while attending a conference on diabetes in Prague. His body was returned to Scotland and he is buried with his parents in Seafield Cemetery in north Edinburgh.

== Family ==
He was married to Anna Margaret Clark.

== Publications ==
- Pathological Histology (1940) with several reprints
- Experimental Glycosuria (1952)
- Histopathology (1962)
