= Fireflies (computer graphics) =

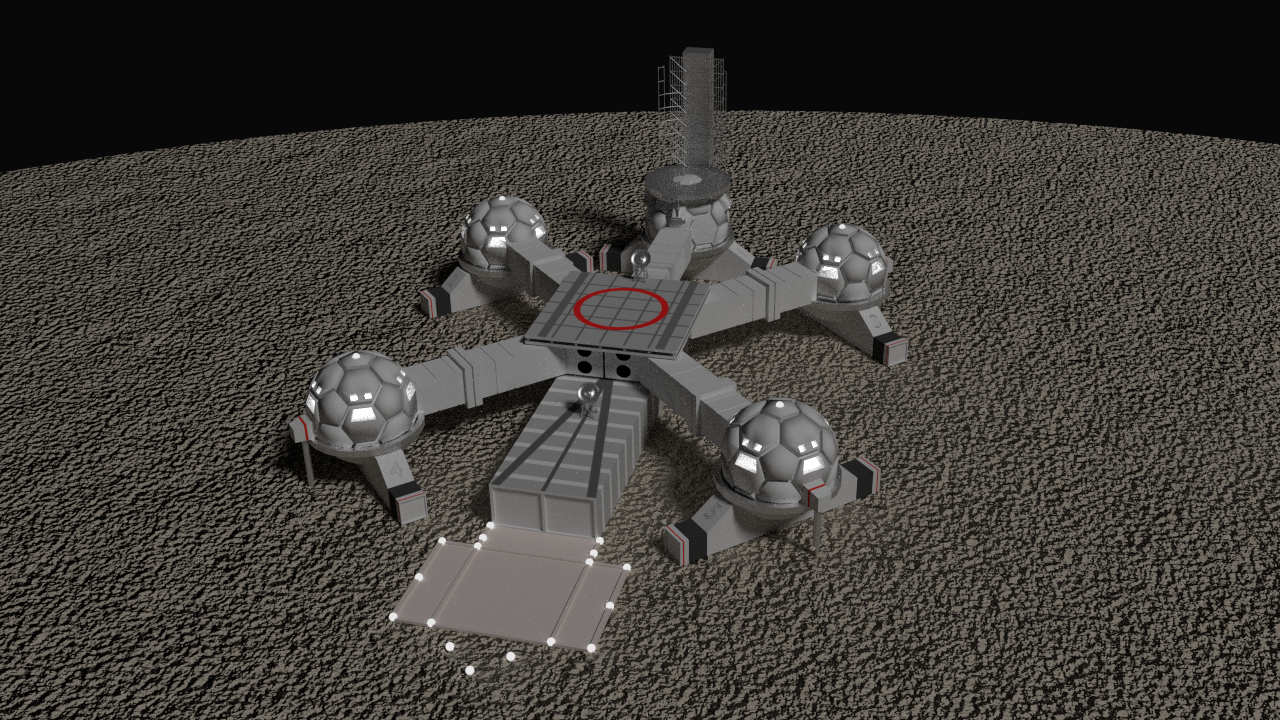
Example image with fireflies (click to enlarge and examine closely).

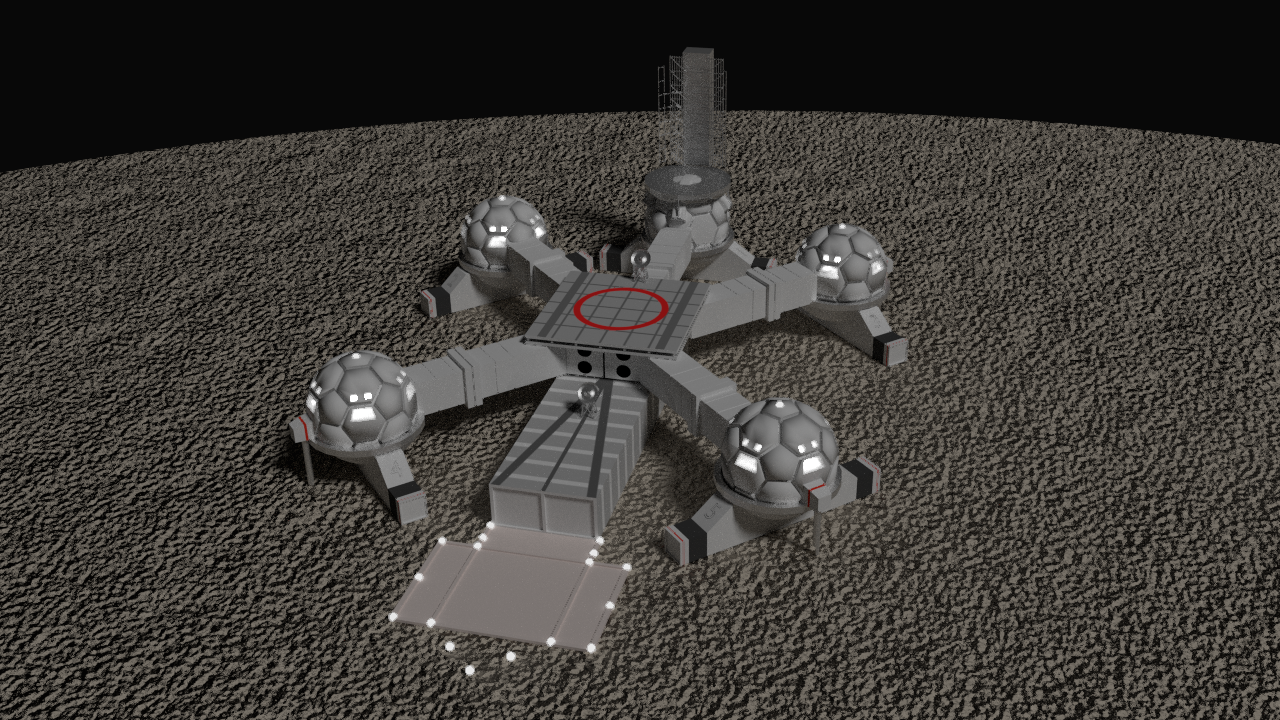
Image with fireflies removed through postprocessing.

Fireflies are rendering artifacts resulting from numerical instabilities in solving the rendering equation. They manifest themselves as anomalously-bright single pixels scattered over parts of the image.

Fireflies need to be distinguished from noise (overall graininess in the image), which can be reduced by simply increasing the number of rendering samples (amount of computation) per pixel. Fireflies tend to be harder to get rid of.

Fireflies tend to be confined to particular parts of the image, where they are caused by interactions between particular material and lighting settings that only affect certain objects in the scene.

== Curing Fireflies ==
Sometimes fireflies can be reduced by various tweaks to renderer settings, for example clamping the maximum intermediate amplitude during pixel calculations, or disabling the calculation of caustics if these are not needed. Another option is application of a despeckle filter as part of rendering post-processing, or manually removing the fireflies with the brush or clone tool in an image editor.
