= Michelle Shaprow =

American singer-songwriter

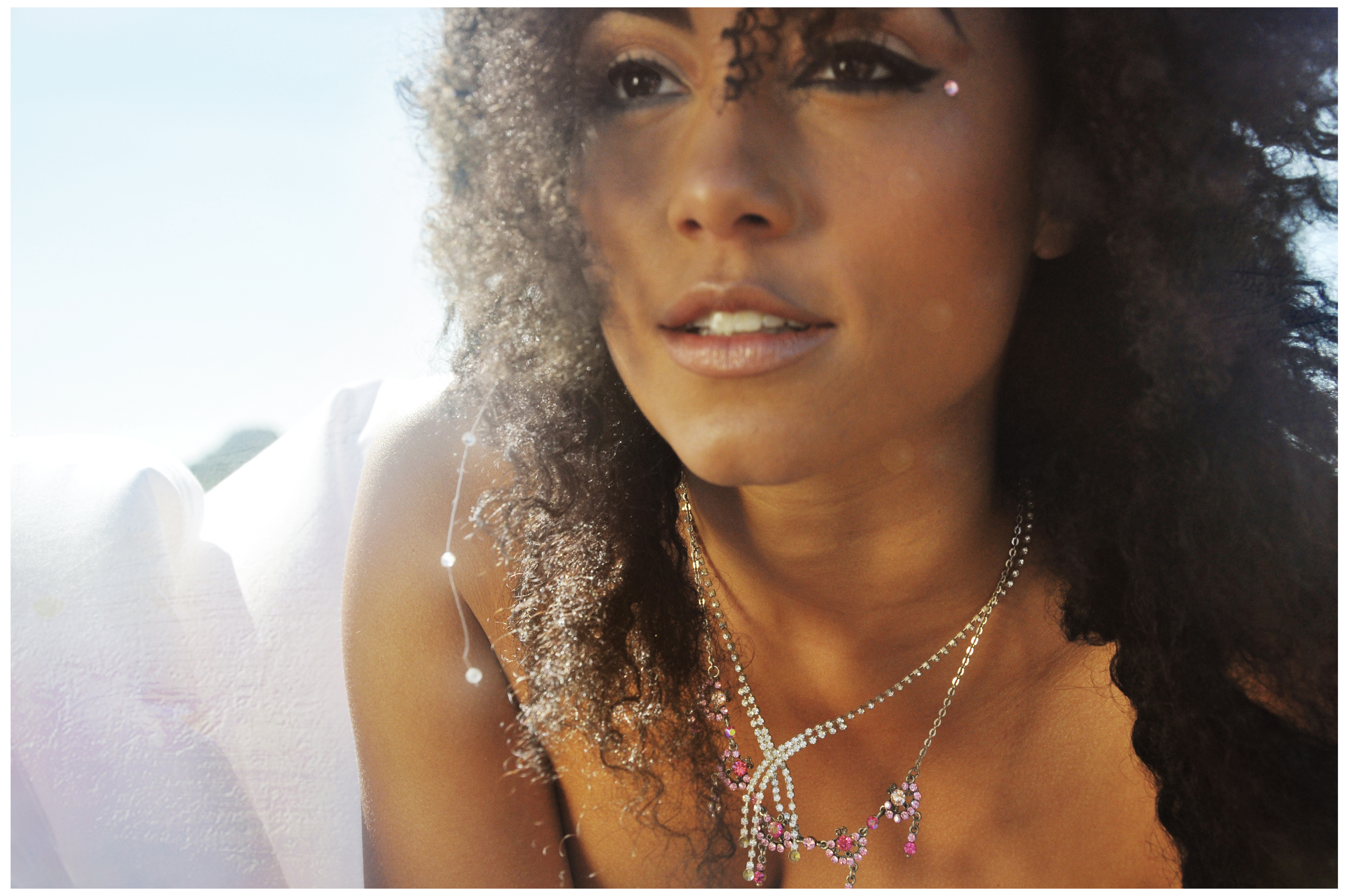

Background information
- Born: Michelle Shaprow
- Instruments: Voice, Piano
- Years active: 2010-present

Michelle Shaprow (SHAP-row) is an American dance pop and jazz singer and songwriter. She has released three albums.

== Music career ==
Shaprow recorded her debut album “Purple Skies” with Grammy-nominated producer Alex Eleña and Joshua Valleau. The album spent 5 weeks on a Japanese album chart. She recorded her second album “Earth One” with Alex Elena and Topher Mohr.

=== Reception ===
“Purple Skies” was selected as one of the best albums of 2011 in Japan's "iTunes Rewind". Her songs reached the top 10 pop charts in Korea's most popular digital malls. Michelle's single "If I Lost You" reached number 1 on BBC London 94.9 FM, charted on Gille’s Peterson’s Top 20 List and L.A.’s KCRW and played regularly as promotional theme music for VH1. “Back Down to Earth” became the most requested songs on Botswana's Yarona FM.

Shaprow has had hits in several genres: her dance music collaboration with Speakerboxx, “Time”, reached #5 on the Billboard dance charts and was nominated for an International Dance Music Award in the dance pop category. Pre-released versions of her songs appeared on the iTunes Store Top 100 Jazz singles chart in the U.S., Germany and Greece, Australia, Canada, Greece and Mexico.

Her music plays regularly at Abercrombie and Fitch, Hollister, H&M, Gilly Hicks, Barnes and Nobles, Wet Seal, BodyShop, Forever 21, EasySpirit, Arden B, Wilson's Leather, Applebee's, and Stylish Sophistication stores around the world and has been featured on VH1, TLC and Discovery Channel. Shaprow also appeared in a Coca-Cola commercial.

=== Social media ===
Shaprow uses social media in marketing music and connecting with fans. In 2011, Shaprow created personalized songs with individualized messages for selected fans. In the same year, music industry blog Hypebot profiled Shaprow in a feature discussing her innovative use of social media platforms. Her music has appeared in several of YouTuber Michelle Phan's videos. HMV Japan refers to Shaprow as ""iTunes 世代の歌姫"--“Diva of the iTunes generation"".

In 2011 she signed a worldwide publishing deal with BMG. To celebrate the signing she created a video thanking her Facebook fans. The video was featured on Facebook's official music page and industry blog Hypebot.

== Personal life and education ==
Shaprow was born in El Paso, Texas. She studied media perception, cognition, psychology and philosophy at Yale University, While at Yale she released music on Warner Brothers Records, Om Records, Ministry of Sound and King Britt's FiveSix label.

== Discography ==
=== Albums ===
- Purple Skies – 2011
- Starlight (with Astro Bits) – 2011
- Earth One – 2014
