= Nina Vidal =

American singer-songwriter

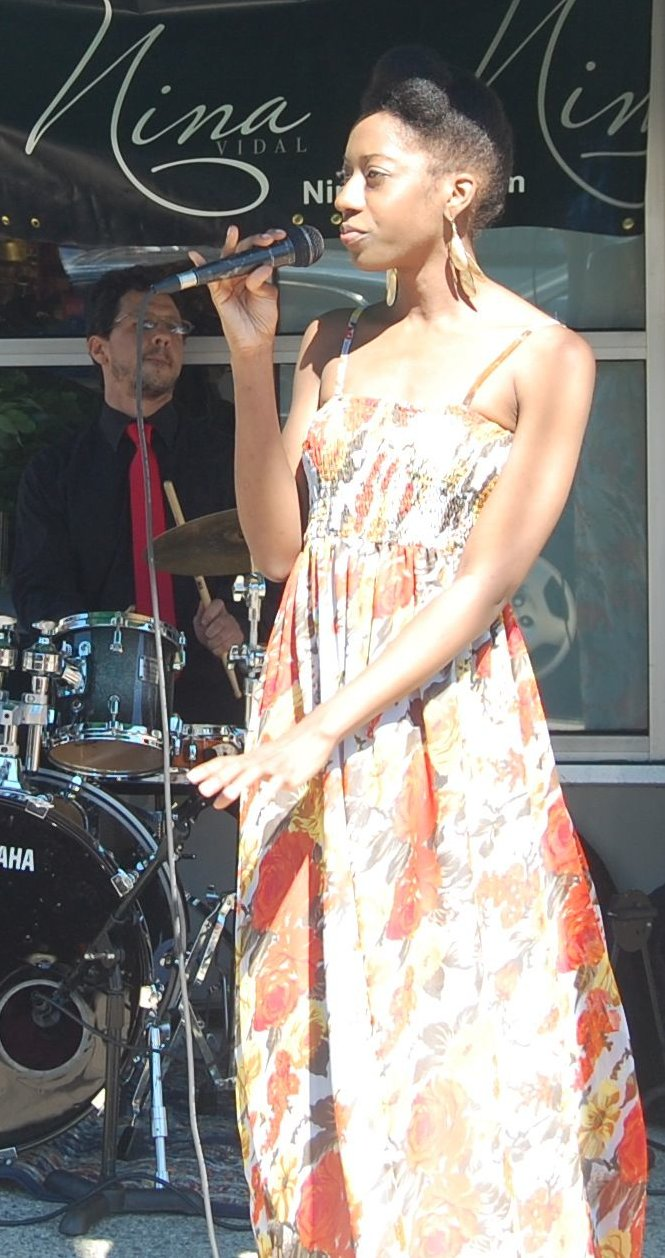

Background information
- Genres: Contemporary Vocalist, Contemporary Jazz, Soul, Pop, World
- Occupations: Singer-songwriter, pianist, arranger
- Years active: 2004–present
- Labels: Village Again, VAA Urban, Sweet Mimosa, CCG Recordings,
- Website: www.ninavidal.com

Nina Simone Vidal (born April 20), is an American singer-songwriter and pianist known best by her stage name, Nina Vidal.

In 2008, Vidal released her self-titled debut album, which gained her success in Japan. Within six days of the release, Nina Vidal became the most downloaded album on Japanese iTunes. From there, the album went on to become the number 1 Contemporary Jazz Album in Japan, with five of Vidal's songs on the top 10 most downloaded Jazz songs on iTunes.

In 2010, Nina Vidal released the singles "Cigarette & Wine" and the Paul McCartney written song "My Love" on iTunes. The singles were songs taken from her second full-length album, The Open-Ended Fantasy which was released in September 2010, and also became the No. 1 Jazz album in Japan.

In July 2011 an album of cover songs entitled Love, Pop & Soul (The Cover Session Vol. 1) was released and hit the No. 1 spot as well.

In first week of September 2013, Vidal's self-titled debut Nina Vidal once again became the No. 1 Jazz Album in Japan. Simultaneously her album The Open Ended Fantasy became the No. 6 Jazz album in the country that same week giving her two albums in the Top Jazz Albums for the month of September. The Nina Vidal debut album also peaked at No. 25 for the Top 200 albums in the country.

Nina Vidal's album Silver Lining was released in November 2013, and not only became the No. 1 Jazz album in Japan, but also broke Vidal's previous records with 8 of the 11 songs on the album included in the top 200 singles in the country.

On March 26, 2016, the album Best Of Nina Vidal was released by Village Again in Japan and included one new original song called "It's Time". The album became Vidal's seventh consecutive release to reach No. 1 on the iTunes Jazz chart.

== Music career ==
Vidal was born in Queens, New York. While a student at New York University, she attended a monthly open-mic night. On one such occasion she met musician, producer and composer Caté. Vidal passed her demo on to him and after hearing it Caté agreed to produce some of her songs. These songs would later be put together in an EP, entitled Do It Again.

Vidal was soon contacted by the Japanese label Uni-Village. Executives had heard her songs and wanted to sign her on their label for a full album.

In 2008, Uni-Village released Nina Vidal, which received extraordinary praise. The Soul Express (Finland) called it "A timeless masterpiece!" Adam Greenberg of Allmusic.com wrote that, "Nina Vidal takes her inspiration from a wide array of classic female singers…she breaks loose with a subdued, smoldering style."

Vidal's first album toppled Norah Jones Come Away With Me as the number one Contemporary Jazz album in Japan – a spot Vidal would hold for eight months straight. It also became the number 1 most downloaded album on Japanese iTunes in September of that year, and five of its tracks made it to the Japanese Top 10 most downloaded Jazz songs. She was only 25 years old.

On September 15, 2010, Vidal's album The Open-Ended Fantasy was released exclusively in Japan. It became the No. 1 Contemporary Jazz Album in that country in less than 24 hours. It had five songs on iTunes Japan Top Ten Jazz Singles simultaneously including the No. 1 single "Cigarette & Wine" which was written by Vidal. The album was released in the U.S. the following year.

In 2010, Vidal signed a Publishing deal with Universal Music Japan.

In July 2011, Vidal released Love, Pop & Soul (The Cover Session Vol. 1) on the Japanese label Village Again. An album of cover songs she has again worked with her partner and producer, Caté. On July 28, 2011, it reached the No. 1 position on iTunes Japan and became Vidal's 3rd consecutive album to reach number 1 in Japan.

In August 2011 The Open Ended Fantasy was released in Korea with two songs from the album, the Paul McCartney written "My Love" and Vidal's original composition "Cigarette & Wine", charted on the Korean Soul chart reaching the No. 5 and the No. 8 spot respectively.

In first week of September 2013, Vidal's self-titled debut Nina Vidal once again became the No. 1 Jazz Album in Japan. Simultaneously her album The Open Ended Fantasy became the No. 6 Jazz album in the country that same week giving her 2 albums in the Top Jazz Albums for the month of September. The Nina Vidal debut album also peaked at No. 25 for the Top 200 albums in the country.

On September 11, 2013, Vidal released the single "Paint The Sky". The single reached #1 on iTunes Japan on November 14, 2013.

Her next album Silver Lining was released in Japan on November 6, 2013. The album is a blend of jazz, world, soul and pop music and prominently features pedal steel guitar and harmonica. Vidal wrote nine out of the 11 songs on the album. The album was again produced by Caté. On October 23, 2013. In less than 12 hours it became the No. 1 Jazz Album in the country. 10 of the 11 songs from the album charted in the Top 100 Jazz Singles in a 4-day period.

On December 18, 2013, Village Again & CCG Recordings released the album Covers in Japan. It became the No. 1 Jazz Album in less than three hours giving Vidal her sixth No. 1 album and her second No. 1 album in 2 months.

On March 26, 2016, Village Again released the album ’Best Of Nina Vidal. The album featured one new song called "It's Time" written and produced by Vidal. It reached No. 1 album on iTunes Jazz Album chart in Japan in less than 5 hours making it her seventh consecutive No. 1 album in eight years.

== Recognition in Japan ==
More commercial success was found by Vidal in Asia compared to her home country of the USA. Having released her first album through the label of Uni-Village Records in 2004, Vidal became the top of Japanese Billboard chart and made herself known in Japan, Singapore, Philippines and many other parts of Asia.

== Personal life ==
A frequent traveler to Asia and Europe, Vidal currently resides either in New York City and Spain.

== Sound and influences ==
Vidal is influenced by Soul, Jazz, and World music. She has been compared to: Jeff Buckley, Tracy Chapman, Amos Lee, Lizz Wright, Djavan, Nina Simone, Anita Baker, Sade, Antonio Carlos Jobim, and Fiona Apple.

== Collaborations ==
On her albums, Vidal collaborates with such artists as Lonnie Plaxico, Jean Caze, Jeff Haynes, Lee Hogans, and Jody Redhage.

She was the featured vocalist on the song Moon Child by Japanese artist Kenichiro Nishihara.

Vidal has collaborated with producer/composer Caté on most of her recorded work.

== Discography ==
=== Albums ===
- Nina Vidal Live Session EP – iTunes Japan Exclusive – Village Again (Japan) 2008
- Nina Vidal – Sweet Mimosa Music (US) 2007, Village Again (Japan) 2008
- The Open-Ended Fantasy – Sweet Mimosa Music (US) 2011, Village Again (Japan) 2010
- Best Female Jazzy Tunes – Best Female Jazzy Tunes – Village Again 2010
- Love, Pop & Soul (The Cover Sessions Vol. 1) – CCG Recordings (US) 2011, Village Again (Japan) 2011

=== Compilation albums ===
- Ram Cafe Vol.3 Lounge & Chillout – Driving – Magic Records (Poland) 2008
- Addicted To House – Why- Single 7 – SoulStar (Germany) 2008
- Absolute Voices – Driving – S2S (Singapore) 2009
- Luv U 100% – Reggae Female Vocal Collection -Village Again (Japan) 2009
- True Soul Sistas – Moving Along – Soul UK (Britain) 2009
- Life – Moon Child – Kenichiro Nishihara – Unprivate (Japan) 2010

=== Singles ===
- "Cigarette & Wine" – Sweet Mimosa Music/CCreatives (US)2010 – Village Again (Japan) 2010
- "Paint The Sky" – Village Again (Japan) 2013
