= Firefly (mobile phone) =

Mobile phone designed for children

- Manufacturer: Firefly Mobile
- Type: Bar Phone
- Availability by region: 16 November 2005
- Compatible networks: GSM 850/1900, CDMA 800/1900 MHz
- Form factor: Bar
- Dimensions: 3.46 x 1.75 x 0.79 (88 x 44.5 x 20 mm)
- Weight: 2.12 oz (60 g)

The Firefly was a cellphone designed for children, introduced by Firefly Mobile in 2005. Targeted at parents seeking a simplified communication device for their kids, the phone featured a limited keypad with dedicated buttons for calling pre-programmed numbers. It lacked basic functions like texting and internet access.

== Features ==
The Firefly logo

The address book button has up to 20 phone numbers in it. These are to be programmed in by the guardian/parent, who knows a PIN which is intended to keep the child from changing the numbers. In this way, parents control who their kids are calling. The phone also offers a call screening option which, when activated only allows the numbers that are in the phone's memory to call that phone.

The standard features of the phone are up to 8.5 days standby time and up to 6 hours talk time. Texting and download capability are unavailable, which allows parents to manage phone costs.

Firefly cellphones are blue or pink transparent plastic and can be opened by gently pressing up on the transparent knob on the top of the back side. The screen is a small monochrome LCD, similar to the ones found in many calculators.

The various menus and sub-menus contain the signal strength and battery charge indicators. The menus are used in a similar fashion to setting a watch. Entering DTMF (Tones) can be done during the call by pressing the green key. Entering letters and numbers is accomplished by selecting each character and then confirming it, which moves the cursor to the next blank space – this can also be done easily via the website.

=== Layout ===
There are five main keys on the phone, along with several more secondary button:

- A "Begin Call" button (visualized by a green phone)
- An "End Call" button (visualized by a red phone)
- An "Address book" button (visualized by a blue open book)
- A "Call Mom" button (visualized by a blue woman-in-dress icon)
- A "Call Dad" button (visualized by a blue man icon)
- An emergency 9-1-1 button (visualized by small button with cross) (right side button)
- Two buttons to control the volume (visualized by two arrows) (left side button)
- An animation button which will display the animation set in the menu (left side button between the volume buttons)

== See also ==
- Verizon Wireless Migo, similar to the Firefly
- Jitterbug, a similar simplified phone designed for senior citizens.
