= Chris Garneau =

American singer-songwriter and musician (born 1982)

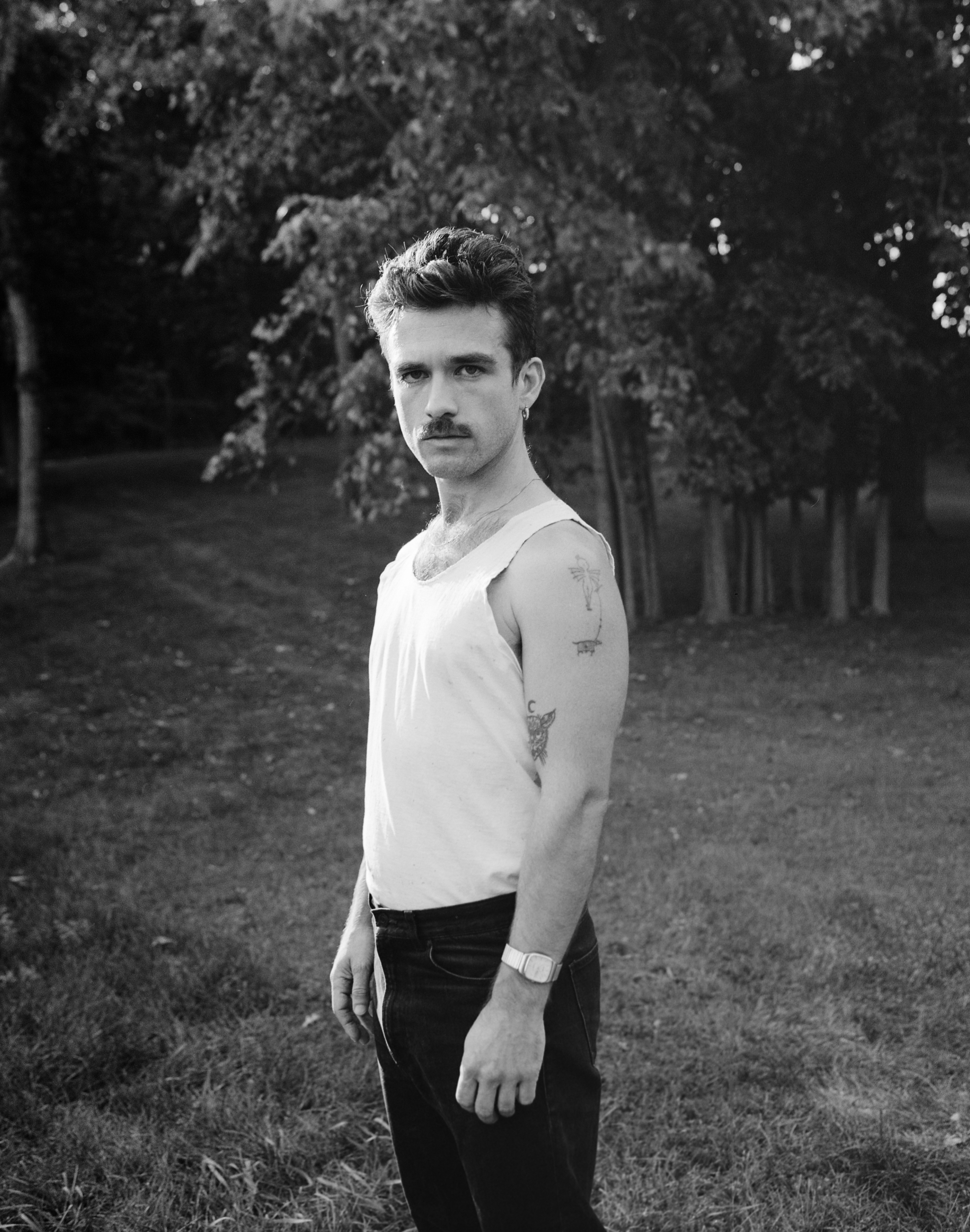
- Chris Garneau in 2020

Background information
- Born: Christopher Michael Garneau; November 5, 1982 (age 43); Boston, Massachusetts, United States
- Occupation: Singer-songwriter
- Instruments: Vocals; Piano; Guitar; Harmonium
- Years active: 2006–present
- Website: www.chrisgarneau.com

Chris Garneau (born November 5, 1982) is an American singer-songwriter and musician. Since releasing his debut album, Music for Tourists (2006), Garneau has toured throughout the United States, Canada, Brazil, Europe, and Asia.

He has released four more full-length studio albums, El Radio (2009), Winter Games (2013), Yours (2018), and The Kind (2021) as well as two EPs, C-Sides (2007) and Out of Love (2023).

Garneau cites Jeff Buckley, Nina Simone, Nico, and Chan Marshall as influences. The New Yorker has referred to Garneau's music as "fanciful and ornate compositions haunted with melancholia and a dreamlike innocence; his falsetto voice often dances over staccato piano notes accompanied by sorrowful violin and pastoral cello parts."

He currently resides in New York's Hudson Valley.

== Early life ==
Garneau, a native of Boston, lived with his family in Paris during grade school, and later New Jersey before moving to New York City. Garneau discovered a love of music at a young age while learning to play piano. Garneau participated in the Spring Awakening workshops and was cast in the Atlantic Theater Company's Broadway production. He opted out of the production to pursue his first record deal. After high school, Garneau briefly attended Berklee College of Music in Boston, but left after completing one term and moved to Brooklyn. There he began writing music and playing live shows at small venues in the East Village and Lower East Side of Manhattan, including CBGB's Gallery and the Living Room.

== Career ==
=== 2006-2008: Music for Tourists and El Radio ===
Garneau first signed with Absolutely Kosher Records, a California-based record label. He was brought to the label by Jamie Stewart and Caralee McElroy of Xiu Xiu. Garneau released his debut album Music for Tourists in October 2006. The Village Voice described it as "soft, honest, and wholeheartedly intimate."

The soundtrack to season four of TV's Grey's Anatomy includes Garneau's music. The episode "Love/Addiction" features his song "Castle-Time", and the episode "Forever Young" features the song "Black and Blue". The series premiere of Private Practice, "In Which We Meet Addison, a Nice Girl From Somewhere Else", features the song "Sad News".

In December 2007, he released an EP called C-Sides, which includes his cover of Elliott Smith's "Between the Bars". This song was later featured in Pedro Almodóvar's 2011 film The Skin I Live In.

In July 2009, he released his second album El Radio. The song "Dirty Night Clowns" has over 14 million streams on Spotify. The lyrics speak to how "nightmares from our past still invoke fear, [while] others have become less frightening once we get past our young interpretations."

=== 2011-2018: Winter Games and Yours ===
In 2011, Garneau left Brooklyn and moved upstate to a farm where he served as its caretaker. He lived on 40 acres and raised animals alone.

In 2013, he released his third studio album, Winter Games. He asked friends to write down their first memories of winter. These memories and his move to rural countryside in the winter subsequently informed his writing for the album. Out described it as "haunting, melancholic, and utterly spell-binding". Following the release, Garneau toured Europe, China, and North America.

In 2017, he premiered five new songs on stage as a quartet in New York City at Joe's Pub. He also scored dance pieces for choreographers such as Jonah Bokaer.

In November 2018, he released his fourth studio album Yours. After a two-year break from recording and touring, Garneau worked with his friend and bandmate Maxime Vavasseur to create the album. He wrote most of the material over the summer of 2016, reflecting on mass incarceration, industrialized slave labor, and mass extinction.

=== 2019-2021: The Kind and Out of Love ===
In January 2021, Garneau released his fifth studio album The Kind. He described the record as an exploration into childhood, queerness, the process of owning one's identity and casting off shame.

== Discography ==
- Music for Tourists (2006)
- C-Sides EP (2007)
- El Radio (2009)
- Winter Games (2013)
- Yours (2018)
- The Kind (2021)
- Out of Love EP (2023)
