= Firefly (Taiping Rebellion steamer) =

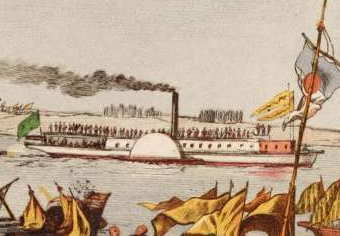
- Lithograph of Firefly under Taiping service, published in 1866

History

Ever Victorious Army
- Name: Firefly
- Launched: 1854
- Acquired: 1863
- Fate: Destroyed, 25 December 1864

History

Taiping Heavenly Kingdom
- Name: Ti-Ping
- Acquired: 15 November 1863
- Fate: Recaptured by Qing troops, 1864

General characteristics
- Class & type: Armed steamer
- Displacement: 502 long tons (510 t)

Firefly (Chinese: 飛而復來; pinyin: Fēiérfùlái; Wade–Giles: Fei Erh Fu Lai or Chinese: 飛來福; pinyin: Fēiláifú; Wade–Giles: Fei Lai Fu "flying come blessing") is an armed steamer of the Ever Victorious Army, who fought for the Qing Dynasty against the rebels of the Taiping Rebellion in 1860 to 1864. She was briefly captured by Taiping troops and renamed Ti-ping under their service.

== History ==
Firefly was an armed steamer of the Ever Victorious Army, purchased into the army in 1863 by Li Hongzhang. Under the command of one Captain Ludlam, she participated in the retaking of Kahpoo (Zhapu) on 27 July 1863 and Wokong (Wujiang) on 28 July 1863.

While moored in Shanghai, on 15 November 1863, Firefly was stolen by British adventurer Augustus Frederick Lindley. Lindley was offered £20,000 by the Taiping government for the steamer. At midnight, Lindley, along with around 30 Europeans, were guided on board by one of Ludlam's Cantonese servant. At that time, Firefly was "filled with ammunition" and was also carrying a 24-pounder gun intended to be installed on another ship, the Tsatlee. The quartermaster of Firefly managed to escape by jumping overboard, and brought the news to Ludlam. Also on board was four European crew of the Firefly: Dolly, Martin, Perry and Easton. Lindley promised to deliver the men as prisoner-of-wars to Ludlam, but their bodies were later found burnt and mutilated with signs of torture.

The theft and deaths were eventually reported to the British Prime Minister Lord Palmerston, who claimed that the men were "roasted to death" and used the incident as an example of the Taiping's cruelty. Lindley would later deny direct involvement in the men's deaths.

In any case, the steamer was presented to Li Xiucheng, put under the command of Lindley and renamed Ti-ping. With Ti-ping, the Taiping Army captured the town of Benniu in Changzhou. The steamer was recaptured by Qing forces in 1864, and subsequently destroyed in another battle in Changzhou on 25 December 1864.
