= Fire Flies =

American indie rock band

Background information
- Origin: New York, New York
- Genres: Indie rock
- Years active: 2002–2008
- Label: Asteroid B-612 Records
- Members: Dan Romer; Wil Farr; Matt Krahula; Seth Faulk
- Past members: Adam Christgau; Mike McGuire; Andrew Futral

Fire Flies were an American rock band from New York City. It was formed in 2002 in State University of New York at Purchase of Westchester.

== General information ==
Formerly the Baobabs, Fire Flies met and formed in the music department at SUNY Purchase. The group describes itself as a blend of David Bowie and The Flaming Lips with a hint of hip-hop added to the mix. They are known to have a penchant for singing about aliens and robots, and have a large following of loyal fans. Fire Flies recorded their first album, entitled Baobabs in the Basement, in their dorm room over the course of a semester, and released a more professionally recorded LP called Two New Sciences! in June 2007.

Their song "More Than This" is now being used on HBO promos.

In late 2008, the band decided to focus on other projects. However, they are all still working together in various capacities, and remain friends.

They also have re-recorded their music for the "Free Time" expansion pack of The Sims 2.

== Two New Sciences! ==
Two New Sciences! was officially released in June 2007. The band hosted a record release party at the club Crash Mansion in New York City's Lower East Side. At the release show, the group performed the new album in its entirety, including songs featuring a 20-member choir.

The band played songs from the album at their performances dating back as early as 2003. Live songs not included on Two New Sciences! include: "I Don't Love You," "Hard to Find," "God in Disguise," "Now is Never," "Work for Money," "Shining Through," "I Changed for You," "Until We're Gone" and "The Floor is Lava."

== Members ==
=== Final line-up ===
- Dan Romer – vocals, synthesizers, keyboards, Acoustic Guitar
- Wil Farr – Electric guitar
- Matt Krahula – Bass
- Seth Faulk – Drums

=== Other members ===
- Adam Christgau – drums (2002–2005)
- Mike McGuire – synthesizers, keyboards (2002–2004)
- Andrew Futral - synthesizers, keyboards (2004–2005)

== Discography ==
=== Albums ===
- Baobabs in the Basement
- Two New Sciences!
