= Fireflies Festival of Sacred Music =

The Fireflies Festival of Sacred Music, previously known as Bhoomi Jathre, is an annual music festival held at the Fireflies Ashram off Kanakapura Road, Bangalore.

== The festival ==
The festival stage is located under a banyan tree in an open-air amphitheatre next to a lake. The theme of the festival is the relationship of oneness between humans and the earth, and it is also a celebration of the pluralism of India. The music continues through the night and consists of various genres, mixing indigenous music and unknown performers with international acts. Genres represented include Carnatic and Hindustani vocal and instrumental, baul, fusion, western jazz, folk, and alternative music.

Each year the festival has a specific theme. For the first year of the festival, the theme was "Peace in Iraq"; the second year focused on the need to conserve water; the third year had the slogan "Protect and grow more trees"; and the fourth year focused on "the inner journey–The outer journey".
