= El Radio =

Studio album by Chris Garneau
- Released: July 7, 2009
- Genres: Indie pop, folk
- Label: Absolutely Kosher Records
- Producers: Saul Simon MacWilliams, Chris Garneau

Chris Garneau chronology
C-Sides (2007)	El Radio (2009)	Winter Games (2013)

El Radio (2009) is Chris Garneau's second full-length album, released on US label Absolutely Kosher Records, and European label Fargo Records, in July 2009.

== Critical reception ==
Pitchfork Magazine's online review of the album was negative, claiming there was a lack of "noticeable passion". Racket Magazine gave El Radio a 9/10, stating that while the album will not appeal to everyone, it deserves positive recognition.

== Track listing ==
1. "The Leaving Song"
2. "Dirty Night Clowns"
3. "Raw and Awake"
4. "Hands on the Radio"
5. "No More Pirates"
6. "Fireflies"
7. "Hometown Girls"
8. "Over and Over"
9. "The Cats & Kids"
10. "Les Lucioles en re Mineur"
11. "Things She Said"
12. "Pirates Reprise"
13. "Black Hawk Waltz"
