= Tamas Wells =

Australian singer-songwriter

- Origin: Australia
- Genres: Acoustic, soft rock
- Occupation: Singer-songwriter
- Instrument: Guitar
- Years active: 2002–present
- Labels: Inpartmaint (Japan), Pocket Records (China), Popboomerang (Australia)
- Website: tamaswells.com

Tamas Wells (/ˈteɪməs/ TAY-məs) is an Australian singer-songwriter and academic based in Melbourne, Australia. Wells first came to attention in his home country in 2002 with airplay of a three-track demo, Cigarettes, a Tie and a Free Magazine, recorded with three friends. They followed this up with an EP, Stitch in Time, the same year. The band took off in 2004 when they were spotted by record producer Tim Whitten and invited to record their debut album, A Mark on the Pane, with Popboomerang Records. Beginning that year, they performed five national tours.

In early 2006 Wells relocated to Rangoon, Burma, to participate in a community development project. The band's second album, A Plea en Vendredi, appeared later that year. In addition to the Australian release by Popboomerang, agreements were entered into with Inpartmaint and Pocket Records for the album to be released in Japan and China respectively. In August 2007, the band performed a sell-out tour of four Japanese cities. Wells' third album, Two Years in April was released in 2008, and was followed by tours of Australia, China, Japan and Singapore in 2009 and 2010. In 2010 Thirty People Away, his fourth album, was released and followed by a tour in China, Japan and France. He also released the 2015 album On the Volatility of the Mind and 2017 album The Plantation.

In 2012 he returned to Melbourne where completed a doctorate in Burmese politics at University of Melbourne where he now works as an academic. He writes on issues of Burmese democracy and political transition.

== Early years and career ==
Tamas Wells began playing the piano when he was aged about eight years, but disliked sitting for the examinations. He grew up listening to the music of the Beatles – for most of his teenage years the only album he owned was Sgt. Pepper's Lonely Hearts Club Band (1967) – though he says his music is not consciously influenced by them. After finishing school and moving to Melbourne, for his university education, he had a group of friends who played the guitar and wrote their own music. He also listened to Australian indie bands such as Art of Fighting and The Lucksmiths.

Wells first came to public attention in Australia in March 2002 when Cigarettes, a Tie and a Free Magazine, an acoustic demo with three tracks that he had recorded with three friends, began receiving airplay on independent radio stations and the national station triple J. This was followed up later that year by an EP, Stitch in Time. In 2004, songs recorded at home by Tamas Wells were heard by Australian record producer Tim Whitten. Whitten invited Wells and his friends to Sydney to record a debut album at Megaphon Studios. Released by Popboomerang Records as A Mark on the Pane on 30 March 2004, the album reached number 16 on Australia's AIR Charts. It was described by The Australian Financial Review as "Nick Drake's folk meeting up with Iceland's stately Sigur Rós". Beginning that year, the band performed five national tours.

Wells first went to Burma in 2004 for a short-term voluntary job. Appreciating the culture and finding the people very gracious and humble, he decided to move back there if the opportunity arose. In early 2006, Wells relocated to Rangoon with his wife Bronwyn and daughter Johanna to participate in a community health HIV/AIDS education project with World Concern Burma as associate fieldworkers of TEAR Australia, a Christian organization. Wells began recording songs for a new album using a guitar and a traditional Burmese banjo. The band's second album, A Plea en Vendredi, appeared later that year. In addition to the Australian release by Popboomerang, Wells also entered into agreements with Inpartmaint in Tokyo and Pocket Records in Beijing for the album to be released in Japan and China respectively. It subsequently reached number 16 in Japan's HMV Shibuya international chart. The band wanted to make the album "a little more homespun" so it used mandolins and out-of-tune pianos, and played the songs live rather than track by track; Wells also felt that "the vocals are more natural". The song Valder Fields from the album was named Single of the Week by Beat Magazine. Wells has said that the song "is a stream of consciousness that hints at the tension between a life of responsibility (being on time, applying for jobs) and a Leunig-esque life of contemplation (falling asleep on the warm concrete next to a fountain)" and that "giving oneself up to either one leads to a distortion of reality through either too much responsibility or not enough". In August 2007, the band went on to perform a sell-out tour of four Japanese cities.

Two Years in April was subsequently released in June 2008 by Popboomerang in Australia, Pocket Records in China and Inpartmaint in Japan. Wells was inspired by his feelings of isolation during his first two years in Burma. One reviewer said that Wells had shown "he has the songwriting stuff to capture an audience who, for the most part, may not be able to understand what he is singing but is drawn in by his infectious melodies and breathtaking arrangements. ... Wells has chosen to frame his on-point melodicism with a startingly fragile framework to put all of the emphasis on his songs. ... The melodies are sublime and Wells' choice in arrangements are near perfect." In conjunction with the album release, Wells toured Australia, China and Japan in 2009 and 2010, including an appearance at the M1 Singapore Fringe Festival on 23 January 2010.

The recording of Wells' upcoming fourth album was portrayed in the 15-minute documentary The Houses There Wear Verandahs Out of Shyness (2010) by Fabrizio Polpettini. The title of the film is a line from Les Murray's poem "Driving through Sawmill Towns" from the anthology Learning Human: Selected Poems (2000). In 2011, Fabrizio Polpettini made a video clip for the song Thirty People Away from the album of the same name. The film, which brings to the screen French actors Roxane Duran and Denis Lavant, was inspired by the character of the god Pan in the book "Jitterbug Perfume", by Tom Robbins.

Wells has been described as having "the type of voice that you assume could only come from spending your school years continually being beaten up behind the bike racks. It is an instrument so frail and timid yet stunning in its clarity whilst still holding a glimpse of some deeper inner strength." Wells has said that he does not write his music for a specific audience, but "[tries] to write things that I take pleasure in making – if certain groups of people like it then that's great but the audience is not the starting point".

== Discography ==
=== Albums ===
- A Mark on the Pane (2004)
- A Plea en Vendredi (2006)
- Two Years in April (2008)
- Thirty People Away (2010)
- On the Volatility of the Mind (2014)
- The Plantation (2017)

=== Extended play ===
- Stitch in Time (2002)

=== Singles ===
- Cigarettes, a Tie and a Free Magazine (2002)
- Valder Fields (2006, from A Plea en Vendredi)
