= Firefly Arts Collective =

Organization

Firefly
- Locations: Bethel, Vermont, United States
- Inaugurated: 2003
- Most recent: July 2 - July 7, 2024
- Participants: 2018: 1210. 2019: Approx. 1300.
- Website: fireflyartscollective.org

Firefly Arts Collective is an American non-profit organization that facilitates the annual New England regional burner festival 'Firefly'. Firefly is a regional event inspired by the annual Burning Man festival in Nevada. Firefly is held in Vermont typically during July 4 weekend. Most of the organizers and participants come from the Boston metropolitan area and surrounding states including Massachusetts, Maine, Rhode Island, Connecticut, New Hampshire, Vermont, and New York.

Firefly is a camping event that celebrates art for art's sake and espouses a gift economy where no vending, sales or barter are permitted. Visual and performance artists from all over the New England region and the East Coast create a temporary community for the weekend. Participants share a wide range of talents from sculpting, painting, music, theatre, and DJing, to alternative forms of expression such as games, performance art, and circus talents such as aerial silks, juggling, and fire spinning.

The event adheres to the ten principles of the Burning Man event in Nevada. Among these are the Leave No Trace philosophy, an environmental policy whereby participants are obligated to remove every piece of refuse that they generate while at the event, taking it with them when they leave. The themes of radical self-expression and radical self-reliance are also borrowed from Burning Man.

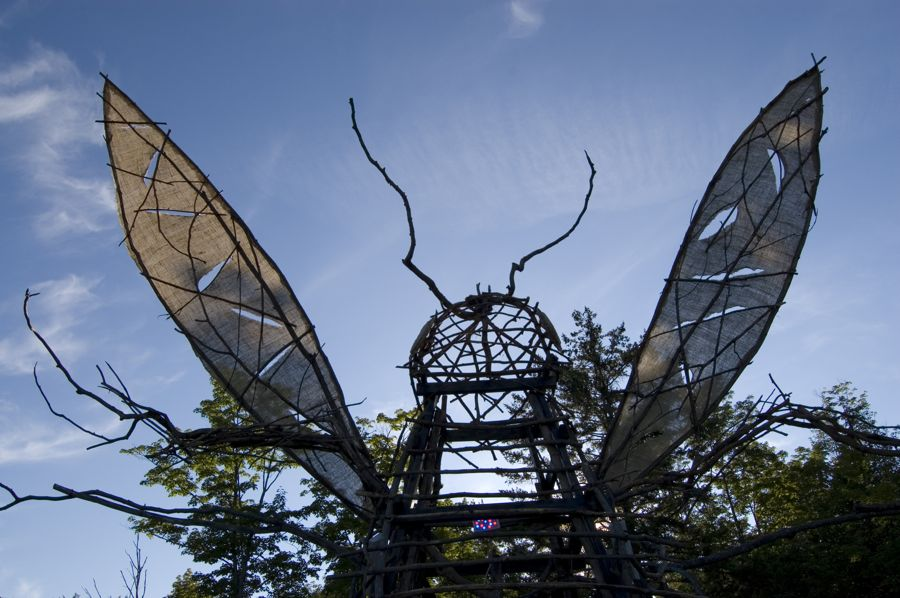
Firefly Effigy - July 2008

In addition, the event is considered a "no spectators" event, meaning that all attendees are expected to actively participate in its creation, staffing, and general philosophy.

According to the event's official website Firefly is, "A celebration of self-expression and community! Firefly is a participatory arts and music gathering in the woods of Vermont." The event is organized and run completely by volunteers. On the last night of Firefly a giant wooden Firefly is burned. In 2006 the Firefly included fireworks launched from its top.

== Weather ==
Firefly is held at the end of Vermont's mud and rain season. The road leading to the current event site is a dirt road that can become unnavigable by average vehicles due to mud.

== History ==
Firefly was started in 2003 by Boston burners. It was first held on NUHOC land in Shelburne, New Hampshire. Since 2009 it takes place in Vermont on a parcel of land owned by neopagan writer and Vermont state assembly member Kirk White.

=== Ticketing ===
- Tickets for the 2003 event were $15.00 each. There were 175 tickets sold.
- Tickets for the 2006 event were US$30.00 each, and were handled in one release of 350 tickets. When tickets were sold out a limited number of additional tickets were released. Members of music bands were also sold tickets outside of the initial release.
- Tickets for 2007 were sold for US$35 each. They were sold in a release of 400 and a lottery of 100.
- Tickets for 2008 were sold for US$40 each. They were sold in a release of 450 and then an additional 50 tickets were released.
- Tickets for 2009 were sold for US$40 each. They were sold in a release of 150, 300, and then an additional 50 more were released.
- Tickets for 2010 were sold for US$45 each. They were sold in three releases of 200.
- Tickets for 2012 were sold for US$75 each. A lottery system distributed tickets to pre-registered ticket seekers. A waitlist allowed ticket holders to sell their tickets at face value to the next person on the waitlist. Each ticket was uniquely matched to an individual's ID.
- Tickets for 2013 were sold for US$75 each. A similar lottery system was used again. 845 tickets were sold.
- Tickets for 2014 were sold to 950 people. 821 attended.
- Tickets for 2015 were sold to 835 people. 828 attended.
- Tickets for 2016 were sold for US$85 each. Parking passes were sold for $20 per car to encourage carpooling. A lottery system was used again. 1050 tickets were sold. 922 attended.
- Tickets for 2017 were sold for US$85 each. Parking passes were sold for $20 per car to encourage carpooling. A lottery system was used again. 1122 tickets were sold. 1030 attended.
- Tickets for 2018 were sold for US$85 each. Parking passes were sold for $30 per car to encourage carpooling. A lottery system was used again. 1290 tickets were sold. 1210 attended.
- In 2019, people paid what they were willing. Parking passes were $30 per car. A lottery system was used again, aiming for around 1300 participants.
