= Firefly Learning =

Education-technology company based in London, England

Firefly Learning Ltd
- Type: Private Limited Company
- Industry: Educational Software
- Founded: 2005
- Headquarters: London, United Kingdom
- Key people: Joe Mathewson; Founding Partner; Simon Hay; Founding Partner
- Products: Firefly student planner teacher planner parent portal
- Website: Firefly Learning

Firefly Learning is an educational technology company based in London, England with offices in Sydney that provides virtual learning platforms to hundreds of schools around the world. The Firefly platform allows teachers, students and parents to publish and access information from anywhere with an internet connection.

== Background ==
Firefly Learning was started in 2000 by Joe Mathewson and Simon Hay, two 15-year-old students, at St. Paul's School in London, who developed it during school holidays, after they became frustrated with the school's antiquated internet system. They developed the concept during lunch breaks at the physics labs and teachers at St. Paul's began using the system. Soon afterward, Forest School expressed interest in the new system.

In 2010, students at Wellington College stranded due to ash cloud grounding thousands of flights were able to continue with their lessons via an e-learning platform provided by Firefly Learning. In 2012 BETT nominated Firefly for an Innovation in ICT award for its development of the Student Planner iPad app that automatically updated students' planners with assignments assigned by the teacher.

Firefly has been named a BETT finalist every year since, and in 2014 won an innovation award in London.

In November 2016, Firefly raised $5.6 million (£4.5 million) Series A funding round from BGF Ventures (see Business_Growth_Fund) and Beringea. By that time, Firefly learning was used by 480 schools in 32 countries.

== Services ==
The cloud-based support platform used by Firefly allows teachers to set homework assignments, track students' progress, provide feedback and share learning resources, on it. The platform has desktop and mobile apps, it also has its own API for education software providers allowing the users to plug in their content.

== Issues ==
On 23 March 2020, high demand from schools and pupils working remotely due to the COVID-19 pandemic resulted in a severe Firefly overload, with many users experiencing slowdowns or complete outages.
