= HMT Firefly =

History

United Kingdom
- Name: Firefly
- Builder: Cook, Welton & Gemmell, Beverley
- Yard number: 552
- Launched: 23 August 1930
- Completed: 23 September 1930
- Acquired: September 1939
- Renamed: St Just in 1946
- Fate: Scrapped by 1 March 1961

General characteristics
- Displacement: 394 tons
- Length: 44.2 m pp
- Beam: 7.5 m
- Notes: Pennant number FY673

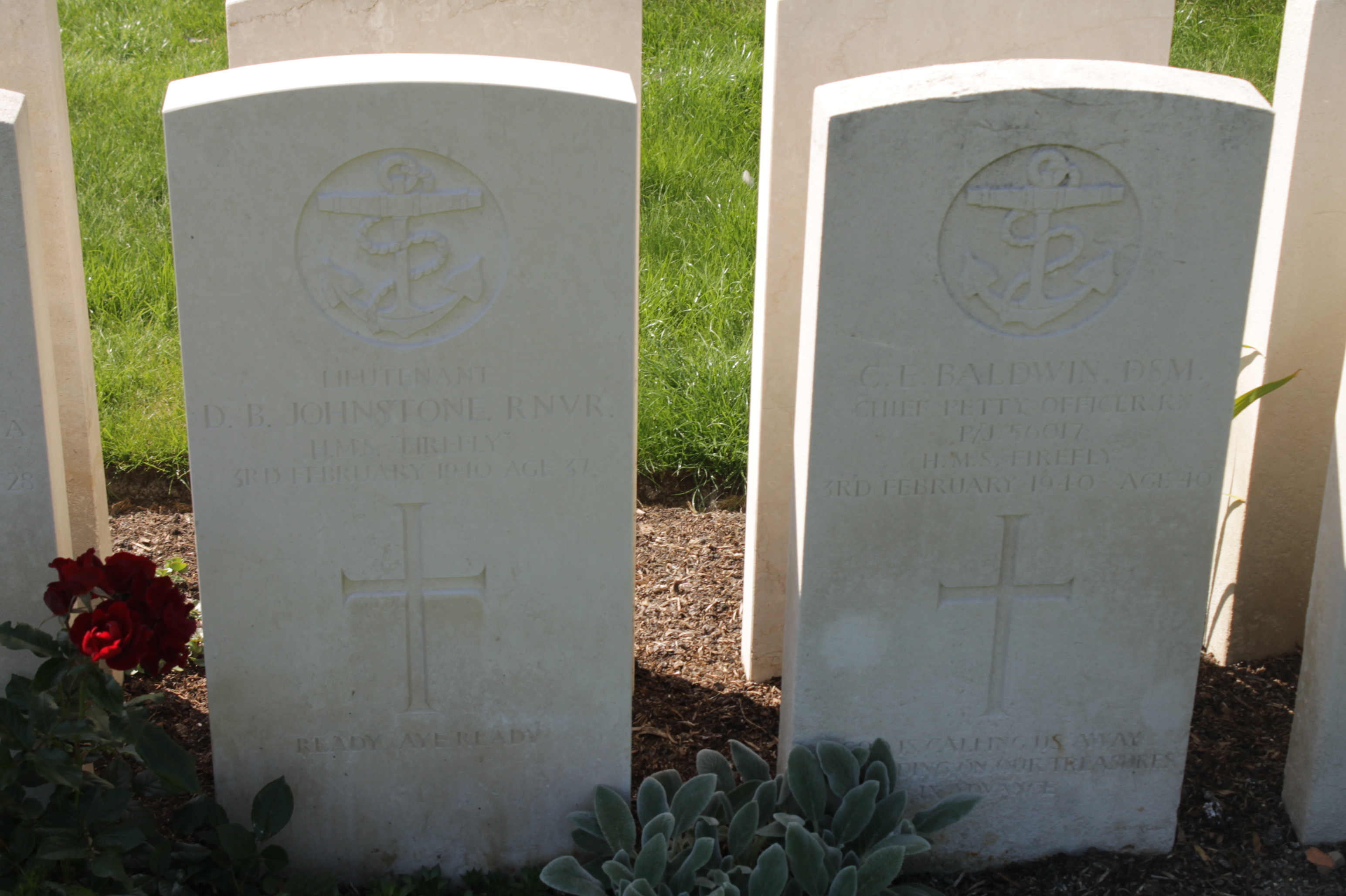
Two seamen killed on HMT Firefly, Seafield Cemetery, Edinburgh

HMT Firefly was a minesweeping trawler that saw service during the Second World War.

She was built as a trawler by Cook, Welton & Gemmell, of Beverley and launched on 23 August 1930. She was operated by the St Andrew's Steam Fishing Company Ltd, out of Hull.

== Royal Navy Service ==
The Admiralty requisitioned Firefly at the outbreak of war, at a monthly hire of £215, and commissioned her in September 1939. On 2 December 1939, together with fishing trawler Cardew, they rescued six of the crew of the Swedish cargo ship Rudolf, which had been torpedoed by submarine U-56.

On 3 February 1940, Lt D B Johnstone and his crew endeavoured to defuse a loose British horned mine in the Firth of Forth. Most men were standing on the rail on one side of the ship watching those in the ship's boat trying to corral the mine and bring it alongside. As they did this, a British destroyer went by at high speed and its bow wave caused one of the oars on the boat to touch a detonator spike on the mine. The resulting explosion destroyed the boat and injured or killed most of those watching. Only three men in the wheelhouse and one in the galley were uninjured. The explosion killed 13 men and a fourteenth died of his injuries two days later. The explosion killed 14 out of a crew of 18. Among those killed was Chief petty officer Baldwin who had defused the first magnetic mine recovered at Shoeburyness. The superstructure of the ship was destroyed but she did not sink. She was towed to Leith harbour by the minesweeper Wardour.

Three of the men killed are recorded as buried in Seafield Cemetery in north Edinburgh, three are buried in Buckie New Cemetery, two are buried in the Preston, Tynemouth cemetery, North Shields, with the others buried in Lossiemouth, Glasgow, Hartlepool, Cleethorpes, Great Yarmouth and Bournemouth.

After repairs and recommissioning, in June 1940 she formed part of Minesweeping Group 30 based at Nore Command in Yarmouth under command of Edward Axel Runnquist RNR. In September she was moved to Sheerness and in January 1942 was moved to Harwich. Whilst in the English Channel off Harwich on 17 February 1942, working with minesweepers Caswell and Stella Rigel, she was attacked by two enemy aircraft, but none were hit.

== Post War ==
The Admiralty returned Firefly to her original owners on 29 October 1945. She was renamed St Just H320 based in Harwich, and returned to her original designed function as a fishing trawler. She had been scrapped at Passage West, Ireland by 1 March 1961.
