= Alex Hutchings =

Alex Hutchings may refer to:

- Alex Hutchings (ice hockey)
- Alex Hutchings (guitarist)
