= NSRGNTS RMXS =

Remix album by Steven Wilson
- Released: 29 June 2009
- Recorded: 2009
- Genre: Trip hop, industrial rock, ambient, electronica
- Length: 38:19 (CD); 15:02 (vinyl); 48:47(digital)
- Label: Kscope
- Producer: Steven Wilson

Steven Wilson chronology
Insurgentes (2008)	NSRGNTS RMXS (2009)	Grace For Drowning (2011)

Professional ratings
Review scores
Source	Rating
Classic Rock	7/10 stars
Metal Hammer	7/10 stars

NSRGNTS RMXS (a shortening of the phrase Insurgentes Remixes, spelled without the vowels), is the name of a remix EP released by British musician, songwriter and music producer Steven Wilson, comprising remixes of his first full-length studio album, Insurgentes. The EP was released in CD and Vinyl formats with the track list varying to each one. It was available to order worldwide since 15 May 2009, and shipped on 29 June.

== Versions ==
=== CD edition ===
The CD edition consists of six tracks. The first is a version of the song "Harmony Korine" mixed by indie rock band TV on the Radio guitarist and programmer David Andrew Sitek, the second is a version of the song "Get All You Deserve" by American hip-hop duo Dälek, the third is the track "Abandoner" mixed by British dream pop band Engineers, the fourth is a mix of the track "Salvaging" by King Crimson drummer Pat Mastelotto, the fifth is occupied by the winner remix of the "Abandoner" remix competition by Łukasz Langa and the sixth track is an interpretation of "Get All You Deserve" by ambient musician Fear Falls Burning.

In the US, a limited special offer with an autographed booklet was distributed by Newbury Comics starting from 30 July 2009.

=== Vinyl edition ===
Differently from the CD edition, the 12-inch vinyl version includes the mix of "Harmony Korine" by David A. Sitek and two mixes of "Only Child" by Pat Mastelotto, and is limited to 1000 copies.

=== Digital edition ===
A digital edition was released on 7th September 2009, collecting all eight tracks from the CD and 12".

== Video competition ==
A video competition started on 6 June 2009, encouraging people to make a video for the David A. Sitek mix of "Harmony Korine" and a YouTube Channel was set up for that purpose.

== Track listing ==
=== CD ===
1. "Harmony Korine" (David A. Sitek mix) – 5:10
2. "Get All You Deserve" (Dälek mix) – 7:44
3. "Abandoner" (Engineers mix) – 4:46
4. "Salvaging" (Pat Mastelotto mix) – 8:31
5. "Abandoner" (Danse Macabre mix) – 5:33
6. "Get All You Deserve" (Fear Falls Burning mix) – 6:19

=== Vinyl ===
==== A-side ====
1. "Harmony Korine" (David A. Sitek mix) – 5:14

==== B-side ====
1. "Only Child" (Pat Mastelotto mix 3) – 4:32
2. "Only Child" (Pat Mastelotto mix 1) – 5:56

=== Digital ===
1. "Harmony Korine" (David A. Sitek mix) – 5:10
2. "Get All You Deserve" (Dälek mix) – 7:44
3. "Abandoner" (Engineers mix) – 4:46
4. "Salvaging" (Pat Mastelotto mix) – 8:31
5. "Abandoner" (Danse Macabre mix) – 5:33
6. "Get All You Deserve" (Fear Falls Burning mix) – 6:19
7. "Only Child" (Pat Mastelotto mix 3) – 4:32
8. "Only Child" (Pat Mastelotto mix 1) – 5:56
