= Steven Wilson =

English musician (born 1967)

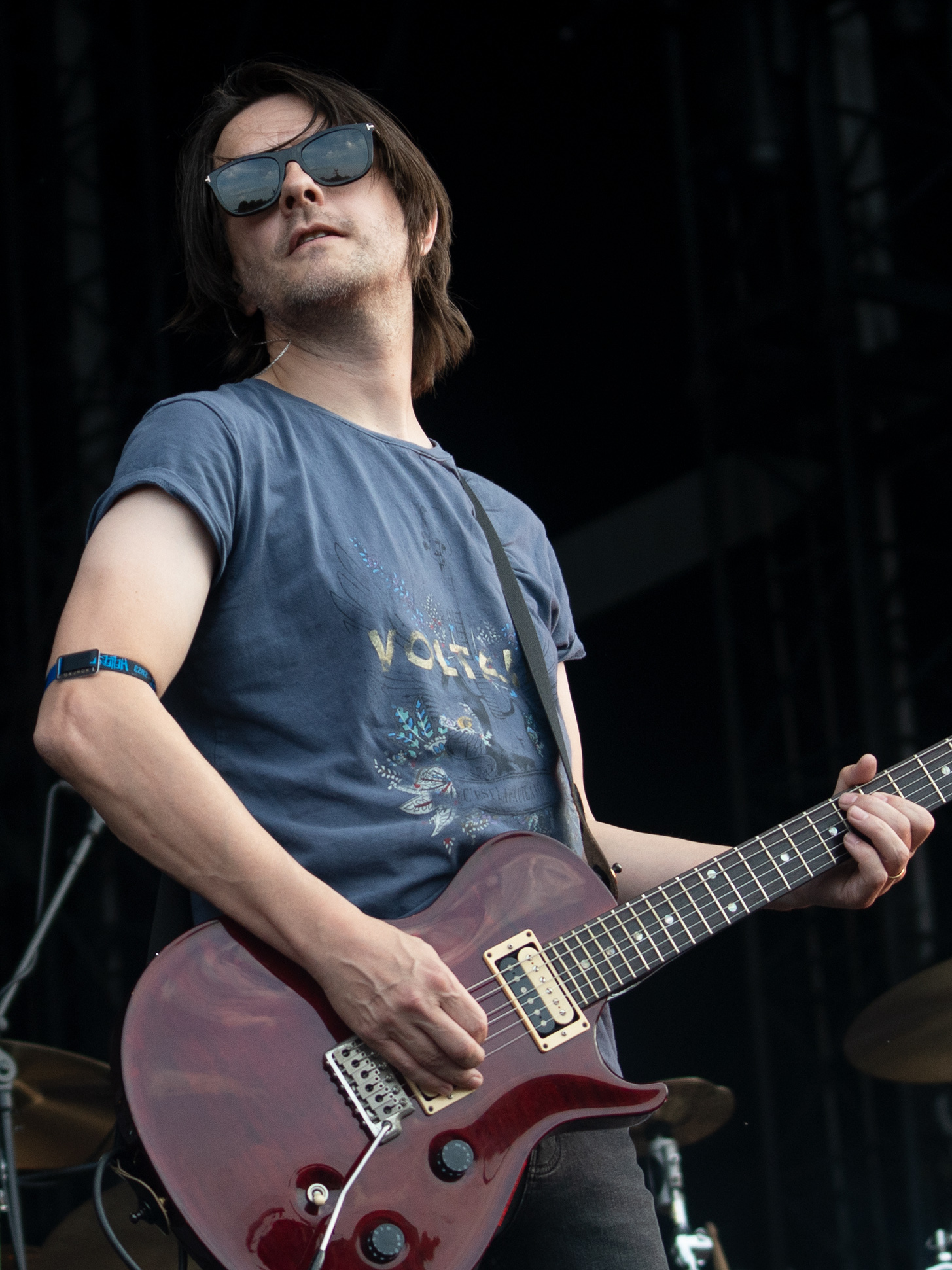
- Wilson performing in 2023

Background information
- Born: Steven John Wilson; 3 November 1967 (age 59); Kingston upon Thames, London, England
- Origin: Hemel Hempstead, Hertfordshire, England
- Genres: Progressive rock; art rock; post-progressive
- Occupations: Musician; singer; songwriter; record producer
- Instruments: Vocals; guitar; piano; keyboards; bass
- Years active: 1980–present
- Labels: Virgin Music UK, Kscope
- Member of: Porcupine Tree; No-Man; Blackfield; Bass Communion; Storm Corrosion
- Formerly of: Incredible Expanding Mindfuck
- Website: Steven Wilson HQ

Steven John Wilson (born 3 November 1967) is an English musician, composer and multi-instrumentalist. He is the founder, guitarist, lead vocalist, and songwriter of the progressive rock band Porcupine Tree, as well as being a member of several other bands, including Blackfield, Storm Corrosion and No-Man. He has also released nine studio albums as a solo artist since 2008. In a career spanning more than 30 years, Wilson has made music prolifically and earned critical acclaim. His honours include six nominations for Grammy Awards: twice with Porcupine Tree, once with his collaborative band Storm Corrosion and three times as a solo artist. In 2017, The Daily Telegraph described him as "a resolutely independent artist" and "probably the most successful British artist you've never heard of".

Wilson is a self-taught composer, producer, audio engineer, guitar and keyboard player, and plays other instruments as needed, including bass guitar, autoharp, hammered dulcimer and flute. His influences and work have encompassed a diverse range of genres including pop, psychedelia, progressive rock and electronic, among others, shifting his musical direction through his albums. His concerts incorporate quadraphonic sound and elaborate visuals. He has worked with artists such as Elton John, Guns N' Roses, XTC, Opeth, Pendulum, Yes, King Crimson, Fish, Marillion, Black Sabbath, and Anathema, and has built a reputation for his work remixing classic pop and rock records into new stereo, binaural, 5.1 and Dolby Atmos versions.

== Biography ==
=== Early years ===
Born in Kingston upon Thames, London, Wilson was raised from age six in Hemel Hempstead, Hertfordshire, where he discovered his interest in music around the age of eight. According to Wilson, his life was changed one Christmas when his parents bought presents for each other in the form of LPs. His father and mother received Pink Floyd's The Dark Side of the Moon and Donna Summer's Love to Love You Baby, respectively. It was Wilson's affinity for these albums that helped craft his guitar and songwriting abilities. He said, "In retrospect I can see how they are almost entirely responsible for the direction that my music has taken ever since." His interest in Pink Floyd led him towards experimental and psychedelic conceptual progressive rock (as exemplified by Porcupine Tree and Blackfield), and Donna Summer's trance-inflected grooves inspired the initial musical approach of No-Man (Wilson's long-running collaboration with fellow musician and vocalist Tim Bowness).

As a child, Wilson was forced to learn the guitar, but he did not enjoy it; his parents eventually stopped paying for lessons. When he was eleven, he found a nylon-string classical guitar in his attic and experimented with it; in his own words, "scraping microphones across the strings, feeding the resulting sound into overloaded reel to reel tape recorders and producing a primitive form of multi-track recording by bouncing between two cassette machines". A year later, his father, who was an electronic engineer, built him his first multi-track tape machine and a vocoder so he could experiment with the possibilities of studio recording.

=== Early bands ===
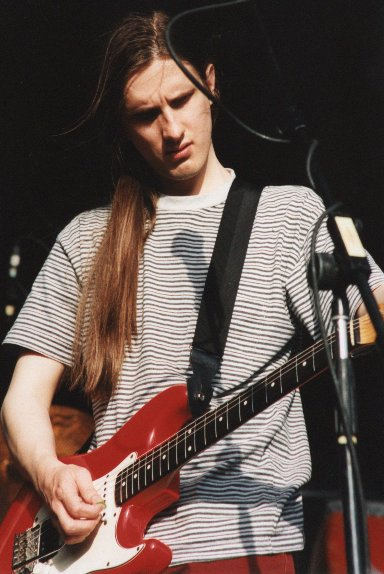
Wilson in 1997

Wilson said his taste in music diverged from his peers in the 1980s:

I grew up in the 80s, and it was a pretty bad decade for music. There were some interesting things developing, but everyone I knew wanted to be in Level 42, Simple Minds or U2. I wasn't interested in any of that, so I found solace in the 60s and 70s music that my parents were listening to. And I began to discover this wonderful era, what you'd call the great album era, from 1967 to 1977, from Sgt Pepper through to punk.

One of Wilson's earliest musical projects was the psychedelic duo Altamont (featuring a 15-year-old Wilson working with synth/electronics player Simon Vockings). Their only cassette album, Prayer for the Soul, featured lyrics by English psychedelic scenester Alan Duffy, whose work Wilson would later use on the first two Porcupine Tree albums. Around the time that Wilson was part of Altamont, he was also in a progressive rock band called Karma, which played live around Hertfordshire and recorded two cassette albums, The Joke's on You (1983) and The Last Man To Laugh (1985). These contained early versions of "Small Fish", "Nine Cats" and "The Joke's on You", which were subsequently resurrected as Porcupine Tree songs.

Wilson went on to join the new wave/AOR band Pride of Passion as keyboard player, replacing former Marillion keyboard player Brian Jelliman. (Another former Marillion member, Diz Minnitt, also played in the band.) Pride of Passion later changed their name to Blazing Apostles and altered their lineup and approach, finally dissolving in 1987.

=== Breakthrough work ===
In 1987, Wilson launched the two projects that would make his name. The first of these was initially called No Man Is An Island (Except The Isle of Man), although it was later renamed No-Man. This began life as a solo Wilson instrumental project blending progressive rock with synth pop, subsequently moving towards art-pop when singer/lyricist Tim Bowness joined the project the following year. The second project was Porcupine Tree, which was originally intended to be a full-on pastiche of psychedelic rock (inspired by the similar Dukes of Stratosphear project by XTC) carried out for the mutual entertainment of Wilson and his childhood friend Malcolm Stocks.

Over the next three years, the projects evolved in parallel. Of his two efforts, No Man Is An Island (Except The Isle of Man) was the first to release a commercial single (1989's "The Girl From Missouri", on Plastic Head Records), while Porcupine Tree built an increasing underground reputation via the release of a series of cassette-only releases via The Freak Emporium (the mail-order wing of British psychedelic label Delerium Records).

By 1990, No Man Is An Island (Except The Isle of Man) had fully evolved into No-Man and was a voice/violin/multi-instrument trio which had incorporated dance beats into its art-pop sound. The second No-Man single – a crooned cover of the Donovan song "Colours" arranged in a dub-loop style anticipating trip hop – won the Single of the Week award in Melody Maker and gained the band a recording contract with the high-profile independent label One Little Indian (at the time, famous for the Shamen and Björk). Their debut One Little Indian single, "Days in the Trees", won the same Single of the Week award the following year. The single also briefly charted and, although sales were not outstanding, Wilson had now gained credibility in the record industry (as well as enough finance to fit out his home studio with the equipment he would need to advance his music).

By this time, Wilson had also released the official Porcupine Tree debut album, On the Sunday of Life... (1992) (which compiled the best material from the underground tapes). No-Man's debut full-length release – a compilation of EP tracks called Lovesighs – An Entertainment – followed in 1992, as did Porcupine Tree's infamous LSD-themed maxi-single "Voyage 34" which made the NME indie chart for six weeks. No-Man also toured England with a six-piece band including three ex-members of the art-pop band Japan – Mick Karn, Steve Jansen and (most significantly, as he would become a Porcupine Tree member) keyboardist Richard Barbieri. 1993 saw Wilson consolidating his initial success with albums from both Porcupine Tree with Up the Downstair (1993) and No-Man with Loveblows & Lovecries – A Confession (1993).

Porcupine Tree, meanwhile, had morphed into an actual band which toured frequently and passed through various overt phases of different musical stylings (including psychedelia, progressive rock, modern guitar rock and heavy metal) while retaining the core of Wilson's sonic imagination and songwriting. By the mid-2000s Porcupine Tree had become a well known rock band with albums on major labels such as Atlantic and Roadrunner.

=== Diversification and collaborations ===
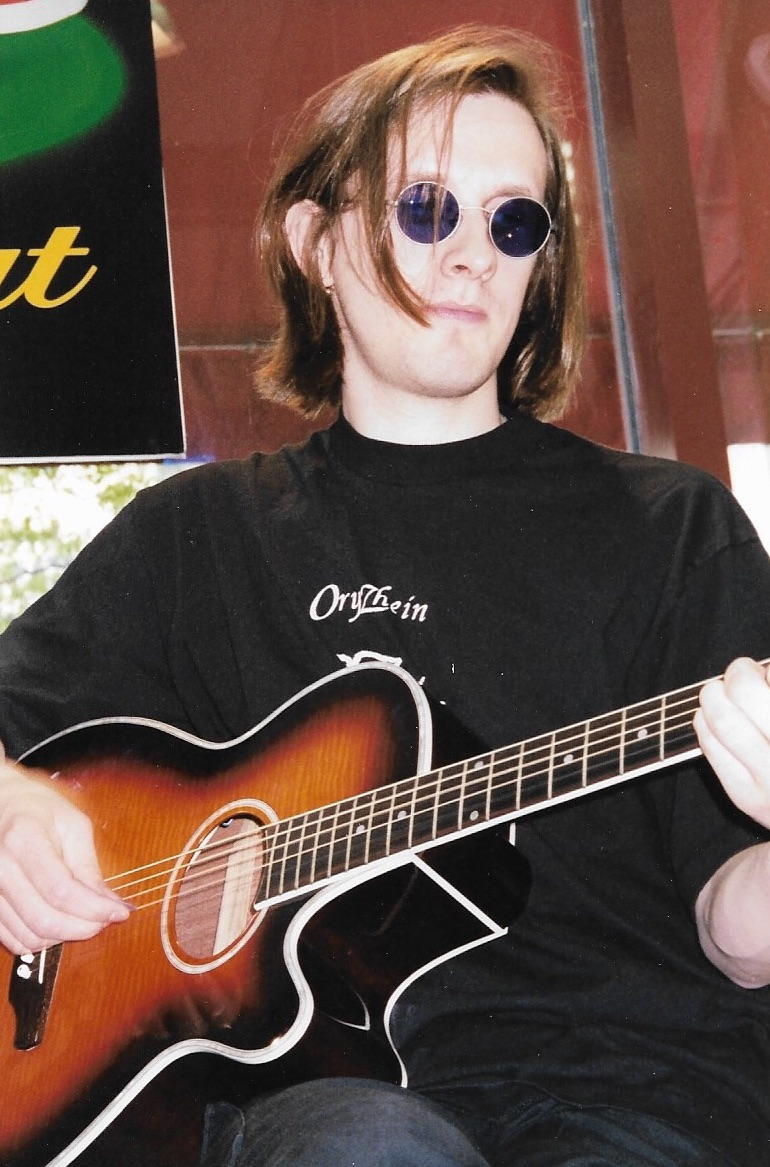
Wilson in 1999

During the late 1990s, Wilson's love of experimental, drone and ambient music led to a series of new projects, notably Bass Communion and Incredible Expanding Mindfuck (also known as IEM). He also began to release a series of CD singles under his own name.

Having established himself as a producer, Wilson was invited to produce other artists, notably the Norwegian artist Anja Garbarek and Swedish progressive-metal band Opeth. Though he claims to enjoy production more than anything else, with the demands of his own projects, he has mostly restricted himself to mixing for other artists in the last few years.

Wilson has written reviews for the Mexican edition of the Rolling Stone magazine. They are all translated into Spanish. Two reviews have been published so far: one for Radiohead's In Rainbows and another for Murcof's 2007 work, Cosmos. He has also contributed to US magazine Electronic Musician. Wilson wrote the foreword for 2010 book Mean Deviation.

Wilson produced and contributed backing vocals, guitar and keyboards for Opeth on the albums Blackwater Park, Deliverance, and Damnation, also contributing lyrics for one song (Death Whispered a Lullaby) on Damnation. In addition to this, he has collaborated on many projects with Belgian experimental musician Dirk Serries of Vidna Obmana and Fear Falls Burning, most notably on their collaboration project Continuum, which has so far produced two albums. Wilson is also featured on a Fovea Hex EP, Allure (Part 3 of the "Neither Speak Nor Remain Silent" trilogy of EPs), on bass guitar. This EP was released in April 2007 through Die-Stadt Musik.

Wilson has worked with a range of other artists, including OSI, JBK, Orphaned Land, Paatos, Theo Travis, Yoko Ono, Fish, Cipher and Anja Garbarek, by writing songs as well as performing musically. Wilson is featured on the Pendulum album Immersion, with his vocals featuring on "The Fountain". He made a guest appearance on Dream Theater's 2007 album, Systematic Chaos, on the song "Repentance", as one of several musical guests recorded apologizing to important people in their lives for wrongdoings in the past.

Wilson did an interview with German musician and composer Klaus Schulze. Schulze was an important figure of the Krautrock movement. This interview is featured as bonus material in Schulze's live DVD Rheingold.

Wilson has become known for his 5.1 surround sound mixes, with the 2007 Porcupine Tree album Fear of a Blank Planet nominated for a Grammy Award in the "Best Mix For Surround Sound" category. It was also voted No. 3 album of the year by Sound And Vision. Wilson has worked on several other surround sound projects, which have included remixing the Jethro Tull and King Crimson back catalogues, as well as Marillion's 1985 album Misplaced Childhood. The Anathema album We're Here Because We're Here was mixed by Wilson and he is thanked in the album liner notes, and he mixed two songs on their subsequent album Distant Satellites. He also did the remix for In the Land of Grey and Pink by Canterbury scene band Caravan. The first three new editions were issued in October 2009, with more emerging in batches over the coming years. Wilson is responsible for the 5.1 and new stereo mixes of the 1992 XTC album Nonsuch in 2013, as well as the Gentle Giant albums The Power and the Glory and Octopus in 2014 and 2015, respectively. In 2018, he released Yes: The Steven Wilson Remixes, consisting of the albums The Yes Album (1971), Fragile (1971), Close to the Edge (1972), the double album Tales From Topographic Oceans (1973), and Relayer (1974).

Wilson's other remixes include the Who's Who's Next, Tears for Fears' Songs from the Big Chair and The Seeds of Love, Van Morrison's Moondance, Sister Sledge's We Are Family, Nile Rodgers & Chic's first five studio albums, Ultravox's Vienna, Suede's self-titled debut album, and Roxy Music's self-titled debut album.

== Solo career ==
=== 2003–2010: Cover Version ===
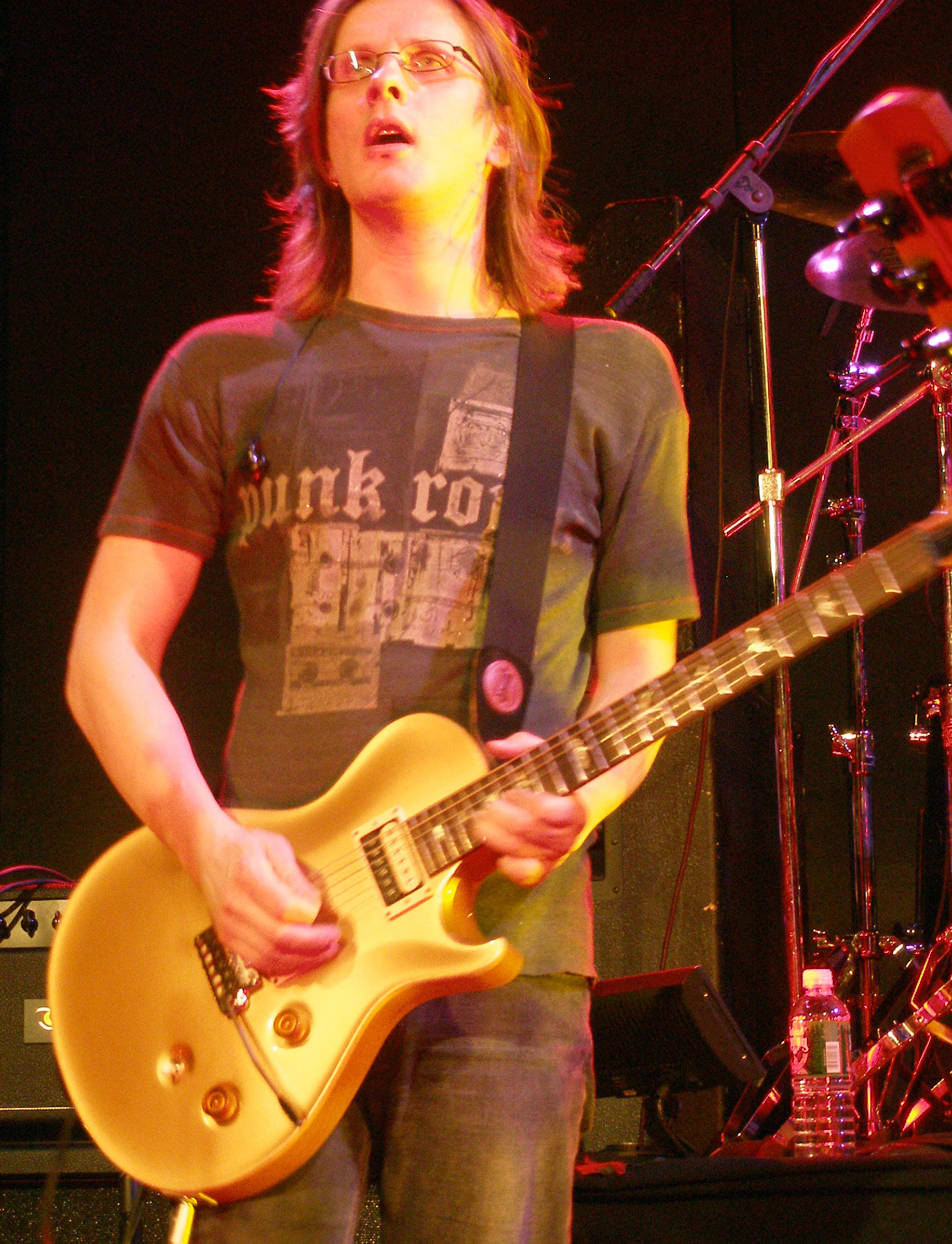
Wilson performing in 2007

Between 2003 and 2010, Wilson released a series of six two-track CD singles under his own name. Each single featured a cover version and an original song – or, in one case, a Wilson arrangement of a traditional song. It featured songs by Canadian singer Alanis Morissette, Swedish pop group ABBA, English rock band the Cure, Scottish songwriter Momus, American musician Prince, and Scottish singer-songwriter Donovan.

Separate from the Cover Versions series, Wilson has contributed a cover version of the Cardiacs song "Stoneage Dinosaurs". The song was featured on Leader of the Starry Skies: A Tribute to Tim Smith, Songbook 1, which is a fundraising compilation album released in December 2010 to benefit the hospitalised Cardiacs leader Tim Smith, whom Wilson has cited as a major inspiration spiritually, if not necessarily in style.

The complete collection of the cover-version songs was released as an album titled Cover Version in 2014.

=== 2008–2009: Debut solo album Insurgentes ===
In November 2008, Wilson released his first official solo album, Insurgentes, recorded between January and August 2008. The album was first released as two limited-edition versions, both with hardback book featuring the images of longtime collaborator Danish photographer Lasse Hoile. A standard retail version was released on 9 March 2009.

Lasse Hoile's full-length feature version of the film based on the recording of the album was premiered at the CPH:DOX international film festival in Copenhagen in November 2009. The film was also screened at film festivals in Canada, Germany, Mexico, Sweden and United States. The film is described as part documentary, part surreal road movie. Hoile also directed a video for the song "Harmony Korine" from the album. The video was a homage to European art house films, and has been nominated for "Best Cinematography Award" and "Best Music Video Award" at Camerimage.

A remix mini album was released in June 2009, featuring remixes of material from Insurgentes by David A. Sitek, Dälek, Engineers, Pat Mastelotto and Fear Falls Burning.

=== 2010–2012: Grace for Drowning, Get All You Deserve live concert film ===
Wilson's second solo album, Grace for Drowning, was released in September 2011 in CD, vinyl and Blu-ray formats. It is a double album, with the individual parts named Deform to Form a Star and Like Dust I Have Cleared from My Eye. Wilson also announced his first solo tour in Europe and North America to promote his solo albums. The tour took place in October and November 2011 and contained songs from both Insurgentes and Grace for Drowning. A live video performance recorded in Mexico titled Get All You Deserve was released on 25 September 2012.

On 16 December 2011, Wilson announced new European tour dates for the second leg of his Grace for Drowning tour, running in April and May 2012. South American dates were later added and announced on 21 February 2012. He also won the "Guiding Light" title at the Progressive Music Awards in 2012.

=== 2013–2014: The Raven That Refused to Sing (And Other Stories) ===
Wilson's third solo studio album, recorded with most of the members of the touring band for Grace for Drowning was released on 25 February 2013. Alan Parsons engineered the sessions in Los Angeles. The album reached the top 30 in the UK, and number 3 in the German album charts. In October 2012, Wilson announced the first leg of the supporting tour, consisting of 18 shows across Europe and 17 shows across North America between March and May 2013. For these shows, Chad Wackerman (best known for his work with Frank Zappa) replaced Marco Minnemann on drums due to conflicting schedules. The second leg of the tour from October–November 2013 covered Australia and Europe, and included a sold-out show at the Royal Albert Hall in London. The song "The Raven That Refused to Sing" was featured in the trailer for the 2014 film Pompeii. The album finished top of several critics and readers polls, including UK Prog magazine and German magazine Eclipsed. The album was voted album of the year at the 2013 Progressive Music Awards. On 13 July 2015 The Prog Report ranked the album as No. 2 on their top prog albums of the last 25 years.

=== 2015–2016: Hand. Cannot. Erase. ===
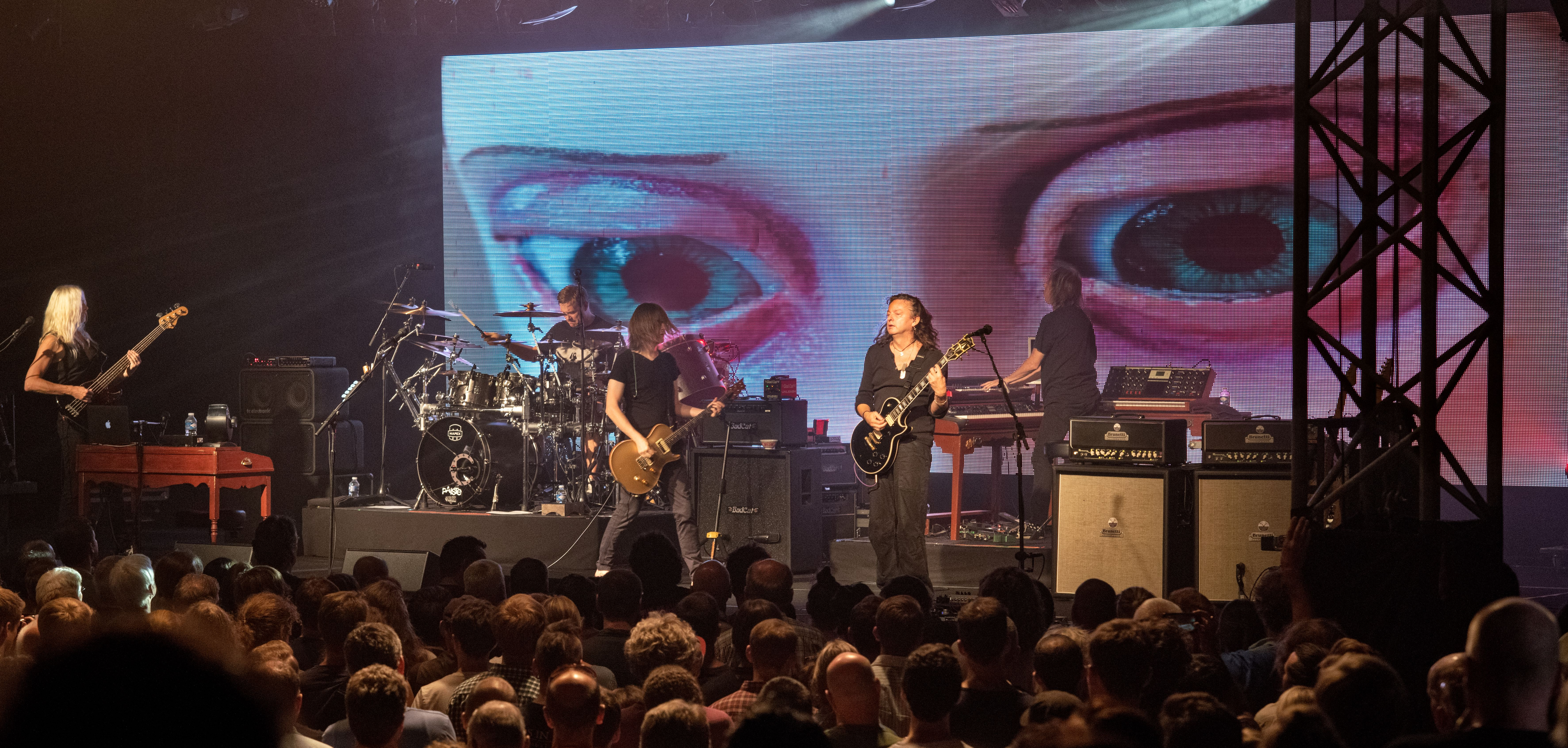
Wilson at Zelt-Musik-Festival in Germany, 2016

Wilson's fourth solo album, Hand. Cannot. Erase., was released on 27 February 2015. It was inspired by a documentary about Joyce Carol Vincent, a young British woman who lay dead in her apartment for nearly three years before being discovered. Hand. Cannot. Erase. received critical acclaim from music critics. The Guardian rated the album five stars and called it "a smart, soulful and immersive work of art". Eclipsed magazine described the album as "one more shining jewel in the discography of Steven Wilson" and Metal Hammer awarded Hand. Cannot. Erase. 6/7 and described it as "another masterpiece". US website FDRMX rated the album 4.8/5 and stated, "Hand. Cannot. Erase. grabs your full attention from the beginning to the very final note, and that's the sign of a great album". The supporting tour spanned from March to June 2015 and consisted of 31 shows in Europe and a total of 34 shows in North and South America. In September, two special shows took place at the Royal Albert Hall in London. Due to the Aristocrats' tour, for the American shows Guthrie Govan and Marco Minnemann were replaced by Dave Kilminster and Craig Blundell, respectively.

=== 2017–2018: To the Bone ===
On 12 December 2016, Wilson began recording his fifth solo studio album with engineer Paul Stacey in London. With the departure of most of the members of his solo band from the prior two albums, Wilson handled most of the guitar on the album, with Craig Blundell and Jeremy Stacey both contributing drums. Ninet Tayeb was featured on additional vocals and had a bigger role than she did on Hand. Cannot. Erase. Andy Partridge of XTC revealed that he co-wrote two songs for the album. On 5 January 2017, Wilson posted a teaser clip of himself and Ninet Tayeb recording a new song titled "Pariah". In April 2017, Wilson announced that he had switched record labels for the release, with the album to be released on Caroline International. Wilson also mentioned that harmonica player Mark Feltham is going to be playing on the next record and released a clip of him contributing to a song titled "To the Bone". Slovak musician David Kollar featured on three songs of the new record.

On 9 May 2017, the album was officially unveiled as To the Bone and released on 18 August 2017. Wilson embarked on major tours of the UK, Europe and North America in 2018 and 2019 to promote the album. For the tour, Alex Hutchings was introduced to replace Dave Kilminster as the guitarist of the live band, as the latter would go on to work in Roger Waters' band.

On 12 September 2018, a live album was announced via his official Instagram account under the name Home Invasion: In Concert at the Royal Albert Hall, and it was released on 2 November 2018.

=== 2019–2021: The Future Bites ===
On 26 May 2019, Wilson confirmed on his Instagram account that the writing and recording process on his sixth studio album was underway. It was expected to be released in 2020. The album was produced by David Kosten, who is also known as Faultline, making the upcoming album Wilson's second to not be produced by him alone. On 21 October 2019, Wilson announced 'The Future Bites Tour', his largest and most ambitious show to date. The Future Bites Tour was planned to be performed in large arenas in the UK, France, Germany, The Netherlands and Poland in September 2020. On 24 December 2019, Wilson announced that his as yet untitled sixth studio album was close to completion and promised further news in early 2020.

On 5 March 2020, Wilson began a teaser campaign across his online channels, centering on modern themes of consumerism, product branding and manipulative social media. A few days later, artwork for "Personal Shopper" was unveiled with a release date of 12 March 2020 at 9am GMT. On 12 March 2020, Wilson announced that his sixth solo album, The Future Bites, would be released on 12 June 2020. The first single from the album, "Personal Shopper" (featuring a spoken-word appearance by Elton John), was released the same day.

On 22 April 2020, Wilson announced that the release date of The Future Bites would be pushed back to 29 January 2021, due to logistical/creative challenges facing the music industry amid the COVID-19 pandemic.

In May 2020, Wilson launched "The Album Years", an audio-only podcast with his partner in No-Man, Tim Bowness. It was very successful upon release, charting highly all around the world on Apple Podcasts. Starting in March 2024 new video episodes of the podcast were recorded and released.

On 22 September 2020, Wilson relaunched The Future Bites with a revised album tracklist and the release of a new single, "Eminent Sleaze", along with the release of a video produced by Crystal Spotlight. On 29 October 2020, Wilson released a video for "King Ghost", the third single to be taken from The Future Bites. This was directed by Wilson's longtime video collaborator Jess Cope.

On 24 November 2020, Wilson released "12 Things I Forgot", the fourth single from The Future Bites. The release of "12 Things I Forgot" was accompanied with an announcement that a completely unique, one of one limited edition of The Future Bites would be sold on 27 November 2020 for £10,000, with all proceeds going to Music Venue Trust to help save UK music venues affected by the COVID-19 pandemic. This edition of the album sold immediately after going on sale.

=== 2021–2023: The Harmony Codex ===
On 22 March 2021, Wilson announced that due to uncertainty surrounding live performances amidst the COVID-19 pandemic, The Future Bites Tour (scheduled to begin in September 2021) would be cancelled. Wilson stated that he would now concentrate on upcoming music projects, including his seventh studio album, a conceptual work entitled The Harmony Codex planned for release in mid-2023. Wilson also revealed an autobiography, Limited Edition of One, which was published by Little, Brown and Company on 7 April 2022. In his 2023 new year's message, Wilson stated that The Harmony Codex is to be released on the Virgin Music label and will be 65 minutes long. The album was released on 29 September 2023.

=== 2024–2025: The Overview ===
Wilson began working on his eighth studio album called The Overview in February 2024, and it was tentatively scheduled for release in early 2025. When asked when the album might be released, Wilson stated,

Beginning of 2025. I work very quickly and I'm still excited by making music. This is just two 20-minute long tracks. So it's a very conceptual, and I think that'll be finished and ready to come out early next year.

On 24 June 2024, Wilson announced The Overview Tour with dates scheduled for May–June 2025 in the UK and Europe, and November 2025 in India. It is his first solo tour since the To the Bone Tour in 2018–2019.

The Overview was released on 14 March 2025. Its tour (his first in well over seven years) was documented with the live release Impossible Tightrope: Live In Madrid, released in early 2026 via Headphone Dust.

=== 2026: Requiem for a Village ===
On 24 March 2026, a post titled In Search of Otherness... was published on Steven Wilson's social media channels. Wilson asked fans to send him black-and-white photos of rural villages taken between 1960 and 1970, including a photo to be used as reference or example, for his next album, without specifying the title or release date. Wilson also mentioned that if he used one or more photos from one of the people who submitted their own, they would receive a free copy of the deluxe edition of the album. Photo submissions closed on 3 April of that year.

In early July 2026, rumors began circulating about the release date and title of Wilson's next album. These rumors were later confirmed on 7 July, when a post appeared on Reddit with a screenshot of purchases of a supposed Steven Wilson album titled Requiem for a Village, which was supposedly set to be released on 6 November of that year, with the release of the title track single on 11 September.

== Musical projects ==
=== Porcupine Tree ===
Porcupine Tree started as a duo of Wilson and his school friend Malcolm Stocks (with Wilson providing the majority of the instrumentation and Stocks contributing mostly ideas, additional vocals and experimental guitar sounds). Wilson began experimenting by recording music in his home until he had the hunch it could become somehow marketable. The material was subsequently compiled into three demo tapes (Tarquin's Seaweed Farm, Love, Death & Mussolini and The Nostalgia Factory). For the first tape, he wrote an inlay introduction to an obscure (imaginary) band called "The Porcupine Tree", suggesting the band met in the early 1970s at a rock festival, and they had been in and out of prison many times. The booklet also contained information about the band's obscure members like Sir Tarquin Underspoon and Timothy Tadpole-Jones, and crew members like Linton Samuel Dawson (if put into initials forming LSD). Wilson said: "It was a bit of fun. But of course like anything that starts as a joke, people started to take it all seriously!". When Wilson signed to the Delerium label, he selected what he considered the best tracks from these early tapes. All those songs were mastered and made up Porcupine Tree's first official studio album, On the Sunday of Life....

Quickly after, Wilson released the single "Voyage 34", a thirty-minute piece that could be described as a mixture of ambient, trance and psychedelia. This was done partly as an attempt to produce the longest single yet released, which it was until it was later exceeded by The Orb's "Blue Room." With non-existent radio play "Voyage 34" still entered the NME indie chart for six weeks and became an underground chill-out classic.

The second full-length album, Up the Downstair (though Wilson considers it the first "proper" Porcupine Tree album since it was made as such and not simply compiled), was released in 1993 and had a very good reception, praised by Melody Maker as "a psychedelic masterpiece... one of the albums of the year". This was the first album to include ex-Japan member, keyboardist Richard Barbieri and Australian-born bassist Colin Edwin. About the end of the year, Porcupine Tree became a full band for the first time with the inclusion of Chris Maitland on drums.

Wilson continued exploring the ambient and trance grounds and issued The Sky Moves Sideways. It also entered the NME, Melody Maker, and Music Week charts and many fans started hailing them as the Pink Floyd of the nineties, something Wilson would reject: "I can't help that. It's true that during the period of The Sky Moves Sideways, I had done a little too much of it in the sense of satisfying, in a way, the fans of Pink Floyd who were listening to us because that group doesn't make albums anymore. Moreover, I regret it."

The band's fourth work, Signify, included the first full-band compositions and performance, which resulted in less use of drum machines and a more full-band sound. It can be considered a departure from its predecessors for a more song-oriented style. After the release of the live album Coma Divine concluded their deal with Delerium in 1997, the band moved to Snapper and issued two poppier albums, Stupid Dream in 1999 and Lightbulb Sun in 2000.

Two years passed until their seventh studio album, and in the meantime the band switched labels again, this time signing to the major label Lava. Drummer Chris Maitland was also replaced by Gavin Harrison. In Absentia was released in 2002, featuring a heavier sound than the group's previous works. It charted in many European countries and remains one of the top-selling Porcupine Tree albums to date. The 2004 special edition was also their first record to be released in 5.1 Surround Sound, winning the "Best Made-For-Surround Title" award from the Surround Music Awards 2004 shortly afterwards.

In 2005, Porcupine Tree released Deadwing, a record inspired by a film script written by Steven Wilson and his friend Mike Bennion. This became the first Porcupine Tree album to chart on the Billboard 200, entering at No. 132. The album won Classic Rock magazine's "album of the year" award and its surround version received the "Best Made-For-Surround Title" once again.

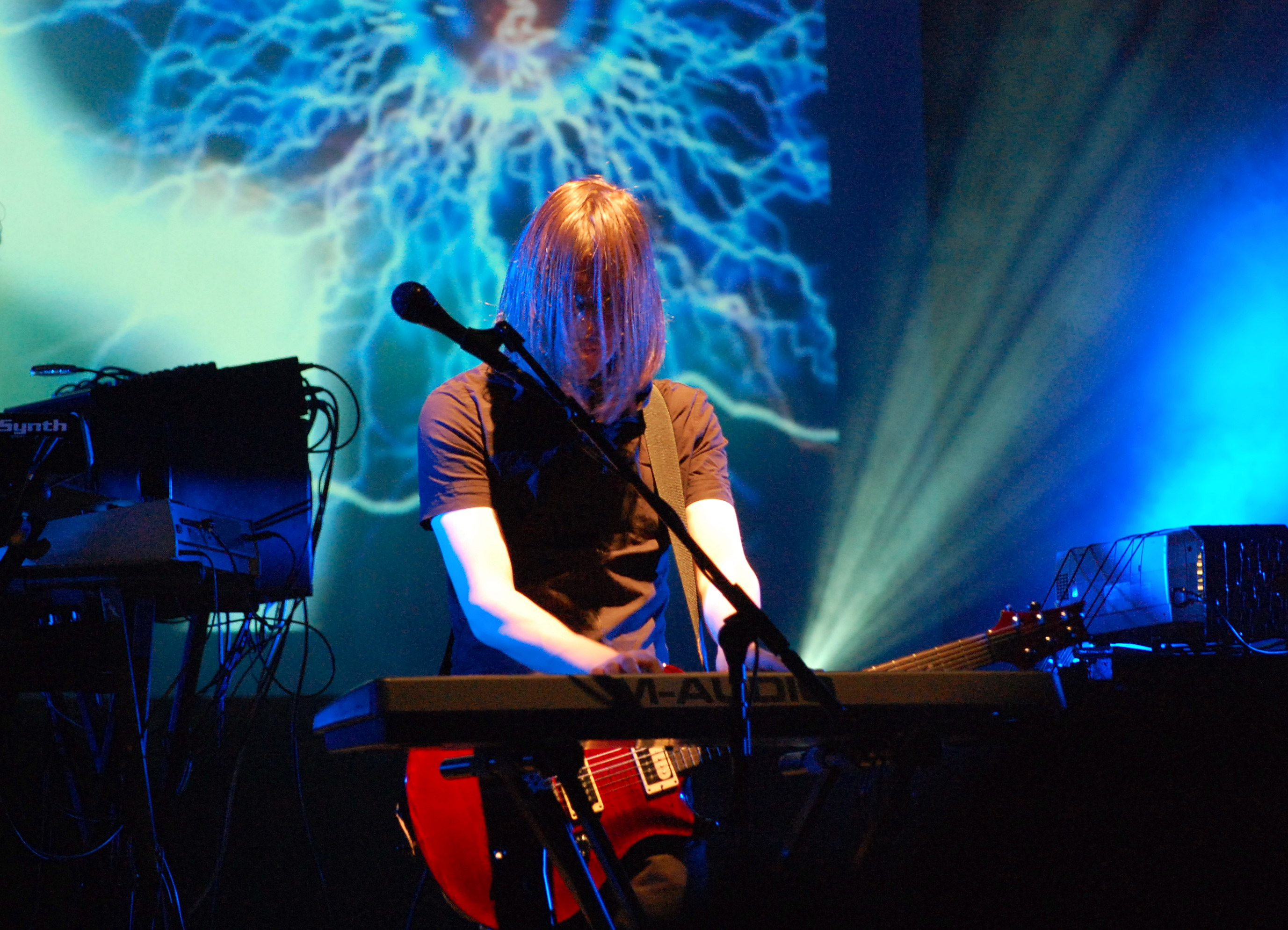
Wilson with Porcupine Tree at Arena, Poznań, Poland, November 2007

Wilson started writing Porcupine Tree's next album in early 2006 in Tel Aviv, Israel, alongside work on the second album for his side project Blackfield. Writing sessions finished in London, UK, in June 2006. In August of the same year the band released their first live DVD, titled Arriving Somewhere..., and started a tour between September and November to promote it; the first half of each show was made up of new material. When the tour concluded, the band went into the studio and finished recording and mastering the album. In early January 2007, the band revealed the album title would be Fear of a Blank Planet (a deliberate reference to Public Enemy's Fear of a Black Planet) and the concept was influenced by the Bret Easton Ellis novel Lunar Park. The album hit the shops on 16 April 2007 in Europe and 24 April in USA. The lyrics revolve around common 21st-century issues such as technology alienation, teen violence, prescription drugs, attention deficit disorder and bipolar disorder.

Fear of a Blank Planet resulted in the most successful album to date in terms of market and sales, and also received the most favourable reviews of the band's career. It entered the Billboard 200 at No. 59, and charted in almost all European countries, peaking at No. 31 in the UK. It was nominated for a Grammy Award, and won several polls as the best album of the year (e.g. Classic Rock magazine, Aardshock, The Netherlands). In July 2007, the Nil Recurring EP was released, containing material that had been left off the album.

At a European show in August 2008, Wilson said Porcupine Tree was beginning work on material for their next album with an eye toward a release in 2009. This album was later revealed to be titled The Incident. The Incident is a double CD containing "The Incident", a 55-minute "song cycle", on the first disc and four shorter songs on the second. It has received significant attention and media coverage and the band achieved their highest chart positions to date, reaching 5 in The Netherlands, 9 in Germany, 23 in the UK and 25 on the Billboard 200 in the USA. The subsequent tour of the US and Europe highlighted a large increase in the band's following, with many shows sold out. The single from The Incident, "Time Flies", was available as a free download from iTunes for one week in October 2009. In 2010 after this tour, the band became inactive as Wilson committed himself to his solo work and other members worked on their own projects.

The band re-formed in 2021 after a 12-year hiatus. The band is now a trio of Wilson, Barbieri and Harrison. The band's former bassist, Colin Edwin, did not return. The re-formation was formally revealed on 1 November 2021, with the simultaneous release of the "Harridan" single and the announcement of a new studio album, Closure/Continuation, released on 24 June 2022.

=== No-Man ===
No-Man is Wilson's long-term collaboration with singer and songwriter Tim Bowness. Influenced by styles from ambient music to hip-hop, their early singles and albums were a mixture of dance beats and lush orchestrations. After a few years the duo started to create more textural and experimental music. Beginning with Flowermouth in 1994, they have worked with a very wide palette of sounds, and many guest musicians, blending balladry with both acoustic and electronic sounds. No-Man was the first Wilson project to achieve any degree of success, signing with UK independent label One Little Indian (the label of Björk, the Shamen and Skunk Anansie among others).

On 22 November 2019, the band released their seventh album, Love You to Bits, their first original recording in 11 years.

=== I.E.M. ===
In 1996, the first in a series of albums by I.E.M. (The Incredible Expanding Mindfuck, a name which had also been considered for Porcupine Tree in its infancy) was released, dedicated to exploring Wilson's love of krautrock and experimental rock music. Initially, Wilson had planned for the project to be anonymous, but label Delerium Records published a song on their Pick N Mix compilation with the composition credited to Steven Wilson, so attempts to pass off the project in this way were abandoned. The project released two more albums, Arcadia Son and IEM Have Come For Your Children, in 2001. A box set of four CDs, consisting of everything Wilson recorded under the name – billed as "an homage and a final farewell to I.E.M." – was released in June 2010.

=== Bass Communion ===
In 1998, Wilson launched Bass Communion, a project dedicated to recordings in an industrial, ambient, drone, and/or electronic vein. So far there have been several full length Bass Communion CDs, vinyl LPs, and singles, many of them issued in handmade or limited editions.

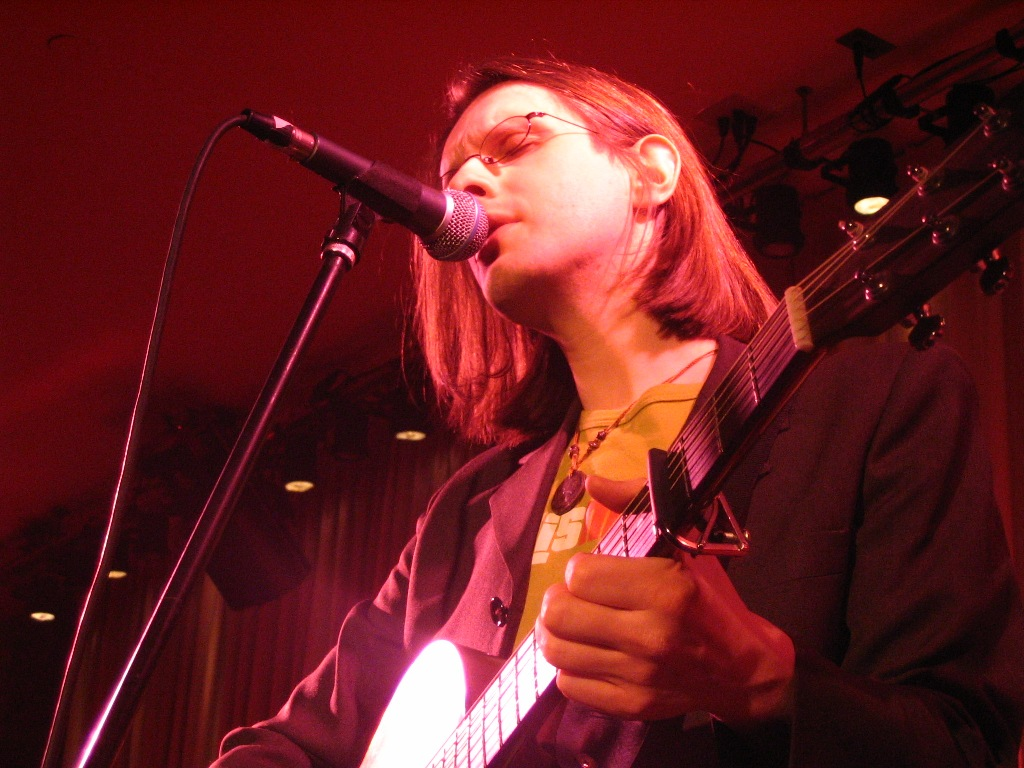
Wilson during a Blackfield performance at New York, in 2005

=== Blackfield ===
In 2001, Wilson met and began to collaborate with Israeli rock musician Aviv Geffen, with whom he created the band Blackfield. The duo have released six albums of what they refer to as "melodic and melancholic rock." The albums spawned several singles, notably "Blackfield," "Pain" and "Once." A live DVD from a show in New York was released in 2007. A third album, Welcome to My DNA, came in March 2011. Later that year Wilson decided to take a secondary role in the band, feeling that with so much of his time and attention devoted to his solo career, there was not enough left for him to properly fill the role of co-leader of Blackfield as well. He still contributed to the band's fourth album in 2013 as singer and producer. Wilson left the band after a short European tour in February 2014 and a final date in New York City on 1 May 2014, due to his increasingly tight schedule with his solo career and upcoming projects. In June 2015 and June 2016, Wilson was seen in recording sessions with Geffen and Alan Parsons. In August 2016, Blackfield announced that their new album, Blackfield V, would mark the return of Wilson to the band in "full partnership". On 13 May 2019, Geffen uploaded a picture to his official Instagram account, revealing that both musicians are currently working on their sixth record.

=== Storm Corrosion ===
In March 2010, Wilson and Mikael Åkerfeldt, the front man of Opeth, decided to work on a new project as a collaboration under the name of Storm Corrosion. The self-titled album was released in May 2012 on Roadrunner Records. It has been described as "the final part in the odd trilogy of records completed by (Opeth's) Heritage and Steven Wilson's second solo album Grace for Drowning." They did not tour or play any live shows in support of the album, and while the two have expressed interest in working together again, nothing definite has emerged from this.

== Performance style ==
For live shows, Wilson plays barefoot, a habit that goes back to his early childhood. He said, "I always had a problem wearing shoes and I've always gone around with bare feet." He said that another factor in performing barefoot is the advantage it gives in operating his diverse guitar pedals. He has injured his feet as a result: in one of his early shows, he ended up with a syringe inserted in his foot and had to get a tetanus vaccine. He said, "I've stepped on nails, screws, drawing pins, stubbed my toe, I've come off stage with blood just coming out ... I mean, I've had it all mate, but to be honest, nothing's going to stop me." He later started using a carpet, which reduced the frequency of such incidents.

== Recognition and influence ==
In addition to his legacy with Porcupine Tree, some artists have cited Wilson directly as an influence, including Steffen Kummerer of Obscura, Caligula's Horse, Tor Oddmund Suhrke of Leprous, Jonathan Carpenter of the Contortionist, Bilocate, and Alex Vynogradoff of Kauan.

Other artists have been quoted expressing admiration for his solo work, including Elton John, Alex Lifeson, Steve Howe, Robert Trujillo, Adrian Belew, Jordan Rudess, Mike Portnoy, Rob Swire, Seven Lions, Demians (Nicolas Chapel), Jem Godfrey, Jim Matheos, Dan Briggs, Eraldo Bernocchi, and Chantel McGregor.

== Personal life ==
Wilson prefers to keep a low profile, following the example of musicians from bands like Radiohead, Pink Floyd and Tool, but a few years ago he started sharing snapshots of his life on Instagram. He shared the news that he married his girlfriend Rotem in September 2019, subsequently sharing a wedding picture on his Instagram page. His wife has two daughters from her previous marriage. His family has also set up an Instagram account for their dog Bowie Wilson, named after David Bowie.

Wilson is a vegan and an atheist, and although fascinated by the subject of religion, he is a strong critic of organised religion. He believes in not imposing his views, but to express them through stories and characters, saying, "I think that is all you can do as an artist. Not preach to your audience but just reflect the world with all its flaws and joys." He does not smoke and does not use recreational drugs, except for an occasional drink.

In a 2016 interview with The Jerusalem Post, he expressed admiration for Israel and criticised musicians such as Roger Waters who had boycotted the country.

In a June 2022 interview with Qobuz alongside Richard Barbieri, he mentioned that Zeit by the German electronic music pioneers Tangerine Dream was his favourite album of all time; he called the band the "birth of ambient music".

== Live band members ==
=== Current live members ===
- Steven Wilson – vocals, guitar, keyboards, bass (2011–present)
- Nick Beggs – bass, Chapman stick, backing vocals (2011–present)
- Adam Holzman – keyboards (2011–present)
- Craig Blundell – drums (2015–present)
- Randy McStine – guitar, backing vocals (2025–present)

=== Past live members ===
- Marco Minnemann – drums (2011–2013, 2013–2015)
- Chad Wackerman – drums (2013)
- Theo Travis – flute, saxophone, clarinet, keyboards (2011–2014)
- Aziz Ibrahim – guitar (2011)
- John Wesley – guitar (2011)
- Niko Tsonev – guitar (2012)
- Guthrie Govan – guitar (2013–2015)
- Ninet Tayeb – vocals (2015–2019)
- Dave Kilminster – guitar, backing vocals (2015–2016)
- Alex Hutchings – guitar, backing vocals (2018–2019)

== Tours ==
- Grace for Drowning Tour (2011–2012)
- The Raven That Refused to Sing Tour (2013)
- Hand. Cannot. Erase. Tour (2015–2016)
- To the Bone Tour (2018–2019)
- The Overview Tour (2025)

== Discography ==
Solo studio albums

- Insurgentes (2008)
- Grace for Drowning (2011)
- The Raven That Refused to Sing (And Other Stories) (2013)
- Hand. Cannot. Erase. (2015)
- To the Bone (2017)
- The Future Bites (2021)
- The Harmony Codex (2023)
- The Overview (2025)
- Requiem for a Village (2026)

== Awards and honours ==
In 2016, Wilson was named one of the 15 best progressive rock guitarists through the years by Guitar World magazine. He was also ranked the seventh-best prog guitarist of 2016 by a MusicRadar readers' poll.

Wilson was awarded the UK band/artist of the year by Prog in 2018.

== Bibliography ==
- 2014 Travis, Theo. Twice Around The World: Steven Wilson Tour Blogs 2012-2013 (includes entries previously published on Travis' Facebook page, here re-edited and self-published).
- 2022 Wilson, Steven. Limited Edition of One (Little, Brown Book Group) ISBN 0349135088

== See also ==
- Last Day of June
- List of barefooters
- List of hammered dulcimer players
