= Demians =

French alternative rock band

- Origin: Normandy,
- Genres: Post-rock; Art rock Alternative rock
- Years active: 2007-present
- Label: Unsigned
- Members: Nicolas Chapel
- Past members: Antoine Pohu; Fred Mariolle; Gaël Hallier

Demians is a French alternative rock band started by Nicolas Chapel in 2007.

== Background ==
Chapel's inspiration for the name Demians came from the novel Demian by author Hermann Hesse, and his musical inspiration came from a variety of artists and sources, ranging from Radiohead to Tori Amos to ambient music.

Chapel plays all instruments and performs all vocals on the studio albums, though he performs live with a full band. All Demians releases have been self-produced and recorded in Chapel's home studios, the locations of which have changed from album to album.

== Building an Empire ==
Demians' first studio album Building an Empire was released on May 19, 2008, self-produced and released under license by InsideOut, to positive reviews. The success of Building an Empire led Chapel to assemble a live band with Gaël Hallier (drums) and Antoine Pohu (bass), and they subsequently were granted opening slots for several well-known rock and metal bands, including Porcupine Tree, Anathema, Marillion, Steven Wilson & Aviv Geffen, and Jonathan Davis of Korn. They toured throughout Europe, playing more than 40 shows in more than 12 countries.

== Mute ==
The follow-up entitled "Mute" came out on June 28, 2010 in Europe and August 10, 2010 in the US. Completely self-produced, it is licensed to Inside Out Music / Century Media, distributed by EMI Music. Chapel once again performed all instruments and vocals on the album, with two guests, Gaël Hallier playing drum duets with Chapel on "Swing Of The Airwaves" and "Hesitation Waltz", and Lepolair playing electronics on the song "Porcelain".
Very different from its predecessor, the album once again gathered excellent reviews worldwide, and brought the band's music to a wider audience.
Fred Mariolle officially joined Demians as a guitar player after the release of "Mute". The band announced on their Facebook page in March 2013 that they had been on hiatus since 2011 and had no plans for a new album. More recently, on 3 June 2014, Nicholas Chapel announced via the Demians Facebook page that he had started working on a new Demians album and would keep fans informed on its progress.

== Mercury ==
On 9 October 2014, Nicolas Chapel announced on the band's official website and Facebook page that the new album "Mercury" would come out on 17 December on CD, LP and MP3, and that the album would be exclusively available from the band's website. Extremely well received by the rock press and fans alike (the album being album of the month in December's issue of Rock Hard magazine), its sound ranges from raw alternative rock ("Mercury", "White Chalk") to post-rock ("Water and a Sigh", "Spellbound Lily"), and even blues ("Circles and Stars", "Little Invisible"). Chapel once again plays all the instruments and sings all parts on the album, producing, mixing and mastering the record as well.

== Discography ==
Albums

- Building an Empire (2008)
- Mute (2010)
- Mercury (2014)
- Battles (2016)

Music Videos

- "Temple" (2008)

== Band members ==
- Nicolas Chapel - vocals, drums, guitar, piano, and all instruments on studio recordings

== Former live band members ==
- Antoine Pohu - bass guitar
- Fred Mariolle - guitars
- Gaël Hallier - drums
