= Insurgentes (album) =

- Kscope retail edition cover

Studio album by Steven Wilson
- Released: 26 November 2008
- Recorded: Various studios over the world, December 2007 – August 2008
- Genre: Progressive rock; alternative rock
- Length: 55:22
- Label: Headphone Dust; Tonefloat; Kscope
- Producer: Steven Wilson

Steven Wilson chronology
Fear of a Blank Planet (2007)	Insurgentes (2008)	The Incident (2009)

Steven Wilson solo chronology
Insurgentes (2008)	Grace for Drowning (2011)

Alternative cover
- Initial deluxe edition release in 10" hardcover

Singles from Insurgentes
- 1. "Harmony Korine" Released: 23 February 2009

Insurgentes is the debut full-length solo album released by British musician and record producer Steven Wilson, known for being the founder and frontman of progressive rock band Porcupine Tree. The album was recorded all over the world in studios from Mexico City to Japan and Israel, between January and August 2008, and released in November 2008 as a special deluxe multi disc mail order version, with retail release to follow in February 2009. According to Wilson himself, the album contained "the most experimental song-based music [he had] made." The album is named after the Avenida de los Insurgentes, the longest avenue in Mexico City near which part of it was recorded.

== History ==
On 16 July 2008, a photograph showing Steven Wilson in the central sculpture of the Espacio Escultórico (Spanish for Sculptural Space) of UNAM's Ciudad Universitaria —located nearby the Avenida de los Insurgentes—, with a cloudy sky background and the phrase "STEVEN WILSON - INSURGENTES ...COMING SOON..." appeared in the main page at Steven Wilson's official site.

On 6 August, a trailer video was posted to Steven Wilson and Lasse Hoile's respective MySpace pages, and to Lasse Hoile's YouTube page; since 8 August, also in Wilson's webpage. The song featured in the trailer is the first song of the album, "Harmony Korine". Lasse Hoile has been collaborating as a visual and video director for Porcupine Tree, Blackfield, Opeth, Dream Theater and more recently The Pineapple Thief. The trailer belongs to a documentary of the same name he directed that accompanies the album.

On 25 August, an Insurgentes microsite was set up (which was subsequently moved to Insurgent Pharma – Pharmacy News, Drug Guides & Health Resources and is no longer online), and was the official website for the album, from which people were able to pre-order the album as of 6 October. The special edition quickly sold out.

On 28 September, a second trailer was released featuring a 3 1/2-minute edit of a song called "Get All You Deserve" (the song is 6:17 in length on the album). Since 22 October, "Get All You Deserve" can be found in an album containing sampler tracks from side projects by all Porcupine Tree members, titled Porcupine Tree - Solo Sampler 2008.

The woman appearing in the trailer is Susana Moyaho, who along with Lasse Hoile and Carl Glover captured the photographs for the booklet of the album. She also provided spoken words to the tracks "Only Child" and "Port Rubicon".

The track "Veneno para las hadas" was named after a 1984 Mexican horror film of the same name directed by Carlos Enrique Taboada.

== Influences ==
Steven Wilson mentions post-punk and shoegaze music as a major influence for the album, citing bands such as Joy Division, Killing Joke, The Flaming Lips, My Bloody Valentine and The Cure. He says the album is also very noise and drone-oriented.

== Release ==
=== Versions ===
Limited deluxe edition

The special deluxe edition was limited to 3000 copies as a double CD plus a DVD-A, and another 1000 copies in 10-inch (250 mm) vinyl (100 grams), both with a 120-page-hardback book, sold only via Headphone Dust mail order from a microsite in October 2008. All sold out within two weeks. Though this edition was released in 2008, the album is considered a 2009 release.

The CD/DVD-A edition includes the album itself, with a second CD consisting of songs recorded during the same sessions but excluded from the final track list. The DVD-A contains a 5.1 Surround Sound mix of the album, 24-bit stereo resolution, a trailer for the album that had been posted online, and an 18-minute clip from the Lasse Hoile film Insurgentes. The vinyl edition contains all songs from the CD/DVD-A version.

Wilson briefly considered re-pressing the special edition due to the high demand and ultimately decided not to, but later released all the extra tracks of the Special Edition bonus disc through his SoundCloud.com account as full-resolution WAVs.

Professional ratings
Review scores
Source	Rating
Allmusic	4/5 stars
All About Jazz	4.5/5 stars
Classic Rock	8/10
Kerrang!	3/5 stars
musicOMH	4/5 stars
Record Collector	4/5 stars
Rolling Stone	(positive)
Sound and Vision	4.5/5 stars
The Mercury	3.5/5 stars
Times Herald-Record	(B+)

Retail edition

The album has been available as a digital download since 16 February 2009. Those purchasers ordering the album from the Burning Shed online store received a link within a confirmation email to download the entire album in 256 kbit/s MP3 format to listen while waiting for the physical copy to arrive.

The Kscope retail edition of the album was physically released on 24 February 2009 in the US, 7 March in Australia and 9 March in the UK. It contains the original CD and DVD-A packaged in a hardback book. They also released an edition in a Super Jewel Box instead of digipak. In the US, a shortly-lived version with an autographed booklet was distributed by Newbury Comics starting from 24 February. This offer was packaged in jewelcase instead of the hardback digipak, and the DVD only had the 5.1 album mix with neither the trailers nor the 18-minute film excerpt.

Japanese edition

The album saw a Japanese release on 4 February 2009, containing both CDs from the special edition and a 40-page booklet in a hard cardboard case, with no DVD.

Limited vinyl edition

Kscope issued a double LP vinyl edition, shipped on 30 March 2009, which contains the regular album plus all bonus tracks of the deluxe edition on Side D, with the exception of "The 78". It was limited to 2000 copies and only available from the Burning Shed online store.

=== Singles ===
A single for the song "Harmony Korine" was released on 23 February, in a choice of black, white, or blood red coloured 7-inch vinyl, each limited to 1000 copies. The A-Side is a remixed edit of album track "Harmony Korine", and the B-side is a track called "The 78", only available previously as an untitled hidden track on the bonus disc of the deluxe edition. A promotional video of the single was uploaded to the mini-site and by Lasse Hoile to his YouTube channel. Shortly after the clip appeared in the website of Blender magazine. The song was NPR's "Song of the day" on 4 March 2009.

== Remix competition and NSRGNTS RMXS ==
From 31 January 2009, a renewed Insurgentes microsite created by Kscope replaced the old one, thought to offer information about the retail edition of the album, featuring more digital and interactive content than the previous site, including a competition to remix the track "Abandoner". Two remixes appeared as examples in the site, one by British dream pop band Engineers and other by King Crimson drummer Pat Mastelotto. Initially, the deadline for the competition was Friday 27 February, but by demand of those involved ones, it was extended one month until 27 March.

As of 15 May 2009, an EP titled NSRGNTS RMXS was available to order worldwide in both CD and Vinyl formats, the last one limited to 1000 copies. It comprises songs from the album mixed by David A. Sitek of New York City indie rock band TV on the Radio, Pat Mastelotto, Engineers, Hip Hop duo Dälek, and ambient artist Fear Falls Burning. The track list varies between both release formats.

Wilson chose eight of all the resulting mixes of "Abandoner", then people could vote through the Insurgentes website among those versions, and the resulting winner track by Łukasz Langa was included in the digital download and CD versions of the EP. The voting ended on 29 May.

== Track listing ==
=== Regular album ===
All tracks are written by Steven Wilson.

No.	Title	Length
1.	"Harmony Korine"	5:08
2.	"Abandoner"	4:48
3.	"Salvaging"	8:17
4.	"Veneno para las hadas"	5:57
5.	"No Twilight Within the Courts of the Sun"	8:37
6.	"Significant Other"	4:31
7.	"Only Child"	4:24
8.	"Twilight Coda" (instrumental)	3:25
9.	"Get All You Deserve"	6:17
10.	"Insurgentes"	3:55
Total length:		55:19

=== Bonus disc ===
The limited deluxe edition and the Japanese edition of the album include a bonus disc. All tracks, except the hidden "The 78", are also included on Side D of the Kscope limited vinyl edition. All of these tracks are available on SW's SoundCloud.com.

No.	Title	Length
1.	"Port Rubicon"	4:24
2.	"Puncture Wound"	4:18
3.	"Collecting Space"	5:10
4.	"Insurgentes (Mexico)"	5:45
5.	"The 78" (hidden track with 50 second pregap of silence. Its name has been unveiled after becoming the B-side for the Harmony Korine 7-inch single)	4:47

=== Vinyl edition ===
The Kscope vinyl edition of 2000 copies has the same track listing as the regular album (tracks 1–3 on Side A, 4–6 on Side B and 7–10 on Side C), plus all songs of the limited deluxe edition bonus disc on Side D, with the exception of "The 78".

== Personnel ==
- Steven Wilson – vocals, acoustic & electric guitars, acoustic & electric pianos, keyboards, synthesizers, harmonium, mellotron, bass guitar, percussion, drum & keyboard programming, ambient noise, loops

Guest musicians

- Gavin Harrison – drums (tracks 1, 2, 3, 5, 6, 7, 9, 1^{[*]}, 2^{[*]} and 3^{[*]}), cymbals (4)
- Tony Levin – bass (5, 6 and 3^{[*]})
- Mike Outram – electric guitar (5 and 8)
- Dirk Serries – guitar drones (3 and 9)
- Jordan Rudess – piano (4, 5 and 8)
- Clodagh Simonds – vocals (6)
- Sand Snowman – acoustic and processed acoustic guitars (2 and 8), recorders (4)
- Theo Travis – wah-flute (2), clarinet (4 and 1^{[*]}), saxophone (1^{[*]})
- Michiyo Yagi – 17-string bass koto (10), 21-string koto (3^{[*]})

[*] Bonus disc tracks

Technical personnel

- Produced & Mixed By Steven Wilson
- Engineers: Steve Price, Maki Sasaki
- Guitars Engineered By Mark Prator & John Wesley
- Piano Engineered By Bert Baldwin
- Mastering: Andy VanDette (stereo mix); Steven Wilson (5.1 mix)
- Cover and photography by Lasse Hoile

== Chart performance ==
Country	Peak Position
Top Heatseekers	15
Top Independent Albums	45
Poland	22
Netherlands	78
France	114
Germany	81

== Insurgentes road movie ==
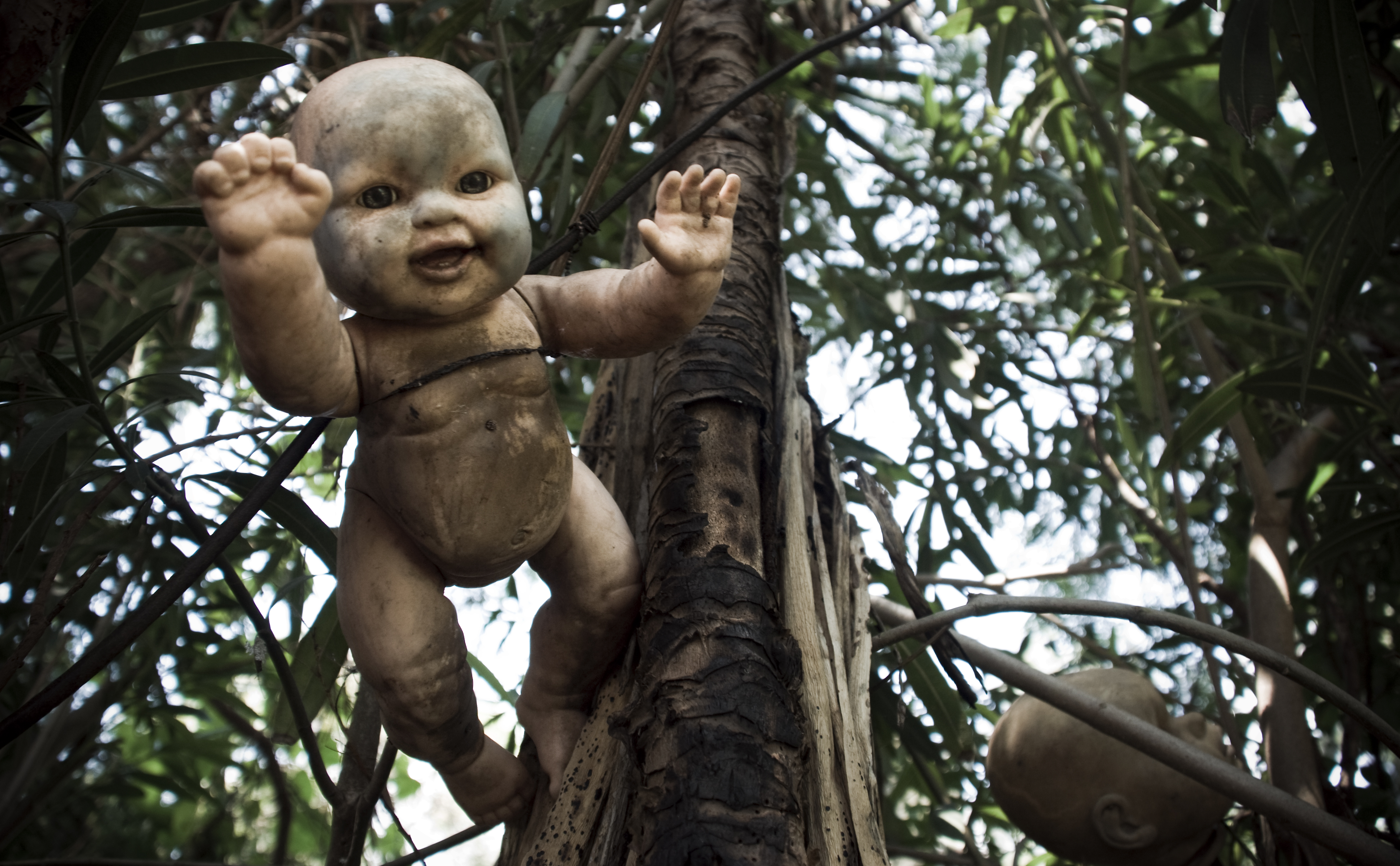
"Isla de las Muñecas" (in English: Dolls' Island), a chinampa nearby one of the Xochimilco canals. Part of the footage for the Insurgentes film took place there.

Insurgentes is a documentary, filmed and directed by Lasse Hoile, based on the curiosity of an artist to travel around the world and find inspiration to create music.

An 18-minute extract from the film is included on the DVD packaged with the deluxe edition of the album Insurgentes. The locations for the film include the Mexican Xochimilco canals and ex-Templo de Santa Teresa La Antigua (a church where piano and voices for the song "Insurgentes" were recorded). Other places where the filming took place were Sweden, England, Finland, Holland, USA and Denmark.

The film is now being screened all over the world through many independent film festivals, with a world premiere in the Danish CPH:DOX International Film Festival. Other screenings include Swedish "Sensurround Music Film Festival", the "Unerhoert Music Film Festival" in Hamburg, Germany, Mexican "Ambulante" and Argentine "Cinema at the Museum", of Mendoza.

The DVD was released on 27 September 2010. The first pre-orders will receive an additional bonus CD containing a 9 minutes song titled "Vapour Trail Lullaby" which was demoed during the In Absentia era and at the time only released in a very modified version as simply "Lullaby" in the Blackfield debut album. The DVD film contains a 31-minute film of Bass Communion and Pig live in Mexico City, the "Harmony Korine" video, trailers, an alternate ending, footage of a Q+A session with Steven Wilson and Lasse Hoile from the international premiere at the Copenhagen film festival, 6 audio out-takes from the album recording sessions, and is mixed in stereo and 5.1 surround sound with Spanish, French, German, and English subtitles.

=== iPod destruction ===
For the Insurgentes film, Wilson tested various ways to destroy iPods, as a protest against how the MP3 format reduces the experience of the listener. "I really wonder if people realise what shit they are listening to when they listen to an MP3", worries Steven Wilson, who compares the final result of such audio compression with someone who is staring at a photocopy of a painting in an Art Gallery. The methods of destruction move within a range of at least 10 different elements, including a sledgehammer, a blowtorch, a shotgun and a wood chipper among others.

=== Insurgentes bonus DVD track listing ===
1. Harmony Korine (Music Video)
2. Insurgentes Film Trailer #1
3. Insurgentes Film Trailer #2
4. Bass Communion / Pig Live In Mexico City
5. Alternate Ending Scene
6. CPH:DOX International Premiere - Footage From Post-Screening Q+A Session With Steven Wilson And Lasse Hoile
7. "Desperation" (unreleased track, audio only)
8. "Veneno Para Las Hadas" (demo, audio only)
9. "A Western Home" (unreleased track, audio only)
10. "Collecting Space" (demo, audio only)
11. "Deadwing Theme" (previously released only on MySpace, audio only)
12. "Insurgentes" (Sweet Billy Pilgrim remix, audio only)
