= Harmony Korine (song) =

Single by Steven Wilson

from the album Insurgentes
- B-side: "The 78"
- Released: 23 February 2009
- Recorded: December 2007 – August 2008
- Genre: Progressive rock
- Length: 9:02
- Label: Kscope
- Songwriter: Steven Wilson
- Producer: Steven Wilson

Steven Wilson singles chronology
"Harmony Korine" (2009)	"Postcard" (2011)

"Harmony Korine" is the debut single by English musician, songwriter and music producer Steven Wilson. The song is the first track and the only single to be released from Insurgentes, Wilson's first full-length solo studio album. The single is named after the American filmmaker of the same name.

The song was NPR's "Song of the day" on 4 March 2009. A single of the same name was released by Kscope record label on black, white and red 7-inch vinyl format, limited to 1,000 copies each one. Its B-Side, a song titled "The 78", was previously available as a hidden track in the second disc of the deluxe edition of Insurgentes.

== Single ==
The "Harmony Korine" single was available as a limited edition of 1,000 copies in black, white, and blood red vinyl which could be ordered through the Burning Shed online store, starting from 23 February 2009. It was preceded by the digital launching of a promotional video created and directed by Danish photographer and filmmaker Lasse Hoile featured in the website of Blender magazine.

== Music video ==
Scene from the official music video. Similar to the final shot of Un chien andalou

Before the release of the retail version of Insurgentes, the official video for "Harmony Korine" was uploaded on YouTube by director Lasse Hoile but was later removed as a violation by main label Snapper Music. It was then later uploaded again onto YouTube.

The video utilizes surrealism techniques influenced by many classic film pieces including Luis Buñuel short subject film Un chien andalou, The Mirror by Andrei Tarkovsky, Judex by Georges Franju among others.

== Track listing ==
7"; digital download
No.	Title	Length
1.	"Harmony Korine" (Edit)	4:12
2.	"The 78"	4:47

UK promotional CD
No.	Title	Length
1.	"Harmony Korine" (Edit)	4:12
2.	"Harmony Korine" (Album Version)	5:08

== Personnel ==
- Steven Wilson – vocals, electric guitars, bass, keyboards
- Gavin Harrison – drums
