= Nicolas Chapel =

French musician and producer

Nicolas Chapel (born 1979) is a French musician and producer who writes, performs and records his own music and works with various artists.

Brought up in Northeastern France, he started playing the guitar when he was eight. He is now known for singing, playing the piano, drums, bass, cello and other stringed instruments, as well as exotic instruments like the dilruba, sarangi or kalimba. Self-taught in every instrument and his production techniques, his music always focuses on the songwriting rather than musicianship.

His most well-known project is named Demians, mixing a wall of sound with more delicate performances, with influences ranging from experimental and ambient music to alternative rock.

He is also respected as a producer and arranger, and works for and with various artists, his latest collaboration being the soundtrack of the animated movie "L'Apprenti Père Noël" with famous French artist Arthur H.

== Discography ==
=== Studio albums ===
with Demians

- Building An Empire (2008)
- Mute (2010)
- Mercury (2014)
- Battles (2016)

=== Movie soundtracks ===
- L'Apprenti Père Noël (2010), with Arthur H
