= Alex Hutchings (guitarist) =

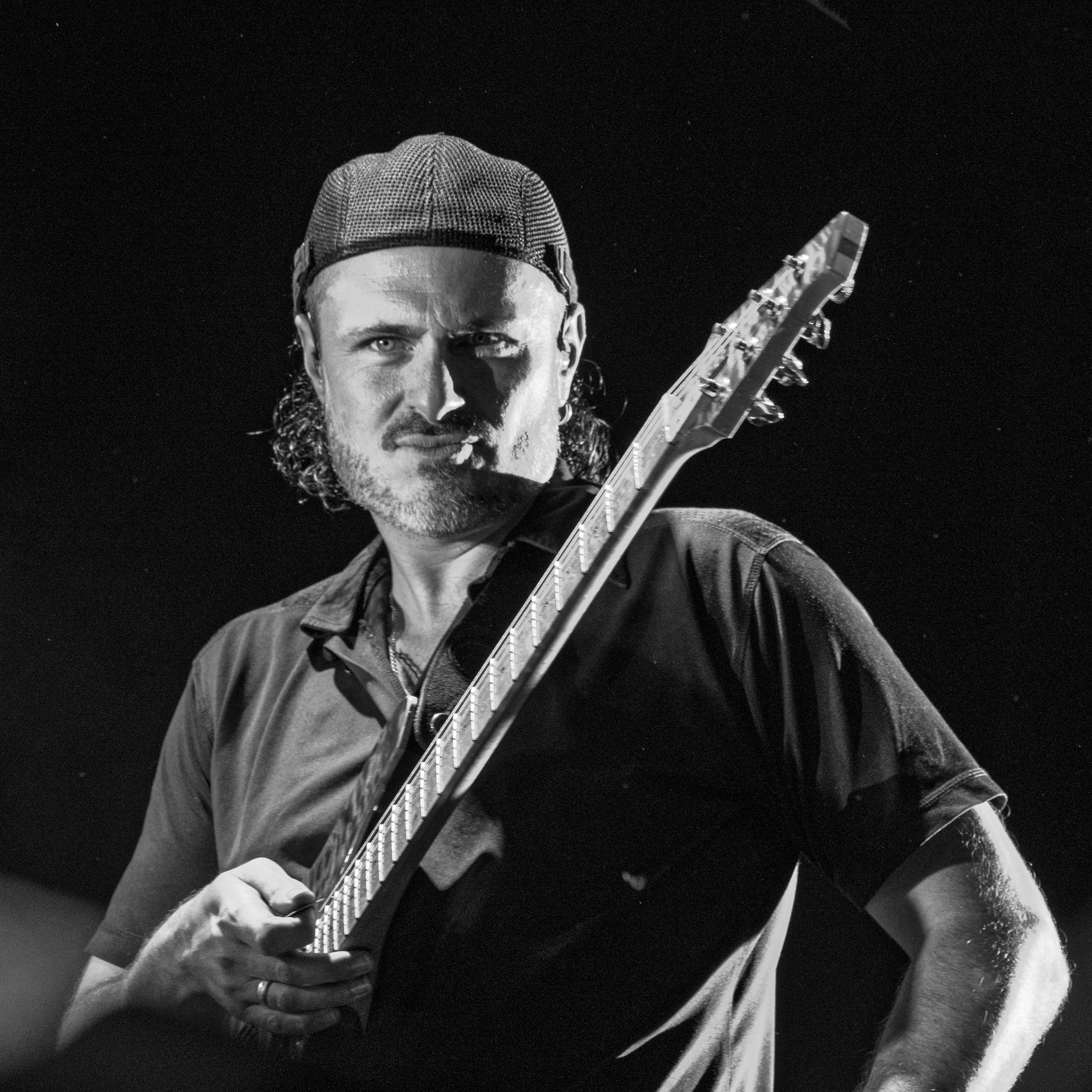
- Alex Hutchings in concert with Steven Wilson, 2018.

Background information
- Origin: Bristol, England
- Genres: Jazz fusion; rock; blues rock
- Instrument: Guitar
- Website: https://www.alexhutchingsonline.com/

Alex Hutchings is a guitarist based in Bristol, England. He especially plays and teaches jazz fusion, rock and blues rock.

Since 2002, he has toured for a variety of different musical ensembles and brands.

== Career ==
Hutchings has the main guitar role on the Thriller – Live concert. He also composes music for BBC TV and radio and ITV.

In late 2017 he joined the Steven Wilson live band, touring with them in support of Wilson's To the Bone album.

In late 2019, Alex released his first online guitar masterclass with JTC Guitar named "Approach to Improvising Masterclass: Vol 1"

== Equipment ==
Hutchings has collaborated with Waghorn and Mayones guitars, Rotosound strings, Laney Amplification and Roland Corporation.
